= 2021–22 Northern Kentucky Norse men's basketball team =

American college basketball season

2021–22 Northern Kentucky Norse men's basketball
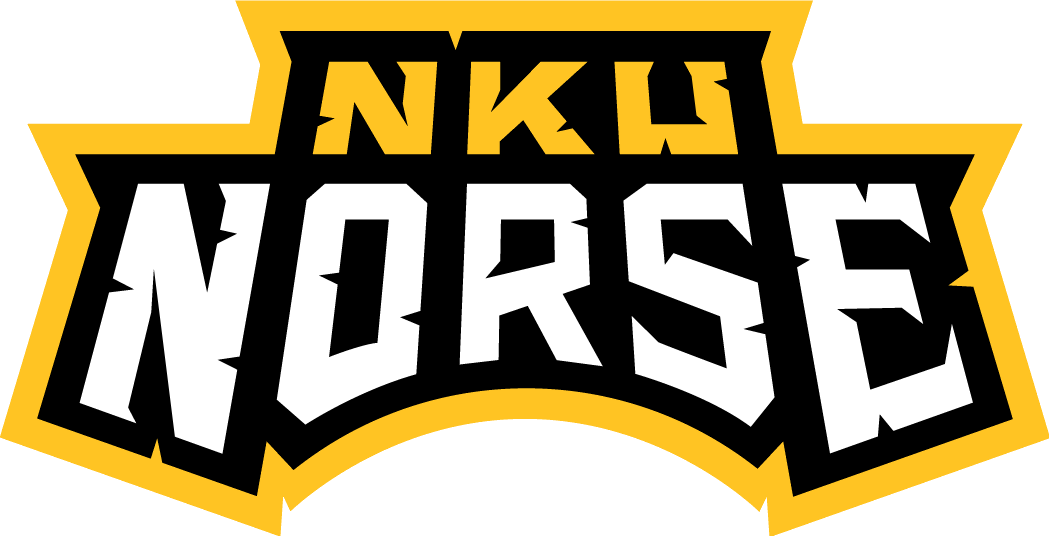
- Conference: Horizon League
- Record: 20–12 (14–6 Horizon)
- Head coach: Darrin Horn (3rd season)
- Assistant coaches: David Harris; Eric Haut; Simon McCormack
- Home arena: BB&T Arena

2021–22 Horizon League men's basketball standings
	Conf.				Overall
Team	W		L	PCT	W		L	PCT
Cleveland State	15	–	6	.714	20	–	11	.645
Purdue Fort Wayne	15	–	6	.714	21	–	12	.636
Northern Kentucky	14	–	6	.700	20	–	12	.625
Wright State †	15	–	7	.682	22	–	14	.611
Oakland	12	–	7	.632	20	–	12	.625
Detroit Mercy	10	–	7	.588	14	–	15	.483
Youngstown State	12	–	9	.571	19	–	15	.559
UIC	9	–	10	.474	14	–	16	.467
Milwaukee	8	–	14	.364	10	–	22	.313
Robert Morris	5	–	16	.238	8	–	23	.258
Green Bay	4	–	16	.200	5	–	25	.167
IUPUI	1	–	16	.059	3	–	26	.103
† 2022 Horizon League tournament winner

The 2021–22 Northern Kentucky Norse men's basketball team represented Northern Kentucky University in the 2021–22 NCAA Division I men's basketball season. The Norse, led by third-year head coach Darrin Horn, played their home games at BB&T Arena in Highland Heights, Kentucky as members of the Horizon League.

This was the final season in which the Norse's home was known as BB&T Arena. In 2020, the arena's sponsor BB&T merged with SunTrust to create Truist Financial. However, the merged company did not start branding its Kentucky locations with the new corporate name until late 2021. On April 5, 2022, the venue was officially renamed Truist Arena.

== Previous season ==
The Norse finished the 2020–21 season 14–11, 11–7 in Horizon League play to finish in fourth place. In the Horizon League tournament, they defeated Detroit Mercy in quarterfinals, before losing to Oakland in the semifinals.

== Roster ==
2021–22 Northern Kentucky Norse men's basketball team
Players
Coaches

Pos.	#	Name	Height	Weight	Year	Previous school	Hometown
G	0	Isaiah Mason	6 ft 4 in (1.93 m)	175 lb (79 kg)	Fr	Bowling Green HS	Bowling Green, KY
G	1	Trey Robinson	6 ft 6 in (1.98 m)	210 lb (95 kg)	So	Hamilton HS	Hamilton, OH
G	2	Sam Vinson	6 ft 5 in (1.96 m)	195 lb (88 kg)	Fr	Highlands HS	Fort Thomas, KY
G	3	Marques Warrick	6 ft 2 in (1.88 m)	175 lb (79 kg)	So	Henry Clay HS	Lexington, KY
F	4	Adrian Nelson	6 ft 8 in (2.03 m)	225 lb (102 kg)	Sr	Pickerington Central HS	Pickerington, OH
C	10	Imanuel Zorgvol	7 ft 0 in (2.13 m)	210 lb (95 kg)	Fr	Central Florida Christian Academy	Paramaribo, Suriname
G	11	Bryson Langdon	5 ft 9 in (1.75 m)	170 lb (77 kg)	Sr	Arizona Western	Chicago, IL
F	13	David Böhm	6 ft 9 in (2.06 m)	220 lb (100 kg)	So	Montverde Academy	Prague, Czech Republic
F	14	Seybian Sims	6 ft 7 in (2.01 m)	205 lb (93 kg)	Jr	North Dakota	Iowa City, IA
F	21	Chris Brandon	6 ft 8 in (2.03 m)	220 lb (100 kg)	Jr	Detroit Mercy	Houston, TX
G	22	Trevon Faulkner	6 ft 4 in (1.93 m)	200 lb (91 kg)	Sr	Mercer County HS	Harrodsburg, KY
G	24	Jake Evans	6 ft 1 in (1.85 m)	180 lb (82 kg)	So	Male HS	Louisville, KY
G	34	Hubertas Pivorius	6 ft 2 in (1.88 m)	170 lb (77 kg)	Fr	Christopher Columbus HS	Vilnius, Lithuania
C	42	Noah Hupmann	7 ft 1 in (2.16 m)	215 lb (98 kg)	So	Covington Catholic HS	Union, KY
F/C	44	David Wassler	6 ft 10 in (2.08 m)	230 lb (104 kg)	Sr	St. Xavier HS	Cincinnati, OH

Head coach

- Darrin Horn (Western Kentucky)

Assistant coach(es)

- David Harris (Ashland)
- Eric Haut (Kent State)
- Simon McCormack (American)

Legend

- (C) Team captain
- (S) Suspended
- (I) Ineligible
- (W) Walk-on
- Injured
- Current redshirt

Roster
Last update: December 27, 2021

== Schedule and results ==
Date time, TV	Rank^{#}	Opponent^{#}	Result	Record	Site (attendance) city, state
Exhibition
November 4, 2021*; 7:00 pm		Lake Erie	W 75–64	–	BB&T Arena; Highland Heights, KY
Regular season
November 9, 2021*; 7:00 pm, ESPN+		Wheeling	W 82–54	1–0	Truist Arena (2,146); Highland Heights, KY
November 12, 2021*; 7:00 pm, ESPN+		UNC Greensboro	L 69–70 ^{OT}	1–1	Truist Arena (2,489); Highland Heights, KY
November 18, 2021*; 7:00 pm, ESPN+		Eastern Michigan; Blue Demon Classic	W 74–73	2–1	BB&T Arena (2,220); Highland Heights, KY
November 22, 2021*; 7:00 pm, ESPN+		Western Illinois; Blue Demon Classic	L 67–69	2–2	BB&T Arena (2,065); Highland Heights, KY
November 26, 2021*; 5:00 pm, FS2		at DePaul; Blue Demon Classic	L 68–77	2–3	Wintrust Arena (2,465); Chicago, IL
December 2, 2021; 7:00 pm, ESPN+		at Cleveland State	L 58–72	2–4 (0–1)	Wolstein Center (1,729); Cleveland, OH
December 4, 2021; 1:00 pm, ESPN+		at Purdue Fort Wayne	L 57–71	2–5 (0–2)	Allen County War Memorial Coliseum (1,143); Fort Wayne, IN
December 8, 2021*; 7:00 pm, ESPN+		Canisius	W 75–62	3–5	BB&T Arena (2,235); Highland Heights, KY
December 12, 2021*; 2:00 pm, ESPN+		Alice Lloyd	W 91–55	4–5	BB&T Arena (1,897); Highland Heights, KY
December 18, 2021*; 7:00 pm, ESPN+		at Eastern Kentucky	L 68–81 ^{OT}	4–6	McBrayer Arena (3,057); Richmond, KY
December 22, 2021*; 7:00 pm, BTN		at Indiana	L 61–79	4–7	Simon Skjodt Assembly Hall (12,497); Bloomington, IN
December 30, 2021; 7:00 pm, ESPN+		Green Bay	W 79-74	5–7 (1–2)	BB&T Arena (2,384); Highland Heights, KY
January 1, 2022; 2:00 pm, ESPN+		Milwaukee	L 55–61	5–8 (1–3)	BB&T Arena (2,365); Highland Heights, KY
January 6, 2022; 7:00 pm, ESPN+		IUPUI	Canceled due to COVID-19 protocols		BB&T Arena; Highland Heights, KY
January 8, 2022; 2:00 pm, BSOH		UIC	Canceled due to COVID-19 protocols		BB&T Arena; Highland Heights, KY
January 10, 2022; 6:00 pm, ESPN+		Wright State	Postponed to Jan. 25 due to COVID-19 protocols		BB&T Arena; Highland Heights, KY
January 13, 2022; 7:00 pm, ESPN+		at Youngstown State	W 68–67	6–8 (2–3)	Beeghly Center (1634); Youngstown, OH
January 15, 2022; 7:00 pm, ESPN+		at Robert Morris	L 64–74	6–9 (2–4)	UPMC Events Center (703); Moon Township, PA
January 20, 2022; 8:00 pm, ESPN+		at UIC	W 74–70 ^{OT}	7–9 (3–4)	Credit Union 1 Arena (2,024); Chicago, IL
January 22, 2022; 12:00 pm, ESPN+		at IUPUI	W 60–41	8–9 (4–4)	Indiana Farmers Coliseum (795); Indianapolis, IN
January 25, 2022; 7:00 pm, ESPN+		Wright State; Rescheduled from January 10	W 73–63	9–9 (5–4)	BB&T Arena (2421); Highland Heights, KY
January 28, 2022; 7:00 pm, BSOH		Purdue Fort Wayne	W 59–49	10–9 (6–4)	BB&T Arena (2,563); Highland Heights, KY
January 30, 2022; 12:00 pm, BSOH		Cleveland State	W 78–72	11–9 (7–4)	BB&T Arena (1993); Highland Heights, KY
February 4, 2022; 7:00 pm, BSOH		Oakland	W 87–78 ^{OT}	12–9 (8–4)	BB&T Arena (2,073); Highland Heights, KY
February 5, 2022; 7:00 pm, ESPN+		Detroit Mercy	L 68–74	12–10 (8–5)	BB&T Arena (3,100); Highland Heights, KY
February 9, 2022; 7:00 pm, ESPN+		at Milwaukee	W 75–39	13–10 (9–5)	UW–Milwaukee Panther Arena (1,931); Milwaukee, WI
February 11, 2022; 8:00 pm, ESPN+		at Green Bay	W 71–62	14–10 (10–5)	Kress Events Center (1,735); Green Bay, WI
February 13, 2022; 2:00 pm, ESPN+		at Wright State	W 75–71	15–10 (11–5)	Nutter Center (3,232); Dayton, OH
February 18, 2022; 7:00 pm, ESPN+		at Detroit Mercy	L 52–60	15–11 (11–6)	Calihan Hall (1,441); Detroit, MI
February 20, 2022; 3:00 pm, ESPN+		at Oakland	W 71–66	16–11 (12–6)	Athletics Center O'rena (3,505); Auburn Hills, MI
February 24, 2022; 7:00 pm, ESPN+		Robert Morris	W 78–64	17–11 (13–6)	BB&T Arena (3,300); Highland Heights, KY
February 26, 2022; 7:00 pm, ESPN+		Youngstown State	W 75–61	18–11 (14–6)	BB&T Arena (2,747); Highland Heights, KY
Horizon League tournament
March 3, 2022; 7:00 pm, ESPN+	(3)	(6) Detroit Mercy; Quarterfinals	W 77–59	19–11	BB&T Arena (2,177); Highland Heights, KY
March 7, 2022; 9:30 pm, ESPN2	(3)	vs. (2) Purdue Fort Wayne; Semifinals	W 57–43	20–11	Indiana Farmers Coliseum; Indianapolis, IN
March 8, 2022; 7:00 pm, ESPN	(3)	vs. (4) Wright State; Championship	L 71–72	20–12	Indiana Farmers Coliseum; Indianapolis, IN
*Non-conference game. ^{#}Rankings from AP Poll. (#) Tournament seedings in parentheses. All times are in Eastern.
