= Dennis Gates =

American basketball coach (born 1980)

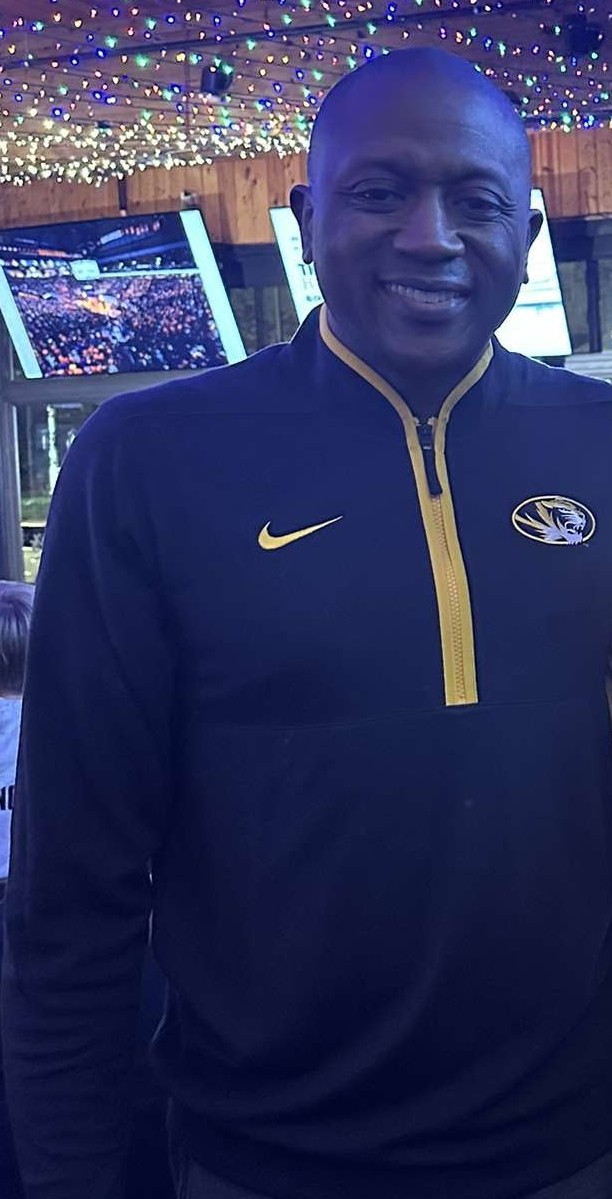
- Gates at Harpo's Bar & Grill in 2024

Current position
- Title: Head coach
- Team: Missouri
- Conference: SEC
- Record: 80–60 (.571)
- Annual salary: $4.2 million (2025–26)

Biographical details
- Born: January 14, 1980 (age 46); Chicago, Illinois, U.S.

Playing career
- 1998–2002: California

Coaching career (HC unless noted)
- 2003–2004: Marquette (GA)
- 2004–2005: Florida State (GA)
- 2005–2007: California (assistant)
- 2007–2009: Northern Illinois (assistant)
- 2009–2011: Nevada (assistant)
- 2011–2019: Florida State (assistant)
- 2019–2022: Cleveland State
- 2022–present: Missouri

Head coaching record
- Overall: 130–100 (.565)
- Tournaments: 1–4 (.200) (NCAA Division I); 0–1 (.000) (NIT)

Accomplishments and honors

Championships
- Horizon League tournament (2021); 2 Horizon League regular season (2021, 2022)

Awards
- 2× Horizon League Coach of the Year (2020, 2021)

Dennis Gates (born January 14, 1980) is an American college basketball coach and former player who is the head coach of the Missouri Tigers men's basketball team.

== Playing career ==
Gates played guard at Whitney Young Magnet High School in Chicago, Illinois. As a senior, he captained the Dolphins to an Illinois High School Association Class AA title alongside friend and future NBA player Quentin Richardson. In the state final against Galesburg High School, Gates led all Dolphins scorers with 20 points.

Gates played college basketball at California, where he was a two-time first-team All-Academic selection in the Pac-10, having graduated in three years, playing his senior season as a master's degree candidate. Gates was also a member of Cal's 2002 NCAA tournament team.

== Coaching career ==
After graduation, Gates served as a coaching intern for the Los Angeles Clippers before heading to the college ranks for two graduate assistant coaching positions at Marquette and Florida State for a season each. He would return to his alma mater as a full assistant coach in 2005 under Ben Braun. From 2007 to 2009, Gates served as an assistant coach at Northern Illinois before another two-year stint as an assistant coach at Nevada. In 2011, he rejoined the Florida State staff as an assistant coach under Leonard Hamilton and was part of the Seminoles' 2011–12 ACC Tournament championship squad. He was a part of seven Seminole NCAA Tournament teams, including two Sweet 16 and one Elite Eight runs. During a January 10, 2017, contest between Florida State and Duke, Gates was shoved by Blue Devils guard Grayson Allen as the guard went for a loose ball near the Florida State bench. The clip garnered national attention, but Gates defended Allen in the aftermath stating he was not the victim of a dirty play.

=== Cleveland State ===
==== 2019–20 ====
On July 26, 2019, Gates was named 17th head coach in Cleveland State basketball history, replacing Dennis Felton. Gates won his first game as a college head coach on November 9, 2019, against the Division II Edinboro Fighting Scots, a 79–54 victory for the Vikings. Following his efforts in his first season, Gates was rewarded a share of the Horizon League Coach of the Year after Cleveland State won seven games in Horizon League play, the most for the school in five years. Gates is only the second head coach in Cleveland State history to be named Horizon League Coach of the Year, joining Gary Waters (2007–08). He was also the first head coach with an 11-win season to be named Horizon League Coach of the Year and only the second coach in league history to be awarded the honor with a sub-.500 record, joining 1980–81 Horizon League Coach of the Year Bob Staak (12–16, Xavier). Gates also coached junior forward Algevon Eichelberger to a Horizon League All-Third Team selection, as well as Torrey Patton to Player of the Week (Jan. 6) and Hugo Ferreira to Freshman of the Week (Feb. 25). Cleveland State saw significant improvements in his first season at the helm, winning three straight league games for the first time since the 2014–15 season and winning three straight non-conference games for the first time since the 2011–12 season.

==== 2020–21 ====
Gates began his second season as the Cleveland State head coach with an 0–3 record in non-conference play, with losses to Toledo, Ohio and Ohio State. They began their conference schedule by defeating Purdue Fort Wayne twice; the second game featured junior guard D’Moi Hodge breaking a school record 10 3-pointers and scoring 46 points, the 2nd most in a game in school history behind Franklin Edwards, who had 49 against Xavier. It was also the first time Cleveland State started 2–0 in Horizon League play since the 2014–15 season. Furthermore, after a January 15 road win at Wright State, Cleveland State started 9–0 in the Horizon League for the first time in program history. Gates also obtained the same number of wins as his predecessor, Dennis Felton, did at Cleveland State in 18 fewer games.

==== 2021–22 ====
On May 20, 2021, Gates signed a new six-year deal with Cleveland State. The new revised deal replaced the original five-year deal Gates signed in July 2019. The new deal was worth an estimated $3.2 million, or $550,000 a year, which made Gates the highest-paid coach in the Horizon League.

=== Missouri ===
==== 2022–23 ====
On March 22, 2022, the University of Missouri announced Gates would be the men's basketball coach and was introduced in a press conference shortly after the announcement. Gates is the program's 20th head coach. Despite his team only having two returning players from the 2021-22 Tigers, Gates orchestrated one of the biggest turnarounds in NCAA men's basketball, going 23–8 in regular season play with ranked wins against Illinois, Kentucky, Iowa State and Tennessee. Following an SEC Tournament win over Tennessee on Friday, March 10, 2023, the University of Missouri extended Gates’ contract through the 2028–2029 season, increasing his pay to $4 million per year, with $100,000 annual increases. The Tigers earned a 7 seed in the 2023 NCAA Division I men's basketball tournament, beating Utah State for the program's first NCAA Tournament win since 2010 before being upset by 15-seed Princeton.

==== 2023–24 ====
The Tigers finished the season with an overall record of 8–24 and without a win (0–18) in SEC play, the first time the team had not won a conference game since their 1907–08 season.

==== 2024-25 ====
For the 2024–25 season, Missouri compiled a 22–11 record, going 10–8 in the SEC. Led by Gates, Missouri had signature wins against #1 Kansas, #5 Florida, and #4 Alabama. The Tigers earned a #6 seed in the 2025 NCAA Division I men's basketball tournament, losing in the First Round to #11 seed Drake.

==== 2025-26 ====
The 2025-26 season saw the Tigers post a 20-13 record, again going 10-8 in the SEC. Ranked wins came over Florida, Vanderbilt, and Tennessee, plus the program won its first game ever at Rupp Arena when they defeated Kentucky. The Tigers earned a #10 seed in the West Region for the 2026 NCAA Division I men's basketball tournament, and despite a favorable draw at Enterprise Center in St. Louis (roughly 90 minutes from the Mizzou campus) they fell 80-66 to Miami (FL). On the recruiting trail, Mizzou posted its best class in school history headlined by five-star prospect Jason Crowe Jr., California high school basketball's all-time leading scorer, plus fellow McDonald's All-American Game participant Toni Bryant.

== Personal life ==
Gates has been married since 2017 to Jocelyn Gates. Jocelyn has a Doctor of Education and was previously the Senior Associate Director of Athletics at Ohio State and now works at the search and consulting firm TurnkeyZRG. They have three children. His younger brother Armon played basketball collegiately at Kent State and also went into coaching; he is currently an assistant at Minnesota.

== Head coaching record ==
Record table
| Season | Team | Overall | Conference | Standing | Postseason |
|---|---|---|---|---|---|
Cleveland State Vikings (Horizon League) (2019–2022)
| 2019–20 | Cleveland State | 11–21 | 7–11 | T–7th | |
| 2020–21 | Cleveland State | 19–8 | 16–4 | T–1st | NCAA Division I Round of 64 |
| 2021–22 | Cleveland State | 20–11 | 15–6 | T–1st | NIT First Round |
| Cleveland State: | | 50–40 (.556) | 38–21 (.644) | | |
Missouri Tigers (Southeastern Conference) (2022–present)
| 2022–23 | Missouri | 25–10 | 11–7 | T–4th | NCAA Division I Round of 32 |
| 2023–24 | Missouri | 8–24 | 0–18 | 14th | |
| 2024–25 | Missouri | 22–12 | 10–8 | T–6th | NCAA Division I Round of 64 |
| 2025–26 | Missouri | 20–13 | 10–8 | T–7th | NCAA Division I Round of 64 |
| 2026–27 | Missouri | 5–1 | 0–0 | | |
| Missouri: | | 80–60 (.571) | 31–41 (.431) | | |
| Total: | | 130–100 (.565) | | | |
National champion Postseason invitational champion Conference regular season champion Conference regular season and conference tournament champion Division regular season champion Division regular season and conference tournament champion Conference tournament champion
