= 2020–21 Wright State Raiders men's basketball team =

American college basketball season

2020–21 Wright State Raiders men's basketball

Horizon League regular season co-champions
- Conference: Horizon League
- Record: 18–6 (16–4 Horizon)
- Head coach: Scott Nagy (5th season)
- Associate head coach: Brian Cooley
- Assistant coaches: Sharif Chambliss; Clint Sargent
- Home arena: Nutter Center

2020–21 Horizon League men's basketball standings
	Conf.				Overall
Team	W		L	PCT	W		L	PCT
Wright State	16	–	4	.800	18	–	6	.750
Cleveland State †	16	–	4	.800	19	–	8	.704
Detroit Mercy	10	–	6	.625	12	–	10	.545
Northern Kentucky	11	–	7	.611	14	–	11	.560
Oakland	10	–	10	.500	12	–	18	.400
Youngstown State	9	–	11	.450	15	–	12	.556
IUPUI	7	–	9	.438	8	–	10	.444
Milwaukee	7	–	10	.412	10	–	12	.455
Green Bay	8	–	12	.400	8	–	17	.320
UIC	6	–	10	.375	9	–	13	.409
Purdue Fort Wayne	6	–	14	.300	8	–	15	.348
Robert Morris	3	–	12	.200	4	–	15	.211
† 2021 Horizon League tournament winner

The 2020–21 Wright State Raiders men's basketball team represented Wright State University in the 2020–21 NCAA Division I men's basketball season. The Raiders, led by fifth-year head coach Scott Nagy, played their home games at the Nutter Center in Fairborn, Ohio as members of the Horizon League.

== Previous season ==
The Raiders finished the 2019–20 season 25–7, 15–3 in Horizon League play to be regular season Horizon League champions. They lost in the semifinals of the Horizon League tournament to UIC. As regular season league champions who failed to win their league tournament, they received an automatic bid to the National Invitation Tournament. However, the NIT, and all other postseason tournament, were cancelled amid the COVID-19 pandemic.

== Roster ==
2020–21 Wright State Raiders men's basketball team
Players
Coaches

Pos.	#	Name	Height	Weight	Year	Hometown
G	0	Jaylon Hall	6 ft 5 in (1.96 m)	190 lb (86 kg)	RS Jr	Houston, Texas
G	1	Trey Calvin	6 ft 0 in (1.83 m)	165 lb (75 kg)	So	Glendale Heights, Illinois
G	2	Tanner Holden	6 ft 6 in (1.98 m)	185 lb (84 kg)	So	Wheelersburg, Ohio
G	3	Alex Huibragtse	6 ft 3 in (1.91 m)	195 lb (88 kg)	Fr	Grafton, Wisconsin
G	5	Andre Harris	6 ft 3 in (1.91 m)	190 lb (86 kg)	RS Fr	Lyndhurst, Ohio
C	11	Loudon Love	6 ft 8 in (2.03 m)	260 lb (118 kg)	RS Sr	Geneva, Illinois
F	14	Brandon Noel	6 ft 8 in (2.03 m)	235 lb (107 kg)	RS Fr	Lucasville, Ohio
F	20	Andy Neff	6 ft 7 in (2.01 m)	215 lb (98 kg)	Jr	Oakwood, Ohio
F	21	Grant Basile	6 ft 9 in (2.06 m)	225 lb (102 kg)	RS So	Pewaukee, Wisconsin
G	22	Andrew Welage	6 ft 6 in (1.98 m)	180 lb (82 kg)	Fr	Greensburg, Indiana
F	23	James Manns	6 ft 7 in (2.01 m)	210 lb (95 kg)	RS Jr	Columbus, Ohio
G	24	Tim Finke	6 ft 6 in (1.98 m)	215 lb (98 kg)	RS So	Champaign, Illinois
G	31	Cole Gentry	5 ft 10 in (1.78 m)	180 lb (82 kg)	Sr	St. Charles, Illinois
G	32	TJ Nagy	6 ft 1 in (1.85 m)	175 lb (79 kg)	So	Bellbrook, Ohio

Head coach

- Scott Nagy (Delta State)

Assistant coach(es)

- Brian Cooley (Nebraska Wesleyan)
- Sharif Chambliss (Wisconsin)
- Clint Sargent (South Dakota State)

Legend

- (C) Team captain
- (S) Suspended
- (I) Ineligible
- (W) Walk-on
- Injured
- Current redshirt

Roster
Last update: December 21, 2020

== Schedule and results ==
Date time, TV	Rank^{#}	Opponent^{#}	Result	Record	Site (attendance) city, state
Non-conference regular season
December 3, 2020*; 7:00 pm, ESPN+		Marshall	L 64–80	0–1	Nutter Center (50); Fairborn, OH
December 5, 2020*; 4:00 pm, ESPN3		Miami (OH)	W 71–47	1–1	Nutter Center; Fairborn, OH
December 13, 2020*; 12:00 pm, ESPN+		at Bowling Green	W 85–67	2–1	Stroh Center (300); Bowling Green, OH
Horizon League regular season
December 19, 2020; 2:00 pm, ESPN3		at Detroit Mercy	W 93–70	3–1 (1–0)	Calihan Hall; Detroit, MI
December 20, 2020; 2:00 pm, ESPN3		at Detroit Mercy	W 85–72	4–1 (2–0)	Calihan Hall; Detroit, OH
December 26, 2020; 4:00 pm, ESPN3		Green Bay	W 67–53	5–1 (3–0)	Nutter Center; Fairborn, OH
December 27, 2020; 2:00 pm, ESPN3		Green Bay	W 90–77	6–1 (4–0)	Nutter Center; Fairborn, OH
January 1, 2021; 7:00 pm, ESPN3		at Oakland	W 90–51	7–1 (5–0)	Athletics Center O'rena; Auburn Hills, MI
January 2, 2021; 5:00 pm, ESPN+		at Oakland	L 71–81	7–2 (5–1)	Athletics Center O'rena; Auburn Hills, MI
January 8, 2021; 7:00 pm, ESPN2		Youngstown State	L 72–74	7–3 (5–2)	Nutter Center; Fairborn, OH
January 9, 2021; 3:00 pm, ESPN3		Youngstown State	W 93–55	8–3 (6–2)	Nutter Center; Fairborn, OH
January 15, 2021; 7:00 pm, ESPNU		Cleveland State	L 64–66	8–4 (6–3)	Nutter Center; Fairborn, OH
January 16, 2021; 7:00 pm, ESPN3		Cleveland State	W 85–49	9–4 (7–3)	Nutter Center; Fairborn, OH
January 22, 2021; 12:00 pm, ESPN3		at IUPUI	W 95–65	10–4 (8–3)	Indiana Farmers Coliseum; Indianapolis, IN
January 23, 2021; 12:00 pm, ESPN3		at IUPUI	W 100–72	11–4 (9–3)	Indiana Farmer Coliseum; Indianapolis, IN
January 29, 2021; 9:00 pm, ESPNU		Robert Morris	W 79–70	12–4 (10–3)	Nutter Center; Fairborn, OH
January 30, 2021; 7:00 pm, ESPN+		Robert Morris	W 86–56	13–4 (11–3)	Nutter Center; Fairborn, OH
February 5, 2021; 8:00 pm, ESPN+		at UIC	W 72–47	14–4 (12–3)	Credit Union 1 Arena; Chicago, IL
February 6, 2021; 8:00 pm, ESPN+		at UIC	W 77–57	15–4 (13–3)	Credit Union 1 Arena; Fairborn, OH
February 12, 2021; 7:00 pm, ESPN3		Milwaukee	W 92–81	16–4 (14–3)	Nutter Center; Fairborn, OH
February 13, 2021; 3:00 pm, ESPN3		Milwaukee	W 92–82	17–4 (15–3)	Nutter Center; Fairborn, OH
February 19, 2021; ESPN3		at Northern Kentucky	L 75–81	17–5 (15–4)	BB&T Arena; Highland Heights, KY
February 20, 2021; ESPN3		at Northern Kentucky	W 77–71	18–5 (16–4)	BB&T Arena; Highland Heights, KY
Horizon League tournament
March 2, 2021; 7:00 pm, ESPN+	(2)	(8) Milwaukee; Quarterfinals	L 92–94 ^{OT}	18–6	Nutter Center; Fairborn, OH
*Non-conference game. ^{#}Rankings from AP Poll. (#) Tournament seedings in parentheses. All times are in Eastern.

== Awards and honors ==
Loudon Love	Horizon League Player of the Year
Loudon Love	First Team All Horizon League
Tanner Holden	First Team All Horizon League
Grant Basile	Second Team All Horizon League
Loudon Love	Horizon League All Defensive Team
Tim Finke	Horizon League All Defensive Team

== Statistics ==
Number	Name	Games	Average	Points	Assists	Rebounds
11	Loudon Love	24	16.6	399	46	242
2	Tanner Holden	24	15.8	380	64	175
21	Grant Basile	24	15.0	361	41	169
24	Tim Finke	23	10.0	230	42	160
1	Trey Calvin	24	9.7	233	83	61
0	Jaylon Hall	22	9.4	207	52	55
23	James Manns	15	3.2	48	4	24
3	Alex Huibregtse	24	2.6	63	20	34
22	Andrew Welage	11	1.6	18	10	17
5	Andre Harris	11	1.2	13	7	13
20	Andy Neff	10	1.0	10	0	6
32	TJ Nagy	8	0.6	5	0	3
