= 2020–21 Northern Kentucky Norse men's basketball team =

American college basketball season

2020–21 Northern Kentucky Norse men's basketball
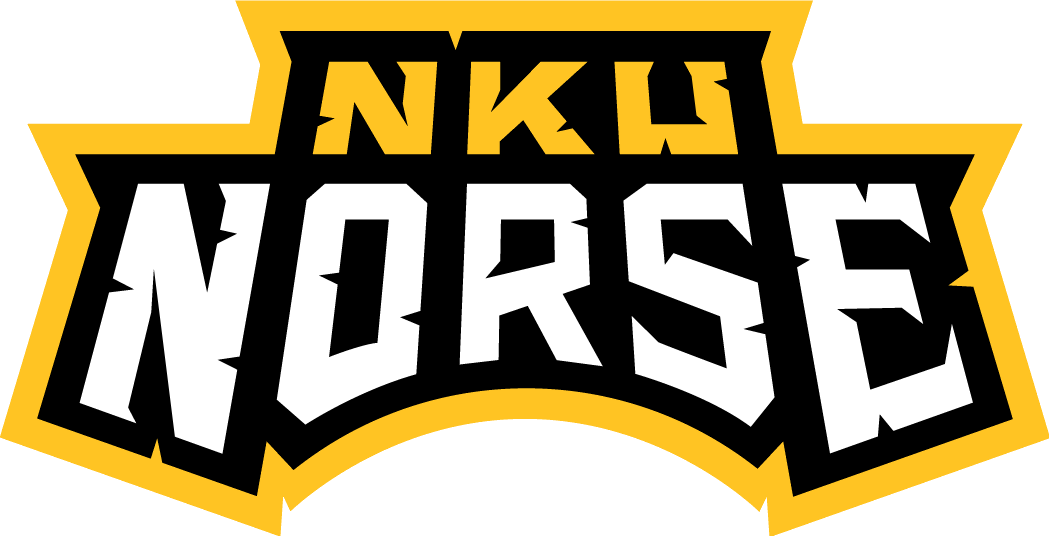
- Conference: Horizon League
- Record: 14–11 (11–7 Horizon)
- Head coach: Darrin Horn (2nd season)
- Assistant coaches: David Harris; Eric Haut; Simon McCormack
- Home arena: BB&T Arena

2020–21 Horizon League men's basketball standings
	Conf.				Overall
Team	W		L	PCT	W		L	PCT
Wright State	16	–	4	.800	18	–	6	.750
Cleveland State †	16	–	4	.800	19	–	8	.704
Detroit Mercy	10	–	6	.625	12	–	10	.545
Northern Kentucky	11	–	7	.611	14	–	11	.560
Oakland	10	–	10	.500	12	–	18	.400
Youngstown State	9	–	11	.450	15	–	12	.556
IUPUI	7	–	9	.438	8	–	10	.444
Milwaukee	7	–	10	.412	10	–	12	.455
Green Bay	8	–	12	.400	8	–	17	.320
UIC	6	–	10	.375	9	–	13	.409
Purdue Fort Wayne	6	–	14	.300	8	–	15	.348
Robert Morris	3	–	12	.200	4	–	15	.211
† 2021 Horizon League tournament winner

The 2020–21 Northern Kentucky Norse men's basketball team represented Northern Kentucky University in the 2020–21 NCAA Division I men's basketball season. The Norse, led by second-year head coach Darrin Horn, played their home games at BB&T Arena in Highland Heights, Kentucky as members of the Horizon League.

== Previous season ==
The Norse finished the 2019–20 season 23–9, 13–5 in Horizon League play to finish in second place. They defeated Green Bay and UIC to become champions of the Horizon League tournament. They received the Horizon League's automatic bid to the NCAA tournament. However, the NCAA Tournament was cancelled amid the COVID-19 pandemic.

== Roster ==
2020–21 Northern Kentucky Norse men's basketball team
Players
Coaches

Pos.	#	Name	Height	Weight	Year	Previous school	Hometown
G	0	Trey Robinson	6 ft 6 in (1.98 m)	200 lb (91 kg)	RS Fr	Hamilton HS	Hamilton, Ohio
G	1	Adham Eleeda	6 ft 5 in (1.96 m)	205 lb (93 kg)	Sr	Sheridan College	Toronto, Ontario
G	2	Paul Djoko	6 ft 4 in (1.93 m)	200 lb (91 kg)	RS Jr	Châlons-Reims	Strasbourg, France
G	3	Marques Warrick	6 ft 2 in (1.88 m)	170 lb (77 kg)	Fr	Henry Clay HS	Lexington, Kentucky
F	4	Adrian Nelson	6 ft 7 in (2.01 m)	220 lb (100 kg)	Jr	Pickerington Central HS	Pickerington, Ohio
G	5	Darius Harding	6 ft 4 in (1.93 m)	215 lb (98 kg)	Jr	Motlow State CC	Elizabethtown, Kentucky
F	10	John Harge	6 ft 8 in (2.03 m)	220 lb (100 kg)	RS Fr	Hillcrest Prep	Aurora, Colorado
G	11	Bryson Langdon	5 ft 9 in (1.75 m)	170 lb (77 kg)	Jr	Arizona Western	Chicago, Illinois
G	12	Trevon Faulkner	6 ft 3 in (1.91 m)	190 lb (86 kg)	Jr	Mercer County HS	Harrodsburg, Kentucky
F	13	David Böhm	6 ft 9 in (2.06 m)	220 lb (100 kg)	Fr	Montverde Academy	Prague, Czech Republic
G	24	Jake Evans	6 ft 1 in (1.85 m)	170 lb (77 kg)	Fr	Male HS	Louisville, Kentucky
G/F	30	Bryant Mocaby	6 ft 5 in (1.96 m)	200 lb (91 kg)	So	Derby	Derby, Kansas
C	42	Noah Hupmann	7 ft 1 in (2.16 m)	205 lb (93 kg)	Fr	Covington Catholic HS	Union, Kentucky
F/C	44	David Wassler	6 ft 10 in (2.08 m)	225 lb (102 kg)	Jr	St. Xavier HS	Cincinnati, Ohio
G	52	Carlos Hines	6 ft 4 in (1.93 m)	185 lb (84 kg)	RS Jr	Northern Arizona	Chicago, Illinois

Head coach

- Darrin Horn (Western Kentucky)

Assistant coach(es)

- David Harris (Ashland)
- Eric Haut (Kent State)
- Simon McCormack (American)

Legend

- (C) Team captain
- (S) Suspended
- (I) Ineligible
- (W) Walk-on
- Injured
- Current redshirt

Roster
Last update: December 17, 2020

== Schedule and results ==
Date time, TV	Rank^{#}	Opponent^{#}	Result	Record	Site (attendance) city, state
Non-conference regular season
November 25, 2020*; 6:00 pm, ESPN3		Ball State	W 74–73	1–0	BB&T Arena; Highland Heights, KY
December 3, 2020*; 6:00 pm, ESPN3		Tennessee Tech	W 74–65	2–0	BB&T Arena; Highland Heights, KY
December 5, 2020*; 2:00 pm, ESPN+		at Chattanooga	L 72–79	2–1	McKenzie Arena; Chattanooga, TN
December 8, 2020*; 7:00 pm, ESPN+		at Dayton	L 60–66	2–2	UD Arena; Dayton, OH
December 13, 2020*; 2:00 pm		at Kent State	L 73–92	2–3	MAC Center; Kent, OH
Horizon League regular season
December 19, 2020; 2:00 pm, ESPN3		Youngstown State	W 79–64	3–3 (1–0)	BB&T Arena; Highland Heights, KY
December 20, 2020; 3:00 pm, ESPN2		Youngstown State	L 60–70	3–4 (1–1)	BB&T Arena; Highland Heights, KY
December 26, 2020; 7:00 pm		Oakland	Cancelled		Athletics Center O'rena; Auburn Hills, MI
December 27, 2020; 6:00 pm		Oakland	Cancelled		Athletics Center O'rena; Auburn Hills, MI
January 1, 2021; 6:00 pm, ESPN3		Purdue Fort Wayne	W 75–68	4–4 (2–1)	BB&T Arena; Highland Heights, KY
January 2, 2021; 6:00 pm, ESPN3		Purdue Fort Wayne	W 70–68	5–4 (3–1)	BB&T Arena; Highland Heights, KY
January 8, 2021; 7:00 pm, ESPN+		at Cleveland State	L 44–58	5–5 (3–2)	Wolstein Center; Cleveland, OH
January 9, 2021; 7:00 pm, ESPN+		at Cleveland State	L 71–74 ^{OT}	5–6 (3–3)	Wolstein Center; Cleveland, OH
January 15, 2021; 6:00 pm, ESPN3		IUPUI	L 69–74	5–7 (3–4)	BB&T Arena; Highland Heights, KY
January 16, 2021; 6:00 pm, ESPN3		IUPUI	L 63–65	5–8 (3–5)	BB&T Arena; Highland Heights, KY
January 22, 2021; 7:00 pm, ESPN3		at Robert Morris	W 81–76	6–8 (4–5)	UPMC Events Center; Moon Township, PA
January 23, 2021; 5:00 pm, ESPN3		at Robert Morris	W 79–74 ^{OT}	7–8 (5–5)	UPMC Events Center; Moon Township, PA
January 29, 2021; 6:00 pm, ESPN+		UIC	W 72–68	8–8 (6–5)	BB&T Arena; Highland Heights, KY
January 30, 2021; 5:00 pm, ESPN+		UIC	W 69–67	9–8 (7–5)	BB&T Arena; Highland Heights, KY
February 5, 2021; 6:00 pm, ESPN3		at Milwaukee	W 87–73	10–8 (8–5)	UW–Milwaukee Panther Arena; Milwaukee, WI
February 6, 2021; 3:00 pm, ESPN3		at Milwaukee	W 79–65	11–8 (9–5)	UW–Milwaukee Panther Arena; Milwaukee, WI
February 12, 2021; 5:00 pm, ESPN3		at Green Bay	L 82–86	11–9 (9–6)	Kress Events Center; Green Bay, WI
February 13, 2021; 5:00 pm, ESPN3		at Green Bay	W 71–66	12–9 (10–6)	Kress Events Center; Green Bay, WI
February 19, 2021; 6:00 pm, ESPN3		Wright State	W 81–75	13–9 (11–6)	BB&T Arena; Highland Heights, KY
February 20, 2021; 5:00 pm, ESPN3		Wright State	L 71–77	13–10 (11–7)	BB&T Arena; Highland Heights, KY
Horizon League tournament
March 2, 2021; 7:00 pm, ESPN+	(4)	(5) Detroit Mercy; Quarterfinals	W 70–69	14–10	BB&T Arena; Highland Heights, KY
March 8, 2021; 9:30 pm, ESPN+	(4)	vs. (3) Oakland; Semifinals	L 58–69	14–11	Indiana Farmers Coliseum; Indianapolis, IN
*Non-conference game. ^{#}Rankings from AP Poll. (#) Tournament seedings in parentheses. All times are in Eastern.
