= 2020–21 Green Bay Phoenix men's basketball team =

American college basketball season

2020–21 Green Bay Phoenix men's basketball
- Conference: Horizon League
- Record: 8–17 (8–12 Horizon)
- Head coach: Will Ryan (1st season)
- Associate head coach: Jared Swanson
- Assistant coaches: Freddie Owens; Brandon Pritzl
- Home arena: Kress Events Center

2020–21 Horizon League men's basketball standings
	Conf.				Overall
Team	W		L	PCT	W		L	PCT
Wright State	16	–	4	.800	18	–	6	.750
Cleveland State †	16	–	4	.800	19	–	8	.704
Detroit Mercy	10	–	6	.625	12	–	10	.545
Northern Kentucky	11	–	7	.611	14	–	11	.560
Oakland	10	–	10	.500	12	–	18	.400
Youngstown State	9	–	11	.450	15	–	12	.556
IUPUI	7	–	9	.438	8	–	10	.444
Milwaukee	7	–	10	.412	10	–	12	.455
Green Bay	8	–	12	.400	8	–	17	.320
UIC	6	–	10	.375	9	–	13	.409
Purdue Fort Wayne	6	–	14	.300	8	–	15	.348
Robert Morris	3	–	12	.200	4	–	15	.211
† 2021 Horizon League tournament winner

The 2020–21 Green Bay Phoenix men's basketball team represented the University of Wisconsin–Green Bay in the 2020–21 NCAA Division I men's basketball season. The Phoenix, led by first-year head coach Will Ryan, played their home games at the Kress Events Center in Green Bay, Wisconsin as members of the Horizon League. The Phoenix finished the season 8–17, 8–12 in Horizon League play, to finish in ninth place.

== Previous season ==
The Phoenix finished the 2019–20 season 17–16, 11–7 in Horizon League play, to finish in third place. They defeated Oakland in the quarterfinals of the Horizon League tournament before losing in the semifinals to Northern Kentucky.

On May 17, 2020, head coach Linc Darner was fired. He finished at Green Bay with a five-year record of 92–80.

== Roster ==
2020–21 Green Bay Phoenix men's basketball team
Players
Coaches

Pos.	#	Name	Height	Weight	Year	Hometown
G	0	Josh Jefferson	6 ft 2 in (1.88 m)	190 lb (86 kg)	RS Sr	New Albany, IN
G	1	Amari Davis	6 ft 3 in (1.91 m)	170 lb (77 kg)	So	Trotwood, OH
G	2	PJ Pipes	6 ft 2 in (1.88 m)	190 lb (86 kg)	Sr	Woodridge, IL
G	3	Japannah Kellogg III	6 ft 8 in (2.03 m)	190 lb (86 kg)	RS Fr	Ames, IA
G	4	Blayton Williams	6 ft 3 in (1.91 m)	175 lb (79 kg)	Jr	West Memphis, AR
G	5	Lucas Stieber	6 ft 3 in (1.91 m)	185 lb (84 kg)	RS Fr	Green Bay, WI
G	10	Damontae Taylor	6 ft 6 in (1.98 m)	185 lb (84 kg)	Fr	Zion, IL
G	11	Jacob Jones	5 ft 10 in (1.78 m)	170 lb (77 kg)	Fr	Jeffersonville, IN
F	12	Cem Kirciman	6 ft 8 in (2.03 m)	220 lb (100 kg)	Fr	Bursa, Turkey
F	13	Ryan Chlaflin	6 ft 6 in (1.98 m)	190 lb (86 kg)	Fr	Brussels, WI
F	14	Paris Taylor	6 ft 6 in (1.98 m)	200 lb (91 kg)	Jr	Bolivar, TN
G	15	Colin Schaefer	6 ft 0 in (1.83 m)	170 lb (77 kg)	Fr	Sun Prairie, WI
G	20	Jiovanni Miles	6 ft 2 in (1.88 m)	190 lb (86 kg)	So	Novi, MI
F	21	Terrance Thompson	6 ft 8 in (2.03 m)	220 lb (100 kg)	Fr	La Crosse, WI
F	23	Emmanuel Ansong	6 ft 4 in (1.93 m)	195 lb (88 kg)	Jr	Bordentown, NJ
G	32	Donavan Moore	6 ft 3 in (1.91 m)	180 lb (82 kg)	RS Fr	Hillsboro, IL

Head coach

- Will Ryan (Milwaukee)

Assistant coach(es)

- Jared Swanson (Concordia-Moorhead)
- Freddie Owens (Wisconsin)
- Brandon Pritzl (Hillsdale)

Legend

- (C) Team captain
- (S) Suspended
- (I) Ineligible
- (W) Walk-on
- Injured
- Current redshirt

Roster
Last update: December 25, 2020

== Schedule and results ==
Date time, TV	Rank^{#}	Opponent^{#}	Result	Record	Site (attendance) city, state
Non-conference regular season
November 25, 2020*; 6:00 p.m., BTN+		at Minnesota	L 69–99	0–1	Williams Arena; Minneapolis, MN
December 1, 2020*; 4:00 p.m., BTN		at No. 4 Wisconsin	L 42–82	0–2	Kohl Center; Madison, WI
December 5, 2020*; 2:00 p.m., ESPN3		Eastern Illinois	L 91–93 ^{2OT}	0–3	Kress Events Center; Green Bay, WI
December 8, 2020*; 8:00 p.m., FS1		at Marquette	L 68–82	0–4	Fiserv Forum; Milwaukee, WI
Horizon League regular season
December 19, 2020; 1:00 p.m., ESPN3		Milwaukee	L 65–68	0–5 (0–1)	Krees Events Center; Green Bay, WI
December 20, 2020; 1:00 p.m., ESPN3		Milwaukee	L 62–74	0–6 (0–2)	Kress Events Center; Green Bay, WI
December 26, 2020; 3:00 p.m., ESPN3		at Wright State	L 53–67	0–7 (0–3)	Nutter Center; Fairborn, OH
December 27, 2020; 1:00 p.m., ESPN3		at Wright State	L 77–90	0–8 (0–4)	Nutter Center; Fairborn, OH
January 1, 2020; 3:00 p.m., ESPN+		at Youngstown State	L 77–84	0–9 (0–5)	Beeghly Center; Youngstown, OH
January 2, 2020; 3:00 p.m., ESPN3		at Youngstown State	W 79–69	1–9 (1–5)	Beeghly Center; Youngstown, OH
January 8, 2021; 4:00 p.m., ESPN+		Oakland	W 84–81 ^{OT}	2–9 (2–5)	Kress Events Center; Green Bay, WI
January 9, 2021; 4:00 p.m., ESPN+		Oakland	W 87–78	3–9 (3–5)	Kress Events Center; Green Bay, WI
January 15, 2021; 6:00 p.m., ESPN+		at Detroit Mercy	L 61–86	3–10 (3–6)	Calihan Hall; Detroit, MI
January 16, 2021; 6:00 p.m., ESPN+		at Detroit Mercy	L 65–68	3–11 (3–7)	Calihan Hall; Detroit, MI
January 22, 2021; 6:00 p.m., ESPN3		Purdue Fort Wayne	W 77–59	4–11 (4–7)	Kress Events Center; Green Bay, WI
January 23, 2021; 4:00 p.m., ESPN3		Purdue Fort Wayne	W 87–72	5–11 (5–7)	Kress Events Center; Green Bay, WI
January 29, 2021; 6:00 p.m., ESPN3		at Cleveland State	L 68–74	5–12 (5–8)	Wolstein Center; Cleveland, OH
January 30, 2021; 6:00 p.m., ESPN3		at Cleveland State	L 65–73	5–13 (5–9)	Wolstein Center; Cleveland, OH
February 5, 2021; 6:00 am, ESPN3		IUPUI	L 71–80	5–14 (5–10)	Kress Events Center; Green Bay, WI
February 6, 2021; 4:00 p.m., ESPN3		IUPUI	W 79–72	6–14 (6–10)	Kress Events Center; Green Bay, WI
February 12, 2021; 4:00 p.m., ESPN3		Northern Kentucky	W 86–82	7–14 (7–10)	Kress Events Center; Green Bay, WI
February 13, 2021; 4:00 p.m., ESPN3		Northern Kentucky	L 66–71	7–15 (7–11)	Kress Events Center; Green Bay, WI
February 19, 2021; 7:00 p.m., ESPN3		at UIC	L 58–61	7–16 (7–12)	Credit Union 1 Arena; Chicago, IL
February 20, 2021; 7:00 p.m., ESPN3		at UIC	W 69–59	8–16 (8–12)	Credit Union 1 Arena; Chicago, IL
Horizon League tournament
February 25, 2021; 7:00 p.m., ESPN+	(7)	(10) Purdue Fort Wayne; First round	L 84–89 ^{2OT}	8–17	Kress Events Center; Green Bay, WI
*Non-conference game. ^{#}Rankings from AP poll. (#) Tournament seedings in parentheses. All times are in Central.
