= 2020–21 Cleveland State Vikings men's basketball team =

American college basketball season

2020–21 Cleveland State Vikings men's basketball

Horizon League regular-season co-champions & Horizon League tournament champions

NCAA tournament, First Round
- Conference: Horizon League
- Record: 19–8 (16–4 Horizon)
- Head coach: Dennis Gates (2nd season)
- Assistant coaches: Rob Summers; Dru Joyce III; Ryan Sharbaugh
- Home arena: Wolstein Center

2020–21 Horizon League men's basketball standings
	Conf.				Overall
Team	W		L	PCT	W		L	PCT
Wright State	16	–	4	.800	18	–	6	.750
Cleveland State †	16	–	4	.800	19	–	8	.704
Detroit Mercy	10	–	6	.625	12	–	10	.545
Northern Kentucky	11	–	7	.611	14	–	11	.560
Oakland	10	–	10	.500	12	–	18	.400
Youngstown State	9	–	11	.450	15	–	12	.556
IUPUI	7	–	9	.438	8	–	10	.444
Milwaukee	7	–	10	.412	10	–	12	.455
Green Bay	8	–	12	.400	8	–	17	.320
UIC	6	–	10	.375	9	–	13	.409
Purdue Fort Wayne	6	–	14	.300	8	–	15	.348
Robert Morris	3	–	12	.200	4	–	15	.211
† 2021 Horizon League tournament winner

The 2020–21 Cleveland State Vikings men's basketball team represented Cleveland State University in the 2020–21 NCAA Division I men's basketball season. The Vikings, led by second-year head coach Dennis Gates, played their home games at the Wolstein Center in Cleveland, Ohio as members of the Horizon League. They finished the season 19–8, 16–4 in Horizon League play, to finish as regular-season co-champions. They defeated Purdue Fort Wayne, Milwaukee and Oakland to be champions of the Horizon League tournament. They received the conference's automatic bid to the NCAA tournament where they lost in the first round to Houston.

== Previous season ==
The Vikings finished the 2019–20 season 11–21, 7–11 in Horizon League play, to finish in a tie for seventh place. They lost in the first round of the Horizon League tournament to Oakland.

== Roster ==
2020–21 Cleveland State Vikings men's basketball team
Players
Coaches

Pos.	#	Name	Height	Weight	Year	Hometown
G	0	Alec Oglesby	6 ft 5 in (1.96 m)	187 lb (85 kg)	Fr	Gainesville, FL
G	1	Demetrius Terry	6 ft 0 in (1.83 m)	175 lb (79 kg)	Fr	Cleveland, OH
G	2	Yahel Hill	6 ft 0 in (1.83 m)	170 lb (77 kg)	Jr	Cleveland, OH
G	3	Craig Beaudion	6 ft 3 in (1.91 m)	170 lb (77 kg)	Sr	Chicago, IL
G	4	Franklyn Jr. Penn	6 ft 3 in (1.91 m)	190 lb (86 kg)	Sr	Hunthum's Ghut, British Virgin Islands
G	5	Tre Gomillion	6 ft 4 in (1.93 m)	215 lb (98 kg)	Jr	Augusta, GA
F	11	Jayson Woodrich	6 ft 7 in (2.01 m)	195 lb (88 kg)	Fr	Beachwood, OH
F	12	Algevon Eichelberger	6 ft 8 in (2.03 m)	250 lb (113 kg)	Sr	Saginaw, MI
F	13	Chris Greene	6 ft 8 in (2.03 m)	210 lb (95 kg)	Jr	Newport News, VA
G	20	Aria Eskandari	6 ft 3 in (1.91 m)	190 lb (86 kg)	Jr	Sanford, FL
G	21	Jeremy Sanchez	6 ft 0 in (1.83 m)	170 lb (77 kg)	So	North Ridgeville, OH
G	23	Hugo Ferreira	6 ft 1 in (1.85 m)	165 lb (75 kg)	So	Vila Nova de Gaia, Portugal
F	24	Torrey Patton	6 ft 5 in (1.96 m)	195 lb (88 kg)	Sr	Dayton, OH
G	31	Ben Sternberg	6 ft 0 in (1.83 m)	152 lb (69 kg)	Jr	Cleveland, OH
F	35	Deante Johnson	6 ft 9 in (2.06 m)	210 lb (95 kg)	Jr	Detroit, MI
C	50	Mabor Majak	7 ft 2 in (2.18 m)	230 lb (104 kg)	Fr	South Sudan
G	55	D'Moi Hodge	6 ft 4 in (1.93 m)	180 lb (82 kg)	Jr	Tortola, British Virgin Islands

Head coach

- Dennis Gates (California)

Assistant coach(es)

- Rob Summers (West Virginia)
- Dru Joyce III (Akron)
- Ryan Sharbaugh (Westminster)

Legend

- (C) Team captain
- (S) Suspended
- (I) Ineligible
- (W) Walk-on
- Injured
- Current redshirt

Roster
Last update: August 16, 2024

== Schedule and results ==
Date time, TV	Rank^{#}	Opponent^{#}	Result	Record	Site (attendance) city, state
Regular season
December 1, 2020*; 7:00 p.m., ESPN3		at Toledo	L 61–70	0–1	Savage Arena; Toledo, OH
December 6, 2020*; 2:00 p.m., ESPN3		at Ohio	L 46–101	0–2	Convocation Center; Athens, OH
December 13, 2020*; 8:00 p.m., BTN		at No. 22 Ohio State	L 67–71	0–3	Value City Arena; Columbus, OH
December 19, 2020; 7:00 p.m., ESPN3		at Purdue Fort Wayne	W 63–61	1–3 (1–0)	Hilliard Gates Sports Center; Fort Wayne, IN
December 20, 2020; 5:00 p.m., ESPN3		at Purdue Fort Wayne	W 89–80	2–3 (2–0)	Hilliard Gates Sports Center; Fort Wayne, IN
December 26, 2020; 1:00 p.m., ESPN3		Youngstown State	W 87–69	3–3 (3–0)	Wolstein Center; Cleveland, OH
December 27, 2020; 2:00 p.m., ESPN3		Youngstown State	W 81–74	4–3 (4–0)	Wolstein Center; Cleveland, OH
January 1, 2021; 2:00 p.m., ESPN+		at IUPUI	W 65–62	5–3 (5–0)	Indiana Farmers Coliseum; Indianapolis, IN
January 2, 2021; 12:00 p.m., ESPN+		at IUPUI	W 59–49	6–3 (6–0)	Indiana Farmers Coliseum; Indianapolis, IN
January 8, 2021; 7:00 p.m., ESPN+		Northern Kentucky	W 58–44	7–3 (7–0)	Wolstein Center; Cleveland, OH
January 9, 2021; 7:00 p.m., ESPN+		Northern Kentucky	W 74–71	8–3 (8–0)	Wolstein Center; Cleveland, OH
January 15, 2021; 7:00 p.m., ESPNU		at Wright State	W 66-64	9–3 (9–0)	Nutter Center; Fairborn, OH
January 16, 2021; 7:00 p.m., ESPN3		at Wright State	L 49–85	9–4 (9–1)	Nutter Center; Fairborn, OH
January 22, 2021; 7:00 p.m., ESPN2		Milwaukee	W 64–53	10–4 (10–1)	Wolstein Center; Cleveland, OH
January 23, 2021; 5:00 p.m., ESPN3		Milwaukee	L 80–81 ^{OT}	10–5 (10–2)	Wolstein Center; Cleveland, OH
January 29, 2021; 7:00 p.m., ESPN3		Green Bay	W 74–68	11–5 (11–2)	Wolstein Center; Cleveland, OH
January 30, 2021; 7:00 p.m., ESPN3		Green Bay	W 73–65	12–5 (12–2)	Wolstein Center; Cleveland, OH
February 5, 2021; 7:00 p.m., ESPN3		at Oakland	W 80–72	13–5 (13–2)	Athletics Center O'rena; Auburn Hills, MI
February 6, 2021; 5:00 p.m., ESPN3		at Oakland	W 80–72	14–5 (14–2)	Athletics Center O'rena; Auburn Hills, MI
February 12, 2021; 7:00 p.m., ESPNU		Detroit Mercy	L 83–89	14–6 (14–3)	Wolstein Center; Cleveland, OH
February 13, 2021; 7:00 p.m., ESPNU		Detroit Mercy	W 71–64	15–6 (15–3)	Wolstein Center; Cleveland, OH
February 19, 2021; 7:00 p.m., ESPN+		at Purdue Fort Wayne	L 68–75	15–7 (15–4)	Hilliard Gates Sports Center; Fort Wayne, IN
February 20, 2021; 5:00 p.m., ESPN+		at Purdue Fort Wayne	W 67–55	16–7 (16–4)	Hilliard Gates Sports Center; Fort Wayne, IN
Horizon League tournament
March 2, 2021; 7:00 p.m., ESPN+	(1)	(10) Purdue Fort Wayne; Quarterfinals	W 108–104 ^{3OT}	17–7	Wolstein Center; Cleveland, OH
March 8, 2021; 6:30 p.m., ESPN+	(1)	vs. (8) Milwaukee; Semifinals	W 71–65	18–7	Indiana Farmers Coliseum; Indianapolis, IN
March 9, 2021; 7:00 p.m., ESPN	(1)	vs. (3) Oakland; Championship	W 80–69	19–7	Indiana Farmers Coliseum; Indianapolis, IN
NCAA tournament
March 19, 2021; 7:15 p.m., truTV	(15 MW)	vs. (2 MW) No. 6 Houston; First round	L 56–87	19–8	Simon Skjodt Assembly Hall; Bloomington, IN
*Non-conference game. ^{#}Rankings from AP poll. (#) Tournament seedings in parentheses. All times are in Eastern.
