= 2020–21 UIC Flames men's basketball team =

American college basketball season

2020–21 UIC Flames men's basketball
- Conference: Horizon League
- Record: 9–13 (6–10 Horizon)
- Head coach: Luke Yaklich (1st season)
- Assistant coaches: Dee Brown (4th season); Brock Erickson (1st season); Will Veasley (1st season)
- Home arena: Credit Union 1 Arena

2020–21 Horizon League men's basketball standings
	Conf.				Overall
Team	W		L	PCT	W		L	PCT
Wright State	16	–	4	.800	18	–	6	.750
Cleveland State †	16	–	4	.800	19	–	8	.704
Detroit Mercy	10	–	6	.625	12	–	10	.545
Northern Kentucky	11	–	7	.611	14	–	11	.560
Oakland	10	–	10	.500	12	–	18	.400
Youngstown State	9	–	11	.450	15	–	12	.556
IUPUI	7	–	9	.438	8	–	10	.444
Milwaukee	7	–	10	.412	10	–	12	.455
Green Bay	8	–	12	.400	8	–	17	.320
UIC	6	–	10	.375	9	–	13	.409
Purdue Fort Wayne	6	–	14	.300	8	–	15	.348
Robert Morris	3	–	12	.200	4	–	15	.211
† 2021 Horizon League tournament winner

The 2020–21 UIC Flames men's basketball team represented the University of Illinois at Chicago in the 2020–21 NCAA Division I men's basketball season. The Flames, led by first-year head coach Luke Yaklich, played their home games at Credit Union 1 Arena in Chicago, Illinois as members of the Horizon League.

== Previous season ==
They finished the season 18–17, 10–8 in Horizon League to play to finish in a tie for fourth place. As the No. 4 seed in the Horizon League tournament, they defeated IUPUI, Youngstown State, and top-seeded Wright State to advance to the championship game. There they lost to Northern Kentucky.

== Offseason ==
=== Departures ===
UIC Departures
Name	Number	Pos.	Height	Weight	Year	Hometown	Notes
Jordan Blount	13	F	6'8"	220	Senior	Cork, Ireland	Graduated, went professional overseas signing with Basket Navarra Club
Godwin Boahen	22	F	5'11"	180	Senior	Toronto, ON	Graduated
Tarkus Ferguson	4	G	6'4"	190	Senior	Belleville, IL	Graduated, went professional overseas signing with Vevey Riviera Basket
Marcus Ottey	1	G	6'2"	185	Senior	Ajax, ON	Graduated
Travell Washington	32	F	6'9"	230	Junior	San Bernardino, CA	

=== Incoming transfers ===
Name	Number	Pos.	Height	Weight	Year	Hometown	Previous School
Maurice Commander	1	G	6'0	175	Junior	Chicago, IL	Chattanooga
Zion Griffin	35	F	6'6	215	Junior	Darien, IL	Iowa State
Jalen Johnson	5	G	6'1	180	Junior	Hopkinsville, KY	John A. Logan College
Teyvion Kirk	4	G	6'4	185	Junior	Joliet, IL	Colorado State
RayQuawndis Mitchell	21	G	6'5	205	Junior	Atlanta, GA	Otero Junior College

=== Recruiting class of 2020 ===
College recruiting information
Name	Hometown	School	Height	Weight	Commit date
Demetrius Calip II; SG	Woodland Hills, CA	Taft High School	6 ft 4 in (1.93 m)	155 lb (70 kg)	Aug 3, 2020
Demetrius Calip II; SG	Recruit ratings: Scout: Rivals: 247Sports: (NR)				
Brad Bowditch; G	Milton, WI	IMG Academy	6 ft 0 in (1.83 m)	180 lb (82 kg)	Aug 3, 2020
Brad Bowditch; G	Recruit ratings: (NR)				
Griffin Yaklich; SF	Joliet, IL	Saline High School	6 ft 6 in (1.98 m)	200 lb (91 kg)	Jun 17, 2020
Griffin Yaklich; SF	Recruit ratings: Scout: Rivals: (NR)				
Overall recruit ranking:
Note: In many cases, Scout, Rivals, 247Sports, On3, and ESPN may conflict in their listings of height and weight.; In these cases, the average was taken. ESPN grades are on a 100-point scale.; Sources: "2020 Team Ranking". Rivals.

== Roster ==
2020–21 UIC Flames men's basketball team
Players
Coaches

Pos.	#	Name	Height	Weight	Year	Hometown
G	0	Brian Taylor	6 ft 6 in (1.98 m)	205 lb (93 kg)	So	Detroit, Michigan
G	1	Maurice Commander	6 ft 0 in (1.83 m)	175 lb (79 kg)	Jr	Chicago, IL
F	2	Michael Diggins	6 ft 8 in (2.03 m)	195 lb (88 kg)	Sr	Las Vegas, Nevada
F	3	Jacob Wiley	6 ft 7 in (2.01 m)	210 lb (95 kg)	Sr	Houston, Texas
G	4	Teyvion Kirk	6 ft 4 in (1.93 m)	185 lb (84 kg)	RS Sr	Joliet, IL
G	5	Jalen Johnson	6 ft 1 in (1.85 m)	180 lb (82 kg)	Jr	Hopkinsville, KY
F	10	Deon Ejim	6 ft 6 in (1.98 m)	250 lb (113 kg)	RS So	Toronto, Ontario, Canada
G	13	Demetrius Calip II	6 ft 4 in (1.93 m)	165 lb (75 kg)	Fr	Woodland Hills CA
G	14	Brad Bowditch (W)	6 ft 0 in (1.83 m)	180 lb (82 kg)	Fr	Milton, WI
G	15	Griffin Yaklich (W)	6 ft 6 in (1.98 m)	200 lb (91 kg)	Fr	Joliet, IL
G	20	Jamie Ahale	6 ft 5 in (1.96 m)	205 lb (93 kg)	Sr	Montrose, Australia
G	21	RayQuawndis Mitchell	6 ft 5 in (1.96 m)	205 lb (93 kg)	Jr	Atlanta, GA
F	22	Rob Howard	6 ft 8 in (2.03 m)	230 lb (104 kg)	RS Sr	Gary, Indiana
F	23	Braelen Bridges	6 ft 10 in (2.08 m)	235 lb (107 kg)	RS Jr	McDonough, Georgia
F	25	Treavon Martin (W)	6 ft 8 in (2.03 m)	210 lb (95 kg)	Jr	Chicago, IL
F	35	Zion Griffin	6 ft 6 in (1.98 m)	215 lb (98 kg)	Jr	Darien, IL

Head coach

- Luke Yaklich (Illinois State)

Assistant coach(es)

- Dee Brown (Illinois)
- Brock Erickson (Rhode Island)
- Will Veasley (Butler)

Legend

- (C) Team captain
- (S) Suspended
- (I) Ineligible
- (W) Walk-on
- Injured
- Current redshirt

Roster
Last update: November 26, 2020

== Schedule and results ==
On November 25, 2020, UIC announced that fans would not be permitted to attend home games for their first two home games. However, they did leave open the possibility to allow fans for future events.

Date time, TV	Rank^{#}	Opponent^{#}	Result	Record	High points	High rebounds	High assists	Site (attendance) city, state
Non-conference regular season
November 25, 2020*; 6:00 pm		at Northern Illinois	W 65–61	1–0	12 – Tied	6 – Kirk	9 – Kirk	Convocation Center; DeKalb, IL
November 28, 2020*; 6:00 pm, ESPN3		Central Michigan; UIC Basketball Invitational	W 74–72	2–0	23 – Mitchell	13 – Bridges	6 – Kirk	Credit Union 1 Arena; Chicago, IL
December 1, 2020*; 6:00 pm, ESPN3		Valparaiso; UIC Basketball Invitational	W 66–50	3–0	14 – Kirk	8 – Kirk	14 – Kirk	Credit Union 1 Arena; Chicago, IL
December 5, 2020*; 1:00 pm, ESPN3		at Ball State	L 66–68	3–1	13 – Tied	8 – Kirk	6 – Kirk	Worthen Arena; Muncie, IN
December 13, 2020*; 1:00 pm, ESPN+		Loyola–Chicago	L 66–77	3–2	17 – Kirk	9 – Diggins	5 – Kirk	Credit Union 1 Arena; Chicago, IL
Horizon League regular season
December 19, 2020; 6:00 pm, ESPN+		Oakland	W 74–72	4–2 (1–0)	25 – Ahale	9 – Howard	11 – Kirk	Credit Union 1 Arena; Chicago, IL
December 20, 2020; 4:00 pm, ESPN+		Oakland	W 90–73	5–2 (2–0)	23 – Howard	11 – Kirk	11 – Kirk	Credit Union 1 Arena; Chicago, IL
December 26, 2020; 2:00 pm, ESPN+		at Milwaukee	Cancelled due to COVID-19 issues					Klotsche Center; Milwaukee, WI
December 27, 2020; 2:00 pm, ESPN+		at Milwaukee	Cancelled due to COVID-19 issues					Klotsche Center; Milwaukee, WI
January 1, 2021; 3:00 pm, ESPN3		Detroit Mercy	Cancelled due to mental health reasons					Credit Union 1 Arena; Chicago, IL
January 2, 2021; 3:00 pm, ESPN3		Detroit Mercy	Cancelled due to mental health reasons					Credit Union 1 Arena; Chicago, IL
January 8, 2021; 6:00 pm, ESPN3		at Purdue Fort Wayne	L 89–96 ^{OT}	5–3 (2–1)	31 – Kirk	11 – Diggins	6 – Kirk	Hilliard Gates Sports Center; Fort Wayne, IN
January 9, 2021; 4:00 pm, ESPN3		at Purdue Fort Wayne	L 55–88	5–4 (2–2)	23 – Diggins	4 – Tied	5 – Kirk	Hilliard Gates Sports Center; Fort Wayne, IN
January 15, 2021; 7:00 pm, ESPN3		Robert Morris	W 67–53	6–4 (3–2)	16 – Diggins	10 – Kirk	4 – Kirk	Credit Union 1 Arena; Chicago, IL
January 16, 2021; 5:00 pm, ESPN3		Robert Morris	W 66–62 ^{OT}	7–4 (4–2)	18 – Howard	8 – Tied	3 – 3 Tied	Credit Union 1 Arena; Chicago, IL
January 22, 2021; 4:00 pm, ESPN3		at Youngstown State	W 67–66	8–4 (5–2)	15 – Kirk	10 – Tied	5 – Kirk	Beeghly Center; Youngstown, OH
January 23, 2021; 4:00 pm, ESPN3		at Youngstown State	L 77–85	8–5 (5–3)	18 – Commander	7 – Kirk	5 – Kirk	Beeghly Center; Youngstown, OH
January 29, 2021; 5:00 pm, ESPN+		at Northern Kentucky	L 68–72	8–6 (5–4)	15 – Griffin	8 – Howard	5 – Griffin	BB&T Arena; Highland Heights, KY
January 30, 2021; 4:00 pm, ESPN+		at Northern Kentucky	L 67–69	8–7 (5–5)	17 – Bridges	8 – Bridges	4 – Commander	BB&T Arena; Highland Heights, KY
February 5, 2021; 7:00 pm, ESPN+		Wright State	L 47–72	8–8 (5–6)	10 – Commander	7 – Bridges	2 – 3 Tied	Credit Union 1 Arena; Chicago, IL
February 6, 2021; 7:00 pm, ESPN+		Wright State	L 57–77	8–9 (5–7)	16 – Diggins	10 – Kirk	2 – Tied	Credit Union 1 Arena; Chicago, IL
February 12, 2021; 12:00 pm, ESPN+		at IUPUI	L 69–89	8–10 (5–8)	19 – Kirk	5 – Tied	6 – Kirk	Indiana Farmers Coliseum; Indianapolis, IN
February 13, 2021; 11:00 am, ESPN+		at IUPUI	L 81–88	8–11 (5–9)	21 – Kirk	6 – Tied	5 – Kirk	Indiana Farmers Coliseum; Indianapolis, IN
February 19, 2021; 7:00 pm, ESPN3		Green Bay	W 61–58	9–11 (6–9)	19 – Kirk	13 – Diggins	6 – Kirk	Credit Union 1 Arena; Chicago, IL
February 20, 2021; 7:00 pm, ESPN3		Green Bay	L 59–69	9–12 (6–10)	11 – Kirk	9 – Wiley	6 – Commander	Credit Union 1 Arena; Chicago, IL
Horizon League tournament
February 25, 2021; 7:00 pm, ESPN+	(11)	at (6) Youngstown State; First Round	L 58–74	9–13	13 – Kirk	7 – Kirk	4 – Kirk	Beeghly Center; Youngstown, OH
*Non-conference game. ^{#}Rankings from AP Poll. (#) Tournament seedings in parentheses. All times are in Central Time Zone.
