= Darrin Horn =

American college basketball coach (born 1972)

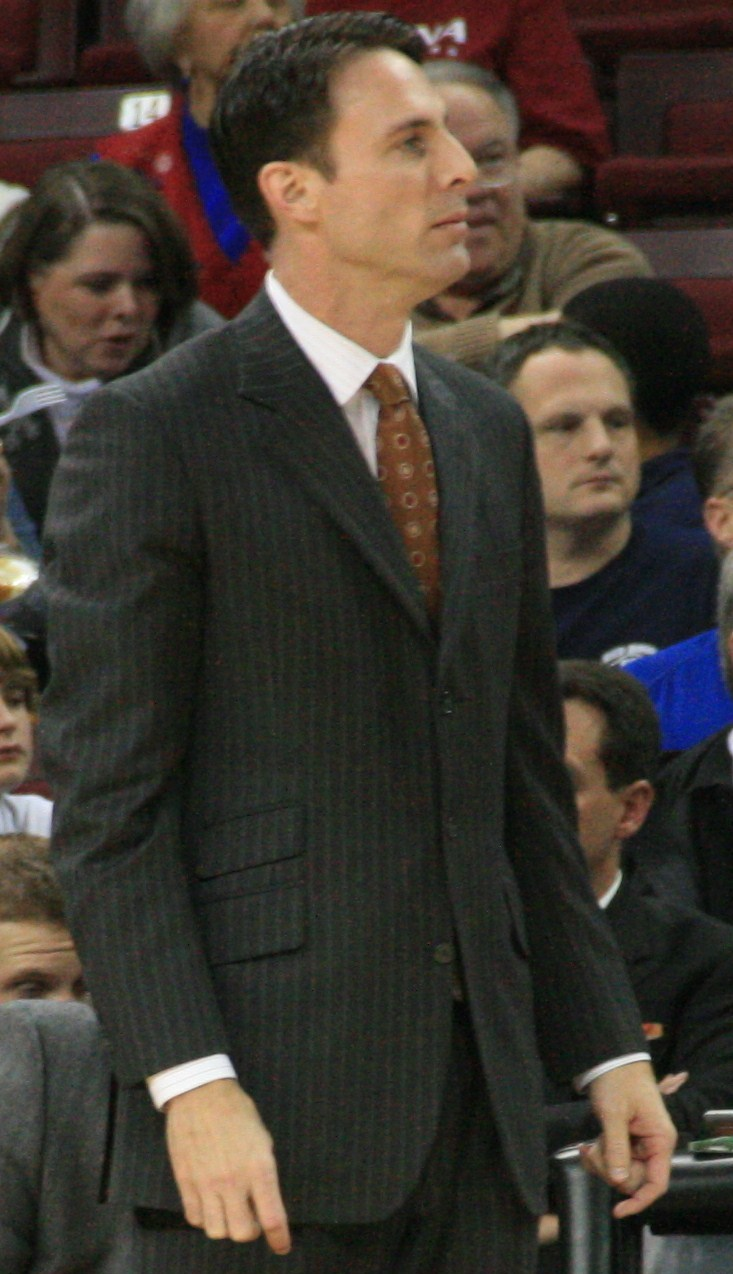

Current position
- Title: Head coach
- Team: Northern Kentucky
- Conference: Horizon League
- Record: 136–90 (.602)

Biographical details
- Born: December 24, 1972 (age 53); Glasgow, Kentucky, U.S.

Playing career
- 1991–1995: Western Kentucky
- Position: Guard

Coaching career (HC unless noted)
- 1995–1997: Western Kentucky (assistant)
- 1997–1999: Morehead State (assistant)
- 1999–2003: Marquette (assistant)
- 2003–2008: Western Kentucky
- 2008–2012: South Carolina
- 2015–2019: Texas (assistant)
- 2019–present: Northern Kentucky

Head coaching record
- Overall: 307–201 (.604)
- Tournaments: 2–2 (NCAA Division I); 1–3 (NIT)

Accomplishments and honors

Championships
- 2 Sun Belt regular season (2006, 2008); Sun Belt tournament (2008); 2 Horizon League tournament (2020, 2023)

Darrin McKinley Horn (born December 24, 1972) is an American college basketball head coach at Northern Kentucky, having previously served as an assistant coach at the University of Texas and a head coach for the Division I (NCAA) programs at Western Kentucky University and at the University of South Carolina.

== Playing career ==
Born in Kentucky, Horn played guard for the 1991 KHSAA state runner-up Tates Creek High School Commodores in Lexington, Kentucky for coach Nolan Barger.

In college, Horn played for Western Kentucky University Hilltoppers in Bowling Green, Kentucky from 1991 to 1995. He was a crowd favorite, hitting a game-winning three-pointer to defeat the University of Louisville on February 16, 1993, in Freedom Hall. While Horn played at WKU, the team made it to the NCAA tournament three times, defeating Memphis State (led by Penny Hardaway) and Seton Hall in 1993 before losing to Florida State University; losing to the University of Texas in the first round in 1994; and defeating the University of Michigan before losing to the University of Kansas (led by Greg Ostertag) in 1995. Horn played for Ralph Willard and Matt Kilcullen while at WKU.

== Coaching career ==
=== Assistant coach ===
Horn served as an assistant coach from 1995 to 1997 at WKU for then-coach Matt Kilcullen before departing for Morehead State University to serve under Kyle Macy for two seasons before departing for Marquette.

He was an assistant coach at Marquette University under Tom Crean. That Marquette team was led by future NBA players Dwyane Wade and Travis Diener. Crean and Horn first crossed paths when Horn played at WKU and Crean was an assistant for the Hilltoppers under head coach Ralph Willard.

=== Head coach ===
After his tenure at Marquette, Horn was hired as the head coach at Western Kentucky University to replace Dennis Felton, who left for the University of Georgia after three trips to the NCAA Tournament. Prior to his hiring, Travis Diener recommended Horn to the then-WKU athletic director Wood Selig.

Horn compiled a record of 111–48 in five seasons at his alma mater, WKU. He led the Hilltoppers to the Sweet 16, the third round of the 2008 NCAA men's basketball tournament, a tournament run that included one of the most celebrated buzzer beaters in college basketball history, a three-pointer by Ty Rogers against Drake in overtime. Their run ended with a 10-point loss to top-seeded UCLA.

On April 1, 2008, Horn was hired as the new men's coach at the University of South Carolina, replacing Dave Odom.

On March 13, 2012, he was fired as head coach of the Gamecocks after going 60–63 in 4 seasons with only one postseason appearance.

On April 23, 2019, Horn was hired as head coach by Northern Kentucky University replacing John Brannen who left to take the University of Cincinnati job.

== Coaching style ==
Horn's teams are known for their up-tempo style of play, full-court trapping defense and conditioning. While at WKU, Horn's teams averaged 47% field goal accuracy and averaged approximately 77 points per game.

== Personal life ==
Horn is married to Carla Walker Horn of Dickson, Tennessee. The couple have two children, Caroline and Walker. Walker plays college basketball for the University of Kentucky.

== Head coaching record ==
Record table
Season	Team	Overall	Conference	Standing	Postseason
Western Kentucky Hilltoppers (Sun Belt Conference) (2003–2008)
2003–04	Western Kentucky	15–13	8–6	5th	
2004–05	Western Kentucky	22–9	9–5	2nd (East)	NIT First Round
2005–06	Western Kentucky	23–8	12–2	1st (East)	NIT First Round
2006–07	Western Kentucky	22–11	12–6	2nd (East)	
2007–08	Western Kentucky	29–7	16–2	T–1st (East)	NCAA Division I Sweet 16
Western Kentucky:		111–48 (.698)	57–21 (.731)		
South Carolina Gamecocks (Southeastern Conference) (2008–2012)
2008–09	South Carolina	21–10	10–6	T–1st (East)	NIT First Round
2009–10	South Carolina	15–16	6–10	5th (East)	
2010–11	South Carolina	14–16	5–11	6th (East)	
2011–12	South Carolina	10–21	2–14	12th	
South Carolina:		60–63 (.488)	23–41 (.359)		
Northern Kentucky Norse (Horizon League) (2019–present)
2019–20	Northern Kentucky	23–9	13–5	2nd	NCAA Division I Canceled
2020–21	Northern Kentucky	14–11	11–7	4th	
2021–22	Northern Kentucky	20–12	14–6	3rd	
2022–23	Northern Kentucky	22–13	14–6	T–2nd	NCAA Division I Round of 64
2023–24	Northern Kentucky	18–15	12–8	T–5th	
2024–25	Northern Kentucky	17–16	11–9	T–6th	
2025–26	Northern Kentucky	20–14	10–10	7th	
2026–27	Northern Kentucky	2–0	0–0		
Northern Kentucky:		136–90 (.602)	85–51 (.625)		
Total:		307–201 (.604)			
National champion Postseason invitational champion Conference regular season champion Conference regular season and conference tournament champion Division regular season champion Division regular season and conference tournament champion Conference tournament champion
