= 2020–21 Milwaukee Panthers men's basketball team =

American college basketball season

2020–21 Milwaukee Panthers men's basketball
- Conference: Horizon League
- Record: 10–12 (7–10 Horizon)
- Head coach: Patrick Baldwin (4th season)
- Assistant coaches: Paris Parham; Terrance McGee; John Bowler
- Home arena: Klotsche Center

2020–21 Horizon League men's basketball standings
| | Conf. | | | | Overall |
| Team | W | | L | PCT | W | | L | PCT |
|---|---|---|---|---|---|---|---|---|
| Wright State | 16 | – | 4 | .800 | 18 | – | 6 | .750 |
| Cleveland State † | 16 | – | 4 | .800 | 19 | – | 8 | .704 |
| Detroit Mercy | 10 | – | 6 | .625 | 12 | – | 10 | .545 |
| Northern Kentucky | 11 | – | 7 | .611 | 14 | – | 11 | .560 |
| Oakland | 10 | – | 10 | .500 | 12 | – | 18 | .400 |
| Youngstown State | 9 | – | 11 | .450 | 15 | – | 12 | .556 |
| IUPUI | 7 | – | 9 | .438 | 8 | – | 10 | .444 |
| Milwaukee | 7 | – | 10 | .412 | 10 | – | 12 | .455 |
| Green Bay | 8 | – | 12 | .400 | 8 | – | 17 | .320 |
| UIC | 6 | – | 10 | .375 | 9 | – | 13 | .409 |
| Purdue Fort Wayne | 6 | – | 14 | .300 | 8 | – | 15 | .348 |
| Robert Morris | 3 | – | 12 | .200 | 4 | – | 15 | .211 |
† 2021 Horizon League tournament winner

The 2020–21 Milwaukee Panthers men's basketball team represented the University of Wisconsin–Milwaukee during the 2020–21 NCAA Division I men's basketball season. The Panthers, led by fourth-year head coach Pat Baldwin, played their home games at the Klotsche Center in Milwaukee, Wisconsin as members of the Horizon League.

In a season limited due to the ongoing COVID-19 pandemic, the Panthers finished the season 10–12, 7–10 in Horizon League play, to finish in eighth place. They lost in the semifinals of the Horizon League tournament to Cleveland State.

== Previous season ==
The Panthers finished the 2019–20 season 12–19, 7–11 in Horizon League play, to finish in a tie for seventh place. They lost in the first round of the Horizon League tournament to Youngstown State.

== Roster ==
2020–21 Milwaukee Panthers men's basketball team
Players
Coaches

| Pos. | # | Name | Height | Weight | Year | Hometown |
|---|---|---|---|---|---|---|
| G | 0 | Donovan Newby | 6 ft 1 in (1.85 m) | 190 lb (86 kg) | Fr | Chicago Heights, IL |
| G | 1 | Devon Hancock | 6 ft 3 in (1.91 m) | 190 lb (86 kg) | Fr | Dallas, TX |
| G | 2 | Jordan Lathon | 6 ft 4 in (1.93 m) | 200 lb (91 kg) | RS Fr | Grandview, MO |
| G | 3 | Te'Jon Lucas | 6 ft 2 in (1.88 m) | 180 lb (82 kg) | RS Sr | Milwaukee, WI |
| G | 4 | Deandre Gholston | 6 ft 5 in (1.96 m) | 215 lb (98 kg) | RS Jr | Gary, IN |
| G | 5 | C.J. Wilbourn | 6 ft 7 in (2.01 m) | 233 lb (106 kg) | So | Bloomington, IL |
| G | 10 | Kaliem Taylor | 6 ft 3 in (1.91 m) | 225 lb (102 kg) | Fr | Milwaukee, WI |
| G/F | 11 | Vin Baker Jr. | 6 ft 9 in (2.06 m) | 190 lb (86 kg) | RS Jr | Old Saybrook, CT |
| F/C | 12 | Amir Allen | 6 ft 8 in (2.03 m) | 225 lb (102 kg) | Sr | Randolph, NJ |
| G/F | 13 | Courtney Brown Jr. | 6 ft 7 in (2.01 m) | 205 lb (93 kg) | Sr | Cottage Grove, MN |
| G | 14 | Tyler Ellingson | 6 ft 5 in (1.96 m) | 180 lb (82 kg) | RS Fr | Menomonee Falls, WI |
| F | 21 | Tafari Simms | 6 ft 7 in (2.01 m) | 212 lb (96 kg) | Jr | Hamilton, ON |
| G | 22 | Nick Pappas | 6 ft 3 in (1.91 m) | 180 lb (82 kg) | Fr | Phoenix, AZ |
| G | 24 | Josh Thomas | 6 ft 4 in (1.93 m) | 205 lb (93 kg) | RS Sr | Chicago, IL |
| C | 44 | Joey St. Pierre | 6 ft 10 in (2.08 m) | 275 lb (125 kg) | RS Jr | Spring Grove, IL |

Head coach

- Patrick Baldwin (Northwestern)

Assistant coach(es)

- Paris Parham (Minnesota State)
- Terrance McGee (Missouri State)
- John Bowler (Eastern Michigan)

Legend

- (C) Team captain
- (S) Suspended
- (I) Ineligible
- (W) Walk-on
- Injured
- Current redshirt

Roster
Last update: March 30, 2021

== Schedule and results ==
| Date time, TV | Rank^{#} | Opponent^{#} | Result | Record | Site (attendance) city, state |
Non-conference regular season
| December 11, 2020*; 7:00 p.m., ESPN+ | | at Kansas State | L 75–76 | 0–1 | Bramlage Coliseum (577); Manhattan, KS |
| December 13, 2020*; 1:00 p.m., ESPN3 | | at Western Michigan | W 71–63 | 1–1 | University Arena; Kalamazoo, MI |
Conference regular season
| December 19, 2020; 1:00 p.m., ESPN3 | | at Green Bay | W 68–65 | 2–1 (1–0) | Kress Events Center; Green Bay, WI |
| December 20, 2020; 1:00 p.m., ESPN3 | | at Green Bay | W 74–62 | 3–1 (2–0) | Kress Events Center; Green Bay, WI |
| December 26, 2020; Canceled, ESPN+ | | UIC | Postponed due to COVID-19 | | Klotsche Center; Milwaukee, WI |
| December 27, 2020; Canceled, ESPN+ | | UIC | Postponed due to COVID-19 | | Klotsche Center; Milwaukee, WI |
| January 1, 2021; 12:00 p.m., ESPN3 | | at Robert Morris | L 64–67 | 3–2 (2–1) | UPMC Events Center; Moon Township, PA |
| January 2, 2021; 11:00 a.m., ESPN3 | | at Robert Morris | Postponed due to COVID-19 | | UPMC Events Center; Moon Township, PA |
| January 8, 2021; 11:00 a.m., ESPN3 | | IUPUI | W 94-70 | 4–2 (3–1) | Klotsche Center; Milwaukee, WI |
| January 9, 2021; 11:00 a.m., ESPN3 | | IUPUI | W 71-63 | 5–2 (4–1) | Klotsche Center; Milwaukee, WI |
| January 15, 2021; 6:00 p.m., ESPN+ | | Purdue Fort Wayne | L 72–81 | 5–3 (4–2) | Klotsche Center; Milwaukee, WI |
| January 16, 2021; 6:00 p.m., ESPN+ | | Purdue Fort Wayne | L 74–81 | 5–4 (4–3) | Klotsche Center; Milwaukee, WI |
| January 22, 2021; 8:00 p.m., ESPN2 | | at Cleveland State | L 53–64 | 5–5 (4–4) | Wolstein Center; Cleveland, OH |
| January 23, 2021; 4:00 p.m., ESPN3 | | at Cleveland State | W 81–80 ^{OT} | 6–5 (5–4) | Wolstein Center; Cleveland, OH |
| January 29, 2021; 5:00 p.m., ESPN3 | | at IUPUI | L 68–73 | 6–6 (5–5) | Indiana Farmers Coliseum; Indianapolis, IN |
| January 30, 2021; 2:00 p.m., ESPN3 | | at IUPUI | W 83–76 | 7–6 (6–5) | Indiana Farmers Coliseum; Indianapolis, IN |
| February 5, 2021; 5:00 p.m., ESPN3 | | Northern Kentucky | L 73–87 | 7–7 (6–6) | Klotsche Center; Milwaukee, WI |
| February 6, 2021; 2:00 p.m., ESPN3 | | Northern Kentucky | L 65–79 | 7–8 (6–7) | Klotsche Center; Milwaukee, WI |
| February 12, 2021; 6:00 p.m., ESPN3 | | at Wright State | L 81–92 | 7–9 (6–8) | Nutter Center; Fairborn, OH |
| February 13, 2021; 2:00 p.m., ESPN3 | | at Wright State | L 82–92 | 7–10 (6–9) | Nutter Center; Fairborn, OH |
| February 19, 2021; 6:00 p.m., ESPN3 | | Oakland | L 81–85 | 7–11 (6–10) | Klotsche Center; Milwaukee, WI |
| February 20, 2021; 5:00 p.m., ESPN3 | | Oakland | W 89–87 ^{2OT} | 8–11 (7–10) | Klotsche Center; Milwaukee, WI |
Horizon League tournament
| February 25, 2021; 7:00 p.m., ESPN+ | (8) | (9) IUPUI; First round | W 84–72 | 9–11 | Klotsche Center; Milwaukee, WI |
| March 2, 2021; 6:00 p.m., ESPN+ | (8) | at (2) Wright State; Quarterfinals | W 94–92 | 10–11 | Nutter Center; Fairborn, OH |
| March 8, 2021; 6:30 p.m., ESPNU | (8) | vs. (1) Cleveland State; Semifinals | L 65–71 | 10–12 | Indiana Farmers Coliseum; Indianapolis, IN |
*Non-conference game. ^{#}Rankings from AP poll. (#) Tournament seedings in parentheses. All times are in Central.
