= 2020–21 Robert Morris Colonials men's basketball team =

American college basketball season

2020–21 Robert Morris Colonials men's basketball
- Conference: Horizon League
- Record: 4–15 (3–12 Horizon)
- Head coach: Andrew Toole (11th season)
- Assistant coaches: Mike Iuzzolino; Vince Johnson; Dave Fedor
- Home arena: UPMC Events Center

2020–21 Horizon League men's basketball standings
	Conf.				Overall
Team	W		L	PCT	W		L	PCT
Wright State	16	–	4	.800	18	–	6	.750
Cleveland State †	16	–	4	.800	19	–	8	.704
Detroit Mercy	10	–	6	.625	12	–	10	.545
Northern Kentucky	11	–	7	.611	14	–	11	.560
Oakland	10	–	10	.500	12	–	18	.400
Youngstown State	9	–	11	.450	15	–	12	.556
IUPUI	7	–	9	.438	8	–	10	.444
Milwaukee	7	–	10	.412	10	–	12	.455
Green Bay	8	–	12	.400	8	–	17	.320
UIC	6	–	10	.375	9	–	13	.409
Purdue Fort Wayne	6	–	14	.300	8	–	15	.348
Robert Morris	3	–	12	.200	4	–	15	.211
† 2021 Horizon League tournament winner

The 2020–21 Robert Morris Colonials men's basketball team represented Robert Morris University during the 2020–21 NCAA Division I men's basketball season. The Colonials, led by 11th-year head coach Andrew Toole, played their home games at the UPMC Events Center in Moon Township, Pennsylvania as first-year members of the Horizon League.

== Previous season ==
The Colonials finished the 2019–20 season 20–14, 13–5 in NEC play to finish in a tie for second place. They defeated St. Francis Brooklyn, LIU and Saint Francis (PA) to be champions of the NEC tournament. They earned the NEC's automatic bid to the NCAA tournament. However, the NCAA Tournament was cancelled amid the COVID-19 pandemic.

It was the last season for the Colonials in the NEC.

== Roster ==
2020–21 Robert Morris Colonials men's basketball team
Players
Coaches

Pos.	#	Name	Height	Weight	Year	Previous school	Hometown
G	0	Kam Farris	6 ft 3 in (1.91 m)	165 lb (75 kg)	Fr	Rice Memorial HS	Burlington, VT
G	1	Jon Williams	6 ft 1 in (1.85 m)	175 lb (79 kg)	Sr	St. Vincent–St. Mary HS	Akron, OH
F	2	Kahliel Spear	6 ft 7 in (2.01 m)	220 lb (100 kg)	Jr	The Colony HS	The Colony, TX
G	3	Dante Treacy	6 ft 0 in (1.83 m)	170 lb (77 kg)	Jr	Central Florida Christian Academy	Orlando, FL
G	4	Chase Cook	5 ft 10 in (1.78 m)	170 lb (77 kg)	Fr	Coolidge HS	Washington, D.C.
G/F	5	AJ Bramah	6 ft 7 in (2.01 m)	210 lb (95 kg)	Jr	San Leandro HS	San Leandro, CA
G	11	Enoch Cheeks	6 ft 3 in (1.91 m)	190 lb (86 kg)	Fr	Putnam Science Academy	Providence, RI
G	12	Trayden Williams	5 ft 11 in (1.8 m)	165 lb (75 kg)	Fr	North Mecklenburg HS	Charlotte, NC
G	13	Terrell Brown	6 ft 2 in (1.88 m)	185 lb (84 kg)	So	Proctor Academy	Lowell, MA
F	20	Charles Bain	6 ft 8 in (2.03 m)	220 lb (100 kg)	Sr	St. John's Northwestern Military Academy	Freeport, Bahamas
G	22	Cameron Wilbon	6 ft 5 in (1.96 m)	200 lb (91 kg)	Jr	Merrillville HS	Merrillville, IN
F	23	Olisa Ngonadi	6 ft 8 in (2.03 m)	185 lb (84 kg)	So	National Christian Academy	Fort Washington, MD
F	24	Pat Suemnick	6 ft 8 in (2.03 m)	230 lb (104 kg)	Fr	Denmark HS	Green Bay, WI
G	30	Jakari Spence	6 ft 0 in (1.83 m)	170 lb (77 kg)	Fr	Toms River North HS	Toms River, NJ

Head coach

- Andrew Toole (Pennsylvania)

Assistant coach(es)

- Mike Iuzzolino (Saint Francis (PA))
- Vince Johnson (St. Thomas Aquinas)
- Dave Fedor (Rutgers)

Legend

- (C) Team captain
- (S) Suspended
- (I) Ineligible
- (W) Walk-on
- Injured
- Current redshirt

Roster
Last update: December 24, 2020

== Schedule and results ==
Date time, TV	Rank^{#}	Opponent^{#}	Result	Record	Site (attendance) city, state
Non-conference regular season
December 5, 2020*; 6:00 pm, ESPN3		Point Park	W 75–57	1–0	UPMC Events Center; Moon Township, PA
December 18, 2020*; 6:00 pm, ESPN3		Bowling Green	L 65–85	1–1	UPMC Events Center; Moon Township, PA
December 20, 2020*; 2:00 pm		Marshall	L 71–85	1–2	Cam Henderson Center (1,230); Huntington, WV
December 26, 2020; 7:00 pm, ESPN+		at Purdue Fort Wayne	W 102–88	2–2 (1–0)	Hilliard Gates Sports Center; Fort Wayne, IN
December 27, 2020; 5:00 pm, ESPN+		at Purdue Fort Wayne	L 82–87	2–3 (1–1)	Hilliard Gates Sports Center; Fort Wayne, IN
January 1, 2021; 1:00 pm, ESPN3		Milwaukee	W 67–64	3–3 (2–1)	UPMC Events Center; Moon Township, PA
January 2, 2021; 12:00 pm, ESPN3		Milwaukee	Postponed due to COVID-19 issues		UPMC Events Center; Moon Township, PA
January 8, 2021; 12:00 pm, ESPN3		at IUPUI	Postponed due to COVID-19 issues		Indiana Farmers Coliseum; Indianapolis, IN
January 9, 2021; 12:00 pm, ESPN3		at IUPUI	Postponed due to COVID-19 issues		Indiana Farmers Coliseum; Indianapolis, IN
January 15, 2021; 8:00 pm, ESPN3		at UIC	L 53–67	3–4 (2–2)	Credit Union 1 Arena; Chicago, IL
January 16, 2021; 6:00 pm, ESPN3		at UIC	L 62–66 ^{OT}	3–5 (2–3)	Credit Union 1 Arena; Chicago, IL
January 22, 2021; 7:00 pm, ESPN3		Northern Kentucky	L 76–81	3–6 (2–4)	UPMC Events Center; Moon Township, PA
January 23, 2020; 5:00 pm, ESPN3		Northern Kentucky	L 74–79 ^{OT}	3–7 (2–5)	UPMC Events Center; Moon Township, PA
January 29, 2021; 9:00 pm, ESPNU		at Wright State	L 70–79	3–8 (2–6)	Nutter Center; Fairborn, OH
January 30, 2021; 7:00 pm, ESPN+		at Wright State	L 56–86	3–9 (2–7)	Nutter Center; Fairborn, OH
February 5, 2021; 7:00 pm, ESPN+		Youngstown State	L 78-84	3-10 (2-8)	UPMC Events Center; Moon Township, PA
February 6, 2021; 5:00 pm, ESPN+		Youngstown State	L 66-70	3-11 (2-9)	UPMC Events Center; Moon Township, PA
February 12, 2021; 7:00 pm, ESPN3		Oakland	W 88–82	4–11 (3–9)	UPMC Events Center; Moon Township, PA
February 13, 2021; 5:00 pm, ESPN3		Oakland	L 81–86	4–12 (3–10)	UPMC Events Center; Moon Township, PA
February 19, 2021; 7:00 pm, ESPN3		at Detroit Mercy	L 74–85	4–13 (3–11)	Calihan Hall; Detroit, MI
February 20, 2021; 7:00 pm, ESPN3		at Detroit Mercy	L 61–80	4–14 (3–12)	Calihan Hall; Detroit, MI
Horizon League tournament
February 25, 2021; 7:00 pm, ESPN+	(12)	at (5) Detroit Mercy; First Round	L 73–83	4–15	Calihan Hall; Detroit, MI
*Non-conference game. ^{#}Rankings from AP Poll. (#) Tournament seedings in parentheses. All times are in Eastern.
