= 2020–21 Youngstown State Penguins men's basketball team =

American college basketball season

2020–21 Youngstown State Penguins men's basketball
- Conference: Horizon League
- Record: 15–12 (9–11 Horizon)
- Head coach: Jerrod Calhoun (4th season)
- Associate head coach: Jason Slay
- Assistant coaches: Ethan Faulkner; Chinedu Nwachukwu
- Home arena: Beeghly Center

2020–21 Horizon League men's basketball standings
	Conf.				Overall
Team	W		L	PCT	W		L	PCT
Wright State	16	–	4	.800	18	–	6	.750
Cleveland State †	16	–	4	.800	19	–	8	.704
Detroit Mercy	10	–	6	.625	12	–	10	.545
Northern Kentucky	11	–	7	.611	14	–	11	.560
Oakland	10	–	10	.500	12	–	18	.400
Youngstown State	9	–	11	.450	15	–	12	.556
IUPUI	7	–	9	.438	8	–	10	.444
Milwaukee	7	–	10	.412	10	–	12	.455
Green Bay	8	–	12	.400	8	–	17	.320
UIC	6	–	10	.375	9	–	13	.409
Purdue Fort Wayne	6	–	14	.300	8	–	15	.348
Robert Morris	3	–	12	.200	4	–	15	.211
† 2021 Horizon League tournament winner

The 2020–21 Youngstown State Penguins men's basketball team represented Youngstown State University in the 2020–21 NCAA Division I men's basketball season. The Penguins, led by fourth-year head coach Jerrod Calhoun, played their home games at the Beeghly Center in Youngstown, Ohio as members of the Horizon League.

== Previous season ==
The Penguins finished the 2019–20 season 18–15, 10–8 in Horizon League play to finish in a tie for fourth place. They defeated Milwaukee in the first round of the Horizon League tournament before losing in the quarterfinals to UIC. They accepted and invitation to the CollegeIndsider.com Tournament. However, the CIT, and all other postseason tournaments, were cancelled amid the COVID-19 pandemic.

== Roster ==
2020–21 Youngstown State Penguins men's basketball team
Players
Coaches

Pos.	#	Name	Height	Weight	Year	Hometown
G	0	Greyson Kelley	6 ft 2 in (1.88 m)	195 lb (88 kg)	Sr	Raleigh, North Carolina
F	1	Jamir Thomas	6 ft 8 in (2.03 m)	275 lb (125 kg)	Sr	Passaic, New Jersey
G	2	Carson Ryan	6 ft 4 in (1.93 m)	200 lb (91 kg)	Sr	Struthers, Ohio
G	3	Darius Quisenberry	6 ft 1 in (1.85 m)	188 lb (85 kg)	Jr	Springfield, Ohio
G	4	Kenny Ganley, Jr.	6 ft 4 in (1.93 m)	195 lb (88 kg)	RS Fr	Brecksville, Ohio
G	5	Christian Bentley	6 ft 3 in (1.91 m)	207 lb (94 kg)	Sr	Brampton, Ontario, Canada
G	11	Daniel Ogoro	6 ft 5 in (1.96 m)	205 lb (93 kg)	RS Fr	London, England
G	14	Alex Vargo	6 ft 5 in (1.96 m)	200 lb (91 kg)	Fr	Wheeling, West Virginia
G	15	Myles Hunter	6 ft 5 in (1.96 m)	180 lb (82 kg)	Fr	Charlotte, North Carolina
G	20	Geoff Hamperian	6 ft 4 in (1.93 m)	205 lb (93 kg)	Jr	Morgantown, West Virginia
G	22	Shemar Rathan-Mayes	5 ft 11 in (1.8 m)	165 lb (75 kg)	Fr	Toronto, Ontario, Canada
F	24	Cheick Traore	6 ft 8 in (2.03 m)	220 lb (100 kg)	Fr	Concord, North Carolina
F	25	Williiam Dunn	6 ft 8 in (2.03 m)	211 lb (96 kg)	Fr	Quincy, Michigan
F	31	Michael Akuchie	6 ft 8 in (2.03 m)	205 lb (93 kg)	Sr	Plantation, Florida
G	32	Garrett Covington	6 ft 5 in (1.96 m)	200 lb (91 kg)	Sr	Carmel, Indiana
F	33	Naz Bohannon	6 ft 6 in (1.98 m)	228 lb (103 kg)	Sr	Lorain, Ohio

Head coach

- Jerrod Calhoun (Cincinnati)

Assistant coach(es)

- Jason Slay (West Virginia State)
- Ethan Faulkner (Northern Kentucky)
- Chinedu Nwachukwu (Michigan)

Legend

- (C) Team captain
- (S) Suspended
- (I) Ineligible
- (W) Walk-on
- Injured
- Current redshirt

Roster
Last update: December 18, 2020

== Schedule and results ==
Date time, TV	Rank^{#}	Opponent^{#}	Result	Record	Site (attendance) city, state
Non-conference regular season
December 9, 2020*; 7:00 pm, ESPN3		Point Park	W 72–52	1–0	Beeghly Center (300); Youngstown, OH
December 13, 2020*; 1:00 pm, ESPN3		at Binghamton	W 79–65	2–0	Binghamton University Events Center; Vestal, NY
December 14, 2020*; 8:00 pm		West Virginia Tech	W 80–66	3–0	Beeghly Center (300); Youngstown, OH
Horizon League regular season
December 19, 2020; 2:00 pm, ESPN3		at Northern Kentucky	L 64–79	3–1 (0–1)	BB&T Arena; Highland Heights, KY
December 20, 2020; 3:00 pm, ESPN2		at Northern Kentucky	W 70–60	4–1 (1–1)	BB&T Arena; Highland Heights, KY
December 26, 2020; 1:00 pm, ESPN3		at Cleveland State	L 69–87	4–2 (1–2)	Wolstein Center; Cleveland, OH
December 27, 2020; 1:00 pm, ESPN3		at Cleveland State	L 74–81	4–3 (1–3)	Wolstein Center; Cleveland, OH
January 1, 2021; 4:00 pm, ESPN+		Green Bay	W 84–77	5–3 (2–3)	Beeghly Center; Youngstown, OH
January 2, 2021; 4:00 pm, ESPN3		Green Bay	L 69–79	5–4 (2–4)	Beeghly Center; Youngstown, OH
January 4, 2021; 6:00 pm, ESPN3		Carlow	W 109–56	6–4	Beeghly Center (300); Youngstown, OH
January 8, 2021; 7:00 pm, ESPN2		at Wright State	W 74–72	7–4 (3–4)	Nutter Center; Fairborn, OH
January 9, 2021; 3:00 pm, ESPN3		at Wright State	L 55–93	7–5 (3–5)	Nutter Center; Fairborn, OH
January 15, 2021; 7:00 pm, ESPN3		at Oakland	L 65–82	7–6 (3–6)	Athletics Center O'rena; Auburn Hills, MI
January 16, 2021; 3:00 pm, ESPN3		at Oakland	L 74–81	7–7 (3–7)	Athletics Center O'rena; Auburn Hills, MI
January 22, 2021; 5:00 pm, ESPN3		UIC	L 66–67	7–8 (3–8)	Beeghly Center; Youngstown, OH
January 23, 2021; 5:00 pm, ESPN3		UIC	W 85–77	8–8 (4–8)	Beeghly Center; Youngstown, OH
January 29, 2021; 5:00 pm, ESPN3		Detroit Mercy	L 75–78	8–9 (4–9)	Beeghly Center; Youngstown, OH
January 30, 2021; 5:00 pm, ESPN3		Detroit Mercy	L 72–77	8–10 (4–10)	Beeghly Center; Youngstown, OH
February 5, 2021; 7:00 pm, ESPN+		at Robert Morris	W 84–78 ^{OT}	9–10 (5–10)	UPMC Events Center; Moon Township, PA
February 6, 2021; 5:00 pm, ESPN+		at Robert Morris	W 70–66 ^{OT}	10–10 (6–10)	UPMC Events Center; Moon Township, PA
February 8, 2021*; 1:00 pm, ESPN+		Rochester Christian University	W 60–50	11–10	Beeghly Center (300); Youngstown, OH
February 12, 2021; 5:00 pm, ESPN+		Purdue Fort Wayne	W 84–70	12–10 (7–10)	Beeghly Center; Youngstown, OH
February 13, 2021; 5:00 pm, ESPN+		Purdue Fort Wayne	W 72–70	13–10 (8–10)	Beeghly Center; Youngstown, OH
February 19, 2021; 5:00 pm, ESPN3		IUPUI	L 70–72	13–11 (8–11)	Beeghly Center; Youngstown, OH
February 20, 2021; 5:00 pm, ESPN3		IUPUI	W 77–70	14–11 (9–11)	Beeghly Center; Youngstown, OH
Horizon League tournament
February 25, 2021; 7:00 pm, ESPN+	(6)	(11) UIC; First Round	W 74–58	15–11	Beeghly Center; Youngstown, OH
March 2, 2021; 7:00 pm, ESPN+	(6)	at (3) Oakland; Quarterfinals	L 83–87 ^{OT}	15–12	Athletics Center O'rena; Auburn Hills, MI
*Non-conference game. ^{#}Rankings from AP Poll. (#) Tournament seedings in parentheses. All times are in Eastern.
