= 2020–21 Purdue Fort Wayne Mastodons men's basketball team =

American college basketball season

2020–21 Purdue Fort Wayne Mastodons men's basketball
- Conference: Horizon League
- Record: 8–15 (6–14 Horizon)
- Head coach: Jon Coffman (7th season)
- Assistant coaches: Ryan Sims (11th season); Adam Blaylock (3rd season); Mike Wolf (2nd season)
- Home arena: Hilliard Gates Sports Center

2020–21 Horizon League men's basketball standings
	Conf.				Overall
Team	W		L	PCT	W		L	PCT
Wright State	16	–	4	.800	18	–	6	.750
Cleveland State †	16	–	4	.800	19	–	8	.704
Detroit Mercy	10	–	6	.625	12	–	10	.545
Northern Kentucky	11	–	7	.611	14	–	11	.560
Oakland	10	–	10	.500	12	–	18	.400
Youngstown State	9	–	11	.450	15	–	12	.556
IUPUI	7	–	9	.438	8	–	10	.444
Milwaukee	7	–	10	.412	10	–	12	.455
Green Bay	8	–	12	.400	8	–	17	.320
UIC	6	–	10	.375	9	–	13	.409
Purdue Fort Wayne	6	–	14	.300	8	–	15	.348
Robert Morris	3	–	12	.200	4	–	15	.211
† 2021 Horizon League tournament winner

The 2020–21 Purdue Fort Wayne Mastodons men's basketball team represented Purdue University Fort Wayne in the 2020–21 NCAA Division I men's basketball season. The Mastodons, led by seventh-year head coach Jon Coffman, played their home games at the Hilliard Gates Sports Center in Fort Wayne, Indiana, as members of the Horizon League.

This was the Mastodons' first season in the Horizon League; the school left the Summit League after the 2019–20 season.

== Previous season ==
The Mastodons finished the 2019–20 season 14–19 overall, 6–10 in Summit League play, to finish in 7th place. In the Summit League tournament, they defeated South Dakota State in the quarterfinals, before falling to North Dakota in the semifinals.

== Offseason ==
=== Departures ===
Name	Number	Pos.	Height	Weight	Year	Hometown	Reason for departure
Chase Johnston	0	G	6'2"	180	Freshman	Boca Raton, FL	Transferred to Stetson
Brian Patrick	2	G	6'5"	200	Junior	Fort Lauderdale, FL	Transferred to DePaul
Jalin Wimberly	4	G	6'4"	180	Junior	Leesburg, GA	Transferred to Reinhardt
Tionne Rollins	5	G	6'2"	180	Freshman	Tallahassee, FL	Transferred to Polk State
Matt Holba	13	F	6'7"	225	RS Senior	Noblesville, IN	Graduated
Josh Inkumsah	31	F	6'7"	265	RS Freshman	Barrie, ON	Transferred to Ottawa
Rylen Grundy	35	F	6'5"	200	Sophomore	South Bend, IN	Did not return to program
Marcus DeBerry	41	G	6'5"	195	RS Senior	Union City, TN	Graduated

=== Incoming transfers ===
Name	Number	Pos.	Height	Weight	Year	Hometown	Previous School
Bobby Planutis	0	F	6'8"	200	RS Junior	Hazleton, PA	St. Bonaventure
Bryce Waterman	22	G	6'6"	205	Sophomore	Colonie, NY	Pensacola State
Demetric Horton	25	G	6'5"	200	Junior	Raleigh, NC	Independence CC
Jalon Pipkins	50	G	6'4"	185	Senior	Paris, TX	Loyola–Chicago

== Roster ==
2020–21 Purdue Fort Wayne Mastodons men's basketball team
Players
Coaches

Pos.	#	Name	Height	Weight	Year	Hometown
F	0	Bobby Planutis	6 ft 8 in (2.03 m)	200 lb (91 kg)	RS Jr	Hazleton, Pennsylvania
G	1	Jarred Godfrey	6 ft 5 in (1.96 m)	185 lb (84 kg)	Jr	Atlanta, Georgia
G	2	Justice Prentice	6 ft 1 in (1.85 m)	175 lb (79 kg)	Fr	Toronto, Ontario
F	3	Ra Kpedi	6 ft 9 in (2.06 m)	225 lb (102 kg)	RS Jr	Indianapolis, Indiana
G	4	Jarvis Walker	6 ft 2 in (1.88 m)	180 lb (82 kg)	Fr	Muskegon, Michigan
F	5	Johnathan Dejurnett	6 ft 8 in (2.03 m)	205 lb (93 kg)	Fr	Memphis, Tennessee
G	10	Matt Havey	6 ft 1 in (1.85 m)	185 lb (84 kg)	RS So	Lansing, Michigan
F	11	Dylan Carl	6 ft 11 in (2.11 m)	240 lb (109 kg)	RS Sr	Alma, Michigan
G	15	Deonte Billups	6 ft 4 in (1.93 m)	185 lb (84 kg)	So	Moline, Illinois
G	22	Bryce Waterman	6 ft 6 in (1.98 m)	205 lb (93 kg)	So	Colonie, New York
G	24	DeMierre Black	6 ft 0 in (1.83 m)	185 lb (84 kg)	Sr	Marietta, Georgia
G	25	Demetric Horton	6 ft 5 in (1.96 m)	200 lb (91 kg)	Jr	Raleigh, North Carolina
F	34	Cameron Benford	6 ft 8 in (2.03 m)	240 lb (109 kg)	Sr	Seattle, Washington
G	50	Jalon Pipkins	6 ft 4 in (1.93 m)	185 lb (84 kg)	Sr	Paris, Texas

Head coach

- Jon Coffman (Washington & Lee)

Assistant coach(es)

- Ryan Sims (Indianapolis)
- Mike Wolf (William Peace)
- Adam Blaylock (Peru State)

Legend

- (C) Team captain
- (S) Suspended
- (I) Ineligible
- (W) Walk-on
- Injured
- Current redshirt

Roster
Last update: December 14, 2020

== Schedule and results ==
Date time, TV	Rank^{#}	Opponent^{#}	Result	Record	High points	High rebounds	High assists	Site (attendance) city, state
Regular Season
November 25, 2020*; 7:00 pm, ESPN3		Southeastern Louisiana	W 67–63 ^{OT}	1–0	18 – Pipkins	6 – Billups/Kpedi	4 – Horton	Hilliard Gates Sports Center; Fort Wayne, IN
November 30, 2020*; 5:00 pm		at Kent State	Postponed					MAC Center; Kent, OH
December 3, 2020*; 7:00 pm, ESPN+		Adrian	Cancelled due to COVID-19 issues					Hilliard Gates Sports Center; Fort Wayne, IN
December 3, 2020*; 7:00 pm		Alcorn State	Cancelled due to COVID-19 issues					Hilliard Gates Sports Center; Fort Wayne, IN
December 5, 2020*; 11:00 am, ACC Network		at Notre Dame	Cancelled due to COVID-19 issues					Purcell Pavilion; South Bend, IN
December 8, 2020*; 7:00 pm, ESPN+		at Dayton	Cancelled due to COVID-19 issues					UD Arena; Dayton, OH
December 12, 2020*; 2:00 pm		Defiance	Cancelled due to COVID-19 issues					Hilliard Gates Sports Center; Fort Wayne, IN
December 13, 2020*; 2:00 pm		Defiance	Cancelled due to COVID-19 issues					Hilliard Gates Sports Center; Fort Wayne, IN
December 19, 2020; 7:00 pm, ESPN3		Cleveland State	L 61–63	1–1 (0–1)	21 – Godfrey	8 – Godfrey	3 – Godfrey/Pipkins	Hilliard Gates Sports Center; Fort Wayne, IN
December 20, 2020; 5:00 pm, ESPN3		Cleveland State	L 80–89	1–2 (0–2)	23 – Godfrey	5 – Planutis	4 – Planutis	Hilliard Gates Sports Center; Fort Wayne, IN
December 26, 2020; 7:00 pm, ESPN+		Robert Morris	L 88–102	1–3 (0–3)	22 – Godfrey	5 – Carl	4 – Carl/Pipkins	Hilliard Gates Sports Center; Fort Wayne, IN
December 27, 2020; 5:00 pm, ESPN+		Robert Morris	W 87–82	2–3 (1–3)	27 – Godfrey	10 – Godfrey	8 – Pipkins	Hilliard Gates Sports Center; Fort Wayne, IN
January 1, 2021; 6:00 pm, ESPN3		at Northern Kentucky	L 68–75	2–4 (1–4)	22 – Billups	4 – Planutis	4 – Carl	BB&T Arena; Highland Heights, KY
January 2, 2021; 6:00 pm, ESPN3		at Northern Kentucky	L 68–70	2–5 (1–5)	16 – Pipkins	6 – Godfrey/Carl	3 – 3 Tied	BB&T Arena; Highland Heights, KY
January 8, 2021; 7:00 pm, ESPN3		UIC	W 96–89 ^{OT}	3–5 (2–5)	41 – Godfrey	11 – Billups	4 – Godfrey/Pipkins	Hilliard Gates Sports Center; Fort Wayne, IN
January 9, 2021; 5:00 pm, ESPN3		UIC	W 88–55	4–5 (3–5)	16 – Godfrey	7 – Carl	3 – 3 Tied	Hilliard Gates Sports Center; Fort Wayne, IN
January 15, 2021; 7:00 pm, ESPN+		at Milwaukee	W 81–72	5–5 (4–5)	23 – Godfrey	10 – Godfrey/Billups	7 – Godfrey	Klotsche Center; Milwaukee, WI
January 16, 2021; 7:00 pm, ESPN+		at Milwaukee	W 81–74	6–5 (5–5)	18 – Godfrey	6 – 3 Tied	7 – Godfrey	Klotsche Center; Milwaukee, WI
January 22, 2021; 7:00 pm, ESPN3		at Green Bay	L 59–77	6–6 (5–6)	11 – Pipkins	6 – Godfrey/Horton	2 – Godfrey/Pipkins	Kress Events Center; Green Bay, WI
January 23, 2021; 5:00 pm, ESPN3		at Green Bay	L 72–87	6–7 (5–7)	16 – Pipkins	5 – Carl/Billups	4 – Pipkins	Kress Events Center; Green Bay, WI
January 29, 2021; 7:00 pm, ESPN3		Oakland	L 66–81	6–8 (5–8)	16 – Planutis	9 – Godfrey	4 – Carl	Hilliard Gates Sports Center; Fort Wayne, IN
January 30, 2021; 7:00 pm, ESPN3		Oakland	L 75–82	6–9 (5–9)	21 – Pipkins	7 – Billups	6 – Godfrey	Hilliard Gates Sports Center; Fort Wayne, IN
February 5, 2021; 7:00 pm, ESPN3		at Detroit Mercy	L 72–82	6–10 (5–10)	17 – Pipkins/Horton	9 – Godfrey	4 – Planutis/Walker	Calihan Hall; Detroit, MI
February 6, 2021; 7:00 pm, ESPN3		at Detroit Mercy	L 56–83	6–11 (5–11)	13 – Godfrey/Billups	5 – Godfrey/Planutis	5 – Pipkins	Calihan Hall; Detroit, MI
February 12, 2021; 5:00 pm, ESPN+		at Youngstown State	L 70–84	6–12 (5–12)	24 – Godfrey	5 – 3 Tied	4 – Godfrey	Beeghly Center; Youngstown, OH
February 13, 2021; 5:00 pm, ESPN+		at Youngstown State	L 70–72	6–13 (5–13)	17 – Godfrey	7 – Pipkins	6 – Godfrey	Beeghly Center; Youngstown, OH
February 19, 2021; 7:00 pm, ESPN+		Cleveland State	W 75–68	7–13 (6–13)	19 – Pipkins	7 – Kpedi	3 – Godfrey/Carl	Hilliard Gates Sports Center; Fort Wayne, IN
February 20, 2021; 5:00 pm, ESPN+		Cleveland State	L 55–67	7–14 (6–14)	17 – Pipkins	7 – Planutis	4 – Godfrey	Hilliard Gates Sports Center; Fort Wayne, IN
Horizon League tournament
February 25, 2021; 8:00 pm, ESPN+	(10)	at (7) Green Bay; First Round	W 89–84 ^{2OT}	8–14	21 – Pipkins	7 – Godfrey	5 – Godfrey	Kress Events Center; Green Bay, WI
March 2, 2021; 7:00 pm, ESPN+	(10)	at (1) Cleveland State; Quarterfinals	L 104–108 ^{3OT}	8–15	23 – Godfrey	9 – Kpedi	12 – Godfrey	Wolstein Center; Cleveland, OH
*Non-conference game. ^{#}Rankings from AP Poll. (#) Tournament seedings in parentheses. All times are in Eastern.
