= 2021 Horizon League men's basketball tournament =

- Classification: Division I
- Season: 2020–21
- Teams: 12
- Site: Campus sites (First Round and Quarterfinals); Indiana Farmers Coliseum; Indianapolis, Indiana (Semifinals and Finals)
- Champions: Cleveland State (2nd title)
- Winning coach: Dennis Gates (1st title)
- MVP: Torrey Patton (Cleveland State)
- Television: ESPN+, ESPNU, ESPN2, ESPN

2020–21 Horizon League men's basketball standings
	Conf.				Overall
Team	W		L	PCT	W		L	PCT
Wright State	16	–	4	.800	18	–	6	.750
Cleveland State †	16	–	4	.800	19	–	8	.704
Detroit Mercy	10	–	6	.625	12	–	10	.545
Northern Kentucky	11	–	7	.611	14	–	11	.560
Oakland	10	–	10	.500	12	–	18	.400
Youngstown State	9	–	11	.450	15	–	12	.556
IUPUI	7	–	9	.438	8	–	10	.444
Milwaukee	7	–	10	.412	10	–	12	.455
Green Bay	8	–	12	.400	8	–	17	.320
UIC	6	–	10	.375	9	–	13	.409
Purdue Fort Wayne	6	–	14	.300	8	–	15	.348
Robert Morris	3	–	12	.200	4	–	15	.211
† 2021 Horizon League tournament winner

The 2021 Horizon League men's basketball tournament was the final event of the 2020–21 men's basketball season for the Horizon League. It began on February 25, 2021, and ended on March 9; first-round and quarterfinal games were played at the home courts of the higher seed, with all remaining games at Indiana Farmers Coliseum in Indianapolis. The winner received the conference's automatic berth into the NCAA Tournament.

== Seeds ==
All of the teams participated in the tournament with the top-four teams receiving byes to the quarterfinals. Due to the unbalanced nature of the conference schedule because of COVID-19, teams were seeded by an unpublished formula generated by the league that took into account the following:

- League winning percentage
- Strength of schedule
- Weighting road wins vs. home wins
- Number of league games played

Seed	School	Winning pct	Strength of schedule	Road Wins / Home Wins	League games played
1	Cleveland State	.800		8 / 8	20
2	Wright State	.800		8 / 8	20
3	Oakland	.500		6 / 4	20
4	Northern Kentucky	.611		5 / 6	18
5	Detroit	.625		4 / 6	16
6	Youngstown State	.450		4 / 5	20
7	Green Bay	.400		2 / 6	20
8	Milwaukee	.412		4 / 3	17
9	IUPUI	.438		4 / 3	16
10	Purdue Fort Wayne	.300		2 / 4	20
11	UIC	.375		1 / 5	16
12	Robert Morris	.200		1 / 2	15

== Schedule ==
Game	Time	Matchup	Score	Television
First Round – Thursday, February 25
1	7:00 pm	No. 12 Robert Morris at No. 5 Detroit Mercy	73–83	ESPN+
2	8:00 pm	No. 11 UIC at No. 6 Youngstown State	58–74	ESPN+
3	8:00 pm	No. 10 Purdue Fort Wayne at No. 7 Green Bay	89–84 ^{2OT}	ESPN+
4	8:00 pm	No. 9 IUPUI at No. 8 Milwaukee	72–84	ESPN+
Quarterfinals – Tuesday, March 2
5	7:00 pm	No. 10 Purdue Fort Wayne at No. 1 Cleveland State	104–108 ^{3OT}	ESPN+
6	7:00 pm	No. 5 Detroit Mercy at No. 4 Northern Kentucky	69–70	ESPN+
7	7:00 pm	No. 8 Milwaukee at No. 2 Wright State	94–92 ^{OT}	ESPN+
8	7:30 pm	No. 6 Youngstown State at No. 3 Oakland	83–87 ^{OT}	ESPN+
Semifinals – Monday, March 8 at Indiana Farmers Coliseum, Indianapolis, IN
9	6:30 pm	No. 8 Milwaukee vs. No. 1 Cleveland State	65–71	ESPNU
10	9:30 pm	No. 4 Northern Kentucky vs. No. 3 Oakland	58–69	ESPN2
Championship – Tuesday, March 9 at Indiana Farmers Coliseum, Indianapolis, IN
11	7:00 pm	No. 1 Cleveland State vs. No. 3 Oakland	80–69	ESPN
All game times Eastern. Rankings denote tournament seed

== Bracket ==
First round Thursday, February 25
5	Detroit Mercy	83
12	Robert Morris	73
6	Youngstown State	74
11	UIC	58
7	Green Bay	84
10	Purdue Fort Wayne	89**
8	Milwaukee	84
9	IUPUI	72

Quarterfinals; Tuesday, March 2
1	Cleveland State	108***
10	Purdue Fort Wayne	104
2	Wright State	92
8	Milwaukee	94*
3	Oakland	87*
6	Youngstown State	83
4	Northern Kentucky	70
5	Detroit Mercy	69

Semifinals; Monday, March 8
1	Cleveland State	71
8	Milwaukee	65
3	Oakland	69
4	Northern Kentucky	58

Championship; Tuesday, March 9
1	Cleveland State	80
3	Oakland	69

* denotes overtime period

== Game summaries ==
=== First round ===
ESPN+

February 25, 2021
7:00 p.m. EST

No. 12 Robert Morris Colonials 73, No. 5 Detroit Mercy Titans 83
Scoring by half: 24–36, 49–47
Pts: K. Spear – 22; Rebs: 2 tied – 5 Asts: J. Williams – 9	Pts: A. Davis – 46; Rebs: C. Brandon – 13; Asts: M. Fraser – 6

Calihan Hall – Detroit, Michigan
Referees: Chad Barlow, Josh White, Ed Phillips

ESPN+

February 25, 2021
8:00 p.m. EST

No. 11 UIC Flames 58, No. 6 Youngstown State Penguins 74
Scoring by half: 25–35, 33–39
Pts: T. Kirk – 13; Rebs: 2 tied – 7 Asts: T. Kirk – 4	Pts: M. Akuchie – 16; Rebs: M. Akuchie – 10; Asts: N. Bohannon – 6

Beeghly Center – Youngstown, Ohio
Referees: Ron Tyburski, Jon Campbell, Scott Siville

ESPN+

February 25, 2021
8:00 p.m. EST

No. 10 Purdue Fort Wayne Mastodons 89, No. 7 Green Bay Phoenix 84 (2OT)
Scoring by half: 38–35, 31–34 Overtime: 9–9, 11–6
Pts: J. Pipkins – 21; Rebs: J. Godfrey – 7 Asts: J. Godfrey – 5	Pts: P. Pipes – 27; Rebs: E. Ansong – 7 Asts: L. Stieber – 5

Resch Center – Green Bay, Wisconsin
Referees: Bobby Daw, Matt Morales, Chris Pasci

ESPN+

February 25, 2021
8:00 p.m. EST

No. 9 IUPUI Jaguars 72, No. 8 Milwaukee Panthers 84
Scoring by half: 34–47, 38–37
Pts: J. Minnett – 13; Rebs: E. Goss – 17; Asts: M. Burk – 3	Pts: T. Lucas – 22; Rebs: A. Allen – 10; Asts: T. Lucas – 5

UW–Milwaukee Panther Arena – Milwaukee, Wisconsin
Referees: Steve Honacki, Brian Shore, Tariq Lucas

=== Quarterfinals ===
ESPN+

March 2, 2021
7:00 p.m. EST

No. 10 Purdue Fort Wayne Mastodons 104, No. 1 Cleveland State Vikings 108 (3OT)
Scoring by half: 28–27, 39–40 Overtime: 9–9, 13–13, 15–19
Pts: J. Godfrey – 23; Rebs: R. Kpedi – 9 Asts: J. Godfrey – 12	Pts: T. Patton – 30; Rebs: 2 tied – 13; Asts: T. Gomillion – 6

Wolstein Center – Cleveland, Ohio

ESPN+

March 2, 2021
7:00 p.m. EST

No. 8 Milwaukee Panthers 94, No. 2 Wright State Raiders 92 (OT)
Scoring by half: 26–44, 55–37 Overtime: 13–11
Pts: D. Gholston – 31; Rebs: D. Gholston – 9 Asts: T. Lucas – 5	Pts: G. Basile – 35; Rebs: G. Basile – 14; Asts: T. Holden – 3

Nutter Center – Fairborn, Ohio

ESPN+

March 2, 2021
7:00 p.m. EST

No. 5 Detroit Mercy Titans 69, No. 4 Northern Kentucky Norse 70
Scoring by half: 37–40, 32–30
Pts: B. Kuol – 20; Rebs: 2 tied – 5 Asts: A. Davis – 5	Pts: M. Warrick – 20; Rebs: T. Faulkner – 9 Asts: B. Langdon – 6

BB&T Arena – Highland Heights, Kentucky

ESPN+

March 2, 2021
7:30 p.m. EST

No. 6 Youngstown State Penguins 83, No. 3 Oakland Golden Grizzlies 87 (OT)
Scoring by half: 36–37, 37–36 Overtime: 10–14
Pts: G. Covington – 30; Rebs: N. Bohannon – 13; Asts: N. Bohannon – 11	Pts: R. Williams – 22; Rebs: D. Oladapo – 10; Asts: J. Moore – 11

Athletics Center O'rena – Auburn Hills, Michigan

=== Semifinals ===
ESPNU

March 8, 2021
6:30 p.m. EST

No. 8 Milwaukee Panthers vs. No. 1 Cleveland State Vikings

Indiana Farmers Coliseum – Indianapolis, Indiana

ESPN2

March 8, 2021
9:30 p.m. EST

No. 4 Northern Kentucky Norse vs. No. 3 Oakland Golden Grizzlies

Indiana Farmers Coliseum – Indianapolis, Indiana

=== Championship ===
ESPN

March 9, 2021
7:00 p.m. EST

Indiana Farmers Coliseum – Indianapolis, Indiana
