= 2020–21 Oakland Golden Grizzlies men's basketball team =

American college basketball season

2020–21 Oakland Golden Grizzlies men's basketball
- Conference: Horizon League
- Record: 12–18 (10–10 Horizon)
- Head coach: Greg Kampe (37th season)
- Associate head coach: Jeff Smith
- Assistant coaches: Tony Jones; Mychal Covington
- Home arena: Athletics Center O'rena

2020–21 Horizon League men's basketball standings
	Conf.				Overall
Team	W		L	PCT	W		L	PCT
Wright State	16	–	4	.800	18	–	6	.750
Cleveland State †	16	–	4	.800	19	–	8	.704
Detroit Mercy	10	–	6	.625	12	–	10	.545
Northern Kentucky	11	–	7	.611	14	–	11	.560
Oakland	10	–	10	.500	12	–	18	.400
Youngstown State	9	–	11	.450	15	–	12	.556
IUPUI	7	–	9	.438	8	–	10	.444
Milwaukee	7	–	10	.412	10	–	12	.455
Green Bay	8	–	12	.400	8	–	17	.320
UIC	6	–	10	.375	9	–	13	.409
Purdue Fort Wayne	6	–	14	.300	8	–	15	.348
Robert Morris	3	–	12	.200	4	–	15	.211
† 2021 Horizon League tournament winner

The 2020–21 Oakland Golden Grizzlies men's basketball team represented Oakland University in the 2020–21 NCAA Division I men's basketball season. The Golden Grizzlies, led by 37th-year head coach Greg Kampe, played their home games at the Athletics Center O'rena in Auburn Hills, Michigan as members of the Horizon League. In a season limited due to the ongoing COVID-19 pandemic, the Grizzlies finished the season 12–18, 10–10 in Horizon League play to finish in fifth place. They defeated Youngstown State and Northern Kentucky in the Horizon League tournament before losing to Cleveland State in the championship game.

== Previous season ==
The Golden Grizzlies finished the 2019–20 season 14–19, 8–10 in Horizon League play to finish in sixth place. They defeated Cleveland State in the first round of the Horizon League tournament before losing in the quarterfinals to Green Bay.

== Offseason ==
=== Departures ===
Name	Number	Pos.	Height	Weight	Year	Hometown	Notes
Brad Brechting	13	C	6'11"	240	RS Senior	Cedar Springs, MI	Graduated
Xavier Hill-Mais	14	F	6'7"	261	RS Senior	Greensboro, NC	Graduated
Kenny Pittman Jr.	24	G	6'3"	181	Sophomore	Chicago, IL	Transferred to Wayne State University
Tray Maddox Jr.	2	G	6'5"	200	Sophomore	Novi, MI	Transferred to Cal State Fullerton
Zach Goodline	10	G	6'1"	175	Freshman	Coloma, MI	Transferred to Huntington University
Madison Monroe	21	G	6'3"	185	Freshman	Charlotte, NC	Transferred to Independence Community College
CJ Gettelfinger	33	G	6'4"	186	Freshman	Knoxville, TN	Transferred to Tennessee Tech
Jackie Harris	35	F	6'6"	206	Freshman	Lambertville, MI	Transferred to Wayne State University

=== Incoming transfers ===
Name	Number	Pos.	Height	Weight	Year	Hometown	Previous School
Zion Young	0	G	6'4"	190	Junior	Chicago, IL	Transferred from Western Illinois
Jalen Moore	34	G	5'11"	155	Junior	Cloverdale, IN	Transferred from Olney Central College

== Roster ==
2020–21 Oakland Golden Grizzlies men's basketball team
Players
Coaches

Pos.	#	Name	Height	Weight	Year	Hometown
G	0	Zion Young	6 ft 4 in (1.93 m)	224 lb (102 kg)	Jr	Chicago, Illinois
G	1	Rashad Williams	6 ft 2 in (1.88 m)	184 lb (83 kg)	Jr	Detroit, Michigan
F	3	Micah Parrish	6 ft 6 in (1.98 m)	188 lb (85 kg)	Fr	Ypsilanti, Michigan
F	4	Daniel Oladapo	6 ft 7 in (2.01 m)	222 lb (101 kg)	Jr	Bladensburg, Maryland
G	5	Emmanuel Newsome	6 ft 0 in (1.83 m)	164 lb (74 kg)	So	Boca Raton, Florida
G	11	Blake Lampman	6 ft 3 in (1.91 m)	178 lb (81 kg)	So	Haslett, Michigan
F	12	PJ Joseph	6 ft 7 in (2.01 m)	241 lb (109 kg)	Fr	Brooklyn, New York
F	13	Trey Townsend	6 ft 6 in (1.98 m)	222 lb (101 kg)	Fr	Oxford, Michigan
G	15	Kevin Kangu	6 ft 4 in (1.93 m)	184 lb (83 kg)	Sr	Burlington, Ontario, Canada
C	22	Yusuf Jihad	6 ft 8 in (2.03 m)	224 lb (102 kg)	RS Fr	Farmington Hills, Michigan
F	23	Chris Conway	6 ft 10 in (2.08 m)	219 lb (99 kg)	Fr	Naperville, Illinois
G	30	Joey Holifield	6 ft 3 in (1.91 m)	190 lb (86 kg)	Fr	Toledo, Ohio
G	34	Jalen Moore	5 ft 11 in (1.8 m)	156 lb (71 kg)	Jr	Cloverdale, Indiana

Head coach

- Greg Kampe (Bowling Green)

Assistant coach(es)

- Jeff Smith (Southeast Missouri State)
- Tony Jones (Fisk)
- Mychal Covington (Oakland)

Legend

- (C) Team captain
- (S) Suspended
- (I) Ineligible
- (W) Walk-on
- Injured
- Current redshirt

Roster
Last update: December 23, 2020

== Schedule and results ==
Date time, TV	Rank^{#}	Opponent^{#}	Result	Record	Site (attendance) city, state
Non-conference regular season
November 25, 2020*; Noon, FS1		at Xavier; Xavier Invitational	L 49–101	0–1	Cintas Center (300); Cincinnati, OH
November 26, 2020*; 3:00 pm, FloSports		vs. Toledo; Xavier Invitational	L 53–80	0–2	Cintas Center (36); Cincinnati, OH
November 27, 2020*; 3:00 pm, FloSports		vs. Bradley; Xavier Invitational	L 60–74	0–3	Cintas Center (58); Cincinnati, OH
November 29, 2020*; 6:00 pm, BTN		at No. 25 Michigan	L 71–81 ^{OT}	0–4	Crisler Center; Ann Arbor, MI
December 1, 2020*; 3:00 pm, BTN		at Purdue	L 50–93	0–5	Mackey Arena; West Lafayette, IN
December 5, 2020*; 7:30 pm, ESPN+		at Oklahoma State	L 71–84	0–6	Gallagher-Iba Arena (3,350); Stillwater, OK
December 13, 2020*; Noon, FS1		at No. 4 Michigan State	L 91–109	0–7	Breslin Center; East Lansing, MI
Horizon League regular season
December 19, 2020; 7:00 pm, ESPN+		at UIC	L 72–74	0–8 (0–1)	Credit Union 1 Arena; Chicago, IL
December 20, 2020; 5:00 pm, ESPN+		at UIC	L 73–90	0–9 (0–2)	Credit Union 1 Arena; Chicago, IL
December 26, 2020; 7:00 pm		Northern Kentucky	Canceled due to NKU; COVID-related matters		Athletics Center O'rena; Auburn Hills, MI
December 27, 2020; 3:00 pm		Northern Kentucky	Canceled due to NKU; COVID-related matters		Athletics Center O'rena; Auburn Hills, MI
December 26, 2019; 4:00 pm, ESPN3		Detroit Mercy	W 77–75	1–9 (1–2)	Calihan Hall; Detroit, MI
December 27, 2019; 4:00 pm, ESPN3		Detroit Mercy	W 83–80	2–9 (2–2)	Calihan Hall; Detroit, MI
January 1, 2021; 7:00 pm, ESPN3		Wright State	L 51–90	2–10 (2–3)	Athletics Center O'rena; Auburn Hills, MI
January 2, 2021; 5:00 pm, WMYD		Wright State	W 81–71	3–10 (3–3)	Athletics Center O'rena; Auburn Hills, MI
January 8, 2021; 5:00 pm, ESPN+		at Green Bay	L 81–84 ^{OT}	3–11 (3–4)	Kress Events Center; Green Bay, WI
January 9, 2021; 5:00 pm, ESPN+		at Green Bay	L 78–87	3–12 (3–5)	Kress Events Center; Green Bay, WI
January 15, 2021; 7:00 pm, ESPN3		Youngstown State	W 82–65	4–12 (4–5)	Athletics Center O'rena; Auburn Hills, MI
January 16, 2021; 3:00 pm, WMYD		Youngstown State	W 81–74	5–12 (5–5)	Athletics Center O'rena; Auburn Hills, MI
January 22, 2019; 7:00 pm, ESPN+		Detroit Mercy	W 86–61	6–12 (6–5)	Athletics Center O'rena; Auburn Hills, MI
January 23, 2019; 5:00 pm, WMYD		Detroit Mercy	L 72–82	6–13 (6–6)	Athletics Center O'rena; Auburn Hills, MI
January 29, 2021; 7:00 pm, ESPN3		at Purdue Fort Wayne	W 81–66	7–13 (7–6)	Hilliard Gates Sports Center; Fort Wayne, IN
January 30, 2021; 5:00 pm, ESPN3		at Purdue Fort Wayne	W 82–75	8–13 (8–6)	Hilliard Gates Sports Center; Fort Wayne, IN
February 5, 2021; 7:00 pm, WMYD		Cleveland State	L 72–80	8–14 (8–7)	Athletics Center O'rena; Auburn Hills, MI
February 6, 2021; 5:00 pm, WMYD		Cleveland State	L 78–80	8–15 (8–8)	Athletics Center O'rena; Auburn Hills, MI
February 12, 2021; 7:00 pm, ESPN3		at Robert Morris	L 82–88	8–16 (8–9)	UPMC Events Center; Moon Township, PA
February 13, 2021; 5:00 pm, ESPN3		at Robert Morris	W 86–81	9–16 (9–9)	UPMC Events Center; Moon Township, PA
February 19, 2021; 7:00 pm, ESPN3		at Milwaukee	W 85–81	10–16 (10–9)	Klotsche Center; Milwaukee, WI
February 20, 2021; 6:00 pm, ESPN3		at Milwaukee	L 87–89 ^{2OT}	10–17 (10–10)	Klotsche Center; Milwaukee, WI
Horizon League tournament
March 2, 2021; 7:30 pm, ESPN+	(3)	(6) Youngstown State; Quarterfinals	W 87–83 ^{OT}	11–17	Athletics Center O'rena; Auburn Hills, MI
March 8, 2021; 9:30 pm, ESPN+	(3)	vs. (4) Northern Kentucky; Semifinals	W 69–58	12–17	Indiana Farmers Coliseum; Indianapolis, IN
March 9, 2021; 7:00 pm, ESPN	(3)	vs. (1) Cleveland State; Championship	L 69–80	12–18	Indiana Farmers Coliseum; Indianapolis, IN
*Non-conference game. ^{#}Rankings from AP Poll. (#) Tournament seedings in parentheses. All times are in Eastern.
