= 2020–21 Detroit Mercy Titans men's basketball team =

American college basketball season

2020–21 Detroit Mercy Titans men's basketball
- Conference: Horizon League
- Record: 12–10 (10–6 Horizon)
- Head coach: Mike Davis (3rd season)
- Assistant coaches: Mike Davis Jr.; Tracy Dildy
- Home arena: Calihan Hall

2020–21 Horizon League men's basketball standings
| | Conf. | | | | Overall |
| Team | W | | L | PCT | W | | L | PCT |
|---|---|---|---|---|---|---|---|---|
| Wright State | 16 | – | 4 | .800 | 18 | – | 6 | .750 |
| Cleveland State † | 16 | – | 4 | .800 | 19 | – | 8 | .704 |
| Detroit Mercy | 10 | – | 6 | .625 | 12 | – | 10 | .545 |
| Northern Kentucky | 11 | – | 7 | .611 | 14 | – | 11 | .560 |
| Oakland | 10 | – | 10 | .500 | 12 | – | 18 | .400 |
| Youngstown State | 9 | – | 11 | .450 | 15 | – | 12 | .556 |
| IUPUI | 7 | – | 9 | .438 | 8 | – | 10 | .444 |
| Milwaukee | 7 | – | 10 | .412 | 10 | – | 12 | .455 |
| Green Bay | 8 | – | 12 | .400 | 8 | – | 17 | .320 |
| UIC | 6 | – | 10 | .375 | 9 | – | 13 | .409 |
| Purdue Fort Wayne | 6 | – | 14 | .300 | 8 | – | 15 | .348 |
| Robert Morris | 3 | – | 12 | .200 | 4 | – | 15 | .211 |
† 2021 Horizon League tournament winner

The 2020–21 Detroit Mercy Titans men's basketball team represented the University of Detroit Mercy in the 2020–21 NCAA Division I men's basketball season. The Titans, led by third-year head coach Mike Davis, played their home games at Calihan Hall in Detroit, Michigan as members of the Horizon League. The Titans finished the season 12–10, 10–6 in Horizon League play, to finish in third place.

== Previous season ==
The Titans finished the 2019–20 season 8–23, 6–12 in Horizon League play, to finish in ninth place. Due to low APR scores, the Titans were ineligible for postseason play.

== Roster ==
2020–21 Detroit Mercy Titans men's basketball team
Players
Coaches

| Pos. | # | Name | Height | Weight | Year | Hometown |
|---|---|---|---|---|---|---|
| G | 0 | Antoine Davis | 6 ft 1 in (1.85 m) | 165 lb (75 kg) | Jr | Birmingham, AL |
| G/F | 1 | Noah Waterman | 6 ft 11 in (2.11 m) | 210 lb (95 kg) | RS Fr | Savannah, NY |
| G | 2 | Kyle Legreair | 6 ft 0 in (1.83 m) | 180 lb (82 kg) | Fr | Detroit, MI |
| G | 4 | Dwayne Rose Jr. | 6 ft 4 in (1.93 m) | 195 lb (88 kg) | Sr | Crete, IL |
| G/F | 10 | Bul Kuol | 6 ft 7 in (2.01 m) | 205 lb (93 kg) | GS | Canberra, Australia |
| G | 12 | Brad Calipari | 6 ft 0 in (1.83 m) | 180 lb (82 kg) | GS | Franklin Lakes, NJ |
| G | 13 | Matt Johnson | 6 ft 4 in (1.93 m) | 180 lb (82 kg) | Sr | Baltimore, MD |
| F | 15 | Taurean Thompson | 6 ft 11 in (2.11 m) | 245 lb (111 kg) | GS | New York, NY |
| G | 20 | Jamail Pink | 6 ft 1 in (1.85 m) | 164 lb (74 kg) | So | Houston, TX |
| G/F | 21 | Chris Brandon | 6 ft 8 in (2.03 m) | 212 lb (96 kg) | Jr | Houston, TX |
| G | 25 | Marquell Fraser | 6 ft 5 in (1.96 m) | 200 lb (91 kg) | GS | Hamilton, ON |
| G | 30 | Joey Liedel | 6 ft 1 in (1.85 m) | 175 lb (79 kg) | Fr | Erie, MI |
| C | 33 | Buay Koka | 7 ft 1 in (2.16 m) | 202 lb (92 kg) | GS | Nasir, South Sudan |
| F | 41 | Willy Isiani | 6 ft 8 in (2.03 m) | 230 lb (104 kg) | Jr | Tbilisi, Georgia |
| G | 55 | Caileb Brown | 6 ft 0 in (1.83 m) | 155 lb (70 kg) | Fr | Lansing, MI |

Head coach

- Mike Davis (Alabama)

Assistant coach(es)

- Mike Davis Jr. (UAB)
- Tracy Dildy (UIC)

Legend

- (C) Team captain
- (S) Suspended
- (I) Ineligible
- (W) Walk-on
- Injured
- Current redshirt

Roster
Last update: December 25, 2020

== Schedule and results ==
| Date time, TV | Rank^{#} | Opponent^{#} | Result | Record | Site (attendance) city, state |
Regular season
| December 4, 2020*; 5:00 pm, BTN | | at No. 8 Michigan State | L 76–83 | 0–1 | Breslin Student Events Center; East Lansing, MI |
| December 6, 2020*; 7:00 pm, ACCN | | at Notre Dame | L 70–78 | 0–2 | Purcell Pavilion (84); Notre Dame, IN |
| December 8, 2020*; 7:00 pm, ESPN3 | | Kent State | L 66–80 | 0–3 | Calihan Hall; Detroit, MI |
| December 12, 2020*; 2:00 pm, ESPN3 | | at Western Michigan | W 67–57 | 1–3 | University Arena; Kalamazoo, MI |
| December 19, 2020; 2:00 pm, ESPN3 | | Wright State | L 70–93 | 1–4 (0–1) | Calihan Hall; Detroit, MI |
| December 20, 2020; 2:00 pm, ESPN3 | | Wright State | L 72–85 | 1–5 (0–2) | Calihan Hall; Detroit, MI |
| December 26, 2020; 4:00 pm, ESPN3 | | Oakland | L 75–77 ^{OT} | 1–6 (0–3) | Calihan Hall; Detroit, MI |
| December 27, 2020; 4:00 pm, ESPN3 | | Oakland | L 80–83 | 1–7 (0–4) | Calihan Hall; Detroit, MI |
| January 15, 2021; 7:00 pm, ESPN+ | | Green Bay | W 86–61 | 2–7 (1–4) | Calihan Hall; Detroit, MI |
| January 16, 2021; 7:00 pm, ESPN+ | | Green Bay | W 68–65 | 3–7 (2–4) | Calihan Hall; Detroit, MI |
| January 22, 2021; 7:00 pm, ESPN+ | | at Oakland | L 81–86 | 3–8 (2–5) | Athletics Center O'rena; Auburn Hills, MI |
| January 23, 2021; 5:00 pm, ESPN+ | | at Oakland | W 82–72 | 4–8 (3–5) | Athletics Center O'rena; Auburn Hills, MI |
| January 29, 2021; 5:00 pm, ESPN3 | | at Youngstown State | W 78–75 | 5–8 (4–5) | Beeghly Center; Youngstown, OH |
| January 30, 2021; 5:00 pm, ESPN3 | | at Youngstown State | W 77–72 | 6–8 (5–5) | Beeghly Center; Youngstown, OH |
| February 5, 2021; 6:00 pm, ESPN3 | | Purdue Fort Wayne | W 82–72 | 7–8 (6–5) | Calihan Hall; Detroit, MI |
| February 6, 2021; 5:00 pm, ESPN3 | | Purdue Fort Wayne | W 83–56 | 8–8 (7–5) | Calihan Hall; Detroit, MI |
| February 12, 2021; 7:00 pm, ESPNU | | at Cleveland State | W 89–83 | 9–8 (8–5) | Wolstein Center; Cleveland, OH |
| February 13, 2021; 7:00 pm, ESPN+ | | at Cleveland State | L 64–71 | 9–9 (8–6) | Wolstein Center; Cleveland, OH |
| February 19, 2021; 6:00 pm, ESPN3 | | Robert Morris | W 85–74 | 10–9 (9–6) | Calihan Hall; Detroit, MI |
| February 20, 2021; 5:00 pm, ESPN3 | | Robert Morris | W 80–61 | 11–9 (10–6) | Calihan Hall; Detroit, MI |
Horizon League tournament
| February 25, 2021; 7:00 pm, ESPN+ | (5) | (12) Robert Morris; First round | W 83–73 | 12–9 | Calihan Hall; Detroit, MI |
| March 2, 2021; 7:00 pm, ESPN+ | (5) | at (4) Northern Kentucky; Quarterfinals | L 69–70 | 12–10 | BB&T Arena; Highland Heights, KY |
*Non-conference game. ^{#}Rankings from AP poll. (#) Tournament seedings in parentheses. All times are in Eastern Time.
