= Eric Haut =

American basketball coach

Current position
- Title: Head coach
- Team: Tarleton State
- Conference: UAC
- Record: 4–2 (.667)

Playing career
- 2000–2004: Kent State

Coaching career (HC unless noted)
- 2004–2005: Western Kentucky (GA)
- 2006–2008: Kent State (assistant)
- 2008–2011: TCU (assistant)
- 2011–2016: Kent State (assistant)
- 2016–2019: Kent State (associate HC)
- 2019–2022: Northern Kentucky (assistant)
- 2022–2024: Northern Kentucky (associate HC)
- 2024–2026: Utah State (associate HC)
- 2026–present: Tarleton State

Administrative career (AD unless noted)
- 2005–2006: Kent State (DBO)

Head coaching record
- Overall: 4–2 (.667)

Eric Haut is an American basketball coach and former player. He is currently the head coach of the Tarleton State Texans men's basketball team.

== Career ==
Haut played college basketball as a guard at Kent State, where he was a member of the Golden Flashes' 2002 Elite Eight run. He began his coaching career in 2004, serving as a graduate assistant at Western Kentucky for a season. Haut then was named the director of basketball operations at Kent State in 2005 and later served as an assistant coach from 2006 to 2008. He then coached for three seasons as an assistant at TCU, before returning to Kent State in 2011. Prior to the 2016 season, Haut was promoted to associate head coach. After eight seasons at his alma mater, he was hired as an assistant at Northern Kentucky. On May 14, 2024, Haut was named the associate head coach at Utah State.

On March 12, 2026, Haut was named the next head coach at Tarleton State, replacing Billy Gillispie.

== Head coaching record ==
Record table
Season	Team	Overall	Conference	Standing	Postseason
Tarleton State (United Athletic Conference) (2026–present)
2026–27	Tarleton State	4–2	0–0		
Tarleton State:		4–2 (.667)	0–0 (–)		
Total:		4–2 (.667)			
National champion Postseason invitational champion Conference regular season champion Conference regular season and conference tournament champion Division regular season champion Division regular season and conference tournament champion Conference tournament champion
