= 2020–21 IUPUI Jaguars men's basketball team =

American college basketball season

2020–21 IUPUI Jaguars men's basketball
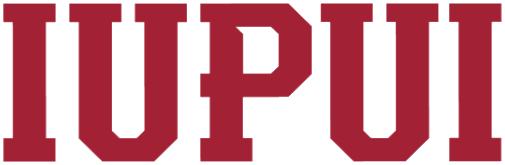
- Conference: Horizon League
- Record: 8–10 (7–9 Horizon)
- Head coach: Byron Rimm II (2nd season)
- Assistant coaches: Matt Dunn; Isaac Loechle; Aaron Evans
- Home arena: Indiana Farmers Coliseum

2020–21 Horizon League men's basketball standings
	Conf.				Overall
Team	W		L	PCT	W		L	PCT
Wright State	16	–	4	.800	18	–	6	.750
Cleveland State †	16	–	4	.800	19	–	8	.704
Detroit Mercy	10	–	6	.625	12	–	10	.545
Northern Kentucky	11	–	7	.611	14	–	11	.560
Oakland	10	–	10	.500	12	–	18	.400
Youngstown State	9	–	11	.450	15	–	12	.556
IUPUI	7	–	9	.438	8	–	10	.444
Milwaukee	7	–	10	.412	10	–	12	.455
Green Bay	8	–	12	.400	8	–	17	.320
UIC	6	–	10	.375	9	–	13	.409
Purdue Fort Wayne	6	–	14	.300	8	–	15	.348
Robert Morris	3	–	12	.200	4	–	15	.211
† 2021 Horizon League tournament winner

The 2020–21 IUPUI Jaguars men's basketball team represented Indiana University – Purdue University Indianapolis in the 2020–21 NCAA Division I men's basketball season. The Jaguars, led by second-year head coach Byron Rimm II, played their home games at Indiana Farmers Coliseum in Indianapolis, Indiana as members of the Horizon League.

== Previous season ==
The Jaguars finished the 2019–20 season 7–25, 3–15 in Horizon League play to finish in last place. They lost in the first round of the Horizon League tournament to UIC.

== Roster ==
2020–21 IUPUI Jaguars men's basketball team
Players
Coaches

Pos.	#	Name	Height	Weight	Year	Hometown
G	0	Jaylen Minnett	6 ft 1 in (1.85 m)	180 lb (82 kg)	Sr	Terre Haute, Indiana
G	2	Bobby Harvey	6 ft 3 in (1.91 m)	200 lb (91 kg)	Jr	Chicago, Illinois
G	4	Bakari Lastrap	6 ft 0 in (1.83 m)	170 lb (77 kg)	Fr	Houston, Texas
G	5	Nathan McClure	6 ft 4 in (1.93 m)	175 lb (79 kg)	So	Houston, Texas
G	10	Mike DePersia	5 ft 11 in (1.8 m)	170 lb (77 kg)	So	Cherry Hill, New Jersey
G	12	Azariah Seay	6 ft 4 in (1.93 m)	195 lb (88 kg)	RS Jr	Montgomery, Alabama
G	14	Marcus Burk	6 ft 3 in (1.91 m)	195 lb (88 kg)	RS Sr	Indianapolis, Indiana
G	15	Amrit Dhaliwal	6 ft 0 in (1.83 m)	175 lb (79 kg)	So	Modesto, California
F	20	Sawyer Stoltz	6 ft 9 in (2.06 m)	200 lb (91 kg)	So	Huntington, Indiana
G	23	Dimitri Georgiadis	6 ft 9 in (2.06 m)	245 lb (111 kg)	Jr	Richmond, Virginia
F	24	Johnah Carrasco	6 ft 9 in (2.06 m)	220 lb (100 kg)	Jr	Wichita, Kansas
F	32	Elyjah Goss	6 ft 7 in (2.01 m)	215 lb (98 kg)	Sr	Bolingbrook, Illinois
F	33	Dimitar Pandev	6 ft 10 in (2.08 m)	225 lb (102 kg)	Jr	Strumica, North Macedonia
C	50	Acton Shirley	7 ft 0 in (2.13 m)	260 lb (118 kg)	Jr	Zebulon, Georgia

Head coach

- Byron Rimm II (Cal State LA)

Assistant coach(es)

- Matt Dunn (Fort Hays State)
- Isaac Loechle (Anderson (IN))
- Aaron Evans (Marian (IN))

Legend

- (C) Team captain
- (S) Suspended
- (I) Ineligible
- (W) Walk-on
- Injured
- Current redshirt

Roster
Last update: December 18, 2020

== Schedule and results ==
The Jaguars had planned to play only three non-conference games, two of which were cancelled due to COVID-19 concerns. Their first four conference road games, at Purdue Fort Wayne and Detroit Mercy, were also cancelled.

Date time, TV	Rank^{#}	Opponent^{#}	Result	Record	Site (attendance) city, state
Regular season
December 12, 2020*; 12:00 pm, ESPN3		Tennessee State	W 69–66	1–0	Indiana Farmers Coliseum; Indianapolis, IN
January 1, 2021; 2:00 pm, ESPN+		Cleveland State	L 62–65	1–1 (0–1)	Indiana Farmers Coliseum; Indianapolis, IN
January 2, 2021; 12:00 pm, ESPN+		Cleveland State	L 49–59	1–2 (0–2)	Indiana Farmers Coliseum; Indianapolis, IN
January 8, 2021; 12:00 pm, ESPN3		at Milwaukee	L 70–94	1–3 (0–3)	Klotsche Center; Milwaukee, WI
January 9, 2021; 12:00 pm, ESPN3		at Milwaukee	L 63–71	1–4 (0–4)	Klotsche Center; Milwaukee, WI
January 15, 2021; 6:00 pm, ESPN3		at Northern Kentucky	W 74–69	2–4 (1–4)	BB&T Arena; Highland Heights, KY
January 16, 2021; 6:00 pm, ESPN3		at Northern Kentucky	W 65–63	3–4 (2–4)	BB&T Arena; Highland Heights, KY
January 22, 2021; 12:00 pm, ESPN3		Wright State	L 65–95	3–5 (2–5)	Indiana Farmers Coliseum; Indianapolis, IN
January 23, 2021; 12:00 pm, ESPN3		Wright State	L 72–100	3–6 (2–6)	Indiana Farmers Coliseum; Indianapolis, IN
January 29, 2021; 6:00 pm, ESPN3		Milwaukee	W 73–68	4–6 (3–6)	Indiana Farmers Coliseum; Indianapolis, IN
January 30, 2021; 3:00 pm, ESPN3		Milwaukee	L 76–83	4–7 (3–7)	Indiana Farmers Coliseum; Indianapolis, IN
February 5, 2021; 7:00 pm, ESPN3		at Green Bay	W 80–71	5–7 (4–7)	Kress Events Center; Green Bay, WI
February 6, 2021; 5:00 pm, ESPN3		at Green Bay	L 72–79	5–8 (4–8)	Kress Events Center; Green Bay, WI
February 12, 2021; 1:00 pm, ESPN+		UIC	W 89–69	6–8 (5–8)	Indiana Farmers Coliseum; Indianapolis, IN
February 13, 2021; 12:00 pm, ESPN+		UIC	W 88–81	7–8 (6–8)	Indiana Farmers Coliseum; Indianapolis, IN
February 19, 2021; 5:00 pm, ESPN3		at Youngstown State	W 72–70	8–8 (7–8)	Beeghly Center; Youngstown, OH
February 20, 2021; 5:00 pm, ESPN3		at Youngstown State	L 70–77	8–9 (7–9)	Beeghly Center; Youngstown, OH
Horizon League tournament
February 25, 2021; 7:00 pm, ESPN+	(9)	at (8) Milwaukee; First Round	L 72–84	8–10	Klotsche Center; Milwaukee, WI
*Non-conference game. ^{#}Rankings from AP Poll. (#) Tournament seedings in parentheses. All times are in Eastern.
