= Marcus Burk =

American basketball player

Free agent
- Position: Point guard

Personal information
- Born: September 27, 1997 (age 29) Munster, Indiana, U.S.
- Listed height: 6 ft 3 in (1.91 m)
- Listed weight: 205 lb (93 kg)

Career information
- High school: Franklin Central (Indianapolis, Indiana)
- College: Campbell (2016–2018); IUPUI (2019–2021)
- NBA draft: 2021: undrafted
- Playing career: 2021–present

Career history
- 2021–2022: Grand Rapids Gold
- 2022: Twarde Pierniki Toruń
- 2023: Grand Rapids Gold
- 2023–2025: Santa Cruz Warriors
- 2026: Valley Suns

Career highlights
- 2× Second-team All-Horizon League (2020, 2021)

Marcus Burk (born September 27, 1997) is an American professional basketball player who last played for the Valley Suns of the NBA G League. He played college basketball for the Campbell Fighting Camels and the IUPUI Jaguars.

== High school career ==
Burk attended Franklin Central High School, and led the team to four straight sectional titles. As a junior, he averaged 19 points, five rebounds and two assists per game, earning All-Conference honors. He scored 40 points against Columbus East High School. In the Class 4A regional semifinals, Burk posted 36 points, though the Flashes lost to FJ Reitz High School, 81–80. As a senior, he averaged 25.3 points, 5.7 rebounds and 2.7 assists and 2.1 steals per game, earning First Team Super Team honors from The Indianapolis Star. In April 2016, Burk committed to playing college basketball for Campbell, the first Division I school to offer him a scholarship, though he also received interest from Maine, Lincoln Memorial, King, and Saginaw Valley State.

== College career ==
As a freshman at Campbell, Burk averaged 8 points and 2.4 rebounds per game. He was named Big South Player of the Week on November 27, 2017, after scoring 33 points against UNC Wilmington. Burk averaged 14.8 points and 3.6 rebounds per game as a sophomore. Following the season, he transferred to IUPUI. On January 25, 2020, Burk scored a career-high 39 points in an 89–85 overtime win against Oakland. Burk averaged 21.3 points and 3.4 rebounds per game as a junior, earning Second Team All-Horizon League honors. Following the season, he declared for the 2020 NBA draft, but ultimately returned to IUPUI. In the offseason, he focused on losing weight, building muscle, and improving his playmaking. As a senior, Burk averaged 21.7 points, 3.7 rebounds, 2.2 assists and 1.8 steals per game. He was named to the Second Team All-Horizon League.

== Professional career ==
In October 2021, Burk joined the Grand Rapids Gold after a successful tryout.

On August 10, 2022, Burk signed with Twarde Pierniki Toruń of the Polish Basketball League (PLK).

On January 26, 2023, Burk was reacquired by the Grand Rapids Gold.

On October 30, 2023, Burk joined the Santa Cruz Warriors.

== Career statistics ==
Legend
GP	Games played	GS	Games started	MPG	Minutes per game
FG%	Field goal percentage	3P%	3-point field goal percentage	FT%	Free throw percentage
RPG	Rebounds per game	APG	Assists per game	SPG	Steals per game
BPG	Blocks per game	PPG	Points per game	**Bold**	Career high

=== College ===
Year	Team	GP	GS	MPG	FG%	3P%	FT%	RPG	APG	SPG	BPG	PPG
2016–17	Campbell	**36**	12	20.9	.429	.401	.784	2.4	.8	.5	.1	8.0
2017–18	Campbell	33	**32**	40.0	**.490**	.403	**.850**	3.6	1.2	1.3	.2	14.8
2018–19	IUPUI	Redshirt										
2019–20	IUPUI	32	**32**	**34.8**	.432	.386	.782	3.4	1.9	1.2	.3	21.3
2020–21	IUPUI	18	17	34.1	.481	**.409**	.802	**3.7**	**2.2**	**1.8**	**.4**	**21.7**
Career		119	93	29.7	.456	.398	.800	3.2	1.4	1.1	.2	15.5
