= 2019–20 Wright State Raiders men's basketball team =

American college basketball season

2019–20 Wright State Raiders men's basketball

Horizon League regular season champions
- Conference: Horizon League
- Record: 25–7 (15–3 Horizon)
- Head coach: Scott Nagy (4th season)
- Associate head coach: Brian Cooley
- Assistant coaches: Sharif Chambliss; Clint Sargent
- Home arena: Nutter Center

2019–20 Horizon League men's basketball standings
| | Conf. | | | | Overall |
| Team | W | | L | PCT | W | | L | PCT |
|---|---|---|---|---|---|---|---|---|
| Wright State | 15 | – | 3 | .833 | 25 | – | 7 | .781 |
| Northern Kentucky † | 13 | – | 5 | .722 | 23 | – | 9 | .719 |
| Green Bay | 11 | – | 7 | .611 | 17 | – | 16 | .515 |
| Youngstown State | 10 | – | 8 | .556 | 18 | – | 15 | .545 |
| UIC | 10 | – | 8 | .556 | 18 | – | 17 | .514 |
| Oakland | 8 | – | 10 | .444 | 14 | – | 19 | .424 |
| Cleveland State | 7 | – | 11 | .389 | 11 | – | 21 | .344 |
| Milwaukee | 7 | – | 11 | .389 | 12 | – | 19 | .387 |
| Detroit Mercy* | 6 | – | 12 | .333 | 8 | – | 23 | .258 |
| IUPUI | 3 | – | 15 | .167 | 7 | – | 25 | .219 |
† 2020 Horizon League Tournament winner * Ineligible for postseason due to APR violations

The 2019–20 Wright State Raiders men's basketball team represented Wright State University in the 2019–20 NCAA Division I men's basketball season. The Raiders, led by fourth-year head coach Scott Nagy, played their home games at the Nutter Center in Fairborn, Ohio as members of the Horizon League. They finished the season 25–7, 15–3 in Horizon League play to be regular season Horizon League champions. They lost in the semifinals of the Horizon League tournament to UIC. As regular season league champions who failed to win their league tournament, they received an automatic bid to the National Invitation Tournament. However, the NIT, and all other postseason tournament, were cancelled amid the COVID-19 pandemic.

== Previous season ==
The Raiders finished the 2018–19 season 21–14 overall, 13–5 in Horizon League play, finishing as co-regular season champions, alongside Northern Kentucky. In the Horizon League tournament, they defeated IUPUI in the quarterfinals, Green Bay in the semifinals, before falling to Northern Kentucky in the championship game. As a regular season league champion who failed to win their league tournament, they received an automatic bid to the NIT, where they lost to Clemson in the first round.

== Roster ==
2019–20 Wright State Raiders men's basketball team
Players
Coaches

| Pos. | # | Name | Height | Weight | Year | Hometown |
|---|---|---|---|---|---|---|
| G | 0 | Jaylon Hall | 6 ft 5 in (1.96 m) | 190 lb (86 kg) | So | Houston, Texas |
| F | 1 | Bill Wampler | 6 ft 6 in (1.98 m) | 220 lb (100 kg) | Sr | Eau Claire, Wisconsin |
| G | 2 | Tanner Holden | 6 ft 6 in (1.98 m) | 185 lb (84 kg) | Fr | Wheelersburg, Ohio |
| G | 3 | Jordan Ash | 6 ft 3 in (1.91 m) | 205 lb (93 kg) | Sr | Bolingbrook, Illinois |
| G | 4 | Andre Harris | 6 ft 3 in (1.91 m) | 190 lb (86 kg) | Fr | Lyndhurst, Ohio |
| G | 10 | Trey Calvin | 6 ft 0 in (1.83 m) | 165 lb (75 kg) | Fr | Glendale Heights, Illinois |
| C | 11 | Loudon Love | 6 ft 8 in (2.03 m) | 260 lb (118 kg) | Jr | Geneva, Illinois |
| F | 20 | Andy Neff | 6 ft 7 in (2.01 m) | 215 lb (98 kg) | So | Oakwood, Ohio |
| F | 21 | Grant Basile | 6 ft 9 in (2.06 m) | 225 lb (102 kg) | Fr | Pewaukee, Wisconsin |
| F | 22 | Aleksandar Dozic | 6 ft 9 in (2.06 m) | 215 lb (98 kg) | Sr | Podgorica, Montenegro |
| F | 23 | James Manns | 6 ft 7 in (2.01 m) | 210 lb (95 kg) | So | Columbus, Ohio |
| G | 24 | Tim Finke | 6 ft 6 in (1.98 m) | 215 lb (98 kg) | So | Champaign, Illinois |
| G | 31 | Cole Gentry | 5 ft 10 in (1.78 m) | 180 lb (82 kg) | Sr | St. Charles, Illinois |
| G | 32 | TJ Nagy | 6 ft 1 in (1.85 m) | 175 lb (79 kg) | Fr | Bellbrook, Ohio |
| F | 33 | Ryan Custer | 6 ft 7 in (2.01 m) | 235 lb (107 kg) | Sr | Cincinnati, Ohio |

Head coach

- Scott Nagy (Delta State)

Assistant coach(es)

- Brian Cooley (Nebraska Wesleyan)
- Sharif Chambliss (Wisconsin)
- Clint Sargent (South Dakota State)

Legend

- (C) Team captain
- (S) Suspended
- (I) Ineligible
- (W) Walk-on
- Injured
- Current redshirt

Roster
Last update: January 25, 2020

== Schedule and results ==
| Date time, TV | Rank^{#} | Opponent^{#} | Result | Record | High points | High rebounds | High assists | Site (attendance) city, state |
Non-conference regular season
| November 5, 2019*; 7:00 pm, ESPN3 | | Central State | W 96–77 | 1–0 | 21 – Holden | 7 – Holden | 5 – Gentry | Nutter Center (3,771); Fairborn, OH |
| November 9, 2019*; 2:00 pm, ESPN3 | | at Miami (OH) | W 88–81 | 2–0 | 27 – Love | 16 – Love | 2 – Tied | Millett Hall (2,034); Oxford, OH |
| November 12, 2019*; 7:30 pm, ESPN+ | | at Tennessee Tech | W 85–80 ^{OT} | 3-0 | 20 – Wampler | 14 – Holden | 6 – Hall | Eblen Center (1,255); Cookeville, TN |
| November 16, 2019*; 7:00 pm, ESPN3 | | Kent State | L 71–72 | 3-1 | 18 – Wampler | 9 – Love | 5 – Gentry | Nutter Center (4,216); Fairborn, OH |
| November 20, 2019*; 7:00 pm, ESPN+ | | Urbana; Gulf Coast Showcase campus-site game | W 88–51 | 4–1 | 19 – Basile | 6 – Tied | 6 – Hall | Nutter Center (3,402); Fairborn, OH |
| November 25, 2019*; 5:00 pm, FloSports | | vs. Weber State; Gulf Coast Showcase first round | W 72–57 | 5–1 | 27 – Wampler | 12 – Love | 3 – Wampler | Hertz Arena (893); Estero, FL |
| November 26, 2019*; 7:30 pm, FloSports | | vs. La Salle; Gulf Coast Showcase semifinals | L 70–72 | 5–2 | 15 – Tied | 7 – Basile | 3 – Wampler | Hertz Arena (738); Estero, FL |
| November 27, 2019*; 5:00 pm, FloSports | | vs. Miami (OH); Gulf Coast Showcase 3rd place game | W 71–66 | 6–2 | 17 – Tied | 12 – Basile | 3 – Hall | Hertz Arena (712); Estero, FL |
| December 3, 2019*; 7:00 pm, ESPN+ | | Western Kentucky | W 76–74 | 7–2 | 22 – Wampler | 10 – Basile | 4 – Hall | Nutter Center (3,178); Fairborn, OH |
| December 7, 2019*; 2:00 pm, ESPN+ | | Indiana State | L 77–84 ^{OT} | 7–3 | 15 – Calvin | 11 – Wampler | 5 – Wampler | Nutter Center (3,509); Fairborn, OH |
| December 12, 2019*; 7:00 pm, ESPN3 | | Southern | W 85–62 | 8–3 | 26 – Manns | 8 – Manns | 5 – Ash | Nutter Center (3,012); Fairborn, OH |
| December 17, 2019*; 7:00 pm, ESPN+ | | Mississippi Valley State | W 92–50 | 9–3 | 19 – Tied | 14 – Basile | 7 – Hall | Nutter Center (2,773); Fairborn, OH |
| December 21, 2019*; 2:00 pm, ESPN+ | | at Toledo | W 79–72 | 10–3 | 27 – Holden | 17 – Holden | 3 – Love | Savage Arena (4,038); Toledo, OH |
Horizon League regular season
| December 28, 2019; 2:00 pm, ESPN+ | | Green Bay | W 90–84 | 11–3 (1–0) | 22 – Love | 16 – Love | 4 – Tied | Nutter Center (4,089); Fairborn, OH |
| December 30, 2019; 7:00 pm, ESPN3 | | Milwaukee | W 82–70 | 12–3 (2–0) | 17 – Wampler | 9 – Love | 8 – Hall | Nutter Center (3,470); Fairborn, OH |
| January 3, 2020; 7:00 pm, ESPNU | | at Oakland | W 96–69 | 13–3 (3–0) | 21 – Wampler | 9 – Ash | 7 – Gentry | Athletics Center O'rena (3,393); Auburn Hills, MI |
| January 5, 2020; 1:00 pm, ESPN+ | | at Detroit Mercy | W 70–69 | 14–3 (4–0) | 23 – Love | 20 – Love | 3 – Tied | Calihan Hall (1,103); Detroit, MI |
| January 10, 2020; 7:00 pm, ESPN3 | | at IUPUI | W 84–70 | 15–3 (5–0) | 26 – Wampler | 15 – Love | 7 – Holden | Indiana Farmers Coliseum (1,142); Indianapolis, IN |
| January 12, 2020; 3:15 pm, ESPN+ | | at UIC | L 72–76 | 15–4 (5–1) | 16 – Wampler | 11 – Love | 3 – Tied | Credit Union 1 Arena (1,277); Chicago, IL |
| January 16, 2020; 7:00 pm, ESPN+ | | Cleveland State | W 75–62 | 16–4 (6–1) | 16 – Holden | 10 – Basile | 4 – Ash | Nutter Center (3,153); Fairborn, OH |
| January 18, 2020; 7:00 pm, ESPN+ | | Youngstown State | W 79–72 | 17–4 (7–1) | 21 – Love | 13 – Holden | 4 – Gentry | Nutter Center (5,474); Fairborn, OH |
| January 24, 2020; 9:00 pm, ESPNU | | Northern Kentucky | W 95–63 | 18–4 (8–1) | 20 – Holden | 13 – Holden | 6 – Wampler | Nutter Center (6,217); Fairborn, OH |
| January 31, 2020; 7:00 pm, ESPN3 | | at Milwaukee | W 65–61 | 19–4 (9–1) | 19 – Wampler | 13 – Love | 2 – Gentry | UW–Milwaukee Panther Arena (2,120); Milwaukee, WI |
| February 2, 2020; 2:00 pm, ESPN+ | | at Green Bay | L 89–92 | 19–5 (9–2) | 21 – Love | 11 – Ash | 7 – Gentry | Resch Center (1,990); Ashwaubenon, WI |
| February 6, 2020; 7:00 pm, ESPN+ | | Detroit Mercy | W 98–86 | 20–5 (10–2) | 25 – Wampler | 6 – Love | 6 – Holden | Nutter Center (4,344); Fairborn, OH |
| February 8, 2020; 7:00 pm, ESPN+ | | Oakland | W 83–71 | 21–5 (11–2) | 20 – Wampler | 11 – Love | 6 – Gentry | Nutter Center (5,053); Fairborn, OH |
| February 14, 2020; 9:00 pm, ESPN2 | | UIC | W 75–58 | 22–5 (12–2) | 24 – Love | 9 – Love | 3 – Calvin | Nutter Center (4,261); Fairborn, OH |
| February 16, 2020; 2:00 pm, ESPN+ | | IUPUI | W 106–66 | 23–5 (13–2) | 21 – Manns | 8 – Love | 5 – Tied | Nutter Center (6,003); Fairborn, OH |
| February 20, 2020; 7:00 pm, ESPN+ | | at Youngstown State | L 70–88 | 23–6 (13–3) | 17 – Love | 6 – Holden | 3 – Hall | Beeghly Center (2,148); Youngstown, OH |
| February 22, 2020; 3:00 pm, ESPN+ | | at Cleveland State | W 81–74 ^{OT} | 24–6 (14–3) | 23 – Wampler | 9 – Love | 4 – Wampler | Wolstein Center (2,159); Cleveland, OH |
| February 28, 2020; 7:00 pm, ESPNU | | at Northern Kentucky | W 64–62 | 25–6 (15–3) | 20 – Love | 14 – Love | 1 – Love | BB&T Arena (6,776); Highland Heights, KY |
Horizon League tournament
| March 9, 2020; 7:00 pm, ESPNU | (1) | vs. (4) UIC; Semifinals | L 56–73 | 25–7 | 14 – Wampler | 9 – Love | 4 – Gentry | Indiana Farmers Coliseum (1,923); Indianapolis, IN |
NIT
| | | | Cancelled due to COVID-19 | | | | | |
*Non-conference game. ^{#}Rankings from AP Poll. (#) Tournament seedings in parentheses. All times are in Eastern.

== Awards and honors ==
| Loudon Love | Horizon League Player of the Year |
| Loudon Love | First Team All Horizon League |
| Bill Wampler | Second Team All Horizon League |
| Cole Gentry | Third Team All Horizon League |
| Scott Nagy | Horizon League Coach of the Year |

== Statistics ==
| Number | Name | Games | Average | Points | Assists | Rebounds |
|---|---|---|---|---|---|---|
| 11 | Loudon Love | 27 | 15.9 | 429 | 39 | 261 |
| 1 | Bill Wampler | 31 | 15.6 | 483 | 51 | 140 |
| 2 | Tanner Holden | 32 | 11.8 | 378 | 51 | 207 |
| 31 | Cole Gentry | 32 | 10.8 | 346 | 87 | 87 |
| 00 | Jaylon Hall | 32 | 7.8 | 251 | 93 | 113 |
| 5 | Skyelar Potter | 9 | 6.4 | 58 | 8 | 28 |
| 21 | Grant Basile | 32 | 6.2 | 199 | 25 | 137 |
| 23 | James Manns | 25 | 5.7 | 142 | 4 | 44 |
| 10 | Trey Calvin | 32 | 4.8 | 153 | 32 | 67 |
| 3 | Jordan Ash | 32 | 4.0 | 129 | 52 | 91 |
| 20 | Andy Neff | 8 | 1.3 | 10 | 0 | 5 |
| 32 | TJ Nagy | 8 | 0.3 | 2 | 3 | 0 |
