= 2019–20 Cleveland State Vikings men's basketball team =

American college basketball season

2019–20 Cleveland State Vikings men's basketball
- Conference: Horizon League
- Record: 11–21 (7–11 Horizon)
- Head coach: Dennis Gates (1st season)
- Assistant coaches: Rob Summers; Dru Joyce III; Ryan Sharbaugh
- Home arena: Wolstein Center

2019–20 Horizon League men's basketball standings
	Conf.				Overall
Team	W		L	PCT	W		L	PCT
Wright State	15	–	3	.833	25	–	7	.781
Northern Kentucky †	13	–	5	.722	23	–	9	.719
Green Bay	11	–	7	.611	17	–	16	.515
Youngstown State	10	–	8	.556	18	–	15	.545
UIC	10	–	8	.556	18	–	17	.514
Oakland	8	–	10	.444	14	–	19	.424
Cleveland State	7	–	11	.389	11	–	21	.344
Milwaukee	7	–	11	.389	12	–	19	.387
Detroit Mercy*	6	–	12	.333	8	–	23	.258
IUPUI	3	–	15	.167	7	–	25	.219
† 2020 Horizon League Tournament winner * Ineligible for postseason due to APR violations

The 2019–20 Cleveland State Vikings men's basketball team represented Cleveland State University in the 2019–20 NCAA Division I men's basketball season. The Vikings, led by first-year head coach Dennis Gates, played their home games at the Wolstein Center in Cleveland, Ohio as members of the Horizon League. They finished the season 11–21, 7–11 in Horizon League play to finish in a tie for seventh place. They lost in the first round of the Horizon League tournament to Oakland.

== Previous season ==
The Vikings finished the 2018–19 season 10–21 overall, 5–13 in Horizon League play to finish in ninth place. In turn, they failed to qualify for the Horizon League tournament.

On July 12, 2019, it was announced that head coach Dennis Felton was relieved of his duties. On July 26, Dennis Gates was announced as the new head coach.

== Roster ==
2019–20 Cleveland State Vikings men's basketball team
Players
Coaches

Pos.	#	Name	Height	Weight	Year	Hometown
G	1	Tyrese Potoma	5 ft 11 in (1.8 m)	185 lb (84 kg)	So	Regina, Saskatchewan
G	2	Kasheem Thomas	6 ft 0 in (1.83 m)	185 lb (84 kg)	Sr	Montreal, Quebec, Canada
G	3	Craig Beaudion	6 ft 3 in (1.91 m)	170 lb (77 kg)	So	Chicago, Illinois
G	4	Franklyn Penn Jr.	6 ft 3 in (1.91 m)	190 lb (86 kg)	Jr	Hunthum's Ghut, British Virgin Islands
G	5	Tre Gomillion	6 ft 4 in (1.93 m)	215 lb (98 kg)	So	Augusta, Georgia
G	10	Hugo Ferreira	6 ft 1 in (1.85 m)	165 lb (75 kg)	Fr	Vila Nova de Gaia, Portugal
G	11	Liam Doup	6 ft 1 in (1.85 m)	170 lb (77 kg)	So	Lakewood, Ohio
F	12	Algevon Eichelberger	6 ft 8 in (2.03 m)	250 lb (113 kg)	Jr	Saginaw, Michigan
G/F	14	Anthony Rego	6 ft 5 in (1.96 m)	170 lb (77 kg)	Fr	Westlake, Ohio
F	15	Daylen Williams	6 ft 8 in (2.03 m)	195 lb (88 kg)	Fr	Los Angeles, California
G	20	Aria Eskandari	6 ft 3 in (1.91 m)	190 lb (86 kg)	So	Sanford, Florida
G	21	Jeremy Sanchez	6 ft 0 in (1.83 m)	170 lb (77 kg)	Fr	North Ridgeville, Ohio
F	22	Jaalam Hill	6 ft 7 in (2.01 m)	225 lb (102 kg)	Sr	Louisville, Kentucky
F	24	Torrey Patton	6 ft 5 in (1.96 m)	195 lb (88 kg)	Jr	Dayton, Ohio
F	33	Jalen Williams	6 ft 8 in (2.03 m)	240 lb (109 kg)	Sr	Greenville, South Carolina
F	35	Deante Johnson	6 ft 9 in (2.06 m)	210 lb (95 kg)	So	Detroit, Michigan

Head coach

- Dennis Gates (California)

Assistant coach(es)

- Rob Summers (West Virginia)
- Dru Joyce III (Akron)
- Ryan Sharbaugh (Westminster)

Legend

- (C) Team captain
- (S) Suspended
- (I) Ineligible
- (W) Walk-on
- Injured
- Current redshirt

Roster
Last update: January 27, 2020

== Schedule and results ==
Date time, TV	Rank^{#}	Opponent^{#}	Result	Record	Site (attendance) city, state
Exhibition
October 30, 2019*; 7:00 pm		Notre Dame (OH)	L 64–69	–	Wolstein Center; Cleveland, OH
Non-conference regular season
November 5, 2019*; 8:00 pm, BTN Pluss		at Minnesota	L 50–85	0–1	Williams Arena (8,693); Minneapolis, MN
November 9, 2019*; 3:30 pm		Edinboro	W 79–54	1–1	Wolstein Center (3,533); Cleveland, OH
November 12, 2019*; 8:00 pm		at Missouri State	L 53–73	1–2	JQH Arena (3,800); Springfield, MO
November 15, 2019*; 7:00 pm, SECN+		at South Carolina	L 63–90	1–3	Colonial Life Arena (10,083); Columbia, SC
November 19, 2019*; 7:00 pm, ESPN+		FIU; D.C. Classic	L 61–107	1–4	Wolstein Center (1,524); Cleveland, OH
November 22, 2019*; 1:00 pm, FloSports		vs. UNC Wilmington; D.C. Classic	W 47–46	2–4	Entertainment and Sports Arena (512); Washington, D.C.
November 23, 2019*; 3:30 pm, FloSports		vs. Eastern Kentucky; D.C. Classic	W 65–51	3–4	Entertainment and Sports Arena (739); Washington, D.C.
November 30, 2019*; 6:00 pm		Robert Morris	W 70–59	4–4	Wolstein Center (1,031); Cleveland, OH
December 4, 2019*; 7:00 pm, ESPN+		Toledo	L 65–80	4–5	Wolstein Center (1,683); Cleveland, OH
December 7, 2019*; 7:00 pm, ESPN+		at Kent State	L 59–81	4–6	MAC Center (2,176); Kent, OH
December 15, 2019*; 12:00 pm, ESPN+		at Bowling Green	L 58–72	4–7	Stroh Center (1,725); Bowling Green, OH
December 18, 2019*; 7:00 pm, ESPN3		DePaul	L 65–73	4–8	Wolstein Center (991); Cleveland, OH
December 21, 2019*; 4:00, ESPN3		at East Tennessee State	L 55–80	4–9	Freedom Hall Civic Center (6,149); Johnson City, TN
Horizon League regular season
December 28, 2019; 4:00 pm, ESPN+		at UIC	L 66–71	4–10 (0–1)	Credit Union 1 Arena (1,489); Chicago, IL
December 30, 2019; 2:00 pm, ESPN+		at IUPUI	W 82–80	5–10 (1–1)	Indiana Farmers Coliseum (889); Indianapolis, IN
January 4, 2020; 3:00 pm, ESPN3		Youngstown State	W 82–74	6–10 (2–1)	Wolstein Center (1,537); Cleveland, OH
January 9, 2020; 7:00 pm, ESPN+		Detroit Mercy	W 64–59	7–10 (3–1)	Wolstein Center (973); Cleveland, OH
January 11, 2020; 3:00 pm, ESPN3		Oakland	L 55–68	7–11 (3–2)	Wolstein Center (1,561); Cleveland, OH
January 16, 2020; 7:00 pm, ESPN+		at Wright State	L 65–72	7–12 (3–3)	Nutter Center (3,153); Fairborn, OH
January 18, 2020; 7:00 pm, ESPN+		at Northern Kentucky	L 49–75	7–13 (3–4)	BB&T Arena (4,390); Highland Heights, KY
January 23, 2020; 7:00 pm, ESPN3		Green Bay	L 74–78	7–14 (3–5)	Wolstein Center (1,033); Cleveland, OH
January 25, 2020; 3:00 pm, ESPN3		Milwaukee	W 70–53	8–14 (4–5)	Wolstein Center (1,062); Cleveland, OH
January 30, 2020; 7:00 pm, ESPN+		IUPUI	W 72–62	9–14 (5–5)	Wolstein Center (1,241); Cleveland, OH
February 1, 2020; 3:00 pm, ESPN3		UIC	L 62–64	9–15 (5–6)	Wolstein Center (1,170); Cleveland, OH
February 8, 2020; 6:00 pm, ESPN+		at Youngstown State	L 55–67	9–16 (5–7)	Beeghly Center (3,298); Youngstown, OH
February 13, 2020; 7:00 pm, ESPN+		at Oakland	L 74–79	9–17 (5–8)	Athletics Center O'rena (2,919); Auburn Hills, MI
February 15, 2020; 1:00 pm, ESPN+		at Detroit Mercy	W 67–66 ^{OT}	10–17 (6–8)	Calihan Hall (1,274); Detroit, MI
February 20, 2020; 7:00 pm, ESPN+		Northern Kentucky	L 59–73	10–18 (6–9)	Wolstein Center (1,508); Cleveland, OH
February 22, 2020; 3:00 pm, ESPN+		Wright State	L 74–81 ^{OT}	10–19 (6–10)	Wolstein Center (2,159); Cleveland, OH
February 27, 2020; 8:00 pm, ESPN+		at Milwaukee	W 70–68	11–19 (7–10)	UW–Milwaukee Panther Arena (1,462); Milwaukee, WI
February 29, 2020; 8:00 pm, ESPN+		at Green Bay	L 67–74	11–20 (7–11)	Kress Events Center (3,369); Green Bay, WI
Horizon League tournament
March 3, 2020; 7:00 pm, ESPN+	(7)	at (6) Oakland; First round	L 59–80	11–21	Athletics Center O'rena (2,982); Auburn Hills, MI
*Non-conference game. ^{#}Rankings from AP Poll. (#) Tournament seedings in parentheses. All times are in Eastern.
