= Byron Rimm II =

American basketball coach

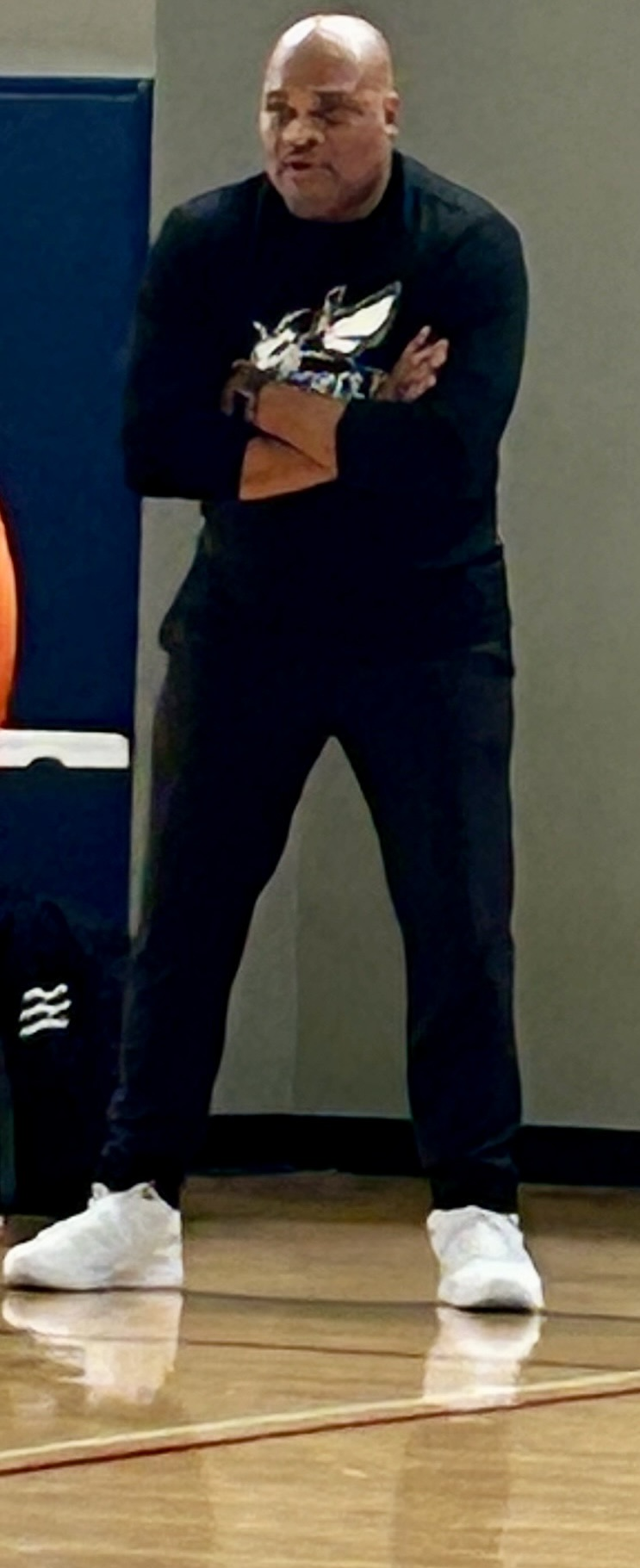

Current position
- Title: Head coach
- Team: Dallas College Eastfield
- Conference: NJCAA

Biographical details
- Born: January 31, 1974 (age 52); Pensacola, Florida, U.S.

Playing career
- 1994–1996: Ventura
- 1996–1997: Cal State Los Angeles
- Position: Guard

Coaching career (HC unless noted)
- 1997–1999: Pasadena CC (assistant)
- 1999–2000: Chaffey (assistant)
- 2000–2001: Cal State San Bernardino (assistant)
- 2001–2002: Texas College (women's)
- 2002–2005: Jarvis Christian
- 2005–2006: Prairie View A&M (assistant)
- 2006–2016: Prairie View A&M
- 2016–2017: Texas A&M–Corpus Christi (dir. of operations)
- 2017–2018: UC Riverside (assistant)
- 2018–2019: IUPUI (assoc. HC)
- 2019–2021: IUPUI
- 2021–2023: Houston Baptist/Houston Christian (assistant)
- 2023-2024: Gulf Coast Blue Chips 16U UAA Head Coach
- 2024-2025: Gulf Coast Blue Chips 17U UAA Head Coach
- 2024–present: Dallas College Eastfield

Head coaching record
- Overall: 197–278

Byron Newton Rimm II (born January 31, 1974) is an American college basketball coach, more recently the interim head men's basketball coach at IUPUI.

== Early life and education ==
Rimm was born in Pensacola, Florida and graduated from Wade Hampton High School in Greenville, South Carolina in 1993.

From 1994 to 1996, Rimm played junior college basketball at Ventura College in Ventura, California; he was part of the 1996 California Community College Athletic Association championship team at Ventura. Rimm then transferred to California State University, Los Angeles, where he averaged 4.7 points, 1.1 rebounds, and 0.7 assists in 19 games in 1996–97.

In 1999, Rimm completed his bachelor's degree in liberal studies at Cal State Los Angeles.

== Coaching career ==
While completing his studies at Cal State Los Angeles, Rimm served as a junior college basketball assistant coach, first at Pasadena City College in 1997 then at Chaffey College.

Rimm was men's basketball head coach at Prairie View A&M from the 2006–07 season until resigning on January 27, 2016.

On October 12, 2016, Texas A&M–Corpus Christi men's basketball head coach Willis Wilson hired Rimm as director of basketball operations.

On July 31, 2017, Rimm was hired as assistant coach at UC Riverside.

On November 14, 2018, Rimm was hired by IUPUI as associate head coach under Jason Gardner. On August 28, 2019, he was named interim head coach of IUPUI for the 2019-20 season after Gardner's resignation stemming from an arrest for operating a vehicle while intoxicated. On June 11, 2020, due to the ongoing COVID-19 pandemic, which forced the school to shut down their coaching search, IUPUI announced that Rimm would be retained for at least the 2020-21 season.

On March 8, 2023, Rimm was hired as head coach of the Gulf Coast Blue Chips UAA 16U team for the 2023–2024 season, leading the squad to an 11–2 record in circuit play. The following year, he transitioned to coach the 17U team in the 2024–2025 season, guiding them to an 8–5 record highlighted by a late-season surge that secured a berth in the UAA finals.

Throughout his tenure, Rimm's teams competed vigorously against nationally ranked programs, providing significant exposure for his players to collegiate recruiters and contributing to their development both on and off the court.

On November 1, 2024, Riimm was hired as Head Coach of Dallas College Eastfield MBB.

== Coaching achievements and milestones ==
=== Texas College (Women's) – 2001–02 ===
In one season as head coach, he led the team to a 20–12 record, the best in the program’s history up to that point. Prairie View A&M University AthleticsCoaches Database

=== Jarvis Christian College – Early 2000s ===
Guided the Bulldogs to:

- A second-place finish in the Red River Athletic Conference.
- Their first NAIA National Tournament appearance in over three decades.
- Earned co-Coach of the Year honors, and two players received All-Conference recognition. Prairie View A&M University Athletics

=== Became the all-time winningest coach in program history, with 115 victories. ===
Dallas College Eastfield Houston Christian University Athletics Coaches Database

- SWAC Tournament Finals Appearances: Led the team to back-to-back appearances in the Southwest Athletic Conference (SWAC) tournament championship games during the 2012–13 and 2013–14 seasons. IU Indy AthleticsWikipedia+1
  - In 2012–13, Prairie View A&M made it to the SWAC championship game. Wikipedia
  - In 2013–14, they again reached the tournament final. Wikipedia
- Additional highlights under his tenure:
  - 2008–09: Best record since 2002–03 (17–16), third in SWAC, and advanced to the second round of the SWAC tournament—a rare achievement at the time. Prairie View A&M University AthleticsDallas College Eastfield
  - 2010–11 Third consecutive SWAC tournament appearance and the top-ranked offensive rebounding team in the conference. Prairie View A&M University Athletics IU Indy Athletics
- 2014–15: Achieved a seven-game winning streak—the program's longest since the 1972–73 season. Also led the team to another SWAC tournament appearance. Prairie View A&M University AthleticsDallas College Eastfield
- He also helped elevate the team’s academic performance: Prairie View posted its highest-ever APR (Academic Progress Report) score with a 944 rating. Prairie View A&M University Athletics

=== IUPUI – 2019–21 ===
Led the team as interim head coach in the 2019–20 season.

Under his leadership, guard Marcus Burk earned All-Horizon League honors and declared for the NBA draft, and forward Elyjah Goss made the All-Defensive Team and set a program single-season rebound record. IU Indy Athletics

== Head coaching record ==
Record table
Season	Team	Overall	Conference	Standing	Postseason
Texas College Steers (Red River Athletic Conference) (2001–2002)
2001–02	Texas College	20–12			Ineligible
Jarvis Christian Bulldogs (Red River Athletic Conference) (2002–2005)
2002–03	Jarvis Christian	16–15	14–6	2nd	
2003–04	Jarvis Christian	16–13	13–9	4th	
2004–05	Jarvis Christian	10–20	10–12	7th	
Jarvis Christian:		47–39	37–27		
Prairie View A&M Panthers (Southwestern Athletic Conference) (2006–2016)
2006–07	Prairie View A&M	8–22	6–12	9th	
2007–08	Prairie View A&M	8–22	6–12	8th	
2008–09	Prairie View A&M	17–16	12–6	3rd	
2009–10	Prairie View A&M	16–14	11–7	4th	
2010–11	Prairie View A&M	10–22	7–11	7th	
2011–12	Prairie View A&M	14–18	10–8	4th	
2012–13	Prairie View A&M	15–19	8–10	5th	
2013–14	Prairie View A&M	11–23	6–12	8th	
2014–15	Prairie View A&M	15–18	12–6	4th	
2015–16	Prairie View A&M	1–18	1–6	(resigned)	
Prairie View A&M:		115–192	79–90		
IUPUI Jaguars (Horizon League) (2019–2021)
2019–20	IUPUI	7–25	3–15	10th	
2020–21	IUPUI	8–10	7–9	9th	
IUPUI:		15–35	10–24		
Total:		197–278			
