= 2019–20 Green Bay Phoenix men's basketball team =

American college basketball season

2019–20 Green Bay Phoenix men's basketball
- Conference: Horizon League
- Record: 17–16 (11–7 Horizon)
- Head coach: Linc Darner (5th season)
- Associate head coach: Randall Herbst
- Assistant coaches: Richard Davis; Ben Swank
- Home arena: Resch Center; Kress Events Center

2019–20 Horizon League men's basketball standings
	Conf.				Overall
Team	W		L	PCT	W		L	PCT
Wright State	15	–	3	.833	25	–	7	.781
Northern Kentucky †	13	–	5	.722	23	–	9	.719
Green Bay	11	–	7	.611	17	–	16	.515
Youngstown State	10	–	8	.556	18	–	15	.545
UIC	10	–	8	.556	18	–	17	.514
Oakland	8	–	10	.444	14	–	19	.424
Cleveland State	7	–	11	.389	11	–	21	.344
Milwaukee	7	–	11	.389	12	–	19	.387
Detroit Mercy*	6	–	12	.333	8	–	23	.258
IUPUI	3	–	15	.167	7	–	25	.219
† 2020 Horizon League Tournament winner * Ineligible for postseason due to APR violations

The 2019–20 Green Bay Phoenix men's basketball team represented the University of Wisconsin–Green Bay in the 2019–20 NCAA Division I men's basketball season. The Phoenix, led by fifth-year head coach Linc Darner, played their home games at the Resch Center in Ashwaubenon, Wisconsin and the Kress Events Center in Green Bay, Wisconsin as members of the Horizon League. They finished the season 17–16, 11–7 in Horizon League play to finish in third place. They defeated Oakland in the quarterfinals of the Horizon League tournament before losing in the semifinals to Northern Kentucky.

On May 17, 2020, head coach Linc Darner was fired. He finished at Green Bay with a five-year record of 92–80.

== Previous season ==
The Phoenix finished the 2018–19 season 21–17 overall, 10–8 in Horizon League play to finish in a tie for fourth place. In the Horizon League tournament, they defeated UIC in the quarterfinals, before falling to top seeded Wright State in the semifinals. They received an invitation to the CIT, where they defeated East Tennessee State in the first round, FIU in the second round, Cal State Bakersfield in the quarterfinals, Texas Southern in the semifinals, before falling to Marshall in the championship game.

== Roster ==
2019–20 Green Bay Phoenix men's basketball team
Players
Coaches

Pos.	#	Name	Height	Weight	Year	Hometown
G	0	Josh Jefferson	6 ft 2 in (1.88 m)	190 lb (86 kg)	RS Jr	New Albany, Indiana
G	1	Amari Davis	6 ft 3 in (1.91 m)	170 lb (77 kg)	Fr	Trotwood, Ohio
G	2	PJ Pipes	6 ft 2 in (1.88 m)	190 lb (86 kg)	Jr	Woodridge, Illinois
G	3	Japannah Kellogg III	6 ft 8 in (2.03 m)	190 lb (86 kg)	Fr	Ames, Iowa
G	4	Jiovanni Miles	6 ft 2 in (1.88 m)	190 lb (86 kg)	Fr	Novi, Michigan
G	5	Lucas Stieber	6 ft 3 in (1.91 m)	185 lb (84 kg)	Fr	Green Bay, Wisconsin
F	10	ShanQuan Hemphill	6 ft 6 in (1.98 m)	190 lb (86 kg)	Sr	Gary, Indiana
G	11	JayQuan McCloud	6 ft 2 in (1.88 m)	195 lb (88 kg)	RS Sr	North Chicago, Illinois
F	12	Josh McNair	6 ft 6 in (1.98 m)	200 lb (91 kg)	Sr	Thornton, Colorado
G	13	Trevian Bell	6 ft 7 in (2.01 m)	205 lb (93 kg)	Jr	Joliet, Illinois
F	15	Manny Patterson	6 ft 8 in (2.03 m)	220 lb (100 kg)	Jr	Chicago, Illinois
G	21	Kameron Hankerson	6 ft 5 in (1.96 m)	200 lb (91 kg)	Sr	Novi, Michigan
G	30	Hunter Crist	6 ft 3 in (1.91 m)	190 lb (86 kg)	Jr	Cicero, Illinois
G	33	Cody Schwartz	6 ft 9 in (2.06 m)	220 lb (100 kg)	RS Sr	De Pere, Wisconsin
F	34	Will Chevalier	6 ft 9 in (2.06 m)	240 lb (109 kg)	RS So	Kimberly, Wisconsin

Head coach

- Linc Darner (Purdue)

Assistant coach(es)

- Randall Herbst (Waldorf)
- Richard Davis (Ashland)
- Ben Swank (Edinboro)

Legend

- (C) Team captain
- (S) Suspended
- (I) Ineligible
- (W) Walk-on
- Injured
- Current redshirt

Roster
Last update: October 16, 2019

== Schedule and results ==
Date time, TV	Rank^{#}	Opponent^{#}	Result	Record	Site (attendance) city, state
Exhibition
October 28, 2019*; 7:00 pm		St. Norbert	W 79–72		Kress Events Center; Green Bay, WI
Non-conference regular season
November 6, 2019*; 6:00 pm, BTN		at No. 23 Purdue	L 57–79	0–1	Mackey Arena (14,804); West Lafayette, IN
November 9, 2019*; 6:00 pm, ESPN3		UW–Stout	W 115–64	1–1	Kress Events Center (1,541); Green Bay, WI
November 13, 2019*; 8:00 pm		at New Mexico; Legends Classic campus-site game	L 78–93	1–2	The Pit (10,137); Albuquerque, NM
November 21, 2019*; 8:00 pm, BTN		at Wisconsin; Legends Classic campus-site game	L 70–88	1–3	Kohl Center (16,837); Madison, WI
November 25, 2019*; 7:00 pm		Cal State Northridge; Legends Classic campus-site game	W 85–84	2–3	Kress Events Center (1,436); Green Bay, WI
November 26, 2019*; 7:00 pm		Colgate; Legends Classic campus-site game	L 81–99	2–4	Kress Events Center (1,342); Green Bay, WI
November 30, 2019*; 7:00 pm		at Montana State	W 98–72	3–4	Brick Breeden Fieldhouse (3,023); Bozeman, MT
December 4, 2019*; 6:00 pm, FS2		at Xavier	L 71–84	3–5	Cintas Center (10,129); Cincinnati, OH
December 7, 2019*; 3:15 pm, ESPN+		at Eastern Illinois	L 80–93	3–6	Lantz Arena (1,488); Charleston, IL
December 10, 2019*; 7:00 pm, ESPN3		at UCF	L 66–79	3–7	Addition Financial Arena (4,370); Orlando, FL
December 14, 2019*; 6:00 pm, ESPN+		Evansville	L 62–72	3–8	Resch Center (1,924); Ashwaubenon, WI
December 18, 2019*; 7:00 pm, ESPN3		Concordia–Chicago	W 126–64	4–8	Kress Events Center; Green Bay, WI
December 21, 2019*; 1:00 pm, ESPN+		at Northern Illinois	W 85–84	5–8	Convocation Center (1,123); DeKalb, IL
Horizon League regular season
December 28, 2019; 1:00 pm, ESPN+		at Wright State	L 84–90	5–9 (0–1)	Nutter Center (4,089); Fairborn, OH
December 30, 2019; 6:00 pm, ESPN+		at Northern Kentucky	W 73–59	6–9 (1–1)	BB&T Arena (3,127); Highland Heights, KY
January 3, 2020; 7:00 pm, ESPN3		UIC	W 85–71	7–9 (2–1)	Resch Center (2,124); Ashwaubenon, WI
January 5, 2020; 1:00 pm, ESPN+		IUPUI	L 78–93	7–10 (2–2)	Resch Center (1,666); Ashwaubenon, WI
January 11, 2020; 6:00 pm, ESPN+		Milwaukee	L 80–87	7–11 (2–3)	Resch Center (2,494); Ashwaubenon, WI
January 16, 2020; 7:00 pm, ESPN+		Oakland	W 73–69	8–11 (3–3)	Resch Center (1,232); Ashwaubenon, WI
January 18, 2020; 12:00 pm, ESPN+		Detroit Mercy	W 83–80	9–11 (4–3)	Resch Center (1,937); Ashwaubenon, WI
January 23, 2020; 6:00 pm, ESPN3		at Cleveland State	W 78–74	10–11 (5–3)	Wolstein Center (1,033); Cleveland, OH
January 25, 2020; 1:00 pm, ESPN+		at Youngstown State	L 94–98 ^{OT}	10–12 (5–4)	Beeghly Center (2,790); Youngstown, OH
January 31, 2020; 9:00 pm, ESPNU		Northern Kentucky	L 62–71	10–13 (5–5)	Kress Events Center (1,885); Green Bay, WI
February 2, 2020; 1:00 pm, ESPN+		Wright State	W 92–89	11–13 (6–5)	Resch Center (1,990); Ashwaubenon, WI
February 6, 2020; 10:00 am, ESPN+		at IUPUI	W 91–85	12–13 (7–5)	Indiana Farmers Coliseum (2,394); Indianapolis, IN
February 8, 2020; 3:00 pm, ESPN3		at UIC	L 58–71	12–14 (7–6)	Credit Union 1 Arena (2,704); Chicago, IL
February 15, 2020; 6:00 pm, ESPN+		at Milwaukee	W 94–90	13–14 (8–6)	UW–Milwaukee Panther Arena (2,246); Milwaukee, WI
February 21, 2020; 6:00 pm, ESPN+		at Detroit Mercy	W 84–67	14–14 (9–6)	Calihan Hall (1,211); Detroit, MI
February 23, 2020; 2:00 pm, ESPN+		at Oakland	L 88–92 ^{OT}	14–15 (9–7)	Athletics Center O'rena (3,869); Auburn Hills, MI
February 27, 2020; 7:00 pm, ESPN+		Youngstown State	W 102–92	15–15 (10–7)	Resch Center (2,217); Ashwaubenon, WI
February 29, 2020; 7:00 pm, ESPN+		Cleveland State	W 74–67	16–15 (11–7)	Kress Events Center (3,369); Green Bay, WI
Horizon League tournament
March 5, 2020; 7:00 pm, ESPN+	(3)	(6) Oakland; Quarterfinals	W 78–63	17–15	Resch Center (2,439); Ashwaubenon, WI
March 9, 2020; 9:30 pm, ESPN2	(3)	vs. (2) Northern Kentucky; Semifinals	L 69–80	17–16	Indiana Farmers Coliseum (1,923); Indianapolis, IN
*Non-conference game. ^{#}Rankings from AP Poll. (#) Tournament seedings in parentheses. All times are in Central.
