= 2019–20 Youngstown State Penguins men's basketball team =

American college basketball season

2019–20 Youngstown State Penguins men's basketball
- Conference: Horizon League
- Record: 18–15 (10–8 Horizon)
- Head coach: Jerrod Calhoun (3rd season)
- Associate head coach: Jason Slay
- Assistant coaches: Ethan Faulkner; Chinedu Nwachukwu
- Home arena: Beeghly Center

2019–20 Horizon League men's basketball standings
	Conf.				Overall
Team	W		L	PCT	W		L	PCT
Wright State	15	–	3	.833	25	–	7	.781
Northern Kentucky †	13	–	5	.722	23	–	9	.719
Green Bay	11	–	7	.611	17	–	16	.515
Youngstown State	10	–	8	.556	18	–	15	.545
UIC	10	–	8	.556	18	–	17	.514
Oakland	8	–	10	.444	14	–	19	.424
Cleveland State	7	–	11	.389	11	–	21	.344
Milwaukee	7	–	11	.389	12	–	19	.387
Detroit Mercy*	6	–	12	.333	8	–	23	.258
IUPUI	3	–	15	.167	7	–	25	.219
† 2020 Horizon League Tournament winner * Ineligible for postseason due to APR violations

The 2019–20 Youngstown State Penguins men's basketball team represented Youngstown State University in the 2019–20 NCAA Division I men's basketball season. The Penguins, led by third-year head coach Jerrod Calhoun, played their home games at the Beeghly Center in Youngstown, Ohio as members of the Horizon League. They finished the season 18–15, 10–8 in Horizon League play to finish in a tie for fourth place. They defeated Milwaukee in the first round of the Horizon League tournament before losing in the quarterfinals to UIC. They accepted and invitation to the CollegeIndsider.com Tournament. However, the CIT, and all other postseason tournaments, were cancelled amid the COVID-19 pandemic.

== Previous season ==
The Penguins finished the 2018–19 season 12–20 overall, 8–10 in Horizon League play, to finish in a four-way tie for sixth place. In the Horizon League tournament, they were defeated by Oakland in the quarterfinals.

== Roster ==
2019–20 Youngstown State Penguins men's basketball team
Players
Coaches

Pos.	#	Name	Height	Weight	Year	Hometown
G	0	Tyler Foster	6 ft 5 in (1.96 m)	200 lb (91 kg)	So	Baltimore, Maryland
F	1	Jamir Thomas	6 ft 8 in (2.03 m)	264 lb (120 kg)	Jr	Passaic, New Jersey
G	2	Jelani Simmons	6 ft 5 in (1.96 m)	198 lb (90 kg)	So	Columbus, Ohio
G	3	Darius Quisenberry	6 ft 1 in (1.85 m)	188 lb (85 kg)	So	Springfield, Ohio
G	4	Kenny Ganley, Jr.	6 ft 4 in (1.93 m)	195 lb (88 kg)	Fr	Brecksville, Ohio
G	5	Christian Bentley	6 ft 3 in (1.91 m)	200 lb (91 kg)	Jr	Brampton, Ontario, Canada
G	11	Daniel Ogoro	6 ft 5 in (1.96 m)	207 lb (94 kg)	Fr	London, England
G	13	Donel Cathcart	6 ft 5 in (1.96 m)	200 lb (91 kg)	Sr	Buffalo, New York
G	20	Geoff Hamperian	6 ft 4 in (1.93 m)	205 lb (93 kg)	So	Morgantown, West Virginia
G	22	Devin Morgan	5 ft 10 in (1.78 m)	200 lb (91 kg)	Sr	Chester, Virginia
F	23	Olamide Pedersen	6 ft 9 in (2.06 m)	225 lb (102 kg)	So	Brønshøj, Denmark
F	25	Mohamed Konate	6 ft 4 in (1.93 m)	205 lb (93 kg)	So	Bamako, Mali
F	31	Michael Akuchie	6 ft 8 in (2.03 m)	218 lb (99 kg)	Jr	Plantation, Florida
G	32	Garrett Covington	6 ft 5 in (1.96 m)	211 lb (96 kg)	Jr	Carmel, Indiana
F	33	Naz Bohannon	6 ft 6 in (1.98 m)	228 lb (103 kg)	Jr	Lorain, Ohio
G	34	Justin Bofenkamp	6 ft 0 in (1.83 m)	177 lb (80 kg)	So	Vienna, Ohio

Head coach

- Jerrod Calhoun (Cincinnati)

Assistant coach(es)

- Jason Slay (West Virginia State)
- Ethan Faulkner (Northern Kentucky)
- Chinedu Nwachukwu (Michigan)

Legend

- (C) Team captain
- (S) Suspended
- (I) Ineligible
- (W) Walk-on
- Injured
- Current redshirt

Roster
Last update: November 3, 2019

== Schedule and results ==
Date time, TV	Rank^{#}	Opponent^{#}	Result	Record	Site (attendance) city, state
Virgin Islands Tour
August 14, 2019*; 6:00 pm		vs. Calgary	W 74–71		Sports and Fitness Center; Saint Thomas, U.S. Virgin Islands
August 15, 2019*; 6:00 pm		vs. US Virgin Islands	W 90–82		Sports and Fitness Center; Saint Thomas, U.S. Virgin Islands
August 28, 2019*; 10:00 am		vs. Calgary	W 71–59		Sports and Fitness Center; Saint Thomas, U.S. Virgin Islands
Non-conference regular season
November 5, 2019*; 7:45 pm, ESPN3		Thiel	W 101–53	1–0	Beeghly Center (1,841); Youngstown, OH
November 10, 2019*; 2:00 pm, ACCRSN		at No. 5 Louisville; Global Sports Shootout	L 55–78	1–1	KFC Yum! Center (14,761); Louisville, KY
November 15, 2019*; 8:00 pm, ESPN+		at Louisiana	L 61–73	1–2	Cajundome (4,804); Lafayette, LA
November 19, 2019*; 7:00 pm, ESPN+		North Carolina Central; Global Sports Shootout	W 66–60	2–2	Beeghly Center (1,564); Youngstown, OH
November 21, 2019*; 7:00 pm		at Akron; Global Sports Shootout	L 60–82	2–3	James A. Rhodes Arena (2,214); Akron, OH
November 23, 2019*; 2:00 pm		at USC Upstate; Global Sports Shootout	W 66–61	3–3	G. B. Hodge Center (564); Spartanburg, SC
November 27, 2019*; 7:00 pm, ESPN3		Westminster (PA)	W 93–67	4–3	Beeghly Center (1,746); Youngstown, OH
November 30, 2019*; 4:30 pm, ESPN+		at Central Michigan	L 72–88	4–4	McGuirk Arena (1,521); Mount Pleasant, MI
December 4, 2019*; 7:00 pm, ESPN3		Robert Morris	W 81–70	5–4	Beeghly Center (1,417); Youngstown, OH
December 7, 2019*; 2:00 pm		at Western Michigan	L 64–66	5–5	University Arena (1,658); Kalamazoo, MI
December 15, 2019*; 8:00 pm, ESPN+		Southeast Missouri State	W 65–50	6–5	Beeghly Center (1,243); Youngstown, OH
December 18, 2019*; 7:45 pm, ESPN+		Binghamton	W 73–55	7–5	Beeghly Center (1,988); Youngstown, OH
December 21, 2019*; 1:00 pm		No. 25 West Virginia	L 64–75	7–6	Covelli Centre (3,614); Youngstown, OH
Horizon League regular season
December 28, 2019; 12:00 pm, ESPN+		at IUPUI	W 83–73	8–6 (1–0)	Indiana Farmers Coliseum (868); Indianapolis, IN
December 30, 2019; 7:00 pm, ESPN+		at UIC	W 70–64	9–6 (2–0)	Credit Union 1 Arena (1,210); Chicago, IL
January 4, 2020; 3:00 pm, ESPN3		at Cleveland State	L 74–82	9–7 (2–1)	Wolstein Center; Cleveland, OH
January 9, 2020; 7:00 pm, ESPN3		Oakland	W 61–60	10–7 (3–1)	Beeghly Center (2,815); Youngstown, OH
January 11, 2020; 2:00 pm, ESPN+		Detroit Mercy	W 69–67	11–7 (4–1)	Beeghly Center (2,510); Youngstown, OH
January 16, 2020; 7:00 pm, ESPN+		at Northern Kentucky	L 63–88	11–8 (4–2)	BB&T Arena (3,232); Highland Heights, KY
January 18, 2020; 7:00 pm, ESPN3		at Wright State	L 72–79	11–9 (4–3)	Nutter Center (5,474); Fairborn, OH
January 23, 2020; 7:00 pm, ESPN+		Milwaukee	L 73–75 ^{OT}	11–10 (4–4)	Beeghly Center (1,712); Youngstown, OH
January 25, 2020; 2:00 pm, ESPN+		Green Bay	W 98–94 ^{OT}	12–10 (5–4)	Beeghly Center (2,798); Youngstown, OH
January 30, 2020; 7:00 pm, ESPN+		UIC	L 83–90 ^{OT}	12–11 (5–5)	Beeghly Center (1,596); Youngstown, OH
February 1, 2020; 6:00 pm, ESPN3		IUPUI	W 91–76	13–11 (6–5)	Beeghly Center (4,633); Youngstown, OH
February 8, 2020; 6:00 pm, ESPN+		Cleveland State	W 67–55	14–11 (7–5)	Beeghly Center (3,298); Youngstown, OH
February 13, 2020; 7:00 pm, ESPN+		at Detroit Mercy	W 76–72	15–11 (8–5)	Calihan Hall (1,275); Detroit, MI
February 15, 2020; 3:00 pm, ESPN3		at Oakland	L 64–72	15–12 (8–6)	Athletics Center O'rena (3,488); Auburn Hills, MI
February 20, 2020; 7:00 pm, ESPN+		Wright State	W 88–70	16–12 (9–6)	Beeghly Center (2,148); Youngstown, OH
February 22, 2020; 2:00 pm, ESPN+		Northern Kentucky	L 59–61	16–13 (9–7)	Beeghly Center (4,213); Youngstown, OH
February 27, 2020; 8:00 pm, ESPN+		at Green Bay	L 92–102	16–14 (9–8)	Resch Center (2,217); Ashwaubenon, WI
February 29, 2020; 8:00 pm, ESPN+		at Milwaukee	W 73–69	17–14 (10–8)	UW–Milwaukee Panther Arena (2,198); Milwaukee, WI
Horizon League tournament
March 3, 2020; 7:00 pm, ESPN+	(5)	(8) Milwaukee; First round	W 63–57	18–14	Beeghly Center (2,110); Youngstown, OH
March 5, 2020; 7:00 pm, ESPN+	(5)	at (4) UIC; Quarterfinals	L 61–67	18–15	Credit Union 1 Arena (642); Chicago, IL
CIT
March 18, 2020; 7:00 pm, ESPN+/ESPN3		First round	Cancelled amid the COVID-19 pandemic		Beeghly Center; Youngstown, OH
*Non-conference game. ^{#}Rankings from AP Poll. (#) Tournament seedings in parentheses. All times are in Eastern.
