= Paul Corsaro =

American basketball coach (born 1989)

Ironi Ness Ziona
- Position: Head coach
- League: Israeli Basketball Premier League

Personal information
- Born: March 24, 1989 (age 37)
- Listed height: 6 ft 2 in (1.88 m)

Career history

Playing
- 2009–2012: Indianapolis

Coaching
- 2012–2016: Indianapolis (assistant)
- 2016–2018: Indianapolis (AHC)
- 2018–2020: Purdue Fort Wayne (assistant)
- 2020–2024: Indianapolis
- 2024–2025: IU Indy
- 2026–present: Ironi Ness Ziona

Career highlights
- GLVC Coach of the Year (2023); 2 GLVC Regular Season championships (2023, 2024)

Paul Gregory Corsaro (born March 24, 1989) is an American professional basketball coach for Ironi Ness Ziona in the Israeli Basketball Premier League. He played college football for the Youngstown State Penguins before transferring to play football and basketball for the Indianapolis Greyhounds. He later coached the Greyhounds and for the Purdue Fort Wayne Mastodons before joining IU Indianapolis.

He was the head coach of the IU Indy Jaguars until he was fired on May 13, 2025, for issues related to the treatment of players. Six former IU Indianapolis basketball players brought forth a lawsuit against him and the university on December 18, 2025, alleging physical and emotional abuse.

== Early life ==
Corsaro attended Roncalli High School in Indiana where he was a top basketball and football athlete, being named a first-team All-South basketball player as a senior while finishing as the basketball team's all-time leading scorer. He began his college career at Youngstown State University playing football in 2008, starting one game at quarterback that year.

Corsaro transferred to the University of Indianapolis in 2009 and played both football and basketball. He won three varsity letters and played with both teams from 2009 to 2012, although he missed his senior year of basketball due to injury. In 2010, with the football team, he set a program record for most rushing touchdowns by a quarterback in a season, with eight. He helped the football team reach their first NCAA playoff appearance in 2012. He was a guard in basketball and played quarterback in football from 2009 to 2010, before moving to playing defensive back for his last two seasons. Corsaro graduated in 2012 with a bachelor's degree in communications and later received a master's degree in business administration in 2014.

== Coaching career ==
Corsaro became a graduate assistant with the Indianapolis basketball program in 2012 and remained an assistant through 2016, when he was promoted to associate head coach. He helped Indianapolis have six consecutive winning seasons in his tenure. They also reached the NCAA tournament four straight times from 2013 to 2016 and had their first appearance in the Sweet Sixteen in 2014–15. He then served as an assistant coach for the Purdue Fort Wayne Mastodons from 2018 to 2020, as the team had 32 wins in two seasons.

Corsaro returned to Indianapolis in 2020 as head coach. He served four seasons in the position and helped the team compile a record of 79–37 during that time, which included two conference championships. He was the NABC Midwest Coach of the Year and the Great Lakes Valley Conference (GLVC) Coach of the Year for the 2022–23 season, in which he led the team to a program-record 26 wins and helped them have a top seed in the NCAA tournament.

In 2024, Corsaro left UIndy to become the head coach of the nearby Division I IUPUI Jaguars, which transferred to the new Indiana University Indianapolis as the IU Indy Jaguars after Indiana University–Purdue University Indianapolis split into two separate institutions at the end of the 2023–24 school year. He was later fired by the university for issues relating to alleged mistreatment of players; there is currently an ongoing lawsuit regarding this matter.

== Head coaching record ==
Record table
Season	Team	Overall	Conference	Standing	Postseason
Indianapolis Greyhounds (Great Lakes Valley Conference) (2020–2024)
2020–21	Indianapolis	11–12	10–11	8th	
2021–22	Indianapolis	19–11	10–8	6th	
2022–23	Indianapolis	26–5	17–3	1st	NCAA Division II Midwest Region Quarterfinal
2023–24	Indianapolis	23–9	17–3	1st	NCAA Division II Midwest Region Semifinal
Indianapolis:		79–37 (.681)	54–25 (.684)		
IU Indy Jaguars (Horizon League) (2024–2025)
2024–25	IU Indy	10–22	6–14	9th	
IU Indy:		10–22 (.313)	6–14 (.300)		
Total:		89–59 (.601)			
National champion Postseason invitational champion Conference regular season champion Conference regular season and conference tournament champion Division regular season champion Division regular season and conference tournament champion Conference tournament champion
