= 2019–20 Oakland Golden Grizzlies men's basketball team =

American college basketball season

2019–20 Oakland Golden Grizzlies men's basketball
- Conference: Horizon League
- Record: 14–19 (8–10 Horizon)
- Head coach: Greg Kampe (36th season)
- Associate head coach: Jeff Smith
- Assistant coaches: Tony Jones; Mychal Covington
- Home arena: Athletics Center O'rena

2019–20 Horizon League men's basketball standings
	Conf.				Overall
Team	W		L	PCT	W		L	PCT
Wright State	15	–	3	.833	25	–	7	.781
Northern Kentucky †	13	–	5	.722	23	–	9	.719
Green Bay	11	–	7	.611	17	–	16	.515
Youngstown State	10	–	8	.556	18	–	15	.545
UIC	10	–	8	.556	18	–	17	.514
Oakland	8	–	10	.444	14	–	19	.424
Cleveland State	7	–	11	.389	11	–	21	.344
Milwaukee	7	–	11	.389	12	–	19	.387
Detroit Mercy*	6	–	12	.333	8	–	23	.258
IUPUI	3	–	15	.167	7	–	25	.219
† 2020 Horizon League Tournament winner * Ineligible for postseason due to APR violations

The 2019–20 Oakland Golden Grizzlies men's basketball team represented Oakland University in the 2019–20 NCAA Division I men's basketball season. The Golden Grizzlies, led by 36th-year head coach Greg Kampe, played their home games at the Athletics Center O'rena in Auburn Hills, Michigan as members of the Horizon League. They finished the season 14–19, 8–10 in Horizon League play to finish in sixth place. They defeated Cleveland State in the first round of the Horizon League tournament before losing in the quarterfinals to Green Bay.

== Previous season ==
The Golden Grizzlies finished the 2018–19 season 16–17 overall, 11–7 in Horizon League play, where they finished in third place. In the Horizon League tournament, they defeated Youngstown State in the quarterfinals, before falling to Northern Kentucky in the semifinals.

== Roster ==
2019–20 Oakland Golden Grizzlies men's basketball team
Players
Coaches

Pos.	#	Name	Height	Weight	Year	Hometown
G	1	Rashad Williams	6 ft 2 in (1.88 m)	185 lb (84 kg)	So	Detroit, Michigan
G	2	Tray Maddox Jr.	6 ft 5 in (1.96 m)	200 lb (91 kg)	So	Novi, Michigan
F	4	Daniel Oladapo	6 ft 7 in (2.01 m)	220 lb (100 kg)	So	Bladensburg, Maryland
G	5	Emmanuel Newsome	6 ft 0 in (1.83 m)	151 lb (68 kg)	Fr	Boca Raton, Florida
G	10	Zach Goodline	6 ft 1 in (1.85 m)	175 lb (79 kg)	Fr	Coloma, Michigan
G	11	Blake Lampman (W)	6 ft 1 in (1.85 m)	171 lb (78 kg)	Fr	Haslett, Michigan
C	13	Brad Brechting	6 ft 11 in (2.11 m)	240 lb (109 kg)	RS Sr	Cedar Springs, Michigan
F	14	Xavier Hill-Mais	6 ft 7 in (2.01 m)	261 lb (118 kg)	RS Sr	Greensboro, North Carolina
G	15	Kevin Kangu	6 ft 4 in (1.93 m)	179 lb (81 kg)	Jr	Burlington, Ontario, Canada
C	20	Babatunde Sowunmi	6 ft 10 in (2.08 m)	254 lb (115 kg)	So	Lagos, Nigeria
G	21	Madison Monroe	6 ft 3 in (1.91 m)	185 lb (84 kg)	Fr	Charlotte, North Carolina
G	24	Kenny Pittman Jr.	6 ft 3 in (1.91 m)	181 lb (82 kg)	So	Chicago, Illinois
G	33	CJ Gettelfinger	6 ft 4 in (1.93 m)	186 lb (84 kg)	Fr	Knoxville, Tennessee
C	34	Yusuf Jihad (redshirt)	6 ft 8 in (2.03 m)	214 lb (97 kg)	RS Fr	Farmington Hills, Michigan
F	35	Jackie Harris	6 ft 6 in (1.98 m)	206 lb (93 kg)	Fr	Lambertville, Michigan

Head coach

- Greg Kampe (Bowling Green)

Assistant coach(es)

- Jeff Smith (Southeast Missouri State)
- Tony Jones (Fisk)
- Mychal Covington (Oakland)

Legend

- (C) Team captain
- (S) Suspended
- (I) Ineligible
- (W) Walk-on
- Injured
- Current redshirt

Roster
Last update: February 24, 2020

== Schedule and results ==
Date time, TV	Rank^{#}	Opponent^{#}	Result	Record	Site (attendance) city, state
Exhibition
October 24, 2019*; 7:00 pm, ESPN+		Rochester	W 61–59		Athletics Center O'rena (2,612); Auburn Hills, MI
October 30, 2019*; 7:00 pm, ESPN+		Saginaw Valley State	W 84–63		Athletics Center O'rena (1,919); Auburn Hills, MI
Non-conference regular season
November 5, 2019*; 7:00 pm, ESPN3		Goshen; Sunshine Slam	W 94–66	1–0	Athletics Center O'rena (2,554); Auburn Hills, MI
November 8, 2019*; 5:00 pm, FloSports		vs. Delaware; Sunshine Slam	L 53–56	1–1	Silver Spurs Arena; Kissimmee, FL
November 9, 2019*; 5:30 pm, FloSports		vs. UTSA; Sunshine Slam	W 75–62	2–1	Silver Spurs Arena (564); Kissimmee, FL
November 10, 2019*; 1:00 pm, FloSports		vs. Southern Illinois; Sunshine Slam	W 61–52	3–1	Silver Spurs Arena; Kissimmee, FL
November 16, 2019*; 12:00 pm, BTN+		at No. 7 Maryland	L 50–80	3–2	Xfinity Center (12,989); College Park, MD
November 18, 2019*; 7:00 pm, ESPN+		Hartford	W 60–50	4–2	Athletics Center O'rena (2,987); Auburn Hills, MI
November 25, 2019*; 7:00 pm, ESPN+		at Northern Illinois	L 50–74	4–3	Convocation Center (730); DeKalb, IL
November 30, 2019*; 7:00 pm, ESPN+		at Toledo	L 63–65	4–4	Savage Arena (3,931); Toledo, OH
December 3, 2019*; 7:00 pm, ESPN+		at Western Michigan	W 72–62	5–4	University Arena (2,114); Kalamazoo, MI
December 7, 2019*; 4:00 pm, ESPN+		at Bowling Green	L 65–68	5–5	Stroh Center (2,124); Bowling Green, OH
December 14, 2019*; 12:00 pm, ESPN2		vs. No. 16 Michigan State	L 49–72	5–6	Little Caesars Arena (18,145); Detroit, MI
December 18, 2019*; 8:00 pm, ESPNU		at Syracuse	L 62–74	5–7	Carrier Dome (16,394); Syracuse, NY
December 21, 2019*; 2:00 pm, ESPN3		Fairfield	L 59–61 ^{OT}	5–8	Athletics Center O'rena (2,788); Auburn Hills, MI
Horizon League regular season
December 28, 2019; 3:00 pm, ESPN+		Detroit Mercy	W 78–69	6–8 (1–0)	Athletics Center O'rena (3,792); Auburn Hills, MI
January 3, 2020; 7:00 pm, ESPNU		Wright State	L 69–96	6–9 (1–1)	Athletics Center O'rena (3,393); Auburn Hills, MI
January 5, 2020; 3:00 pm, ESPN+		Northern Kentucky	L 64–75	6–10 (1–2)	Athletics Center O'rena (2,879); Auburn Hills, MI
January 9, 2020; 7:00 pm, ESPN3		at Youngstown State	L 60–61	6–11 (1–3)	Beeghly Center (2,815); Youngstown, OH
January 11, 2020; 3:00 pm, ESPN3		at Cleveland State	W 68–55	7–11 (2–3)	Wolstein Center (1,561); Cleveland, OH
January 16, 2020; 8:00 pm, ESPN+		at Green Bay	L 69–73	7–12 (2–4)	Resch Center (1,232); Ashwaubenon, WI
January 18, 2020; 7:00 pm, ESPN+		at Milwaukee	L 68–73	7–13 (2–5)	UW–Milwaukee Panther Arena (1,492); Milwaukee, WI
January 23, 2020; 7:00 pm, ESPN+		UIC	L 50–80	7–14 (2–6)	Athletics Center O'rena (3,091); Auburn Hills, MI
January 25, 2020; 3:00 pm, ESPN3		IUPUI	L 85–89 ^{OT}	7–15 (2–7)	Athletics Center O'rena (3,644); Auburn Hills, MI
January 31, 2020; 7:00 pm, ESPN3		at Detroit Mercy	W 77-64	8–15 (3–7)	Calihan Hall (2,021); Detroit, MI
February 6, 2020; 7:00 pm, ESPN+		at Northern Kentucky	L 70–73	8–16 (3–8)	BB&T Arena (3,241); Highland Heights, KY
February 8, 2020; 7:00 pm, ESPN+		at Wright State	L 71–83	8–17 (3–9)	Nutter Center (5,053); Fairborn, OH
February 13, 2020; 7:00 pm, TV20		Cleveland State	W 79–74	9–17 (4–9)	Athletics Center O'rena (2,919); Auburn Hills, MI
February 15, 2020; 3:00 pm, ESPN3		Youngstown State	W 72–64	10–17 (5–9)	Athletics Center O'rena (3,488); Auburn Hills, MI
February 21, 2020; 8:00 pm, TV20		Milwaukee	W 75–68	11–17 (6–9)	Athletics Center O'rena (3,252); Auburn Hills, MI
February 23, 2020; 3:00 pm, TV20		Green Bay	W 92–88 ^{2OT}	12–17 (7–9)	Athletics Center O'rena (3,869); Auburn Hills, MI
February 27, 2020; 7:00 pm, ESPN+		at IUPUI	L 68–71	12–18 (7–10)	Indiana Farmers Coliseum (1,118); Indianapolis, IN
February 29, 2020; 4:12 pm, ESPN+		at UIC	W 68–66	13–18 (8–10)	Credit Union 1 Arena (2,237); Chicago, IL
Horizon League tournament
March 3, 2020; 7:00 pm, ESPN+	(6)	(7) Cleveland State; First round	W 80–59	14–18	Athletics Center O'rena (2,982); Auburn Hills, MI
March 5, 2020; 8:00 pm, ESPN+	(6)	at (3) Green Bay; Quarterfinals	L 63–78	14–19	Resch Center (2,439); Ashwaubenon, WI
*Non-conference game. ^{#}Rankings from AP Poll. (#) Tournament seedings in parentheses. All times are in Eastern.
