= 2019–20 Detroit Mercy Titans men's basketball team =

American college basketball season

2019–20 Detroit Mercy Titans men's basketball
- Conference: Horizon League
- Record: 8–23 (6–12 Horizon)
- Head coach: Mike Davis (2nd season)
- Assistant coaches: Mike Davis Jr.; Tracy Dildy; Keith Legree
- Home arena: Calihan Hall

2019–20 Horizon League men's basketball standings
	Conf.				Overall
Team	W		L	PCT	W		L	PCT
Wright State	15	–	3	.833	25	–	7	.781
Northern Kentucky †	13	–	5	.722	23	–	9	.719
Green Bay	11	–	7	.611	17	–	16	.515
Youngstown State	10	–	8	.556	18	–	15	.545
UIC	10	–	8	.556	18	–	17	.514
Oakland	8	–	10	.444	14	–	19	.424
Cleveland State	7	–	11	.389	11	–	21	.344
Milwaukee	7	–	11	.389	12	–	19	.387
Detroit Mercy*	6	–	12	.333	8	–	23	.258
IUPUI	3	–	15	.167	7	–	25	.219
† 2020 Horizon League Tournament winner * Ineligible for postseason due to APR violations

The 2019–20 Detroit Mercy Titans men's basketball team represented the University of Detroit Mercy in the 2019–20 NCAA Division I men's basketball season. The Titans, led by second-year head coach Mike Davis, played their home games at Calihan Hall in Detroit, Michigan as members of the Horizon League. They finished the season 8–23, 6–12 in Horizon League play to finish in ninth place. Due to low APR Scores, the Titans were ineligible for postseason play.

== Previous season ==
The Titans finished the 2018–19 season 11–20 overall, 8–10 in Horizon League play, ending in a 3-way tie for sixth place. As the No. 7 seed in the Horizon League tournament, they lost in the quarterfinals to eventual tournament champion Northern Kentucky.

== Departures ==
Name	Number	Pos.	Height	Weight	Year	Hometown	Reason for departure
Cole Long	11	F	6'8"	206	Junior	St. John's, NL	Transferred to Memorial University of Newfoundland
Lamar Hamrick	21	G	6'4"	190	Junior	New Castle, DE	Transferred to Portland State

== Incoming transfers ==
Name	Number	Pos.	Height	Weight	Year	Hometown	Years Eligible	Previous school
Justin Miller	2	F	6'6"	268	Senior	Beaver Dam, KY	1	Louisiana
Dwayne Rose Jr.	4	G	6'4"	195	Junior	Crete, IL	2	Southwestern Illinois College
Brad Calipari	12	G	6'0"	179	Graduate Student	Franklin Lakes, NJ	2	Kentucky
Alonde LeGrand	13	7	6'7"	205	Junior	Harlem, NY	2	State Fair CC
B. J. Maxwell	24	G	6'4"	200	Graduate Student	Austin, TX	1	Abilene Christian

== Roster ==
2019–20 Detroit Mercy Titans men's basketball team
Players
Coaches

Pos.	#	Name	Height	Weight	Year	Hometown
G	0	Antoine Davis	6 ft 1 in (1.85 m)	160 lb (73 kg)	So	Birmingham, Alabama
G/F	1	Marquis Moore	6 ft 6 in (1.98 m)	200 lb (91 kg)	So	Los Angeles, California
F	2	Justin Miller	6 ft 6 in (1.98 m)	268 lb (122 kg)	Sr	Beaver Dam, Kentucky
G	4	Dwayne Rose Jr.	6 ft 4 in (1.93 m)	195 lb (88 kg)	Jr	Crete, Illinois
G	5	Jordan Gorman	5 ft 10 in (1.78 m)	165 lb (75 kg)	Jr	Fort Wayne, Indiana
F	10	Boe Nguidjol	6 ft 8 in (2.03 m)	225 lb (102 kg)	So	Los Angeles, California
G	11	B.J. Maxwell	6 ft 4 in (1.93 m)	200 lb (91 kg)	GS	Austin, Texas
G	12	Brad Calipari	6 ft 0 in (1.83 m)	179 lb (81 kg)	GS	Franklin Lakes, New Jersey
F	13	Alonde LeGrand	6 ft 7 in (2.01 m)	205 lb (93 kg)	So	Harlem, New York
F	14	Sam Hofman	6 ft 5 in (1.96 m)	260 lb (118 kg)	Fr	Brussels, Belgium
G	15	Jamail Pink	6 ft 1 in (1.85 m)	160 lb (73 kg)	Fr	Houston, Texas
G/F	21	Chris Brandon	6 ft 7 in (2.01 m)	215 lb (98 kg)	So	Houston, Texas
F	41	Willy Isiani	6 ft 8 in (2.03 m)	230 lb (104 kg)	So	Tbilisi, Georgia

Head coach

- Mike Davis (Alabama)

Assistant coach(es)

- Mike Davis Jr. (UAB)
- Tracy Dildy (UIC)
- Keith Legree (Cincinnati)

Legend

- (C) Team captain
- (S) Suspended
- (I) Ineligible
- (W) Walk-on
- Injured
- Current redshirt

Roster
Last update: October 15, 2019

== Schedule and results ==
Date time, TV	Opponent	Result	Record	High points	High rebounds	High assists	Site (attendance) city, state
Regular season
November 10, 2019*; 4:00 pm, ACCNX	at NC State	L 65–84	0–1	28 – Davis	9 – Nguidjol	4 – Davis	PNC Arena (13,430); Raleigh, NC
November 17, 2019*; 3:00 pm, ACCNX	at Clemson	L 65–87	0–2	26 – Davis	13 – Miller	6 – Davis	Littlejohn Coliseum (5,804); Clemson, SC
November 19, 2019*; 9:00 pm, MWN	at Wyoming	L 49–76	0–3	13 – Calipari	9 – Moore	3 – Davis	Arena-Auditorium (2,967); Laramie, WY
November 24, 2019*; 3:00 pm	vs. UC Irvine; MGM Resorts Main Event	W 86–74	1–3	23 – Davis	7 – Nguidjol	6 – Davis	Clark High School (411); Las Vegas, NV
November 25, 2019*; 3:00 pm	vs. Louisiana; MGM Resorts Main Event	L 62–81	1–4	30 – Davis	4 – Moore	4 – Davis	Clark High School (113); Las Vegas, NV
November 30, 2019*; 1:00 pm	at Ohio	L 81–91	1–5	33 – Davis	6 – LeGrand	8 – Davis	Convocation Center (3,030); Athens, OH
December 3, 2019*; 7:00 pm, ESPN+	at Kent State	L 57–92	1–6	23 – Davis	9 – Miller	6 – Davis	MAC Center (2,030); Kent, OH
December 7, 2019*; 1:00 pm, ESPN+	Eastern Michigan	L 51–55	1–7	16 – Davis	10 – Moore	2 – Tied	Calihan Hall (1,925); Detroit, MI
December 10, 2019*; 7:00 pm, ACCN	at Notre Dame	L 71–110	1–8	27 – Davis	6 – Miller	4 – Davis	Edmund P. Joyce Center (6,441); Notre Dame, IN
December 14, 2019*; 3:00 pm, ESPN+	Toledo	L 72–80	1–9	20 – Calipari	9 – Brandon	7 – LeGrand	Calihan Hall (1,654); Detroit, MI
December 19, 2019*; 7:00 pm, ESPN3	Northeastern	L 61–74	1–10	26 – Davis	7 – Isiani	3 – LeGrand	Calihan Hall (1,151); Detroit, MI
December 21, 2019*; 3:00 pm, ESPN3	SIU Edwardsville	W 81–55	2–10	35 – Davis	10 – Brandon	5 – LeGrand	Calihan Hall (1,003); Detroit, MI
December 28, 2019; 3:00 pm, ESPN+	at Oakland	L 69–78	2–11 (0–1)	24 – Davis	18 – Brandon	6 – Davis	Athletics Center O'rena (3,792); Auburn Hills, MI
December 30, 2019*; 9:00 pm, RSNW	at No. 1 Gonzaga	L 72–93	2–12	31 – Davis	12 – Brandon	3 – Miller	McCarthey Athletic Center (6,000); Spokane, WA
January 3, 2020; 7:00 pm, ESPN3	Northern Kentucky	W 66–58	3–12 (1–1)	18 – Miller	9 – Brandon	5 – Miller	Calihan Hall (1,323); Detroit, MI
January 5, 2020; 1:00 pm, ESPN+	Wright State	L 69–70	3–13 (1–2)	24 – Davis	12 – Miller	6 – Davis	Calihan Hall (1,103); Detroit, MI
January 9, 2020; 7:00 pm, ESPN+	at Cleveland State	L 59–64	3–14 (1–3)	15 – Davis	16 – Brandon	4 – Davis	Wolstein Center (973); Cleveland, OH
January 11, 2020; 2:00 pm, ESPN+	at Youngstown State	L 67–69	3–15 (1–4)	16 – Miller	9 – Brandon	5 – Davis	Beeghly Center (2,510); Youngstown, OH
January 16, 2020; 8:00 pm, ESPN+	at Milwaukee	W 90–84	4–15 (2–4)	29 – Davis	14 – Brandon	5 – Davis	UW–Milwaukee Panther Arena (1,150); Milwaukee, WI
January 18, 2020; 1:00 pm, ESPN+	at Green Bay	L 80–83	4–16 (2–5)	17 – Davis	15 – Brandon	7 – Davis	Resch Center (1,937); Ashwaubenon, WI
January 23, 2020; 7:00 pm, ESPN+	IUPUI	W 76–64	5–16 (3–5)	27 – Davis	12 – Brandon	5 – Tied	Calihan Hall (1,624); Detroit, MI
January 25, 2020; 1:00 pm, ESPN+	UIC	W 70–69	6–16 (4–5)	16 – Moore	8 – Brandon	4 – Davis	Calihan Hall (1,866); Detroit, MI
January 31, 2020; 7:00 pm, ESPN3	Oakland	L 64–77	6–17 (4–6)	26 – Davis	6 – Rose Jr.	6 – Davis	Calihan Hall (2,021); Detroit, MI
February 6, 2020; 7:00 pm, ESPN+	at Wright State	L 86–98	6–18 (4–7)	28 – Davis	14 – Brandon	9 – Davis	Nutter Center (4,344); Fairborn, OH
February 8, 2020; 7:00 pm, ESPN+	at Northern Kentucky	L 65–84	6–19 (4–8)	21 – Rose Jr.	14 – Brandon	3 – Tied	BB&T Arena (6,231); Highland Heights, KY
February 13, 2020; 7:00 pm, ESPN+	Youngstown State	L 72–76	6–20 (4–9)	34 – Davis	11 – Moore	5 – Davis	Calihan Hall (1,275); Detroit, MI
February 15, 2020; 1:00 pm, ESPN+	Cleveland State	L 66–67 ^{OT}	6–21 (4–10)	20 – Moore	17 – Brandon	4 – Davis	Calihan Hall (1,274); Detroit, MI
February 21, 2020; 7:00 pm, ESPN+	Green Bay	L 67–84	6–22 (4–11)	29 – Davis	7 – Moore	2 – Tied	Calihan Hall (1,211); Detroit, MI
February 23, 2020; 1:00 pm, ESPN+	Milwaukee	W 79–73	7–22 (5–11)	27 – Davis	11 – Tied	6 – Davis	Calihan Hall (1,247); Detroit, MI
February 27, 2020; 8:00 pm, ESPN+	at UIC	L 67–84	7–23 (5–12)	26 – Davis	8 – Rose Jr.	5 – Davis	Credit Union 1 Arena (2,529); Chicago, IL
February 29, 2020; 12:00 pm, ESPN+	at IUPUI	W 90–88	8–23 (6–12)	43 – Davis	10 – Brandon	4 – Gorman	Indiana Farmers Coliseum (1,252); Indianapolis, IN
*Non-conference game. ^{#}Rankings from AP Poll. (#) Tournament seedings in parentheses. All times are in Eastern Time.
