= 2019–20 Northern Kentucky Norse men's basketball team =

American college basketball season

2019–20 Northern Kentucky Norse men's basketball
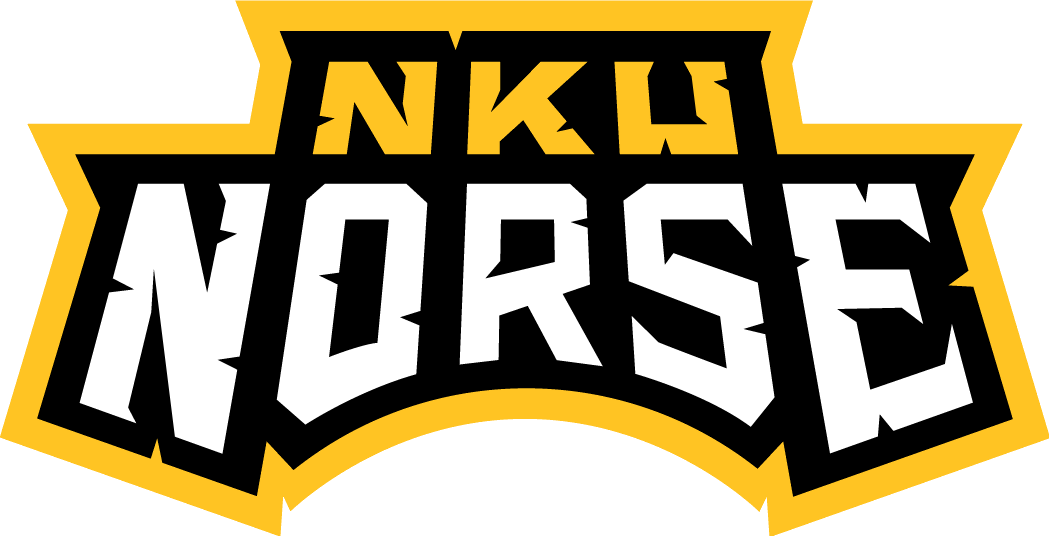

Horizon League tournament champions
- Conference: Horizon League
- Record: 23–9 (13–5 Horizon)
- Head coach: Darrin Horn (1st season)
- Assistant coaches: David Harris; Eric Haut; Simon McCormack
- Home arena: BB&T Arena

2019–20 Horizon League men's basketball standings
	Conf.				Overall
Team	W		L	PCT	W		L	PCT
Wright State	15	–	3	.833	25	–	7	.781
Northern Kentucky †	13	–	5	.722	23	–	9	.719
Green Bay	11	–	7	.611	17	–	16	.515
Youngstown State	10	–	8	.556	18	–	15	.545
UIC	10	–	8	.556	18	–	17	.514
Oakland	8	–	10	.444	14	–	19	.424
Cleveland State	7	–	11	.389	11	–	21	.344
Milwaukee	7	–	11	.389	12	–	19	.387
Detroit Mercy*	6	–	12	.333	8	–	23	.258
IUPUI	3	–	15	.167	7	–	25	.219
† 2020 Horizon League Tournament winner * Ineligible for postseason due to APR violations

The 2019–20 Northern Kentucky Norse men's basketball team represented Northern Kentucky University in the 2019–20 NCAA Division I men's basketball season. The Norse, led by first-year head coach Darrin Horn, played their home games at BB&T Arena in Highland Heights, Kentucky as members of the Horizon League. They finished the season 23–9, 13–5 in Horizon League play, to finish in second place. They defeated Green Bay and UIC to become champions of the Horizon League tournament. They received the Horizon League's automatic bid to the NCAA tournament. However, the NCAA tournament was cancelled amid the COVID-19 pandemic.

== Previous season ==
The Norse finished the 2018–19 season 26–9 overall, 13–5 in Horizon League play, where they finished as co-regular-season champions, alongside Wright State. In the Horizon League tournament, they defeated Detroit Mercy in the quarterfinals and Oakland in the semifinals, advancing to the championship game, where they faced Wright State, ultimately winning the game, to become Horizon League tournament champions. In turn, they received the Horizon League's automatic bid to the NCAA tournament, where they lost to Texas Tech in the first round.

On April 14, 2019, it was announced that former head coach John Brannen had accepted the head coaching position at Cincinnati. On April 23, former Texas assistant Darrin Horn was named as the next head coach.

== Departures ==
Name	Number	Pos.	Height	Weight	Year	Hometown	Reason for departure
Zaynah Robinson	5	G	6' 0"	180	Graduate student	Atlanta, GA	Graduated
Gerald Gray Jr.	10	G	6' 3"	170	RS Freshman	Louisville, KY	Walk-on; left program
Brooks Ely	24	G	6' 4"	205	RS Junior	Lexington, KY	Left program
Chris Vogt	33	C	7' 1"	240	Sophomore	Mayfield, KY	Transferred to Cincinnati
Drew McDonald	34	F/C	6 '8"	250	Senior	Cold Spring, KY	Graduated

== Incoming transfers ==
Name	Pos.	Height	Weight	Year	Hometown	Notes
Adham Eleeda	G	6' 5"	200	Junior	Toronto, ON	Junior college transferred from Sheridan College
Bryson Langdon	G	5' 9"	160	Sophomore	Chicago, IL	Junior college transferred from Arizona Western CC
Karl Harris	G	6' 5"	185	Graduate student	Chicago, IL	Transferred from Northern Arizona after graduating. Will have one year of eligibility beginning immediately.

== Roster ==
2019–20 Northern Kentucky Norse men's basketball team
Players
Coaches

Pos.	#	Name	Height	Weight	Year	Previous school	Hometown
F	0	Silas Adheke	6 ft 8 in (2.03 m)	245 lb (111 kg)	RS Jr	Evansville	Chattanooga, TN
G	1	Adham Eleeda	6 ft 5 in (1.96 m)	200 lb (91 kg)	Jr	Sheridan College	Toronto, ON
G	2	Paul Djoko	6 ft 4 in (1.93 m)	200 lb (91 kg)	RS So	Châlons-Reims	Strasbourg, France
G	3	Tre Cobbs	6 ft 0 in (1.83 m)	190 lb (86 kg)	RS Jr	Lima Central Catholic	Lima, OH
F	4	Adrian Nelson	6 ft 7 in (2.01 m)	220 lb (100 kg)	So	Pickerington Central	Pickerington, OH
G	5	Bryson Langdon	5 ft 9 in (1.75 m)	160 lb (73 kg)	So	Arizona Western CC	Chicago, IL
F	10	John Harge	6 ft 8 in (2.03 m)	220 lb (100 kg)	Fr	Hillcrest Prep	Aurora, CO
G	11	Jalen Tate	6 ft 6 in (1.98 m)	170 lb (77 kg)	RS Jr	Pickerington Central	Pickerington, OH
G	12	Trevon Faulkner	6 ft 3 in (1.91 m)	195 lb (88 kg)	So	Mercer County	Harrodsburg, KY
G	14	Karl Harris	6 ft 5 in (1.96 m)	185 lb (84 kg)	GS	Northern Arizona	Chicago, IL
G	15	Tyler Sharpe	6 ft 0 in (1.83 m)	200 lb (91 kg)	Sr	Bullitt East	Mount Washington, KY
G/F	30	Bryant Mocaby	6 ft 5 in (1.96 m)	200 lb (91 kg)	So	Derby	Derby, KS
F	32	Dantez Walton	6 ft 6 in (1.98 m)	215 lb (98 kg)	Sr	Lima Central Catholic	Lima, OH
F/C	44	David Wassler	6 ft 10 in (2.08 m)	235 lb (107 kg)	So	St. Xavier	Cincinnati, OH

Head coach

- Darrin Horn (Western Kentucky)

Assistant coach(es)

- David Harris (Ashland)
- Eric Haut (Kent State)
- Simon McCormack (American)

Legend

- (C) Team captain
- (S) Suspended
- (I) Ineligible
- (W) Walk-on
- Injured
- Current redshirt

Roster
Last update: September 26, 2024

== Schedule and results ==
Date time, TV	Rank^{#}	Opponent^{#}	Result	Record	Site (attendance) city, state
Exhibition
October 30, 2019*; 7:00 p.m.		Transylvania	W 71–45		BB&T Arena (2,593); Highland Heights, KY
Non-conference regular season
November 5, 2019*; 7:00 p.m., ESPN3		UC–Clermont	W 105–55	1–0	BB&T Arena (2,857); Highland Heights, KY
November 8, 2019*; 8:00 p.m., SECN+		at Missouri	L 56–71	1–1	Mizzou Arena (8,486); Columbia, MO
November 12, 2019*; 7:00 p.m., ESPN+		at Coastal Carolina	W 69–68	2–1	HTC Center (1,015); Conway, SC
November 17, 2019*; 2:00 p.m., ESPN3		Coppin State; Collegiate Hoops Roadshow – Norse Regional	W 82–70	3–1	BB&T Arena (2,807); Highland Heights, KY
November 20, 2019*; 7:00 p.m., ESPN+		at Ball State	W 59–57	4–1	Worthen Arena (3,722); Muncie, IN
November 23, 2019*; 7:00 p.m., ESPN3		Texas Southern; Collegiate Hoops Roadshow – Norse Regional	L 96–98 ^{2OT}	4–2	BB&T Arena (3,118); Highland Heights, KY
November 25, 2019*; 7:00 p.m., ESPN3		Midway; Collegiate Hoops Roadshow – Norse Regional	W 86–56	5–2	BB&T Arena (2,478); Highland Heights, KY
November 30, 2019*; 3:00 p.m., SECN+		at Arkansas	L 60–66	5–3	Bud Walton Arena (14,080); Fayetteville, AR
December 3, 2019*; 7:00 p.m., ESPN+		at Miami (OH)	W 76–54	6–3	Millett Hall (1,588); Oxford, OH
December 8, 2019*; 7:00 p.m., ESPN+		Eastern Kentucky	W 76–57	7–3	BB&T Arena (3,199); Highland Heights, KY
December 15, 2019*; 2:00 p.m., ESPN+		Illinois State	W 79–64	8–3	BB&T Arena (2,820); Highland Heights, KY
December 21, 2019*; 7:00 p.m., ESPN+		at UNC Greensboro	L 50–67	8–4	Fleming Gymnasium (648); Greensboro, NC
Horizon League regular season
December 28, 2019; 1:00 p.m., ESPN+		Milwaukee	W 74–64	9–4 (1–0)	BB&T Arena (2,551); Highland Heights, KY
December 30, 2019; 7:00 p.m., ESPN+		Green Bay	L 59–73	9–5 (1–1)	BB&T Arena (3,127); Highland Heights, KY
January 3, 2020; 7:00 p.m., ESPN3		at Detroit Mercy	L 58–66	9–6 (1–2)	Calihan Hall (1,323); Detroit, MI
January 5, 2020; 3:00 p.m., ESPN+		at Oakland	W 75–64	10–6 (2–2)	Athletics Center O'rena (2,879); Auburn Hills, MI
January 10, 2020; 7:00 p.m., ESPN2		at UIC	W 68–52	11–6 (3–2)	Credit Union 1 Arena (1,858); Chicago, IL
January 12, 2020; 2:00 p.m., ESPN+		at IUPUI	W 96–71	12–6 (4–2)	Indiana Farmers Coliseum (789); Indianapolis, IN
January 16, 2020; 7:00 p.m., ESPN3		Youngstown State	W 88–63	13–6 (5–2)	BB&T Arena (3,232); Highland Heights, KY
January 18, 2020; 7:00 p.m., ESPN+		Cleveland State	W 75–49	14–6 (6–2)	BB&T Arena (4,390); Highland Heights, KY
January 24, 2020; 9:00 p.m., ESPNU		at Wright State	L 63–95	14–7 (6–3)	Nutter Center (6,217); Fairborn, OH
January 31, 2020; 9:00 p.m., ESPNU		at Green Bay	W 71–62	15–7 (7–3)	Kress Events Center (1,885); Green Bay, WI
February 2, 2020; 2:00 p.m., ESPN+		at Milwaukee	W 65–56	16–7 (8–3)	UW–Milwaukee Panther Arena (1,070); Milwaukee, WI
February 6, 2020; 7:00 p.m., FSOH		Oakland	W 73–70	17–7 (9–3)	BB&T Arena (3,241); Highland Heights, KY
February 8, 2020; 7:00 p.m., ESPN+		Detroit Mercy	W 84–65	18–7 (10–3)	BB&T Arena (6,231); Highland Heights, KY
February 14, 2020; 7:00 p.m., ESPN+		IUPUI	W 84–70	19–7 (11–3)	BB&T Arena (3,013); Highland Heights, KY
February 16, 2020; 2:00 p.m., FSOH		UIC	L 43–73	19–8 (11–4)	BB&T Arena (3,545); Highland Heights, KY
February 20, 2020; 7:00 p.m., ESPN+		at Cleveland State	W 73–59	20–8 (12–4)	Wolstein Center (1,508); Cleveland, OH
February 22, 2020; 2:00 p.m., ESPN+		at Youngstown State	W 61–59	21–8 (13–4)	Beeghly Center (4,213); Youngstown, OH
February 28, 2020; 7:00 p.m., ESPNU		Wright State	L 62–64	21–9 (13–5)	BB&T Arena (6,776); Highland Heights, KY
Horizon League tournament
March 9, 2020; 9:30 p.m., ESPN2	(2)	vs. (3) Green Bay; Semifinals	W 80–69	22–9	Indiana Farmers Coliseum (1,923); Indianapolis, IN
March 10, 2020; 7:00 p.m., ESPN	(2)	vs. (4) UIC; Championship	W 71–62	23–9	Indiana Farmers Coliseum (1,861); Indianapolis, IN
*Non-conference game. ^{#}Rankings from AP poll. (#) Tournament seedings in parentheses. All times are in Eastern.
