= 2019–20 Milwaukee Panthers men's basketball team =

American college basketball season

2019–20 Milwaukee Panthers men's basketball
- Conference: Horizon League
- Record: 12–19 (7–11 Horizon)
- Head coach: Patrick Baldwin (3rd season)
- Assistant coaches: Paris Parham; Terrance McGee; John Bowler
- Home arena: UW–Milwaukee Panther Arena; Klotsche Center

2019–20 Horizon League men's basketball standings
	Conf.				Overall
Team	W		L	PCT	W		L	PCT
Wright State	15	–	3	.833	25	–	7	.781
Northern Kentucky †	13	–	5	.722	23	–	9	.719
Green Bay	11	–	7	.611	17	–	16	.515
Youngstown State	10	–	8	.556	18	–	15	.545
UIC	10	–	8	.556	18	–	17	.514
Oakland	8	–	10	.444	14	–	19	.424
Cleveland State	7	–	11	.389	11	–	21	.344
Milwaukee	7	–	11	.389	12	–	19	.387
Detroit Mercy*	6	–	12	.333	8	–	23	.258
IUPUI	3	–	15	.167	7	–	25	.219
† 2020 Horizon League Tournament winner * Ineligible for postseason due to APR violations

The 2019–20 Milwaukee Panthers men's basketball team represented the University of Wisconsin–Milwaukee during the 2019–20 NCAA Division I men's basketball season. The Panthers, led by third-year head coach Pat Baldwin, played their home games at the UW–Milwaukee Panther Arena and the Klotsche Center as members of the Horizon League. They finished the season 12–19, 7–11 in Horizon League play to finish in a tie for seventh place. They lost in the first round of the Horizon League tournament to Youngstown State.

== Previous season ==
The Panthers finished the 2018–19 season 9–22, 4–14 in Horizon League play to finish in last place. They failed to qualify for the Horizon League tournament.

== Roster ==
2019–20 Milwaukee Panthers men's basketball team
Players
Coaches

Pos.	#	Name	Height	Weight	Year	Hometown
G	1	DeAndre Abram	6 ft 8 in (2.03 m)	210 lb (95 kg)	RS Sr	Carrollton, Texas
F/C	2	Harrison Henderson	6 ft 10 in (2.08 m)	240 lb (109 kg)	RS Jr	Dallas, Texas
G	3	Te'Jon Lucas	6 ft 2 in (1.88 m)	180 lb (82 kg)	RS Jr	Milwaukee, Wisconsin
F/C	4	Wil Sessoms	6 ft 9 in (2.06 m)	225 lb (102 kg)	Sr	Linden, New Jersey
G	5	C.J. Wilbourn	6 ft 7 in (2.01 m)	233 lb (106 kg)	Fr	Bloomington, Illinois
G	10	Arturro Bingham	6 ft 5 in (1.96 m)	195 lb (88 kg)	So	Edwards, Mississippi
F	11	Bobby Arthur-Williams Jr.	6 ft 7 in (2.01 m)	227 lb (103 kg)	Sr	Potomac, Maryland
F/C	12	Amir Allen	6 ft 8 in (2.03 m)	225 lb (102 kg)	Jr	Randolph, New Jersey
G/F	13	Courtney Brown Jr.	6 ft 7 in (2.01 m)	205 lb (93 kg)	Fr	Cottage Grove, Minnesota
G	14	Tyler Ellingson	6 ft 5 in (1.96 m)	180 lb (82 kg)	Fr	Menomonee Falls, Wisconsin
G	15	Ryan Waddell	6 ft 2 in (1.88 m)	175 lb (79 kg)	Fr	Mequon, Wisconsin
G	20	Darius Roy	6 ft 2 in (1.88 m)	185 lb (84 kg)	Sr	Lawton, Oklahoma
F	21	Lincoln Wieseman	6 ft 5 in (1.96 m)	215 lb (98 kg)	Sr	Lake Geneva, Wisconsin
G/F	22	Shae Mitchell	6 ft 7 in (2.01 m)	205 lb (93 kg)	RS Fr	Lakeville, Minnesota
G	24	Josh Thomas	6 ft 4 in (1.93 m)	205 lb (93 kg)	RS Jr	Chicago, Illinois
G	25	Jamar Madge Jr.	6 ft 3 in (1.91 m)	180 lb (82 kg)	So	Kansas City, Missouri
G	34	Tyler Behrendt	5 ft 11 in (1.8 m)	175 lb (79 kg)	Jr	Germantown, Wisconsin
G/F		Vin Baker Jr.	6 ft 9 in (2.06 m)	190 lb (86 kg)	Jr	Old Saybrook, Connecticut

Head coach

- Patrick Baldwin (Northwestern)

Assistant coach(es)

- Paris Parham (Minnesota State)
- Terrance McGee (Missouri State)
- John Bowler (Eastern Michigan)

Legend

- (C) Team captain
- (S) Suspended
- (I) Ineligible
- (W) Walk-on
- Injured
- Current redshirt

Roster
Last update: January 15, 2020

== Schedule and results ==
Date time, TV	Rank^{#}	Opponent^{#}	Result	Record	Site (attendance) city, state
Exhibition
Oct 31, 2019*; 7:00 pm		Cardinal Stritch	W 88–46	-	Klotsche Center; Milwaukee, WI
Non-conference regular season
Nov 5, 2019*; 7:00 pm, ESPN3		Concordia (WI)	W 72–62	1–0	UWM Panther Arena (1,156); Milwaukee, WI
Nov 9, 2019*; 6:00 pm, ESPN3		Western Michigan	L 110–115 ^{3OT}	1–1	UWM Panther Arena (2,038); Milwaukee, WI
Nov 12, 2019*; 7:00 pm, ESPN+		Wisconsin Lutheran	W 103–53	2–1	UWM Panther Arena (895); Milwaukee, WI
Nov 15, 2019*; 7:00 pm, ESPN3		Kansas City	W 61–52	3–1	UWM Panther Arena (1,590); Milwaukee, WI
Nov 19, 2019*; 7:00 pm, ESPN+		North Dakota	W 79–70	4–1	UWM Panther Arena (971); Milwaukee, WI
Nov 22, 2019*; 1:00 pm, FloHoops.com		vs. Rice; Islands of the Bahamas Showcase First Round	L 69–75	4–2	Baha Mar Convention Center (300); Nassau, Bahamas
Nov 23, 2019*; 10:00 am, FloHoops.com		vs. Morgan State; Islands of the Bahamas Showcase Consolation 2nd Round	W 62–57	5–2	Baha Mar Convention Center (300); Nassau, Bahamas
Nov 24, 2019*; 1:30 pm, FloHoops.com		vs. George Washington; Islands of the Bahamas Showcase 5th place game	L 63–66	5–3	Baha Mar Convention Center (300); Nassau, Bahamas
Dec 3, 2019*; 7:00 pm, ESPN+		at Drake	L 53–56	5–4	Knapp Center (2,373); Des Moines, IA
Dec 10, 2019*; 7:00 pm, ESPN+		at No. 2 Kansas	L 68–95	5–5	Allen Fieldhouse (16,300); Lawrence, KS
Dec 14, 2019*; 7:00 pm, ESPN+		Eastern Illinois	L 68–75	5–6	UWM Panther Arena (1,101); Milwaukee, WI
Dec 21, 2019*; 4:00 pm, BTN		at Wisconsin	L 64–83	5–7	Kohl Center (17,030); Madison, WI
Horizon League regular season
Dec 28, 2019; 12:00 pm, ESPN+		at Northern Kentucky	L 64–74	5–8 (0–1)	BB&T Arena (2,551); Highland Heights, KY
Dec 30, 2019; 6:00 pm, ESPN3		at Wright State	L 70–82	5–9 (0–2)	Nutter Center (3,470); Fairborn, OH
Jan 3, 2020; 7:00 pm, ESPN3		IUPUI	W 78–74	6–9 (1–2)	UWM Panther Arena (977); Milwaukee, WI
Jan 5, 2020; 1:00 pm, ESPN+		UIC	W 64–62	7–9 (2–2)	UWM Panther Arena (1,012); Milwaukee, WI
Jan 11, 2020; 6:00 pm, ESPN+		at Green Bay	W 87–80	8–9 (3–2)	Resch Center (2,494); Green Bay, WI
Jan 16, 2020; 7:00 pm, ESPN+		Detroit Mercy	L 84–90	8–10 (3–3)	UWM Panther Arena (1,150); Milwaukee, WI
Jan 18, 2020; 6:00 pm, ESPN+		Oakland	W 73–68	9–10 (4–3)	UWM Panther Arena (1,492); Milwaukee, WI
Jan 23, 2020; 6:00 pm, ESPN+		at Youngstown State	W 75–73 ^{OT}	10–10 (5–3)	Beeghly Center (1,712); Youngstown, OH
Jan 25, 2020; 2:00 pm, ESPN3		at Cleveland State	L 53–70	10–11 (5–4)	Wolstein Center (1,062); Cleveland, OH
Jan 31, 2020; 7:00 pm, ESPN3		Wright State	L 61–65	10–12 (5–5)	UWM Panther Arena (2,120); Milwaukee, WI
Feb 2, 2020; 1:00 pm, ESPN+		Northern Kentucky	L 56–65	10–13 (5–6)	UWM Panther Arena (1,070); Milwaukee, WI
Feb 6, 2020; 7:00 pm, ESPN3		at UIC	W 74–57	11–13 (6–6)	Credit Union 1 Arena (1,995); Chicago, IL
Feb 8, 2020; 11:00 am, ESPN+		at IUPUI	W 80–79 ^{OT}	12–13 (7–6)	Indiana Farmers Coliseum (1,007); Indianapolis, IN
Feb 15, 2020; 6:00 pm, ESPN+		Green Bay	L 90–94	12–14 (7–7)	UWM Panther Arena (2,246); Milwaukee, WI
Feb 21, 2020; 7:00 pm, ESPN+		at Oakland	L 68–75	12–15 (7–8)	Athletics Center O'rena (3,252); Auburn Hills, MI
Feb 23, 2020; 12:00 pm, ESPN+		at Detroit Mercy	L 73–79	12–16 (7–9)	Calihan Hall (1,247); Detroit, MI
Feb 27, 2020; 7:00 pm, ESPN+		Cleveland State	L 68–70	12–17 (7–10)	UWM Panther Arena (1,462); Milwaukee, WI
Feb 29, 2020; 7:00 pm, ESPN+		Youngstown State	L 69–73	12–18 (7–11)	UWM Panther Arena (2,198); Milwaukee, WI
Horizon League tournament
Mar 3, 2020; 6:00 pm, ESPN+	(8)	at (5) Youngstown State; First round	L 57–63	12–19	Beeghly Center (2,110); Youngstown, OH
*Non-conference game. ^{#}Rankings from AP Poll. (#) Tournament seedings in parentheses. All times are in Central Time.
