= 2020 Horizon League men's basketball tournament =

- Classification: Division I
- Season: 2019–20
- Teams: 9
- Site: Campus sites (First Round and Quarterfinals); Indiana Farmers Coliseum; Indianapolis, Indiana (Semifinals and Finals)
- Champions: Northern Kentucky (3rd title)
- Winning coach: Darrin Horn (1st title)
- MVP: Jalen Tate (Northern Kentucky)
- Television: ESPN+, ESPNU, ESPN2, ESPN

2019–20 Horizon League men's basketball standings
	Conf.				Overall
Team	W		L	PCT	W		L	PCT
Wright State	15	–	3	.833	25	–	7	.781
Northern Kentucky †	13	–	5	.722	23	–	9	.719
Green Bay	11	–	7	.611	17	–	16	.515
Youngstown State	10	–	8	.556	18	–	15	.545
UIC	10	–	8	.556	18	–	17	.514
Oakland	8	–	10	.444	14	–	19	.424
Cleveland State	7	–	11	.389	11	–	21	.344
Milwaukee	7	–	11	.389	12	–	19	.387
Detroit Mercy*	6	–	12	.333	8	–	23	.258
IUPUI	3	–	15	.167	7	–	25	.219
† 2020 Horizon League Tournament winner * Ineligible for postseason due to APR violations

The 2020 Horizon League men's basketball tournament was the final event of the 2019–20 men's basketball season for the Horizon League, and the final event in the league's 2019–20 season. It began on March 3, 2020, and ended on March 10; first-round and quarterfinal games were played at the home courts of the higher seed, with all remaining games at Indiana Farmers Coliseum in Indianapolis. The winner received the conference's automatic berth into the NCAA tournament, though that was cancelled two days later due to the coronavirus pandemic, along with all other winter tourneys and spring sports.

== Seeds ==
9 of 10 eligible teams participated in the tournament with the top 2 teams receiving byes to the semifinals. Detroit Mercy was ineligible for postseason play, including the conference tournament, due to low APR scores. Teams were seeded by conference record, then seeded further with tiebreakers for teams with the same win–loss records.

Seed	School	Conf	Tiebreaker
1	Wright State	15−3	
2	Northern Kentucky	13–5	
3	Green Bay	11–7	
4	UIC	10–8	1–1 vs Northern Kentucky
5	Youngstown State	10–8	0–2 vs Northern Kentucky
6	Oakland	8–10	
7	Cleveland State	7–11	2–0 vs Milwaukee
8	Milwaukee	7–11	0–2 vs Cleveland State
9	IUPUI	3–15	

== Schedule ==
Game	Time	Matchup	Score	Television
First Round – Tuesday, March 3
1	8:00 pm	No. 9 IUPUI at No. 4 UIC	59–93	ESPN+
2	7:00 pm	No. 8 Milwaukee at No. 5 Youngstown State	57–63	ESPN+
3	7:00 pm	No. 7 Cleveland State at No. 6 Oakland	59–80	ESPN+
Quarterfinals – Thursday, March 5
4	8:00 pm	No. 6 Oakland at No. 3 Green Bay	63–78	ESPN+
5	8:00 pm	No. 5 Youngstown State at No. 4 UIC	61–67	ESPN+
Semifinals – Monday, March 9
6	7:00 pm	No. 4 UIC vs. No. 1 Wright State	73–56	ESPNU
7	9:30 pm	No. 3 Green Bay vs. No. 2 Northern Kentucky	69–80	ESPN2
Finals – Tuesday, March 10
8	7:00 pm	No. 4 UIC vs. No. 2 Northern Kentucky	71–62	ESPN
All game times local. Rankings denote tournament seed

== Bracket ==
First round Tuesday, March 3
4	UIC	93
9	IUPUI	59
5	Youngstown State	63
8	Milwaukee	57
6	Oakland	80
7	Cleveland State	59

Quarterfinals; Thursday, March 5
3	Green Bay	78
6	Oakland	63
4	UIC	67
5	Youngstown State	61

Semifinals; Monday, March 9
1	Wright State	56
4	UIC	73
2	Northern Kentucky	80
3	Green Bay	69

Championship; Tuesday, March 10
4	UIC	62
2	Northern Kentucky	71
