= 2019–20 UIC Flames men's basketball team =

American college basketball season

2019–20 UIC Flames men's basketball
- Conference: Horizon League
- Record: 18–17 (10–8 Horizon)
- Head coach: Steve McClain (5th season)
- Assistant coaches: Tony Harvey; Dee Brown; Rod Clark
- Home arena: Credit Union 1 Arena

2019–20 Horizon League men's basketball standings
	Conf.				Overall
Team	W		L	PCT	W		L	PCT
Wright State	15	–	3	.833	25	–	7	.781
Northern Kentucky †	13	–	5	.722	23	–	9	.719
Green Bay	11	–	7	.611	17	–	16	.515
Youngstown State	10	–	8	.556	18	–	15	.545
UIC	10	–	8	.556	18	–	17	.514
Oakland	8	–	10	.444	14	–	19	.424
Cleveland State	7	–	11	.389	11	–	21	.344
Milwaukee	7	–	11	.389	12	–	19	.387
Detroit Mercy*	6	–	12	.333	8	–	23	.258
IUPUI	3	–	15	.167	7	–	25	.219
† 2020 Horizon League Tournament winner * Ineligible for postseason due to APR violations

The 2019–20 UIC Flames men's basketball team represented the University of Illinois at Chicago in the 2019–20 NCAA Division I men's basketball season. The Flames, led by fifth-year head coach Steve McClain, played their home games at Credit Union 1 Arena in Chicago, Illinois as members of the Horizon League. The finished the season 18–17, 10–8 in Horizon League to play to finish in a tie for fourth place. As the No. 4 seed in the Horizon League tournament, they defeated IUPUI, Youngstown State, and top-seeded Wright State to advance to the championship game. There they lost to Northern Kentucky.

Shortly after the season, the school announced that head coach Steve McClain would not return as coach of the Flames. A couple of weeks later, the school named Texas assistant coach Luke Yaklich as the Flames' new coach.

== Previous season ==
The Flames finished the 2018–19 season 16–16 overall, 10–8 in Horizon League play to finish in a tie for fourth place. In the Horizon League tournament, they were defeated by Green Bay in the quarterfinals.

== Roster ==
2019–20 UIC Flames men's basketball team
Players
Coaches

Pos.	#	Name	Height	Weight	Year	Hometown
G	0	Brian Taylor	6 ft 6 in (1.98 m)	200 lb (91 kg)	Fr	Detroit, Michigan
G	1	Marcus Ottey	6 ft 2 in (1.88 m)	185 lb (84 kg)	Sr	Ajax, Ontario, Canada
F	2	Michael Diggins	6 ft 8 in (2.03 m)	195 lb (88 kg)	Jr	Las Vegas, Nevada
F	3	Jacob Wiley	6 ft 7 in (2.01 m)	210 lb (95 kg)	Jr	Houston, Texas
G	4	Tarkus Ferguson	6 ft 4 in (1.93 m)	190 lb (86 kg)	Sr	Belleville, Illinois
F	10	Deon Ejim	6 ft 6 in (1.98 m)	235 lb (107 kg)	RS Fr	Toronto, Ontario, Canada
F	13	Jordan Blount	6 ft 8 in (2.03 m)	220 lb (100 kg)	Sr	Cork, Ireland
G/F	20	Jamie Ahale	6 ft 5 in (1.96 m)	205 lb (93 kg)	Jr	Montrose, Australia
F	22	Rob Howard	6 ft 8 in (2.03 m)	230 lb (104 kg)	Sr	Gary, Indiana
F	23	Braelen Bridges	6 ft 10 in (2.08 m)	225 lb (102 kg)	So	McDonough, Georgia
G	25	Godwin Boahen	5 ft 11 in (1.8 m)	180 lb (82 kg)	Sr	Toronto, Ontario, Canada
F	35	Travell Washington	6 ft 9 in (2.06 m)	230 lb (104 kg)	So	San Bernardino, California

Head coach

- Steve McClain (Chadron State)

Assistant coach(es)

- Tony Harvey (Cameron)
- Dee Brown (Illinois)
- Rod Clark (Lindsey Wilson)

Legend

- (C) Team captain
- (S) Suspended
- (I) Ineligible
- (W) Walk-on
- Injured
- Current redshirt

Roster
Last update: January 27, 2020

== Schedule and results ==
Date time, TV	Rank^{#}	Opponent^{#}	Result	Record	Site (attendance) city, state
Exhibition
November 3, 2019*; 4:00 pm		Parkside	W 63–59		Credit Union 1 Arena (566); Chicago, IL
Non-conference regular season
November 5, 2019*; 7:00 pm, ESPN3		Olivet Nazarene	W 75–72	1–0	Credit Union 1 Arena (2,003); Chicago, IL
November 8, 2019*; 6:00 pm, ESPNU		at No. 14 Memphis	L 46–92	1–1	FedExForum (15,923); Memphis, TN
November 13, 2019*; 7:00 pm, ESPN+		Ball State	L 48–67	1–2	Credit Union 1 Arena (1,906); Chicago, IL
November 16, 2019*; 7:00 pm, ESPN3		at Bradley	L 56–65	1–3	Carver Arena (5,411); Peoria, IL
November 21, 2019*; 7:00 pm, ESPN3		Robert Morris	W 72–62	2–3	Credit Union 1 Arena (1,766); Chicago, IL
November 23, 2019*; 4:00 pm, ESPN+		Mercer; Boca Raton Beach Classic	L 68–72	2–4	Credit Union 1 Arena (1,276); Chicago, IL
November 26, 2019*; 7:00 pm, ESPN+		Canisius; Boca Raton Beach Classic	L 64–94	2–5	Credit Union 1 Arena (1,343); Chicago, IL
December 1, 2019*; 5:00 pm		at Florida Atlantic; Boca Raton Beach Classic Hall of Fame Bracket Semifinals	L 70–71	2–6	FAU Arena; Boca Raton, FL
December 2, 2019*; 4:00 pm		vs. San Diego; Boca Raton Beach Classic Hall of Fame Bracket 3rd Place Game	W 89–83	3–6	FAU Arena; Boca Raton, FL
December 7, 2019*; 3:12 pm, ESPN3		Purdue Fort Wayne	W 62–49	4–6	Credit Union 1 Arena (1,594); Chicago, IL
December 14, 2019*; 1:00 pm, FS1		at DePaul	L 65–86	4–7	Wintrust Arena (4,620); Chicago, IL
December 18, 2019*; 6:00 pm, ESPN3		at Illinois State	L 66–67	4–8	Redbird Arena (3,563); Normal, IL
December 20, 2019*; 7:00 pm, ESPN3		UC Irvine	W 76–67	5–8	Credit Union 1 Arena (1,567); Chicago, IL
Horizon League regular season
December 28, 2019; 3:12 pm, ESPN+		Cleveland State	W 71–66	6–8 (1–0)	Credit Union 1 Arena (1,489); Chicago, IL
December 30, 2019; 6:00 pm, ESPN+		Youngstown State	L 64–70	6–9 (1–1)	Credit Union 1 Arena (1,210); Chicago, IL
January 3, 2020; 7:00 pm, ESPN3		at Green Bay	L 71–85	6–10 (1–2)	Resch Center (2,124); Ashwaubenon, WI
January 5, 2020; 1:00 pm, ESPN+		at Milwaukee	L 62–64	6–11 (1–3)	UW–Milwaukee Panther Arena (1,012); Milwaukee, WI
January 10, 2020; 6:00 pm, ESPN2		Northern Kentucky	L 52–68	6–12 (1–4)	Credit Union 1 Arena (1,858); Chicago, IL
January 12, 2020; 3:12 pm, ESPN+		Wright State	W 76–72	7–12 (2–4)	Credit Union 1 Arena (1,277); Chicago, IL
January 18, 2020; 11:00 am, ESPN3		at IUPUI	W 75–66	8–12 (3–4)	Indiana Farmers Coliseum (1,309); Indianapolis, IN
January 23, 2020; 6:00 pm, ESPN+		at Oakland	W 80–50	9–12 (4–4)	Athletics Center O'rena (3,091); Auburn Hills, MI
January 25, 2020; 12:00 pm, ESPN+		at Detroit Mercy	L 69–70	9–13 (4–5)	Calihan Hall (1,866); Detroit, MI
January 30, 2020; 6:00 pm, ESPN+		at Youngstown State	W 90–83 ^{OT}	10–13 (5–5)	Beeghly Center (1,596); Youngstown, OH
February 1, 2020; 2:00 pm, ESPN3		at Cleveland State	W 64–62	11–13 (6–5)	Wolstein Center (1,170); Cleveland, OH
February 6, 2020; 7:00 pm, ESPN3		Milwaukee	L 57–74	11–14 (6–6)	Credit Union 1 Arena (1,995); Chicago, IL
February 8, 2020; 3:12 pm, ESPN3		Green Bay	W 71–58	12–14 (7–6)	Credit Union 1 Arena (2,704); Chicago, IL
February 14, 2020; 8:00 pm, ESPN2		at Wright State	L 58–75	12–15 (7–7)	Nutter Center (4,261); Fairborn, OH
February 16, 2020; 1:00 pm, ESPN+		at Northern Kentucky	W 73–43	13–15 (8–7)	BB&T Arena (3,545); Highland Heights, KY
February 22, 2020; 3:12 pm, ESPN3		IUPUI	W 77–72	14–15 (9–7)	Credit Union 1 Arena (2,040); Chicago, IL
February 27, 2020; 7:00 pm, ESPN+		Detroit Mercy	W 84–67	15–15 (10–7)	Credit Union 1 Arena (2,529); Chicago, IL
February 29, 2020; 3:12 pm, ESPN+		Oakland	L 66–68	15–16 (10–8)	Credit Union 1 Arena (2,237); Chicago, IL
Horizon League tournament
March 3, 2020; 7:00 pm, ESPN+	(4)	(9) IUPUI; First round	W 93–59	16–16	Credit Union 1 Arena (1,426); Chicago, IL
March 5, 2020; 7:00 pm, ESPN+	(4)	(5) Youngstown State; Quarterfinals	W 67–61	17–16	Gentile Arena (642); Chicago, IL
March 9, 2020; 6:00 pm, ESPNU	(4)	vs. (1) Wright State; Semifinals	W 73–56	18–16	Indiana Farmers Coliseum (1,923); Indianapolis, IN
March 10, 2020; 6:00 pm, ESPN	(4)	vs. (2) Northern Kentucky; Championship	L 62–71	18–17	Indiana Farmers Coliseum (1,861); Indianapolis, IN
*Non-conference game. ^{#}Rankings from AP Poll. (#) Tournament seedings in parentheses. All times are in Eastern.
