= 2019–20 IUPUI Jaguars men's basketball team =

American college basketball season

2019–20 IUPUI Jaguars men's basketball
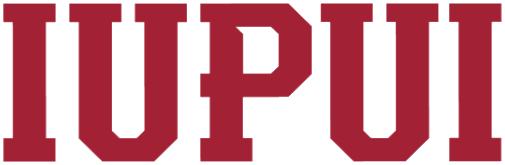
- Conference: Horizon League
- Record: 7–25 (3–15 Horizon)
- Head coach: Byron Rimm II (1st season)
- Assistant coaches: Matt Dunn; Isaac Loechle
- Home arena: Indiana Farmers Coliseum

2019–20 Horizon League men's basketball standings
	Conf.				Overall
Team	W		L	PCT	W		L	PCT
Wright State	15	–	3	.833	25	–	7	.781
Northern Kentucky †	13	–	5	.722	23	–	9	.719
Green Bay	11	–	7	.611	17	–	16	.515
Youngstown State	10	–	8	.556	18	–	15	.545
UIC	10	–	8	.556	18	–	17	.514
Oakland	8	–	10	.444	14	–	19	.424
Cleveland State	7	–	11	.389	11	–	21	.344
Milwaukee	7	–	11	.389	12	–	19	.387
Detroit Mercy*	6	–	12	.333	8	–	23	.258
IUPUI	3	–	15	.167	7	–	25	.219
† 2020 Horizon League Tournament winner * Ineligible for postseason due to APR violations

The 2019–20 IUPUI Jaguars men's basketball team represented Indiana University–Purdue University Indianapolis in the 2019–20 NCAA Division I men's basketball season. The Jaguars, led by interim head coach Byron Rimm II, played their home games at Indiana Farmers Coliseum in Indianapolis, Indiana as members of the Horizon League. They finished the season 7–25, 3–15 in Horizon League play, to finish in last place. They lost in the first round of the Horizon League tournament to UIC.

== Previous season ==
The Jaguars finished the 2018–19 season 16–17 overall, 8–10 in Horizon League play, to finish in a three-way tie for sixth place. In the Horizon League tournament, they were defeated by top-seeded Wright State in the quarterfinals. They received an invitation to the CIT, where they were defeated by Marshall in the first round.

== Offseason ==
In August 2019, Jason Gardner resigned as head basketball coach at IUPUI following an arrest for OWI in Indianapolis. Assistant coach Byron Rimm II was named interim head coach for the season. Rimm then hired Brian Burton to round out the coaching staff for the season.

== Roster ==
2019–20 IUPUI Jaguars men's basketball team
Players
Coaches

Pos.	#	Name	Height	Weight	Year	Hometown
G	0	Jaylen Minnett	6 ft 1 in (1.85 m)	180 lb (82 kg)	Jr	Terre Haute, IN
F	1	Jakoby Kemp	6 ft 8 in (2.03 m)	190 lb (86 kg)	Jr	Layton, UT
G/F	2	Jamil Jackson Jr.	6 ft 6 in (1.98 m)	190 lb (86 kg)	Jr	Minneapolis, MN
G	10	Mike DePersia	5 ft 10 in (1.78 m)	170 lb (77 kg)	Fr	Haddonfield, NJ
F/C	11	Brandon Kenyon	6 ft 10 in (2.08 m)	225 lb (102 kg)	So	Caledonia, ON
G/F	12	Marlon Taylor	6 ft 5 in (1.96 m)	220 lb (100 kg)	RS Fr	South Bend, IN
G/F	13	Isaiah Williams	6 ft 8 in (2.03 m)	225 lb (102 kg)	Jr	Dayton, OH
G	14	Marcus Burk	6 ft 3 in (1.91 m)	205 lb (93 kg)	RS Jr	Indianapolis, IN
F	15	Taveion White	6 ft 7 in (2.01 m)	190 lb (86 kg)	Fr	Prosper, TX
F	20	Sawyer Stoltz	6 ft 9 in (2.06 m)	200 lb (91 kg)	Fr	Huntington, IN
G	23	Grant Weatherford	6 ft 2 in (1.88 m)	195 lb (88 kg)	Jr	Cicero, IN
F	30	Zo Tyson	6 ft 9 in (2.06 m)	195 lb (88 kg)	GS	Fayetteville, NC
F	32	Elyjah Goss	6 ft 7 in (2.01 m)	195 lb (88 kg)	Jr	Bolingbrook, IL

Head coach

- Byron Rimm II (Cal State LA)

Assistant coach(es)

- Matt Dunn (Fort Hays State)
- Isaac Loechle (Anderson (IN))

Legend

- (C) Team captain
- (S) Suspended
- (I) Ineligible
- (W) Walk-on
- Injured
- Current redshirt

Roster
Last update: January 27, 2020

== Schedule and results ==
Date time, TV	Rank^{#}	Opponent^{#}	Result	Record	Site (attendance) city, state
Exhibition
October 23, 2019*; 7:00 p.m.		Tiffin	W 81–77		Indiana Farmers Coliseum (880); Indianapolis, IN
Non-conference regular season
November 6, 2019*; 6:30 p.m., FS2		at Butler	L 47–80	0–1	Hinkle Fieldhouse (7,706); Indianapolis, IN
November 9, 2019*; 8:00 p.m., ESPN+		at Bradley	L 56–90	0–2	Carver Arena (5,518); Peoria, IL
November 11, 2019*; 7:00 p.m., ESPN3		Anderson	W 72–55	1–2	Indiana Farmers Coliseum (1,051); Indianapolis, IN
November 13, 2019*; 7:00 p.m., ESPN3		at South Florida; Cayman Islands Classic campus game	W 70–53	2–2	Yuengling Center (2,474); Tampa, FL
November 20, 2019*; 8:00 p.m., ESPN+		at Loyola–Chicago; Cayman Islands Classic campus game	L 62–85	2–3	Joseph J. Gentile Arena (2,402); Chicago, IL
November 25, 2019*; 5:30 p.m.		vs. Loyola (MD); Cayman Islands Classic — Mainland	L 77–81	2–4	Baxter Arena (269); Omaha, NE
November 26, 2019*; 5:30 p.m.		vs. Southern; Cayman Islands Classic — Mainland	L 77–83	2–5	Baxter Arena (152); Omaha, NE
November 30, 2019*; 7:00 p.m., ESPN+		Evansville	L 64–70	2–6	Indiana Farmers Coliseum (1,659); Indianapolis, IN
December 4, 2019*; 7:00 p.m., ESPN+		at Morehead State	L 51–56	2–7	Ellis Johnson Arena (1,776); Morehead, KY
December 7, 2019*; 1:00 p.m., ESPN+		at Ball State	L 54–102	2–8	Worthen Arena (4,733); Muncie, IN
December 10, 2019*; 7:00 p.m., ESPN3		IU South Bend	W 80–60	3–8	Indiana Farmers Coliseum (1,085); Indianapolis, IN
December 14, 2019*; 12:00 p.m., ESPN+		Purdue Fort Wayne	W 74–65	4–8	Indiana Farmers Coliseum (1,098); Indianapolis, IN
December 20, 2019*; 10:00 p.m.		at Fresno State	L 64–95	4–9	Save Mart Center (4,798); Fresno, CA
Horizon League regular season
December 28, 2019; 12:00 p.m., ESPN+		Youngstown State	L 73–83	4–10 (0–1)	Indiana Farmers Coliseum (868); Indianapolis, IN
December 30, 2019; 7:00 p.m., ESPN+		Cleveland State	L 80–82	4–11 (0–2)	Indiana Farmers Coliseum (889); Indianapolis, IN
January 3, 2020; 8:00 p.m., ESPN3		at Milwaukee	L 74–78	4–12 (0–3)	UW–Milwaukee Panther Arena (977); Milwaukee, WI
January 5, 2020; 2:00 p.m., ESPN+		at Green Bay	W 93–78	5–12 (1–3)	Resch Center (1,666); Ashwaubenon, WI
January 10, 2020; 7:00 p.m., ESPN3		Wright State	L 70–84	5–13 (1–4)	Indiana Farmers Coliseum (1,142); Indianapolis, IN
January 12, 2020; 2:00 p.m., ESPN+		Northern Kentucky	L 71–96	5–14 (1–5)	Indiana Farmers Coliseum (789); Indianapolis, IN
January 18, 2020; 12:00 p.m., ESPN3		UIC	L 66–75	5–15 (1–6)	Indiana Farmers Coliseum (1,309); Indianapolis, IN
January 23, 2020; 7:00 p.m., ESPN+		at Detroit Mercy	L 64–76	5–16 (1–7)	Calihan Hall (1,624); Detroit, MI
January 25, 2020; 3:00 p.m., ESPN3		at Oakland	W 89–85 ^{OT}	6–16 (2–7)	Athletics Center O'rena (3,644); Auburn Hills, MI
January 30, 2020; 7:00 p.m., ESPN+		at Cleveland State	L 62–72	6–17 (2–8)	Wolstein Center (1,241); Cleveland, OH
February 1, 2020; 6:00 p.m., ESPN3		at Youngstown State	L 76–91	6–18 (2–9)	Beeghly Center (4,633); Youngstown, OH
February 6, 2020; 11:00 a.m., ESPN+		Green Bay	L 85–91	6–19 (2–10)	Indiana Farmers Coliseum (2,394); Indianapolis, IN
February 8, 2020; 12:00 p.m., ESPN+		Milwaukee	L 79–80 ^{OT}	6–20 (2–11)	Indiana Farmers Coliseum (1,007); Indianapolis, IN
February 14, 2020; 7:00 p.m., ESPN+		at Northern Kentucky	L 70–84	6–21 (2–12)	BB&T Arena (3,013); Highland Heights, KY
February 16, 2020; 2:00 p.m., ESPN+		at Wright State	L 66–106	6–22 (2–13)	Nutter Center (6,003); Fairborn, OH
February 22, 2020; 4:12 p.m., ESPN3		at UIC	L 72–77	6–23 (2–14)	Credit Union 1 Arena (2,040); Chicago, IL
February 27, 2020; 7:00 p.m., ESPN+		Oakland	W 71–68	7–23 (3–14)	Indiana Farmers Coliseum (1,118); Indianapolis, IN
February 29, 2020; 12:00 p.m., ESPN+		Detroit Mercy	L 88–90	7–24 (3–15)	Indiana Farmers Coliseum (1,252); Indianapolis, IN
Horizon League tournament
March 3, 2020; 7:00 p.m., ESPN+	(9)	at (4) UIC; First round	L 59–93	7–25	Credit Union 1 Arena (1,426); Chicago, IL
*Non-conference game. ^{#}Rankings from AP poll. (#) Tournament seedings in parentheses. All times are in Eastern.
