= IU Indy Jaguars men's basketball =

Men's basketball team representing Indiana-Purdue University

2026–27 IU Indy Jaguars men's basketball team
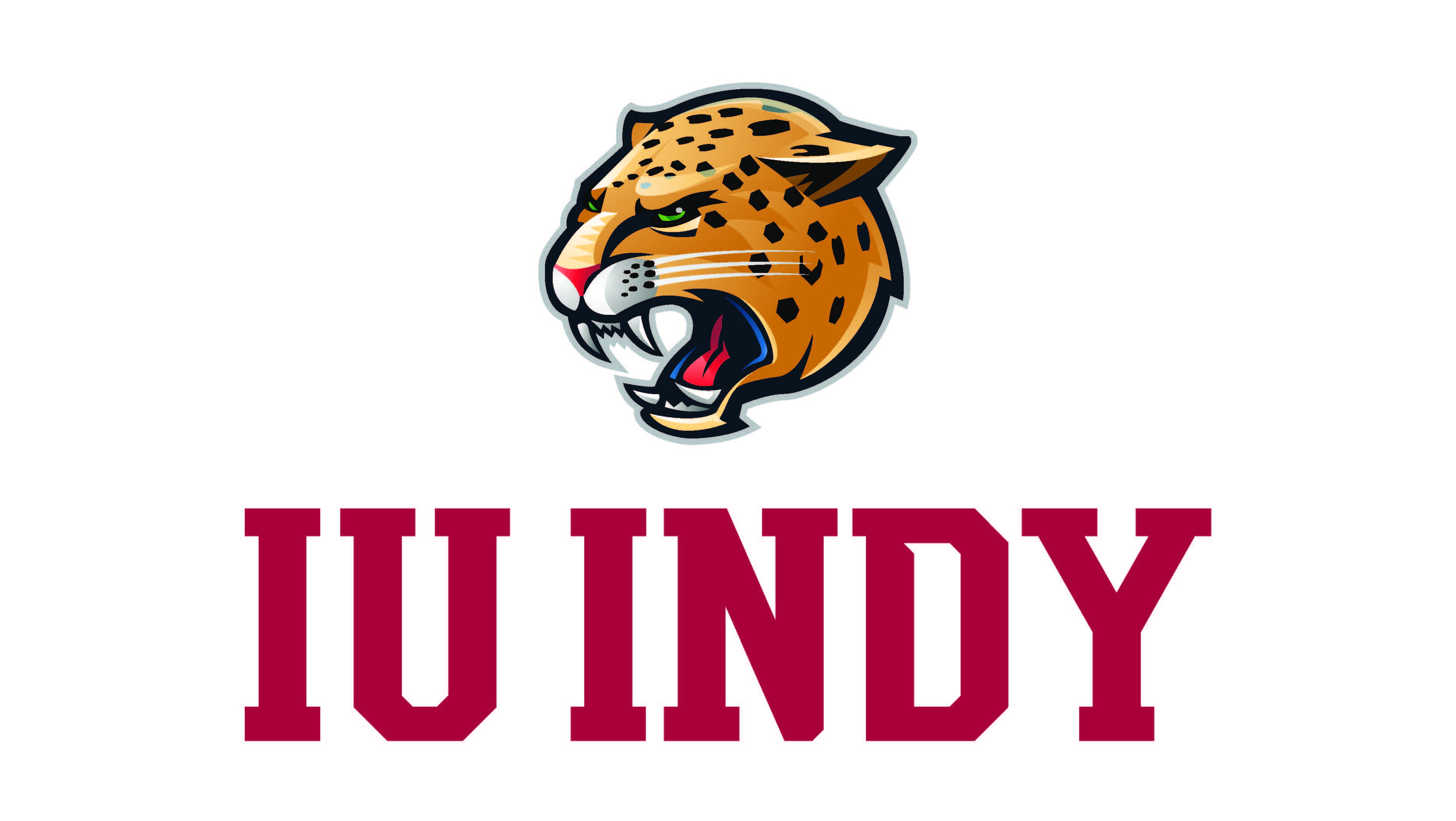
- University: Indiana University Indianapolis
- Head coach: Ben Howlett (2nd season)
- Location: Indianapolis, Indiana
- Arena: James T. Morris Arena (capacity: 4,500)
- Conference: Horizon League
- Nickname: Jaguars
- Colors: Red, gold, and black
- Student section: Red Zone

NCAA Division I tournament appearances
- 2003

Conference tournament champions
- Summit: 2003

Conference regular-season champions
- Summit: 2006

Uniforms
Home	Away

The IU Indy Jaguars men's basketball team is the men's basketball team that represents Indiana University Indianapolis in Indianapolis, Indiana, United States. IU Indy assumed its current identity on July 1, 2024, when the Indiana University and Purdue University systems dissolved the former Indiana University–Purdue University Indianapolis (IUPUI). The vast majority of IUPUI academic programs, plus the IUPUI athletic program, were transferred to the new IU campus. The school's team currently competes in the Horizon League. The Jaguars made their first and to date only appearance in the NCAA Tournament in 2003 when they won the Summit League Conference Championship.

== History ==
The first year of IU Indy basketball, then under the IUPUI identity, was 1971–72 and the school competed as an NCAA Division III Independent. From 1982 to 2014, the Jaguars played on campus at The Jungle, which seated 1,215. Beginning with the 2014–15 season, the Jaguars played their home games at what is now named Corteva Coliseum at the State Fairgrounds. Prior to the Jaguars' move, the arena underwent a $63 million renovation to modernize it for the fair and for basketball. The renovated arena has capacity for 6,800.

The Jaguars joined the Horizon League on July 1, 2017, replacing Valparaiso, which left the conference on the same day.

On March 25, 2024, IUPUI hired former University of Indianapolis head coach Paul Corsaro to become the 11th head coach in program history and the first IU Indy head coach. Corsaro was fired after posting an 10–22 record that season and replaced by Ben Howlett, who arrived after eight seasons as head coach of NCAA Division II West Liberty.

The Jaguars will open a new on-campus venue, James T. Morris Arena, for the 2026–27 season.

=== Conference affiliations ===
Years	Conference	Seasons
1973–74 to 1977–78	NCAA D-III Independent	5
1978–79 to 1992–93	NAIA Independent	15
1993–94 to 1997–98	NCAA D-II Independent	5
1998–99 to 2016–17	Summit League	19
2017–18 to present	Horizon League	7

== Postseason ==
=== NCAA tournament results ===
The Jaguars have appeared in one NCAA tournament. Their record is 0–1.

Year	Seed	Round	Opponent	Result
2003	No. 16	First Round	No. 1 Kentucky	L 64–95

=== NAIA tournament results ===
The Jaguars have appeared in the NAIA Tournament two times. Their record is 1–2.

Year	Round	Opponent	Result
1985	First Round	Wisconsin-Stevens Point	L 61–71
1990	First Round; Second Round	Siena Heights; Pfeiffer	W 87–80; L 86–92

=== CBI results ===
The Jaguars have appeared in one College Basketball Invitational (CBI). Their record is 1–1.

Year	Round	Opponent	Result
2010	First Round; Quarterfinals	Hofstra; Princeton	W 74–60; L 68–74 ^{2OT}

=== CIT results ===
The Jaguars have appeared in the CollegeInsider.com Postseason Tournament (CIT) one time. Their record is 0–1.

Year	Round	Opponent	Result
2019	First Round	Marshall	L 83–87

== Record year-by-year ==
Record table
Season	Coach	Overall	Conference	Standing	Postseason
Ron Hunter (Summit League) (1998–2011)
1998–99	Ron Hunter	11–16	6–8	T–5th	
1999–00	Ron Hunter	7–21	4–12	8th	
2000–01	Ron Hunter	11–18	6–10	6th	
2001–02	Ron Hunter	15–15	6–8	6th	
2002–03	Ron Hunter	20–14	10–4	T–2nd	NCAA first round
2003–04	Ron Hunter	21–11	10–6	2nd	
2004–05	Ron Hunter	16–13	9–7	4th	
2005–06	Ron Hunter	19–10	13–3	T–1st	
2006–07	Ron Hunter	15–15	7–7	4th	
2007–08	Ron Hunter	26–7	15–3	2nd	
2008–09	Ron Hunter	16–14	9–9	4th	
2009–10	Ron Hunter	25–11	15–3	2nd	CBI quarterfinals
2010–11	Ron Hunter	19–14	12–6	3rd	
Ron Hunter:		221–179 (.553)	122–86 (.720)		
Todd Howard (Summit League) (2011–2014)
2011–12	Todd Howard	14–18	7–11	7th	
2012–13	Todd Howard	6–26	1–15	9th	
2013–14	Todd Howard	6–26	1–13	8th	
Todd Howard:		26–70 (.271)	9–39 (.188)		
Jason Gardner (Summit League) (2014–2017)
2014–15	Jason Gardner	10–21	6–10	T–6th	
2015–16	Jason Gardner	13–19	9–7	4th	
2016–17	Jason Gardner	14–18	7–9	7th	
Jason Gardner (Horizon League) (2017–2019)
2017–18	Jason Gardner	11–19	8–10	T-5th	
2018–19	Jason Gardner	16–17	8–10	6th	
Jason Gardner:		64–94 (.405)	38–46 (.452)		
Byron Rimm (Horizon League) (2019–2021)
2019–20	Byron Rimm	7–25	3–15	10th	
2020–21	Byron Rimm	8–10	7–9	7th	
Byron Rimm:		15–35 (.300)	10–24 (.294)		
Matt Crenshaw (Horizon League) (2021–2024)
2021–22	Matt Crenshaw	3–26	1–16	12th	
2022–23	Matt Crenshaw	5–27	2–18	10th	
2023–24	Matt Crenshaw	6–26	2–18	10th	
Matt Crenshaw:		14–79 (.151)	5–52 (.088)		
Paul Corsaro (Horizon League) (2024–2025)
2024–25	Paul Corsaro	10–22	6–14	9th	
Paul Corsaro:		10–22 (.313)	6–14 (.300)		
Ben Howlett (Horizon League) (2025–present)
2025–26	Ben Howlett	7–25	3–17	11th	
Ben Howlett:		7–25 (.219)	3–17 (.150)		
Total:		357–504 (.415)	190–249 (.433)		
National champion Postseason invitational champion Conference regular season champion Conference regular season and conference tournament champion Division regular season champion Division regular season and conference tournament champion Conference tournament champion

- IUPUI joined NCAA Division I beginning in the 1998–99 season. Non-Division I seasons are not included.
- IUPUI vacated the records of eight conference games in 2003–04, nine games in 2004–05, and seven games in 2006–07 as a result of NCAA sanctions. The Summit League also sanctioned IUPUI one conference game in 2008–09. Vacated games are included in this table.

== Notable players ==
In 2008, guard George Hill skipped his final year of eligibility and entered the NBA draft, in which he was selected by the San Antonio Spurs, becoming the first player drafted from IUPUI.
