= Cleveland State Vikings men's basketball statistical leaders =

Statistical leaders of Cleveland State Vikings men's basketball team

The Cleveland State Vikings men's basketball statistical leaders are individual statistical leaders of the Cleveland State Vikings men's basketball program in various categories, including points, rebounds, assists, steals, and blocks. Within those areas, the lists identify single-game, single-season, and career leaders. The Vikings represent Cleveland State University in the NCAA's Horizon League.

Cleveland State began competing in intercollegiate basketball in 1929. However, the school's record book does not generally list records from before the 1950s, as records from before this period are often incomplete and inconsistent. Since scoring was much lower in this era, and teams played much fewer games during a typical season, it is likely that few or no players from this era would appear on these lists anyway.

The NCAA did not officially record assists as a stat until the 1983–84 season, and blocks and steals until the 1985–86 season, but Cleveland State's record books includes players in these stats before these seasons. These lists are updated through the end of the 2020–21 season.

== Scoring ==
Career
Rk	Player	Points	Seasons
1	Ken McFadden	2,256	1985–86 1986–87 1987–88 1988–89
2	Franklin Edwards	2,235	1977–78 1978–79 1979–80 1980–81
3	Norris Cole	1,978	2007–08 2008–09 2009–10 2010–11
4	Clinton Ransey	1,946	1983–84 1984–85 1985–86 1986–87
5	J'Nathan Bullock	1,800	2005–06 2006–07 2007–08 2008–09
6	James Madison	1,576	1996–97 1997–98 1998–99 1999–00
7	Theo Dixon	1,572	1997–98 1998–99 1999–00 2000–01 2001–02
8	Darren Tillis	1,423	1978–79 1979–80 1980–81 1981–82
9	Jermaine Robinson	1,408	2000–01 2001–02 2002–03 2003–04
	Weldon Kytle	1,408	1961–62 1962–63 1963–64 1964–65

Season
Rk	Player	Points	Season
1	Norris Cole	780	2010–11
2	Ken McFadden	708	1986–87
3	Tristan Enaruna	687	2023–24
4	Franklin Edwards	664	1980–81
5	Franklin Edwards	637	1979–80
6	Ken McFadden	615	1987–88
7	Dave Kyle	613	1975–76
8	Theo Dixon	577	2000–01
9	Damon Stringer	573	1999–00
10	Jermaine Robinson	568	2003–04

Single game
Rk	Player	Points	Season	Opponent
1	Franklin Edwards	49	1980–81	Xavier
2	Damon Stringer	47	1999–00	Milwaukee
3	D'Moi Hodge	46	2020–21	Purdue Fort Waye
4	Norris Cole	41	2010–11	Youngstown State
	Ken McFadden	41	1986–87	UIC
	Dave Jacklitch	41	1950–51	Hiram
7	J'Nathan Bullock	39	2007–08	Green Bay
	Franklin Edwards	39	1979–80	Florida State
9	Norris Cole	38	2009–10	Florida A&M
	Omari Westley	38	2004–05	Green Bay
	Franklin Edwards	38	1980–81	South Carolina
	Wilbur Starks	38	1974–75	Youngstown State

== Rebounds ==
Career
Rk	Player	Rebounds	Seasons
1	Weldon Kytle	1,241	1961–62 1962–63 1963–64 1964–65
2	Darren Tillis	1,045	1978–79 1979–80 1980–81 1981–82
3	Dennis Lenk	935	1963–64 1964–65 1965–66 1966–67
4	Warren Bradley	908	1984–85 1985–86 1986–87 1987–88 1988–89
5	Eric Mudd	907	1983–84 1984–85 1985–86 1986–87 1987–88
6	Deante Johnson	826	2018–19 2019–20 2020–21 2021–22 2022–23
7	J'Nathan Bullock	816	2005–06 2006–07 2007–08 2008–09
8	Dave Kyle	726	1974–75 1975–76 1976–77
9	Anton Grady	724	2011–12 2012–13 2013–14 2014–15
10	Juan Hill	714	1991–92 1992–93 1993–94 1994–95

Season
Rk	Player	Rebounds	Season
1	Darren Tillis	346	1981–82
2	Weldon Kytle	333	1963–64
	Weldon Kytle	333	1962–63
4	Dave Kyle	325	1975–76
5	Darren Tillis	309	1980–81
6	Dave Kyle	294	1976–77
7	Warren Bradley	292	1986–87
8	Eric Mudd	288	1987–88
	Weldon Kytle	288	1964–65
10	Warren Bradley	287	1988–89
	Weldon Kytle	287	1961–62

Single game
Rk	Player	Rebounds	Season	Opponent
1	Weldon Kytle	30	1963–64	Malone
2	Weldon Kytle	27	1962–63	Fredonia
3	Weldon Kytle	26	1964–65	Thiel
	Weldon Kytle	26	1963–64	Western Reserve
	Weldon Kytle	26	1962–63	Cedarville
	Weldon Kytle	26	1962–63	Ashland
7	Weldon Kytle	25	1964–65	Case Tech
	Ernie Kremling	25	1960–61	Allegheny

== Assists ==
Career
Rk	Player	Assists	Seasons
1	Ken McFadden	463	1985–86 1986–87 1987–88 1988–89
2	Franklin Edwards	459	1977–78 1978–79 1979–80 1980–81
3	Charlie Lee	458	2011–12 2012–13 2013–14 2014–15
4	Norris Cole	455	2007–08 2008–09 2009–10 2010–11
	Craig Caldwell	455	1991–92 1992–93 1993–94 1994–95
6	Eddie Bryant	435	1983–84 1984–85 1985–86 1986–87
7	Gravelle Craig	425	1990–91 1991–92 1992–93
8	Kenny Robertson	420	1986–87 1987–88 1988–89 1989–90
9	Shawn Hood	395	1983–84 1984–85 1985–86 1986–87
10	Walt Chavis	381	2001–02 2002–03 2003–04 2004–05

Season
Rk	Player	Assists	Season
1	Cedric Jackson	199	2008–09
2	Norris Cole	191	2010–11
3	Ken McFadden	177	1987–88
4	Cedric Jackson	168	2007–08
5	Gravelle Craig	167	1992–93
6	Tyree Appleby	162	2018–19
7	Gravelle Craig	160	1991–92
8	Jim Les	159	1981–82
9	Charlie Lee	153	2012–13
10	Kenny Robertson	149	1989–90

Single game
Rk	Player	Assists	Season	Opponent
1	Ken McFadden	16	1988–89	Northern Iowa
2	Jim Les	15	1981–82	Louisville
	Chuck Spieles	15	1973–74	Youngstown State
4	Gravelle Craig	14	1991–92	Akron
	Jim Les	14	1981–82	UIC
6	Kenny Robertson	13	1989–90	Fla. International
7	Walt Chavis	12	2002–03	Green Bay
	Craig Caldwell	12	1993–94	Eastern Illinois
	Carlos English	12	2005–06	Michigan State
	Lee Reed	12	1982–83	Akron
	Jim Les	12	1981–82	Denison
	Jim Les	12	1981–82	Xavier

== Steals ==
Career
Rk	Player	Steals	Seasons
1	Kenny Robertson	341	1986–87 1987–88 1988–89 1989–90
2	Ken McFadden	245	1985–86 1986–87 1987–88 1988–89
3	Clinton Ransey	240	1983–84 1984–85 1985–86 1986–87
4	Shawn Hood	227	1983–84 1984–85 1985–86 1986–87
5	Franklin Edwards	217	1977–78 1978–79 1979–80 1980–81
6	D'Aundray Brown	209	2007–08 2008–09 2009–10 2011–12
7	Norris Cole	207	2007–08 2008–09 2009–10 2010–11
8	Eddie Bryant	201	1983–84 1984–85 1985–86 1986–87
9	Cedric Jackson	200	2007–08 2008–09
10	Mike Sweeney	178	1978–79 1979–80 1980–81 1981–82

Season
Rk	Player	Steals	Season
1	Cedric Jackson	112	2008–09
2	Kenny Robertson	111	1988–89
3	Kenny Robertson	90	1987–88
4	Cedric Jackson	88	2007–08
5	Ken McFadden	83	1986–87
6	D'Aundray Brown	81	2009–10
7	Norris Cole	80	2010–11
8	Kenny Robertson	79	1989–90
9	Clinton Ransey	76	1986–87
10	Eddie Bryant	71	1986–87

Single game
Rk	Player	Steals	Season	Opponent
1	Kenny Robertson	12	1988–89	Wagner
2	Kenny Robertson	10	1988–89	Northern Iowa
3	Craig Caldwell	8	1994–95	Wright State
	Kenny Robertson	8	1988–89	UIC
	Kenny Robertson	8	1987–88	Western Illinois
	Ken McFadden	8	1986–87	Canisius

== Blocks ==
Career
Rk	Player	Blocks	Seasons
1	Darren Tillis	197	1978–79 1979–80 1980–81 1981–82
2	Tahric Gosley	180	1999–00 2000–01 2001–02 2002–03
3	Deante Johnson	156	2018–19 2019–20 2020–21 2021–22 2022–23
4	Pape Badiane	138	2000–01 2001–02 2002–03 2003–04
5	Anton Grady	129	2011–12 2012–13 2013–14 2014–15
6	Shawn Fergus	117	1989–90 1990–91 1991–92 1992–93
7	Marlin Mason	100	2011–12 2012–13 2013–14 2014–15
8	Dylan Arnett	95	2022–23 2023–24 2024–25
9	George Tandy	74	2007–08 2008–09
10	Tristan Enaruna	71	2022–23 2023–24

Season
Rk	Player	Blocks	Season
1	Tahric Gosley	64	2000–01
2	Pape Badiane	57	2002–03
3	Darren Tillis	51	1978–79
4	Darren Tillis	50	1981–82
5	Tahric Gosley	49	2002–03
6	Darren Tillis	48	1980–81
	Darren Tillis	48	1979–80
8	Anton Grady	47	2014–15
	Pape Badiane	47	2003–04
10	Dylan Arnett	46	2024–25

Single game
Rk	Player	Blocks	Season	Opponent
1	KJ Debrick	7	2024–25	Midway University
	Pape Badiane	7	2002–03	Butler
	Brian Parker	7	1988–89	Slippery Rock
	Gale Drummer	7	1972–73	Wichita State
5	Tevin Smith	6	2024–25	Robert Morris
	Anton Grady	6	2014–15	UIC
	Anton Grady	6	2011–12	Rio Grande
	Kevin Francis	6	2006–07	West Virginia Tech
