= 2006–07 Butler Bulldogs men's basketball team =

American college basketball season

2006–07 Butler Bulldogs men's basketball
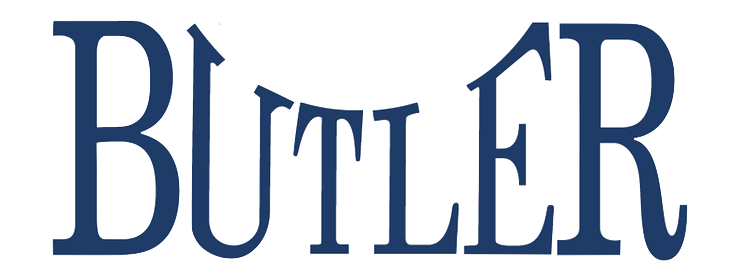

NIT Season Tip-Off champion Wooden Tradition winner Horizon League regular season co-champion

NCAA Tournament, Sweet Sixteen
- Conference: Horizon League

Ranking
- Coaches: No. 13
- AP: No. 21
- Record: 29–7 (13–3 Horizon)
- Head coach: Todd Lickliter (6th season)
- Assistant coaches: Matthew Graves; LaVall Jordan; Brad Stevens
- MVP: Brandon Crone
- Captains: Brandon Crone; Brian Ligon
- Home arena: Hinkle Fieldhouse

2006–07 Horizon League men's basketball standings
	Conf.				Overall
Team	W		L	PCT	W		L	PCT
No. 21 Butler	13	–	3	.813	29	–	7	.806
Wright State †	13	–	3	.813	23	–	10	.697
Loyola (IL)	10	–	6	.625	21	–	11	.656
Green Bay	7	–	9	.438	18	–	15	.545
Youngstown State	7	–	9	.438	14	–	17	.452
UIC	7	–	9	.438	14	–	18	.438
Detroit	6	–	10	.375	11	–	19	.367
Milwaukee	6	–	10	.375	9	–	22	.290
Cleveland State	3	–	13	.188	10	–	21	.323
† 2007 Horizon League Tournament winner As of August 1, 2010; Rankings from AP Poll

The 2006–07 Butler Bulldogs men's basketball team represented Butler University in the 2006–07 NCAA Division I men's basketball season. Their head coach was Todd Lickliter, serving his 6th year. The Bulldogs played their home games at the Hinkle Fieldhouse.

The Bulldogs won a share of the 2007 Horizon League Men's Basketball Regular Season Championship title and earned an at-large bid to the 2007 NCAA Division I men's basketball tournament, earning a 5 seed in the Midwest Region. They beat 12 seed Old Dominion 57–46 and 4 seed Maryland before falling to 1 seed and eventual national champion Florida 65–57 in overtime in the Sweet Sixteen

== Roster ==
2006–07 Butler Bulldogs men's basketball team
Players
Coaches

Pos.	#	Name	Height	Weight	Year	Hometown
G/F	1	Julian Betko	6 ft 5 in (1.96 m)	200 lb (91 kg)	Jr	Ružomberok, Slovakia
F	34	Pete Campbell	6 ft 7 in (2.01 m)	200 lb (91 kg)	Jr	Muncie, IN
F	33	Brandon Crone (C)	6 ft 6 in (1.98 m)	225 lb (102 kg)	Sr	Frankfort, IN
F/C	50	Elliot Engelmann	6 ft 7 in (2.01 m)	205 lb (93 kg)	Fr	Downers Grove, IL
G	4	A. J. Graves	6 ft 1 in (1.85 m)	155 lb (70 kg)	Jr	Switz City, IN
G	10	Mike Green	6 ft 1 in (1.85 m)	175 lb (79 kg)	Jr	Philadelphia, PA
F	24	Brian Ligon (C)	6 ft 7 in (2.01 m)	240 lb (109 kg)	Sr	St. Petersburg, FL
G	23	Marcus Nellems	6 ft 4 in (1.93 m)	200 lb (91 kg)	Sr	Fort Wayne, IN
G	14	Nick Rodgers (W)	6 ft 1 in (1.85 m)	162 lb (73 kg)	Fr	Noblesville, IN
G	5	Ben Slaton (W)	6 ft 1 in (1.85 m)	160 lb (73 kg)	So	Columbus, IN
G/F	32	Drew Streicher	6 ft 7 in (2.01 m)	200 lb (91 kg)	Jr	Washington, IN
G/F	21	Willie Veasley	6 ft 3 in (1.91 m)	204 lb (93 kg)	Fr	Freeport, IL

Head coach

- Todd Lickliter (Butler)

Assistant coach(es)

- Matthew Graves (Butler)
- LaVall Jordan (Butler)
- Brad Stevens (DePauw)

Legend

- (C) Team captain
- (S) Suspended
- (I) Ineligible
- (W) Walk-on
- Injured
- Current redshirt

Roster
Last update: 12 May 2010

== Schedule ==
Date time, TV	Rank^{#}	Opponent^{#}	Result	Record	Site city, state
Non-conference regular season
Nov 10, 2006*; 9:30		at Tulane	W 77–37	1–0	Fogelman Arena (2,110); New Orleans, LA
Nov 13, 2006*; 6:00, ESPNU		vs. Notre Dame; NIT Pre-Season Tip-Off Opening Round	W 71–69	2–0	Conseco Fieldhouse (8,037); Indianapolis, IN
Nov 14, 2006*; 9:00, ESPN		vs. Indiana; NIT Pre-Season Tip-Off Quarterfinals	W 60–55	3–0	Conseco Fieldhouse (9,594); Indianapolis, IN
Nov 18, 2006*		Illinois-Springfield	W 62–56	4–0	Hinkle Fieldhouse (2,272); Indianapolis, IN
Nov 22, 2006*; 7:00, ESPN2		vs. No. 21 Tennessee; NIT Pre-Season Tip-Off Semifinals	W 56–44	5–0	Madison Square Garden (9,123); New York, NY
Nov 24, 2006*; 7:00, ESPN2		vs. No. 23 Gonzaga; NIT Pre-Season Tip-Off Championship	W 79–71	6–0	Madison Square Garden (9,498); New York, NY
Nov 25, 2006*; 7:00		Kent State	W 83–80 ^{2OT}	7–0	Hinkle Fieldhouse (3,657); Indianapolis, In
Nov 29, 2006*; 8:05	No. 18	at Valparaiso	W 60–47	8–0	Athletics-Recreation Center (4,578); Valparaiso, IN
Dec 2, 2006; 8:00	No. 18	Cleveland St.	W 70–45	9–0 (1–0)	Hinkle Fieldhouse (5,405); Indianapolis, IN
Dec 6, 2006*; 7:00	No. 14	Ball State	W 65–41	10–0	Hinkle Fieldhouse (7,051); Indianapolis, IN
Dec 9, 2006*; 7:05	No. 14	at Indiana St.	L 64–72	10–1	Hulman Center (6,536); Terre Haute, IN
Dec 16, 2006*; 1:00	No. 18	vs. Purdue; Wooden Tradition	W 68–65	11–1	Conseco Fieldhouse (18,356); Indianapolis, IN
Dec 22, 2006*; 7:05	No. 16	Evansville	W 76–65	12–1	Hinkle Fieldhouse (8,027); Indianapolis, IN
Horizon League Play
Dec 30, 2006; 8:00	No. 15	at Milwaukee	W 55–50	13–1 (2–0)	U.S. Cellular Arena (4,194); Milwaukee, WI
Jan 6, 2007; 2:00	No. 13	Wright State	W 73–42	14–1 (3–0)	Hinkle Fieldhouse (5,902); Indianapolis, IN
Jan 10, 2007; 8:00	No. 12	at UIC	L 67–73 ^{OT}	14–2 (3–1)	UIC Pavilion (5,016); Chicago, IL
Jan 13, 2007*; 2:00	No. 12	South Dakota St.	W 67–39	15–2	Hinkle Fieldhouse (4,170); Indianapolis, IN
Jan 17, 2007; 7:00	No. 15	Youngstown St.	W 67–39	16–2 (4–1)	Hinkle Fieldhouse (3,660); Indianapolis, IN
Jan 20, 2007; 2:00	No. 15	Green Bay	W 80–59	17–2 (5–1)	Hinkle Fieldhouse (7,464); Indianapolis, IN
Jan 25, 2007; 8:00	No. 15	at Loyola	W 70–66 ^{OT}	18–2 (6–1)	Joseph J. Gentile Center (4,723); Chicago, IL
Jan 27, 2007; 4:05	No. 11	at Detroit	W 68–58	19–2 (7–1)	Calihan Hall (4,637); Detroit, MI
Jan 29, 2007; 7:00	No. 11	UIC	W 71–45	20–2 (8–1)	Hinkle Fieldhouse (4,766); Indianapolis, IN
Jan 31, 2007; 7:05	No. 11	at Youngstown St.	W 71–58	21–2 (9–1)	Beeghly Center (3,773); Youngstown, OH
Feb 3, 2007; 2:00	No. 11	Milwaukee	W 66–47	22–2 (10–1)	Hinkle Fieldhouse (9,086); Indianapolis, IN
Feb 8, 2007; 7:00	No. 9	at Cleveland St.	W 92–50	23–2 (11–1)	Wolstein Center (3,795); Cleveland, OH
Feb 10, 2007; 7:00	No. 9	at Wright St.	L 65–77	23–3 (11–2)	Nutter Center (10,827); Dayton, OH
Feb 13, 2007*; 7:00	No. 12	Florida Gulf Coast	W 79–65	24–3	Hinkle Fieldhouse (3,181); Indianapolis, IN
Feb 17, 2007*; 4:00, ESPN2	No. 12	No. 16 Southern Illinois; BracketBuster	L 64–68	24–4	Hinkle Fieldhouse (10,827); Indianapolis, IN
Feb 19, 2007; 8:05	No. 15	at Green Bay	W 68–58	25–4 (12–2)	Resch Center (5,307); Green Bay, WI
Feb 22, 2007; 9:00, ESPNU	No. 15	Loyola	L 71–75	25–5 (12–3)	Hinkle Fieldhouse (4,140); Indianapolis, IN
Feb 24, 2007; 2:00	No. 15	Detroit	W 56–36	26–5 (13–3)	Hinkle Fieldhouse (6,397); Indianapolis, IN
Horizon League tournament
Mar 3, 2007; 5:00, ESPNU	(2) No. 16	vs. (3) Loyola; Semifinals	W 67–66 ^{OT}	27–5	Nutter Center (9,128); Dayton, OH
Mar 6, 2007; 9:00, ESPN	(2) No. 17	at (1) Wright St. Championship	L 55–60	27–6	Nutter Center (10,686); Dayton, OH
NCAA tournament
Mar 15, 2007*; 2:40, CBS	(5 MW) No. 19	vs. (12 MW) Old Dominion; First Round	W 57–46	28–6	HSBC Arena (18,649); Buffalo, NY
Mar 17, 2007*; 3:20, CBS	(5 MW) No. 19	vs. (4 MW) No. 18 Maryland; Second Round	W 62–59	29–6	HSBC Arena (18,801); Buffalo, NY
Mar 23, 2007*; 7:10, CBS	(5 MW) No. 19	vs. (1 MW) No. 3 Florida; Sweet Sixteen	L 57–65	29–7	Edward Jones Dome (26,307); Saint Louis, MO
*Non-conference game. ^{#}Rankings from AP Poll. (#) Tournament seedings in parentheses. MW=Midwest Region. All times are in Eastern Time.

== Rankings ==
Ranking movement Legend: ██ Improvement in ranking. ██ Decrease in ranking.
Poll	Pre	Wk 1	Wk 2	Wk 3	Wk 4	Wk 5	Wk 6	Wk 7	Wk 8	Wk 9	Wk 10	Wk 11	Wk 12	Wk 13	Wk 14	Wk 15	Wk 16	WK 17	Final
AP	–	–	RV	19	15	18	16	15	13	12	18	14	13	10	13	15	18	19	21
Coaches	–	–	RV	18	14	18	16	15	13	12	15	11	11	9	12	15	16	17	19
