= 2006–07 Milwaukee Panthers men's basketball team =

American college basketball season

2006–07 Milwaukee Panthers men's basketball
- Conference: Horizon League
- Record: 9–22 (6–10 Horizon)
- Head coach: Rob Jeter (2nd season)
- Assistant coaches: Duffy Conroy (3rd season); Chad Boudreau (2nd season)
- Home arena: U.S. Cellular Arena

2006–07 Horizon League men's basketball standings
	Conf.				Overall
Team	W		L	PCT	W		L	PCT
No. 21 Butler	13	–	3	.813	29	–	7	.806
Wright State †	13	–	3	.813	23	–	10	.697
Loyola (IL)	10	–	6	.625	21	–	11	.656
Green Bay	7	–	9	.438	18	–	15	.545
Youngstown State	7	–	9	.438	14	–	17	.452
UIC	7	–	9	.438	14	–	18	.438
Detroit	6	–	10	.375	11	–	19	.367
Milwaukee	6	–	10	.375	9	–	22	.290
Cleveland State	3	–	13	.188	10	–	21	.323
† 2007 Horizon League Tournament winner As of August 1, 2010; Rankings from AP Poll

The 2006–07 Milwaukee Panthers men's basketball team represented the University of Wisconsin–Milwaukee during the 2006–07 NCAA Division I men's basketball season. The Panthers, led by second-year head coach Rob Jeter, played their home games at the UW–Milwaukee Panther Arena as members of the Horizon League. They finished the season 9-22, 6–10 in Horizon League play to finish in seventh place. They lost in the first round of the Horizon League tournament to University of Illinois Chicago.

== Previous season ==
The Panthers finished the 2005–06 season 22–9, 12–4 in Horizon League play to finish in first place. The team was automatically placed in the semifinals round of the Horizon League tournament, beating Loyola University Chicago 80-66 to advance to the Horizon League Finals. The Panthers then beat Butler University 87-71, granting Milwaukee an automatic bid into the 2006 NCAA Division I men's basketball tournament for the third time in history, and second time in a row.

Seeded eleventh, the Panthers beat sixth seeded Oklahoma 82-74. After their upset win, the Panthers faced third seeded and eventual champions Florida, losing 60-82.

== Roster ==
2007–08 Milwaukee Panthers men's basketball team
Players
Coaches

Pos.	#	Name	Height	Weight	Year	Hometown
G	0	Avery Smith	6 ft 3 in (1.91 m)	175 lb (79 kg)	Jr	Milwaukee, Wisconsin
F	1	Kevin Massiah	6 ft 5 in (1.96 m)	215 lb (98 kg)	Sr	Toronto, Ontario
G	3	Charlie Swiggett	6 ft 1 in (1.85 m)	180 lb (82 kg)	Fr	Chester, Pennsylvania
G	5	Ricky Franklin	6 ft 1 in (1.85 m)	200 lb (91 kg)	So	Milwaukee, Wisconsin
G	10	Zach Holt	5 ft 6 in (1.68 m)	160 lb (73 kg)	Fr	Pulaski, Tennessee
G	12	Allan Hanson	6 ft 0 in (1.83 m)	170 lb (77 kg)	Jr	Wauwatosa, Wisconsin
G	20	Myles McKay	6 ft 3 in (1.91 m)	180 lb (82 kg)	So	Menomonee Falls, Wisconsin
G	21	Roman Gentry	6 ft 4 in (1.93 m)	195 lb (88 kg)	Fr	Sioux City, Iowa
G	22	Kaylan Anderson	6 ft 5 in (1.96 m)	195 lb (88 kg)	Fr	Toronto, Ontario
G	23	Jason Deutchman (W)	6 ft 6 in (1.98 m)	205 lb (93 kg)	Fr	Los Angeles, California
F	24	Marcus Skinner	6 ft 6 in (1.98 m)	215 lb (98 kg)	Jr	Flint, Michigan
F	25	Paige Paulsen	6 ft 7 in (2.01 m)	220 lb (100 kg)	Jr	Custer, South Dakota
G	33	Nick Hansen	6 ft 5 in (1.96 m)	200 lb (91 kg)	Sr	Appleton, Wisconsin
F	34	Ryan Thornton	6 ft 7 in (2.01 m)	185 lb (84 kg)	Fr	Chillicothe, Illinois
F	40	Michael Bendall	6 ft 7 in (2.01 m)	210 lb (95 kg)	Jr	Oconomowoc, Wisconsin
F/C	45	Sam Mauldin	6 ft 9 in (2.06 m)	245 lb (111 kg)	Jr	Wedowee, Alabama
F	52	Jason Averkamp	6 ft 6 in (1.98 m)	230 lb (104 kg)	Fr	New Berlin, Wisconsin
G	**44	Joe Allen (I)	6 ft 6 in (1.98 m)	230 lb (104 kg)	Jr	Milwaukee, Wisconsin
G	**15	Deion James (I)	6 ft 2 in (1.88 m)	190 lb (86 kg)	Jr	Milwaukee, Wisconsin
F	**2	Torre Johnson (I)	6 ft 6 in (1.98 m)	215 lb (98 kg)	Sr	Milwaukee, Wisconsin

Head coach

- Rob Jeter (UW–Platteville)

Assistant coach(es)

- Chad Boudreau (Hannibal–LaGrange)
- Duffy Conroy (St. Ambrose)

Legend

- (C) Team captain
- (S) Suspended
- (I) Ineligible
- (W) Walk-on
- Injured
- Current redshirt

Roster
Last update: September 13, 2022

== Schedule and results ==
Date time, TV	Rank^{#}	Opponent^{#}	Result	Record	Site (attendance) city, state
Exhibition games
Nov 1, 2006*; 7:00 pm		Parkside	L 71-77		U.S. Cellular Arena; Milwaukee, WI
Nov 6, 2006*; 7:00 pm		Edgewood	W 77-53		U.S. Cellular Arena; Milwaukee, WI
John Thompson Foundation Classic
Nov 10, 2006*; 7:30 pm		Radford	W 72-60	1-0	U.S. Cellular Arena (3,154); Milwaukee, WI
Nov 11, 2006*; 7:30 pm		Washington State	L 54-74	1-1	U.S. Cellular Arena (3,736); Milwaukee, WI
Nov 12, 2006*; 5:30 pm		Alabama-Birmingham	L 60-75	1-2	U.S. Cellular Arena (2,765); Milwaukee, WI
Regular season
Nov 15, 2006*; 6:00 pm		at Michigan	L 59-66	1-3	Crisler Center (8,102); Ann Arbor, MI
Nov 19, 2006*; 4:05 pm		at Northern Iowa	L 58-69	1-4	McLeod Center (6,108); Cedar Falls, IA
Nov 22, 2006*; 7:00 pm		South Dakota State	W 75-58	2-4	U.S. Cellular Arena (2,685); Milwaukee, WI
Nov 26, 2006*; 7:00 pm		Tennessee Tech	L 68-78	2-5	U.S. Cellular Arena (2,636); Milwaukee, WI
Nov 29, 2006*; 6:00 pm		at Central Michigan	L 61-76	2-6	McGuirk Arena (1,684); Mount Pleasant, MI
Dec 2, 2006*; 3:00 pm		at Oakland	L 70-76	2-7	Athletics Center O'rena; Auburn Hills, MI
Dec 6, 2006*; 7:05 pm		at Missouri State	L 60-79	2-8	Hammons Student Center (6,257); Springfield MO
Dec 10, 2006; 12:00 pm		Youngstown State	L 65-68	2-9 (0-1)	U.S. Cellular Arena (2,670); Milwaukee, WI
Dec 13, 2006*; 7:00 pm		at No. 7 Wisconsin	L 49-68	2-10	Kohl Center (17,190); Madison, WI
Dec 22, 2006*; 7:00 pm		at Sam Houston State	L 73-89	2-11	Johnson Coliseum (1,089); Huntsville, TX
Dec 27, 2006*; 7:00 pm		Wyoming	W 75-73	3-11	U.S. Cellular Arena (3,224); Milwaukee, WI
Dec 30, 2006; 7:00 pm		No. 15 Butler	L 50-55	3-12 (0-2)	U.S. Cellular Arena (4,194); Milwaukee, WI
Jan 4, 2007; 7:00 pm		Detroit Mercy	W 65-64 ^{OT}	4-12 (1-2)	U.S. Cellular Arena (3,120); Milwaukee, WI
Jan 6, 2007; 3:00 pm		at Loyola-Chicago	L 74-87	4-13 (1-3)	Joseph J. Gentile Arena (2,918); Chicago, IL
Jan 11, 2007; 6:30 pm		at Cleveland State	W 60-48	5-13 (2-3)	Wolstein Center (1,842); Cleveland, OH
Jan 13, 2007; 6:35 pm		at Youngstown State	L 63-81	5-14 (2-4)	Beeghly Center (3,982); Youngstown, OH
Jan 17, 2007; 7:00 pm		Illinois-Chicago	W 76-65	6-14 (3-4)	U.S. Cellular Arena (3,312); Milwaukee, WI
Jan 21, 2007; 1:00 pm		Wright State	W 73-69	7-14 (4-4)	U.S. Cellular Arena (2,803); Milwaukee, WI
Jan 25, 2007; 6:05 pm		at Detroit Mercy	L 84-91 ^{OT}	7-15 (4-5)	Calihan Hall (1,453); Detroit, MI
Jan 27, 2007; 1:00 pm		Green Bay	L 67-73	7-16 (4-6)	U.S. Cellular Arena (6,190); Milwaukee, WI
Jan 29, 2007; 7:00 pm		Cleveland State	W 57-56 ^{OT}	8-16 (5-6)	U.s. Cellular Arena (3,203); Milwaukee, WI
Feb 3, 2007; 1:00 pm		at No. 13 Butler	L 47-66	8-17 (5-7)	Hinkle Fieldhouse (9,086); Indianapolis, IN
Feb 5, 2007; 6:00 pm		Wright State	L 50-76	8-18 (5-8)	Nutter Center (4,242); Dayton, OH
Feb 14, 2007; 7:00 pm		Loyola-Chicago	L 56-66	8-19 (5-9)	U.S. Cellular Arena (3,475); Milwaukee, WI
Feb 17, 2007*; 7:05 pm		at Drake	L 76-84	8-20	Knapp Center (5,424); Des Moines, IA
Feb 21, 2007; 7:00 pm		at Illinois-Chicago	L 59-72	8-21 (5-10)	Credit Union 1 Arena (3,912); Chicago, IL
Feb 24, 2007; 7:05 pm		at Green Bay	W 74-73	9-21 (6-10)	Resch Center (5,612); Ashwaubenon, WI
Horizon League tournament
Feb 27, 2007; 7:00 pm	(8)	(5) Illinois-Chicago; First round	L 77-83	9-22	Credit Union 1 Arena (1,098); Chicago, IL
*Non-conference game. ^{#}Rankings from AP Poll. (#) Tournament seedings in parentheses. All times are in Central Time.
