= List of NCAA Division I men's basketball career steals leaders =

In basketball, a steal is the act of legally gaining possession of the ball by a defensive player who causes the opponent to turn the ball over. The top 25 highest steals totals in National Collegiate Athletic Association (NCAA) Division I men's basketball history are listed below. The NCAA did not split into its current divisions format until August 1973. From 1906 to 1955, there were no classifications to the NCAA nor its predecessor, the Intercollegiate Athletic Association of the United States (IAAUS). Then, from 1956 to spring 1973, colleges were classified as either "NCAA University Division (Major College)" or "NCAA College Division (Small College)". Steals are a relatively new statistic in college basketball, having only become an official statistic beginning with the 1985–86 season. Therefore, Robert Morris's Chipper Harris, who amassed 450 steals during his career between 1980 and 1984, is not officially recognized in the all-time ranks.

The all-time Division I steals leader is Jacob Gilyard of Richmond. He recorded 466 steals by utilizing an extra year of eligibility granted by the NCAA due to the COVID-19 pandemic.

== Key ==
Pos.	G	F	C	Ref.
Position	Guard	Forward	Center	References

^	Player still competing in NCAA Division I
*	Elected to the Naismith Memorial Basketball Hall of Fame
Team (X)	Denotes the number of times a player from that team is represented on this list
C	Player was active in the 2020–21 season, benefiting from the NCAA's blanket COVID-19 eligibility waiver

== Top 25 career steals leaders ==
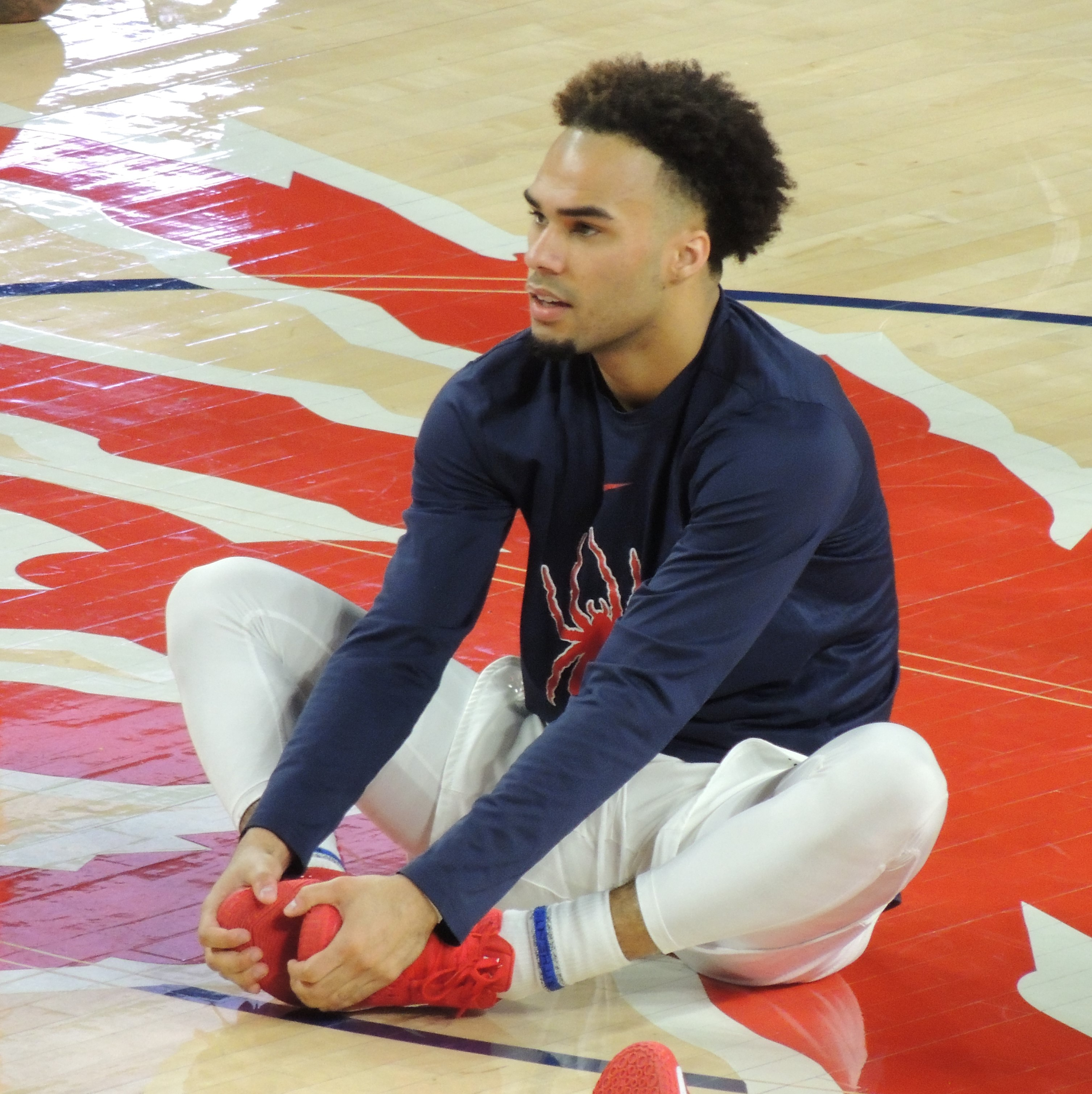
Jacob Gilyard, Richmond (2017–2022)

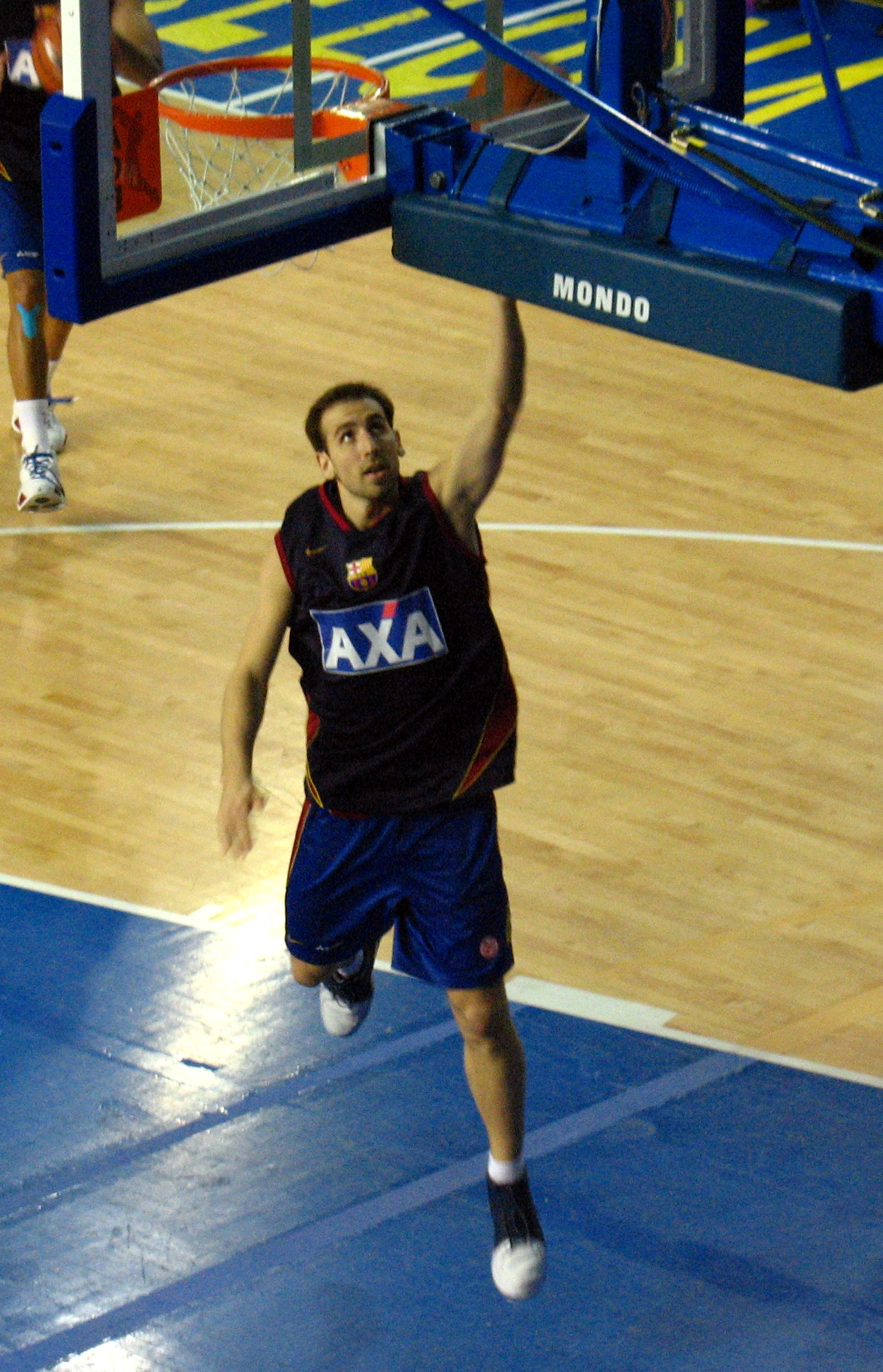
Juan "Pepe" Sánchez, Temple (1996–2000)

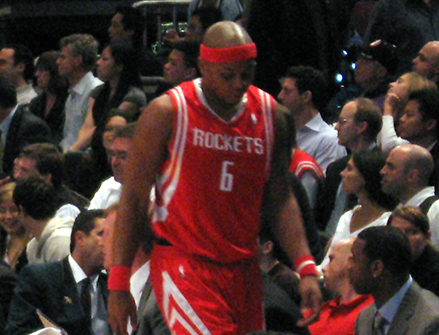
Bonzi Wells, Ball State (1994–1998)

Player	Pos.	Team	Career start	Career end	Games played	Steals	Ref.
Jacob Gilyard^{C}	G	Richmond	2017	2022	154	466	
John Linehan	G	Providence	1997	2002	122	385	
Eric Murdock	G	Providence (2)	1987	1991	117	376	
Brianté Weber	G	VCU	2011	2015	127	374	
Pepe Sánchez	G	Temple	1996	2000	116	365	
Cookie Belcher	G	Nebraska	1996	2001	131	353	
Kevin Braswell	G	Georgetown	1998	2002	128	349	
Bonzi Wells	G	Ball State	1994	1998	116	347	
Obie Trotter	G	Alabama A&M	2002	2006	114	346	
Laquincy Rideau	G	Gardner–Webb / South Florida	2015	2020	132	345	
Johnny Rhodes	G	Maryland	1992	1996	122	344	
Gerald Walker	G	San Francisco	1992	1996	111	344	
Ace Baldwin Jr.^{C}	G	VCU (2) / Penn State	2020	2025	143	342	
Devan Downey	G	Cincinnati / South Carolina	2005	2010	128	342	
Michael Anderson	G	Drexel	1984	1988	115	341	
Kenny Robertson	G	Cleveland State	1986	1990	119	341	
Aaron Craft	G	Ohio State	2010	2014	148	337	
Keith Jennings	G	East Tennessee State	1987	1991	127	334	
Juan Dixon	G	Maryland (2)	1998	2002	141	333	
Matisse Thybulle	G	Washington	2015	2019	135	331	
Desmond Cambridge	G	Alabama A&M (2)	1999	2002	84	330	
Jevon Carter	G	West Virginia	2014	2018	144	330	
Greg Anthony	G	Portland / UNLV	1987	1991	138	329	
Jason Hart	G	Syracuse	1996	2000	132	329	
Quan Jackson^{C}	G	Georgia Southern / UAB	2017	2022	157	329	
