= 2006–07 Wright State Raiders men's basketball team =

American college basketball season

2006–07 Wright State Raiders men's basketball

Horizon League Regular Season and Tournament champion

NCAA tournament, Round of 64
- Conference: Horizon League
- Record: 23–10 (13–3 Horizon)
- Head coach: Brad Brownell (1st season)
- Assistant coaches: Billy Donlon; Marty McGillan; Adrian Townsend
- Home arena: Nutter Center

2006–07 Horizon League men's basketball standings
	Conf.				Overall
Team	W		L	PCT	W		L	PCT
No. 21 Butler	13	–	3	.813	29	–	7	.806
Wright State †	13	–	3	.813	23	–	10	.697
Loyola (IL)	10	–	6	.625	21	–	11	.656
Green Bay	7	–	9	.438	18	–	15	.545
Youngstown State	7	–	9	.438	14	–	17	.452
UIC	7	–	9	.438	14	–	18	.438
Detroit	6	–	10	.375	11	–	19	.367
Milwaukee	6	–	10	.375	9	–	22	.290
Cleveland State	3	–	13	.188	10	–	21	.323
† 2007 Horizon League Tournament winner As of August 1, 2010; Rankings from AP Poll

The 2006–07 Wright State Raiders men's basketball team represented Wright State University in the 2006–07 NCAA Division I men's basketball season. The Raiders, led by head coach Brad Brownell, played their home games at the Nutter Center in Dayton, Ohio, as members of the Horizon League. The Raiders won a share of the Horizon League regular season title, and the right to host the 2007 Horizon League tournament. The Raiders won the tournament to earn an automatic bid to the NCAA tournament as the 14th seed in the West region. Wright State was beaten by 3rd seed Pittsburgh in the first round, 79–58.

== Roster ==
2006–07 Wright State Raiders men's basketball team
Players
Coaches

Pos.	#	Name	Height	Weight	Year	Hometown
F	2	Scottie Wilson	6 ft 6 in (1.98 m)	—	Jr	Middletown, Ohio
F	4	Drew Burleson	6 ft 6 in (1.98 m)	—	Sr	Wheelersburg, Ohio
G	5	DaShaun Wood	5 ft 11 in (1.8 m)	—	Sr	Detroit, Michigan
G	11	Eric Stevenson	5 ft 11 in (1.8 m)	—	Fr	Warrenton, North Carolina
G	21	Todd Brown	6 ft 5 in (1.96 m)	—	Fr	Canton, Ohio
G	22	Tyrone Scott	6 ft 3 in (1.91 m)	—	Sr	Detroit, Michigan
G	24	Reinaldo Smith	6 ft 2 in (1.88 m)	—	Sr	Fairborn, Ohio
G	34	Will Graham	6 ft 2 in (1.88 m)	—	So	Lexington, Kentucky
F	40	Ronnie Thomas	6 ft 8 in (2.03 m)	—	So	Middlebury, Indiana
G	44	Vaughn Duggins	6 ft 3 in (1.91 m)	—	Fr	Pendleton, Indiana
F	50	Jordan Pleiman	6 ft 8 in (2.03 m)	—	Jr	Fort Loramie, Ohio

Head coach

- Brad Brownell (DePauw)

Assistant coach(es)

- Billy Donlon (UNC Wilmington)
- Marty McGillan (UNC Wilmington)
- Adrian Townsend (California (PA))

Legend

- (C) Team captain
- (S) Suspended
- (I) Ineligible
- (W) Walk-on
- Injured
- Current redshirt

Roster
Last update: April 30, 2022

== Schedule and results ==
Date time, TV	Rank^{#}	Opponent^{#}	Result	Record	Site city, state
Exhibition
November 2, 2006*; 7:00 pm		Indianapolis	W 94–63		Nutter Center (3,466); Fairborn, OH
Regular season
November 11, 2006*; 7:30 pm		at Miami (OH)	W 57–56	1–0	Millett Hall (4,413); Oxford, OH
November 19, 2006*; 2:00 pm		at Coastal Carolina	L 63–70 ^{2OT}	1–1	Kimbel Arena (914); Conway, SC
November 22, 2006*; 8:00 pm		at Chicago State	L 70–86	1–2	Dickens Athletic Center (342); Chicago, IL
December 2, 2006; 3:00 pm		Detroit	W 50–49	2–2 (1–0)	Nutter Center (5,192); Fairborn, OH
December 5, 2006*; 8:00 pm		at Bradley	L 49–88	2–3	Carver Arena (8,388); Peoria, IL
December 9, 2006*; 7:00 pm		at St. Bonaventure	W 59–57	3–3	Reilly Center (3,277); St. Bonaventure, NY
December 13, 2006*; 7:00 pm		at Marshall	L 72–79	3–4	Cam Henderson Center (3,082); Huntington, WV
December 16, 2006*; 5:00 pm		Bowling Green	L 56–59	3–5	Nutter Center (4,013); Fairborn, OH
December 19, 2006*; 7:00 pm		Marist	W 63–53	4–5	Nutter Center (3,032); Fairborn, OH
December 21, 2006*; 7:00 pm		Chicago State	W 63–62	5–5	Nutter Center (3,215); Fairborn, OH
December 27, 2006*; 8:30 pm		at LSU; Hispanic College Fund Classic	L 45–71	5–6	Pete Maravich Assembly Center (8,755); Baton Rouge, LA
December 28, 2006*; 6:00 pm		vs. Samford; Hispanic College Fund Classic	W 61–50	6–6	Pete Maravich Assembly Center (8,522); Baton Rouge, LA
December 29, 2006*; 6:00 pm		at Mississippi Valley State; Hispanic College Fund Classic	W 55–54	7–6	Pete Maravich Assembly Center (8,983); Baton Rouge, LA
January 2, 2007*; 7:00 pm		IPFW	W 72–58	8–6	Nutter Center (3,364); Fairborn, OH
January 4, 2007; 7:00 pm		UIC	W 76–62	9–6 (2–0)	Nutter Center (3,831); Fairborn, OH
January 6, 2007; 2:00 pm		at No. 13 Butler	L 42–73	9–7 (2–1)	Hinkle Fieldhouse (5,902); Indianapolis, IN
January 10, 2007; 7:00 pm		Loyola Chicago	W 81–55	10–7 (3–1)	Nutter Center (4,911); Fairborn, OH
January 13, 2007; 7:00 pm		Green Bay	W 78–67	11–7 (4–1)	Nutter Center (6,792); Fairborn, OH
January 18, 2007; 7:00 pm		at Cleveland State	W 78–67	12–7 (5–1)	Wolstein Center (2,087); Cleveland, OH
January 21, 2007; 2:00 pm		at Milwaukee	L 69–73	12–8 (5–2)	U.S. Cellular Arena (2,803); Milwaukee, WI
January 24, 2007; 7:00 pm		Youngstown State	W 62–49	13–8 (6–2)	Nutter Center (4,334); Fairborn, OH
January 27, 2007; 5:00 pm		at Loyola	W 59–47	14–8 (7–2)	Joseph J. Gentile Center (2,524); Chicago, IL
January 29, 2007; 8:00 pm		at Green Bay	W 65–54	15–8 (8–2)	Resch Center (3,517); Green Bay, WI
February 3, 2007; 4:00 pm		at Detroit	W 66–59	16–8 (9–2)	Calihan Hall (2,945); Detroit, MI
February 5, 2007; 7:00 pm		Milwaukee	W 76–50	17–8 (10–2)	Nutter Center (4,242); Fairborn, OH
February 7, 2007; 8:00 pm		at UIC	W 74–64 ^{OT}	18–8 (11–2)	UIC Pavilion (3,422); Chicago, IL
February 10, 2007; 7:00 pm		No. 10 Butler	W 77–65	19–8 (12–2)	Nutter Center (10,827); Fairborn, OH
February 14, 2007; 7:00 pm		Cleveland State	W 68–55	20–8 (13–2)	Nutter Center (4,781); Fairborn, OH
February 17, 2007*; 8:00 pm		Cal State Fullerton; ESPN BracketBusters	W 77–62	21–8	Nutter Center (9,614); Fairborn, OH
February 22, 2007; 7:00 pm		at Youngstown State	L 57–72	21–9 (13–3)	Beeghly Center (2,952); Youngstown, OH
Horizon League tournament
March 3, 2007; 7:00 pm	(1)	(4) Green Bay; Horizon League Semifinals	W 67–51	22–9	Nutter Center (9,128); Fairborn, OH
March 6, 2007; 9:00 pm	(1)	(2) No. 19 Butler; Horizon League Championship	W 60–55	23–9	Nutter Center (10,686); Fairborn, OH
NCAA tournament
March 15, 2007; 9:40 pm	(14 W)	vs. (3 W) No. 12 Pittsburgh; NCAA First Round	L 58–79	23–10	HSBC Arena (18,843); Buffalo, NY
*Non-conference game. ^{#}Rankings from AP Poll. (#) Tournament seedings in parentheses.

== Awards and honors ==
DaShaun Wood	MVP
Drew Burleson	Raider Award
DaShaun Woods	First Team All Horizon League
Todd Brown	Horizon League All Newcomer Team
Vaughn Duggins	Horizon League All Newcomer Team
DaShaun Wood	Horizon League All Defensive Team

== Statistics ==
Number	Name	Games	Average	Points	Assists	Rebounds
00	DaShaun Wood	33	19.6	648	131	167
44	Vaughn Duggins	33	9.0	296	82	108
21	Todd Brown	33	8.6	285	38	95
4	Drew Burleson	33	8.6	283	27	191
50	Jordan Pleiman	33	7.3	241	10	178
2	Scottie Wilson	29	5.2	151	7	103
34	William Graham	32	3.5	112	71	66
24	Reinaldo Smith	32	1.6	52	23	34
22	Tyrone Scott	29	1.8	52	11	21
11	Eric Stevenson	15	0.3	5	2	3
