= Tom Dimitroff Sr. =

American gridiron football player and coach (1935–1996)

Tom Dimitroff
No. 86, 15
- Position: Quarterback

Personal information
- Born: June 6, 1935; Akron, Ohio, U.S.
- Died: January 20, 1996 (aged 60); Strongsville, Ohio, U.S.
- Listed height: 5 ft 11 in (1.80 m)
- Listed weight: 200 lb (91 kg)

Career information
- High school: Barberton (Barberton, Ohio)
- College: Miami (OH)
- NFL draft: 1957: 25th round, 294th overall pick

Career history

Playing
- Ottawa Rough Riders (1957-1958); Boston Patriots (1960)

Coaching
- Miami (OH) (1969-1972) Assistant; Kansas State (1973) Assistant; Ottawa Rough Riders (1974–1977) Quarterback / offensive coordinator; Hamilton Tiger-Cats (1978) Head coach; Guelph (1979-1983) Head coach; Ottawa Rough Riders (1986) Head coach

Operations
- Ottawa Rough Riders (1984-1986) Director of player personnel; Cleveland Browns (1987–1995) Scout

Awards and highlights
- Grey Cup champion (1976)
- Stats at Pro Football Reference

Thomas George Dimitroff Sr. (June 6, 1935 – January 20, 1996) was an American gridiron football player and coach.

== Playing career ==
Dimitroff was a two-time All-Mid-American Conference quarterback and defensive back at Miami University in Oxford, Ohio. He passed for 1,096 yards and 11 touchdowns, and ran for 542 yards. As a kicker, he converted on 22 extra-point attempts and had a punting average of 36.2 yards. He played on two MAC championship football teams under Ara Parseghian and John Pont. He was selected by the Cleveland Browns in the 25th round of the 1957 NFL draft. He instead signed with the Ottawa Rough Riders Interprovincial Rugby Football Union. On August 23, 1958, Dimitroff started for Ottawa in the first regular-season game in Canadian Football League history. In May 1959, Dimitroff was traded along with Larry Hayes, Jim Marshall, Frank Fraser, and Karl Hilzinger to the Saskatchewan Roughriders for quarterback Frank Tripucka. Dimitroff retired shortly after the trade, never playing a game for Saskatchewan.

In 1960, Dimitroff came out of retirement to play for the newly formed American Football League (AFL). He signed with the New York Titans, but did not appear in any games for them. He later signed with the Boston Patriots and appeared in three games, throwing two incomplete passes.

== Coaching career ==
After serving as an assistant coach at Barberton High School and Wadsworth High School, Dimitroff returned to Miami, where he was an assistant from 1969 to 1972. After one season at Kansas State, Dimitroff joined former Rough Rider teammate George Brancato in Ottawa. From 1974 to 1977, he served as the Ottawa Rough Riders quarterbacks coach and offensive coordinator, helping coach Ottawa to victory in the 1976 Grey Cup, the final Grey Cup victory in Rough Riders history.

In 1978, he became the head coach of the Hamilton Tiger-Cats. He was fired after five games and replaced by John Payne. Following his departure from Hamilton, Dimitroff coached the Guelph Gryphons football team, where his son Randy was quarterback from 1982 to 1985.

Dimitroff left coaching in 1984 to serve as Director of Player Personnel for the Ottawa Rough Riders. In 1986, he was named the team's interim head coach after the firing of Joe Moss. The Rough Riders were 0–4–1 under Dimitroff and in 1987 he joined the Cleveland Browns as a college scout.

== Family and death ==
He was the father of former Atlanta Falcons general manager Thomas Dimitroff. Dimitroff died on January 20, 1996, in Strongsville, Ohio.

== See also ==
- List of American Football League players
