= George Izo =

American football player (1937–2022)

No. 3, 15
- Position: Quarterback

Personal information
- Born: September 20, 1937; Barberton, Ohio, U.S.
- Died: June 10, 2022 (aged 84); Alexandria, Virginia, U.S.
- Listed height: 6 ft 4 in (1.93 m)
- Listed weight: 218 lb (99 kg)

Career information
- High school: Barberton (OH)
- College: Notre Dame
- NFL draft: 1960: 1st round, 2nd overall pick
- AFL draft: 1960: 1st round

Career history
- St. Louis Cardinals (1960); Washington Redskins (1961–1964); Detroit Lions (1965); Pittsburgh Steelers (1966)

Awards and highlights
- NFL record: Longest touchdown pass: 99 yards (tied)

Career NFL statistics
- Passing attempts: 317
- Passing completions: 132
- Completion percentage: 41.6%
- TD–INT: 12–32
- Passing yards: 1,791
- Passer rating: 33.4
- Stats at Pro Football Reference

George William Izo (September 20, 1937 – June 10, 2022) was an American professional football player who was a quarterback for seven seasons in the National Football League (NFL). He played for the St. Louis Cardinals, Washington Redskins, Detroit Lions, and the Pittsburgh Steelers from 1960 to 1966, having earlier played college football at the University of Notre Dame.

== Early life ==
Izo was born in Barberton, Ohio, on September 20, 1937. He attended Barberton High School, where he starred in basketball and baseball in addition to being an all-state quarterback.

== College career ==
Izo attended and played college football at the University of Notre Dame. His father, George Izo Sr., also played at Notre Dame under coach Knute Rockne. During his college career, he threw for 2,095 yards and 18 touchdowns, and led the Irish to a 20–19 upset of the University of Iowa in his next to last game.

Izo earned his varsity letter during his sophomore year, but during the off-season he sprained his ankle during initiation into the Monogram Club. He missed spring practice and did not return to the field until mid-season of his junior year. The off-season before Izo's senior year, coach Joe Kuharich decided to install a T formation offense. The week before the first game of his senior season, he appeared on the cover of Sports Illustrated. However, the Tuesday before the game he hurt his knee in practice and missed the first two games of that season (an early example of the Sports Illustrated cover jinx urban legend). Still, that year he was named to the Coaches All-American Team, started in the Chicago College All-Star Game against the Baltimore Colts, and played in the East–West Shrine Game.

Izo graduated with a degree in Business Administration.

== Professional career ==
Izo played in a total of 26 games and completed 132 passes in 317 attempts for 1,791 yards, 12 touchdowns and 32 interceptions.

=== NFL & AFL drafts ===
Izo was drafted in the first round (second overall) of the 1960 NFL draft by the Chicago Cardinals. He was also chosen in the 1960 American Football League draft as a "territorial selection" by the Titans of New York (now New York Jets). To begin the draft, each of the eight AFL teams received one territorial/bonus selection to help ensure every team had a regional draw to help the financial success of each franchise. These regional picks did not occur in any order. Instead, they were unanimously agreed upon by the other teams.

=== St. Louis Cardinals ===
Izo chose the Cardinals over the AFL, and signed his $15,000 contract at Soldier Field in Chicago during a game against the Chicago Bears. The franchise moved to St. Louis, Missouri one month after Izo signed his contract. In 1960, he won the starting job for the Cardinals by the third game of the season. But, he re-injured the same knee that he hurt in college and underwent surgery. Izo was traded at the end of training camp in 1961.

=== Washington Redskins ===
On September 12, 1961, Izo was traded to the Washington Redskins for quarterback Ralph Guglielmi. The Redskins wanted him as a backup to Norm Snead, the Wake Forest quarterback the Redskins drafted second overall in the 1961 NFL draft. On September 15, 1963, stepping in for Snead, he threw a 99-yard touchdown pass to Bobby Mitchell, which tied a franchise and league record. Coincidentally, the first two occurrences of a 99-yard pass play featured Redskins' quarterbacks. In 1964, the Redskins traded Snead to the Philadelphia Eagles for quarterback Sonny Jurgensen and after backing him up for one year, Izo asked to be traded.

=== Detroit Lions ===
In 1965, the Detroit Lions traded guard Darrell Dess to the Redskins for Izo and guard Ted Karras. During his only year in Detroit, Izo backed up Milt Plum and the Lions won six games. He was released by the Lions on September 5, 1966.

=== Pittsburgh Steelers ===
After his release from the Lions, Izo worked out for and was signed to the Pittsburgh Steelers' roster on September 24, 1966. He played in four games during his time in Pittsburgh and was released on November 2, 1966. A year later, he turned down an offer by the Redskins to return to Washington to backup Sonny Jurgensen.

== Personal life ==
After retiring from football in 1967, Izo moved to the Bahamas and participated in a business venture that built condominiums. While living there, he coached high school football at Freeport Anglican High School. He moved back to Washington, D.C. three years later and became a partner in a wholesale food company; he worked in the food industry regularly.

Izo's first marriage was to Anita Rowland. Together, they had two children: Erik Izo and Amy Mann Fang. They eventually divorced. He then married Deborah Spivey, with whom he had one daughter (Lillianna Victoria Izo). He died on June 10, 2022, at a retirement home in Alexandria, Virginia. He was 84, and suffered from Alzheimer's disease prior to his death.

=== Military tours ===
Starting in the late 1990s after moving to California, Izo took former NFL stars to military bases in South Korea, Japan and Guam in his role as business development manager for California Sunshine milk, which had a contract with the U.S. government. He has made tours with Billy Kilmer, Ken Stabler, Paul Hornung and Earl Morrall, among others.
