= 2006–07 Cleveland State Vikings men's basketball team =

American college basketball season

2006–07 Cleveland State Vikings men's basketball
- Conference: Horizon League
- Record: 10–21 (3–13 Horizon League)
- Head coach: Gary Waters
- Assistant coaches: Jayson Gee; Larry DeSimpelare; Jermaine Kimbrough
- Home arena: Wolstein Center

2006–07 Horizon League men's basketball standings
| | Conf. | | | | Overall |
| Team | W | | L | PCT | W | | L | PCT |
|---|---|---|---|---|---|---|---|---|
| No. 21 Butler | 13 | – | 3 | .813 | 29 | – | 7 | .806 |
| Wright State † | 13 | – | 3 | .813 | 23 | – | 10 | .697 |
| Loyola (IL) | 10 | – | 6 | .625 | 21 | – | 11 | .656 |
| Green Bay | 7 | – | 9 | .438 | 18 | – | 15 | .545 |
| Youngstown State | 7 | – | 9 | .438 | 14 | – | 17 | .452 |
| UIC | 7 | – | 9 | .438 | 14 | – | 18 | .438 |
| Detroit | 6 | – | 10 | .375 | 11 | – | 19 | .367 |
| Milwaukee | 6 | – | 10 | .375 | 9 | – | 22 | .290 |
| Cleveland State | 3 | – | 13 | .188 | 10 | – | 21 | .323 |
† 2007 Horizon League Tournament winner As of August 1, 2010; Rankings from AP Poll

The 2006–07 Cleveland State Vikings men's basketball team represented Cleveland State University in the 2006–07 college basketball season. The team was led by first-year head coach Gary Waters. In 2005–06, the Vikings finished 10–18 (6–10 in the Horizon League). Cleveland State's last winning season was the 2000–2001 season when they finished 19–13 overall and 9–5 in conference play. Their last NCAA tournament appearance was their run to the Sweet Sixteen in 1986. The highlight of the season was arguably when the Vikings went on a four-game winning streak defeating Miami (FL), John Carroll, Delaware, and Kent State. It was the 76th season of Cleveland State basketball.

== Preseason ==
The preseason Horizon League Coaches' Poll picked the Vikings to finish ninth. J'Nathan Bullock was named to the preseason all-Horizon League 2nd team.

== Notable players ==
- Carlos English

== Schedule ==
Horizon League Standing: 9th
| **Date** | **Opponent*** | **Rank*** | **Location** | **Time^{#}** | Result | **Overall** | **Conference** |
**Exhibition Game**
| November 7, 2006 | Slippery Rock | | Cleveland, OH | 7:00 p.m. | W 72–51 | 1–0 | 0–0 |
**Regular Season Games**
| November 11, 2006 | George Mason | | Cleveland, OH | 3:00 p.m. | L 79–74 | 0–1 | 0–0 |
| November 13, 2006 | Notre Dame College | | Cleveland, OH | 7:00 p.m. | W 88–62 | 1–1 | 0–0 |
| November 17, 2006 | Buffalo | | Evansville, IN | 9:30 p.m. | L 77–73 | 1–2 | 0–0 |
| November 18, 2006 | Evansville | | Evansville, IN | 6:00 p.m. | L 63–49 | 1–3 | 0–0 |
| November 19, 2006 | Miami | | Evansville, IN | 2:00 p.m. | W 78–67 | 2–3 | 0–0 |
| November 22, 2006 | John Carroll | | Cleveland, OH | 7:00 p.m. | W 84–65 | 3–3 | 0–0 |
| November 26, 2006 | Delaware | | Newark, DE | 1:00 p.m. | W 59–53 | 4–3 | 0–0 |
| November 29, 2006 | Kent State | | Cleveland, OH | 7:00 p.m. | W 66–59 | 5–3 | 0–0 |
| December 2, 2006 | **Butler** | | Indianapolis, IN | 8:00 p.m. | L 70–45 | 5–4 | 0–1 |
| December 5, 2006 | Kansas State | | Manhattan, KS | 8:00 p.m. | L 93–60 | 5–5 | 0–1 |
| December 9, 2006 | Ohio State | | Columbus, OH | 4:00 p.m. | L 78–57 | 5–6 | 0–1 |
| December 17, 2006 | Central Michigan | | Mt. Pleasant, MI | 2:00 p.m. | L 78–76 | 5–7 | 0–1 |
| December 19, 2006 | Chicago State | | Cleveland, OH | 2:00 p.m. | L 82–77 | 5–8 | 0–1 |
| December 27, 2006 | **Illinois Chicago** | | Cleveland, OH | 7:00 p.m. | L 72–62 | 5–9 | 0–2 |
| December 30, 2006 | West Virginia Tech | | Cleveland, OH | 5:30 p.m. | W 73–52 | 6–9 | 0–2 |
| January 4, 2007 | **Loyola Chicago** | | Chicago, IL | 8:00 p.m. | L 66–55 | 6–10 | 0–3 |
| January 6, 2007 | **UW–Green Bay** | | Green Bay, WI | 8:05 p.m. | L 65–53 | 6–11 | 0–4 |
| January 11, 2007 | **UW–Milwaukee** | | Cleveland, OH | 8:05 p.m. | L 60–48 | 6–12 | 0–5 |
| January 13, 2007 | **Detroit Mercy** | | Cleveland, OH | 5:30 p.m. | W 63–61 | 7–12 | 1–5 |
| January 18, 2007 | **Wright State** | | Cleveland, OH | 7:00 p.m. | L 78–65 | 7–13 | 1–6 |
| January 20, 2007 | **Youngstown State** | | Youngstown, OH | 7:05 p.m. | L 78–65 | 7–14 | 1–7 |
| January 27, 2007 | **Illinois Chicago** | | Chicago, IL | 3:00 p.m. | W 60–55 | 8–14 | 2–7 |
| January 29, 2007 | **UW–Milwaukee** | | Milwaukee, WI | 8:00 p.m. | L 57–56 | 8–15 | 2–8 |
| February 1, 2007 | **Loyola Chicago** | | Cleveland, OH | 7:30 p.m. | L 61–57 | 8–16 | 2–9 |
| February 3, 2007 | **UW–Green Bay** | | Cleveland, OH | 5:30 p.m. | L 79–66 | 8–17 | 2–10 |
| February 8, 2007 | **Butler** | | Cleveland, OH | 7:00 p.m. | L 92–50 | 8–18 | 2–11 |
| February 14, 2007 | **Wright State** | | Fairborn, OH | 7:00 p.m. | L 68–55 | 8–19 | 2–12 |
| February 17, 2007 | California State Northridge | | Northridge, CA | 7:00 p.m. | W 85–76 | 9–19 | 2–12 |
| February 21, 2007 | **Detroit Mercy** | | Detroit, MI | 7:05 p.m. | L 60–48 | 9–20 | 2–13 |
| February 24, 2007 | **Youngstown State** | | Cleveland, OH | 5:30 p.m. | W 68–55 | 10–20 | 3–13 |
**Horizon League tournament**
| February 27, 2007 | **UW–Green Bay** | | Green Bay, WI | 8:00 p.m. | L 78–59 | 10–21 | 3–13 |
*Rank according to ESPN/USA Today Coaches Poll. ^{#}All times are in EST. Conference games in **BOLD**.
