= Pape Badiane =

French basketball player (1980–2016)

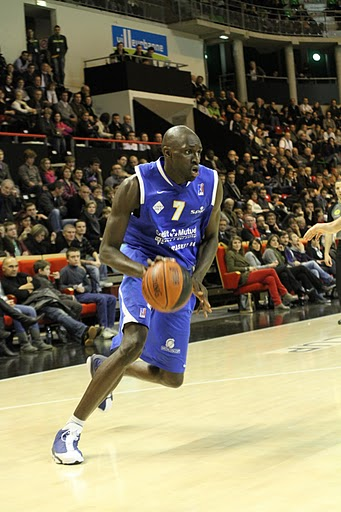

Personal information
- Born: 10 February 1980 Boulogne-Billancourt, France
- Died: 23 December 2016 (aged 36) Frontenay-Rohan-Rohan, France
- Listed height: 6 ft 10 in (2.08 m)

Career information
- College: Cleveland State (2000–2003)
- Playing career: 2003–2016
- Position: Power forward
- Number: 7

Career history
- 2003–2008: Chorale Roanne
- 2008–2009: Le Mans Sarthe
- 2009–2013: Poitiers Basket 86
- 2014–2016: USV St Clement

Career highlights
- LNB Pro A champion (2007); French Cup winner (2009); 2× Semaine des As winner (2007, 2009); 3× LNB All-Star (2006, 2007, 2009)

Pape Badiane (10 February 1980 – 23 December 2016) was a French professional basketball player who played 23 times for the men's French national basketball team between 2007 and 2008. He died on 23 December 2016 in a traffic accident.

After a career that included stops in the NCAA with Cleveland State (2000–2003), and a return to France where he played in Pro A with Roanne, Le Mans and Poitiers, he played in the third French division. He was a member of the French national team in Eurobasket 2007 and a member of Roanne in the Euroleague.

He won the French title with Roanne in 2007. He also won the French Cup in 2009, the Semaine des As in both 2007 and 2009, and was selected three times in the French All Star Game (2006, 2007, 2009).

His younger brother, Moussa Badiane, is also a professional basketball player.
