= Thomas Dimitroff =

American football executive (born 1966)

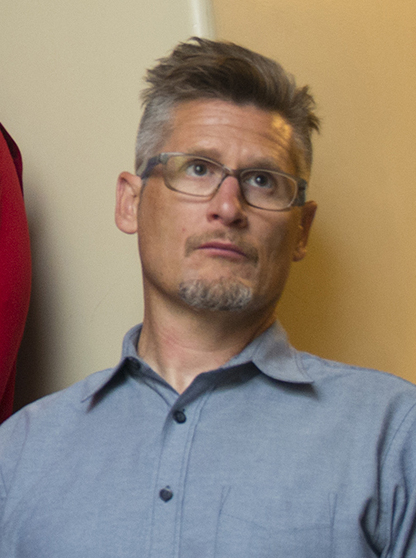
- Dimitroff in 2017

New Orleans Saints
- Title: Consultant

Personal information
- Born: July 14, 1966 (age 60); Barberton, Ohio, U.S.

Career information
- College: Guelph

Career history
- Saskatchewan Roughriders (1990–1991) Scout coordinator; World League of American Football (1992) NFL scout; Kansas City Chiefs (1993) Scout; Detroit Lions (1994–1997) Scout; Cleveland Browns (1998–2001) Scout; New England Patriots (2002) National scout; New England Patriots (2003–2007) Director of college scouting; Atlanta Falcons (2008–2020) General manager; New Orleans Saints (2025–present) Consultant

Awards and highlights
- 2× Super Bowl champion (XXXVIII, XXXIX)

Thomas George Dimitroff Jr. (born July 14, 1966) is an American football executive who is currently a consultant for the New Orleans Saints of the National Football League (NFL). He served as the general manager of the Atlanta Falcons from 2008 to 2020. Before joining the Falcons in 2008, Dimitroff was with the New England Patriots for six years. He joined the Patriots in 2002 as a national scout before being named director of college scouting a year later. He is the son of former football player and coach Tom Dimitroff Sr.

== Early life ==
Dimitroff was born in Ohio to Tom Dimitroff Sr. and Helen (née Kenhart). He grew up moving from state to state in the US, but eventually settled in Canada, where his father was a football coach with the Ottawa Rough Riders, Hamilton Tiger-Cats, and the University of Guelph in Ontario. In 1983, Dimitroff served as an equipment manager for the Guelph football team. From 1985–1990, he played defensive back for the Gryphons football team and was team captain from 1988–1990. Dimitroff graduated from Guelph with a Bachelor of Arts degree in 1990. His brother Randy played quarterback for Guelph from 1982–1985 as they were teammates in 1985. His nephew Dillon Dimitroff also played for Guelph from 2009–2012.

== Professional career ==
=== Early career ===
After graduating from college, Dimitroff joined the Saskatchewan Roughriders of the Canadian Football League as their Canadian scouting coordinator, but worked in many areas of the team's operations for the two seasons he was there. In 1992, he worked in the Dallas, Texas office of the World League of American Football, tracking NFL player transactions and rosters. When the league folded later that year, Dimitroff moved to Japan, where he helped coach a friend's corporate American football team.

Dimitroff then considered leaving the football world, but instead he went back to the United States, where he joined the Cleveland Browns' grounds crew; his father was a scout for the team at the time. There he worked under then-head coach Bill Belichick and then-pro personnel assistant Scott Pioli. At the same time, he worked as a part-time scout for the Kansas City Chiefs in 1993. In 1994, Dimitroff became a full-time area scout for the Detroit Lions, a position he held through 1997. He then held a similar college scouting position with the Browns from 1998 through 2001.

=== New England Patriots ===
In 2002, Dimitroff re-joined Belichick and Pioli with the New England Patriots as a national scout. He spent the season reporting on the nation's top prospects before being promoted to director of college scouting on June 11, 2003. He oversaw the team's college scouting operations through the 2007 season, with future general managers Bob Quinn, Jon Robinson, and Adam Peters working under him.

=== Atlanta Falcons ===
After six seasons with the Patriots, Dimitroff was hired as the Falcons' general manager on January 13, 2008.

In the 2008 NFL draft, Dimitroff and the Falcons drafted both quarterback Matt Ryan and offensive tackle Sam Baker in the first round. The Falcons also signed free agent running back Michael Turner from the San Diego Chargers, who was selected to the 2009 Pro Bowl in his first year with the team. The Falcons, under first-year head coach Mike Smith, reached the playoffs in 2008 for the first time in four seasons, but lost to the Arizona Cardinals in the opening round. Soon after, Sporting News named Dimitroff their 2008 NFL Executive of the Year.

The Falcons finished 9–7 in 2009, missing the playoffs. In 2010, the Falcons finished 13–3, earning home field advantage for the duration of the playoffs; however, they lost to the Green Bay Packers in the Divisional round. He was named the 2010 NFL Executive of the Year by the Sporting News, his second time receiving the award. The Falcons then made consecutive playoff appearances in 2011 and 2012 with records of 10–6 and 13–3 respectively. The Falcons reached the NFC Championship game in 2012 and were four points away from the Super Bowl. After five successful seasons, the Falcons took a turn for the worse and generated records of 4–12, 6–10, and 8–8 the next three years. In 2016, the Falcons finished the regular season 11–5, and they earned a trip to the Super Bowl where Dimitroff would face his mentor Bill Belichick. The Falcons lost in overtime by a score of 34–28.

On October 11, 2020, Dimitroff was fired from the Falcons along with head coach Dan Quinn following the team's 0–5 start to the season.

=== Post-executive career ===
In January 2022, Dimitroff began working alongside American billionaire hedge fund manager, Paul Tudor Jones, and his son, Jack Jones, to create a football analytics company named SumerSports and holds the position of President of Football Operations.

After being out of NFL for over four years, Dimitroff interviewed for the general manager vacancy with the New York Jets in December 2024. A month later, he interviewed with the Tennessee Titans for their general manager opening. Both teams ended up offering the open positions to other candidates with him losing out to Darren Mougey and Mike Borgonzi, respectively.

=== New Orleans Saints ===
On September 2, 2025, the New Orleans Saints hired Dimitroff as a consultant, reporting to general manager, Mickey Loomis.
