= Jumpin' Joe Williams =

American football player (1915–1997)

No. 2, 27, 40, 22, 29, 6, 1, 33
- Position: Back

Personal information
- Born: March 19, 1915; Barberton, Ohio, U.S.
- Died: May 5, 1997 (aged 82)
- Listed height: 5 ft 9 in (1.75 m)
- Listed weight: 178 lb (81 kg)

Career information
- High school: Barberton (Ohio)
- College: Ohio State
- NFL draft: 1937: undrafted

Career history
- Cleveland Rams (1937); Pittsburgh Pirates (1939); Columbus Bullies (1939–1940); Hollywood Bears (1941–1942, 1946); Los Angeles Bulldogs (1947)
- Stats at Pro Football Reference

Joseph John Williams (March 19, 1915 – May 5, 1997), known as Jumpin' Joe Williams, was an American professional football back who played two seasons in the National Football League (NFL) with the Cleveland Rams and Pittsburgh Pirates. He played college football at Ohio State University.

== Early life and college ==
Joseph John Williams was born on March 19, 1915, in Barberton, Ohio. He played high school football at Barberton High School in Barberton. He scored 60 touchdowns in high school, during which time he was given the nickname "Jumpin' Joe" after "Jumping Joe" Savoldi.

Williams was a two-year letterman for the Ohio State Buckeyes of Ohio State University from 1935 to 1936.

== Professional career ==
Williams went undrafted in the 1937 NFL draft. He played in one game for the NFL's Cleveland Rams during the team's inaugural 1937 season.

Williams appeared in one game for the Pittsburgh Pirates of the NFL in 1939.

He played in ten games, starting eight, for the Columbus Bullies of the American Professional Football Association during the 1939 season, scoring five passing touchdowns, one rushing touchdown, and one receiving touchdown. The Bullies moved to the American Football League in 1940. Williams appeared in nine games for Columbus during the 1940 season, recording three passing touchdowns and three rushing touchdowns.

Williams played for the Hollywood Bears of the Pacific Coast Professional Football League (PCPFL) from 1941 to 1942, and rushed for one touchdown in 1941. He then served in the United States Army Air Forces during World War II. He returned to the Bears after the war, and scored one rushing touchdown, one receiving touchdown, and one fumble recovery touchdown during the 1946 season.

Williams played for the Los Angeles Bulldogs of the PCPFL in 1947, totaling one start, one rushing touchdown, and one receiving touchdown.

== Personal life ==
Williams died on May 5, 1997.
