= 1986 AMCU-8 men's basketball tournament =

- Classification: Division I
- Season: 1985–86
- Teams: 8
- Site: John Q. Hammons Student Center; Springfield, Missouri
- Champions: Cleveland State (1st title)
- Winning coach: Kevin Mackey (1st title)
- MVP: Kevin Duckworth (Eastern Illinois)
- AMCU-8 men's basketball tournaments

1985–86 AMCU-8 Conference men's basketball standings
	Conf.				Overall
Team	W		L	PCT	W		L	PCT
Cleveland State †	13	–	1	.929	29	–	4	.879
Southwest Missouri State	10	–	4	.714	24	–	8	.750
Eastern Illinois	8	–	6	.571	19	–	13	.594
Western Illinois	7	–	7	.500	13	–	15	.464
Illinois–Chicago	7	–	7	.500	13	–	16	.448
Valparaiso	5	–	9	.357	9	–	19	.321
Wisconsin–Green Bay	3	–	11	.214	5	–	23	.179
Northern Iowa	3	–	11	.214	8	–	19	.296
† 1986 AMCU-8 tournament winner

The 1986 AMCU-8 men's basketball tournament was held March 6–8, 1986, at the John Q. Hammons Student Center at Southwest Missouri State University in Springfield, Missouri.

Cleveland State defeated Eastern Illinois in the title game, 70–66, to win their first AMCU/Summit League championship. The AMCU-8 did not receive an automatic bid to the 1986 Tournament. However, the Vikings earned an at-large bid and made a run to the Sweet Sixteen.

== Format ==
All eight conference members qualified for the tournament. First round seedings were based on regular season record.

== Bracket ==
Quarterfinals; Thursday, March 6
1	Cleveland State	73
8	Northern Iowa	68
4	Western Illinois	68
5	Illinois–Chicago	71
2	Southwest Missouri State	63
7	Wisconsin–Green Bay	50
3	Eastern Illinois	85
6	Valparaiso	65

Semifinals; Friday, March 7
1	Cleveland State	100
5	Illinois–Chicago	84
2	Southwest Missouri State	67
3	Eastern Illinois	71

Final; Saturday, March 8
1	Cleveland State	70
3	Eastern Illinois	66
