= John Cominsky =

American football player (born 1995)

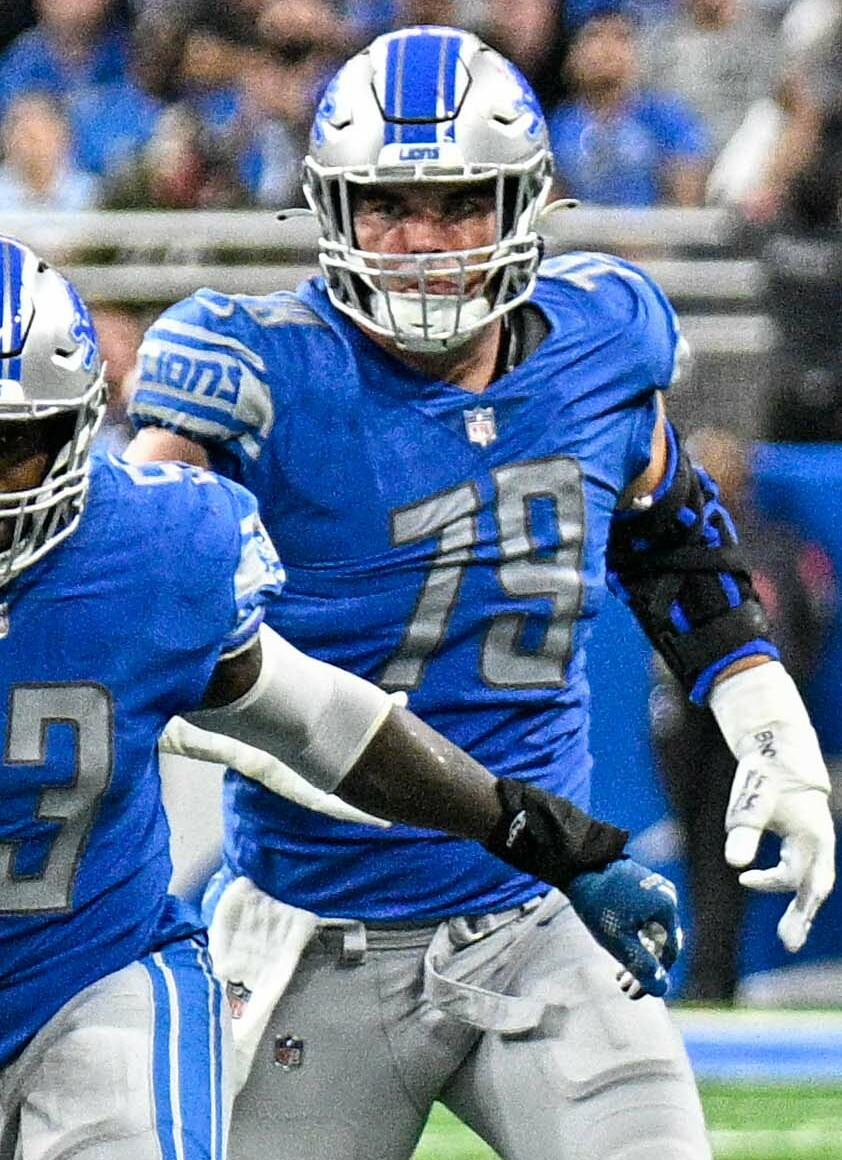
- Cominsky with the Detroit Lions in 2022

No. 50, 79
- Position: Defensive end

Personal information
- Born: November 22, 1995 (age 30); Barberton, Ohio, U.S.
- Listed height: 6 ft 5 in (1.96 m)
- Listed weight: 285 lb (129 kg)

Career information
- High school: Barberton
- College: Charleston (2014–2018)
- NFL draft: 2019: 4th round, 135th overall pick

Career history
- Atlanta Falcons (2019–2021); Detroit Lions (2022–2024)

Awards and highlights
- All-American (2018); 2× First-team All-MEC (2017, 2018); MEC Defensive Player of the Year (2018)

Career NFL statistics
- Total tackles: 107
- Sacks: 7.5
- Forced fumbles: 1
- Fumble recoveries: 1
- Pass deflections: 6
- Stats at Pro Football Reference

John Cominsky (born November 22, 1995) is an American former professional football player who was a defensive end in the National Football League (NFL). He played college football for the Charleston Golden Eagles and was selected by the Atlanta Falcons in the fourth round of the 2019 NFL draft.

== Professional career ==
Pre-draft measurables
Height	Weight	Arm length	Hand span	40-yard dash	10-yard split	20-yard split	20-yard shuttle	Three-cone drill	Vertical jump	Broad jump	Bench press
6 ft 5 1/4 in (1.96 m)	286 lb (130 kg)	33 1/2 in (0.85 m)	9 3/4 in (0.25 m)	4.69 s	1.61 s	2.78 s	4.38 s	7.03 s	33.5 in (0.85 m)	9 ft 8 in (2.95 m)	22 reps
All values from NFL Combine

=== Atlanta Falcons ===
Cominsky was selected by the Atlanta Falcons in the fourth round (135th overall) of the 2019 NFL draft. He played in 10 games as a rookie, recording 10 tackles and 0.5 sacks.

Cominsky was placed on the reserve/COVID-19 list by the Falcons on October 17, 2020, and was activated on October 30.

In Week 12 against the Las Vegas Raiders, Cominsky recorded his first career sack on Derek Carr during the 43–6 win.

On May 26, 2022, Cominsky was released by the Falcons.

=== Detroit Lions ===
On May 31, 2022, Cominsky was claimed off of waivers by the Detroit Lions. He played in 14 games with eight starts, recording 30 tackles, four sacks, and three passes defensed.

On March 15, 2023, Cominsky signed a two-year, $8.5 million contract extension with the Lions. In 16 games (11 starts) in 2023, he recorded 36 combined tackles, one pass deflection, and two sacks.

On July 30, 2024, Cominsky suffered a torn MCL in his right knee during a practice, ruling him out indefinitely. He was placed on injured reserve on August 29.

On March 31, 2025, Cominsky announced his retirement from the NFL, citing injuries.
