= Barberton High School (Ohio) =

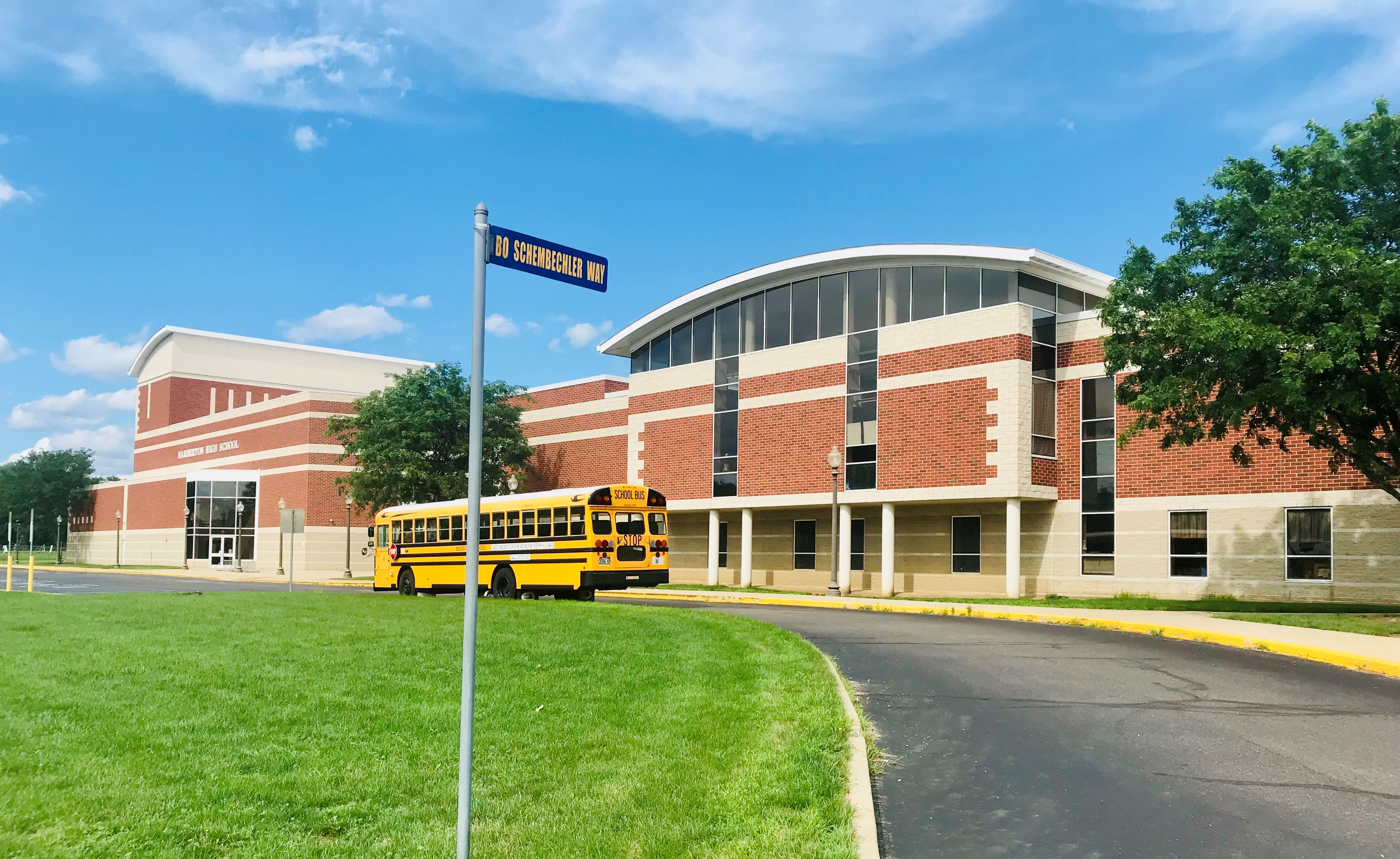

Location
- 555 Barber Road; Barberton, Ohio 44203; United States; 41°1′30″N 81°36′30″W

Information
- Type: Public
- School district: Barberton City School District
- NCES School ID: 390435300104
- Principal: Henry Muren
- Teaching staff: 79.00 (FTE)
- Grades: 9–12
- Enrollment: 1,186 (2024–25)
- Student to teacher ratio: 14.14
- Colors: Purple and white
- Athletics conference: Suburban League; American Conference
- Team name: Magics
- Accreditation: Ohio Department of Education
- Website: barbertonschools.org/barbertonhighschool_home.aspx

Barberton High School is a public high school in Barberton, Ohio, United States. It is the only high school in the Barberton City School District, serving 1,186 students in grades 9–12 as of the 2024–25 school year.

== Athletics ==
Barberton athletic teams are known as the Magics and compete in the Ohio High School Athletic Association (OHSAA) as a member of the Suburban League American Conference. School colors are purple and white.

=== State champions ===
- Football – 1947 (Note: From 1947 through 1971, the team named as champion by the Associated Press was generally regarded as the consensus state champion. OHSAA instituted a state playoff for football in 1972.)
- Boys' basketball – 1976
- Boys' track and field – 1954

== Notable alumni ==
- Bob Addis, former professional baseball player in Major League Baseball (MLB)
- John Cominsky, professional football player in the National Football League (NFL)
- Glenn "Jeep" Davis, three-time Olympic Gold Medal winner and five-time world record holder in track and field; professional football player in the NFL
- Tom Dimitroff, Sr., professional football player in the Canadian Football League (CFL) and American Football League and head coach in the CFL
- Frank Goettge, decorated Marine of both World Wars
- Roger Hoover, songwriter and guitarist
- George Izo, former professional football player in the NFL
- David M. Kelley, founder of IDEO
- Scot Loeffler, head coach in college football
- John Mackovic, head football coach in the NFL
- Hal Naragon, former professional baseball player in MLB
- Lawrence Ricks, former professional football player in the NFL
- Alvin Robertson, former professional basketball player in the NBA; Olympic gold medalist
- Kenny Robertson, college basketball standout
- Sassy Stephie, professional wrestler
- Bo Schembechler, head football coach at the University of Michigan, 1969–1989
- Betty Sutton, member of the United States House of Representatives from Ohio's 13th congressional district, 2007–2013
- Bob Toneff, former professional football player in the NFL
- Joe Williams, professional football player in the NFL
- Howard Woodford, recipient of the Medal of Honor
