= Kenny Robertson (basketball) =

American basketball player (born c. 1969)

Personal information
- Born: c. 1969
- Listed height: 6 ft 0 in (1.83 m)

Career information
- High school: Barberton (Barberton, Ohio)
- College: Cleveland State (1986–1990)
- NBA draft: 1990: undrafted
- Position: Guard

Career highlights
- NCAA steals leader (1989); Second-team All-Summit League (1990)

Kenny Robertson (born c. 1969) is an American former basketball player, known for his collegiate career at Cleveland State University in the late 1980s. From 1986 to 1990, Robertson set his mark as one of NCAA Division I men's basketball all-time steals leaders. Through 2020–21 he remains #15 all-time in Division I career steals with 341. He was the country's steals per game leader as a junior in 1988–89 with 3.96 per game, and he set Summit League single game (12) and career steals totals.

He finished his career at Cleveland State with 892 points, 339 rebounds, 420 assists, and 341 steals.

== See also ==
- List of NCAA Division I men's basketball players with 11 or more steals in a game
- List of NCAA Division I men's basketball season steals leaders
- List of NCAA Division I men's basketball career steals leaders
