= 1963–64 Fenn College Foxes men's basketball team =

American college basketball season

1963–64 Fenn College Foxes men's basketball
- Conference: Independent
- Record: 10–9
- Head coach: Jim Rodriguez
- Home arena: Cathedral Latin High School; St. Stanislaus High School

The 1963–64 Fenn College Foxes men's basketball team represented Fenn College in the 1963–64 college basketball season. They participated in the NCAA College Division. The team was led by fifth-year head coach Jim Rodriguez. In 1962–63, the Foxes finished 9–9. All home games were played at Cathedral Latin High School except for two games. Those two games were on February 11, 1964, and February 19, 1964, and played at St. Stanislaus High School. The 10–9 season marked the first winning season for Fenn College since the 1949–50 season. It also matched the highest win total in school history. It was the 33rd season of Cleveland State basketball.

== Schedule ==
Date	Opponent	Rank	Location	Result	Overall
Regular Season Games
November 30, 1963	Kenyon College		Cleveland, OH	W 66–42	1–0
December 3, 1963	Ashland		Away	W 61–55	2–0
December 7, 1963	Detroit Tech		Cleveland, OH	W 90–58	3–0
December 10, 1963	Walsh		Cleveland, OH	W 112–72	4–0
December 13, 1963	Slippery Rock		Away	L 57–73	4–1
January 7, 1964	Edinboro		Away	L 82–94	4–2
January 10, 1964	Case Western		Away	L 72–97	4–3
January 22, 1964	Allegheny College		Away	W 83–63	5–3
January 25, 1964	Thiel College		Away	W 92–77	6–3
January 28, 1964	Cedarville College		Cleveland, OH	L 77–93	6–4
February 1, 1964	Clarion		Away	L 81–95	6–5
February 4, 1964	Hiram College		Away	L 74–77	6–6
February 8, 1964	Heidelberg College		Away	L 69–95	6–7
February 11, 1964	Western Reserve		Cleveland, OH	W 75–67	7–7
February 13, 1964	Malone College		Cleveland, OH	W 93–84	8–7
February 19, 1964	Case Tech		Cleveland, OH	W 74–52	9–7
February 22, 1964	Indiana State College		Cleveland, OH	L 70–91	9–8
February 26, 1964	John Carroll		Away	L 64–73	9–9
March 3, 1964	Carnegie Tech		Cleveland, OH	W 80–74	10–9
