= 1985–86 Cleveland State Vikings men's basketball team =

American college basketball season

1985–86 Cleveland State Vikings men's basketball

AMCU-8 Regular Season Champions AMCU-8 tournament champions

Sweet Sixteen vs. Navy, L, 70–71
- Conference: Association of Mid-Continent Universities

Ranking
- Coaches: No. 17
- AP: No. RV
- Record: 29–4 (13–1 AMCU-8)
- Head coach: Kevin Mackey (3rd season)
- Home arena: Woodling Gym

1985–86 AMCU-8 Conference men's basketball standings
	Conf.				Overall
Team	W		L	PCT	W		L	PCT
Cleveland State †	13	–	1	.929	29	–	4	.879
Southwest Missouri State	10	–	4	.714	24	–	8	.750
Eastern Illinois	8	–	6	.571	19	–	13	.594
Western Illinois	7	–	7	.500	13	–	15	.464
Illinois–Chicago	7	–	7	.500	13	–	16	.448
Valparaiso	5	–	9	.357	9	–	19	.321
Wisconsin–Green Bay	3	–	11	.214	5	–	23	.179
Northern Iowa	3	–	11	.214	8	–	19	.296
† 1986 AMCU-8 tournament winner

The 1985–86 Cleveland State Vikings men's basketball team represented Cleveland State University in the 1985–86 NCAA Division I men's basketball season. The team was led by third-year head coach Kevin Mackey. In 1984–85, the Vikings finished 21–8 (11–3 in the AMCU-8). It was the 55th season of Cleveland State basketball.

== Regular season ==
Cleveland State finished the regular season with a 24–3 record and 13–1 in the AMCU-8. That record earned them a #1 seed in the AMCU-8 postseason tournament. They defeated Northern Iowa, Illinois-Chicago, and Eastern Illinois to win the AMCU-8 tournament, however the AMCU-8 would not receive an automatic berth in the NCAA Tournament until the 1986-87 season. Nonetheless, Cleveland State received an at large invitation to the NCAA Tournament based on their overall resume. Cleveland State also won 14 games in a row, a school record that still stands today. The streak started on February 27 at Kent State and lasted all the way until they lost to Navy in the Sweet Sixteen on March 21. In the final AP Top 20 poll of the season Cleveland State received 4 points.

== Postseason ==
Cleveland State earned a trip to the NCAA Tournament. They were the #14 seed. They defeated Indiana, and St. Joseph, before losing to Navy 71–70. Cleveland State became the first #14 seed to make it to the Sweet Sixteen. The next season the Vikings started the season ranked 20th in the AP Poll. There was no post NCAA Tournament coaches poll in 1986. Cleveland State was ranked 17th in the final USA Today poll. Cleveland State also set a school record for wins in a season at 29, a record that also still stands today. Clinton Smith was named Cleveland States Varsity "C" Club Player of the Year. Ken McFadden was named an All-American fifth team by Basketball Weekly. Clinton Ransey was also a Sporting News honorable mention All-American. Clinton Ransey and Clinton Smith were each named to the AMCU-8 first team. Ken McFadden was named to the AMCU-8 all-newcomer team. Keven Mackey was named the AMCU-8 coach of the year for the 2nd year in a row. Finally Ken McFadden and Clinton Smith were named to the AMCU-8 all-tournament team.

== Roster ==
1985–86 Cleveland State Vikings men's basketball team
Players
Coaches

Pos.	#	Name	Height	Weight	Year	Hometown
F	00	Warren Bradley	6 ft 8 in (2.03 m)	—	Fr
G	4	Shawn Hood	5 ft 7 in (1.7 m)	—	Jr
G	5	Eddie Bryant	5 ft 10 in (1.78 m)	—	Jr
G	10	Ken McFadden	6 ft 1 in (1.85 m)	—	Fr
G	21	Steve Corbin	6 ft 2 in (1.88 m)	—	Sr
G	22	Vince Richards	6 ft 3 in (1.91 m)	—	Sr
F	23	Hersey Strong	6 ft 5 in (1.96 m)	—	So
F	24	Clinton Smith	6 ft 6 in (1.98 m)	—	Sr
G	25	John Martin	—	—	So
F	30	Paul Stewart	6 ft 6 in (1.98 m)	—	So
G	31	Tyrone Kingwood	6 ft 2 in (1.88 m)	—	So
C	33	Eric Mudd	6 ft 8 in (2.03 m)	—	Jr
F	34	Ray Salters	6 ft 2 in (1.88 m)	—	Jr
C	40	Bob Crawford	6 ft 9 in (2.06 m)	—	Sr
F	42	Pat Vuyancih	6 ft 5 in (1.96 m)	—	Jr
F	44	Clinton Ransey	6 ft 5 in (1.96 m)	—	Jr
C	50	Elgin Womack	6 ft 9 in (2.06 m)	—	Jr
		Morris Butler	6 ft 1 in (1.85 m)	185 lb (84 kg)

Head coach

- Kevin Mackey (Saint Anselm)

Assistant coach(es)

Legend

- (C) Team captain
- (S) Suspended
- (I) Ineligible
- (W) Walk-on
- Injured
- Current redshirt

Roster
Last update: 2014-01-03

== Statistics ==
- Points: Clinton Ransey 535
- PPG: Clinton Smith 16.2
- Rebounds: Eric Mudd 288
- RPG: Eric Mudd 9.6
- Field Goals: Clinton Smith 226
- FG%: Clinton Smith .565
- Assists: Eddie Bryant 146
- APG: Eddie Bryant 4.4
- Blocks: Bob Crawford 25
- BPG: Bob Crawford 0.8
- Steals: Clinton Ransey 67
- SPG: Clint Ransey 2.03
- Free Throws: Ken McFadden 99
- FT%: Ken McFadden .797

== AMCU-8 Conference standings ==
#	Team	Conference	Pct.	Overall	Pct.
1	Cleveland State	13–1	.929	29–4	.879
2	Southwest Missouri State	10–4	.714	24–8	.750
3	Eastern Illinois	8–6	.571	19–13	.594
4	Western Illinois	7–7	.500	13–15	.464
5	Illinois Chicago	7–7	.500	13–16	.448
6	Valparaiso	5–9	.357	9–19	.321
7	Wisconsin–Green Bay	3–11	.214	5–23	.179
8	Northern Iowa	3–11	.214	8–19	.296

== Schedule ==
AMCU-8 standing: 1st
Date	Opponent*	Rank*	Location	Time^{#}	Result	Overall	Conference
**Regular season games**
November 25, 1985	Clarion		Cleveland, OH		W 105–65	1–0	0–0
November 30, 1985	Central Connecticut State		Cleveland, OH		W 118–66	2–0	0–0
December 2, 1985	Youngstown State		Cleveland, OH		W 101–69	3–0	0–0
December 3, 1985	Ohio Wesleyan		Cleveland, OH		W 98–49	4–0	0–0
December 7, 1985	Ohio State		Columbus, OH		L 95–99	4–1	0–0
December 10, 1985	Akron		Cleveland, OH		W 88–76	5–1	0–0
December 14, 1985	Kent State		Cleveland, OH		W 101–76	6–1	0–0
December 21, 1985	Eastern Michigan		Cleveland, OH		W 108–59	7–1	0–0
December 23, 1985	Maryland Eastern Shore		Princess Anne, MD		W 90–56	8–1	0–0
December 29, 1985	#2 Michigan		Ann Arbor, MI		L 85–105	8–2	0–0
January 4, 1986	Utica		Cleveland, OH		W 92–61	9–2	0–0
January 11, 1986	**Wisconsin–Green Bay**		Green Bay, WI		W 76–59	10–2	1–0
January 13, 1986	**Illinois Chicago**		Chicago, IL		W 101–77	11–2	2–0
January 15, 1986	DePaul		Chicago, IL		W 90–75	12–2	2–0
January 18, 1986	**Northern Iowa**		Cleveland, OH		W 102–88	13–2	3–0
January 20, 1986	**Western Illinois**		Cleveland, OH		W 60–53	14–2	4–0
January 22, 1986	**Eastern Illinois**		Charleston, IL		W 112–89	15–2	5–0
January 25, 1986	**Southwest Missouri State**		Springfield, MO		L 61–65	15–3	5–1
January 27, 1986	Kent State		Kent, OH		W 75–55	16–3	5–1
February 1, 1986	**Valparaiso**		Cleveland, OH		W 91–66	17–3	6–1
February 8, 1986	**Wisconsin–Green Bay**		Cleveland, OH		W 103–64	18–3	7–1
February 12, 1986	**Illinois Chicago**		Cleveland, OH		W 113–75	19–3	8–1
February 15, 1986	**Northern Iowa**		Cedar Falls, IA		W 80–65	20–3	9–1
February 17, 1986	**Western Illinois**		Macomb, IL		W 76–64	21–3	10–1
February 22, 1986	**Southwest Missouri State**		Cleveland, OH		W 94–67	22–3	11–1
February 24, 1986	**Eastern Illinois**		Cleveland, OH		W 76–68	23–3	12–1
February 27, 1986	**Valparaiso**		Valparaiso, IN		W 72–50	24–3	13–1
**AMCU-8 Conference tournament**
March 6, 1986	**Northern Iowa**		Springfield, MO		W 73–68	25–3	13–1
March 7, 1986	**Illinois Chicago**		Springfield, MO		W 100–84	26–3	13–1
March 8, 1986	**Eastern Illinois**		Springfield, MO		W 70–66	27–3	13–1
**NCAA tournament**
March 14, 1986	#16 Indiana		Syracuse, NY		W 83–79	28–3	13–1
March 16, 1986	Saint Joseph's		Syracuse, NY		W 75–69	29–3	13–1
March 21, 1986	#17 Navy		East Rutherford, NJ		L 70–71	29–4	13–1
*Rank according to AP Top 20 Poll. ^{#}All times are in EST. Conference games in **BOLD**.

== Rankings ==
Ranking movement Legend: ██ Improvement in ranking. ██ Decrease in ranking. ██ Not ranked the previous week. rv=Others receiving votes.
Poll	Pre	Wk 1	Wk 2	Wk 3	Wk 4	Wk 5	Wk 6	Wk 7	Wk 8	Wk 9	Wk 10	Wk 11	Wk 12	Wk 13	Wk 14	Wk 15	Final
AP	NR	NR	NR	NR	NR	NR	NR	NR	NR	RV	NR	RV	NR	RV	RV	RV	RV
