= Darren Tillis =

American basketball player (born 1960)

Personal information
- Born: February 23, 1960 (age 66) Dallas, Texas, U.S.
- Listed height: 6 ft 11 in (2.11 m)
- Listed weight: 215 lb (98 kg)

Career information
- High school: Lincoln (Dallas, Texas)
- College: Cleveland State (1978–1982)
- NBA draft: 1982: 1st round, 23rd overall pick
- Drafted by: Boston Celtics
- Playing career: 1982–1995
- Position: Center / power forward
- Number: 52, 25, 22

Career history
- 1982–1983: Boston Celtics
- 1983: Cleveland Cavaliers
- 1983–1984: Golden State Warriors
- 1984–1986: Scavolini Pesaro
- 1988–1989: Tenerife
- 1990–1991: San Jose Jammers
- 1993–1995: Ockelbo Basket
- Stats at NBA.com
- Stats at Basketball Reference

Darren Tillis (born February 23, 1960) is an American former professional basketball player who was selected by the Boston Celtics in the first round (23rd pick overall) of the 1982 NBA draft. A 6'11" center born in Dallas, Texas Tillis spent his college career at Cleveland State University. He then played two full NBA seasons, for the Celtics, Cleveland Cavaliers and Golden State Warriors.

In his NBA career, Tillis played in 124 games and scored a total of 425 points. Arguably his best game came on March 22, 1983, when he scored 22 points and grabbed 18 rebounds in a Cleveland loss at Kansas City.

After his professional career, Tillis has been a coach for multiple college basketball programs, including Marshall University, and Southern Methodist University. As of April 2010 he has been the assistant coach for University of Central Florida.

== Career statistics ==
Legend
GP	Games played	GS	Games started	MPG	Minutes per game
FG%	Field goal percentage	3P%	3-point field goal percentage	FT%	Free throw percentage
RPG	Rebounds per game	APG	Assists per game	SPG	Steals per game
BPG	Blocks per game	PPG	Points per game	**Bold**	Career high

=== NBA ===
==== Regular season ====
Year	Team	GP	GS	MPG	FG%	3P%	FT%	RPG	APG	SPG	BPG	PPG
1982–83	Boston	15	0	2.9	.304	.000	.333	.6	.1	.0	.1	1.1
1982–83	Cleveland	37	**4**	**13.0**	**.437**	–	.636	**3.3**	**.4**	**.2**	**.8**	**4.1**
1983–84	Golden State	**72**	1	10.1	.425	.000	**.651**	2.6	.3	.2	**.8**	3.6
Career		124	5	10.1	.423	.000	.626	2.5	.3	.2	.7	3.4
