= Franklin Edwards =

American basketball player

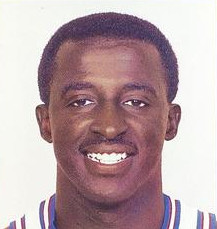
- Edwards, circa 1986

Personal information
- Born: February 2, 1959 (age 67) New York City, New York, U.S.
- Listed height: 6 ft 1 in (1.85 m)
- Listed weight: 170 lb (77 kg)

Career information
- High school: Julia Richman (Manhattan, New York)
- College: Cleveland State (1977–1981)
- NBA draft: 1981: 1st round, 22nd overall pick
- Drafted by: Philadelphia 76ers
- Playing career: 1981–1988
- Position: Point guard
- Number: 14, 22, 10

Career history
- 1981–1984: Philadelphia 76ers
- 1984–1985: Lancaster Lightning
- 1985–1986: Los Angeles Clippers
- 1986–1988: Sacramento Kings

Career highlights
- NBA champion (1983); No. 14 retired by Cleveland State Vikings
- Stats at NBA.com
- Stats at Basketball Reference

Franklin Delano Edwards (born February 2, 1959) is an American former professional basketball player who was selected by the Philadelphia 76ers in the first round (22nd pick overall) of the 1981 NBA draft. A 6'1" point guard from Cleveland State University, Edwards played in 7 NBA seasons from 1981 to 1988. He played for the 76ers, Los Angeles Clippers and Sacramento Kings.

In his NBA career, Edwards played in 296 games and scored a total of 1,802 points. His best year as a professional came during the 1985–86 NBA season as a member of the Clippers, appearing in 73 games and averaging 9.0 ppg.

== Career statistics ==
Legend
| GP | Games played | GS | Games started | MPG | Minutes per game |
| FG% | Field goal percentage | 3P% | 3-point field goal percentage | FT% | Free throw percentage |
| RPG | Rebounds per game | APG | Assists per game | SPG | Steals per game |
| BPG | Blocks per game | PPG | Points per game | **Bold** | Career high |
| † | Won an NBA championship |

=== NBA ===
==== Regular season ====
| Year | Team | GP | GS | MPG | FG% | 3P% | FT% | RPG | APG | SPG | BPG | PPG |
|---|---|---|---|---|---|---|---|---|---|---|---|---|
| 1981–82 | Philadelphia | 42 | 3 | 6.9 | .433 | .000 | .741 | .6 | 1.1 | .4 | **.1** | 3.6 |
| 1982–83† | Philadelphia | **81** | 3 | 15.6 | .472 | .000 | .761 | 1.0 | 2.7 | 1.0 | **.1** | 6.7 |
| 1983–84 | Philadelphia | 60 | 0 | 10.9 | .380 | .000 | .708 | 1.0 | 1.5 | .5 | **.1** | 3.4 |
| 1984–85 | L.A. Clippers | 16 | 0 | 12.4 | **.545** | – | .792 | .9 | 2.4 | 1.1 | .0 | 5.7 |
| 1985–86 | L.A. Clippers | 73 | **19** | 20.4 | .454 | **.111** | **.874** | 1.2 | 3.5 | **1.2** | **.1** | **9.0** |
| 1986–87 | Sacramento | 8 | 0 | 15.3 | .281 | .000 | .714 | **1.3** | 3.6 | .6 | .0 | 3.5 |
| 1987–88 | Sacramento | 16 | 11 | **25.9** | .470 | .000 | .750 | 1.2 | **5.8** | .6 | **.1** | 8.3 |
| Career | | 296 | 36 | 15.0 | .449 | .030 | .795 | 1.0 | 2.6 | .8 | .1 | 6.1 |

=== Playoffs ===
| Year | Team | GP | MPG | FG% | 3P% | FT% | RPG | APG | SPG | BPG | PPG |
|---|---|---|---|---|---|---|---|---|---|---|---|
| 1982 | Philadelphia | 9 | 3.6 | **.600** | **1.000** | **.889** | .6 | .6 | .3 | .0 | **3.7** |
| 1983† | Philadelphia | **12** | **8.4** | .406 | – | .824 | **.8** | **1.4** | **.4** | .0 | 3.3 |
| Career | | 21 | 6.3 | .481 | 1.000 | .846 | .7 | 1.0 | .4 | .0 | 3.5 |
