= Ken McFadden =

American basketball player

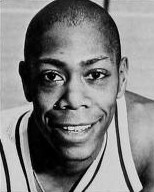
McFadden, circa 1988

Ken "Mouse" McFadden is a former basketball player. He attended Seward Park High School in New York. He played at Cleveland State University from 1985–1989. He helped lead Cleveland State to three postseason appearances and a trip to the Sweet Sixteen. His number 10 is one of only four numbers to have been retired by Cleveland State. He scored 2,256 points for the Vikings from 1985 to 1989, which is still the Cleveland State record for career points scored. He finished his college career as the all-time leading scorer in Mid-Continent Conference history. He also played in the CBA and USBL. He then went to work for Cleveland State's athletic department before being fired for accusing associate athletic director Chris Sedlock of writing numerous papers for basketball players.

He was involved in a motor vehicle accident in which his daughter was driving and struck a child when the car went over the curb at City Barbeque in Beachwood on June 21, 2026. He was charged with obstructing official business and wrongful entrustment after lying to police and claiming that he was the one driving the car.
