= Cleveland State Vikings men's basketball =

Men's college basketball team

2026–27 Cleveland State Vikings men's basketball team
- University: Cleveland State University
- Head coach: Rob Summers (2nd season)
- Location: Cleveland, Ohio
- Arena: Wolstein Center (capacity: 13,610)
- Conference: Horizon League
- Nickname: Vikings
- Colors: Forest green and white

NCAA Division I tournament Sweet Sixteen
- 1986

NCAA Division I tournament appearances
- 1986, 2009, 2021

Conference tournament champions
- 1986, 2009, 2021

Conference regular-season champions
- 1985, 1986, 1993, 2011, 2021, 2022

Uniforms
Home	Away

Cleveland State Vikings men's basketball is the men's college basketball team that represents Cleveland State University. Prior to rebranding from Fenn College, they were known as the Fenn College Foxes. Cleveland State has been in Division I since 1972 and are currently led by first-year head coach Rob Summers. They have been a member of the Horizon League since 1994. Cleveland State was formerly in the Mid-Continent Conference (1982–1994). Prior to 1982, Cleveland State was an independent program. The Vikings have appeared in three NCAA Tournaments, most recently in 2021. In 1986, Cleveland State advanced to the NCAA Sweet 16.

== History ==
The 1985–86 season is arguably the most memorable in Vikings history, as they achieved the improbable in becoming the first ever 14th seeded team to make it to the Sweet Sixteen of the 1986 NCAA tournament. Coach Kevin Mackey's squad, led by Ken 'Mouse' McFadden and Eric Mudd, upset Bobby Knight's 3rd seeded Indiana Hoosiers, by a final of 83-79. Following a 75-69 second round win against 6th seeded St.Joseph's, the Vikings would ultimately lose to Navy 71-70 on a clutch basket in the waning seconds by future Hall of Famer, David Robinson. Cleveland State would qualify for the NIT Tournament the following two seasons, but went 23 seasons until returning to the NCAA Tournament.

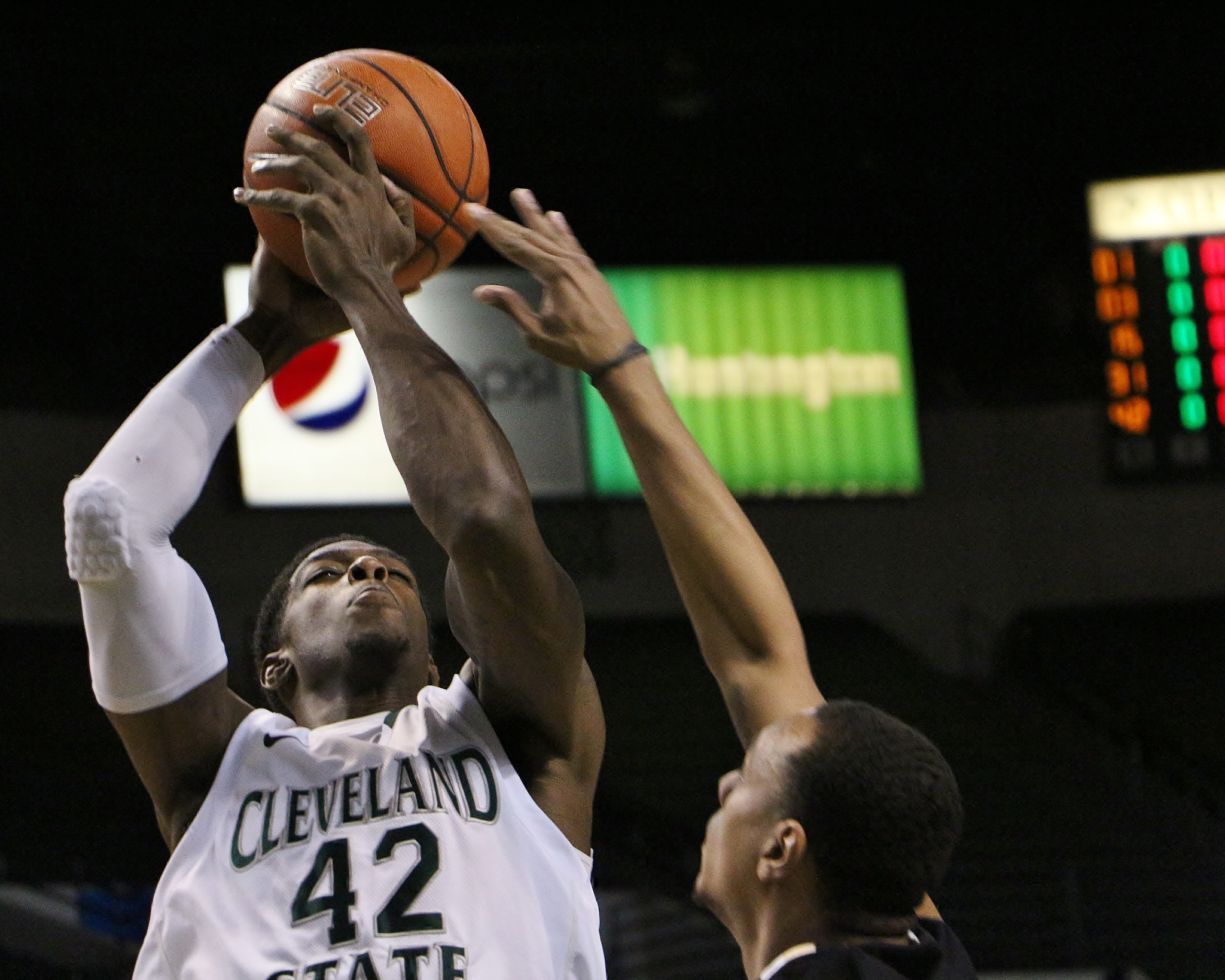
A Cleveland State men's basketball game in 2015

On December 15, 2008, Cleveland State had their biggest regular season victory in school history, upsetting the #11 Syracuse Orange, 72-69, on a last-second, three-quarter court shot from senior guard Cedric Jackson. It was CSU's third-ever win over a Top 25 ranked opponent, and first ever on the road. They would pick up their fourth and fifth wins over Top 25 opponents later that same season when they won at #17 Butler in the championship game of the Horizon League Tournament 57-54, and then in the first round of the 2009 NCAA tournament when, as the 13th seeded team in the Midwest bracket, they routed 4th seeded and #12 Wake Forest by a final score of 84-69.

=== Records ===
==== Record versus Horizon League ====
Records vs. Horizon League schools as of the end of the 2020–2021 school year.

Rival	Record (W-L)	Win %
Detroit	27–45	.375
Green Bay	32–51	.386
UIC	48–40	.545
IUPUI	6–4	.600
Milwaukee	26–31	.456
Northern Kentucky	6–7	.462
Oakland	11–11	.500
Purdue Fort Wayne	6–2	.750
Robert Morris	10–7	.588
Wright State	35–42	.455
Youngstown State	53–44	.546

==== Record versus Ohio schools ====
Records vs. Ohio schools as of the end of the 2015–2016 school year.

Rival	Record (W-L)	Win %
Akron	31–37	.456
Ashland	5–26	.161
Baldwin Wallace	1–11	.083
Bowling Green	8–10	.444
Case Tech	3–12	.200
Case Western Reserve	1–0	1.000
Cedarville	5–8	.385
Central State	3–6	.333
Cincinnati	0–11	.000
Dayton	3–3	.500
Defiance	0–1	.000
Denison	1–0	1.000
Findlay	1–10	.091
Heidelberg	1–11	.083
Hiram	29–35	.453
John Carroll	15–31	.326
Kent State	20–28	.417
Kent State-Canton	4–0	1.000
Kenyon	8–20	.286
Malone	9–2	.818
Marietta	2–1	.667
Miami (OH)	0–5	.000
Muskingum	2–0	1.000

Rival	Record (W-L)	Win %
Mount Union	1–20	.048
Mount Vernon Nazarene	1–0	1.000
Notre Dame (OH)	4–0	1.000
Oberlin	3–13	.188
Ohio	2–11	.154
Ohio Chiropody	3–0	1.000
Ohio Dominican	1–0	1.000
Ohio Northern	4–6	.400
Ohio State	1–7	.125
Ohio Wesleyan	2–0	1.000
Otterbein	0–2	.000
Rio Grand	3–0	1.000
Tiffin	3–0	1.000
Toledo	5–9	.357
Urbana	1–0	1.000
Walsh	6–1	.857
Western Reserve	9–29	.237
Wilberforce	3–0	1.000
Wilmington (OH)	1–0	1.000
Wooster	2–7	.222
Wright State	33–33	.500
Xavier (OH)	8–5	.615
Youngstown State	44–39	.530

== Cleveland State wins vs. the AP Top 25 ==
Year	Opponent	Date	Score	Site
1985-86	#16 Indiana	3-14-86	W 83–79	Neutral
2007-08	#12 Butler	1-17-08	W 56-52	Home
2008-09	#11 Syracuse #17 Butler #12 Wake Forest	12-15-08; 3-10-09; 3-20-09	W 72-69; W 57–54; W 84-69	Away; Away; Neutral
2011-12	#7 Vanderbilt	11-13-11	W 71-58	Away

== Awards ==
AMCU/Mid Continent Player of the Year

- Ken McFadden – 1988

AMCU/Mid Continent Coach of the Year

- Kevin Mackey - 1985, 1986
- Mike Boyd - 1993

AMCU/Mid Continent Newcomer of the Year

- Clinton Smith - 1985
- Sam Mitchell, 1993

Horizon League Player of the Year

- Norris Cole - 2011

Horizon League Newcomer of the Year

- Damon Stringer - 2000
- Bryn Forbes - 2013
- Je’Shawn Stevenson - 2025

Horizon League Defensive Player of the Year

- Cedric Jackson - 2009
- Norris Cole - 2011
- Tre Gomillion - 2021
- D'Moi Hodge - 2022

Horizon League Sixth Man of the Year

- Jon Harris - 2014
- Chase Robinson - 2025

Horizon League Coach of the Year

- Gary Waters - 2008
- Dennis Gates - 2020, 2021

HoopDirt.com Division I Coach of the Year

- Dennis Gates - 2021

=== Attendance ===
==== Year-by-year ====
Year	Rank	Games	Total	Average
1978	248	13	15,338	1,180
1979	200	11	22,839	2,076
1980	213	15	29,147	1,943
1981	177	14	34,781	2,484
1982	217	13	25,744	1,980
1983	236	10	15,808	1,581
1984	243	18	25,071	1,393
1985	208	16	32,349	2,022
1986	171	15	37,211	2,481
1987	158	14	43,347	3,096
1988	152	15	50,868	3,391
1989	198	13	31,370	2,413
1990	251	15	24,730	1,649
1991	225	13	26,574	2,044
1992	130	15	60,681	4,045
1993	129	12	50,960	4,247
1994	?	14	47,400	3,386
1995	?	11	36,037	3,276
1996	?	13	23,013	1,770
1997	?	12	55,070	4,589
1998	?	13	53,912	4,147
1999	?	14	53,838	3,846
2000	?	14	50,685	3,620
2001	?	13	41,884	3,222
2002	?	16	48,968	3,061
2003	?	13	23,694	1,823
2004	?	13	32,327	2,487
2005	?	12	29,016	2,418
2006	?	16	32,197	2,012
2007	?	14	36,662	2,619
2008	?	14	36,888	2,635
2009	?	15	35,918	2,395
2010	?	17	39,968	2,351
2011	?	20	62,242	3,112
2012	?	14	45,640	3,260
2013	?	14	30,332	2,167
2014	?	15	33,545	2,236
2015	?	16	29,943	1,996
2015-16	?	10	14,093	1,409
2016-17	?	13	18,195	1,400
2017-18	?	14	16,066	1,148
2018-19	296	17	18,956	1,115
2019-20	--	14	21,014	1,501

==== Largest Crowds ====
===== Wolstein Center =====
Attendance	Opponent	Date
13,055	Michigan	December 7, 1991
11,534	North Carolina	November 29, 2003
10,123	Michigan	November 30, 1996
9,568	Georgetown	November 23, 1996
9,106	Valparaiso	February 20, 1993
8,490	Butler	February 5, 2011
8,106	Cincinnati	January 13, 1993
7,333	Butler	February 10, 2001
7,163	Michigan State	December 7, 1993
6,912	Xavier	January 5, 1995
6,203	Michigan State	December 6, 1997
6,109	Temple	December 27, 1999

===== Woodling Gym =====
Attendance	Opponent	Date
3,688	Eastern Illinois	February 24, 1986
3,599	Southwest Missouri State	February 22, 1986
3,429	Valparaiso	March 2, 1985
3,355	Illinois State	February 23, 1981
3,333	Valparaiso	February 1, 1981
3,302	Western Illinois	January 20, 1986
3,282	Illinois Chicago	February 22, 1988
3,262	Southwest Missouri State	February 15, 1988
3,252	Northern Iowa	January 18, 1986
3,247	Northern Iowa	March 2, 1987

===== Public Auditorium =====
Attendance	Opponent	Date
7,443	Illinois State	March 16, 1987
7,441	Marquette	January 29, 1981
5,424	Illinois State	March 18, 1988
4,437	Michigan State	December 12, 1983
4,132	Wilberforce	January 28, 1978
4,130	Southwest Missouri State	January 28, 1989

==== NBA draft history ====
- 8 total NBA draft picks.

Regular Draft

Year	Round	Pick	Overall	Player	Team
1965	11	4	87	Weldon Kytle	St. Louis Hawks
1977	7	11	142	Dave Kyle	Boston Celtics
1978	6	14	124	Dave Kyle	Milwaukee Bucks
1981	1	22	22	Franklin Edwards	Philadelphia 76ers
1981	9	4	187	Paul Roba	Cleveland Cavaliers
1982	1	23	23	Darren Tillis	Boston Celtics
1986	5	4	97	Clinton Smith	Golden State Warriors
2011	1	28	28	Norris Cole	Chicago Bulls

=== Record by year ===
School	Season	Record	(Conf. Record)	Postseason	Coach
Fenn College	1929–30	5-5	(N/A)	--	Homer E. Woodling
Fenn College	1930–31	8-7	(N/A)	--	Homer E. Woodling
Fenn College	1931–32	7-7	(N/A)	--	Homer E. Woodling
Fenn College	1932–33	4-6	(N/A)	--	Homer E. Woodling
Fenn College	1933–34	5-11	(N/A)	--	Homer E. Woodling
Fenn College	1934–35	5-12	(N/A)	--	Homer E. Woodling
Fenn College	1935–36	4-11	(N/A)	--	Homer E. Woodling
Fenn College	1936–37	8-9	(N/A)	--	Homer E. Woodling
Fenn College	1937–38	6-10	(N/A)	--	Homer E. Woodling
Fenn College	1938–39	3-13	(N/A)	--	Homer E. Woodling
Fenn College	1939–40	4-11	(N/A)	--	Homer E. Woodling
Fenn College	1940–41	4-11	(N/A)	--	Homer E. Woodling
Fenn College	1941–42	2-12	(N/A)	--	Bruce T. Brickley
Fenn College	1942–43	0-13	(N/A)	--	Aaron L. Andrews
Fenn College	1943–44	(N/A)	(N/A)	--	(N/A)
Fenn College	1944–45	(N/A)	(N/A)	--	(N/A)
Fenn College	1945–46	1-8	(N/A)	--	George McKinnon
Fenn College	1946–47	5-10	(N/A)	--	George McKinnon
Fenn College	1947–48	10-8	(N/A)	--	George McKinnon
Fenn College	1948–49	4-14	(N/A)	--	George McKinnon
Fenn College	1949–50	9-8	(N/A)	--	George Rung
Fenn College	1950–51	6-11	(N/A)	--	George Rung
Fenn College	1951–52	4-12	(N/A)	--	George Rung
Fenn College	1952–53	2-15	(N/A)	--	Homer E. Woodling
Fenn College	1953–54	1-18	(N/A)	--	George Rung
Fenn College	1954–55	2-15	(N/A)	--	George Rung
Fenn College	1955–56	3-15	(N/A)	--	George Rung
Fenn College	1956–57	3-15	(N/A)	--	George Rung
Fenn College	1957–58	6-13	(N/A)	--	George Rung
Fenn College	1958–59	7-12	(N/A)	--	Bill Gallagher
Fenn College	1959–60	0-19	(N/A)	--	Jim Rodriguez
Fenn College	1960–61	4-15	(N/A)	--	Jim Rodriguez
Fenn College	1961–62	6-13	(N/A)	--	Jim Rodriguez
Fenn College	1962–63	9-9	(N/A)	--	Jim Rodriguez
Fenn College	1963–64	10-9	(N/A)	--	Jim Rodriguez
Fenn College	1964–65	10-9	(N/A)	--	Jim Rodriguez
Cleveland State	1965–66	4-14	(N/A)	--	Jim Rodriguez
Cleveland State	1966–67	8-13	(N/A)	--	John McLendon
Cleveland State	1967–68	7-15	(N/A)	--	John McLendon
Cleveland State	1968–69	12-14	(N/A)	--	John McLendon
Cleveland State	1969–70	5-21	(N/A)	--	Ray Dieringer
Cleveland State	1970–71	5-20	(N/A)	--	Ray Dieringer
Cleveland State	1971–72	8-18	(N/A)	--	Ray Dieringer
Cleveland State	1972–73	9-14	(N/A)	--	Ray Dieringer
Cleveland State	1973–74	6-20	(N/A)	--	Ray Dieringer
Cleveland State	1974–75	13-11	(N/A)	--	Ray Dieringer
Cleveland State	1975–76	6-19	(N/A)	--	Ray Dieringer
Cleveland State	1976–77	10-17	(N/A)	--	Ray Dieringer
Cleveland State	1977–78	12-13	(N/A)	--	Ray Dieringer
Cleveland State	1978–79	15-10	(N/A)	--	Ray Dieringer
Cleveland State	1979–80	17-9	(N/A)	--	Ray Dieringer
Cleveland State	1980–81	18-9	(N/A)	--	Ray Dieringer
Cleveland State	1981–82	17-10	(N/A)	--	Ray Dieringer
Cleveland State	1982–83	8-20	(1-4)	--	Ray Dieringer
Cleveland State	1983–84	14-16	(4-10)	--	Kevin Mackey
Cleveland State	1984–85	21-8	(11-3)	--	Kevin Mackey
Cleveland State	1985–86	29-4	(13-1)	NCAA, Sweet Sixteen	Kevin Mackey
Cleveland State	1986–87	25-8	(10-4)	NIT, Second Round	Kevin Mackey
Cleveland State	1987–88	22-8	(11-3)	NIT, Second Round	Kevin Mackey
Cleveland State	1988–89	16-12	(N/A)	--	Kevin Mackey
Cleveland State	1989–90	15-13	(N/A)	--	Kevin Mackey
Cleveland State	1990–91	12-16	(8-8)	--	Mike Boyd
Cleveland State	1991–92	16-13	(7-9)	--	Mike Boyd
Cleveland State	1992–93	22-6	(15-1)	--	Mike Boyd
Cleveland State	1993–94	14-15	(9-9)	--	Mike Boyd
Cleveland State	1994–95	10-17	(3-11)	--	Mike Boyd
Cleveland State	1995–96	5-21	(3-13)	--	Mike Boyd
Cleveland State	1996–97	9-19	(6-10)	--	Rollie Massimino
Cleveland State	1997–98	12-15	(6-8)	--	Rollie Massimino
Cleveland State	1998–99	14-14	(6-8)	--	Rollie Massimino
Cleveland State	1999–00	16-14	(9-5)	--	Rollie Massimino
Cleveland State	2000–01	19-13	(9-5)	--	Rollie Massimino
Cleveland State	2001–02	12-16	(6-10)	--	Rollie Massimino
Cleveland State	2002–03	8-22	(3-13)	--	Rollie Massimino
Cleveland State	2003–04	4-25	(0-16)	--	Mike Garland
Cleveland State	2004–05	9-17	(6-10)	--	Mike Garland
Cleveland State	2005–06	10-18	(5-11)	--	Mike Garland
Cleveland State	2006–07	10-21	(3-13)	--	Gary Waters
Cleveland State	2007–08	21-13	(12-6)	NIT, First Round	Gary Waters
Cleveland State	2008–09	26-11	(12-6)	NCAA, Second Round	Gary Waters
Cleveland State	2009–10	16-17	(10-8)	--	Gary Waters
Cleveland State	2010–11	27-9	(13-5)	NIT, Second Round	Gary Waters
Cleveland State	2011–12	22-11	(12-6)	NIT, First Round	Gary Waters
Cleveland State	2012–13	14-18	(5-11)	--	Gary Waters
Cleveland State	2013–14	21–12	(12–4)	CIT, First Round	Gary Waters
Cleveland State	2014–15	19–15	(11–5)	CIT, Second Round	Gary Waters
Cleveland State	2015–16	9–23	(4–14)	--	Gary Waters
Cleveland State	2016–17	9–22	(5–13)	--	Gary Waters
Cleveland State	2017–18	12–23	(6-12)	--	Dennis Felton
Cleveland State	2018–19	10–21	(5–13)	--	Dennis Felton
Cleveland State	2019–20	11–21	(7–11)	--	Dennis Gates
Cleveland State	2020–21	19–8	(16-4)	NCAA, First Round	Dennis Gates
Cleveland State	2021–22	20–11	(15-6)	NIT, First Round	Dennis Gates
Cleveland State	2022–23	21–14	(14-6)	CBI, First Round	Daniyal Robinson
Cleveland State	2023–24	21–15	(11-9)	CBI, Quarterfinals	Daniyal Robinson
Cleveland State	2024–25	23–13	(14-6)	CBI Runner-up	Daniyal Robinson
Fenn College	34 years	167–386 (.302)	(0–0)	0 Postseason bids	
Cleveland State	60 years	847–892 (.487)	344–335 (.507)	12 Postseason bids	
Total	94 years	1014–1266 (.445)	344–335 (.507)	12 Postseason bids	

=== Conference tournaments ===
==== AMCU ====
Date	Seed	Location	Round	Result
March 9, 1984	7th	Springfield, Missouri	Quarterfinal	W 93-79 OT over (2) Northern Iowa
March 10, 1984		Springfield, Missouri	Semifinal	W 59-58 over (3) Southwest Missouri State
March 11, 1984		Springfield, Missouri	Final	L 73-64 to (5) Western Illinois
March 6, 1985	1st	Woodling Gym • Cleveland, Ohio	Quarterfinal	W 85-67 over (8) Wisconsin-Green Bay
March 8, 1985		Woodling Gym • Cleveland, Ohio	Semifinal	L 79-76 to (4) Southwest Missouri State
March 6, 1986	1st	Springfield, Missouri	Quarterfinal	W 73-68 over (8) Northern Iowa
March 7, 1986		Springfield, Missouri	Semifinal	W 100-84 over (5) Illinois-Chicago
March 8, 1986		Springfield, Missouri	Final	W 70-66 over (3) Eastern Illinois
March 5, 1987	2nd	Springfield, Missouri	Quarterfinal	W 60-53 over (7) Eastern Illinois
March 6, 1987		Springfield, Missouri	Semifinal	W 94-78 over (3) Illinois-Chicago
March 7, 1987		Springfield, Missouri	Final	L 90-87 to (1) Southwest Missouri State

- 1988, No tournament held
- 1989, Ineligible for tournament
- 1990, Ineligible for tournament

Date	Seed	Location	Round	Result
March 3, 1991	4th	Green Bay, Wisconsin	Quarterfinal	L 79-75 to (5) Northern Iowa
March 8, 1992	7th	CSU Convocation Center • Cleveland, Ohio	Quarterfinal	W 80-77 OT over (2) Akron
March 9, 1992		CSU Convocation Center • Cleveland, Ohio	Semifinal	L 83-59 to (3) Illinois-Chicago
March 7, 1993	1st	Dayton, Ohio	Quarterfinal	W 64-53 over (8) Western Illinois
March 8, 1993		Dayton, Ohio	Semifinal	L 96-68 to (4) Illinois-Chicago
March 6, 1994	4th	Rosemont, Illinois	Quarterfinal	W 70-67 over (5) Wright State
March 7, 1994		Rosemont, Illinois	Semifinal	L 93-63 to (1) Wisconsin-Green Bay

==== Horizon League ====
Date	Seed	Location	Round	Result
March 3, 1995	9th	Dayton, Ohio	First	L 88-81 to (8) Wright State

- 1996, Did not qualify as 9th overall in the conference.

Date	Seed	Location	Round	Result
March 1, 1997	7th	Dayton, Ohio	Quarterfinal	W 67-63 over (2) Detroit
March 2, 1997		Dayton, Ohio	Semifinal	L 76-42 to (3) Illinois-Chicago
February 28, 1998	5th	Brown County Veterans Memorial Arena • Green Bay, Wisconsin	Quarterfinal	L 82-53 to (4) Wisconsin-Green Bay
February 27, 1999	5th	Chicago, Illinois	Quarterfinal	W 65-59 over (4) Loyola-Chicago
February 28, 1999		Chicago, Illinois	Semifinal	L 80-65 to (1) Detroit
March 4, 2000	2nd	Chicago, Illinois	Quarterfinal	L 70-54 to (7) Illinois-Chicago
March 3, 2001	3rd	Dayton, Ohio	Quarterfinal	W 62-61 over (7) Illinois-Chicago
March 4, 2001		Dayton, Ohio	Semifinal	L 91-81 to (2) Detroit
March 2, 2002	7th	CSU Convocation Center • Cleveland, Ohio	Quarterfinal	L 67-63 to (2) Detroit
March 4, 2003	9th	Joseph J. Gentile Arena • Chicago, Illinois	First	L 69-57 to (4) Loyola-Chicago
March 2, 2004	9th	Calihan Hall • Detroit, Michigan	First	L 62-36 to (4) Detroit
March 1, 2005	8th	UIC Pavilion • Chicago, Illinois	First	L 84-65 to (5) Illinois-Chicago
February 28, 2006	8th	Calihan Hall • Detroit, Michigan	First	L 92-58 to (5) Detroit
February 27, 2007	9th	Resch Center • Green Bay, Wisconsin	First	L 78-59 to (4) Wisconsin-Green Bay
March 8, 2008	2nd	Hinkle Fieldhouse • Indianapolis, Indiana	Semifinal	W 78-73 over (6) Valparaiso
March 11, 2008		Hinkle Fieldhouse • Indianapolis, Indiana	Final	L 70-55 to (1) Butler
March 3, 2009	3rd	Wolstein Center • Cleveland, Ohio	First	W 56-43 over (10) Detroit
March 6, 2009		Hinkle Fieldhouse • Indianapolis, Indiana	Second	W 67-64 over (7) Illinois-Chicago
March 7, 2009		Hinkle Fieldhouse • Indianapolis, Indiana	Semifinal	W 73-67 over (2) Wisconsin-Green Bay
March 10, 2009		Hinkle Fieldhouse • Indianapolis, Indiana	Final	W 57-54 over (1) Butler
March 2, 2010	5th	Wolstein Center • Cleveland, Ohio	First	W 80-66 over (8) Loyola-Illinois
March 5, 2010		Hinkle Fieldhouse • Indianapolis, Indiana	Second	L 82-75 to (4) Wisconsin-Milwaukee
March 1, 2011	3rd	Wolstein Center • Cleveland, Ohio	First	W 73-61 over (10) Illinois-Chicago
March 4, 2011		U.S. Cellular Arena • Milwaukee, Wisconsin	Second	W 73-59 over (6) Wright State
March 5, 2011		U.S. Cellular Arena • Milwaukee, Wisconsin	Semifinal	L 76-68 to (2) Butler
March 3, 2012	2nd	Athletics–Recreation Center • Valparaiso, Indiana	Semifinal	L 63-58 to (3) Detroit
March 5, 2013	8th	UIC Pavilion • Chicago, Illinois	First	L 82-59 to (5) Illinois-Chicago
March 8, 2014	2nd	Resch Center • Green Bay, Wisconsin	Semifinal	L 68-63 to (3) Wright State
March 6, 2015	4th	Athletics–Recreation Center • Valparaiso, Indiana	Second	W 70-53 over (5) Detroit
March 7, 2015		Athletics–Recreation Center • Valparaiso, Indiana	Semifinal	L 60-55 to (1) Valparaiso
March 5, 2016	9th	Joe Louis Arena • Detroit, Michigan	First	L 65-53 to (4) Wisconsin-Green Bay
March 3, 2017	8th	Joe Louis Arena • Detroit, Michigan	First	L 84-69 to (9) Youngstown State
March 2, 2018	8th	Little Caesars Arena • Detroit, Michigan	First	W 72-71 over (9) Youngstown State
March 3, 2018	8th	Little Caesars Arena • Detroit, Michigan	Quarterfinals	W 89-80 over (1) Northern Kentucky
March 5, 2018	8th	Little Caesars Arena • Detroit, Michigan	Semifinals	W 44-43 over (4) Oakland
March 6, 2018	8th	Little Caesars Arena • Detroit, Michigan	Final	L 74-57 to (2) Wright State

- 2019, Did not qualify as 9th overall in the conference.

Date	Seed	Location	Round	Result
March 3, 2020	7th	O'rena • Rochester, Michigan	First	L 80-59 to (6) Oakland
March 2, 2021	1st	Wolstein Center • Cleveland, Ohio	Quarterfinals	W 108-104 (3OT) to (10) Purdue Fort Wayne
March 8, 2021	1st	Indiana Farmers Coliseum • Indianapolis, Indiana	Semifinals	W 71-65 to (8) Milwaukee
March 9, 2021	1st	Indiana Farmers Coliseum • Indianapolis, Indiana	Final	W 80-69 to (3) Oakland
March 3, 2022	1st	Wolstein Center • Cleveland, Ohio	Quarterfinal	W 83-67 to (10) Robert Morris
March 7, 2022	1st	Indiana Farmers Coliseum • Indianapolis, Indiana	Semifinal	L 82-67 to (4) Wright State

== Postseason history ==
=== NCAA Division I Tournament history ===
Cleveland State has made three appearances in the NCAA Division I men's basketball tournament, having a record of 3–3.

Year	Seed	Round	Opponent	Result
1986	#14	First Round; Second Round; Sweet Sixteen	#3 Indiana #6 Saint Joseph's #7 Navy	W 83–79; W 75–69; L 70–71
2009	#13	First Round; Second Round	#4 Wake Forest #12 Arizona	W 84–69; L 57–71
2021	#15	First Round	#2 Houston	L 56–87

=== NIT results ===
Cleveland State has appeared in the National Invitation Tournament six times, with the Vikings having a record of 3–6.

Year	Seed	Round	Opponent	Result
1987	N/A	First Round; Second Round	Tennessee-Chattanooga; Illinois State	W 92–73; L 77–79
1988	N/A	First Round; Second Round	Illinois State; Ohio State	W 89–83^{OT} L 80–86
2008	#6	First Round	#3 Dayton	L 57–66
2011	#2	First Round; Second Round	#7 Vermont #6 College of Charleston	W 63–60; L 56–64
2012	#6	First Round	#3 Stanford	L 65–76
2022	--	First Round	#2 Xavier	L 68–72

=== CBI results ===
The Vikings have received three College Basketball Invitational (CBI) berths. Their combined record is 3–3.

Year	Round	Opponent	Result
2023	First Round	Eastern Kentucky	L 75–91^{OT}
2024	First Round; Quarterfinals	Northern Colorado; High Point	W 59–41; L 74–93
2025	Quarterfinals; Semifinals; Championship	Queens (NC); Florida Gulf Coast; Illinois State	W 88–73; W 72–65; L 68–79

=== CIT results ===
Cleveland State has appeared in the CollegeInsider.com Postseason Tournament twice, having a combined record of 1–2.

Year	Round	Opponent	Result
2014	First Round	Ohio	L 62–64
2015	First Round; Second Round	Western Michigan; NJIT	W 86–57; L 77–80

== Retired numbers ==
Cleveland State has retired four numbers in program history.

Cleveland State Vikings retired numbers
No.	Player	Career	No. ret.	Ref.
10	Ken McFadden	1985–1989	1989	
14	Franklin Edwards	1977–1981	1981	
30	Norris Cole	2007–2011	2016	
44	Clinton Ransey	1983–1987	2022	

== Head coaching history ==
No.	Coach	Tenure	Record	Pct.
1	Homer E. Woodling	1929–1941	63–112	.360
2	Bruce T. Brickley	1941–1942	2–12	.143
3	Aaron L. Andrews	1942–1943	0–13	.000
4	George McKinnon	1945–1949	20–40	.333
5	George Rung	1949–1952	19–31	.380
6	Homer E. Woodling	1952–1953	2–15	.118
7	George Rung	1953–1958	15–76	.165
8	Bill Gallagher	1958–1959	7–12	.368
9	Jim Rodriguez	1959–1966	43–88	.328
10	John McLendon	1966–1969	27–42	.391
11	Ray Dieringer	1969–1983	150–210	.417
12	Kevin Mackey	1983–1990	142–69	.673
13	Mike Boyd	1990–1996	79–88	.473
14	Rollie Massimino	1996–2003	90–113	.443
15	Mike Garland	2003–2006	23–60	.277
16	Gary Waters	2006–2017	194–172	.530
17	Dennis Felton	2017–2019	22–44	.333
18	Dennis Gates	2019–2022	50–40	.556
19	Daniyal Robinson	2022–2025	65–42	.607
20	Rob Summers	2025–present	0–0	–

=== Championships ===
Cleveland State has won six regular season championships (1985, 1986, 1993, 2011, 2021, 2022) and three conference tournaments (1986, 2009, 2021).

Year	Conference	Distinction	Record
1985	Mid-Continent Conference	Regular season	21–8 (11–3)
1986	Mid-Continent Conference	Regular season Conference tournament	29–4(13–1)
1993	Mid-Continent Conference	Regular season	22–6 (15–1)
2009	Horizon League	Conference tournament	26–11 (12–6)
2011	Horizon League	Regular season	27–9 (13–5)
2021	Horizon League	Regular season Conference tournament	19–8 (16–4)
2022	Horizon League	Regular season	20–11 (15–6)

=== Alumni in the National Basketball Association ===
Nine Cleveland State alumni have played in the NBA, including:

- Norris Cole
- Franklin Edwards
- Bryn Forbes
- Cedric Jackson
- Jim Les
- Clinton Smith
- Darren Tillis
- D’Moi Hodge
- Tristan Enaruna

=== Media ===
The flagship station for CSU men's basketball is WARF 1350 AM, with announcer Al Pawlowski. Any CSU games WARF can't air due to conflicts slide over to sister station WTAM 1100 AM/106.9 FM.
