= 2007 Horizon League men's basketball tournament =

2007 basketball tournament

- Classification: Division I
- Season: 2006–07
- Teams: 9
- First round site: campus sites
- Quarterfinals site: Nutter Center; Fairborn, Ohio
- Semifinals site: Nutter Center; Fairborn, Ohio
- Finals site: Nutter Center; Fairborn, Ohio
- Champions: Wright State (1st title)
- Winning coach: Brad Brownell (1st title)

The 2007 Horizon League Men's Basketball Tournament was the final event of the 2006–07 men's basketball season for the Horizon League. Wright State won the tournament, defeating Butler in the championship game, to receive the conference's automatic berth into the NCAA Tournament.

== Bracket ==
First Round; Tuesday, February 27
4	UW-Green Bay	78
9	Cleveland State	59
5	Youngstown State	82
8	Detroit	80
6	UIC	83
7	Milwaukee	77

Second Round; Friday, March 2
4	UW-Green Bay	72
5	Youngstown State	55
3	Loyola (Chicago)	66
6	UIC	62

Semifinals; Saturday, March 3
1	Wright State	57
4	UW-Green Bay	51
2	#18 Butler	67
3	Loyola (Chicago)	66

Final; Tuesday, March 6
1	Wright State	60
2	#19 Butler	55

First round games at campus sites of higher seeds
Second round, semifinals, and final at Nutter Center, Fairborn, OH
