= 2021–22 Horizon League men's basketball season =

- League: NCAA Division I
- Sport: Men's basketball
- Number of teams: 12
- TV partner(s): ESPN+ ESPN2; ESPNU; ESPN

Regular season
- Season champions: Cleveland State & Purdue Fort Wayne

Tournament
- Champions: Wright State
- Runners-up: Northern Kentucky
- Finals MVP: Grant Basile

Basketball seasons
- ← 2020–21 2022–23 →

2021–22 Horizon League men's basketball standings
	Conf.				Overall
Team	W		L	PCT	W		L	PCT
Cleveland State	15	–	6	.714	20	–	11	.645
Purdue Fort Wayne	15	–	6	.714	21	–	12	.636
Northern Kentucky	14	–	6	.700	20	–	12	.625
Wright State †	15	–	7	.682	22	–	14	.611
Oakland	12	–	7	.632	20	–	12	.625
Detroit Mercy	10	–	7	.588	14	–	15	.483
Youngstown State	12	–	9	.571	19	–	15	.559
UIC	9	–	10	.474	14	–	16	.467
Milwaukee	8	–	14	.364	10	–	22	.313
Robert Morris	5	–	16	.238	8	–	23	.258
Green Bay	4	–	16	.200	5	–	25	.167
IUPUI	1	–	16	.059	3	–	26	.103
† 2022 Horizon League tournament winner

The 2021–22 Horizon League men's basketball season began with practices in September 2021 and ended with the 2022 Horizon League men's basketball tournament in March 2022. This was the 42nd season for Horizon League men's basketball.

== Head coaches ==
=== Coaching changes ===
- On April 13, 2021, IUPUI announced Ball State assistant Matt Crenshaw as the team's new head coach. Previous head coach Byron Rimm II served as the team's head coach for two years while the program's search for a permanent head coach was prolonged by the COVID-19 pandemic.

== Preseason ==
=== Preseason coaches poll ===
2021-22 Horizon League Preseason Coaches Poll
Rank	Team (First Place Votes)	Points
1.	Cleveland State (30)	502
2.	Wright State (9)	463
3.	Northern Kentucky (1)	406
4.	Milwaukee (2)	396
5.	Detroit Mercy (2)	350
6.	Oakland	340
7.	Youngstown State	214
8.	UIC	204
8.	Purdue Fort Wayne	169
10.	Robert Morris	157
11.	Green Bay	146
12.	IUPUI	85

=== Preseason All-Horizon League ===
First team	Second team
Torrey Patton, Cleveland State	DeAndre Gholston, Milwaukee
Antoine Davis, Detroit Mercy	Trevon Faulkner, Northern Kentucky
Patrick Baldwin Jr., Milwaukee	Marques Warrick, Northern Kentucky
Jalen Moore, Oakland	Jarred Godfrey, Purdue Fort Wayne
Grant Basile, Wright State	Tanner Holden, Wright State

Preseason Player of the Year: Antoine Davis, Detroit Mercy

=== Preseason watchlists ===
Below is a table of notable preseason watch lists.

	Wooden	Robertson	Cousy	West	Erving	Malone	Abdul-Jabbar	Henson
Patrick Baldwin Jr., Milwaukee	✓				✓			✓
Antoine Davis, Detroit Mercy								✓
Tanner Holden, Wright State								✓
Jalen Moore, Oakland								✓

== Rankings ==
Legend
	Improvement in ranking
	Drop in ranking
	Not ranked previous week
RV	Received votes but were not ranked in Top 25 of poll
(Italics)	Number of first place votes

		Pre/ Wk 1	Wk 2	Wk 3	Wk 4	Wk 5	Wk 6	Wk 7	Wk 8	Wk 9	Wk 10	Wk 11	Wk 12	Wk 13	Wk 14	Wk 15	Wk 16	Wk 17	Wk 18	Final
Cleveland State	AP																			
Cleveland State	C																			
Detroit Mercy	AP																			
Detroit Mercy	C																			
Green Bay	AP																			
Green Bay	C																			
IUPUI	AP																			
IUPUI	C																			
Milwaukee	AP																			
Milwaukee	C																			
Northern Kentucky	AP																			
Northern Kentucky	C																			
Oakland	AP																			
Oakland	C											RV								
Purdue Fort Wayne	AP																			
Purdue Fort Wayne	C																			
Robert Morris	AP																			
Robert Morris	C																			
UIC	AP																			
UIC	C																			
Wright State	AP																			
Wright State	C																			
Youngstown State	AP																			
Youngstown State	C																			

== Regular season ==
=== Player of the Week awards ===
Week	Player of the Week	Freshman of the Week
1	Grant Basile, Wright State	Patrick Baldwin Jr., Milwaukee
2	Jamal Cain, Oakland	Sam Vinson, Northern Kentucky
3	Jamal Cain (2), Oakland	Sam Vinson (2), Northern Kentucky
4	Antoine Davis, Detroit Mercy	Patrick Baldwin Jr. (2), Milwaukee
5	Marques Warrick, Northern Kentucky; Dwayne Cohill, Youngstown State	Sam Vinson (3), Northern Kentucky
6	D'Moi Hodge, Cleveland State	Hubie Pivorius, Northern Kentucky
7	Grant Basile (2), Wright State	AJ Braun, Wright State
8	Jamal Cain (3), Oakland	Sam Vinson (4), Northern Kentucky
9	Antoine Davis (2), Detroit Mercy	Kamari McGee, Green Bay
10	Kevin Johnson, UIC	Kamari McGee (2), Green Bay
11	Tanner Holden, Wright State	Sam Vinson (5), Northern Kentucky
12	Michael Akuchie, Youngstown State	Sam Vinson (6), Northern Kentucky
13	Grant Basile (3), Wright State	Cade Meyer, Green Bay
14	Jamal Cain (4), Oakland	Sam Vinson (7), Northern Kentucky
15	Antoine Davis (3), Detroit Mercy	Jace Carter, UIC
16	Marques Warrick (2), Northern Kentucky	Kamari McGee (3), Green Bay

School	POTW	FOTW
Cleveland State	1	0
Detroit Mercy	3	0
Green Bay	0	4
IUPUI	0	0
Milwaukee	0	2
Northern Kentucky	2	8
Oakland	4	0
Purdue Fort Wayne	0	0
Robert Morris	0	0
UIC	1	1
Wright State	4	1
Youngstown State	2	0

=== Conference matrix ===
	CSU	DET	GB	IUPUI	MKE	NKU	OAK	PFW	RMU	UIC	WSU	YSU
vs. Cleveland State	–	1–1	0–2	0–1	0–2	1–1	2–0	1–2	0–2	1–0	0–2	0–2
vs. Detroit Mercy	1–1	–	1–0	0–1	0–2	0–2	1–0	2–0	0–1	0–2	1–1	1–0
vs. Green Bay	2–0	0–1	–	0–2	2–0	2–0	1–0	2–0	1–1	2–0	2–0	2–0
vs. IUPUI	1–0	1–0	2–0	–	2–0	1–0	1–0	1–0	1–1	2–0	2–0	2–0
vs. Milwaukee	2–0	2–0	0–2	0–2	–	1–1	1–1	2–0	1–1	2–0	1–1	2–0
vs. Northern Kentucky	1–1	2–0	0–2	0–1	1–1	–	0–2	1–1	1–1	0–1	0–2	0–2
vs. Oakland	0–2	0–1	0–1	0–1	1–1	2–0	–	1–1	0–2	0–2	2–0	1–1
vs. Purdue Fort Wayne	2–1	0–2	0–2	0–1	0–2	1–1	1–1	–	0–2	0–1	2–0	0–2
vs. Robert Morris	2–0	1–0	1–1	1–1	1–1	1–1	2–0	2–0	–	2–0	2–0	1–1
vs. UIC	0–1	2–0	0–2	0–2	0–2	1–0	2–0	1–0	0–2	–	2–0	2–0
vs. Wright State	2–0	1–1	0–2	0–2	1–1	2–0	0–2	0–2	0–2	0–2	–	1–1
vs. Youngstown State	2–0	0–1	0–2	0–2	0–2	2–0	1–1	2–0	1–1	0–2	1–1	–
Total	15–6	15–6	4–16	1–16	8–14	14–6	12–7	15–6	5–16	9–10	15–7	12–9

=== Early season tournaments ===
The following table summarizes the multiple-team events (MTE) or early season tournaments in which teams from the Horizon League participated.

Team	Tournament	Location	Dates
Cleveland State	Lake Erie Challenge	Cleveland, OH; Buffalo, NY	November 20–24
Detroit Mercy	Bahamas Championship	Campus sites	November 17–27
Green Bay	Jersey Mike's Classic	St. Petersburg, FL	November 18–21
IUPUI	Roadrunner Invitational	San Antonio, TX	November 15–21
Milwaukee	Fort Myers Tip-Off	Campus sites Fort Myers, FL	November 14–24
Northern Kentucky	Blue Demon Classic	Campus sites	November 18–28
Oakland	Gulf Coast Showcase	Estero, FL	November 22–24
Purdue Fort Wayne	FGCU Invitational	Fort Myers, FL	November 26–28
Robert Morris	Kentucky Classic	Campus sites	November 12–22
UIC	Las Vegas Classic	Las Vegas, NV	November 25–26
Wright State	Naples Invitational	Naples, FL	November 22–24
Youngstown State	Penguin Classic	Youngstown, OH	November 19–21
