= 2021–22 UIC Flames men's basketball team =

American college basketball season

2021–22 UIC Flames men's basketball
- Conference: Horizon League
- Record: 14–16 (9–10 Horizon)
- Head coach: Luke Yaklich (2nd season)
- Assistant coaches: Dee Brown (5th season); Will Veasley (2nd season); Bill Wuczynski (1st season)
- Home arena: Credit Union 1 Arena

2021–22 Horizon League men's basketball standings
	Conf.				Overall
Team	W		L	PCT	W		L	PCT
Cleveland State	15	–	6	.714	20	–	11	.645
Purdue Fort Wayne	15	–	6	.714	21	–	12	.636
Northern Kentucky	14	–	6	.700	20	–	12	.625
Wright State †	15	–	7	.682	22	–	14	.611
Oakland	12	–	7	.632	20	–	12	.625
Detroit Mercy	10	–	7	.588	14	–	15	.483
Youngstown State	12	–	9	.571	19	–	15	.559
UIC	9	–	10	.474	14	–	16	.467
Milwaukee	8	–	14	.364	10	–	22	.313
Robert Morris	5	–	16	.238	8	–	23	.258
Green Bay	4	–	16	.200	5	–	25	.167
IUPUI	1	–	16	.059	3	–	26	.103
† 2022 Horizon League tournament winner

The 2021–22 UIC Flames men's basketball team represented the University of Illinois at Chicago in the 2021–22 NCAA Division I men's basketball season. The Flames, led by second-year head coach Luke Yaklich, played their home games at Credit Union 1 Arena in Chicago, Illinois as members of the Horizon League.

On January 26, 2022, UIC announced that this would be the last season for the team in the Horizon League as they would join the Missouri Valley Conference on July 1, 2022.

== Previous season ==
In a season limited due to the ongoing COVID-19 pandemic, the Flames finished the 2020–21 season 9–13, 6–10 in Horizon League play to finish in a tie for 10th place. As the No. 11 seed in the Horizon League tournament, they lost to Youngstown State in the first round.

== Offseason ==
=== Departures ===
Departures
Name	Pos.	Height	Weight	Year	Hometown	Notes
Brian Taylor	G	6'6"	205	Sophomore	Detroit, MI	Transferred to Central Michigan
Jacob Wiley	F	6'7	210	Senior	Houston, TX	Graduated
Teyvion Kirk	G	6'4	185	Senior	Joliet, IL	Graduated
Demetrius Calip II	G	6'4	165	Freshman	Woodland Hills, CA	
Rob Howard	F	6'8	230	Senior	Gary, IN	Graduated
Bralen Bridges	F	6'10	235	Junior	Atlanta, GA	Transferred to Georgia
Treavon Martin	F	6'8	210	Junior	Chicago, IL	
Deon Ejim	F	6'6	250	Sophomore	Toronto, Canada	

=== Incoming transfers ===
Transfers
Name	Pos.	Height	Weight	Year	Hometown	Previous school
Brandon Battle	F	6'8	220	Graduate Student	Warren, OH	Alabama State
Damaria Franklin	G	6'3	205	Senior	Chicago, IL	Tennessee Tech
Kevin Johnson	G	6'0	160	Graduate Student	Thibodaux, LA	Nicholls State
Marcus Larsson	F	6'11	230	Junior	Oslo, Norway	Incarnate Word
Jalen Warren	G	6'3	160	Graduate Student	Milton, Canada	Florida Gulf Coast

=== Recruiting class ===
College recruiting information
Name	Hometown	School	Height	Weight	Commit date
Jaden Bronwell; PF	Sandy, UT	Alta High School	6 ft 9 in (2.06 m)	205 lb (93 kg)	Nov 18, 2020
Jaden Bronwell; PF	Recruit ratings: Scout: Rivals: 247Sports: (NR)				
Jace Carter; SG	Titusville, FL	Astronaut High School	6 ft 5 in (1.96 m)	215 lb (98 kg)	Sep 4, 2020
Jace Carter; SG	Recruit ratings: Rivals: 247Sports: (NR)				
Filip Skobalj; PF	Belgrade, Serbia	Don-Bosco-Schule Rostock	6 ft 7 in (2.01 m)	240 lb (110 kg)	Nov 20, 2020
Filip Skobalj; PF	Recruit ratings: Scout: Rivals: (NR)				
Overall recruit ranking:
Note: In many cases, Scout, Rivals, 247Sports, On3, and ESPN may conflict in their listings of height and weight.; In these cases, the average was taken. ESPN grades are on a 100-point scale.; Sources: "2021 Team Ranking". Rivals.

== Roster ==
2021–22 UIC Flames men's basketball team
Players
Coaches

Pos.	#	Name	Height	Weight	Year	Hometown
G	0	Jace Carter	6 ft 5 in (1.96 m)	215 lb (98 kg)	Fr	Titusville, FL
G	1	Maurice Commander	6 ft 0 in (1.83 m)	175 lb (79 kg)	Sr	Chicago, IL
F	2	Michael Diggins	6 ft 8 in (2.03 m)	195 lb (88 kg)	GS	Las Vegas, NV
G	3	Damaria Franklin	6 ft 3 in (1.91 m)	205 lb (93 kg)	Sr	Chicago, IL
G	4	Brandon Battle	6 ft 8 in (2.03 m)	220 lb (100 kg)	GS	Warren, OH
G	5	Jalen Warren	6 ft 3 in (1.91 m)	160 lb (73 kg)	GS	Milton, Canada
G	10	Jalen Johnson	6 ft 1 in (1.85 m)	180 lb (82 kg)	RS Sr	Hopkinsville, KY
G	13	Kevin Johnson	6 ft 0 in (1.83 m)	160 lb (73 kg)	GS	Thibodaux, LA
G	14	Brad Bowditch (W)	6 ft 0 in (1.83 m)	180 lb (82 kg)	So	Milton, WI
G	15	Griffin Yaklich (W)	6 ft 6 in (1.98 m)	200 lb (91 kg)	So	Joliet, IL
G	20	Jamie Ahale	6 ft 5 in (1.96 m)	205 lb (93 kg)	GS	Montrose, Australia
F	22	Marcus Lawson (injured)	6 ft 11 in (2.11 m)	230 lb (104 kg)	RS Jr	Oslo, Norway
F	23	Zion Griffin	6 ft 6 in (1.98 m)	215 lb (98 kg)	Sr	Darien, IL
F	33	Jaden Bronwell	6 ft 9 in (2.06 m)	205 lb (93 kg)	Fr	Sandy, UT
F	50	Filip Skobalj	6 ft 7 in (2.01 m)	240 lb (109 kg)	Fr	Belgrade, Serbia

Head coach

- Luke Yaklich (Illinois State)

Assistant coach(es)

- Dee Brown (Illinois)
- Will Veasley (Butler)
- Bill Wuczynski (UNLV)

Legend

- (C) Team captain
- (S) Suspended
- (I) Ineligible
- (W) Walk-on
- Injured
- Current redshirt

Roster
Last update: November 9, 2021

== Schedule and results ==
Date time, TV	Rank^{#}	Opponent^{#}	Result	Record	High points	High rebounds	High assists	Site (attendance) city, state
Exhibition
November 4, 2021*; 7:00 pm		Illinois Tech	W 76–59	–	18 – K. Johnson	13 – Diggins	7 – Griffin	Credit Union 1 Arena (656); Chicago, IL
Regular season
November 9, 2021*; 6:00 pm, ESPN+		at Dayton	L 54–64	0–1	17 – Griffin	6 – Carter	7 – K. Johnson	UD Arena (13,407); Dayton, OH
November 13, 2021*; 12:00 pm, ESPN3		at Valparaiso	W 74–70 ^{OT}	1–1	23 – Franklin	11 – Franklin	9 – K. Johnson	Athletics–Recreation Center (2,622); Valparaiso, IN
November 16, 2021*; 7:00 pm, ESPN+		Trinity Christian	W 91–50	2–1	15 – Warren	8 – Batlle	8 – Tied	Credit Union 1 Arena (1,697); Chicago, IL
November 20, 2021*; 3:00 pm, NBCSCHI		at Loyola–Chicago	L 63–80	2–2	22 – Franklin	12 – Franklin	5 – K. Johnson	Joseph J. Gentile Arena (3,732); Chicago, IL
November 25, 2021*; 3:00 pm		vs. Hawaiʻi; Continental Tires Las Vegas Classic	L 80–88	2–3	22 – Franklin	6 – Tied	7 – K. Johnson	Orleans Arena; Paradise, NV
November 26, 2021*; 2:30 pm		vs. San Diego; Continental Tires Las Vegas Classic	L 52–64	2–4	12 – Franklin	7 – Franklin	4 – K. Johnson	Orleans Arena; Paradise, NV
December 2, 2021; 7:00 pm, ESPN+		Oakland	L 77–81	2–5 (0–1)	24 – Griffin	9 – Griffin	7 – K. Johnson	Credit Union 1 Arena (1,724); Chicago, IL
December 5, 2021; 1:00 pm, ESPN+		Detroit Mercy	L 56–64	2–6 (0–2)	18 – Franklin	14 – Franklin	6 – K. Johnson	Credit Union 1 Arena (2,111); Chicago, IL
December 11, 2021*; 6:00 pm, ESPN3		at Central Michigan	W 71–67	3–6	14 – K. Johnson	7 – Diggins	4 – K. Johnson	McGuirk Arena (1,334); Mount Pleasant, MI
December 14, 2021*; 7:00 pm, ESPN+		DePaul	L 66–72	3–7	24 – Franklin	12 – Franklin	8 – Warren	Credit Union 1 Arena (2,789); Chicago, IL
December 19, 2021*; 1:00 pm, ESPN+		Northern Illinois	W 61-60	4-7	17 – Franklin	8 – Griffin	6 – K. Johnson	Credit Union 1 Arena (2,148); Chicago, IL
December 30, 2021; 7:00 pm, ESPN+		Purdue Fort Wayne	Canceled due to COVID-19 issues at UIC					Credit Union 1 Arena; Chicago, IL
January 1, 2022; 3:12 pm, ESPN+		Cleveland State	Canceled due to COVID-19 issues at UIC					Credit Union 1 Arena; Chicago, IL
January 6, 2022; 6:00 pm, ESPN+		at Wright State	L 72–90	4–8 (0–3)	19 – K. Johnson	6 – Skobaji	3 – Tied	Nutter Center; Dayton, OH
January 8, 2022; 1:00 pm, ESPN+		at Northern Kentucky	Canceled due to COVID-19 issues at Northern Kentucky					BB&T Arena; Highland Heights, KY
January 10, 2022; 6:00 pm, ESPN+		at IUPUI	W 67–65	5–8 (1–3)	17 – K. Johnson	8 – Skobalj	6 – K. Johnson	Indiana Farmers Coliseum (613); Indianapolis, IN
January 13, 2022; 7:00 pm, ESPN+		at Milwaukee	W 81–77	6–8 (2–3)	28 – K. Johnson	6 – Warren	5 – Warren	UW–Milwaukee Panther Arena (1,790); Milwaukee, WI
January 15, 2022; 6:00 pm, ESPN+		at Green Bay	W 80–63	7–8 (3–3)	19 – Franklin	9 – Carter	2 – Tied	Kress Events Center (1,721); Green Bay, WI
January 20, 2022; 6:00 pm, ESPN+		Northern Kentucky	L 70–74 ^{OT}	7–9 (3–4)	17 – Franklin	11 – Skobalj	6 – Franklin	Credit Union 1 Arena (2,024); Chicago, IL
January 22, 2022; 7:00 pm, ESPN+		Wright State	L 81–97	7–10 (3–5)	25 – Franklin	8 – Carter	4 – Warren	Credit Union 1 Arena (1,819); Chicago, IL
January 27, 2022; 7:00 pm, ESPN+		at Detroit Mercy	L 67–80	7–11 (3–6)	17 – Franklin	5 – Tied	7 – K. Johnson	Calihan Hall (1,795); Detroit, MI
January 29, 2022; 7:00 pm, ESPN+		at Oakland	L 74–81	7–12 (3–7)	25 – Franklin	7 – Diggins	6 – Tied	Athletics Center O'rena (2,966); Auburn Hills, MI
February 3, 2022; 7:00 pm, ESPN+		Robert Morris	W 80–75	8–12 (4–7)	18 – K. Johnson	8 – Franklin	4 – Tied	Credit Union 1 Arena (1,725); Chicago, IL
February 5, 2022; 1:00 pm, ESPN+		Youngstown State	L 64–66	8–13 (4–8)	23 – Franklin	6 – Tied	5 – K. Johnson	Credit Union 1 Arena (2,314); Chicago, IL
February 10, 2022; 6:00 pm, ESPN+		at Cleveland State	W 76–75	9–13 (5–8)	19 – Franklin	10 – Diggins	4 – Diggins	Wolstein Center (2,175); Cleveland, OH
February 12, 2022; 6:00 pm, ESPN+		at Purdue Fort Wayne	L 66–73	9–14 (5–9)	17 – Franklin	8 – Franklin	6 – Johnson	Hilliard Gates Sports Center (1,370); Fort Wayne, IN
February 14, 2022; 7:00 pm, ESPN+		IUPUI	W 57–54	10–14 (6–9)	12 – Carter	6 – Carter	5 – Warren	Credit Union 1 Arena (1,242); Chicago, IL
February 17, 2022; 6:00 pm, ESPN+		at Youngstown State	L 79–88	10–15 (6–10)	23 – Franklin	9 – Franklin	8 – Warren	Beeghly Center (1,823); Youngstown, OH
February 19, 2022; 6:00 pm, ESPN+		at Robert Morris	W 96–88 ^{OT}	11–15 (7–10)	28 – Franklin	10 – Griffin	5 – Skobalj	UPMC Events Center (1,601); Moon, PA
February 24, 2022; 7:00 pm, ESPN+		Green Bay	W 81–77	12–15 (8–10)	21 – Griffin	8 – Franklin	5 – Johnson	Credit Union 1 Arena (3,257); Chicago, IL
February 26, 2022; 7:00 pm, ESPN+		Milwaukee	W 71–58	13–15 (9–10)	16 – Diggins	10 – Carter	5 – Johnson	Credit Union 1 Arena (3,165); Chicago, IL
Horizon League tournament
March 1, 2022; 6:00 pm, ESPN+	(8)	(9) Milwaukee; First Round	W 80–69	14–15	21 – K. Johnson	8 – Carter	4 – Warren	UW–Milwaukee Panther Arena; Milwaukee, WI
March 3, 2022; 6:00 pm, ESPN+	(8)	at (2) Purdue Fort Wayne; Quarterfinals	L 72–78	14–16	16 – Carter	9 – Carter	4 – Johnson	Hilliard Gates Sports Center (2,135); Fort Wayne, IN
*Non-conference game. ^{#}Rankings from AP Poll. (#) Tournament seedings in parentheses. All times are in Central Time Zone.
