= 2021–22 Cleveland State Vikings men's basketball team =

American college basketball season

2021–22 Cleveland State Vikings men's basketball

Horizon League co-regular season champions

NIT, first round
- Conference: Horizon League
- Record: 20–11 (15–6 Horizon)
- Head coach: Dennis Gates (3rd season)
- Assistant coaches: Rob Summers; Dru Joyce III; Ryan Sharbaugh
- Home arena: Wolstein Center

2021–22 Horizon League men's basketball standings
	Conf.				Overall
Team	W		L	PCT	W		L	PCT
Cleveland State	15	–	6	.714	20	–	11	.645
Purdue Fort Wayne	15	–	6	.714	21	–	12	.636
Northern Kentucky	14	–	6	.700	20	–	12	.625
Wright State †	15	–	7	.682	22	–	14	.611
Oakland	12	–	7	.632	20	–	12	.625
Detroit Mercy	10	–	7	.588	14	–	15	.483
Youngstown State	12	–	9	.571	19	–	15	.559
UIC	9	–	10	.474	14	–	16	.467
Milwaukee	8	–	14	.364	10	–	22	.313
Robert Morris	5	–	16	.238	8	–	23	.258
Green Bay	4	–	16	.200	5	–	25	.167
IUPUI	1	–	16	.059	3	–	26	.103
† 2022 Horizon League tournament winner

The 2021–22 Cleveland State Vikings men's basketball team represented Cleveland State University in the 2021–22 NCAA Division I men's basketball season. The Vikings, led by third-year head coach Dennis Gates, played their home games at the Wolstein Center in Cleveland, Ohio as members of the Horizon League. They finished the season 20–11, 15–6 in Horizon League play to earn a share of the regular season championship for the second consecutive year. As the No. 1 seed in the Horizon League tournament, they defeated Robert Morris in the quarterfinals before losing to Wright State in the semifinals. As a regular season champion that did not win their conference tournament, they received an automatic bid to the National Invitation Tournament. They lost in the first round of the NIT to Xavier.

== Previous season ==
In a season limited due to the ongoing COVID-19 pandemic, the Vikings finished the 2020–21 season 19–8, 16–4 in Horizon League play to finish as Horizon League regular season co-champions. As the No. 1 seed in the Horizon League tournament, they defeated Purdue Fort Wayne, Milwaukee, and Oakland to win the tournament championship. As a result, they received the conference's automatic bid to the NCAA tournament, their first appearance since 2009 and the school's third bid to the tournament. As the No. 15 seed in the Midwest Region, they lost to Houston in the first round.

== Roster ==
2021–22 Cleveland State Vikings men's basketball team
Players
Coaches

Pos.	#	Name	Height	Weight	Year	Hometown
G	0	Nathanael Jack	6 ft 5 in (1.96 m)	195 lb (88 kg)	Sr	Mississauga, Ontario
G	1	Demetrius Terry	6 ft 0 in (1.83 m)	175 lb (79 kg)	So	Cleveland, Ohio
G	2	Yahel Hill	6 ft 0 in (1.83 m)	170 lb (77 kg)	Sr	Cleveland, Ohio
G	3	Craig Beaudion	6 ft 3 in (1.91 m)	170 lb (77 kg)	So	Chicago, Illinois
F	4	Cole Middleton	6 ft 6 in (1.98 m)	220 lb (100 kg)	Fr	Atlanta, Georgia
G	5	Tre Gomillion	6 ft 4 in (1.93 m)	215 lb (98 kg)	Sr	Augusta, Georgia
F	11	Jayson Woodrich	6 ft 7 in (2.01 m)	195 lb (88 kg)	So	Beachwood, Ohio
F	12	Algevon Eichelberger	6 ft 8 in (2.03 m)	250 lb (113 kg)	Sr	Saginaw, Michigan
F	13	Chris Greene	6 ft 8 in (2.03 m)	210 lb (95 kg)	Sr	Newport News, Virginia
F	15	Anderson Mirambeaux	6 ft 8 in (2.03 m)	305 lb (138 kg)	Jr	Santo Domingo, Dominican Republic
G	20	Aria Eskandari	6 ft 3 in (1.91 m)	190 lb (86 kg)	Sr	Sanford, Florida
G	21	Jeremy Sanchez	6 ft 0 in (1.83 m)	170 lb (77 kg)	Jr	North Ridgeville, Ohio
G	22	Deshon Parker	6 ft 4 in (1.93 m)	195 lb (88 kg)	Sr	Huber Heights, Ohio
G	23	Broc Finstuen	6 ft 4 in (1.93 m)	200 lb (91 kg)	Sr	Pine Island, Minnesota
G	24	Torrey Patton	6 ft 5 in (1.96 m)	195 lb (88 kg)	Sr	Dayton, Ohio
G	31	Ben Sternberg	6 ft 0 in (1.83 m)	152 lb (69 kg)	Sr	Cleveland, Ohio
F	35	Deante Johnson	6 ft 9 in (2.06 m)	210 lb (95 kg)	Sr	Detroit, Michigan
C	50	Mabor Majak	7 ft 2 in (2.18 m)	230 lb (104 kg)	So	Biemnon, South Sudan
G	55	D'Moi Hodge	6 ft 4 in (1.93 m)	180 lb (82 kg)	Sr	Tortola, British Virgin Islands

Head coach

- Dennis Gates (California)

Assistant coach(es)

- Rob Summers (West Virginia)
- Dru Joyce III (Akron)
- Ryan Sharbaugh (Westminster)

Legend

- (C) Team captain
- (S) Suspended
- (I) Ineligible
- (W) Walk-on
- Injured
- Current redshirt

Roster
Last update: December 29, 2021

== Schedule and results ==
Date time, TV	Rank^{#}	Opponent^{#}	Result	Record	Site (attendance) city, state
Exhibition
October 30, 2021*; 3:00 pm		Case Western Reserve	W 100–56	–	Wolstein Center; Cleveland, OH
November 5, 2021*; 7:00 pm		Otterbein	W 74–33	–	Wolstein Center; Cleveland, OH
Regular season
November 9, 2021*; 10:00 pm		at BYU	L 59–69	0–1	Marriott Center; Provo, UT
November 13, 2021*; 7:00 pm, ESPN+		Ohio	L 56–67	0–2	Wolstein Center (3,166); Cleveland, OH
November 16, 2021*; 7:00 pm, ESPN+		Edinboro	W 75–61	1–2	Wolstein Center (1,508); Cleveland, OH
November 20, 2021*; 2:00 pm, ESPN+		Canisius; Cerebro Sports Lake Erie Challenge	W 80–70	2–2	Wolstein Center (1,492); Cleveland, OH
November 22, 2021*; 7:00 pm, ESPN+		Coppin State; Cerebro Sports Lake Erie Challenge	W 65–62	3–2	Wolstein Center (1,572); Cleveland, OH
November 27, 2021*; 3:00 pm, ESPN+		Penn State–Behrend	W 89–47	4–2	Wolstein Center (1,333); Cleveland, OH
December 2, 2021; 7:00 pm, ESPN+		Northern Kentucky	W 72–58	5–2 (1–0)	Wolstein Center (1,729); Cleveland, OH
December 4, 2021; 3:00 pm, ESPN+		Wright State	W 85–75	6–2 (2–0)	Wolstein Center (1,721); Cleveland, OH
December 13, 2021*; 8:00 pm, Big 12 Now		at Oklahoma State	L 93–98 ^{OT}	6–3	Gallagher-Iba Arena (6,961); Stillwater, OK
December 18, 2021*; 4:00 pm, ACCN		at No. 2 Duke	Canceled due to COVID-19 issues		Cameron Indoor Stadium; Durham, NC
December 21, 2021*; 7:00 pm, ESPN3		at Kent State	Canceled due to COVID-19 issues		MAC Center; Kent, OH
December 30, 2021; 7:00 pm		at IUPUI	Canceled due to COVID-19 issues at IUPUI		Indiana Farmers Coliseum; Indianapolis, IN
December 30, 2021; 7:00 pm		Purdue Fort Wayne	W 90–81	7–3 (3–0)	Wolstein Center (617); Cleveland, OH
January 1, 2022; 4:12 pm, ESPN+		at UIC	Canceled due to COVID-19 issues at UIC		Credit Union 1 Arena; Chicago, IL
January 5, 2022; 7:00 pm, ESPN+		Purdue Fort Wayne	W 65–58	8–3 (4–0)	Wolstein Center (1,642); Cleveland, OH
January 7, 2022; 7:00 pm, ESPN+		at Robert Morris	W 78–77	9–3 (5–0)	UPMC Events Center (542); Moon Township, PA
January 9, 2022; 2:00 pm, ESPN+		at Youngstown State	W 86–80 ^{OT}	10–3 (6–0)	Beeghly Center (1,773); Youngstown, OH
January 13, 2022; 7:00 pm, ESPN+		Oakland	L 65–70	10–4 (6–1)	Wolstein Center (2,312); Cleveland, OH
January 15, 2022; 3:30 pm, ESPN+		Detroit Mercy	W 72–70	11–4 (7–1)	Wolstein Center (1,901); Cleveland, OH
January 21, 2022; 7:00 pm, ESPN+		Youngstown State	W 64–61	12–4 (8–1)	Wolstein Center (2,290); Cleveland, OH
January 23, 2022; 3:00 pm, ESPN+		Robert Morris	W 75–68	13–4 (9–1)	Wolstein Center (1,694); Cleveland, OH
January 28, 2022; 9:00 pm, ESPNU		at Wright State	W 71–67	14–4 (10–1)	Nutter Center (5,328); Dayton, OH
January 30, 2022; 2:00 pm, ESPN+		at Northern Kentucky	L 72–78	14–5 (10–2)	BB&T Arena (1,993); Highland Heights, KY
February 4, 2022; 7:00 pm, ESPN+		Green Bay	W 85–69	15–5 (11–2)	Wolstein Center (2,111); Cleveland, OH
February 6, 2022; 3:00 pm, ESPN+		Milwaukee	W 84–71	16–5 (12–2)	Wolstein Center (2,147); Cleveland, OH
February 10, 2022; 7:00 pm, ESPN+		UIC	L 75–76	16–6 (12–3)	Wolstein Center (2,175); Cleveland, OH
February 12, 2022; 3:00 pm, ESPN+		IUPUI	W 83–45	17–6 (13–3)	Wolstein Center (4,002); Cleveland, OH
February 14, 2022; 7:00 pm, ESPN+		at Purdue Fort Wayne	L 98–102 ^{3OT}	17–7 (13–4)	Allen County War Memorial Coliseum (1,165); Fort Wayne, IN
February 18, 2022; 8:00 pm, ESPN+		at Milwaukee	W 78–61	18–7 (14–4)	UW–Milwaukee Panther Arena (2,355); Milwaukee, WI
February 20, 2022; 3:00 pm, ESPN+		at Green Bay	W 79–67	19–7 (15–4)	Kress Events Center (1,845); Green Bay, WI
February 24, 2022; 7:00 pm, ESPN+		at Detroit Mercy	L 67–74	19–8 (15–5)	Calihan Hall (1,833); Detroit, MI
February 26, 2022; 3:00 pm, ESPN+		at Oakland	L 57–65	19–9 (15–6)	Athletics Center O'rena (3,149); Auburn Hills, MI
Horizon League tournament
March 3, 2022; 7:00 pm, ESPN+	(1)	(10) Robert Morris; Quarterfinals	W 83–67	20–9	Wolstein Center; Cleveland, OH
March 7, 2022; 7:00 pm, ESPNU	(1)	vs. (4) Wright State; Semifinals	L 67–82	20–10	Indiana Farmers Coliseum; Indianapolis, IN
National Invitation tournament
March 15, 2022; 9:00 pm, ESPNU		at (2) Xavier; First Round – Dayton Bracket	L 68–72	20–11	Cintas Center (1,482); Cincinnati, OH
*Non-conference game. ^{#}Rankings from AP Poll. (#) Tournament seedings in parentheses. All times are in Eastern.
