= 2021–22 Detroit Mercy Titans men's basketball team =

American college basketball season

2021–22 Detroit Mercy Titans men's basketball

The Basketball Classic, first round
- Conference: Horizon League
- Record: 14–16 (10–7 Horizon)
- Head coach: Mike Davis (4th season)
- Assistant coaches: Mike Davis Jr.; Tracy Dildy; Donnie Marsh
- Home arena: Calihan Hall

2021–22 Horizon League men's basketball standings
	Conf.				Overall
Team	W		L	PCT	W		L	PCT
Cleveland State	15	–	6	.714	20	–	11	.645
Purdue Fort Wayne	15	–	6	.714	21	–	12	.636
Northern Kentucky	14	–	6	.700	20	–	12	.625
Wright State †	15	–	7	.682	22	–	14	.611
Oakland	12	–	7	.632	20	–	12	.625
Detroit Mercy	10	–	7	.588	14	–	15	.483
Youngstown State	12	–	9	.571	19	–	15	.559
UIC	9	–	10	.474	14	–	16	.467
Milwaukee	8	–	14	.364	10	–	22	.313
Robert Morris	5	–	16	.238	8	–	23	.258
Green Bay	4	–	16	.200	5	–	25	.167
IUPUI	1	–	16	.059	3	–	26	.103
† 2022 Horizon League tournament winner

The 2021–22 Detroit Mercy Titans men's basketball team represented the University of Detroit Mercy in the 2021–22 NCAA Division I men's basketball season. The Titans, led by fourth-year head coach Mike Davis, played their home games at Calihan Hall in Detroit, Michigan as members of the Horizon League. They finished the season 14–15, 10–7 in Horizon League play, to finish in sixth place. They defeated Green Bay in the first round of the Horizon League tournament before losing to Northern Kentucky in the quarterfinals. They received an invitation to The Basketball Classic postseason tournament, formerly known as the CollegeInsider.com Tournament where they lost to Florida Gulf Coast in the first round.

== Previous season ==
In a season limited due to the ongoing COVID-19 pandemic, the Titans finished the 2020–21 season 12–10, 10–6 in Horizon League play, to finish in third place. They defeated Robert Morris in the first round of the Horizon League tournament before falling to Northern Kentucky in the quarterfinals.

== Roster ==
2021–22 Detroit Mercy Titans men's basketball team
Players
Coaches

Pos.	#	Name	Height	Weight	Year	Hometown
G	0	Antoine Davis	6 ft 1 in (1.85 m)	165 lb (75 kg)	Sr	Birmingham, AL
G/F	1	Noah Waterman	6 ft 11 in (2.11 m)	210 lb (95 kg)	Jr	Savannah, NY
G	2	Kyle LeGreair	6 ft 0 in (1.83 m)	180 lb (82 kg)	So	Detroit, MI
G/F	4	DJ Harvey	6 ft 6 in (1.98 m)	235 lb (107 kg)	GS	Bowie, MD
F	5	Madut Akec	6 ft 7 in (2.01 m)	205 lb (93 kg)	Jr	Bradenton, FL
G	10	Bryon Jr. Ottrix	5 ft 10 in (1.78 m)	150 lb (68 kg)	Fr	Cincinnati, OH
G	11	Jeramy Shaw	6 ft 6 in (1.98 m)	205 lb (93 kg)	Jr	St. Louis, MO
F	12	Jordan Phillips	6 ft 7 in (2.01 m)	215 lb (98 kg)	Sr	Fort Worth, TX
G	13	Matt Johnson	6 ft 4 in (1.93 m)	180 lb (82 kg)	Sr	Baltimore, MD
F	15	Prince Oduro	6 ft 8 in (2.03 m)	250 lb (113 kg)	Sr	Toronto, ON
G	21	Kevin McAdoo	6 ft 2 in (1.88 m)	180 lb (82 kg)	GS	Pontiac, MI
C	23	Mohamed Sylla	6 ft 11 in (2.11 m)	235 lb (107 kg)	Jr	Abidjan, Ivory Coast
C	33	Buay Koka	7 ft 1 in (2.16 m)	202 lb (92 kg)	GS	Nasir, South Sudan
F	41	Willy Isiani	6 ft 8 in (2.03 m)	230 lb (104 kg)	Sr	Tbilisi, Georgia

Head coach

- Mike Davis (Alabama)

Assistant coach(es)

- Mike Davis Jr. (UAB)
- Tracy Dildy (UIC)
- Donnie Marsh (Franklin & Marshall)

Legend

- (C) Team captain
- (S) Suspended
- (I) Ineligible
- (W) Walk-on
- Injured
- Current redshirt

Roster
Last update: November 13, 2021

== Schedule and results ==
Date time, TV	Rank^{#}	Opponent^{#}	Result	Record	Site (attendance) city, state
Regular season
November 10, 2021*; 9:00 p.m., MWN		at Wyoming	L 47–85	0–1	Arena-Auditorium (3,259); Laramie, WY
November 13, 2021*; 7:00 p.m., ESPN3		at Toledo	L 73–81	0–2	Savage Arena (5,086); Toledo, OH
November 16, 2021*; 8:00 p.m., SECN+/ESPN+		at Mississippi State	L 64–77	0–3	Humphrey Coliseum (6,497); Starkville, MS
November 20, 2021*; 2:00 p.m., ACCNX/ESPN+		at Louisville	L 67–73	0–4	KFC Yum! Center (12,561); Louisville, KY
November 27, 2021*; 2:00 p.m., FloSports		at Hofstra	L 84–98	0–5	Mack Sports Complex (1,845); Hempstead, NY
November 30, 2021*; 7:00 p.m., FloSports		at Northeastern	L 56–66	0–6	Matthews Arena (872); Boston, MA
December 2, 2021; 7:00 p.m., ESPN+		at IUPUI	W 69–45	1–6 (1–0)	Indiana Farmers Coliseum (892); Indianapolis, IN
December 5, 2021; 2:00 p.m., ESPN+		at UIC	W 64–56	2–6 (2–0)	Credit Union 1 Arena (2,111); Chicago, IL
December 9, 2021*; 7:00 p.m., ESPN3		at Kent State	L 52–69	2–7	MAC Center (2,176); Kent, OH
December 11, 2021*; 1:00 p.m., ESPN+		Western Michigan	W 83–64	3–7	Calihan Hall (1,873); Detroit, MI
December 19, 2021*; 1:00 p.m., ESPN+		Central Michigan	W 89–75	4–7	Calihan Hall (1,921); Detroit, MI
December 30, 2021; 7:00 p.m., ESPN+		Youngstown State	Canceled due to COVID-19 protocols		Calihan Hall; Detroit, MI
January 1, 2022; 3:00 p.m., ESPN+		Robert Morris	Canceled due to COVID-19 protocols		Calihan Hall; Detroit, MI
January 5, 2022; 7:00 p.m., ESPN+		Oakland	Canceled due to COVID-19 protocols		Calihan Hall; Detroit, MI
January 7, 2022; 7:00 p.m., ESPN2		Milwaukee	W 85–60	5–7 (3–0)	Calihan Hall (2,320); Detroit, MI
January 9, 2022; 1:00 p.m., ESPN+		Green Bay	Canceled due to COVID-19 protocols		Calihan Hall; Detroit, MI
January 13, 2022; 7:00 p.m., ESPN+		at Purdue Fort Wayne	L 60–62	5–8 (3–1)	Allen County War Memorial Coliseum (1,113); Fort Wayne, IN
January 15, 2022; 3:30 p.m., ESPN+		at Cleveland State	L 70–72	5–9 (3–2)	Wolstein Center (1,901); Cleveland, OH
January 20, 2022; 8:00 p.m., ESPN+		at Green Bay	L 63–70	5–10 (3–3)	Resch Center (1,387); Ashwaubenon, WI
January 22, 2022; 3:00 p.m., ESPN+		at Milwaukee	W 71–58	6–10 (4–3)	UW–Milwaukee Panther Arena (2,018); Milwaukee, WI
January 27, 2022; 7:00 p.m., ESPN+		UIC	W 80–67	7–10 (5–3)	Calihan Hall (1,795); Detroit, MI
January 29, 2022; 1:00 p.m., ESPN+		IUPUI	Canceled due to COVID-19 protocols		Calihan Hall; Detroit, MI
January 31, 2022*; 7:00 p.m., ESPN+		Michigan–Dearborn	W 96–51	8–10	Calihan Hall (1,211); Detroit, MI
February 4, 2022; 7:00 p.m., ESPN+		at Wright State	L 59–90	8–11 (5–4)	Nutter Center (2,886); Dayton, OH
February 5, 2022; 7:00 p.m., ESPN+		at Northern Kentucky	W 74–68	9–11 (6–4)	BB&T Arena (3,100); Highland Heights, KY
February 9, 2022; 7:00 p.m., ESPN+		at Robert Morris	W 79–62	10–11 (7–4)	UPMC Events Center (703); Moon Township, PA
February 11, 2022; 7:00 p.m., ESPN+		at Youngstown State	L 69–82	10–12 (7–5)	Beeghly Center (1,970); Youngstown, OH
February 13, 2022; 1:00 p.m., ESPN+		at Oakland	L 59–75	10–13 (7–6)	Athletics Center O'rena (3,809); Auburn Hills, MI
February 18, 2022; 7:00 p.m., ESPN+		Northern Kentucky	W 60–52	11–13 (8–6)	Calihan Hall (1,441); Detroit, MI
February 20, 2022; 1:00 p.m., ESPN+		Wright State	W 80–75	12–13 (9–6)	Calihan Hall (1,843); Detroit, MI
February 24, 2022; 7:00 p.m., ESPN+		Cleveland State	W 74–67	13–13 (10–6)	Calihan Hall (1,833); Detroit, MI
February 26, 2022; 1:00 p.m., ESPN+		Purdue Fort Wayne	L 78–81	13–14 (10–7)	Calihan Hall (2,524); Detroit, MI
Horizon League tournament
March 1, 2022; 7:00 p.m., ESPN+	(6)	(11) Green Bay; First round	W 79–62	14–14	Calihan Hall (1,817); Detroit, MI
March 3, 2022; 7:00 p.m., ESPN+	(6)	at (3) Northern Kentucky; Quarterfinals	L 59–77	14–15	BB&T Arena (2,177); Highland Heights, KY
The Basketball Classic
March 16, 2022*; 7:00 p.m.		at Florida Gulf Coast; First round	L 79–95	14–16	Alico Arena; Fort Myers, FL
*Non-conference game. ^{#}Rankings from AP poll. (#) Tournament seedings in parentheses. All times are in Eastern.
