= 2021–22 Wright State Raiders men's basketball team =

American college basketball season

2021–22 Wright State Raiders men's basketball

Horizon League tournament champions

NCAA tournament, First Round
- Conference: Horizon League
- Record: 22–14 (15–7 Horizon)
- Head coach: Scott Nagy (6th season)
- Associate head coach: Clint Sargent
- Assistant coaches: Dan Beré; Travis Trice
- Home arena: Nutter Center

2021–22 Horizon League men's basketball standings
	Conf.				Overall
Team	W		L	PCT	W		L	PCT
Cleveland State	15	–	6	.714	20	–	11	.645
Purdue Fort Wayne	15	–	6	.714	21	–	12	.636
Northern Kentucky	14	–	6	.700	20	–	12	.625
Wright State †	15	–	7	.682	22	–	14	.611
Oakland	12	–	7	.632	20	–	12	.625
Detroit Mercy	10	–	7	.588	14	–	15	.483
Youngstown State	12	–	9	.571	19	–	15	.559
UIC	9	–	10	.474	14	–	16	.467
Milwaukee	8	–	14	.364	10	–	22	.313
Robert Morris	5	–	16	.238	8	–	23	.258
Green Bay	4	–	16	.200	5	–	25	.167
IUPUI	1	–	16	.059	3	–	26	.103
† 2022 Horizon League tournament winner

The 2021–22 Wright State Raiders men's basketball team represented Wright State University in the 2021–22 NCAA Division I men's basketball season. The Raiders, led by sixth-year head coach Scott Nagy, played their home games at the Nutter Center in Dayton, Ohio as members of the Horizon League. They finished the season 22–14, 15–7 in Horizon League Play to finish in fourth place. As the No. 4 seed, they defeated Oakland, Cleveland State, and Northern Kentucky to win the Horizon League tournament. They received the conference’s automatic bid to the NCAA tournament as the No. 16 seed in the South Region, where they defeated Bryant in the First Four before losing in the first round to Arizona.

== Previous season ==
In a season limited due to the ongoing COVID-19 pandemic, the Raiders finished the 2020–21 season 18–6, 16–4 in Horizon League play to finish as Horizon League regular season co-champions, alongside Cleveland State. However, as the No. 2 seed in the Horizon League tournament, they were upset by Milwaukee in the quarterfinals.

== Roster ==
2021–22 Wright State Raiders men's basketball team
Players
Coaches

Pos.	#	Name	Height	Weight	Year	Hometown
F	00	Grant Basile	6 ft 9 in (2.06 m)	225 lb (102 kg)	RS Jr	Pewaukee, Wisconsin
G	1	Trey Calvin	6 ft 0 in (1.83 m)	165 lb (75 kg)	Jr	Glendale Heights, Illinois
G	2	Tanner Holden	6 ft 6 in (1.98 m)	185 lb (84 kg)	Jr	Wheelersburg, Ohio
G	3	Alex Huibregtse	6 ft 3 in (1.91 m)	195 lb (88 kg)	So	Grafton, Wisconsin
G	4	Keaton Norris	6 ft 0 in (1.83 m)	165 lb (75 kg)	Fr	Hilliard, Ohio
F/C	5	CJ Wilbourn	6 ft 7 in (2.01 m)	235 lb (107 kg)	Jr	Bloomington, Illinois
C	12	AJ Braun	6 ft 9 in (2.06 m)	230 lb (104 kg)	Fr	Dayton, Ohio
F	13	Riley Voss	6 ft 6 in (1.98 m)	230 lb (104 kg)	Sr	Milford, Ohio
F	14	Brandon Noel	6 ft 8 in (2.03 m)	235 lb (107 kg)	RS Fr	Lucasville, Ohio
F	20	Andy Neff	6 ft 7 in (2.01 m)	215 lb (98 kg)	Sr	Oakwood, Ohio
G	22	Andrew Welage	6 ft 6 in (1.98 m)	180 lb (82 kg)	So	Greensburg, Indiana
F	23	James Manns	6 ft 7 in (2.01 m)	210 lb (95 kg)	RS Sr	Columbus, Ohio
G	24	Tim Finke	6 ft 6 in (1.98 m)	215 lb (98 kg)	Jr	Champaign, Illinois
G	32	TJ Nagy	6 ft 1 in (1.85 m)	175 lb (79 kg)	Jr	Bellbrook, Ohio

Head coach

- Scott Nagy (Delta State)

Assistant coach(es)

- Clint Sargent (South Dakota State)
- Dan Beré (Indiana)
- Travis Trice (Butler)

Legend

- (C) Team captain
- (S) Suspended
- (I) Ineligible
- (W) Walk-on
- Injured
- Current redshirt

Roster
Last update: November 14, 2021

== Schedule and results ==
Date time, TV	Rank^{#}	Opponent^{#}	Result	Record	Site (attendance) city, state
Regular season
November 9, 2021*; 7:00 pm, ESPN+		Lake Erie	W 86–53	1–0	Nutter Center (3,717); Dayton, OH
November 12, 2021*; 7:00 pm, ESPN+		at Marshall	L 88–96	1–1	Cam Henderson Center (4,781); Huntington, WV
November 16, 2021*; 7:00 pm, BTN		at No. 6 Purdue	L 52–96	1–2	Mackey Arena (14,804); West Lafayette, IN
November 22, 2021*; 2:30 pm, FloHoops		vs. George Washington; Naples Invitational First Round	L 63–74	1–3	Community School of Naples (433); Naples, FL
November 23, 2021*; 12:00 pm, FloHoops		vs. James Madison; Naples Invitational Consolation 2nd Round	L 76–78	1–4	Community School of Naples (337); Naples, FL
November 24, 2021*; 12:00 pm, FloHoops		vs. Long Beach State; Naples Invitational 7th place game	L 76–85	1–5	Community School of Naples (107); Naples, FL
December 2, 2021; 7:00 pm, ESPN+		at Purdue Fort Wayne	W 86–73	2–5 (1–0)	Allen County War Memorial Coliseum (1,229); Fort Wayne, IN
December 4, 2021; 3:00 pm, ESPN+		at Cleveland State	L 75–85	2–6 (1–1)	Wolstein Center (1,721); Cleveland, OH
December 15, 2021*; 7:00 pm, ESPN+		Akron	L 48–66	2–7	Nutter Center (3,503); Dayton, OH
December 18, 2021*; 2:00 pm, ESPN+		Tennessee Tech	W 72–63	3–7	Nutter Center (2,827); Dayton, OH
December 21, 2021*; 7:00 pm, ACCNX		at NC State	W 84–70	4–7	PNC Arena (11,344); Raleigh, NC
December 30, 2021; 7:00 pm, ESPN+		Milwaukee	W 80–75	5–7 (2–1)	Nutter Center (3,357); Dayton, OH
January 1, 2022; 2:00 pm, ESPN+		Green Bay	W 72–69	6–7 (3–1)	Nutter Center (2,677); Dayton, OH
January 6, 2022; 7:00 pm, ESPN+		UIC	W 90–72	7–7 (4–1)	Nutter Center (2,862); Dayton, OH
January 8, 2022; 2:00 pm, ESPN+		IUPUI	W 72–58	8–7 (5–1)	Nutter Center (2,967); Dayton, OH
January 10, 2022; 6:00 pm, ESPN+		at Northern Kentucky	Postponed to Jan. 25 due to COVID-19 protocols		BB&T Arena; Highland Heights, KY
January 13, 2022; 7:00 pm, ESPN+		at Robert Morris	W 75–73	9–7 (6–1)	UPMC Events Center (743); Moon Township, PA
January 15, 2022; 7:00 pm, ESPN+		at Youngstown State	L 87–90	9–8 (6–2)	Beeghly Center (2,032); Youngstown, OH
January 20, 2022; 7:00 pm, ESPN+		at IUPUI	W 73–45	10–8 (7–2)	Indiana Farmers Coliseum (692); Indianapolis, IN
January 22, 2022; 8:00 pm, ESPN+		at UIC	W 97–81	11–8 (8–2)	Credit Union 1 Arena (1,819); Chicago, IL
January 25, 2022; 7:00 pm, ESPN+		at Northern Kentucky; Rescheduled from January 10	L 63–73	11–9 (8–3)	BB&T Arena (2,421); Highland Heights, KY
January 28, 2022; 9:00 pm, ESPNU		Cleveland State	L 67–71	11–10 (8–4)	Nutter Center (5,328); Dayton, OH
January 30, 2022; 12:00 pm, ESPN+		Purdue Fort Wayne	W 75–63	12–10 (9–4)	Nutter Center (2,877); Dayton, OH
February 4, 2022; 7:00 pm, ESPN+		Detroit Mercy	W 90–59	13–10 (10–4)	Nutter Center (2,886); Dayton, OH
February 5, 2022; 7:00 pm, ESPN+		Oakland	W 75–64	14–10 (11–4)	Nutter Center (3,687); Dayton, OH
February 9, 2022; 8:00 pm, ESPN+		at Green Bay	W 79–62	15–10 (12–4)	Resch Center (1,621); Ashwaubenon, WI
February 11, 2022; 8:00 pm, ESPN+		at Milwaukee	L 57–60	15–11 (12–5)	UW–Milwaukee Panther Arena (2,445); Milwaukee, WI
February 13, 2022; 2:00 pm, ESPN+		Northern Kentucky	L 71–75	15–12 (12–6)	Nutter Center (2,232); Dayton, OH
February 18, 2022; 9:00 pm, ESPN2		at Oakland	W 78–74	16–12 (13–6)	Athletics Center O'rena (3,912); Auburn Hills, MI
February 20, 2022; 1:00 pm, ESPN+		at Detroit Mercy	L 75–80	16–13 (13–7)	Calihan Hall (1,843); Detroit, MI
February 24, 2022; 7:00 pm, ESPN+		Youngstown State	W 84–71	17–13 (14–7)	Nutter Center (3,059); Dayton, OH
February 26, 2022; 7:00 pm, ESPN+		Robert Morris	W 71–61	18–13 (15–7)	Nutter Center (3,796); Dayton, OH
Horizon League tournament
March 3, 2022; 7:00 pm, ESPN+	(4)	(5) Oakland; Quarterfinals	W 75–63	19–13	Nutter Center (2,873); Dayton, OH
March 7, 2022; 7:00 pm, ESPNU	(4)	vs. (1) Cleveland State; Semifinals	W 82–67	20–13	Indiana Farmers Coliseum; Indianapolis, IN
March 8, 2022; 9:30 pm, ESPN	(4)	vs. (3) Northern Kentucky; Championship	W 72–71	21–13	Indiana Farmers Coliseum; Indianapolis, IN
NCAA Tournament
March 16, 2022*; 6:40 pm, TruTV	(16 S)	vs. (16 S) Bryant; First Four	W 93–82	22–13	UD Arena (9,999); Dayton, OH
March 18, 2022*; 7:27 pm, TruTV	(16 S)	vs. (1 S) No. 2 Arizona; First Round	L 70–87	22–14	Viejas Arena (11,399); San Diego, CA
*Non-conference game. ^{#}Rankings from AP Poll. (#) Tournament seedings in parentheses. All times are in Eastern.

== Awards and honors ==
Tanner Holden	First Team All Horizon League
Grant Basile	Second Team All Horizon League
AJ Braun	Horizon League All Newcomer Team
Grant Basile	Horizon League All Tournament Team (MVP)
Trey Calvin	Horizon League All Tournament Team
Tanner Holden	Horizon League All Tournament Team

== Statistics ==
Number	Name	Games	Average	Points	Assists	Rebounds
2	Tanner Holden	36	20.1	723	92	257
00	Grant Basile	36	18.4	664	72	307
1	Trey Calvin	34	14.6	495	114	110
24	Tim Finke	36	8.8	315	98	187
12	AJ Braun	28	5.4	151	13	85
22	Andrew Welage	34	4.1	139	41	62
23	James Manns	34	4.1	139	41	12
4	Keaton Norris	36	3.2	114	65	71
3	Alex Huibregtse	3	3.0	9	2	4
5	C.J. Wilbourn	33	1.8	59	5	41
13	Riley Voss	9	1.6	14	3	8
20	Andy Neff	11	0.9	10	1	12
32	TJ Nagy	11	0.1	1	0	3
