= 2021–22 Milwaukee Panthers men's basketball team =

American college basketball season

2021–22 Milwaukee Panthers men's basketball
- Conference: Horizon League
- Record: 10–22 (8–14 Horizon)
- Head coach: Patrick Baldwin (5th season)
- Assistant coaches: Paris Parham; Terrance McGee; John Bowler
- Home arena: UW–Milwaukee Panther Arena

2021–22 Horizon League men's basketball standings
	Conf.				Overall
Team	W		L	PCT	W		L	PCT
Cleveland State	15	–	6	.714	20	–	11	.645
Purdue Fort Wayne	15	–	6	.714	21	–	12	.636
Northern Kentucky	14	–	6	.700	20	–	12	.625
Wright State †	15	–	7	.682	22	–	14	.611
Oakland	12	–	7	.632	20	–	12	.625
Detroit Mercy	10	–	7	.588	14	–	15	.483
Youngstown State	12	–	9	.571	19	–	15	.559
UIC	9	–	10	.474	14	–	16	.467
Milwaukee	8	–	14	.364	10	–	22	.313
Robert Morris	5	–	16	.238	8	–	23	.258
Green Bay	4	–	16	.200	5	–	25	.167
IUPUI	1	–	16	.059	3	–	26	.103
† 2022 Horizon League tournament winner

The 2021–22 Milwaukee Panthers men's basketball team represented the University of Wisconsin–Milwaukee during the 2021–22 NCAA Division I men's basketball season. The Panthers, led by fifth-year head coach Pat Baldwin, played their home games at the UW–Milwaukee Panther Arena in Milwaukee, Wisconsin as members of the Horizon League.

They finished the season 10–21, 8–14 in Horizon League play, to finish in ninth place. They lost in the first round of the Horizon League tournament to UIC.

On March 2, 2022, the school fired head coach Pat Baldwin. On March 19, the school named Division II Queens University head coach Bart Lundy the team's new head coach.

== Previous season ==
In a season limited due to the ongoing COVID-19 pandemic, the Panthers finished the 2020–21 season 10–12, 7–10 in Horizon League play, to finish in eighth place. In the Horizon League tournament, they defeated IUPUI in the first round and Wright State in the quarterfinals, before losing to Cleveland State in the semifinals.

== Offseason ==
=== Departures ===
Name	Number	Pos.	Height	Weight	Year	Hometown	Notes
Te'Jon Lucas	3	G	6' 2"	180	RS Senior	Milwaukee, WI	Transferred to BYU
C. J. Wilbourn	5	F	6' 7"	233	RS Sophomore	Bloomington, IL	Transferred to Wright State
Amir Allen	12	F	6' 8"	225	RS Senior	Randolph, NJ	Graduated
Courtney Brown Jr.	14	F	6' 7"	205	RS Sophomore	Cottage Grove, MN	Transferred to St. Thomas

=== 2021 recruiting class ===
College recruiting
Name	Hometown	School	Height	Weight	Commit date
Patrick Baldwin Jr. PF	Sussex, WI	Hamilton	6 ft 10 in (2.08 m)	220 lb (100 kg)	May 12, 2021
Patrick Baldwin Jr. PF	Recruit ratings: Rivals: 247Sports: ESPN: (97)				
Jason Sinani; SF	Oak Creek, WI	Oak Creek	6 ft 3 in (1.91 m)	N/A	
Jason Sinani; SF	Recruit ratings: Rivals: 247Sports: ESPN: (NR)				
Kyle Ross; PF	St. John, IN	Lake Central	6 ft 7 in (2.01 m)	215 lb (98 kg)	
Kyle Ross; PF	Recruit ratings: 247Sports:				
Overall recruit ranking:
Note: In many cases, Scout, Rivals, 247Sports, On3, and ESPN may conflict in their listings of height and weight.; In these cases, the average was taken. ESPN grades are on a 100-point scale.; Sources: "2021 Team Ranking". Rivals.

== Preseason ==
The Panthers were picked to finish in fourth place in the Horizon League in the coaches' poll, receiving two first-place votes and a total of 396 points. Patrick Baldwin Jr. was selected to the Preseason First Team All-Horizon League, while DeAndre Gholston was selected to the Preseason Second Team All-Horizon League.

== Roster ==
2021–22 Milwaukee Panthers men's basketball team
Players
Coaches

Pos.	#	Name	Height	Weight	Year	Hometown
G	0	Donovan Newby	6 ft 1 in (1.85 m)	190 lb (86 kg)	RS Fr	Chicago Heights, IL
G	1	Devon Hancock	6 ft 3 in (1.91 m)	190 lb (86 kg)	So	Dallas, TX
G	2	Jordan Lathon	6 ft 4 in (1.93 m)	200 lb (91 kg)	RS Jr	Grandview, MO
G	3	Jason Sinani	6 ft 3 in (1.91 m)	193 lb (88 kg)	Fr	Oak Creek, WI
G	4	Deandre Gholston	6 ft 5 in (1.96 m)	215 lb (98 kg)	RS Sr	Gary, IN
G	5	Markeith Browning II	6 ft 4 in (1.93 m)	186 lb (84 kg)	RS Fr	Ypsilanti, MI
G/F	11	Vin Jr. Baker	6 ft 9 in (2.06 m)	190 lb (86 kg)	RS Sr	Old Saybrook, CT
F	13	Kyle Ross	6 ft 6 in (1.98 m)	215 lb (98 kg)	Fr	St. John, IN
G	14	Tyler Ellingson	6 ft 5 in (1.96 m)	180 lb (82 kg)	RS So	Menomonee Falls, WI
F	20	Vincent Miszkiewicz	6 ft 7 in (2.01 m)	210 lb (95 kg)	RS So	Elgin, IL
F	21	Tafari Simms	6 ft 7 in (2.01 m)	212 lb (96 kg)	Sr	Hamilton, ON
G	22	Nick Pappas	6 ft 3 in (1.91 m)	180 lb (82 kg)	So	Phoenix, AZ
F	23	Patrick Baldwin Jr.	6 ft 9 in (2.06 m)	220 lb (100 kg)	Fr	Sussex, WI
G	24	Josh Thomas	6 ft 4 in (1.93 m)	205 lb (93 kg)	RS Sr	Chicago, IL
C	33	Moses Bol	7 ft 1 in (2.16 m)	225 lb (102 kg)	RS Sr	Wau, South Sudan
C	34	Samba Kane	7 ft 0 in (2.13 m)	220 lb (100 kg)	RS Jr	Dakar, Senegal
C	44	Joey St. Pierre	6 ft 10 in (2.08 m)	275 lb (125 kg)	RS Sr	Spring Grove, IL

Head coach

- Patrick Baldwin (Northwestern)

Assistant coach(es)

- Paris Parham (Minnesota State)
- Terrance McGee (Missouri State)
- John Bowler (Eastern Michigan)

Legend

- (C) Team captain
- (S) Suspended
- (I) Ineligible
- (W) Walk-on
- Injured
- Current redshirt

Roster
Last update: June 4, 2021

== Schedule and results ==
Date time, TV	Rank^{#}	Opponent^{#}	Result	Record	Site (attendance) city, state
Exhibition
October 30, 2021*; 2:00 p.m.		MSOE	W 69–63	–	UW–Milwaukee Panther Arena (2,017); Milwaukee, WI
Regular season
November 9, 2021*; 5:00 p.m., BSWI		at North Dakota	W 75–60	1–0	Betty Engelstad Sioux Center (1,628); Grand Forks, ND
November 13, 2021*; 6:00 p.m., ESPN+		Eastern Kentucky	L 71–77	1–1	UW–Milwaukee Panther Arena (4,318); Milwaukee, WI
November 18, 2021*; 5:00 p.m., SECN+/ESPN+		at No. 24 Florida	L 45–81	1–2	O'Connell Center (8,223); Gainesville, FL
November 23, 2021*; 1:30 p.m.		vs. Bowling Green; Fort Myers Tip-Off semifinal	L 68–82	1–3	Suncoast Credit Union Arena (574); Fort Myers, FL
November 24, 2021*; 10:00 a.m.		vs. Yale; Fort Myers Tip-Off consolation	L 56–69	1–4	Suncoast Credit Union Arena (333); Fort Myers, FL
November 28, 2021*; 1:00 p.m., ESPN+		Alcorn State	L 57–61	1–5	UW–Milwaukee Panther Arena (1,604); Milwaukee, WI
December 2, 2021; 7:00 p.m., ESPN+		Youngstown State	L 68–70	1–6 (0–1)	UW–Milwaukee Panther Arena (1,936); Milwaukee, WI
December 4, 2021; 11:00 a.m., ESPNU		Robert Morris	W 77–69	2–6 (1–1)	UW–Milwaukee Panther Arena (2,243); Milwaukee, WI
December 10, 2021*; 8:30 p.m., P12N		at Colorado	L 54–65	2–7	CU Events Center (6,388); Boulder, CO
December 13, 2021*; 7:00 p.m., ESPN+		Rhode Island	L 58–82	2–8	UW–Milwaukee Panther Arena (2,380); Milwaukee, WI
December 23, 2021*; 1:00 p.m., ESPN+		Saint Xavier (IL)	W 74–52	3–8	UW–Milwaukee Panther Arena (2,051); Milwaukee, WI
December 30, 2021; 6:00 p.m., ESPN+		at Wright State	L 75–80	3–9 (1–2)	Nutter Center (3,357); Dayton, OH
January 1, 2022; 1:00 p.m., ESPN+		at Northern Kentucky	W 61–55	4–9 (2–2)	BB&T Arena (2,365); Highland Heights, KY
January 5, 2022; 7:00 p.m., ESPN+		at Green Bay	W 63–49	5–9 (3–2)	Resch Center (2,149); Ashwaubenon, WI
January 7, 2022; 6:00 p.m., ESPN2		at Detroit Mercy	L 60–85	5–10 (3–3)	Calihan Hall (2,320); Detroit, MI
January 9, 2022; 3:00 p.m., ESPN+		at Oakland	L 65–86	5–11 (3–4)	Athletics Center O'rena (2,793); Rochester, MI
January 13, 2022; 7:00 p.m., ESPN+		UIC	L 77-81	5–12 (3–5)	UW–Milwaukee Panther Arena (1,790); Milwaukee, WI
January 15, 2022; 2:00 p.m., ESPN+		IUPUI	W 89–54	6–12 (4–5)	UW–Milwaukee Panther Arena (2,091); Milwaukee, WI
January 20, 2022; 7:00 p.m., ESPN+		Oakland	W 88–77	7–12 (5–5)	UW–Milwaukee Panther Arena (1,902); Milwaukee, WI
January 22, 2022; 2:00 p.m., ESPN+		Detroit Mercy	L 58–71	7–13 (5–6)	UW–Milwaukee Panther Arena (2,018); Milwaukee, WI
January 27, 2022; 6:00 p.m., ESPN+		at Robert Morris	L 53–77	7–14 (5–7)	UPMC Events Center (852); Moon Township, PA
January 29, 2022; 1:00 p.m., ESPN+		at Youngtown State	L 72–86	7–15 (5–8)	Beeghly Center (2,633); Youngstown, OH
February 4, 2022; 6:00 p.m., ESPN+		at Purdue Fort Wayne	L 60–70	7–16 (5–9)	Allen County War Memorial Coliseum (1,304); Fort Wayne, IN
February 6, 2022; 2:00 p.m., ESPN+		at Cleveland State	L 71–84	7–17 (5–10)	Wolstein Center (2,147); Cleveland, OH
February 9, 2022; 7:00 p.m., My24 Sports/ESPN+		Northern Kentucky	L 39–75	7–18 (5–11)	UW–Milwaukee Panther Arena (1,931); Milwaukee, WI
February 11, 2022; 7:00 p.m., ESPNU		Wright State	W 60–57	8–18 (6–11)	UW–Milwaukee Panther Arena (2,445); Milwaukee, WI
February 13, 2022; 1:00 p.m., My24 Sports/ESPN+		Green Bay	W 54–44	9–18 (7–11)	UW–Milwaukee Panther Arena (2,014); Milwaukee, WI
February 18, 2022; 7:00 p.m., ESPN+		Cleveland State	L 61–78	9–19 (7–12)	UW–Milwaukee Panther Arena (2,355); Milwaukee, WI
February 20, 2022; 1:00 p.m., ESPN+		Purdue Fort Wayne	L 71–81	9–20 (7–13)	UW–Milwaukee Panther Arena (2,144); Milwaukee, WI
February 24, 2022; 7:00 p.m., ESPN+		at IUPUI	W 66–54	10–20 (8–13)	Indiana Farmers Coliseum (603); Indianapolis, IN
February 26, 2022; 7:00 p.m., ESPN+		at UIC	L 58–71	10–21 (8–14)	Credit Union 1 Arena (3,165); Chicago, IL
Horizon League tournament
March 1, 2022*; 7:00 p.m., ESPN+	(9)	(8) UIC; First round	L 69–80	10–22	Milwaukee Panther Arena (803); Milwaukee, WI
*Non-conference game. ^{#}Rankings from AP poll. (#) Tournament seedings in parentheses. All times are in Central.
