= 2021–22 Youngstown State Penguins men's basketball team =

American college basketball season

2021–22 Youngstown State Penguins men's basketball

The Basketball Classic, quarterfinals
- Conference: Horizon League
- Record: 19–15 (12–9 Horizon)
- Head coach: Jerrod Calhoun (5th season)
- Assistant coaches: Ethan Faulkner (3rd season); Chinedu Nwachukwu (3rd season); Ben Asher (1st season)
- Home arena: Beeghly Center

2021–22 Horizon League men's basketball standings
	Conf.				Overall
Team	W		L	PCT	W		L	PCT
Cleveland State	15	–	6	.714	20	–	11	.645
Purdue Fort Wayne	15	–	6	.714	21	–	12	.636
Northern Kentucky	14	–	6	.700	20	–	12	.625
Wright State †	15	–	7	.682	22	–	14	.611
Oakland	12	–	7	.632	20	–	12	.625
Detroit Mercy	10	–	7	.588	14	–	15	.483
Youngstown State	12	–	9	.571	19	–	15	.559
UIC	9	–	10	.474	14	–	16	.467
Milwaukee	8	–	14	.364	10	–	22	.313
Robert Morris	5	–	16	.238	8	–	23	.258
Green Bay	4	–	16	.200	5	–	25	.167
IUPUI	1	–	16	.059	3	–	26	.103
† 2022 Horizon League tournament winner

The 2021–22 Youngstown State Penguins men's basketball team represented Youngstown State University in the 2021–22 NCAA Division I men's basketball season. The Penguins, led by fifth-year head coach Jerrod Calhoun, played their home games at the Beeghly Center in Youngstown, Ohio as members of the Horizon League. they finished the regular season 18–14, 12–9 in Horizon League play, to finish in seventh place. They lost to Robert Morris in the first round of the Horizon League tournament. The Penguins accepted an invitation to play in The Basketball Classic tournament, formerly known as the CollegeInsider.com Tournament.

== Previous season ==
In a season limited due to the ongoing COVID-19 pandemic, the Penguins finished the 2020–21 season 15–12, 9–11 in Horizon League play, to finish in sixth place. They defeated UIC in the first round of the Horizon League tournament before losing in the quarterfinals to Oakland.

== Offseason ==
=== Departures ===
Departures
Name	Pos.	Height	Weight	Year	Hometown	Notes
Christian Bentley	G	6' 3"	207	Senior	Brampton, ON	Graduated
Naz Bohannon	F	6' 6"	228	Senior	Lorain, OH	Transferred to Clemson
Kenny Ganley Jr.	G	6' 4"	195	RS Sophomore	Brecksville, OH	
Geoff Hamperian	G	6' 4"	205	Senior	Morgantown, WV	Transferred to Fort Hays State
Darius Quisenberry	G	6' 1"	188	Senior	Springfield, OH	Transferred to Fordham
Carson Ryan	F	6' 4"	200	Senior	Struthers, OH	
Cheick Traore	G	6' 8"	220	Sophomore	Concord, NC	Transferred to Chowan

=== Incoming transfers ===
Transfers
Name	Pos.	Height	Weight	Year	Hometown	Previous school
Dwayne Cohill	G	6' 2"	180	Junior	Cleveland, OH	Dayton
Collen Gurley	G	6' 2"	210	Senior	Alliance, OH	Mount Union
Owen Long	G	6' 2"	180	Junior	Sikeston, MO	Maryville College
Tevin Olison	G	6' 4"	200	Senior	Memphis, TN	Cumberlands
Chris Shelton	G	6' 4"	210	Junior	Richmond, VA	Hampton

=== Recruiting class ===
College recruiting information
Name	Hometown	School	Height	Weight	Commit date
Luke Chicone; PG	Mentor, OH	Mentor High School	5 ft 10 in (1.78 m)	170 lb (77 kg)	Nov 11, 2020
Luke Chicone; PG	Recruit ratings: Scout: Rivals: 247Sports: (NR)				
Josh Irwin; PF	Mayfield Heights, OH	West Geauga High School	6 ft 7 in (2.01 m)	235 lb (107 kg)	Nov 11, 2020
Josh Irwin; PF	Recruit ratings: Scout: Rivals: 247Sports: (NR)				
Michael Lucarotti; SG	Erie, PA	Cathedral Preparatory School	6 ft 4 in (1.93 m)	210 lb (95 kg)	Nov 11, 2020
Michael Lucarotti; SG	Recruit ratings: Rivals: 247Sports: (NR)				
Jacori Owens; PF	Charlotte, NC	Combine Academy	6 ft 9 in (2.06 m)	225 lb (102 kg)	Nov 11, 2020
Jacori Owens; PF	Recruit ratings: Rivals: 247Sports: (NR)				
Overall recruit ranking:
Note: In many cases, Scout, Rivals, 247Sports, On3, and ESPN may conflict in their listings of height and weight.; In these cases, the average was taken. ESPN grades are on a 100-point scale.; Sources: "2021 Team Ranking". Rivals.

== Roster ==
2021–22 Youngstown State Penguins men's basketball team
Players
Coaches

Pos.	#	Name	Height	Weight	Year	Hometown
G	0	Greyson Kelley	6 ft 2 in (1.88 m)	200 lb (91 kg)	RS Sr	Raleigh, NC
F	1	Jamir Thomas	6 ft 8 in (2.03 m)	275 lb (125 kg)	Sr	Passaic, NJ
G	2	Tevin Olison	6 ft 4 in (1.93 m)	200 lb (91 kg)	RS Sr	Memphis, TN
G	3	Collen Gurley	6 ft 2 in (1.88 m)	210 lb (95 kg)	Sr	Alliance, OH
G	5	Dwayne Cohill	6 ft 2 in (1.88 m)	180 lb (82 kg)	Jr	Cleveland, OH
G	10	Luke Chicone	5 ft 10 in (1.78 m)	170 lb (77 kg)	Fr	Mentor, OH
G	11	Daniel Ogoro	6 ft 5 in (1.96 m)	175 lb (79 kg)	RS So	London, England
G	13	Owen Long	6 ft 2 in (1.88 m)	180 lb (82 kg)	Jr	Sikeston, MO
G	14	Alex Vargo	6 ft 5 in (1.96 m)	210 lb (95 kg)	So	Wheeling, WV
G	15	Myles Hunter	6 ft 5 in (1.96 m)	210 lb (95 kg)	So	Charlotte, NC
F	20	Jacori Owens	6 ft 9 in (2.06 m)	225 lb (102 kg)	Fr	Charlotte, NC
G	21	Michael Lucarotti	6 ft 11 in (2.11 m)	210 lb (95 kg)	Fr	Erie, PA
G	22	Shemar Rathan-Mayes	5 ft 11 in (1.8 m)	175 lb (79 kg)	So	Toronto, ON
F	23	Josh Irwin	6 ft 7 in (2.01 m)	235 lb (107 kg)	Fr	Mayfield Heights, OH
G	24	Chris Shelton	6 ft 4 in (1.93 m)	210 lb (95 kg)	Jr	Richmond, VA
F	25	Williiam Dunn	6 ft 8 in (2.03 m)	220 lb (100 kg)	So	Quincy, MI
F	31	Michael Akuchie	6 ft 8 in (2.03 m)	220 lb (100 kg)	Sr	Plantation, FL
G	32	Garrett Covington	6 ft 5 in (1.96 m)	215 lb (98 kg)	Sr	Carmel, IN

Head coach

- Jerrod Calhoun (Cincinnati)

Assistant coach(es)

- Ethan Faulkner (Northern Kentucky)
- Chinedu Nwachukwu (Michigan)
- Ben Asher (West Virginia)

Legend

- (C) Team captain
- (S) Suspended
- (I) Ineligible
- (W) Walk-on
- Injured
- Current redshirt

Roster
Last update: June 3, 2025

== Schedule and results ==
Date time, TV	Rank^{#}	Opponent^{#}	Result	Record	Site (attendance) city, state
Regular season
November 10, 2021*; 8:30 p.m., BTN		at Penn State	L 59–75	0–1	Bryce Jordan Center (7,884); University Park, PA
November 13, 2021*; 6:30 p.m., ESPN+		at Southeast Missouri State	W 97–79	1–1	Show Me Center (1,280); Cape Girardeau, MO
November 19, 2021*; 5:00 p.m., ESPN+		St. Thomas; J. Arnold Wealth Management Company Basketball Tournament	W 79–75	2–1	Beeghly Center (1,393); Youngstown, OH
November 20, 2021*; 2:00 p.m., ESPN+		SIU Edwardsville; J. Arnold Wealth Management Company Basketball Tournament	L 66–69	2–2	Beeghly Center (1,309); Youngstown, OH
November 21, 2021*; 3:45 p.m., ESPN+		Niagara; J. Arnold Wealth Management Company Basketball Tournament	L 53–58	2–3	Beeghly Center (1,731); Youngstown, OH
December 2, 2021; 8:00 p.m., ESPN+		at Milwaukee	W 70–68	3–3 (1–0)	UW–Milwaukee Panther Arena (1,936); Milwaukee, WI
December 4, 2021; 7:00 p.m., ESPN+		at Green Bay	W 82–58	4–3 (2–0)	Kress Events Center (1,685); Green Bay, WI
December 8, 2021*; 7:00 p.m., ESPN+		Central Michigan	W 84–77	5–3	Beeghly Center (1,459); Youngstown, OH
December 11, 2021*; 2:00 p.m., ESPN+		Canisius	W 71–43	6–3	Beeghly Center (2,630); Youngstown, OH
December 18, 2021*; 12:00 p.m., ESPN+		Westminster	W 83–54	7–3	Beeghly Center (1,979); Youngstown, OH
December 22, 2021*; 6:00 p.m., Big 12 Now		at West Virginia	L 52–82	7–4	WVU Coliseum (9,784); Morgantown, WV
December 29, 2021*; 6:00 p.m.		Defiance	W 96–56	8–4	Beeghly Center (300); Youngstown, OH
December 30, 2021; 7:00 p.m., ESPN+		at Detroit Mercy	Canceled due to COVID-19 issues at Detroit Mercy		Calihan Hall; Detroit, MI
January 1, 2022; 3:00 p.m., ESPN+		at Oakland	L 72–87	8–5 (2–1)	Athletics Center O'rena (2,034); Auburn Hills, MI
January 5, 2022; 7:00 p.m., ESPN+		at Robert Morris	W 64–60	9–5 (3–1)	UPMC Events Center (353); Moon Township, PA
January 7, 2022; 7:00 p.m., ESPN+		Purdue Fort Wayne	L 61–71	9–6 (3–2)	Beeghly Center (1,290); Youngstown, OH
January 9, 2022; 2:00 p.m., ESPN+		Cleveland State	L 80–86	9–7 (3–3)	Beeghly Center (1,773); Youngstown, OH
January 13, 2022; 7:00 p.m., ESPN+		Northern Kentucky	L 67–68	9–8 (3–4)	Beeghly Center (1,634); Youngstown, OH
January 15, 2022; 7:00 p.m., ESPN+		Wright State	W 90–87	10–8 (4–4)	Beeghly Center (2,032); Youngstown, OH
January 21, 2022; 7:00 p.m., ESPN+		at Cleveland State	L 61–64	10–9 (4–5)	Wolstein Center (2,290); Cleveland, OH
January 23, 2022; 2:00 p.m., ESPN+		at Purdue Fort Wayne	L 71–82	10–10 (4–6)	Allen County War Memorial Coliseum (1,822); Fort Wayne, IN
January 27, 2022; 7:00 p.m., ESPN+		Green Bay	W 63–50	11–10 (5–6)	Beeghly Center (1,501); Youngstown, OH
January 29, 2022; 2:00 p.m., ESPN+		Milwaukee	W 86–72	12–10 (6–6)	Beeghly Center (2,633); Youngstown, OH
February 3, 2022; 7:00 p.m., ESPN+		at IUPUI	W 61–55	13–10 (7–6)	Indiana Farmers Coliseum (420); Indianapolis, IN
February 5, 2022; 2:00 p.m., ESPN+		UIC	W 66–64	14–10 (8–6)	Credit Union 1 Arena (2,314); Chicago, IL
February 9, 2022; 7:00 p.m., ESPN+		Oakland	W 78–71	15–10 (9–6)	Beeghly Center (1,580); Youngstown, OH
February 11, 2022; 7:00 p.m., ESPN+		Detroit Mercy	W 82–69	16–10 (10–6)	Beeghly Center (1,970); Youngstown, OH
February 13, 2022; 12:00 p.m., ESPN+		Robert Morris	L 68–73	16–11 (10–7)	Beeghly Center (1,241); Youngstown, OH
February 17, 2022; 7:00 p.m., ESPN+		UIC	W 88–79	17–11 (11–7)	Beeghly Center (1,823); Youngstown, OH
February 19, 2022; 2:00 p.m., ESPN+		IUPUI	W 74–61	18–11 (12–7)	Beeghly Center (2,110); Youngstown, OH
February 24, 2022; 7:00 p.m., ESPN+		at Wright State	L 71–84	18–12 (12–8)	Nutter Center (3,059); Dayton, OH
February 26, 2022; 7:00 p.m., ESPN+		at Northern Kentucky	L 61–75	18–13 (12–9)	BB&T Arena (2,747); Highland Heights, KY
Horizon League tournament
March 1, 2022; 7:00 p.m., ESPN+	(7)	(10) Robert Morris; First round	L 73–77	18–14	Beeghly Center; Youngstown, OH
The Basketball Classic
March 16, 2022; 8:00 p.m., ESPN+		Morgan State; First round	W 70–65	19–14	Beegley Center; Youngstown, OH
March 23, 2022; 10:00 p.m., ESPN+		at Fresno State; Quarterfinals	L 71–80	19–15	Save Mart Center; Fresno, CA
*Non-conference game. ^{#}Rankings from AP poll. (#) Tournament seedings in parentheses. All times are in Eastern.
