= 2021–22 IUPUI Jaguars men's basketball team =

American college basketball season

2021–2022 IUPUI Jaguars men's basketball
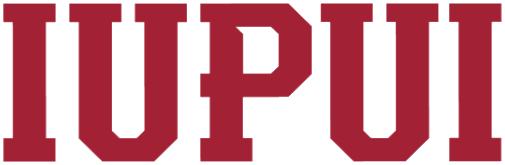
- Conference: Horizon League
- Record: 3–26 (1–16 Horizon)
- Head coach: Matt Crenshaw (1st season)
- Assistant coaches: Antwain Banks (1st season); Tommy Strine (1st season); Roy Hairston (1st season)
- Home arena: Indiana Farmers Coliseum

2021–22 Horizon League men's basketball standings
	Conf.				Overall
Team	W		L	PCT	W		L	PCT
Cleveland State	15	–	6	.714	20	–	11	.645
Purdue Fort Wayne	15	–	6	.714	21	–	12	.636
Northern Kentucky	14	–	6	.700	20	–	12	.625
Wright State †	15	–	7	.682	22	–	14	.611
Oakland	12	–	7	.632	20	–	12	.625
Detroit Mercy	10	–	7	.588	14	–	15	.483
Youngstown State	12	–	9	.571	19	–	15	.559
UIC	9	–	10	.474	14	–	16	.467
Milwaukee	8	–	14	.364	10	–	22	.313
Robert Morris	5	–	16	.238	8	–	23	.258
Green Bay	4	–	16	.200	5	–	25	.167
IUPUI	1	–	16	.059	3	–	26	.103
† 2022 Horizon League tournament winner

The 2021–22 IUPUI Jaguars men's basketball team represented Indiana University–Purdue University Indianapolis in the 2021–22 NCAA Division I men's basketball season. The Jaguars, led by first year head coach Matt Crenshaw, played their home games at Indiana Farmers Coliseum in Indianapolis, Indiana as members of the Horizon League.

== Previous season ==
The Jaguars finished the 2020–21 season 8–10, 7–9 in Horizon League play to finish in seventh place. They lost in the first round of the Horizon League tournament to Milwaukee.

== Offseason ==
=== Departures ===
Departures
Name	Pos.	Height	Weight	Year	Hometown	Notes
Marcus Burk	G	6'3	195	RS Senior	Indianapolis, IN	Graduated playing for the Grand Rapids Gold in the NBA G League
Amrit Dhaliwal	G	6'0	175	Sophomore	Modesto, CA	
Dimitri Georgiadis	G	6'9	245	Junior	Richmond, VA	Transferred to Virginia Tech to play football
Elyjah Goss	F	6'7	215	Senior	Bolingbrook, IL	Graduated
Acton Shirley	C	7'0	260	Junior	Zebulon, GA	Transferred to San Diego Christian
Sawyer Stoltz	F	6'9	200	Sophomore	Huntington, IN	

=== Incoming transfers ===
Transfers
Name	Pos.	Height	Weight	Year	Hometown	Previous school
Zach Gunn	F	6'6	210	Graduate Student	Fishers, IN	Ball State
B.J. Maxwell	G/F	6'5	200	Graduate Student	Austin, TX	St. Edward's
Derek Petersen	G	6'2	175	Freshman	Greenwood, IN	Hope College

=== Recruiting class ===
College recruiting information
Name	Hometown	School	Height	Weight	Commit date
Kaleb Edwards; PG	Fishers, IN	St. Theodore Guerin High School	6 ft 3 in (1.91 m)	175 lb (79 kg)	May 31, 2021
Kaleb Edwards; PG	Recruit ratings: (NR)				
Chuks Isitua; C	Lagos, Nigeria	Jack Yates Senior High School	6 ft 11 in (2.11 m)	220 lb (100 kg)	Jun 12, 2021
Chuks Isitua; C	Recruit ratings: Scout: Rivals: 247Sports: (NR)				
KJ Pruitt; PG	Lewisville, TX	Sunrise Christian Academy	6 ft 4 in (1.93 m)	203 lb (92 kg)	May 18, 2021
KJ Pruitt; PG	Recruit ratings: Scout: Rivals: 247Sports: (NR)				
Boston Stanton III; PG	Lewisville, TX	Denver East High School	6 ft 5 in (1.96 m)	190 lb (86 kg)	Aug 2, 2021
Boston Stanton III; PG	Recruit ratings: Scout: Rivals: 247Sports: (NR)				
Overall recruit ranking:
Note: In many cases, Scout, Rivals, 247Sports, On3, and ESPN may conflict in their listings of height and weight.; In these cases, the average was taken. ESPN grades are on a 100-point scale.; Sources: "2021 Team Ranking". Rivals.

== Roster ==
2021–22 IUPUI Jaguars men's basketball team
Players
Coaches

Pos.	#	Name	Height	Weight	Year	Hometown
G/F	0	B.J. Maxwell	6 ft 5 in (1.96 m)	200 lb (91 kg)	GS	Austin, Texas
G	1	KJ Pruitt (injured)	6 ft 4 in (1.93 m)	200 lb (91 kg)	Fr	Lewisville, Texas
G	2	Bobby Harvey (injured)	6 ft 3 in (1.91 m)	200 lb (91 kg)	Sr	Chicago, Illinois
G	4	Bakari Lastrap	6 ft 0 in (1.83 m)	170 lb (77 kg)	So	Houston, Texas
G	5	Nathan McClure	6 ft 4 in (1.93 m)	175 lb (79 kg)	Jr	Houston, Texas
G	10	Mike DePersia	5 ft 11 in (1.8 m)	175 lb (79 kg)	Jr	Cherry Hill, New Jersey
G	11	Kaleb Edwards (W) (redshirt)	6 ft 3 in (1.91 m)	175 lb (79 kg)	Fr	Fishers, Indiana
F	15	Zach Gunn (injured)	6 ft 6 in (1.98 m)	210 lb (95 kg)	GS	Fishers, Indiana
F	20	Derek Peterson (W) (redshirt)	6 ft 2 in (1.88 m)	175 lb (79 kg)	Fr	Greenwood, Indiana
F/C	23	Chuks Isitua	6 ft 11 in (2.11 m)	220 lb (100 kg)	Fr	Lagos, Nigeria
F	24	Jonah Carrasco (injured)	6 ft 9 in (2.06 m)	220 lb (100 kg)	Sr	Wichita, Kansas
G	25	Boston Stanton III	6 ft 5 in (1.96 m)	190 lb (86 kg)	Fr	Denver, Colorado
F	33	Dimitar Pandev (I)	6 ft 10 in (2.08 m)	225 lb (102 kg)	Sr	Strumica, North Macedonia

Head coach

- Matt Crenshaw (IUPUI)

Assistant coach(es)

- Antwain Banks (Kentucky State)
- Tommy Strine (Anderson (IN))
- Roy Hairston (Purdue)

Legend

- (C) Team captain
- (S) Suspended
- (I) Ineligible
- (W) Walk-on
- Injured
- Current redshirt

Roster

== Schedule and results ==
Date time, TV	Rank^{#}	Opponent^{#}	Result	Record	High points	High rebounds	High assists	Site (attendance) city, state
Exhibition
November 3, 2021*; 11:00 am, ESPN+		Anderson	W 74–60	–	20 – Seay	9 – McClure	7 – Stanton III	Indiana Farmers Coliseum (2,110); Indianapolis, IN
Regular season
November 9, 2021*; 6:45 pm, FS1		at Butler	L 47–56	0–1	14 – Maxwell	6 – Maxwell	3 – Stanton III	Hinkle Fieldhouse (7,134); Indianapolis, IN
November 11, 2021*; 7:00 pm, ESPN3		at Evansville	L 40–60	0–2	8 – Maxwell	4 – Maxwell	3 – DePersia	Ford Center (3,145); Evansville, IN
November 15, 2021*; 6:00 pm		vs. Denver; 210 San Antonio Shootout	L 47–63	0–3	14 – Maxwell	6 – Tied	4 – LaStrap	Convocation Center (197); San Antonio, TX
November 16, 2021*; 6:00 pm		vs. Texas A&M–Corpus Christi; 210 San Antonio Shootout	L 59–65	0–4	14 – Maxwell	7 – Tied	4 – Pruitt	Convocation Center (148); San Antonio, TX
November 17, 2021*; 5:30 pm, CUSA.tv		at UTSA; 210 San Antonio Shootout	L 57–60	0–5	13 – Maxwell	10 – Maxwell	4 – LaStrap	Convocation Center (678); San Antonio, TX
November 23, 2021*; 7:00 pm, ESPN+		Spalding	W 61–41	1–5	10 – LaStrap	7 – McClure	2 – Tied	Indiana Farmers Coliseum (603); Indianapolis, IN
December 2, 2021; 7:00 pm, ESPN+		Detroit Mercy	L 45–69	1–6 (0–1)	10 – Maxwell	4 – Tied	4 – LaStrap	Indiana Farmers Coliseum (892); Indianapolis, IN
December 4, 2021; 12:00 pm, ESPN+		Oakland	L 45–78	1–7 (0–2)	19 – Maxwell	9 – Maxwell	4 – Pruitt	Indiana Farmers Coliseum (898); Indianapolis, IN
December 10, 2021*; 7:00 pm, ESPN+		at Tennessee State	L 44–70	1–8	10 – Pruitt	5 – Tied	4 – McClure	Gentry Complex (334); Nashville, TN
December 16, 2021*; 7:00 pm, ESPN+		Chicago State	L 55–61	1–9	20 – Maxwell	5 – Isitua	2 – Tied	Indiana Farmers Coliseum (725); Indianapolis, IN
December 21, 2021*; 7:00 pm, ESPN+		Morehead State	L 52–80	1–10	17 – Seay	5 – Carrasco	3 – LaStrap	Indiana Farmers Coliseum (728); Indianapolis, IN
December 30, 2021; 7:00 pm, ESPN+		Cleveland State	Canceled due to COVID-19 issues at IUPUI					Indiana Farmers Coliseum; Indianapolis, IN
January 1, 2022; 7:00 pm, ESPN+		Purdue Fort Wayne	Canceled due to COVID-19 issues at IUPUI					Indiana Farmers Coliseum; Indianapolis, IN
January 6, 2022; 7:00 pm, ESPN+		at Northern Kentucky	Canceled due to COVID-19 issues at both programs					BB&T Arena; Highland Heights, KY
January 8, 2022; 2:00 pm, ESPN+		Wright State	L 58–72	1–11 (0–3)	16 – Seay	7 – Maxwell	5 – LaStrap	Nutter Center (2,967); Dayton, OH
January 10, 2022; 7:00 pm, ESPN+		UIC	L 65–67	1–12 (0–4)	16 – LaStrap	6 – McClure	3 – Tied	Indiana Farmers Coliseum (613); Indianapolis, IN
January 13, 2022; 8:00 pm, ESPN+		at Green Bay	L 54–69	1–13 (0–5)	18 – Maxwell	9 – Seay	5 – DePersia	Kress Events Center (1,342); Green Bay, WI
January 15, 2022; 3:00 pm, ESPN+		at Milwaukee	L 54–89	1–14 (0–6)	9 – Tied	6 – McClure	3 – Tied	UW–Milwaukee Panther Arena (2,091); Milwaukee, WI
January 18, 2022*; 7:00 p.m., BTN		at No. 19 Ohio State	L 37–83	1–15	12 – LaStrap	6 – DePersia	2 – Tied	Value City Arena (10,666); Columbus, OH
January 20, 2022; 7:00 pm, ESPN+		Wright State	L 45–73	1–16 (0–7)	10 – LaStrap	5 – Maxwell	2 – Tied	Indiana Farmers Coliseum (692); Indianapolis, IN
January 22, 2022; 12:00 pm, ESPN+		Northern Kentucky	L 41–60	1–17 (0–8)	11 – LaStrap	6 – DePersia	5 – DePersia	Indiana Farmers Coliseum (795); Indianapolis, IN
January 24, 2022; 7:00 pm		Brescia	Canceled					IUPUI Gymnasium; Indianapolis, IN
January 27, 2022; 7:00 pm, ESPN+		at Oakland	Canceled due to COVID-19 issues at IUPUI					Athletics Center O'rena; Auburn Hills, MI
January 29, 2022; 1:00 pm, ESPN+		at Detroit Mercy	Canceled due to COVID-19 issues at IUPUI					Calihan Hall; Detroit, MI
January 31, 2022; 12:00 pm, ESPN+		East–West	W 75–59	2–17	19 – LaStrap	14 – McClure	5 – DePersia	IUPUI Gymnasium (163); Indianapolis, IN
February 3, 2022; 7:00 pm, ESPN+		Youngstown State	L 55–61	2–18 (0–9)	22 – Maxwell	10 – McClure	4 – LaStrap	Indiana Farmers Coliseum (420); Indianapolis, IN
February 5, 2022; 12:00 pm, ESPN+		Robert Morris	L 55–61	2–19 (0–10)	16 – Maxwell	12 – Isitua	6 – DePersia	Indiana Farmers Coliseum (582); Indianapolis, IN
February 10, 2022; 7:00 pm, ESPN+		at Purdue Fort Wayne	L 57–72	2–20 (0–11)	19 – Maxwell	6 – Isitua	6 – LaStrap	Allen County War Memorial Coliseum (1,188); Fort Wayne, IN
February 12, 2022; 3:00 pm, ESPN+		at Cleveland State	L 45–83	2–21 (0–12)	17 – Maxwell	11 – Maxwell	3 – DePersia	Wolstein Center (4,002); Cleveland, OH
February 14, 2022; 8:00 pm, ESPN+		at UIC	L 54–57	2–22 (0–13)	14 – Maxwell	10 – Isitua	4 – DePersia	Credit Union 1 Arena (1,242); Chicago, IL
February 17, 2022; 7:00 pm, ESPN+		at Robert Morris	W 66–56	3–22 (1–13)	18 – Maxwell	7 – Isitua	5 – LaStrap	UPMC Events Center (1,154); Moon, PA
February 19, 2022; 7:00 pm, ESPN+		at Youngstown State	L 61–74	3–23 (1–14)	14 – Tied	7 – Isitua	5 – LaStrap	Beeghly Center (2,110); Youngstown, OH
February 24, 2022; 8:00 pm, ESPN+		Milwaukee	L 54–66	3–24 (1–15)	14 – Maxwell	10 – Isitua	5 – DePersia	Indiana Farmers Coliseum (603); Indianapolis, IN
February 26, 2022; 4:45 pm, ESPN+		Green Bay	L 41–67	3–25 (1–16)	12 – McClure	12 – McClure	5 – DePersia	IUPUI Gymnasium (982); Indianapolis, IN
Horizon League tournament
March 1, 2022*; 7:00 pm, ESPN+	(12)	at (5) Oakland; First round	L 58–69	3–26	15 – Maxwell	14 – Isitua	9 – DePersia	Athletics Center O'rena (1,728); Rochester, MI
*Non-conference game. ^{#}Rankings from AP Poll. (#) Tournament seedings in parentheses. All times are in Central.
