= 2022 Horizon League men's basketball tournament =

American college basketball postseason tournament

- Classification: Division I
- Season: 2021–22
- Teams: 12
- Site: Campus sites (first round and quarterfinals); Indiana Farmers Coliseum; Indianapolis, Indiana (Semifinals and Finals)
- Champions: Wright State (3rd title)
- Winning coach: Scott Nagy (2nd title)
- MVP: Grant Basile (Wright State)
- Television: ESPN+, ESPNU, ESPN2, ESPN

2021–22 Horizon League men's basketball standings
	Conf.				Overall
Team	W		L	PCT	W		L	PCT
Cleveland State	15	–	6	.714	20	–	11	.645
Purdue Fort Wayne	15	–	6	.714	21	–	12	.636
Northern Kentucky	14	–	6	.700	20	–	12	.625
Wright State †	15	–	7	.682	22	–	14	.611
Oakland	12	–	7	.632	20	–	12	.625
Detroit Mercy	10	–	7	.588	14	–	15	.483
Youngstown State	12	–	9	.571	19	–	15	.559
UIC	9	–	10	.474	14	–	16	.467
Milwaukee	8	–	14	.364	10	–	22	.313
Robert Morris	5	–	16	.238	8	–	23	.258
Green Bay	4	–	16	.200	5	–	25	.167
IUPUI	1	–	16	.059	3	–	26	.103
† 2022 Horizon League tournament winner

The 2022 Horizon League men's basketball tournament was the final event of the 2021–22 men's basketball season for the Horizon League. It took place from March 1 to 8, 2022. First-round and quarterfinal games were played at the home courts of the higher seeds, and all the remaining games contested at Indiana Farmers Coliseum in Indianapolis. The winner, Wright State, received the conference's automatic berth into the NCAA tournament.

== Seeds ==
All of the teams participated in the tournament with the top-four teams receiving byes to the quarterfinals. Tiebreakers used were 1) Head-to-head results, 2) comparison of records against individual teams in the conference starting with the top-ranked team and working down and 3) NCAA NET rankings on the first available report after the regular season is complete. Cleveland State got the #1 seed over Purdue Fort Wayne due to a better head-to-head record.

Seed	School	Conf	NET ranking (February 28, 2021)
1	Cleveland State	15−6	176th
2	Purdue Fort Wayne	15−6	228th
3	Northern Kentucky	14−6	204th
4	Wright State	15−7	208th
5	Oakland	12−7	153rd
6	Detroit Mercy	10−7	231st
7	Youngstown State	12−9	244th
8	UIC	9−10	289th
9	Milwaukee	8−14	330th
10	Robert Morris	5−16	331st
11	Green Bay	4−16	344th
12	IUPUI	1−16	358th

== Schedule ==
Game	Time	Matchup	Score	Television
First Round – March 1
1	7:00 pm	No. 12 IUPUI at No. 5 Oakland	58–69	ESPN+
2	7:00 pm	No. 11 Green Bay at No. 6 Detroit Mercy	62–79	ESPN+
3	7:00 pm	No. 10 Robert Morris at No. 7 Youngstown State	77–73	ESPN+
4	7:00 pm	No. 8 UIC* at No. 9 Milwaukee	80–69	ESPN+
Quarterfinals – Thursday, March 3
5	7:00 pm	No. 10 Robert Morris at No. 1 Cleveland State	67–83	ESPN+
6	7:00 pm	No. 5 Oakland at No. 4 Wright State	63–75	ESPN+
7	7:00 pm	No. 8 UIC at No. 2 Purdue Fort Wayne	72–78	ESPN+
8	7:00 pm	No. 6 Detroit Mercy at No. 3 Northern Kentucky	59–77	ESPN+
Semifinals – Monday, March 7 at Indiana Farmers Coliseum, Indianapolis, IN
9	7:00 pm	No. 4 Wright State vs. No. 1 Cleveland State	82–67	ESPNU
10	9:30 pm	No. 3 Northern Kentucky vs. No. 2 Purdue Fort Wayne	57–43	ESPN2
Championship – Tuesday, March 8 at Indiana Farmers Coliseum, Indianapolis, IN
11	7:00 pm	No. 4 Wright State vs. No. 3 Northern Kentucky	72–71	ESPN
All game times Eastern. Rankings denote tournament seed

*Note:Milwaukee will host UIC in first round, As UIC waived right to host championship events

== Bracket ==
The Horizon League does not use a fixed bracket tournament system, and pairings are re-seeded after the first and second rounds.

First round Tuesday, March 1
5	Oakland	70
12	IUPUI	58
6	Detroit	79
11	Green Bay	62
7	Youngstown State	73
10	Robert Morris	77
8	UIC	80
9	Milwaukee	69

Quarterfinals; Thursday, March 3
1	Cleveland State	83
10	Robert Morris	67
4	Wright State	75
5	Oakland	63
3	Northern Kentucky	77
6	Detroit	59
2	Purdue Fort Wayne	78
8	UIC	72

Semifinals; Monday, March 7
1	Cleveland State	67
4	Wright State	82
3	Northern Kentucky	57
2	Purdue Fort Wayne	43

Championship; Tuesday, March 8
4	Wright State	72
3	Northern Kentucky	71
