= 2021–22 Robert Morris Colonials men's basketball team =

American college basketball season

2021–22 Robert Morris Colonials men's basketball
- Conference: Horizon League
- Record: 8–24 (5–16 Horizon)
- Head coach: Andrew Toole (12th season)
- Associate head coach: Mike Iuzzolino
- Assistant coaches: Vince Johnson; Dave Fedor
- Home arena: UPMC Events Center

2021–22 Horizon League men's basketball standings
	Conf.				Overall
Team	W		L	PCT	W		L	PCT
Cleveland State	15	–	6	.714	20	–	11	.645
Purdue Fort Wayne	15	–	6	.714	21	–	12	.636
Northern Kentucky	14	–	6	.700	20	–	12	.625
Wright State †	15	–	7	.682	22	–	14	.611
Oakland	12	–	7	.632	20	–	12	.625
Detroit Mercy	10	–	7	.588	14	–	15	.483
Youngstown State	12	–	9	.571	19	–	15	.559
UIC	9	–	10	.474	14	–	16	.467
Milwaukee	8	–	14	.364	10	–	22	.313
Robert Morris	5	–	16	.238	8	–	23	.258
Green Bay	4	–	16	.200	5	–	25	.167
IUPUI	1	–	16	.059	3	–	26	.103
† 2022 Horizon League tournament winner

The 2021–22 Robert Morris Colonials men's basketball team represented Robert Morris University in the 2021–22 NCAA Division I men's basketball season. The Colonials, led by 12th-year head coach Andrew Toole, played their home games at the UPMC Events Center in Moon Township, Pennsylvania as members of the Horizon League.

== Previous season ==
The Colonials finished the 2020–21 season 4–15, 3–12 in Horizon League play to finish in last place. In the Horizon League tournament, they lost to Detroit Mercy in the first round.

== Roster ==
2021–22 Robert Morris Colonials men's basketball team
Players
Coaches

Pos.	#	Name	Height	Weight	Year	Previous school	Hometown
G	0	Kam Farris	6 ft 3 in (1.91 m)	165 lb (75 kg)	So	Redemption Christian Academy	Burlington, VT
G	1	Michael Green III	5 ft 11 in (1.8 m)	150 lb (68 kg)	Jr	Bryant	Bronx, NY
F	2	Kahliel Spear	6 ft 7 in (2.01 m)	220 lb (100 kg)	Sr	Bucknell	The Colony, TX
G	3	Rasheem Dunn	6 ft 2 in (1.88 m)	190 lb (86 kg)	GS	St. John's	Brooklyn, NY
F	4	Mattia Acunzo	6 ft 8 in (2.03 m)	225 lb (102 kg)	So	Toledo	Sardinia, Italy
G	5	Enoch Cheeks	6 ft 3 in (1.91 m)	190 lb (86 kg)	So	Putnam Science Academy	Providence, RI
F	11	Jaron Williams	6 ft 6 in (1.98 m)	210 lb (95 kg)	Sr	UT Martin	Rock Hill, SC
G	12	Chase Cook	5 ft 10 in (1.78 m)	170 lb (77 kg)	So	Calvin Coolidge	Washington, D.C.
G	13	Tristian Jeffries	6 ft 6 in (1.98 m)	185 lb (84 kg)	Fr	St. Thomas Aquinas	Jersey City, NJ
F	21	Matt Mayers	6 ft 8 in (2.03 m)	210 lb (95 kg)	Jr	Hutchinson CC	Hastings-on-Hudson, NY
F	23	Brandon Stone	6 ft 11 in (2.11 m)	200 lb (91 kg)	Jr	La Salle	Alverton, PA
F	35	Justin Winston	6 ft 8 in (2.03 m)	220 lb (100 kg)	Jr	St. Bonaventure	West Orange, NJ

Head coach

- Andrew Toole (Pennsylvania)

Assistant coach(es)

- Mike Iuzzolino (Saint Francis (PA))
- Vince Johnson (St. Thomas Aquinas)
- Dave Fedor (Rutgers)

Legend

- (C) Team captain
- (S) Suspended
- (I) Ineligible
- (W) Walk-on
- Injured
- Current redshirt

Roster
Last update: November 30, 2021

== Schedule and results ==
Date time, TV	Rank^{#}	Opponent^{#}	Result	Record	Site (attendance) city, state
Regular season
November 10, 2021*; 7:00 pm, ESPN+		at UCF	L 59–69	0–1	Addition Financial Arena (4,869); Orlando, FL
November 12, 2021*; 7:00 pm, SECN		at No. 10 Kentucky; Kentucky Classic	L 60–100	0–2	Rupp Arena (18,454); Lexington, KY
November 15, 2021*; 7:00 pm, ESPN3		at Ohio; Kentucky Classic	L 71–85	0–3	Convocation Center (6,180); Athens, OH
November 19, 2021*; 7:00 pm, ESPN+		Mount St. Mary's; Kentucky Classic	L 70–74 ^{OT}	0–4	UPMC Events Center (1,589); Moon Township, PA
November 27, 2021*; 2:00 pm, ESPN+		at Davidson	L 70–88	0–5	John M. Belk Arena (2,724); Davidson, NC
December 2, 2021; 8:00 pm, ESPN+		at Green Bay	L 58-70	0–6 (0–1)	Resch Center (1,989); Ashwaubenon, WI
December 4, 2021; 12:00 pm, ESPNU		at Milwaukee	L 69-77	0–7 (0–2)	UW–Milwaukee Panther Arena (2,243); Milwaukee, WI
December 8, 2021*; 7:00 pm, ESPN+		Lancaster Bible	W 99–51	1–7	UPMC Events Center (717); Moon Township, PA
December 11, 2021*; 7:00 pm, ESPN+		Florida Gulf Coast	L 74–85	1–8	UPMC Events Center (1,171); Moon Township, PA
December 19, 2021*; 2:00 pm, ESPN3		at Bowling Green	L 74–100	1–9	Stroh Center (1,964); Bowling Green, OH
December 22, 2021*; 7:00 pm, NEC Front Row		at Saint Francis (PA)	W 75–67	2–9	DeGol Arena (224); Loretto, PA
December 30, 2021; 7:00 pm, ESPN+		at Oakland	L 61–79	2–10 (0–3)	Athletics Center O'rena (2,059); Auburn Hills, MI
January 1, 2022; 3:00 pm, ESPN+		at Detroit Mercy	Canceled due to COVID-19 protocols		Calihan Hall; Detroit, MI
January 5, 2022; 7:00 pm, ESPN+		Youngstown State	L 60–64	2–11 (0–4)	UPMC Events Center (353); Moon Township, PA
January 7, 2022; 7:00 pm, ESPN+		Cleveland State	L 77–78	2–12 (0–5)	UPMC Events Center (542); Moon Township, PA
January 9, 2022; 1:00 pm, ESPN+		Purdue Fort Wayne	L 70–76	2–13 (0–6)	UPMC Events Center (572); Moon Township, PA
January 13, 2022; 7:00 pm, ESPN+		Wright State	L 73–75	2–14 (0–7)	UPMC Events Center (743); Moon Township, PA
January 15, 2022; 7:00 pm, ESPN+		Northern Kentucky	W 74–64	3–14 (1–7)	UPMC Events Center (703); Moon Township, PA
January 21, 2022; 7:00 pm, ESPN+		at Purdue Fort Wayne	L 62–86	3–15 (1–8)	Allen County War Memorial Coliseum (1,716); Fort Wayne, IN
January 23, 2022; 3:00 pm, ESPN+		at Cleveland State	L 68–75	3–16 (1–9)	Wolstein Center (1,694); Cleveland, OH
January 27, 2022; 7:00 pm, ESPN+		Milwaukee	W 77–53	4–16 (2–9)	UPMC Events Center (852); Moon Township, PA
January 29, 2022; 7:00 pm, ESPN+		Green Bay	W 62–60	5–16 (3–9)	UPMC Events Center (902); Moon Township, PA
February 3, 2022; 8:00 pm, ESPN+		at UIC	L 75–80	5–17 (3–10)	Credit Union 1 Arena (1,725); Chicago, IL
February 5, 2022; 12:00 pm, ESPN+		at IUPUI	W 66–49	6–17 (4–10)	Indiana Farmers Coliseum (582); Indianapolis, IN
February 9, 2022; 7:00 pm, ESPN+		Detroit Mercy	L 62–79	6–18 (4–11)	UPMC Events Center (703); Moon Township, PA
February 11, 2022; 7:00 pm, ESPN+		Oakland	L 68–71	6–19 (4–12)	UPMC Events Center (872); Moon Township, PA
February 13, 2022; 12:00 pm, ESPN+		at Youngstown State	W 73–68	7–19 (5–12)	Beeghly Center (1,241); Youngstown, OH
February 17, 2022; 7:00 pm, ESPN+		IUPUI	L 56–66	7–20 (5–13)	UPMC Events Center (1,154); Moon Township, PA
February 19, 2022; 7:00 pm, ESPN+		UIC	L 88–96 ^{OT}	7–21 (5–14)	UPMC Events Center (1,601); Moon Township, PA
February 24, 2022; 7:00 pm, ESPN+		at Northern Kentucky	L 64–78	7–22 (5–15)	BB&T Arena (3,300); Highland Heights, KY
February 26, 2022; 7:00 pm, ESPN+		at Wright State	L 61–71	7–23 (5–16)	Nutter Center (3,796); Dayton, OH
Horizon League tournament
March 1, 2022*; 7:00 pm, ESPN+	(10)	at (7) Youngstown State; First round	W 77–73	8–23	Beeghly Center (1,613); Youngstown, OH
March 3, 2022*; 7:00 pm, ESPN+	(10)	at (1) Cleveland State; Quarterfinals	L 67–83	8–24	Wolstein Center (0); Cleveland, OH
*Non-conference game. ^{#}Rankings from AP Poll. (#) Tournament seedings in parentheses. All times are in Eastern.
