= 2021–22 Green Bay Phoenix men's basketball team =

American college basketball season

2021–22 Green Bay Phoenix men's basketball
- Conference: Horizon League
- Record: 5–25 (4–16 Horizon)
- Head coach: Will Ryan (2nd season)
- Assistant coaches: Jared Swanson; Freddie Owens; Brandon Pritzl
- Home arena: Resch Center; Kress Events Center

2021–22 Horizon League men's basketball standings
	Conf.				Overall
Team	W		L	PCT	W		L	PCT
Cleveland State	15	–	6	.714	20	–	11	.645
Purdue Fort Wayne	15	–	6	.714	21	–	12	.636
Northern Kentucky	14	–	6	.700	20	–	12	.625
Wright State †	15	–	7	.682	22	–	14	.611
Oakland	12	–	7	.632	20	–	12	.625
Detroit Mercy	10	–	7	.588	14	–	15	.483
Youngstown State	12	–	9	.571	19	–	15	.559
UIC	9	–	10	.474	14	–	16	.467
Milwaukee	8	–	14	.364	10	–	22	.313
Robert Morris	5	–	16	.238	8	–	23	.258
Green Bay	4	–	16	.200	5	–	25	.167
IUPUI	1	–	16	.059	3	–	26	.103
† 2022 Horizon League tournament winner

The 2021–22 Green Bay Phoenix men's basketball team represented the University of Wisconsin–Green Bay in the 2021–22 NCAA Division I men's basketball season. The Phoenix, led by second-year head coach Will Ryan, split their home games between the Resch Center in Ashwaubenon, Wisconsin and the Kress Events Center in Green Bay, Wisconsin. The competed as members of the Horizon League. They finished the season 5–25, 4–16 in Horizon League play to finish in 11th place. They lost in the first round of the Horizon League Tournament to Detroit Mercy.

== Previous season ==
In a season limited due to the ongoing COVID-19 pandemic, the Phoenix finished the 2020–21 season 8–17, 8–12 in Horizon League play to finish in ninth place. As the No. 7 seed in the Horizon League tournament, they lost to Purdue Fort Wayne in the first round.

== Roster ==
2021–22 Green Bay Phoenix men's basketball team
Players
Coaches

Pos.	#	Name	Height	Weight	Year	Hometown
G	0	Donavan Moore	6 ft 3 in (1.91 m)	180 lb (82 kg)	So	Hillsboro, Illinois
G	1	Mitch Listau	6 ft 4 in (1.93 m)	—	RS So	Waunakee, Wisconsin
G	2	Kamari McGee	6 ft 0 in (1.83 m)	—	Fr	Racine, Wisconsin
F	3	Japannah Kellogg III	6 ft 8 in (2.03 m)	190 lb (86 kg)	RS Fr	Ames, Iowa
G	5	Lucas Stieber	6 ft 3 in (1.91 m)	185 lb (84 kg)	RS Fr	Green Bay, Wisconsin
F	11	Cade Meyer	6 ft 8 in (2.03 m)	—	Fr	Monroe, Wisconsin
F	12	Cem Kirciman	6 ft 8 in (2.03 m)	220 lb (100 kg)	Fr	Bursa, Turkey
F	13	Ryan Claflin	6 ft 6 in (1.98 m)	190 lb (86 kg)	Fr	Brussels, Wisconsin
G	14	Randy Tucker	6 ft 4 in (1.93 m)	—	RS So	Rock Island, Illinois
G	15	Donovan Ivory	6 ft 6 in (1.98 m)	—	RS So	Kaukauna, Wisconsin
F	21	Tutu Majok	6 ft 9 in (2.06 m)	—	So	Cairo, Egypt
F	22	Brayden Dailey	6 ft 7 in (2.01 m)	—	Fr	Cuba City, Wisconsin
F	23	Emmanuel Ansong	6 ft 4 in (1.93 m)	195 lb (88 kg)	Jr	Bordentown, New Jersey
G	55	Nate Jenkins	6 ft 2 in (1.88 m)	—	So	Delafield, Wisconsin

Head coach

- Will Ryan (Milwaukee)

Assistant coach(es)

- Jared Swanson (Concordia-Moorhead)
- Freddie Owens (Wisconsin)
- Brandon Pritzl (Hillsdale)

Legend

- (C) Team captain
- (S) Suspended
- (I) Ineligible
- (W) Walk-on
- Injured
- Current redshirt

Roster
Last update: December 23, 2021

== Schedule and results ==
Date time, TV	Rank^{#}	Opponent^{#}	Result	Record	Site (attendance) city, state
Exhibition
October 29, 2021*; 6:00 pm		St. Norbert	W 80–45	–	Resch Center; Ashwaubenon, WI
Regular season
November 9, 2021*; 7:00 pm, ESPN+		Indiana State	L 77–81	0–1	Kress Events Center (1,834); Green Bay, WI
November 12, 2021*; 7:00 pm, BTN+		at Wisconsin	L 34–72	0–2	Kohl Center (16,005); Madison, WI
November 18, 2021*; 2:00 pm, CBSSN		vs. UNC Greensboro; Jersey Mike's Classic	L 58–60	0–3	McArthur Center (143); St. Petersburg, FL
November 19, 2021*; 7:00 pm, Pluto TV		vs. FIU; Jersey Mike's Classic	L 60–63	0–4	McArthur Center (345); St. Petersburg, FL
November 21, 2021*; 11:00 am, Pluto TV		vs. Weber State; Jersey Mike's Classic	L 58–68	0–5	McArthur Center (301); St. Petersburg, FL
November 27, 2021*; 6:00 pm, ESPN+		UW–Superior	W 77–48	1–5	Kress Events Center (1,480); Green Bay, WI
December 2, 2021; 7:00 pm, ESPN+		Robert Morris	W 70–58	2–5 (1–0)	Resch Center (1,989); Ashwaubenon, WI
December 4, 2021; 6:00 pm, ESPN+		Youngstown State	L 58–82	2–6 (1–1)	Kress Events Center (1,685); Green Bay, WI
December 10, 2021*; 7:00 pm, Roo Sports Network		at Kansas City	L 55–64	2–7	Swinney Recreation Center (1,052); Kansas City, MO
December 12, 2021*; 4:00 pm, ESPN+		at Kansas State	L 64–82	2–8	Bramlage Coliseum (5,437); Manhattan, KS
December 22, 2021*; 4:00 pm, BTN+		at Minnesota	L 56–72	2–9	Williams Arena (10,302); Minneapolis, MN
December 30, 2021; 6:00 pm, ESPN+		at Northern Kentucky	L 74–79	2–10 (1–2)	BB&T Arena (2,384); Highland Heights, KY
January 1, 2022; 1:00 pm, ESPN+		at Wright State	L 69–72	2–11 (1–3)	Nutter Center (2,677); Dayton, OH
January 5, 2022; 7:00 pm, ESPN+		Milwaukee	L 49-63	2–12 (1–4)	Resch Center (2,149); Ashwaubenon, WI
January 7, 2022; 6:00 pm, ESPN+		at Oakland	Canceled due to COVID-19 protocols; Declared a no contest		Athletics Center O'rena; Auburn Hills, MI
January 9, 2022; 12:00 pm, ESPN+		at Detroit Mercy	Canceled due to COVID-19 protocols; Declared a no contest		Calihan Hall; Detroit, MI
January 13, 2022; 7:00 pm, ESPN+		IUPUI	W 69–54	3–12 (2–4)	Resch Center (1,342); Ashwaubenon, WI
January 15, 2022; 6:00 pm, ESPN+		UIC	L 63–80	3–13 (2–5)	Resch Center (1,721); Ashwaubenon, WI
January 20, 2022; 7:00 pm, ESPN+		Detroit Mercy	W 70–63	4–13 (3–5)	Resch Center (1,387); Ashwaubenon, WI
January 22, 2022; 6:00 pm, ESPN+		Oakland	L 61–68	4–14 (3–6)	Resch Center (1,327); Ashwaubenon, WI
January 27, 2022; 6:00 pm, ESPN+		at Youngstown State	L 50–63	4–15 (3–7)	Beeghly Center (1,501); Youngstown, OH
January 29, 2022; 6:00 pm, ESPN+		at Robert Morris	L 60–62	4–16 (3–8)	UPMC Events Center (902); Moon Township, PA
February 4, 2022; 6:00 pm, ESPN+		at Cleveland State	L 69–85	4–17 (3–9)	Wolstein Center (2,111); Cleveland, OH
February 6, 2022; 1:00 pm, ESPN+		at Purdue Fort Wayne	L 55–71	4–18 (3–10)	Allen County War Memorial Coliseum (1,163); Fort Wayne, IN
February 9, 2022; 7:00 pm, ESPN+		Wright State	L 62–79	4–19 (3–11)	Resch Center (1,621); Ashwaubenon, WI
February 11, 2022; 7:00 pm, ESPN+		Northern Kentucky	L 62–71	4–20 (3–12)	Kress Events Center (1,735); Green Bay, WI
February 13, 2022; 1:00 pm, ESPN+		at Milwaukee	L 44–54	4–21 (3–13)	UW–Milwaukee Panther Arena (2,014); Milwaukee, WI
February 18, 2022; 7:00 pm, ESPN+		Purdue Fort Wayne	L 55–74	4–22 (3–14)	Kress Events Center (1,664); Green Bay, WI
February 20, 2022; 2:00 pm, ESPN+		Cleveland State	L 67–79	4–23 (3–15)	Kress Events Center (1,845); Green Bay, WI
February 24, 2022; 7:00 pm, ESPN+		at UIC	L 77–81	4–24 (3–16)	Credit Union 1 Arena (3,257); Chicago, IL
February 26, 2022; 3:45 pm, ESPN+		at IUPUI	W 67–41	5–24 (4–16)	Indiana Farmers Coliseum (982); Indianapolis, IN
Horizon League tournament
March 1, 2022*; 6:00 pm, ESPN+	(11)	at (6) Detroit Mercy; First round	L 62–79	5–25	Calihan Hall (1,817); Detroit, MI
*Non-conference game. ^{#}Rankings from AP Poll. (#) Tournament seedings in parentheses. All times are in Central.
