= 2021–22 Oakland Golden Grizzlies men's basketball team =

American college basketball season

2021–22 Oakland Golden Grizzlies men's basketball

Gulf Coast Showcase champions
- Conference: Horizon League
- Record: 20–12 (12–7 Horizon)
- Head coach: Greg Kampe (38th season)
- Associate head coach: Jeff Smith
- Assistant coaches: Tony Jones; Mychal Covington
- Home arena: Athletics Center O'rena

2021–22 Horizon League men's basketball standings
	Conf.				Overall
Team	W		L	PCT	W		L	PCT
Cleveland State	15	–	6	.714	20	–	11	.645
Purdue Fort Wayne	15	–	6	.714	21	–	12	.636
Northern Kentucky	14	–	6	.700	20	–	12	.625
Wright State †	15	–	7	.682	22	–	14	.611
Oakland	12	–	7	.632	20	–	12	.625
Detroit Mercy	10	–	7	.588	14	–	15	.483
Youngstown State	12	–	9	.571	19	–	15	.559
UIC	9	–	10	.474	14	–	16	.467
Milwaukee	8	–	14	.364	10	–	22	.313
Robert Morris	5	–	16	.238	8	–	23	.258
Green Bay	4	–	16	.200	5	–	25	.167
IUPUI	1	–	16	.059	3	–	26	.103
† 2022 Horizon League tournament winner

The 2021–22 Oakland Golden Grizzlies men's basketball team represented Oakland University in the 2021–22 NCAA Division I men's basketball season. The Golden Grizzlies, led by 38th-year head coach Greg Kampe, played their home games at the Athletics Center O'rena in Auburn Hills, Michigan as members of the Horizon League. They finished the season 20–12, 12–7 in Horizon League play to finish in fifth place. They defeated IUPUI in the first round of the Horizon League tournament before losing to Wright State in the quarterfinals. They declined an invitation to The Basketball Classic postseason tournament due to injuries to several players.

== Previous season ==
In a season limited due to the ongoing COVID-19 pandemic, the Golden Grizzlies finished the 2020–21 season 12–18, 10–10 in Horizon League play to finish in fifth place. They defeated Youngstown State and Northern Kentucky in the Horizon League tournament before losing to Cleveland State in the championship game.

== Roster ==
2021–22 Oakland Golden Grizzlies men's basketball team
Players
Coaches

Pos.	#	Name	Height	Weight	Year	Hometown
G	0	Zion Young	6 ft 3 in (1.91 m)	220 lb (100 kg)	Jr	Chicago, Illinois
F	1	Jamal Cain	6 ft 7 in (2.01 m)	191 lb (87 kg)	GS	Pontiac, Michigan
F	2	Will Shepherd	6 ft 8 in (2.03 m)	226 lb (103 kg)	Fr	Dallas, Texas
F	3	Micah Parrish	6 ft 6 in (1.98 m)	194 lb (88 kg)	Fr	Detroit, Michigan
F	4	Trey Townsend	6 ft 6 in (1.98 m)	222 lb (101 kg)	Fr	Oxford, Michigan
G	5	Emmanuel Newsome	6 ft 0 in (1.83 m)	175 lb (79 kg)	So	Boca Raton, Florida
G	11	Blake Lampman	6 ft 3 in (1.91 m)	184 lb (83 kg)	So	Haslett, Michigan
G	12	Mason Gibson	5 ft 11 in (1.8 m)	172 lb (78 kg)	Fr	Allen, Texas
G	13	Osei Price	6 ft 5 in (1.96 m)	182 lb (83 kg)	Fr	Upper Marlboro, Maryland
G	14	Brody Parker	6 ft 0 in (1.83 m)	170 lb (77 kg)	Fr	Troy, Michigan
G	20	Ty Wyman	6 ft 5 in (1.96 m)	205 lb (93 kg)	Fr	Blissfield, Michigan
G	22	Peyton Mele	6 ft 2 in (1.88 m)	175 lb (79 kg)	Fr	Hermitage, Pennsylvania
F	23	Chris Conway	6 ft 9 in (2.06 m)	226 lb (103 kg)	Fr	Naperville, Illinois
G	24	Darius Sherman	6 ft 2 in (1.88 m)	165 lb (75 kg)	Fr	Monrovia, Liberia
G	34	Jalen Moore	5 ft 11 in (1.8 m)	170 lb (77 kg)	Jr	Cloverdale, Indiana

Head coach

- Greg Kampe (Bowling Green)

Assistant coach(es)

- Jeff Smith (Southeast Missouri State)
- Tony Jones (Fisk)
- Mychal Covington (Oakland)

Legend

- (C) Team captain
- (S) Suspended
- (I) Ineligible
- (W) Walk-on
- Injured
- Current redshirt

Roster
Last update: January 24, 2022

== Schedule and results ==
Date time, TV	Rank^{#}	Opponent^{#}	Result	Record	Site (attendance) city, state
Exhibition
October 28, 2021*; 7:00 pm, ESPN+		Eastern Michigan	L 69–74	–	Athletics Center O'rena (1,112); Rochester, MI
November 5, 2021*; 7:00 pm		Lake Superior State	W 91–81	–	Athletics Center O'rena (1,892); Rochester, MI
Regular season
November 9, 2021*; 7:00 pm, Big 12 Now		at West Virginia	L 53–60	0–1	WVU Coliseum (9,408); Morgantown, WV
November 12, 2021*; 8:00 pm, ESPN+		at Oklahoma State	W 56–55	1–1	Gallagher-Iba Arena (8,729); Stillwater, OK
November 17, 2021*; 7:00 pm, ESPN+		Toledo	W 80–59	2–1	Athletics Center O'rena (3,616); Rochester, MI
November 19, 2021*; 8:00 pm, SECN+		at No. 14 Alabama	L 59–86	2–2	Coleman Coliseum (10,330); Tuscaloosa, AL
November 22, 2021*; 1:30 pm, FloHoops		vs. Vermont; Gulf Coast Showcase quarterfinal	W 63–61	3–2	Hertz Arena (415); Estero, FL
November 23, 2021*; 5:00 pm, FloHoops		vs. Rice; Gulf Coast Showcase semifinal	W 76–73	4–2	Hertz Arena (270); Estero, FL
November 24, 2021*; 7:30 pm, FloHoops		vs. Delaware; Gulf Coast Showcase championship	W 81–73	5–2	Hertz Arena (237); Estero, FL
December 2, 2021; 8:00 pm, ESPN+		at UIC	W 81–77	6–2 (1–0)	Credit Union 1 Arena (1,724); Chicago, IL
December 4, 2021; 12:00 pm, ESPN+		at IUPUI	W 78–45	7–2 (2–0)	Indiana Farmers Coliseum (898); Indianapolis, IN
December 7, 2021*; 7:00 pm, ESPN3		at Bowling Green	L 72–73	7–3	Stroh Center (2,060); Bowling Green, OH
December 21, 2021*; 7:30 pm, WMYD/ESPN+		vs. No. 11 Michigan State; Detroit Showcase	L 78–90	7–4	Little Caesars Arena (16,837); Detroit, MI
December 30, 2021; 7:00 pm, ESPN+		Robert Morris	W 79–61	8–4 (3–0)	Athletics Center O'rena (2,059); Rochester, MI
January 1, 2022; 3:00 pm, ESPN+		Youngstown State	W 87–72	9–4 (4–0)	Athletics Center O'rena (2,034); Rochester, MI
January 5, 2022; 7:00 pm, ESPN+		at Detroit Mercy	Canceled due to COVID-19 protocols		Calihan Hall; Detroit, MI
January 7, 2022; 7:00 pm, ESPN+		Green Bay	Canceled due to COVID-19 protocols		Athletics Center O'rena; Rochester, MI
January 7, 2022*; 7:00 pm, ESPN+		Ohio Christian	W 108–40	10–4	Athletics Center O'rena (2,381); Rochester, MI
January 9, 2022; 4:00 pm, ESPN+		Milwaukee	W 86–65	11–4 (5–0)	Athletics Center O'rena (2,793); Rochester, MI
January 13, 2022; 7:00 pm, ESPN+		at Cleveland State	W 70–65	12–4 (6–0)	Wolstein Center (2,312); Cleveland, OH
January 15, 2022; 1:00 pm, ESPN+		at Purdue Fort Wayne	W 76–68	13–4 (7–0)	Allen County War Memorial Coliseum (1,868); Fort Wayne, IN
January 20, 2022; 8:00 pm, ESPN+		at Milwaukee	L 78–88	13–5 (7–1)	UW–Milwaukee Panther Arena (1,902); Milwaukee, WI
January 22, 2022; 1:00 pm, ESPN+		at Green Bay	W 68–61	14–5 (8–1)	Resch Center (1,327); Ashwaubenon, WI
January 24, 2022*; 7:00 pm, ESPN+		Michigan–Dearborn	W 104–61	15–5	Athletics Center O'rena (612); Rochester, MI
January 27, 2022; 7:00 pm, WMYD/ESPN+		IUPUI	Canceled due to COVID-19 issues		Athletics Center O'rena; Rochester, MI
January 29, 2022; 3:00 pm, ESPN+		UIC	W 81–74	16–5 (9–1)	Athletics Center O'rena (2,966); Rochester, MI
February 4, 2022; 7:00 pm, ESPN+		at Northern Kentucky	L 78–87 ^{OT}	16–6 (9–2)	BB&T Arena (2,073); Highland Heights, KY
February 5, 2022; 7:00 pm, ESPN+		at Wright State	L 64–75	16–7 (9–3)	Nutter Center (3,687); Dayton, OH
February 9, 2022; 7:00 pm, ESPN+		at Youngstown State	L 71–78	16–8 (9–4)	Beeghly Center (1,580); Youngstown, OH
February 11, 2022; 7:00 pm, ESPN+		at Robert Morris	W 71–68	17–8 (10–4)	UPMC Events Center (872); Moon Township, PA
February 13, 2022; 1:00 pm, WMYD/ESPN+		Detroit Mercy	W 75–69	18–8 (11–4)	Athletics Center O'rena (3,809); Rochester, MI
February 18, 2022; 9:00 pm, ESPN2		Wright State	L 74–78	18–9 (11–5)	Athletics Center O'rena (3,912); Rochester, MI
February 20, 2022; 3:00 pm, ESPN+		Northern Kentucky	L 66–71	18–10 (11–6)	Athletics Center O'rena (3,505); Rochester, MI
February 24, 2022; 7:00 pm, ESPN+		Purdue Fort Wayne	L 70–81	18–11 (11–7)	Athletics Center O'rena (3,183); Rochester, MI
February 26, 2022; 3:00 pm, WMYD/ESPN+		Cleveland State	W 65–57	19–11 (12–7)	Athletics Center O'rena (3,149); Rochester, MI
Horizon League tournament
March 1, 2022; 7:00 pm, ESPN+	(5)	(12) IUPUI; First Round	W 69–58	20–11	Athletics Center O'rena (1,728); Rochester, MI
March 3, 2022; 7:00 pm, ESPN+	(5)	at (4) Wright State; Quarterfinals	L 63–75	20–12	Nutter Center (2,873); Dayton, OH
*Non-conference game. ^{#}Rankings from AP Poll. (#) Tournament seedings in parentheses. All times are in Eastern.
