= 2021–22 Purdue Fort Wayne Mastodons men's basketball team =

American college basketball season

2021–22 Purdue Fort Wayne Mastodons men's basketball

Horizon League co-regular season champions

CBI, First Round
- Conference: Horizon League
- Record: 21–12 (15–6 Horizon)
- Head coach: Jon Coffman (8th season)
- Assistant coaches: Ryan Sims (12th season); Adam Blaylock (4th season); Mike Wolf (3rd season); Pat Lepper (1st season)
- Home arena: Hilliard Gates Sports Center

2021–22 Horizon League men's basketball standings
	Conf.				Overall
Team	W		L	PCT	W		L	PCT
Cleveland State	15	–	6	.714	20	–	11	.645
Purdue Fort Wayne	15	–	6	.714	21	–	12	.636
Northern Kentucky	14	–	6	.700	20	–	12	.625
Wright State †	15	–	7	.682	22	–	14	.611
Oakland	12	–	7	.632	20	–	12	.625
Detroit Mercy	10	–	7	.588	14	–	15	.483
Youngstown State	12	–	9	.571	19	–	15	.559
UIC	9	–	10	.474	14	–	16	.467
Milwaukee	8	–	14	.364	10	–	22	.313
Robert Morris	5	–	16	.238	8	–	23	.258
Green Bay	4	–	16	.200	5	–	25	.167
IUPUI	1	–	16	.059	3	–	26	.103
† 2022 Horizon League tournament winner

The 2021–22 Purdue Fort Wayne Mastodons men's basketball team represented Purdue University Fort Wayne in the 2021–22 NCAA Division I men's basketball season. The Mastodons, led by eighth-year head coach Jon Coffman, played their home games at the Hilliard Gates Sports Center in Fort Wayne, Indiana, as members of the Horizon League. They finished the regular season 21–11, 15–6 to earn a share of the regular season championship. As the No. 2 seed in the Horizon League tournament, they defeated UIC in the quarterfinals before losing to Northern Kentucky in the semifinals. They received a bid to the College Basketball Invitational, where they lost to top seed Drake in the first round.

== Previous season ==
In a season limited due to the ongoing COVID-19 pandemic, the Mastodons finished the 2020–21 season 8–15, 6–14 in Horizon League play to finish in 11th place. In the Horizon League tournament, they defeated Green Bay in the first round before losing to Cleveland State in the quarterfinals.

== Offseason ==
=== Departures ===
Name	Number	Pos.	Height	Weight	Year	Hometown	Reason for departure
Justice Prentice	2	G	6'1"	175	Freshman	Toronto, Ontario, Canada	Transferred to Western Texas College
Matt Havey	10	G	6'1"	185	RS Sophomore	Lansing, MI	Left team
Dylan Carl	11	F	6'11"	240	RS Senior	Alma, MI	Graduated
Bryce Waterman	22	G	6'6"	205	Sophomore	Colonie, NY	Transferred to College of Staten Island
DeMierre Black	24	G	6'0"	185	Senior	Marietta, GA	Graduated
Demetric Horton	25	G	6'5"	200	Junior	Raleigh, NC	Transferred to North Carolina A&T

=== Incoming transfers ===
Name	Number	Pos.	Height	Weight	Year	Hometown	Previous School
Damian Chong Qui	2	G	5'8"	155	Senior	Baltimore, MD	Mount St. Mary's
Quinton Morton-Robertson	11	G	5'8"	165	Junior	Radford, VA	Radford
RJ Ogom	23	F	6'6"	230	RS Freshman	Chicago, IL	College of Charleston

== Roster ==
2021–22 Purdue Fort Wayne Mastodons men's basketball team
Players
Coaches

Pos.	#	Name	Height	Weight	Year	Hometown
F	0	Bobby Planutis	6 ft 8 in (2.03 m)	200 lb (91 kg)	RS Sr	Hazleton, Pennsylvania
G	1	Jarred Godfrey	6 ft 5 in (1.96 m)	185 lb (84 kg)	Sr	Atlanta, Georgia
G	2	Damian Chong Qui	5 ft 8 in (1.73 m)	155 lb (70 kg)	Sr	Baltimore, Maryland
F	3	Ra Kpedi	6 ft 9 in (2.06 m)	225 lb (102 kg)	RS Sr	Indianapolis, Indiana
G	4	Jarvis Walker	6 ft 2 in (1.88 m)	180 lb (82 kg)	So	Muskegon, Michigan
F	5	Johnathan Dejurnett	6 ft 8 in (2.03 m)	205 lb (93 kg)	So	Memphis, Tennessee
G	10	JoJo Peterson	6 ft 5 in (1.96 m)	185 lb (84 kg)	Fr	Johns Creek, Georgia
G	11	Quinton Morton-Robertson	5 ft 8 in (1.73 m)	165 lb (75 kg)	Jr	Radford, Virginia
F	14	Redford Dunton	6 ft 7 in (2.01 m)	195 lb (88 kg)	Fr	Raleigh, North Carolina
G	15	Deonte Billups	6 ft 4 in (1.93 m)	185 lb (84 kg)	Jr	Moline, Illinois
F	23	RJ Ogom	6 ft 6 in (1.98 m)	230 lb (104 kg)	RS Fr	Chicago, Illinois
G	24	Phil Robles II	5 ft 8 in (1.73 m)	160 lb (73 kg)	Fr	South Bend, Indiana
G	25	Max Polk	6 ft 2 in (1.88 m)	175 lb (79 kg)	Fr	Omaha, Nebraska
F	34	Cameron Benford	6 ft 8 in (2.03 m)	240 lb (109 kg)	GS	Seattle, Washington
G	50	Jalon Pipkins	6 ft 4 in (1.93 m)	185 lb (84 kg)	GS	Paris, Texas

Head coach

- Jon Coffman (Washington and Lee)

Assistant coach(es)

- Ryan Sims (Indianapolis)
- Mike Wolf (William Peace)
- Adam Blaylock (Peru State)
- Pat Lepper (IPFW)

Legend

- (C) Team captain
- (S) Suspended
- (I) Ineligible
- (W) Walk-on
- Injured
- Current redshirt

Roster
Last update: November 9, 2021

== Schedule and results ==
Date time, TV	Rank^{#}	Opponent^{#}	Result	Record	High points	High rebounds	High assists	Site (attendance) city, state
Exhibition
November 4, 2021*; 7:00 p.m.		Defiance	Cancelled					Gates Sports Center; Fort Wayne, IN
Regular season
November 9, 2021*; 7:30 p.m., ESPN+		Earlham	W 103–54	1–0	19 – Pipkins	7 – Kpedi	5 – Godfrey	Memorial Coliseum (246); Fort Wayne, IN
November 16, 2021*; 7:00 p.m., ESPN+		Austin Peay	W 65–60	2–0	17 – Kpedi	7 – Pipkins	6 – Godfrey	Memorial Coliseum (1,157); Fort Wayne, IN
November 19, 2021*; 7:00 p.m., BTN+		at Minnesota	L 49–78	2–1	19 – Pipkins	9 – Kpedi	2 – Tied	Williams Arena (9,451); Minneapolis, MN
November 26, 2021*; 4:30 p.m.		vs. Southeastern Louisiana; Hilton Garden Inn FGCU Invitational	W 74–66	3–1	19 – Godfrey	9 – Kpedi	6 – Chong Qui	Alico Arena (113); Fort Myers, FL
November 27, 2021*; 4:30 p.m.		vs. Western Michigan; Hilton Garden Inn FGCU Invitational	L 85–93 ^{OT}	3–2	35 – Godfrey	6 – Godfrey	5 – Pipkins	Alico Arena (212); Fort Myers, FL
November 28, 2021*; 6:00 p.m., ESPN+		at Florida Gulf Coast; Hilton Garden Inn FGCU Invitational	L 78–85	3–3	16 – Pipkins	12 – Kpedi	7 – Godfrey	Alico Arena (1,671); Fort Myers, FL
December 2, 2021; 7:00 p.m., ESPN+		Wright State	L 73–86	3–4 (0–1)	24 – Godfrey	6 – Kpedi	7 – Godfrey	Memorial Coliseum (1,229); Fort Wayne, IN
December 4, 2021; 1:00 p.m., ESPN+		Northern Kentucky	W 71–57	4–4 (1–1)	21 – Pipkins	9 – Kpedi	5 – Godfrey	Memorial Coliseum (1,143); Fort Wayne, IN
December 8, 2021*; 8:00 p.m., ESPN+		at SIU Edwardsville	L 59–80	4–5	15 – Godfrey	6 – Kpedi	3 – Tied	First Community Arena (863); Edwardsville, IL
December 11, 2021*; 1:00 p.m., ESPN+		Southeast Missouri State	W 78–65	5–5	24 – Pipkins	5 – Kpedi	4 – Godfrey	Memorial Coliseum (1,073); Fort Wayne, IN
December 21, 2021*; 7:00 p.m., BTN		at Michigan	Canceled due to COVID-19 complications within the Purdue Fort Wayne program					Crisler Center; Ann Arbor, MI
December 30, 2021; 8:00 p.m., ESPN+		at UIC	Canceled due to COVID-19 complications within the UIC program					Credit Union 1 Arena; Chicago, IL
December 30, 2021; 7:00 p.m., ESPN+		at Cleveland State	L 81–90	5–6 (1–2)	18 – Chong Qui	5 – Godfrey	6 – Godfrey	Wolstein Center (617); Cleveland, OH
January 1, 2022; 2:00 p.m.		at IUPUI	Canceled due to COVID-19 complications within the IUPUI program					Indiana Farmers Coliseum; Indianapolis, IN
January 5, 2022; 7:00 p.m., ESPN+		at Cleveland State	L 58–65	5–7 (1–3)	18 – Godfrey	5 – Tied	5 – Chong Qui	Wolstein Center (1,642); Cleveland, OH
January 7, 2022; 7:00 p.m., ESPN+		at Youngstown State	W 71–61	6–7 (2–3)	18 – Godfrey	7 – Kpedi	3 – Tied	Beeghly Center (1,290); Youngstown, OH
January 9, 2022; 1:00 p.m., ESPN+		at Robert Morris	W 76–70	7–7 (3–3)	18 – Pipkins	6 – Tied	6 – Godfrey	UPMC Events Center (572); Moon Township, PA
January 13, 2022; 7:00 p.m., ESPN+		Detroit Mercy	W 62–60	8–7 (4–3)	10 – Chong Qui	10 – Kpedi	4 – Godfrey	Memorial Coliseum (1,113); Fort Wayne, IN
January 15, 2022; 1:00 p.m., ESPN+		Oakland	L 68–76	8–8 (4–4)	25 – Godfrey	7 – Kpedi	7 – Chong Qui	Memorial Coliseum (1,868); Fort Wayne, IN
January 17, 2022*; 7:00 p.m.		Michigan–Dearborn	W 102–59	9–8	18 – Walker	10 – Kpedi	7 – Peterson	Gates Sports Center (406); Fort Wayne, IN
January 21, 2022; 7:00 p.m., ESPN+		Robert Morris	W 86–62	10–8 (5–4)	20 – Chong Qui	4 – Tied	5 – Chong Qui	Memorial Coliseum (1,716); Fort Wayne, IN
January 23, 2022; 2:00 p.m., ESPN+		Youngstown State	W 82–71	11–8 (6–4)	19 – Pipkins	6 – Kpedi	6 – Godfrey	Memorial Coliseum (1,822); Fort Wayne, IN
January 28, 2022; 7:00 p.m., ESPN+		at Northern Kentucky	L 49–59	11–9 (6–5)	18 – Planutis	6 – Planutis	4 – Chong Qui	BB&T Arena (2,563); Highland Heights, KY
January 30, 2022; 2:00 p.m., ESPN+		at Wright State	L 63–75	11–10 (6–6)	14 – Godfrey	8 – Godfrey	3 – Tied	Nutter Center (2,877); Dayton, OH
February 4, 2022; 7:00 p.m., ESPN+		Milwaukee	W 70–60	12–10 (7–6)	15 – Pipkins	7 – Tied	4 – Tied	Memorial Coliseum (1,304); Fort Wayne, IN
February 6, 2022; 2:00 p.m., ESPN+		Green Bay	W 71–55	13–10 (8–6)	19 – Pipkins	6 – Tied	6 – Chong Qui	Memorial Coliseum (1,163); Fort Wayne, IN
February 10, 2022; 7:00 p.m., ESPN+		IUPUI	W 72–57	14–10 (9–6)	21 – Godfrey	7 – Pipkins	2 – Tied	Memorial Coliseum (1,188); Fort Wayne, IN
February 12, 2022; 7:00 p.m., ESPN+		UIC	W 73–66	15–10 (10–6)	20 – Chong Qui	6 – Godfrey	5 – Godfrey	Gates Sports Center (1,370); Fort Wayne, IN
February 14, 2022; 7:00 p.m., ESPN+		Cleveland State	W 102–98 ^{3OT}	16–10 (11–6)	27 – Pipkins	8 – Kpedi	6 – Chong Qui	Memorial Coliseum (1,165); Fort Wayne, IN
February 18, 2022; 8:00 p.m., ESPN+		at Green Bay	W 74–55	17–10 (12–6)	16 – Chong Qui	7 – Planutis	5 – Chong Qui	Kress Events Center (1,664); Green Bay, WI
February 20, 2022; 2:00 p.m., ESPN+		at Milwaukee	W 81–71	18–10 (13–6)	24 – Pipkins	7 – Tied	5 – Godfrey	UW–Milwaukee Panther Arena (2,144); Milwaukee, WI
February 24, 2022; 7:00 p.m., ESPN+		at Oakland	W 81–70	19–10 (14–6)	18 – Tied	10 – Godfrey	8 – Godfrey	Athletics Center O'rena (3,183); Auburn Hills, MI
February 26, 2022; 1:00 p.m., ESPN+		at Detroit Mercy	W 81–78	20–10 (15–6)	18 – Billups	6 – Tied	5 – Godfrey	Calihan Hall (2,524); Detroit, MI
Horizon League tournament
March 3, 2022; 7:00 pm, ESPN+	(2)	(8) UIC; Quarterfinals	W 78–72	21–10	21 – Godfrey	8 – Kpedi	3 – Chong Qui	Memorial Coliseum (2,135); Fort Wayne, IN
March 7, 2022; 9:30 pm, ESPN2	(2)	vs. (3) Northern Kentucky; Semifinals	L 43–57	21–11	11 – Godfrey	7 – Kpedi	4 – Godfrey	Indiana Farmers Coliseum; Indianapolis, IN
CBI
March 19, 2022; 12:00 pm, FloHoops	(16)	vs. (1) Drake; First Round	L 65–87	21–12	16 – Godfrey	9 – Kpedi	3 – Tied	Ocean Center (367); Daytona Beach, FL
*Non-conference game. ^{#}Rankings from AP Poll. (#) Tournament seedings in parentheses. All times are in Eastern.
