= Jersey Mike's Classic =

College basketball tournament

- Sport: College basketball
- Founded: 2021
- Founder: Van Wagner / Superior Sports
- First season: 2021–22
- Folded: 2021
- No. of teams: 6
- Country: United States
- Venues: McArthur Center, St. Petersburg, Florida
- Broadcasters: CBSSN, Pluto TV
- Sponsor: Jersey Mike's Subs
- Website: Jersey Mike’s Classic

The Jersey Mike’s Classic was a three-day round-robin men's college basketball tournament held the weekend prior to Thanksgiving at the McArthur Center on the campus of Eckerd College in St. Petersburg, Florida. The tournament focused strictly on mid-major National Collegiate Athletic Association (NCAA) basketball programs, giving them an opportunity for good-quality non-conference match-ups on a neutral floor in a prime location.

It was created to temporarily replace the Jamaica Classic tournament that had been cancelled due to the COVID-19 pandemic, with the competition planned for the 2021 Jamaica Classic shifted to the Jersey Mike's Classic.

== Participants and bracket ==
- Ball State
- FIU
- Green Bay
- UMass
- UNC Greensboro
- Weber State

November 18
Green Bay	58
UNC Greensboro	60

November 18
UMass	73
Weber State	88

November 18
Ball State	60
FIU	73

November 19
UNC Greensboro	90
UMass	93*

November 19
Weber State	85
Ball State	74

November 19
FIU	63
Green Bay	60

November 21
Green Bay	58
Weber State	68

November 21
Ball State	89
UMass	86

November 21
UNC Greensboro	71
FIU	74*

* – Denotes overtime period
