= 2024–25 Horizon League men's basketball season =

- League: NCAA Division I
- Sport: Men's basketball
- Teams: 11
- TV partner(s): ESPN+ ESPN2; ESPNU; ESPN

Regular season
- Season champions: Robert Morris
- Season MVP: Alvaro Folgueiras, Robert Morris

Tournament
- Champions: Robert Morris
- Runners-up: Youngstown State
- Finals MVP: Kam Woods, Robert Morris

Basketball seasons
- ← 2023–24 2025–26 →

2024–25 Horizon League men's basketball standings
	Conf.				Overall
Team	W		L	PCT	W		L	PCT
Robert Morris †	15	–	5	.750	26	–	9	.743
Cleveland State	14	–	6	.700	23	–	13	.639
Milwaukee	14	–	6	.700	21	–	11	.656
Youngstown State	13	–	7	.650	21	–	13	.618
Purdue Fort Wayne	12	–	8	.600	19	–	13	.594
Oakland	11	–	9	.550	16	–	18	.471
Northern Kentucky	11	–	9	.550	17	–	16	.515
Wright State	8	–	12	.400	15	–	18	.455
IU Indy	6	–	14	.300	10	–	22	.313
Detroit Mercy	4	–	16	.200	8	–	24	.250
Green Bay	2	–	18	.100	4	–	28	.125
† 2025 Horizon League tournament winner

The 2024–25 Horizon League men's basketball season began with practices in September 2024 and ended with the 2025 Horizon League men's basketball tournament in March 2025. This was the 45th season for Horizon League men's basketball.

== Head coaches ==
=== Coaching changes ===
- On March 6, 2024, IUPUI (now IU Indy) fired head coach Matt Crenshaw after three seasons. On March 25, the school hired Division II Indianapolis head coach Paul Corsaro to replace Crenshaw.
- On March 7, 2024, Detroit Mercy fired head coach Mike Davis following a 1–31 season, ending his six-year tenure with the team. On April 3, Michigan State assistant coach Mark Montgomery was named the team's new coach.
- On March 28, 2024, Wright State head coach Scott Nagy was hired as the head coach at Southern Illinois. That same day, Wright State promoted assistant Clint Sargent to head coach.
- On March 30, 2024, Youngstown State head coach Jerrod Calhoun was hired as the head coach at Utah State. On April 1, Youngstown State promoted assistant Ethan Faulkner to head coach.
- On May 12, 2024, Green Bay head coach Sundance Wicks was hired as the head coach at Wyoming after one season with the Phoenix. Two days later, Green Bay named talk radio host and Oklahoma State all-time assists leader Doug Gottlieb as head coach.

=== Coaches ===
Team	Head coach	Previous job	Season	Overall record	Horizon record	NCAA Tournaments
Cleveland State	Daniyal Robinson	Iowa State (asst.)	3rd	42–29 (.592)	25–15 (.625)	0
Detroit Mercy	Mark Montgomery	Michigan State (asst.)	1st	0–0 (–)	0–0 (–)	0
Green Bay	Doug Gottlieb	none	1st	0–0 (–)	0–0 (–)	0
IU Indy	Paul Corsaro	Indianapolis	1st	0–0 (–)	0–0 (–)	0
Milwaukee	Bart Lundy	Queens	3rd	42–27 (.609)	26–14 (.650)	0
Northern Kentucky	Darrin Horn	Texas (asst.)	6th	97–60 (.618)	64–32 (.667)	2
Oakland	Greg Kampe	Toledo (asst.)	41st	694–526 (.569)	117–72 (.619)	1
Purdue Fort Wayne	Jon Coffman	IPFW (asst.)	11th	178–141 (.558)	92–84 (.523)	0
Robert Morris	Andrew Toole	Robert Morris (asst.)	15th	226–232 (.493)	139–115 (.547)	2
Wright State	Clint Sargent	Wright State (asst.)	1st	0–0 (–)	0–0 (–)	0
Youngstown State	Ethan Faulkner	Youngstown State (asst.)	1st	0–0 (–)	0–0 (–)	0

Notes:

- Season number includes 2024–25 season.
- Records are prior to 2024–25 season.

== Preseason ==
=== Preseason coaches poll ===
2024–25 Horizon League Preseason Coaches Poll
Rank	Team (First Place Votes)	Points
1.	Milwaukee (15)	421
1.	Purdue Fort Wayne (14)	421
3.	Northern Kentucky (4)	389
4.	Oakland (5)	345
5.	Wright State (4)	315
6.	Youngstown State (1)	272
7.	Cleveland State	252
8.	Green Bay	171
9.	Robert Morris	148
10.	IU Indy (1)	91
11.	Detroit Mercy	79

=== Preseason All-Horizon League ===
First team	Second team
Trey Robinson, Northern Kentucky	AJ McKee, Milwaukee
Sam Vinson, Northern Kentucky	Erik Pratt, Milwaukee
Rasheed Bello, Purdue Fort Wayne	DQ Cole, Oakland
Jalen Jackson, Purdue Fort Wayne	Quinton Morton-Robertson, Purdue Fort Wayne
Brandon Noel, Wright State	Alex Huibregtse, Wright State
Preseason Player of the Year: Brandon Noel, Wright State

== Regular season ==
=== Player of the Week awards ===
Week	Player of the Week	School	Freshman of the Week	School
1	Alex Huibregtse	Wright State	Nate Johnson	Detroit Mercy
2	Rasheed Bello	Purdue Fort Wayne	Keenan Garner	IU Indy
3	Themus Fulks	Milwaukee	Antallah Sandlin-El	Robert Morris
4	DQ Cole	Oakland	DeSean Goode	IU Indy
5	EJ Farmer	Youngstown State	Je'Shawn Stevenson	Cleveland State
6	Jamichael Stillwell	Milwaukee	Je'Shawn Stevenson (2)	Cleveland State
7	Tevin Smith	Cleveland State	Je'Shawn Stevenson (3)	Cleveland State
8	Alvaro Folgueiras	Robert Morris	Je'Shawn Stevenson (4)	Cleveland State
9	Trey Robinson	Northern Kentucky	Andrea Holden	Wright State
10	Rasheed Bello (2)	Purdue Fort Wayne	DeSean Goode (2)	IU Indy
11	Jalen Jackson	Purdue Fort Wayne	Ryan Kalambay	Detroit Mercy
12	Jalen Jackson (2)	Purdue Fort Wayne	Reece Robinson	Cleveland State
13	Chase Robinson	Cleveland State	DeSean Goode (3)	IU Indy
14	Alvaro Folgueiras (2)	Robert Morris	Je'Shawn Stevenson (5)	Cleveland State
15	Alvaro Folgueiras (3)	Robert Morris	Nassim Mashhour	Oakland
15	Nico Galette	Youngstown State	Nassim Mashhour	Oakland
16	Kam Woods	Robert Morris	Nate Johnson (2)	Detroit Mercy

School	POTW	FOTW
Cleveland State	2	6
Detroit Mercy	0	3
Green Bay	0	0
IU Indy	0	4
Milwaukee	2	0
Northern Kentucky	1	0
Oakland	1	1
Purdue Fort Wayne	4	0
Robert Morris	4	1
Wright State	1	1
Youngstown State	2	0

=== Early season tournaments ===
The following table summarizes the multiple-team events (MTE) or early-season tournaments in which teams from the Horizon League will participate.

Team	Tournament	Location	Dates	Finish
Cleveland State	Viking Invitational	Cleveland, OH	November 26–29	–
Detroit Mercy	Jacksonville Classic	Jacksonville, FL	November 26–27	N/A
Green Bay	Ohio State MTE	Evansville, IN; Columbus, OH	November 22–30	–
IU Indy	Bulldog Bash	Huntsville, AL	November 22–25	–
Milwaukee	Cream City Classic	Milwaukee, WI	November 22–24	–
Northern Kentucky	Twyman-Stokes NKU Classic	Highland Heights, KY	November 14–19	–
Oakland	Diamond Head Classic	Honolulu, HI	November 22–23	4th
Purdue Fort Wayne	Sunshine Slam	Daytona Beach, FL	November 20–26	–
Robert Morris	Urban-Bennett Invitational	Moon Township, PA	November 14–17	–
Wright State	Myrtle Beach Invitational	Conway, SC	November 21–24	4th
Youngstown State	Axe 'Em Classic	Nacogdoches, TX	November 21–23	–

== Postseason ==
=== Horizon League tournament ===
The conference tournament was played from March 4 to March 11, 2025. The first round and quarterfinals were hosted at campus sites, while the semifinals and finals were held at Corteva Coliseum in Indianapolis, Indiana. Teams were seeded by conference record, with ties broken by record between the tied teams followed by record against the regular-season champion, if necessary. The top five teams received a bye to the quarterfinals and the bracket is re-seeded after every round.

First round Tuesday, March 4
8	Wright State	98
9	IU Indy	85
7	Northern Kentucky	99
10	Detroit Mercy	75
6	Oakland	96
11	Green Bay	72

Quarterfinals; Thursday, March 6
1	Robert Morris	83
8	Wright State	62
4	Youngstown State	72
5	Purdue Fort Wayne	67
2	Cleveland State	68
7	Northern Kentucky	63
3	Milwaukee	64
6	Oakland	72

Semifinals; Monday, March 10
1	Robert Morris	79^{OT}
6	Oakland	76
2	Cleveland State	54
4	Youngstown State	56

Championship; Tuesday, March 11
1	Robert Morris	89
4	Youngstown State	78

=== NCAA Tournament ===
As the conference champion, Robert Morris received an automatic bid to the 2025 NCAA Division I men's basketball tournament.

Seed	Region	School	First Four	First round	Second round	Sweet Sixteen	Elite Eight	Final Four	Championship
15	East	Robert Morris	―	lost to (2) Alabama 90–81	―	―	―	―	―

=== College Basketball Invitational ===
Cleveland State accepted a bid to the 2025 College Basketball Invitational after finishing as semifinalists in the conference tournament.

School	First round	Quarterfinals	Semifinals	Finals
Cleveland State	−	defeated Queens (NC) 88–73	defeated Florida Gulf Coast 72–65	lost to Florida Gulf Coast 79–68

== National awards ==
=== Preseason watchlists ===
Horizon League players were selected to the following preseason award watchlists:

	Henson
Rasheed Bello, Purdue Fort Wayne	✓
AJ McKee, Milwaukee	✓
Brandon Noel, Wright State	✓

== Conference awards ==
**2025 Horizon League individual awards**
Award	Recipient(s)
Player of the Year	Alvaro Folgueiras, Robert Morris
Coach of the Year	Andy Toole, Robert Morris
Defensive Player of the Year	Amarion Dickerson, Robert Morris
Sixth Man of the Year	Chase Robinson, Cleveland State
Freshman of the Year	Je'Shawn Stevenson, Cleveland State
Newcomer of the Year	Jamichael Stillwell, Milwaukee
Sportsmanship Award	Jalen Jackson, Purdue Fort Wayne

**2025 Horizon League all-conference teams**
First Team	Second Team	Third Team	Defensive Team	Freshman Team
Tevin Smith, CSU; Jamichael Stillwell, MKE; Rasheed Bello, PFW; Jalen Jackson, PFW; Alvaro Folgueiras, RMU	Themus Fulks, MKE; Allen Mukeba, OAK; Amarion Dickerson, RMU; Kam Woods, RMU; Brandon Noel, WSU	Dylan Arnett, CSU; Tahj Staveskie, CSU; Trey Robinson, NKU; EJ Farmer, YSU; Nico Galette, YSU	Reece Robinson, CSU; Je'Shawn Stevenson, CSU; Nate Johnson, DMU; DeSean Goode, IUI; Solomon Callaghan, WSU	Dylan Arnett, CSU; Tevin Smith, CSU; Rasheed Bello, PFW; Amarion Dickerson, RMU; Gabe Dynes, YSU

**2025 Horizon League**
**All-Tournament Team**
**Kam Woods, RMU**
Josh Omojafo, RMU
DJ Smith, RMU
Nico Galette, YSU
Allen Mukeba, OAK
**Bold** denotes MVP

== Attendance ==
=== Average home attendances ===
Note: Figures include conference tournament

#	Team	GP	Cumulative	High	Low	Avg.
1	Wright State	15	62,220	9,672	2,488	4,188
2	Northern Kentucky	18	50,787	7,485	1,721	2,822
3	Milwaukee	16	34,347	3,507	1,335	2,147
4	Youngstown State	16	30,639	2,843	1,303	1,915
5	Green Bay	14	29,820	5,207	1,501	2,130
6	Oakland	13	28,068	3,029	1,306	2,159
7	Cleveland State	18	25,698	2,269	403	1,428
8	Robert Morris	18	22,221	4,068	646	1,235
9	Purdue Fort Wayne	14	21,854	2,603	770	1,561
10	Detroit Mercy	13	14,727	2,047	807	1,133
11	IU Indy	17	14,353	3,716	536	1,025
Total		169	334,734	9,672	403	1,981
