= 2025 Horizon League men's basketball tournament =

American college basketball postseason tournament

- Classification: Division I
- Season: 2024–25
- Teams: 11
- Site: Campus sites (First Round and Quarterfinals); Corteva Coliseum; Indianapolis, Indiana (Semifinals and Finals)
- Champions: Robert Morris (1st title)
- Winning coach: Andrew Toole (3rd title, 1st Horizon League title)
- MVP: Kam Woods (Robert Morris)
- Attendance: 2,273 (championship)
- Top scorer: Kam Woods (Robert Morris) (59 points)
- Television: ESPN+, ESPNU, ESPN2, ESPN

2024–25 Horizon League men's basketball standings
	Conf.				Overall
Team	W		L	PCT	W		L	PCT
Robert Morris †	15	–	5	.750	26	–	9	.743
Cleveland State	14	–	6	.700	23	–	13	.639
Milwaukee	14	–	6	.700	21	–	11	.656
Youngstown State	13	–	7	.650	21	–	13	.618
Purdue Fort Wayne	12	–	8	.600	19	–	13	.594
Oakland	11	–	9	.550	16	–	18	.471
Northern Kentucky	11	–	9	.550	17	–	16	.515
Wright State	8	–	12	.400	15	–	18	.455
IU Indy	6	–	14	.300	10	–	22	.313
Detroit Mercy	4	–	16	.200	8	–	24	.250
Green Bay	2	–	18	.100	4	–	28	.125
† 2025 Horizon League tournament winner

The 2025 Horizon League Men's Basketball Tournament was the final event of the 2024–25 men's basketball season for the Horizon League. It was held from March 4–11, 2025; first-round and quarterfinal games were played at the home courts of the higher seeds, with all remaining games at Corteva Coliseum in Indianapolis. The winner, Robert Morris, received the conference's automatic berth into the NCAA Tournament. The tournament was sponsored by Barbasol for the third consecutive year.

== Seeds ==
All teams in the conference participated in the tournament, with the top five teams receiving byes to the quarterfinals. The bracket is reset after each round so that the lowest remaining seed always plays the highest.

Seed	School	Conf	Tiebreaker
1	Robert Morris	15−5	
2	Cleveland State	14−6	1−1 vs Robert Morris
3	Milwaukee	14−6	0−2 vs Robert Morris
4	Youngstown State	13−7	
5	Purdue Fort Wayne	12−8	
6	Oakland	11−9	1–1 vs. Milwaukee
7	Northern Kentucky	11−9	0–2 vs. Milwaukee
8	Wright State	8−12	
9	IU Indy	6−14	
10	Detroit Mercy	4−16	
11	Green Bay	2−18	

== Schedule ==
Game	Time	Matchup	Score	Television
First Round – Tuesday, March 4
1	7:00 pm	No. 11 Green Bay at No. 6 Oakland	72–96	ESPN+
2	7:00 pm	No. 10 Detroit Mercy at No. 7 Northern Kentucky	75–99	ESPN+
3	7:00 pm	No. 9 IU Indy at No. 8 Wright State	85–98	ESPN+
Quarterfinals – Thursday, March 6
4	7:00 pm	No. 8 Wright State at No. 1 Robert Morris	62–83	ESPN+
5	7:00 pm	No. 7 Northern Kentucky at No. 2 Cleveland State	63–68	ESPN+
6	7:00 pm	No. 6 Oakland at No. 3 Milwaukee	72–64	ESPN+
7	7:00 pm	No. 5 Purdue Fort Wayne at No. 4 Youngstown State	67–72	ESPN+
Semifinals – Monday, March 10 at Corteva Coliseum, Indianapolis, IN
8	7:00 pm	No. 1 Robert Morris vs. No. 6 Oakland	79–76^{OT}	ESPNU
9	9:30 pm	No. 2 Cleveland State vs. No. 4 Youngstown State	54–56	ESPN2
Championship – Tuesday, March 11 at Corteva Coliseum, Indianapolis, IN
10	7:00 pm	No. 1 Robert Morris vs. No. 4 Youngstown State	89–78	ESPN/ESPN2
First round and quarterfinals game times are local. Semifinals and championship game times are in EDT. Rankings denote tournament seed.

== Bracket ==
First round Tuesday, March 4
8	Wright State	98
9	IU Indy	85
7	Northern Kentucky	99
10	Detroit Mercy	75
6	Oakland	96
11	Green Bay	72

Quarterfinals; Thursday, March 6
1	Robert Morris	83
8	Wright State	62
4	Youngstown State	72
5	Purdue Fort Wayne	67
2	Cleveland State	68
7	Northern Kentucky	63
3	Milwaukee	64
6	Oakland	72

Semifinals; Monday, March 10
1	Robert Morris	79^{OT}
6	Oakland	76
2	Cleveland State	54
4	Youngstown State	56

Championship; Tuesday, March 11
1	Robert Morris	89
4	Youngstown State	78

== Game summaries ==
All times are in Eastern Time (UTC−5 on March 4 and 6 and UTC−4 on March 10 and 11)

=== First Round ===
ESPN+

March 4
7:00 p.m.

Box

No. 11 Green Bay 67, No. 6 Oakland 92
Scoring by half: 34–47, 38–49
Pts: Johnson 21; Rebs: Levy 11; Asts: Tweedy, Levy 6	Pts: Mukeba, I. Jones 15; Rebs: Mukeba 11; Asts: J. Jones 8
Oakland advances to the Horizon League Quarterfinals

Athletics Center O'Rena
Rochester, MI
Attendance: 2,003
Referees: Alfred Smith, Jim Bruno, Earl Walton

ESPN+

March 4
7:00 p.m.

Box

No. 10 Detroit Mercy 75, No.7 Northern Kentucky 75
Scoring by half: 34–47, 38–49
Pts: Lovejoy 21; Rebs: Kalambay 6 Asts: Lovejoy 4	Pts: Gherezgher 19; Rebs: Wells 9 Asts: Vinson 6
Northern Kentucky advances to the Horizon League Quarterfinals

Truist Area
Highland Heights, KY
Attendance: 1,879
Referees: Chris Beaver, Bryan Anslinger, Tim Comer

ESPN+

March 4
8:00 p.m.

Box

No. 9 IU Indianapolis 85, No. 8 Wright State 98
Scoring by half: 42–43, 43–55
Pts: Walker 20; Rebs: Craig 7 Asts: Craig 5	Pts: Doumbia 23; Rebs: Doumbia 12; Asts: Doumbia 7
Wright State advances to the Horizon League Quarterfinals

Ervin J. Nutter Center
Fairborn, OH
Attendance: 2,488
Referees: Jermaine Rogers, Sutton Simon, Brian McNutt

=== Quarterfinals ===
ESPN+

March 6
8:00 p.m.

Box

No. 8 Wright State 62, No. 1 Robert Morris 83
Scoring by half: 31–41, 31–42
Pts: Noel, Imariagbe 15; Rebs: Norris 7 Asts: Noel, Norris 3	Pts: Gherezgher 19; Rebs: Wells 9 Asts: Vinson 6
Robert Morris advances to the Horizon League Semifinals

UMPC Events Center
Carnot-Moon, PA
Attendance: 4,068
Referees: Tariq Lucas, Andy O'Brien, John Floyd

ESPN+

March 6
8:00 p.m.

Box

No. 7 Northern Kentucky 63, No. 2 Cleveland State 68
Scoring by half: 27-33, 36-35
Pts: Gherezgher 18; Rebs: Wells 10; Asts: Vinson 6	Pts: Arnnet, Smith 16; Rebs: Arnett 10; Asts: Arnett, Dibba 4
Cleveland State advances to the Horizon League Semifinals

Henry J. Goodman Arena
Cleveland, OH
Attendance: 1,465
Referees: Steve McJunkins, Amy Bonner, Jim Bruno

ESPN+

March 6
8:00 p.m.

Box

No. 6 Oakland 72, No. 3 Milwaukee 64
Scoring by half: 39–31, 33–33
Pts: Mukeba 21; Rebs: Mukeba 7 Asts: Jones 5	Pts: Fulks 20; Rebs: Stillwell 8 Asts: Stillwell, Fulks 6
Oakland advances to the Horizon League Semifinals

UWM Panther Arena
Milwaukee, WI
Attendance: 2,151
Referees: Nate Harris, Tim Comer, Randy Richardson

ESPN+

March 6
7:00 p.m.

Box

No. 5 Purdue Fort-Wayne 67, No. 4 Youngstown State 72
Scoring by half: 26-26, 41-46
Pts: Morton-Robertson 21; Rebs: Jackson 11; Asts: Bello 6	Pts: Galette 22; Rebs: Carroll 12; Asts: Nelson 3
Youngstown State advances to the Horizon League Semifinals

Beeghly Center
Youngstown, OH
Attendance: 2,605
Referees: Chad Barlow, King Whetstone, Bill Ek

=== Semifinals ===
ESPN2ESPN+

March 10
7:00 p.m.

Box

No. 6 Oakland 76, No. 1 Robert Morris 79 (OT)
Scoring by half: 38–34, 36–40 Overtime: 2-5
Pts: Mukeba 18; Rebs: I. Jones 7 Asts: J. Jones 4	Pts: Woods 23; Rebs: Omojafo, Plet 5 Asts: Woods 7
Robert Morris advances to the Horizon League Finals

Corteva Coliseum
Indianapolis, IN
Attendance: 1,775
Referees: Edwin Young, Amy Bonner, Larry Scirotto

ESPNUESPN+

March 10
9:30 p.m.

Box

No. 4 Youngstown State 54, No. 2 Cleveland State 52
Scoring by half: 22-21, 34-33
Pts: Uijtendaal 13; Rebs: Galette 12; Asts: Galette 4	Pts: Smith 14; Rebs: Abidde 7 Asts: Dibba 4
Youngstown State advances to the Horizon League Finals

Corteva Coliseum
Indianapolis, IN
Attendance: 1,775
Referees: Andy O'Brien, Jim Bruno, John Floyd

=== Finals ===
ESPNESPN+

March 11
7:00 p.m.

Box

No. 4 Youngstown State 78, No. 1 Robert Morris 89
Scoring by half: 29–34, 49–55
Pts: Maxey 23; Rebs: Dynes 10; Asts: Maxey, Uijtendaal 4	Pts: Omojafo 24; Rebs: Omojafo 13; Asts: Folgueiras 7
Robert Morris wins Horizon League Finals

Corteva Coliseum
Indianapolis, IN
Attendance: 2273
Referees: Tim Comer, Randy Richardson, Earl Walton

== Awards and honors ==
2025 Horizon League Men's Basketball All-Tournament Team
- Kam Woods, Robert Morris (MVP)
- Josh Omojafo, Robert Morris
- DJ Smith, Robert Morris
- Nico Galette, Youngstown State
- Allen Mukeba, Oakland
