= 2024–25 IU Indy Jaguars men's basketball team =

American college basketball season

2024–2025 IU Indy Jaguars men's basketball
- Conference: Horizon League
- Record: 10–22 (6–14 Horizon)
- Head coach: Paul Corsaro (1st season)
- Assistant coaches: Mike Burris (1st season); Tony Wills (1st season); Scott Gauthier (1st season)
- Home arena: Corteva Coliseum; The Jungle

2024–25 Horizon League men's basketball standings
	Conf.				Overall
Team	W		L	PCT	W		L	PCT
Robert Morris †	15	–	5	.750	26	–	9	.743
Cleveland State	14	–	6	.700	23	–	13	.639
Milwaukee	14	–	6	.700	21	–	11	.656
Youngstown State	13	–	7	.650	21	–	13	.618
Purdue Fort Wayne	12	–	8	.600	19	–	13	.594
Oakland	11	–	9	.550	16	–	18	.471
Northern Kentucky	11	–	9	.550	17	–	16	.515
Wright State	8	–	12	.400	15	–	18	.455
IU Indy	6	–	14	.300	10	–	22	.313
Detroit Mercy	4	–	16	.200	8	–	24	.250
Green Bay	2	–	18	.100	4	–	28	.125
† 2025 Horizon League tournament winner

The 2024–25 IU Indy Jaguars men's basketball team represented Indiana University Indianapolis in the 2024–25 NCAA Division I men's basketball season. This was the first ever season for the institution following the dissolution of Indiana University–Purdue University Indianapolis. The athletic program transferred to the new IU Indianapolis, with an athletic branding of IU Indy. The Jaguars were led by first-year head coach Paul Corsaro and played their home games at Corteva Coliseum and The Jungle in Indianapolis, Indiana as members of the Horizon League.

== Previous season ==
The Jaguars finished the 2023–24 season 6–25, 2–18 in Horizon League play to finish in tenth place. As the No. 10 seed in the Horizon League tournament, they lost Cleveland State in the first round.

== Offseason ==
=== Incoming transfers ===
Transfers
Name	Pos.	Height	Weight	Year	Hometown	Previous school
Timaris Brown	F	6'5	215	Junior	Chicago, IL	Rockhurst University
Sean Craig	G	6'3	220	Junior	Sylvania, OH	Indianapolis
Nathan Dudukovich	G	6'3	190	Sophomore	West Chester, OH	Thomas More
Caleb Hannah	G	6'7	205	Sophomore	Chicago, IL	Miami Dade College
Ajay Holubar	G	6'3	185	Junior	Bargersville, IN	Indianapolis
Briggs McClain	F	6'7	185	Graduate Student	Martinsburg, WV	Manhattan
Alec Millender	G	6'1	185	Senior	Chicago, IL	Wayne State
Ebenezer Ogoh	C	6'10	240	Sophomore	Calgary, Alberta	Harcum College
Julian Steinfeld	C	7'0	255	Graduate Student	Frankfurt, Germany	Indianapolis
Jarvis Walker	G	6'3	205	Graduate Student	Muskegon, MI	Indianapolis
Paul Zilinskas	G	6'6	205	Graduate Student	Kaunas, Lithuania	Indianapolis

== Roster ==
2024–25 IU Indy Jaguars men's basketball team
Players
Coaches

Pos.	#	Name	Height	Weight	Year	Hometown
G	0	Paul Zilinskas	6 ft 5 in (1.96 m)	205 lb (93 kg)	GS	Kaunas, Lithuania
G	1	Alec Millender	6 ft 1 in (1.85 m)	185 lb (84 kg)	Sr	Chicago, Illinois
F	2	DeSean Goode	6 ft 8 in (2.03 m)	230 lb (104 kg)	Fr	Fairmont, West Virginia
G	4	Jarvis Walker	6 ft 3 in (1.91 m)	205 lb (93 kg)	Fr	Muskegon, Michigan
G	5	Ron Rutland III	6 ft 2 in (1.88 m)	180 lb (82 kg)	Fr	Indianapolis, Indiana
G	6	Briggs McClain	6 ft 3 in (1.91 m)	185 lb (84 kg)	GS	Martinsburg, West Virginia
G	7	Sean Craig	6 ft 7 in (2.01 m)	220 lb (100 kg)	Jr	Sylvania, Ohio
G	10	Drew Kegerreis (W)	6 ft 3 in (1.91 m)	180 lb (82 kg)	Fr	Indianapolis, Indiana
G	11	Caleb Hannah	6 ft 7 in (2.01 m)	205 lb (93 kg)	So	Chicago, Illinois
G	12	Nathan Dudukovich	6 ft 3 in (1.91 m)	190 lb (86 kg)	So	West Chester, Ohio
F	13	Keenan Garner	6 ft 6 in (1.98 m)	220 lb (100 kg)	Fr	Fishers, Indiana
G	22	Ajay Holubar	6 ft 3 in (1.91 m)	185 lb (84 kg)	Jr	Bargersville, Indiana
C	23	Ebenezer Ogoh	6 ft 10 in (2.08 m)	240 lb (109 kg)	So	Calgary, Alberta
C	24	Julian Steinfeld	7 ft 0 in (2.13 m)	255 lb (116 kg)	GS	Frankfurt, Germany
F	30	Timaris Brown	6 ft 5 in (1.96 m)	215 lb (98 kg)	Jr	Chicago, Illinois
F	31	Luke Peters (W)	6 ft 7 in (2.01 m)	195 lb (88 kg)	Fr	Fishers, Indiana

Head coach

- Paul Corsaro (Indianapolis)

Assistant coach(es)

- Mike Burris (Cal Poly)
- Tony Wills (Illinois State)
- Scott Gauthier (Missouri)

Legend

- (C) Team captain
- (S) Suspended
- (I) Ineligible
- (W) Walk-on
- Injured
- Current redshirt

Roster

== Schedule and results ==
Date time, TV	Rank^{#}	Opponent^{#}	Result	Record	High points	High rebounds	High assists	Site (attendance) city, state
Regular season
November 4, 2024*; 11:00 am, ESPN+		IU Columbus	W 100–44	1–0	16 – Craig	13 – Garner	3 – Tied	Corteva Coliseum (3,716); Indianapolis, IN
November 8, 2024*; 6:00 pm, FS1		at Xavier	L 80–94	1–1	20 – Walker	10 – Craig	6 – Millender	Cintas Center (10,224); Cincinnati, OH
November 12, 2024*; 6:30 pm, ESPN+		Goshen College	W 97–55	2–1	27 – Zilinskas	14 – Craig	5 – Millender	The Jungle (765); Indianapolis, IN
November 14, 2024*; 6:30 pm, ESPN+		Eastern Michigan	L 71–74	2–2	25 – Zilinskas	10 – Craig	3 – Dudukovich	The Jungle (752); Indianapolis, IN
November 18, 2024*; 8:00 pm, ESPN+		at No. 5 Iowa State	L 52–87	2–3	16 – Zilinskas	6 – Craig	3 – Millender	Hilton Coliseum (13,615); Ames, IA
November 22, 2024*; 5:00 pm, ESPN+		vs. Coastal Carolina; Alabama A&M Tournament	L 57–71	2–4	21 – Zilinskas	6 – Walker	2 – Tied	Alabama A&M Events Center (297); Huntsville, AL
November 23, 2024*; 2:00 pm, ESPN+		vs. South Carolina State; Alabama A&M Tournament	L 62–72	2–5	21 – Walker	7 – Goode	4 – Walker	Alabama A&M Events Center (169); Huntsville, AL
November 25, 2024*; 3:00 pm, ESPN+		at Alabama A&M; Alabama A&M Tournament	W 88–83	3–5	32 – Zilinskas	8 – Brown	3 – Walker	Alabama A&M Events Center (320); Huntsville, AL
November 30, 2024*; 2:00 pm, ESPN+		Trinity Christian College	W 106–49	4–5	20 – Walker	10 – Garner	7 – Millender	The Jungle (676); Indianapolis, IN
December 4, 2024; 6:30 pm, ESPN+		Green Bay	W 84–75	5–5 (1–0)	25 – Walker	12 – Craig	5 – Millender	The Jungle (615); Indianapolis, IN
December 7, 2024; 2:00 pm, ESPN+		Northern Kentucky	L 64–66	5–6 (1–1)	24 – Zilinskas	13 – Craig	3 – Craig	The Jungle (536); Indianapolis, IN
December 11, 2024; 7:00 pm, ESPN+		Purdue Fort Wayne	L 76–78	5–7 (1–2)	25 – Craig	11 – Craig	7 – Millender	Hilliard Gates Sports Center (1,407); Fort Wayne, IN
December 14, 2024*; 4:30 pm, ESPN+		at Lindenwood	L 63–81	5–8	18 – Zilinskas	8 – Steinfeld	5 – Millender	Robert F. Hyland Performance Arena (610); St. Charles, MO
December 21, 2024*; 6:00 pm, ESPN+		at FIU	L 69–75	5–9	24 – Walker	12 – Craig	6 – Walker	Ocean Bank Convocation Center (595); Miami, FL
December 29, 2024; 2:00 pm, ESPN+		at Milwaukee	L 81–88	5–10 (1–3)	22 – Craig	8 – Craig	5 – Millender	UW–Milwaukee Panther Arena (1,335); Milwaukee, WI
January 1, 2025; 12:00 pm, ESPN+		Youngstown State	L 61–77	5–11 (1–4)	19 – Zilinskas	7 – Garner	4 – Millender	Corteva Coliseum (562); Indianapolis, IN
January 4, 2025; 3:00 pm, ESPN+		at Cleveland State	L 61–67	5–12 (1–5)	19 – Brown	9 – Goode	3 – Tied	Wolstein Center (1,126); Cleveland, OH
January 9, 2025; 6:30 pm, ESPN+		Detroit Mercy	W 95–61	6–12 (2–5)	20 – Walker	13 – Goode	7 – Craig	The Jungle (667); Indianapolis, IN
January 15, 2025; 7:00 pm, ESPN+		at Oakland	L 59–72	6–13 (2–6)	16 – Walker	8 – Craig	4 – Walker	OU Credit Union O'rena (2,037); Auburn Hills, MI
January 19, 2025; 2:00 pm, ESPN+		Cleveland State	L 62–73	6–14 (2–7)	13 – Zilinskas	5 – Tied	4 – Millender	The Jungle (868); Indianapolis, IN
January 22, 2025; 7:00 pm, ESPN+		at Green Bay	W 86–77	7–14 (3–7)	24 – Craig	9 – Tied	8 – Walker	Resch Center (1,958); Ashwaubenon, WI
January 25, 2024; 2:00 pm, ESPN+		Purdue Fort Wayne	L 80–91	7–15 (3–8)	23 – Zilinskas	10 – Goode	3 – Tied	The Jungle (1,102); Indianapolis, IN
January 30, 2024; 7:00 pm, ESPN+		at Robert Morris	L 53–106	7–16 (3–9)	18 – Goode	10 – Craig	2 – Zilinskas	UPMC Events Center (1,078); Moon, PA
February 1, 2025; 2:00 pm, ESPN+		at Youngstown State	W 84–79	8–16 (4–9)	23 – Goode	8 – Goode	5 – Walker	Beeghly Center (2,843); Youngstown, OH
February 5, 2025; 6:30 pm, ESPN+		Milwaukee	L 80–84 ^{OT}	8–17 (4–10)	25 – Zilinskas	12 – Goode	6 – Millender	The Jungle (657); Indianapolis, IN
February 8, 2025; 7:00 pm, ESPN+		at Wright State	L 73–91	8–18 (4–11)	26 – Craig	12 – Goode	6 – Millender	Nutter Center (4,640); Fairborn, OH
February 12, 2025; 6:30 pm, ESPN+		Oakland	L 67–82	8–19 (4–12)	26 – Walker	9 – Goode	4 – Millender	The Jungle (709); Indianapolis, IN
February 19, 2025; 7:00 pm, ESPN+		at Detroit Mercy	W 80–71	9–19 (5–12)	28 – Zilinskas	16 – Craig	5 – Millender	Calihan Hall (1,113); Detroit, MI
February 23, 2025; 1:00 pm, ESPN+		at Northern Kentucky	L 67–71	9–20 (5–13)	22 – Craig	9 – Goode	7 – Millender	Truist Arena (2,535); Highland Heights, KY
February 27, 2025; 6:30 pm, ESPN+		Robert Morris	L 68–82	9–21 (5–14)	17 – Tied	7 – Craig	4 – Millender	The Jungle (1,280); Indianapolis, IN
March 1, 2025; 2:30 pm, ESPN+		Wright State	W 91–84	10–21 (6–14)	31 – Zilinskas	13 – Garner	5 – Walker	Corteva Coliseum (1,448); Indianapolis, IN
Horizon League tournament
March 4, 2025; 7:00 pm, ESPN+	(9)	at (8) Wright State; First round	L 85–98	10–22	20 – Walker	7 – Craig	5 – Craig	Nutter Center (2,488); Fairborn, OH
*Non-conference game. ^{#}Rankings from AP Poll. (#) Tournament seedings in parentheses. All times are in Eastern.
