= 2024–25 Youngstown State Penguins men's basketball team =

American college basketball season

2024–25 Youngstown State Penguins men's basketball
- Conference: Horizon League
- Record: 21–13 (13–7 Horizon)
- Head coach: Ethan Faulkner (1st season)
- Associate head coach: Dwaine Osborne
- Assistant coaches: Danny Reese; Anthony Johnson; Mark Richmond
- Home arena: Beeghly Center

2024–25 Horizon League men's basketball standings
	Conf.				Overall
Team	W		L	PCT	W		L	PCT
Robert Morris †	15	–	5	.750	26	–	9	.743
Cleveland State	14	–	6	.700	23	–	13	.639
Milwaukee	14	–	6	.700	21	–	11	.656
Youngstown State	13	–	7	.650	21	–	13	.618
Purdue Fort Wayne	12	–	8	.600	19	–	13	.594
Oakland	11	–	9	.550	16	–	18	.471
Northern Kentucky	11	–	9	.550	17	–	16	.515
Wright State	8	–	12	.400	15	–	18	.455
IU Indy	6	–	14	.300	10	–	22	.313
Detroit Mercy	4	–	16	.200	8	–	24	.250
Green Bay	2	–	18	.100	4	–	28	.125
† 2025 Horizon League tournament winner

The 2024–25 Youngstown State Penguins men's basketball team represented Youngstown State University during the 2024–25 NCAA Division I men's basketball season. The Penguins, led by first-year head coach Ethan Faulkner, played their home games at the Beeghly Center located in Youngstown, Ohio as members of the Horizon League.

== Previous season ==
The Penguins finished the 2023–24 season 22–10, 14–6 in Horizon League play, to finish in second place. They were upset by Cleveland State in the quarterfinals of the Horizon League tournament.

On March 30, 2024, it was announced that head coach Jerrod Calhoun would be accepting the head coaching position at Utah State. On April 1, assistant coach Ethan Faulkner was named Calhoun's successor.

== Roster ==
2024–25 Youngstown State Penguins men's basketball team
Players
Coaches

Pos.	#	Name	Height	Weight	Year	Previous school	Hometown
G	0	Jason Nelson	5 ft 10 in (1.78 m)	175 lb (79 kg)	Jr	VCU	Richmond, VA
G	1	Ty Harper (5Y)	6 ft 3 in (1.91 m)	175 lb (79 kg)	Sr	The Master's	Norcross, GA
F	2	Christian Kirkland	6 ft 9 in (2.06 m)	215 lb (98 kg)	Fr	Friends Select School	Philadelphia, PA
G	3	EJ Farmer	6 ft 5 in (1.96 m)	185 lb (84 kg)	Sr	Toledo	Cleveland, OH
G	4	Elijah Guillory	6 ft 5 in (1.96 m)	190 lb (86 kg)	Fr	Moon Area HS	Moon, PA
G	5	Siem Uijtendaal (5Y)	6 ft 6 in (1.98 m)	185 lb (84 kg)	Sr	Canisius	Haarlem, Netherlands
G	6	Shaheed Solebo	6 ft 4 in (1.93 m)	185 lb (84 kg)	Fr	Lane Tech	Chicago, IL
G	8	Nik Hendrix	6 ft 1 in (1.85 m)	190 lb (86 kg)	So	Hubbard HS	Hubbard, OH
C	10	Imanuel Zorgvol	7 ft 0 in (2.13 m)	215 lb (98 kg)	Jr	Northern Kentucky	Paramaribo, Suriname
G	11	Juwan Maxey	6 ft 1 in (1.85 m)	165 lb (75 kg)	Jr	Macomb CC	Detroit, MI
G	13	David Wilkerson	6 ft 4 in (1.93 m)	190 lb (86 kg)	So	Spartanburg Methodist	Lansing, MI
G	14	Dante DePante	6 ft 4 in (1.93 m)	200 lb (91 kg)	Fr	Central Catholic HS	Pittsburgh, PA
F	15	Cris Carroll	6 ft 6 in (1.98 m)	230 lb (104 kg)	Jr	Coffeyville CC	Tallahassee, FL
G	25	Kevin Hamilton	5 ft 7 in (1.7 m)	155 lb (70 kg)	So	Arkansas–Fort Smith	Akron, OH
G	44	Nico Galette (5Y)	6 ft 6 in (1.98 m)	210 lb (95 kg)	Sr	Sacred Heart	Rahway, NJ
C	45	Gabe Dynes	7 ft 3 in (2.21 m)	225 lb (102 kg)	So	Simon Kenton HS	Independence, KY

Head coach

- Ethan Faulkner (Northern Kentucky)

Assistant coach(es)

- Dwaine Osborne (Clearwater Christian)
- Danny Reese (Wooster)
- Anthony Johnson (Clemson)
- Mark Richmond (West Virginia)

Legend

- (C) Team captain
- (S) Suspended
- (I) Ineligible
- (W) Walk-on
- (5Y) Fifth-year senior
- Injured
- Current redshirt

Roster
Last update: November 6, 2024

== Schedule and results ==
Date time, TV	Rank^{#}	Opponent^{#}	Result	Record	Site (attendance) city, state
Regular season
November 4, 2024*; 7:35 p.m., ESPN+		Westminster (PA)	Canceled due to power outage		Beeghly Center; Youngstown, OH
November 9, 2024*; 8:00 p.m., NEC Front Row		at Chicago State	W 80–60	1–0	Jones Convocation Center (525); Chicago, IL
November 11, 2024*; 6:00 p.m., BTN		at No. 21 Ohio State	L 47–81	1–1	Value City Arena (10,797); Columbus, OH
November 16, 2024*; 2:00 p.m., ACCNX/ESPN+		at Syracuse	L 95–104 ^{2OT}	1–2	JMA Wireless Dome (19,610); Syracuse, NY
November 21, 2024*; 5:00 p.m.		vs. Monmouth; Axe 'Em Classic	W 72–62	2–2	William R. Johnson Coliseum (117); Nacogdoches, TX
November 22, 2024*; 3:30 p.m.		vs. Presbyterian; Axe 'Em Classic	L 42–67	2–3	William R. Johnson Coliseum (103); Nacogdoches, TX
November 23, 2024*; 7:00 p.m.		at Stephen F. Austin; Axe 'Em Classic	L 57–64	2–4	William R. Johnson Coliseum (1,925); Nacogdoches, TX
November 27, 2024*; 2:00 p.m., ESPN+		Western Michigan	L 62–73	2–5	Beeghly Center (1,543); Youngstown, OH
November 30, 2024*; 6:00 p.m., ESPN+		Bethany (WV)	W 128–60	3–5	Beeghly Center (1,377); Youngstown, OH
December 4, 2024; 7:00 p.m., ESPN+		at Robert Morris	W 72–58	4–5 (1–0)	UPMC Events Center (1,010); Moon Township, PA
December 7, 2024; 2:00 p.m., ESPN+		Oakland	W 66–50	5–5 (2–0)	Beeghly Center (1,577); Youngstown, OH
December 14, 2024*; 1:00 p.m., ESPN+		Toledo	W 93–87	6–5	Beeghly Center (2,416); Youngstown, OH
December 18, 2024; 7:00 p.m., ESPN+		at Wright State	W 80–70	7–5 (3–0)	Nutter Center (3,932); Fairborn, OH
December 21, 2024*; 1:00 p.m., ESPN+		at USC Upstate	W 72–64	8–5	G. B. Hodge Center (165); Spartanburg, SC
December 29, 2024; 2:00 p.m., ESPN+		Detroit Mercy	W 73–64	9–5 (4–0)	Beeghly Center (1,857); Youngstown, OH
January 1, 2025; 12:00 p.m., ESPN+		at IU Indy	W 77–61	10–5 (5–0)	Indiana Farmers Coliseum (562); Indianapolis, IN
January 4, 2025; 7:00 p.m., ESPN+		at Purdue Fort Wayne	L 81–90	10–6 (5–1)	Memorial Coliseum (1,375); Fort Wayne, IN
January 8, 2025; 6:30 p.m., ESPN+		Northern Kentucky	W 72–61	11–6 (6–1)	Beeghly Center (1,639); Youngstown, OH
January 11, 2025; 2:00 p.m., ESPN+		Cleveland State	L 72–80	11–7 (6–2)	Beeghly Center (1,905); Youngstown, OH
January 17, 2025; 8:00 p.m., ESPN+		at Milwaukee	L 64–79	11–8 (6–3)	UWM Panther Arena (1,957); Milwaukee, WI
January 19, 2025; 1:00 p.m., ESPN+		at Green Bay	W 73–69	12–8 (7–3)	Resch Center (1,651); Ashwaubenon, WI
January 22, 2025; 6:30 p.m., ESPN+		Robert Morris	L 70–72	12–9 (7–4)	Beeghly Center (1,773); Youngstown, OH
January 24, 2025*; 11:00 a.m., ESPN+		Penn State Shenango	W 112–63	13–9	Beeghly Center (1,314); Youngstown, OH
January 30, 2025; 6:30 p.m., ESPN+		Wright State	W 88–86	14–9 (8–4)	Beeghly Center (1,570); Youngstown, OH
February 1, 2025; 2:00 p.m., ESPN+		IU Indy	L 79–84	14–10 (8–5)	Beeghly Center (2,843); Youngstown, OH
February 6, 2025; 7:00 p.m., ESPN+		at Oakland	W 84–75	15–10 (9–5)	OU Credit Union O'rena (2,237); Auburn Hills, MI
February 8, 2025; 1:00 p.m., ESPN+		at Detroit Mercy	W 87–72	16–10 (10–5)	Calihan Hall (1,071); Detroit, MI
February 12, 2025; 6:30 p.m., ESPN+		Purdue Fort Wayne	W 93–71	17–10 (11–5)	Beeghly Center (2,173); Youngstown, OH
February 16, 2025; 2:00 p.m., ESPNU		at Cleveland State	W 68–60	18–10 (12–5)	Wolstein Center (2,554); Cleveland, OH
February 21, 2025; 6:30 p.m., ESPN+		Milwaukee	L 74–84	18–11 (12–6)	Beeghly Center (2,609); Youngstown, OH
February 23, 2025; 2:00 p.m., ESPN+		Green Bay	W 81–77	19–11 (13–6)	Beeghly Center (2,135); Youngstown, OH
March 1, 2025; 1:00 p.m., ESPN+		at Northern Kentucky	L 79–88	19–12 (13–7)	Truist Arena (4,030); Highland Heights, KY
Horizon League tournament
March 6, 2025; 7:00 p.m., ESPN+	(4)	(5) Purdue Fort Wayne; Quarterfinals	W 72–67	20–12	Beeghly Center (2,605); Youngstown, OH
March 10, 2025; 9:30 p.m., ESPN2	(4)	vs. (2) Cleveland State; Semifinals	W 56–54	21–12	Corteva Coliseum (1,775); Indianapolis, IN
March 11, 2025; 7:00 p.m., ESPN/ESPN2	(4)	vs. (1) Robert Morris; Championship	L 78–89	21–13	Corteva Coliseum (2,273); Indianapolis, IN
*Non-conference game. ^{#}Rankings from AP poll. (#) Tournament seedings in parentheses. All times are in Eastern.
