= 2024–25 Robert Morris Colonials men's basketball team =

American college basketball season

2024–25 Robert Morris Colonials men's basketball

Horizon League regular season and tournament champions

NCAA tournament, First Round
- Conference: Horizon League
- Record: 26–9 (15–5 Horizon)
- Head coach: Andrew Toole (15th season)
- Assistant coaches: Kim Lewis; George Aramide; Anthony Richards
- Home arena: UPMC Events Center

2024–25 Horizon League men's basketball standings
	Conf.				Overall
Team	W		L	PCT	W		L	PCT
Robert Morris †	15	–	5	.750	26	–	9	.743
Cleveland State	14	–	6	.700	23	–	13	.639
Milwaukee	14	–	6	.700	21	–	11	.656
Youngstown State	13	–	7	.650	21	–	13	.618
Purdue Fort Wayne	12	–	8	.600	19	–	13	.594
Oakland	11	–	9	.550	16	–	18	.471
Northern Kentucky	11	–	9	.550	17	–	16	.515
Wright State	8	–	12	.400	15	–	18	.455
IU Indy	6	–	14	.300	10	–	22	.313
Detroit Mercy	4	–	16	.200	8	–	24	.250
Green Bay	2	–	18	.100	4	–	28	.125
† 2025 Horizon League tournament winner

The 2024–25 Robert Morris Colonials men's basketball team represented Robert Morris University during the 2024–25 NCAA Division I men's basketball season. The Colonials, led by 15th-year head coach Andrew Toole, played their home games at the UPMC Events Center located in Moon Township, Pennsylvania as members of the Horizon League. The team qualified for the NCAA tournament for the first time since 2015.

== Previous season ==
The Colonials finished the 2023–24 season 10–22, 6–14 in Horizon League play to finish in ninth place. They were defeated by Purdue Fort Wayne in the first round of the Horizon League tournament.

== Offseason ==
=== Departures ===
Departures
Name	Number	Pos.	Height	Weight	Year	Hometown	Notes
Markeese Hastings	0	F	6'7"	195	Graduate Student	Grand Rapids, Michigan	Graduated
TJ Wainwright	5	G	6'3"	180	Sophomore	Los Angeles, California	Transferred to Long Beach State
Alfredo Boglio	6	G	6'3"	175	Freshman	Novara, Italy	Left the team to play professionally for Pistoia Basket 2000 in Italy
Stephaun Walker	11	F	6'7"	205	Sophomore	Dickinson, North Dakota	Transferred to Old Dominion
Jackson Last	12	G	6'5"	195	Senior	Hurricane, Utah	Transferred to Chaminade
Josh Corbin	32	G	6'3"	190	Senior	Gahanna, Ohio	Transferred to UNC Wilmington
Ben Krystkowiak	42	G	6'4"	175	Sophomore	San Diego, California	Transferred to Corban
Trey James	50	F	6'9"	235	Junior	Inez, Kentucky	

=== Incoming transfers ===
Incoming transfers
Name	Number	Pos.	Height	Weight	Year	Hometown	Previous School
Ryan Prather Jr.	2	G/F	6'5"	205	(redshirt) Sophomore	Clarksburg, Maryland	Akron
Amarion Dickerson	3	G/F	6'7"	185	Junior	Cleveland, Ohio	Mineral Area College
Josh Omojafo	4	G	6'5"	200	Junior	Hamilton, Ontario	Gannon
Kam Woods	8	G	6'2"	185	Senior	Bessemer, Alabama	NC State
DJ Smith	11	G	6'0"	160	Junior	North Little Rock, Arkansas	Bowling Green
Ismael Plet	45	F	6'8"	230	Graduate Student	Amsterdam, Netherlands	Arkansas–Pine Bluff

=== Recruiting class ===
College recruiting information
Name	Hometown	School	Height	Weight	Commit date
Maurio Hanson Jr. G	Charlotte, North Carolina	Julius L. Chambers High School	6 ft 7 in (2.01 m)	200 lb (91 kg)	May 16, 2024
Maurio Hanson Jr. G	Recruit ratings: Scout: Rivals: 247Sports: (NR)				
Dilen Miller; G	Chandler, Arizona	Inspire Prep	6 ft 4 in (1.93 m)	185 lb (84 kg)	May 22, 2024
Dilen Miller; G	Recruit ratings: Scout: Rivals: 247Sports: (NR)				
Overall recruit ranking:
Note: In many cases, Scout, Rivals, 247Sports, On3, and ESPN may conflict in their listings of height and weight.; In these cases, the average was taken. ESPN grades are on a 100-point scale.; Sources: "2024 Team Ranking". Rivals.

== Roster ==
2024–25 Robert Morris Colonials men's basketball team
Players
Coaches

Pos.	#	Name	Height	Weight	Year	Previous school	Hometown
G	0	Tanner O'Grady	6 ft 0 in (1.83 m)	175 lb (79 kg)	Jr	Upper St. Clair High School	Pittsburgh, Pennsylvania
G	1	Justice Williams	6 ft 4 in (1.93 m)	175 lb (79 kg)	Sr	LSU	Philadelphia, Pennsylvania
G/F	2	Ryan Prather Jr.	6 ft 5 in (1.96 m)	205 lb (93 kg)	RS So	Akron	Clarksburg, Maryland
G/F	3	Amarion Dickerson	6 ft 7 in (2.01 m)	185 lb (84 kg)	Jr	Mineral Area College	Cleveland, Ohio
G	4	Josh Omojafo	6 ft 5 in (1.96 m)	200 lb (91 kg)	Jr	Gannon	Hamilton, Ontario
G/F	6	Cyril Arvanitis	6 ft 3 in (1.91 m)	185 lb (84 kg)	Jr	Red Bank Catholic High School	Elberon, New Jersey
F	7	Alvaro Folgueiras	6 ft 9 in (2.06 m)	215 lb (98 kg)	So	DME Academy	Málaga, Spain
G	8	Kam Woods	6 ft 2 in (1.88 m)	185 lb (84 kg)	Sr	NC State	Bessemer, Alabama
G	10	Dilen Miller	6 ft 4 in (1.93 m)	185 lb (84 kg)	Fr	Inspire Prep	Chandler, Arizona
G	11	DJ Smith	6 ft 0 in (1.83 m)	160 lb (73 kg)	Jr	Bowling Green	North Little Rock, Arkansas
F	13	Antallah Sandlin-El	6 ft 8 in (2.03 m)	205 lb (93 kg)	RS Fr	Lincoln North Star High School	Lincoln, Nebraska
G	14	Vasilije Serafimoski	6 ft 6 in (1.98 m)	195 lb (88 kg)	Jr	La Roche	Gostivar, North Macedonia
F	23	Chris Ford	6 ft 5 in (1.96 m)	200 lb (91 kg)	Sr	Davidson	Charlotte, North Carolina
F	31	Maurio Hanson Jr.	6 ft 7 in (2.01 m)	200 lb (91 kg)	Fr	Chambers High School	Charlotte, North Carolina
F	45	Ismael Plet	6 ft 8 in (2.03 m)	230 lb (104 kg)	GS	Arkansas–Pine Bluff	Amsterdam, Netherlands

Head coach

- Andrew Toole (Penn)

Assistant coach(es)

- Kim Lewis (Tulane)
- George Aramide (Thompson Rivers)
- Anthony Richards (Le Moyne)

Legend

- (C) Team captain
- (S) Suspended
- (I) Ineligible
- (W) Walk-on
- Injured
- Current redshirt

Roster
Last update: November 7, 2024

== Schedule and results ==
Date time, TV	Rank^{#}	Opponent^{#}	Result	Record	High points	High rebounds	High assists	Site (attendance) city, state
Exhibition
October 27, 2024*; 12:00 pm		at Villanova	L 73–87	–	15 – Tied	6 – Tied	6 – Woods	Finneran Pavilion (2,125); Villanova, PA
Regular season
November 4, 2024*; 7:00 pm, ESPN+		at West Virginia	L 59–87	0–1	13 – Omojafo	10 – Folgueiras	3 – Woods	WVU Coliseum (9,229); Morgantown, WV
November 7, 2024*; 6:30 pm, FloHoops		at Delaware	L 77–81	0–2	22 – Woods	7 – Tied	6 – Woods	Bob Carpenter Center (1,402); Newark, DE
November 10, 2024*; 2:00 pm, ESPN+		Chatham	W 79–51	1–2	19 – Tied	13 – Folgueiras	5 – Smith	UPMC Events Center (806); Moon Township, PA
November 14, 2024*; 7:00 pm, ESPN+		Stonehill; Urban-Bennett Invitational	W 63–51	2–2	15 – Omojafo	13 – Folgueiras	3 – Smith	UPMC Events Center (1,297); Moon Township, PA
November 15, 2024*; 7:00 pm, ESPN+		Lindenwood; Urban-Bennett Invitational	W 67–53	3–2	17 – Omojafo	14 – Folgueiras	7 – Smith	UPMC Events Center (1,014); Moon Township, PA
November 17, 2024*; 4:00 pm, ESPN+		New Orleans; Urban-Bennett Invitational	W 73–62	4–2	20 – Smith	13 – Folgueiras	4 – Folgueiras	UPMC Events Center (906); Moon Township, PA
November 21, 2024*; 6:00 pm, ESPN+		at Cornell	W 86–76	5–2	19 – Folgueiras	12 – Folgueiras	8 – Omojafo	Newman Arena; Ithaca, NY
November 27, 2024*; 4:00 pm, ESPN+		Canisius	W 72–64	6–2	19 – Dickerson	13 – Dickerson	4 – Dickerson	UPMC Events Center (685); Moon Township, PA
November 30, 2024*; 2:00 pm, ESPN+		at Ohio	L 68–84	6–3	15 – Omojafo	7 – Tied	3 – Prather Jr.	Convocation Center; Athens, OH
December 4, 2024; 7:00 pm, ESPN+		Youngstown State	L 58–72	6–4 (0–1)	14 – Woods	11 – Folgueiras	5 – Woods	UPMC Events Center (1,303); Moon Township, PA
December 8, 2024; 2:00 pm, ESPN+		at Purdue Fort Wayne	L 77–82	6–5 (0–2)	25 – Folgueiras	12 – Tied	5 – Smith	Memorial Coliseum (1,358); Fort Wayne, IN
December 17, 2024*; 7:00 pm, ESPN+		Towson	W 68–67	7–5	18 – Dickerson	8 – Folgueiras	4 – Woods	UPMC Events Center (754); Moon Township, PA
December 21, 2024*; 1:00 pm, ESPN+		Saint Francis	W 90–77	8–5	27 – Folgueiras	16 – Folgueiras	7 – Woods	UPMC Events Center (922); Moon Township, PA
December 29, 2024; 2:00 pm, ESPN+		Northern Kentucky	W 97–93 ^{3OT}	9–5 (1–2)	27 – Dickerson	19 – Folgueiras	10 – Woods	UPMC Events Center (908); Moon Township, PA
January 2, 2025; 7:00 pm, ESPN+		at Detroit Mercy	L 76–78 ^{OT}	9–6 (1–3)	20 – Tied	8 – Tied	7 – Folgueiras	Calihan Hall (1,024); Detroit, MI
January 4, 2025; 3:00 pm, ESPN+		at Oakland	W 79–71	10–6 (2–3)	29 – Woods	10 – Dickerson	4 – Tied	OU Credit Union O'rena (3,029); Auburn Hills, MI
January 8, 2025; 7:00 pm, ESPN+		Cleveland State	L 69–80	10–7 (2–4)	18 – Woods	7 – Dickerson	6 – Woods	UPMC Events Center (646); Moon Township, PA
January 12, 2025; 2:00 pm, ESPN+		Wright State	W 75–72	11–7 (3–4)	16 – Folgueiras	7 – Tied	5 – Woods	UPMC Events Center (824); Moon Township, PA
January 17, 2025; 7:00 pm, ESPN+		at Green Bay	W 89–67	12–7 (4–4)	22 – Dickerson	7 – Folgueiras	6 – Tied	Resch Center (2,007); Ashwaubenon, WI
January 19, 2025; 3:00 pm, ESPN+		at Milwaukee	W 81–79	13–7 (5–4)	15 – Tied	5 – Tied	8 – Woods	UWM Panther Arena (1,893); Milwaukee, WI
January 22, 2025; 6:30 pm, ESPN+		at Youngstown State	W 72–70	14–7 (6–4)	17 – Woods	8 – Plet	7 – Woods	Beeghly Center (1,773); Youngstown, OH
January 25, 2025; 2:00 pm, ESPN+		Oakland	W 73–71	15–7 (7–4)	17 – Dickerson	14 – Folgueiras	7 – Folgueiras	UPMC Events Center (1,268); Moon Township, PA
January 30, 2025; 7:00 pm, ESPN+		IU Indy	W 106–53	16–7 (8–4)	18 – Dickerson	13 – Folgueiras	6 – Folgueiras	UPMC Events Center (1,078); Moon Township, PA
February 2, 2025; 2:00 pm, ESPN+		at Wright State	L 64–66	16–8 (8–5)	22 – Woods	7 – Dickerson	3 – Woods	Nutter Center (3,579); Fairborn, OH
February 5, 2025; 7:00 pm, ESPN+		Detroit Mercy	W 71–56	17–8 (9–5)	16 – Folgueiras	7 – Dickerson	6 – Woods	UPMC Events Center (1,576); Moon Township, PA
February 8, 2025; 2:00 pm, ESPN+		at Northern Kentucky	W 81–76	18–8 (10–5)	35 – Folgueiras	10 – Folgueiras	7 – Woods	Truist Arena (3,006); Highland Heights, KY
February 12, 2025; 7:00 pm, ESPN+		at Cleveland State	W 68–59	19–8 (11–5)	21 – Dickerson	10 – Folgueiras	7 – Woods	Wolstein Center (1,654); Cleveland, OH
February 15, 2025; 2:00 pm, ESPN+		Purdue Fort Wayne	W 76–69	20–8 (12–5)	22 – Folgueiras	7 – Tied	5 – Smith	UPMC Events Center (1,336); Moon Township, PA
February 21, 2025; 7:00 pm, ESPN+		Green Bay	W 94–85	21–8 (13–5)	22 – Tied	10 – Woods	9 – Woods	UPMC Events Center (1,172); Moon Township, PA
February 23, 2025; 2:00 pm, ESPN+		Milwaukee	W 72–59	22–8 (14–5)	17 – Folgueiras	12 – Folgueiras	11 – Woods	UPMC Events Center (1,611); Moon Township, PA
February 27, 2025; 6:30 pm, ESPN+		at IU Indy	W 82–68	23–8 (15–5)	27 – Omojafo	11 – Woods	4 – Tied	The Jungle (1,280); Indianapolis, IN
Horizon League tournament
March 6, 2025; 8:00 pm, ESPN+	(1)	(8) Wright State; Quarterfinals	W 83–62	24–8	19 – Woods	10 – Folgueiras	7 – Smith	UPMC Events Center (4,058); Moon Township, PA
March 10, 2025; 7:00 pm, ESPNU	(1)	vs. (6) Oakland; Semifinals	W 79–76 ^{OT}	25–8	23 – Woods	5 – Tied	7 – Woods	Corteva Coliseum; Indianapolis, IN
March 11, 2025; 7:00 pm, ESPN	(1)	vs. (4) Youngstown State; Championship	W 89–78	26–8	24 – Omojafo	13 – Omojafo	7 – Folgueiras	Corteva Coliseum (2,273); Indianapolis, IN
NCAA tournament
March 21, 2025*; 12:40 pm, TruTV	(15 E)	vs. (2 E) No. 7 Alabama; First round	L 81–90	26–9	25 – Dickerson	10 – Folgueiras	7 – Woods	Rocket Arena (15,985); Cleveland, OH
*Non-conference game. ^{#}Rankings from AP Poll. (#) Tournament seedings in parentheses. E=East. All times are in Eastern.
