= 2024–25 Oakland Golden Grizzlies men's basketball team =

American college basketball season

2024–25 Oakland Golden Grizzlies men's basketball
- Conference: Horizon League
- Record: 16–18 (11–9 Horizon)
- Head coach: Greg Kampe (41st season)
- Associate head coach: Jeff Smith
- Assistant coaches: Trey McDonald; Bobby Naubert
- Home arena: OU Credit Union O'rena

2024–25 Horizon League men's basketball standings
	Conf.				Overall
Team	W		L	PCT	W		L	PCT
Robert Morris †	15	–	5	.750	26	–	9	.743
Cleveland State	14	–	6	.700	23	–	13	.639
Milwaukee	14	–	6	.700	21	–	11	.656
Youngstown State	13	–	7	.650	21	–	13	.618
Purdue Fort Wayne	12	–	8	.600	19	–	13	.594
Oakland	11	–	9	.550	16	–	18	.471
Northern Kentucky	11	–	9	.550	17	–	16	.515
Wright State	8	–	12	.400	15	–	18	.455
IU Indy	6	–	14	.300	10	–	22	.313
Detroit Mercy	4	–	16	.200	8	–	24	.250
Green Bay	2	–	18	.100	4	–	28	.125
† 2025 Horizon League tournament winner

The 2024–25 Oakland Golden Grizzlies men's basketball team represented Oakland University during the 2024–25 NCAA Division I men's basketball season. The Golden Grizzlies, led by 41st-year head coach Greg Kampe, will played their home games at the OU Credit Union O'rena in Auburn Hills, Michigan as members of the Horizon League.

With a win against Defiance College on November 4, 2024, Greg Kampe recorded his 700th career win.

== Previous season ==
The Golden Grizzlies finished the 2023–24 season 24–12, 15–5 in Horizon League play to finish as Horizon League regular season champions. They defeated Purdue Fort Wayne, Cleveland State, and Milwaukee to win the Horizon League tournament championship, punching their first ticket to the NCAA tournament since 2011. In the NCAA tournament, they received the #14 seed in the South Region, where they would upset #3 region seed Kentucky in the First Round, the second time in the last three tournaments in which Kentucky fell to a double digit seed, before falling to Cinderella NC State in the Second Round.

== Roster ==
2024–25 Oakland Golden Grizzlies men's basketball team
Players
Coaches

Pos.	#	Name	Height	Weight	Year	Previous school	Hometown
G	0	Nassim Mashhour	6 ft 4 in (1.93 m)	184 lb (83 kg)	Fr	Dearborn HS	Dearborn, Michigan
G	1	Jaylen Jones	6 ft 0 in (1.83 m)	156 lb (71 kg)	So	Tennessee State	Nashville, Tennessee
G	2	Jeremiah Bembry	6 ft 5 in (1.96 m)	185 lb (84 kg)	RS So	West Virginia	Brooklyn, New York
G	3	Luke Gelow	6 ft 3 in (1.91 m)	185 lb (84 kg)	Fr	Gaylord HS	Gaylord, Michigan
G	4	Chang Hoth	6 ft 2 in (1.88 m)	153 lb (69 kg)	Jr	Western Oklahoma State	Saint Paul, Minnesota
G	5	Jack Hoth	6 ft 2 in (1.88 m)	158 lb (72 kg)	Jr	Western Oklahoma State	Saint Paul, Minnesota
G	6	Malcolm Christie	6 ft 5 in (1.96 m)	185 lb (84 kg)	Sr	Dalhousie	Fredericton, New Brunswick
G/F	7	Isaiah Jones	6 ft 7 in (2.01 m)	229 lb (104 kg)	Jr	Detroit Mercy	Nashville, Tennessee
G	10	DQ Cole	6 ft 3 in (1.91 m)	222 lb (101 kg)	Sr	Henry Ford College	Pontiac, Michigan
G/F	11	Jayson Woodrich	6 ft 7 in (2.01 m)	205 lb (93 kg)	GS	Cleveland State	Cleveland, Ohio
F	12	Buru Naivalurua	6 ft 6 in (1.98 m)	239 lb (108 kg)	Sr	Garden City CC	Sydney, Australia
G	13	Warren Marshall IV	6 ft 5 in (1.96 m)	165 lb (75 kg)	Fr	Brother Rice HS	Auburn Hills, Michigan
F	22	Deng Majak	6 ft 9 in (2.06 m)	192 lb (87 kg)	Jr	Indian River State	Turalei, South Sudan
F	23	Allen Mukeba	6 ft 6 in (1.98 m)	247 lb (112 kg)	GS	Kansas City	Charleroi, Belgium
F	24	Zavier Banks	6 ft 5 in (1.96 m)	211 lb (96 kg)	RS Fr	Detroit Jesuit HS	Pleasant Ridge, Michigan
F	25	Cooper Craggs	6 ft 5 in (1.96 m)	224 lb (102 kg)	RS So	Novi Catholic Central HS	Northville, Michigan

Head coach

- Greg Kampe (Bowling Green)

Assistant coach(es)

- Jeff Smith (Southeast Missouri State)
- Trey McDonald (Ohio State)
- Bobby Naubert (Madonna)

Legend

- (C) Team captain
- (S) Suspended
- (I) Ineligible
- (W) Walk-on
- Injured
- Current redshirt

Roster
Last update: November 5, 2024

== Schedule and results ==
Date time, TV	Rank^{#}	Opponent^{#}	Result	Record	Site (attendance) city, state
Exhibition
October 20, 2024*; 5:00 pm, BTN+		vs. Michigan	L 48–92	–	Little Caesars Arena (4,025); Detroit, MI
October 25, 2024*; 7:00 pm		at Rochester Christian	W 87–74	–	Garth Pleasant Arena (1,188); Rochester Hills, MI
Regular season
November 4, 2024*; 7:00 pm, ESPN+		Defiance	W 75–52	1–0	OU Credit Union O'rena (1,306); Auburn Hills, MI
November 6, 2024*; 9:00 pm, MWN		at Boise State	L 43–87	1–1	ExtraMile Arena (10,626); Boise, ID
November 13, 2024*; 9:00 pm, BTN		at Illinois	L 54–66	1–2	State Farm Center (15,299); Champaign, IL
November 16, 2024*; 6:00 pm, ESPN+		at No. 1 Kansas	L 57–78	1–3	Allen Fieldhouse (15,300); Lawrence, KS
November 21, 2024*; 7:00 pm, ESPN+		Eastern Michigan	L 64–68	1–4	OU Credit Union O'rena (1,941); Auburn Hills, MI
November 30, 2024*; 7:00 pm, ESPN+		at Toledo	W 85–52	2–4	Savage Arena (4,008); Toledo, OH
December 5, 2024; 7:00 pm, ESPN+		Wright State	W 66–64	3–4 (1–0)	OU Credit Union O'rena; Auburn Hills, MI
December 7, 2024; 2:00 pm, ESPN+		at Youngstown State	L 50–66	3–5 (1–1)	Beeghly Center (1,577); Youngstown, OH
December 17, 2024*; 7:00 pm, ESPN2		vs. No. 20 Michigan State	L 58–77	3–6	Little Caesars Arena (12,011); Detroit, MI
December 19, 2024; 7:00 pm, ESPN+		at Cleveland State	L 75–92	3–7 (1–2)	Wolstein Center (1,205); Cleveland, OH
December 22, 2024*; 5:00 pm, ESPN2		vs. Loyola Chicago; Diamond Head Classic First Round	W 72–71	4–7	Stan Sheriff Center; Honolulu, HI
December 23, 2024*; 8:00 pm, ESPN2		vs. Oregon State; Diamond Head Classic Semifinals	L 74–80 ^{OT}	4–8	Stan Sheriff Center; Honolulu, HI
December 25, 2024*; 5:30 pm, ESPN2		at Hawaiʻi; Diamond Head Classic 3rd Place Game	L 70–73 ^{OT}	4–9	Stan Sheriff Center; Honolulu, HI
December 30, 2024*; 7:00 pm, SECN+		at No. 23 Arkansas	L 62–92	4–10	Bud Walton Arena (19,200); Fayetteville, AR
January 2, 2025; 7:00 pm, ESPN+		Milwaukee	W 65–49	5–10 (2–2)	OU Credit Union O'rena (1,860); Auburn Hills, MI
January 4, 2025; 3:00 pm, ESPN+		Robert Morris	L 71–79	5–11 (2–3)	OU Credit Union O'rena (3,029); Auburn Hills, MI
January 9, 2025; 7:00 pm, ESPN+		at Wright State	L 62–66	5–12 (2–4)	Nutter Center (3,230); Fairborn, OH
January 11, 2025; 6:00 pm, ESPN+		at Northern Kentucky	W 68–53	6–12 (3–4)	Truist Arena (3,512); Highland Heights, KY
January 15, 2025; 7:00 pm, ESPN+		IU Indy	W 72–59	7–12 (4–4)	OU Credit Union O'rena (2,037); Auburn Hills, MI
January 18, 2025; 1:00 pm, ESPN+		at Detroit Mercy; Metro Series	W 65–59	8–12 (5–4)	Calihan Hall (2,047); Detroit, MI
January 22, 2025; 7:00 pm, ESPN+		Purdue Fort Wayne	W 76–72	9–12 (6–4)	OU Credit Union O'rena (2,281); Auburn Hills, MI
January 25, 2025; 2:00 pm, ESPN+		at Robert Morris	L 71–73	9–13 (6–5)	UPMC Events Center (1,268); Moon Township, PA
January 30, 2025; 7:00 pm, ESPN+		Green Bay	W 68–54	10–13 (7–5)	OU Credit Union O'rena (2,071); Auburn Hills, MI
February 1, 2025; 4:00 pm, ESPN+		Northern Kentucky	L 75–84	10–14 (7–6)	OU Credit Union O'rena (2,993); Auburn Hills, MI
February 6, 2025; 7:00 pm, ESPN+		Youngstown State	L 75–84	10–15 (7–7)	OU Credit Union O'rena (2,237); Auburn Hills, MI
February 12, 2025; 7:00 pm, ESPN+		at IU Indy	W 82–67	11–15 (8–7)	The Jungle (709); Indianapolis, IN
February 16, 2025; 3:00 pm, ESPN+		Detroit Mercy; Metro Series	W 93–83 ^{OT}	12–15 (9–7)	OU Credit Union O'rena (2,581); Auburn Hills, MI
February 21, 2025; 7:00 pm, ESPN+		at Purdue Fort Wayne	L 66–80	12–16 (9–8)	Gates Sports Center (1,147); Fort Wayne, IN
February 23, 2025; 3:00 pm, ESPN+		Cleveland State	W 91–86 ^{OT}	13–16 (10–8)	OU Credit Union O'rena (2,187); Auburn Hills, MI
February 27, 2025; 8:00 pm, ESPN+		at Milwaukee	L 66–71	13–17 (10–9)	UWM Panther Arena (2,126); Milwaukee, WI
March 1, 2025; 7:00 pm, ESPN+		at Green Bay	W 87–84	14–17 (11–9)	Resch Center (2,241); Ashwaubenon, WI
Horizon League tournament
March 4, 2025; 7:00 pm, ESPN+	(6)	(11) Green Bay; First round	W 96–72	15–17	OU Credit Union O'rena (2,003); Auburn Hills, MI
March 6, 2025; 8:00 pm, ESPN+	(6)	at (3) Milwaukee; Quarterfinals	W 72–64	16–17	UWM Panther Arena (2,151); Milwaukee, WI
March 10, 2025; 7:00 pm, ESPNU	(6)	vs. (1) Robert Morris; Semifinals	L 76–79 ^{OT}	16–18	Corteva Coliseum; Indianapolis, IN
*Non-conference game. ^{#}Rankings from AP Poll. (#) Tournament seedings in parentheses. All times are in Eastern.
