= 2024–25 Northern Kentucky Norse men's basketball team =

American college basketball season

2024–25 Northern Kentucky Norse men's basketball
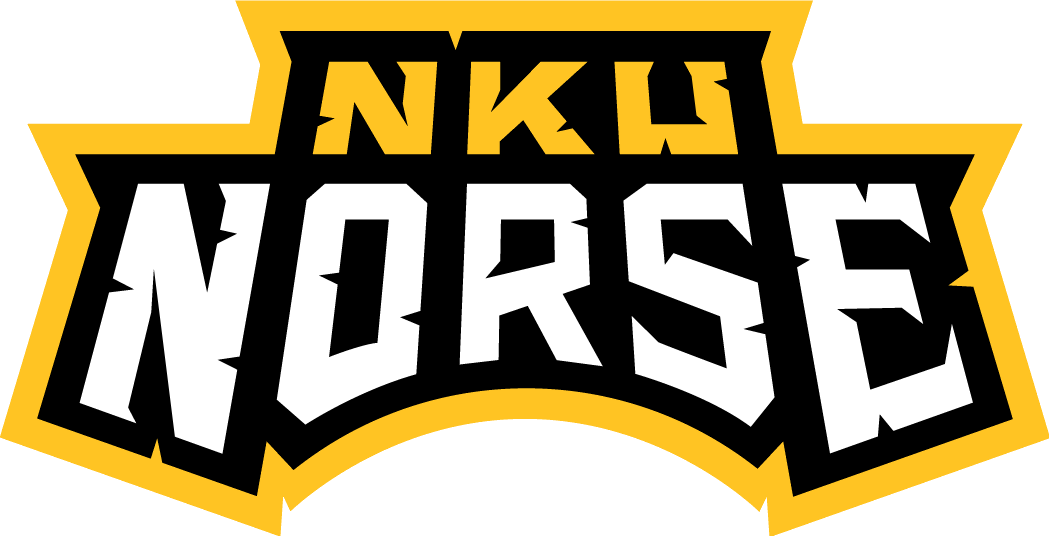
- Conference: Horizon League
- Record: 17–16 (11–9 Horizon)
- Head coach: Darrin Horn (6th season)
- Assistant coaches: Simon McCormack; David Harris; R.J. Evans
- Home arena: Truist Arena

2024–25 Horizon League men's basketball standings
	Conf.				Overall
Team	W		L	PCT	W		L	PCT
Robert Morris †	15	–	5	.750	26	–	9	.743
Cleveland State	14	–	6	.700	23	–	13	.639
Milwaukee	14	–	6	.700	21	–	11	.656
Youngstown State	13	–	7	.650	21	–	13	.618
Purdue Fort Wayne	12	–	8	.600	19	–	13	.594
Oakland	11	–	9	.550	16	–	18	.471
Northern Kentucky	11	–	9	.550	17	–	16	.515
Wright State	8	–	12	.400	15	–	18	.455
IU Indy	6	–	14	.300	10	–	22	.313
Detroit Mercy	4	–	16	.200	8	–	24	.250
Green Bay	2	–	18	.100	4	–	28	.125
† 2025 Horizon League tournament winner

The 2024–25 Northern Kentucky Norse men's basketball team represented Northern Kentucky University during the 2024–25 NCAA Division I men's basketball season. The Norse, led by sixth-year head coach Darrin Horn, played their home games at Truist Arena in Highland Heights, Kentucky as members of the Horizon League.

== Previous season ==
The Norse finished the 2023–24 season 18–15, 12–8 in Horizon League play to finish in a tie for fifth place. They defeated Wright State, before falling to Milwaukee in the semifinals of the Horizon League tournament.

== Roster ==
2024–25 Northern Kentucky Norse men's basketball team
Players
Coaches

Pos.	#	Name	Height	Weight	Year	Previous school	Hometown
G	0	Dan Gherezgher Jr.	6 ft 4 in (1.93 m)	180 lb (82 kg)	Jr	Michigan Tech	Brookfield, WI
G	1	Trey Robinson	6 ft 7 in (2.01 m)	220 lb (100 kg)	GS	Hamilton HS	Hamilton, OH
G	2	Sam Vinson	6 ft 5 in (1.96 m)	205 lb (93 kg)	Sr	Highlands HS	Fort Thomas, KY
G	4	Bryce Darbyshire	6 ft 4 in (1.93 m)	180 lb (82 kg)	So	Sycamore HS	Cincinnati, OH
F	5	LJ Wells	6 ft 8 in (2.03 m)	205 lb (93 kg)	Jr	Eau Claire Memorial HS	Eau Claire, WI
F	9	Paulius Rapolis	7 ft 0 in (2.13 m)	240 lb (109 kg)	Fr	IMG Academy	Vilnius, Lithuania
G/F	10	Donovan Rakotonanahary	6 ft 8 in (2.03 m)	—	Fr	Oak Hill Academy	Fianarantsoa, Madagascar
G	11	Randall Pettus II	6 ft 3 in (1.91 m)	185 lb (84 kg)	So	Bessemer City HS	Bessemer City, NC
G	12	Josh Dilling	6 ft 4 in (1.93 m)	190 lb (86 kg)	GS	Northern State	Oshkosh, WI
G	14	Jeramiah Israel	6 ft 3 in (1.91 m)	190 lb (86 kg)	So	Lloyd Memorial HS	Erlanger, KY
F	15	Cesar Tchilombo	6 ft 9 in (2.06 m)	215 lb (98 kg)	RS So	The John Carroll School	Goma, DR Congo
G	24	Jake Evans	6 ft 1 in (1.85 m)	190 lb (86 kg)	Sr	Male HS	Louisville, KY
G	26	Mitchel Minor	5 ft 10 in (1.78 m)	175 lb (79 kg)	Jr	Scott HS	Taylor Mill, KY
G	30	Max Hyman	6 ft 4 in (1.93 m)	175 lb (79 kg)	So	Tarleton State	Southlake, TX
G	34	Hubertas Pivorius	6 ft 2 in (1.88 m)	170 lb (77 kg)	Sr	Christopher Columbus HS	Vilnius, Lithuania
F	40	Keeyan Itejere	6 ft 9 in (2.06 m)	220 lb (100 kg)	Jr	Marquette	Knightdale, NC

Head coach

- Darrin Horn (Western Kentucky)

Assistant coach(es)

- Simon McCormack (American)
- David Harris (Ashland)
- R.J. Evans (Connecticut)

Legend

- (C) Team captain
- (S) Suspended
- (I) Ineligible
- (W) Walk-on
- Injured
- Current redshirt

Roster
Last update: November 6, 2024

== Schedule and results ==
Date time, TV	Rank^{#}	Opponent^{#}	Result	Record	Site (attendance) city, state
Regular season
November 4, 2024*; 7:00 pm, ACCNX/ESPN+		at Florida State	L 62–74	0–1	Donald L. Tucker Center (4,872); Tallahassee, FL
November 8, 2024*; 7:00 pm, B1G+		at No. 14 Purdue	L 50–72	0–2	Mackey Arena (14,876); West Lafayette, IN
November 14, 2024*; 7:00 pm, ESPN+		Nicholls	L 59–61	0–3	Truist Arena (2,345); Highland Heights, KY
November 19, 2024*; 7:00 pm, ESPN+/FDSNOH		No. 18 Cincinnati	L 60–76	0–4	Truist Arena (7,485); Highland Heights, KY
November 23, 2024*; 1:00 pm, ESPN+		Kentucky State	W 85–59	1–4	Truist Arena (1,856); Highland Heights, KY
November 27, 2024*; 1:00 pm, FloHoops		at Charleston	L 64–79	1–5	TD Arena (4,718); Charleston, SC
November 30, 2024*; 6:00 pm, ESPN+/FDSNOH		Bellarmine	W 86–70	2–5	Truist Arena (3,325); Highland Heights, KY
December 3, 2024*; 7:00 pm, ESPN+		at Akron	L 73–86	2–6	James A. Rhodes Arena (1,578); Akron, OH
December 7, 2024; 2:00 pm, ESPN+		at IU Indy	W 66–64	3–6 (1–0)	The Jungle (536); Indianapolis, IN
December 11, 2024*; 7:00 pm, ESPN+		Cumberlands	W 98–79	4–6	Truist Arena (1,721); Highland Heights, KY
December 15, 2024*; 1:00 pm, ESPN+		Norfolk State	W 71–62	5–6	Truist Arena (3,279); Highland Heights, KY
December 18, 2024; 7:00 pm, ESPN+		Detroit Mercy	W 73–60	6–6 (2–0)	Truist Arena (1,936); Highland Heights, KY
December 21, 2024*; 1:00 pm, ESPN+		South Carolina State	W 58–47	7–6	Truist Arena (1,937); Highland Heights, KY
December 29, 2024; 2:00 pm, ESPN+		at Robert Morris	L 93–97 ^{3OT}	7–7 (2–1)	UPMC Events Center (784); Moon Township, PA
January 1, 2025; 12:00 pm, ESPN+		Purdue Fort Wayne	W 69–68 ^{OT}	8–7 (3–1)	Truist Arena (1,987); Highland Heights, KY
January 4, 2025; 1:00 pm, ESPN+		Green Bay	W 78–60	9–7 (4–1)	Truist Arena (2,119); Highland Heights, KY
January 8, 2025; 6:30 pm, ESPN+		at Youngstown State	L 61–72	9–8 (4–2)	Beeghly Center (1,639); Youngstown, OH
January 11, 2025; 6:00 pm, ESPN+		Oakland	L 53–68	9–9 (4–3)	Truist Arena (3,512); Highland Heights, KY
January 15, 2025; 7:00 pm, ESPN+		at Cleveland State	L 58–76	9–10 (4–4)	Wolstein Center (1,275); Cleveland, OH
January 18, 2025; 2:00 pm, ESPN+/FDSNOH		Wright State	L 70–78	9–11 (4–5)	Truist Arena (2,743); Highland Heights, KY
January 24, 2025; 7:00 pm, ESPN+		Milwaukee	L 59–79	9–12 (4–6)	Truist Arena (2,712); Highland Heights, KY
January 30, 2025; 7:00 pm, ESPN+		at Detroit Mercy	L 57–68	9–13 (4–7)	Calihan Hall (931); Detroit, MI
February 1, 2025; 4:00 pm, ESPN+		at Oakland	W 84–75	10–13 (5–7)	OU Credit Union O'rena (2,993); Auburn Hills, MI
February 5, 2025; 7:00 pm, ESPN+		Cleveland State	W 85–75	11–13 (6–7)	Truist Arena (2,380); Highland Heights, KY
February 8, 2025; 2:00 pm, ESPN+/FDSNOH		Robert Morris	L 76–81	11–14 (6–8)	Truist Arena (3,006); Highland Heights, KY
February 14, 2025; 7:00 pm, ESPN+		at Green Bay	W 73–60	12–14 (7–8)	Kress Events Center (1,501); Green Bay, WI
February 16, 2025; 3:00 pm, ESPN+		at Milwaukee	L 70–92	12–15 (7–9)	UWM Panther Arena (2,883); Milwaukee, WI
February 21, 2025; 7:00 pm, ESPN+		at Wright State	W 80–76	13–15 (8–9)	Nutter Center (4,732); Fairborn, OH
February 23, 2025; 1:00 pm, ESPN+		IU Indy	W 71–67	14–15 (9–9)	Truist Arena (2,535); Highland Heights, KY
February 27, 2025; 7:00 pm, ESPN+		at Purdue Fort Wayne	W 79–74	15–15 (10–9)	Memorial Coliseum (1,721); Fort Wayne, IN
March 1, 2025; 1:00 pm, ESPN+		Youngstown State	W 88–79	16–15 (11–9)	Truist Arena (4,030); Highland Heights, KY
Horizon League tournament
March 4, 2025; 7:00 pm, ESPN+	(7)	(10) Detroit Mercy; First round	W 99–75	17–15	Truist Arena (1,879); Highland Heights, KY
March 6, 2025; 8:00 pm, ESPN+	(7)	at (2) Cleveland State; Quarterfinal	L 63–68	17–16	Wolstein Center (1,465); Cleveland, OH
*Non-conference game. ^{#}Rankings from AP Poll. (#) Tournament seedings in parentheses. All times are in Eastern.
