= 2024–25 Wright State Raiders men's basketball team =

American college basketball season

2024–25 Wright State Raiders men's basketball
- Conference: Horizon League
- Record: 15–18 (8–12 Horizon)
- Head coach: Clint Sargent (1st season)
- Assistant coaches: Dan Beré; Travis Trice; Jaaron Simmons; Cole Gentry
- Home arena: Nutter Center

2024–25 Horizon League men's basketball standings
	Conf.				Overall
Team	W		L	PCT	W		L	PCT
Robert Morris †	15	–	5	.750	26	–	9	.743
Cleveland State	14	–	6	.700	23	–	13	.639
Milwaukee	14	–	6	.700	21	–	11	.656
Youngstown State	13	–	7	.650	21	–	13	.618
Purdue Fort Wayne	12	–	8	.600	19	–	13	.594
Oakland	11	–	9	.550	16	–	18	.471
Northern Kentucky	11	–	9	.550	17	–	16	.515
Wright State	8	–	12	.400	15	–	18	.455
IU Indy	6	–	14	.300	10	–	22	.313
Detroit Mercy	4	–	16	.200	8	–	24	.250
Green Bay	2	–	18	.100	4	–	28	.125
† 2025 Horizon League tournament winner

The 2024–25 Wright State Raiders men's basketball team represented Wright State University in the 2024–25 NCAA Division I men's basketball season. The Raiders, led by first-year head coach Clint Sargent, played their home games at the Nutter Center, located in Fairborn, Ohio but with a Dayton mailing address, as members of the Horizon League.

== Season summary ==
By the end, the Clint Sargent era had gotten off to a terrible start. The beginning had been much more promising with good wins over Miami and Princeton, and close, competitive games with Toledo, Bradley, South Florida and Marshall, all respected teams. Somehow it all fell apart beginning with Youngstown on December 18th. The defensive woes from the previous season had come back again as opponents discovered that they could score at will. An inexplicable collapse against lowly Eastern Michigan came next. The season followed the defense. In short order the Raiders had losses to all six of the competitive teams in the Horizon league (Oakland, YSU, CSU, Robert Morris, Purdue Fort Wayne, and Milwaukee). Notable was that WSU seemed equally uncompetitive in front of large crowds at the friendly Nutter Center as on the road.

Coach Sargent seemed to take each loss as a personal failure, sounding hollowed out inside as he continually struggled to explain how a talented roster seemed to wilt under the lights. The low point of the season came during the late season Wisconsin collapse when they lost to the previously winless Green Bay Phoenix. The tournament would provide no redemption as they quietly exited in the quarterfinals for the third straight year.

There were some reasons to still cheer and be optimistic for the future in Raider land. They were among the top teams in the nation in field goal percentage. Brandon Noel was second in the league in scoring and third in rebounding. Junior Keaton Norris had a bounce-back season and finished 3rd in the Horizon League in assists. Transfers Michael Imariagbe and Jack Doumbia played well. Woods, Callaghan and Carter all continued to develop their games. Freshman Andrea Holden started playing mid-season and showed promise of great things to come. The talent was obvious, but so were the losses.

== Previous season ==
The Raiders finished the 2023–24 season 18–14, 13–7 in Horizon League play to finish tied for third place. As the No. 4 seed in the Horizon League tournament, they lost in the quarterfinals to Northern Kentucky.

Following the season, head coach Scott Nagy left the school to become the head coach at Southern Illinois. On March 29, 2024, the school named assistant coach Clint Sargent the team's new head coach.

== Offseason ==
=== Outgoing transfers ===
A.J. Braun, following a junior season where he led the nation in shooting percentage, left to play at California Baptist. Carson Schwieger transferred to Valparaiso. Kaden Brown transferred to NCAA Division II Grand Valley State.

=== Incoming transfers ===
Guard Jack Doumbia joined the Raiders from Norfolk State. Forward Michael Imariagbe transferred from Houston Christian while forward Ben Southerland transferred from Liberty.

=== Recruits ===
- Andrea Holden out of Hamilton High
- Alex Bruskotter out of Shelby High School chose to follow in his father's footsteps as a Raider athlete.
- Ayden Davis as a two-time all-state award winner and Mr. Basketball Finalist from Onsted High School in Michigan.

== Roster ==
2024–25 Wright State Raiders men's basketball team
Players
Coaches

Pos.	#	Name	Height	Weight	Year	Hometown
G	2	Drey Carter	6 ft 8 in (2.03 m)	210 lb (95 kg)	RS So	Bellefontaine, Ohio
G	3	Alex Huibregtse	6 ft 3 in (1.91 m)	205 lb (93 kg)	RS Sr	Grafton, Wisconsin
G	4	Keaton Norris	6 ft 0 in (1.83 m)	175 lb (79 kg)	RS Jr	Hilliard, Ohio
G	5	Alex Bruskotter (redshirt)	6 ft 8 in (2.03 m)	205 lb (93 kg)	Fr	Shelby, Ohio
G	13	Solomon Callaghan	6 ft 2 in (1.88 m)	195 lb (88 kg)	RS Fr	Wadsworth, Ohio
F	14	Brandon Noel	6 ft 8 in (2.03 m)	240 lb (109 kg)	RS Jr	Lucasville, Ohio
F	15	Braden Grant	6 ft 7 in (2.01 m)	210 lb (95 kg)	RS Jr	Beavercreek, Ohio
F	20	Andrea Holden	6 ft 6 in (1.98 m)	215 lb (98 kg)	Fr	Hamilton, Ohio
G	21	Logan Woods	6 ft 5 in (1.96 m)	185 lb (84 kg)	RS So	Fairfield, Ohio
G	22	Andrew Welage	6 ft 6 in (1.98 m)	205 lb (93 kg)	GS	Greensburg, IN
G	23	Jack Doumbia	6 ft 6 in (1.98 m)	195 lb (88 kg)	Sr	Lanham, MD
F	24	Ben Southerland	6 ft 7 in (2.01 m)	215 lb (98 kg)	RS So	Cincinnati, OH
F	33	Michael Imariagbe	6 ft 7 in (2.01 m)	220 lb (100 kg)	RS Sr	Houston, TX
F/C	51	Ayden Davis (redshirt)	6 ft 10 in (2.08 m)	250 lb (113 kg)	Fr	Onsted, MI

Head coach

- Clint Sargent (South Dakota State)

Assistant coach(es)

- Dan Beré (Indiana)
- Travis Trice (Butler)
- Cole Gentry (Wright State)
- Jaaron Simmons (Michigan)

Legend

- (C) Team captain
- (S) Suspended
- (I) Ineligible
- (W) Walk-on
- Injured
- Current redshirt

Roster
Last update: November 28, 2024

== Schedule and results ==
Date time, TV	Rank^{#}	Opponent^{#}	Result	Record	Site (attendance) city, state
Regular season
November 4, 2024*; 7:00 p.m., ESPNU		at No. 23 Kentucky	L 62–103	0–1	Rupp Arena (19,635); Lexington, KY
November 6, 2024*; 7:00 pm, ESPN+		Ohio Christian	W 89–60	1–1	Nutter Center (2,990); Fairborn, OH
November 9, 2024*; 1:00 pm, ESPN+		at Miami (OH)	W 81–68	2–1	Millett Assembly Hall (2,078); Oxford, Ohio
November 13, 2024*; 7:00 pm, ESPN+		at Toledo	L 77–86	2–2	Savage Arena (4,037); Toledo, OH
November 16, 2024*; 7:00 pm, ESPN+		Central State	W 92–56	3–2	Nutter Center (3,734); Fairborn, OH
November 21, 2024*; 8:00 pm, ESPN+		vs. Princeton; Myrtle Beach Invitational Quarterfinals	W 80–62	4–2	HTC Center (1,367); Conway, SC
November 22, 2024*; 5:00 pm, ESPNU		vs. Bradley; Myrtle Beach Invitational Semifinals	L 74–77	4–3	HTC Center (674); Conway, SC
November 24, 2024*; 1:00 pm, ESPN2		vs. South Florida; Myrtle Beach Invitational 3rd Place Game	L 72–73	4–4	HTC Center (1,265); Conway, SC
November 30, 2024*; 7:00 pm, ESPN+		Air Force; Inaugural Stars, Stripes, and Flight Classic	W 70–57	5–4	Nutter Center (9,672); Fairborn, OH
December 5, 2024; 7:00 pm, ESPN+		at Oakland	L 64–66	5–5 (0–1)	OU Credit Union O'rena; Auburn Hills, MI
December 7, 2024; 1:00 pm, ESPN+		at Detroit Mercy	W 80–72	6–5 (1–1)	Calihan Hall (1,077); Detroit, MI
December 11, 2024*; 7:00 pm, ESPN+		Marshall	W 88–79	7–5	Nutter Center (3,569); Fairborn, OH
December 18, 2024; 7:00 pm, ESPN+		Youngstown State	L 70–80	7–6 (1–2)	Nutter Center (3,932); Fairborn, OH
December 21, 2024*; 2:00 pm		at Eastern Michigan	L 82–86	7–7	George Gervin GameAbove Center (500); Ypsilanti, MI
December 29, 2024; 3:00 pm, ESPN+		at Cleveland State	L 64–78	7–8 (1–3)	Wolstein Center (1,692); Cleveland, OH
January 2, 2025; 7:00 pm, ESPN+		Green Bay	W 74–51	8–8 (2–3)	Nutter Center (3,297); Fairborn, OH
January 9, 2025; 7:00 pm, ESPN+		Oakland	W 66–62	9–8 (3–3)	Nutter Center (3,230); Fairborn, OH
January 12, 2025; 2:00 pm, ESPN+		at Robert Morris	L 72–75	9–9 (3–4)	UPMC Events Center (824); Moon Township, PA
January 15, 2025; 7:00 pm, ESPN+		Purdue Fort Wayne	L 113–120 ^{2OT}	9–10 (3–5)	Nutter Center (3,298); Fairborn, OH
January 18, 2025; 2:00 pm, ESPN+		at Northern Kentucky	W 78–70	10–10 (4–5)	Truist Arena (2,743); Highland Heights, KY
January 22, 2025; 7:00 pm, ESPN+		Milwaukee	L 79–95	10–11 (4–6)	Nutter Center (3,963); Fairborn, OH
January 25, 2025; 1:00 pm, ESPN+		Detroit Mercy	W 67–50	11–11 (5–6)	Nutter Center (5,509); Fairborn, OH
January 30, 2025; 6:30 pm, ESPN+		at Youngstown State	L 86–88	11–12 (5–7)	Beeghly Center (1,570); Youngstown, OH
February 2, 2025; 2:00 pm, ESPN+		Robert Morris	W 66–64	12–12 (6–7)	Nutter Center (3,579); Fairborn, OH
February 5, 2025; 7:00 pm, ESPN+		at Purdue Fort Wayne	L 64–87	12–13 (6–8)	Gates Sports Center (1,437); Fort Wayne, IN
February 8, 2025; 7:00 pm, ESPN+		IU Indy	W 91–73	13–13 (7–8)	Nutter Center (4,640); Fairborn, OH
February 14, 2025; 8:00 pm, ESPN+		at Milwaukee	L 80–88 ^{OT}	13–14 (7–9)	UW–Milwaukee Panther Arena (2,670); Milwaukee, WI
February 16, 2025; 3:00 pm, ESPN+		at Green Bay	L 68–79	13–15 (7–10)	Resch Center (1,708); Ashwaubenon, WI
February 21, 2025; 7:00 pm, ESPN+		Northern Kentucky	L 76–80	13–16 (7–11)	Nutter Center (4,732); Fairborn, OH
February 27, 2025; 9:00 pm, ESPN2		Cleveland State	W 82–76	14–16 (8–11)	Nutter Center (3,587); Fairborn, OH
March 1, 2025; 2:30 pm, ESPN+		at IU Indy	L 84–91	14–17 (8–12)	Corteva Coliseum (1,448); Indianapolis, IN
Horizon League tournament
March 4, 2025; 7:00 pm, ESPN+	(8)	(9) IU Indy; First round	W 98–85	15–17	Nutter Center (2,488); Fairborn, OH
March 6, 2025; 8:00 pm, ESPN+	(8)	at (1) Robert Morris; Quarterfinals	L 62–83	15–18	UPMC Events Center (4,068); Moon Township
*Non-conference game. ^{#}Rankings from AP Poll. (#) Tournament seedings in parentheses. All times are in Eastern.

== Awards and honors ==
Brandon Noel	Second Team All Horizon League
Solomon Callaghan	Horizon League All Freshman Team

== Statistics ==
Number	Name	Games	Average	Points	Assists	Rebounds
14	Brandon Noel	33	19.0	627	57	253
3	Alex Huibregtse	32	13.5	431	100	99
23	Jack Doumbia	33	11.6	383	60	188
4	Keaton Norris	29	7.5	218	126	84
21	Logan Woods	32	6.9	220	57	66
33	Michael Imariagbe	32	6.7	214	27	152
13	Solomon Callaghan	32	6.7	214	40	45
20	Andrea Holden	17	4.1	69	2	60
22	Andrew Welage	31	3.3	103	24	42
2	Drey Carter	24	2.7	64	9	29
51	Ayden Davis	6	1.3	8	0	6
15	Braden Grant	4	0.0	0	0	3
24	Ben Southerland	4	0.0	0	0	1
