= 2024–25 Purdue Fort Wayne Mastodons men's basketball team =

American college basketball season

2024–25 Purdue Fort Wayne Mastodons men's basketball
- Conference: Horizon League
- Record: 19–13 (12–8 Horizon)
- Head coach: Jon Coffman (11th season)
- Assistant coaches: Ryan Sims (15th season); Adam Blaylock (7th season); Mike Wolf (6th season); Pat Lepper (4th season)
- Home arena: Hilliard Gates Sports Center

2024–25 Horizon League men's basketball standings
	Conf.				Overall
Team	W		L	PCT	W		L	PCT
Robert Morris †	15	–	5	.750	26	–	9	.743
Cleveland State	14	–	6	.700	23	–	13	.639
Milwaukee	14	–	6	.700	21	–	11	.656
Youngstown State	13	–	7	.650	21	–	13	.618
Purdue Fort Wayne	12	–	8	.600	19	–	13	.594
Oakland	11	–	9	.550	16	–	18	.471
Northern Kentucky	11	–	9	.550	17	–	16	.515
Wright State	8	–	12	.400	15	–	18	.455
IU Indy	6	–	14	.300	10	–	22	.313
Detroit Mercy	4	–	16	.200	8	–	24	.250
Green Bay	2	–	18	.100	4	–	28	.125
† 2025 Horizon League tournament winner

The 2024–25 Purdue Fort Wayne Mastodons men's basketball team represented Purdue University Fort Wayne in the 2024–25 NCAA Division I men's basketball season. The Mastodons, led by eleventh-year head coach Jon Coffman, played their home games at the Hilliard Gates Sports Center in Fort Wayne, Indiana, as members of the Horizon League.

== Offseason ==
=== Departures ===
Purdue Fort Wayne departures
Name	Number	Pos.	Height	Weight	Year	Hometown	Reason for departure
Destin Whitaker	2	G	6'5"	180	Senior	Romeoville, IL	Transferred to McKendree
Jermaine Coleman	12	F	6'7"	190	Freshman	Indianapolis, IN	Transferred to St. Thomas
Khoi Thurmon	21	G	6'1"	205	Freshman	Chicago, IL	Transferred to Panola College
Anthony Roberts	22	G	6'4"	220	Graduate student	Oak Park, IL	Graduated
Keyon Miller	23	G	6'2"	160	Freshman	Indianapolis, IN	Transferred to Cloud County CC

=== Incoming transfers ===
Purdue Fort Wayne incoming transfers
Name	Number	Pos.	Height	Weight	Year	Hometown	Previous school
Trey Lewis	2	G	6'6"	200	RS Sophomore	Ferndale, MI	Loyola
De'Vion Lavergne	6	G	6'3"	190	Sophomore	Melville, LA	Lee College
Chandler Cuthrell	7	F	6'8"	220	Senior	Baltimore, MD	UTSA

== Roster ==
2023–24 Purdue Fort Wayne Mastodons men's basketball team
Players
Coaches

Pos.	#	Name	Height	Weight	Year	Previous school	Hometown
G	0	Rasheed Bello	6 ft 0 in (1.83 m)	185 lb (84 kg)	Sr	UW–Parkside	Chicago, IL
G	1	Jalen Jackson	6 ft 2 in (1.88 m)	200 lb (91 kg)	Jr	UIC	Fort Wayne, IN
G	2	Trey Lewis	6 ft 6 in (1.98 m)	200 lb (91 kg)	RS So	Loyola	Ferndale, MI
G	3	Quinton Morton-Robertson	5 ft 8 in (1.73 m)	155 lb (70 kg)	GS	Radford	Radford, VA
G	4	Chris Morgan	6 ft 2 in (1.88 m)	190 lb (86 kg)	RS So	Kaukauna	Kaukauna, WI
F	5	Johnathan Dejurnett	6 ft 8 in (2.03 m)	225 lb (102 kg)	GS	Lausanne Collegiate	Memphis, TN
G	6	De'Vion Lavergne	6 ft 3 in (1.91 m)	170 lb (77 kg)	So	Lee College	Melville, LA
F	7	Chandler Cuthrell	6 ft 8 in (2.03 m)	220 lb (100 kg)	Sr	UTSA	Baltimore, MD
G	10	Corey Hadnot II	6 ft 3 in (1.91 m)	175 lb (79 kg)	So	Cypress Creek	Atlanta, GA
F	11	Maximus Nelson	6 ft 8 in (2.03 m)	215 lb (98 kg)	Jr	Valparaiso	Appleton, WI
F	13	Deangelo Elisee	6 ft 9 in (2.06 m)	260 lb (118 kg)	RS Sr	Triton	Nassau, Bahamas
G	22	Mason Shrout	6 ft 5 in (1.96 m)	180 lb (82 kg)	Fr	Preble Shawnee	Camden, OH
G	23	Jordan Lomax	6 ft 3 in (1.91 m)	160 lb (73 kg)	Fr	Brownsburg	Brownsburg, IN
G	24	Keaton Dukes	6 ft 3 in (1.91 m)	170 lb (77 kg)	Jr	Wawasee	Syracuse, IN
G	32	Eric Mulder	6 ft 8 in (2.03 m)	225 lb (102 kg)	Jr	Pella Christian	Oskaloosa, IA

Head coach

- Jon Coffman (Washington and Lee)

Assistant coach(es)

- Ryan Sims (Indianapolis)
- Mike Wolf (William Peace)
- Adam Blaylock (Peru State)
- Pat Lepper (IPFW)

Legend

- (C) Team captain
- (S) Suspended
- (I) Ineligible
- (W) Walk-on
- Injured
- Current redshirt

Roster
Last update: October 18, 2024

== Schedule and results ==
Date time, TV	Rank^{#}	Opponent^{#}	Result	Record	High points	High rebounds	High assists	Site (attendance) city, state
Exhibition
October 30, 2024*; 7:00 p.m., ESPN+		Notre Dame	L 54–91		13 – Jackson	4 – Jackson	3 – Morton-Robertson	Memorial Coliseum (5,905); Fort Wayne, IN
Regular season
November 4, 2024*; 7:00 p.m., ESPN+		Bluffton	W 99–47	1–0	16 – Bello	11 – Mulder	5 – Bello	Hilliard Gates Sports Center (887); Fort Wayne, IN
November 8, 2024*; 7:00 p.m., ESPN+		at UCF	L 68–75	1–1	11 – Tied	7 – Jackson	3 – Jackson	Addition Financial Arena (7,768); Orlando, FL
November 12, 2024*; 7:00 p.m., ESPN+		Bethune–Cookman	W 91–69	2–1	31 – Bello	8 – Mulder	5 – Morton-Robertson	Memorial Coliseum (1,956); Fort Wayne, IN
November 16, 2024*; 7:00 p.m., ESPN+		Southern Indiana	W 93–74	3–1	29 – Jackson	9 – Mulder	4 – Morton-Robertson	Memorial Coliseum (1,161); Fort Wayne, IN
November 20, 2024*; 7:00 p.m., B1G+		at Penn State; Sunshine Slam campus game	L 89–102	3–2	31 – Jackson	11 – Mulder	8 – Morton-Robertson	Bryce Jordan Center (6,547); State College, PA
November 25, 2024*; 12:30 p.m., BallerTV		vs. Drexel; Sunshine Slam Ocean Bracket semifinals	W 87–81	4–2	20 – Bello	9 – Mulder	8 – Bello	Ocean Center; Daytona Beach, FL
November 26, 2024*; 6:30 p.m., BallerTV		vs. Radford; Sunshine Slam Ocean Bracket championships	L 56–69	4–3	23 – Jackson	8 – Mulder	3 – Morton-Robertson	Ocean Center (1,548); Daytona Beach, FL
November 30, 2024*; 2:00 p.m., ESPN+		at East Texas A&M	W 77–57	5–3	16 – Jackson	6 – Tied	6 – Morton-Robertson	The Field House (334); Commerce, TX
December 5, 2024; 1:00 p.m., ESPN+		at Detroit Mercy	L 78–79	5–4 (0–1)	17 – Tied	6 – Elisee	4 – Tied	Calihan Hall (977); Detroit, MI
December 8, 2024; 2:00 p.m., ESPN+		Robert Morris	W 82–77	6–4 (1–1)	23 – Jackson	6 – Tied	5 – Bello	War Memorial Coliseum (1,358); Fort Wayne, IN
December 11, 2024; 7:00 p.m., ESPN+		IU Indy	W 78–76	7–4 (2–1)	18 – Tied	7 – Mulder	7 – Jackson	War Memorial Coliseum (1,407); Fort Wayne, IN
December 15, 2024*; 2:00 p.m., ESPN+		at Eastern Michigan	W 99–76	8–4	19 – Bello	6 – Mulder	8 – Bello	George Gervin GameAbove Center (1,239); Ypsilanti, MI
December 20, 2024*; 7:00 p.m., ESPN+		Defiance	W 103–52	9–4	17 – Hadnot II	9 – Cuthrell	5 – Tied	Hilliard Gates Sports Center (650); Fort Wayne, IN
December 22, 2024*; 1:00 p.m., B1G+		at No. 24 Michigan	L 58–89	9–5	27 – Jackson	3 – Nelson	3 – Morton-Robertson	Crisler Center (12,707); Ann Arbor, MI
December 29, 2024; 2:00 p.m., ESPN+		at Green Bay	W 83–67	10–5 (3–1)	16 – Morton-Robertson	6 – Tied	12 – Bello	Kress Events Center (1,885); Green Bay, WI
January 1, 2025; 12:00 p.m., ESPN+		at Northern Kentucky	L 68–69 ^{OT}	10–6 (3–2)	19 – Morton-Robertson	11 – Cuthrell	4 – Morgan	Truist Arena (1,987); Highland Heights, KY
January 4, 2025; 7:00 p.m., ESPN+		Youngstown State	W 90–81	11–6 (4–2)	25 – Jackson	8 – Cuthrell	7 – Jackson	War Memorial Coliseum (1,375); Fort Wayne, IN
January 8, 2025; 7:00 p.m., ESPN+		Milwaukee	W 78–73	12–6 (5–2)	25 – Jackson	9 – Jackson	3 – Morton-Robertson	War Memorial Coliseum (1,788); Fort Wayne, IN
January 11, 2025; 7:00 p.m., ESPN+		Detroit Mercy	W 90–67	13–6 (6–2)	26 – Bello	10 – Cuthrell	6 – Tied	War Memorial Coliseum (1,582); Fort Wayne, IN
January 15, 2025; 7:00 p.m., ESPN+		at Wright State	W 120–113 ^{2OT}	14–6 (7–2)	30 – Jackson	16 – Cuthrell	8 – Bello	Nutter Center (3,298); Dayton, OH
January 22, 2025; 7:00 p.m., ESPN+		at Oakland	L 72–76	14–7 (7–3)	17 – Jackson	7 – Cuthrell	4 – Bello	Athletics Center O'rena (2,281); Rochester Hills, MI
January 25, 2025; 2:00 p.m., ESPN+		at IU Indy	W 91–80	15–7 (8–3)	38 – Jackson	7 – Tied	6 – Jackson	The Jungle (1,102); Indianapolis, IN
January 30, 2025; 9:00 p.m., ESPNU		Cleveland State	L 58–68	15–8 (8–4)	13 – Tied	8 – Cuthrell	5 – Jackson	War Memorial Coliseum (2,603); Fort Wayne, IN
February 2, 2025; 3:00 p.m., ESPN+		at Milwaukee	W 81–79	16–8 (9–4)	23 – Bello	6 – Bello	6 – Bello	UW–Milwaukee Panther Arena (2,939); Milwaukee, WI
February 5, 2025; 7:00 p.m., ESPN+		Wright State	W 87–64	17–8 (10–4)	22 – Bello	8 – Tied	3 – Bello	War Memorial Coliseum (1,437); Fort Wayne, IN
February 8, 2025; 7:00 p.m., ESPN+		Green Bay	W 89–74	18–8 (11–4)	25 – Bello	11 – Mulder	4 – Jackson	War Memorial Coliseum (2,422); Fort Wayne, IN
February 12, 2025; 6:30 p.m., ESPN+		at Youngstown State	L 71–93	18–9 (11–5)	21 – Bello	8 – Mulder	6 – Bello	Beeghly Center (2,173); Youngstown, OH
February 15, 2025; 2:00 p.m., ESPN+		at Robert Morris	L 69–76	18–10 (11–6)	25 – Bello	6 – Tied	4 – Bello	UPMC Events Center (1,336); Moon Township, PA
February 21, 2025; 7:00 p.m., ESPN+		Oakland	W 80–66	19–10 (12–6)	14 – Jackson	8 – Mulder	8 – Bello	Hilliard Gates Sports Center (1,147); Fort Wayne, IN
February 27, 2025; 7:00 p.m., ESPN+		Northern Kentucky	L 74–79	19–11 (12–7)	20 – Bello	8 – Cuthrell	4 – Jackson	War Memorial Coliseum (1,721); Fort Wayne, IN
March 1, 2025; 4:00 p.m., ESPN2		at Cleveland State	L 57–68	19–12 (12–8)	20 – Bello	7 – Mulder	3 – Tied	Wolstein Center (1,849); Cleveland, OH
Horizon League tournament
March 6, 2025; 7:00 p.m., ESPN+	(5)	at (4) Youngstown State; Quarterfinals	L 67–72	19–13	21 – Morton-Robertson	11 – Jackson	6 – Bello	Beeghly Center (2,605); Youngstown, OH
*Non-conference game. ^{#}Rankings from AP poll. (#) Tournament seedings in parentheses. All times are in Eastern.
