= 2024–25 Milwaukee Panthers men's basketball team =

American college basketball season

2024–25 Milwaukee Panthers men's basketball
- Conference: Horizon League
- Record: 21–11 (14–6 Horizon)
- Head coach: Bart Lundy (3rd season)
- Assistant coaches: Jake Williams; Ben Walker; Jose Winston
- Home arena: UW–Milwaukee Panther Arena

2024–25 Horizon League men's basketball standings
| | Conf. | | | | Overall |
| Team | W | | L | PCT | W | | L | PCT |
|---|---|---|---|---|---|---|---|---|
| Robert Morris † | 15 | – | 5 | .750 | 26 | – | 9 | .743 |
| Cleveland State | 14 | – | 6 | .700 | 23 | – | 13 | .639 |
| Milwaukee | 14 | – | 6 | .700 | 21 | – | 11 | .656 |
| Youngstown State | 13 | – | 7 | .650 | 21 | – | 13 | .618 |
| Purdue Fort Wayne | 12 | – | 8 | .600 | 19 | – | 13 | .594 |
| Oakland | 11 | – | 9 | .550 | 16 | – | 18 | .471 |
| Northern Kentucky | 11 | – | 9 | .550 | 17 | – | 16 | .515 |
| Wright State | 8 | – | 12 | .400 | 15 | – | 18 | .455 |
| IU Indy | 6 | – | 14 | .300 | 10 | – | 22 | .313 |
| Detroit Mercy | 4 | – | 16 | .200 | 8 | – | 24 | .250 |
| Green Bay | 2 | – | 18 | .100 | 4 | – | 28 | .125 |
† 2025 Horizon League tournament winner

The 2024–25 Milwaukee Panthers men's basketball team represented the University of Wisconsin–Milwaukee during the 2024–25 NCAA Division I men's basketball season. The Panthers, led by third-year head coach Bart Lundy, played their home games at the UW–Milwaukee Panther Arena in Milwaukee, Wisconsin, and select games at the on-campus Klotsche Center as members of the Horizon League.

== Previous season ==
The Panthers finished the 2023–24 season in sixth place in the Horizon League with a record of 20–15, including 12–8 in conference play. They defeated eleventh-seeded Detroit Mercy Titans at the Klotsche Center in the first round of the Horizon League tournament, then went on to upset third-seeded Green Bay in the quarterfinals, earning their second-straight trip to the conference semifinals in Indianapolis. The Panthers upset fifth-seeded Northern Kentucky in the semifinals to earn their first championship game appearance since 2017. In the finals, Milwaukee was defeated by top-seed Oakland, 83–76.

== Offseason ==
=== Departures ===
Milwaukee departures
| Name | No. | Pos. | Ht. | Wt. | Year | Hometown | Reason for departure |
|---|---|---|---|---|---|---|---|
| Markeith Browning II | 1 | G | 6'4" | 196 | RS Junior | Ypsilanti, MI | Transferred to Lindenwood |
| B.J. Freeman | 10 | F | 6'6" | 200 | Junior | Selma, NC | Transferred to Arizona State |
| Dominic Ham | 27 | G | 6'5" | 195 | Senior | Atlanta, GA | Graduated |
| Zach Howell | 3 | G | 6'5" | 200 | Sophomore | Springfield, MO | Transferred to Drury |
| Elijah Jamison | 2 | G | 6'3" | 196 | Sophomore | Louisburg, NC | Transferred to UNC Wilmington |
| Makuei Riek | 17 | G | 6'6" | 170 | Freshman | Rochester, MN | Transferred to Fairfield |
| Pierce Spencer | 0 | G | 6'3" | 175 | RS Junior | Porter, TX | Graduated |
| Angelo Stuart | 5 | G | 6'1" | 175 | RS Senior | Queens, NY | Graduated |
| Langston Wilson | 13 | G | 6'9" | 215 | Graduate Student | Upper Darby, PA | Exhausted eligibility |

=== Incoming transfers ===
Milwaukee incoming transfers
| Name | No. | Pos. | Ht. | Wt. | Year | Hometown | Previous school |
|---|---|---|---|---|---|---|---|
| Themus Fulks | 1 | G | 6'1" | 175 | RS Senior | Winston-Salem, NC | Louisiana |
| Danilo Jovanovich | 24 | F | 6'8" | 220 | Junior | Milwaukee, WI | Louisville |
| John Lovelace Jr. | 00 | G | 6'7" | 205 | Junior | Milwaukee, WI | Youngstown State |
| A.J. McKee | 5 | G | 6'2" | 200 | RS Senior | Charlotte, NC | Queens (NC) |
| Jamichael Stillwell | 3 | F | 6'8" | 220 | Junior | Atlanta, GA | Miami Dade College |

=== 2024 recruiting class ===
College recruiting information
| Name | Hometown | School | Height | Weight | Commit date |
|---|---|---|---|---|---|
| TJ Robinson; G | Montclair, NJ | Immaculate Conception (Montclair, NJ) | 6 ft 4 in (1.93 m) | 160 lb (73 kg) | Apr 29, 2024 |
| TJ Robinson; G | Recruit ratings: Rivals: 247Sports: ESPN: (82) | | | | |
Overall recruit ranking:
Note: In many cases, Scout, Rivals, 247Sports, On3, and ESPN may conflict in their listings of height and weight.; In these cases, the average was taken. ESPN grades are on a 100-point scale.; Sources: "2024 Team Ranking". Rivals.

== Preseason ==
The Panthers were picked to finish in first place in the Horizon League preseason coaches poll, tied with Purdue Fort Wayne, receiving a total of 421 points and 15 first-place votes. Guards AJ McKee and Erik Pratt were selected to the Preseason All-League Second-Team.

== Roster ==
2024–25 Milwaukee Panthers men's basketball team
Players
Coaches

| Pos. | # | Name | Height | Weight | Year | Previous school | Hometown |
|---|---|---|---|---|---|---|---|
| G | 00 | John Lovelace Jr. | 6 ft 8 in (2.03 m) | 210 lb (95 kg) | Jr | Youngstown State | Milwaukee, WI |
| G | 1 | Themas Fulks | 6 ft 2 in (1.88 m) | 185 lb (84 kg) | RS Sr | Louisiana | Winston-Salem, NC |
| F | 3 | Jamichael Stillwell | 6 ft 8 in (2.03 m) | 225 lb (102 kg) | Jr | Butler CC | Atlanta, GA |
| F | 4 | Kentrell Pullian | 6 ft 0 in (1.83 m) | 182 lb (83 kg) | Sr | Eastern New Mexico | Benton Harbor, MI |
| G | 5 | AJ McKee | 6 ft 2 in (1.88 m) | 205 lb (93 kg) | RS Sr | Queens (NC) | Charlotte, NC |
| G | 6 | Esyah Pippa-White | 6 ft 2 in (1.88 m) | 180 lb (82 kg) | So | Odessa | Portland, OR |
| F | 7 | Vinko Polovic (W) | 6 ft 7 in (2.01 m) | 205 lb (93 kg) | RS So | Bosco Institute | Milwaukee, WI |
| G | 8 | Erik Pratt | 6 ft 5 in (1.96 m) | 185 lb (84 kg) | RS Sr | Texas A&M | Lake Worth, FL |
| G | 11 | Learic Davis | 6 ft 7 in (2.01 m) | 190 lb (86 kg) | RS So | Tennessee State | Milwaukee, WI |
| G | 13 | TJ Cusciotta (W) | 6 ft 4 in (1.93 m) | 198 lb (90 kg) | Fr | White Bear Lake HS | White Bear Lake, MN |
| F | 15 | Simeon Murchison (W) | 6 ft 9 in (2.06 m) | 221 lb (100 kg) | So | Milwaukee Hamilton HS | Milwaukee, WI |
| G | 20 | Maurice Thomas (W) | 6 ft 0 in (1.83 m) | 175 lb (79 kg) | RS Fr | DePaul College Prep | Chicago, IL |
| F | 22 | Faizon Fields | 6 ft 10 in (2.08 m) | 220 lb (100 kg) | Sr | Old Dominion | Memphis, TN |
| G | 23 | Austin Villareal (W) | 6 ft 1 in (1.85 m) | 175 lb (79 kg) | Fr | Arrowhead HS | Pewaukee, WI |
| F | 24 | Danilo Jovanovich | 6 ft 8 in (2.03 m) | 216 lb (98 kg) | Jr | Louisville | Milwaukee, WI |
| G | 25 | Aaron Franklin | 6 ft 5 in (1.96 m) | 210 lb (95 kg) | RS Jr | Hutchinson CC | Kansas City, MO |
| F | 34 | Darius Duffy | 6 ft 8 in (2.03 m) | 225 lb (102 kg) | Sr | Ranger | Murray, KY |

Head coach

- Bart Lundy (Lenoir–Rhyne)

Assistant coach(es)

- Jake Williams (Middle Tennessee)
- Ben Walker (Creighton)
- Jose Winston (Milwaukee)

Legend

- (C) Team captain
- (S) Suspended
- (I) Ineligible
- (W) Walk-on
- Injured
- Current redshirt

Roster
Last update: November 14, 2024

== Schedule and results ==
| Date time, TV | Rank^{#} | Opponent^{#} | Result | Record | High points | High rebounds | High assists | Site (attendance) city, state |
Regular season
| November 4, 2024*; 6:00 p.m., ESPN+ | | Lakeland | W 118–62 | 1–0 | 18 – Stillwell | 14 – Stillwell | 8 – McKee | Klotsche Center (1,448); Milwaukee, WI |
| November 7, 2024*; 7:00 p.m., ESPN+ | | at Northern Iowa | L 68–87 | 1–1 | 18 – Fulks | 9 – Stillwell | 2 – Tied | McLeod Center (3,247); Cedar Falls, IA |
| November 13, 2024*; 6:00 p.m., ESPN+ | | at Longwood | L 62–76 | 1–2 | 19 – Pullian | 9 – Stillwell | 5 – Fulks | Joan Perry Brock Center (1,326); Farmville, VA |
| November 19, 2024*; 6:00 p.m., ESPN+ | | at Duquesne | W 80–74 | 2–2 | 22 – Pullian | 10 – Stillwell | 4 – Fulks | UPMC Cooper Fieldhouse (2,046); Pittsburgh, PA |
| November 22, 2024*; 7:00 p.m., ESPN+ | | Portland State; Cream City Challenge | W 91–74 | 3–2 | 21 – McKee | 11 – Stillwell | 6 – Fulks | UW–Milwaukee Panther Arena (1,638); Milwaukee, WI |
| November 23, 2024*; 3:00 p.m., ESPN+ | | Wofford; Cream City Challenge | W 76–74 | 4–2 | 24 – Fulks | 12 – Stillwell | 4 – Fulks | UW–Milwaukee Panther Arena (1,756); Milwaukee, WI |
| November 24, 2024*; 1:30 p.m., ESPN+ | | St. Thomas; Cream City Challenge | W 69–65 | 5–2 | 22 – Stillwell | 8 – Tied | 8 – Fulks | UW–Milwaukee Panther Arena (1,669); Milwaukee, WI |
| November 27, 2024*; 6:00 p.m., ESPN+ | | at UCF | L 76–84 | 5–3 | 15 – Pullian | 12 – Stillwell | 6 – Fulks | Addition Financial Arena (6,027); Orlando, FL |
| November 30, 2024*; 1:00 p.m., ESPN+ | | at Southern Miss | L 65–66 | 5–4 | 17 – Fulks | 8 – Tied | 3 – Fulks | Reed Green Coliseum (2,867); Hattiesburg, MS |
| December 5, 2024; 7:00 p.m., ESPN+ | | Cleveland State | W 79–67 | 6–4 (1–0) | 24 – Pullian | 15 – Stillwell | 5 – Fulks | UW–Milwaukee Panther Arena (1,828); Milwaukee, WI |
| December 11, 2024; 6:00 p.m., ESPN+ | | at Green Bay | W 88–67 | 7–4 (2–0) | 24 – Stillwell | 19 – Stillwell | 8 – Fulks | Resch Center (2,135); Ashwaubenon, WI |
| December 15, 2024*; 12:30 p.m., ESPN+ | | vs. Akron; MKE Tip-Off | W 100–81 | 8–4 | 23 – Fulks | 18 – Stillwell | 7 – Fulks | Fiserv Forum (3,278); Milwaukee, WI |
| December 22, 2024*; 2:00 p.m., ESPN+ | | North Central (IL) | W 92–57 | 9–4 | 20 – Pratt | 10 – Stillwell | 9 – Fulks | Klotsche Center (1,534); Milwaukee, WI |
| December 29, 2024; 1:00 p.m., ESPN+ | | IU Indy | W 88–81 | 10–4 (3–0) | 26 – Fulks | 13 – Stillwell | 5 – Fulks | Klotsche Center (1,335); Milwaukee, WI |
| January 2, 2025; 6:00 p.m., ESPN+ | | at Oakland | L 49–65 | 10–5 (3–1) | 14 – Tied | 9 – Stillwell | 2 – Tied | OU Credit Union O'rena (1,860); Auburn Hills, MI |
| January 4, 2025; 12:00 p.m., ESPN+ | | at Detroit Mercy | W 64–56 | 11–5 (4–1) | 14 – Tied | 13 – Stillwell | 3 – Pratt | Calihan Hall (1,103); Detroit, MI |
| January 8, 2025; 6:00 p.m., ESPN+ | | at Purdue Fort Wayne | L 73–78 | 11–6 (4–2) | 18 – Fulks | 12 – Pullian | 4 – McKee | Allen County War Memorial Coliseum (1,788); Fort Wayne, IN |
| January 11, 2025; 3:00 p.m., ESPN+ | | Green Bay | W 70–59 | 12–6 (5–2) | 14 – Fulks | 10 – Pullian | 5 – Fulks | UW–Milwaukee Panther Arena (3,507); Milwaukee, WI |
| January 17, 2025; 7:00 p.m., ESPN+ | | Youngstown State | W 79–64 | 13–6 (6–2) | 21 – Fields | 10 – Stillwell | 4 – Tied | UW–Milwaukee Panther Arena (1,957); Milwaukee, WI |
| January 19, 2025; 2:00 p.m., ESPN+ | | Robert Morris | L 79–81 | 13–7 (6–3) | 26 – Stillwell | 7 – Stillwell | 5 – Fulks | UW–Milwaukee Panther Arena (1,893); Milwaukee, WI |
| January 22, 2025; 6:00 p.m., ESPN+ | | at Wright State | W 95–79 | 14–7 (7–3) | 18 – Tied | 7 – Jovanowich | 9 – Fulks | Nutter Center (3,963); Fairborn, OH |
| January 24, 2025; 6:00 p.m., ESPN+ | | at Northern Kentucky | W 79–59 | 15–7 (8–3) | 20 – Pratt | 9 – Stillwell | 7 – Fulks | Truist Arena (2,712); Highland Heights, KY |
| February 2, 2025; 2:00 p.m., ESPN+ | | Purdue Fort Wayne | L 79–81 | 15–8 (8–4) | 15 – Fulks | 9 – Fields | 8 – Fulks | UW–Milwaukee Panther Arena (2,939); Milwaukee, WI |
| February 5, 2025; 5:30 p.m., ESPN+ | | at IU Indy | W 84–80 ^{OT} | 16–8 (9–4) | 17 – Tied | 14 – Stillwell | 11 – Fulks | IUPUI Gymnasium (657); Indianapolis, IN |
| February 8, 2025; 2:00 p.m., ESPN+ | | at Cleveland State | L 60–77 | 16–9 (9–5) | 17 – McKee | 6 – Tied | 3 – Fulks | Wolstein Center (2,269); Cleveland, OH |
| February 14, 2025; 7:00 p.m., ESPN+ | | Wright State | W 88–80 ^{OT} | 17–9 (10–5) | 21 – Fulks | 8 – Stillwell | 12 – Fulks | UW–Milwaukee Panther Arena (2,670); Milwaukee, WI |
| February 16, 2025; 2:00 p.m., ESPN+ | | Northern Kentucky | W 92–70 | 18–9 (11–5) | 18 – Stillwell | 13 – Stillwell | 7 – Fulks | UW–Milwaukee Panther Arena (2,883); Milwaukee, WI |
| February 21, 2025; 8:00 p.m., ESPNU | | at Youngstown State | W 84–74 | 19–9 (12–5) | 21 – Fulks | 11 – Stillwell | 10 – Fulks | Beeghly Center (2,609); Youngstown, OH |
| February 23, 2025; 1:00 p.m., ESPN+ | | at Robert Morris | L 59–72 | 19–10 (12–6) | 13 – Pratt | 10 – Stillwell | 5 – Fulks | UPMC Events Center (1,611); Moon Township, PA |
| February 27, 2025; 7:00 p.m., ESPN+ | | Oakland | W 71–66 | 20–10 (13–6) | 15 – McKee | 13 – Stillwell | 5 – Fulks | UW–Milwaukee Panther Arena (2,126); Milwaukee, WI |
| March 1, 2025; 3:00 p.m., ESPN+ | | Detroit Mercy | W 89–67 | 21–10 (14–6) | 18 – Pullian | 10 – Stillwell | 9 – Fulks | UW–Milwaukee Panther Arena (3,013); Milwaukee, WI |
Horizon League tournament
| March 6, 2025; 7:00 p.m., ESPN+ | (3) | (6) Oakland; Quarterfinals | L 64–72 | 21–11 | 20 – Fulks | 8 – Stillwell | 6 – Tied | Klotsche Center (2,151); Milwaukee, WI |
*Non-conference game. ^{#}Rankings from AP Poll. (#) Tournament seedings in parentheses. All times are in Central.
