= 2024–25 Detroit Mercy Titans men's basketball team =

American college basketball season

2024–25 Detroit Mercy Titans men's basketball
- Conference: Horizon League
- Record: 8–24 (4–16 Horizon)
- Head coach: Mark Montgomery (1st season)
- Assistant coaches: Lamar Chapman; Mike Peck; LaMonta Stone; Chris MacMartin; Ian Jones Collyn Richardson
- Home arena: Calihan Hall

2024–25 Horizon League men's basketball standings
	Conf.				Overall
Team	W		L	PCT	W		L	PCT
Robert Morris †	15	–	5	.750	26	–	9	.743
Cleveland State	14	–	6	.700	23	–	13	.639
Milwaukee	14	–	6	.700	21	–	11	.656
Youngstown State	13	–	7	.650	21	–	13	.618
Purdue Fort Wayne	12	–	8	.600	19	–	13	.594
Oakland	11	–	9	.550	16	–	18	.471
Northern Kentucky	11	–	9	.550	17	–	16	.515
Wright State	8	–	12	.400	15	–	18	.455
IU Indy	6	–	14	.300	10	–	22	.313
Detroit Mercy	4	–	16	.200	8	–	24	.250
Green Bay	2	–	18	.100	4	–	28	.125
† 2025 Horizon League tournament winner

The 2024–25 Detroit Mercy Titans men's basketball team represented the University of Detroit Mercy during the 2024–25 NCAA Division I men's basketball season. The Titans, led by first-year head coach Mark Montgomery, played their home games at Calihan Hall in Detroit, Michigan as members of the Horizon League. They finished the season 8–24, 4–16 in Horizon League play to finish in 10th place. They lost to Northern Kentucky in the first round of the Horizon League tournament.

== Previous season ==
The Titans finished the 2023–24 season 1–31, 1–19 in Horizon League play to finish in last place. They lost to Milwaukee in the first round of the Horizon League tournament.

On March 7, 2024, the school fired head coach Mike Davis, ending his six-year tenure with the team. On April 3, Michigan State assistant coach Mark Montgomery was named the team's new coach.

== Roster ==
2024–25 Detroit Mercy Titans men's basketball team
Players
Coaches

Pos.	#	Name	Height	Weight	Year	Previous school	Hometown
G	1	Mak Manciel	6 ft 4 in (1.93 m)	200 lb (91 kg)	Sr	Arkansas State	Detroit, Michigan
F	2	Miles Mitchell	6 ft 10 in (2.08 m)	210 lb (95 kg)	Fr	Warren Lincoln HS	Detroit, Michigan
F	4	Legend Geeter	6 ft 8 in (2.03 m)	230 lb (104 kg)	Jr	Eastern Michigan	River Rouge, Michigan
G	5	Orlando Lovejoy	6 ft 3 in (1.91 m)	190 lb (86 kg)	Jr	Eastern Michigan	Detroit, Michigan
G/F	6	Emmanuel Kuac	6 ft 7 in (2.01 m)	210 lb (95 kg)	GS	New Mexico	Calgary, Alberta
G/F	7	Chase Kuiper	6 ft 6 in (1.98 m)	190 lb (86 kg)	Fr	Troy HS	Troy, Michigan
G	8	Grant Gondrezick II	6 ft 0 in (1.83 m)	180 lb (82 kg)	RS Fr	Elon	Benton Harbor, Michigan
G	10	Nate Johnson	6 ft 5 in (1.96 m)	190 lb (86 kg)	Fr	Grand Rapids Christian HS	Grand Rapids, Michigan
G	11	Ryan Hurst	6 ft 3 in (1.91 m)	230 lb (104 kg)	RS Fr	North Farmington HS	Farmington, Michigan
G	13	Jared Lary	6 ft 6 in (1.98 m)	190 lb (86 kg)	Jr	Aquinas	Grand Rapids, Michigan
G	14	Peter Fuchs Jr.	6 ft 3 in (1.91 m)	190 lb (86 kg)	Jr	Minnesota Crookston	Wausau, Wisconsin
F	15	Alex Tchikou	6 ft 11 in (2.11 m)	230 lb (104 kg)	RS Sr	Rhode Island	Paris, France
F	23	Stephen Okoro	6 ft 9 in (2.06 m)	230 lb (104 kg)	Fr	Combine Academy	Imo State, Nigeria
F	30	Ryan Kalambay	6 ft 9 in (2.06 m)	240 lb (109 kg)	Fr	Fort Erie Academy	Brampton, Ontario
G	33	TJ Nadeau	6 ft 5 in (1.96 m)	195 lb (88 kg)	Fr	Detroit Catholic Central HS	South Lyon, Michigan

Head coach

- Mark Montgomery (Michigan State)

Assistant coach(es)

- Lamar Chapman (Lane College)
- Mike Peck (Northwood)
- LaMonta Stone (UM–Dearborn)
- Chris MacMartin (Northern Illinois)
- Ian Jones (East Carolina)
- Collyn Richardson (Toledo)

Legend

- (C) Team captain
- (S) Suspended
- (I) Ineligible
- (W) Walk-on
- Injured
- Current redshirt

Roster
Last update: November 5, 2024

== Schedule and results ==
Date time, TV	Rank^{#}	Opponent^{#}	Result	Record	High points	High rebounds	High assists	Site (attendance) city, state
Exhibition
October 28, 2024*; 4:00 pm		Wayne State	L 54–56	–	13 – Manciel	10 – Kuac	5 – Johnson	Calihan Hall (1,203); Detroit, MI
Regular season
November 4, 2024*; 7:00 pm, ESPN+		Cleary	W 91–52	1–0	13 – Tied	10 – Okoro	5 – Gondrezick II	Calihan Hall (977); Detroit, MI
November 7, 2024*; 8:00 pm, ESPN+		at Loyola Chicago	L 65–87	1–1	16 – Manciel	6 – Okoro	3 – Lovejoy	Joseph J. Gentile Arena (2,240); Chicago, IL
November 10, 2024*; 1:00 pm, ESPN+		Niagara	W 84–78 ^{OT}	2–1	30 – Manciel	8 – Manciel	5 – Lovejoy	Calihan Hall (807); Detroit, MI
November 16, 2024*; 4:00 pm, ESPN+		Toledo	L 67–82	2–2	18 – Kuac	5 – Okoro	2 – Tied	Calihan Hall (1,098); Detroit, MI
November 20, 2024*; 7:00 pm, ESPN+		at Ball State	W 70–59	3–2	19 – Lovejoy	7 – Lovejoy	5 – Lovejoy	Worthen Arena (2,784); Muncie, IN
November 23, 2024*; 4:00 pm, ACCNX/ESPN+		at Wake Forest	L 57–67	3–3	15 – Lovejoy	9 – Nadeau	6 – Lovejoy	LJVM Coliseum (8,705); Winston-Salem, NC
November 26, 2024*; 12:00 pm		vs. Tulsa; Jacksonville Classic	L 44–63	3–4	12 – Lary	9 – Okoro	1 – Tied	FSCJ South Gym (123); Jacksonville, FL
November 27, 2024*; 12:00 pm		vs. Rhode Island; Jacksonville Classic	L 75–81	3–5	28 – Lovejoy	6 – Tied	7 – Lovejoy	FSCJ South Gym (161); Jacksonville, FL
November 30, 2024*; 7:00 pm, ESPN+		at Eastern Michigan	W 98–89 ^{OT}	4–5	22 – Gondrezick II	7 – Gondrezick II	7 – Lovejoy	George Gervin GameAbove Center (1,509); Ypsilanti, MI
December 5, 2024; 1:00 pm, ESPN+		Purdue Fort Wayne	W 79–78	5–5 (1–0)	22 – Geeter	9 – Geeter	9 – Lovejoy	Calihan Hall (977); Detroit, MI
December 7, 2024; 1:00 pm, ESPN+		Wright State	L 72–80	5–6 (1–1)	14 – Lovejoy	8 – Geeter	4 – Lovejoy	Calihan Hall (1,077); Detroit, MI
December 14, 2024*; 7:00 pm, ESPN+		at Davidson	L 51–86	5–7	17 – Geeter	6 – Tied	4 – Lovejoy	John M. Belk Arena (2,203); Davidson, NC
December 18, 2024; 7:00 pm, ESPN+		at Northern Kentucky	L 60–73	5–8 (1–2)	16 – Lovejoy	8 – Mitchell	4 – Tied	Truist Arena (1,936); Highland Heights, KY
December 22, 2024*; 2:00 pm, BTN		at Wisconsin	L 53–76	5–9	20 – Tied	7 – Mitchell	3 – Lovejoy	Kohl Center (14,098); Madison, WI
December 29, 2024; 2:00 pm, ESPN+		at Youngstown State	L 64–73	5–10 (1–3)	23 – Lovejoy	10 – Johnson	3 – Johnson	Beeghly Center (1,857); Youngstown, OH
January 2, 2025; 7:00 pm, ESPN+		Robert Morris	W 78–76 ^{OT}	6–10 (2–3)	32 – Lovejoy	9 – Lovejoy	4 – Lovejoy	Calihan Hall (1,024); Detroit, MI
January 4, 2025; 1:00 pm, ESPN+		Milwaukee	L 56–64	6–11 (2–4)	20 – Lovejoy	10 – Lovejoy	5 – Lovejoy	Calihan Hall (1,103); Detroit, MI
January 9, 2025; 6:30 pm, ESPN+		at IU Indy	L 61–95	6–12 (2–5)	21 – Gondrezick II	9 – Mitchell	5 – Gondrezick II	The Jungle (667); Indianapolis, IN
January 11, 2025; 7:00 pm, ESPN+		at Purdue Fort Wayne	L 67–90	6–13 (2–6)	20 – Nadeau	8 – Nadeau	5 – Gondrezick II	Memorial Coliseum (1,582); Fort Wayne, IN
January 18, 2025; 1:00 pm, ESPN+		Oakland; Metro Series	L 59–65	6–14 (2–7)	16 – Johnson	11 – Kalambay	5 – Lovejoy	Calihan Hall (2,047); Detroit, MI
January 22, 2025; 7:00 pm, ESPN+		at Cleveland State	L 50–65	6–15 (2–8)	14 – Lovejoy	9 – Kalambay	3 – Lovejoy	Wolstein Center (1,623); Cleveland, OH
January 25, 2025; 1:00 pm, ESPN+		at Wright State	L 50–67	6–16 (2–9)	15 – Lovejoy	7 – Mitchell	2 – Nadeau	Nutter Center (5,509); Fairborn, OH
January 30, 2025; 7:00 pm, ESPN+		Northern Kentucky	W 68–57	7–16 (3–9)	19 – Lovejoy	8 – Geeter	3 – Kalambay	Calihan Hall (931); Detroit, MI
February 1, 2025; 1:00 pm, ESPN+		Green Bay	W 67–57	8–16 (4–9)	19 – Lovejoy	7 – Tied	4 – Lovejoy	Calihan Hall (1,501); Detroit, MI
February 5, 2025; 7:00 pm, ESPN+		at Robert Morris	L 56–71	8–17 (4–10)	17 – Lovejoy	7 – Nadeau	6 – Lovejoy	UPMC Events Center (1,576); Moon Township, PA
February 8, 2025; 1:00 pm, ESPN+		Youngstown State	L 72–87	8–18 (4–11)	24 – Lovejoy	7 – Tied	6 – Geeter	Calihan Hall (1,071); Detroit, MI
February 16, 2025; 3:00 pm, ESPN+		at Oakland; Metro Series	L 83–93 ^{OT}	8–19 (4–12)	20 – Lovejoy	7 – Geeter	5 – Geeter	OU Credit Union O'rena (2,581); Auburn Hills, MI
February 19, 2025; 7:00 pm, ESPN+		IU Indy	L 71–80	8–20 (4–13)	22 – Lovejoy	9 – Lovejoy	4 – Lovejoy	Calihan Hall (1,113); Detroit, MI
February 21, 2025; 7:00 pm, ESPN+		Cleveland State	L 65–73	8–21 (4–14)	17 – Lovejoy	6 – Tied	3 – Lovejoy	Calihan Hall (1,001); Detroit, MI
February 27, 2025; 7:00 pm, ESPN+		at Green Bay	L 71–76	8–22 (4–15)	15 – Nadeau	8 – Tied	4 – Johnson	Resch Center (1,754); Ashwaubenon, WI
March 1, 2025; 4:00 pm, ESPN+		at Milwaukee	L 67–89	8–23 (4–16)	15 – Nadeau	10 – Kuac	4 – Lovejoy	UWM Panther Arena (3,013); Milwaukee, WI
Horizon League tournament
March 4, 2025; 7:00 pm, ESPN+	(10)	at (7) Northern Kentucky; First round	L 75–99	8–24	21 – Lovejoy	6 – Kalambay	4 – Lovejoy	Truist Arena (1,879); Highland Heights, KY
*Non-conference game. ^{#}Rankings from AP Poll. (#) Tournament seedings in parentheses. All times are in Eastern.
