= Andrew Toole =

American basketball head coach

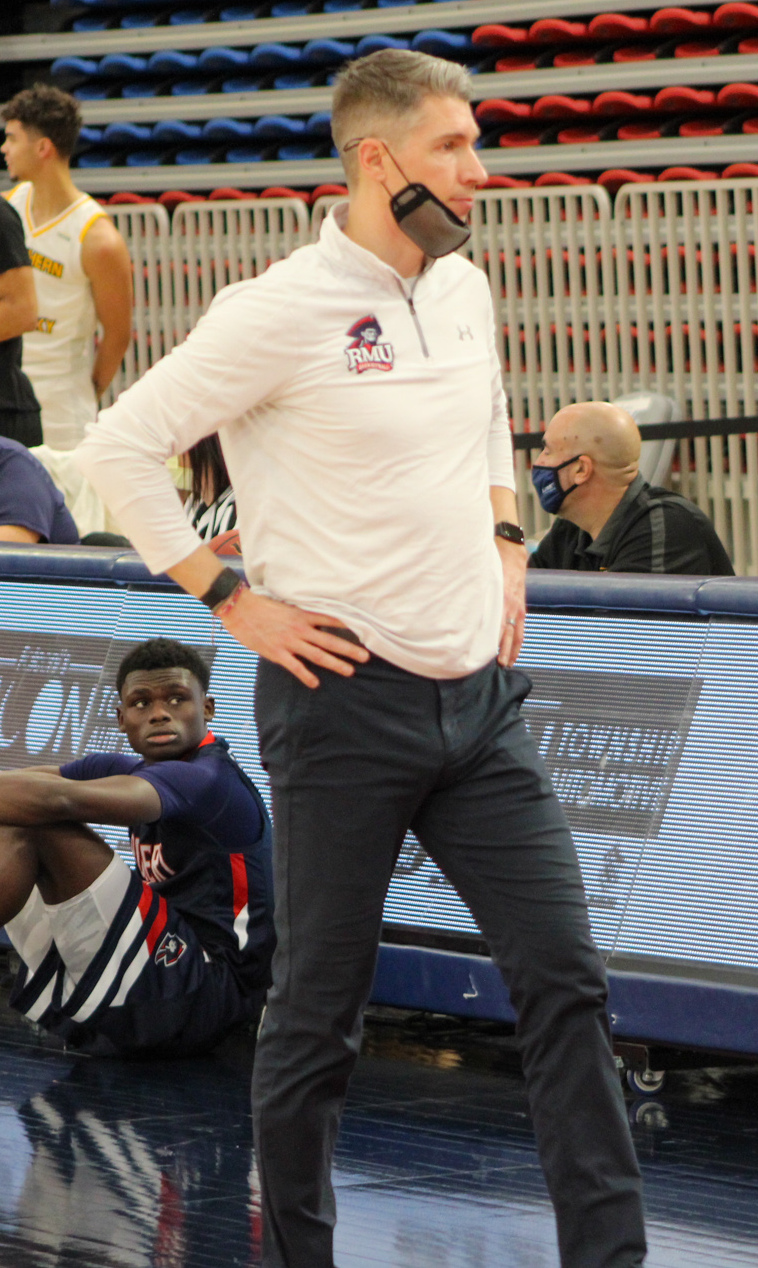
- Toole in 2021

Current position
- Title: Head coach
- Team: Robert Morris
- Conference: Horizon League
- Record: 274–252 (.521)

Biographical details
- Born: September 11, 1980 (age 46); Staten Island, New York, U.S.

Playing career
- 1998–2000: Elon
- 2001–2003: Penn
- Position: Guard

Coaching career (HC unless noted)
- 2006–2007: Lafayette (assistant)
- 2007–2010: Robert Morris (assistant)
- 2010–present: Robert Morris

Head coaching record
- Overall: 274–252 (.521)
- Tournaments: 1–2 (NCAA Division I); 2–2 (NIT); 3–2 (CIT); 16–8 (NEC); 5–4 (Horizon)

Accomplishments and honors

Championships
- 2 NEC tournament (2015, 2020); 2 NEC regular season (2013, 2014); Horizon tournament (2025); Horizon regular season (2025)

Awards
- NEC Coach of the Year (2014); Horizon League Coach of the Year (2025)

Andrew Toole (born September 11, 1980) is an American college basketball head coach for Robert Morris University. He has held that position since 2010 and is currently the 6th youngest head coach in Division I basketball. Toole had served as an assistant coach at Lafayette College and Robert Morris prior to accepting his first head coaching position. As a player, Toole played at Elon University before transferring to the University of Pennsylvania.

== Playing career ==
Raised in Red Bank, New Jersey, Toole played high school basketball at Christian Brothers Academy, graduating in 1998.

While at Penn, Toole helped guide the Quakers to consecutive NCAA tournament appearances in 2002 and 2003. He served as co-captain for the 2002-03 Quaker team that finished the regular season 22–6. Over his four-year career at Elon and Penn, he averaged 12.3 points per game, while also contributing 3.0 assists and rebounds per game.

== Coaching career ==
Following his graduation from the University of Pennsylvania, Toole spent two years with the Hoop Group, a major AAU high school exposure camp, in Neptune City, New Jersey. Then he took up his first assistant coaching job at Lafayette College in 2006.

=== Robert Morris ===
After only one season at Lafayette, Toole moved west and accepted an assistant coaching job with Robert Morris University under former Rutgers University head coach Mike Rice Jr. Toole helped guide the Colonials to two straight NCAA Tournament berths in 2009 and 2010, where they were the 15th seed each time. When Rice left for Rutgers following the 2009–10 season, Robert Morris Director of Athletics Craig Coleman named Toole the 8th head coach in the basketball program's 34 years of existence on May 11, 2010.

"I'm unbelievably excited to be the head coach at Robert Morris University," Toole said during his press conference at the Charles L. Sewall Center. "I take that honor very seriously, and I'm going to work incredibly hard and tirelessly to prove those people right while continuing to build on the success that we've had over the last three years." With his appointment, Toole became the youngest head coach in men's Division I basketball, and the fifth head coach with ties to the Hoop Group, following Rice (Rutgers), Greg Vetrone (Fairleigh Dickinson), Chuck Martin (Marist), and Jesse Agel (Brown).

Toole earned his first head coaching victory on November 13, 2010 against St. Peter's College, a 55–30 triumph at the Sewall Center. The win also set a new school record for points allowed in a game, besting the previous mark of 34 points allowed.

== Head coaching record ==
Record table
Season	Team	Overall	Conference	Standing	Postseason
Robert Morris Colonials (Northeast Conference) (2010–2020)
2010–11	Robert Morris	18–14	12–6	3rd	
2011–12	Robert Morris	26–11	13–5	3rd	CIT Quarterfinals
2012–13	Robert Morris	24–11	14–4	1st	NIT Second Round
2013–14	Robert Morris	22–14	14–2	1st	NIT Second Round
2014–15	Robert Morris	20–15	12–6	T–2nd	NCAA Division I Round of 64
2015–16	Robert Morris	10–22	8–10	8th	
2016–17	Robert Morris	14–19	9–9	T–5th	
2017–18	Robert Morris	16–17	9–9	T–6th	
2018–19	Robert Morris	18–17	11–7	T–3rd	CIT Second Round
2019–20	Robert Morris	20–14	13–5	T–2nd	NCAA Canceled
Robert Morris Colonials (Horizon League) (2020–present)
2020–21	Robert Morris	4–15	3–12	12th	
2021–22	Robert Morris	8–24	5–16	10th	
2022–23	Robert Morris	16–17	10–10	T–6th	
2023–24	Robert Morris	10–22	6–14	9th	
2024–25	Robert Morris	26–9	15–5	1st	NCAA Division I Round of 64
2025–26	Robert Morris	22–11	13–7	2nd	
2026–27	Robert Morris	0–0	0–0		
Robert Morris:		274–252 (.521)	167–127 (.568)		
Total:		274–252 (.521)			
National champion Postseason invitational champion Conference regular season champion Conference regular season and conference tournament champion Division regular season champion Division regular season and conference tournament champion Conference tournament champion

== Personal ==
Toole is a member of the Friars Senior Society at the University of Pennsylvania and earned his B.A. in Political Science in 2003. He currently resides in Mt. Lebanon, Pennsylvania with his wife and two sons.
