= 2023–24 Horizon League men's basketball season =

- League: NCAA Division I
- Sport: Men's basketball
- Number of teams: 11
- TV partner(s): ESPN+ ESPN2; ESPNU; ESPN

Regular season
- Season champions: Oakland
- Season MVP: Trey Townsend, Oakland
- Top scorer: BJ Freeman, Milwaukee

Tournament
- Champions: Oakland
- Runners-up: Milwaukee
- Finals MVP: Trey Townsend, Oakland

Basketball seasons
- ← 2022–23 2024–25 →

2023–24 Horizon League men's basketball standings
	Conf.				Overall
Team	W		L	PCT	W		L	PCT
Oakland †	15	–	5	.750	24	–	12	.667
Youngstown State	14	–	6	.700	22	–	10	.688
Green Bay	13	–	7	.650	18	–	14	.563
Wright State	13	–	7	.650	18	–	14	.563
Northern Kentucky	12	–	8	.600	18	–	15	.545
Milwaukee	12	–	8	.600	20	–	15	.571
Cleveland State	11	–	9	.550	21	–	15	.583
Purdue Fort Wayne	11	–	9	.550	23	–	13	.639
Robert Morris	6	–	14	.300	10	–	22	.313
IUPUI	2	–	18	.100	6	–	26	.188
Detroit Mercy	1	–	19	.050	1	–	31	.031
† 2024 Horizon League tournament winner

The 2023–24 Horizon League men's basketball season began with practices in September 2023 and ended with the 2024 Horizon League men's basketball tournament in March 2024. This was the 44th season for Horizon League men's basketball.

This was the final season for Horizon League member IUPUI as an institution. The Indiana University and Purdue University systems dissolved IUPUI at the end of the 2023–24 school year, replacing it with separate IU- and Purdue-affiliated institutions. The IUPUI athletic program transferred to the new IU Indianapolis (branded athletically as IU Indy), maintaining its NCAA Division I and Horizon League memberships.

== Head coaches ==
=== Coaching changes ===
- On January 31, 2023, Green Bay fired head coach Will Ryan after three seasons and a 2–19 start. Assistant coach Freddie Owens was named interim head coach. On March 14, the Phoenix hired Wyoming assistant coach Sundance Wicks as their new head coach.

=== Coaches ===
Team	Head coach	Previous job	Season	Overall record	Horizon record	NCAA Tournaments
Cleveland State	Daniyal Robinson	Iowa State (asst.)	2nd	21–14 (.600)	14–6 (.700)	0
Detroit Mercy	Mike Davis	Texas Southern	6th	59–88 (.401)	43–46 (.483)	0
Green Bay	Sundance Wicks	Wyoming (asst.)	1st	0–0 (–)	0–0 (–)	0
IUPUI	Matt Crenshaw	Ball State (asst.)	3rd	8–53 (.131)	3–34 (.081)	0
Milwaukee	Bart Lundy	Queens	2nd	22–12 (.647)	14–6 (.700)	0
Northern Kentucky	Darrin Horn	Texas (asst.)	5th	79–45 (.637)	52–24 (.684)	2
Oakland	Greg Kampe	Toledo (asst.)	40th	670–514 (.566)	102–67 (.604)	0
Purdue Fort Wayne	Jon Coffman	IPFW (asst.)	10th	155–128 (.548)	81–75 (.519)	0
Robert Morris	Andrew Toole	Robert Morris (asst.)	14th	216–210 (.507)	133–101 (.568)	2
Wright State	Scott Nagy	South Dakota State	8th	149–78 (.656)	94–40 (.701)	2
Youngstown State	Jerrod Calhoun	Fairmont State	7th	95–95 (.500)	60–55 (.522)	0

Notes:

- Season number includes 2023–24 season.
- Records are prior to 2023–24 season.

== Preseason ==
=== Preseason coaches poll ===
2023-24 Horizon League Preseason Coaches Poll
Rank	Team (First Place Votes)	Points
1.	Northern Kentucky (18)	435
2.	Milwaukee (10)	397
3.	Wright State (12)	392
4.	Cleveland State (1)	362
5.	Youngstown State (3)	342
6.	Oakland	280
7.	Robert Morris	186
8.	Purdue Fort Wayne	166
9.	Detroit Mercy	132
10.	IUPUI	116
11.	Green Bay	96

=== Preseason All-Horizon League ===
First team	Second team
Tristan Enaruna, Cleveland State	Jlynn Counter, IUPUI
BJ Freeman, Milwaukee	Sam Vinson, Northern Kentucky
Marques Warrick, Northern Kentucky	Tanner Holden, Wright State
Trey Townsend, Oakland	Brandon Noel, Wright State
Trey Calvin, Wright State	Brandon Rush, Youngstown State
Preseason Player of the Year: Trey Calvin, Wright State

== Regular season ==
=== Player of the Week awards ===
Week	Player of the Week	Freshman of the Week
1	Rasheed Bello, Purdue Fort Wayne	Corey Hadnot II, Purdue Fort Wayne
2	Quinton Morton-Robertson, Purdue Fort Wayne	Corey Hadnot II (2), Purdue Fort Wayne
3	Tristan Enaruna, Cleveland State	Corey Hadnot II (3), Purdue Fort Wayne
4	Marques Warrick, Northern Kentucky	Drey Carter, Wright State
5	Ziggy Reid, Youngstown State	Gabe Dynes, Youngstown State
6	Drew Loder, Cleveland State	Jeramiah Israel, Northern Kentucky
7	Tristan Enaruna, Cleveland State	David Douglas Jr., Green Bay
8	Noah Reynolds, Green Bay	Corey Hadnot II (4), Purdue Fort Wayne
9	Trey Townsend, Oakland	Corey Hadnot II (5), Purdue Fort Wayne
10	Noah Reynolds (2), Green Bay	David Douglas Jr. (2), Grren Bay
11	Marques Warrick (2), Northern Kentucky	Marcus Hall, Green Bay
12	Trey Calvin, Wright State	David Douglas Jr. (3), Green Bay
13	BJ Freeman, Milwaukee	David Douglas Jr. (4), Green Bay
13	Blake Lampman, Oakland	David Douglas Jr. (4), Green Bay
14	Preston Ruedinger, Green Bay	Randall Pettus II, Northern Kentucky
15	Jack Gohlke, Oakland	Randall Pettus II (2), Northern Kentucky
16	BJ Freeman, Milwaukee (2)	Gabe Dynes (2), Youngstown State
16	Brandon Noel, Wright State	Gabe Dynes (2), Youngstown State

School	POTW	FOTW
Cleveland State	3	0
Detroit Mercy	0	0
Green Bay	3	5
IUPUI	0	0
Milwaukee	2	0
Northern Kentucky	2	3
Oakland	3	0
Purdue Fort Wayne	2	5
Robert Morris	0	0
Wright State	2	1
Youngstown State	1	2

=== Conference matrix ===
	CSU	DET	GB	IUPUI	MKE	NKU	OAK	PFW	RMU	WSU	YSU
vs. Cleveland State	–	0–2	2–0	0–2	2–0	1–1	1–1	0–2	0–2	2–0	1–1
vs. Detroit Mercy	2–0	–	2–0	1–1	2–0	2–0	2–0	2–0	2–0	2–0	2–0
vs. Green Bay	0–2	0–2	–	0–2	1–1	2–0	1–1	2–0	0–2	0–2	1–1
vs. IUPUI	2–0	1–1	2–0	–	2–0	2–0	2–0	1–1	2–0	2–0	2–0
vs. Milwaukee	0–2	0–2	1–1	0–2	–	1–1	2–0	0–2	1–1	1–1	2–0
vs. Northern Kentucky	1–1	0–2	0–2	0–2	1–1	–	1–1	2–0	0–2	2–0	1–1
vs. Oakland	1–1	0–2	1–1	0–2	0–2	1–1	–	1–1	0–2	1–1	0–2
vs. Purdue Fort Wayne	2–0	0–2	0–2	1–1	2–0	0–2	1–1	–	1–1	1–1	1–1
vs. Robert Morris	2–0	0–2	2–0	0–2	1–1	2–0	2–0	1–1	–	2–0	2–0
vs. Wright State	0–2	0–2	2–0	0–2	1–1	0–2	1–1	1–1	0–2	–	2–0
vs. Youngstown State	1–1	0–2	1–1	0–2	0–2	1–1	2–0	1–1	0–2	0–2	–
Total	11–9	1–19	13–7	2–18	12–8	12–8	15–5	11–9	6–14	13–7	14–6

=== Early season tournaments ===
The following table summarizes the multiple-team events (MTE) or early-season tournaments in which teams from the Horizon League will participate.

Team	Tournament	Location	Dates	Finish
Cleveland State	Viking Invitational	Cleveland, OH	November 22–25	1st
Detroit Mercy	Cincinnati/Ole Miss MTE	Cincinnati, OH; University, MS	November 10–14	N/A
Green Bay	Montana State MTE	Bozeman, MT	November 20–22	N/A
IUPUI	Rock Hill Classic	Rock Hill, SC	November 17–19	N/A
Milwaukee	Sunshine Slam	Daytona Beach, FL	November 20–21	3rd
Northern Kentucky	NKU Thanksgiving Tournament	Highland Heights, KY	November 24–26	1st
Oakland	Cayman Islands Classic	George Town, Cayman Islands	November 19–21	5th
Purdue Fort Wayne	Arizona Tip-Off	Glendale, AZ	November 17–19	1st
Robert Morris	Urban-Bennett Memorial Classic	Moon Township, PA	November 24–26	N/A
Wright State	Gulf Coast Showcase	Estero, FL	November 21–23	3rd
Youngstown State	Lake Erie Classic	Youngstown, OH; Painsville, OH	November 17–19	N/A

== Postseason ==
=== Horizon League tournament ===
The conference tournament will be played from March 5 to March 12, 2023. The first round and quarterfinals are hosted at campus sites, while the semifinals and finals are held at Indiana Farmers Coliseum in Indianapolis, Indiana. Teams are seeded by conference record, with ties broken by record between the tied teams followed by record against the regular-season champion, if necessary. The top five teams receive a bye to the quarterfinals and the bracket is re-seeded after every round.

The Horizon League does not use a fixed bracket tournament system, and pairings are re-seeded after the first and second rounds.

First round Tuesday, March 5
8	Purdue Fort Wayne	78
9	Robert Morris	63
7	Cleveland State	85
10	IUPUI	66
6	Milwaukee	83
11	Detroit Mercy	79

Quarterfinals; Thursday, March 7
1	Oakland	75
8	Purdue Fort Wayne	65
4	Wright State	97
5	Northern Kentucky	99*
2	Youngstown State	70
7	Cleveland State	82
3	Green Bay	84
6	Milwaukee	95

Semifinals; Monday, March 11
1	Oakland	74
7	Cleveland State	71
5	Northern Kentucky	75
6	Milwaukee	82

Championship; Tuesday, March 12
1	Oakland	83
6	Milwaukee	76

=== NCAA Tournament ===
As the conference champion, Oakland received an automatic bid to the 2024 NCAA Division I men's basketball tournament.

Seed	Region	School	First Four	First round	Second round	Sweet Sixteen	Elite Eight	Final Four	Championship
14	South	Oakland	―	defeated (3) Kentucky 80–76	lost to (11) NC State 73–79 (OT)	―	―	―	―

=== College Basketball Invitational ===
Cleveland State accepted a bid to the 2024 College Basketball Invitational after finishing as semifinalists in the conference tournament.

Seed	School	First round	Quarterfinals	Semifinals	Finals
9	Cleveland State	defeated (8) Northern Colorado 51–49	lost to (1) High Point 74–93	−	−

=== CollegeInsider.com Postseason Tournament ===
Purdue Fort Wayne accepted a bid to the 2024 CollegeInsider.com Postseason Tournament after finishing as quarterfinalists in the conference tournament.

Bracket	School	First round	Quarterfinals	Semifinals	Finals
Jim Phelan Classic	Purdue Fort Wayne	−	defeated Bowling Green 77–75	defeated Tarleton State 73–72	lost to Norfolk State 67–75

== National awards ==
=== Midseason watchlists ===
Below is a table of notable midseason watch lists.

Player	Henson
Rasheed Bello, Purdue Fort Wayne	✓
Trey Townsend, Oakland	Winner
Marques Warrick, Northern Kentucky	✓

== Conference awards ==
**2024 Horizon League Men's Basketball Individual Awards**
Award	Recipient(s)
Player of the Year	Trey Townsend, Oakland
Coach of the Year	Sundance Wicks, Green Bay
Defensive Player of the Year	Trey Robinson, Northern Kentucky
Sixth Man of the Year	Jack Gohlke, Oakland
Freshman of the Year	David Douglas Jr., Green Bay
Newcomer of the Year	Noah Reynolds, Green Bay
Sportsmanship Award	Marques Warrick, Northern kentucky

**2024 Horizon Men's Basketball All-Conference Teams**
First Team	Second Team	Third Team	Defensive Team	Freshman Team
Tristan Enaruna, CSU; Noah Reynolds, GB; Marques Warrick, NKU; Trey Townsend, OAK; Trey Calvin, WSU	BJ Freeman, MKE; Blake Lampman, OAK; Brandon Noel, WSU; DJ Burns, YSU; Ziggy Reid, YSU	Rasheed Bello, PFW; Jalen Jackson, PFW; Markeese Hastings, RMU; Tanner Holden, WSU; Brett Thompson, YSU	Trey Robinson, NKU; Rasheed Bello, PFW; Anthony Roberts, PFW; DJ Burns, YSU; Gabe Dynes, YSU	David Douglas Jr., GB; Marcus Hall, GB; Randall Pettus II, NKU; Corey Hadnot II, PFW; Gabe Dynes, YSU

**2024 Horizon Men's Basketball**
**All-Tournament Team**
**Trey Townsend, OAK**
Jack Gohlke, OAK
Faizon Fields, MKE
BJ Freeman, MKE
Trey Robinson, NKU
**Bold** denotes MVP

== Attendance ==
=== Average home attendances ===
Note: Figures include conference tournament

#	Team	GP	Cumulative	High	Low	Avg.
1	Wright State	16	65,069	5,860	3,138	4,067
2	Northern Kentucky	15	49,052	4,935	2,340	3,270
3	Youngstown State	17	43,183	6,001	1,430	2,540
4	Oakland	13	35,715	3,721	1,000	2,747
5	Green Bay	14	34,161	5,490	1,379	2,440
6	Milwaukee	16	32,554	4,037	1,297	2,035
7	Cleveland State	17	28,385	2,399	1,281	1,670
8	Purdue Fort Wayne	16	20,074	1,886	816	1,255
9	Robert Morris	16	14,791	1,555	625	924
10	IUPUI	14	14,675	4,867	548	1,048
11	Detroit Mercy	17	9,061	1,211	420	824
Total		165	346,720	6,001	420	2,101
