= List of Oakland Golden Grizzlies men's basketball head coaches =

The following is a list of Oakland Golden Grizzlies men's basketball head coaches. The Golden Grizzlies have had five coaches in their 50-season history. The team is currently coached by Greg Kampe.

Through 2024–25 season

Tenure	Coach	Years	Record	Pct.
1967–68	Dick Robinson	1	6–15	.286
1968–76	Gene Bolden	8	89–114	.438
1976–79	Jim Mitchell *	4	27–56	.325
1979–84	Lee Frederick *	6	63–72	.467
1984–present	Greg Kampe	41	715–555	.563
Totals	5 coaches	60 seasons	900–812	.526

* The 1978–79 season was coached by both Mitchell and Frederick.
