= 2023–24 Robert Morris Colonials men's basketball team =

American college basketball season

2023–24 Robert Morris Colonials men's basketball
- Conference: Horizon League
- Record: 10–22 (6–14 Horizon)
- Head coach: Andrew Toole (14th season)
- Associate head coach: Mike Iuzzolino
- Assistant coaches: Vince Johnson; Dave Fedor
- Home arena: UPMC Events Center

2023–24 Horizon League men's basketball standings
	Conf.				Overall
Team	W		L	PCT	W		L	PCT
Oakland †	15	–	5	.750	24	–	12	.667
Youngstown State	14	–	6	.700	22	–	10	.688
Green Bay	13	–	7	.650	18	–	14	.563
Wright State	13	–	7	.650	18	–	14	.563
Northern Kentucky	12	–	8	.600	18	–	15	.545
Milwaukee	12	–	8	.600	20	–	15	.571
Cleveland State	11	–	9	.550	21	–	15	.583
Purdue Fort Wayne	11	–	9	.550	23	–	13	.639
Robert Morris	6	–	14	.300	10	–	22	.313
IUPUI	2	–	18	.100	6	–	26	.188
Detroit Mercy	1	–	19	.050	1	–	31	.031
† 2024 Horizon League tournament winner

The 2023–24 Robert Morris Colonials men's basketball team represented Robert Morris University during the 2023–24 NCAA Division I men's basketball season. The Colonials, led by 14th-year head coach Andrew Toole, played their home games at the UPMC Events Center located in Moon Township, Pennsylvania as members of the Horizon League. They finished the season 10–21, 6–14 in Horizon League play to finish in ninth place. As the No. 9 seed in the Horizon League tournament, they were defeated by Purdue Fort Wayne in the first round.

== Previous season ==
The Colonials finished the 2022–23 season 15–16, 10–10 in Horizon League play to finish in a tie for sixth place. As the No. 6 seed in the Horizon League tournament, they defeated IUPUI in the first round to advance to the quarterfinal round, where they fell to Cleveland State in overtime.

== Roster ==
2023–24 Robert Morris Colonials men's basketball team
Players
Coaches

Pos.	#	Name	Height	Weight	Year	Previous school	Hometown
F	0	Markeese Hastings	6 ft 7 in (2.01 m)	195 lb (88 kg)	GS	Western Michigan	Grand Rapids, MI
G	1	Justice Williams	6 ft 4 in (1.93 m)	175 lb (79 kg)	Jr	LSU	Philadelphia, PA
G	3	Tanner O’Grady	6 ft 0 in (1.83 m)	175 lb (79 kg)	Jr	Upper St. Clair HS	Philadelphia, PA
G	5	TJ Wainwright	6 ft 3 in (1.91 m)	180 lb (82 kg)	So	Montverde Academy	Los Angeles, CA
G	6	Alfredo Boglio	6 ft 3 in (1.91 m)	175 lb (79 kg)	Fr	Juvi Cremona	Novara, Italy
F	7	Alvaro Folgueiras	6 ft 9 in (2.06 m)	215 lb (98 kg)	Fr	DME Academy, FL	Málaga, Spain
G	10	Vasalije Serafimoski	6 ft 6 in (1.98 m)	170 lb (77 kg)	So	La Roche University	Gostivar, North Macedonia
F	11	Stephaun Walker	6 ft 7 in (2.01 m)	205 lb (93 kg)	So	Calvin Coolidge High	Washington, DC.
G	12	Jackson Last	6 ft 5 in (1.96 m)	195 lb (88 kg)	Jr	Salt Lake CC	Hurricane, UT
F	13	Antallah Sandlin’El	6 ft 8 in (2.03 m)	205 lb (93 kg)	Fr	Lincoln North Star	Lincoln, NE
G	23	Chris Ford	6 ft 5 in (1.96 m)	200 lb (91 kg)	Jr	Davidson	Charlotte, NC
G/F	31	Cyril Arvanitis	6 ft 3 in (1.91 m)	185 lb (84 kg)	So	Red Bank Catholic HS	Elberon, NJ
G	32	Josh Corbin	6 ft 3 in (1.91 m)	190 lb (86 kg)	Sr	Winthrop	Gahanna, OH
G	42	Ben Krystkowiak	6 ft 4 in (1.93 m)	175 lb (79 kg)	So	IMG Academy	San Diego, CA
F	50	Trey James	6 ft 9 in (2.06 m)	235 lb (107 kg)	Jr	Iona	Inez, KY

Head coach

- Andrew Toole (Pennsylvania)

Assistant coach(es)

- Mike Iuzzolino (Saint Francis (PA))
- Vince Johnson (St. Thomas Aquinas)
- Dave Fedor (Rutgers)

Legend

- (C) Team captain
- (S) Suspended
- (I) Ineligible
- (W) Walk-on
- Injured
- Current redshirt

Roster
Last update: November 7, 2023

== Schedule and results ==
Date time, TV	Rank^{#}	Opponent^{#}	Result	Record	Site (attendance) city, state
Exhibition
October 27, 2023*; 7:00 pm		Penn State	L 59-88	–	UPMC Events Center; Moon Township, PA
Regular season
November 6, 2023*; 8:00 pm		at Xavier	L 63-77	0–1	Cintas Center (10,224); Cincinnati, OH
November 9, 2023*; 7:00 pm, ESPN+		Point Park	W 66–56	1–1	UPMC Events Center (1,016); Moon Township, PA
November 12, 2023*; 7:00 pm, ESPN+		at Towson	L 62–66	1–2	SECU Arena (1,903); Towson, MD
November 17, 2023*; 7:00 pm, B1G+		at Wisconsin	L 68–78	1–3	Kohl Center (14,189); Madison, WI
November 24, 2023*; 4:00 pm, ESPN+		Jacksonville; Urban-Bennett Memorial Classic	L 65–74	1–4	UPMC Events Center (838); Moon Township, PA
November 26, 2023*; 2:00 pm, ESPN+		Fairleigh Dickinson; Urban-Bennett Memorial Classic	W 97–86	2–4	UPMC Events Center (822); Moon Township, PA
November 29, 2023; 7:00 pm, ESPN+		at Northern Kentucky	L 59–77	2–5 (0–1)	Truist Arena (2,770); Highland Heights, KY
December 2, 2023; 2:00 pm		Youngstown State	L 57–71	2–6 (0–2)	UPMC Events Center (1,229); Moon Township, PA
December 6, 2023*; 7:00 pm, ESPN+		at Canisius	L 80–87	2–7	Koessler Athletic Center (562); Buffalo, NY
December 11, 2023*; 7:00 pm, ESPN+		Delaware	L 69–73	2–8	UPMC Events Center (953); Moon Township, PA
December 17, 2023*; 2:00 pm, ESPN+		Saint Vincent	W 95–46	3–8	UPMC Events Center (729); Moon Township, PA
December 20, 2023*; 7:00 pm		at Saint Francis	W 75–73	4–8	DeGol Arena (336); Loretto, PA
December 22, 2023*; 2:00 pm, ESPN+		Cornell	L 85–90	4–9	UPMC Events Center (625); Moon Township, PA
December 29, 2023; 8:00 pm, ESPN+		at Milwaukee	L 75–78	4–10 (0–3)	UW–Milwaukee Panther Arena (1,722); Milwaukee, WI
December 31, 2023; 1:00 pm, ESPN+		at Green Bay	L 61–78	4–11 (0–4)	Resch Center (1,650); Ashwaubenon, WI
January 4, 2024; 7:00 pm, ESPN+		IUPUI	W 92–48	5–11 (1–4)	UPMC Events Center (641); Moon Township, PA
January 10, 2024; 7:00 pm, ESPN+		Wright State	L 76–101	5–12 (1–5)	UPMC Events Center (741); Moon Township, PA
January 12, 2024; 7:00 pm, ESPN+		Purdue Fort Wayne	W 91–88 ^{OT}	6–12 (2–5)	UPMC Events Center (972); Moon Township, PA
January 17, 2024; 7:00 pm, ESPN+		Detroit Mercy	W 102–99 ^{2OT}	7–12 (3–5)	UPMC Events Center (884); Moon Township, PA
January 20, 2024; 12:00 pm, ESPN+		IUPUI	W 80–63	8–12 (4–5)	Indiana Farmers Coliseum (768); Indianapolis, IN
January 28, 2024; 1:00 pm, ESPN+		at Cleveland State	L 64–66	8–13 (4–6)	Wolstein Center (1,476); Cleveland, OH
February 1, 2024; 7:00 pm, ESPN+		at Oakland	L 72–87	8–14 (4–7)	Athletics Center O'rena (2,752); Auburn Hills, MI
February 3, 2024; 2:00 pm, ESPN+		at Detroit Mercy	W 75–67	9–14 (5–7)	Calihan Hall (812); Detroit, MI
February 8, 2024; 7:00 pm, ESPN+		Green Bay	L 76–81 ^{OT}	9–15 (5–8)	UPMC Events Center (826); Moon Township, PA
February 10, 2024; 2:00 pm, ESPN+		Milwaukee	W 71–60	10–15 (6–8)	UPMC Events Center (1,084); Moon Township, PA
February 14, 2024; 6:30 pm, ESPN+		at Youngstown State	L 77–87	10–16 (6–9)	Beeghly Center (2,261); Youngstown, OH
February 17, 2024; 1:00 pm, ESPN+		at Wright State	L 71–101	10–17 (6–10)	Nutter Center (5,057); Fairborn, OH
February 22, 2024; 7:00 pm, ESPN+		Oakland	L 43–63	10–18 (6–11)	UPMC Events Center (922); Moon Township, PA
February 25, 2024; 2:00 pm, ESPN+		Cleveland State	L 71–73	10–19 (6–12)	UPMC Events Center (1,555); Moon Township, PA
February 28, 2024; 7:00 pm, ESPN+		Northern Kentucky	L 60–70	10–20 (6–13)	UPMC Events Center (954); Moon Township, PA
March 2, 2024; 7:00 pm, ESPN+		at Purdue Fort Wayne	L 65–83	10–21 (6–14)	Hilliard Gates Sports Center (992); Fort Wayne, IN
Horizon League tournament
March 5, 2024; 7:00 pm, ESPN+	(9)	at (8) Purdue Fort Wayne; First round	L 63–78	10–22	Hilliard Gates Sports Center (959); Fort Wayne, IN
*Non-conference game. ^{#}Rankings from AP Poll. (#) Tournament seedings in parentheses. All times are in Eastern.
