= 2023–24 Northern Kentucky Norse men's basketball team =

American college basketball season

2023–24 Northern Kentucky Norse men's basketball
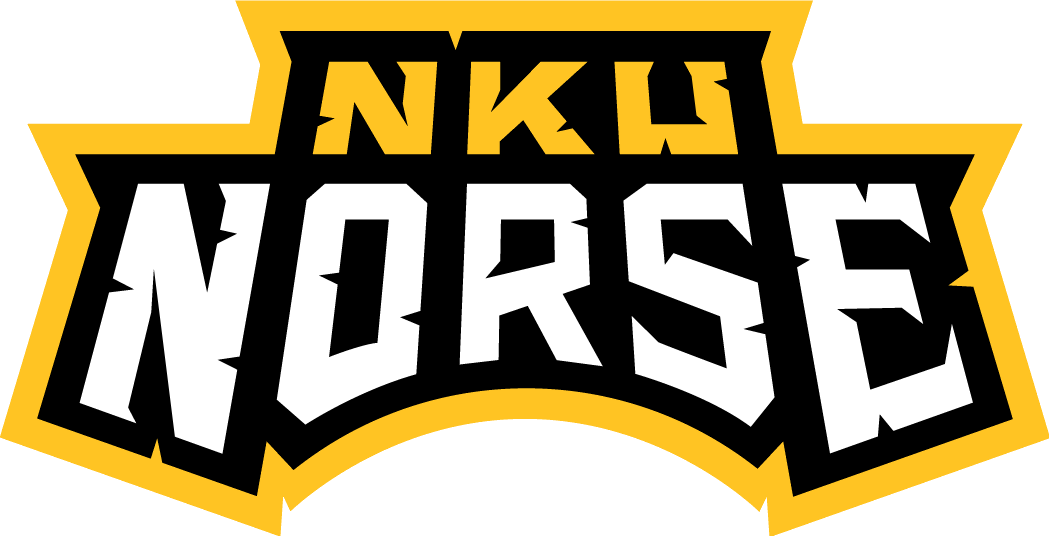
- Conference: Horizon League
- Record: 18–15 (12–8 Horizon)
- Head coach: Darrin Horn (5th season)
- Associate head coach: Eric Haut
- Assistant coaches: Simon McCormack; David Harris; Isaac Wodajo
- Home arena: Truist Arena

2023–24 Horizon League men's basketball standings
| | Conf. | | | | Overall |
| Team | W | | L | PCT | W | | L | PCT |
|---|---|---|---|---|---|---|---|---|
| Oakland † | 15 | – | 5 | .750 | 24 | – | 12 | .667 |
| Youngstown State | 14 | – | 6 | .700 | 22 | – | 10 | .688 |
| Green Bay | 13 | – | 7 | .650 | 18 | – | 14 | .563 |
| Wright State | 13 | – | 7 | .650 | 18 | – | 14 | .563 |
| Northern Kentucky | 12 | – | 8 | .600 | 18 | – | 15 | .545 |
| Milwaukee | 12 | – | 8 | .600 | 20 | – | 15 | .571 |
| Cleveland State | 11 | – | 9 | .550 | 21 | – | 15 | .583 |
| Purdue Fort Wayne | 11 | – | 9 | .550 | 23 | – | 13 | .639 |
| Robert Morris | 6 | – | 14 | .300 | 10 | – | 22 | .313 |
| IUPUI | 2 | – | 18 | .100 | 6 | – | 26 | .188 |
| Detroit Mercy | 1 | – | 19 | .050 | 1 | – | 31 | .031 |
† 2024 Horizon League tournament winner

The 2023–24 Northern Kentucky Norse men's basketball team represented Northern Kentucky University during the 2023–24 NCAA Division I men's basketball season. The Norse, led by fifth-year head coach Darrin Horn, played their home games at Truist Arena in Highland Heights, Kentucky as members of the Horizon League.

The Norse finished the season 18–15, 12–8 in Horizon League play, to finish in a tie for fifth place. They defeated Wright State, before falling to Milwaukee in the semifinals of the Horizon League tournament.

== Previous season ==
The Norse finished the 2022–23 season 22–13, 14–6 in Horizon League play, to finish in a three-way tie for second place. They defeated Oakland, Youngstown State and Cleveland State to win the Horizon League tournament, earning the conference's automatic bid into the NCAA tournament. In the NCAA tournament, they received the #16 seed in the Midwest Region. They lost to the region's top seed Houston in the first round.

== Roster ==
2023–24 Northern Kentucky Norse men's basketball team
Players
Coaches

| Pos. | # | Name | Height | Weight | Year | Previous school | Hometown |
|---|---|---|---|---|---|---|---|
| G | 1 | Trey Robinson | 6 ft 8 in (2.03 m) | 220 lb (100 kg) | Sr | Hamilton High School | Hamilton, OH |
| G | 2 | Sam Vinson | 6 ft 5 in (1.96 m) | 205 lb (93 kg) | Jr | Highlands High School | Fort Thomas, KY |
| G | 3 | Marques Warrick | 6 ft 2 in (1.88 m) | 185 lb (84 kg) | Sr | Henry Clay High School | Lexington, KY |
| F | 5 | LJ Wells | 6 ft 8 in (2.03 m) | 205 lb (93 kg) | So | Eau Claire Memorial High School | Eau Claire, WI |
| F | 10 | Cade Meyer | 6 ft 8 in (2.03 m) | 220 lb (100 kg) | Jr | Green Bay | Monroe, WI |
| G | 11 | Randall II Pettus | 6 ft 3 in (1.91 m) | 185 lb (84 kg) | Fr | Bessemer City High School | Bessemer City, NC |
| G | 12 | Mitchel Minor | 5 ft 10 in (1.78 m) | 175 lb (79 kg) | So | Scott High School | Taylor Mill, KY |
| G | 13 | Cole Sherman | 5 ft 11 in (1.8 m) | 190 lb (86 kg) | So | St. Xavier High School | Louisville, KY |
| G | 14 | Jeramiah Israel | 6 ft 3 in (1.91 m) | 190 lb (86 kg) | Fr | Lloyd Memorial High School | Erlanger, KY |
| F | 15 | Cesar Tchilombo | 6 ft 9 in (2.06 m) | 205 lb (93 kg) | RS Fr | The John Carroll School | Goma, DR Congo |
| G | 22 | Michael Bradley | 6 ft 0 in (1.83 m) | 185 lb (84 kg) | GS | Mercyhurst | San Antonio, TX |
| G | 32 | Fiston Ipassou | 6 ft 5 in (1.96 m) | — | Fr | Adelaide 36ers | Adelaide, Australia |
| G | 34 | Hubertas Pivorius | 6 ft 2 in (1.88 m) | 170 lb (77 kg) | Jr | Christopher Columbus High School | Vilnius, Lithuania |
| F | 40 | Keeyan Itejere | 6 ft 9 in (2.06 m) | 220 lb (100 kg) | So | Marquette | Knightdale, NC |

Head coach

- Darrin Horn (Western Kentucky)

Assistant coach(es)

- Eric Haut (Kent State)
- Simon McCormack (American)
- David Harris (Ashland)
- Isaac Wodajo (Texas)

Legend

- (C) Team captain
- (S) Suspended
- (I) Ineligible
- (W) Walk-on
- Injured
- Current redshirt

Roster
Last update: November 1, 2023

== Schedule and results ==
| Date time, TV | Rank^{#} | Opponent^{#} | Result | Record | Site (attendance) city, state |
Exhibition
| November 1, 2023*; 7:00 p.m. | | Mount St. Joseph | W 85–31 | | Truist Arena; Highland Heights, KY |
Regular season
| November 6, 2023*; 8:30 p.m., ESPN+ | | at Middle Tennessee | L 57–74 | 0–1 | Murphy Center (3,505); Murfreesboro, TN |
| November 9, 2023*; 11:00 p.m., P12N | | at Washington | L 67–75 | 0–2 | Alaska Airlines Arena (6,026); Seattle, WA |
| November 14, 2023*; 7:00 p.m., ESPN+ | | DePauw | W 85–68 | 1–2 | Truist Arena (3,124); Highland Heights, KY |
| November 19, 2023*; 2:00 p.m., ESPN+ | | at Cincinnati | L 66–90 | 1–3 | Fifth Third Arena (10,018); Cincinnati, OH |
| November 22, 2023*; 6:00 p.m., ESPN+ | | Texas A&M–Corpus Christi; NKU Thanksgiving Tournament | W 88–73 | 2–3 | Truist Arena (2,395); Highland Heights, KY |
| November 25, 2023*; 4:00 p.m., ESPN+ | | LIU; NKU Thanksgiving Tournament | W 72–64 | 3–3 | Truist Arena (2,340); Highland Heights, KY |
| November 29, 2023; 7:00 p.m., ESPN+ | | Robert Morris | W 77–59 | 4–3 (1–0) | Truist Arena (2,770); Highland Heights, KY |
| December 2, 2023; 12:00 p.m., ESPN+ | | at IUPUI | W 71–55 | 5–3 (2–0) | Indiana Farmers Coliseum (663); Indianapolis, IN |
| December 6, 2023*; 8:00 p.m., ESPN+ | | at Illinois State | L 59–62 | 5–4 | CEFCU Arena (3,215); Normal, IL |
| December 9, 2023*; 7:00 p.m., ESPN+ | | Akron | L 76–77 | 5–5 | Truist Arena (4,163); Highland Heights, KY |
| December 14, 2023*; 7:00 p.m., ESPN+ | | Cumberlands | W 94–59 | 6–5 | Truist Arena (2,475); Highland Heights, KY |
| December 17, 2023*; 4:00 p.m., ESPN+ | | at Eastern Kentucky | W 85–75 | 7–5 | Baptist Health Arena (3,046); Richmond, KY |
| December 21, 2023*; 10:00 p.m., ESPN+ | | at Saint Mary's | L 56–92 | 7–6 | University Credit Union Pavilion (2,877); Moraga, CA |
| December 29, 2023; 7:00 p.m., ESPN+ | | at Purdue Fort Wayne | L 60–73 | 7–7 (2–1) | Hilliard Gates Sports Center (1,107); Fort Wayne, IN |
| January 4, 2024; 7:00 p.m., ESPN+ | | Youngstown State | W 79–76 | 8–7 (3–1) | Alico Arena (3,105); Fort Myers, FL |
| January 7, 2024; 4:00 p.m., ESPN+ | | at Cleveland State | L 85–88 ^{OT} | 8–8 (3–2) | Wolstein Center (1,548); Cleveland, OH |
| January 10, 2024; 7:00 p.m., ESPN+ | | at Oakland | L 65–70 | 8–9 (3–3) | OU Credit Union O'rena (2,683); Auburn Hills, MI |
| January 13, 2024; 1:00 p.m., ESPN+ | | at Detroit Mercy | W 81–76 | 9–9 (4–3) | Calihan Hall (627); Detroit, MI |
| January 18, 2024; 7:00 p.m., ESPN+ | | Milwaukee | W 90–72 | 10–9 (5–3) | Truist Arena (3,405); Highland Heights, KY |
| January 20, 2024; 6:30 p.m., ESPN+ | | Green Bay | W 74–52 | 11–9 (6–3) | Truist Arena (4,935); Highland Heights, KY |
| January 25, 2024; 7:00 p.m., ESPN+ | | Purdue Fort Wayne | L 58–63 | 11–10 (6–4) | Truist Arena (3,079); Highland Heights, KY |
| January 28, 2024; 1:30 p.m., ESPN+ | | at Youngstown State | L 52–82 | 11–11 (6–5) | Beeghly Center (6,001); Youngstown, OH |
| February 4, 2024; 2:00 p.m., ESPN+ | | Wright State | L 78–85 | 11–12 (6–6) | Truist Arena (4,760); Highland Heights, KY |
| February 8, 2024; 7:00 p.m., ESPN+ | | Oakland | W 99–89 ^{OT} | 12–12 (7–6) | Truist Arena (2,702); Highland Heights, KY |
| February 10, 2024; 4:00 p.m., ESPN+ | | Detroit Mercy | W 79–67 | 13–12 (8–6) | Truist Arena (3,119); Highland Heights, KY |
| February 14, 2024; 7:00 p.m., ESPN+ | | at Green Bay | W 58–57 | 14–12 (9–6) | Resch Center (2,425); Ashwaubenon, WI |
| February 17, 2024; 8:00 p.m., ESPN+ | | at Milwaukee | L 72–73 | 14–13 (9–7) | UW–Milwaukee Panther Arena (2,509); Milwaukee, WI |
| February 22, 2024; 7:00 p.m., ESPN+ | | Cleveland State | W 75–73 | 15–13 (10–7) | Truist Arena (2,856); Highland Heights, KY |
| February 25, 2024; 2:00 p.m., ESPN+ | | IUPUI | W 80–64 | 16–13 (11–7) | Truist Arena (3,824); Highland Heights, KY |
| February 28, 2024; 7:00 p.m., ESPN+ | | at Robert Morris | W 70–60 | 17–13 (12–7) | UPMC Events Center (954); Moon Township, PA |
| March 2, 2024; 7:00 p.m., ESPN+ | | at Wright State | L 88–94 | 17–14 (12–8) | Nutter Center (5,232); Fairborn, OH |
Horizon League tournament
| March 7, 2024; 7:00 p.m., ESPN+ | (5) | at (4) Wright State; Quarterfinals | W 99–97 ^{OT} | 18–14 | Nutter Center (4,725); Fairborn, OH |
| March 11, 2024; 9:30 p.m., ESPN2 | (5) | vs. (6) Milwaukee; Semifinals | L 75–82 | 18–15 | Indiana Farmers Coliseum; Indianapolis, IN |
*Non-conference game. ^{#}Rankings from AP poll. (#) Tournament seedings in parentheses. All times are in Eastern.
