= 2023–24 IUPUI Jaguars men's basketball team =

American college basketball season

2023–2024 IUPUI Jaguars men's basketball
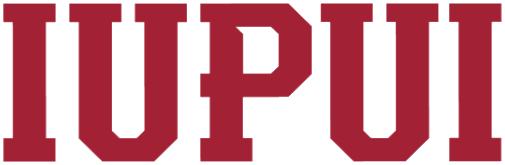
- Conference: Horizon League
- Record: 6–26 (2–18 Horizon)
- Head coach: Matt Crenshaw (3rd season)
- Assistant coaches: Antwain Banks (3rd season); Tommy Strine (3rd season); Keith Oddo (1st season)
- Home arena: Indiana Farmers Coliseum

2023–24 Horizon League men's basketball standings
	Conf.				Overall
Team	W		L	PCT	W		L	PCT
Oakland †	15	–	5	.750	24	–	12	.667
Youngstown State	14	–	6	.700	22	–	10	.688
Green Bay	13	–	7	.650	18	–	14	.563
Wright State	13	–	7	.650	18	–	14	.563
Northern Kentucky	12	–	8	.600	18	–	15	.545
Milwaukee	12	–	8	.600	20	–	15	.571
Cleveland State	11	–	9	.550	21	–	15	.583
Purdue Fort Wayne	11	–	9	.550	23	–	13	.639
Robert Morris	6	–	14	.300	10	–	22	.313
IUPUI	2	–	18	.100	6	–	26	.188
Detroit Mercy	1	–	19	.050	1	–	31	.031
† 2024 Horizon League tournament winner

The 2023–24 IUPUI Jaguars men's basketball team represented Indiana University–Purdue University Indianapolis in the 2023–24 NCAA Division I men's basketball season. The Jaguars, led by third-year head coach Matt Crenshaw, played their home games at Indiana Farmers Coliseum in Indianapolis, Indiana as members of the Horizon League. They finished the season 6–25, 2–18 in Horizon League play, to finish in tenth place. As the No. 10 seed in the Horizon League tournament, they lost Cleveland State in the first round.

This was the final season for IUPUI as an institution. In August 2022, the Indiana University and Purdue University systems announced that they would dissolve IUPUI at the end of the 2023–24 academic year, with the vast majority of academic programs moving to the new Indiana University Indianapolis and a few programs becoming affiliated with Purdue. The athletic program transferred to the new IU Indianapolis, with an athletic branding of IU Indy.

== Previous season ==
The Jaguars finished the 2022–23 season 5–27, 2–18 in Horizon League play, to finish in tenth in the conference. They lost in the first round of the Horizon League tournament to Robert Morris.

== Offseason ==
=== Departures ===
Departures
Name	Pos.	Height	Weight	Year	Hometown	Notes
Jonah Carrasco	F	6' 9"	220	Graduate student	Wichita, KS	Graduated
Caleb Crane	G	6' 2"	190	RS Freshman	Avon, IN	
Zach Gunn	F	6' 6"	210	Graduate student	Fishers, IN	Graduated
Kaleb Edwards	G	6' 3"	175	RS Freshman	Fishers, IN	Transferred to Parkland College
Chris Osten	F	6' 9"	215	Graduate student	Crowley, LA	Graduated
Boston Stanton III	G	6' 5"	190	Sophomore	Denver, CO	Transferred to Newman University
Bobby Wonnell	G	6' 2"	165	Freshman	Indianapolis, IN	Transferred to Earlham College

=== Incoming transfers ===
Transfers
Name	Pos.	Height	Weight	Year	Hometown	Previous school
Kidtrell Blocker	G	6' 5"	185	Junior	Rochester, NY	Buffalo
Yves Nkomba	C	6' 11"	220	Senior	Leeds, England	Kennesaw State
Abdou Samb	F	6' 8"	210	Sophomore	Upper Marlboro, MD	Rhode Island
Qwanzi Samuels	F	6' 9"	205	Graduate student	District Heights, MD	George Washington

== Roster ==
2023–24 IUPUI Jaguars men's basketball team
Players
Coaches

Pos.	#	Name	Height	Weight	Year	Hometown
G	0	Jlynn Counter	6 ft 3 in (1.91 m)	185 lb (84 kg)	Jr	Oklahoma City, OK
G	1	Vincent II Brady	6 ft 4 in (1.93 m)	185 lb (84 kg)	So	Indianapolis, Indiana
F	2	John Egbuta	6 ft 6 in (1.98 m)	215 lb (98 kg)	Sr	New York, NY
G	4	Bryce Monroe	5 ft 11 in (1.8 m)	170 lb (77 kg)	Sr	San Francisco, CA
G	5	Amhad Jarrard	6 ft 4 in (1.93 m)	180 lb (82 kg)	So	Indianapolis, IN
F	7	Qwanzi Samuels	6 ft 9 in (2.06 m)	205 lb (93 kg)	GS	District Heights, MD
G	8	Kidtrell Blocker	6 ft 5 in (1.96 m)	185 lb (84 kg)	Jr	Rochester, NY
F	9	Abdou Samb	6 ft 8 in (2.03 m)	210 lb (95 kg)	So	Upper Marlboro, MD
G/F	10	Cooper Dewitt	6 ft 6 in (1.98 m)	195 lb (88 kg)	Sr	Pasco, WA
G	11	Daylan Hamilton	6 ft 3 in (1.91 m)	180 lb (82 kg)	Sr	Houston, TX
G	12	Armon Jarrard	6 ft 3 in (1.91 m)	170 lb (77 kg)	So	Indianapolis, IN
G	13	DJ Jackson	6 ft 4 in (1.93 m)	175 lb (79 kg)	So	Mississauga, ON
G	14	Braden Allen (W)	6 ft 3 in (1.91 m)	170 lb (77 kg)	RS Fr	Brazil, IN
C	15	Yves Nkomba	6 ft 11 in (2.11 m)	220 lb (100 kg)	Sr	Leeds, England
F	20	Derek Peterson (W)	6 ft 2 in (1.88 m)	175 lb (79 kg)	Sr	Greenwood, IN

Head coach

- Matt Crenshaw (IUPUI)

Assistant coach(es)

- Antwain Banks (Kentucky State)
- Tommy Strine (Anderson (IN))
- Keith Oddo (Louisville)

Legend

- (C) Team captain
- (S) Suspended
- (I) Ineligible
- (W) Walk-on
- Injured
- Current redshirt

Roster
Last update: January 19, 2025

== Schedule and results ==
Date time, TV	Rank^{#}	Opponent^{#}	Result	Record	High points	High rebounds	High assists	Site (attendance) city, state
Regular season
November 6, 2023*; 11:00 a.m., ESPN+		Spalding	W 70–63	1–0	20 – Counter	7 – Samuels	2 – tied	Indiana Farmers Coliseum (4,867); Indianapolis, IN
November 10, 2023*; 9:00 p.m., ESPN+		at Valparaiso	W 66–56	2–0	20 – Monroe	10 – Egbuta	4 – Counter	Athletics–Recreation Center (1,809); Valparaiso, IN
November 14, 2023*; 7:00 p.m., ESPN+		at Indiana State	L 57–96	2–1	19 – Counter	5 – Counter	1 – tied	Hulman Center (3,470); Terre Haute, IN
November 17, 2023*; 7:30 p.m., ESPN+		vs. Elon; Winthrop Invitational	L 72–86	2–2	20 – Counter	9 – Egbuta	4 – Monroe	Winthrop Coliseum (909); Rock Hill, SC
November 18, 2023*; 5:00 p.m., ESPN+		at Winthrop; Winthrop Invitational	L 61–74	2–3	15 – Blocker	9 – Counter	1 – tied	Winthrop Coliseum (711); Rock Hill, SC
November 19, 2023*; 12:00 p.m., ESPN+		vs. Holy Cross; Winthrop Invitational	L 61–74	2–4	16 – Monroe	7 – tied	4 – Counter	Winthrop Coliseum (944); Rock Hill, SC
November 25, 2023*; 2:00 p.m., ESPN+		Cleary	W 78–70	3–4	21 – Counter	12 – Samuels	5 – Monroe	Indiana Farmers Coliseum (649); Indianapolis, IN
November 29, 2023; 7:00 p.m., ESPN+		at Wright State	L 74–103	3–5 (0–1)	20 – Monroe	9 – Blocker	4 – Blocker	Nutter Center (3,531); Fairborn, OH
December 2, 2023; 12:00 p.m., ESPN+		Northern Kentucky	L 55–71	3–6 (0–2)	17 – Counter	6 – Samuels	4 – Counter	Indiana Farmers Coliseum (663); Indianapolis, IN
December 7, 2023*; 8:00 p.m., ESPN+		at Eastern Illinois	L 58–75	3–7	19 – Counter	6 – tied	3 – Monroe	Lantz Arena (1,338); Charleston, IL
December 12, 2023*; 8:00 p.m., BIG+		at Minnesota	L 65–101	3–8	20 – Monroe	10 – Samuels	5 – Counter	Williams Arena (6,581); Minneapolis, MN
December 16, 2023*; 12:00 p.m., ESPN+		Lindenwood	L 67–73	3–9	23 – Counter	9 – Samuels	4 – Counter	Indiana Farmers Coliseum (619); Indianapolis, IN
December 21, 2023*; 7:00 p.m., ESPN+		Defiance College	W 90–67	4–9	18 – Counter	6 – Dewitt	3 – Brady II	Indiana Farmers Coliseum (602); Indianapolis, IN
December 29, 2023; 12:00 p.m., ESPN+		Detroit Mercy	W 67–55	5–9 (1–2)	17 – Brady II	8 – Samb	3 – Monroe	Indiana Farmers Coliseum (709); Indianapolis, IN
December 31, 2023; 2:00 p.m., ESPN+		Cleveland State	L 77–86	5–10 (1–3)	16 – tied	6 – tied	6 – Monroe	Indiana Farmers Coliseum (816); Indianapolis, IN
January 4, 2024; 2:00 p.m., ESPN+		at Robert Morris	L 48–92	5–11 (1–4)	12 – tied	6 – Brady II	2 – tied	UPMC Events Center (641); Moon Township, PA
January 7, 2024; 1:30 p.m., ESPN+		at Youngstown State	L 65–75	5–12 (1–5)	18 – Brady II	13 – Samuels	7 – Monroe	Beeghly Center (1,649); Youngstown, OH
January 10, 2024; 12:00 p.m., ESPN+		Green Bay	L 58–68	5–13 (1–6)	15 – Brady II	6 – Samuels	4 – Counter	Indiana Farmers Coliseum (548); Indianapolis, IN
January 13, 2024; 7:00 p.m., ESPN+		Oakland	L 66–88	5–14 (1–7)	17 – Counter	5 – tied	4 – Jackson	Indiana Farmers Coliseum (809); Indianapolis, IN
January 17, 2024; 7:00 p.m., ESPN+		at Purdue Fort Wayne	W 85–79	6–14 (2–7)	18 – Counter	10 – Samuels	4 – tied	Hilliard Gates Sports Center (1,164); Fort Wayne, IN
January 20, 2024; 12:00 p.m., ESPN+		Robert Morris	L 63–80	6–15 (2–8)	23 – Counter	5 – Samb	4 – Counter	Indiana Farmers Coliseum (768); Indianapolis, IN
January 25, 2024; 12:00 p.m., ESPN+		Youngstown State	L 50–78	6–16 (2–9)	11 – Monroe	5 – tied	2 – tied	Indiana Farmers Coliseum (708); Indianapolis, IN
January 28, 2024; 12:00 p.m., ESPN+		Wright State	L 76–83	6–17 (2–10)	19 – Counter	8 – Samuels	3 – Counter	Indiana Farmers Coliseum (720); Indianapolis, IN
February 1, 2024; 12:00 p.m., ESPN+		at Green Bay	L 56–79	6–18 (2–11)	15 – Egbuta	6 – tied	4 – Brady II	Kress Events Center (5,490); Green Bay, WI
February 4, 2024; 2:00 p.m., ESPN+		at Milwaukee	L 67–87	6–19 (2–12)	18 – Monroe	7 – Jackson	4 – Monroe	UW–Milwaukee Panther Arena (1,616); Milwaukee, WI
February 10, 2024; 12:00 p.m., ESPN+		Purdue Fort Wayne	L 65–92	6–20 (2–13)	16 – Monroe	7 – Brady	4 – Monroe	Indiana Farmers Coliseum (1,017); Indianapolis, IN
February 14, 2024; 7:00 p.m., ESPN+		at Detroit Mercy	L 66–81	6–21 (2–14)	17 – Jackson	7 – Counter	7 – Counter	Calihan Hall (611); Detroit, MI
February 17, 2024; 3:00 p.m., ESPN+		at Oakland	L 59–107	6–22 (2–15)	17 – Jackson	6 – Samb	3 – tied	Athletics Center O'rena (2,941); Auburn Hills, MI
February 25, 2024; 2:00 p.m., ESPN+		at Northern Kentucky	L 64–80	6–23 (2–16)	16 – Counter	6 – Brady II	7 – Counter	Truist Arena (3,824); Highland Heights, KY
February 28, 2024; 7:00 p.m., ESPN+		Milwaukee	L 70–75	6–24 (2–17)	15 – Counter	6 – Brady II	6 – Monroe	Indiana Farmers Coliseum (1,180); Indianapolis, IN
March 2, 2024; 3:00 p.m., ESPN+		at Cleveland State	L 66–75	6–25 (2–18)	15 – Counter	6 – tied	3 – tied	Wolstein Center (2,129); Cleveland, OH
Horizon League tournament
March 5, 2024; 7:00 p.m., ESPN+	(10)	at (7) Cleveland State; First round	L 66–85	6–26	11 – tied	5 – Egbuta	3 – Monroe	Wolstein Center (1,333); Cleveland, OH
*Non-conference game. ^{#}Rankings from AP poll. (#) Tournament seedings in parentheses. All times are in Eastern.
