= 2023–24 Youngstown State Penguins men's basketball team =

American college basketball season

2023–24 Youngstown State Penguins men's basketball
- Conference: Horizon League
- Record: 22–10 (14–6 Horizon)
- Head coach: Jerrod Calhoun (7th season)
- Associate head coach: Ethan Faulkner
- Assistant coaches: Ben Asher; Mantoris Robinson
- Home arena: Beeghly Center

2023–24 Horizon League men's basketball standings
	Conf.				Overall
Team	W		L	PCT	W		L	PCT
Oakland †	15	–	5	.750	24	–	12	.667
Youngstown State	14	–	6	.700	22	–	10	.688
Green Bay	13	–	7	.650	18	–	14	.563
Wright State	13	–	7	.650	18	–	14	.563
Northern Kentucky	12	–	8	.600	18	–	15	.545
Milwaukee	12	–	8	.600	20	–	15	.571
Cleveland State	11	–	9	.550	21	–	15	.583
Purdue Fort Wayne	11	–	9	.550	23	–	13	.639
Robert Morris	6	–	14	.300	10	–	22	.313
IUPUI	2	–	18	.100	6	–	26	.188
Detroit Mercy	1	–	19	.050	1	–	31	.031
† 2024 Horizon League tournament winner

The 2023–24 Youngstown State Penguins men's basketball team represented Youngstown State University during the 2023–24 NCAA Division I men's basketball season. The Penguins, led by seventh-year head coach Jerrod Calhoun, played their home games at the Beeghly Center located in Youngstown, Ohio as members of the Horizon League.

== Previous season ==
The Penguins finished the 2022–23 season 23–8, 15–5 in Horizon League play to finish as Horizon League regular season champions. They defeated Detroit Mercy in the quarterfinal round of the Horizon League tournament, before suffering an upset loss to eventual tournament winners Northern Kentucky in the semifinals. As a regular season champion who didn't win their conference tournament, the Penguins received an automatic bid to play in the NIT, where they lost to Oklahoma State in the first round. With a final record of 24–10, the 2022–23 season marked the Penguins' best season in Division I play.

== Roster ==
2023–24 Youngstown State Penguins men's basketball team
Players
Coaches

Pos.	#	Name	Height	Weight	Year	Previous school	Hometown
G	0	Brandon Rush	6 ft 3 in (1.91 m)	195 lb (88 kg)	Sr	Fairleigh Dickinson	Warrensville Heights, Ohio
F	1	Ziggy Reid	6 ft 6 in (1.98 m)	245 lb (111 kg)	Sr	Merrimack	Baltimore, Maryland
F	2	Christian Kirkland	6 ft 9 in (2.06 m)	225 lb (102 kg)	Fr	Friends Select School	Philadelphia, Pennsylvania
G	3	EJ Farmer	6 ft 5 in (1.96 m)	185 lb (84 kg)	Jr	Toledo	Cleveland, Ohio
G	4	David Wilkerson	6 ft 4 in (1.93 m)	175 lb (79 kg)	So	Spartanburg Methodist	Lansing, Michigan
G	5	Brett Thompson	6 ft 1 in (1.85 m)	180 lb (82 kg)	Sr	Tennessee Tech	Oakland, California
C	10	Imanuel Zorgvol	7 ft 0 in (2.13 m)	215 lb (98 kg)	So	Northern Kentucky	Paramaribo, Suriname
G	11	Bryson Langdon	5 ft 9 in (1.75 m)	170 lb (77 kg)	Sr	Northern Kentucky	Chicago, Illinois
F	13	Jaylen Bates	6 ft 7 in (2.01 m)	215 lb (98 kg)	Sr	Florida A&M	Atlanta, Georgia
G	14	Dante DePante	6 ft 4 in (1.93 m)	190 lb (86 kg)	Fr	Central Catholic High School	Pittsburgh, Pennsylvania
G	20	Anthony Breland	6 ft 4 in (1.93 m)	190 lb (86 kg)	Fr	Moravian Prep	Newton, North Carolina
G	22	John Lovelace Jr.	6 ft 7 in (2.01 m)	205 lb (93 kg)	So	We Are United Prep	Milwaukee, Wisconsin
G	30	Tommy Fryda	6 ft 1 in (1.85 m)	180 lb (82 kg)	So	Boardman High School	Boardman, Ohio
C	45	Gabe Dynes	7 ft 3 in (2.21 m)	190 lb (86 kg)	Fr	Simon Kenton High School	Independence, Kentucky
F	55	DJ Burns	6 ft 7 in (2.01 m)	220 lb (100 kg)	Sr	Murray State	New Orleans, Louisiana

Head coach

- Jerrod Calhoun (Cincinnati)

Assistant coach(es)

- Ethan Faulkner (Northern Kentucky)
- Ben Asher (West Virginia)
- Mantoris Robinson (Winthrop)

Legend

- (C) Team captain
- (S) Suspended
- (I) Ineligible
- (W) Walk-on
- Injured
- Current redshirt

Roster
Last update: November 15, 2023

== Schedule and results ==
Date time, TV	Rank^{#}	Opponent^{#}	Result	Record	Site (attendance) city, state
Regular season
November 6, 2023*; 8:30 pm, ESPN+		at Louisiana	L 62–72	0–1	Cajundome (2,078); Lafayette, LA
November 10, 2023*; 6:30 pm, ESPN+		at Michigan	L 62–92	0–2	Crisler Center (11,380); Ann Arbor, MI
November 13, 2023*; 6:30 pm, ESPN+		Ohio Christian	W 99–71	1–2	Beeghly Center (1,474); Youngstown, OH
November 17, 2023*; 6:30 pm, ESPN+		Utah Tech	W 75–68	2–2	Beeghly Center (1,631); Youngstown, OH
November 19, 2023*; 3:00 pm, ESPN+		Lake Erie	W 79–57	3–2	Beeghly Center (1,430); Youngstown, OH
November 24, 2023*; 7:00 pm, ESPN+		at Dayton	L 69–77	3–3	UD Arena (13,407); Dayton, OH
November 29, 2023; 6:30 pm, ESPN+		Cleveland State	W 94–69	4–3 (1–0)	Beeghly Center (2,196); Youngstown, OH
December 2, 2023; 2:00 pm, ESPN+		at Robert Morris	W 71–57	5–3 (2–0)	UPMC Events Center (1,229); Moon Township, PA
December 6, 2023*; 7:00 pm, ESPN+		at Ohio	W 78–72	6–3	Convocation Center (3,799); Athens, OH
December 9, 2023*; 1:00 pm, ESPN+		at Western Michigan	W 72–68	7–3	University Arena (1,598); Kalamazoo, MI
December 14, 2023*; 6:30 pm, ESPN+		Bethany	W 107–70	8–3	Beeghly Center (1,788); Youngstown, OH
December 18, 2023*; 6:30 pm, ESPN+		Westminster	W 117–45	9–3	Beeghly Center (2,078); Youngstown, OH
December 21, 2023*; 2:00 pm, ESPN+		Navy	W 75–65	10–3	Beeghly Center (2,463); Youngstown, OH
December 31, 2023; 2:30 pm, ESPN+		Oakland	L 81–88	10–4 (2–1)	Beeghly Center (2,456); Youngstown, OH
January 4, 2024; 7:00 pm, ESPN+		at Northern Kentucky	L 76–79	10–5 (2–2)	Truist Arena (3,105); Highland Heights, KY
January 7, 2024; 1:30 pm, ESPN+		IUPUI	W 75–65	11–5 (3–2)	Beeghly Center (1,649); Youngstown, OH
January 10, 2024; 6:30 pm, ESPN+		Purdue Fort Wayne	W 93–85	12–5 (4–2)	Beeghly Center (2,294); Youngstown, OH
January 12, 2024; 6:30 pm, ESPN2/ESPN+		Wright State	W 81–71	13–5 (5–2)	Beeghly Center (2,672); Youngstown, OH
January 17, 2024; 7:00 pm, ESPN+		at Oakland	L 67–70	13–6 (5–3)	OU Credit Union O'rena (2,471); Rochester, MI
January 20, 2024; 4:00 pm, ESPN+		at Detroit Mercy	W 105–64	14–6 (6–3)	Calihan Hall (881); Detroit, MI
January 25, 2024; 7:00 pm, ESPN+		at IUPUI	W 78–50	15–6 (7–3)	Indiana Farmers Coliseum (708); Indianapolis, IN
January 28, 2024; 1:30 pm, ESPN+		Northern Kentucky	W 82–52	16–6 (8–3)	Beeghly Center (6,001); Youngstown, OH
February 1, 2024; 7:00 pm, ESPNU/ESPN+		at Wright State	W 88–77	17–6 (9–3)	Nutter Center (3,588); Fairborn, OH
February 4, 2024; 2:00 pm, ESPN+		at Purdue Fort Wayne	L 78–82	17–7 (9–4)	Hilliard Gates Sports Center (1,103); Fort Wayne, IN
February 8, 2024; 6:30 pm, ESPN+		Milwaukee	W 97–85 ^{OT}	18–7 (10–4)	Beeghly Center (3,046); Youngstown, OH
February 10, 2024; 1:30 pm, ESPN+		Green Bay	L 83–84	18–8 (10–5)	Beeghly Center (3,229); Youngstown, OH
February 14, 2024; 6:30 pm, ESPN+		Robert Morris	W 87–77	19–8 (11–5)	Beeghly Center (2,261); Youngstown, OH
February 17, 2024; 3:00 pm, ESPN+		at Cleveland State	L 73–81	19–9 (11–6)	Wolstein Center (2,397); Cleveland, OH
February 23, 2024; 8:00 pm, ESPN+		at Milwaukee	W 84–80 ^{OT}	20–9 (12–6)	UW–Milwaukee Panther Arena (2,296); Milwaukee, WI
February 25, 2024; 3:00 pm, ESPN+		at Green Bay	W 71–59	21–9 (13–6)	Kress Events Center (3,202); Green Bay, WI
February 28, 2024; 6:30 pm, ESPN+		Detroit Mercy	W 69–55	22–9 (14–6)	Beeghly Center (3,413); Youngstown, OH
Horizon League tournament
March 7, 2024; 7:00 pm, ESPN+	(2)	(7) Cleveland State; Quarterfinals	L 70–82	22–10	Beeghly Center (3,102); Youngstown, OH
*Non-conference game. ^{#}Rankings from AP Poll. (#) Tournament seedings in parentheses. All times are in Eastern.
