= 2023–24 Cleveland State Vikings men's basketball team =

American college basketball season

2023–24 Cleveland State Vikings men's basketball

CBI, Quarterfinals
- Conference: Horizon League
- Record: 21–15 (11–9 Horizon)
- Head coach: Daniyal Robinson (2nd season)
- Assistant coaches: Kwanza Johnson (1st season); Travis Lewis (3rd season); Jay Shunnar (2nd season)

2023–24 Horizon League men's basketball standings
	Conf.				Overall
Team	W		L	PCT	W		L	PCT
Oakland †	15	–	5	.750	24	–	12	.667
Youngstown State	14	–	6	.700	22	–	10	.688
Green Bay	13	–	7	.650	18	–	14	.563
Wright State	13	–	7	.650	18	–	14	.563
Northern Kentucky	12	–	8	.600	18	–	15	.545
Milwaukee	12	–	8	.600	20	–	15	.571
Cleveland State	11	–	9	.550	21	–	15	.583
Purdue Fort Wayne	11	–	9	.550	23	–	13	.639
Robert Morris	6	–	14	.300	10	–	22	.313
IUPUI	2	–	18	.100	6	–	26	.188
Detroit Mercy	1	–	19	.050	1	–	31	.031
† 2024 Horizon League tournament winner

The 2023–24 Cleveland State Vikings men's basketball team represented Cleveland State University during the 2023–24 NCAA Division I men's basketball season. The Vikings, led by second-year head coach Daniyal Robinson, played their home games at the Wolstein Center as members of the Horizon League. They finished the season 18–13, 11–9 in Horizon League play to tie for seventh place. As the No. 7 seed in the Horizon League tournament, they defeated IUPUI and Youngstown State before losing to Oakland in the semifinals. The Vikings received an automatic bid to the College Basketball Invitational (CBI), defeating Northern Colorado in the first round before falling to High Point in the quarterfinals, bringing their overall record to 21–15.

== Previous season ==
The Vikings finished the 2022–23 season 21–14, 14–6 in Horizon League play to finish in three-way tie for second place. In the Horizon League tournament, they defeated Robert Morris in the quarterfinals and Milwaukee in the semifinals before falling to Northern Kentucky in the championship game. They received an invitation to the CBI, where they lost to Eastern Kentucky in the first round.

== Roster ==
2023–24 Cleveland State Vikings men's basketball team
Players
Coaches

Pos.	#	Name	Height	Weight	Year	Previous school	Hometown
G	0	Tevin Smith	6 ft 4 in (1.93 m)	190 lb (86 kg)	Jr	Denver	Danville, Illinois
G	1	Tae Williams	6 ft 7 in (2.01 m)	205 lb (93 kg)	Sr	John A. Logan College	Chicago, Illinois
G	2	Jalin Rice	6 ft 1 in (1.85 m)	175 lb (79 kg)	Jr	Northeast Mississippi CC	Jackson, Mississippi
G	3	Drew Lowder	6 ft 0 in (1.83 m)	175 lb (79 kg)	Sr	Lansing CC	Jackson, Michigan
C	4	Dok Muordar	6 ft 11 in (2.11 m)	205 lb (93 kg)	So	South Florida	Rumbek, South Sudan
G	5	Danny Young	6 ft 1 in (1.85 m)	175 lb (79 kg)	Fr	Shaker Heights HS	Shaker Heights, Ohio
G	8	TJ Moss	6 ft 4 in (1.93 m)	180 lb (82 kg)	Sr	Detroit Mercy	Memphis, Tennessee
F	11	Jayson Woodrich	6 ft 7 in (2.01 m)	195 lb (88 kg)	Jr	Scotland Campus	Beachwood, Ohio
F	12	Dylan Arnett	6 ft 9 in (2.06 m)	230 lb (104 kg)	So	DePaul College Prep	Chicago, Illinois
F	13	Tristan Enaruna	6 ft 8 in (2.03 m)	220 lb (100 kg)	Sr	Iowa State	Almere, Netherlands
G	15	Paxton Payne	6 ft 2 in (1.88 m)	190 lb (86 kg)	RS So	Kansas City	Cookeville, Tennessee
G	20	Ramar Pryor	6 ft 3 in (1.91 m)	190 lb (86 kg)	So	St. Vincent–St. Mary HS	Canton, Ohio
G	22	Chase Robinson	6 ft 1 in (1.85 m)	205 lb (93 kg)	Jr	Illinois–Springfield	Matteson, Illinois
F	32	KJ Debrick	6 ft 9 in (2.06 m)	240 lb (109 kg)	Jr	John A. Logan College	Springfield, Illinois

Head coach

- Daniyal Robinson (Little Rock)

Assistant coach(es)

- Kwanza Johnson (Tulsa)
- Travis Lewis (Eastern Michigan)
- Jay Shunnar (Michigan)

Legend

- (C) Team captain
- (S) Suspended
- (I) Ineligible
- (W) Walk-on
- Injured
- Current redshirt

Roster
Last update: November 14, 2023

== Schedule and results ==
Date time, TV	Rank^{#}	Opponent^{#}	Result	Record	High points	High rebounds	High assists	Site (attendance) city, state
Exhibition
November 2, 2023*; 7:00 pm		Baldwin Wallace	W 96–48	–	–	–	–	Wolstein Center; Cleveland, OH
Regular season
November 6, 2023*; 7:00 pm, ESPN+		at Duquesne	L 77–79	0–1	27 – Lowder	11 – Williams	4 – Lowder	UPMC Cooper Fieldhouse (2,364); Pittsburgh, PA
November 8, 2023*; 7:00 pm, ESPN+		Defiance	W 102–41	1–1	14 – Pryor	7 – Arnett	4 – Smith	Wolstein Center (1,593); Cleveland, OH
November 11, 2023*; 6:00 pm, ESPN+		Ohio	W 82–78	2–1	22 – Enaruna	6 – Tied	6 – Enaruna	Wolstein Center (2,399); Cleveland, OH
November 15, 2023*; 7:00 pm, ESPN+		Canisius	W 71–61	3–1	19 – Enaruna	10 – Enaruna	3 – Tied	Wolstein Center (1,732); Cleveland, OH
November 18, 2023*; 1:00 pm, ESPN+		at Eastern Michigan	L 62–69	3–2	17 – Enaruna	9 – Enaruna	3 – Lowder	George Gervin GameAbove Center (1,730); Ypsilanti, MI
November 22, 2023*; 7:00 pm, ESPN+		East Tennessee State; Viking Invitational	W 72–70	4–2	28 – Enaruna	7 – Enaruna	3 – Tied	Woodling Gym (1,412); Cleveland, OH
November 25, 2023*; 7:00 pm, ESPN+		Alabama A&M; Viking Invitational	W 86–59	5–2	18 – Tied	7 – Tied	4 – Tied	Woodling Gym (1,466); Cleveland, OH
November 29, 2023; 6:30 pm, ESPN+		at Youngstown State	L 69–94	5–3 (0–1)	17 – Lowder	5 – Arnett	4 – Enaruna	Beeghly Center (2,196); Youngstown, OH
December 2, 2023; 3:00 pm, ESPN+		Detroit Mercy	W 69–58	6–3 (1–1)	15 – Enaruna	11 – Enaruna	3 – Enaruna	Wolstein Center (1,395); Cleveland, OH
December 5, 2023*; 10:00 pm, ESPN+		at Saint Mary's	L 57–70	6–4	19 – Lowder	7 – Williams	4 – Lowder	University Credit Union Pavilion (2,964); Moraga, CA
December 9, 2023*; 2:00 pm, ESPN+		at Kent State	L 77–83	6–5	22 – Enaruna	6 – Williams	3 – Arnett	MAC Center (3,124); Kent, OH
December 15, 2023*; 8:00 pm, ESPN+		at Bradley	W 76–69	7–5	26 – Lowder	9 – Arnett	3 – Williams	Carver Arena (4,842); Peoria, IL
December 21, 2023*; 6:00 pm, ESPN+		Western Michigan	W 90–77	8–5	32 – Enaruna	10 – Enaruna	4 – Enaruna	Wolstein Center (1,473); Cleveland, OH
December 28, 2023; 7:00 pm, ESPN+		Oakland	W 75–67	9–5 (2–1)	15 – Lowder	8 – Williams	4 – Tied	Wolstein Center (1,397); Cleveland, OH
December 31, 2023; 2:00 pm, ESPN+		at IUPUI	W 86–77	10–5 (3–1)	23 – Woodrich	6 – Arnett	4 – Tied	Indiana Farmers Coliseum (816); Indianapolis, IN
January 4, 2024; 7:00 pm, ESPN2/ESPN+		at Wright State	L 70–82	10–6 (3–2)	15 – Tied	7 – Williams	2 – Tied	Nutter Center (3,572); Fairborn, OH
January 7, 2024; 4:00 pm, ESPN+		Northern Kentucky	W 88–85 ^{OT}	11–6 (4–2)	24 – Enaruna	12 – Enaruna	5 – Enaruna	Wolstein Center (1,548); Cleveland, OH
January 12, 2024; 8:00 pm, ESPN+		at Milwaukee	L 80–88	11–7 (4–3)	20 – Tied	9 – Enaruna	5 – Enaruna	UW–Milwaukee Panther Arena (1,431); Milwaukee, WI
January 14, 2024; 3:00 pm, ESPN+		at Green Bay	L 71–79	11–8 (4–4)	22 – Enaruna	6 – Enaruna	5 – Lowder	Resch Center (1,463); Ashwaubenon, WI
January 20, 2024; 2:00 pm, ESPN+		Purdue Fort Wayne	W 75–68	12–8 (5–4)	23 – Lowder	8 – Williams	8 – Enaruna	Wolstein Center (1,738); Cleveland, OH
January 25, 2024; 7:00 pm, ESPN+		Wright State	L 99–107 ^{OT}	12–9 (5–5)	28 – Enaruna	9 – Williams	3 – Lowder	Wolstein Center (1,864); Cleveland, OH
January 28, 2024; 1:00 pm, ESPN+		Robert Morris	W 66–64	13–9 (6–5)	28 – Enaruna	5 – Williams	4 – Lowder	Wolstein Center (1,476); Cleveland, OH
February 1, 2024; 7:00 pm, ESPN+		at Detroit Mercy	W 77–65	14–9 (7–5)	27 – Enaruna	7 – Tied	3 – Lowder	Calihan Hall (420); Detroit, MI
February 3, 2024; 1:00 pm, ESPN+		at Oakland	L 71–83	14–10 (7–6)	23 – Enaruna	12 – Arnett	6 – Lowder	OU Credit Union O'rena (2,931); Auburn Hills, MI
February 7, 2024; 7:00 pm, ESPN+		at Purdue Fort Wayne	W 75–72	15–10 (8–6)	24 – Enaruna	5 – Tied	4 – Enaruna	Memorial Coliseum (898); Fort Wayne, IN
February 14, 2024; 7:00 pm, ESPN+		Milwaukee	L 68–71	15–11 (8–7)	20 – Enaruna	8 – Enaruna	4 – Robinson	Wolstein Center (1,281); Cleveland, OH
February 17, 2024; 3:00 pm, ESPN+		Youngstown State	W 81–73	16–11 (9–7)	31 – Enaruna	8 – Enaruna	5 – Lowder	Wolstein Center (2,397); Cleveland, OH
February 22, 2024; 7:00 pm, ESPN+		at Northern Kentucky	L 73–75	16–12 (9–8)	25 – Enaruna	10 – Williams	4 – Lowder	Truist Arena (2,856); Highland Heights, KY
February 25, 2024; 2:00 pm, ESPN+		at Robert Morris	W 73–71	17–12 (10–8)	24 – Enaruna	12 – Enaruna	4 – Tied	UPMC Events Center (1,555); Moon Township, PA
February 28, 2024; 7:00 pm, ESPN+		Green Bay	L 61–69	17–13 (10–9)	24 – Enaruna	6 – Tied	3 – Tied	Wolstein Center (1,752); Cleveland, OH
March 2, 2024; 6:00 pm, ESPN+		IUPUI	W 75–66	18–13 (11–9)	20 – Enaruna	7 – Williams	3 – Tied	Wolstein Center (2,129); Cleveland, OH
Horizon League tournament
March 5, 2024; 7:00 pm, ESPN+	(7)	(10) IUPUI; First round	W 85–66	19–13	18 – Woodrich	6 – Arnett	2 – Tied	Wolstein Center (1,333); Cleveland, OH
March 7, 2024; 7:00 pm, ESPN+	(7)	at (2) Youngstown State; Quarterfinals	W 82–70	20–13	20 – Robinson	12 – Arnett	4 – Robinson	Beeghly Center (3,102); Youngstown, OH
March 11, 2024; 7:00 pm, ESPNU	(7)	vs. (1) Oakland; Semifinals	L 71–74	20–14	21 – Williams	14 – Williams	4 – Lowder	Indiana Farmers Coliseum; Indianapolis, IN
CBI
March 24, 2024; 11:00 am, FloHoops	(9)	vs. (8) Northern Colorado; First round	W 51–49	21–14	22 – Enaruna	10 – Enaruna	3 – Lowder	Ocean Center; Daytona Beach, FL
March 25, 2024; 12:00 pm, FloHoops	(9)	vs. (1) High Point; Quarterfinals	L 74–93	21–15	17 – Lowder	6 – Williams	4 – Lowder	Ocean Center; Daytona Beach, FL
*Non-conference game. ^{#}Rankings from AP Poll. (#) Tournament seedings in parentheses. All times are in Eastern.
