= 2023–24 Purdue Fort Wayne Mastodons men's basketball team =

American college basketball season

2023–24 Purdue Fort Wayne Mastodons men's basketball

Arizona Tip-Off (Desert Division) champions

CIT, runner-up
- Conference: Horizon League
- Record: 23–13 (11–9 Horizon)
- Head coach: Jon Coffman (10th season)
- Assistant coaches: Ryan Sims (14th season); Adam Blaylock (6th season); Mike Wolf (5th season); Pat Lepper (3rd season)
- Home arena: Hilliard Gates Sports Center

2023–24 Horizon League men's basketball standings
	Conf.				Overall
Team	W		L	PCT	W		L	PCT
Oakland †	15	–	5	.750	24	–	12	.667
Youngstown State	14	–	6	.700	22	–	10	.688
Green Bay	13	–	7	.650	18	–	14	.563
Wright State	13	–	7	.650	18	–	14	.563
Northern Kentucky	12	–	8	.600	18	–	15	.545
Milwaukee	12	–	8	.600	20	–	15	.571
Cleveland State	11	–	9	.550	21	–	15	.583
Purdue Fort Wayne	11	–	9	.550	23	–	13	.639
Robert Morris	6	–	14	.300	10	–	22	.313
IUPUI	2	–	18	.100	6	–	26	.188
Detroit Mercy	1	–	19	.050	1	–	31	.031
† 2024 Horizon League tournament winner

The 2023–24 Purdue Fort Wayne Mastodons men's basketball team represented Purdue University Fort Wayne in the 2023–24 NCAA Division I men's basketball season. The Mastodons, led by tenth-year head coach Jon Coffman, played their home games at the Hilliard Gates Sports Center in Fort Wayne, Indiana, as members of the Horizon League. They finished the season 23–13, and 11–9 in Horizon League play to tie with Cleveland State for seventh place.

== Previous season ==
The Mastodons finished the 2020–21 season 17–15, 9–11 in Horizon League play, to finish tied for eighth place. They went to lose in the first round of the Horizon League tournament to Detroit Mercy.

== Offseason ==
=== Departures ===
Purdue Fort Wayne departures
Name	Number	Pos.	Height	Weight	Year	Hometown	Reason for departure
Bobby Planutis	0	F	6' 8"	205	Graduate student	Hazleton, PA	Graduated
Jarred Godfrey	1	G	6' 5"	190	Graduate student	Atlanta, GA	Graduated
Damian Chong Qui	2	G	5' 8"	155	Graduate student	Baltimore, MD	Graduated
Ra Kpedi	3	F	6' 9"	245	Graduate student	Indianapolis, IN	Graduated
Dow Dunton	25	F	6' 7"	210	Graduate student	Wake Forest, NC	Graduated
Deonte Billups	15	G	6' 4"	200	Senior	Moline, IL	Graduated
Redford Dunton	14	F	6' 7"	195	RS freshman	Raleigh, NC	Transferred to Mount Olive
JoJo Peterson	10	G	6' 5"	185	Sophomore	Johns Creek, GA	Transferred to North Georgia

=== Incoming transfers ===
Purdue Fort Wayne incoming transfers
Name	Number	Pos.	Height	Weight	Year	Hometown	Previous school
Jalen Jackson	1	G	6' 2"	200	Sophomore	Fort Wayne, IN	UIC
Rasheed Bello	0	G	6' 0"	185	Junior	Chicago, IL	UW–Parkside
Maximus Nelson	11	F	6' 8"	215	Sophomore	Appleton, WI	Valparaiso
Destin Whitaker	2	G	6' 5"	180	Senior	Romeoville, IL	Fresno State

== Roster ==
2023–24 Purdue Fort Wayne Mastodons men's basketball team
Players
Coaches

Pos.	#	Name	Height	Weight	Year	Previous school	Hometown
G	0	Rasheed Bello	6 ft 0 in (1.83 m)	185 lb (84 kg)	Jr	UW–Parkside	Chicago, IL
G	1	Jalen Jackson	6 ft 2 in (1.88 m)	200 lb (91 kg)	So	UIC	Fort Wayne, IN
G	2	Destin Whitaker	6 ft 5 in (1.96 m)	180 lb (82 kg)	Sr	Fresno State	Romeoville, IL
G	3	Quinton Morton-Robertson	5 ft 8 in (1.73 m)	155 lb (70 kg)	RS Sr	Radford	Radford, VA
G	4	Chris Morgan	6 ft 2 in (1.88 m)	190 lb (86 kg)	RS Fr	Kaukauna	Kaukauna, WI
F	5	Johnathan Dejurnett	6 ft 8 in (2.03 m)	225 lb (102 kg)	Sr	Lausanne Collegiate	Memphis, TN
G	10	Corey II Hadnot	6 ft 3 in (1.91 m)	175 lb (79 kg)	Fr	Cypress Creek	Atlanta, GA
F	11	Maximus Nelson	6 ft 8 in (2.03 m)	215 lb (98 kg)	So	Valparaiso	Appleton, WI
F	12	Jermaine Coleman	6 ft 7 in (2.01 m)	190 lb (86 kg)	Fr	Park Tudor	Indianapolis, IN
F	13	Deangelo Elisee	6 ft 9 in (2.06 m)	260 lb (118 kg)	RS Jr	Triton	Nassau, Bahamas
G	21	Khoi Thurmon	6 ft 1 in (1.85 m)	205 lb (93 kg)	Fr	Buchtel	Chicago, IL
G	22	Anthony Roberts	6 ft 4 in (1.93 m)	220 lb (100 kg)	GS	St. Cloud State	Oak Park, IL
G	23	Keyon Miller	6 ft 2 in (1.88 m)	160 lb (73 kg)	Fr	Southport	Indianapolis, IN
G	24	Keaton Dukes	6 ft 3 in (1.91 m)	170 lb (77 kg)	So	Wawasee	Syracuse, IN
G	32	Eric Mulder	6 ft 8 in (2.03 m)	225 lb (102 kg)	So	Pella Christian	Oskaloosa, IA

Head coach

- Jon Coffman (Washington and Lee)

Assistant coach(es)

- Ryan Sims (Indianapolis)
- Mike Wolf (William Peace)
- Adam Blaylock (Peru State)
- Pat Lepper (IPFW)

Legend

- (C) Team captain
- (S) Suspended
- (I) Ineligible
- (W) Walk-on
- Injured
- Current redshirt

Roster
Last update: August 30, 2023

== Schedule and results ==
Date time, TV	Rank^{#}	Opponent^{#}	Result	Record	High points	High rebounds	High assists	Site (attendance) city, state
Regular season
November 7, 2023*; 9:00 p.m., FS2		at DePaul	W 82–74	1–0	24 – Morton-Robertson	8 – Jackson	3 – 3 tied	Wintrust Arena (931); Chicago, IL
November 9, 2023*; 7:00 p.m., ESPN+		Andrews (MI)	W 130–34	2–0	21 – Jackson	9 – Nelson	9 – Morton-Robertson	War Memorial Coliseum (1,604); Fort Wayne, IN
November 12, 2023*; 2:00 p.m., ESPN+		Texas A&M–Commerce	W 86–64	3–0	29 – Bello	10 – Roberts	4 – Bello	War Memorial Coliseum (1,886); Fort Wayne, IN
November 17, 2023*; 4:30 p.m.		vs. Northern Arizona; Arizona Tip-Off (Desert Division) first round	W 77–67	4–0	27 – Morton-Robertson	10 – Roberts	4 – Bello	Desert Diamond Arena (1,028); Phoenix, AZ
November 18, 2023*; 4:30 p.m.		vs. South Dakota; Arizona Tip-Off (Desert Division) championship game	W 93–81	5–0	19 – Jackson	8 – Mulder	9 – Bello	Desert Diamond Arena (1,211); Phoenix, AZ
November 22, 2023*; 9:00 p.m., ESPN+		at San Francisco; Arizona Tip-Off campus-site game	L 60–76	5–1	16 – Roberts	7 – Roberts	5 – Jackson	War Memorial Gymnasium; San Francisco, CA
November 25, 2023*; 7:00 p.m., ESPN+		Wittenberg	W 95–65	6–1	16 – Bello	7 – Mulder	4 – Bello	Gates Sports Center (816); Fort Wayne, IN
November 29, 2023; 7:00 p.m., ESPN+		Green Bay	W 75–71	7–1 (1–0)	19 – Jackson	11 – Mulder	4 – Bello	War Memorial Coliseum (1,807); Fort Wayne, IN
December 2, 2023; 3:00 p.m., ESPN+		at Oakland	W 98–77	8–1 (2–0)	20 – Roberts	8 – Mulder	6 – Bello	Athletics Center O'rena (1,000); Rochester, MI
December 6, 2023*; 8:00 p.m., ESPN+		at Southern Indiana	W 70–57	9–1	19 – Roberts	7 – 3 tied	3 – Roberts	Screaming Eagles Arena (1,455); Evansville, IN
December 9, 2023*; 7:00 p.m., ESPN+		Southeast Missouri	W 89–80	10–1	19 – Bello	6 – Roberts	5 – Bello	War Memorial Coliseum (1,838); Fort Wayne, IN
December 16, 2023*; 7:00 p.m., ESPN+		Bethune–Cookman	W 86–63	11–1	17 – Jackson	8 – Mulder	5 – Roberts	Gates Sports Center (1,089); Fort Wayne, IN
December 20, 2023*; 7:00 p.m., ACC Network		at Pittsburgh	L 48–62	11–2	11 – Bello	8 – 2 tied	4 – Bello	Petersen Events Center (7,641); Pittsburgh, PA
December 29, 2023; 7:00 p.m., ESPN+		Northern Kentucky	W 73–60	12–2 (3–0)	17 – Jackson	9 – Roberts	8 – Bello	Gates Sports Center (1,107); Fort Wayne, IN
December 31, 2023; 2:00 p.m., ESPN+		Detroit Mercy	W 91–56	13–2 (4–0)	19 – Mulder	10 – Mulder	5 – Jackson	Gates Sports Center (1,067); Fort Wayne, IN
January 6, 2024; 1:00 p.m., ESPN+		Wright State	L 98–106	13–3 (4–1)	26 – Morton-Robertson	6 – Mulder	3 – Bello	Gates Sports Center (1,237); Fort Wayne, IN
January 10, 2024; 6:30 p.m., ESPN+		at Youngstown State	L 85–93	13–4 (4–2)	25 – Bello	9 – Roberts	5 – Roberts	Beeghly Center (2,294); Youngstown, OH
January 12, 2024; 7:00 p.m., ESPN+		at Robert Morris	L 88–91	13–5 (4–3)	17 – Jackson	9 – 2 tied	6 – Bello	UPMC Events Center (972); Moon Township, PA
January 17, 2024; 7:00 p.m., ESPN+		IUPUI	L 79–85	13–6 (4–4)	22 – Jackson	12 – Mulder	4 – 2 tied	War Memorial Coliseum (1,164); Fort Wayne, IN
January 20, 2024; 2:00 p.m., ESPN+		at Cleveland State	L 68–75	13–7 (4–5)	20 – Bello	6 – 2 tied	6 – Bello	Wolstein Center (1,738); Cleveland, OH
January 25, 2024; 7:00 p.m., ESPN+		at Northern Kentucky	W 63–58	14–7 (5–5)	17 – Jackson	9 – Jackson	3 – 2 tied	Truist Arena (3,079); Highland Heights, KY
February 1, 2024; 7:00 p.m., ESPN+		Milwaukee	L 65–68	14–8 (5–6)	17 – Jackson	8 – Mulder	6 – Bello	War Memorial Coliseum (903); Fort Wayne, IN
February 4, 2024; 2:00 p.m., ESPN+		Youngstown State	W 82–78	15–8 (6–6)	23 – Jackson	6 – Morton-Robertson	5 – Bello	Gates Sports Center (1,103); Fort Wayne, IN
February 7, 2024; 7:00 p.m., ESPN+		Cleveland State	L 72–75	15–9 (6–7)	22 – Bello	7 – Jackson	3 – Jackson	War Memorial Coliseum (898); Fort Wayne, IN
February 10, 2024; 12:00 p.m., ESPN+		at IUPUI	W 92–65	16–9 (7–7)	24 – Jackson	6 – Roberts	8 – Morton-Robertson	Indiana Farmers Coliseum; Indianapolis, IN
February 14, 2024; 7:00 p.m., ESPN+		Oakland	L 63–71	16–10 (7–8)	15 – Bello	9 – Mulder	4 – Jackson	War Memorial Coliseum (1,604); Fort Wayne, IN
February 17, 2024; 1:00 p.m., ESPN+		at Detroit Mercy	W 83–69	17–10 (8–8)	24 – Morton-Robertson	6 – 2 tied	6 – Jackson	Calihan Hall (1,213); Detroit, MI
February 23, 2024; 7:00 p.m., ESPN+		at Green Bay	W 85–59	18–10 (9–8)	31 – Roberts	9 – 2 tied	4 – 2 tied	Kress Events Center (3,301); Green Bay, WI
February 25, 2024; 3:00 p.m., ESPN+		at Milwaukee	L 88–96	18–11 (9–9)	21 – Bello	8 – Mulder	7 – Jackson	UW–Milwaukee Panther Arena (2,194); Milwaukee, WI
February 28, 2024; 7:00 p.m., ESPN+		at Wright State	W 79–77 ^{OT}	19–11 (10–9)	27 – Jackson	13 – Mulder	6 – Bello	Nutter Center (3,531); Dayton, OH
March 2, 2024; 7:00 p.m., ESPN+		Robert Morris	W 83–65	20–11 (11–9)	18 – Roberts	7 – 2 tied	4 – 2 tied	Gates Sports Center (992); Fort Wayne, IN
Horizon League tournament
March 5, 2024; 7:00 p.m., ESPN+	(8)	(9) Robert Morris; First round	W 78–63	21–11	17 – Morton-Robertson	13 – Mulder	5 – Morton-Robertson	War Memorial Coliseum (959); Fort Wayne, IN
March 7, 2024; 7:00 p.m., ESPN+	(8)	at (1) Oakland; Quarterfinals	L 65–75	21–12	16 – Bello	8 – Mulder	5 – Bello	Athletics Center O'rena (3,721); Rochester, MI
CIT
March 20, 2024; 7:00 p.m., ESPN+		at Bowling Green; Jim Phelan Classic – first round	W 77–75	22–12	18 – Jackson	8 – Mulder	5 – Bello	Stroh Center (1,219); Bowling Green, OH
March 25, 2024; 7:00 p.m., ESPN+		at Tarleton State; Semifinals	W 73–72	23–12	21 – Bello	15 – Mulder	4 – Jackson	Wisdom Gym (1,686); Stephenville, TX
March 27, 2024; 7:00 p.m., ESPN+		at Norfolk State; Championship	L 67–75	23–13	18 – Roberts	8 – Roberts	8 – Bello	Joseph G. Echols Memorial Hall (1,576); Norfolk, VA
*Non-conference game. ^{#}Rankings from AP poll. (#) Tournament seedings in parentheses. All times are in Eastern.
