= 2023–24 Oakland Golden Grizzlies men's basketball team =

American college basketball season

2023–24 Oakland Golden Grizzlies men's basketball

Horizon League regular season and tournament champions

NCAA tournament, Second Round
- Conference: Horizon League
- Record: 24–12 (15–5 Horizon)
- Head coach: Greg Kampe (40th season)
- Associate head coach: Jeff Smith
- Assistant coaches: Mychal Covington; Bobby Naubert
- Home arena: OU Credit Union O'rena

2023–24 Horizon League men's basketball standings
	Conf.				Overall
Team	W		L	PCT	W		L	PCT
Oakland †	15	–	5	.750	24	–	12	.667
Youngstown State	14	–	6	.700	22	–	10	.688
Green Bay	13	–	7	.650	18	–	14	.563
Wright State	13	–	7	.650	18	–	14	.563
Northern Kentucky	12	–	8	.600	18	–	15	.545
Milwaukee	12	–	8	.600	20	–	15	.571
Cleveland State	11	–	9	.550	21	–	15	.583
Purdue Fort Wayne	11	–	9	.550	23	–	13	.639
Robert Morris	6	–	14	.300	10	–	22	.313
IUPUI	2	–	18	.100	6	–	26	.188
Detroit Mercy	1	–	19	.050	1	–	31	.031
† 2024 Horizon League tournament winner

The 2023–24 Oakland Golden Grizzlies men's basketball team represented Oakland University in the 2023–24 NCAA Division I men's basketball season. The Golden Grizzlies, led by 40th-year head coach Greg Kampe, played their home games at the OU Credit Union O'rena in Auburn Hills, Michigan (with a Rochester mailing address) as members of the Horizon League.

== Previous season ==
The Golden Grizzlies finished the 2022–23 season 13–18, 11–9 in Horizon League play, to finish in fifth place. They were defeated by eventual tournament champions Northern Kentucky in the quarterfinal round of the Horizon League tournament.

== Roster ==
2023–24 Oakland Golden Grizzlies men's basketball team
Players
Coaches

Pos.	#	Name	Height	Weight	Year	Hometown
G	0	Rocket Watts	6 ft 2 in (1.88 m)	182 lb (83 kg)	Sr	Detroit, MI
G	1	Michael Rogers	6 ft 0 in (1.83 m)	228 lb (103 kg)	Jr	Harlem, NY
F	2	Chris Conway	6 ft 9 in (2.06 m)	221 lb (100 kg)	Jr	Naperville, IL
G	3	Jack Gohlke	6 ft 3 in (1.91 m)	215 lb (98 kg)	GS	Pewaukee, WI
F	4	Trey Townsend	6 ft 6 in (1.98 m)	228 lb (103 kg)	Jr	Oxford, MI
G	5	Evan Solomon	6 ft 2 in (1.88 m)	185 lb (84 kg)	RS Fr	Charlevoix, MI
G/F	7	Isaiah Jones	6 ft 7 in (2.01 m)	213 lb (97 kg)	So	Nashville, TN
G	10	DQ Cole	6 ft 3 in (1.91 m)	189 lb (86 kg)	Jr	Pontiac, MI
G	11	Blake Lampman	6 ft 3 in (1.91 m)	184 lb (83 kg)	GS	Haslett, MI
F	12	Tuburu Naivalurua	6 ft 6 in (1.98 m)	218 lb (99 kg)	Jr	Sydney, Australia
G	13	Osei Price	6 ft 4 in (1.93 m)	188 lb (85 kg)	Jr	Upper Marlboro, MD
F	15	Aundre Polk	6 ft 9 in (2.06 m)	200 lb (91 kg)	Jr	Detroit, MI
G	21	Tone Hunter	5 ft 11 in (1.8 m)	148 lb (67 kg)	Jr	Las Vegas, NV
F	24	Zavier Banks	6 ft 5 in (1.96 m)	195 lb (88 kg)	Fr	Pleasant Ridge, MI
F	25	Cooper Craggs	6 ft 5 in (1.96 m)	222 lb (101 kg)	RS Fr	Northville, MI

Head coach

- Greg Kampe (Bowling Green)

Assistant coach(es)

- Jeff Smith (Southeast Missouri State)
- Mychal Covington (Oakland)
- Bobby Naubert (Madonna)

Legend

- (C) Team captain
- (S) Suspended
- (I) Ineligible
- (W) Walk-on
- Injured
- Current redshirt

Roster
Last update: November 15, 2023

== Schedule and results ==
Date time, TV	Rank^{#}	Opponent^{#}	Result	Record	Site (attendance) city, state
Exhibition
October 19, 2023*; 7:00 pm, −		Walsh	L 69–75	–	OU Credit Union O'rena (1,587); Auburn Hills, MI
October 30, 2023*; 5:30 pm, −		Wayne State (MI)	W 86–71	–	OU Credit Union O'rena (1,749); Auburn Hills, MI
Regular season
November 6, 2023*; 7:00 pm, B1G		at Ohio State	L 73–79	0–1	Value City Arena (9,244); Columbus, OH
November 10, 2023*; 8:00 pm, ESPN+		at No. 25 Illinois	L 53–64	0–2	State Farm Center (15,544); Champaign, IL
November 14, 2023*; 7:00 pm, ESPN+		Bowling Green	W 81–62	1–2	OU Credit Union O'rena (2,384); Auburn Hills, MI
November 19, 2023*; 11:00 am, FloHoops		vs. Drake; Cayman Islands Classic quarterfinals	L 77–85	1–3	John Gray Gymnasium; George Town, Cayman Islands
November 20, 2023*; 11:00 am, FloHoops		vs. Loyola Marymount; Cayman Islands Classic consolation 2nd round	W 74–69	2–3	John Gray Gymnasium; George Town, Cayman Islands
November 21, 2023*; 1:30 pm, FloHoops		vs. Marshall; Cayman Islands Classic 5th-place game	W 78–71	3–3	John Gray Gymnasium; George Town, Cayman Islands
November 27, 2023*; 6:30 pm, FS1		at Xavier	W 78–76	4–3	Cintas Center (10,199); Cincinnati, OH
November 29, 2023; 7:00 pm, ESPN+		at Detroit Mercy; Metro Series	W 65–50	5–3 (1–0)	Calihan Hall (1,211); Detroit, MI
December 2, 2023; 3:00 pm, ESPN+		Purdue Fort Wayne	L 77–98	5–4 (1–1)	OU Credit Union O'rena (1,000); Auburn Hills, MI
December 6, 2023*; 7:00 pm, ESPN+		Toledo	L 68–69	5–5	OU Credit Union O'rena (2,893); Auburn Hills, MI
December 8, 2023*; 7:00 pm, ESPN+		at Eastern Michigan	W 77–63	6–5	George Gervin GameAbove Center (1,796); Ypsilanti, MI
December 18, 2023*; 7:00 pm, B1G		at Michigan State	L 62–79	6–6	Breslin Center (14,797); East Lansing, MI
December 20, 2023*; 7:00 pm, ESPN+		at Dayton	L 67–91	6–7	UD Arena (13,407); Dayton, OH
December 28, 2023; 7:00 pm, ESPN+		at Cleveland State	L 67–75	6–8 (1–2)	Wolstein Center (1,397); Cleveland, OH
December 31, 2023; 2:30 pm, ESPN+		at Youngstown State	W 88–81	7–8 (2–2)	Beeghly Center (2,456); Youngstown, OH
January 4, 2024; 7:00 pm, ESPN+		Milwaukee	W 100–95	8–8 (3–2)	OU Credit Union O'rena (2,248); Auburn Hills, MI
January 6, 2024; 3:00 pm, ESPN+		Green Bay	W 79–73	9–8 (4–2)	OU Credit Union O'rena (3,143); Auburn Hills, MI
January 10, 2024; 7:00 pm, ESPN+		Northern Kentucky	W 70–65 ^{OT}	10–8 (5–2)	OU Credit Union O'rena (2,683); Auburn Hills, MI
January 13, 2024; 2:00 pm, ESPN+		at IUPUI	W 88–66	11–8 (6–2)	Indiana Farmers Coliseum (809); Indianapolis, IN
January 17, 2024; 7:00 pm, ESPN+		Youngstown State	W 70–67	12–8 (7–2)	OU Credit Union O'rena (2,471); Auburn Hills, MI
January 25, 2024; 7:00 pm, ESPN+		at Green Bay	L 59–69	12–9 (7–3)	Resch Center (3,513); Ashwaubenon, WI
January 27, 2024; 4:00 pm, ESPN+		at Milwaukee	W 91–87 ^{OT}	13–9 (8–3)	UW–Milwaukee Panther Arena (2,729); Milwaukee, WI
February 1, 2024; 7:00 pm, ESPN+		Robert Morris	W 87–72	14–9 (9–3)	OU Credit Union O'rena (2,752); Auburn Hills, MI
February 3, 2024; 1:00 pm, ESPN+		Cleveland State	W 83–71	15–9 (10–3)	OU Credit Union O'rena (2,931); Auburn Hills, MI
February 8, 2024; 7:00 pm, ESPN+		at Northern Kentucky	L 89–99 ^{OT}	15–10 (10–4)	Truist Arena (2,702); Highland Heights, KY
February 10, 2024; 7:00 pm, ESPN+		at Wright State	W 74–60	16–10 (11–4)	Nutter Center (5,860); Fairborn, OH
February 14, 2024; 7:00 pm, ESPN+		at Purdue Fort Wayne	W 71–63	17–10 (12–4)	Allen County War Memorial Coliseum (1,604); Fort Wayne, IN
February 17, 2024; 3:00 pm, ESPN+		IUPUI	W 107–59	18–10 (13–4)	OU Credit Union O'rena (2,941); Auburn Hills, MI
February 22, 2024; 7:00 pm, ESPN+		at Robert Morris	W 63–43	19–10 (14–4)	UPMC Events Center (922); Moon Township, PA
February 25, 2024; 3:00 pm, ESPN+		Wright State	L 75–96	19–11 (14–5)	OU Credit Union O'rena (3,007); Auburn Hills, MI
March 2, 2024; 6:00 pm, ESPN+		Detroit Mercy; Metro Series	W 75–70	20–11 (15–5)	OU Credit Union O'rena (3,541); Auburn Hills, MI
Horizon League tournament
March 7, 2024; 7:00 pm, ESPN+	(1)	(8) Purdue Fort Wayne; Quarterfinals	W 75–65	21–11	OU Credit Union O'rena (3,721); Auburn Hills, MI
March 11, 2024; 7:00 pm, ESPNU	(1)	vs. (7) Cleveland State; Semifinals	W 74–71	22–11	Indiana Farmers Coliseum; Indianapolis, IN
March 12, 2024; 7:00 pm, ESPN	(1)	vs. (6) Milwaukee; Championship	W 83–76	23–11	Indiana Farmers Coliseum; Indianapolis, IN
NCAA tournament
March 21, 2024*; 7:10 pm, CBS	(14 S)	vs. (3 S) No. 12 Kentucky; First Round	W 80–76	24–11	PPG Paints Arena; Pittsburgh, PA
March 23, 2024*; 7:10 pm, TBS/TruTV	(14 S)	vs. (11 S) NC State; Second Round	L 73–79 ^{OT}	24–12	PPG Paints Arena (18,595); Pittsburgh, PA
*Non-conference game. ^{#}Rankings from AP poll. (#) Tournament seedings in parentheses. S=South region. All times are in Eastern.
