= 2023–24 Detroit Mercy Titans men's basketball team =

American college basketball season

2023–24 Detroit Mercy Titans men's basketball
- Conference: Horizon League
- Record: 1–31 (1–19 Horizon)
- Head coach: Mike Davis (6th season)
- Assistant coaches: Mike Davis Jr.; Donnie Marsh; Jerica Williams
- Home arena: Calihan Hall

2023–24 Horizon League men's basketball standings
	Conf.				Overall
Team	W		L	PCT	W		L	PCT
Oakland †	15	–	5	.750	24	–	12	.667
Youngstown State	14	–	6	.700	22	–	10	.688
Green Bay	13	–	7	.650	18	–	14	.563
Wright State	13	–	7	.650	18	–	14	.563
Northern Kentucky	12	–	8	.600	18	–	15	.545
Milwaukee	12	–	8	.600	20	–	15	.571
Cleveland State	11	–	9	.550	21	–	15	.583
Purdue Fort Wayne	11	–	9	.550	23	–	13	.639
Robert Morris	6	–	14	.300	10	–	22	.313
IUPUI	2	–	18	.100	6	–	26	.188
Detroit Mercy	1	–	19	.050	1	–	31	.031
† 2024 Horizon League tournament winner

The 2023–24 Detroit Mercy Titans men's basketball team represented the University of Detroit Mercy during the 2023–24 NCAA Division I men's basketball season. The Titans, led by sixth-year head coach Mike Davis, played their home games at the Calihan Hall. The Titans started the season losing their first 26 games. The Titans' only win of the season came on February 14, 2024 when they defeated IUPUI 81–66. They finished the season 1–31, 1–19 in Horizon League play to finish in last place. They lost to Milwaukee in the first round of the Horizon League Tournament.

On March 7, 2024, the school fired head coach Mike Davis. On April 3, Michigan State assistant coach Mark Montgomery was named the team's new coach.

== Previous season ==
The Titans finished the 2022-23 season 4–19, 9–11 in Horizon League play to finish in eighth place. They defeated Purdue Fort Wayne in the first round of the Horizon League tournament, before losing to top-seeded Youngstown State in the quarterfinals. The team was led by graduate student Antoine Davis, who was named Horizon League Player of the Year and was the NCAA's top scorer, finishing three points shy of Pete Maravich's all-time collegiate scoring record.

== Offseason ==
=== Departures ===
Detroit Mercy Departures
Name	Number	Pos.	Height	Weight	Year	Hometown	Reason for departure
Dazemi Anderson	23	F/G	6'7"	230	Graduate	South Bend, IN	Graduated
Antoine Davis	0	G	6'1"	165	Graduate	Birmingham, AL	Graduated/UDFA signed with Portland Trail Blazers
Sonny Johnson	5	G	5'10"	160	Freshman	Cleveland, OH	Left team
Isaiah Jones	13	G/F	6'8"	209	Freshman	Nashville, TN	Transferred to Oakland
Buay Koka	33	C	7'1"	202	Graduate	Nasir, South Sudan	Graduated
Gerald Liddell	11	F	6'8"	203	Senior	Cibolo, TX	Graduated
TJ Moss	1	G	6'4"	180	Graduate	Memphis, TN	Graduated
A.J. Oliver	21	G	6'5"	200	Graduate	Birmingham, AL	Graduated
Arashma Parks	15	F	6'9"	235	Graduate	Cleveland, OH	Graduated
Jordan Phillips	12	F	6'7"	215	Senior	Fort Worth, TX	Graduated

=== Incoming transfers ===
Detroit Mercy incoming transfers
Name	Number	Pos.	Height	Weight	Year	Hometown	Previous School
Jonathan Ammori	21	G	6'4"	180	Junior	West Bloomfield, MI	Oakland CC
Tyree Davis	13	F/G	6'6"	190	Sophomore	Houston, TX	Kilgore College
Edoardo Del Cadia	23	F	6'8"	240	Graduate	Senigallia, Italy	Nicholls
Oton Jankovic	33	F	6'10"	205	Graduate	Zagreb, Croatia	Tulane
Trenton Johnson	12	G	6'2"	180	Junior	South Bend, IN	Vincennes
Emmanuel Kuac	6	G/F	6'7"	210	Graduate	Calgary, AB	New Mexico
Mak Manciel	1	G	6'3"	200	Junior	Detroit, MI	Arkansas State
Abdullah Olajuwon	7	G	6'5"	210	(redshirt) Freshman	Houston, TX	Kansas City
Alex Tchikou	2	F	6'11"	230	Senior	Paris, France	Rhode Island
Donovann Toatley	8	G	5'10"	190	Graduate	Largo, MD	Bethune–Cookman

=== 2023 recruiting class ===
College recruiting information
Name	Hometown	School	Height	Weight	Commit date
Ryan Hurst; G	Farmington, MI	North Farmington	6 ft 3 in (1.91 m)	220 lb (100 kg)	May 15, 2023
Ryan Hurst; G	Recruit ratings: No ratings found				
Overall recruit ranking:
Note: In many cases, Scout, Rivals, 247Sports, On3, and ESPN may conflict in their listings of height and weight.; In these cases, the average was taken. ESPN grades are on a 100-point scale.; Sources: "2023 Team Ranking". Rivals.

== Roster ==
2023–24 Detroit Mercy Titans men's basketball team
Players
Coaches

Pos.	#	Name	Height	Weight	Year	Previous school	Hometown
G	1	Mak Manciel	6 ft 3 in (1.91 m)	200 lb (91 kg)	Jr	Arkansas State	Detroit, Michigan
F	2	Alex Tchikou	6 ft 11 in (2.11 m)	230 lb (104 kg)	Sr	Rhode Island	Paris, France
G	4	Marcus Tankersley	6 ft 4 in (1.93 m)	190 lb (86 kg)	So	Veritas Academy (FL)	Chattanooga, Tennessee
G	5	Kyle LeGreair	6 ft 0 in (1.83 m)	180 lb (82 kg)	Sr	Cass Technical HS	Detroit, Michigan
G/F	6	Emmanuel Kuac	6 ft 7 in (2.01 m)	210 lb (95 kg)	GS	New Mexico	Calgary, Alberta
G	7	Abdullah Olajuwon	6 ft 5 in (1.96 m)	210 lb (95 kg)	RS Fr	Kansas City	Houston, Texas
G	8	Donovann Toatley	5 ft 10 in (1.78 m)	190 lb (86 kg)	GS	Bethune–Cookman	Largo, Maryland
G	10	Jamail Pink (W)	6 ft 1 in (1.85 m)	170 lb (77 kg)	Jr	Clear Lake HS	Houston, Texas
G	11	Ryan Hurst	6 ft 3 in (1.91 m)	230 lb (104 kg)	Fr	North Farmington HS	Farmington, Michigan
G	12	Trenton Johnson	6 ft 2 in (1.88 m)	180 lb (82 kg)	Jr	Vincennes	South Bend, Indiana
G/F	13	Tyree Davis	6 ft 6 in (1.98 m)	190 lb (86 kg)	So	Kilgore College	Houston, Texas
G	14	Jayden Stone	6 ft 4 in (1.93 m)	200 lb (91 kg)	Sr	Grand Canyon	Perth, Australia
G	21	Jonathan Ammori	6 ft 4 in (1.93 m)	180 lb (82 kg)	Jr	Oakland CC	West Bloomfield, Michigan
F	23	Edoardo Del Cadia	6 ft 8 in (2.03 m)	240 lb (109 kg)	GS	Nicholls	Senigallia, Italy
F	33	Oton Jankovic	6 ft 10 in (2.08 m)	205 lb (93 kg)	GS	Tulane	Zagreb, Croatia
G	41	Tobin Schwannecke (W)	6 ft 3 in (1.91 m)	200 lb (91 kg)	Jr	Grand Valley State	Traverse City, Michigan

Head coach

- Mike Davis (Alabama)

Assistant coach(es)

- Mike Davis Jr. (UAB)
- Donnie Marsh (Franklin & Marshall)
- Kerry Rupp (Southern Utah)
- Jerica Williams (San Diego State)

Legend

- (C) Team captain
- (S) Suspended
- (I) Ineligible
- (W) Walk-on
- Injured
- Current redshirt

Roster
Last update: October 12, 2023

== Schedule and results ==
Date time, TV	Rank^{#}	Opponent^{#}	Result	Record	High points	High rebounds	High assists	Site (attendance) city, state
Exhibition
November 2, 2023*; 7:00 pm, ESPN+		Wayne State (MI)	L 78–88		34 – Stone	11 – Stone	4 – Del Cadia	Calihan Hall (1,011); Detroit, MI
Regular season
November 6, 2023*; 7:00 pm		at Toledo	L 60–94	0–1	20 – Toatley	6 – Tied	6 – Toatley	Savage Arena (4,223); Toledo, OH
November 10, 2023*; 7:00 pm, ESPN+		at Cincinnati; Walton Sports and Entertainment Event	L 61–93	0–2	25 – Stone	6 – Olajuwon	3 – Toatley	Fifth Third Arena (4,267); Cincinnati, OH
November 14, 2023*; 8:00 pm, SECN+		at Ole Miss; Walton Sports and Entertainment Event	L 69–70	0–3	22 – Stone	10 – Del Cadia	5 – Tankersley	SJB Pavilion (6,331); Oxford, MS
November 18, 2023*; 2:00 pm, ESPN+		at Ohio	L 52–71	0–4	14 – Tankersley	8 – Tied	3 – Johnson	Convocation Center (4,411); Athens, OH
November 21, 2023*; 7:00 pm, ESPN+		Eastern Michigan	L 72–76	0–5	34 – Stone	6 – Stone	4 – Tied	Calihan Hall (1,003); Detroit, MI
November 25, 2023*; 2:00 pm, ESPN+		at SIU Edwardsville	L 67–81	0–6	23 – Stone	6 – Del Cadia	4 – Del Cadia	First Community Arena (716); Edwardsville, IL
November 29, 2023; 7:00 pm, ESPN+		Oakland	L 50–65	0–7 (0–1)	18 – Stone	9 – Stone	6 – Stone	Calihan Hall (1,211); Detroit, MI
December 2, 2023; 3:00 pm, ESPN+		at Cleveland State	L 58–69	0–8 (0–2)	26 – Stone	8 – Tied	5 – Del Cadia	Wolstein Center (1,395); Cleveland, OH
December 6, 2023*; 7:00 pm, ESPN+		Ball State	L 65–68	0–9	18 – Stone	7 – Tied	3 – Stone	Calihan Hall (733); Detroit, MI
December 10, 2023*; 2:00 pm, BTN+		at Northwestern	L 59–91	0–10	23 – Tankersley	11 – Tankersley	2 – Tied	Welsh-Ryan Arena (4,550); Evanston, IL
December 18, 2023*; 10:00 pm, ESPN+		at Loyola Marymount	L 56–76	0–11	17 – Tankersley	6 – Del Cadia	2 – Tied	Gersten Pavilion (926); Los Angeles, CA
December 21, 2023*; 7:00 pm, ESPN+		at Central Michigan	L 63–75	0–12	16 – Hurst	9 – Hurst	4 – Manciel	McGuirk Arena (1,178); Mount Pleasant, MI
December 23, 2023*; 1:00 pm, ACCN		at NC State	L 66–83	0–13	21 – Toatley	12 – Del Cadia	3 – LeGreair	PNC Arena (12,594); Raleigh, NC
December 29, 2023; 12:00 pm, ESPN+		at IUPUI	L 55–67	0–14 (0–3)	22 – Hurst	6 – Manciel	3 – Tankersley	Indiana Farmers Coliseum (709); Indianapolis, IN
December 31, 2023; 2:00 pm, ESPN+		at Purdue Fort Wayne	L 56–91	0–15 (0–4)	16 – Del Cadia	14 – Del Cadia	3 – LeGreair	Hilliard Gates Sports Center (1,067); Fort Wayne, IN
January 4, 2024; 7:00 pm, ESPN+		Green Bay	L 51–69	0–16 (0–5)	14 – Toatley	6 – Tied	3 – Tankersley	Calihan Hall (1,003); Detroit, MI
January 6, 2024; 1:00 pm, ESPN+		Milwaukee	L 61–84	0–17 (0–6)	18 – Tankersley	8 – Olajuwon	2 – Tied	Calihan Hall (889); Detroit, MI
January 13, 2024; 1:00 pm, ESPN+		Northern Kentucky	L 76–81	0–18 (0–7)	27 – Stone	7 – Kauc	4 – Tankersley	Calihan Hall (627); Detroit, MI
January 17, 2024; 7:00 pm, ESPN+		at Robert Morris	L 99–102 ^{2OT}	0–19 (0–8)	36 – Stone	10 – Stone	5 – Manciel	UPMC Events Center (884); Moon Township, PA
January 20, 2024; 4:00 pm, ESPN+		Youngstown State	L 64–105	0–20 (0–9)	23 – Tankersley	5 – Stone	3 – Manciel	Calihan Hall (881); Detroit, MI
January 25, 2024; 8:00 pm, ESPN+		at Milwaukee	L 71–87	0–21 (0–10)	27 – Kuac	8 – Kuac	10 – Stone	UWM Panther Arena (2,341); Milwaukee, WI
January 27, 2024; 1:00 pm, ESPN+		at Green Bay	L 64–78	0–22 (0–11)	20 – Stone	5 – Olajuwon	4 – Tied	Resch Center (2,625); Ashwaubenon, WI
February 1, 2024; 7:00 pm, ESPN+		Cleveland State	L 65–77	0–23 (0–12)	28 – Stone	9 – Del Cadia	3 – Stone	Calihan Hall (420); Detroit, MI
February 3, 2024; 1:00 pm, ESPN+		Robert Morris	L 67–75	0–24 (0–13)	25 – Stone	6 – Stone	3 – Stone	Calihan Hall (812); Detroit, MI
February 8, 2024; 7:00 pm, ESPN+		at Wright State	L 85–92	0–25 (0–14)	29 – Tankersley	3 – Tied	6 – Tankersley	Nutter Center (3,363); Dayton, OH
February 10, 2024; 4:00 pm, ESPN+		at Northern Kentucky	L 67–79	0–26 (0–15)	24 – Tied	9 – Del Cadia	4 – Manciel	Truist Arena (3,119); Highland Heights, KY
February 14, 2024; 7:00 pm, ESPN+		IUPUI	W 81–66	1–26 (1–15)	25 – Stone	6 – Stone	3 – Tied	Calihan Hall (611); Detroit, MI
February 17, 2024; 1:00 pm, ESPN+		Purdue Fort Wayne	L 69–83	1–27 (1–16)	27 – Stone	6 – Tied	8 – Tankersley	Calihan Hall (1,213); Detroit, MI
February 22, 2024; 7:00 pm, ESPN+		Wright State	L 78–93	1–28 (1–17)	25 – Stone	5 – Tied	4 – Tankersley	Calihan Hall (871); Detroit, MI
February 28, 2024; 6:30 pm, ESPN+		at Youngstown State	L 55–69	1–29 (1–18)	22 – Tankersley	10 – Del Cadia	3 – Tied	Beeghly Center (3,413); Youngstown, OH
March 2, 2024; 6:00 pm, ESPN+		at Oakland	L 70–75	1–30 (1–19)	19 – Stone	7 – Stone	4 – Tied	Athletics Center O'Rena; Rochester, MI
Horizon League tournament
March 5, 2024; 7:00 pm, ESPN+	(11)	at (6) Milwaukee; First round	L 79–83	1–31	30 – Stone	6 – Del Cadia	4 – Tied	UWM Panther Arena (1,558); Milwaukee, WI
*Non-conference game. ^{#}Rankings from AP Poll. (#) Tournament seedings in parentheses. All times are in Eastern.
