= 2023–24 Wright State Raiders men's basketball team =

American college basketball season

2023–24 Wright State Raiders men's basketball
- Conference: Horizon League
- Record: 18–14 (13–7 Horizon)
- Head coach: Scott Nagy (8th season)
- Associate head coach: Clint Sargent
- Assistant coaches: Dan Beré; Travis Trice
- Home arena: Nutter Center

2023–24 Horizon League men's basketball standings
| | Conf. | | | | Overall |
| Team | W | | L | PCT | W | | L | PCT |
|---|---|---|---|---|---|---|---|---|
| Oakland † | 15 | – | 5 | .750 | 24 | – | 12 | .667 |
| Youngstown State | 14 | – | 6 | .700 | 22 | – | 10 | .688 |
| Green Bay | 13 | – | 7 | .650 | 18 | – | 14 | .563 |
| Wright State | 13 | – | 7 | .650 | 18 | – | 14 | .563 |
| Northern Kentucky | 12 | – | 8 | .600 | 18 | – | 15 | .545 |
| Milwaukee | 12 | – | 8 | .600 | 20 | – | 15 | .571 |
| Cleveland State | 11 | – | 9 | .550 | 21 | – | 15 | .583 |
| Purdue Fort Wayne | 11 | – | 9 | .550 | 23 | – | 13 | .639 |
| Robert Morris | 6 | – | 14 | .300 | 10 | – | 22 | .313 |
| IUPUI | 2 | – | 18 | .100 | 6 | – | 26 | .188 |
| Detroit Mercy | 1 | – | 19 | .050 | 1 | – | 31 | .031 |
† 2024 Horizon League tournament winner

The 2023–24 Wright State Raiders men's basketball team represented Wright State University in the 2023–24 NCAA Division I men's basketball season. The Raiders, led by eighth-year head coach Scott Nagy, played their home games at the Nutter Center in Fairborn, Ohio (with a Dayton mailing address) as members of the Horizon League.

== Season summary ==
2023-24 began with high expectations. The return of star shooting guard Tanner Holden to the team alongside point guard Trey Calvin put two eventual 2,000 point scorers in the starting lineup. Brandon Noel returned at power forward following his Horizon League Freshman of the Year season, and junior AJ Braun returned for his third year as starting center. Veterans Andrew Welage and Alex Huibregtse rounded out the main rotation. The only unexpected loss was the physical reserve forward Blake Sisley, who left basketball to concentrate on school.

Funny things happen with expectations, and reality came crashing down as the season began with a 28-point thrashing by fellow mid-major Colorado State, followed by losses to Toledo and Indiana. The remainder of the non-conference schedule was a middling win-one/ lose-one slog.

The Raiders began the Horizon League season in a hole with road losses both to surprising Green Bay and to Milwaukee. When the season might have been salvaged, a tired team fell apart down the stretch at Youngstown. The home court became anything but an advantage with shocking home losses to Green Bay, Youngstown State, Oakland and Purdue Fort Wayne. The season ended with an overtime home loss to rival Northern Kentucky, a rematch just five days after an emotional win on the same court.

For the season, the Raiders led the nation (363 teams) in shooting percentage (53%) and were top 5 in points per game (86.5). Center AJ Braun led the nation in individual shooting percentage (68.9%), but finished 341st in defensive efficiency.

The individual stats followed the team stats as all five starters averaged double-digits, including guard Alex Huibregtse who had a breakout year. Redshirt Freshmen Logan Woods, Kaden Brown and Drey Carter all logged productive minutes off the bench. Andrew Welage’s season was hampered by injuries and illness, but he gave all he had and had a standout game against Indiana.

== Aftermath ==
After the season of high expectations concluded with an opening game home tournament loss, Wright State said good-bye to star guards Trey Calvin and Tanner Holden, as expected. Andrew Welage also hung up his sneakers and graduated. Center AJ Braun decided to test the transfer portal with his impressive stats, and head coach Scott Nagy disappeared to Southern Illinois in a cloud of private-jet smoke.

== Previous season ==
The Raiders finished the 2022–23 season 18–15, 10–10 in Horizon League play to finish tied for sixth place. As the No. 7 seed, they defeated Green Bay, before losing in the quarter finals to No. 2 seed Milwaukee.

== Roster ==
2023–24 Wright State Raiders men's basketball team
Players
Coaches

| Pos. | # | Name | Height | Weight | Year | Hometown |
|---|---|---|---|---|---|---|
| PG | 1 | Trey Calvin | 6 ft 0 in (1.83 m) | 165 lb (75 kg) | GS | Glendale Heights, Illinois |
| G | 2 | Drey Carter | 6 ft 8 in (2.03 m) | 190 lb (86 kg) | RS Fr | Bellefontaine, Ohio |
| G | 3 | Alex Huibregtse | 6 ft 3 in (1.91 m) | 195 lb (88 kg) | RS Jr | Grafton, Wisconsin |
| G | 4 | Keaton Norris (redshirt) | 6 ft 0 in (1.83 m) | 165 lb (75 kg) | Jr | Hilliard, Ohio |
| G | 5 | Bo Myers | 6 ft 6 in (1.98 m) | 200 lb (91 kg) | GS | Bloomington, Illinois |
| C | 12 | AJ Braun | 6 ft 9 in (2.06 m) | 225 lb (102 kg) | Jr | Dayton, Ohio |
| G | 13 | Solomon Callaghan (redshirt) | 6 ft 2 in (1.88 m) | 185 lb (84 kg) | Fr | Wadsworth, Ohio |
| F | 14 | Brandon Noel | 6 ft 8 in (2.03 m) | 235 lb (107 kg) | RS So | Lucasville, Ohio |
| F | 15 | Braden Grant | 6 ft 7 in (2.01 m) | 220 lb (100 kg) | RS So | Beavercreek, Ohio |
| G | 21 | Logan Woods | 6 ft 5 in (1.96 m) | 180 lb (82 kg) | RS Fr | Fairfield, Ohio |
| G | 22 | Andrew Welage | 6 ft 6 in (1.98 m) | 180 lb (82 kg) | Sr | Greensburg, Indiana |
| G | 23 | Tanner Holden | 6 ft 6 in (1.98 m) | 200 lb (91 kg) | GS | Wheelersburg, Ohio |
| F | 24 | Carson Schwieger (redshirt) | 6 ft 8 in (2.03 m) | 200 lb (91 kg) | Fr | Overland Park, KS |
| G | 25 | Dayjaun Anderson (redshirt) | 6 ft 2 in (1.88 m) | 180 lb (82 kg) | Fr | Dayton, OH |
| G | 30 | Kaden Brown | 6 ft 0 in (1.83 m) | 175 lb (79 kg) | RS Fr | Grand Rapids, MI |

Head coach

- Scott Nagy (Delta State)

Assistant coach(es)

- Clint Sargent (associate head coach) (South Dakota State)
- Dan Beré (Indiana)
- Travis Trice (Butler)

Legend

- (C) Team captain
- (S) Suspended
- (I) Ineligible
- (W) Walk-on
- Injured
- Current redshirt

Roster
Last update: September 20, 2023

== Schedule and results ==
| Date time, TV | Rank^{#} | Opponent^{#} | Result | Record | Site (attendance) city, state |
Regular season
| November 10, 2023*; 9:00 pm, ESPN+ | | at Colorado State | L 77–105 | 0–1 | Moby Arena (4,802); Fort Collins, CO |
| November 14, 2023*; 7:00 pm, ESPN+ | | Toledo | L 77–78 | 0–2 | Nutter Center (4,239); Fairborn, OH |
| November 16, 2023*; 7:00 pm, BTN | | at Indiana | L 80–89 | 0–3 | Simon Skjodt Assembly Hall (17,222); Bloomington, IN |
| November 20, 2023*; 5:00 pm, FloHoops | | vs. Louisiana; Gulf Coast Showcase quarterfinals | W 91–85 | 1–3 | Hertz Arena (213); Estero, FL |
| November 21, 2023*; 7:30 pm, FloHoops | | vs. Hofstra; Gulf Coast Showcase semifinals | L 76–85 | 1–4 | Hertz Arena (342); Estero, FL |
| November 22, 2023*; 5:00 pm, FloHoops | | vs. Illinois State; Gulf Coast Showcase | W 74–49 | 2–4 | Hertz Arena (312); Estero, FL |
| November 29, 2023; 7:00 pm, ESPN+ | | IUPUI | W 103–74 | 3–4 (1–0) | Nutter Center (3,531); Fairborn, OH |
| December 2, 2023*; 3:00 pm, ESPN+ | | at Davidson | L 73–82 | 3–5 | John M. Belk Arena (2,783); Davidson, NC |
| December 7, 2023*; 7:00 pm, ESPN+ | | Bethel | W 81–62 | 4–5 | Nutter Center (3,247); Fairborn, OH |
| December 12, 2023*; 7:00 pm, ESPN+ | | Western Kentucky | L 84–91 | 4–6 | Nutter Center (3,138); Fairborn, OH |
| December 19, 2023*; 7:00 pm, ESPN+ | | Miami (OH) | W 92–82 | 5–6 | Nutter Center (3,814); Fairborn, OH |
| December 22, 2023*; 1:00 pm, ESPN+ | | Muskingum | W 101–54 | 6–6 | Nutter Center (3,184); Fairborn, OH |
| December 29, 2023; 1:00 pm, ESPN+ | | at Green Bay | L 77–88 | 6–7 (1–1) | Resch Center (1,917); Ashwaubenon, WI |
| December 31, 2023; 3:00 pm, ESPN+ | | at Milwaukee | L 83–91 | 6–8 (1–2) | UW–Milwaukee Panther Arena (1,794); Milwaukee, WI |
| January 4, 2024; 7:00 pm, ESPN2/ESPN+ | | Cleveland State | W 82–70 | 7–8 (2–2) | Nutter Center (3,572); Fairborn, OH |
| January 6, 2024; 1:00 pm, ESPN+ | | at Purdue Fort Wayne | W 106–98 | 8–8 (3–2) | Gates Sports Center (1,237); Fort Wayne, IN |
| January 10, 2024; 7:00 pm, ESPN+ | | at Robert Morris | W 101–76 | 9–8 (4–2) | UPMC Events Center (741); Moon Township, PA |
| January 12, 2024; 6:30 pm, ESPN2/ESPN+ | | at Youngstown State | L 71–81 | 9–9 (4–3) | Beeghly Center (2,672); Youngstown, OH |
| January 18, 2024; 7:00 pm, ESPN+ | | Green Bay | L 81–88 | 9–10 (4–4) | Nutter Center (3,590); Fairborn, OH |
| January 20, 2024; 7:00 pm, ESPN+ | | Milwaukee | W 95–81 | 10–10 (5–4) | Nutter Center (5,398); Fairborn, OH |
| January 25, 2024; 7:00 pm, ESPN+ | | at Cleveland State | W 107–99 | 11–10 (6–4) | Wolstein Center (1,864); Cleveland, OH |
| January 28, 2024; 12:00 pm, ESPN+ | | at IUPUI | W 83–76 | 12–10 (7–4) | Indiana Farmers Coliseum (720); Indianapolis, IN |
| February 1, 2024; 9:00 pm, ESPNU/ESPN+ | | Youngstown State | L 77–88 | 12–11 (7–5) | Nutter Center (3,588); Fairborn, OH |
| February 4, 2024; 2:00 pm, ESPN+ | | at Northern Kentucky | W 85–78 | 13–11 (8–5) | Truist Arena (4,760); Highland Heights, KY |
| February 8, 2024; 7:00 pm, ESPN+ | | Detroit Mercy | W 92–85 | 14–11 (9–5) | Nutter Center (3,363); Fairborn, OH |
| February 10, 2024; 7:00 pm, ESPN+ | | Oakland | L 60–74 | 14–12 (9–6) | Nutter Center (5,860); Fairborn, OH |
| February 17, 2024; 1:00 pm, ESPN+ | | Robert Morris | W 101–71 | 15–12 (10–6) | Nutter Center (5,057); Fairborn, OH |
| February 22, 2024; 7:00 pm, ESPN+ | | at Detroit Mercy | W 93–78 | 16–12 (11–6) | Calihan Hall (871); Detroit, MI |
| February 25, 2024; 3:00 pm, ESPN+ | | at Oakland | W 96–75 | 17–12 (12–6) | Athletics Center O'rena (3,007); Auburn Hills, MI |
| February 28, 2024; 7:00 pm, ESPN+ | | Purdue Fort Wayne | L 77–79 ^{OT} | 17–13 (12–7) | Nutter Center (3,531); Fairborn, OH |
| March 2, 2024; 7:00 pm, ESPN+ | | Northern Kentucky | W 94–88 | 18–13 (13–7) | Nutter Center (5,232); Fairborn, OH |
Horizon League tournament
| March 7, 2024; 7:00 pm, ESPN+ | (4) | (5) Northern Kentucky; Quarterfinals | L 97–99 ^{OT} | 18–14 | Nutter Center (4,725); Fairborn, OH |
*Non-conference game. ^{#}Rankings from AP Poll. (#) Tournament seedings in parentheses. All times are in Eastern.

== Awards and honors ==
| Trey Calvin | First Team All Horizon League |
| Brandon Noel | Second Team All Horizon League |
| Tanner Holden | Third Team All Horizon League |

== Statistics ==
| Number | Name | Games | Average | Points | Assists | Rebounds |
|---|---|---|---|---|---|---|
| 1 | Trey Calvin | 31 | 19.6 | 607 | 131 | 74 |
| 1 | Tanner Holden | 32 | 16.3 | 522 | 115 | 205 |
| 14 | Brandon Noel | 31 | 14.5 | 451 | 50 | 248 |
| 3 | Alex Huibregtse | 32 | 12.3 | 392 | 107 | 122 |
| 12 | AJ Braun | 32 | 12.0 | 383 | 29 | 199 |
| 22 | Andrew Welage | 26 | 5.1 | 132 | 33 | 44 |
| 2 | Drey Carter | 32 | 4.2 | 133 | 18 | 51 |
| 30 | Kaden Brown | 29 | 2.3 | 66 | 26 | 23 |
| 21 | Logan Woods | 27 | 2.3 | 61 | 19 | 32 |
| 5 | Bo Myers | 10 | 2.0 | 61 | 19 | 32 |
| 15 | Braden Grant | 3 | 0.0 | 61 | 19 | 32 |
