= 2024 Horizon League men's basketball tournament =

American college basketball postseason tournament

- Classification: Division I
- Season: 2023–24
- Teams: 11
- Site: Campus sites (First Round and Quarterfinals); Indiana Farmers Coliseum; Indianapolis, Indiana (Semifinals and Finals)
- Champions: Oakland (1st title)
- Winning coach: Greg Kampe (1st title)
- Attendance: 17,792 (total, first two rounds only)
- Television: ESPN+, ESPNU, ESPN2, ESPN

2023–24 Horizon League men's basketball standings
	Conf.				Overall
Team	W		L	PCT	W		L	PCT
Oakland †	15	–	5	.750	24	–	12	.667
Youngstown State	14	–	6	.700	22	–	10	.688
Green Bay	13	–	7	.650	18	–	14	.563
Wright State	13	–	7	.650	18	–	14	.563
Northern Kentucky	12	–	8	.600	18	–	15	.545
Milwaukee	12	–	8	.600	20	–	15	.571
Cleveland State	11	–	9	.550	21	–	15	.583
Purdue Fort Wayne	11	–	9	.550	23	–	13	.639
Robert Morris	6	–	14	.300	10	–	22	.313
IUPUI	2	–	18	.100	6	–	26	.188
Detroit Mercy	1	–	19	.050	1	–	31	.031
† 2024 Horizon League tournament winner

The 2024 Horizon League Men's Basketball Tournament was the final event of the 2023–24 men's basketball season for the Horizon League. It was held from March 5–12, 2024; first-round and quarterfinal games were played at the home courts of the higher seeds, with all remaining games at Indiana Farmers Coliseum in Indianapolis. The winner, Oakland, received the conference's automatic berth into the NCAA Tournament. The tournament was sponsored by Barbasol.

== Seeds ==
All of the teams will participate in the tournament with the top-five teams receiving byes to the quarterfinals.

Seed	School	Conf	Tiebreaker
1	Oakland	15−5	
2	Youngstown State	14−6	
3	Green Bay	13−7	2–0 vs. Wright State
4	Wright State	13−7	0–2 vs. Green Bay
5	Northern Kentucky	12−8	1–1 vs. Milwaukee/1–1 vs. Oakland
6	Milwaukee	12−8	1–1 vs. Northern Kentucky/0–2 vs. Oakland
7	Cleveland State	11−9	2–0 vs. Purdue Fort Wayne
8	Purdue Fort Wayne	11−9	0–2 vs. Cleveland State
9	Robert Morris	6−14	
10	IUPUI	2−18	
11	Detroit Mercy	1−19	

== Schedule ==
Game	Time	Matchup	Score	Television	Attendance
First round – Tuesday, March 5
1	8:00 pm	No. 11 Detroit Mercy at No. 6 Milwaukee	79–83	ESPN+	1,558
2	7:00 pm	No. 10 IUPUI at No. 7 Cleveland State	66–85	ESPN+	1,333
3	7:00 pm	No. 9 Robert Morris at No. 8 Purdue Fort Wayne	63–78	ESPN+	959
Quarterfinals – Thursday, March 7
4	7:00 pm	No. 8 Purdue Fort Wayne at No. 1 Oakland	65–75	ESPN+	3,721
5	7:00 pm	No. 7 Cleveland State at No. 2 Youngstown State	82–70	ESPN+	3,102
6	9:00 pm	No. 6 Milwaukee at No. 3 Green Bay	95–84	ESPN+	2,394
7	8:00 pm	No. 5 Northern Kentucky at No. 4 Wright State	99–97 ^{OT}	ESPN+	4,725
Semifinals – Monday, March 11 at Indiana Farmers Coliseum, Indianapolis, IN
8	7:00 pm	No. 7 Cleveland State vs. No. 1 Oakland	71–74	ESPNU	—
9	9:30 pm	No. 6 Milwaukee vs. No. 5 Northern Kentucky	82–75	ESPN2	—
Championship – Tuesday, March 12 at Indiana Farmers Coliseum, Indianapolis, IN
10	7:00 pm	No. 1 Oakland vs. No. 6 Milwaukee	83–76	ESPN	—
All game times Eastern. Rankings denote tournament seed

== Bracket ==
The Horizon League does not use a fixed bracket tournament system, and pairings are re-seeded after the first and second rounds.

First round Tuesday, March 5
8	Purdue Fort Wayne	78
9	Robert Morris	63
7	Cleveland State	85
10	IUPUI	66
6	Milwaukee	83
11	Detroit Mercy	79

Quarterfinals; Thursday, March 7
1	Oakland	75
8	Purdue Fort Wayne	65
4	Wright State	97
5	Northern Kentucky	99*
2	Youngstown State	70
7	Cleveland State	82
3	Green Bay	84
6	Milwaukee	95

Semifinals; Monday, March 11
1	Oakland	74
7	Cleveland State	71
5	Northern Kentucky	75
6	Milwaukee	82

Championship; Tuesday, March 12
1	Oakland	83
6	Milwaukee	76
