= Tristan Enaruna =

Dutch basketball player (born 2001)

Free agent
- Position: Small forward

Personal information
- Born: 26 June 2001 (age 25) Almere, Netherlands
- Listed height: 6 ft 7 in (2.01 m)
- Listed weight: 220 lb (100 kg)

Career information
- High school: Wasatch Academy (Mount Pleasant, Utah)
- College: Kansas (2019–2021); Iowa State (2021–2022); Cleveland State (2022–2024)
- NBA draft: 2024: undrafted
- Playing career: 2017–present

Career history
- 2017–2018: Apollo Amsterdam
- 2024–2025: Maine Celtics
- 2025–2026: Cleveland Charge
- 2026: Cleveland Cavaliers
- 2026: →Cleveland Charge

Career highlights
- NBA G League Most Improved Player (2026); 2× First-team All-Horizon League (2023, 2024)
- Stats at NBA.com
- Stats at Basketball Reference

Tristan Enaruna (born 26 June 2001) is a Dutch professional basketball player who last played for the Cleveland Cavaliers of the National Basketball Association (NBA). He played college basketball for the Kansas Jayhawks, Iowa State Cyclones, and Cleveland State Vikings.

== Early career ==
Born in Almere, Enaruna started playing junior basketball with Almere Pioneers. He later played for the youth academy of Apollo Amsterdam.

In the 2017–18 season, Enaruna made his debut with Apollo Amsterdam in the professional Dutch Basketball League (DBL) at age 16. He earned a spot on the roster alongside his brother Iyen. On July 10, 2017, Enaruna played his first professional game, playing 7 minutes in a 82–80 win over Rotterdam. Over the course of the season, he participated in three games, averaging 12 minutes and 2.7 points per game.

In the 2018–19 season, Enaruna played with Wasatch Academy in the United States.

== College career ==
In May 2019, Enaruna committed to play collegiately for Kansas.

On 19 April 2021, Enaruna transferred to Iowa State. He scored a career-high 23 points on January 1, 2022, in a 77–72 loss to Baylor. In April 2022, Enaruna transferred to Cleveland State. He averaged 15.1 points and 6.6 rebounds per game and was named to the First Team All-Horizon League. In his final season of eligibility, Enaruna averaged 19.6 points, 6.5 rebounds, 2.7 assists and 1.2 steals per game.

== Professional career ==
=== Maine Celtics (2025–2026) ===
After going undrafted in the 2024 NBA draft, Enaruna joined the Boston Celtics for the 2024 NBA Summer League and on 10 July 2024, he signed with the team. However, he was waived on 8 October and on 26 October, he joined the Maine Celtics.

=== Cleveland Cavaliers / Charge (2026) ===
For the 2025–26 season, Enaruna was added to the roster of the Cleveland Cavaliers' NBA G League affiliate, the Cleveland Charge. On January 28, 2026, Enaruna signed a two-way contract with the Cavaliers.

== Career statistics ==
Legend
GP	Games played	GS	Games started	MPG	Minutes per game
FG%	Field goal percentage	3P%	3-point field goal percentage	FT%	Free throw percentage
RPG	Rebounds per game	APG	Assists per game	SPG	Steals per game
BPG	Blocks per game	PPG	Points per game	**Bold**	Career high

=== NBA ===
Year	Team	GP	GS	MPG	FG%	3P%	FT%	RPG	APG	SPG	BPG	PPG
2025–26	Cleveland	9	0	9.4	.500	.300	.750	1.6	.8	.6	.0	4.1
Career		9	0	9.4	.500	.300	.750	1.6	.8	.6	.0	4.1

=== College ===
Year	Team	GP	GS	MPG	FG%	3P%	FT%	RPG	APG	SPG	BPG	PPG
2019–20	Kansas	30	0	10.9	.342	.258	.500	2.2	.6	.5	.3	2.4
2020–21	Kansas	25	0	9.4	.415	.227	.667	1.6	.3	.4	.2	2.8
2021–22	Iowa State	33	0	14.4	**.545**	.300	**.731**	2.9	.3	.5	.2	4.3
2022–23	Cleveland State	**35**	35	31.9	.516	.189	.690	**6.5**	1.4	1.0	**1.1**	15.6
2023–24	Cleveland State	**35**	35	**33.2**	.498	**.322**	.721	**6.5**	**2.7**	**1.2**	0.8	**19.6**
Career		158	70	21.0	.494	.266	.697	4.4	1.1	.7	.6	9.6

== Personal ==
Enaruna has an older brother, Iyen, who also plays college basketball for the Evansville Purple Aces.
