= Matt Crenshaw =

American basketball player and coach (born 1978)

Personal information
- Born: July 19, 1978 (age 48) Charlottesville, Virginia, U.S.
- Listed height: 6 ft 2 in (1.88 m)
- Listed weight: 200 lb (91 kg)

Career information
- High school: Charlottesville (Charlottesville, Virginia)
- College: IUPUI (2000–2004)
- NBA draft: 2004: undrafted
- Playing career: 2004–2006
- Position: Point guard
- Coaching career: 2005–present

Career history

Playing
- 2004–2005: Czarni Słupsk
- 2005: SPU Nitra
- 2005–2006: Kentucky Colonels

Coaching
- 2005–2006: Kentucky Colonels (assistant)
- 2006–2011: IUPUI (assistant)
- 2011–2018: IUPUI (associate HC)
- 2018–2021: Ball State (assistant)
- 2021–2024: IUPUI
- 2025–2026: Delaware State (women's assistant)

Career highlights
- As player: Mid Continent Defensive Player of the Year (2004)

Matthew Crenshaw (born July 19, 1978) is an American basketball coach and former point guard who was most recently the head coach of Indiana University–Purdue University Indianapolis' men's basketball team.

== Military career ==
Crenshaw enlisted in the United States Navy out of high school and spent six years in the service, assigned to posts such as the USS Kansas City, Navy Cargo Handling Port Group (NAVCHAPGRU), and in Washington, D.C.

== Coaching career ==
=== IUPUI ===
IUPUI hired Crenshaw as an assistant coach in 2006, and promoted him to associate head coach in 2011.

=== Ball State ===
Crenshaw joined the coaching staff at Ball State as an assistant coach on October 19, 2018.

=== IUPUI (second stint) ===
Crenshaw was named the head coach at IUPUI on April 13, 2021, the program's tenth in school history. Crenshaw was fired after the 2023–24 ending with a record of 14-79.

== Head coaching record ==
Record table
Season	Coach	Overall	Conference	Standing	Postseason
IUPUI Jaguars (Horizon League) (2021–2024)
2021–22	IUPUI	3–26	1–16	12th	
2022–23	IUPUI	5–27	2–18	T–10th	
2023–24	IUPUI	6–26	2–18	10th	
IUPUI:		14–79 (.151)	5–52 (.088)		
Total:		14–79 (.151)			
National champion Postseason invitational champion Conference regular season champion Conference regular season and conference tournament champion Division regular season champion Division regular season and conference tournament champion Conference tournament champion
