= Greg Kampe =

American basketball coach (born 1955)

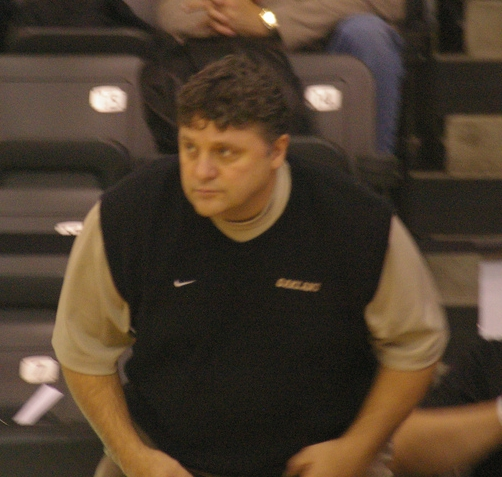
- Kampe during a game in 2009

Current position
- Title: Head coach
- Team: Oakland
- Conference: Horizon League
- Record: 731–570 (.562)

Biographical details
- Born: December 9, 1955 (age 70); Defiance, Ohio, U.S.

Playing career
- 1974–1978: Bowling Green

Coaching career (HC unless noted)
- 1978–1984: Toledo (asst.)
- 1984–present: Oakland

Head coaching record
- Overall: 731–570 (.562)
- Tournaments: 2–4 (NCAA Division I); 3–5 (NCAA Division II); 1–1 (NIT); 4–4 (CIT); 2–1 (Vegas 16)

Accomplishments and honors

Championships
- Horizon League tournament (2024); 2 Horizon League regular season (2017, 2024); 3 Summit League tournament (2005, 2010, 2011); 3 Summit League regular season (2000, 2010, 2011); 2 GLIAC regular season (1996, 1997)

Awards
- 4× Summit League Coach of the Year (2000, 2007, 2010, 2011); GLIAC Coach of the Year (1988); Gene Bartow Award (2026)

Greg Charles Kampe (/ˈkæmpi/; born December 9, 1955) is an American college basketball coach and the current head men's basketball coach at Oakland University.

== High school ==
Kampe participated in football, basketball, and track and field at Defiance High School in Defiance, Ohio. As a senior, he was named to the football Class AAA defensive second team as a back. He was named to the basketball Class AAA All-District second team, averaging 20.8 points per game as a senior.

== College ==
Kampe attended Bowling Green State University, where he played football and basketball. Kampe was a kicker, punter and cornerback on the football team. In a 16–14 win over Southern Mississippi in 1975, Kampe broke the Mid-American Conference and BGSU record for average yards per punt with 57.5. A 77-yard punt in the game also set the BGSU record for longest punt.

== Coaching career ==
Kampe guided the Golden Grizzlies to their first NCAA Division I tournament in 2005, winning in the opening round.

Kampe, a member of the Michigan Sports Hall of Fame, is one of nine Division I basketball coaches who have been at the same school for at least 25 seasons. Kampe won The Summit League's coach of the year four times, the most recent being in 2010 and 2011.

Kampe won his 500th career game January 26, 2013.

On May 30, 2017, Kampe was one of eight new inductees announced for the Michigan Sports Hall of Fame in Detroit. The ceremony took place on September 15, 2017.

In the fall of 2017, Kampe was enshrined in the Basketball Coaches Association of Michigan (BCAM) Hall of Fame.

On February 16, 2018, Kampe won his 600th career game.

On March 8, 2023, Kampe became the current longest tenured men’s college basketball coach after Jim Boeheim retired after 47 years.

On March 12, 2024, Kampe led the Golden Grizzlies to a 83-76 Horizon League Tournament Championship victory over the Milwaukee Panthers. It was Oakland’s first Horizon League tournament championship. Kampe then won his first Round of 64 game in the NCAA tournament as a 14-seed over 3-seed Kentucky.

On November 4, 2024, Kampe won his 700th career game.

== Charity ==
Kampe raised over $200,000 for the American Cancer Society in 2015 with an auction for rounds of golf at Oakland Hills Country Club with other NCAA college basketball coaches.

== Head coaching record ==
Record table
Season	Team	Overall	Conference	Standing	Postseason
Oakland Pioneers (Great Lakes Intercollegiate Athletic Conference) (1984–1997)
1984–85	Oakland	13–15	5–11	T–7th	
1985–86	Oakland	13–15	5–11	8th	
1986–87	Oakland	19–9	10–6	4th	
1987–88	Oakland	19–9	11–5	3rd	
1988–89	Oakland	20–8	10–6	3rd	
1989–90	Oakland	19–9	10–6	4th	
1990–91	Oakland	16–13	10–6	3rd	
1991–92	Oakland	16–13	8–8	T–4th	
1992–93	Oakland	15–11	9–7	T–3rd	
1993–94	Oakland	21–10	11–7	4th	NCAA Division II Regional Fourth Place
1994–95	Oakland	20–9	12–6	2nd	NCAA Division II First Round
1995–96	Oakland	21–8	13–5	T–1st	NCAA Division II First Round
1996–97	Oakland	23–8	14–3	1st (South)	NCAA Division II Sweet Sixteen
Oakland Golden Grizzlies (NCAA Division II Independent) (1997–1999)
1997–98	Oakland	15–12			
1998–99	Oakland	12–15			
Oakland Golden Grizzlies (Mid-Continent Conference/The Summit League) (1999–2013)
1999–00	Oakland	13–17	11–5	1st	
2000–01	Oakland	12–16	8–8	5th	
2001–02	Oakland	17–13	10–4	T–2nd	
2002–03	Oakland	17–11	10–4	T–2nd	
2003–04	Oakland	13–17	6–10	T–7th	
2004–05	Oakland	13–19	7–9	T–5th	NCAA Division I Round of 64
2005–06	Oakland	11–18	6–10	7th	
2006–07	Oakland	19–14	10–4	2nd	
2007–08	Oakland	17–14	11–7	T–3rd	
2008–09	Oakland	23–13	13–5	3rd	CIT Second Round
2009–10	Oakland	26–9	17–1	1st	NCAA Division I Round of 64
2010–11	Oakland	25–10	17–1	1st	NCAA Division I Round of 64
2011–12	Oakland	20–16	11–7	3rd	CIT Semifinals
2012–13	Oakland	16–17	10–6	4th	CIT First Round
Oakland Golden Grizzlies (Horizon League) (2013–present)
2013–14	Oakland	13–20	7–9	T–5th	
2014–15	Oakland	16–17	11–5	T–3rd	CIT First Round
2015–16	Oakland	23–12	13–5	T–2nd	Vegas 16 Runner-Up
2016–17	Oakland	25–9	14–4	T–1st	NIT Second Round
2017–18	Oakland	19–14	10–8	4th	
2018–19	Oakland	16–17	11–7	3rd	
2019–20	Oakland	14–19	8–10	6th	
2020–21	Oakland	12–18	10–10	5th	
2021–22	Oakland	20–12	12–7	5th	
2022–23	Oakland	13–19	11–9	5th	
2023–24	Oakland	24–12	15–5	1st	NCAA Division I Round of 32
2024–25	Oakland	16–18	11–9	T-6th	
2025–26	Oakland	16–16	12–8	T-3rd	
2026–27	Oakland	0–0	0–0		
Oakland:		731–571 (.561)	420–264 (.614)		
Total:		731–571 (.561)			
National champion Postseason invitational champion Conference regular season champion Conference regular season and conference tournament champion Division regular season champion Division regular season and conference tournament champion Conference tournament champion

== See also ==
- List of college men's basketball coaches with 600 wins
