= 2023 Horizon League men's basketball tournament =

Collegiate basketball event

- Classification: Division I
- Season: 2022–23
- Teams: 11
- Site: Campus sites (first round and quarterfinals); Indiana Farmers Coliseum; Indianapolis, Indiana (semifinals round and finals)
- Champions: Northern Kentucky (4th title)
- Winning coach: Darrin Horn (2nd title)
- Television: ESPN+, ESPNU, ESPN2, ESPN

The 2023 Horizon League Men's Basketball Tournament was the final event of the 2022–23 men's basketball season for the Horizon League. It began on February 28, 2023, and ended on March 7; first-round and quarterfinal games were played at the home courts of the higher seeds, with all remaining games at Indiana Farmers Coliseum in Indianapolis. The winner, Northern Kentucky, received the conference's automatic berth into the NCAA Tournament.

2022–23 Horizon League men's basketball standings
| | Conf. | | | | Overall |
| Team | W | | L | PCT | W | | L | PCT |
|---|---|---|---|---|---|---|---|---|
| Youngstown State | 15 | – | 5 | .750 | 24 | – | 10 | .706 |
| Milwaukee | 14 | – | 6 | .700 | 22 | – | 12 | .647 |
| Cleveland State | 14 | – | 6 | .700 | 21 | – | 14 | .600 |
| Northern Kentucky † | 14 | – | 6 | .700 | 22 | – | 13 | .629 |
| Oakland | 11 | – | 9 | .550 | 13 | – | 19 | .406 |
| Wright State | 10 | – | 10 | .500 | 18 | – | 15 | .545 |
| Robert Morris | 10 | – | 10 | .500 | 16 | – | 17 | .485 |
| Detroit Mercy | 9 | – | 11 | .450 | 14 | – | 19 | .424 |
| Purdue Fort Wayne | 9 | – | 11 | .450 | 17 | – | 15 | .531 |
| IUPUI | 2 | – | 18 | .100 | 5 | – | 27 | .156 |
| Green Bay | 2 | – | 18 | .100 | 3 | – | 29 | .094 |
† 2023 Horizon League tournament winner

== Seeds ==
All of the teams will participate in the tournament with the top-five teams receiving byes to the quarterfinals.

| Seed | School | Conf | Tiebreaker |
|---|---|---|---|
| 1 | Youngstown State | 15−5 | |
| 2 | Milwaukee | 14−6 | 4-0 vs. Cleveland State/Northern Kentucky |
| 3 | Cleveland State | 14−6 | 1-1 vs. NKU; 4-0 vs. RMU/Wright State |
| 4 | Northern Kentucky | 14−6 | 1-1 vs. CSU; 3-1 vs. RMU/Wright State |
| 5 | Oakland | 11−9 | |
| 6 | Robert Morris | 10−10 | 1-1 vs. Youngstown State |
| 7 | Wright State | 10−10 | 0-2 vs. Youngstown State |
| 8 | Detroit Mercy | 9−11 | 2-0 vs. Purdue Fort Wayne |
| 9 | Purdue Fort Wayne | 9−11 | 0-2 vs. Detroit Mercy |
| 10 | Green Bay | 2−18 | 1-1 vs. Milwaukee |
| 11 | IUPUI | 2−18 | 0-2 vs. Milwaukee |

== Schedule ==
| Game | Time | Matchup | Score | Television |
First round – Tuesday, February 28
| 1 | 7:00 pm | No. 11 IUPUI at No. 6 Robert Morris | 64–67 | ESPN+ |
| 2 | 7:00 pm | No. 10 Green Bay at No. 7 Wright State | 57–77 | ESPN+ |
| 3 | 7:00 pm | No. 9 Purdue Fort Wayne at No. 8 Detroit Mercy | 68–81 | ESPN+ |
Quarterfinals – Thursday, March 2
| 4 | 8:00 pm | No. 8 Detroit Mercy at No. 1 Youngstown State | 66–77 | ESPN+ |
| 5 | 8:00 pm | No. 7 Wright St at No. 2 Milwaukee | 70–87 | ESPN+ |
| 6 | 8:00 pm | No. 6 Robert Morris at No. 3 Cleveland State | 70–75 ^{OT} | ESPN+ |
| 7 | 7:00 pm | No. 5 Oakland at No. 4 Northern Kentucky | 74–81 | ESPN+ |
Semifinals – Monday, March 6 at Indiana Farmers Coliseum, Indianapolis, IN
| 8 | 7:00 pm | No. 4 Northern Kentucky vs. No. 1 Youngstown State | 75–63 | ESPNU |
| 9 | 9:30 pm | No. 3 Cleveland State vs. No. 2 Milwaukee | 93–80 | ESPN2 |
Championship – Tuesday, March 7 at Indiana Farmers Coliseum, Indianapolis, IN
| 10 | 7:00 pm | No. 4 Northern Kentucky vs. No. 3 Cleveland State | 63–61 | ESPN |
All game times Eastern. Rankings denote tournament seed

== Bracket ==
The Horizon League does not use a fixed bracket tournament system, and pairings are re-seeded after the first and second rounds.

First round Tuesday, February 28
8 | Detroit Mercy | 81
9 | Purdue Fort Wayne | 68
7 | Wright State | 77
10 | Green Bay | 57
6 | Robert Morris | 67
11 | IUPUI | 64

Quarterfinals; Thursday, March 2
1 | Youngstown State | 71
8 | Detroit Mercy | 66
4 | Northern Kentucky | 81
5 | Oakland | 74
2 | Milwaukee | 87
7 | Wright State | 70
3 | Cleveland State | 75*
6 | Robert Morris | 70

Semifinals; Monday, March 6
1 | Youngstown State | 63
4 | Northern Kentucky | 75
2 | Milwaukee | 80
3 | Cleveland State | 93

Championship; Tuesday, March 7
4 | Northern Kentucky | 63
3 | Cleveland State | 61

* denotes overtime period
