= 2022–23 Youngstown State Penguins men's basketball team =

American college basketball season

2022–23 Youngstown State Penguins men's basketball

Horizon League regular season champions

NIT, first round
- Conference: Horizon League
- Record: 24–10 (15–5 Horizon)
- Head coach: Jerrod Calhoun (6th season)
- Associate head coach: Ethan Faulkner
- Assistant coaches: Ben Asher; Mantoris Robinson
- Home arena: Beeghly Center

2022–23 Horizon League men's basketball standings
	Conf.				Overall
Team	W		L	PCT	W		L	PCT
Youngstown State	15	–	5	.750	24	–	10	.706
Milwaukee	14	–	6	.700	22	–	12	.647
Cleveland State	14	–	6	.700	21	–	14	.600
Northern Kentucky †	14	–	6	.700	22	–	13	.629
Oakland	11	–	9	.550	13	–	19	.406
Wright State	10	–	10	.500	18	–	15	.545
Robert Morris	10	–	10	.500	16	–	17	.485
Detroit Mercy	9	–	11	.450	14	–	19	.424
Purdue Fort Wayne	9	–	11	.450	17	–	15	.531
IUPUI	2	–	18	.100	5	–	27	.156
Green Bay	2	–	18	.100	3	–	29	.094
† 2023 Horizon League tournament winner

The 2022–23 Youngstown State Penguins men's basketball team represented Youngstown State University in the 2022–23 NCAA Division I men's basketball season. The Penguins, led by sixth-year head coach Jerrod Calhoun, played their home games at the Beeghly Center in Youngstown, Ohio as members of the Horizon League. They finished the regular season 23–8, 15–5 in Horizon League play, to finish in first place. They defeated Detroit Mercy in the quarterfinal round of the Horizon League tournament, before suffering an upset loss to eventual tournament winners Northern Kentucky in the semifinals. As the regular season leader who did not win their conference tournament, the Penguins received an auto-bid to play in the 2023 National Invitation Tournament, where they lost to Oklahoma State in the first round.

With a final record of 24–10, the 2022–23 season marked the Penguins' best season in Division I play.

== Previous season ==
The Penguins finished the 2021–22 season 19–15, 12–9 in Horizon League play, to finish in seventh place. They were defeated by Robert Morris in the first round of the Horizon League tournament. They received an invitation to The Basketball Classic, where they would defeat Morgan State in the first round, before falling to Fresno State in the quarterfinals.

== Roster ==
2022–23 Youngstown State Penguins men's basketball team
Players
Coaches

Pos.	#	Name	Height	Weight	Year	Previous school	Hometown
G	0	Brandon Rush	6 ft 3 in (1.91 m)	195 lb (88 kg)	Sr	Farleigh Dickinson	Warrensville Heights, OH
F	1	Adrian Nelson	6 ft 8 in (2.03 m)	225 lb (102 kg)	GS	Northern Kentucky	Pickerington, OH
F	2	Malek Green	6 ft 7 in (2.01 m)	220 lb (100 kg)	GS	Canisius	Cincinnati, OH
G	4	Bryce McBride	6 ft 2 in (1.88 m)	185 lb (84 kg)	Sr	Eastern Michigan	Jackson, TN
G	5	Dwayne Cohill	6 ft 2 in (1.88 m)	180 lb (82 kg)	Sr	Dayton	Cleveland, OH
G	10	John Jr. Lovelace	6 ft 7 in (2.01 m)	205 lb (93 kg)	Fr	We Are United Prep	Milwaukee, WI
F	11	William Dunn	6 ft 8 in (2.03 m)	220 lb (100 kg)	Jr	Quincy	Quincy, MI
G	15	Myles Hunter	6 ft 5 in (1.96 m)	208 lb (94 kg)	Jr	Carmel Christian	Charlotte, NC
G	22	Shemar Rathan-Mayes	5 ft 11 in (1.8 m)	180 lb (82 kg)	Jr	Orangeville Prep	Toronto, ON
F	23	Josh Irwin	6 ft 7 in (2.01 m)	240 lb (109 kg)	RS Fr	West Geauga	Mayfield Heights, OH
G	24	Chris Shelton	6 ft 4 in (1.93 m)	210 lb (95 kg)	Sr	Hampton	Richmond, VA
F	25	Jacori Owens	6 ft 9 in (2.06 m)	240 lb (109 kg)	So	Combine Academy	Charlotte, NC
G	32	Garrett Covington	6 ft 5 in (1.96 m)	215 lb (98 kg)	GS	Carmel	Carmel, IN

Head coach

- Jerrod Calhoun (Cincinnati)

Assistant coach(es)

- Ethan Faulkner (Northern Kentucky)
- Ben Asher (West Virginia)
- Mantoris Robinson (Winthrop)

Legend

- (C) Team captain
- (S) Suspended
- (I) Ineligible
- (W) Walk-on
- Injured
- Current redshirt

Roster
Last update: November 25, 2022

== Schedule and results ==
Date time, TV	Rank^{#}	Opponent^{#}	Result	Record	Site (attendance) city, state
Regular season
November 7, 2022*; 7:30 p.m., ESPN3		at Canisius	W 92–81	1–0	Koessler Athletic Center (1,391); Buffalo, NY
November 9, 2022*; 7:00 p.m., ESPN+		UT Martin	W 90–72	2–0	Beeghly Center (1,753); Youngstown, OH
November 13, 2022*; 4:00 p.m., ACCNX		at Notre Dame	L 81–88	2–1	Joyce Center (4,940); South Bend, IN
November 15, 2022*; 11:00 a.m., ESPN+		Grace Christian	W 96–68	3–1	Beeghly Center (4,451); Youngstown, OH
November 19, 2022*; 6:00 p.m.		vs. UC San Diego; Navy MTE	W 73–54	4–1	Alumni Hall (124); Annapolis, MD
November 20, 2022*; 2:00 p.m., ESPN+		at Navy; Navy MTE	L 67–80	4–2	Alumni Hall (664); Annapolis, MD
November 26, 2022*; 3:00 p.m.		at Western Illinois	W 88–64	5–2	Western Hall (431); Macomb, IL
December 1, 2022; 7:00 p.m., ESPN+		at Northern Kentucky	L 73–77 ^{2OT}	5–3 (0–1)	Truist Arena (2,421); Highland Heights, KY
December 4, 2022; 1:00 p.m., ESPN+		at Wright State	W 88–77	6–3 (1–1)	Nutter Center (3,205); Dayton, OH
December 8, 2022*; 7:00 p.m., ESPN+		Westminster (PA)	W 117–65	7–3	Beeghly Center (1,954); Youngstown, OH
December 11, 2022*; 2:00 p.m., ESPN+		Ohio	L 79–81	7–4	Beeghly Center (1,691); Youngstown, OH
December 16, 2022*; 8:00 p.m., ESPN+		Southern	W 85–81	8–4	Beeghly Center (2,544); Youngstown, OH
December 21, 2022*; 7:00 p.m., ESPN+		at Central Michigan	W 76–65	9–4	McGuirk Arena (1,251); Mount Pleasant, MI
December 29, 2022; 8:00 p.m., ESPN+		Cleveland State	W 85–71	10–4 (2–1)	Beeghly Center (3,031); Youngstown, OH
December 31, 2022; 2:45 p.m., ESPN+		Purdue Fort Wayne	L 71–76	10–5 (2–2)	Beeghly Center (1,953); Youngstown, OH
January 5, 2023; 7:00 p.m., ESPN+		Robert Morris	W 78–56	11–5 (3–2)	Beeghly Center (1,377); Youngstown, OH
January 7, 2023; 2:00 p.m., ESPN+		IUPUI	W 105–74	12–5 (4–2)	Beeghly Center (1,747); Youngstown, OH
January 12, 2023; 7:00 p.m., ESPN+		at Detroit Mercy	W 84–79	13–5 (5–2)	Calihan Hall (1,333); Detroit, MI
January 14, 2023; 3:00 p.m., ESPN+		at Oakland	W 85–69	14–5 (6–2)	Athletics Center O'rena (2,342); Auburn Hills, MI
January 19, 2023; 8:00 p.m., ESPN+		at Green Bay	W 86–70	15–5 (7–2)	Resch Center (1,261); Ashwaubenon, WI
January 21, 2023; 7:00 p.m., ESPN+		at Milwaukee	L 75–88	15–6 (7–3)	UW–Milwaukee Panther Arena (2,053); Milwaukee, WI
January 27, 2023; 7:00 p.m., ESPN+		Oakland	W 77–73	16–6 (8–3)	Beeghly Center (3,801); Youngstown, OH
January 29, 2023; 2:00 p.m., ESPN+		Detroit Mercy	W 73–63	17–6 (9–3)	Beeghly Center (4,187); Youngstown, OH
February 2, 2023; 7:00 p.m., ESPN+		Wright State	W 91–89 ^{3OT}	18–6 (10–3)	Beeghly Center (2,498); Youngstown, OH
February 4, 2023; 7:00 p.m., ESPN+		Northern Kentucky	W 74–56	19–6 (11–3)	Beeghly Center (3,531); Youngstown, OH
February 10, 2023; 7:00 p.m., ESPN+		at Purdue Fort Wayne	W 81–72	20–6 (12–3)	Memorial Coliseum (1,632); Fort Wayne, IN
February 12, 2023; 1:00 p.m., ESPN+		at Cleveland State	L 78–81	20–7 (12–4)	Wolstein Center (2,023); Cleveland, OH
February 16, 2023; 7:00 p.m., ESPN+		Milwaukee	W 87–58	21–7 (13–4)	Beeghly Center (4,425); Youngstown, OH
February 18, 2023; 2:00 p.m., ESPN+		Green Bay	W 95–65	22–7 (14–4)	Beeghly Center (3,283); Youngstown, OH
February 21, 2023; 7:00 p.m., ESPN+		at Robert Morris	L 64–83	22–8 (14–5)	UPMC Events Center (1,552); Moon Township, PA
February 25, 2023; 7:00 p.m., ESPN+		at IUPUI	W 93–79	23–8 (15–5)	The Jungle; Indianapolis, IN
Horizon League tournament
March 2, 2023; 7:00 p.m., ESPN+	(1)	(8) Detroit Mercy; Quarterfinals	W 71–66	24–8	Beeghly Center (5,584); Youngstown, OH
March 6, 2023; 7:00 p.m., ESPNU	(1)	vs. (4) Northern Kentucky; Semifinals	L 63–75	24–9	Indiana Farmers Coliseum; Indianapolis, IN
NIT
March 15, 2023; 7:00 p.m., ESPN+		(1) Oklahoma State; First round – Oklahoma State bracket	L 64–69	24–10	Beeghly Center (4,099); Youngstown, OH
*Non-conference game. ^{#}Rankings from AP poll. (#) Tournament seedings in parentheses. All times are in Eastern.
