= 2022–23 Milwaukee Panthers men's basketball team =

American college basketball season

2022–23 Milwaukee Panthers men's basketball

CBI, quarterfinals
- Conference: Horizon League
- Record: 22–12 (14–6 Horizon)
- Head coach: Bart Lundy (1st season)
- Assistant coaches: Jake Williams; Ben Walker; Jose Winston
- Home arena: UW–Milwaukee Panther Arena; Klotsche Center

2022–23 Horizon League men's basketball standings
	Conf.				Overall
Team	W		L	PCT	W		L	PCT
Youngstown State	15	–	5	.750	24	–	10	.706
Milwaukee	14	–	6	.700	22	–	12	.647
Cleveland State	14	–	6	.700	21	–	14	.600
Northern Kentucky †	14	–	6	.700	22	–	13	.629
Oakland	11	–	9	.550	13	–	19	.406
Wright State	10	–	10	.500	18	–	15	.545
Robert Morris	10	–	10	.500	16	–	17	.485
Detroit Mercy	9	–	11	.450	14	–	19	.424
Purdue Fort Wayne	9	–	11	.450	17	–	15	.531
IUPUI	2	–	18	.100	5	–	27	.156
Green Bay	2	–	18	.100	3	–	29	.094
† 2023 Horizon League tournament winner

The 2022–23 Milwaukee Panthers men's basketball team represented the University of Wisconsin–Milwaukee during the 2022–23 NCAA Division I men's basketball season. The Panthers, led by first-year head coach Bart Lundy, played their home games at the UW–Milwaukee Panther Arena as members of the Horizon League. They also played select games, including the Cream City Classic multi-team event, at the on-campus Klotsche Center.

They finished the season 20–10, 14–6 in Horizon League play to finish in a three-way tie for second place. They defeated Wright State in the quarterfinals of the Horizon League tournament to advance to the semifinals, where they lost to Cleveland State. The Panthers were invited to the CBI tournament, where they defeated Stetson in the opening round before falling to Charlotte in the quarterfinals.

== Previous season ==
The Panthers finished the 2021–22 season in ninth place in the Horizon League with a record of 10–22, including 8–14 in conference play. They lost in the opening round of the Horizon League tournament to eighth-seeded UIC.

== Offseason ==
=== Departures ===
Milwaukee departures
Name	Number	Pos.	Height	Weight	Year	Hometown	Reason for departure
Patrick Baldwin Jr.	23	F	6' 9"	220	Freshman	Sussex, WI	Declared for 2022 NBA draft Selected 28th overall by Golden State Warriors
Tyler Ellingson	14	G	6' 5"	180	RS Sophomore	Menomonee Falls, WI	Left team
Deandre Gholston	4	G	6' 5"	215	RS Senior	Gary, IN	Transferred to Missouri
Devon Hancock	1	G	6' 3"	190	RS Sophomore	Dallas, TX	Transferred to Louisiana-Monroe
Samba Kane	34	C	7' 0"	220	RS Junior	Dakar, Senegal	Left team
Jordan Lathon	2	G	6' 4"	200	RS Junior	Grandview, MO	Transferred to Morehead State
Donovan Newby	0	G	6' 1"	190	RS Freshman	Chicago Heights, IL	Transferred to UNC Wilmington
Nick Pappas	22	G	6' 3"	180	RS Sophomore	Phoenix, AZ	Left team
Kyle Ross	13	F	6' 6"	215	Freshman	St. John, IN	Left team
Tafari Simms	21	F	6' 7"	212	RS Senior	Hamilton, ON	Transferred to Western Michigan
Jasin Sinani	3	G	6' 3"	193	Freshman	Oak Creek, WI	Transferred to Campbell
Joey St. Pierre	44	C	6' 10"	275	RS Senior	Spring Grove, IL	Transferred to Portland
Josh Thomas	24	G	6' 4"	205	RS Senior	Chicago, IL	Graduated

=== Incoming transfers ===
Milwaukee incoming transfers
Name	Number	Pos.	Height	Weight	Year	Hometown	Previous school
Keon Edwards	25	G	6' 8"	210	Sophomore	Houston, TX	Nebraska
BJ Freeman	10	G/F	6' 6"	200	Sophomore	Selma, NC	Dodge City CC
Dominic Ham	22	G	6' 5"	195	Junior	Atlanta, GA	Georgia Highlands
Jalen Johnson	24	F	6' 7"	230	RS Junior	Indianapolis, IN	Alabama A&M
Kentrell Pullian	12	G	6' 0"	182	Sophomore	Benton Harbor, MI	Eastern New Mexico
Ahmad Rand	23	F	6' 8"	195	Senior	Lincolnton, GA	Oregon State
Jordan Ratliffe	4	G	5' 10"	189	RS Senior	Gibson, NC	UNC Pembroke
Angelo Stuart	5	G	6' 1"	175	RS Junior	Queens, NY	Hutchinson CC
Justin Thomas	25	G	6' 7"	179	Sophomore	Baton Rouge, LA	Navarro

=== 2022 recruiting class ===
College recruiting information
Name	Hometown	School	Height	Weight	Commit date
Zach Howell; SF	Springfield, MO	Springfield Catholic	6 ft 5 in (1.96 m)	175 lb (79 kg)	May 23, 2022
Zach Howell; SF	Recruit ratings: No ratings found				
Elijah Jamison; PG	Louisburg, NC	Liberty Heights	6 ft 2 in (1.88 m)	190 lb (86 kg)	May 12, 2022
Elijah Jamison; PG	Recruit ratings: Rivals:				
Brian Taylor II; PG	St. Louis, MO	DeSmet	6 ft 3 in (1.91 m)	170 lb (77 kg)	Sep 9, 2021
Brian Taylor II; PG	Recruit ratings: 247Sports:				
Overall recruit ranking:
Note: In many cases, Scout, Rivals, 247Sports, On3, and ESPN may conflict in their listings of height and weight.; In these cases, the average was taken. ESPN grades are on a 100-point scale.; Sources: "2022 Team Ranking". Rivals.

== Preseason ==
The Panthers were picked to finish in ninth place in the Horizon League in the coaches' poll, receiving a total of 132 points.

== Roster ==
2022–23 Milwaukee Panthers men's basketball team
Players
Coaches

Pos.	#	Name	Height	Weight	Year	Previous school	Hometown
G	0	Brian II Taylor	6 ft 4 in (1.93 m)	184 lb (83 kg)	Fr	De Smet Jesuit	St. Louis, MO
G	5	Markeith Browning II	6 ft 4 in (1.93 m)	196 lb (89 kg)	RS So	Coffeyville CC	Ypsilanti, MI
G	2	Elijah Jamison	6 ft 3 in (1.91 m)	196 lb (89 kg)	Fr	Liberty Heights	Louisburg, NC
G	3	Zach Howell	6 ft 5 in (1.96 m)	200 lb (91 kg)	Fr	Springfield Catholic	Springfield, MO
G	4	Jordan Ratliffe	5 ft 10 in (1.78 m)	189 lb (86 kg)	RS Sr	UNC Pembroke	Gibson, NC
G	5	Angelo Stuart	6 ft 1 in (1.85 m)	175 lb (79 kg)	RS Jr	Hutchinson CC	Queens, NY
G/F	10	BJ Freeman	6 ft 6 in (1.98 m)	200 lb (91 kg)	So	Dodge City CC	Selma, NC
G/F	11	Vin Jr. Baker	6 ft 9 in (2.06 m)	190 lb (86 kg)	RS Sr	Boston College	Old Saybrook, CT
F	12	Kentrell Pullian	6 ft 0 in (1.83 m)	180 lb (82 kg)	So	Eastern New Mexico	Benton Harbor, MI
F	20	Vincent Miszkiewicz	6 ft 7 in (2.01 m)	210 lb (95 kg)	RS So	Purdue NW	Elgin, IL
F	21	Vinko Polovic (W)	6 ft 7 in (2.01 m)	205 lb (93 kg)	Fr	Bosco Institute	Milwaukee, WI
G	22	Dominic Ham (W)	6 ft 5 in (1.96 m)	195 lb (88 kg)	Jr	Georgia Highlands	Atlanta, GA
F	23	Ahmad Rand (W)	6 ft 8 in (2.03 m)	195 lb (88 kg)	Sr	Oregon State	Lincolnton, GA
F	24	Jalen Johnson	6 ft 7 in (2.01 m)	230 lb (104 kg)	RS Jr	Alabama A&M	Indianapolis, IN
G	25	Justin Thomas	6 ft 7 in (2.01 m)	179 lb (81 kg)	So	Navarro	Baton Rouge, LA
C	33	Moses Bol	7 ft 1 in (2.16 m)	225 lb (102 kg)	RS Sr	UCF	Wau, South Sudan
G	35	Keon Edwards	6 ft 8 in (2.03 m)	210 lb (95 kg)	So	Nebraska	Houston, TX

Head coach

- Bart Lundy (Lenoir–Rhyne)

Assistant coach(es)

- Jake Williams (Middle Tennessee)
- Ben Walker (Creighton)
- Jose Winston (Milwaukee)

Legend

- (C) Team captain
- (S) Suspended
- (I) Ineligible
- (W) Walk-on
- Injured
- Current redshirt

Roster
Last update: November 1, 2022

== Schedule and results ==
Date time, TV	Rank^{#}	Opponent^{#}	Result	Record	High points	High rebounds	High assists	Site (attendance) city, state
Regular season
November 7, 2022*; 5:00 p.m., ESPN+		MSOE	W 102–46	1–0	24 – Stuart	8 – Pullian	5 – Stuart	Klotsche Center; Milwaukee, WI
November 8, 2022*; 5:30 p.m., BTN		at Purdue	L 53–84	1–1	19 – Freeman	5 – Jamison	3 – Jamison	Mackey Arena (14,876); West Lafayette, IN
November 12, 2022*; 6:00 p.m., ESPN+		Cardinal Stritch	W 112–38	2–1	18 – Stuart	8 – Pullian	5 – Browning II	UWM Panther Arena (2,010); Milwaukee, WI
November 20, 2022*; 5:00 p.m., ESPN+		at Iowa State	L 53–68	2–2	11 – Freeman	8 – Thomas	2 – Browning II	Hilton Coliseum (11,785); Ames, IA
November 23, 2022*; 2:00 p.m., ESPN+		St. Thomas	L 72–76	2–3	18 – Rand	8 – Rand	4 – Browning II	UWM Panther Arena (1,813); Milwaukee, WI
November 26, 2022*; 4:00 p.m., ESPN+		UC Davis; Cream City Classic	W 87–85	3–3	20 – Pullian	9 – Pullian	3 – 3 tied	Klotsche Center (1,242); Milwaukee, WI
November 27, 2022*; 3:00 p.m., ESPN+		Boston University; Cream City Classic	W 67–46	4–3	12 – Rand	7 – Freeman	3 – Thomas	Klotsche Center (1,283); Milwaukee, WI
November 28, 2022*; 7:00 p.m., ESPN+		Southeast Missouri State; Cream City Classic	W 84–68	5–3	23 – Freeman	13 – Thomas	4 – Thomas	Klotsche Center (1,183); Milwaukee, WI
December 1, 2022; 7:00 p.m., ESPN+		at Green Bay	W 81–67	6–3 (1–0)	13 – Rand	6 – Rand	4 – Thomas	Resch Center (1,217); Green Bay, WI
December 3, 2022; 7:00 p.m., ESPN+		IUPUI	W 74–61	7–3 (2–0)	18 – Pullian	6 – 2 tied	6 – Thomas	UWM Panther Arena (1,322); Milwaukee, WI
December 6, 2022*; 6:00 p.m., ESPN+		at Chattanooga	L 76–88	7–4 (2–0)	24 – Pullian	9 – Pullian	4 – Browning II	McKenzie Arena (2,658); Chattanooga, TN
December 11, 2022*; 2:00 p.m., ESPN+		North Park	W 92–63	8–4	19 – Jamison	7 – Rand	6 – Jamison	UWM Panther Arena (1,141); Milwaukee, WI
December 22, 2022*; 6:00 p.m., ESPN+		at Rhode Island	Cancelled due to a COVID-19 outbreak among Rhode Island players					Ryan Center; Kingston, RI
December 29, 2022; 6:00 p.m., ESPN+		at Oakland	L 61–83	8–5 (2–1)	12 – Rand	7 – Browning II	4 – Browning II	Athletics Center O'rena (2,063); Auburn Hills, MI
December 31, 2022; 11:00 a.m., ESPN+		at Detroit Mercy	W 84–81	9–5 (3–1)	23 – Freeman	7 – Pullian	4 – Browning II	Calihan Hall (1,533); Detroit, MI
January 5, 2023; 6:00 p.m.		at Cleveland State	W 68–64 ^{OT}	10–5 (4–1)	24 – Freeman	7 – Pullian	4 – Browning II	Wolstein Center (1,541); Cleveland, OH
January 7, 2023; 12:00 p.m., ESPN+		at Purdue Fort Wayne	W 74–70	11–5 (5–1)	19 – Pullian	7 – 2 tied	5 – Browning II	Hilliard Gates Sports Center (1,552); Fort Wayne, IN
January 12, 2023; 7:00 p.m., ESPN+		Northern Kentucky	W 80–75	12–5 (6–1)	28 – Freeman	8 – Pullian	8 – Thomas	UWM Panther Arena (1,598); Milwaukee, WI
January 14, 2023; 6:00 p.m., ESPN+		Wright State	L 74–78 ^{OT}	12–6 (6–2)	20 – Freeman	9 – Freeman	2 – 2 tied	UWM Panther Arena (1,892); Milwaukee, WI
January 19, 2023; 7:00 p.m., ESPN+		Robert Morris	W 77–69	13–6 (7–2)	26 – Freeman	7 – Freeman	6 – Jamison	UWM Panther Arena (1,305); Milwaukee, WI
January 21, 2023; 6:00 p.m., ESPN+		Youngstown State	W 88—75	14–6 (8–2)	30 – Freeman	8 – Browning II	11 – Freeman	UWM Panther Arena (2,053); Milwaukee, WI
January 26, 2023; 6:00 p.m., ESPN+		at Wright State	L 86–93	14–7 (8–3)	26 – Freeman	7 – Browning II	4 – Thomas	Nutter Center (3,448); Fairborn, OH
January 28, 2023; 3:00 p.m., BSOH		at Northern Kentucky	W 75–74	15–7 (9–3)	23 – Freeman	4 – 2 tied	9 – Freeman	Truist Arena (4,466); Highland Heights, KY
February 2, 2023; 10:00 a.m., ESPN+		at IUPUI	W 72–69	16–7 (10–3)	12 – Pullian	7 – Freeman	3 – 4 tied	Indiana Farmers Coliseum (1,607); Indianapolis, IN
February 6, 2023; 7:00 p.m., ESPN+		Green Bay	L 79–80 ^{OT}	16–8 (10–4)	28 – Freeman	12 – Browning II	5 – Freeman	UWM Panther Arena (2,419); Milwaukee, WI
February 9, 2023; 7:00 p.m., ESPN+		Detroit Mercy	W 94–89	17–8 (11–4)	26 – Freeman	8 – Rand	10 – Freeman	UWM Panther Arena (1,768); Milwaukee, WI
February 11, 2023; 6:00 p.m., ESPN+		Oakland	W 80–77 ^{OT}	18–8 (12–4)	16 – 2 tied	9 – Thomas	6 – Thomas	UWM Panther Arena (1,807); Milwaukee, WI
February 16, 2023; 6:00 p.m., ESPN+		at Youngstown State	L 58–87	18–9 (12–5)	12 – Jamison	4 – 4 tied	3 – 2 tied	Beeghly Center (4,425); Youngstown, OH
February 18, 2023; 6:00 p.m., ESPN+		at Robert Morris	L 60–80	18–10 (12–6)	13 – Jamison	5 – Freeman	3 – Thomas	UPMC Events Center (1,612); Moon Township, PA
February 23, 2023; 7:30 p.m., ESPN+		Purdue Fort Wayne	W 96–94	19–10 (13–6)	25 – Pullian	12 – Freeman	11 – Freeman	Klotsche Center (1,790); Milwaukee, WI
February 25, 2023; 7:00 p.m., ESPN+		Cleveland State	W 81–72	20–10 (14–6)	31 – Freeman	11 – Rand	4 – Thomas	UWM Panther Arena (3,334); Milwaukee, WI
Horizon League tournament
March 2, 2023; 7:00 p.m., ESPN+	(2)	(7) Wright State; Quarterfinals	W 87–70	21–10	29 – Freeman	11 – Rand	3 – 3 tied	Klotsche Center (2,951); Milwaukee, WI
March 6, 2023; 8:30 p.m., ESPN2	(2)	vs. (3) Cleveland State; Semifinals	L 80–93	21–11	24 – Johnson	9 – Rand	4 – 2 tied	Indiana Farmers Coliseum; Indianapolis, IN
College Basketball Invitational
March 19, 2023; 6:30 p.m., FloHoops	(11)	vs. (6) Stetson; First round	W 87–83 ^{OT}	22–11	43 – Freeman	9 – Thomas	4 – Pullian	Ocean Center (922); Daytona Beach, FL
March 20, 2023; 5:30 p.m., FloHoops	(11)	vs. (3) Charlotte; Quarterfinals	L 65–76	22–12	15 – Freeman	6 – Browning II	3 – Thomas	Ocean Center (764); Daytona Beach, FL
*Non-conference game. ^{#}Rankings from AP poll. (#) Tournament seedings in parentheses. All times are in Central.
