= 2022–23 Northern Kentucky Norse men's basketball team =

American college basketball season

2022–23 Northern Kentucky Norse men's basketball
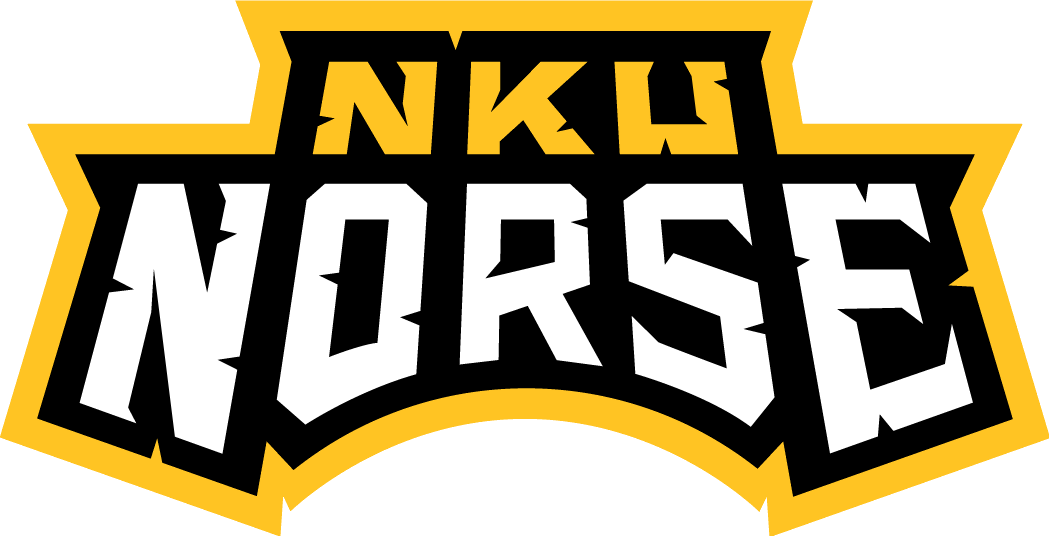

Horizon League tournament champions

NCAA tournament, First Round
- Conference: Horizon League
- Record: 22–13 (14–6 Horizon)
- Head coach: Darrin Horn (4th season)
- Assistant coaches: David Harris; Eric Haut; Simon McCormack
- Home arena: Truist Arena

2022–23 Horizon League men's basketball standings
	Conf.				Overall
Team	W		L	PCT	W		L	PCT
Youngstown State	15	–	5	.750	24	–	10	.706
Milwaukee	14	–	6	.700	22	–	12	.647
Cleveland State	14	–	6	.700	21	–	14	.600
Northern Kentucky †	14	–	6	.700	22	–	13	.629
Oakland	11	–	9	.550	13	–	19	.406
Wright State	10	–	10	.500	18	–	15	.545
Robert Morris	10	–	10	.500	16	–	17	.485
Detroit Mercy	9	–	11	.450	14	–	19	.424
Purdue Fort Wayne	9	–	11	.450	17	–	15	.531
IUPUI	2	–	18	.100	5	–	27	.156
Green Bay	2	–	18	.100	3	–	29	.094
† 2023 Horizon League tournament winner

The 2022–23 Northern Kentucky Norse men's basketball team represented Northern Kentucky University in the 2022–23 NCAA Division I men's basketball season. The Norse were led by fourth-year head coach Darrin Horn, and played their home games at Truist Arena in Highland Heights, Kentucky as members of the Horizon League. They finished the season 19–12, 14–6 in Horizon League play to finish in a three-way tie for second place. They defeated Oakland, Youngstown State, and Cleveland State to claim the title championship of the Horizon League tournament. They received the Horizon League's automatic bid to the NCAA tournament, where they lost in the first round to top-seeded Houston, closing their season with an overall record of 22–13.

== Previous season ==
The Norse finished the 2021–22 season 20–12, 14–6 in Horizon League play to finish in third place. In the Horizon League tournament, they defeated Detroit Mercy and Purdue Fort Wayne, before falling to Wright State in the championship game.

== Roster ==
2022–23 Northern Kentucky Norse men's basketball team
Players
Coaches

Pos.	#	Name	Height	Weight	Year	Previous school	Hometown
G	0	Isaiah Mason	6 ft 4 in (1.93 m)	175 lb (79 kg)	So	Bowling Green High School	Bowling Green, Kentucky
G	1	Trey Robinson	6 ft 6 in (1.98 m)	220 lb (100 kg)	Jr	Hamilton High School	Hamilton, Ohio
G	2	Sam Vinson	6 ft 5 in (1.96 m)	205 lb (93 kg)	So	Highlands High School	Fort Thomas, Kentucky
G	3	Marques Warrick	6 ft 2 in (1.88 m)	185 lb (84 kg)	Jr	Henry Clay High School	Lexington, Kentucky
G	4	A'lahn Sumler	6 ft 3 in (1.91 m)	185 lb (84 kg)	Fr	Buford High School	Waterbury, Connecticut
F	5	LJ Wells	6 ft 8 in (2.03 m)	205 lb (93 kg)	Fr	Eau Claire Memorial High School	Eau Claire, Wisconsin
C	10	Imanuel Zorgvol	7 ft 0 in (2.13 m)	215 lb (98 kg)	RS Fr	Central Florida Christian Academy	Paramaribo, Suriname
G	11	Xavier Rhodes	6 ft 1 in (1.85 m)	170 lb (77 kg)	Sr	Florida Southern College	Lee's Summit, Missouri
G	12	Mitchel Minor	5 ft 10 in (1.78 m)	175 lb (79 kg)	Fr	Scott High School	Taylor Mill, Kentucky
G	13	Cole Sherman	5 ft 11 in (1.8 m)	190 lb (86 kg)	Fr	St. Xavier High School	Louisville, Kentucky
F	15	Cesar Tchilombo	6 ft 9 in (2.06 m)	205 lb (93 kg)	Fr	The John Carroll School	Goma, DR Congo
F	21	Chris Brandon	6 ft 8 in (2.03 m)	220 lb (100 kg)	Sr	Detroit Mercy	Houston, Texas
G	22	Trevon Faulkner	6 ft 4 in (1.93 m)	200 lb (91 kg)	Sr	Mercer County High School	Harrodsburg, Kentucky
G	24	Jake Evans	6 ft 1 in (1.85 m)	190 lb (86 kg)	Jr	Male High School	Louisville, Kentucky
G	34	Hubertas Pivorius	6 ft 2 in (1.88 m)	170 lb (77 kg)	So	Christopher Columbus High School	Vilnius, Lithuania
C	42	Noah Hupmann	7 ft 1 in (2.16 m)	225 lb (102 kg)	Jr	Covington Catholic High School	Union, Kentucky

Head coach

- Darrin Horn (Western Kentucky)

Assistant coach(es)

- David Harris (Ashland)
- Eric Haut (Kent State)
- Simon McCormack (American)

Legend

- (C) Team captain
- (S) Suspended
- (I) Ineligible
- (W) Walk-on
- Injured
- Current redshirt

Roster
Last update: December 16, 2022

== Schedule and results ==
Date time, TV	Rank^{#}	Opponent^{#}	Result	Record	Site (attendance) city, state
Exhibition
October 24, 2022*; 7:30 pm		Tiffin	W 83–55	–	Truist Arena; Highland Heights, KY
November 1, 2022*; 7:30 pm		at Transylvania	W 78–55	–	Clive M. Beck Center; Lexington, KY
Regular season
November 7, 2022*; 7:00 pm, BSOH/ESPN+		Kent State	L 57–79	0–1	Truist Arena (2,785); Highland Heights, KY
November 12, 2022*; 2:00 pm, ESPN+		UC Clermont	W 89–49	1–1	Truist Arena (2,504); Highland Heights, KY
November 16, 2022*; 7:00 pm, ESPN+		Cincinnati	W 64–51	2–1	Truist Arena (8,503); Highland Heights, KY
November 21, 2022*; 7:30 pm, FloHoops		vs. Florida Gulf Coast; Gulf Coast Showcase First Round	L 61–82	2–2	Hertz Arena (1,023); Estero, FL
November 22, 2022*; 1:30 pm, FloHoops		vs. UT Arlington; Gulf Coast Showcase Consolation 2nd Round	L 56–60	2–3	Hertz Arena (243); Estero, FL
November 23, 2022*; 11:00 am, FloHoops		vs. Toledo; Gulf Coast Showcase 7th place game	L 69–82	2–4	Hertz Arena (142); Estero, FL
November 27, 2022*; 2:00 pm, ESPN+		Tennessee Tech	W 85–77 ^{2OT}	3–4	Truist Arena (2,267); Highland Heights, KY
December 1, 2022; 7:00 pm, BSOH/ESPN+		Youngstown State	W 77–73 ^{2OT}	4–4 (1–0)	Truist Arena (2,421); Highland Heights, KY
December 3, 2022; 6:00 pm, ESPN+		Robert Morris	W 60–56	5–4 (2–0)	Truist Arena (2,351); Highland Heights, KY
December 7, 2022*; 9:00 pm, P12N		at Washington State	L 47–68	5–5	Beasley Coliseum (2,268); Pullman, WA
December 14, 2022*; 7:00 pm, ESPN+		Eastern Kentucky	W 64–61	6–5	Truist Arena (2,854); Highland Heights, KY
December 18, 2022*; 2:00 pm, ESPN+		Miami Hamilton	W 81–41	7–5	Truist Arena (2,294); Highland Heights, KY
December 21, 2022*; 7:00 pm, CUSA.tv		at Florida Atlantic	L 52–67	7–6	Eleanor R. Baldwin Arena (1,448); Boca Raton, FL
December 29, 2022; 7:00 pm, ESPN+		Wright State	W 78–64	8–6 (3–0)	Truist Arena (3,669); Highland Heights, KY
December 31, 2022; 2:00 pm, ESPN+		at IUPUI	W 55–42	9–6 (4–0)	Indiana Farmers Coliseum (710); Indianapolis, IN
January 6, 2023; 7:00 pm, ESPN+		Oakland	L 63–64	9–7 (4–1)	Truist Arena (2,575); Highland Heights, KY
January 8, 2023; 2:00 pm, ESPN+		Detroit Mercy	W 78–76 ^{OT}	10–7 (5–1)	Truist Arena (2,480); Highland Heights, KY
January 12, 2023; 8:00 pm, ESPN+		at Milwaukee	L 75–80	10–8 (5–2)	UW–Milwaukee Panther Arena (1,598); Milwaukee, WI
January 14, 2023; 7:00 pm, ESPN+		at Green Bay	W 74–53	11–8 (6–2)	Resch Center (1,624); Ashwaubenon, WI
January 19, 2023; 7:00 pm, ESPN+		Cleveland State	W 57–56	12–8 (7–2)	Truist Arena (2,682); Highland Heights, KY
January 21, 2023; 6:00 pm, ESPN+		Purdue Fort Wayne	W 74–54	13–8 (8–2)	Truist Arena (2,872); Highland Heights, KY
January 26, 2023; 7:00 pm, ESPN+		Green Bay	W 68–50	14–8 (9–2)	Truist Arena (2,622); Highland Heights, KY
January 28, 2023; 4:00 pm, BSOH/ESPN+		Milwaukee	L 74–75	14–9 (9–3)	Truist Arena (4,466); Highland Heights, KY
February 2, 2023; 7:00 pm, ESPN+		at Robert Morris	W 65–52	15–9 (10–3)	UPMC Events Center (1,147); Moon Township, PA
February 4, 2023; 7:00 pm, ESPN+		at Youngstown State	L 56–74	15–10 (10–4)	Beeghly Center (3,531); Youngstown, OH
February 10, 2023; 7:00 pm, ESPN+		at Wright State	L 65–83	15–11 (10–5)	Nutter Center (5,659); Dayton, OH
February 12, 2023; 1:00 pm, BSOH/ESPN+		IUPUI	W 86–47	16–11 (11–5)	Truist Arena (2,554); Highland Heights, KY
February 17, 2023; 7:00 pm, ESPN+		at Purdue Fort Wayne	W 63–50	17–11 (12–5)	Memorial Coliseum (1,978); Fort Wayne, IN
February 19, 2023; 3:00 pm, ESPN+		at Cleveland State	L 63–64	17–12 (12–6)	Wolstein Center (1,805); Cleveland, OH
February 23, 2023; 7:00 pm, ESPN+		at Detroit Mercy	W 67–64	18–12 (13–6)	Calihan Hall (1,335); Detroit, MI
February 25, 2023; 3:00 pm, ESPN+		at Oakland	W 78–69	19–12 (14–6)	Athletics Center O'rena; Auburn Hills, MI
Horizon League tournament
March 2, 2023; 7:00 pm, ESPN+	(4)	(5) Oakland; Quarterfinals	W 81–74	20–12	Truist Arena (2,672); Highland Heights, KY
March 6, 2023; 7:00 pm, ESPNU	(4)	vs. (1) Youngstown State; Semifinals	W 75–63	21–12	Indiana Farmers Coliseum; Indianapolis, IN
March 7, 2023; 7:00 pm, ESPN	(4)	vs. (3) Cleveland State; Championship	W 63–61	22–12	Indiana Farmers Coliseum; Indianapolis, IN
NCAA tournament
Mar 16, 2023*; 9:20 pm, TNT	(16 MW)	vs. (1 MW) No. 2 Houston; First Round	L 52–63	22–13	Legacy Arena (15,154); Birmingham, AL
*Non-conference game. ^{#}Rankings from AP Poll. (#) Tournament seedings in parentheses. All times are in Eastern.
