= 2022–23 Horizon League men's basketball season =

- League: NCAA Division I
- Sport: Men's basketball
- Number of teams: 11
- TV partner(s): ESPN+ ESPN2; ESPNU; ESPN

Regular season
- Season champions: Youngstown State
- Season MVP: Antoine Davis, Detroit Mercy

Tournament
- Champions: Northern Kentucky
- Runners-up: Cleveland State
- Finals MVP: Marques Warrick, Northern Kentucky

Basketball seasons
- ← 2021–22 2023–24 →

2022–23 Horizon League men's basketball standings
	Conf.				Overall
Team	W		L	PCT	W		L	PCT
Youngstown State	15	–	5	.750	24	–	10	.706
Milwaukee	14	–	6	.700	22	–	12	.647
Cleveland State	14	–	6	.700	21	–	14	.600
Northern Kentucky †	14	–	6	.700	22	–	13	.629
Oakland	11	–	9	.550	13	–	19	.406
Wright State	10	–	10	.500	18	–	15	.545
Robert Morris	10	–	10	.500	16	–	17	.485
Detroit Mercy	9	–	11	.450	14	–	19	.424
Purdue Fort Wayne	9	–	11	.450	17	–	15	.531
IUPUI	2	–	18	.100	5	–	27	.156
Green Bay	2	–	18	.100	3	–	29	.094
† 2023 Horizon League tournament winner

The 2022–23 Horizon League men's basketball season began with practices in September 2022 and ended with the 2023 Horizon League men's basketball tournament in March 2023. This wase the 43rd season for Horizon League men's basketball. This was the first season in conference history with 11 teams, as UIC departed for the Missouri Valley Conference following the 2021-22 season.

== Head coaches ==
=== Coaching changes ===
- On March 2, 2022, Milwaukee fired head coach Pat Baldwin after five seasons with the team. On March 18, the Panthers hired Division II Queens head coach Bart Lundy to be their next head coach.
- On March 22, 2022, Cleveland State head coach Dennis Gates left the team to become the head coach at Missouri. On April 5, the Vikings hired Iowa State assistant coach Daniyal Robinson to be their next head coach.
- On January 31, 2023, Green Bay fired head coach Will Ryan after three seasons and a 2–19 start. Assistant coach Freddie Owens was named interim head coach.

=== Coaches ===
Team	Head coach	Previous job	Years at school	Overall record	Horizon record	NCAA Tournaments
Cleveland State	Daniyal Robinson	Iowa State (asst.)	1	0–0 (.000)	0–0 (.000)	0
Detroit Mercy	Mike Davis	Texas Southern	5	45–69 (.395)	34–35 (.493)	0
Green Bay	Will Ryan	Wheeling	3	13–42 (.236)	12–28 (.300)	0
Green Bay	Freddie Owens (interim)	Green Bay (asst.)	1	0–0 (.000)	0–0 (.000)	0
IUPUI	Matt Crenshaw	Ball State (asst.)	2	3–26 (.103)	1–16 (.059)	0
Milwaukee	Bart Lundy	Queens	1	0–0 (.000)	0–0 (.000)	0
Northern Kentucky	Darrin Horn	Texas (asst.)	4	57–32 (.640)	38–18 (.679)	1
Oakland	Greg Kampe	Toledo (asst.)	38	657–495 (.570)	91–58 (.611)	0
Purdue Fort Wayne	Jon Coffman	IPFW (asst.)	9	138–113 (.550)	72–64 (.529)	0
Robert Morris	Andrew Toole	Robert Morris (asst.)	13	200–193 (.509)	123–91 (.575)	2
Wright State	Scott Nagy	South Dakota State	7	131–63 (.675)	84–30 (.737)	2
Youngstown State	Jerrod Calhoun	Fairmont State	6	71–85 (.465)	45–50 (.474)	0

Notes:

- Year at school includes 2022–23 season.
- Records are prior to 2022–23 season.

== Preseason ==
=== Preseason coaches poll ===
2022-23 Horizon League Preseason Coaches Poll
Rank	Team (First Place Votes)	Points
T1.	Purdue Fort Wayne (17)	394
T1.	Northern Kentucky (15)	394
3.	Wright State (3)	329
4.	Oakland (2)	321
5.	Youngstown State (1)	291
6.	Detroit Mercy (2)	268
7.	Cleveland State	188
8.	Robert Morris	163
8.	Milwaukee	132
10.	Green Bay	111
11.	IUPUI	49

=== Preseason All-Horizon League ===
First team	Second team
Antoine Davis, Detroit Mercy	Trevon Faulkner, Northern Kentucky
Marques Warrick, Northern Kentucky	Sam Vinson, Northern Kentucky
Jalen Moore, Oakland	Kahliel Spear, Robert Morris
Jarred Godfrey, Purdue Fort Wayne	Trey Calvin, Wright State
Dwayne Cohill, Youngstown State	Amari Davis, Wright State

Preseason Player of the Year: Antoine Davis, Detroit Mercy

== Regular season ==
=== Player of the Week awards ===
Week	Player of the Week	Freshman of the Week
1	Trey Calvin, Wright State	John Lovelace, Jr., Youngstown State
2	Marques Warrick, Northern Kentucky	Vincent Brady II, IUPUI
3	Marques Warrick (2), Northern Kentucky	Brandon Noel, Wright State
4	Dwayne Cohill, Youngstown State	Isaiah Jones, Detroit Mercy
5	Antoine Davis, Detroit Mercy	Vincent Brady II (2), IUPUI
6	Dwayne Cohill (2), Youngstown State	A'lahn Sumler, Northern Kentucky
7	Trey Calvin (2), Wright State	Armon Jarrard, IUPUI
7	Dwayne Cohill (3), Youngstown State	Armon Jarrard, IUPUI
8	Jalen Moore, Oakland	Vincent Brady II (3), IUPUI
9	BJ Freeman, Milwaukee	Brandon Noel (2), Wright State
10	Antoine Davis (2), Detroit Mercy	Brandon Noel (3), Wright State
11	Antoine Davis (3), Detroit Mercy	Vincent Brady II (4), IUPUI
11	BJ Freeman (2), Milwaukee	Vincent Brady II (4), IUPUI
12	Kahleil Spear, Robert Morris	Armon Jarrard (2), IUPUI
13	Antoine Davis (4), Detroit Mercy	DJ Jackson, IUPUI
14	Antoine Davis (5), Detroit Mercy	Brandon Noel (4), Wright State
15	Antoine Davis (6), Detroit Mercy	DJ Jackson (2), IUPUI

School	POTW	FOTW
Cleveland State	0	0
Detroit Mercy	6	1
Green Bay	0	0
IUPUI	0	8
Milwaukee	2	0
Northern Kentucky	2	1
Oakland	1	0
Purdue Fort Wayne	0	0
Robert Morris	0	0
Wright State	2	4
Youngstown State	3	1

=== Conference matrix ===
	CSU	DET	GB	IUPUI	MKE	NKU	OAK	PFW	RMU	WSU	YSU
vs. Cleveland State	–	1–1	0–2	0–2	2–0	1–1	1–1	0–2	0–2	0–2	1–1
vs. Detroit Mercy	1–1	–	0–2	0–2	2–0	2–0	1–1	0–2	0–2	0–2	1–1
vs. Green Bay	2–0	2–0	–	1–1	1–1	2–0	2–0	2–0	2–0	2–0	2–0
vs. IUPUI	2–0	2–0	1–1	–	2–0	2–0	2–0	2–0	1–1	2–0	2–0
vs. Milwaukee	0–0	0–0	1–1	0–0	–	0–2	1–1	0–2	1–1	2–0	1–1
vs. Northern Kentucky	1–1	0–2	0–2	0–2	2–0	–	1–1	0–2	0–2	1–1	1–1
vs. Oakland	1–1	1–1	0–2	0–2	1–1	1–1	–	2–0	1–1	0–2	2–0
vs. Purdue Fort Wayne	2–0	2–0	0–2	0–2	2–0	2–0	0–2	–	2–0	0–2	1–1
vs. Robert Morris	2–0	1–1	0–2	1–1	1–1	2–0	1–1	0–2	–	1–1	1–1
vs. Wright State	2–0	0–2	0–2	0–2	0–2	1–1	2–0	2–0	1–1	–	2–0
vs. Youngstown State	1–1	0–2	0–2	0–2	1–1	1–1	0–2	1–1	1–1	0–2	–
Total	14–6	9–11	2–18	2–18	14–6	14–6	11–9	9–11	10–10	10–10	15–5

=== Early season tournaments ===
The following table summarizes the multiple-team events (MTE) or early season tournaments in which teams from the Horizon League will participate.

Team	Tournament	Location	Dates	Finish
Cleveland State	Turkey Slam – Cleveland State Regional	Cleveland, OH	November 16–23	N/A
Detroit Mercy	Paradise Invitational	Boca Raton, FL	November 17–21	3rd
Green Bay	Jamaica Classic	Montego Bay, Jamaica	November 18–20	4th
IUPUI	Big Easy Classic	New Orleans, LA	November 23–25	4th
Milwaukee	Cream City Classic	Milwaukee, WI	November 26–28	1st
Northern Kentucky	Gulf Coast Showcase	Estero, FL	November 21–23	8th
Oakland	Nassau Championship	Nassau, Bahamas	November 25–27	8th
Purdue Fort Wayne	Cancún Challenge	Campus sites Cancún, Mexico	November 15–23	2nd
Robert Morris	Hostilo Hoops Community Classic	Savannah, GA	November 21–22	4th
Wright State	Vegas 4	Henderson, NV	November 21–23	2nd
Youngstown State	Navy MTE	Annapolis, MD	November 18–20	2nd

== Postseason ==
=== Horizon League tournament ===
The conference tournament will be played from February 28 to March 6, 2023. The first round and quarterfinals are hosted at campus sites, while the semifinals and finals are held at Indiana Farmers Coliseum in Indianapolis, Indiana. Teams are seeded by conference record, with ties broken by record between the tied teams followed by record against the regular-season champion, if necessary. The top five teams receive a bye to the quarterfinals and the bracket is re-seeded after every round.

The Horizon League does not use a fixed bracket tournament system, and pairings are re-seeded after the first and second rounds.

First round Tuesday, February 28
8	Detroit Mercy	81
9	Purdue Fort Wayne	68
7	Wright State	77
10	Green Bay	57
6	Robert Morris	67
11	IUPUI	64

Quarterfinals; Thursday, March 2
1	Youngstown State	71
8	Detroit Mercy	66
4	Northern Kentucky	81
5	Oakland	74
2	Milwaukee	87
7	Wright State	70
3	Cleveland State	75*
6	Robert Morris	70

Semifinals; Monday, March 6
1	Youngstown State	63
4	Northern Kentucky	75
2	Milwaukee	80
3	Cleveland State	93

Championship; Tuesday, March 7
4	Northern Kentucky	63
3	Cleveland State	61

* denotes overtime period

=== NCAA Tournament ===
The conference champion receives an automatic bid to the 2023 NCAA Division I men's basketball tournament.

Seed	Region	School	First Four	First round	Second round	Sweet Sixteen	Elite Eight	Final Four	Championship
16	Midwest	Northern Kentucky	—	lost to (1) Houston 63–52	―	―	―	―	―

=== National Invitation Tournament ===
Youngstown State received an automatic bid to the 2023 National Invitation Tournament as the team with the best regular season record who failed to win the conference tournament.

Seed	Bracket	School	First round	Second round	Quarterfinals	Semifinals	Finals
−	Oklahoma State	Youngstown State	lost to (1) Oklahoma State 69–64	−	−	−	−

=== College Basketball Invitational ===
Both Cleveland State and Milwaukee accepted bids to the 2023 College Basketball Invitational after finishes as runner-up and semifinalists in the conference tournament, respectively.

Seed	School	First round	Quarterfinals	Semifinals	Finals
9	Cleveland State	lost to (8) Eastern Kentucky 91–75 (OT)	−	−	−
11	Milwaukee	defeated (6) Stetson 87–83 (OT)	lost to (3) Charlotte 76–65	−	−
Bids	W-L (%):	1–1 (.500)	0–1 (.000)	0–0 (–)	TOTAL: 1–2 (.333)

== National awards ==
=== Preseason watchlists ===
Below is a table of notable preseason watch lists.

	Wooden	Naismith	Robertson	Cousy	West	Erving	Malone	Abdul-Jabbar	Olson	Henson
Antoine Davis, Detroit Mercy	✓			✓						✓
Jarred Godfrey, Purdue Fort Wayne										✓
Trey Townsend, Oakland										✓
Marques Warrick, Northern Kentucky										✓

=== Midseason watchlists ===
Below is a table of notable midseason watch lists.

Player	Wooden	Naismith	Naismith DPOY	Robertson	Cousy	West	Erving	Malone	Abdul-Jabbar	Olson
Antoine Davis, Detroit Mercy	✓	✓		✓	✓				✓	

== Conference awards ==
2023 Horizon League Men's Basketball Individual Awards
Award	Recipient(s)
Player of the Year	Antoine Davis, Detroit Mercy
Coach of the Year	Jerrod Calhoun, Youngstown State
Defensive Player of the Year	Ahmad Rand, Milwaukee
Sixth Player of the Year	Trevon Faulkner, Northern Kentucky
Freshman of the Year	Brandon Noel, Wright State

2023 Horizon Men's Basketball All-Conference Teams
First Team	Second Team	Third Team	Defensive Team	Freshman Team
Tristan Enaruna, CSU; Antoine Davis, DET; Jalen Moore, OAK; Trey Calvin, WSU; Dwayne Cohill, YSU	BJ Freeman, MKE; Marques Warrick, NKU; Trey Townsend, OAK; Jarred Godfrey, PFW; Kahliel Spear, RMU	Jlynn Counter, IUPUI; Sam Vinson, NKU; Enoch Cheeks, RMU; Adrian Nelson, YSU; Brandon Rush, YSU	Deante Johnson, CSU; Deshon Parker, CSU; Ahmad Rand, MKE; Sam Vinson, NKU; Kahliel Spear, RMU	Vincent Brady II, IUPUI; DJ Jackson, IUPUI; Elijah Jamison, MKE; Brandon Noel, WSU; John Lovelace Jr., YSU
