= 2022–23 Oakland Golden Grizzlies men's basketball team =

American college basketball season

2022–23 Oakland Golden Grizzlies men's basketball
- Conference: Horizon League
- Record: 13–19 (11–9 Horizon)
- Head coach: Greg Kampe (39th season)
- Associate head coach: Jeff Smith
- Assistant coaches: Tony Jones; Mychal Covington
- Home arena: Athletics Center O'rena

2022–23 Horizon League men's basketball standings
	Conf.				Overall
Team	W		L	PCT	W		L	PCT
Youngstown State	15	–	5	.750	24	–	10	.706
Milwaukee	14	–	6	.700	22	–	12	.647
Cleveland State	14	–	6	.700	21	–	14	.600
Northern Kentucky †	14	–	6	.700	22	–	13	.629
Oakland	11	–	9	.550	13	–	19	.406
Wright State	10	–	10	.500	18	–	15	.545
Robert Morris	10	–	10	.500	16	–	17	.485
Detroit Mercy	9	–	11	.450	14	–	19	.424
Purdue Fort Wayne	9	–	11	.450	17	–	15	.531
IUPUI	2	–	18	.100	5	–	27	.156
Green Bay	2	–	18	.100	3	–	29	.094
† 2023 Horizon League tournament winner

The 2022–23 Oakland Golden Grizzlies men's basketball team represented Oakland University in the 2022–23 NCAA Division I men's basketball season. The Golden Grizzlies, led by 39th-year head coach Greg Kampe, played their home games at the Athletics Center O'rena in Auburn Hills, Michigan as members of the Horizon League. They finished the season 13–18, 11–9 in Horizon League play to finish in fifth place. They were defeated by eventual tournament champions Northern Kentucky in the quarterfinal round of the Horizon League tournament.

== Previous season ==
The Golden Grizzlies finished the 2021–22 season 20–12, 12–7 in Horizon League play to finish in fifth place. They defeated IUPUI in the first round of the Horizon League tournament before losing to Wright State in the quarterfinals. They declined an invitation to The Basketball Classic postseason tournament due to injuries to several players.

== Roster ==
2022–23 Oakland Golden Grizzlies men's basketball team
Players
Coaches

Pos.	#	Name	Height	Weight	Year	Hometown
G	0	Lorne Bowman II	6 ft 1 in (1.85 m)	197 lb (89 kg)	So	Pontiac, Michigan
F	1	Keaton Hervey	6 ft 4 in (1.93 m)	200 lb (91 kg)	GS	Cedar Park, Texas
F	2	Will Shepherd	6 ft 8 in (2.03 m)	220 lb (100 kg)	So	Dallas, Texas
G	3	Rocket Watts	6 ft 2 in (1.88 m)	187 lb (85 kg)	Jr	Detroit, Michigan
F	4	Trey Townsend	6 ft 6 in (1.98 m)	230 lb (104 kg)	So	Oxford, Michigan
G	11	Blake Lampman	6 ft 3 in (1.91 m)	190 lb (86 kg)	Jr	Haslett, Michigan
G	12	Evan Solomon	6 ft 2 in (1.88 m)	175 lb (79 kg)	RS Fr	Charlevoix, Michigan
G	13	Osei Price	6 ft 4 in (1.93 m)	188 lb (85 kg)	So	Upper Marlboro, Maryland
G	14	Brody Parker	6 ft 0 in (1.83 m)	175 lb (79 kg)	So	Troy, Michigan
F	23	Chris Conway	6 ft 9 in (2.06 m)	240 lb (109 kg)	So	Naperville, Illinois
G	24	Darius Sherman	6 ft 2 in (1.88 m)	178 lb (81 kg)	So	Monrovia, Liberia
F	25	Cooper Craggs	6 ft 5 in (1.96 m)	225 lb (102 kg)	Fr	Northville, Michigan
G	34	Jalen Moore	5 ft 11 in (1.8 m)	165 lb (75 kg)	Sr	Cloverdale, Indiana
F	44	Chuol Deng	6 ft 5 in (1.96 m)	200 lb (91 kg)	So	Juba, South Sudan
G	55	Dominic Capriotti	6 ft 3 in (1.91 m)	185 lb (84 kg)	Fr	Tempe, Arizona

Head coach

- Greg Kampe (Bowling Green)

Assistant coach(es)

- Jeff Smith (Southeast Missouri State)
- Tony Jones (Fisk)
- Mychal Covington (Oakland)

Legend

- (C) Team captain
- (S) Suspended
- (I) Ineligible
- (W) Walk-on
- Injured
- Current redshirt

Roster
Last update: January 2, 2023

== Schedule and results ==
Date time, TV	Rank^{#}	Opponent^{#}	Result	Record	Site (attendance) city, state
Exhibition
October 20, 2022*; 7:00 pm, ESPN+		Grand Valley State	W 92–76		Athletics Center O'rena (1,105); Rochester, MI
November 1, 2022*; 7:00 pm		at Rochester	W 66–64		Garth Pleasant Arena (1,140); Rochester Hills, MI
Regular season
November 7, 2022*; 7:00 pm, ESPN+		Defiance College	W 92–27	1–0	Athletics Center O'rena (1,065); Rochester, MI
November 11, 2022*; 7:00 pm, ESPN+		Bowling Green	L 82–87	1–1	Athletics Center O'rena (2,459); Rochester, MI
November 13, 2022*; 7:00 pm, WMYD/ESPN+		Oklahoma State	L 62–91	1–2	Athletics Center O'rena (3,651); Rochester, MI
November 16, 2022*; 7:00 pm, ESPN+		at Toledo	L 90–112	1–3	Savage Arena (4,115); Toledo, OH
November 19, 2022*; 7:00 pm, WMYD/ESPN+		Eastern Michigan	W 92–90 ^{OT}	2–3	Athletics Center O'rena (4,059); Rochester, MI
November 25, 2022*; 8:00 pm, FloHoops		vs. Long Beach State; Nassau Championship quarterfinals	L 70–78	2–4	Baha Mar Convention Center; Nassau, Bahamas
November 26, 2022*; 2:30 pm, FloHoops		vs. San Jose State; Nassau Championship consolation 2nd Round	L 67–80	2–5	Baha Mar Convention Center; Nassau, Bahamas
November 27, 2022*; 7:00 pm, FloHoops		vs. Missouri State; Nassau Championship 7th place game	L 64–76	2–6	Baha Mar Convention Center (200); Nassau, Bahamas
December 1, 2022; 7:00 pm, ESPN+		at Cleveland State	L 64–80	2–7 (0–1)	Wolstein Center (1,671); Cleveland, OH
December 3, 2022; 7:00 pm, ESPNU		at Purdue Fort Wayne	L 73–79 ^{OT}	2–8 (0–2)	Allen County War Memorial Coliseum (1,017); Fort Wayne, IN
December 6, 2022*; 6:00 pm, ACCN		at Syracuse	L 66–95	2–9	JMA Wireless Dome (17,368); Syracuse, NY
December 18, 2022*; 4:00 pm, MW Network		at Boise State	L 57–77	2–10	ExtraMile Arena (7,715); Boise, ID
December 21, 2022*; 6:30 pm, BTN		at Michigan State	L 54–67	2–11	Breslin Center (14,797); East Lansing, MI
December 29, 2022; 7:00 pm, ESPN+		Milwaukee	W 83–61	3–11 (1–2)	Athletics Center O'rena (2,063); Rochester, MI
December 31, 2022; 1:00 pm, ESPN+		Green Bay	W 81–65	4–11 (2–2)	Athletics Center O'rena (1,901); Rochester, MI
January 6, 2023; 7:00 pm, ESPN2		at Northern Kentucky	W 64–63	5–11 (3–2)	Truist Arena (2,575); Highland Heights, KY
January 8, 2023; 1:00 pm, ESPN+		at Wright State	W 75–73	6–11 (4–2)	Nutter Center (3,104); Dayton, OH
January 12, 2023; 7:00 pm, ESPN+		Robert Morris	W 69–65	7–11 (5–2)	Athletics Center O'rena (2,081); Rochester, MI
January 14, 2023; 3:00 pm, ESPN+		Youngstown State	L 69–85	7–12 (5–3)	Athletics Center O'rena (2,342); Rochester, MI
January 19, 2023; 7:00 pm, ESPN+		at IUPUI	W 83–77 ^{OT}	8–12 (6–3)	Indiana Farmers Coliseum (818); Indianapolis, IN
January 23, 2023; 7:00 pm, ESPN+		at Detroit Mercy	W 76–67	9–12 (7–3)	Calihan Hall (2,553); Detroit, MI
January 27, 2023; 7:00 pm, ESPN2		at Youngstown State	L 73–77	9–13 (7–4)	Beeghly Center (3,801); Youngstown, OH
January 29, 2023; 2:00 pm, ESPN+		at Robert Morris	L 63–68	9–14 (7–5)	UPMC Events Center (1,301); Moon Township, PA
February 2, 2023; 7:00 pm, ESPN+		Purdue Fort Wayne	L 73–82	9–15 (7–6)	Athletics Center O'rena (2,569); Rochester, MI
February 4, 2023; 1:00 pm, ESPN+		Cleveland State	W 92–89 ^{OT}	10–15 (8–6)	Athletics Center O'rena (3,185); Rochester, MI
February 9, 2023; 7:00 pm, ESPN+		at Green Bay	W 59–47	11–15 (9–6)	Resch Center (1,401); Green Bay, WI
February 11, 2023; 7:00 pm, ESPN+		at Milwaukee	L 77–80 ^{OT}	11–16 (9–7)	UWM Panther Arena (1,807); Milwaukee, WI
February 15, 2023; 7:00 pm, ESPN+		IUPUI	W 85–81	12–16 (10–7)	Athletics Center O'rena (1,734); Rochester, MI
February 17, 2023; 7:00 pm, WMYD/ESPN+		Detroit Mercy	L 74–96	12–17 (10–8)	Athletics Center O'rena (3,942); Rochester, MI
February 23, 2023; 7:00 pm, ESPN+		Wright State	W 75–68	13–17 (11–8)	Athletics Center O'rena (2,148); Rochester, MI
February 25, 2023; 3:00 pm, ESPN+		Northern Kentucky	L 69–78	13–18 (11–9)	Athletics Center O'rena; Rochester, MI
Horizon League tournament
March 2, 2023; 7:00 pm, ESPN+	(5)	at (4) Northern Kentucky; Quarterfinals	L 74–81	13–19	Truist Arena (2,672); Highland Heights, KY
*Non-conference game. ^{#}Rankings from AP Poll. (#) Tournament seedings in parentheses. All times are in Eastern.
