= 2022–23 Wright State Raiders men's basketball team =

American college basketball season

2022–23 Wright State Raiders men's basketball
- Conference: Horizon League
- Record: 18–15 (10–10 Horizon)
- Head coach: Scott Nagy (7th season)
- Associate head coach: Clint Sargent
- Assistant coaches: Dan Beré; Travis Trice
- Home arena: Nutter Center

2022–23 Horizon League men's basketball standings
	Conf.				Overall
Team	W		L	PCT	W		L	PCT
Youngstown State	15	–	5	.750	24	–	10	.706
Milwaukee	14	–	6	.700	22	–	12	.647
Cleveland State	14	–	6	.700	21	–	14	.600
Northern Kentucky †	14	–	6	.700	22	–	13	.629
Oakland	11	–	9	.550	13	–	19	.406
Wright State	10	–	10	.500	18	–	15	.545
Robert Morris	10	–	10	.500	16	–	17	.485
Detroit Mercy	9	–	11	.450	14	–	19	.424
Purdue Fort Wayne	9	–	11	.450	17	–	15	.531
IUPUI	2	–	18	.100	5	–	27	.156
Green Bay	2	–	18	.100	3	–	29	.094
† 2023 Horizon League tournament winner

The 2022–23 Wright State Raiders men's basketball team represented Wright State University in the 2022–23 NCAA Division I men's basketball season. The Raiders, led by seventh-year head coach Scott Nagy, played their home games at the Nutter Center in Dayton, Ohio as members of the Horizon League.

== Season summary ==
For Wright State, 2022–23 began under the shadow of having lost its two leading scorers not to graduation or injury, but to the new open transfer rules. Grant Basile left for Virginia Tech and Tanner Holden for Ohio State. This fueled the concerns of supporters who worry about Wright State's ability to compete in the NIL era. Veteran CJ Wilbourn was also unavailable much of the season due to injury.

It was a frustratingly mediocre season. After winning 20 or more games for the last six non-shortened seasons, they finished 10–10 in the Horizon League and only 18–15 overall. The losses and many of the victories were marked by turnovers and defensive breakdowns. Like most Scott Nagy teams, the Raiders were one of the top-scoring teams in the nation averaging nearly 80 points per game with a 49.6% field goal accuracy.

New redshirt freshman Brandon Noel was able to make up some of the loss in the front-court, winning Horizon League Freshman of the Year honors while displaying a surprising level of athleticism. However, like many freshman his scoring and defense proved inconsistent game to game, in particular against veteran opponents who could match him physically.

Trey Calvin led the team with outstanding play at point guard, serving both as court general and the most consistent offensive weapon. He finished the season first team all Horizon League. Sophomores Alex Huibregtse and Andrew Welage showed good improvement as the season went on, hinting at better things to come.

== Previous season ==
The Raiders finished the 2021–22 season 22–14, 15–7 in Horizon League play, to finish in fourth place. As the No. 4 seed, they defeated Oakland, Cleveland State and Northern Kentucky to win the Horizon League tournament. They received the conference's automatic bid to the NCAA tournament as the No. 16 seed in the South Region, where they defeated Bryant in the First Four, before losing in the first round to Arizona.

== Roster ==
2022–23 Wright State Raiders men's basketball team
Players
Coaches

Pos.	#	Name	Height	Weight	Year	Hometown
G	0	Amari Davis	6 ft 2 in (1.88 m)	175 lb (79 kg)	Sr	Trotwood, OH
G	1	Trey Calvin	6 ft 0 in (1.83 m)	175 lb (79 kg)	Sr	Glendale Heights, IL
G	2	Drey Carter	6 ft 8 in (2.03 m)	190 lb (86 kg)	Fr	Bellefontaine, OH
G	3	Alex Huibregtse	6 ft 3 in (1.91 m)	195 lb (88 kg)	RS So	Grafton, WI
G	4	Keaton Norris	6 ft 0 in (1.83 m)	165 lb (75 kg)	So	Hilliard, OH
F/C	5	CJ Wilbourn	6 ft 7 in (2.01 m)	235 lb (107 kg)	Sr	Bloomington, IL
G	10	Anthony Johnson	5 ft 11 in (1.8 m)	180 lb (82 kg)	Fr	Kettering, OH
C	12	AJ Braun	6 ft 9 in (2.06 m)	230 lb (104 kg)	So	Dayton, OH
F	14	Brandon Noel	6 ft 8 in (2.03 m)	235 lb (107 kg)	RS Fr	Lucasville, OH
F	20	Andy Neff	6 ft 7 in (2.01 m)	215 lb (98 kg)	Sr	Oakwood, OH
G	21	Logan Woods	6 ft 5 in (1.96 m)	180 lb (82 kg)	Fr	Fairfield, OH
G	22	Andrew Welage	6 ft 6 in (1.98 m)	180 lb (82 kg)	Jr	Greensburg, IN
F	23	Alex Garcia	6 ft 8 in (2.03 m)	—	Fr	Cleveland, OH
G	24	Tim Finke	6 ft 6 in (1.98 m)	215 lb (98 kg)	RS Sr	Champaign, IL
F	52	Blake Sisley	6 ft 9 in (2.06 m)	230 lb (104 kg)	So	Santa Claus, IN

Head coach

- Scott Nagy (Delta State)

Assistant coach(es)

- Clint Sargent (South Dakota State)
- Dan Beré (Indiana)
- Travis Trice (Butler)

Legend

- (C) Team captain
- (S) Suspended
- (I) Ineligible
- (W) Walk-on
- Injured
- Current redshirt

Roster
Last update: January 2, 2023

== Schedule and results ==
Date time, TV	Rank^{#}	Opponent^{#}	Result	Record	Site (attendance) city, state
Regular season
November 9, 2022*; 7:00 p.m., ESPN+		Davidson	L 97–102 ^{2OT}	0–1	Nutter Center (3,784); Dayton, OH
November 12, 2022*; 1:00 p.m., ACCNX/ESPN+		at Louisville	W 73–72	1–1	KFC Yum! Center (12,720); Louisville, KY
November 15, 2022*; 7:00 p.m., ESPN+		Bowling Green	W 80–71	2–1	Nutter Center (3,540); Dayton, OH
November 17, 2022*; 7:00 p.m., ESPN+		Defiance	W 99–56	3–1	Nutter Center (2,972); Dayton, OH
November 21, 2022*; 7:30 p.m., BallerTV		vs. Abilene Christian; Vegas 4	W 77–61	4–1	Dollar Loan Center; Henderson, NV
November 22, 2022*; 10:00 p.m., BallerTV		vs. UC Riverside; Vegas 4	L 65–70	4–2	Dollar Loan Center; Henderson, NV
November 23, 2022*; 4:00 p.m., BallerTV		vs. Weber State; Vegas 4	W 87–65	5–2	Dollar Loan Center; Henderson, NV
December 1, 2022; 7:00 p.m., ESPN+		Robert Morris	L 59–80	5–3 (0–1)	Nutter Center (3,255); Dayton, OH
December 4, 2022; 1:00 p.m., ESPN+		Youngstown State	L 77–88	5–4 (0–2)	Nutter Center (3,205); Dayton, OH
December 10, 2022*; 7:00 p.m., ESPN+		at Western Kentucky	L 60–64	5–5	E. A. Diddle Arena (4,010); Bowling Green, KY
December 14, 2022*; 7:00 p.m., ESPN+		at Akron	L 54–66	5–6	James A. Rhodes Arena (1,398); Akron, OH
December 17, 2022*; 3:00 p.m., ESPN+		Northwestern Ohio	W 111–59	6–6	Nutter Center (3,130); Dayton, OH
December 22, 2022*; 7:00 p.m., ESPN+		at Miami (OH)	W 88–80	7–6	Millett Hall (1,055); Oxford, OH
December 29, 2022; 7:00 p.m., ESPN+		at Northern Kentucky	L 64–78	7–7 (0–3)	Truist Arena (3,669); Highland Heights, KY
January 2, 2023; 2:00 p.m., ESPN+		at IUPUI	W 82–68	8–7 (1–3)	Indiana Farmers Coliseum (742); Indianapolis, IN
January 6, 2023; 7:00 p.m., ESPN+		Detroit Mercy	W 90–85	9–7 (2–3)	Nutter Center (4,488); Dayton, OH
January 8, 2023; 1:00 p.m., ESPN+		Oakland	L 73–75	9–8 (2–4)	Nutter Center (3,104); Dayton, OH
January 12, 2023; 8:00 p.m., ESPN+		at Green Bay	W 99–67	10–8 (3–4)	Resch Center (2,409); Ashwaubenon, WI
January 14, 2023; 7:00 p.m., ESPN+		at Milwaukee	W 78–74 ^{OT}	11–8 (4–4)	UW–Milwaukee Panther Arena (1,892); Milwaukee, WI
January 19, 2023; 7:00 p.m., ESPN+		Purdue Fort Wayne	L 80–88	11–9 (4–5)	Nutter Center (3,373); Dayton, OH
January 21, 2023; 7:00 p.m., ESPN+		Cleveland State	L 77–85	11–10 (4–6)	Nutter Center (4,054); Dayton, OH
January 26, 2023; 7:00 p.m., ESPN+		Milwaukee	W 93–86	12–10 (5–6)	Nutter Center (3,448); Dayton, OH
January 28, 2023; 7:00 p.m., ESPN+		Green Bay	W 77–46	13–10 (6–6)	Nutter Center (5,418); Dayton, OH
February 2, 2023; 7:00 p.m., ESPN+		at Youngstown State	L 89–91 ^{3OT}	13–11 (6–7)	Beeghly Center (2,498); Youngstown, OH
February 4, 2023; 7:00 p.m., ESPN+		at Robert Morris	W 82–67	14–11 (7–7)	UPMC Events Center (1,511); Moon Township, PA
February 8, 2023; 7:00 p.m., ESPN+		IUPUI	W 103–71	15–11 (8–7)	Nutter Center (3,267); Dayton, OH
February 10, 2023; 7:00 p.m., ESPN+		Northern Kentucky	W 83–65	16–11 (9–7)	Nutter Center (5,659); Dayton, OH
February 17, 2023; 7:00 p.m., ESPN+		at Cleveland State	L 68–85	16–12 (9–8)	Wolstein Center (2,902); Cleveland, OH
February 19, 2023; 2:00 p.m., ESPN+		at Purdue Fort Wayne	L 75–77	16–13 (9–9)	Gates Sports Center (1,068); Fort Wayne, IN
February 23, 2023; 7:00 p.m., ESPN+		at Oakland	L 68–75	16–14 (9–10)	Athletics Center O'rena (2,148); Auburn Hills, MI
February 25, 2023; 1:00 p.m., ESPN+		at Detroit Mercy	W 82–71	17–14 (10–10)	Calihan Hall (3,107); Detroit, MI
Horizon League tournament
February 28, 2023; 7:00 p.m., ESPN+	(7)	(10) Green Bay; First round	W 77–57	18–14	Nutter Center (2,597); Dayton, OH
March 2, 2023; 7:00 p.m., ESPN+	(7)	at (2) Milwaukee; Quarterfinals	L 70–87	18–15	Klotsche Center (2,951); Milwaukee, WI
*Non-conference game. ^{#}Rankings from AP poll. (#) Tournament seedings in parentheses. All times are in Eastern.

== Awards and honors ==
Trey Calvin	First Team All Horizon League
Brandon Noel	Horizon League Newcomer of the Year
Brandon Noel	Horizon League All Newcomer Team

== Statistics ==
Number	Name	Games	Average	Points	Assists	Rebounds
1	Trey Calvin	32	20.3	651	118	92
14	Brandon Noel	33	13.0	429	47	288
12	AJ Braun	33	9.4	310	24	162
3	Alex Huibregtse	33	8.6	284	52	94
0	Amari Davis	32	8.5	273	30	96
24	Tim Finke	33	8.0	265	124	196
22	Andrew Welage	33	6.7	222	45	71
4	Keaton Norris	33	3.0	100	49	72
52	Blake Sisley	27	2.7	72	5	25
20	Andy Neff	9	2.2	20	1	11
5	CJ Wilbourn	7	1.6	11	0	1
