= 2022–23 Detroit Mercy Titans men's basketball team =

American college basketball season

2022–23 Detroit Mercy Titans men's basketball
- Conference: Horizon League
- Record: 14–19 (9–11 Horizon)
- Head coach: Mike Davis (5th season)
- Assistant coaches: Mike Davis Jr.; Donnie Marsh; Kerry Rupp
- Home arena: Calihan Hall

2022–23 Horizon League men's basketball standings
	Conf.				Overall
Team	W		L	PCT	W		L	PCT
Youngstown State	15	–	5	.750	24	–	10	.706
Milwaukee	14	–	6	.700	22	–	12	.647
Cleveland State	14	–	6	.700	21	–	14	.600
Northern Kentucky †	14	–	6	.700	22	–	13	.629
Oakland	11	–	9	.550	13	–	19	.406
Wright State	10	–	10	.500	18	–	15	.545
Robert Morris	10	–	10	.500	16	–	17	.485
Detroit Mercy	9	–	11	.450	14	–	19	.424
Purdue Fort Wayne	9	–	11	.450	17	–	15	.531
IUPUI	2	–	18	.100	5	–	27	.156
Green Bay	2	–	18	.100	3	–	29	.094
† 2023 Horizon League tournament winner

The 2022–23 Detroit Mercy Titans men's basketball team represented the University of Detroit Mercy in the 2022–23 NCAA Division I men's basketball season. The Titans, led by fifth-year head coach Mike Davis, played their home games at Calihan Hall in Detroit, Michigan, as members of the Horizon League. They finished the season 13–18, 9–11 in Horizon League play to tie for eighth place. They defeated Purdue Fort Wayne in the first round of the Horizon League Tournament before losing to Youngstown State in the quarterfinals.

Titans guard Antoine Davis moved into second place on the all-time Division I men's scoring list behind LSU great Pete Maravich, passing Portland State's Freeman Williams on January 21, 2023. Davis finished his college career with 3,664 points, which fell three points shy of Maravich's record of 3,667.

== Previous season ==
The Titans finished the 2021–22 season 14–15, 10–7 in Horizon League play to finish in sixth place. They defeated Green Bay in the first round of the Horizon League tournament, before falling to Northern Kentucky in the quarterfinals. They were invited to The Basketball Classic, where they lost to Florida Gulf Coast in the first round.

== Roster ==
2022–23 Detroit Mercy Titans men's basketball team
Players
Coaches

Pos.	#	Name	Height	Weight	Year	Hometown
G	0	Antoine Davis	6 ft 1 in (1.85 m)	165 lb (75 kg)	GS	Birmingham, Alabama
G	1	TJ Moss	6 ft 4 in (1.93 m)	180 lb (82 kg)	GS	Memphis, Tennessee
G	2	Kyle LeGreair	6 ft 0 in (1.83 m)	180 lb (82 kg)	Jr	Detroit, Michigan
G	4	Marcus Tankersley	6 ft 4 in (1.93 m)	193 lb (88 kg)	Fr	Chattanooga, Tennessee
G	5	Sonny Johnson	5 ft 10 in (1.78 m)	160 lb (73 kg)	Fr	Cleveland, Ohio
G	10	Jamail Pink	6 ft 1 in (1.85 m)	164 lb (74 kg)	So	Houston, Texas
F	11	Gerald Liddell	6 ft 8 in (2.03 m)	203 lb (92 kg)	Sr	Cibolo, Texas
F	12	Jordan Phillips	6 ft 7 in (2.01 m)	215 lb (98 kg)	Sr	Fort Worth, Texas
G/F	13	Isaiah Jones	6 ft 8 in (2.03 m)	209 lb (95 kg)	Fr	Nashville, Tennessee
G	14	Jayden Stone	6 ft 4 in (1.93 m)	195 lb (88 kg)	Jr	Perth, Australia
F	15	Arashma Parks	6 ft 9 in (2.06 m)	235 lb (107 kg)	GS	Cleveland, Ohio
G	21	A.J. Oliver	6 ft 5 in (1.96 m)	200 lb (91 kg)	GS	Birmingham, Alabama
G/F	23	Damezi Anderson	6 ft 7 in (2.01 m)	230 lb (104 kg)	GS	South Bend, Indiana
C	33	Buay Koka	7 ft 1 in (2.16 m)	202 lb (92 kg)	GS	Nasir, South Sudan
G	41	Tobin Schwannecke	6 ft 3 in (1.91 m)	205 lb (93 kg)	So	Traverse City, Michigan

Head coach

- Mike Davis (Alabama)

Assistant coach(es)

- Mike Davis Jr. (UAB)
- Donnie Marsh (Franklin & Marshall)
- Kerry Rupp (Southern Utah)

Legend

- (C) Team captain
- (S) Suspended
- (I) Ineligible
- (W) Walk-on
- Injured
- Current redshirt

Roster
Last update: December 24, 2022

== Schedule and results ==
Date time, TV	Rank^{#}	Opponent^{#}	Result	Record	Site (attendance) city, state
Regular season
November 8, 2022*; 7:00 pm, ESPN+		Rochester	W 93–65	1–0	Calihan Hall (1,735); Detroit, MI
November 11, 2022*; 1:00 pm, ACCNX/ESPN+		at Boston College	L 66–70	1–1	Conte Forum (4,830); Chestnut Hill, MA
November 16, 2022*; 7:00 pm, ESPN+		Ohio	W 88–74	2–1	Calihan Hall (1,587); Detroit, MI
November 19, 2022*; 6:00 pm, CUSA.tv		at Florida Atlantic; Paradise Invitational	L 55–76	2–2	Eleanor R. Baldwin Arena (1,420); Boca Raton, FL
November 21, 2022*; 12:00 pm		vs. Bryant; Paradise Invitational	L 88–98	2–3	Eleanor R. Baldwin Arena (105); Boca Raton, FL
November 23, 2022*; 12:00 pm, ESPN+		Charlotte	W 70–49	3–3	Calihan Hall (1,707); Detroit, MI
November 25, 2022*; 4:00 pm, P12N		at Washington State	L 54–96	3–4	Beasley Coliseum (3,275); Pullman, WA
December 1, 2022; 7:00 pm, ESPN+		at Purdue Fort Wayne	W 75–66	4–4 (1–0)	Memorial Coliseum (1,495); Fort Wayne, IN
December 3, 2022; 3:00 pm, ESPN+		at Cleveland State	L 77–92	4–5 (1–1)	Wolstein Center (1,409); Cleveland, OH
December 7, 2022*; 8:00 pm, ESPN+		at Tulsa	W 76–72	5–5	Reynolds Center (3,012); Tulsa, OK
December 10, 2022*; 2:00 pm, ESPN+		at Charlotte	L 80–82 ^{OT}	5–6	Dale F. Halton Arena (2,704); Charlotte, NC
December 18, 2022*; 3:00 pm, ESPN+		at Eastern Michigan	L 77–79	5–7	George Gervin GameAbove Center (2,823); Ypsilanti, MI
December 21, 2022*; 7:00 pm, ESPN+		at Cincinnati	L 54–72	5–8	Fifth Third Arena (9,519); Cincinnati, OH
December 29, 2022; 7:00 pm, ESPN+		Green Bay	W 76–59	6–8 (2–1)	Calihan Hall (1,543); Detroit, MI
December 31, 2022; 12:00 pm, ESPN+		Milwaukee	L 81–84	6–9 (2–2)	Calihan Hall (1,533); Detroit, MI
January 6, 2023; 7:00 pm, ESPN+		at Wright State	L 85–90	6–10 (2–3)	Nutter Center (4,488); Dayton, OH
January 8, 2023; 2:00 pm, ESPN+		at Northern Kentucky	L 76–78 ^{OT}	6–11 (2–4)	Truist Arena (2,480); Highland Heights, KY
January 12, 2023; 7:00 pm, ESPN+		Youngstown State	L 79–84	6–12 (2–5)	Calihan Hall (1,333); Detroit, MI
January 14, 2023; 1:00 pm, ESPN+		Robert Morris	W 87–75	7–12 (3–5)	Calihan Hall (1,667); Detroit, MI
January 21, 2023; 12:00 pm, ESPN+		at IUPUI	W 89–77	8–12 (4–5)	Indiana Farmers Coliseum (1,101); Indianapolis, IN
January 23, 2023; 7:00 pm, ESPN+		Oakland	L 67–76	8–13 (4–6)	Calihan Hall (2,553); Detroit, MI
January 27, 2023; 7:00 pm, ESPN+		at Robert Morris	L 77–85	8–14 (4–7)	UPMC Events Center (1,413); Moon Township, PA
January 29, 2023; 2:00 pm, ESPN+		at Youngstown State	L 63–73	8–15 (4–8)	Beeghly Center (4,187); Youngstown, OH
February 2, 2023; 7:00 pm, ESPN+		Cleveland State	W 85–67	9–15 (5–8)	Calihan Hall (1,413); Detroit, MI
February 4, 2023; 1:00 pm, ESPN+		Purdue Fort Wayne	W 85–52	10–15 (6–8)	Calihan Hall (2,021); Detroit, MI
February 9, 2023; 8:00 pm, ESPN+		at Milwaukee	L 89–94	10–16 (6–9)	UW–Milwaukee Panther Arena (1,768); Milwaukee, WI
February 11, 2023; 7:00 pm, ESPN+		at Green Bay	W 76–71	11–16 (7–9)	Kress Events Center (1,403); Green Bay, WI
February 17, 2023; 7:00 pm, ESPN+		at Oakland	W 96–74	12–16 (8–9)	Athletics Center O'rena (3,942); Auburn Hills, MI
February 19, 2023; 1:00 pm, ESPN+		IUPUI	W 81–68	13–16 (9–9)	Calihan Hall (1,917); Detroit, MI
February 23, 2023; 7:00 pm, ESPN+		Northern Kentucky	L 64–67	13–17 (9–10)	Calihan Hall (1,335); Detroit, MI
February 25, 2023; 1:00 pm, ESPN+		Wright State	L 71–82	13–18 (9–11)	Calihan Hall (3,107); Detroit, MI
Horizon League tournament
February 28, 2023; 7:00 pm, ESPN+	(8)	(9) Purdue Fort Wayne; First round	W 81–68	14–18	Calihan Hall (1,663); Detroit, MI
March 2, 2023; 7:00 pm, ESPN+	(8)	at (1) Youngstown State; Quarterfinals	L 66–71	14–19	Beeghly Center (5,584); Youngstown, OH
*Non-conference game. ^{#}Rankings from AP Poll. (#) Tournament seedings in parentheses. All times are in Eastern.
