= 2022–23 Purdue Fort Wayne Mastodons men's basketball team =

American college basketball season

2022–23 Purdue Fort Wayne Mastodons men's basketball
- Conference: Horizon League
- Record: 17–15 (9–11 Horizon)
- Head coach: Jon Coffman (9th season)
- Assistant coaches: Ryan Sims (13th season); Adam Blaylock (5th season); Mike Wolf (4th season); Pat Lepper (2nd season)
- Home arena: Hilliard Gates Sports Center

2022–23 Horizon League men's basketball standings
	Conf.				Overall
Team	W		L	PCT	W		L	PCT
Youngstown State	15	–	5	.750	24	–	10	.706
Milwaukee	14	–	6	.700	22	–	12	.647
Cleveland State	14	–	6	.700	21	–	14	.600
Northern Kentucky †	14	–	6	.700	22	–	13	.629
Oakland	11	–	9	.550	13	–	19	.406
Wright State	10	–	10	.500	18	–	15	.545
Robert Morris	10	–	10	.500	16	–	17	.485
Detroit Mercy	9	–	11	.450	14	–	19	.424
Purdue Fort Wayne	9	–	11	.450	17	–	15	.531
IUPUI	2	–	18	.100	5	–	27	.156
Green Bay	2	–	18	.100	3	–	29	.094
† 2023 Horizon League tournament winner

The 2022–23 Purdue Fort Wayne Mastodons men's basketball team represented Purdue University Fort Wayne in the 2022–23 NCAA Division I men's basketball season. The Mastodons, led by ninth-year head coach Jon Coffman, played their home games at the Hilliard Gates Sports Center in Fort Wayne, Indiana, as members of the Horizon League. They finished the season 17–15, 9–11 in Horizon League play to finish in a tie for eighth place. As the No. 9 seed in the Horizon League tournament, they lost to Detroit Mercy in the first round.

== Previous season ==
The Mastodons finished the 2020–21 season 21–12, 15–6 in Horizon League play to finish in a tie for first place, earning a share of the Horizon League regular season championship. As the No. 2 seed in the Horizon League tournament, they defeated UIC in the quarterfinals before losing to Northern Kentucky in the semifinals. The Mastodons accepted an invitation to the College Basketball Invitational and earned the No. 16 overall seed. The Mastodons lost to the No. 1 seed Drake in the first round.

== Offseason ==
=== Departures ===
Name	Number	Pos.	Height	Weight	Year	Hometown	Reason for departure
Jarvis Walker	4	G	6'2"	200	Sophomore	Muskegon, MI	Transferred to Indianapolis
RJ Ogom	23	F	6'6"	230	RS Freshman	Chicago, IL	Transferred to Indian Hills CC
Phil Robles II	24	G	5'8"	160	Freshman	South Bend, IN	Transferred to Holy Cross College
Max Polk	25	G	6'2"	175	Freshman	Omaha, NE	Transferred to Iowa Western CC
Cameron Benford	34	F	6'8"	240	Graduate Student	Seattle, WA	Graduated
Jalon Pipkins	50	G	6'4"	185	Graduate Student	Paris, TX	Graduated

=== Incoming transfers ===
Name	Number	Pos.	Height	Weight	Year	Hometown	Previous School
Deangelo Elisee	13	F	6'9"	220	Junior	Nassau, Bahamas	Triton College
Anthony Roberts	22	G	6'4"	210	Senior	Oak Park, IL	St. Cloud State
Dow Dunton	25	F	6'7"	210	Graduate Student	Wake Forest, NC	Lynchburg

== Roster ==
2022–23 Purdue Fort Wayne Mastodons men's basketball team
Players
Coaches

Pos.	#	Name	Height	Weight	Year	Previous school	Hometown
F	0	Bobby Planutis	6 ft 8 in (2.03 m)	205 lb (93 kg)	GS	St. Bonaventure	Hazleton, Pennsylvania
G	1	Jarred Godfrey	6 ft 5 in (1.96 m)	190 lb (86 kg)	GS	Sandy Creek	Atlanta, Georgia
G	2	Damian Chong Qui	5 ft 8 in (1.73 m)	155 lb (70 kg)	GS	Mount St. Mary's	Baltimore, Maryland
F	3	Ra Kpedi	6 ft 9 in (2.06 m)	245 lb (111 kg)	GS	Vermont	Indianapolis, Indiana
G	4	Chris Morgan	6 ft 2 in (1.88 m)	165 lb (75 kg)	Fr	Kaukauna	Kaukauna, Wisconsin
F	5	Johnathan Dejurnett	6 ft 8 in (2.03 m)	225 lb (102 kg)	Jr	Lausanne Collegiate	Memphis, Tennessee
G	10	JoJo Peterson	6 ft 5 in (1.96 m)	185 lb (84 kg)	So	Mount Pisgah	Johns Creek, Georgia
G	11	Quinton Morton-Robertson	5 ft 8 in (1.73 m)	165 lb (75 kg)	RS Jr	Radford	Radford, Virginia
F	13	Deangelo Elisee	6 ft 9 in (2.06 m)	220 lb (100 kg)	Jr	Triton	Nassau, Bahamas
F	14	Redford Dunton	6 ft 7 in (2.01 m)	195 lb (88 kg)	RS Fr	Millbrook	Raleigh, North Carolina
G	15	Deonte Billups	6 ft 4 in (1.93 m)	200 lb (91 kg)	Sr	Moline	Moline, Illinois
G	22	Anthony Roberts	6 ft 4 in (1.93 m)	210 lb (95 kg)	Sr	St. Cloud State	Oak Park, Illinois
G	24	Keaton Dukes	6 ft 3 in (1.91 m)	160 lb (73 kg)	Fr	Wawasee	Syracuse, Indiana
F	25	Dow Dunton	6 ft 7 in (2.01 m)	210 lb (95 kg)	GS	Lynchburg	Wake Forest, North Carolina
G	32	Eric Mulder	6 ft 8 in (2.03 m)	200 lb (91 kg)	Fr	Pella Christian	Oskaloosa, Iowa

Head coach

- Jon Coffman (Washington and Lee)

Assistant coach(es)

- Ryan Sims (Indianapolis)
- Mike Wolf (William Peace)
- Adam Blaylock (Peru State)
- Pat Lepper (IPFW)

Legend

- (C) Team captain
- (S) Suspended
- (I) Ineligible
- (W) Walk-on
- Injured
- Current redshirt

Roster
Last update: November 6, 2022

== Schedule and results ==
Date time, TV	Rank^{#}	Opponent^{#}	Result	Record	High points	High rebounds	High assists	Site (attendance) city, state
Regular season
November 7, 2022*; 6:30 p.m., BTN		at No. 22 Michigan	L 56–75	0–1	15 – Morton-Robertson	12 – Planutis	4 – Chong Qui	Crisler Center (11,107); Ann Arbor, MI
November 12, 2022*; 1:00 p.m., ESPN+		SIU Edwardsville	W 81–76	1–1	18 – Tied	9 – Tied	6 – Chong Qui	Memorial Coliseum (1,374); Fort Wayne, IN
November 14, 2022*; 7:00 p.m., ESPN+		Manchester	W 111–31	2–1	26 – Morton-Robertson	10 – Peterson	9 – Godfrey	Memorial Coliseum (1,740); Fort Wayne, IN
November 18, 2022*; 8:00 p.m., B1G+		at Northwestern; Cancún Challenge campus game	L 52–60	2–2	14 – Planutis	10 – Kpedi	5 – Chong Qui	Welsh–Ryan Arena (2,931); Evanston, IL
November 22, 2022*; 12:30 p.m.		vs. Eastern Michigan; Cancún Challenge (Mayan Division) Semifinal	W 74–67	3–2	21 – Godfrey	7 – Godfrey	5 – Godfrey	Riviera Maya (250); Cancún, Mexico
November 23, 2022*; 3:00 p.m.		vs. Southern Miss; Cancún Challenge (Mayan Division) Final	L 58–70	3–3	14 – Godfrey	6 – Tied	4 – Chong Qui	Riviera Maya (107); Cancún, Mexico
November 27, 2022*; 2:00 p.m., ESPN+		Bluffton	W 106–41	4–3	23 – Roberts	9 – DeJurnett	7 – Chong Qui	Memorial Coliseum (1,352); Fort Wayne, IN
December 1, 2022; 7:00 p.m., ESPN+		Detroit Mercy	L 66–75	4–4 (0–1)	20 – Godfrey	9 – Godfrey	3 – Chong Qui	Memorial Coliseum (1,495); Fort Wayne, IN
December 3, 2022; 1:00 p.m., ESPNU		Oakland	W 79–73	5–4 (1–1)	20 – Planutis	12 – Kpedi	5 – Tied	Memorial Coliseum (1,017); Fort Wayne, IN
December 7, 2022*; 8:00 p.m., ESPN+		at Southeast Missouri State	W 89–68	6–4	19 – Godfrey	8 – Tied	5 – Godfrey	Show Me Center (1,155); Cape Girardeau, MO
December 10, 2022*; 8:00 p.m., ESPN+		at Missouri State	W 65–61	7–4	17 – Godfrey	14 – Kpedi	4 – Godfrey	Great Southern Bank Arena (3,887); Springfield, MO
December 19, 2022*; 7:00 p.m., ESPN+		Texas A&M–Commerce; Indiana Classic	W 85–68	8–4	15 – Planutis	9 – Kpedi	7 – Godfrey	Memorial Coliseum; Fort Wayne, IN
December 20, 2022*; 7:00 p.m., ESPN+		Southern Indiana; Indiana Classic	W 83–59	9–4	21 – Godfrey	6 – Tied	5 – Godfrey	Memorial Coliseum (2,145); Fort Wayne, IN
December 29, 2022; 7:00 p.m., ESPN+		at Robert Morris	L 70–75	9–5 (1–2)	20 – Godfrey	15 – Kpedi	5 – Tied	UPMC Events Center (889); Moon Township, PA
December 31, 2022; 2:45 p.m., ESPN+		at Youngstown State	W 76–71	10–5 (2–2)	24 – Chong Qui	8 – Godfrey	6 – Godfrey	Beeghly Center (1,953); Youngstown, OH
January 5, 2023; 7:00 p.m., ESPN+		Green Bay	W 79–69	11–5 (3–2)	23 – Godfrey	9 – Tied	4 – Chong Qui	Memorial Coliseum (1,473); Fort Wayne, IN
January 7, 2023; 1:00 p.m., ESPN+		Milwaukee	L 70–74	11–6 (3–3)	22 – Godfrey	10 – Kpedi	7 – Chong Qui	Memorial Coliseum (1,552); Fort Wayne, IN
January 12, 2023; 7:00 p.m., ESPN+		at IUPUI	W 70–55	12–6 (4–3)	22 – Godfrey	8 – Kpedi	4 – Chong Qui	Indiana Farmers Coliseum (795); Indianapolis, IN
January 16, 2023; 7:00 p.m., ESPN+		Cleveland State	L 60–72	12–7 (4–4)	13 – Kpedi	13 – Kpedi	5 – Godfrey	Memorial Coliseum (1,327); Fort Wayne, IN
January 19, 2023; 7:00 p.m., ESPN+		at Wright State	W 88–80	13–7 (5–4)	19 – Morton-Robertson	9 – Tied	3 – Godfrey	Nutter Center (3,373); Dayton, OH
January 21, 2023; 6:00 p.m., ESPN+		at Northern Kentucky	L 54–74	13–8 (5–5)	10 – Tied	6 – Mulder	4 – Chong Qui	Truist Arena (2,872); Highland Heights, KY
January 25, 2023; 7:00 p.m., ESPN+		IUPUI	W 81–75	14–8 (6–5)	26 – Billups	7 – Tied	7 – Chong Qui	Gates Sports Center (874); Fort Wayne, IN
January 27, 2023; 7:00 p.m., ESPN+		at Cleveland State	L 74–79	14–9 (6–6)	31 – Chong Qui	9 – Kpedi	4 – Planutis	Wolstein Center (2,088); Cleveland, OH
February 2, 2023; 7:00 p.m., ESPN+		at Oakland	W 82–73	15–9 (7–6)	32 – Godfrey	7 – Tied	3 – Tied	Athletics Center O'rena (2,569); Rochester, MI
February 4, 2023; 1:00 p.m., ESPN+		at Detroit Mercy	L 52–85	15–10 (7–7)	11 – Planutis	7 – Kpedi	3 – Godfrey	Calihan Hall (2,021); Detroit, MI
February 10, 2023; 7:00 p.m., ESPN+		Youngstown State	L 72–81	15–11 (7–8)	33 – Godfrey	7 – Godfrey	4 – Tied	Memorial Coliseum (1,632); Fort Wayne, IN
February 12, 2023; 1:00 p.m., ESPN+		Robert Morris	L 64–71	15–12 (7–9)	23 – Godfrey	9 – Kpedi	4 – Godfrey	Gates Sports Center (871); Fort Wayne, IN
February 17, 2023; 7:00 p.m., ESPN+		Northern Kentucky	L 50–63	15–13 (7–10)	14 – Godfrey	5 – Tied	6 – Chong Qui	Memorial Coliseum (1,978); Fort Wayne, IN
February 19, 2023; 2:00 p.m., ESPN+		Wright State	W 77–75	16–13 (8–10)	25 – Godfrey	15 – Kpedi	4 – Chong Qui	Gates Sports Center (1,069); Fort Wayne, IN
February 23, 2023; 8:30 p.m., ESPN+		at Milwaukee	L 94–96	16–14 (8–11)	21 – Godfrey	8 – Kpedi	5 – Godfrey	UW–Milwaukee Panther Arena (1,790); Milwaukee, WI
February 25, 2023; 8:30 p.m., ESPN+		at Green Bay	W 78–61	17–14 (9–11)	29 – Godfrey	7 – Morton-Robertson	5 – Morton-Robertson	Kress Events Center (1,361); Green Bay, WI
Horizon League tournament
February 28, 2022; 7:00 p.m., ESPN+	(9)	at (8) Detroit Mercy; First Round	L 68–81	17–15	20 – Planutis	6 – Tied	7 – Chong Qui	Calihan Hall (1,663); Detroit, MI
*Non-conference game. ^{#}Rankings from AP Poll. (#) Tournament seedings in parentheses. All times are in Eastern.
