= 2022–23 Robert Morris Colonials men's basketball team =

American college basketball season

2022–23 Robert Morris Colonials men's basketball
- Conference: Horizon League
- Record: 16–17 (10–10 Horizon)
- Head coach: Andrew Toole (13th season)
- Associate head coach: Mike Iuzzolino
- Assistant coaches: Vince Johnson; Dave Fedor
- Home arena: UPMC Events Center

2022–23 Horizon League men's basketball standings
	Conf.				Overall
Team	W		L	PCT	W		L	PCT
Youngstown State	15	–	5	.750	24	–	10	.706
Milwaukee	14	–	6	.700	22	–	12	.647
Cleveland State	14	–	6	.700	21	–	14	.600
Northern Kentucky †	14	–	6	.700	22	–	13	.629
Oakland	11	–	9	.550	13	–	19	.406
Wright State	10	–	10	.500	18	–	15	.545
Robert Morris	10	–	10	.500	16	–	17	.485
Detroit Mercy	9	–	11	.450	14	–	19	.424
Purdue Fort Wayne	9	–	11	.450	17	–	15	.531
IUPUI	2	–	18	.100	5	–	27	.156
Green Bay	2	–	18	.100	3	–	29	.094
† 2023 Horizon League tournament winner

The 2022–23 Robert Morris Colonials men's basketball team represented Robert Morris University in the 2022–23 NCAA Division I men's basketball season. The Colonials, led by 13th-year head coach Andrew Toole, played their home games at the UPMC Events Center in Moon Township, Pennsylvania as members of the Horizon League. They finished the season 15–16, 10–10 in Horizon League play, to finish in a tie for sixth place. As the No. 6 seed in the Horizon League tournament, they defeated IUPUI in the first round to advance to the quarterfinal round, where they fell to Cleveland State in overtime.

== Previous season ==
The Colonials finished the 2021–22 season 8–24, 5–16 in Horizon League play, to finish in tenth place. As the No. 10 seed, they upset No. 7 seed Youngstown State in the first round of the Horizon League tournament, before falling to top-seeded Cleveland State.

== Roster ==
2022–23 Robert Morris Colonials men's basketball team
Players
Coaches

Pos.	#	Name	Height	Weight	Year	Previous school	Hometown
G	1	TJ Wainwright	6 ft 3 in (1.91 m)	180 lb (82 kg)	Fr	Montverde Academy	Los Angeles, CA
F	2	Kahliel Spear	6 ft 7 in (2.01 m)	220 lb (100 kg)	GS	Bucknell	The Colony, TX
G	3	Michael III Green	5 ft 11 in (1.8 m)	150 lb (68 kg)	Sr	Bryant	The Bronx, NY
G	5	Enoch Cheeks	6 ft 3 in (1.91 m)	190 lb (86 kg)	Jr	Putnam Science Academy	Providence, RI
F	11	Stephaun Walker	6 ft 7 in (2.01 m)	205 lb (93 kg)	Fr	Calvin Coolidge HS	Washington, D.C.
G	12	Jackson Last	6 ft 5 in (1.96 m)	195 lb (88 kg)	So	Salt Lake CC	Hurricane, UT
G	13	Tristian Jeffries	6 ft 6 in (1.98 m)	185 lb (84 kg)	So	St. Thomas Aquinas HS	Jersey City, NJ
G/F	20	Nathan Frascone	6 ft 6 in (1.98 m)	200 lb (91 kg)	Fr	Tuslaw HS	Massillon, OH
F	21	Matt Mayers	6 ft 8 in (2.03 m)	210 lb (95 kg)	Sr	Hutchinson CC	Hastings-on-Hudson, NY
F	22	Kevin Martina	6 ft 7 in (2.01 m)	215 lb (98 kg)	So	Sam Houston State	Geneva, Switzerland
G	23	Chris Ford	6 ft 5 in (1.96 m)	200 lb (91 kg)	So	Davidson	Huntersville, NC
G	24	Tanner O'Grady	6 ft 0 in (1.83 m)	175 lb (79 kg)	Fr	Upper St. Clair HS	Pittsburgh, PA
G/F	31	Cyril Arvanitis	6 ft 3 in (1.91 m)	185 lb (84 kg)	Fr	Red Bank Catholic HS	Elberon, NJ
G	32	Josh Corbin	6 ft 3 in (1.91 m)	190 lb (86 kg)	Jr	Winthrop	Gahanna, OH
G	42	Ben Krystkowiak	6 ft 4 in (1.93 m)	175 lb (79 kg)	Fr	IMG Academy	San Diego, CA
F	50	Trey James	6 ft 9 in (2.06 m)	235 lb (107 kg)	So	Iona	Inez, KY

Head coach

- Andrew Toole (Pennsylvania)

Assistant coach(es)

- Mike Iuzzolino (Saint Francis (PA))
- Vince Johnson (St. Thomas Aquinas)
- Dave Fedor (Rutgers)

Legend

- (C) Team captain
- (S) Suspended
- (I) Ineligible
- (W) Walk-on
- Injured
- Current redshirt

Roster
Last update: November 15, 2022

== Schedule and results ==
Date time, TV	Rank^{#}	Opponent^{#}	Result	Record	Site (attendance) city, state
Exhibition
October 29, 2022*; 1:00 p.m.		Alliance	W 88–59	–	UPMC Events Center; Moon Township, PA
Regular season
November 7, 2022*; 7:00 p.m.		at Ohio State	L 53–91	0–1	Value City Arena (9,141); Columbus, OH
November 9, 2022*; 7:00 p.m., ESPN+		Pitt–Greensburg	W 84–49	1–1	UPMC Events Center (3,610); Moon Township, PA
November 16, 2022*; 7:00 p.m., ESPN+		West Virginia Wesleyan	W 111–56	2–1	UPMC Events Center (527); Moon Township, PA
November 19, 2022*; 1:00 p.m., ESPN+		at No. 21 Dayton	L 51–60	2–2	UD Arena (13,407); Dayton, OH
November 25, 2022*; 9:00 p.m., BTB		vs. Mercer; Hostilo Hoops Community Classic	L 66–72	2–3	Enmarket Arena (287); Savannah, GA
November 26, 2022*; 5:00 p.m., BTB		vs. Evansville; Hostilo Hoops Community Classic	L 53–54	2–4	Enmarket Arena (285); Savannah, GA
November 27, 2022*; 2:30 p.m., BTB		vs. South Alabama; Hostilo Hoops Community Classic	L 70–84	2–5	Enmarket Arena (207); Savannah, GA
December 1, 2022; 7:00 p.m., ESPN+		at Wright State	W 80–59	3–5 (1–0)	Nutter Center (3,255); Dayton, OH
December 3, 2022; 6:00 p.m., ESPN+		at Northern Kentucky	L 56–60	3–6 (1–1)	Truist Arena (2,351); Highland Heights, KY
December 7, 2022*; 7:00 p.m., ESPN+		at Central Michigan	W 71–66	4–6	McGuirk Arena (1,269); Mount Pleasant, MI
December 10, 2022*; 7:00 p.m., ESPN+		Marshall	L 60–69	4–7	UPMC Events Center (1,627); Moon Township, PA
December 18, 2022*; 2:00 p.m., ESPN+		at Mount St. Mary's	W 68–59	5–7	Knott Arena (1,562); Emmitsburg, MD
December 21, 2022*; 7:00 p.m., ESPN+		Saint Francis (PA)	W 77–66	6–7	UPMC Events Center (841); Moon Township, PA
December 29, 2022; 7:00 p.m., ESPN+		Purdue Fort Wayne	W 75–70	7–7 (2–1)	UPMC Events Center (889); Moon Township, PA
December 31, 2022; 3:00 p.m., ESPN+		Cleveland State	L 54–63	7–8 (2–2)	UPMC Events Center (616); Moon Township, PA
January 5, 2023; 7:00 p.m., ESPN+		at Youngstown State	L 56–78	7–9 (2–3)	Beeghly Center (1,377); Youngstown, OH
January 9, 2023; 7:00 p.m., ESPN+		IUPUI	W 77–70	8–9 (3–3)	UPMC Events Center (1,182); Moon Township, PA
January 12, 2023; 7:00 p.m., ESPN+		at Oakland	L 65–69	8–10 (3–4)	Athletics Center O'rena (2,081); Auburn Hills, MI
January 14, 2023; 1:00 p.m., ESPN+		at Detroit Mercy	L 75–87	8–11 (3–5)	Calihan Hall (1,667); Detroit, MI
January 19, 2023; 8:00 p.m., ESPN+		at Milwaukee	L 69–77	8–12 (3–6)	UW–Milwaukee Panther Arena (1,305); Milwaukee, WI
January 21, 2023; 7:00 p.m., ESPN+		at Green Bay	W 72–38	9–12 (4–6)	Resch Center (1,600); Ashwaubenon, WI
January 27, 2023; 7:00 p.m., ESPN+		Detroit Mercy	W 85–77	10–12 (5–6)	UPMC Events Center (1,413); Moon Township, PA
January 29, 2023; 1:00 p.m., ESPN+		Oakland	W 68–63	11–12 (6–6)	UPMC Events Center (1,301); Moon Township, PA
February 2, 2023; 7:00 p.m., ESPN+		Northern Kentucky	L 52–65	11–13 (6–7)	UPMC Events Center (1,147); Moon Township, PA
February 4, 2023; 7:00 p.m., ESPN+		Wright State	L 67–82	11–14 (6–8)	UPMC Events Center (1,511); Moon Township, PA
February 10, 2023; 7:00 p.m., ESPN+		at Cleveland State	L 55–57	11–15 (6–9)	Wolstein Center (1,901); Cleveland, OH
February 12, 2023; 1:00 p.m., ESPN+		at Purdue Fort Wayne	W 71–64	12–15 (7–9)	Gates Sports Center (871); Fort Wayne, IN
February 16, 2023; 7:00 p.m., ESPN+		Green Bay	W 71–56	13–15 (8–9)	UPMC Events Center (915); Moon Township, PA
February 18, 2023; 7:00 p.m., ESPN+		Milwaukee	W 80–60	14–15 (9–9)	UPMC Events Center (1,612); Moon Township, PA
February 21, 2023; 7:00 p.m., ESPN+		Youngstown State	W 83–64	15–15 (10–9)	UPMC Events Center (1,552); Moon Township, PA
February 23, 2023; 7:30 p.m., ESPN+		at IUPUI	L 75–81	15–16 (10–10)	Indiana Farmers Coliseum (1,189); Indianapolis, IN
Horizon League tournament
February 28, 2023; 7:00 p.m., ESPN+	(6)	(11) IUPUI; First round	W 67–64	16–16	UPMC Events Center (1,214); Moon Township, PA
March 2, 2023; 7:00 p.m., ESPN+	(6)	at (3) Cleveland State; Quarterfinals	L 70–75 ^{OT}	16–17	Wolstein Center (2,515); Cleveland, OH
*Non-conference game. ^{#}Rankings from AP poll. (#) Tournament seedings in parentheses. All times are in Eastern.
