= 2022–23 Cleveland State Vikings men's basketball team =

American college basketball season

2022–23 Cleveland State Vikings men's basketball

CBI, First Round
- Conference: Horizon League
- Record: 21–14 (14–6 Horizon)
- Head coach: Daniyal Robinson (1st season)
- Assistant coaches: Jermaine Henderson (1st season); Travis Lewis (2nd season); Jay Shunnar (1st season)
- Home arena: Wolstein Center

2022–23 Horizon League men's basketball standings
	Conf.				Overall
Team	W		L	PCT	W		L	PCT
Youngstown State	15	–	5	.750	24	–	10	.706
Milwaukee	14	–	6	.700	22	–	12	.647
Cleveland State	14	–	6	.700	21	–	14	.600
Northern Kentucky †	14	–	6	.700	22	–	13	.629
Oakland	11	–	9	.550	13	–	19	.406
Wright State	10	–	10	.500	18	–	15	.545
Robert Morris	10	–	10	.500	16	–	17	.485
Detroit Mercy	9	–	11	.450	14	–	19	.424
Purdue Fort Wayne	9	–	11	.450	17	–	15	.531
IUPUI	2	–	18	.100	5	–	27	.156
Green Bay	2	–	18	.100	3	–	29	.094
† 2023 Horizon League tournament winner

The 2022–23 Cleveland State Vikings men's basketball team represented the Cleveland State University during the 2022–23 NCAA Division I men's basketball season. The Vikings, led by first-year head coach Daniyal Robinson, played their home games at the Wolstein Center as members of the Horizon League. They finished the season 19–12, 16–6 in Horizon League play to finish in a tie for second place. As the No. 3 seed in the Horizon League tournament, they defeated Robert Morris and Milwaukee before losing to Northern Kentucky in the conference championship game. The Vikings received an automatic bid to the College Basketball Invitational (CBI), where they lost in the first round in overtime to Eastern Kentucky.

== Previous season ==
The Vikings finished the 2021-22 season as Horizon League regular season co-champions with a record of 20–11, including 15–6 in conference play. They won in the opening round of the Horizon League tournament against tenth-seeded Robert Morris before losing to fourth seed Wright State. They received an invite to the 2022 National Invitation Tournament, where they lost in the first round to second-seeded Xavier.

== Offseason ==
=== Departures ===
Cleveland State departures
Name	Number	Pos.	Height	Weight	Year	Hometown	Reason for departure
Craig Beaudion	3	G	6'3"	170	Sophomore	Chicago, IL	Transferred to UMBC
Algevon Eichelberger	12	F	6'8"	250	Senior	Saginaw, MI	Graduated
Aria Eskandari	20	G	6'3"	190	Senior	Sanford, FL	Transferred to Southern Wesleyan
Broc Finstuen	23	G	6'4"	200	Senior	Pine Island, MN	Graduated
Tre Gomillion	5	G	6'4"	215	Senior	Augusta, GA	Transferred to Missouri
Chris Greene	13	F	6'8"	210	Senior	Newport News, VA	Transferred to Arkansas–Pine Bluff
D'Moi Hodge	55	G	6'4"	180	Senior	Tortola, British Virgin Islands	Transferred to Missouri
Nathanel Jack	0	G	6'5"	195	Senior	Mississauga, Ontario	Graduated
Mabor Majak	50	C	7'2"	230	Sophomore	Biemnom, South Sudan	Transferred to Missouri
Anderson Mirambeaux	15	F	6'6"	305	Junior	Santo Domingo, Dominican Republic	Transferred to Miami (OH)
Torey Patton	24	G	6'5"	195	Senior	Dayton, OH	Graduated
Jeremy Sanchez	21	G	6'0"	170	Junior	North Ridgeville, OH	Transferred to Saint Leo
Ben Sternberg	31	G	6'0"	152	Senior	Cleveland, OH	Transferred to Missouri
Demetrius Terry	1	G	6'0"	175	Sophomore	Cleveland, OH	Transferred to Lamar CC

=== Incoming transfers ===
Cleveland State incoming transfers
Name	Number	Pos.	Height	Weight	Year	Hometown	Previous school
Tristan Enaruna	13	F	6'8"	220	Junior	Almere, Netherlands	Iowa State
Drew Lowder	55	G	6'1"	175	Junior	Jackson, MI	Lansing CC
Paxton Payne	15	G	6'2"	190	Junior	Cookeville, TN	Kansas City
JaMir Price	5	G	6'3"	170	Sophomore	Rock Island, IL	Mineral Area
Chase Robinson	22	G	6'1"		Junior	Matteson, IL	Illinois Springfield
Tae Williams	1	G/F	6'7"	205	Junior	Chicago, IL	John A. Logan

=== 2022 recruiting class ===
College recruiting
Name	Hometown	School	Height	Weight	Commit date
Dylan Arnett; F	Chicago, IL	DePaul College Prep	6 ft 9 in (2.06 m)	230 lb (100 kg)	Jun 7, 2022
Dylan Arnett; F	Recruit ratings: No ratings found				
Jason Drake; G	Detroit, MI	Ferndale	6 ft 2 in (1.88 m)	190 lb (86 kg)	May 26, 2022
Jason Drake; G	Recruit ratings: No ratings found				
Ramar Pryor; G	Canton, OH	St. Vincent-St. Mary	6 ft 3 in (1.91 m)	190 lb (86 kg)	May 16, 2022
Ramar Pryor; G	Recruit ratings: No ratings found				
Overall recruit ranking:
Note: In many cases, Scout, Rivals, 247Sports, On3, and ESPN may conflict in their listings of height and weight.; In these cases, the average was taken. ESPN grades are on a 100-point scale.; Sources: "2022 Team Ranking". Rivals.

== Preseason ==
The Vikings were picked to finish in seventh place in the Horizon League in the coaches' poll, receiving a total of 188 points.

== Roster ==
2022–23 Cleveland State Vikings men's basketball team
Players
Coaches

Pos.	#	Name	Height	Weight	Year	Previous school	Hometown
G	0	Jason Drake II	6 ft 2 in (1.88 m)	190 lb (86 kg)	RS Fr	Ferndale	Detroit, Michigan
G/F	1	Tae Williams	6 ft 7 in (2.01 m)	205 lb (93 kg)	RS Jr	John A. Logan	Chicago, Illinois
G	2	Yahel Hill	6 ft 0 in (1.83 m)	170 lb (77 kg)	RS Sr	Tallahassee CC	Cleveland Heights, Ohio
G	3	Deshon Parker	6 ft 4 in (1.93 m)	195 lb (88 kg)	RS Sr	Wayne	Dayton, Ohio
F	4	Cole Middleton	6 ft 6 in (1.98 m)	220 lb (100 kg)	RS So	Pace	Atlanta, Georgia
G	5	JaMir Price	6 ft 3 in (1.91 m)	170 lb (77 kg)	RS So	Mineral Area	Rock Island, Illinois
F	11	Jayson Woodrich	6 ft 7 in (2.01 m)	195 lb (88 kg)	RS Jr	Beachwood High School	Beachwood, Ohio
F	12	Dylan Arnett	6 ft 9 in (2.06 m)	230 lb (104 kg)	RS Fr	DePaul College Prep	Chicago, Illinois
F	13	Tristan Enaruna	6 ft 8 in (2.03 m)	220 lb (100 kg)	RS So	Iowa State	Almere, Netherlands
G	15	Paxton Payne	6 ft 2 in (1.88 m)	190 lb (86 kg)	RS Jr	Kansas City	Cookeville, Tennessee
G	20	Ramar Pryor	6 ft 3 in (1.91 m)	190 lb (86 kg)	RS Fr	St. Vincent-St. Mary	Canton, Ohio
G	22	Chase Robinson	6 ft 1 in (1.85 m)	—	RS Jr	Illinois Springfield	Matteson, Illinois
F	35	Deante Johnson	6 ft 9 in (2.06 m)	210 lb (95 kg)	RS Sr	Edison	Detroit, Michigan
G	55	Drew Louder	6 ft 1 in (1.85 m)	175 lb (79 kg)	RS Jr	Lansing CC	Jackson, Michigan

Head coach

- Daniyal Robinson (Little Rock)

Assistant coach(es)

- Jermaine Henderson (Miami (OH))
- Travis Lewis (Eastern Michigan)
- Jay Shunnar (Michigan)

Legend

- (C) Team captain
- (S) Suspended
- (I) Ineligible
- (W) Walk-on
- Injured
- Current redshirt

Roster
Last update: December 3, 2022

== Schedule and results ==
Date time, TV	Rank^{#}	Opponent^{#}	Result	Record	High points	High rebounds	High assists	Site (attendance) city, state
Exhibition
November 3, 2022*		Baldwin Wallace	W 74–52		–	–	–	Wolstein Center; Cleveland, OH
Regular season
November 7, 2022*; 7:00 pm, ESPN+		Notre Dame (OH)	L 68–72	0–1	20 – Enaruna	11 – Enaruna	11 – Parker	Wolstein Center (1,549); Cleveland, OH
November 10, 2022*; 8:00 pm, ESPN+		at Cincinnati	L 58–69	0-2	15 – Enaruna	8 – Parker	5 – Parker	Fifth Third Arena (9,227); Cincinnati, OH
November 12, 2022*; 1:00 pm, ESPN3		at Ohio	L 70–81	0–3	20 – Hill	8 – Johnson	7 – Parker	Convocation Center (5,626); Athens, OH
November 16, 2022*; 7:00 pm, ESPN+		at Canisius	W 58–57 ^{OT}	1–3	15 – Enaruna	10 – Enaruna	8 – Parker	Koessler Athletic Center (766); Buffalo, NY
November 18, 2022*; 7:00 pm, ESPN+		Arkansas–Pine Bluff; Turkey Slam	W 67–58	2–3	12 – Woodrich	11 – Enaruna	4 – Lowder	Wolstein Center (2,073); Cleveland, OH
November 23, 2022*; 1:00 pm, ESPN+		Chicago State; Turkey Slam	W 77–63	3–3	14 – Enaruna	6 – Johnson	6 – Parker	Wolstein Center (1,500); Cleveland, OH
November 26, 2022*; 12:00 pm, ESPN3		at Western Michigan	W 71–49	4–3	15 – Lowder	5 – Woodrich	6 – Williams	University Arena (1,422); Kalamazoo, MI
December 1, 2022; 7:00 pm, ESPN+		Oakland	W 80–64	5–3 (1–0)	16 – Lowder	12 – Johnson	6 – Parker	Wolstein Center (1,671); Cleveland, OH
December 3, 2022; 3:00 pm, ESPN+		Detroit Mercy	W 92–77	6–3 (2–0)	23 – Williams	10 – Williams	6 – Parker	Wolstein Center (1,409); Cleveland, OH
December 7, 2022*; 7:00 pm, ESPN+		at St. Bonaventure	L 42–61	6–4	8 – Johnson	6 – Tied	2 – Tied	Reilly Center (3,158); Olean, NY
December 10, 2022*; 3:00 pm, ESPN+		Kent State	L 58–67	6–5	20 – Johnson	9 – Johnson	5 – Parker	Wolstein Center (2,120); Cleveland, OH
December 18, 2022*; 5:00 pm, WCCN		at Loyola Marymount	L 59–70	6–6	15 – Parker	9 – Williams	3 – Parker	Gersten Pavilion (723); Los Angeles, CA
December 21, 2022*; 7:00 pm, ESPN+		Mount St. Joseph	W 78–48	7–6	18 – Lowder	8 – Tied	5 – Arnett	Wolstein Center (1,500); Cleveland, OH
December 29, 2022; 8:00 pm, ESPN+		at Youngstown State	L 71–85	7–7 (2–1)	18 – Tied	8 – Enaruna	6 – Parker	Beeghly Center (3,031); Youngstown, OH
December 31, 2022; 3:00 pm, ESPN+		at Robert Morris	W 63–54	8–7 (3–1)	18 – Enaruna	6 – Woodrich	2 – Lowder	UPMC Events Center (616); Moon Township, PA
January 5, 2023; 7:00 pm, ESPN+		Milwaukee	L 64–68 ^{OT}	8–8 (3–2)	16 – Enaruna	13 – Williams	5 – Parker	Wolstein Center (1,541); Cleveland, OH
January 7, 2023; 3:00 pm, ESPN+		Green Bay	W 82–77	9–8 (4–2)	20 – Enaruna	8 – Williams	3 – Tied	Wolstein Center (1,906); Cleveland, OH
January 14, 2023; 12:00 pm, ESPN+		at IUPUI	W 89–54	10–8 (5–2)	18 – Enaruna	7 – Johnson	4 – Tied	Indiana Farmers Coliseum (761); Indianapolis, IN
January 16, 2023; 7:00 pm, ESPN+		at Purdue Fort Wayne	W 72–60	11–8 (6–2)	24 – Enaruna	12 – Enaruna	4 – Lowder	Hilliard Gates Sports Center (1,327); Fort Wayne, IN
January 19, 2023; 7:00 pm, ESPN+		at Northern Kentucky	L 56–57	11–9 (6–3)	15 – Enaruna	7 – Tied	3 – Parker	Truist Arena (2,862); Highland Heights, KY
January 21, 2023; 7:00 pm, ESPN+		at Wright State	W 85–77	12–9 (7–3)	21 – Enaruna	9 – Enaruna	3 – Tied	Nutter Center (4,054); Fairborn, OH
January 27, 2023; 7:00 pm, ESPN+		Purdue Fort Wayne	W 79–74	13–9 (8–3)	19 – Enaruna	12 – Johnson	5 – Enaruna	Wolstein Center (2,088); Cleveland, OH
January 29, 2023; 3:00 pm, ESPN+		IUPUI	W 78–72	14–9 (9–3)	15 – Tied	8 – Williams	9 – Johnson	Wolstein Center (1,738); Cleveland, OH
February 2, 2023; 7:00 pm, ESPN+		at Detroit Mercy	L 67–85	14–10 (9–4)	18 – Enaruna	10 – Johnson	3 – Lowder	Calihan Hall (1,113); Detroit, MI
February 4, 2023; 1:00 pm, ESPN+		at Oakland	L 89–92 ^{OT}	14–11 (9–5)	25 – Enaruna	8 – Enaruna	5 – Enaruna	Athletics Center O'Rena (3,185); Auburn Hills, MI
February 10, 2023; 7:00 pm, ESPN+		Robert Morris	W 57–55	15–11 (10–5)	12 – Parker	10 – Johnson	3 – Parker	Wolstein Center (1,901); Cleveland, OH
February 12, 2023; 1:00 pm, ESPN+		Youngstown State	W 81–78	16–11 (11–5)	20 – Williams	9 – Johnson	3 – Parker	Wolstein Center (2,023); Cleveland, OH
February 17, 2023; 7:00 pm, ESPN+		Wright State	W 85–68	17–11 (12–5)	20 – Enaruna	11 – Enaruna	4 – Tied	Wolstein Center (2,902); Cleveland, OH
February 19, 2023; 3:00 pm, ESPN+		Northern Kentucky	W 64–63	18–11 (13–5)	16 – Johnson	10 – Johnson	5 – Parker	Wolstein Center (1,805); Cleveland, OH
February 23, 2023; 9:00 pm, ESPN+		at Green Bay	W 76–65	19–11 (14–5)	30 – Williams	14 – Williams	8 – Parker	Kress Events Center (1,305); Green Bay, WI
February 25, 2023; 8:00 pm, ESPN+		at Milwaukee	L 72–81	19–12 (14–6)	24 – Enaruna	11 – Tied	4 – Parker	UWM Panther Arena (3,334); Milwaukee, WI
Horizon League tournament
March 2, 2023; 7:00 pm, ESPN+	(3)	(6) Robert Morris; Quarterfinals	W 75–70 ^{OT}	20–12	23 – Enaruna	7 – Enaruna	5 – Parker	Wolstein Center (2,515); Cleveland, OH
March 6, 2023; 9:30 pm, ESPN2	(3)	vs. (2) Milwaukee; Semifinals	W 93–80	21–12	26 – Enaruna	9 – Tied	6 – Parker	Indiana Farmers Coliseum; Indianapolis, IN
March 7, 2023; 7:00 pm, ESPN	(3)	vs. (4) Northern Kentucky; Championship	L 61–63	21–13	17 – Enaruna	10 – Johnson	6 – Parker	Indiana Farmers Coliseum; Indianapolis, IN
College Basketball Invitational
March 19, 2023; 12:00 p.m., FloHoops	(9)	vs. (8) Eastern Kentucky; First round	L 75–91 ^{OT}	21–14	15 – Williams	9 – Johnson	3 – Tied	Ocean Center; Daytona Beach, FL
*Non-conference game. ^{#}Rankings from AP Poll. (#) Tournament seedings in parentheses. All times are in Eastern.
