= 2022–23 IUPUI Jaguars men's basketball team =

American college basketball season

2022–2023 IUPUI Jaguars men's basketball
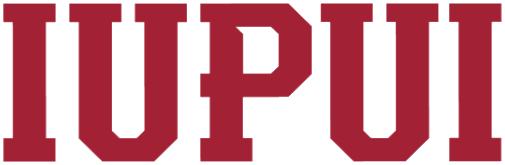
- Conference: Horizon League
- Record: 5–27 (2–18 Horizon)
- Head coach: Matt Crenshaw (2nd season)
- Assistant coaches: Antwain Banks (2nd season); Tommy Strine (2nd season); Kente' Hart (1st season)
- Home arena: Indiana Farmers Coliseum; IUPUI Gymnasium

2022–23 Horizon League men's basketball standings
	Conf.				Overall
Team	W		L	PCT	W		L	PCT
Youngstown State	15	–	5	.750	24	–	10	.706
Milwaukee	14	–	6	.700	22	–	12	.647
Cleveland State	14	–	6	.700	21	–	14	.600
Northern Kentucky †	14	–	6	.700	22	–	13	.629
Oakland	11	–	9	.550	13	–	19	.406
Wright State	10	–	10	.500	18	–	15	.545
Robert Morris	10	–	10	.500	16	–	17	.485
Detroit Mercy	9	–	11	.450	14	–	19	.424
Purdue Fort Wayne	9	–	11	.450	17	–	15	.531
IUPUI	2	–	18	.100	5	–	27	.156
Green Bay	2	–	18	.100	3	–	29	.094
† 2023 Horizon League tournament winner

The 2022–23 IUPUI Jaguars men's basketball team represented Indiana University–Purdue University Indianapolis in the 2022–23 NCAA Division I men's basketball season. The Jaguars, led by second-year head coach Matt Crenshaw, played their home games at Indiana Farmers Coliseum in Indianapolis, Indiana as members of the Horizon League. They finished the season 5–27, 2–18 in Horizon League play to finish in a tie for last place. As the No. 11 seed in the Horizon League tournament, they lost Robert Morris in the first round.

== Previous season ==
The Jaguars finished the 2021–22 season 3–26, 1–16 in Horizon League play to finish in last in the conference. They lost in the first round of the Horizon League tournament to Oakland.

== Offseason ==
=== Departures ===
Departures
Name	Pos.	Height	Weight	Year	Hometown	Notes
Mike DePersia	G	5'11	175	Junior	Cherry Hill, NJ	Transferred to Le Moyne
Bobby Harvey	G	6'3	200	Senior	Chicago, IL	Transferred to Portland State
Chuks Isitua	C	6'11	220	Freshman	Lagos, Nigeria	Transferred to Fresno State
Bakari Lastrap	G	6'0	170	Sophomore	Houston, TX	Transferred to Blinn College
BJ Maxwell	G/F	6'5	200	Graduate Student	Austin, TX	Graduated
Nathan McClure	G	6'4	175	Junior	Houston, TX	Transferred to Le Moyne
Dimitar Pandev	F	6'10	225	Junior	Strumica, North Macedonia	Left team for personal reasons
KJ Pruitt	G	6'4	200	Freshman	Lewisville, TX	Transferred to Trinity Valley Community College

=== Incoming transfers ===
Transfers
Name	Pos.	Height	Weight	Year	Hometown	Previous school
Jlynn Counter	G	6'3	185	Sophomore	Oklahoma City, OK	Northern Oklahoma College-Enid
Cooper Dewitt	G/F	6'6	195	Junior	Pasco, WA	North Idaho College
John Egbuta	F	6'6	215	Junior	New York, NY	Albany Tech
Daylan Hamilton	G	6'3	180	Junior	Houston, TX	Triton College
Bryce Monroe	G	5'11	170	Junior	San Francisco, CA	San Diego
Chris Osten	F	6'9	215	Graduate Student	Crowley, LA	Northern Illinois

=== Recruiting class ===
College recruiting information
Name	Hometown	School	Height	Weight	Commit date
Vincent Brady II; SF	Indianapolis, IN	Cathedral High School	6 ft 4 in (1.93 m)	185 lb (84 kg)	Jun 6, 2022
Vincent Brady II; SF	Recruit ratings: 247Sports: (NR)				
DJ Jackson; SG	Mississauga, Ontario	Montverde Academy	6 ft 4 in (1.93 m)	175 lb (79 kg)	Apr 14, 2022
DJ Jackson; SG	Recruit ratings: Scout: Rivals: 247Sports: (NR)				
Amhad Jarrard; SG	Indianapolis, IN	Mt Vernon High School	6 ft 4 in (1.93 m)	180 lb (82 kg)	Nov 9, 2021
Amhad Jarrard; SG	Recruit ratings: Scout: Rivals: 247Sports: (NR)				
Armon Jarrard; PG	Indianapolis, IN	Mt Vernon High School	6 ft 3 in (1.91 m)	170 lb (77 kg)	Nov 9, 2021
Armon Jarrard; PG	Recruit ratings: Scout: Rivals: 247Sports: (NR)				
Overall recruit ranking:
Note: In many cases, Scout, Rivals, 247Sports, On3, and ESPN may conflict in their listings of height and weight.; In these cases, the average was taken. ESPN grades are on a 100-point scale.; Sources: "2022 Team Ranking". Rivals.

== Roster ==
2022–23 IUPUI Jaguars men's basketball team
Players
Coaches

Pos.	#	Name	Height	Weight	Year	Hometown
G	0	Jlynn Counter	6 ft 3 in (1.91 m)	185 lb (84 kg)	So	Oklahoma City, Oklahoma
G	1	Vincent Brady II	6 ft 4 in (1.93 m)	185 lb (84 kg)	Fr	Indianapolis, Indiana
F	2	John Egbuta	6 ft 6 in (1.98 m)	215 lb (98 kg)	Jr	New York City, New York
G	4	Bryce Monroe	5 ft 11 in (1.8 m)	170 lb (77 kg)	Jr	San Francisco, California
G	5	Amhad Jarrard	6 ft 4 in (1.93 m)	180 lb (82 kg)	Fr	Indianapolis, Indiana
G/F	10	Cooper Dewitt	6 ft 6 in (1.98 m)	195 lb (88 kg)	Jr	Pasco, Washington
G	11	Daylan Hamilton	6 ft 3 in (1.91 m)	180 lb (82 kg)	Jr	Houston, Texas
G	12	Armon Jarrard	6 ft 3 in (1.91 m)	170 lb (77 kg)	Fr	Indianapolis, Indiana
G	13	DJ Jackson	6 ft 4 in (1.93 m)	175 lb (79 kg)	Fr	Mississauga, Ontario
G	14	Braden Allen (W)	6 ft 3 in (1.91 m)	170 lb (77 kg)	Fr	Brazil, Indiana
F	15	Zach Gunn	6 ft 6 in (1.98 m)	210 lb (95 kg)	GS	Fishers, Indiana
F	20	Derek Peterson	6 ft 2 in (1.88 m)	175 lb (79 kg)	RS Fr	Greenwood, Indiana
G	22	Kaleb Edwards	6 ft 3 in (1.91 m)	175 lb (79 kg)	RS Fr	Fishers, Indiana
F	23	Chris Osten	6 ft 9 in (2.06 m)	215 lb (98 kg)	GS	Crowley, Louisiana
F	24	Jonah Carrasco	6 ft 9 in (2.06 m)	220 lb (100 kg)	GS	Wichita, Kansas
G	25	Boston Stanton III	6 ft 5 in (1.96 m)	190 lb (86 kg)	So	Denver, Colorado
G	30	Caleb Crane (W)	6 ft 2 in (1.88 m)	190 lb (86 kg)	RS Fr	Avon, Indiana
G	31	Bobby Wonnell (W)	6 ft 2 in (1.88 m)	165 lb (75 kg)	Fr	Indianapolis, Indiana

Head coach

- Matt Crenshaw (IUPUI)

Assistant coach(es)

- Antwain Banks (Kentucky State)
- Tommy Strine (Anderson (IN))
- Kente' Hart (Purdue)

Legend

- (C) Team captain
- (S) Suspended
- (I) Ineligible
- (W) Walk-on
- Injured
- Current redshirt

Roster

== Schedule and results ==
Date time, TV	Rank^{#}	Opponent^{#}	Result	Record	High points	High rebounds	High assists	Site (attendance) city, state
Exhibition
October 27, 2022*; 7:00 pm		Brescia	W 101–60	–	16 – Jackson	9 – Hamilton	7 – Am. Jarrard	IUPUI Gymnasium (484); Indianapolis, IN
Regular season
November 7, 2022*; 8:00 pm, ESPN+		at Iowa State	L 39–88	0–1	16 – Counter	4 – Tied	2 – Counter	Hilton Coliseum (12,562); Ames, IA
November 9, 2022*; 7:00 pm, ESPN+		at Drake	L 48–80	0–2	12 – Hamilton	6 – Jackson	2 – Tied	Knapp Center (2,845); Des Moines, IA
November 14, 2022*; 8:00 pm, FloSports		at Chicago State	L 58–68	0–3	17 – Counter	12 – Osten	2 – Egbuta	Jones Convocation Center (219); Chicago, IL
November 19, 2022*; 12:00 pm, ESPN+		Franklin College	W 59–45	1–3	11 – Ar. Jarrard	7 – Tied	6 – Counter	Indiana Farmers Coliseum (942); Indianapolis, IN
November 23, 2022*; 4:00 pm		vs. Denver; Big Easy Classic	L 64–86	1–4	16 – Counter	10 – Osten	2 – Tied	Lakefront Arena (546); New Orleans, LA
November 24, 2022*; 2:00 pm, ESPN+		at New Orleans; Big Easy Classic	L 84–87	1–5	29 – Monroe	10 – Osten	7 – Monroe	Lakefront Arena (715); New Orleans, LA
November 25, 2022*; 4:00 pm		vs. The Citadel; Big Easy Classic	L 53–74	1–6	8 – Ar. Jarrard	5 – Tied	5 – Monroe	Lakefront Arena (254); New Orleans, LA
December 3, 2022; 8:00 pm, ESPN+		at Milwaukee	L 61–74	1–7 (0–1)	18 – Brady II	7 – Osten	7 – Counter	UW–Milwaukee Panther Arena (1,322); Milwaukee, WI
December 5, 2022; 3:00 pm, ESPN+		at Green Bay	L 61–68	1–8 (0–2)	17 – Brady II	8 – Counter	4 – Brady II	Gentry Complex (4,290); Green Bay, WI
December 12, 2022*; 11:00 am, ESPN+		Spalding University	W 75–53	2–8	19 – Osten	6 – Carrasco	6 – Am. Jarrard	Indiana Farmers Coliseum (4,114); Indianapolis, IN
December 17, 2022*; 12:00 pm, ESPN+		Eastern Illinois	L 59–70	2–9	16 – Brady II	7 – Tied	4 – Counter	Indiana Farmers Coliseum (734); Indianapolis, IN
December 19, 2022; 4:00 pm, ESPN+		Southern Indiana; Indiana Classic Tournament	L 74–87	2–10	27 – Counter	5 – Counter	1 – Tied	Memorial Coliseum (176); Fort Wayne, IN
December 20, 2022; 4:00 pm, ESPN+		Texas A&M–Commerce; Indiana Classic Tournament	W 62–52	3–10	23 – Counter	7 – Stanton III	4 – Hamilton	Memorial Coliseum (143); Fort Wayne, IN
December 31, 2022; 2:00 pm, ESPN+		Northern Kentucky	L 44–55	3–11 (0–3)	13 – Brady II	11 – Osten	2 – Taylor	Indiana Farmers Coliseum (710); Indianapolis, IN
January 2, 2023; 2:00 pm, ESPN+		Wright State	L 68–82	3–12 (0–4)	15 – Osten	5 – Brady II	3 – Counter	Indiana Farmers Coliseum (742); Indianapolis, IN
January 7, 2023; 2:00 pm, ESPN+		at Youngstown State	L 74–105	3–13 (0–5)	19 – Osten	10 – Osten	7 – Counter	Beeghly Center (1,747); Youngstown, OH
January 9, 2023; 7:00 pm, ESPN+		at Robert Morris	L 70–74	3–14 (0–6)	21 – Osten	6 – Tied	5 – Am. Jarrard	UPMC Events Center (1,182); Moon, PA
January 12, 2023; 7:00 pm, ESPN+		Purdue Fort Wayne	L 55–70	3–15 (0–7)	12 – Osten	8 – Osten	5 – Counter	Indiana Farmers Coliseum (795); Indianapolis, IN
January 14, 2023; 12:00 pm, ESPN+		Cleveland State	L 54–89	3–16 (0–8)	15 – Egbuta	5 – Brady	6 – Counter	Indiana Farmers Coliseum (761); Indianapolis, IN
January 19, 2023; 7:00 pm, ESPN+		Oakland	L 77–83 ^{OT}	3–17 (0–9)	23 – Brady	6 – Tied	7 – Counter	Indiana Farmers Coliseum (818); Indianapolis, IN
January 21, 2023; 12:00 pm, ESPN+		Detroit Mercy	L 77–89	3–18 (0–10)	23 – Counter	7 – Jackson	5 – Counter	Indiana Farmers Coliseum (1,101); Indianapolis, IN
January 25, 2023; 7:00 pm, ESPN+		at Purdue Fort Wayne	L 75–81	3–19 (0–11)	27 – Counter	5 – Tied	3 – Carrasco	Hilliard Gates Sports Center (874); Fort Wayne, IN
January 29, 2023; 7:00 pm, ESPN+		at Cleveland State	L 72–78	3–20 (0–12)	22 – Ar. Jarrard	8 – Carrasco	5 – Brady II	Wolstein Center (1,738); Cleveland, OH
February 2, 2023; 11:00 am, ESPN+		Milwaukee	L 69–72	3–21 (0–13)	22 – Counter	7 – Tied	7 – Counter	Indiana Farmers Coliseum; Indianapolis, IN
February 4, 2023; 12:00 pm, ESPN+		Green Bay	W 68–53	4–21 (1–13)	16 – Jackson	6 – Jackson	9 – Counter	Indiana Farmers Coliseum (752); Indianapolis, IN
February 8, 2023; 7:00 pm, ESPN+		at Wright State	L 71–103	4–22 (1–14)	22 – Counter	8 – Counter	3 – Brady II	Nutter Center (3,267); Fairborn, OH
February 12, 2023; 1:00 pm, ESPN+		at Northern Kentucky	L 47–86	4–23 (1–15)	17 – Brady II	5 – Carrasco	4 – Am. Jarrard	Truist Arena (2,554); Highland Heights, KY
February 15, 2023; 7:00 pm, ESPN+		at Oakland	L 81–85	4–24 (1–16)	23 – Jackson	7 – Counter	3 – Tied	Athletics Center O'rena (1,734); Auburn Hills, MI
February 19, 2023; 1:00 pm, ESPN+		at Detroit Mercy	L 68–81	4–25 (1–17)	13 – Brady II	5 – Tied	3 – Tied	Calihan Hall (1,917); Detroit, MI
February 23, 2023; 7:30 pm, ESPN+		Robert Morris	W 81–75	5–25 (2–17)	24 – Jackson	12 – Jackson	3 – Counter	Indiana Farmers Coliseum (1,189); Indianapolis, IN
February 25, 2023; 7:00 pm, ESPN+		Youngstown State	L 79–93	5–26 (2–18)	20 – Counter	5 – Tied	5 – Carrasco	The Jungle (775); Indianapolis, IN
Horizon League tournament
February 28, 2023; 7:00 pm, ESPN+	(11)	at (6) Robert Morris; First round	L 64–67	5–27	25 – Counter	8 – Jackson	2 – Tied	UPMC Events Center (1,214); Moon, PA
*Non-conference game. ^{#}Rankings from AP Poll. (#) Tournament seedings in parentheses. All times are in Central.
