= List of Green Bay Phoenix basketball seasons =

This is a list of the seasons completed by the Green Bay Phoenix men's basketball and women's basketball team. Green Bay has fielded a men's college basketball team since 1969 and a women's college basketball team since 1973.

The men's basketball team has played in the Horizon League since 1994, having formerly participated in the Mid-Continent Conference from 1982 to 1994.

The women's basketball team formerly played in the Wisconsin Intercollegiate Athletic Conference, the North Star Conference, and the Mid-Continent Conference before joining the Horizon League in 1994.

== Men's basketball seasons ==
Record table
Season	Coach	Overall	Conference	Standing	Postseason
Dave Buss (Independent) (1981–1982)
1981–82	Dave Buss	14–13	N/A		
Dick Lien (Mid-Continent Conference) (1982–1985)
1982–83	Dick Lien	9–19	2–11	8th	
1983–84	Dick Lien	9–19	5–9	6th	
1984–85	Dick Lien	4–24	1–13	8th	
Dick Lien:		22–62	8–33		
Dick Bennett (Mid-Continent Conference) (1985–1994)
1985–86	Dick Bennett	5–23	3–11	7th	
1986–87	Dick Bennett	15–14	8–6	4th	
1987–88	Dick Bennett	18–9	9–5	3rd	
1988–89	Dick Bennett	14–14	6–6	4th	
1989–90	Dick Bennett	24–8	9–3	2nd	
1990–91	Dick Bennett	24–7	13–3	2nd	NCAA First Round
1991–92	Dick Bennett	25–5	14–2	1st	
1992-93	Dick Bennett	13–14	9–7	4th	
1993–94	Dick Bennett	27–7	15–3	1st	NCAA Second Round
Dick Bennett (Midwestern Collegiate Conference) (1994–1995)
1994–95	Dick Bennett	22–8	11–4	T–2nd	NCAA First Round
Dick Bennett:		187–109	97–50		
Mike Heideman (Midwestern Collegiate Conference) (1995–2002)
1995–96	Mike Heideman	25–4	16–0	1st	NCAA First Round
1996–97	Mike Heideman	14–14	10–6	4th	
1997–98	Mike Heideman	17–12	7–7	4th	
1998–99	Mike Heideman	20–11	9–5	3rd	
1999–2000	Mike Heideman	14–16	6–8	4th	
2000–01	Mike Heideman	11–17	4–10	7th	
2001–02	Mike Heideman	9–21	4–12	8th	
Mike Heidman:		110–95	56–48		
Tod Kowalczyk (Horizon League) (2002–2010)
2002–03	Green Bay	10–20	4–12	T–6th	
2003–04	Green Bay	17–11	11–5	3rd	
2004–05	Green Bay	17–11	10–6	2nd	
2005–06	Green Bay	15–16	8–8	T–3rd	
2006–07	Green Bay	18–15	7–9	T–4th	
2007–08	Green Bay	15–15	9–9	T–6th	
2008–09	Green Bay	22–11	13–5	2nd	CBI first round
2009–10	Green Bay	22–13	11–7	3rd	CBI second round
Green Bay:		136–112 (.548)	73–61 (.545)		
Brian Wardle (Horizon League) (2010–2015)
2010–11	Green Bay	14–18	8–10	7th	
2011–12	Green Bay	15–15	10–8	T–6th	
2012–13	Green Bay	18–16	10–6	T–3rd	CIT First Round
2013–14	Green Bay	24–7	14–2	1st	NIT First Round
2014–15	Green Bay	24–9	12–4	2nd	NIT First Round
Green Bay:		95–65 (.594)	54–30 (.643)		
Linc Darner (Horizon League) (2015–2020)
2015–16	Green Bay	23–13	11–7	4th	NCAA First Round
2016–17	Green Bay	18–14	12–6	T–3rd	CBI First Round
2017–18	Green Bay	13–20	7–11	7th	
2018–19	Green Bay	21–17	10–8	4th	CIT Runner-up
2019–20	Green Bay	17–16	11–7	3rd	
Green Bay:		92–80 (.535)	51–39 (.567)		
Will Ryan (Horizon League) (2020–2022)
2020–21	Green Bay	8–17	8–12	7th	
2021–22	Green Bay	5–25	4–16	11th	
Will Ryan/Freddie Owens (Horizon) (2022–2023)
2022–23	Green Bay	3–29	2–18	T-10th	(Note: Ryan was fired after the team started 2–19 (1–9). Owens went 1–10 (1–9) to finish the year.)
Green Bay:		15–61 (.197) (Ryan); 1–10 (.091) (Owens)	13–37 (.260) (Ryan); 1–9 (.100) (Owens)		
Sundance Wicks (Horizon) (2023–2024)
2023–24	Green Bay	18–14	13–7	T-3rd	
Sundance Wicks:		18–14 (.563)	13–7 (.650)		
Doug Gottlieb (Horizon) (2024–2025)
2024–25	Green Bay	4–28	2–18	11th	
2025–26	Green Bay	18–15	12–8	T–3rd	
Doug Gottlieb:		22–43 (.338)	14–26 (.350)		
Total:		969–754 (.562)			
National champion Postseason invitational champion Conference regular season champion Conference regular season and conference tournament champion Division regular season champion Division regular season and conference tournament champion Conference tournament champion

== Women's basketball seasons ==
Record table
Season	Team	Overall	Conference	Standing	Postseason
Carol Hammerle (1973–1997)
1973–74	Carol Hammerle	3–9	–		
1974–75	Carol Hammerle	8–9	–		
1975–76	Carol Hammerle	7–12	–		
1976–77	Carol Hammerle	4–17	–		
1977–78	Carol Hammerle	14–9	–		
1978–79	Carol Hammerle	17–7	–		
AIAW Division II/Independent
1979–80	Carol Hammerle	18–9	–		MAIAW Regionals
1980–81	Carol Hammerle	24–5	–		MAIAW Regionals
Wisconsin Women's Intercollegiate Athletic Conference
1981–82	Carol Hammerle	27–8	10–0	1st	AIAW DII Quarterfinals
NAIA/WWIAC
1982–83	Carol Hammerle	23–9	5–1	1st	NAIA District
1983–84	Carol Hammerle	24–6	7–3	2nd	NAIA District
Independent
1984–85	Carol Hammerle	24–10	–		NAIA District
1985–86	Carol Hammerle	21–9	–		NAIA Nationals
1986–87	Carol Hammerle	24–6	–		NAIA Final Four
NCAA Division I/Independent
1987–88	Carol Hammerle	22–6	–		
North Star Conference
1988–89	Carol Hammerle	19–10	11–3	3rd	
1989–90	Carol Hammerle	16–13	7–5	3rd	
1990–91	Carol Hammerle	22–6	13–1	1st	
1991–92	Carol Hammerle	24–7	12–0	1st	WNIT First Round
Mid-Continent Conference
1992–93	Carol Hammerle	19–10	14–2	2nd	
1993–94	Carol Hammerle	18–11	13–5	2nd	NCAA First Round
Midwest Collegiate Conference/Horizon League
1994–95	Carol Hammerle	19–9	10–6	T–4th	
1995–96	Carol Hammerle	20–9	14–2	1st	
1996–97	Carol Hammerle	18–11	11–5	3rd	
1997–98	Carol Hammerle	21–9	11–3	2nd	NCAA First Round
Carol Hammerle:		456-226	138-36		
Kevin Borseth (Midwest Collegiate Conference/Horizon League) (1998–2007)
1998–99	Kevin Borseth	19–10	13–1	1st	NCAA First Round
1999–00	Kevin Borseth	21–9	12–2	1st	NCAA First Round
2000–01	Kevin Borseth	22–9	12–2	T–1st	WNIT First Round
2001–02	Kevin Borseth	24–7	15–1	1st	NCAA First Round
2002–03	Kevin Borseth	28–4	15–1	1st	NCAA Second Round
2003–04	Kevin Borseth	23–8	13–3	1st	NCAA First Round
2004–05	Kevin Borseth	27–4	15–1	1st	NCAA First Round
2005–06	Kevin Borseth	23–7	14–2	T–1st	WNIT First Round
2006–07	Kevin Borseth	29–4	16–0	1st	NCAA Second Round
Kevin Borseth (1st stint):		216–62	125–13		
Matt Bollant (Horizon League) (2007–2012)
2007–08	Matt Bollant	26–6	17–1	1st	WNIT First Round
2008–09	Matt Bollant	29–4	18–0	1st	NCAA First Round
2009–10	Matt Bollant	28–5	15–3	1st	NCAA Second Round
2010–11	Matt Bollant	34–2	18–0	1st	NCAA Sweet Sixteen
2011–12	Matt Bollant	31–2	17–1	1st	NCAA Second Round
Matt Bollant:		148–19	85–5		
Kevin Borseth (Horizon League) (2012–2024)
2012–13	Kevin Borseth	29–3	16–0	1st	NCAA First Round
2013–14	Kevin Borseth	22–10	13–3	1st	WNIT First Round
2014–15	Kevin Borseth	28–5	15–1	1st	NCAA First Round
2015–16	Kevin Borseth	28–5	16–2	1st	NCAA First Round
2016–17	Kevin Borseth	27–6	15–3	1st	NCAA First Round
2017–18	Kevin Borseth	29–4	16–2	1st	NCAA First Round
2018–19	Kevin Borseth	22–10	15–3	2nd	WNIT First Round
2019–20	Kevin Borseth	19–13	13–5	T-2nd	
2020–21	Kevin Borseth	15–7	14–4	3rd	
2021–22	Kevin Borseth	20–8	15–4	3rd	WNIT First Round
2022–23	Kevin Borseth	28–6	18–2	1st	WNIT Second Round
2023–24	Kevin Borseth	27–7	17–3	2nd	NCAA First Round
Kevin Borseth (2nd stint):		293–84 (.777)	182–32 (.850)		
Kevin Borseth (Total):		509–146 (.777)	307–45 (.872)		
Kayla Karius (Horizon League) (2024–present)
2024–25	Kayla Karius	29–6	19–1	1st	NCAA First Round
2025–26	Kayla Karius	25–9	17–3	1st	NCAA First Round
Kayla Karius:		54–51 (.514)	36–4 (.900)		
Total:		1,148–398 (.743)			
National champion Postseason invitational champion Conference regular season champion Conference regular season and conference tournament champion Division regular season champion Division regular season and conference tournament champion Conference tournament champion
