= 2024–25 Green Bay Phoenix men's basketball team =

American college basketball season

2024–25 Green Bay Phoenix men's basketball
- Conference: Horizon League
- Record: 4–28 (2–18 Horizon)
- Head coach: Doug Gottlieb (1st season)
- Assistant coaches: Damon Archibald (1st season); Aerick Sanders (1st season); Jordan McCabe (1st season)
- Home arena: Resch Center; Kress Events Center

2024–25 Horizon League men's basketball standings
	Conf.				Overall
Team	W		L	PCT	W		L	PCT
Robert Morris †	15	–	5	.750	26	–	9	.743
Cleveland State	14	–	6	.700	23	–	13	.639
Milwaukee	14	–	6	.700	21	–	11	.656
Youngstown State	13	–	7	.650	21	–	13	.618
Purdue Fort Wayne	12	–	8	.600	19	–	13	.594
Oakland	11	–	9	.550	16	–	18	.471
Northern Kentucky	11	–	9	.550	17	–	16	.515
Wright State	8	–	12	.400	15	–	18	.455
IU Indy	6	–	14	.300	10	–	22	.313
Detroit Mercy	4	–	16	.200	8	–	24	.250
Green Bay	2	–	18	.100	4	–	28	.125
† 2025 Horizon League tournament winner

The 2024–25 Green Bay Phoenix men's basketball team represented the University of Wisconsin–Green Bay during the 2024–25 NCAA Division I men's basketball season. They were led by first-year head coach Doug Gottlieb, and played their home games at Resch Center in Ashwaubenon, Wisconsin and Kress Events Center in Green Bay, Wisconsin as members of the Horizon League.

== Previous season ==
The Phoenix finished the 2023–24 season 18–14, 13–7 in Horizon League play, to finish in a tie for third place. As the No. 3 seed in the Horizon League tournament, they lost to Milwaukee in the quarterfinals.

== Offseason ==
=== Departures ===
Green Bay departures
Name	Number	Pos.	Height	Year	Hometown	Reason for departure
Elijah Jones	1	F	6'7"	Junior	South Holland, IL	Transferred to Charleston
Clarence Cummings III	3	F	6'5"	RS Junior	Orlando, FL	Graduated
Amari Jedkins	5	F	6'7"	RS Freshman	Racine, WI	Transferred to Montana
Matt Blanton	10	G	6'4"	Freshman	Chelsea, MI	Walk-on; transferred to Concordia Ann Arbor
David Douglas Jr.	15	G	6'5"	Freshman	Yorkville, IL	Transferred to Fresno State
Noah Reynolds	21	G	6'3"	Junior	Peoria, IL	Transferred to TCU
Jacob Antchak	22	C	6'8"	Freshman	Langley, British Columbia	Transferred to UBC
Will Eames	23	F	6'7"	GS Senior	Lee's Summit, MO	Graduated
Rich Byhre	34	F	6'8"	RS Senior	Delafield, WI	Transferred to St. Thomas (MN)
Garret Dutro	41	G	6'5"	Freshman	Colfax, CA	Walk-on; transferred to Sierra College

=== Incoming transfers ===
Green Bay incoming transfers
Name	Number	Pos.	Height	Year	Hometown	Previous school
Donovan Santoro	7	F	6'8"	Sophomore	Los Angeles, CA	Providence
Anthony Roy	9	G	6'5"	Senior	Oakland, CA	Langston
Muodubem Muoneke	11	G	6'5"	Junior	Cypress, TX	Abilene Christian
Isaiah Miranda (Note: Miranda was dismissed from the program on December 29.)	14	C	7'1"	RS Sophomore	Castaic, CA	Oklahoma State
Mouhamadou Cissé	77	C	6'10"	Sophomore	Dakar, Senegal	Trinity Valley CC

=== Recruiting classes ===
==== 2024 recruiting class ====
College recruiting information
Name	Hometown	School	Height	Weight	Commit date
Jeremiah Johnson; PG	Norman, OK	Phoenix Prep	6 ft 3 in (1.91 m)	170 lb (77 kg)	Jun 17, 2024
Jeremiah Johnson; PG	Recruit ratings: Rivals: 247Sports: ESPN: (79)				
C.J. O'Hara; SG	Minneapolis, MN	Totino-Grace High School	6 ft 4 in (1.93 m)	180 lb (82 kg)	Jun 7, 2024
C.J. O'Hara; SG	Recruit ratings: Rivals: 247Sports: ESPN: (80)				
Caden Wilkins; SF	Bettendorf, IA	Bettendorf High School	6 ft 6 in (1.98 m)	200 lb (91 kg)	Jul 6, 2024
Caden Wilkins; SF	Recruit ratings: Rivals: 247Sports: ESPN: (N/A)				
Bennett Basich; SG	Hartland, WI	Arrowhead High School	6 ft 4 in (1.93 m)	180 lb (82 kg)	Jul 10, 2023
Bennett Basich; SG	Recruit ratings: Rivals: 247Sports: ESPN: (N/A)				
Roee Oselka; F/C	Givatayim, Israel	Hapoel Holon B.C.	6 ft 10 in (2.08 m)	210 lb (95 kg)	Jun 17, 2024
Roee Oselka; F/C	Recruit ratings: Rivals: 247Sports: ESPN: (N/A)				
Ben Tweedy; PG	Queensland, Australia	Rockhampton Cyclones	6 ft 2 in (1.88 m)	188 lb (85 kg)	Jul 12, 2024
Ben Tweedy; PG	Recruit ratings: Rivals: 247Sports: ESPN: (N/A)				
Overall recruit ranking: Rivals: — 247Sports: 140 ESPN: —
Note: In many cases, Scout, Rivals, 247Sports, On3, and ESPN may conflict in their listings of height and weight.; In these cases, the average was taken. ESPN grades are on a 100-point scale.; Sources: "Green Bay 2024 Basketball Commitments". Rivals.; "2024 Green Bay Phoenix Recruiting Class". ESPN.; "2024 Team Ranking". Rivals.

==== 2025 recruiting class ====
There are no current recruits for 2025.

== Roster ==
2024–25 Green Bay Phoenix men's basketball team
Players
Coaches

Pos.	#	Name	Height	Weight	Year	Previous school	Hometown
G	0	Foster Wonders	6 ft 5 in (1.96 m)	—	RS Jr	Southern Illinois	Iron Mountain, MI
G	1	Ayden Goll (W)	6 ft 2 in (1.88 m)	—	Fr	Milton High School	Milton, WI
G	2	Preston Ruedinger	6 ft 2 in (1.88 m)	—	RS Jr	Valparaiso	Oshkosh, WI
G	3	Jeremiah Johnson	6 ft 3 in (1.91 m)	—	Fr	Phoenix Prep	Phoenix, AZ
G	4	Mac Wrecke	6 ft 5 in (1.96 m)	—	RS Fr	Arrowhead High School	Hartland, WI
G	6	Ben Tweedy	6 ft 2 in (1.88 m)	—	Fr	Rockhampton Cyclones	Southport, Queensland
F	7	Donovan Santoro	6 ft 8 in (2.03 m)	—	So	Providence	Los Angeles, CA
G	8	Bennett Basich	6 ft 4 in (1.93 m)	—	Fr	Arrowhead High School	Hartland, WI
G	9	Anthony Roy	6 ft 5 in (1.96 m)	—	Sr	Langston	Oakland, CA
G	10	C.J. O'Hara	6 ft 4 in (1.93 m)	—	Fr	Combine Academy	Minneapolis, MN
G	11	Muodubem Muoneke	6 ft 5 in (1.96 m)	—	Jr	Abilene Christian	Cypress, TX
F	13	Marcus Hall	6 ft 6 in (1.98 m)	—	So	D.C. Everest High School	Schofield, WI
C	14	Isaiah Miranda	7 ft 1 in (2.16 m)	—	RS So	Oklahoma State	Castaic, CA
G	15	Ryan Wade	6 ft 2 in (1.88 m)	—	RS Sr	Central Michigan	Ann Arbor, MI
G	21	Brady Fitzgerald (W)	6 ft 4 in (1.93 m)	—	Fr	Mount Vernon High School	Fortville, IN
F	23	Caden Wilkins	6 ft 6 in (1.98 m)	—	Fr	Bettendorf High School	Bettendorf, IA
F/C	31	Roee Oselka	6 ft 10 in (2.08 m)	—	Fr	Hapoel Holon B.C.	Givatayim, Israel
F	34/40	Yonatan Levy	6 ft 9 in (2.06 m)	—	Fr	Hapoel Eilat B.C.	Hod HaSharon, Israel
C	77	Mouhamadou Cissé	6 ft 10 in (2.08 m)	—	So	Trinity Valley CC	Dakar, Senegal

Head coach

- Doug Gottlieb (Oklahoma State)

Assistant coach(es)

- Damon Archibald (Boise State)
- Aerick Sanders (San Diego State)
- Jordan McCabe (UNLV)

Legend

- (C) Team captain
- (S) Suspended
- (I) Ineligible
- (W) Walk-on
- Injured
- Current redshirt

Roster
Last update: January 25, 2025

== Schedule and results ==
Date time, TV	Rank^{#}	Opponent^{#}	Result	Record	High points	High rebounds	High assists	Site (attendance) city, state
Exhibition
October 24, 2024*; 6:00 p.m.		St. Norbert	W 102–73	—	46 – Roy	–	–	Kress Events Center; Green Bay, WI
Regular season
November 4, 2024*; 8:00 p.m., ESPN+		at Oklahoma State	L 76–89	0–1	27 – Roy	7 – Hall	6 – Ruedinger	Gallagher-Iba Arena (7,251); Stillwater, OK
November 8, 2024*; 6:00 p.m., ESPN+		St. Thomas (MN)	L 76–90	0–2	24 – Roy	4 – tied	4 – tied	Kress Events Center (2,060); Green Bay, WI
November 13, 2024*; 7:00 p.m., ESPN+		at Western Illinois	W 87–73	1–2	35 – Roy	9 – Roy	6 – Roy	Western Hall (835); Macomb, IL
November 16, 2024*; 4:00 p.m., FS2		at Providence	L 65–79	1–3	19 – Hall	9 – Johnson	4 – Tweedy	Amica Mutual Pavilion (11,927); Providence, RI
November 19, 2024*; 6:00 p.m., ESPN+		SIU Edwardsville	W 82–57	2–3	34 – Roy	6 – tied	5 – Ruedinger	Resch Center (1,772); Ashwaubenon, WI
November 22, 2024*; 7:00 p.m., ESPN+		at Evansville; Ohio State MTE	L 81–98	2–4	31 – Roy	7 – Roy	2 – tied	Ford Center (4,418); Evansville, IN
November 25, 2024*; 7:00 p.m., BTN		at Ohio State; Ohio State MTE	L 69–102	2–5	30 – Roy	5 – Wrecke	5 – Tweedy	Value City Arena (10,123); Columbus, OH
November 30, 2024*; 12:00 p.m., ESPN+		Campbell	L 66–72	2–6	20 – Roy	9 – Roy	4 – Ruedinger	Resch Center (1,920); Ashwaubenon, WI
December 4, 2024; 5:30 p.m., ESPN+		at IU Indy	L 75–84	2–7 (0–1)	34 – Roy	7 – Roy	3 – Ruedinger	The Jungle (615); Indianapolis, IN
December 7, 2024; 2:00 p.m., ESPN+/TV32		Cleveland State	L 61–83	2–8 (0–2)	10 – tied	5 – Wonders	3 – Wrecke	Resch Center (2,021); Ashwaubenon, WI
December 11, 2024; 6:00 p.m., ESPN+		Milwaukee	L 67–88	2–9 (0–3)	20 – Roy	6 – Hall	3 – Hall	Resch Center (2,135); Ashwaubenon, WI
December 14, 2024*; 5:00 p.m., ESPN+		at UC Santa Barbara	L 66–83	2–10	18 – Johnson	9 – Johnson	7 – Hall	The Thunderdome (1,026); Santa Barbara, CA
December 18, 2024*; 11:00 a.m., ESPN+/TV32		Michigan Tech	L 70–72	2–11	21 – Johnson	15 – Johnson	5 – Wade	Resch Center (5,207); Ashwaubenon, WI
December 21, 2024*; 5:00 p.m., ESPN+		at Drake	L 62–72	2–12	19 – Wrecke	5 – Oselka	2 – tied	Knapp Center (3,418); Des Moines, IA
December 29, 2024; 4:00 p.m., ESPN+		Purdue Fort Wayne	L 67–83	2–13 (0–4)	12 – Ruedinger	7 – Ruedinger	5 – tied	Resch Center (1,885); Ashwaubenon, WI
January 2, 2025; 6:00 p.m., ESPN+		at Wright State	L 51–74	2–14 (0–5)	14 – Johnson	7 – Wrecke	3 – Hall	Nutter Center (3,297); Fairborn, OH
January 4, 2025; 12:00 p.m., ESPN+		at Northern Kentucky	L 60–78	2–15 (0–6)	19 – Hall	5 – Ruedinger	6 – Ruedinger	Truist Arena (2,119); Highland Heights, KY
January 11, 2025; 3:00 p.m., ESPN+		at Milwaukee	L 59–70	2–16 (0–7)	15 – tied	8 – Levy	7 – Ruedinger	UWM Panther Arena (3,507); Milwaukee, WI
January 17, 2025; 6:00 p.m., ESPN+		Robert Morris	L 67–89	2–17 (0–8)	17 – Hall	5 – Ruedinger	4 – tied	Resch Center (2,007); Ashwaubenon, WI
January 19, 2025; 12:00 p.m., ESPN+		Youngstown State	L 69–73	2–18 (0–9)	18 – Levy	7 – Johnson	4 – tied	Resch Center (1,651); Ashwaubenon, WI
January 22, 2025; 6:00 p.m., ESPN+/TV32		IU Indy	L 77–86	2–19 (0–10)	18 – Johnson	8 – Ruedinger	4 – tied	Resch Center (1,958); Ashwaubenon, WI
January 25, 2025; 2:00 p.m., ESPN+		at Cleveland State	L 66–81	2–20 (0–11)	19 – Levy	9 – Levy	4 – Levy	Wolstein Center (1,830); Cleveland, OH
January 30, 2025; 6:00 p.m., ESPN+		at Oakland	L 54–68	2–21 (0–12)	16 – Wonders	6 – Wrecke	3 – Wade	OU Credit Union O'rena (2,071); Auburn Hills, MI
February 1, 2025; 12:00 p.m., ESPN+		at Detroit Mercy	L 57–67	2–22 (0–13)	15 – Levy	10 – Levy	3 – Levy	Calihan Hall (1,501); Detroit, MI
February 8, 2025; 6:00 p.m., ESPN+		at Purdue Fort Wayne	L 74–89	2–23 (0–14)	20 – Johnson	8 – Tweedy	5 – Levy	Memorial Coliseum (2,422); Fort Wayne, IN
February 14, 2025; 6:00 p.m., ESPN+		Northern Kentucky	L 60–73	2–24 (0–15)	19 – Hall	8 – Johnson	3 – tied	Kress Events Center (1,501); Green Bay, WI
February 16, 2025; 2:00 p.m., ESPN+/TV32		Wright State	W 79–68	3–24 (1–15)	27 – Tweedy	7 – tied	5 – Hall	Kress Events Center (1,708); Green Bay, WI
February 21, 2025; 6:00 p.m., ESPN+		at Robert Morris	L 85–94	3–25 (1–16)	29 – Hall	7 – Hall	7 – Ruedinger	UPMC Events Center (1,172); Moon Township, PA
February 23, 2025; 1:00 p.m., ESPN+		at Youngstown State	L 77–81	3–26 (1–17)	16 – Hall	8 – O'Hara	7 – Tweedy	Beeghly Center (2,135); Youngstown, OH
February 27, 2025; 6:00 p.m., ESPN+		Detroit Mercy	W 76–71	4–26 (2–17)	20 – Johnson	7 – O'Hara	4 – Tweedy	Resch Center (1,754); Ashwaubenon, WI
March 1, 2025; 6:00 p.m., ESPN+		Oakland	L 84–87	4–27 (2–18)	25 – Hall	5 – Hall	6 – Tweedy	Resch Center (2,241); Ashwaubenon, WI
Horizon League tournament
March 4, 2025; 7:00 p.m., ESPN+	(11)	at (6) Oakland; First round	L 72–96	4–28	21 – Johnson	11 – Levy	6 – tied	OU Credit Union O'rena (2,003); Auburn Hills, MI
*Non-conference game. ^{#}Rankings from AP poll. (#) Tournament seedings in parentheses. All times are in Central.
