= 2023–24 Green Bay Phoenix men's basketball team =

American college basketball season

2023–24 Green Bay Phoenix men's basketball
- Conference: Horizon League
- Record: 18–14 (13–7 Horizon)
- Head coach: Sundance Wicks (1st season)
- Assistant coaches: Pat Monaghan; Zach Malvik; Nic Reynolds
- Home arena: Resch Center; Kress Events Center

2023–24 Horizon League men's basketball standings
	Conf.				Overall
Team	W		L	PCT	W		L	PCT
Oakland †	15	–	5	.750	24	–	12	.667
Youngstown State	14	–	6	.700	22	–	10	.688
Green Bay	13	–	7	.650	18	–	14	.563
Wright State	13	–	7	.650	18	–	14	.563
Northern Kentucky	12	–	8	.600	18	–	15	.545
Milwaukee	12	–	8	.600	20	–	15	.571
Cleveland State	11	–	9	.550	21	–	15	.583
Purdue Fort Wayne	11	–	9	.550	23	–	13	.639
Robert Morris	6	–	14	.300	10	–	22	.313
IUPUI	2	–	18	.100	6	–	26	.188
Detroit Mercy	1	–	19	.050	1	–	31	.031
† 2024 Horizon League tournament winner

The 2023–24 Green Bay Phoenix men's basketball team represented the University of Wisconsin–Green Bay during the 2023–24 NCAA Division I men's basketball season. The Phoenix, led by first-year head coach Sundance Wicks, played their home games at the Resch Center in Ashwaubenon, Wisconsin, with select games held on campus at the Kress Events Center in Green Bay. They were members of the Horizon League.

The Phoenix finished the season 18–14, 13–7 in Horizon League play, to finish in a tie for third place. As the No. 3 seed in the Horizon League tournament, they lost to Milwaukee in the quarterfinals.

== Previous season ==
The Phoenix finished the 2022–23 season 3–29, 2–18 Horizon League play, to finish in 11th place. On January 31, 2023, third-year head coach Will Ryan was fired after starting the season 2–19. Assistant coach Freddie Owens was named interim head coach for the rest of the season. The Phoenix lost in the first round of the Horizon League tournament to Wright State.

== Offseason ==
=== Departures ===
Green Bay departures
Name	Number	Pos.	Height	Weight	Year	Hometown	Reason for departure
Zae Blake	5	G	6' 1"		Sophomore	Washington, D.C.	Transferred to Wagner
Brayden Dailey	22	F	6' 7"		RS Freshman	Cuba City, WI	Transferred to Concordia St. Paul
Garren Davis	0	G	6' 4"		Junior	Dallas, TX	Transferred to St. Mary's (TX)
Brock Heffner	24	F	6' 8"		RS Freshman	Grafton, WI	Transferred to Mary
Nate Jenkins	55	G	6' 2"		Junior	Delafield, WI	Left team
Cade Meyer	11	F	6' 8"		Sophomore	Monroe, WI	Transferred to Northern Kentucky
Jack Rose	21	G	6' 5"		Freshman	Bristol, WI	Transferred to Parkside
Donavan Short	13	C	6' 10"		Freshman	Denmark, WI	Transferred to Nebraska–Kearney
Randy Tucker	1	G	6' 4"		RS Junior	Rock Island, IL	Transferred to Niagara
Davin Ziegler	4	G	6' 3"		Junior	Cleveland, OH	Left team

=== Incoming transfers ===
Green Bay incoming transfers
Name	Number	Pos.	Height	Weight	Year	Hometown	Previous School
Rich Bhyre	34	F	6' 8"		RS Senior	Delafield, WI	Rockhurst
Will Earnes	23	F	6' 7"		Graduate	Lee's Summit, MO	Missouri Western
Elijah Jones	1	F	6' 7"		Junior	South Holland, IL	John A. Logan College
Noah Reynolds	21	G	6' 3"		Junior	Peoria, IL	Wyoming
Preston Ruedinger	2	G	6' 2"		Sophomore	Oshkosh, WI	Valparaiso
Foster Wonders	0	G	6' 5"		RS Sophomore	Iron Mountain, MI	Southern Illinois

=== 2023 recruiting class ===
College recruiting
Name	Hometown	School	Height	Weight	Commit date
Mac Wrecke; SF	Hartland, WI	Arrowhead	6 ft 3 in (1.91 m)	175 lb (79 kg)	Sep 5, 2022
Mac Wrecke; SF	Recruit ratings: 247Sports:				
Marcus Hall; SF	Schofield, WI	D.C. Everest	6 ft 7 in (2.01 m)	N/A	Sep 25, 2022
Marcus Hall; SF	Recruit ratings: No ratings found				
David Douglas Jr. SG	Yorkville, IL	Yorkville Christian	6 ft 5 in (1.96 m)	N/A	Mar 14, 2023
David Douglas Jr. SG	Recruit ratings: No ratings found				
Jacob Antchak; C	Langley, BC	Canada Topflight Academy West	6 ft 8 in (2.03 m)	250 lb (110 kg)	Apr 17, 2023
Jacob Antchak; C	Recruit ratings: No ratings found				
Overall recruit ranking:
Note: In many cases, Scout, Rivals, 247Sports, On3, and ESPN may conflict in their listings of height and weight.; In these cases, the average was taken. ESPN grades are on a 100-point scale.; Sources: "2023 Team Ranking". Rivals.

== Roster ==
2023–24 Green Bay Phoenix men's basketball team
Players
Coaches

Pos.	#	Name	Height	Weight	Year	Previous school	Hometown
G	0	Foster Wonders	6 ft 5 in (1.96 m)	—	RS So	Southern Illinois	Iron Mountain, MI
F	1	Elijah Jones	6 ft 7 in (2.01 m)	—	Jr	John A. Logan College	South Holland, IL
G	2	Preston Ruedinger	6 ft 2 in (1.88 m)	—	So	Valparaiso	Oshkosh, WI
F	3	Clarence III Cummings	6 ft 5 in (1.96 m)	—	RS Jr	State College of Florida	Orlando, FL
G	4	Mac Wrecke	6 ft 5 in (1.96 m)	—	Fr	Arrowhead HS	Hartland, WI
F	5	Amari Jedkins	6 ft 7 in (2.01 m)	—	RS Fr	Case HS	Racine, WI
G	10	Matt Blanton (W)	6 ft 4 in (1.93 m)	—	Fr	Chelsea HS	Chelsea, MI
F	13	Marcus Hall	6 ft 6 in (1.98 m)	—	Fr	D.C. Everest HS	Schofield, WI
G	15	David Jr. Douglas	6 ft 5 in (1.96 m)	—	Fr	Yorkville Christian HS	Yorkville, IL
G	21	Noah Reynolds	6 ft 3 in (1.91 m)	—	Jr	Wyoming	Peoria, IL
C	22	Jacob Antchak	6 ft 8 in (2.03 m)	—	Fr	Canada Topflight Academy West	Langley, BC
F	23	Will Earnes	6 ft 7 in (2.01 m)	—	GS	Missouri Western	Lee's Summit, MO
G	32	Ryan Wade	6 ft 2 in (1.88 m)	—	Sr	Central Michigan	Ann Arbor, MI
F	34	Rich Bhyre	6 ft 8 in (2.03 m)	—	RS Sr	Rockhurst	Delafield, WI
G	41	Garret Dutro (W)	6 ft 5 in (1.96 m)	—	Fr	Placer HS	Colfax, CA

Head coach

- Sundance Wicks (Northern State)

Assistant coach(es)

- Pat Monaghan (Lewis)
- Zach Malvik (Winona State)
- Nic Reynolds (Columbia (MO))

Legend

- (C) Team captain
- (S) Suspended
- (I) Ineligible
- (W) Walk-on
- Injured
- Current redshirt

Roster
Last update: September 25, 2023

== Schedule and results ==
Date time, TV	Rank^{#}	Opponent^{#}	Result	Record	High points	High rebounds	High assists	Site (attendance) city, state
Exhibition
October 30, 2023*; 6:00 p.m.		St. Norbert	W 65–63	–	–	–	–	Kress Events Center; Green Bay, WI
Regular season
November 6, 2023*; 7:00 p.m., ESPN+		at Iowa State	L 44–85	0–1	14 – Reynolds	7 – Hall	3 – 2 tied	Hilton Coliseum (13,360); Ames, IA
November 9, 2023*; 6:00 p.m., ESPN+		St. Francis (IL)	W 72–56	1–1	23 – Reynolds	8 – 2 tied	10 – Reynolds	Kress Events Center (1,379); Green Bay, WI
November 14, 2023*; 6:00 p.m., ESPN+		at Valparaiso	L 59–64	1–2	24 – Reynolds	15 – Jones	2 – Jones	Athletics–Recreation Center (1,207); Valparaiso, IN
November 20, 2023*; 8:00 p.m., ESPN+		at Montana State; Montana State MTE	W 54–53 ^{OT}	2–2	19 – Reynolds	9 – Jedkins	3 – 2 tied	Worthington Arena (2,251); Bozeman, MT
November 21, 2023*; 8:00 p.m.		vs. UC Riverside; Montana State MTE	L 68–74	2–3	19 – Reynolds	6 – Jones	8 – Reynolds	Worthington Arena (150); Bozeman, MT
November 25, 2023*; 2:00 p.m., ESPN+		St. Thomas (MN)	W 64–51	3–3	12 – Jones	6 – 2 tied	6 – Reynolds	Resch Center (1,618); Ashwaubenon, WI
November 29, 2023; 6:00 p.m., ESPN+		at Purdue Fort Wayne	L 71–75	3–4 (0–1)	16 – Reynolds	7 – Jones	8 – Reynolds	Allen County War Memorial Coliseum (1,807); Fort Wayne, IN
December 2, 2023; 6:00 p.m., ESPN+		Milwaukee	W 70–58	4–4 (1–1)	17 – Reynolds	9 – Jones	8 – Reynolds	Resch Center (2,320); Ashwaubenon, WI
December 6, 2023*; 7:00 p.m., ESPN+		at SIU Edwardsville	L 69–78	4–5	20 – Reynolds	5 – 2 tied	3 – 2 tied	Vadalabene Center (1,053); Edwardsville, IL
December 9, 2023*; 6:00 p.m., ESPN+		Western Illinois	L 59–68	4–6	14 – Reynolds	7 – Jones	3 – Reynolds	Resch Center (1,732); Ashwaubenon, WI
December 12, 2023*; 7:00 p.m., ESPN+		at UIC	W 70–68	5–6	31 – Reynolds	11 – Jones	3 – Reynolds	Credit Union 1 Arena (1,265); Chicago, IL
December 16, 2023*; 8:00 p.m., ESPN+		at No. 11 Oklahoma	L 47–81	5–7	13 – Douglas Jr.	4 – 2 tied	2 – 4 tied	Lloyd Noble Center (7,012); Norman, OK
December 21, 2023*; 6:00 p.m., ESPN+		MSOE	W 79–46	6–7	15 – Douglas Jr.	6 – Eames	4 – 2 tied	Resch Center (1,557); Ashwaubenon, WI
December 29, 2023; 12:00 p.m., ESPN+		Wright State	W 88–77	7–7 (2–1)	39 – Reynolds	6 – Wonders	6 – Reynolds	Resch Center (1,917); Ashwaubenon, WI
December 31, 2023; 12:00 p.m., ESPN+		Robert Morris	W 78–61	8–7 (3–1)	27 – Reynolds	6 – Jones	3 – Wade	Resch Center (1,650); Ashwaubenon, WI
January 4, 2024; 6:00 p.m., ESPN+		at Detroit Mercy	W 69–51	9–7 (4–1)	14 – Wonders	14 – Eames	4 – Reynolds	Calihan Hall (1,003); Detroit, MI
January 6, 2024; 2:00 p.m., ESPN+		at Oakland	L 73–79	9–8 (4–2)	15 – Douglas Jr.	8 – Eames	7 – Eames	Athletics Center O'Rena (3,143); Rochester, MI
January 10, 2024; 11:00 a.m., ESPN+		at IUPUI	W 68–58	10–8 (5–2)	26 – Douglas Jr.	10 – Jones	6 – Reynolds	Indiana Farmers Coliseum (548); Indianapolis, IN
January 14, 2024; 2:00 p.m., ESPN+		Cleveland State	W 79–71	11–8 (6–2)	32 – Reynolds	10 – Jones	5 – Reynolds	Resch Center (1,463); Ashwaubenon, WI
January 18, 2024; 6:00 p.m., ESPN+		at Wright State	W 88–81	12–8 (7–2)	30 – Reynolds	8 – Reynolds	8 – Reynolds	Nutter Center (3,590); Dayton, OH
January 20, 2024; 5:30 p.m., ESPN+		at Northern Kentucky	L 52–74	12–9 (7–3)	11 – Jones	10 – Hall	4 – Reynolds	Truist Arena (4,935); Highland Heights, KY
January 25, 2024; 6:00 p.m., ESPN+		Oakland	W 69–59	13–9 (8–3)	19 – Wonders	8 – Eames	6 – Ruedinger	Resch Center (3,513); Ashwaubenon, WI
January 27, 2024; 12:00 p.m., ESPN+		Detroit Mercy	W 78–64	14–9 (9–3)	34 – Reynolds	9 – Wonders	5 – Reynolds	Resch Center (2,625); Ashwaubenon, WI
February 1, 2024; 11:00 a.m., ESPN+		IUPUI	W 79–56	15–9 (10–3)	20 – Douglas Jr.	5 – 2 tied	4 – 3 tied	Resch Center (5,490); Ashwaubenon, WI
February 8, 2024; 6:00 p.m., ESPN+		at Robert Morris	W 81–76 ^{OT}	16–9 (11–3)	32 – Reynolds	8 – Jones	2 – Ruedinger	UPMC Events Center (826); Moon Township, PA
February 10, 2024; 12:30 p.m., ESPN+		at Youngstown State	W 84–83	17–9 (12–3)	26 – Ruedinger	8 – Douglas	4 – 2 tied	Beeghly Center (3,229); Youngstown, OH
February 14, 2024; 6:00 p.m., ESPN+		Northern Kentucky	L 57–58	17–10 (12–4)	18 – Reynolds	14 – Jones	4 – Reynolds	Resch Center (2,425); Ashwaubenon, WI
February 23, 2024; 6:00 p.m., ESPN+		Purdue Fort Wayne	L 59–85	17–11 (12–5)	19 – Eames	7 – 2 tied	3 – 2 tied	Kress Events Center (3,301); Green Bay, WI
February 25, 2024; 2:00 p.m., ESPN+		Youngstown State	L 59–71	17–12 (12–6)	12 – 2 tied	5 – 2 tied	5 – 2 tied	Kress Events Center (3,202); Green Bay, WI
February 28, 2024; 6:00 p.m., ESPN+		at Cleveland State	W 69–61	18–12 (13–6)	12 – Hall	15 – Jones	4 – Ruedinger	Wolstein Center (1,752); Cleveland, OH
March 2, 2024; 7:00 p.m., ESPNU		at Milwaukee	L 69–90	18–13 (13–7)	15 – 2 tied	7 – Jones	5 – Byhre	UW-Milwaukee Panther Arena (4,037); Milwaukee, WI
Horizon League tournament
March 7, 2024; 9:00 p.m., ESPN+	(3)	(6) Milwaukee; Quarterfinals	L 84–95	18–14	27 – Reynolds	6 – 3 tied	6 – Reynolds	Kress Events Center (2,394); Green Bay, WI
*Non-conference game. ^{#}Rankings from AP poll. (#) Tournament seedings in parentheses. All times are in Central.
