= The Doug Gottlieb Show =

- Current logo
- Genre: Sports Talk
- Running time: 1 hour
- Country of origin: United States
- Home station: WFRV-TV (2026–present); Fox Sports Radio (2017–2025); CBS Sports Radio (2013–2017); ESPN Radio (2006–2012)
- Starring: Doug Gottlieb
- Original release: November 13, 2006 – July 30, 2012 (first run); January 2, 2013 – April 14, 2017 (second run); April 24, 2017 – December 19, 2025 (third run); January 17, 2026 – present (fourth run)

The Doug Gottlieb Show is a weekly produced TV show with broadcasting on WFRV-TV in Green Bay, Wisconsin and distributed on the iHeart podcast network. Since the show's debut on November 13, 2006, the show has been hosted by Doug Gottlieb, former basketball standout and the head coach of the Green Bay Phoenix men's basketball team.

== History ==
Before becoming a weekly produced TV show in 2026, The Doug Gottlieb Show was a live and syndicated radio show that aired weekdays on ESPN Radio from 2006 to 2012, CBS Sports Radio from 2013 to 2017, and on Fox Sports Radio from 2017 to 2025.

=== ESPN Radio ===
Since joining ESPN Radio in September 2003, Gottlieb had co-hosted GameNight along with personalities such as Chuck Wilson, Jeff Rickard, John Seibel and Freddie Coleman. Due to Gottlieb's extensive work for ESPN's college basketball coverage, the primary fill-in host for the program during the evening was Andy Gresh but since Gresh's departure from ESPN Radio, Jason Smith was the regular substitute for Gottlieb.

The debuting of The Doug Gottlieb Show in 2006 caused a major shake up in the ESPN Radio lineup, as SportsNation on ESPN Radio was dropped completely from the airwaves and The Brian Kenny Show was created to take up the later slot, from 8 pm-10 pm.

Show logo at ESPN Radio

Jon Stashower was the SportsCenter anchor for the show in the 8 pm-11 pm slot until 2008, when he was moved to the afternoon spot allowing anchors Marc Kestecher and Neil Jackson to split the time between 8 pm–11 pm. He rejoined the show on February 2, 2009 when it was moved to its earlier slot.

=== CBS Sports Radio ===
On July 31, 2012 it was announced that Gottlieb had signed with CBS and would no longer be appearing on ESPN. His last show on ESPN was July 30, and his first with CBS was January 2, 2013. While at CBS, the show was simulcasted on both CBS Sports Radio and CBS Sports Network. His last show at CBS Sports Radio was on April 14, 2017.

=== Fox Sports Radio ===
Announced on March 22, 2017, Gottlieb signed a deal with Fox Sports Radio and Fox Sports 1, starting on April 24, 2017. The show replaced Jay Mohr Sports on the radio's 3pm-6 pm ET timeslot.

On December 19, 2025, the show aired its final live radio broadcast, two days after Gottlieb announced he would step away from daily radio.

== Segments ==
- Game Time: Doug Gottlieb Show sports news update correspondent Dan Beyer gives Gottlieb a different game to play each day of the week. Games include: "Psychic", "The Draft", "Rank'em", along with others.
- What Does the Fox Say?: Since joining Fox Sports, Gottlieb gives his take on what his Fox Sports colleagues had to say on certain topics.
- The Press: Gottlieb ends the show by giving his take on current sports news.
