= 2023–24 Milwaukee Panthers men's basketball team =

American college basketball season

2023–24 Milwaukee Panthers men's basketball
- Conference: Horizon League
- Record: 20–15 (12–8 Horizon)
- Head coach: Bart Lundy (2nd season)
- Assistant coaches: Jake Williams; Ben Walker; Jose Winston
- Home arena: UW–Milwaukee Panther Arena; Klotsche Center

2023–24 Horizon League men's basketball standings
	Conf.				Overall
Team	W		L	PCT	W		L	PCT
Oakland †	15	–	5	.750	24	–	12	.667
Youngstown State	14	–	6	.700	22	–	10	.688
Green Bay	13	–	7	.650	18	–	14	.563
Wright State	13	–	7	.650	18	–	14	.563
Northern Kentucky	12	–	8	.600	18	–	15	.545
Milwaukee	12	–	8	.600	20	–	15	.571
Cleveland State	11	–	9	.550	21	–	15	.583
Purdue Fort Wayne	11	–	9	.550	23	–	13	.639
Robert Morris	6	–	14	.300	10	–	22	.313
IUPUI	2	–	18	.100	6	–	26	.188
Detroit Mercy	1	–	19	.050	1	–	31	.031
† 2024 Horizon League tournament winner

The 2023–24 Milwaukee Panthers men's basketball team represented the University of Wisconsin–Milwaukee during the 2023–24 NCAA Division I men's basketball season. The Panthers, led by second-year head coach Bart Lundy, played their home games at the UW–Milwaukee Panther Arena in Milwaukee, Wisconsin and select games at the on-campus Klotsche Center as members of the Horizon League.

== Previous season ==
The Panthers finished the 2022–23 season in second place in the Horizon League with a record of 22–12, including 14–6 in conference play. They received a first-round bye in the Horizon League tournament, defeating seventh-seeded Wright State in the quarterfinals at the Klotsche Center before losing to third-seeded Cleveland State in Indianapolis in the semifinals. The Panthers were invited to the 2023 College Basketball Invitational as the eleventh-seeded team. They upset sixth-seeded Stetson in overtime in the first round before losing to eventual champions Charlotte in the quarterfinals.

== Offseason ==
=== Departures ===
Milwaukee departures
Name	Number	Pos.	Height	Weight	Year	Hometown	Reason for departure
Keon Edwards	35	G	6'8"	210	Sophomore	Houston, TX	Transferred to Northeastern State
Jalen Johnson	24	F	6'7"	230	RS Junior	Indianapolis, IN	Transferred to Grambling State
Vincent Miszkiewicz	20	F	6'7"	220	Sophomore	Elgin, IL	Transferred to Keiser
Justin Thomas	25	G	6'7"	179	Sophomore	Baton Rouge, LA	Dismissed from team Transferred to UTSA
Brian Taylor II	0	G	6'4"	184	Freshman	St. Louis, MO	Transferred to SIU Edwardsville
Jordan Ratliffe	4	G	5'10"	189	RS Sr	Gibson, NC	Graduated
Vin Baker Jr.	11	G/F	6'9"	190	RS Sr	Old Saybrook, CT	Graduated; Played for the Milwaukee Bucks' 2023 NBA Summer League team
Ahmad Rand	23	F	6'8"	195	RS Sr	Lincolnton, GA	Graduated
Moses Bol	33	C	7'1"	225	RS Sr	Wau, South Sudan	Graduated

=== Incoming transfers ===
Milwaukee incoming transfers
Name	Number	Pos.	Height	Weight	Year	Hometown	Previous school
Learic Davis	11	G	6'7"	190	RS Freshman	Milwaukee, WI	Tennessee State
Darius Duffy	34	F	6'8"	225	Junior	Murray, KY	Ranger College
Faizon Fields	22	F	6'10"	220	Junior	Memphis, TN	Old Dominion
Aaron Franklin	25	G	6'5"	210	RS Sophomore	Raytown, MO	Hutchinson CC
Erik Pratt	8	G	6'5"	185	RS Junior	Lake Worth, FL	Texas A&M
Pierce Spencer	0	G	6'3"	175	RS Junior	Montgomery, TX	Nicholls
Langston Wilson	13	F	6'9"	215	Graduate	Upper Darby, PA	Washington

=== 2023 recruiting class ===
College recruiting information (2023)
Name	Hometown	School	Height	Weight	Commit date
Maurice Thomas; G	Chicago, IL	DePaul College Prep	6 ft 0 in (1.83 m)	175 lb (79 kg)	Jun 12, 2023
Maurice Thomas; G	Recruit ratings: No ratings found				
Overall recruit ranking:
Note: In many cases, Scout, Rivals, 247Sports, On3, and ESPN may conflict in their listings of height and weight.; In these cases, the average was taken. ESPN grades are on a 100-point scale.; Sources: "2023 Team Ranking". Rivals.

== Preseason ==
The Panthers were picked to finish in second place in the Horizon League preseason coaches poll, only behind Northern Kentucky, receiving a total of 397 points and 10 first-place votes. Guard BJ Freeman was selected to the Preseason First-Team All-Horizon League.

== Roster ==
2023–24 Milwaukee Panthers men's basketball team
Players
Coaches

Pos.	#	Name	Height	Weight	Year	Previous school	Hometown
G	0	Pierce Spencer	6 ft 3 in (1.91 m)	175 lb (79 kg)	RS Jr	Nicholls	Porter, TX
G	2	Elijah Jamison	6 ft 3 in (1.91 m)	196 lb (89 kg)	So	Liberty Heights HS	Louisburg, NC
G	3	Zach Howell	6 ft 5 in (1.96 m)	200 lb (91 kg)	So	Springfield Catholic	Springfield, MO
F	4	Kentrell Pullian	6 ft 0 in (1.83 m)	180 lb (82 kg)	Jr	Eastern New Mexico	Benton Harbor, MI
G	5	Angelo Stuart	6 ft 1 in (1.85 m)	175 lb (79 kg)	RS Sr	Hutchinson CC	Queens, NY
G	8	Erik Pratt	6 ft 5 in (1.96 m)	185 lb (84 kg)	RS Jr	Texas A&M	Lake Worth, FL
G/F	10	BJ Freeman	6 ft 6 in (1.98 m)	200 lb (91 kg)	Jr	Dodge City CC	Selma, NC
G	11	Learic Davis	6 ft 7 in (2.01 m)	190 lb (86 kg)	RS Fr	Tennessee State	Milwaukee, WI
G	13	Langston Wilson	6 ft 9 in (2.06 m)	215 lb (98 kg)	GS	Washington	Upper Darby Township, PA
F	15	Simeon Murchison (W)	6 ft 9 in (2.06 m)	221 lb (100 kg)	Fr	Milwaukee Hamilton HS	Milwaukee, WI
G	17	Makuei Riek (W)	6 ft 6 in (1.98 m)	170 lb (77 kg)	Fr	Mayo HS	Rochester, MN
G	20	Maurice Thomas	6 ft 0 in (1.83 m)	175 lb (79 kg)	Fr	DePaul College Prep	Chicago, IL
F	21	Vinko Polovic (W)	6 ft 7 in (2.01 m)	205 lb (93 kg)	RS Fr	Bosco Institute	Milwaukee, WI
F	22	Faizon Fields	6 ft 10 in (2.08 m)	220 lb (100 kg)	Jr	Old Dominion	Memphis, TN
G	25	Aaron Franklin	6 ft 5 in (1.96 m)	210 lb (95 kg)	RS So	Hutchinson CC	Kansas City, MO
G	27	Dominic Ham (W)	6 ft 5 in (1.96 m)	195 lb (88 kg)	Sr	Georgia Highlands	Atlanta, GA
F	34	Darius Duffy	6 ft 8 in (2.03 m)	225 lb (102 kg)	Jr	Ranger	Murray, KY

Head coach

- Bart Lundy (Lenoir–Rhyne)

Assistant coach(es)

- Jake Williams (Middle Tennessee)
- Ben Walker (Creighton)
- Jose Winston (Milwaukee)

Legend

- (C) Team captain
- (S) Suspended
- (I) Ineligible
- (W) Walk-on
- Injured
- Current redshirt

Roster
Last update: September 18, 2024

=== Mid-season changes ===
On December 18, 2023, the team dismissed junior guard Markeith Browning II, who appeared in 54 games for the Panthers, including all 11 this season.

== Schedule and results ==
Date time, TV	Rank^{#}	Opponent^{#}	Result	Record	High points	High rebounds	High assists	Site (attendance) city, state
Regular season
November 6, 2023*; 7:00 p.m., ESPN+		UW-Stout	W 91–73	1–0	18 – Stuart	12 – Pullian	7 – Browning	Klotsche Center (1,297); Milwaukee, WI
November 11, 2023*; 5:00 p.m., FS2		at Providence	L 69–79	1–1	31 – Freeman	10 – Freeman	3 – Pullian	Amica Mutual Pavilion (12,090); Providence, RI
November 14, 2023*; 8:00 p.m., P12N		at No. 25 Colorado; Sunshine Slam campus-site game	L 79–106	1–2	15 – Howell	6 – Pullian	5 – Freeman	CU Events Center (6,181); Boulder, CO
November 17, 2023*; 7:00 p.m., ESPN+		Luther	W 85–56	2–2	23 – Freeman	6 – tied	5 – Pullian	UW-Milwaukee Panther Arena (2,373); Milwaukee, WI
November 20, 2023*; 12:30 p.m., FloSports		vs. Stetson; Sunshine Slam Ocean Bracket semifinals	L 67–85	2–3	20 – Freeman	5 – tied	3 – Freeman	Ocean Center; Daytona Beach, FL
November 21, 2023*; 7:30 p.m., FloSports		vs. Siena; Sunshine Slam Ocean Bracket consolation game	W 61–59	3–3	18 – Freeman	7 – Fields	4 – Freeman	Ocean Center (1,502); Daytona Beach, FL
November 25, 2023*; 1:30 p.m., ESPN+		Southern Miss	L 86–90	3–4	21 – Pullian	9 – Fields	6 – Browning II	Klotsche Center (1,605); Milwaukee, WI
December 2, 2023; 6:00 p.m., ESPN+		at Green Bay	L 58–70	3–5 (0–1)	25 – Browning II	11 – Franklin	1 – tied	Resch Center (2,320); Ashwaubenon, WI
December 6, 2023*; 7:00 p.m., SLN		at St. Thomas	L 71–75	3–6 (0–1)	17 – Pratt	6 – Pullian	6 – Pullian	Schoenecker Arena (1,316); St. Paul, MN
December 9, 2023*; 4:00 p.m.		at UC Davis	W 81–79	4–6 (0–1)	18 – Pratt	6 – Franklin	4 – Pratt	University Credit Union Center (1,143); Davis, CA
December 13, 2023*; 7:00 p.m., ESPN+		Longwood	L 67–80	4–7	12 – Pratt	6 – Franklin	2 – tied	UW-Milwaukee Panther Arena (1,551); Milwaukee, WI
December 22, 2023*; 1:00 p.m., ESPN+		Chattanooga	W 85–83 ^{OT}	5–7	29 – Pratt	10 – Duffy	8 – Jamison	UW-Milwaukee Panther Arena (1,501); Milwaukee, WI
December 29, 2023; 7:00 p.m., ESPN+		Robert Morris	W 78–75	6–7 (1–1)	28 – Pullian	9 – Duffy	3 – Pratt	UW-Milwaukee Panther Arena (1,722); Milwaukee, WI
December 31, 2023; 2:00 p.m., ESPN+		Wright State	W 91–83	7–7 (2–1)	23 – Freeman	6 – tied	6 – Freeman	UW-Milwaukee Panther Arena (1,794); Milwaukee, WI
January 4, 2024; 6:00 p.m., ESPN+		at Oakland	L 95–100	7–8 (2–2)	21 – Pullian	12 – Fields	7 – Jamison	Athletics Center O'rena (2,248); Rochester, MI
January 6, 2024; 12:00 p.m., ESPN+		at Detroit Mercy	W 84–61	8–8 (3–2)	20 – Pratt	9 – Freeman	4 – Freeman	Calihan Hall (889); Detroit, MI
January 12, 2024; 2:00 p.m., ESPN+		Cleveland State	W 88–80	9–8 (4–2)	21 – Pratt	14 – Wilson	5 – Freeman	UW-Milwaukee Panther Arena (1,431); Milwaukee, WI
January 18, 2024; 6:00 p.m., ESPN+		at Northern Kentucky	L 72–90	9–9 (4–3)	22 – Jamison	7 – Pullian	7 – Freeman	Truist Arena (3,405); Highland Heights, KY
January 20, 2024; 6:00 p.m., ESPN+		at Wright State	L 81–95	9–10 (4–4)	17 – Freeman	9 – Pratt	3 – tied	Nutter Center (5,398); Dayton, OH
January 25, 2024; 7:00 p.m., ESPN+		Detroit Mercy	W 87–71	10–10 (5–4)	22 – Freeman	11 – Freeman	5 – Freeman	UW-Milwaukee Panther Arena (2,341); Milwaukee, WI
January 27, 2024; 3:00 p.m., ESPN+		Oakland	L 87–91 ^{2OT}	10–11 (5–5)	27 – Pullian	16 – Fields	9 – Freeman	UW-Milwaukee Panther Arena (2,729); Milwaukee, WI
February 1, 2024; 6:00 p.m., ESPN+		at Purdue Fort Wayne	W 68–65	11–11 (6–5)	26 – Freeman	12 – Fields	4 – Freeman	Hilliard Gates Sports Center (903); Fort Wayne, IN
February 4, 2024; 2:00 p.m., ESPN+		IUPUI	W 87–67	12–11 (7–5)	16 – tied	12 – Fields	6 – Freeman	Klotsche Center (1,616); Milwaukee, WI
February 8, 2024; 5:30 p.m., ESPN+		at Youngstown State	L 85–97 ^{OT}	12–12 (7–6)	24 – Freeman	16 – Fields	5 – tied	Beeghly Center (3,046); Youngstown, OH
February 10, 2024; 1:00 p.m., ESPN+		at Robert Morris	L 60–71	12–13 (7–7)	23 – Freeman	7 – tied	2 – tied	UPMC Events Center (1,084); Moon Township, PA
February 14, 2024; 6:00 p.m., ESPN+		at Cleveland State	W 71–68	13–13 (8–7)	17 – Fields	12 – Pullian	3 – tied	Wolstein Center (1,281); Cleveland, OH
February 17, 2024; 7:00 p.m., ESPN+		Northern Kentucky	W 73–72	14–13 (9–7)	26 – Freeman	11 – tied	5 – Freeman	UW-Milwaukee Panther Arena (2,509); Milwaukee, WI
February 23, 2024; 7:00 p.m., ESPN+		Youngstown State	L 80–84 ^{OT}	14–14 (9–8)	22 – Freeman	10 – Fields	8 – Freeman	UW-Milwaukee Panther Arena (2,296); Milwaukee, WI
February 25, 2024; 2:00 p.m., ESPN+		Purdue Fort Wayne	W 96–88	15–14 (10–8)	38 – Freeman	6 – tied	4 – tied	UW-Milwaukee Panther Arena (2,194); Milwaukee, WI
February 28, 2024; 6:00 p.m., ESPN+		at IUPUI	W 75–70	16–14 (11–8)	22 – Freeman	10 – Freeman	2 – tied	Indiana Farmers Coliseum (1,180); Indianapolis, IN
March 2, 2024; 7:00 p.m., ESPNU		Green Bay	W 90–69	17–14 (12–8)	22 – Freeman	11 – Freeman	6 – Freeman	UW-Milwaukee Panther Arena (4,037); Milwaukee, WI
Horizon League tournament
March 5, 2024; 7:00 p.m., ESPN+	(6)	(11) Detroit Mercy; First round	W 83–79	18–14	30 – Freeman	10 – Freeman	5 – tied	Klotsche Center (1,558); Milwaukee, WI
March 7, 2024; 9:00 p.m., ESPN+	(6)	at (3) Green Bay; Quarterfinals	W 95–84	19–14	32 – Freeman	10 – Freeman	5 – Freeman	Kress Events Center (2,394); Green Bay, WI
March 11, 2024; 8:30 p.m., ESPN2	(6)	vs. (5) Northern Kentucky; Semifinals	W 82–75	20–14	27 – Freeman	16 – Fields	4 – Jamison	Indiana Farmers Coliseum; Indianapolis, IN
March 12, 2024; 6:00 p.m., ESPN	(6)	vs. (1) Oakland; Championship	L 76–83	20–15	16 – Pratt	9 – Franklin	6 – Jamison	Indiana Farmers Coliseum; Indianapolis, IN
*Non-conference game. ^{#}Rankings from AP poll. (#) Tournament seedings in parentheses. All times are in Central.
