= Green Bay Phoenix men's basketball =

Men's basketball team of UW-Green Bay

2026–27 Green Bay Phoenix men's basketball team
- University: University of Wisconsin–Green Bay
- Head coach: Doug Gottlieb (3rd season)
- Location: Green Bay, Wisconsin
- Arena: Resch Center (9,729); Kress Events Center (4,018)
- Conference: Horizon League
- Nickname: Phoenix
- Colors: Green and white

NCAA Division I tournament runner-up
- 1978*, 1979*
Other NCAA Division I tournament results
Final Four	1978*, 1979*, 1981*
Elite Eight	1978*, 1979*, 1981*
Sweet Sixteen	1976*, 1977*, 1978*, 1979*, 1981*
Appearances	NCAA Division I 1991, 1994, 1995, 1996, 2016; NCAA Division II; 1974, 1976, 1977, 1978, 1979, 1981

Conference tournament champions
- 1991, 1994 (Summit); 1995, 2016 (Horizon)

Conference regular-season champions
- 1992, 1994 (Summit); 1996, 2014 (Horizon)

Uniforms
Home	Away
- * NCAA Division II

The Green Bay Phoenix men's basketball team is an NCAA Division I college basketball team competing in the Horizon League for the University of Wisconsin–Green Bay. They are coached by Doug Gottlieb. The Phoenix have appeared five times in the NCAA tournament, most recently in 2016.

== History ==
The Green Bay men's basketball team began play in the 1969–70 school year where it competed at the NAIA level before moving to NCAA Division II in 1973. In 1982, it moved to NCAA Division I, where it competed in the Association of Mid-Continent Universities (now the Summit League). Since 1994, Green Bay has competed in the Horizon League (formerly the Midwestern Collegiate Conference). The Phoenix saw success in the early-to-mid-1990s, making their first NCAA tournament appearance in 1991 and their first second-round appearance in 1994. The team made another first-round appearance in 2016.

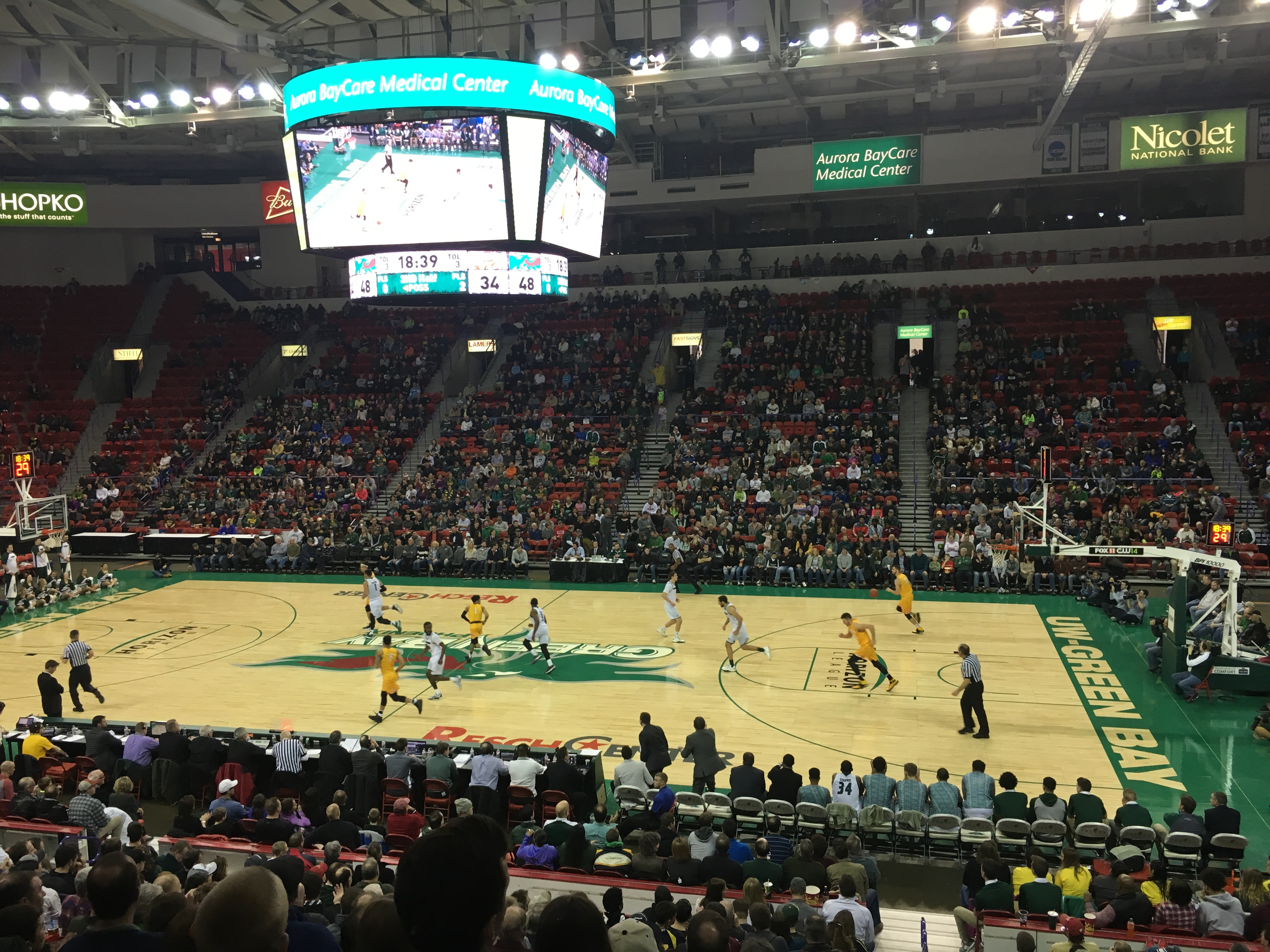
The team has played the majority of its home games at the Resch Center since the facility opened in 2002. Starting in 2021 the team began splitting more games with the Kress Events Center located on campus at the University of Wisconsin–Green Bay

== Division I seasons ==
Season	Coach	Overall	Conference	Standing	Postseason
1981–82	Dave Buss	14–13	Independent	-	-
1982–83	Dick Lien	9–19	Mid-Continent Conference	8th	-
1983–84	Dick Lien	9–19	Mid-Continent Conference	6th	-
1984–85	Dick Lien	4–24	Mid-Continent Conference	8th	-
1985–86	Dick Bennett	5–23	Mid-Continent Conference	7th	-
1986–87	Dick Bennett	15–14	Mid-Continent Conference	4th	-
1987–88	Dick Bennett	18–9	Mid-Continent Conference	3rd	-
1988–89	Dick Bennett	14–14	Mid-Continent Conference	4th	-
1989–90	Dick Bennett	24–8	Mid-Continent Conference	2nd	NIT second round
1990–91	Dick Bennett	24–7	Mid-Continent Conference	2nd	Mid-Con Tournament Champs; NCAA first round
1991–92	Dick Bennett	25–5	Mid-Continent Conference	1st	Mid-Con Regular Season Champs; NIT first round
1992–93	Dick Bennett	13–14	Mid-Continent Conference	4th	-
1993–94	Dick Bennett	27–7	Mid-Continent Conference	1st	Mid-Con Regular Season Champs; Mid-Con Tournament Champs; NCAA second round
1994–95	Dick Bennett	22–8	Midwestern City Conference	2nd	MCC Tournament Champs; NCAA first round
1995–96	Mike Heideman	25–4	Midwestern City Conference	1st	MCC Regular Season Champs; NCAA first round
1996–97	Mike Heideman	14–14	Midwestern City Conference	4th	-
1997–98	Mike Heideman	17–12	Midwestern City Conference	4th	-
1998–99	Mike Heideman	20–11	Midwestern City Conference	3rd	-
1999–00	Mike Heideman	14–16	Midwestern City Conference	4th	-
2000–01	Mike Heideman	11–17	Midwestern City Conference	7th	-
2001–02	Mike Heideman	9–21	Horizon League	8th	-
2002–03	Tod Kowalczyk	10–20	Horizon League	6th	-
2003–04	Tod Kowalczyk	17–11	Horizon League	3rd	-
2004–05	Tod Kowalczyk	17–11	Horizon League	2nd	-
2005–06	Tod Kowalczyk	15–16	Horizon League	3rd	-
2006–07	Tod Kowalczyk	18–15	Horizon League	3rd	-
2007–08	Tod Kowalczyk	15–15	Horizon League	4th	-
2008–09	Tod Kowalczyk	22–11	Horizon League	2nd	CBI first round
2009–10	Tod Kowalczyk	22–13	Horizon League	3rd	CBI second round
2010–11	Brian Wardle	14–18	Horizon League	7th	-
2011–12	Brian Wardle	15–15	Horizon League	6th	-
2012–13	Brian Wardle	18–16	Horizon League	3rd	CIT first round
2013–14	Brian Wardle	24–7	Horizon League	1st	Horizon Regular Season Champs; NIT first round
2014–15	Brian Wardle	24–9	Horizon League	2nd	NIT first round
2015–16	Linc Darner	23–12	Horizon League	4th	Horizon Tournament Champs; NCAA first round
2016–17	Linc Darner	18–14	Horizon League	3rd	CBI first round
2017–18	Linc Darner	13–20	Horizon League	7th	-
2018–19	Linc Darner	21–17	Horizon League	4th	CIT Runner-Up
2019–20	Linc Darner	17–16	Horizon League	3rd	-
2020–21	Will Ryan	8–17	Horizon League	8th	-
2021–22	Will Ryan	5–25	Horizon League	11th	-
2022–23	Will Ryan; Freddie Owens (interim)	3–29	Horizon League	11th	-
2023–24	Sundance Wicks	18–14	Horizon League	3rd	-
2024–25	Doug Gottlieb	4–28	Horizon League	11th	-
2025–26	Doug Gottlieb	18-15	Horizon League	T-3rd	-

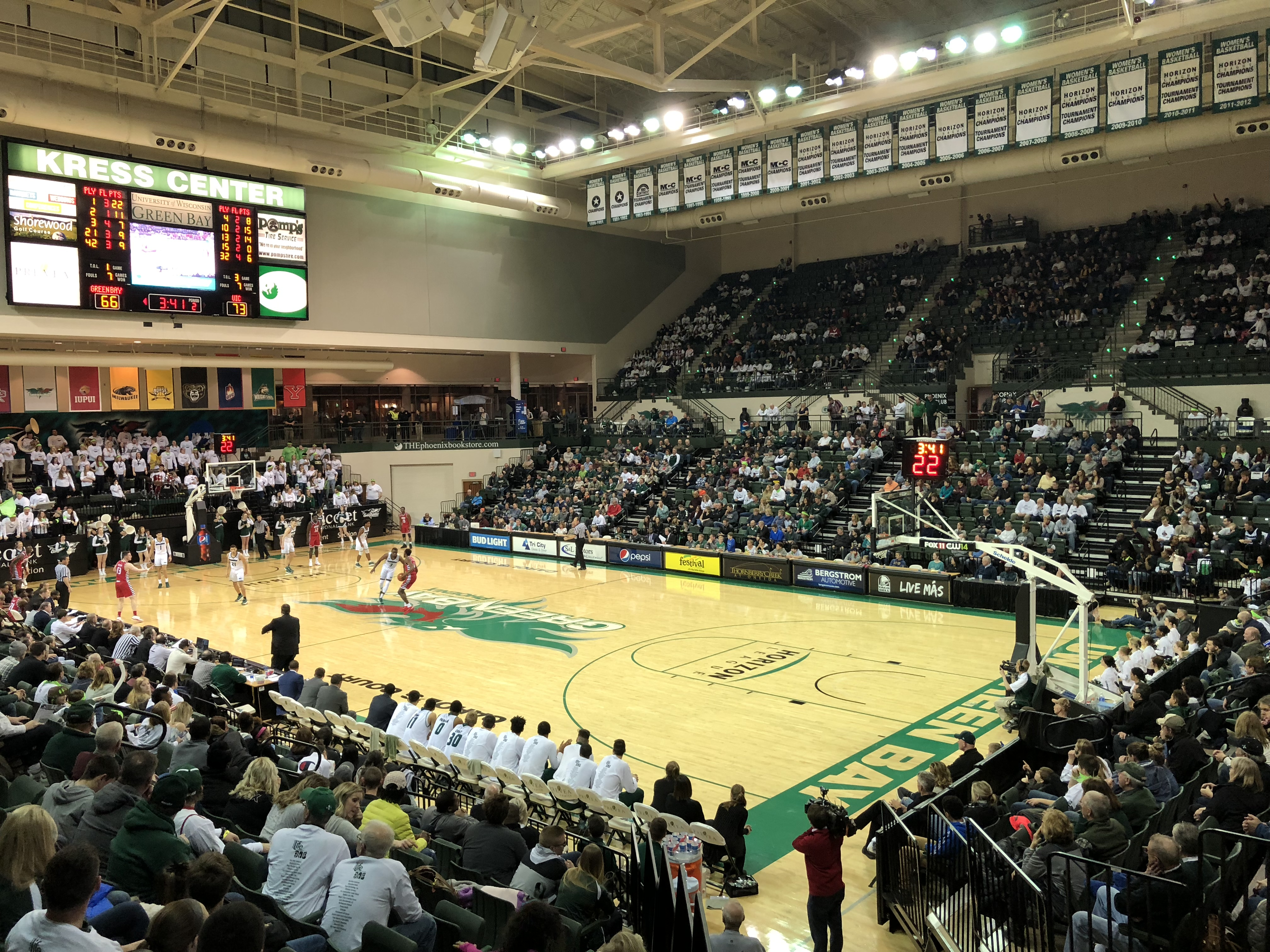
The Kress Events Center on the school's campus has hosted multiple regular season UW-Green Bay men's basketball games since February 2018.

== Postseason ==
=== NCAA Division I tournament results ===
The Phoenix have appeared in the NCAA Division I Tournament five times. Their combined record is 1–5. Their highest seed was #8 in 1996.

Year	Seed	Round	Opponent	Result
1991	#12	First round	#5 Michigan State	L 58–60
1994	#12	First round Second Round	#5 California #4 Syracuse	W 61–57; L 59–64
1995	#14	First round	#3 Purdue	L 48–49
1996	#8	First round	#9 Virginia Tech	L 49–61
2016	#14	First round	#3 Texas A&M	L 65–92

=== NCAA Division II tournament results ===
The Phoenix have appeared in the NCAA Division II Tournament six times. Their combined record is 13–8.

Year	Round	Opponent	Result
1974	Regional semifinals Regional 3rd-place game	St. Joseph's (IL); Evansville	L 54–70; L 75–87
1976	Regional semifinals Regional Finals	Minnesota State–Mankato; North Dakota	W 72–67 ^{2OT} L 61–65
1977	Regional semifinals Regional Finals	Nebraska–Omaha; North Dakota	W 89–63; L 43–45
1978	Regional semifinals Regional Finals; Elite Eight; Final Four; National Championship Game	South Dakota State; Augustana; Lincoln (MO); Eastern Illinois; Cheyney	W 80–57; W 72–60; W 63–61; W 58–43; L 40–47
1979	Regional semifinals Regional Finals; Elite Eight; Final Four; National Championship Game	North Dakota; Northern Iowa; Puget Sound; Cheyney; North Alabama	W 63–48; W 56–50; W 65–53; W 46–45; L 50–64
1981	Regional semifinals Regional Finals; Elite Eight; Final Four; National 3rd-place game	North Dakota State; North Dakota; North Alabama; Mount St. Mary's; Cal Poly	W 82–76; W 72–60; W 65–39; L 60–76; L 61–62 ^{2OT}

=== NAIA tournament results ===
The Phoenix have appeared in the NAIA Tournament one time. Their record is 2–1.

Year	Round	Opponent	Result
1973	First round Second Round; Quarterfinals	Dallas Baptist; South Carolina State; Slippery Rock	W 77–66; W 72–55; L 58–60

=== NIT results ===
The Phoenix have appeared in the National Invitation Tournament (NIT) four times. Their combined record is 1–4.

Year	Round	Opponent	Result
1990	First round Second Round	Southern Illinois; Saint Louis	W 73–60; L 54–58
1992	First round	Manhattan	L 65–67
2014	First round	Belmont	L 65–80
2015	First round	Illinois State	L 56–69

=== CBI results ===
The Phoenix have appeared in the College Basketball Invitational (CBI) three times. Their combined record is 1–3.

Year	Round	Opponent	Result
2009	First round	Vermont	L 72–76
2010	First round Quarterfinals	Akron; Saint Louis	W 70–67; L 62–68 ^{2OT}
2017	First round	UMKC	L 82–92

=== CIT results ===
The Phoenix have appeared in the CollegeInsider.com Postseason Tournament (CIT) two times. Their combined record is 4–2.

Year	Round	Opponent	Result
2013	First round	Bradley	L 69–75
2019	First round Second Round; Quarterfinals; Semifinals; Championship	East Tennessee State; FIU; Cal State Bakersfield; Texas Southern; Marshall	W 102–94; W 98–68; W 80–64; W 87–86; L 70–90

== Horizon League awards ==
=== Player of the Year ===
- Jeff Nordgaard (1996)
- Keifer Sykes (2014, 2015)

=== Newcomer of the Year ===
- Noah Reynolds (2024)

=== Defensive Player of the Year ===
- Terry Evans (2008)
- Alec Brown (2014)

=== Sixth Man of the Year ===
- Ryan Tillema (2009)
- Warren Jones (2017)

=== Freshman of the Year ===
- Amari Davis (2020)
- David Douglas Jr. (2024)

=== Coach of the Year ===
- Mike Heideman (1996)
- Brian Wardle (2014)
- Sundance Wicks (2024)

=== All-League First Team ===
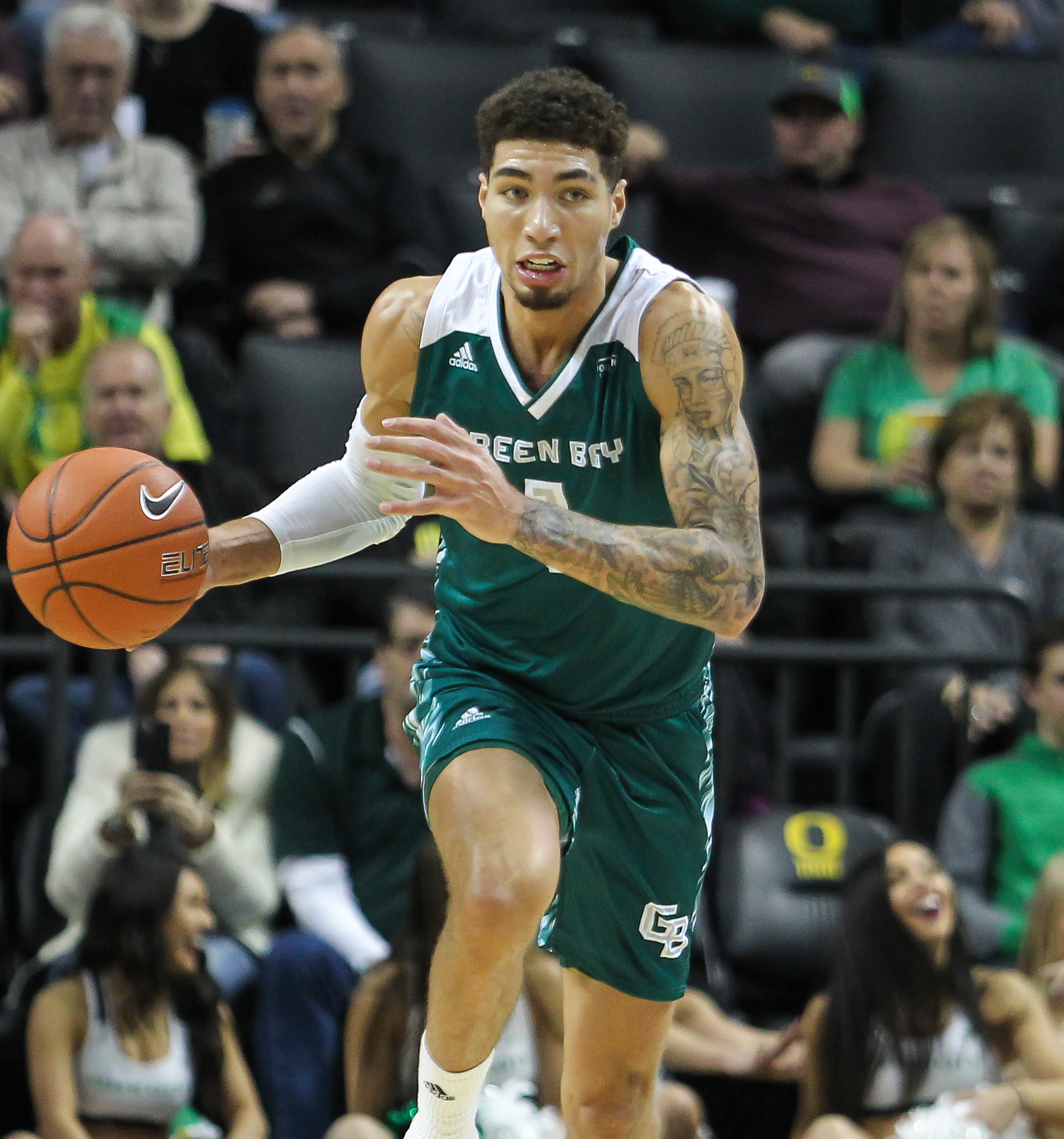
Sandy Cohen

- Jeff Nordgaard (1995, 1996)
- Ben Berlowski (1996)
- Javier Mendiburu (2005)
- Ryan Tillema (2009)
- Rahmon Fletcher (2010)
- Alec Brown (2012, 2014)
- Keifer Sykes (2013, 2014, 2015)
- Carrington Love (2016)
- Khalil Small (2018)
- Sandy Cohen III (2019)
- JayQuan McCloud (2020)
- Noah Reynolds (2024)

Additional source:

=== All-League Second Team ===
- Wayne Walker (1998)
- B.J. LaRue (1999, 2000)
- Jerry Carstensen (2000)
- Brandon Morris (2004)
- Benito Flores (2005)
- Ryan Evanochko (2006, 2007)
- Mike Schachtner (2007, 2008)
- Rahmon Fletcher (2009, 2011)
- Alec Brown (2013)
- Greg Mays (2015)
- Jordan Fouse (2016)
- Charles Cooper (2017)
- Amari Davis (2021)
- Preston Ruedinger (2026)

Additional source:

=== All-League Third Team ===
- Amari Davis (2020)
- C.J. O'Hara (2026)

=== All-Freshman Team/All-Newcomer Team ===
- Mike King (2000)
- Chris Sager (2001)
- Brandon Morris (2004)
- Benito Flores (2005)
- Mike Schachtner (2006)
- Rahmon Fletcher (2008)
- Alec Brown (2011)
- Keifer Sykes (2012)
- Jordan Fouse (2013)
- Amari Davis - FOY (2020)
- Lucas Stieber (2021)
- Cade Meyer (2022)
- Kamari McGee (2022)
- David Douglas Jr. (2024)
- Marcus Hall (2024)

Additional source:

=== All-Defensive Team ===
- Gary Grzesk (1996)
- Eric Jackson (1996)
- Kevin Olm (1997, 1998)
- Luke Kiss (1999)
- Jerry Carstensen (1998, 2000)
- Terry Evans (2006, 2007, 2008, 2009)
- Alec Brown (2013, 2014)
- Jordan Fouse (2013, 2014, 2015, 2016)
- Carrington Love (2016)
- Kenneth Lowe (2017)
- Khalil Small (2017, 2018)

Additional source:

== Mid-Continent Conference awards ==
=== Player of the Year ===
- Tony Bennett (1991,1992)

=== Freshman of the Year ===
- Tony Bennett (1989)

=== Coach of the Year ===
- Dick Bennett (1990,1992)

=== All-League First Team ===
- Jeff Nordgaard (1994)
- Dean Rondorf (1993)
- Tony Bennett (1990,1991,1992)

=== All-League Second Team ===
- Tony Bennett (1989)
- Frank Nardi (1988)
- Richard Sims (1984,1987,1988)

Additional source:
