= Noah Reynolds =

American basketball player (born 2002)

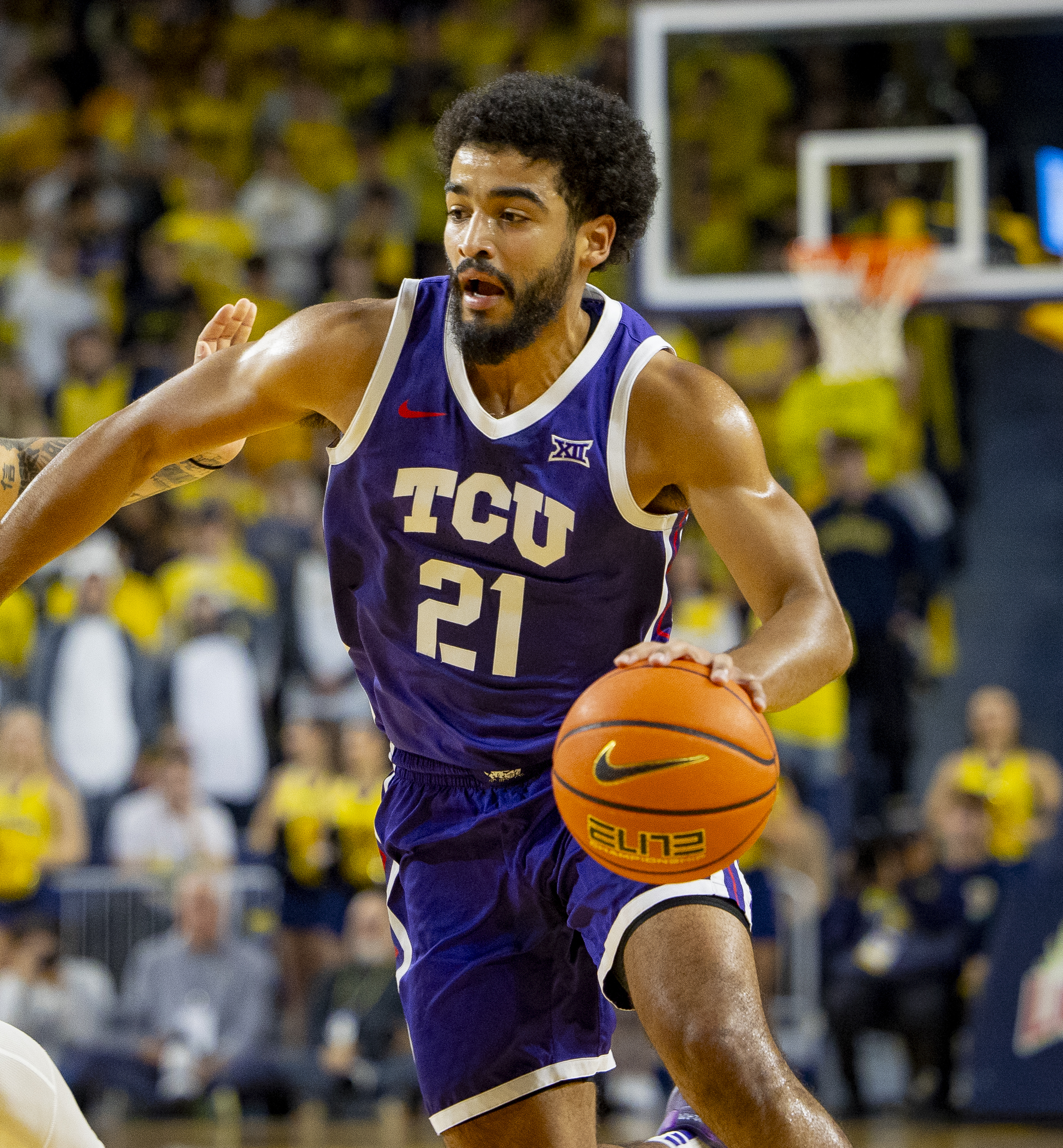

No. 21 – Wilki Morskie Szczecin
- Position: Point guard
- League: PLK

Personal information
- Born: November 11, 2002 (age 24)
- Listed height: 6 ft 3 in (1.91 m)
- Listed weight: 195 lb (88 kg)

Career information
- High school: Notre Dame (Peoria, Illinois)
- College: Wyoming (2021–2023); Green Bay (2023–2024); TCU (2024–2025)
- NBA draft: 2025: undrafted
- Playing career: 2025–present

Career history
- 2025–2026: Prievidza
- 2026–present: Wilki Morskie Szczecin

Career highlights
- Horizon League Newcomer of the Year (2024); First-team All-Horizon League (2024); All-Big 12 Honorable Mention (2025)

Noah Reynolds (born November 11, 2002) is an American professional basketball player for Wilki Morskie Szczecin of the Polish Basketball League (PLK). He played college basketball for the Wyoming Cowboys, Green Bay Phoenix, and TCU Horned Frogs.

== High school career ==
Reynolds attended Notre Dame High School in Peoria, Illinois. As a senior, Reynolds averaged 15.3 points, 6.3 assists, 5.6 rebounds, and 2.2 steals per game, before committing to play college basketball at the University of Wyoming.

== College career ==
=== Wyoming ===
As a freshman, Reynolds made an immediate impact for Wyoming, appearing in 23 games. The following season, he led Wyoming in scoring before his season was prematurely ended due to concussions. He finished the season appearing in 19 games, averaging 14.5 points, 2.2 rebounds, and 2.1 assists per game, before entering the transfer portal.

=== Green Bay ===
In April 2023, Reynolds announced that he would be transferring to the University of Wisconsin–Madison. However, Reynolds decommitted and instead he transferred to the University of Wisconsin–Green Bay to play for the Green Bay Phoenix. On December 29, 2023, he scored a career-high 39 points in an 88–77 victory over Wright State. He was named the Horizon League Newcomer of the Year in addition to first-team all-conference at the conclusion of the season. On March 25, 2024, he entered the transfer portal for a second time.

=== TCU ===
On April 22, 2024, Reynolds announced that he would be transferring to Texas Christian University to play for the TCU Horned Frogs.

== Professional career ==
On July 21, 2025, he signed with BC Prievidza of the Extraliga.

On July 17, 2026, he signed with Wilki Morskie Szczecin of the Polish Basketball League (PLK).

== Career statistics ==
Legend
| GP | Games played | GS | Games started | MPG | Minutes per game |
| FG% | Field goal percentage | 3P% | 3-point field goal percentage | FT% | Free throw percentage |
| RPG | Rebounds per game | APG | Assists per game | SPG | Steals per game |
| BPG | Blocks per game | PPG | Points per game | **Bold** | Career high |

=== College ===
| Year | Team | GP | GS | MPG | FG% | 3P% | FT% | RPG | APG | SPG | BPG | PPG |
|---|---|---|---|---|---|---|---|---|---|---|---|---|
| 2021–22 | Wyoming | 23 | 0 | 11.3 | .373 | .417 | .565 | 1.0 | .7 | .2 | .2 | 2.9 |
| 2022–23 | Wyoming | 19 | 10 | 24.9 | .481 | .329 | .662 | 2.2 | 2.1 | .4 | .2 | 14.5 |
| 2023–24 | Green Bay | 27 | 26 | 33.4 | .511 | .340 | .791 | 3.7 | 4.5 | .8 | .5 | 20.0 |
| 2024–25 | TCU | 31 | 30 | 31.5 | .427 | .341 | .745 | 2.2 | 3.0 | .7 | .1 | 12.5 |
