= 2022–23 Green Bay Phoenix men's basketball team =

American college basketball season

2022–23 Green Bay Phoenix men's basketball
- Conference: Horizon League
- Record: 3–29 (2–18 Horizon)
- Head coach: Will Ryan (3rd season; first 21 games); Freddie Owens (interim)
- Assistant coaches: Jared Swenson; Brandon Pritzl
- Home arena: Resch Center; Kress Events Center

2022–23 Horizon League men's basketball standings
	Conf.				Overall
Team	W		L	PCT	W		L	PCT
Youngstown State	15	–	5	.750	24	–	10	.706
Milwaukee	14	–	6	.700	22	–	12	.647
Cleveland State	14	–	6	.700	21	–	14	.600
Northern Kentucky †	14	–	6	.700	22	–	13	.629
Oakland	11	–	9	.550	13	–	19	.406
Wright State	10	–	10	.500	18	–	15	.545
Robert Morris	10	–	10	.500	16	–	17	.485
Detroit Mercy	9	–	11	.450	14	–	19	.424
Purdue Fort Wayne	9	–	11	.450	17	–	15	.531
IUPUI	2	–	18	.100	5	–	27	.156
Green Bay	2	–	18	.100	3	–	29	.094
† 2023 Horizon League tournament winner

The 2022–23 Green Bay Phoenix men's basketball team represented the University of Wisconsin–Green Bay during the 2022–23 NCAA Division I men's basketball season. The Phoenix, led by interim head coach Freddie Owens, split their home games between the Resch Center in Ashwaubenon, Wisconsin and the Kress Events Center in Green Bay, Wisconsin. The Phoenix finished the season 3–29, 2–18 in Horizon League play to finish in a tie for last place. As the No. 10 seed in the Horizon League tournament, they lost to Wright State in the first round.

On January 31, 2023, third-year head coach Will Ryan was fired after starting the season 2–19. Assistant coach Freddie Owens was named interim head coach for the rest of the season. On March 14, the school named Wyoming assistant coach Sundance Wicks the team's new head coach.

== Previous season ==
The Phoenix finished the 2021–22 season 5–25, 4–16 Horizon League play to finish in 11th place. They lost in the first round of the Horizon League tournament to Detroit Mercy.

== Offseason ==
=== Departures ===
Green Bay Departures
Name	Number	Pos.	Height	Weight	Year	Hometown	Reason for departure
Emmanuel Ansong	23	F	6'4"	195	Junior	Bordentown, NJ	Transferred to Vanderbilt
Ryan Claflin	13	F	6'6"	190	Freshman	Brussels, WI	Transferred to Palm Beach Atlantic
Donovan Ivory	15	G	6'6"		RS Sophomore	Kaukauna, WI	Transferred to Southern Miss
Japannah Kellogg III	3	F	6'8"	190	RS Freshman	Ames, IA	Transferred to Albany
Cem Kirciman	12	F	6'8"	220	Freshman	Bursa, Turkey	Transferred to Lewis
Mitch Listau	1	G	6'4"		RS Sophomore	Waunakee, WI	Graduated
Tutu Majok	21	F	6'9"		Sophomore	Cairo, Egypt	Transferred to USAO
Kamari McGee	2	G	6'0"		Freshman	Racine, WI	Transferred to Wisconsin
Donavan Moore	0	G	6'3"	180	Sophomore	Hillsboro, IL	Transferred to Lindenwood
Lucas Stieber	5	G	6'3"	185	RS Freshman	Green Bay, WI	Transferred to Gardner–Webb
Blayton Williams	4	G	6'3"	175	Junior	West Memphis, AR	Transferred to Mississippi College

=== Incoming transfers ===
Green Bay incoming transfers
Name	Number	Pos.	Height	Weight	Year	Hometown	Previous School
Zae Blake	5	G	6'1"		Sophomore	Washington, D.C.	Southwest Mississippi CC
Clarence Cummings III	3	F	6'5"		RS Sophomore	Orlando, FL	State College of Florida
Garren Davis	0	G	6'4"		Junior	Dallas, TX	Clarendon
Brock Heffner	24	F	6'8"		RS Freshman	Grafton, WI	Hawaii
Zane Short	2	G	6'6"		Junior	Denmark, WI	Indian River CC
Ryan Wade	32	G	6'2"		Senior	Ann Arbor, MI	Central Michigan
Davin Zeigler	4	G	6'3"		Junior	Selma, NC	Indian Hills CC

=== 2022 recruiting class ===
College recruiting information
Name	Hometown	School	Height	Weight	Commit date
Amari Jedkins; PF	Racine, WI	Case	6 ft 7 in (2.01 m)	N/A	Apr 14, 2022
Amari Jedkins; PF	Recruit ratings: No ratings found				
Jack Rose; SG	Salem, WI	Westosha Central	6 ft 3 in (1.91 m)	165 lb (75 kg)	May 16, 2022
Jack Rose; SG	Recruit ratings: No ratings found				
Donavan Short; C	Denmark, WI	Denmark	6 ft 10 in (2.08 m)	210 lb (95 kg)	Sep 12, 2021
Donavan Short; C	Recruit ratings: Rivals: 247Sports:				
Overall recruit ranking:
Note: In many cases, Scout, Rivals, 247Sports, On3, and ESPN may conflict in their listings of height and weight.; In these cases, the average was taken. ESPN grades are on a 100-point scale.; Sources: "2022 Team Ranking". Rivals.

== Preseason ==
The Panthers were picked to finish in tenth place in the Horizon League in the coaches' poll, receiving a total of 111 points.

== Roster ==
2022–23 Green Bay Phoenix men's basketball team
Players
Coaches

Pos.	#	Name	Height	Weight	Year	Previous school	Hometown
G	0	Garren Davis	6 ft 4 in (1.93 m)	—	Jr	The Colony/Clarendon	Dallas, Texas
G	1	Randy Tucker	6 ft 4 in (1.93 m)	—	RS Jr	Rock Island/Vincennes	Rock Island, Illinois
G	2	Zane Short	6 ft 6 in (1.98 m)	—	Jr	Denmark/Indian River	Waunakee, Wisconsin
F	3	Clarence Cummings III	6 ft 5 in (1.96 m)	—	RS So	Maynard Evans/SCF	Orlando, Florida
G	4	Davin Ziegler	6 ft 3 in (1.91 m)	—	Jr	Benedictine/Indian Hills	Cleveland, Ohio
G	5	Zae Blake	6 ft 1 in (1.85 m)	—	So	Hargrave/SW Mississippi	Washington, D.C.
F	11	Cade Meyer	6 ft 8 in (2.03 m)	—	So	Monroe	Monroe, Wisconsin
C	13	Donavan Short	6 ft 10 in (2.08 m)	—	Fr	Denmark	Denmark, Wisconsin
F	15	Amari Jedkins	6 ft 7 in (2.01 m)	—	Fr	Case	Racine, Wisconsin
G	21	Jack Rose	6 ft 5 in (1.96 m)	—	Fr	Westosha Central	Bristol, Wisconsin
F	22	Brayden Dailey	6 ft 7 in (2.01 m)	—	RS Fr	Cuba City	Cuba City, Wisconsin
F	24	Brock Heffner	6 ft 8 in (2.03 m)	—	RS Fr	Grafton/Hawaii	Grafton, Wisconsin
G	32	Ryan Wade	6 ft 2 in (1.88 m)	—	Sr	Skyline/Central Michigan	Ann Arbor, Michigan
G	55	Nate Jenkins	6 ft 2 in (1.88 m)	—	Jr	Kettle Moraine/Iowa State	Delafield, Wisconsin

Head coach

- Will Ryan (Milwaukee)

Assistant coach(es)

- Jared Swanson (Concordia-Moorhead)
- Freddie Owens (Wisconsin)
- Brandon Pritzl (Hillsdale)

Legend

- (C) Team captain
- (S) Suspended
- (I) Ineligible
- (W) Walk-on
- Injured
- Current redshirt

Roster
Last update: November 15, 2022

== Schedule and results ==
Date time, TV	Rank^{#}	Opponent^{#}	Result	Record	High points	High rebounds	High assists	Site (attendance) city, state
Exhibition
October 25, 2022*; 7:00pm		St. Norbert	W 50–45		–	–	–	Resch Center; Ashwaubenon, WI
November 3, 2022*; 7:00pm		Michigan Tech	W 72–66		–	–	–	Kress Events Center; Green Bay, WI
Regular season
November 7, 2022*; 6:00pm, ESPN3		at Indiana State	L 53–80	0–1	19 – Zeigler	8 – Zeigler	3 – Meyer	Hulman Center (2,739); Terre Haute, IN
November 12, 2022*; 5:30 pm, Fox Sports		at Georgetown; Jamaica Classic campus game	L 58–92	0–2	13 – Blake	5 – Cummings III	3 – Meyer	Capital One Arena (4,583); Washington, D.C.
November 15, 2022*; 8:00 pm, BTN		at Wisconsin	L 45–56	0–3	15 – Blake	5 – Zeigler	2 – Tied	Kohl Center (14,204); Madison, WI
November 18, 2022*; 10:30 am, HBCU GO		Queens; Jamaica Classic semifinals	L 65-81	0–4	10 – Meyer	5 – Jenkins	5 – Jenkins	Montego Bay Convention Centre; Montego Bay, Jamaica
November 20, 2022*; 6:30pm, WCWF		Utah Valley; Jamaica Classic third place game	L 56-79	0–5	16 – Cummings III	4 – Blake	3 – Blake	Montego Bay Convention Centre (5,128); Montego Bay, Jamaica
November 26, 2022*; 6:00 pm, ESPN+		UIC	L 64–78	0–6	19 – Heffner	5 – Tied	3 – Cummings III	Kress Events Center (1,200); Green Bay, WI
December 1, 2022; 7:00 pm, ESPN+		Milwaukee	L 67–81	0–7 (0–1)	19 – Meyer	6 – Blake	3 – Tied	Resch Center (1,217); Ashwaubenon, WI
December 5, 2022; 11:00 am, ESPN+		IUPUI	W 68–61	1–7 (1–1)	20 – Blake	9 – Tucker	4 – Tied	Resch Center (4,290); Ashwaubenon, WI
December 6, 2022*; 7:00 pm, NBCSCHI		at Loyola Chicago	L 46–70	1–8	15 – Meyer	5 – Tied	3 – Blake	Joseph J. Gentile Arena (2,645); Chicago, IL
December 10, 2022*; 7:00 pm, ESPN+		Kansas City	W 70–64	2–8	25 – Meyer	7 – Meyer	3 – Tied	Resch Center (1,625); Ashwaubenon, WI
December 13, 2022*; 7:00 pm, TAA		at St. Thomas	L 61–82	2–9	24 – Meyer	8 – Cummings III	7 – Blake	Schoenecker Arena (1,036); St. Paul, MN
December 16, 2022*; 7:00 pm, P12N		at Stanford	L 40–85	2–10	10 – Tied	7 – Tucker	2 – Cummings III	Maples Pavilion (2,583); Stanford, CA
December 18, 2022*; 2:00 pm, P12N		at Oregon State	L 56–65	2–11	16 – Cummings III	7 – Cummings III	4 – Heffner	Gill Coliseum (2,581); Corvallis, OR
December 29, 2022; 6:00 pm, ESPN+		at Detroit Mercy	L 59–76	2–12 (1–2)	14 – Blake	6 – Meyer	5 – Blake	Calihan Hall (1,543); Detroit, MI
December 31, 2022; 2:00 pm, ESPN+		at Oakland	L 65–81	2–13 (1–3)	17 – Tucker	6 – Tied	6 – Blake	Athletics Center O'Rena (1,901); Auburn Hills, MI
January 5, 2023; 6:00 pm, ESPN+		at Purdue Fort Wayne	L 69–79	2–14 (1–4)	23 – Cummings III	11 – Meyer	4 – Blake	Memorial Coliseum (1,473); Fort Wayne, IN
January 7, 2023; 2:00 pm, ESPN+		at Cleveland State	L 77–82	2–15 (1–5)	18 – Tied	9 – Meyer	6 – Tied	Wolstein Center (1,906); Cleveland, OH
January 12, 2023; 7:00 pm, ESPN+		Wright State	L 67–99	2–16 (1–6)	13 – Meyer	7 – Cummings III	4 – Cummings III	Resch Center (2,409); Ashwaubenon, WI
January 14, 2023; 6:00 pm, ESPN+		Northern Kentucky	L 53–74	2–17 (1–7)	14 – Tucker	5 – Tied	7 – Wade	Resch Center (1,624); Ashwaubenon, WI
January 19, 2023; 6:00 pm, ESPN+		Youngstown State	L 70–86	2–18 (1–8)	24 – Heffner	6 – Davis	2 – Tied	Resch Center (1,261); Ashwaubenon, WI
January 21, 2023; 6:00 pm, ESPN+		Robert Morris	L 38–72	2–19 (1–9)	11 – Tucker	7 – Tucker	2 – Tied	Resch Center (1,600); Ashwaubenon, WI
January 26, 2023; 6:00 pm, ESPN+		at Northern Kentucky	L 50–68	2–20 (1–10)	16 – Meyer	8 – Meyer	4 – Wade	Truist Arena (2,622); Highland Heights, KY
January 28, 2023; 6:00 pm, ESPN+		at Wright State	L 46–77	2–21 (1–11)	10 – Meyer	9 – Meyer	2 – Jenkins	Nutter Center (5,418); Dayton, OH
February 4, 2023; 12:00 pm, ESPN+		at IUPUI	L 53–68	2–22 (1–12)	16 – Meyer	7 – Meyer	3 – Rose	Indiana Farmers Coliseum (752); Indianapolis, IN
February 6, 2023; 8:00 pm, ESPN+		at Milwaukee	W 80–79 ^{OT}	3–22 (2–12)	20 – Tucker	8 – Tucker	6 – Zeigler	UWM Panther Arena (2,419); Milwaukee, WI
February 9, 2023; 7:00 pm, ESPN+		Oakland	L 47–59	3–23 (2–13)	14 – Zeigler	10 – Meyer	4 – Wade	Kress Center (1,401); Green Bay, WI
February 11, 2023; 6:00 pm, ESPN+		Detroit Mercy	L 71–76	3–24 (2–14)	20 – Cummings III	11 – Meyer	3 – Tucker	Kress Center (1,403); Green Bay, WI
February 16, 2023; 6:00 pm, ESPN+		at Robert Morris	L 56–71	3–25 (2–15)	12 – Cummings III	5 – Cummings III	3 – Wade	UPMC Events Center (915); Moon Township, PA
February 18, 2023; 6:00 pm, ESPN+		at Youngstown State	L 65–95	3–26 (2–16)	14 – Meyer	10 – Meyer	5 – Wade	Beeghly Center (3,283); Youngstown, OH
February 23, 2023; 8:00 pm, ESPN+		Cleveland State	L 65–76	3–27 (2–17)	14 – Zeigler	6 – Tucker	5 – Tucker	Kress Center (1,305); Green Bay, WI
February 25, 2023; 6:00 pm, ESPN+		Purdue Fort Wayne	L 61–78	3–28 (2–18)	19 – Tucker	8 – Cummings III	4 – Wade	Kress Center (1,361); Green Bay, WI
Horizon League tournament
February 28, 2023; 6:00 pm, ESPN+	(10)	at (7) Wright State; First round	L 57–77	3–29	20 – Tucker	6 – Tucker	4 – Wade	Nutter Center (2,597); Dayton, OH
*Non-conference game. ^{#}Rankings from AP Poll. (#) Tournament seedings in parentheses. All times are in Central.
