= Tod Kowalczyk =

American basketball coach (born 1966)

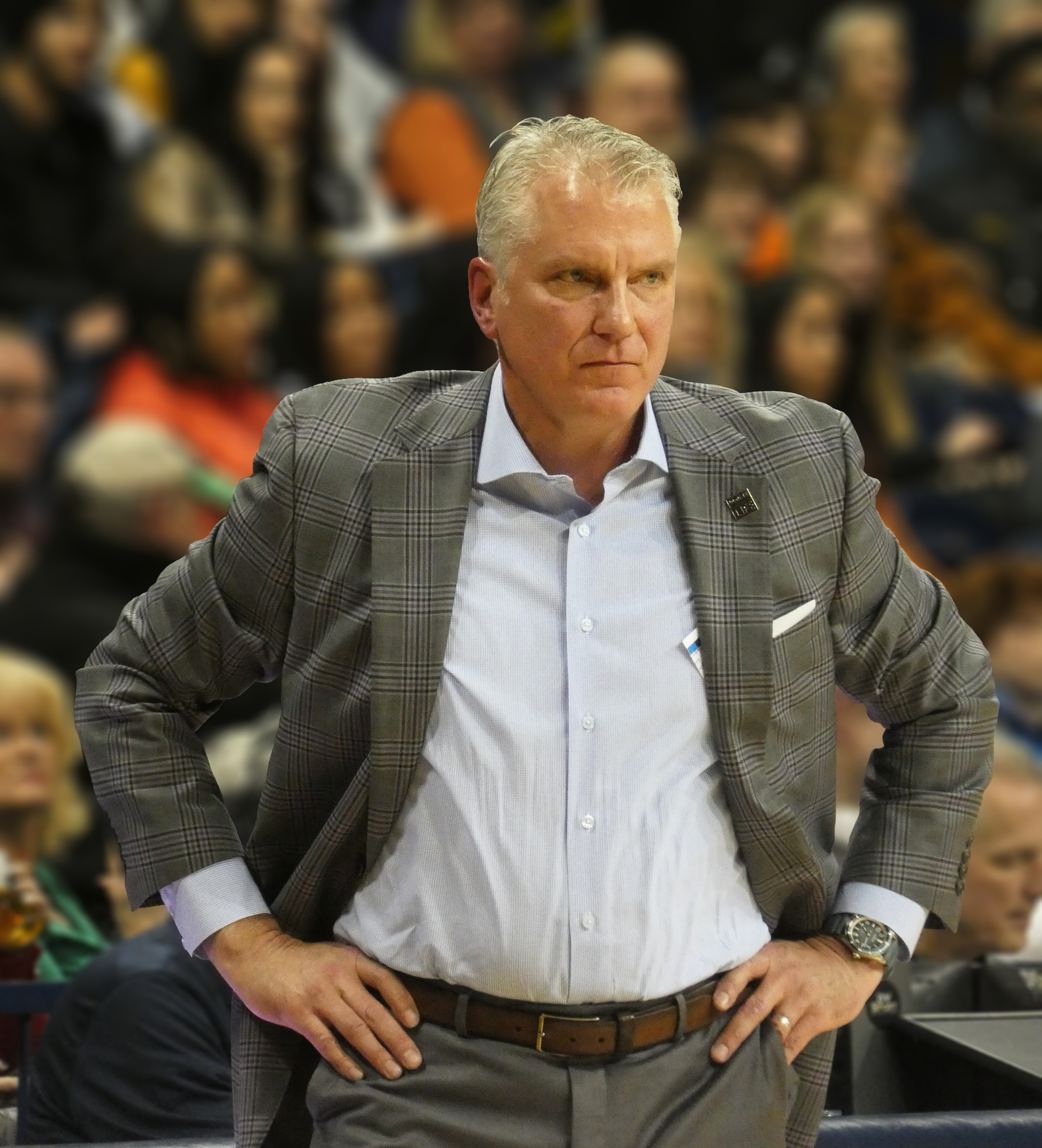
- Kowalczyk in 2022

Current position
- Title: Head coach
- Team: Toledo
- Conference: MAC
- Record: 315–211 (.599)

Biographical details
- Born: June 19, 1966 (age 60); Green Bay, Wisconsin, U.S.

Playing career
- 1985–1988: Minnesota–Duluth

Coaching career (HC unless noted)
- 1988–1989: Minnesota–Duluth (assistant)
- 1989–1991: New Hampshire (assistant)
- 1991–1993: Saint Anselm (assistant)
- 1993–1997: Rider (assistant)
- 1997–2000: Rutgers (assistant)
- 2000–2002: Marquette (assistant)
- 2002–2010: Green Bay
- 2010–present: Toledo

Head coaching record
- Overall: 451–323 (.583)
- Tournaments: 0–5 (NIT); 1–3 (CBI); 1–1 (CIT)

Accomplishments and honors

Championships
- 5 MAC regular season (2014, 2021–2024); 4 MAC West Division (2013, 2014, 2018, 2019)

Awards
- 2× MAC Coach of the Year (2021, 2023)

Tod Edward Kowalczyk (born June 19, 1966) is an American college basketball coach and current head men's basketball coach at the University of Toledo. He was the head coach at the University of Wisconsin-Green Bay from 2002–10, before accepting the head coaching position at Toledo on March 30, 2010. In 24 seasons as a head coach, he has won the regular season championship five times but has never made the NCAA tournament.

== Head coaching record ==
Record table
Season	Team	Overall	Conference	Standing	Postseason
Green Bay Phoenix (Horizon League) (2002–2010)
2002–03	Green Bay	10–20	4–12	T–6th	
2003–04	Green Bay	17–11	11–5	3rd	
2004–05	Green Bay	17–11	10–6	2nd	
2005–06	Green Bay	15–16	8–8	T–3rd	
2006–07	Green Bay	18–15	7–9	T–4th	
2007–08	Green Bay	15–15	9–9	T–6th	
2008–09	Green Bay	22–11	13–5	2nd	CBI first round
2009–10	Green Bay	22–13	11–7	3rd	CBI second round
Green Bay:		136–112 (.548)	73–61 (.545)		
Toledo Rockets (Mid-American Conference) (2010–Present)
2010–11	Toledo	4–28	1–15	6th (West)	
2011–12	Toledo	19–17	7–9	2nd (West)	CIT second round
2012–13	Toledo	15–13	10–6	T–1st (West)	
2013–14	Toledo	27–7	14–4	T–1st (West)	NIT first round
2014–15	Toledo	20–13	11–7	T–2nd (West)	
2015–16	Toledo	17–15	8–10	5th (West)	
2016–17	Toledo	17–17	9–9	3rd (West)	CBI first round
2017–18	Toledo	23–11	13–5	1st (West)	
2018–19	Toledo	25–8	13–5	1st (West)	NIT first round
2019–20	Toledo	17–15	8–10	T–3rd (West)	
2020–21	Toledo	21–9	15–4	1st	NIT first round
2021–22	Toledo	26–8	17–3	1st	NIT first round
2022–23	Toledo	27–8	16–2	1st	NIT first round
2023–24	Toledo	20–12	14–4	1st	
2024–25	Toledo	18–15	10–8	T–4th	
2025–26	Toledo	19–15	11–7	4th	
2026–27	Toledo	0–0	0–0		
Toledo:		315–211 (.599)	177–108 (.621)		
Total:		451–323 (.583)			
National champion Postseason invitational champion Conference regular season champion Conference regular season and conference tournament champion Division regular season champion Division regular season and conference tournament champion Conference tournament champion
