= Mike Heideman =

American basketball coach

Biographical details
- Born: March 29, 1948; Appleton, Wisconsin, U.S.
- Died: June 30, 2018 (aged 70); Green Bay, Wisconsin, U.S.
- Education: University of Wisconsin–La Crosse

Coaching career (HC unless noted)
- 1982–1986: St. Norbert
- 1986–1995: Green Bay (asst.)
- 1995–2002: Green Bay
- 2002–2003: Valparaiso (asst.)
- 2003–2006: Washington State (asst.)
- 2006–2009: Washington State (Dir. Ops.)
- 2009–201?: St. Mary Central HS

Accomplishments and honors

Championships
- MCC regular season (1996)

Awards
- MCC Coach of the Year (1996)

Michael David Heideman (March 29, 1948 – June 30, 2018) was an American athletic coach, at Xavier High School in Appleton, Wisconsin, and head men's basketball coach for the University of Wisconsin–Green Bay.

Heideman was born in Appleton, Wisconsin and graduated from Xavier High School, in Appleton, in 1966. He received his bachelor's and master's degree from University of Wisconsin–La Crosse. Heideman died from cancer in Green Bay, Wisconsin.
