= Doug Gottlieb =

American college basketball coach and analyst

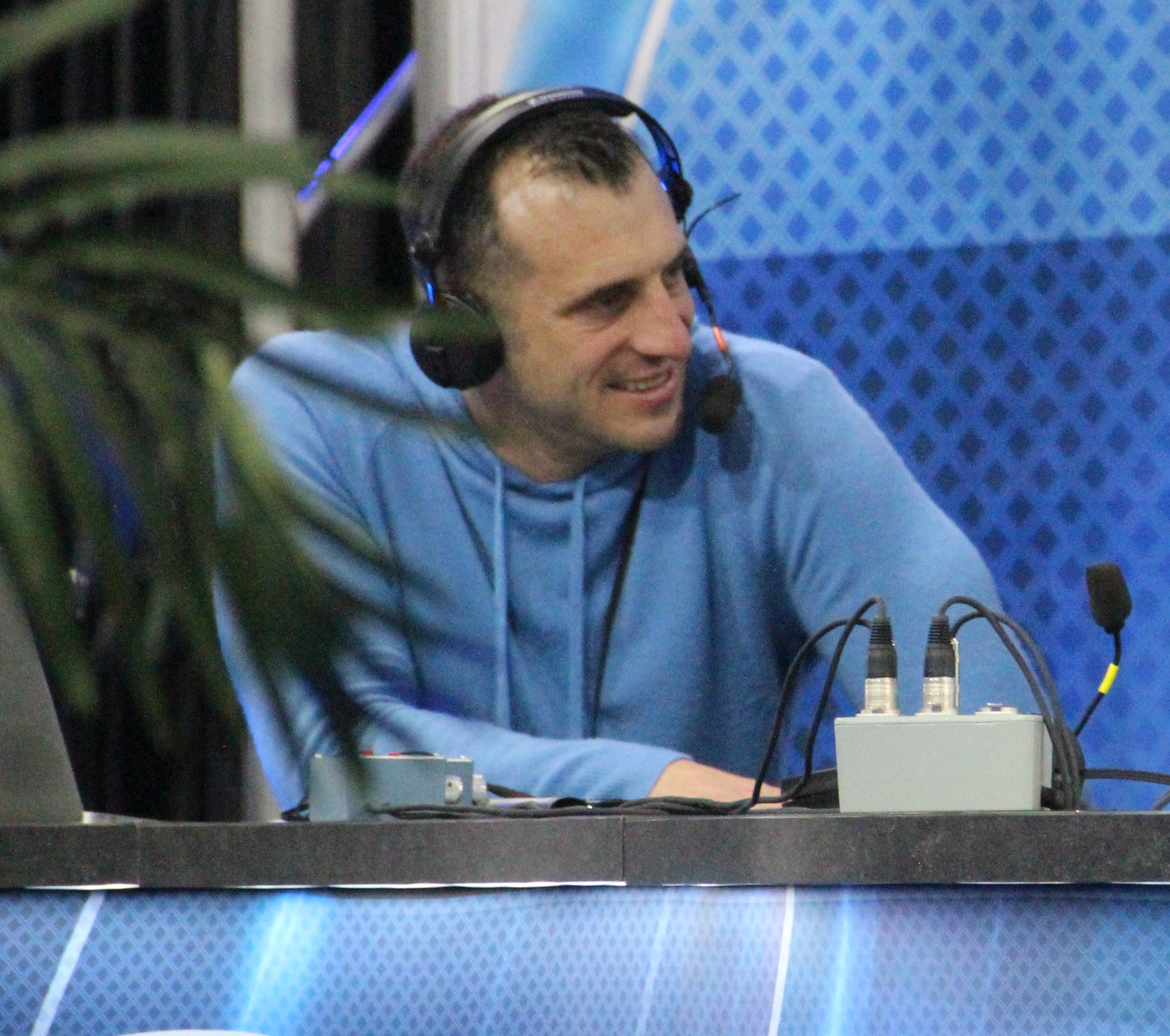
- Gottlieb in 2019

Current position
- Title: Head coach
- Team: Green Bay
- Conference: Horizon League
- Record: 25–47 (.347)

Biographical details
- Born: January 15, 1976 (age 50); Milwaukee, Wisconsin, U.S.
- Height: 6 ft 1 in (185 cm)

Playing career
- 1995–1996: Notre Dame
- 1996–1997: Golden West
- 1997–2000: Oklahoma State
- 2000: Oklahoma Storm
- 2000–2001: Salina Rattlers
- 2001: Ural Great Perm
- 2001–2002: Maccabi Ra'anana
- 2002–2003: Stade Clermontois BA
- Position: Point guard

Coaching career (HC unless noted)
- 2024–present: Green Bay

Head coaching record
- Overall: 25–47 (.347)

Douglas Mitchell Gottlieb (born January 15, 1976) is an American men's college basketball coach, former media personality and player. Doug is the current head men's basketball coach at the University of Wisconsin–Green Bay. He played NCAA collegiate basketball, twice leading the nation in assists, and professional basketball (including USBL, leading the league in assists). As a sports talk radio host and analyst, he last worked for Fox Sports after tenures with the Pac-12 Network, CBS Sports, and ESPN.

== Basketball-playing career ==
=== College basketball ===
After signing a national letter of intent with Notre Dame, Gottlieb was their starting point guard during the 1995–96 college basketball season, starting all but the first four games and leading the team with 154 assists as well as steals and minutes played. Gottlieb was widely known at this time for his efficient ball-handling skills. He left Notre Dame after an incident in which he stole a classmate's credit card and used it to charge multiple purchases.

Despite offers from Cincinnati, Alabama, and others to transfer and sit out a season on their campus, Gottlieb chose to sit out his transfer year at Golden West College. GWC was coached by his former Tustin High School coach Tom McCluskey, and Gottlieb took on the role of redshirt player/coach. He practiced with the team and traveled to road games as the assistant coach.

Gottlieb was perceived to be waiting on Baron Davis to choose a school, as UCLA and Georgia Tech both indicated that Gottlieb was their second choice, after Davis. After Davis chose UCLA, where Gottlieb's family had season tickets for 20 years and his brother and sister were alums (sister was captain of the cheer squad), Gottlieb looked elsewhere to play college ball. His final schools were Marquette, Georgia Tech, Alabama, Oklahoma State, Utah, Oregon, and Tennessee. In 1997, Gottlieb accepted an offer from Oklahoma State coach Eddie Sutton (under whom Gottlieb's father had once been assistant coach) to attend the university. He immediately took over as point guard for an Oklahoma State team that had gone 17–15 in consecutive years, and led the Cowboys to the NCAA tournament.

During his second year with Oklahoma State, Gottlieb led the NCAA in assists, with 299, and also led the nation in assists per game, with 8.8, only the second Cowboy to lead the nation in a statistical category. He also started setting Oklahoma State assist records, breaking the school career mark with 500 (after only two seasons) and broke the school record of 22 career double-figure assist games. In a game against Florida Atlantic, Gottlieb set a school record and tied the Big 12 mark with 18 assists, and in the Big 12 tournament, he set the record for assists in a game (14) as well as in tournament play (38). He led the Big 12 in games, with 34. The 1998–99 season culminated with another trip to the NCAA tournament.

As a senior, Gottlieb again led the NCAA in assists, with 293, and finished second in the nation in assists per game with 8.6. He was 7th in the Big 12 in both steals, with 53, and games, with 34. Gottlieb's senior season ended with a third consecutive trip to the NCAA tournament, and the team made it all the way to the Elite Eight.

Gottlieb notably entered a game with his shorts on backwards. He then took his shorts off while on the court, and put them back on correctly. He was guarded from cameras and taunting fans by a circle that his teammates formed around their embarrassed teammate. When Gottlieb became a broadcaster after his playing days ended, this incident was mentioned in a press conference by North Carolina head coach Roy Williams. After being questioned about criticism of his program by Gottlieb, Williams responded that Gottlieb "couldn't even put his pants on the right way." Williams then said "shorts on backwards, shorts on backwards," imitating the chant that opposing fans said to Gottlieb after the incident.

Gottlieb broke all of Oklahoma State's assist records, and currently ranks eleventh all-time in NCAA career assists, with 947. He graduated from Oklahoma State in 2000 with a bachelor's degree in marketing.

=== Professional basketball ===
After graduating from college, Gottlieb went undrafted in the NBA draft but was the first pick of the Oklahoma Storm in the 2000 United States Basketball League draft. Gottlieb's season with the Storm was successful, as he led the USBL in assists and helped the Storm to a 2nd-place finish in the team's inaugural season (losing to the Dodge City Legend in the USBL Championship Game).

The Idaho Stampede of the Continental Basketball Association signed Gottlieb on November 28, 2000, prior to training camp, and then released him on December 13, two days before their opening game. On December 28, he signed with the Salina Rattlers of the (now defunct) International Basketball Association, and played in six games (four starts) before the team released him due to Gottlieb's intent to play overseas.

Gottlieb then took his basketball career overseas, starting with a stop in Israel after signing with Maccabi Ra'anana. In addition, Gottlieb played at the professional level in Russia and France.

In February 2001, he joined Ural Great Perm of the Russian Basketball Federation, and helped the team win the league championship.

Following Ural's season, Gottlieb traveled to Israel and won a gold medal as the MVP for the United States team at the 2001 Maccabiah Games. In the title game, the U.S. team defeated Israel 82–71.

Shortly after in 2001, Gottlieb played for the Los Angeles Lakers in the NBA Summer League. He then returned to Maccabi Ra'anana for the 2001–02 season. He then was invited to return to the Oklahoma Storm for the 2002 season. However, he and new coach Kareem Abdul-Jabbar did not see eye-to-eye, and was released after eight games.

== Broadcast career ==
In 2002, Gottlieb co-hosted a midday sports talk show on Oklahoma City radio station WWLS 640 AM, known locally as "The Sports Animal". Gottlieb took the job in Oklahoma City only after securing a job to call college basketball games on ESPN and ESPN Regional. In addition, Gottlieb called Oklahoma State games for the Cowboy Basketball Network. At the end of the 2002–2003 season, Gottlieb returned to France to play for Clermont-Ferrand. Upon returning stateside he worked out with the Minnesota Timberwolves Summer League team and co-hosted the NBA draft on ESPN Radio.

Gottlieb was hired by ESPN Radio in September 2003 as co-host of ESPN Radio's GameNight. Gamenight was ESPN Radio's longest running show. Gottlieb's co-host was Chuck Wilson, one of the original voices of ESPN Radio. Gottlieb would also fill in on The Dan Patrick Show, The Herd with Colin Cowherd and began hosting The NBA Today on Sundays. Meanwhile, he also continued to call college basketball games on ESPN's family of networks. He also worked as a studio analyst for ESPNews during the NCAA tournament.

Gottlieb was asked by ESPN to help launch ESPNU from Charlotte. The fledgling network was a company priority, and based upon his age, his relationship with Mike Hall, the host, and the launch being March 4, the heart of college basketball season, Gottlieb accepted the position and stayed in Charlotte for a month.

The next basketball season, Gottlieb became a mainstay on SportsCenter and as an analyst on ESPN and ESPN2 games. He caused a stir when he questioned the logic in the Big Ten's officiating crews. His segment "Point of Contention" was just that, a contentious look at previously untouchable college coaches and issues. On radio, Gottlieb would move to host The Pulse weekday evenings from 8 to 10 Eastern before moving to afternoon drive (4 p.m. to 7 p.m. ET). He also served as a college basketball analyst for ESPNEWS and wrote for ESPN.com. Gottlieb was also a frequent guest on other ESPN television shows including College Basketball Gameday Final. He occasionally appeared on the shows SportsNation and Mike and Mike in the Morning as a guest host.

Gottlieb and Syracuse basketball coach Jim Boeheim have traded barbs since 2005 because of Gottlieb's criticism of what he regards as Syracuse's soft nonconference schedule and Boeheim's comments regarding Gottlieb's difficulties at Notre Dame. Boeheim has discussed their feud publicly.

On July 31, 2012, Gottlieb announced that he was leaving ESPN to join CBS. He served as a studio and game analyst for CBS Sports’ coverage of regular-season college basketball and joint coverage with Turner Sports of the NCAA basketball tournament. Gottlieb co-hosted a nightly television show on CBS Sports Network called Leadoff. His co-host was Allie LaForce, the former Miss Teen USA, who has become CBS' lead sideline reporter for college football. In addition to Leadoff, The Doug Gottlieb Show was moved to the new CBS Sports Radio network. Gottlieb's commentary and conversational interviewing style followed his show from ESPN Radio to CBS Sports Radio.

In 2013, Gottlieb started participating in the CBS Sports Minute on CBS Radio stations throughout the country. In 2014, CBS decided to move the Doug Gottlieb Show to a TV simulcast format. Essentially canceling Leadoff, Gottlieb's radio show and his longtime producer Adam Klug moved to New York City, where the show was on both radio and television at 3 p.m. Eastern on weekdays.

Beginning in April 2017, Gottlieb worked as a basketball analyst and radio host for Fox Sports. The Doug Gottlieb Show moved to Fox Sports Radio. Gottlieb was also an occasional substitute host on Fox Sports 1 (FS1)'s The Herd with Colin Cowherd, replacing original host Cowherd when he was on vacation.

In June 2022, Gottlieb tweeted that Casey Close, the sports agent for Freddie Freeman, did not present the Atlanta Braves' final offer to Freeman before he signed with the Los Angeles Dodgers. Close sued Gottlieb for libel in July. In September, Gottlieb acknowledged that he was wrong, based on incorrect information that he gathered from his sources, and apologized to Close.

On December 19, 2025, The Doug Gottlieb Show aired its final live radio broadcast on Fox Sports Radio, two days following his announcement that he would step away from live radio but will continue to podcast via the All Ball platform and iHeartMedia.

On January 17, 2026, The Doug Gottlieb Show re-emerged as a weekly produced show, broadcasting twice weekly on WFRV+ with distribution on the iHeartMedia podcast network.

== Coaching ==
Along with then-University of Tennessee coach Bruce Pearl, Gottlieb helped coach the United States team at the 2009 Maccabiah Games. He coached Team USA in basketball at the 2017 Maccabiah Games, winning a gold medal as the USA defeated France in the final in Jerusalem. He had formerly won a gold medal at the Maccabiah Games as a player, but said "It is more special to win as a coach."

On May 14, 2024, Gottlieb was named the head men's basketball coach at Green Bay.

In Gottlieb's first season with Green Bay, the team won two of their first five games before going on a 21-game losing streak that lasted into February. At a press conference after losing a home game to Milwaukee, he referred to playing perceived weaker teams as "Nobody U". Days later, his team lost to Michigan Tech, a Division II team. On February 16, 2025, Green Bay snapped their 21-game losing streak by defeating Wright State 79–68.

On December 17, 2025, after Green Bay's 67–64 win over UC Santa Barbara, Gottlieb announced at the postgame press conference that he will step away from his daily radio show at Fox Sports Radio but continue to podcast on his All Ball platform.

On June 19, 2026, Gottlieb signed a contract extension with Green Bay lasting through the 2030–31 season.

== Head coaching record ==
Record table
Season	Team	Overall	Conference	Standing	Postseason
Green Bay Phoenix (Horizon League) (2024–present)
2024–25	Green Bay	4–28	2–18	11th	
2025–26	Green Bay	18–15	12–8	T–3rd	
2026–27	Green Bay	3–4	0–0		
Green Bay:		25–47 (.347)	14–26 (.350)		
Total:		25–47 (.347)			

== Honors ==
On June 26, 2011, Gottlieb was inducted into the Southern California Jewish Sports Hall of Fame. He is a member of the Oklahoma State University Foundation Board of Governors. In January 2016, Gottlieb became a national spokesman for the American Cancer Society.

== Personal life ==
Gottlieb was born in Milwaukee while his father, Bob Gottlieb, was the head coach of the Milwaukee Panthers men's basketball team. Gottlieb is Jewish.

In November 2014, Bob Gottlieb, Doug's father, died of cancer. Gottlieb shared his father's death on Facebook and dozens of basketball teams at the high school and college levels wore orange in Bob's honor. His brother Gregg is an assistant coach for the San Diego State Aztecs women's basketball team. His sister Wendy is currently a board member for the Acalanes Union High School District.

== See also ==
- List of NCAA Division I men's basketball career assists leaders
- List of NCAA Division I men's basketball season assists leaders
