= Will Ryan (basketball) =

American basketball player and coach

Current position
- Title: Assistant coach
- Team: Southern Utah
- Conference: Big Sky

Biographical details
- Born: July 8, 1978 (age 48)

Playing career
- 1997–1999: Wisconsin–Platteville
- 2000–2002: Milwaukee

Coaching career (HC unless noted)
- 2002–2004: Wisconsin (GA)
- 2004–2005: Wisconsin (VC)
- 2005–2007: Wisconsin (DBO)
- 2007–2014: North Dakota State (assistant)
- 2014–2019: Ohio (assistant)
- 2019–2020: Wheeling
- 2020–2023: Green Bay
- 2025–present: Southern Utah (assistant)

Head coaching record
- Overall: 29–74 (.282)

Accomplishments and honors

Championships
- As Assistant Coach: 2× Summit League tournament winner (2009, 2014)

William Francis Ryan III (born July 8, 1978) is an American college basketball coach who is currently an assistant coach at Southern Utah. He was previously the head coach of the Green Bay Phoenix men's basketball team.

== Early life and education ==
Ryan is a native of Platteville, Wisconsin. He began his college basketball career at Wisconsin–Platteville. He helped the team win two Division III championships in 1998 and 1999. Ryan transferred to Milwaukee and played his senior season under Bruce Pearl. Ryan graduated from Milwaukee in December 2002 with a bachelor's degree in educational studies and youth leadership.

== Coaching career ==
Ryan served on his father's staff at Wisconsin as director of basketball operations and video coordinator from 2002 to 2007. He was head coach of the Wisconsin Swing AAU club in 2005. He was an assistant at North Dakota State under Saul Phillips from 2007 to 2014. Ryan helped the team reach the NCAA tournament twice, and in his final season the Bison won a school-record 26 games and defeated Oklahoma. Ryan followed Phillips to Ohio in 2014, serving as an assistant until 2019. He helped the Bobcats finish 81–77 in five seasons and reach the semifinals of the College Basketball Invitational in 2016.

In May 2019, Wheeling University coach John Peckinpaugh resigned. Ryan was hired to replace him as the head coach of the Cardinals on July 2. He had only five players on the roster and had to build the team from scratch. In his only season, despite being picked to finish last in the Mountain East Conference, he guided the team to a 14–13 record and fifth in the conference.

On June 6, 2020, Ryan agreed to terms to become the new head coach at Green Bay. He replaced Linc Darner who was fired after leading the Phoenix to a 17–16 record in 2019–20. In his first season, Ryan guided the team to a 8–17 record. On January 31, 2023, Ryan was fired after starting the season 2–19. Assistant coach Freddie Owens was named interim head coach for the rest of the season.

On May 5, 2025, Ryan was hired as an assistant coach for Southern Utah.

== Personal life ==
Ryan is the son of former Wisconsin coach and College Basketball Hall of Fame inductee William Francis "Bo" Ryan Jr. His wife Emily is a native of the Fox Valley. Together, they have three children: Owen, Liam and Callen.

== Head coaching record ==
Record table
Season	Team	Overall	Conference	Standing	Postseason
Wheeling Cardinals (Mountain East Conference) (2019–2020)
2019–20	Wheeling	14–13	11–11	5th	
Wheeling:		14–13 (.519)	11–11 (.500)		
Green Bay Phoenix (Horizon League) (2020–2023)
2020–21	Green Bay	8–17	8–12	7th	
2021–22	Green Bay	5–25	4–16	11th	
2022–23	Green Bay	2–19	1–9		
Green Bay:		15–61 (.197)	13–37 (.260)		
Total:		29–74 (.282)			
