= Freddie Owens =

American men's basketball coach (born 1981)

Freddie Owens (born October 31, 1981) is an American men's basketball coach, who was the interim head coach for the Green Bay Phoenix. During his nine years as a coach, he has been a part of four championships and NCAA teams at the University of Montana (2010, 2012 and 2013) and the College of the Holy Cross (2016).

== Playing career ==
During his collegiate career as a student-athlete at the University of Wisconsin, the Badgers won three Big Ten championships. In the 2001-02 season, Wisconsin shared the Big Ten regular season title while finishing with a 19-13 overall record and appearing in the second round of the NCAA tournament. The 2002-03 season concluded with Wisconsin winning back to back regular season Big Ten titles while finishing 24-8 overall and making an appearance in the NCAA "Sweet Sixteen" on a game winning 3 pointer made by Owens. In the 2003-04 season, Wisconsin finished the season with a 25-7 overall while winning the Big Ten tournament championship and making an appearance in the NCAA second round.

== Collegiate coaching history ==
=== College of the Holy Cross ===
During 2015-16 season, Owens' first season of staff, Holy Cross won the Patriot League Tournament championship after finishing 9th in the regular season conference standings. Entering the Patriot League tournament as the 9th seed, Holy Cross went on the win four straight road games over 8th seeded Loyola (MD), 1 seeded Bucknell, 4th seeded Army and 2nd seeded Lehigh. Holy Cross was the lowest seed to ever win the Patriot League tournament.

=== University of Montana ===
While at Montana, Owens helped the Grizzlies to two regular season Big Sky championships and three Big Sky tournament championships while appearing in three NCAA tournaments. Montana compiled an impressive 93-35 overall record in his four years on staff. The 2011-12 season saw Montana finish with a 15-1 league record and a Big Sky regular and tournament championship. In the 2012-13 season, Montana finished with a 19-1 Big Sky Conference record while winning back to back regular season and tournament championships. While on staff, Montana averaged 23 wins per season from 2009-2013 and made four straight post season appearances.

== Head coaching record ==
Record table
Season	Team	Overall	Conference	Standing	Postseason
Green Bay Phoenix (Horizon League) (2023)
2022–23	Green Bay	1–10	1–9	T–10th	
Green Bay:		1–10 (.091)	1–9 (.100)		
Total:		1–10 (.091)			
