= Kress Events Center =

Multipurpose athletic facility in Green Bay, Wisconsin, U.S.

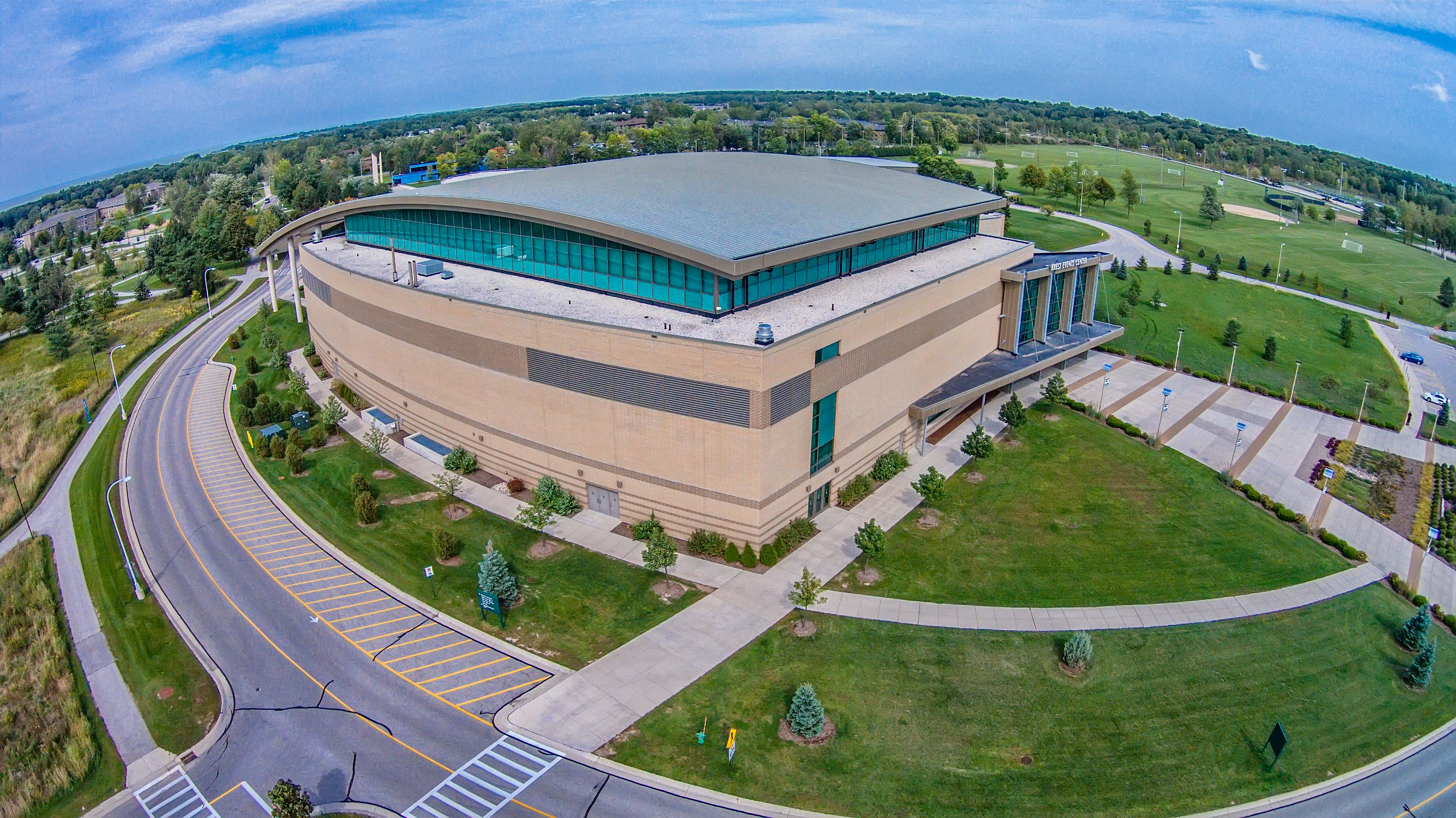
- Interactive map of Kress Events Center
- Location: Green Bay, Wisconsin, U.S.
- Coordinates: 44.530069°N 87.915967°W
- Owner: University of Wisconsin-Green Bay
- Capacity: 4,000

Construction
- Opened: November 2, 2007
- Cost: $33 million ($80.6 million in 2025 dollars)
- Architect: Venture Architects
- General contractor: Miron Construction

Tenants
- Green Bay Phoenix women's basketball (2007–present); UW-Green Bay Phoenix volleyball (2007–present)

The Kress Events Center, also known as the KEC or the Kress, is a multipurpose athletic facility located in Green Bay, Wisconsin, United States, on the University of Wisconsin–Green Bay campus. The facility's main gym (Kress Events Center Arena) hosts the UW-Green Bay women's basketball and volleyball teams. Other facilities onsite include a fitness center shared by athletes and the student body, athletic training facilities, and the administrative offices of UW-Green Bay's athletics program.

== History ==
UW-Green Bay sought funding to renovate its aging athletic facility, the Phoenix Sports Center (built in 1975), as early as 2003. The school received $7.5 million in funding from the state, and expected an equal amount of private donations to fund the renovation. The remainder of the money was to be raised through an increase in student segregated fees, which pay for student life and other recreational activities. As of 2017, students were still paying off the facility through their segregated fees. After receiving a large donation from the George F. Kress Foundation, the school was able to begin construction, the new facility bearing Kress' name. Officially announced on December 29, 2004, construction began November 2, 2005 and the facility opened two years later that same month. The first event hosted in the new building was a volleyball match against UW-Milwaukee. UW-Green Bay holds its spring graduation ceremony at the Kress Events Center, and three out of the four area high schools (Green Bay East, West and Southwest) hold their graduation ceremonies at the KEC. In 2007, the KEC hosted a joint concert featuring Christian rock groups Switchfoot and Relient K. UW-Green Bay's student programming group had booked pop singer Kesha for a concert at the KEC in spring 2014, but the event was ultimately cancelled. The KEC has also played host to political rallies during campaign seasons, including Barack Obama in 2008 and Bernie Sanders in 2016.

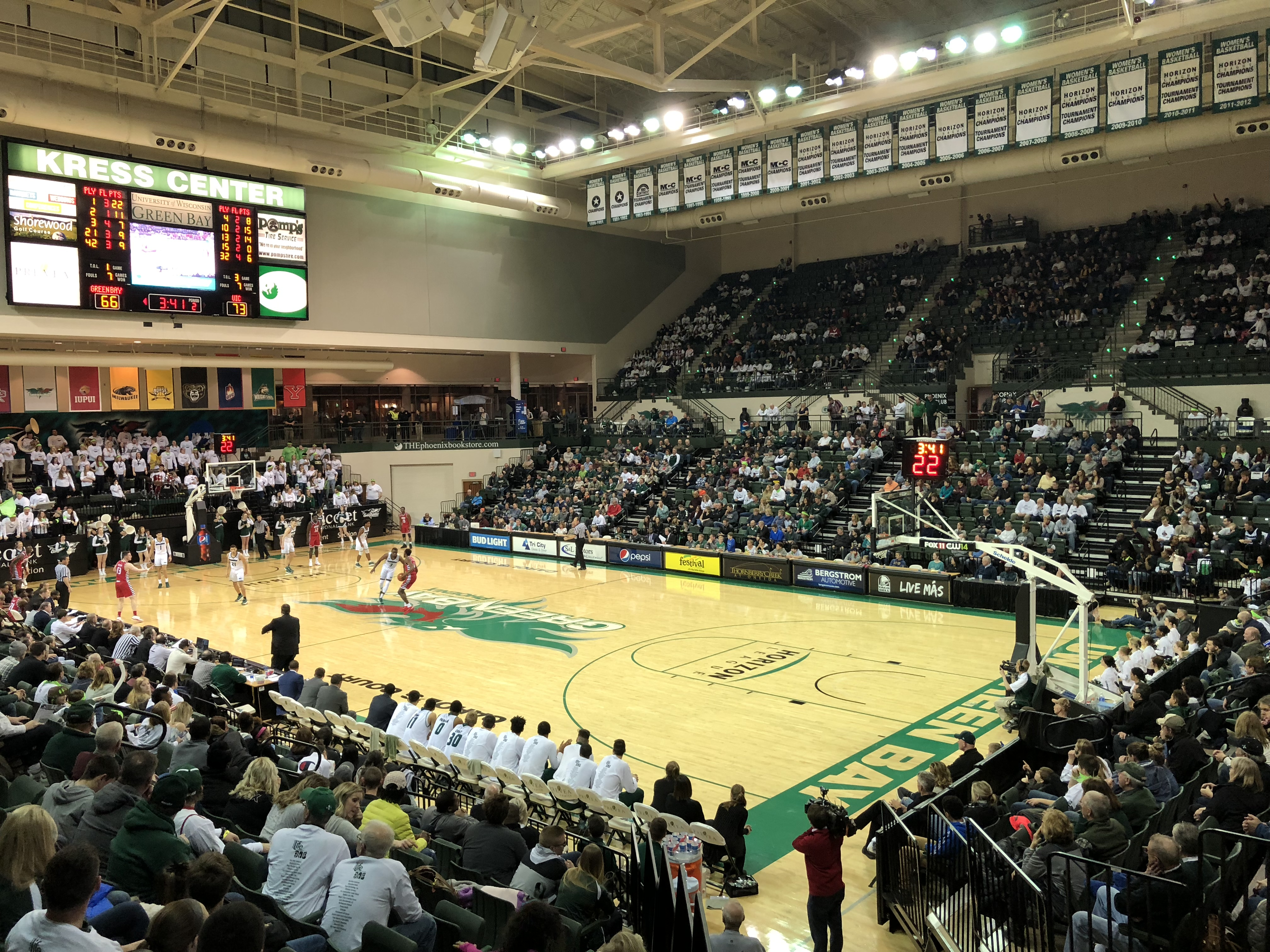
The Kress Events Center has hosted multiple regular season UW-Green Bay men's basketball games since February 2018.

== Facilities ==
=== Phoenix Sports Center ===
The KEC was built around the existing Phoenix Sports Center and retains a number of its original facilities, including:

- Two full-size gyms (old East and West Gyms), typically used for intramural basketball or volleyball
- Some older athletic training facilities, and the swimming, softball, and Nordic skiing team rooms
- The Peter F. Dorschel Natorium, a swimming and diving facility
- Racquetball courts

=== Facilities added with KEC expansion ===
- Kress Events Center Arena, a 4,018-seat gym and the facility's main event venue
- Men's and women's soccer team rooms, basketball team rooms
- Dick Bennett Gym, named for the coach who brought success to UW-Green Bay's basketball team in the 1990s. Mainly used as a practice gym for the basketball teams, the gym is open to students when not in use by athletics.
- A two-level fitness center used by both athletes and students
- An indoor turf gym
- A studio used for fitness classes
- Administrative offices for UW-Green Bay Athletics

== See also ==
- List of NCAA Division I basketball arenas
