= 2024–25 Missouri Valley Conference men's basketball season =

- League: NCAA Division I
- Sport: Basketball
- Teams: 12
- TV partner(s): CBS, CBSSN, Gray Media, MC22

Regular Season
- Regular season champions: Drake
- Season MVP: Bennett Stirtz

MVC Tournament
- Champions: Drake
- Runners-up: Bradley

Basketball seasons
- ← 2023–24 2025–26 →

2024–25 Missouri Valley Conference men's basketball standings
	Conf.				Overall
Team	W		L	PCT	W		L	PCT
Drake †	17	–	3	.850	31	–	4	.886
Bradley	15	–	5	.750	28	–	9	.757
Northern Iowa	14	–	6	.700	20	–	13	.606
Belmont	13	–	7	.650	22	–	11	.667
Illinois State	10	–	10	.500	22	–	14	.611
UIC	10	–	10	.500	17	–	14	.548
Murray State	9	–	11	.450	16	–	17	.485
Southern Illinois	8	–	12	.400	14	–	19	.424
Indiana State	8	–	12	.400	14	–	18	.438
Evansville	8	–	12	.400	11	–	21	.344
Valparaiso	6	–	14	.300	15	–	19	.441
Missouri State	2	–	18	.100	9	–	23	.281
† 2025 MVC tournament winner

The 2024–25 Missouri Valley Conference men's basketball season began with practices in October 2024, followed by the start of the 2024–25 NCAA Division I men's basketball season in November. Conference play began in December 2024 and ended in March 2025.

With a win over Evansville on February 26, 2025, Drake clinched the regular season championship for the third consecutive season.

The MVC tournament was held March 6 through March 9, 2025 at the Enterprise Center in St. Louis, Missouri. Drake won the tournament championship for the third consecutive year, defeating Bradley in the championship game.

Drake point guard Bennett Stirtz was named the conference's player of the year. Drake's head coach Ben McCollum was named conference coach of the year.

The season was the final season for Missouri State in the conference, as they joined Conference USA on July 1, 2025.

== Head coaches ==
=== Coaches ===
Team	Head coach	Previous job	Year at school	Overall record	MVC record	MVC championships	NCAA Tournaments
Belmont	Casey Alexander	Lipscomb	6	140-54	39-21	0	0
Bradley	Brian Wardle	Green Bay	10	181-145	97-85	2	1
Drake	Ben McCollum	Northwest Missouri State	1	31-4	17-3	1	1
Evansville	David Ragland	Butler (asst.)	3	33-66	15-45	0	0
Illinois State	Ryan Pedon	Ohio State (asst.)	3	48-52	25-35	0	0
Indiana State	Matthew Graves	Indiana State (asso. HC)	1	14-18	8-12	0	0
Missouri State	Cuonzo Martin	Missouri	4*	70-64	28-46	0	0
Murray State	Steve Prohm	Iowa State	7*	149-81	29–31	0	1
Northern Iowa	Ben Jacobson	Northern Iowa (asst.)	19	374-246	209-139	4	4
Southern Illinois	Scott Nagy	Wright State	1	14-19	8-12	0	0
UIC	Rob Ehsan	Stanford (asst.)	1	17-14	10-10	0	0
Valparaiso	Roger Powell Jr.	Gonzaga (asst.)	2	22-44	9-31	0	0

Notes:

- All records, appearances, titles, etc. are from time with current school only.
- Year at school includes the 2024–25 season.
- Overall and MVC records are from time at current school and are through the end of the 2024-25 season.
- Steve Prohm previously held the head coaching position at Murray State from 2011-2015, when the Racers were part of the Ohio Valley Conference. The overall win totals and tournament appearances from this time are included, but not conference wins/losses.
- Cuonzo Martin previously held the head coaching position at Missouri State from 2008-2011, where the Bears captured a MVC regular-season championship in the 2010-11 season.

== Preseason ==
=== Preseason poll ===
The preseason awards and coaches' poll were released by the league office on October 2, 2024.

Rank	Team
1.	Bradley (46)
2.	Northern Iowa (2)
3.	Murray State (1)
4.	Illinois State
5.	Drake
6.	Belmont
7.	Southern Illinois
8.	Indiana State
9.	Evansville
10.	Valparaiso
11.	Missouri State
12.	UIC
(first place votes)

=== Preseason All-Missouri Valley teams ===
Honor	Recipient
Preseason Player of the Year	Duke Deen, Bradley
Preseason All-MVC First Team	Duke Deen, Bradley
Preseason All-MVC First Team	Tytan Anderson, Northern Iowa
Preseason All-MVC First Team	Darius Hannah, Bradley
Preseason All-MVC First Team	Johnny Kinziger, Illinois State
Preseason All-MVC First Team	Cooper Schwieger, Valparaiso
Preseason All-MVC First Team	JaCobi Wood, Murray State
Preseason All-MVC Second Team	Trey Campbell, Northern Iowa
Preseason All-MVC Second Team	Nick Ellington, Murray State
Preseason All-MVC Second Team	Jacob Hutson, Northern Iowa
Preseason All-MVC Second Team	Zek Montgomery, Bradley
Preseason All-MVC Second Team	Malachi Poindexter, Illinois State
Preseason All-MVC Third Team	Kennard Davis Jr., Southern Illinois
Preseason All-MVC Third Team	Ali Dibba, Southern Illinois
Preseason All-MVC Third Team	Cam Manyawu, Drake
Preseason All-MVC Third Team	Filip Skobalj, UIC
Preseason All-MVC Third Team	Bennett Stirtz, Drake

== Regular season ==
=== Conference matrix ===
This table summarizes the head-to-head results between teams in conference play, including postseason tournament games.

	Belmont	Bradley	Drake	Evansville	Illinois State	Indiana State	Murray State	Missouri State	Northern Iowa	Southern Illinois	UIC	Valpo
vs BU	–	1-1	2-0	1-1	1-2	0-2	0-2	0-2	2-0	0-2	0-1	1-1
vs BR	1-1	–	2-1	0-1	1-1	0-2	0-3	0-1	1-1	0-2	1-1	0-3
vs DU	0-2	1-2	–	0-2	0-2	0-2	1-1	0-2	0-2	0-2	1-1	0-2
vs UE	1-1	1-0	2-0	–	1-1	1-1	2-1	1-1	1-0	1-1	2-0	0-2
vs IlSU	2-1	1-1	2-0	1-1	–	1-1	0-1	0-3	2-0	1-1	1-1	0-1
vs InSU	2-0	2-0	2-0	1-1	1-1	–	1-1	0-2	2-0	1-1	0-1	1-1
vs MrSU	2-0	3-0	1-1	1-2	1-0	1-1	–	1-0	1-1	0-2	1-1	0-2
vs MoSU	2-0	1-0	2-0	1-1	3-0	2-0	0-1	–	2-0	2-0	2-0	2-0
vs UNI	0-2	1-1	2-0	0-1	0-2	0-2	1-1	0-2	–	1-1	0-2	2-0
vs SIU	2-0	2-0	2-0	1-1	1-1	1-1	2-0	0-2	1-1	–	0-2	1-1
vs UIC	1-0	1-1	1-1	0-2	1-1	1-0	1-1	0-2	2-0	2-0	–	1-2
vs VU	1-1	3-0	2-0	2-0	1-0	1-1	2-0	0-2	0-2	1-1	2-1	–
Total	14-8	17-6	20-3	8-13	11-11	8-13	10-12	2-19	14-7	9-13	10-11	8-15

=== Player of the week ===
Every Monday, throughout the season, the Missouri Valley Conference named a player of the week and a newcomer of the week.

Date	Player of the week	Newcomer of the week
November 12, 2024	Javon Jackson, UIC	Samage Teel, Indiana State
November 18, 2024	KyeRon Lindsay, Murray State	Vincent Brady II, Missouri State
November 26, 2024	Bennett Stirtz, Drake	Mitch Mascari, Drake
December 2, 2024	Duke Deen, Bradley	Dez White, Missouri State
December 16, 2024	Chase Walker, Illinois State	Jonathan Pierre, Belmont
December 23, 2024	Leon Bond III, Northern Iowa	Samage Teel (2), Indiana State
December 30, 2024	Tytan Anderson, Northern Iowa	Saša Ciani, UIC
January 6, 2025	Tayshawn Comer, Evansville	Jonathan Pierre (2), Belmont
January 13, 2025	Trey Campbell, UNI	Carter Whitt, Belmont
January 20, 2025	Kennard Davis Jr., Southern Illinois	Javon Jackson, UIC
January 27, 2025	Bennett Stirtz (2), Drake	Carter Whitt (2), Belmont
February 3, 2025	Chase Walker (2), Illinois State	Bennett Stirtz, Drake
February 10, 2025	Tyler Lundblade, Belmont	Bennett Stirtz (2), Drake
February 17, 2025	Duke Deen (2), Bradley	Samage Teel (3), Indiana State
February 24, 2025	Bennett Stirtz (3), Drake	Tayshawn Comer, Evansville
March 3, 2025	Cooper Schwieger, Valparaiso	Tyler Lundblade, Belmont

== Honors and awards ==
=== All-Conference awards and teams ===
The MVC announced its all-conference teams and major honors on March 5, 2025.

Honor	Recipient
Larry Bird Player of the Year	Bennett Stirtz, Drake
Coach of the Year	Ben McCollum, Drake
Defensive MVP	Connor Turnbull, Evansville
Sixth Man of the Year	Tavion Banks, Drake
Newcomer of the Year	Bennett Stirtz, Drake
Freshman of the Year	All Wright, Valparaiso
First Team
First Team	Bennett Stirtz, Drake
First Team	Jonathan Pierre, Belmont
First Team	Duke Deen, Bradley
First Team	Chase Walker, Illinois State
First Team	Samage Teel, Indiana State
First Team	Tytan Anderson, Northern Iowa
Second Team
Second Team	Tayshawn Comer, Evansville
Second Team	Kennard Davis Jr., Southern Illinois
Second Team	Darius Hannah, Bradley
Second Team	Johnny Kinziger, Illinois State
Second Team	Cooper Schwieger, Valparaiso
Third Team
Third Team	Trey Campbell, UNI
Third Team	Ali Dibba, Southern Illinois
Third Team	Mitch Mascari, Drake
Third Team	Zek Montgomery, Bradley
Third Team	Carter Whitt, Belmont

== Postseason ==
=== MVC Tournament ===
Opening Round; Thursday, March 6 MVC TV Network/ESPN+
8	Southern Illinois	86
9	Indiana State	85
5	Illinois State	70
12	Missouri State	54
7	Murray State	74
10	Evansville	53
6	UIC	50
11	Valparaiso	67

Quarterfinals; Friday, March 7 MVC TV Network/ESPN+
1	Drake	70
8	Southern Illinois	53
4	Belmont	76
5	Illinois State	63
2	Bradley	70
7	Murray State	62
3	Northern Iowa	63
11	Valparaiso	64

Semifinals; Saturday, March 8 CBSSN
1	Drake	57
4	Belmont	50
2	Bradley	70
11	Valparaiso	65

Final; Sunday, March 9 CBS
1	Drake	63
2	Bradley	48

=== NCAA Tournament ===
The winner of the MVC tournament, Drake, received the conference's automatic bid to the NCAA Tournament. No other team received a bid to the tournament.

Seed	Region	School	Round of 64	Round of 32	Sweet Sixteen	Elite Eight	Final Four	Championship
11	West	Drake	defeated (6) Missouri 67–57	eliminated by (3) Texas Tech 64–77	-	-	-	-
		W–L (%):	1–0 (1.000)	0–1 (.000)	0–0 (–)	0–0 (–)	0–0 (–)	Total: 1–1 (.500)

=== National Invitation Tournament ===
Bradley, having come within one win of the conference's automatic bid to the NCAA tournament, received an exempt bid to the 2025 NIT as the No. 3 seed in the Dayton region. Northern Iowa also received an at-large bid and were placed in the Dallas region to face off against SMU, the top-seeded team in the region.

School	First round	Second Round	Quarterfinal	Semifinal	Championship
Northern Iowa	lost to (1) SMU 63-73	-	-	-	-
Bradley	defeated North Alabama 71-62	defeated (2) George Mason 75-67	lost to Chattanooga 67-65	-	-
W–L (%):	1–1 (.500)	1–0 (1.000)	0–1 (.000)	0–0 (–)	0–0 (–) Total: 2–2 (.500)

=== College Basketball Invitational ===
Illinois State received an invite to the 2025 CBI tournament as the top overall seed, based on a variety of metrics including KenPom rating. There, they would go undefeated to claim their first NCAA Division I postseason title.

Seed	School	First round	Quarterfinals	Semifinals	Championship
1	Illinois State	defeated Presbyterian 78-70	Bye	defeated Incarnate Word 78-73	defeated Cleveland State 79-68
W–L (%):	3–0 (1.000)	1–0 (1.000)	0–0 (–)	1–0 (1.000)	1–0 (1.000) Total: 3–0 (1.000)
