= 2024–25 Valparaiso Beacons men's basketball team =

American college basketball season

2024–25 Valparaiso Beacons men's basketball
- Conference: Missouri Valley Conference
- Record: 15–19 (6–14 MVC)
- Head coach: Roger Powell Jr. (2nd season)
- Assistant coaches: Pat Baldwin; Matt Gordon; A. J. Moye
- Home arena: Athletics–Recreation Center

2024–25 Missouri Valley Conference men's basketball standings
	Conf.				Overall
Team	W		L	PCT	W		L	PCT
Drake †	17	–	3	.850	31	–	4	.886
Bradley	15	–	5	.750	28	–	9	.757
Northern Iowa	14	–	6	.700	20	–	13	.606
Belmont	13	–	7	.650	22	–	11	.667
Illinois State	10	–	10	.500	22	–	14	.611
UIC	10	–	10	.500	17	–	14	.548
Murray State	9	–	11	.450	16	–	17	.485
Southern Illinois	8	–	12	.400	14	–	19	.424
Indiana State	8	–	12	.400	14	–	18	.438
Evansville	8	–	12	.400	11	–	21	.344
Valparaiso	6	–	14	.300	15	–	19	.441
Missouri State	2	–	18	.100	9	–	23	.281
† 2025 MVC tournament winner

The 2024–25 Valparaiso Beacons men's basketball team represented Valparaiso University during the 2024–25 NCAA Division I men's basketball season. The Beacons, led by second-year head coach Roger Powell Jr., played their home games at the Athletics–Recreation Center in Valparaiso, Indiana as members of the Missouri Valley Conference (MVC). They finished 13–19 in the regular season and 6–14 in conference play to finish in 11th place. In the MVC tournament, the Beacons defeated UIC in the first round and Northern Iowa in the quarterfinals before falling to Bradley in the semifinals.

== Previous season ==
The Beacons finished the 2023–24 season 7–24, 3–17 in MVC play, to finish in last place. They were defeated by Belmont in the opening round of the MVC tournament.

== Roster ==
2024–25 Valparaiso Beacons men's basketball team
Players
Coaches

Pos.	#	Name	Height	Weight	Year	Previous school	Hometown
G	1	Justus McNair	6 ft 3 in (1.91 m)	195 lb (88 kg)	Fr	Joliet West HS	Joliet, IL
G	2	Jefferson De La Cruz Monegro	6 ft 3 in (1.91 m)	205 lb (93 kg)	Jr	Western Michigan	LaSalle, QC
G	3	All Wright	6 ft 3 in (1.91 m)	180 lb (82 kg)	Fr	Link Year Prep	Durango, Mexico
G	5	Ramzi Salem	6 ft 3 in (1.91 m)	180 lb (82 kg)	Fr	John Burroughs School	St. Louis, MO
G	6	Darius DeAveiro	6 ft 1 in (1.85 m)	180 lb (82 kg)	Sr	Orangeville Prep	Kanata, ON
G	9	Isaiah Stafford	6 ft 2 in (1.88 m)	175 lb (79 kg)	Sr	John A. Logan	Bolingbrook, IL
F	10	Lucas Scroggins	6 ft 9 in (2.06 m)	215 lb (98 kg)	RS Fr	Bosco Institute	Woodbridge, VA
F	11	Devon Ellis	6 ft 7 in (2.01 m)	225 lb (102 kg)	Jr	Maryland Eastern Shore	Schaumburg, IL
F	12	Jayden Watson	6 ft 7 in (2.01 m)	205 lb (93 kg)	Fr	Bosco Institute	Chicago Heights, IL
F	13	Cooper Schwieger	6 ft 10 in (2.08 m)	230 lb (104 kg)	So	Link Year Prep	Overland Park, KS
G	20	Joe Vick (W)	6 ft 3 in (1.91 m)	200 lb (91 kg)	Jr	Kouts HS	Kouts, IN
F	21	Kaspar Sepp	6 ft 7 in (2.01 m)	220 lb (100 kg)	So	Fairmont Academy	Tartu, Estonia
F	22	Carson Schwieger	6 ft 8 in (2.03 m)	230 lb (104 kg)	RS Fr	Wright State	Overland Park, KS
G	23	Tyler Schmidt (5Y)	6 ft 4 in (1.93 m)	200 lb (91 kg)	Sr	Olivet Nazarene	Valparaiso, IN
G	24	Isaiah Shaw	6 ft 8 in (2.03 m)	210 lb (95 kg)	RS So	Grand Canyon	Phoenix, AZ
G	32	Nick Lombardi	6 ft 0 in (1.83 m)	200 lb (91 kg)	Fr	Montini Catholic HS	Lisle, IL
F	44	Louth-M Coulibaly	6 ft 9 in (2.06 m)	240 lb (109 kg)	RS Jr	Holy Cross	Ottawa, ON

Head coach

- Roger Powell Jr. (Illinois)

Assistant coach(es)

- Pat Baldwin (Northwestern)
- Matt Gordon (Illinois State)
- A. J. Moye (Indiana)

Legend

- (C) Team captain
- (S) Suspended
- (I) Ineligible
- (W) Walk-on
- (5Y) Fifth-year senior
- Injured
- Current redshirt

Roster
Last update: November 25, 2024

== Schedule and results ==
Date time, TV	Rank^{#}	Opponent^{#}	Result	Record	Site (attendance) city, state
Exhibition season
October 30, 2024*; 7:00 p.m.		Saint Mary-of-the-Woods	W 93–65		Athletics–Recreation Center; Valparaiso, IN
Regular season
November 4, 2024*; 4:00 p.m., Gray Media/ TotalAthleteTipoff.com		vs. Liberty; Athletes In Action; Total Athlete Tip-Off	L 63–83	0–1	John Wooden; Family Fieldhouse (1,200); Xenia, OH
November 8, 2024*; 7:00 p.m., ESPN+		Concordia Ann Arbor	W 111–46	1–1	Athletics–Recreation Center (1,549); Valparaiso, IN
November 12, 2024*; 7:00 p.m., ESPN+		Cleveland State	L 67–75	1–2	Athletics–Recreation Center (1,354); Valparaiso, IN
November 21, 2024*; 7:00 p.m., ESPN+		Lindenwood	W 77–64	2–2	Athletics–Recreation Center (1,249); Valparaiso, IN
November 24, 2024*; 1:00 p.m., ESPN+		Eastern Illinois; DePaul Classic MTE	W 81–53	3–2	Athletics–Recreation Center (1,354); Valparaiso, IN
November 27, 2024*; 3:00 p.m., ESPN+		Northern Illinois; DePaul Classic MTE	W 87–82	4–2	Athletics–Recreation Center (1,428); Valparaiso, IN
November 29, 2024*; 12:30 p.m., FS1		at DePaul; DePaul Classic MTE	L 70–89	4–3	Wintrust Arena (3,366); Chicago, IL
December 5, 2024; 7:00 p.m., ESPN+		Drake	L 60–66	4–4 (0–1)	Athletics–Recreation Center (1,488); Valparaiso, IN
December 14, 2024*; 3:00 p.m., ESPN+		Central Michigan	W 93–77	5–4	Athletics–Recreation Center (1,824); Valparaiso, IN
December 17, 2024*; 7:00 p.m., Peacock		at Ohio State	L 73–95	5–5	Value City Arena (8,079); Columbus, OH
December 20, 2024*; 12:00 p.m., ESPN+		at Western Michigan	W 76–73	6–5	University Arena (1,234); Kalamazoo, MI
December 22, 2024*; 1:00 p.m., ESPN+		Calumet	W 107–57	7–5	Athletics–Recreation Center (1,050); Valparaiso, IN
December 29, 2024; 3:00 p.m., ESPN+		at Bradley	L 75–81 ^{2OT}	7–6 (0–2)	Carver Arena (6,201); Peoria, IL
January 1, 2025; 7:00 p.m., ESPN+		at Missouri State	W 73–72	8–6 (1–2)	Great Southern Bank Arena (2,013); Springfield, MO
January 4, 2025; 3:00 p.m., ESPN+		Northern Iowa	W 80–73	9–6 (2–2)	Athletics–Recreation Center (1,917); Valparaiso, IN
January 8, 2025; 7:00 p.m., ESPN+		Indiana State	W 98–95	10–6 (3–2)	Athletics–Recreation Center (1,471); Valparaiso, IN
January 11, 2025; 3:00 p.m., ESPN+		at Murray State	L 47–58	10–7 (3–3)	CFSB Center (5,418); Murray, KY
January 14, 2025; 6:30 p.m., ESPN+		at Belmont	L 64–71	10–8 (3–4)	Curb Event Center (1,336); Nashville, TN
January 18, 2025; 1:00 p.m., ESPN+		UIC	L 74–81	10–9 (3–5)	Athletics–Recreation Center (1,456); Valparaiso, IN
January 22, 2025; 6:30 p.m., ESPN+		at Drake	L 71–81	10–10 (3–6)	Knapp Center (3,367); Des Moines, IA
January 25, 2025; 3:00 p.m., ESPN+		Evansville	L 68–78	10–11 (3–7)	Athletics–Recreation Center (1,361); Valparaiso, IN
January 28, 2025; 7:00 p.m., ESPN+		Southern Illinois	L 75–79	10–12 (3–8)	Athletics–Recreation Center (1,113); Valparaiso, IN
February 1, 2025; 4:00 p.m., ESPN+		at Illinois State	L 78–86	10–13 (3–9)	CEFCU Arena (5,706); Normal, IL
February 5, 2025; 6:00 p.m., ESPN+		at Indiana State	L 62–80	10–14 (3–10)	Hulman Center (4,152); Terre Haute, IN
February 8, 2025; 3:00 p.m., ESPN+		Murray State	L 56–74	10–15 (3–11)	Athletics–Recreation Center (1,401); Valparaiso, IN
February 12, 2025; 7:00 p.m., ESPN+		Belmont	W 101–86	11–15 (4–11)	Athletics–Recreation Center (755); Valparaiso, IN
February 16, 2025; 7:00 p.m., ESPN+		at Evansville	L 69–79	11–16 (4–12)	Ford Center (4,736); Evansville, IN
February 19, 2025; 7:00 p.m., ESPN+		Missouri State	W 66–64	12–16 (5–12)	Athletics–Recreation Center (1,267); Valparaiso, IN
February 22, 2025; 6:00 p.m., ESPN+		at Southern Illinois	W 83–79	13–16 (6–12)	Banterra Center (4,203); Carbondale, IL
February 26, 2025; 8:00 p.m., Gray Media/ESPN+		Bradley	L 65–76	13–17 (6–13)	Athletics–Recreation Center (1,583); Valparaiso, IN
March 2, 2025; 2:00 p.m., ESPN+		at UIC	L 73–77	13–18 (6–14)	Credit Union 1 Arena (1,200); Chicago, IL
MVC tournament
March 6, 2025; 8:30 p.m., Gray Media/ESPN+	(11)	vs. (6) UIC; Opening round	W 67–50	14–18	Enterprise Center (3,849); St. Louis, MO
March 7, 2025; 8:30 p.m., Gray Media/ESPN+	(11)	vs. (3) Northern Iowa; Quarterfinal	W 64–63	15–18	Enterprise Center (6,090); St. Louis, MO
March 8, 2025; 5:00 p.m., CBSSN	(11)	vs. (2) Bradley; Semifinal	L 65–70	15–19	Enterprise Center (7,779); St. Louis, MO
*Non-conference game. ^{#}Rankings from AP poll. (#) Tournament seedings in parentheses. All times are in Central.
