= 2024–25 Drake Bulldogs men's basketball team =

American college basketball season

2024–25 Drake Bulldogs men's basketball

MVC regular season & tournament champions Charleston Classic champions

NCAA tournament, Second Round
- Conference: Missouri Valley Conference
- Record: 31–4 (17–3 MVC)
- Head coach: Ben McCollum (1st season)
- Assistant coaches: Josh Sash; Bryston Williams; Connor Wheeler; Jesse Shaw; Xavier Kurth
- Home arena: Knapp Center

2024–25 Missouri Valley Conference men's basketball standings
	Conf.				Overall
Team	W		L	PCT	W		L	PCT
Drake †	17	–	3	.850	31	–	4	.886
Bradley	15	–	5	.750	28	–	9	.757
Northern Iowa	14	–	6	.700	20	–	13	.606
Belmont	13	–	7	.650	22	–	11	.667
Illinois State	10	–	10	.500	22	–	14	.611
UIC	10	–	10	.500	17	–	14	.548
Murray State	9	–	11	.450	16	–	17	.485
Southern Illinois	8	–	12	.400	14	–	19	.424
Indiana State	8	–	12	.400	14	–	18	.438
Evansville	8	–	12	.400	11	–	21	.344
Valparaiso	6	–	14	.300	15	–	19	.441
Missouri State	2	–	18	.100	9	–	23	.281
† 2025 MVC tournament winner

The 2024–25 Drake Bulldogs men's basketball team represented Drake University in the 2024–25 NCAA Division I men's basketball season. The Bulldogs, led by Ben McCollum in his only season as head coach, played their home games at the Knapp Center in Des Moines, Iowa as members of the Missouri Valley Conference (MVC). They finished the regular season 27–3, 17–3 in MVC play to win the school's first outright conference title since the 2007–08 season. In the MVC tournament, the seed and defeated Southern Illinois, Belmont, and Bradley to win the tournament championship. As a result, they received the conference's automatic bid to the NCAA tournament, their third straight appearance. There the defeated Missouri in the First Round marking the school's first NCAA tournament win since 1971. In the second round, they lost to Texas Tech.

On March 24, 2025, head coach Ben McCollum left the team to take the head coach position at Iowa. On March 28, the school named South Dakota State head coach Eric Henderson the team's new head coach.

== Previous season ==
The Bulldogs finished the 2023–24 season 28–7, 16–4 in MVC play to finish in second place. In the MVC tournament, they defeated Evansville, Bradley, and Indiana State to win the tournament championship. As a result, they received the conference's automatic bid to the NCAA tournament as the No. 10 seed in the West region, where they narrowly lost to Washington State in the first round.

On March 24, 2024, it was announced that head coach Darian DeVries was leaving the school to take the head coaching job at West Virginia. Subsequently, most of the roster entered the transfer portal. On April 1, the school named Division II Northwest Missouri State head coach Ben McCollum as the team's new head coach.

== Offseason ==
=== Departures ===
Name	Number	Pos.	Height	Weight	Year	Hometown	Reason for departure
Kyron Gibson	0	G	6'1"	198	Sr	Alexandria, LA	Graduated
Kevin Overton	1	G	6'5"	180	Fr	Oklahoma City, OK	Transferred to Texas Tech
Brashon Hall	2	G	6'1"	185	RS So	Roswell, GA	Transferred to Fairleigh Dickinson
Colby Garland	3	G	6'1"	183	Fr	Magnolia, AR	Transferred to Longwood
Conor Enright	4	G	6'0"	180	RS So	Mundelein, IL	Transferred to DePaul
Patrick Bath	9	F	6'9"	210	Fr	Plymouth, MN	Transferred to North Dakota State
Atin Wright	10	G	6'1"	185	Jr	Hawthorne, CA	Transferred to North Texas
Bennett Fried	11	F	6'7"	170	Fr	La Crosse, WI	Transferred to Augustana (SD)
Tucker DeVries	12	G/F	6'7"	210	Jr	Waukee, IA	Transferred to West Virginia
Carlos Rosario	13	F	6'7"	180	RS So	Santo Domingo, D.R.	Transferred to Oral Roberts
Chico Johnson	20	G	6'3"	180	Fr	Toledo, OH	Transferred to USC Upstate
Elijah Price	22	F	6'9"	195	Fr	Long Beach, CA	Transferred to Fresno State
Ethan Roberts	23	G	6'5"	195	So	Arlington Heights, IL	Transferred to Penn
Eric Northweather	35	F/C	6'10"	225	Jr	Jefferson City, MO	Left Program
Darnell Brodie	51	C	6'10"	275	GS	Newark, NJ	Graduated

=== Incoming transfers ===
Name	Number	Pos.	Height	Weight	Year	Hometown	Previous School
Cam Manyawu	3	F	6'8"	230	So	Kansas City, MO	Transferred from Wyoming
Isaiah Jackson	4	G	6'3"	180	GS	Independence, MO	Transferred from NW Missouri State
Eli Shetlar	10	G	6'6"	190	So	Wichita, KS	Transferred from Indiana State
Kael Combs	11	G	6'4"	190	So	Nixa, MO	Transferred from Wyoming
Bennett Stirtz	14	G	6'4"	180	Jr	Liberty, MO	Transferred from NW Missouri State
Mitch Mascari	22	G	6'5"	200	GS	Geneva, IL	Transferred from NW Missouri State
Daniel Abreu	54	F	6'6"	220	GS	Springfield, MO	Transferred from NW Missouri State

=== 2024 recruiting class ===
College recruiting information
Name	Hometown	School	Height	Weight	Commit date
Isaia Howard; SG	Plattsburg, MO	Plattsburg	6 ft 5 in (1.96 m)	200 lb (91 kg)	May 2, 2024
Isaia Howard; SG	Recruit ratings: 247Sports:				
Joey Matteoni; PF	Overland Park, KS	Blue Valley Northwest	6 ft 8 in (2.03 m)	215 lb (98 kg)	Apr 9, 2024
Joey Matteoni; PF	Recruit ratings: No ratings found				
Tavion Banks; SG	Kansas City, MO	NW Florida State College	6 ft 7 in (2.01 m)	200 lb (91 kg)	May 3, 2024
Tavion Banks; SG	Recruit ratings: No ratings found				
Overall recruit ranking: 247Sports: 156 ESPN: —
Note: In many cases, Scout, Rivals, 247Sports, On3, and ESPN may conflict in their listings of height and weight.; In these cases, the average was taken. ESPN grades are on a 100-point scale.; Sources: "2024 Team Ranking". Rivals.

== Preseason ==
The Bulldogs, as the defending Arch Madness champions, were picked to finish fifth in the conference's preseason poll. Forward Cam Manyawu and guard Bennett Stirtz were selected to the Preseason All-MVC third team.

== Roster ==
2024–25 Drake Bulldogs men's basketball team
Players
Coaches

Pos.	#	Name	Height	Weight	Year	Previous school	Hometown
F	3	Cam Manyawu	6 ft 8 in (2.03 m)	230 lb (104 kg)	So	Wyoming; Staley	Kansas City, MO
G	4	Isaiah Jackson	6 ft 3 in (1.91 m)	180 lb (82 kg)	GS	NW Missouri State; William Chrisman	Independence, MO
G/F	6	Tavion Banks	6 ft 7 in (2.01 m)	200 lb (91 kg)	Jr	NW Florida State	Kansas City, MO
G	10	Eli Shetlar (redshirt)	6 ft 6 in (1.98 m)	190 lb (86 kg)	So	Indiana State; Andover	Wichita, KS
G	11	Kael Combs	6 ft 4 in (1.93 m)	190 lb (86 kg)	So	Wyoming; Nixa	Nixa, MO
G	14	Bennett Stirtz	6 ft 4 in (1.93 m)	180 lb (82 kg)	Jr	NW Missouri State; Liberty	Liberty, MO
G	21	Andrew Alia (injured) (W)	6 ft 2 in (1.88 m)	190 lb (86 kg)	RS So	St. Joseph	Kenosha, WI
G	22	Mitch Mascari	6 ft 5 in (1.96 m)	200 lb (91 kg)	GS	NW Missouri State; Geneva	Geneva, IL
G	23	Isaia Howard	6 ft 5 in (1.96 m)	200 lb (91 kg)	Fr	Plattsburg	Plattsburg, MO
F	24	Nate Ferguson	6 ft 8 in (2.03 m)	220 lb (100 kg)	RS Sr	Lemont	Lemont, IL
F	44	Joey Matteoni (redshirt)	6 ft 8 in (2.03 m)	215 lb (98 kg)	Fr	Blue Valley Northwest	Overland Park, KS
F	54	Daniel Abreu	6 ft 6 in (1.98 m)	220 lb (100 kg)	GS	NW Missouri State; Willard	Springfield, MO

Head coach

- Ben McCollum (Northwest Missouri State)

Assistant coach(es)

- Josh Sash (William Penn)
- Bryston Williams (Northwest Missouri State)
- Connor Wheeler (SIU Edwardsville)

Legend

- (C) Team captain
- (S) Suspended
- (I) Ineligible
- (W) Walk-on
- Injured
- Current redshirt

Roster
Last update: November 14, 2024

== Schedule and results ==
Date time, TV	Rank^{#}	Opponent^{#}	Result	Record	High points	High rebounds	High assists	Site (attendance) city, state
Regular Season
November 4, 2024*; 6:30 pm, ESPN+		York (NE)	W 93–41	1–0	30 – Abreu	12 – Manyawu	7 – Stirtz	Knapp Center (2,514); Des Moines, IA
November 10, 2024*; 1:00 pm, ESPN+		Stephen F. Austin	W 66–51	2–0	26 – Mascari	5 – Manyawu	5 – Jackson	Knapp Center (2,627); Des Moines, IA
November 16, 2024*; 7:00 pm, ESPN+		Florida Gulf Coast	W 63–61	3–0	25 – Stirtz	7 – Stirtz	4 – Stirtz	Knapp Center (2,862); Des Moines, IA
November 21, 2024*; 11:00 am, ESPN2		vs. Miami (FL); Shriners Children's Charleston Classic	W 80–69	4–0	21 – Stirtz	10 – Abreu	6 – Stirtz	TD Arena (1,818); Charleston, SC
November 22, 2024*; 10:30 am, ESPN2		vs. Florida Atlantic; Shriners Children's Charleston Classic	W 75–63	5–0	22 – Mascari	10 – Jackson	6 – Stirtz	TD Arena (1,936); Charleston, SC
November 24, 2024*; 7:30 pm, ESPN		vs. Vanderbilt; Shriners Children's Charleston Classic Final	W 81–70	6–0	18 – Manyawu	11 – Manyawu	11 – Stirtz	TD Arena (2,119); Charleston, SC
November 30, 2024*; 5:00 pm, ESPN+		Georgia Southern	W 61–47	7–0	15 – Abreu	7 – Abreu	6 – Stirtz	Knapp Center (3,061); Des Moines, IA
December 5, 2024; 7:00 pm, ESPN+		at Valparaiso	W 66–60	8–0 (1–0)	29 – Stirtz	10 – Manyawu	4 – Stirtz	Athletics-Recreation Center (1,488); Valparaiso, IN
December 12, 2024*; 7:30 pm, ESPN+		St. Ambrose	W 90–35	9–0	15 – Banks	7 – Manyawu	7 – Stirtz	Knapp Center (4,919); Des Moines, IA
December 17, 2024*; 7:00 pm, ESPN+		vs. Kansas State; Wildcat Classic	W 73–70 ^{OT}	10–0	25 – Mascari	8 – Jackson	8 – Jackson	T-Mobile Center (9,210); Kansas City, MO
December 21, 2024*; 5:00 pm, MC22/ESPN+		Green Bay	W 72–62	11–0	21 – Jackson	12 – Jackson	6 – Stirtz	Knapp Center (3,418); Des Moines, IA
December 29, 2024; 1:00 pm, ESPN+		Belmont	W 65–46	12–0 (2–0)	20 – Stirtz	8 – Jackson	4 – Stirtz	Knapp Center (5,231); Des Moines, IA
January 1, 2025; 2:00 pm, ESPN+		at UIC	L 70–74	12–1 (2–1)	30 – Stirtz	12 – Manyawu	12 – Stirtz	Credit Union 1 Arena (1,200); Chicago, IL
January 5, 2025; 2:00 pm, ESPN2		Murray State	L 59–66	12–2 (2–2)	13 – 2 Tied	6 – Howard	4 – Stirtz	Knapp Center (3,807); Des Moines, IA
January 8, 2025; 6:00 pm, CBSSN		at Bradley	W 64–57	13–2 (3–2)	19 – Banks	7 – Banks	8 – Stirtz	Carver Arena (6,188); Peoria, IL
January 11, 2025; 5:00 pm, MC22/ESPN+		Evansville	W 63–40	14–2 (4–2)	16 – Stirtz	13 – Banks	6 – Stirtz	Knapp Center (3,930); Des Moines, IA
January 15, 2025; 8:00 pm, Gray Media/ESPN+		Illinois State	W 66–62	15–2 (5–2)	23 – Abreu	7 – Manyawu	8 – Stirtz	Knapp Center (3,117); Des Moines, IA
January 18, 2025; 5:00 pm, ESPNU		at Indiana State	W 71–53	16–2 (6–2)	19 – Mascari	6 – Manyawu	9 – Stirtz	Hulman Center (6,013); Terre Haute, IN
January 22, 2025; 6:30 pm, MC22/ESPN+		Valparaiso	W 81–71	17–2 (7–2)	24 – Stirtz	5 – 3 Tied	9 – Stirtz	Knapp Center (3,367); Des Moines, IA
January 25, 2025; 3:00 pm, ESPN+		at Missouri State	W 69–62 ^{OT}	18–2 (8–2)	18 – Stirtz	5 – Mascari	4 – Stirtz	Great Southern Bank Arena (3,210); Springfield, MO
January 29, 2025; 6:00 pm, Gray Media/ESPN+		Northern Iowa; Rivalry	W 66–52	19–2 (9–2)	20 – Stirtz	9 – Manyawu	4 – Stirtz	Knapp Center (5,464); Des Moines, IA
February 1, 2025; 1:00 pm, ESPNU		at Southern Illinois	W 75–65	20–2 (10–2)	30 – Stirtz	5 – Banks	5 – Stirtz	Banterra Center (4,306); Carbondale, IL
February 4, 2025; 6:00 pm, ESPN2		at Murray State	W 55–45	21–2 (11–2)	23 – Stirtz	5 – 2 Tied	4 – Stirtz	CFSB Center (4,586); Murray, KY
February 8, 2025; 5:00 pm, ESPN+		Indiana State	W 85–81 ^{OT}	22–2 (12–2)	20 – Stirtz	8 – Abreu	7 – Stirtz	Knapp Center (4,394); Des Moines, IA
February 12, 2025; 8:00 pm, Gray Media/ESPN+		at Illinois State	W 84–77	23–2 (13–2)	25 – Stirtz	7 – Stirtz	6 – Stirtz	CEFCU Arena (4,122); Normal, IL
February 16, 2025; 1:00 pm, ESPN2		Bradley	L 59–61	23–3 (13–3)	16 – Abreu	6 – Stirtz	4 – Stirtz	Knapp Center (6,424); Des Moines, IA
February 19, 2025; 6:30 pm, ESPN+		UIC	W 74–57	24–3 (14–3)	25 – Stirtz	8 – Manyawu	7 – Stirtz	Knapp Center (3,449); Des Moines, IA
February 23, 2025; 3:00 pm, ESPN2		at Northern Iowa; Rivalry	W 64–58 ^{OT}	25–3 (15–3)	26 – Stirtz	11 – Manyawu	2 – Stirtz	McLeod Center (6,652); Cedar Falls, IA
February 26, 2025; 7:00 pm, ESPN+		at Evansville	W 65–61	26–3 (16–3)	19 – Abreu	5 – 3 Tied	7 – Stirtz	Ford Center (4,526); Evansville, IN
March 2, 2025; 2:00 pm, ESPN+		Missouri State	W 68–60 ^{OT}	27–3 (17–3)	23 – Stirtz	11 – Banks	3 – Stirtz	Knapp Center (5,122); Des Moines, IA
Conference Tournament
March 7, 2025; 12:00 pm, Gray Media/ESPN+	(1)	vs. (8) Southern Illinois; Arch Madness Quarterfinal	W 70–54	28–3	21 – Howard	11 – Banks	5 – Stirtz	Enterprise Center (6,005); St. Louis, MO
March 8, 2025; 2:30 pm, CBSSN	(1)	vs. (4) Belmont; Arch Madness Semifinal	W 57–50	29–3	24 – Stirtz	7 – Manyawu	2 – 2 Tied	Enterprise Center (7,779); St. Louis, MO
March 9, 2025; 1:15 pm, CBS	(1)	vs. (2) Bradley; Arch Madness Final	W 63–48	30–3	24 – Stirtz	9 – Banks	4 – Stirtz	Enterprise Center (7,952); St. Louis, MO
NCAA tournament
March 20, 2025*; 6:35 pm, TruTV	(11 W)	vs. (6 W) No. 23 Missouri; First Round	W 67–57	31–3	21 – Stirtz	9 – Banks	4 – 2 Tied	Intrust Bank Arena (14,474); Wichita, KS
March 22, 2025*; 5:30 p.m., TNT	(11 W)	vs. (3 W) No. 9 Texas Tech; Second Round	L 64–77	31–4	21 – Stirtz	5 – Combs	8 – Stirtz	Intrust Bank Arena (14,168); Wichita, KS
*Non-conference game. ^{#}Rankings from AP Poll. (#) Tournament seedings in parentheses. W=West. All times are in Central Time.

== Rankings ==
Ranking movements Legend: ██ Increase in ranking ██ Decrease in ranking — = Not ranked RV = Received votes
	Week																				
Poll	Pre	1	2	3	4	5	6	7	8	9	10	11	12	13	14	15	16	17	18	19	Final
AP	—	—	—	RV	RV	RV	RV	RV	RV	—	—	—	—	RV	RV	—	RV	RV	RV	RV	RV
Coaches	—	—	—	RV	RV	RV	RV	RV	RV	—	—	—	—	RV	RV	—	RV	RV	RV	RV	RV
