= 2024–25 Belmont Bruins men's basketball team =

American college basketball season

2024–25 Belmont Bruins men's basketball
- Conference: Missouri Valley Conference
- Record: 22–11 (13–7 MVC)
- Head coach: Casey Alexander (6th season)
- Associate head coach: Brian Ayers; Sean Rutigliano
- Assistant coach: Kerron Johnson
- Home arena: Curb Event Center

2024–25 Missouri Valley Conference men's basketball standings
	Conf.				Overall
Team	W		L	PCT	W		L	PCT
Drake †	17	–	3	.850	31	–	4	.886
Bradley	15	–	5	.750	28	–	9	.757
Northern Iowa	14	–	6	.700	20	–	13	.606
Belmont	13	–	7	.650	22	–	11	.667
Illinois State	10	–	10	.500	22	–	14	.611
UIC	10	–	10	.500	17	–	14	.548
Murray State	9	–	11	.450	16	–	17	.485
Southern Illinois	8	–	12	.400	14	–	19	.424
Indiana State	8	–	12	.400	14	–	18	.438
Evansville	8	–	12	.400	11	–	21	.344
Valparaiso	6	–	14	.300	15	–	19	.441
Missouri State	2	–	18	.100	9	–	23	.281
† 2025 MVC tournament winner

The 2024–25 Belmont Bruins men's basketball team represented Belmont University during the 2024–25 NCAA Division I men's basketball season. The Bruins, led by sixth-year head coach Casey Alexander, played their home games at the Curb Event Center in Nashville, Tennessee as members of the Missouri Valley Conference.

== Previous season ==
The Bruins finished the 2023–24 season 20–13, 12–8 in MVC play to finish in a tie for fourth place. They defeated Valparaiso, before falling to Northern Iowa in the quarterfinals of the MVC tournament.

== Roster ==
2024–25 Belmont Bruins men's basketball team
Players
Coaches

Pos.	#	Name	Height	Weight	Year	Previous school	Hometown
G	0	Win Miller	6 ft 3 in (1.91 m)	185 lb (84 kg)	So	Vestavia Hills High School	Vestavia Hills, Alabama
G	1	Brody Peebles	6 ft 2 in (1.88 m)	170 lb (77 kg)	GS	Liberty	Hartselle, Alabama
G	2	Carter Whitt	6 ft 3 in (1.91 m)	190 lb (86 kg)	GS	Furman	Raleigh, North Carolina
F	3	Jonathan Pierre	6 ft 9 in (2.06 m)	210 lb (95 kg)	Sr	Memphis	Hallandale Beach, Florida
F	4	Aidan Noyes	6 ft 7 in (2.01 m)	195 lb (88 kg)	Jr	Richmond	Cincinnati, Ohio
F	5	Eoin Dillon	6 ft 9 in (2.06 m)	200 lb (91 kg)	Fr	Notre Dame High School	Peoria, Illinois
G	7	Isaiah Walker	6 ft 5 in (1.96 m)	200 lb (91 kg)	Jr	Wyoming High School	Wyoming, Ohio
G	8	Tyler Lundblade	6 ft 5 in (1.96 m)	210 lb (95 kg)	Jr	TCU	Dallas, Texas
G	10	Jabez Jenkins	6 ft 4 in (1.93 m)	185 lb (84 kg)	Fr	Newton High School	Covington, Georgia
F	11	Drew Scharnowski	6 ft 9 in (2.06 m)	225 lb (102 kg)	Fr	Burlington Central High School	Burlington, Illinois
G	13	Cooper Haynes	6 ft 2 in (1.88 m)	185 lb (84 kg)	Fr	Briarcrest Christian School	Memphis, Tennessee
F	14	Sam Orme	6 ft 9 in (2.06 m)	215 lb (98 kg)	Fr	Carmel High School	Carmel, Indiana
G	20	Aidan Braccia	6 ft 1 in (1.85 m)	170 lb (77 kg)	So	Sacred Heart Prep	Atherton, California
F	21	Brigham Rogers	6 ft 9 in (2.06 m)	240 lb (109 kg)	So	Blessed Trinity High School	Woodstock, Georgia
G	23	Jake Dykstra	6 ft 4 in (1.93 m)	195 lb (88 kg)	Jr	Christ Presbyterian Academy	Nashville, Tennessee
G	24	Keith Robbins	6 ft 5 in (1.96 m)	180 lb (82 kg)	So	John Milledge Academy	Milledgeville, Georgia

Head coach

- Casey Alexander (Belmont)

Assistant coach(es)

- Brian Ayers (Lipscomb)
- Sean Rutigliano (Cortland State)
- Kerron Johnson (Belmont)

Legend

- (C) Team captain
- (S) Suspended
- (I) Ineligible
- (W) Walk-on
- Injured
- Current redshirt

Roster
Last update: November 22, 2024

== Schedule and results ==
Date time, TV	Rank^{#}	Opponent^{#}	Result	Record	Site (attendance) city, state
Regular Season
November 4, 2024*; 6:30 pm, ESPN+		Maryville–St. Louis	W 93–70	1–0	Curb Event Center (1,716); Nashville, TN
November 8, 2024*; 6:30 pm, ESPN+		Furman	L 74–76	1–1	Curb Event Center (2,194); Nashville, TN
November 12, 2024*; 7:00 pm, ESPN+		at Lipscomb; Battle of the Boulevard	W 80–79	2–1	Allen Arena (4,022); Nashville, TN
November 15, 2024*; 6:00 pm		at Air Force	W 79–71	3–1	Clune Arena (2,001); Colorado Springs, CO
November 19, 2024*; 6:30 pm, ESPN+		Oral Roberts	W 90–80	4–1	Curb Event Center (1,273); Nashville, TN
November 26, 2024*; 7:30 pm, CBSSN		vs. Loyola Marymount; Cancún Challenge Riviera Division Semifinal	L 63–77	4–2	Hard Rock Hotel Riviera Maya (417); Cancún, Mexico
November 27, 2024*; 5:00 pm, CBSSN		vs. Tulane; Cancún Challenge Riviera Division Third Place	W 89–66	5–2	Hard Rock Hotel Riviera Maya (389); Cancún, Mexico
November 29, 2024*; 4:00 pm, ESPN+		Gardner–Webb; Cancún Challenge US Game	W 83–74	6–2	Curb Event Center (1,211); Nashville, TN
December 4, 2024; 6:00 pm, Gray Media/ESPN+		Illinois State	W 99–97 ^{OT}	7–2 (1–0)	Curb Event Center (1,301); Nashville, TN
December 7, 2024*; 2:30 pm, ESPN+		Middle Tennessee	W 82–79	8–2	Curb Event Center (2,049); Nashville, TN
December 14, 2024*; 5:00 pm, ESPN+		at Richmond	W 93–86	9–2	Robins Center (5,041); Richmond, VA
December 19, 2024*; 6:30 pm, ESPN+		UC Irvine	L 84–92	9–3	Curb Event Center (1,732); Nashville, TN
December 29, 2024; 1:00 pm, ESPN+		at Drake	L 46–65	9–4 (1–1)	The Knapp Center (5,231); Des Moines, IA
January 1, 2025; 8:00 pm, Gray Media/ESPN+		at Northern Iowa	L 70–76	9–5 (1–2)	McLeod Center (3,049); Cedar Falls, IA
January 4, 2025; 4:00 pm, ESPN+		UIC	W 92–87	10–5 (2–2)	Curb Event Center (1,649); Nashville, TN
January 8, 2025; 6:30 pm, ESPN+		Southern Illinois	W 90–86	11–5 (3–2)	Curb Event Center (1,504); Nashville, TN
January 11, 2025; 12:00 pm, ESPN+		at Indiana State	W 84–79	12–5 (4–2)	Hulman Center (4,623); Terre Haute, IN
January 14, 2025; 6:30 pm, ESPN+		Valparaiso	W 71–64	13–5 (5–2)	Curb Event Center (1,336); Nashville, TN
January 18, 2025; 1:00 pm, ESPN+		at Evansville	W 85–82	14–5 (6–2)	Ford Center (4,986); Evansville, IN
January 21, 2025; 6:30 pm, ESPN+		Bradley	L 77–89	14–6 (6–3)	Curb Event Center (1,788); Nashville, TN
January 25, 2025; 3:00 pm, ESPN+		at Murray State	W 95–77	15–6 (7–3)	CFSB Center (5,706); Murray, KY
January 29, 2025; 8:00 pm, Gray Media/ESPN+		at Illinois State	L 78–81	15–7 (7–4)	CEFCU Arena (3,477); Normal, IL
February 2, 2025; 2:00 pm, ESPN+		Evansville	L 75–80	15–8 (7–5)	Curb Event Center (1,631); Nashville, TN
February 5, 2025; 8:00 pm, Gray Media/ESPN+		at Bradley	W 80–77	16–8 (8–5)	Carver Arena (4,869); Peoria, IL
February 8, 2025; 4:00 pm, ESPN+		Missouri State	W 85–68	17–8 (9–5)	Curb Event Center (2,210); Nashville, TN
February 12, 2025; 7:00 pm, ESPN+		at Valparaiso	L 86–101	17–9 (9–6)	Athletics–Recreation Center (755); Valparaiso, IN
February 15, 2025; 6:00 pm, ESPN+		at Southern Illinois	W 73–68	18–9 (10–6)	Banterra Center (4,304); Carbondale, IL
February 19, 2025; 6:30 pm, ESPN+		Northern Iowa	L 75–82	18–10 (10–7)	Curb Event Center (1,605); Nashville, TN
February 22, 2025; 5:00 pm, ESPN+		Indiana State	W 77–75	19–10 (11–7)	Curb Event Center (2,410); Nashville, TN
February 26, 2025; 7:00 pm, ESPN+		at Missouri State	W 74–65	20–10 (12–7)	Great Southern Bank Arena (1,683); Springfield, MO
March 2, 2025; 2:00 pm, CBSSN		Murray State	W 70–60	21–10 (13–7)	Curb Event Center (2,051); Nashville, TN
Conference Tournament
March 7, 2025; 2:30 pm, Gray Media/ESPN+	(4)	vs. (5) Illinois State; Arch Madness Quarterfinal	W 76–63	22–10	Enterprise Center (6,005); St. Louis, MO
March 8, 2025; 2:30 pm, CBSSN	(4)	vs. (1) Drake; Arch Madness Semifinal	L 50–57	22–11	Enterprise Center (7,779); St. Louis, MO
*Non-conference game. ^{#}Rankings from AP Poll. (#) Tournament seedings in parentheses. All times are in Central.
