= 2024–25 Indiana State Sycamores men's basketball team =

American college basketball season

2024–25 Indiana State Sycamores men's basketball
- Conference: Missouri Valley Conference
- Record: 14–18 (8–12 Missouri Valley Conference)
- Head coach: Matthew Graves (1st season)
- Associate head coach: Mark Slessinger
- Assistant coaches: Justin Furr; Tim Johnson; Jake Odum; Bradley Feig
- Home arena: Hulman Center

2024–25 Missouri Valley Conference men's basketball standings
	Conf.				Overall
Team	W		L	PCT	W		L	PCT
Drake †	17	–	3	.850	31	–	4	.886
Bradley	15	–	5	.750	28	–	9	.757
Northern Iowa	14	–	6	.700	20	–	13	.606
Belmont	13	–	7	.650	22	–	11	.667
Illinois State	10	–	10	.500	22	–	14	.611
UIC	10	–	10	.500	17	–	14	.548
Murray State	9	–	11	.450	16	–	17	.485
Southern Illinois	8	–	12	.400	14	–	19	.424
Indiana State	8	–	12	.400	14	–	18	.438
Evansville	8	–	12	.400	11	–	21	.344
Valparaiso	6	–	14	.300	15	–	19	.441
Missouri State	2	–	18	.100	9	–	23	.281
† 2025 MVC tournament winner

The 2024–25 Indiana State Sycamores men's basketball team represented Indiana State University during the 2024–25 NCAA Division I men's basketball season. The Sycamores, led by first-year head coach Matthew Graves, played their home games at the Hulman Center in Terre Haute, Indiana as members of the Missouri Valley Conference.

== Previous season ==
The Sycamores finished the 2023–24 season 32–7, 17–3 in MVC play to finish as Missouri Valley regular season champions. They defeated Missouri State and Northern Iowa, before falling to Drake in the MVC tournament championship game. They received an invitation to the NIT, where they received a #1 seed. They would defeat SMU, Minnesota, Cincinnati, and Utah, before falling to Seton Hall in the championship game.

== Roster ==
2024–25 Indiana State Sycamores men's basketball team
Players
Coaches

Pos.	#	Name	Height	Weight	Year	Previous school	Hometown
G	0	Tyran Cook	6 ft 2 in (1.88 m)	195 lb (88 kg)	So	VMI	Milwaukee, Wisconsin
G	1	Josiah LeGree	6 ft 0 in (1.83 m)	165 lb (75 kg)	Fr	Saint Frances Academy	Baltimore, Maryland
G	2	Samage Teel	6 ft 2 in (1.88 m)	185 lb (84 kg)	Sr	Presbyterian	Greenville, North Carolina
G	4	Jahni Summers	6 ft 6 in (1.98 m)	185 lb (84 kg)	So	Coffeyville Community College	Evansville, Indiana
G	5	Jayan Walker	6 ft 6 in (1.98 m)	200 lb (91 kg)	Fr	Combine Academy	Raleigh, North Carolina
F	8	Camp Wagner	6 ft 6 in (1.98 m)	190 lb (86 kg)	So	Rice	Dallas, Texas
G	10	K'mani Doughty	6 ft 5 in (1.96 m)	190 lb (86 kg)	GS	Utah Valley	Brooklyn, New York
F	11	Aaron Gray	6 ft 7 in (2.01 m)	220 lb (100 kg)	GS	Niagara	Providence, Rhode Island
G	12	Caden Huttenlocker	6 ft 2 in (1.88 m)	185 lb (84 kg)	Jr	Lincoln Trail College	Ellettsville, Indiana
G	13	Cooper Bean	6 ft 4 in (1.93 m)	190 lb (86 kg)	RS Fr	Noblesville High School	Noblesville, Indiana
G	14	Bruno Alocen	6 ft 6 in (1.98 m)	180 lb (82 kg)	Fr	Bàsquet Manresa	Barcelona, Spain
C	15	Markus Harding	6 ft 10 in (2.08 m)	250 lb (113 kg)	GS	Central Michigan	Toronto, Ontario
F	23	Jaden Daughtry	6 ft 7 in (2.01 m)	230 lb (104 kg)	So	Hargrave Military Academy	Richmond, Virginia
F	24	Merritt Alderink	6 ft 7 in (2.01 m)	215 lb (98 kg)	Fr	Zeeland West High School	Zeeland, Michigan
C	35	Derek Vorst	6 ft 10 in (2.08 m)	250 lb (113 kg)	So	Rossford High School	Luckey, Ohio

Head coach

- Matthew Graves (Butler)

Assistant coach(es)

- Mark Slessinger (Aurora)
- Justin Furr (Wingate)
- Tim Johnson (Wofford)
- Jake Odum (Indiana State)
- Bradley Feig (New Orleans)

Legend

- (C) Team captain
- (S) Suspended
- (I) Ineligible
- (W) Walk-on
- Injured
- Current redshirt

Roster
Last update: November 24, 2024

== Schedule and results ==
Date time, TV	Rank^{#}	Opponent^{#}	Result	Record	Site (attendance) city, state
Regular Season
November 4, 2024*; 7:30 pm		vs. Florida Atlantic; Total Athlete Tip-Off	L 64–97	0–1	Wooden Family Fieldhouse (1,200); Xenia, OH
November 7, 2024*; 7:00 pm, ESPN+		Eureka	W 93–48	1–1	Hulman Center (6,381); Terre Haute, IN
November 12, 2024*; 7:00 pm, ESPN+		SIU Edwardsville	L 72–77	1–2	Hulman Center (4,264); Terre Haute, IN
November 16, 2024*; 2:00 pm, ESPN+		at Ball State	W 94–84	2–2	Worthen Arena (4,021); Muncie, IN
November 22, 2024*; 7:00 pm, ESPN+		Chicago State	W 97–61	3–2	Hulman Center (4,379); Terre Haute, IN
November 25, 2024*; 8:00 pm, ESPN+		at Southern Indiana	L 77–87	3–3	Liberty Arena (2,351); Evansville, IN
November 29, 2024*; 4:30 pm, FloHoops		vs. Arkansas State; Baha Mar Hoops Nassau Championship	L 81–86	3–4	Baha Mar Convention Center (392); Nassau, Bahamas
November 30, 2024*; 2:00 pm, FloHoops		vs. Iona; Baha Mar Hoops Nassau Championship	W 83–80	4–4	Baha Mar Convention Center (325); Nassau, Bahamas
December 1, 2024*; 7:00 pm, FloHoops		vs. Tarleton State; Baha Mar Hoops Nassau Championship	W 87–71	5–4	Baha Mar Convention Center (212); Nassau, Bahamas
December 7, 2024; 8:00 pm, ESPN+		at Missouri State	W 80–77	6–4 (1–0)	Great Southern Bank Arena (2,357); Springfield, MO
December 18, 2024; 7:00 pm, MVC TV Network		Murray State	W 84–74	7–4 (2–0)	Hulman Center (4,132); Terre Haute, IN
December 21, 2024*; 1:00 pm, ESPN+		UHSP	W 101–53	8–4	Hulman Center (4,109); Terre Haute, IN
December 29, 2024*; 12:00 pm, BTN		at Ohio State	L 83–103	8–5	Value City Arena (14,388); Columbus, OH
January 1, 2025; 7:00 pm, MVC TV Network		Bradley	L 89–90 ^{OT}	8–6 (2–1)	Hulman Center (5,083); Terre Haute, IN
January 4, 2025; 2:00 pm, ESPN+		at Evansville	W 66–62	9–6 (3–1)	Ford Center (5,287); Evansville, IN
January 8, 2025; 8:00 pm, ESPN+		at Valparaiso	L 95–98	9–7 (3–2)	Athletics–Recreation Center (1,471); Valparaiso, IN
January 11, 2025; 1:00 pm, ESPN+		Belmont	L 79–84	9–8 (3–3)	Hulman Center (4,623); Terre Haute, IN
January 15, 2025; 8:00 pm, ESPN+		at Bradley	L 65–118	9–9 (3–4)	Carver Arena (5,330); Peoria, IL
January 18, 2025; 6:00 pm, ESPNU		Drake	L 53–71	9–10 (3–5)	Hulman Center (6,013); Terre Haute, IN
January 21, 2025; 8:00 pm, ESPN+		at Illinois State	L 81–85	9–11 (3–6)	CEFCU Arena (3,617); Normal, IL
January 25, 2025; 1:00 pm, ESPN+		Northern Iowa	L 56–74	9–12 (3–7)	Hulman Center (5,104); Terre Haute, IN
January 29, 2025; 7:00 pm, ESPN+		Missouri State	W 72–67	10–12 (4–7)	Hulman Center (4,332); Terre Haute, IN
February 1, 2025; 3:00 pm, ESPN+		at UIC	W 88–83	11–12 (5–7)	Credit Union 1 Arena (1,352); Chicago, IL
February 5, 2025; 7:00 pm, ESPN+		Valparaiso	W 80–62	12–12 (6–7)	Hulman Center (4,152); Terre Haute, IN
February 8, 2025; 6:00 pm, ESPN+		at Drake	L 81–85 ^{OT}	12–13 (6–8)	The Knapp Center (4,394); Des Moines, IA
February 11, 2025; 8:00 pm, ESPN+		at Northern Iowa	L 73–88	12–14 (6–9)	McLeod Center (3,824); Cedar Falls, IA
February 15, 2025; 1:00 pm, ESPN+		Illinois State	W 85–76	13–14 (7–9)	Hulman Center (5,198); Terre Haute, IN
February 19, 2025; 7:00 pm, MVC TV Network		Evansville	L 74–79	13–15 (7–10)	Hulman Center (4,323); Terre Haute, IN
February 22, 2025; 6:00 pm, ESPN+		at Belmont	L 75–77	13–16 (7–11)	Curb Event Center (2,410); Nashville, TN
February 25, 2025; 8:00 pm, ESPN+		at Murray State	L 75–85	13–17 (7–12)	CFSB Center (4,683); Murray, KY
March 2, 2025; 1:00 pm, ESPN+		Southern Illinois	W 95–77	14–17 (8–12)	Hulman Center (4,892); Terre Haute, IN
Conference Tournament
March 6, 2025; 12:00 pm, MVC TV Network	(9)	vs. (8) Southern Illinois; Arch Madness Opening Round	L 85–86	14–18	Enterprise Center (4,402); St. Louis, MO
*Non-conference game. ^{#}Rankings from AP Poll. (#) Tournament seedings in parentheses. All times are in Eastern.
