= 2024–25 Northern Iowa Panthers men's basketball team =

American college basketball season

2024–25 Northern Iowa Panthers men's basketball

NIT, First Round
- Conference: Missouri Valley Conference
- Record: 20–13 (14–6 MVC)
- Head coach: Ben Jacobson (19th season)
- Associate head coach: P. J. Hogan
- Assistant coaches: Seth Tuttle; Gameli Ahelegbe
- Home arena: McLeod Center

2024–25 Missouri Valley Conference men's basketball standings
	Conf.				Overall
Team	W		L	PCT	W		L	PCT
Drake †	17	–	3	.850	31	–	4	.886
Bradley	15	–	5	.750	28	–	9	.757
Northern Iowa	14	–	6	.700	20	–	13	.606
Belmont	13	–	7	.650	22	–	11	.667
Illinois State	10	–	10	.500	22	–	14	.611
UIC	10	–	10	.500	17	–	14	.548
Murray State	9	–	11	.450	16	–	17	.485
Southern Illinois	8	–	12	.400	14	–	19	.424
Indiana State	8	–	12	.400	14	–	18	.438
Evansville	8	–	12	.400	11	–	21	.344
Valparaiso	6	–	14	.300	15	–	19	.441
Missouri State	2	–	18	.100	9	–	23	.281
† 2025 MVC tournament winner

The 2024–25 Northern Iowa Panthers men's basketball team represented the University of Northern Iowa during the 2024–25 NCAA Division I men's basketball season. The Panthers, led by 19th-year head coach Ben Jacobson, played their home games at the McLeod Center located in Cedar Falls, Iowa as members of the Missouri Valley Conference. They finished the season 20–13, 14–6 in MVC play to finish in third place. They were upset in the quarterfinals of the MVC tournament by Valparaiso. They received an at-large berth to the National Invitation Tournament where they lost to SMU in the first round.

== Previous season ==
The Panthers finished the 2023–24 season 19–14, 12–8 in MVC play to finish in a tie for fourth place. They defeated Belmont, before falling to top-seeded Indiana State in the semifinals of the MVC tournament.

== Roster ==
2024–25 Northern Iowa Panthers men's basketball team
Players
Coaches

Pos.	#	Name	Height	Weight	Year	Previous school	Hometown
G	0	Redek Born	6 ft 3 in (1.91 m)	180 lb (82 kg)	Fr	Norwalk High School	Norwalk, Iowa
G	1	Cael Schmitt	6 ft 2 in (1.88 m)	185 lb (84 kg)	GS	Coe College	Dubuque, Iowa
G	3	Max Weisbrod	6 ft 4 in (1.93 m)	200 lb (91 kg)	Jr	Northern Michigan	DeForest, Wisconsin
G	4	Trey Campbell	6 ft 4 in (1.93 m)	190 lb (86 kg)	Jr	Cedar Falls High School	Cedar Falls, Iowa
F	5	Wes Rubin	6 ft 8 in (2.03 m)	225 lb (102 kg)	RS Fr	Simeon Career Academy	Chicago, Illinois
G/F	7	Ben Schwieger	6 ft 8 in (2.03 m)	205 lb (93 kg)	RS Jr	Loyola Chicago	Aurora, Illinois
G	10	RJ Taylor	5 ft 11 in (1.8 m)	175 lb (79 kg)	So	Grand Blanc High School	Grand Blanc, Michigan
C	11	Jacob Hutson	6 ft 11 in (2.11 m)	250 lb (113 kg)	Sr	Loyola Chicago	Edina, Minnesota
G	12	Charlie Miller (W)	6 ft 0 in (1.83 m)	165 lb (75 kg)	RS So	Lumberton High School	Lumberton, North Carolina
F	13	Will Hornseth	6 ft 8 in (2.03 m)	230 lb (104 kg)	Fr	De Pere High School	De Pere, Wisconsin
G	15	Cade Courbat	6 ft 8 in (2.03 m)	215 lb (98 kg)	Fr	Cedar Falls High School	Cedar Falls, Iowa
F	20	Chase Courbat	6 ft 9 in (2.06 m)	245 lb (111 kg)	RS Jr	Cedar Falls High School	Cedar Falls, Iowa
F	22	Kyle Pock	6 ft 6 in (1.98 m)	215 lb (98 kg)	So	Bolivar High School	Bolivar, Missouri
G	30	Hunter Jacobson (W)	6 ft 1 in (1.85 m)	180 lb (82 kg)	RS So	Cedar Falls High School	Cedar Falls, Iowa
G/F	32	Tytan Anderson	6 ft 6 in (1.98 m)	205 lb (93 kg)	RS So	North Scott High School	Eldridge, Iowa
G/F	35	Leon Bond III	6 ft 6 in (1.98 m)	200 lb (91 kg)	RS So	Virginia	Wauwatosa, Wisconsin

Head coach

- Ben Jacobson (North Dakota)

Assistant coach(es)

- P. J. Hogan (Morningside)
- Seth Tuttle (Northern Iowa)
- Gameli Ahelegbe (Minnesota State)

Legend

- (C) Team captain
- (S) Suspended
- (I) Ineligible
- (W) Walk-on
- Injured
- Current redshirt

Roster
Last update: November 25, 2024

== Schedule and results ==
Date time, TV	Rank^{#}	Opponent^{#}	Result	Record	Site (attendance) city, state
Regular season
November 4, 2024*; 7:00 pm, ESPN+		Dubuque	W 96–54	1–0	McLeod Center (3,104); Cedar Falls, IA
November 7, 2024*; 7:00 pm, CFU 15/Marquee/ESPN+		Milwaukee	W 87–68	2–0	McLeod Center (3,247); Cedar Falls, IA
November 10, 2024*; 1:00 pm, ESPN+		UC Irvine	L 60–80	2–1	McLeod Center (3,513); Cedar Falls, IA
November 14, 2024*; 6:30 pm, ESPN+		at Wichita State	L 73–79	2–2	Charles Koch Arena (5,927); Wichita, KS
November 19, 2024*; 7:00 pm, CFU 15/Marquee/ESPN+		Western Illinois	W 82–56	3–2	McLeod Center (3,659); Cedar Falls, IA
November 28, 2024*; 7:00 pm, ESPNU		vs. North Texas; NIT Season Tip-Off Semifinal	L 48–68	3–3	State Farm Field House (1,233); Kissimmee, FL
November 29, 2024*; 8:00 pm, ESPNU		vs. St. Bonaventure; NIT Season Tip-Off Third Place	L 56–68	3–4	State Farm Field House (1,154); Kissimmee, FL
December 4, 2024; 7:00 pm, ESPN+		at UIC	W 83–56	4–4 (1–0)	Credit Union 1 Arena (732); Chicago, IL
December 7, 2024*; 5:00 pm, ESPN+		Northern Illinois	W 101–57	5–4	McLeod Center (3,742); Cedar Falls, IA
December 13, 2024*; 7:00 pm, ESPN+		Omaha	W 78–58	6–4	McLeod Center (3,284); Cedar Falls, IA
December 16, 2024*; 7:00 pm, ESPN+		Montana	W 104–76	7–4	McLeod Center (3,045); Cedar Falls, IA
December 21, 2024*; 3:00 pm, FloHoops		vs. Washington State; Holiday Hoops Classic	L 68–76	7–5	Orleans Arena; Paradise, NV
December 29, 2024; 1:00 pm, ESPN+		Southern Illinois	W 78–67	8–5 (2–0)	McLeod Center (3,804); Cedar Falls, IA
January 1, 2025; 8:00 pm, MVC TV Network/ESPN+		Belmont	W 76–70	9–5 (3–0)	McLeod Center (3,049); Cedar Falls, IA
January 4, 2025; 3:00 pm, ESPN+		at Valparaiso	L 73–80	9–6 (3–1)	Athletics–Recreation Center (1,917); Valparaiso, IN
January 8, 2025; 6:00 pm, MVC TV Network/ESPN+		Murray State	L 68–71	9–7 (3–2)	McLeod Center (3,249); Cedar Falls, IA
January 11, 2025; 6:00 pm, ESPN+		at Illinois State	W 85–84	10–7 (4–2)	CEFCU Arena (4,712); Normal, IL
January 14, 2025; 7:00 pm, CFU 15/Marquee/ESPN+		Evansville	W 73–56	11–7 (5–2)	McLeod Center (3,431); Cedar Falls, IA
January 18, 2025; 6:00 pm, ESPN+		at Southern Illinois	L 49–73	11–8 (5–3)	Banterra Center (4,230); Carbondale, IL
January 21, 2025; 7:00 pm, ESPN+		Missouri State	W 79–68	12–8 (6–3)	McLeod Center (3,491); Cedar Falls, IA
January 25, 2025; 12:00 pm, ESPN+		at Indiana State	W 74–56	13–8 (7–3)	Hulman Center (5,104); Terre Haute, IN
January 29, 2025; 6:00 pm, MVC TV Network/ESPN+		at Drake; Rivalry	L 52–66	13–9 (7–4)	The Knapp Center (5,464); Des Moines, IA
February 2, 2025; 3:00 pm, ESPN2		Bradley	W 83–69	14–9 (8–4)	McLeod Center (4,121); Cedar Falls, IA
February 5, 2025; 6:00 pm, MVC TV Network/ESPN+		at Missouri State	W 66–61	15–9 (9–4)	Great Southern Bank Arena (2,011); Springfield, MO
February 8, 2025; 5:00 pm, ESPNU		Illinois State	W 68–65	16–9 (10–4)	McLeod Center (4,809); Cedar Falls, IA
February 11, 2025; 7:00 pm, ESPN+		Indiana State	W 88–73	17–9 (11–4)	McLeod Center (3,824); Cedar Falls, IA
February 17, 2025; 6:00 pm		vs. Murray State; Game rescheduled due to power outage caused by inclement weather	W 74–67	18–9 (12–4)	Curb Event Center (472); Nashville, TN
February 19, 2025; 6:30 pm, ESPN+		at Belmont	W 82–75	19–9 (13–4)	Curb Event Center (1,605); Nashville, TN
February 23, 2025; 3:00 pm, ESPN2		Drake; Rivalry	L 58–64 ^{OT}	19–10 (13–5)	McLeod Center (6,652); Cedar Falls, IA
February 26, 2025; 6:00 pm, MVC TV Network/ESPN+		UIC	W 74–52	20–10 (14–5)	McLeod Center (4,098); Cedar Falls, IA
March 2, 2025; 1:00 pm, ESPN2		at Bradley	L 56–73	20–11 (14–6)	Carver Arena (7,537); Peoria, IL
MVC tournament
March 7, 2025; 8:30 pm, MVC TV Network/ESPN+	(3)	vs. (11) Valparaiso; Arch Madness Quarterfinal	L 63–64	20–12	Enterprise Center (6,090); St. Louis, MO
NIT
March 19, 2025; 8:00 pm, ESPN2		at (1) SMU; First round – Dallas Region	L 63–73	20–13	Moody Coliseum; Dallas, TX
*Non-conference game. ^{#}Rankings from AP Poll. (#) Tournament seedings in parentheses. All times are in Central.
