= 2024–25 Evansville Purple Aces men's basketball team =

American college basketball season

2024–25 Evansville Purple Aces men's basketball
- Conference: Missouri Valley Conference
- Record: 11–21 (8–12 MVC)
- Head coach: David Ragland (3rd season)
- Associate head coach: Craig Snow
- Assistant coaches: George Swanson; Roosevelt Jones; Peter Funk; D J Balentine
- Home arena: Ford Center

2024–25 Missouri Valley Conference men's basketball standings
	Conf.				Overall
Team	W		L	PCT	W		L	PCT
Drake †	17	–	3	.850	31	–	4	.886
Bradley	15	–	5	.750	28	–	9	.757
Northern Iowa	14	–	6	.700	20	–	13	.606
Belmont	13	–	7	.650	22	–	11	.667
Illinois State	10	–	10	.500	22	–	14	.611
UIC	10	–	10	.500	17	–	14	.548
Murray State	9	–	11	.450	16	–	17	.485
Southern Illinois	8	–	12	.400	14	–	19	.424
Indiana State	8	–	12	.400	14	–	18	.438
Evansville	8	–	12	.400	11	–	21	.344
Valparaiso	6	–	14	.300	15	–	19	.441
Missouri State	2	–	18	.100	9	–	23	.281
† 2025 MVC tournament winner

The 2024–25 Evansville Purple Aces men's basketball team represented the University of Evansville during the 2024–25 NCAA Division I men's basketball season. The Purple Aces, led by third-year head coach David Ragland, played their home games at the Ford Center in Evansville, Indiana as members of the Missouri Valley Conference (MVC).

== Previous season ==
The Purple Aces finished the 2023–24 season 17–18, 6–14 in MVC play, to finish in tenth place. They defeated Illinois State, before falling to eventual tournament champions Drake in the quarterfinals of the MVC tournament. They received an invitation to the CBI, receiving the #11 seed, where they defeated Quinnipiac in the first round, before falling to eventual tournament champions Seattle in the quarterfinals.

== Roster ==
2024–25 Evansville Purple Aces men's basketball team
Players
Coaches

Pos.	#	Name	Height	Weight	Year	Previous school	Hometown
F	0	Gabriel Pozzato	6 ft 7 in (2.01 m)	—	Fr	NBA Global Academy	Rome, Italy
G	1	Tanner Cuff	6 ft 7 in (2.01 m)	—	Sr	Salt Lake Community College	American Fork, UT
G	3	Cam Haffner	6 ft 2 in (1.88 m)	180 lb (82 kg)	Jr	Eastern Illinois	Westfield, IN
G	5	Braylon Jackson	6 ft 5 in (1.96 m)	—	So	Oldsmar Christian Academy	Kennesaw, GA
G	6	Gui Tesch	6 ft 9 in (2.06 m)	—	RS So	IMG Academy	Rio de Janeiro, Brazil
G	9	Kaia Berridge	6 ft 4 in (1.93 m)	—	Fr	Archbishop Riordan High School	Whangārei, New Zealand
G	10	Tyler Myers	5 ft 10 in (1.78 m)	—	So	Evansville Day School	Evansville, IN
F	11	Joshua Hughes	6 ft 10 in (2.08 m)	—	So	BA Centre of Excellence	Brisbane, Australia
G	12	Tayshawn Comer	6 ft 1 in (1.85 m)	190 lb (86 kg)	Jr	Eastern Kentucky	Indianapolis, IN
F	21	Connor Turnbull	6 ft 10 in (2.08 m)	225 lb (102 kg)	Jr	Butler	St. Paul, MO
F	22	Ramondo II Battle	6 ft 8 in (2.03 m)	—	Jr	Walters State Community College	McKinney, TX
G	23	Cameron Gehlhausen	6 ft 5 in (1.96 m)	—	Jr	Evansville North High School	Evansville, IN
F	32	Dakota Candler	6 ft 5 in (1.96 m)	—	So	South Knox High School	Vincennes, IN
C	33	Michael Day	6 ft 11 in (2.11 m)	—	So	Albuquerque Basketball Club Prep	Middleton, ID
G	40	Weston Aigner	6 ft 3 in (1.91 m)	—	So	Castle High School	Newburgh, IN
F	45	Trent Hundley	6 ft 6 in (1.98 m)	—	Jr	Rio Grande	Mount Orab, OH

Head coach

- David Ragland (Evansville)

Assistant coach(es)

- Craig Snow (Evansville)
- George Swanson (Northwest)
- Roosevelt Jones (Butler)
- Peter Funk (Valparaiso)
- D J Balentine (Evansville)

Legend

- (C) Team captain
- (S) Suspended
- (I) Ineligible
- (W) Walk-on
- Injured
- Current redshirt

Roster
Last update: November 25, 2024

== Schedule and results ==
Date time, TV	Rank^{#}	Opponent^{#}	Result	Record	Site (attendance) city, state
Exhibition
October 26, 2024*; 1:00 p.m.		Tiffin	W 86–60	–	Ford Center (3,105); Evansville, IN
Regular season
November 5, 2024*; 7:00 p.m., ESPN+		at North Texas	L 63–80	0–1	The Super Pit (3,451); Denton, TX
November 9, 2024*; 1:00 p.m., ESPN+		Brescia	W 96–49	1–1	Ford Center (4,112); Evansville, IN
November 13, 2024*; 6:30 p.m., ESPN+		at Middle Tennessee	L 63–80	1–2	Murphy Center (3,509); Murfreesboro, TN
November 16, 2024*; 1:00 p.m., ESPN+		Radford	L 81–92	1–3	Ford Center (4,306); Evansville, IN
November 19, 2024*; 6:00 p.m., B1G+		at Ohio State	L 30–80	1–4	Value City Arena (9,824); Columbus, OH
November 22, 2024*; 7:00 p.m., ESPN+		Green Bay; Ohio State MTE	W 98–81	2–4	Ford Center (4,418); Evansville, IN
November 24, 2024*; 3:00 p.m., ESPN+		Campbell; Ohio State MTE	W 66–53	3–4	Ford Center (3,823); Evansville, IN
December 3, 2024; 7:00 p.m., Gray Media/ESPN+		at Murray State	L 61–63	3–5 (0–1)	CFSB Center (5,358); Murray, KY
December 7, 2024*; 1:00 p.m., ESPN+		Western Kentucky	L 65–79	3–6	Ford Center (5,316); Evansville, IN
December 12, 2024*; 7:00 p.m., ESPN+		Chattanooga	L 67–75	3–7	Ford Center (3,862); Evansville, IN
December 18, 2024*; 7:00 p.m., ESPN+		at UT Arlington	L 54–80	3–8	College Park Center (1,256); Arlington, TX
December 21, 2024*; 1:00 p.m., ESPN+		at Ball State	L 43–80	3–9	Worthen Arena (3,521); Muncie, IN
December 29, 2024; 4:00 p.m., ESPN+		Missouri State	W 57–40	4–9 (1–1)	Ford Center (5,128); Evansville, IN
January 1, 2025; 1:00 p.m., ESPN+		at Southern Illinois	W 68–53	5–9 (2–1)	Banterra Center (6,030); Carbondale, IL
January 4, 2025; 1:00 p.m., ESPN+		Indiana State	L 62–66	5–10 (2–2)	Ford Center (5,287); Evansville, IN
January 8, 2025; 7:00 p.m., ESPN+		Illinois State	W 69–51	6–10 (3–2)	Ford Center (4,036); Evansville, IN
January 11, 2025; 5:00 p.m., ESPN+		at Drake	L 40–63	6–11 (3–3)	The Knapp Center (3,930); Des Moines, IA
January 14, 2025; 7:00 p.m., ESPN+		at Northern Iowa	L 56–73	6–12 (3–4)	McLeod Center (3,431); Cedar Falls, IA
January 18, 2025; 1:00 p.m., ESPN+		Belmont	L 82–85	6–13 (3–5)	Ford Center (4,986); Evansville, IN
January 22, 2025; 7:00 p.m., ESPN+		UIC	L 67–78	6–14 (3–6)	Ford Center (3,987); Evansville, IN
January 25, 2025; 3:00 p.m., ESPN+		at Valparaiso	W 78–68	7–14 (4–6)	Athletics–Recreation Center (1,361); Valparaiso, IN
January 29, 2025; 7:00 p.m., ESPN+		Murray State	W 79–74	8–14 (5–6)	Ford Center (5,318); Evansville, IN
February 2, 2025; 2:00 p.m., ESPN+		at Belmont	W 80–75	9–14 (6–6)	Curb Event Center (1,631); Nashville, TN
February 5, 2025; 7:00 p.m., ESPN+		Southern Illinois	L 59–68	9–15 (6–7)	Ford Center (4,435); Evansville, IN
February 8, 2025; 7:00 p.m., CBSSN		Bradley	L 74–80	9–16 (6–8)	Ford Center (5,810); Evansville, IN
February 12, 2025; 7:00 p.m., ESPN+		at Missouri State	L 54–71	9–17 (6–9)	Great Southern Bank Arena (1,438); Springfield, MO
February 16, 2025; 7:00 p.m., ESPN+		Valparaiso	W 79–69	10–17 (7–9)	Ford Center (4,736); Evansville, IN
February 19, 2025; 6:00 p.m., Gray Media/ESPN+		at Indiana State	W 79–74	11–17 (8–9)	Hulman Center (4,323); Terre Haute, IN
February 22, 2025; 2:00 p.m., ESPN+		at UIC	L 77–82	11–18 (8–10)	Credit Union 1 Arena (994); Chicago, IL
February 26, 2025; 7:00 p.m., ESPN+		Drake	L 61–65	11–19 (8–11)	Ford Center (4,526); Evansville, IN
March 2, 2025; 2:00 p.m., ESPN+		at Illinois State	L 53–62	11–20 (8–12)	CEFCU Arena (5,072); Normal, IL
MVC tournament
March 6, 2025; 6:00 p.m., Gray Media/ESPN+	(10)	vs. (7) Murray State; Arch Madness Opening Round	L 53–74	11–21	Enterprise Center; St. Louis, MO
*Non-conference game. ^{#}Rankings from AP poll. (#) Tournament seedings in parentheses. All times are in Central.
