= 2024–25 Missouri State Bears basketball team =

American college basketball season

2024–25 Missouri State Bears basketball
- Conference: Missouri Valley Conference
- Record: 9–23 (2–18 MVC)
- Head coach: Cuonzo Martin (1st in current stint, 4th overall season)
- Assistant coaches: Tarrance Crump; Dr. Carson Cunningham; Marco Harris; Steve Woodberry
- Home arena: Great Southern Bank Arena

2024–25 Missouri Valley Conference men's basketball standings
| | Conf. | | | | Overall |
| Team | W | | L | PCT | W | | L | PCT |
|---|---|---|---|---|---|---|---|---|
| Drake † | 17 | – | 3 | .850 | 31 | – | 4 | .886 |
| Bradley | 15 | – | 5 | .750 | 28 | – | 9 | .757 |
| Northern Iowa | 14 | – | 6 | .700 | 20 | – | 13 | .606 |
| Belmont | 13 | – | 7 | .650 | 22 | – | 11 | .667 |
| Illinois State | 10 | – | 10 | .500 | 22 | – | 14 | .611 |
| UIC | 10 | – | 10 | .500 | 17 | – | 14 | .548 |
| Murray State | 9 | – | 11 | .450 | 16 | – | 17 | .485 |
| Southern Illinois | 8 | – | 12 | .400 | 14 | – | 19 | .424 |
| Indiana State | 8 | – | 12 | .400 | 14 | – | 18 | .438 |
| Evansville | 8 | – | 12 | .400 | 11 | – | 21 | .344 |
| Valparaiso | 6 | – | 14 | .300 | 15 | – | 19 | .441 |
| Missouri State | 2 | – | 18 | .100 | 9 | – | 23 | .281 |
† 2025 MVC tournament winner

The 2024–25 Missouri State Bears basketball team represented Missouri State University during the 2024–25 NCAA Division I men's basketball season. The Bears, led by head coach Cuonzo Martin in his first season in his second stint, and his fourth overall, played their home games at the Great Southern Bank Arena located in Springfield, Missouri as members of the Missouri Valley Conference.

== Previous season ==
The Bears finished the 2023–24 season 17–16, 8–12 in MVC play to finish in ninth place. They defeated Murray State, before falling to top-seeded Indiana State in the quarterfinals of the MVC tournament.

On March 10, 2024, the school announced that they would be firing head coach Dana Ford, ending his six-year tenure with the team. On March 27, the school announced that former Missouri head coach Cuonzo Martin would be returning as head coach, having held the position from 2008 to 2011.

== Roster ==
2024–25 Missouri State Bears men's basketball team
Players
Coaches

| Pos. | # | Name | Height | Weight | Year | Previous school | Hometown |
|---|---|---|---|---|---|---|---|
| G | 0 | Mozae Downing-Rivers | 6 ft 6 in (1.98 m) | 215 lb (98 kg) | Jr | Barton CC | Lawrence, Kansas |
| G | 1 | Vincent Brady II | 6 ft 3 in (1.91 m) | 195 lb (88 kg) | Jr | IU Indy | Indianapolis, Indiana |
| G | 2 | Dez White | 6 ft 2 in (1.88 m) | 180 lb (82 kg) | So | Austin Peay | Jefferson City, Missouri |
| G | 3 | Makhai Valentine | 6 ft 3 in (1.91 m) | 190 lb (86 kg) | Fr | Steel Valley HS | Munhall, Pennsylvania |
| G | 5 | Tommy Pinegar | 6 ft 2 in (1.88 m) | 175 lb (79 kg) | So | Greenwood Laboratory School | Springfield, Missouri |
| G | 6 | Logan Epes | 6 ft 3 in (1.91 m) | 195 lb (88 kg) | Jr | Midwestern State | Garland, Texas |
| F | 7 | Jurrell Baldwin | 6 ft 7 in (2.01 m) | 200 lb (91 kg) | Fr | Hyde Park Academy HS | Chicago, Illinois |
| F | 8 | Sam Murray II | 6 ft 9 in (2.06 m) | 210 lb (95 kg) | Jr | Murray State | Gulfport, Mississippi |
| F | 9 | Wesley Oba | 6 ft 8 in (2.03 m) | 215 lb (98 kg) | Sr | Delaware State | Manchester, England |
| G | 10 | Iago Stanback | 6 ft 3 in (1.91 m) | 180 lb (82 kg) | Fr | Palmetto Ridge HS | Naples, Florida |
| G | 11 | Chase Martin | 6 ft 2 in (1.88 m) | 190 lb (86 kg) | Sr | Purdue | Columbia, Missouri |
| G | 12 | Jalen Hampton | 6 ft 7 in (2.01 m) | 200 lb (91 kg) | Jr | South Plains College | St. Louis, Missouri |
| G | 13 | Zaxton King | 6 ft 3 in (1.91 m) | 185 lb (84 kg) | Fr | Lawrence HS | Lawrence, Kansas |
| G | 20 | C.J. Gaines | 5 ft 8 in (1.73 m) | 155 lb (70 kg) | Fr | Calvary Day School | Savannah, Georgia |
| G | 21 | Nick Kramer | 6 ft 3 in (1.91 m) | 200 lb (91 kg) | So | Saint Louis | St. Louis, Missouri |
| F | 23 | Michael Osei-Bonsu | 6 ft 4 in (1.93 m) | 280 lb (127 kg) | Jr | Vincennes | Bolingbrook, Illinois |
| F | 24 | Allen Udemadu | 6 ft 10 in (2.08 m) | 245 lb (111 kg) | Sr | Morgan State | Lagos, Nigeria |

Head coach

- Cuonzo Martin (Purdue)

Assistant coach(es)

- Tarrance Crump (Purdue)
- Dr. Carson Cunningham (Purdue)
- Marco Harris (Southwestern Oklahoma State)
- Steve Woodberry (Kansas)

Legend

- (C) Team captain
- (S) Suspended
- (I) Ineligible
- (W) Walk-on
- Injured
- Current redshirt

Roster
Last update: November 22, 2024

== Schedule and results ==
| Date time, TV | Rank^{#} | Opponent^{#} | Result | Record | Site (attendance) city, state |
Exhibition Season
| October 29, 2024*; 7:00 pm | | Southwest Baptist | W 72–65 | – | Great Southern Bank Arena (2,483); Springfield, MO |
Regular Season
| November 4, 2024*; 5:45 pm, FS1 | | at Butler | L 65–72 | 0–1 | Hinkle Fieldhouse (7,887); Indianapolis, IN |
| November 11, 2024*; 7:00 pm, ESPN+ | | Missouri Southern | W 90–61 | 1–1 | Great Southern Bank Arena (2,189); Springfield, MO |
| November 16, 2024*; 1:00 pm, ESPN+ | | Tulsa | W 111–106 ^{3OT} | 2–1 | Great Southern Bank Arena (2,364); Springfield, MO |
| November 19, 2024*; 7:00 pm, ESPN+ | | UT Arlington | W 78–68 | 3–1 | Great Southern Bank Arena (2,178); Springfield, MO |
| November 24, 2024*; 4:00 pm, FloHoops | | vs. High Point; Cayman Islands Classic Quarterfinal | W 71–61 | 4–1 | John Gray Gymnasium; George Town, Cayman Islands |
| November 25, 2024*; 6:30 pm, FloHoops | | vs. Boston College; Cayman Islands Classic Semifinal | L 74–76 ^{OT} | 4–2 | John Gray Gymnasium (915); George Town, Cayman Islands |
| November 26, 2024*; 4:00 pm, FloHoops | | vs. South Dakota State; Cayman Islands Classic Third Place | L 55–75 | 4–3 | John Gray Gymnasium (920); George Town, Cayman Islands |
| December 1, 2024*; 3:00 pm, Summit League Network | | at Oral Roberts | W 72–67 | 5–3 | Mabee Center (3,368); Tulsa, OK |
| December 7, 2024; 7:00 pm, ESPN+ | | Indiana State | L 77–80 | 5–4 (0–1) | Great Southern Bank Arena (2,357); Springfield, MO |
| December 14, 2024*; 4:00 pm, ESPN+ | | at Washington State | L 78–91 | 5–5 | Beasley Coliseum (3,304); Pullman, WA |
| December 18, 2024*; 7:00 pm, ESPN+ | | Lincoln (MO) | W 61–49 | 6–5 | Great Southern Bank Arena (1,324); Springfield, MO |
| December 22, 2024*; 1:00 pm, ESPN+ | | UC Santa Barbara | W 68–56 | 7–5 | Great Southern Bank Arena (1,762); Springfield, MO |
| December 29, 2024; 3:00 pm, ESPN+ | | at Evansville | L 40–57 | 7–6 (0–2) | Ford Center (5,128); Evansville, IN |
| January 1, 2025; 7:00 pm, ESPN+ | | Valparaiso | L 72–73 | 7–7 (0–3) | Great Southern Bank Arena (2,013); Springfield, MO |
| January 4, 2025; 7:00 pm, CBSSN | | at Bradley | L 60–69 | 7–8 (0–4) | Carver Arena (5,816); Peoria, IL |
| January 7, 2025; 7:00 pm, ESPN+ | | UIC | L 63–80 | 7–9 (0–5) | Great Southern Bank Arena (1,406); Springfield, MO |
| January 11, 2025; 6:00 pm, ESPN+ | | at Southern Illinois | L 78–88 ^{OT} | 7–10 (0–6) | Banterra Center (4,312); Carbondale, IL |
| January 15, 2025; 6:00 pm, MVC TV Network | | Southern Illinois | L 51–73 | 7–11 (0–7) | Great Southern Bank Arena (3,026); Springfield, MO |
| January 18, 2025; 4:00 pm, ESPN+ | | at Illinois State | L 68–74 | 7–12 (0–8) | CEFCU Arena (4,588); Normal, IL |
| January 21, 2025; 7:00 pm, ESPN+ | | at Northern Iowa | L 68–79 | 7–13 (0–9) | McLeod Center (3,491); Cedar Falls, IA |
| January 25, 2025; 3:00 pm, ESPN+ | | Drake | L 62–69 ^{OT} | 7–14 (0–10) | Great Southern Bank Arena (3,210); Springfield, MO |
| January 29, 2025; 6:00 pm, ESPN+ | | at Indiana State | L 67–72 | 7–15 (0–11) | Hulman Center (4,332); Terre Haute, IN |
| February 1, 2025; 2:00 pm, ESPN+ | | Murray State | W 77–56 | 8–15 (1–11) | Great Southern Bank Arena (2,468); Springfield, MO |
| February 5, 2025; 6:00 pm, MVC TV Network | | Northern Iowa | L 61–66 | 8–16 (1–12) | Great Southern Bank Arena (2,011); Springfield, MO |
| February 8, 2025; 4:00 pm, ESPN+ | | at Belmont | L 68–85 | 8–17 (1–13) | Curb Event Center (2,210); Nashville, TN |
| February 12, 2025; 7:00 pm, ESPN+ | | Evansville | W 71–54 | 9–17 (2–13) | Great Southern Bank Arena (1,438); Springfield, MO |
| February 16, 2025; 2:00 pm, ESPN+ | | at UIC | L 58–63 | 9–18 (2–14) | Credit Union 1 Arena (875); Chicago, IL |
| February 19, 2025; 7:00 pm, ESPN+ | | at Valparaiso | L 64–66 | 9–19 (2–15) | Athletics–Recreation Center (1,267); Valparaiso, IN |
| February 22, 2025; 7:00 pm, ESPN+ | | Illinois State | L 68–70 | 9–20 (2–16) | Great Southern Bank Arena (1,853); Springfield, MO |
| February 26, 2025; 7:00 pm, ESPN+ | | Belmont | L 65–74 | 9–21 (2–17) | Great Southern Bank Arena (1,683); Springfield, MO |
| March 2, 2025; 2:00 pm, ESPN+ | | at Drake | L 60–68 ^{OT} | 9–22 (2–18) | The Knapp Center (5,122); Des Moines, IA |
MVC Tournament
| March 6, 2025; 2:30 pm, MVC TV Network | (12) | vs. (5) Illinois State; Arch Madness Opening Round | L 54–70 | 9–23 | Enterprise Center (4,402); St. Louis, MO |
*Non-conference game. ^{#}Rankings from AP Poll. (#) Tournament seedings in parentheses. All times are in Central.
