= 2024–25 Murray State Racers men's basketball team =

American college basketball season

2024–25 Murray State Racers men's basketball
- Conference: Missouri Valley Conference
- Record: 16–17 (9–11 MVC)
- Head coach: Steve Prohm (3rd in current stint, 7th overall season)
- Assistant coaches: Cole Christian; Antwon Jackson; Brendan Mullins; Bryan Sherrer; T. J. Sapp
- Home arena: CFSB Center

2024–25 Missouri Valley Conference men's basketball standings
	Conf.				Overall
Team	W		L	PCT	W		L	PCT
Drake †	17	–	3	.850	31	–	4	.886
Bradley	15	–	5	.750	28	–	9	.757
Northern Iowa	14	–	6	.700	20	–	13	.606
Belmont	13	–	7	.650	22	–	11	.667
Illinois State	10	–	10	.500	22	–	14	.611
UIC	10	–	10	.500	17	–	14	.548
Murray State	9	–	11	.450	16	–	17	.485
Southern Illinois	8	–	12	.400	14	–	19	.424
Indiana State	8	–	12	.400	14	–	18	.438
Evansville	8	–	12	.400	11	–	21	.344
Valparaiso	6	–	14	.300	15	–	19	.441
Missouri State	2	–	18	.100	9	–	23	.281
† 2025 MVC tournament winner

The 2024–25 Murray State Racers men's basketball team represented Murray State University during the 2024–25 NCAA Division I men's basketball season. The Racers, led by head coach Steve Prohm in his third season in his second stint (seventh overall), played their home games at the CFSB Center in Murray, Kentucky as third-year members of the Missouri Valley Conference.

== Previous season ==
The Racers finished the 2023–24 season 12–20, 9–11 in MVC play to finish in a tie for seventh place. They were defeated by Missouri State in the opening round of the MVC tournament.

== Roster ==
2024–25 Murray State Racers men's basketball team
Players
Coaches

Pos.	#	Name	Height	Weight	Year	Previous school	Hometown
G	0	Kylen Milton	6 ft 4 in (1.93 m)	195 lb (88 kg)	Sr	Arkansas–Pine Bluff	Monticello, Arkansas
F	2	KyeRon Lindsay	6 ft 8 in (2.03 m)	220 lb (100 kg)	Jr	Texas Tech	Denton, Texas
G	4	Patrick Chew	6 ft 3 in (1.91 m)	185 lb (84 kg)	RS So	Brophy College Prep	Phoenix, Arizona
G	7	AJ Ferguson	6 ft 7 in (2.01 m)	195 lb (88 kg)	Sr	Southern Illinois	Houston, Texas
F	8	John McCrear	6 ft 8 in (2.03 m)	205 lb (93 kg)	RS Fr	Woodford County High School	Detroit, Michigan
G	9	Terence Harcum	6 ft 3 in (1.91 m)	205 lb (93 kg)	Sr	Appalachian State	Butner, North Carolina
G	11	Justin Morgan	6 ft 6 in (1.98 m)	210 lb (95 kg)	Jr	Memphis Home School Association	Memphis, Tennessee
F	13	Alden Applewhite	6 ft 7 in (2.01 m)	210 lb (95 kg)	Jr	Portland	Memphis, Tennessee
G	14	Trey Boggess	6 ft 4 in (1.93 m)	190 lb (86 kg)	Fr	Murray High School	Murray, Kentucky
F	17	Chiang Ring	6 ft 8 in (2.03 m)	—	Fr	Park Center High School	Minneapolis, Minnesota
F	23	Nick Ellington	6 ft 7 in (2.01 m)	235 lb (107 kg)	Sr	Eastern Illinois	St. Louis, Missouri
G	24	JaCobi Wood	6 ft 2 in (1.88 m)	190 lb (86 kg)	Sr	Belmont	Cleveland, Tennessee
G	33	Mason Shubert	6 ft 2 in (1.88 m)	175 lb (79 kg)	Fr	Central Community High School	Aviston, Illinois
G	34	Tre Davis	6 ft 0 in (1.83 m)	180 lb (82 kg)	Fr	Houston High School	Memphis, Tennessee
F	35	Jordan McCullum	6 ft 8 in (2.03 m)	180 lb (82 kg)	Fr	Harriman High School	Harriman, Tennessee

Head coach

- Steve Prohm (Alabama)

Assistant coach(es)

- Cole Christian (Iowa State)
- Antwon Jackson (Pikeville)
- Brendan Mullins (Saint Michael's)
- Bryan Sherrer (South Alabama)
- T. J. Sapp (Murray State)

Legend

- (C) Team captain
- (S) Suspended
- (I) Ineligible
- (W) Walk-on
- Injured
- Current redshirt

Roster
Last update: November 22, 2024

== Schedule and results ==
Date time, TV	Rank^{#}	Opponent^{#}	Result	Record	Site (attendance) city, state
Regular season
November 4, 2024*; 7:00 pm, ESPN+		Bethel (TN)	W 113–37	1–0	CFSB Center (4,568); Murray, KY
November 8, 2024*; 6:00 pm, ACCNX/ESPN+		at Pittsburgh	L 68–83	1–1	Petersen Events Center (7,537); Pittsburgh, PA
November 16, 2024*; 3:00 pm, ESPN+		at Middle Tennessee	W 88–67	2–1	Murphy Center (3,812); Murfreesboro, TN
November 20, 2024*; 7:00 pm, ESPN+		Maryland Eastern Shore	W 79–61	3–1	CFSB Center (4,731); Murray, KY
November 22, 2024*; 7:00 pm, ESPN+		Utah Valley	L 75–77	3–2	CFSB Center (5,037); Murray, KY
November 26, 2024*; 4:00 pm		vs. UT Arlington	W 79–66	4–2	The Reef (121); Jacksonville, FL
December 3, 2024; 7:00 pm, MVC TV Network/ESPN+		Evansville	W 63–61	5–2 (1–0)	CFSB Center (5,358); Murray, KY
December 8, 2024*; 3:00 pm, ESPN+		Southeast Missouri State	W 73–53	6–2	CFSB Center (4,795); Murray, KY
December 14, 2024*; 1:00 pm, ESPN+		at Western Kentucky	L 76–81 ^{OT}	6–3	E. A. Diddle Arena (3,707); Bowling Green, KY
December 18, 2024; 6:00 pm, MVC TV Network/ESPN+		at Indiana State	L 74–84	6–4 (1–1)	Hulman Center (4,132); Terre Haute, IN
December 22, 2024*; 8:00 pm, ESPN		vs. Nebraska; Hawaiian Airlines Diamond Head Classic Quarterfinal	L 49–66	6–5	Stan Sheriff Center (5,049); Honolulu, HI
December 23, 2024*; 11:30 pm, ESPN2		vs. Charlotte; Hawaiian Airlines Diamond Head Classic Consolation Semifinal	L 90–94 ^{2OT}	6–6	Stan Sheriff Center (4,611); Honolulu, HI
December 25, 2024*; 12:30 pm, ESPNU		vs. Loyola Chicago; Hawaiian Airlines Diamond Head Classic Seventh Place	W 71–68	7–6	Stan Sheriff Center (4,163); Honolulu, HI
January 2, 2025; 7:00 pm, ESPN+		Illinois State	L 68–74	7–7 (1–2)	CFSB Center (4,585); Murray, KY
January 5, 2025; 2:00 pm, ESPN2		at Drake	W 66–59	8–7 (2–2)	The Knapp Center (3,807); Des Moines, IA
January 8, 2025; 6:00 pm, MVC TV Network/ESPN+		at Northern Iowa	W 71–68	9–7 (3–2)	McLeod Center (3,249); Cedar Falls, IA
January 11, 2025; 3:00 pm, ESPN+		Valparaiso	W 58–47	10–7 (4–2)	CFSB Center (5,418); Murray, KY
January 15, 2025; 7:00 pm, ESPN+		at UIC	L 93–97 ^{2OT}	10–8 (4–3)	Credit Union 1 Arena (1,391); Chicago, IL
January 18, 2025; 3:00 pm, ESPN+		Bradley	L 61–74	10–9 (4–4)	CFSB Center (5,594); Murray, KY
January 22, 2025; 6:00 pm, MVC TV Network/ESPN+		at Southern Illinois	W 74–64	11–9 (5–4)	Banterra Center (5,506); Carbondale, IL
January 25, 2025; 3:00 pm, ESPN+		Belmont	L 77–95	11–10 (5–5)	CFSB Center (5,706); Murray, KY
January 29, 2025; 7:00 pm, ESPN+		at Evansville	L 74–78	11–11 (5–6)	Ford Center (5,318); Evansville, IN
February 1, 2025; 2:00 pm, ESPN+		at Missouri State	L 56–77	11–12 (5–7)	Great Southern Bank Arena (2,468); Springfield, MO
February 4, 2025; 6:00 pm, ESPN2		Drake	L 45–55	11–13 (5–8)	CFSB Center (4,586); Murray, KY
February 8, 2025; 3:00 pm, ESPN+		at Valparaiso	W 74–56	12–13 (6–8)	Athletics–Recreation Center (1,401); Valparaiso, IN
February 11, 2025; 7:00 pm, ESPN+		UIC	W 63–53	13–13 (7–8)	CFSB Center (4,874); Murray, KY
February 17, 2025; 6:00 pm, ESPN+		vs. Northern Iowa; Game rescheduled due to power outage caused by inclement weather	L 67–74	13–14 (7–9)	Curb Event Center (472); Nashville, TN
February 19, 2025; 6:00 pm, ESPN+		at Southern Illinois; Game relocated due to power outage caused by inclement weather	W 62–60	14–14 (8–9)	Banterra Center (1,030); Carbondale, IL
February 22, 2025; 5:00 pm, ESPNU		at Bradley	L 83–85 ^{OT}	14–15 (8–10)	Carver Arena (7,560); Peoria, IL
February 25, 2025; 7:00 pm, ESPN+		Indiana State	W 85–75	15–15 (9–10)	CFSB Center (4,683); Murray, KY
March 2, 2025; 2:00 pm, CBSSN		at Belmont	L 60–70	15–16 (9–11)	Curb Event Center (2,051); Nashville, TN
MVC tournament
March 6, 2025; 6:00 pm, MVC TV Network/ESPN+	(7)	vs. (10) Evansville; Opening Round	W 74–53	16–16	Enterprise Center (3,849); St. Louis, MO
March 7, 2025; 6:00 pm, MVC TV Network/ESPN+	(7)	vs. (2) Bradley; Quarterfinal	L 62–70	16–17	Enterprise Center (6,090); St. Louis, MO
*Non-conference game. ^{#}Rankings from AP Poll. (#) Tournament seedings in parentheses. All times are in Central.
