= All Wright =

Mexican basketball player (born 2005)

No. 3 – Loyola Marymount Lions
- Position: Guard
- League: West Coast Conference

Personal information
- Born: March 29, 2005 (age 21) Durango, Mexico
- Listed height: 6 ft 3 in (1.91 m)
- Listed weight: 190 lb (86 kg)

Career information
- High school: Joplin (Joplin, Missouri); Link Academy (Branson, Missouri)
- College: Valparaiso (2024–25); Xavier (2025–26); Loyola Marymount (2026–present)

Career highlights
- MVC Freshman of the Year (2025)

Andre All Wright Vargas (born March 29, 2005) is a Mexican college basketball player for the Loyola Marymount Lions. He previously played for the Valparaiso Beacons and the Xavier Musketeers. Wright represents the Mexico national team internationally.

== Early life ==
Wright was born on March 29, 2005, in Durango, Mexico, the son of Joe Wright, an American ex-professional basketball player, and Karina Vargas, a Durango native. At age two, he moved to Carthage, Missouri.

Wright initially attended Joplin High School in Joplin, Missouri, where he played three seasons of high school basketball. Ahead of his senior year, he transferred to Link Academy in Branson, Missouri, where he averaged 15 points and seven assists per game in his final season. Coming out of high school, Wright was an unranked recruit. He committed to playing college basketball at Valparaiso University for head coach Roger Powell.

== College career ==
Wright made his collegiate debut for Valparaiso on November 4, 2024, recording four points and three assists against Liberty, and made his first start on November 21 versus Lindenwood. He broke the program's single-game freshman scoring record with a 32-point performance in a loss to Indiana State on February 5, 2025. Wright averaged 15.5 points, 2.4 assists, and 2.2 rebounds per game and was named the Missouri Valley Conference (MVC) Freshman of the Year. He also averaged 25 points per game in the 2025 MVC tournament, garnering all-tournament honors. After the season, Wright entered the NCAA transfer portal. He was rated as a four-star transfer recruit by 247Sports. On April 3, 2025, Wright committed to transferring to Xavier University. He signed with the Musketeers several days later.

As a sophomore at Xavier in 2025–26, Wright averaged 7.5 points, two assists, and 1.6 rebounds per game. He scored a season-high 20 points in his first start of the season, a 99–69 win over Old Dominion on November 18, 2025. Wright entered the transfer portal after the season. He was rated a three-star transfer recruit by 247Sports. On April 21, 2026, Wright committed to transferring to Loyola Marymount University. He signed with the Lions soon thereafter.

== National team career ==
Wright debuted with the Mexico senior national team during 2027 FIBA Basketball World Cup Americas Pre-qualifiers in August 2025. He averaged 8.7 points and four assists in three games.

== Personal life ==
Wright's middle name, All, was suggested to his father by a friend. His brother, Always, played college basketball at Northeastern Oklahoma A&M, Rhode Island, and UT Rio Grande Valley.
