= 2024–25 UIC Flames men's basketball team =

American college basketball season

2024–25 UIC Flames men's basketball
- Conference: Missouri Valley Conference
- Record: 17–14 (10–10 MVC)
- Head coach: Rob Ehsan (1st season)
- Associate head coach: Kevin Devitt (1st season)
- Assistant coaches: Johnny Hill (1st season); David Berkun (1st season); Ryan Davis (1st season); Jaime Smith (1st season)
- Home arena: Credit Union 1 Arena

2024–25 Missouri Valley Conference men's basketball standings
	Conf.				Overall
Team	W		L	PCT	W		L	PCT
Drake †	17	–	3	.850	31	–	4	.886
Bradley	15	–	5	.750	28	–	9	.757
Northern Iowa	14	–	6	.700	20	–	13	.606
Belmont	13	–	7	.650	22	–	11	.667
Illinois State	10	–	10	.500	22	–	14	.611
UIC	10	–	10	.500	17	–	14	.548
Murray State	9	–	11	.450	16	–	17	.485
Southern Illinois	8	–	12	.400	14	–	19	.424
Indiana State	8	–	12	.400	14	–	18	.438
Evansville	8	–	12	.400	11	–	21	.344
Valparaiso	6	–	14	.300	15	–	19	.441
Missouri State	2	–	18	.100	9	–	23	.281
† 2025 MVC tournament winner

The 2024–25 UIC Flames men's basketball team represented the University of Illinois Chicago during the 2024–25 NCAA Division I men's basketball season. The Flames, led by first-year head coach Rob Ehsan, played their home games at Credit Union 1 Arena in Chicago, Illinois as members of the Missouri Valley Conference (MVC). The finished the season 17–14, 10–10 in MVC play to finish in a tie for fifth place. As the No. 6 seed in the MVC tournament, they were upset by Valparaiso.

== Previous season ==
The Flames finished the 2023–24 season 12–21, 4–16 in MVC play, to finish in 11th place. They defeated Southern Illinois before losing to Bradley in the quarterfinals of the MVC tournament.

On March 10, 2024, the school announced the firing of head coach Luke Yaklich, ending his four-year tenure at the helm. On April 1, the school announced that Stanford assistant Rob Ehsan would be the team's new coach.

== Offseason ==
=== Departures ===
Departures
Name	Number	Pos.	Height	Weight	Year	Hometown	Reason for departure
Ethyn Brown	10	G	5' 11"	185	Sophomore	Belleville, IL	Transferred to Quincy
Jaden Brownell	33	F	6' 9"	230	RS Sophomore	Sandy, UT	Transferred to Samford
Steven Clay	2	G	6' 4"	185	Sophomore	Milwaukee, WI	Transferred to Morehead State
Cameron Fens	54	C	6' 10"	255	Sophomore	Dubuque, IA	Transferred to South Dakota
CJ Jones	3	G	6' 5"	195	Sophomore	East St. Louis, IL	Transferred to Kansas State
Marquise Kennedy	14	G	6' 1"	190	Graduate student	Chicago, IL	Exhausted eligibility
Drew King	0	G	6' 3"	189	Sophomore	Phoenix, AZ	Transferred to Elon
Nathan Ojukwu	13	F	6' 6"	215	Freshman	Boise, ID	Transferred to Northwest Florida State
Toby Okani	5	G	6' 8"	210	Senior	Orange, NJ	Transferred to West Virginia
Yusef Salih	23	G	6' 2"	192	Junior	Gainesville, VA	Transferred to East Texas A&M
Isaiah Rivera	1	G	6' 5"	210	Senior	Geneseo, IL	Transferred to DePaul
Griffin Yaklich	15	G	6' 6"	210	Senior	Joliet, IL	Transferred to Roosevelt

=== Incoming transfers ===
Incoming transfers
Name	Number	Pos.	Height	Weight	Year	Hometown	Previous school
Ahmad Henderson II	0	G	5' 9"	155	Sophomore	Chicago, IL	Niagara
Jordan Mason	2	G	6' 4"	175	Junior	San Antonio, TX	Texas State
Modestas Kancleris	5	F	6' 9"	205	RS Senior	Kaunas, Lithuania	Cal State Bakersfield
Tyem Freeman	8	G	6' 5"	205	Graduate student	Springfield, MO	Kent State
Koby Jeffries	9	G	6' 3"	195	RS Senior	Olive Branch, MS	UT Martin
Saša Ciani	21	F	6' 9"	240	Sophomore	Nova Gorica, Slovenia	Xavier
Javon Jackson	22	G	6' 3"	190	Junior	Houston, TX	Utah State
Joshua Reaves	23	G	6' 4"	205	Graduate student	Hamden, CT	Mount St. Mary's

=== Recruiting class ===
College recruiting
Name	Hometown	School	Height	Weight	Commit date
Jayce Nathaniel; F	Buford, GA	AZ Compass Prep	6 ft 9 in (2.06 m)	200 lb (91 kg)	
Jayce Nathaniel; F	Recruit ratings: Rivals: 247Sports: ESPN: (N/A)				
Carlos Harris III; G	Chicago, IL	Curie High School	6 ft 2 in (1.88 m)	180 lb (82 kg)	
Carlos Harris III; G	Recruit ratings: Rivals: 247Sports: ESPN: (N/A)				
Iker Garmendia; F	Barcelona, Spain	Joventut Badalona	6 ft 9 in (2.06 m)	190 lb (86 kg)	
Iker Garmendia; F	Recruit ratings: Rivals: 247Sports: ESPN: (N/A)				
Overall recruit ranking:
Note: In many cases, Scout, Rivals, 247Sports, On3, and ESPN may conflict in their listings of height and weight.; In these cases, the average was taken. ESPN grades are on a 100-point scale.; Sources: "2024 Team Ranking". Rivals.

== Roster ==
2024–25 UIC Flames men's basketball team
Players
Coaches

Pos.	#	Name	Height	Weight	Year	Previous school	Hometown
G	0	Ahmad II Henderson	5 ft 9 in (1.75 m)	155 lb (70 kg)	So	Niagara	Chicago, IL
F	1	Jayce Nathaniel	6 ft 9 in (2.06 m)	200 lb (91 kg)	Fr	AZ Compass Prep	Buford, GA
G	2	Jordan Mason	6 ft 4 in (1.93 m)	175 lb (79 kg)	Jr	Texas State	San Antonio, TX
G	3	Carlos III Harris	6 ft 2 in (1.88 m)	180 lb (82 kg)	Fr	Curie High School	Chicago, IL
G	4	Ethan Pickett	6 ft 4 in (1.93 m)	205 lb (93 kg)	Sr	Triton College	Pensacola, FL
F	5	Modestas Kancleris	6 ft 9 in (2.06 m)	205 lb (93 kg)	RS Sr	Cal State Bakersfield	Kaunas, Lithuania
G	6	Khaled Khaled	6 ft 3 in (1.91 m)	180 lb (82 kg)	RS Fr	Reavis High School	Burbank, IL
G	8	Tyem Freeman	6 ft 5 in (1.96 m)	205 lb (93 kg)	GS	Kent State	Springfield, MO
G	9	Koby Jeffries	6 ft 3 in (1.91 m)	195 lb (88 kg)	RS Sr	UT Martin	Olive Branch, MS
F	14	Iker Garmendia	6 ft 9 in (2.06 m)	190 lb (86 kg)	Fr	Joventut Badalona	Barcelona, Spain
F	21	Saša Ciani	6 ft 9 in (2.06 m)	240 lb (109 kg)	So	Xavier	Nova Gorica, Slovenia
G	22	Javon Jackson	6 ft 3 in (1.91 m)	190 lb (86 kg)	Jr	Utah State	Houston, TX
G	23	Joshua Reaves	6 ft 4 in (1.93 m)	205 lb (93 kg)	GS	Mount St. Mary's	Hamden, CT
G	34	Grant Welch	6 ft 3 in (1.91 m)	187 lb (85 kg)	So	Moline High School	Moline, IL
F	50	Filip Skobalj	6 ft 7 in (2.01 m)	235 lb (107 kg)	Sr	Don Bosco-Schule Rostock	Belgrade, Serbia

Head coach

- Rob Ehsan (UC Davis)

Assistant coach(es)

- Kevin Devitt (DePaul)
- Johnny Hill (UT Arlington)
- David Berkun (VCU)
- Ryan Davis (Chicago)
- Jaime Smith (Alabama–Huntsville)

Legend

- (C) Team captain
- (S) Suspended
- (I) Ineligible
- (W) Walk-on
- Injured
- Current redshirt

Roster
Last update: November 24, 2024

== Schedule and results ==
Date time, TV	Rank^{#}	Opponent^{#}	Result	Record	High points	High rebounds	High assists	Site (attendance) city, state
Exhibition season
November 30, 2024*; 4:00 p.m., ESPN+		Aurora	W 91–76		19 – tied	10 – tied	7 – Jackson	Credit Union 1 Arena; Chicago, IL
Regular season
November 4, 2024*; 7:00 p.m., ESPN+		St. Francis (IL)	W 91–43	1–0	21 – Jackson	11 – Kancleris	5 – Henderson II	Credit Union 1 Arena (594); Chicago, IL
November 8, 2024*; 7:00 p.m., ESPN+		Yale	W 91–79	2–0	19 – Freeman	11 – Ciani	7 – Henderson II	Credit Union 1 Arena (3,102); Chicago, IL
November 12, 2024*; 6:00 p.m., BTN		at Northwestern	L 74–83	2–1	17 – Jackson	8 – tied	4 – tied	Welsh–Ryan Arena (5,492); Evanston, IL
November 16, 2024*; 12:00 p.m., ESPN+		Saint Mary's (MN)	W 117–59	3–1	21 – Reaves	9 – Kancleris	10 – Jackson	Credit Union 1 Arena (664); Chicago, IL
November 21, 2024*; 10:00 a.m., BallerTV		vs. James Madison; Boardwalk Battle quarterfinal	L 81–99	3–2	17 – Henderson II	9 – Ciani	4 – Henderson II	Ocean Center (386); Daytona Beach, FL
November 22, 2024*; 10:00 a.m., BallerTV		vs. La Salle; Boardwalk Battle consolation semifinal	W 96–83	4–2	19 – Skobalj	11 – Ciani	4 – Jackson	Ocean Center; Daytona Beach, FL
November 23, 2024*; 12:00 p.m., BallerTV		vs. East Carolina; Boardwalk Battle consolation final	L 55–72	4–3	10 – tied	8 – Ciani	6 – Jackson	Ocean Center; Daytona Beach, FL
December 4, 2024; 7:00 p.m., ESPN+		Northern Iowa	L 56–83	4–4 (0–1)	14 – Jackson	17 – Ciani	3 – Jackson	Credit Union 1 Arena (732); Chicago, IL
December 8, 2024*; 4:00 p.m., ESPN+		Dartmouth	W 69–68 ^{OT}	5–4	17 – tied	13 – Kancleris	4 – Jackson	Credit Union 1 Arena (728); Chicago, IL
December 15, 2024*; 1:00 p.m., ESPN+		at Little Rock	W 77–69 ^{OT}	6–4	15 – tied	13 – Kancleris	5 – Mason	Jack Stephens Center (602); Little Rock, AR
December 20, 2024*; 4:00 p.m., ESPN+		at Seattle	W 79–68	7–4	14 – Henderson II	7 – Kancleris	9 – Henderson II	Redhawk Center (852); Seattle, WA
December 29, 2024; 4:00 p.m., Marquee/ESPN+		at Illinois State	W 73–67	8–4 (1–1)	16 – Ciani	9 – Ciani	4 – Henderson II	CEFCU Arena (3,841); Normal, IL
January 1, 2025; 2:00 p.m., ESPN+		Drake	W 74–70	9–4 (2–1)	17 – Mason	5 – Ciani	5 – Mason	Credit Union 1 Arena (1,200); Chicago, IL
January 4, 2025; 4:00 p.m., ESPN+		at Belmont	L 87–92	9–5 (2–2)	18 – Henderson II	8 – Jackson	5 – Mason	Curb Event Center (1,200); Nashville, TN
January 7, 2025; 7:00 p.m., ESPN+		at Missouri State	W 80–63	10–5 (3–2)	18 – Freeman	5 – Freeman	6 – Ciani	Great Southern Bank Arena (1,406); Springfield, MO
January 11, 2025; 2:00 p.m., ESPN+		Bradley	L 60–61	10–6 (3–3)	15 – Mason	11 – Ciani	4 – Henderson II	Credit Union 1 Arena (1,896); Chicago, IL
January 15, 2025; 7:00 p.m., ESPN+		Murray State	W 97–93 ^{2OT}	11–6 (4–3)	30 – Jackson	10 – Ciani	5 – tied	Credit Union 1 Arena (1,391); Chicago, IL
January 18, 2025; 1:00 p.m., ESPN+		at Valparaiso	W 81–74	12–6 (5–3)	17 – Jackson	12 – Ciani	4 – Freeman	Athletics–Recreation Center (1,456); Valparaiso, IN
January 22, 2025; 7:00 p.m., ESPN+		at Evansville	W 78–67	13–6 (6–3)	19 – Mason	9 – Kancleris	5 – Mason	Ford Center (3,987); Evansville, IN
January 25, 2025; 2:00 p.m., ESPN+		Southern Illinois	L 85–89	13–7 (6–4)	23 – Mason	6 – Freeman	7 – Mason	Credit Union 1 Arena (2,326); Chicago, IL
January 29, 2025; 7:00 p.m., ESPN+		at Bradley	W 93–70	14–7 (7–4)	25 – Jackson	9 – Kancleris	7 – Mason	Carver Arena (5,785); Peoria, IL
February 1, 2025; 2:00 p.m., ESPN+		Indiana State	L 83–88	14–8 (7–5)	20 – tied	10 – Kancleris	6 – Mason	Credit Union 1 Arena (1,352); Chicago, IL
February 5, 2025; 7:00 p.m., ESPN+		Illinois State	L 79–81	14–9 (7–6)	18 – Freeman	7 – Pickett	5 – Jackson	Credit Union 1 Arena (1,554); Chicago, IL
February 8, 2025; 1:00 p.m., ESPN+		at Southern Illinois	L 67–79	14–10 (7–7)	12 – tied	5 – Freeman	2 – tied	Banterra Center (4,321); Carbondale, IL
February 11, 2025; 7:00 p.m., ESPN+		at Murray State	L 53–63	14–11 (7–8)	12 – Kancleris	10 – Kancleris	3 – Mason	CFSB Center (4,874); Murray, KY
February 16, 2025; 2:00 p.m., ESPN+		Missouri State	W 63–58	15–11 (8–8)	16 – Jackson	8 – Kancleris	2 – tied	Credit Union 1 Arena (875); Chicago, IL
February 19, 2025; 6:30 p.m., ESPN+		at Drake	L 57–74	15–12 (8–9)	15 – Freeman	6 – tied	3 – Jackson	The Knapp Center (3,449); Des Moines, IA
February 22, 2025; 2:00 p.m., ESPN+		Evansville	W 82–77	16–12 (9–9)	18 – Kancleris	10 – Kancleris	9 – Mason	Credit Union 1 Arena (994); Chicago, IL
February 26, 2025; 6:00 p.m., MVC TV Network/ESPN+		at Northern Iowa	L 52–74	16–13 (9–10)	13 – Henderson II	6 – Ciani	2 – tied	McLeod Center (4,098); Cedar Falls, IA
March 2, 2025; 2:00 p.m., ESPN+		Valparaiso	W 77–73	17–13 (10–10)	17 – Henderson II	13 – Kancleris	4 – Freeman	Credit Union 1 Arena (1,200); Chicago, IL
State Farm MVC tournament
March 6, 2025*; 8:30 p.m., MVC TV Network/ESPN+	(6)	vs. (11) Valparaiso; Arch Madness Opening Round	L 50–67	17–14	11 – Pickett	6 – tied	3 – Khaled	Enterprise Center (3,849); St. Louis, MO
*Non-conference game. ^{#}Rankings from AP poll. (#) Tournament seedings in parentheses. All times are in Central.
