= 2024–25 Southern Illinois Salukis men's basketball team =

American college basketball season

2024–25 Southern Illinois Salukis men's basketball
- Conference: Missouri Valley Conference
- Record: 14–19 (8–12 MVC)
- Head coach: Scott Nagy (1st season)
- Assistant coaches: Steve Hawkins; Jevon Mamon; Will Veasley
- Home arena: Banterra Center

2024–25 Missouri Valley Conference men's basketball standings
	Conf.				Overall
Team	W		L	PCT	W		L	PCT
Drake †	17	–	3	.850	31	–	4	.886
Bradley	15	–	5	.750	28	–	9	.757
Northern Iowa	14	–	6	.700	20	–	13	.606
Belmont	13	–	7	.650	22	–	11	.667
Illinois State	10	–	10	.500	22	–	14	.611
UIC	10	–	10	.500	17	–	14	.548
Murray State	9	–	11	.450	16	–	17	.485
Southern Illinois	8	–	12	.400	14	–	19	.424
Indiana State	8	–	12	.400	14	–	18	.438
Evansville	8	–	12	.400	11	–	21	.344
Valparaiso	6	–	14	.300	15	–	19	.441
Missouri State	2	–	18	.100	9	–	23	.281
† 2025 MVC tournament winner

The 2024–25 Southern Illinois Salukis men's basketball team represented Southern Illinois University Carbondale during the 2024–25 NCAA Division I men's basketball season. The Salukis, led by first-year head coach Scott Nagy, played their home games at the Banterra Center in Carbondale, Illinois as members of the Missouri Valley Conference (MVC).

== Previous season ==
The Salukis finished the 2023–24 season 19–13, 11–9 in MVC play to finish in sixth place. They were upset in the first round of the MVC tournament by UIC.

Following the season, the school fired head coach Bryan Mullins. On March 28, 2024, the school named Wright State head coach Scott Nagy the team's new head coach.

== Roster ==
2024–25 Southern Illinois Salukis men's basketball team
Players
Coaches

Pos.	#	Name	Height	Weight	Year	Previous school	Hometown
F	0	Rolyns Aligbe	6 ft 9 in (2.06 m)	240 lb (109 kg)	Fr	Minnehaha Academy	Minneapolis, MN
G	1	Elijah Elliott	6 ft 1 in (1.85 m)	175 lb (79 kg)	Sr	UT Rio Grande Valley	Houston, TX
G	4	Davion Sykes	6 ft 6 in (1.98 m)	220 lb (100 kg)	Jr	Texas State	Duncanville, TX
G	5	Sheridan Sharp	6 ft 3 in (1.91 m)	165 lb (75 kg)	So	Ben Davis High School	Indianapolis, IN
G	6	Ali Dibba	6 ft 5 in (1.96 m)	205 lb (93 kg)	Sr	Abilene Christian	Stockholm, Sweden
G	10	Damien Mayo Jr.	6 ft 3 in (1.91 m)	210 lb (95 kg)	Jr	Missouri State	St. Louis, MO
G	11	Tyler Bey	6 ft 9 in (2.06 m)	190 lb (86 kg)	So	Missouri State	Newark, NJ
G	15	Issac Billington (W)	6 ft 1 in (1.85 m)	175 lb (79 kg)	Fr	Benton Consolidated High School	Benton, IL
G	21	Drew Steffe	6 ft 5 in (1.96 m)	200 lb (91 kg)	RS Fr	Texas Tech	Frisco, TX
F	25	Jorge Moreno	6 ft 11 in (2.11 m)	270 lb (122 kg)	RS Jr	Lee College	Cananea, Mexico
G	30	Kennard Davis	6 ft 6 in (1.98 m)	215 lb (98 kg)	So	Vashon High School	St. Louis, MO
F	32	Jarrett Hensley	6 ft 8 in (2.03 m)	215 lb (98 kg)	Sr	Cincinnati	Merriam, KS
C	33	Jaheem Webber	6 ft 10 in (2.08 m)	255 lb (116 kg)	Fr	Normal Community High School	Normal, IL
F	45	Antwaun Massey	6 ft 6 in (1.98 m)	200 lb (91 kg)	Jr	New Mexico Junior College	Olathe, KS

Head coach

- Scott Nagy (Delta State)

Assistant coach(es)

- Steve Hawkins (USSA)
- Jevon Mamon (Barat College)
- Will Veasley (Butler)

Legend

- (C) Team captain
- (S) Suspended
- (I) Ineligible
- (W) Walk-on
- Injured
- Current redshirt

Roster
Last update: October 29, 2024

== Schedule and results ==
Date time, TV	Rank^{#}	Opponent^{#}	Result	Record	Site city, state
Exhibition Season
October 29, 2024*; 6:00 p.m.		North Park	W 106–71		Banterra Center; Carbondale, IL
Regular Season
November 4, 2024*; 11:00 a.m., YouTube		vs. Charleston; Field of 68; Opening Day Showcase	L 80–90	0–1	Sanford Pentagon (2,878); Sioux Falls, SD
November 8, 2024*; 7:00 p.m., ESPN+		Missouri S&T	W 86–64	1–1	Banterra Center (4,930); Carbondale, IL
November 14, 2024*; 7:00 p.m., ESPN+		at Oklahoma State	L 78–85	1–2	Gallagher-Iba Arena (5,804); Stillwater, OK
November 18, 2024*; 7:00 p.m., ESPN+		North Dakota State	W 69–44	2–2	Banterra Center (4,553); Carbondale, IL
November 22, 2024*; 6:00 p.m., SEC Network		at No. 21 Florida	L 68–93	2–3	O'Connell Center (9,533); Gainesville, FL
November 25, 2024*; 2:00 p.m., FloHoops		vs. Louisiana Tech; Gulf Coast Showcase	L 79–85 ^{OT}	2–4	Hertz Arena (613); Estero, FL
November 26, 2024*; 11:00 a.m., FloHoops		vs. Eastern Kentucky; Gulf Coast Showcase	L 72–77	2–5	Hertz Arena (377); Estero, FL
November 27, 2024*; 2:00 p.m., FloHoops		vs. Florida Tech; Gulf Coast Showcase	W 81–54	3–5	Hertz Arena (213); Estero, FL
December 3, 2024; 7:00 p.m., ESPN+		Bradley	L 60–83	3–6 (0–1)	Banterra Center (4,332); Carbondale, IL
December 7, 2024*; 2:00 p.m., ESPN+		Southern Indiana	W 73–70	4–6	Banterra Center (4,121); Carbondale, IL
December 14, 2024*; 4:00 p.m., ESPN+		at Austin Peay	W 65–60	5–6	F&M Bank Arena (1,727); Clarksville, TN
December 21, 2024*; 1:00 p.m., ESPN+		High Point	L 81–94	5–7	Banterra Center (4,344); Carbondale, IL
December 29, 2024; 1:00 p.m., ESPN+		at Northern Iowa	L 67–78	5–8 (0–2)	McLeod Center (3,804); Cedar Falls, IA
January 1, 2025; 1:00 p.m., ESPN+		Evansville	L 53–68	5–9 (0–3)	Banterra Center (6,030); Carbondale, IL
January 5, 2025; 3:00 p.m., ESPN+		at Illinois State	L 54–85	5–10 (0–4)	CEFCU Arena (3,427); Normal, IL
January 8, 2025; 6:30 p.m., ESPN+		at Belmont	L 86–90	5–11 (0–5)	Curb Event Center (1,504); Nashville, TN
January 11, 2025; 6:00 p.m., ESPN+		Missouri State	W 88–78 ^{OT}	6–11 (1–5)	Banterra Center (4,312); Carbondale, IL
January 15, 2025; 6:00 p.m., MVC TV Network/ESPN+		at Missouri State	W 73–51	7–11 (2–5)	Great Southern Bank Arena (3,026); Springfield, MO
January 18, 2025; 6:00 p.m., ESPN+		Northern Iowa	W 73–49	8–11 (3–5)	Banterra Center (4,230); Carbondale, IL
January 22, 2025; 6:00 p.m., MVC TV Network/ESPN+		Murray State	L 64–74	8–12 (3–6)	Banterra Center (5,506); Carbondale, IL
January 25, 2025; 2:00 p.m., ESPN+		at Illinois Chicago	W 89–85	9–12 (4–6)	Credit Union 1 Arena (2,326); Chicago, IL
January 28, 2025; 7:00 p.m., ESPN+		at Valparaiso	W 79–75	10–12 (5–6)	Athletics–Recreation Center (1,113); Valparaiso, IN
February 1, 2025; 1:00 p.m., ESPNU		Drake	L 65–75	10–13 (5–7)	Banterra Center (4,306); Carbondale, IL
February 5, 2025; 7:00 p.m., ESPN+		at Evansville	W 68–59	11–13 (6–7)	Ford Center (4,435); Evansville, IN
February 8, 2025; 1:00 p.m., ESPN+		Illinois Chicago	W 79–67	12–13 (7–7)	Banterra Center (4,321); Carbondale, IL
February 12, 2025; 6:00 p.m., MVC TV Network/ESPN+		at Bradley	L 64–78	12–14 (7–8)	Carver Arena (5,183); Peoria, IL
February 15, 2025; 6:00 p.m., ESPN+		Belmont	L 68–73	12–15 (7–9)	Banterra Center (4,304); Carbondale, IL
February 19, 2025; 6:00 p.m., ESPN+		Murray State; Game relocated due to power outage caused by inclement weather	L 60–62	12–16 (7–10)	Banterra Center (1,030); Carbondale, IL
February 22, 2025; 6:00 p.m., ESPN+		Valparaiso	L 79–83	12–17 (7–11)	Banterra Center (4,203); Carbondale, IL
February 25, 2025; 7:00 p.m., ESPN+		Illinois State	W 88–79	13–17 (8–11)	Banterra Center (4,141); Carbondale, IL
March 2, 2025; 12:00 p.m., ESPN+		at Indiana State	L 77–95	13–18 (8–12)	Hulman Center (4,892); Terre Haute, IN
Conference Tournament
March 6, 2025; 12:00 p.m., MVC TV Network/ESPN+	(8)	vs. (9) Indiana State; Arch Madness Opening Round	W 86–85	14–18	Enterprise Center (4,402); St. Louis, MO
March 7, 2025; 12:00 p.m., MVC TV Network/ESPN+	(8)	vs. (1) Drake; Arch Madness Quarterfinal	L 53–70	14–19	Enterprise Center (6,005); St. Louis, MO
*Non-conference game. ^{#}Rankings from AP poll. (#) Tournament seedings in parentheses. All times are in Central.
