= Bennett Stirtz =

American basketball player (born 2003)

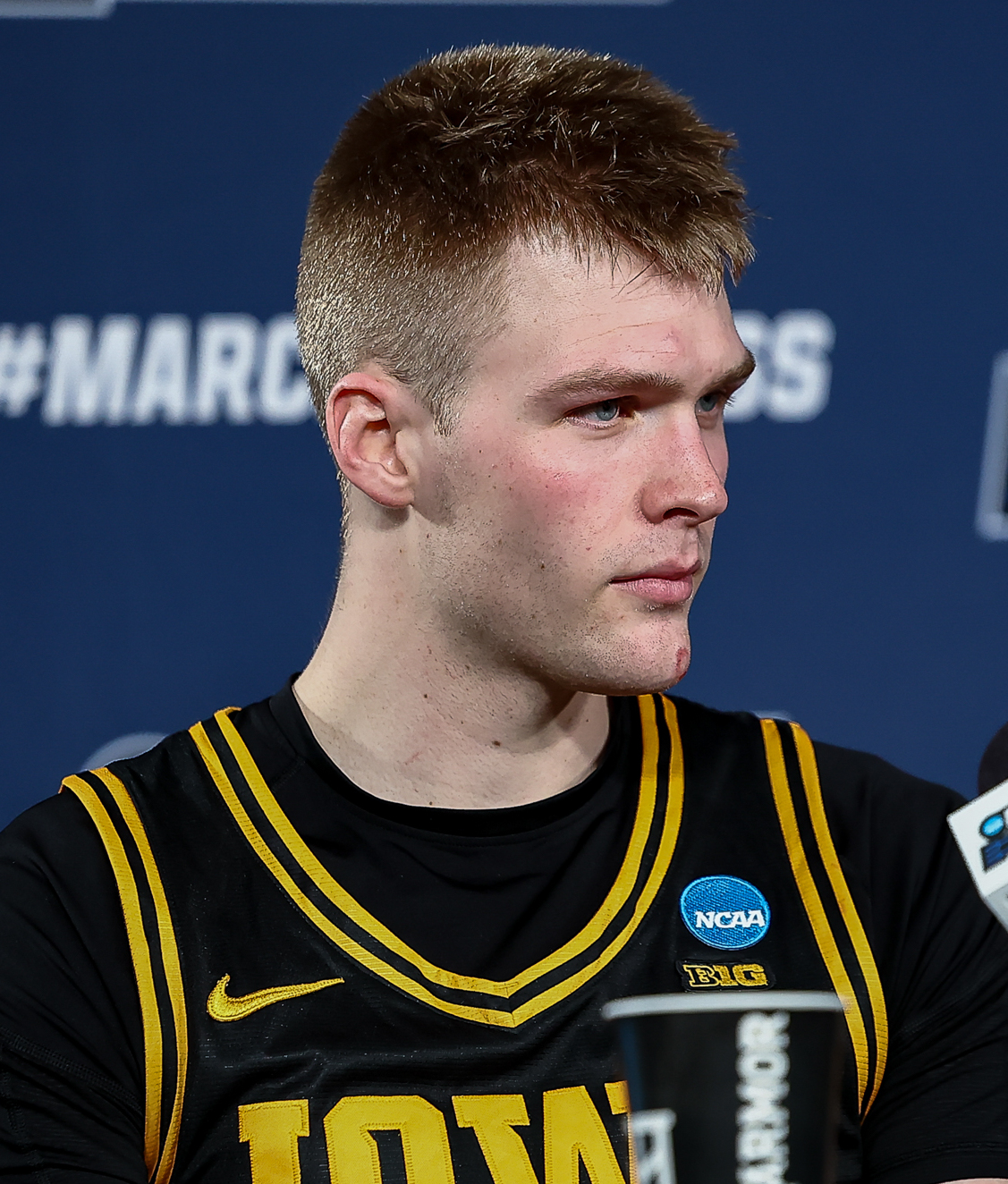
- Stirtz in 2026

No. 14 – Oklahoma City Thunder
- Position: Point guard
- League: NBA

Personal information
- Born: October 3, 2003 (age 23) Liberty, Missouri, U.S.
- Listed height: 6 ft 3 in (1.91 m)
- Listed weight: 180 lb (82 kg)

Career information
- High school: Liberty (Liberty, Missouri)
- College: Northwest Missouri State (2022–2024); Drake (2024–2025); Iowa (2025–2026)
- NBA draft: 2026: 1st round, 16th overall pick
- Drafted by: Memphis Grizzlies
- Playing career: 2026–present

Career history
- 2026–present: Oklahoma City Thunder

Career highlights
- MVC Player of the Year (2025); MVC Newcomer of the Year (2025); First-team All-MVC (2025); First-team All-Big Ten (2026); MVC tournament MVP (2025); 2× Second-team All-MIAA (2023, 2024); MIAA Freshman of the Year (2023)
- Stats at NBA.com
- Stats at Basketball Reference

Bennett Carl Stirtz (born October 3, 2003) is an American basketball player for the Oklahoma City Thunder of the National Basketball Association (NBA). He played college basketball for the Northwest Missouri State Bearcats, Drake Bulldogs and Iowa Hawkeyes.

== Early life and high school ==
Stirtz grew up in Liberty, Missouri and attended Liberty High School. He played basketball at Liberty and was coached by his father. Stirtz was named first-team All-State as a senior after averaging 18.3 points, 6.8 rebounds, 4 assists and 2.5 steals per game.

== College career ==
Stirtz began his college career at Northwest Missouri State. He was named the Mid-America Intercollegiate Athletics Association (MIAA) Freshman of the Year and second-team All-MIAA in his first season with the Bearcats. Stirtz repeated as a second-team All-MIAA selection as a sophomore after averaging 15.2 points, 3.5 rebounds, 3.5 assists and 1.4 steals per game.

Stirtz transferred to Drake after his sophomore season, following former Northwest Missouri head coach Ben McCollum. He was named the Missouri Valley Conference Men's Basketball Player of the Year and the conference Newcomer of the Year at the end of the regular season.

After one season at Drake, Stirtz announced he would be entering the transfer portal and following McCollum to the University of Iowa.

== Professional career ==
On June 23, 2026, Stirtz was drafted with the 16th overall pick by the Memphis Grizzlies in the 2026 NBA draft. He was then traded to the Oklahoma City Thunder for Ebuka Okorie and two second-round picks.

== Personal life ==
Stirtz is the son of Roger and Renee Stirtz. He has three siblings: Mason, Caden and Cooper.

Stirtz is a Christian. He has said, "Win or lose, give glory to God. He gave me a platform and I just want to use it for Him."
