= 2025 Missouri Valley Conference men's basketball tournament =

American college basketball postseason tournament

- Tournament logo
- Classification: Division I
- Season: 2024–25
- Teams: 12
- Site: Enterprise Center; St. Louis, Missouri
- Champions: Drake (4th title)
- Winning coach: Ben McCollum (1st title)
- MVP: Bennett Stirtz (Drake)
- Attendance: 36,077 (Total); 7,952 (Final)
- Television: CBS/Paramount+, CBSSN, MVC TV Network/ESPN+

2024–25 Missouri Valley Conference men's basketball standings
	Conf.				Overall
Team	W		L	PCT	W		L	PCT
Drake †	17	–	3	.850	31	–	4	.886
Bradley	15	–	5	.750	28	–	9	.757
Northern Iowa	14	–	6	.700	20	–	13	.606
Belmont	13	–	7	.650	22	–	11	.667
Illinois State	10	–	10	.500	22	–	14	.611
UIC	10	–	10	.500	17	–	14	.548
Murray State	9	–	11	.450	16	–	17	.485
Southern Illinois	8	–	12	.400	14	–	19	.424
Indiana State	8	–	12	.400	14	–	18	.438
Evansville	8	–	12	.400	11	–	21	.344
Valparaiso	6	–	14	.300	15	–	19	.441
Missouri State	2	–	18	.100	9	–	23	.281
† 2025 MVC tournament winner

The 2025 Missouri Valley Conference Men's Basketball Tournament, popularly referred to as "Arch Madness", was a postseason men's basketball tournament that completed the 2024–25 season in the Missouri Valley Conference. The tournament was held at the Enterprise Center in St. Louis, Missouri from March 6–9, 2025. The winner, Drake, received the conference's automatic bid to the 2025 NCAA Tournament.

== Seeds ==
Teams are seeded by conference record.

Two-way ties are broken by utilizing head-to-head record; should a tie still remain, the NCAA Evaluation Tool (NET) rankings the day following all conference teams having completed their regular season will be used.

Three (or more) way ties are broken by first determining the cumulative record for each tied team versus the other teams with the same conference record. Should any teams still remain tied (and there are more than two), the cumulative record would again be used on those remaining teams; should any teams still remain (and there are only two), the two-way approach would be leveraged.

The top four seeds receive opening-round byes. Since none of the ties in the standings could be broken using head-to-head records, they were all resolved using NET rankings as of March 3, 2025, the day following the end of regular-season conference play.

Seed	School	Conference Record	Tiebreaker(s)
1	Drake	17–3	
2	Bradley	15–5	
3	Northern Iowa	14–6	
4	Belmont	13–7	
5	Illinois State	10–10	NET ranking of 123
6	UIC	10–10	NET ranking of 145
7	Murray State	9–11	
8	Southern Illinois	8–12	NET ranking of 197
9	Indiana State	8–12	NET ranking of 203
10	Evansville	8–12	NET ranking of 243
11	Valparaiso	6–14	
12	Missouri State	2–18	

== Schedule ==
Game	Time *	Matchup	Score	Attendance	Television
Opening Round – Thursday, March 6
1	12:00 pm	No. 8 Southern Illinois vs. No. 9 Indiana State	86–85	4,402	MVC TV; Network/ ESPN+
2	2:30 pm	No. 5 Illinois State vs. No. 12 Missouri State	70–54	4,402	MVC TV; Network/ ESPN+
3	6:00 pm	No. 7 Murray State vs. No. 10 Evansville	74–53	3,849	MVC TV; Network/ ESPN+
4	8:30 pm	No. 6 UIC vs. No. 11 Valparaiso	50–67	3,849	MVC TV; Network/ ESPN+
Quarterfinals – Friday, March 7
5	12:00 pm	No. 1 Drake vs. No. 8 Southern Illinois	70–53	6,005	MVC TV; Network/ ESPN+
6	2:30 pm	No. 4 Belmont vs. No. 5 Illinois State	76–63	6,005	MVC TV; Network/ ESPN+
7	6:00 pm	No. 2 Bradley vs. No. 7 Murray State	70–62	6,090	MVC TV; Network/ ESPN+
8	8:30 pm	No. 3 Northern Iowa vs. No. 11 Valparaiso	63–64	6,090	MVC TV; Network/ ESPN+
Semifinals – Saturday, March 8
9	2:30 pm	No. 1 Drake vs. No. 4 Belmont	57–50	7,779	CBSSN
10	5:00 pm	No. 2 Bradley vs. No. 11 Valparaiso	70–65	7,779	CBSSN
Final – Sunday, March 9
11	1:15 pm	No. 1 Drake vs. No. 2 Bradley	63–48	7,952	CBS/ Paramount+
* Game times in CST through the semifinals and CDT for the championship; rankings denote tournament seed.

== Bracket ==
Opening Round; Thursday, March 6 MVC TV Network/ESPN+
8	Southern Illinois	86
9	Indiana State	85
5	Illinois State	70
12	Missouri State	54
7	Murray State	74
10	Evansville	53
6	UIC	50
11	Valparaiso	67

Quarterfinals; Friday, March 7 MVC TV Network/ESPN+
1	Drake	70
8	Southern Illinois	53
4	Belmont	76
5	Illinois State	63
2	Bradley	70
7	Murray State	62
3	Northern Iowa	63
11	Valparaiso	64

Semifinals; Saturday, March 8 CBSSN
1	Drake	57
4	Belmont	50
2	Bradley	70
11	Valparaiso	65

Final; Sunday, March 9 CBS/Paramount+
1	Drake	63
2	Bradley	48
