= Ben McCollum =

American basketball coach (born 1981)

Current position
- Title: Head coach
- Team: Iowa
- Conference: Big Ten
- Record: 26–15 (.634)

Biographical details
- Born: April 12, 1981 (age 45); Iowa City, Iowa, U.S.

Playing career
- 1999–2001: North Iowa Area
- 2001–2003: Northwest Missouri State

Coaching career (HC unless noted)
- 2003–2005: Northwest Missouri State (GA)
- 2005–2009: Emporia State (assistant)
- 2009–2024: Northwest Missouri State
- 2024–2025: Drake
- 2025–present: Iowa

Head coaching record
- Overall: 452–110 (.804)
- Tournaments: 4–2 (NCAA Division I); 32–7 (NCAA Division II)

Accomplishments and honors

Championships
- 4 NCAA Division II tournament (2017, 2019, 2021, 2022); 12 MIAA regular season (2012, 2014–2024); 8 MIAA tournament (2016–2020, 2022–2024); MVC regular season (2025); MVC tournament (2025)

Awards
- 5× NABC Division II Coach of the Year (2017, 2019–2022); 3× Clarence Gaines Award (2012, 2020, 2022); Basketball Times Division II Coach of the Year (2019); John McLendon Collegiate Basketball Coach of the Year (2019); 8× MIAA Coach of the Year (2012, 2015–2017, 2019–2021, 2023); MVC Coach of the Year (2025); Missouri Sports Hall of Fame

Benjamin Matthew McCollum (born April 12, 1981) is an American college basketball coach. He is the head men's basketball coach at the University of Iowa, a position he has held since 2025. McCollum served as the head men's basketball coach at Northwest Missouri State University for 15 seasons, from 2009 to 2024, and one season at Drake University, in 2024–25. He led the Northwest Missouri State Bearcats men's basketball program to four NCAA Division II men's basketball tournament titles, in 2017, 2019, 2021, and 2022.

== Biography ==
McCollum was born in Iowa City, Iowa, and grew up in Storm Lake, Iowa, where he graduated from St. Mary's High School in 1999. He played basketball for two years at North Iowa Area Community College before transferring in 2001 to Northwest Missouri State, where he played for Steve Tappmeyer as the school made its first Elite Eight appearance. He graduated from Northwest in 2003 with a degree in business finance and received a master's degree in athletic administration from the school in 2004.

He was an assistant coach at Emporia State University from 2004 to 2008, then was named the head coach Northwest Missouri State in 2009.

McCollum's team struggled the first two seasons with records of 12–15 in 2009–10 and 10–16 in 2010–11. In the 2011–12 season, his team went 22–7, won the regular-season MIAA crown and played in the first round of the Division II NCAA tournament. In 2012, he was honored for the turnaround with the Clarence Gaines Award as the best NCAA Division II coach.

His teams then went onto greater success, reaching the Division II Sweet 16 three years in a row from 2014 to 2016. In 2017, he won the first of four Division II national championships at Northwest Missouri State. His teams went on to win the national championship in 2019, 2021, and 2022. He also won the Clarence Gaines Award again in 2020 and 2022. McCollum finished his Northwest Missouri State career with four national titles.

McCollum was hired as head coach at Drake in 2024. After taking the Bulldogs to the second round of the 2025 NCAA tournament in his first year with the school, he was named the head coach at Iowa on March 24, 2025.

In his first season with the Hawkeyes, McCollum led the Hawkeyes to a 21–12 regular season record and a number 9 seed in the 2026 NCAA tournament. After an opening round win over Clemson in the second round, the Hawkeyes defeated number one seed Florida 73–72 to earn Iowa their first trip to the Sweet Sixteen since 1999. They then went on to beat Nebraska for their first trip to the Elite Eight since 1987, where they lost to Illinois.

== Personal life ==
McCollum is married and has three children. His son Peyton was offered a roster spot on the basketball team upon his hire at Iowa.

== Head coaching record ==
Record table
Season	Team	Overall	Conference	Standing	Postseason
Northwest Missouri State Bearcats (Mid-America Intercollegiate Athletics Association) (2009–2024)
2009–10	Northwest Missouri State	12–15	7–13	9th	
2010–11	Northwest Missouri State	10–16	8–14	10th	
2011–12	Northwest Missouri State	22–7	15–5	T–1st	NCAA Division II First Round
2012–13	Northwest Missouri State	21–10	11–7	6th	
2013–14	Northwest Missouri State	24–9	16–3	T–1st	NCAA Division II Sweet 16
2014–15	Northwest Missouri State	25–7	15–4	1st	NCAA Division II Sweet 16
2015–16	Northwest Missouri State	27–6	19–3	1st	NCAA Division II Sweet 16
2016–17	Northwest Missouri State	35–1	18–1	1st	NCAA Division II National Champion
2017–18	Northwest Missouri State	27–4	16–3	1st	NCAA Division II First Round
2018–19	Northwest Missouri State	38–0	19–0	1st	NCAA Division II National Champion
2019–20	Northwest Missouri State	31–1	18–1	1st	NCAA Division II canceled
2020–21	Northwest Missouri State	28–2	21–1	1st	NCAA Division II National Champion
2021–22	Northwest Missouri State	34–5	18–4	T–1st	NCAA Division II National Champion
2022–23	Northwest Missouri State	31–3	20–2	1st	NCAA Division II Second Round
2023–24	Northwest Missouri State	29–5	20–2	1st	NCAA Division II Sweet 16
Northwest Missouri State:		395–91 (.813)	241–63 (.793)		
Drake Bulldogs (Missouri Valley Conference) (2024–2025)
2024–25	Drake	31–4	17–3	1st	NCAA Division I Round of 32
Drake:		31–4 (.886)	17–3 (.850)		
Iowa Hawkeyes (Big Ten Conference) (2025–present)
2025–26	Iowa	24–13	10–10	9th	NCAA Division I Elite Eight
2026–27	Iowa	2–2	0–0		
Iowa:		26–15 (.634)	10–10 (.500)		
Total:		452–110 (.804)			
National champion Postseason invitational champion Conference regular season champion Conference regular season and conference tournament champion Division regular season champion Division regular season and conference tournament champion Conference tournament champion
