= 2022–23 Bradley Braves men's basketball team =

American college basketball season

2022–23 Bradley Braves men's basketball

Missouri Valley regular season champions

NIT first round
- Conference: Missouri Valley Conference
- Record: 25–10 (16–4 MVC)
- Head coach: Brian Wardle (8th season)
- Assistant coaches: Jimmie Foster; Mike Bargen; Brian Jones
- Home arena: Carver Arena

2022–23 Missouri Valley Conference men's basketball standings
	Conf.				Overall
Team	W		L	PCT	W		L	PCT
Bradley	16	–	4	.800	25	–	10	.714
Drake †	15	–	5	.750	27	–	8	.771
Southern Illinois	14	–	6	.700	23	–	10	.697
Belmont	14	–	6	.700	21	–	11	.656
Indiana State	13	–	7	.650	23	–	13	.639
Missouri State	12	–	8	.600	17	–	15	.531
Murray State	11	–	9	.550	17	–	15	.531
Northern Iowa	9	–	11	.450	14	–	18	.438
Illinois State	6	–	14	.300	11	–	21	.344
Valparaiso	5	–	15	.250	11	–	21	.344
UIC	4	–	16	.200	12	–	20	.375
Evansville	1	–	19	.050	5	–	27	.156
† 2023 MVC tournament winner

The 2022–23 Bradley Braves men's basketball team represented Bradley University during the 2022–23 NCAA Division I men's basketball season. The Braves, led by eighth-year head coach Brian Wardle, played their home games at Carver Arena in Peoria, Illinois, as members of the Missouri Valley Conference. They finished the season 25–10, 16–4 in MVC play to win the regular season championship for the first time since 1996. They defeated Northern Iowa and Indiana State in the MVC tournament before losing to Drake in the championship game. As a regular season champion who did not win their conference tournament, they received an automatic bid to the National Invitation Tournament. There they lost to Wisconsin in the first round.

== Previous season ==
The Braves finished the 2021–22 season 17–14, 11–7 in MVC play to finish in fifth place. They lost to Loyola in the quarterfinals of the MVC tournament.

== Roster ==
2022–23 Bradley Braves men's basketball team
Players
Coaches

Pos.	#	Name	Height	Weight	Year	Previous school	Hometown
G	1	James Weathers	6 ft 0 in (1.83 m)	180 lb (82 kg)	Jr	Glen Oaks HS; State College of Florida	Baton Rouge, LA
G	2	Max Ekono	6 ft 7 in (2.01 m)	210 lb (95 kg)	So	Scotland Prep	Bouffémont, France
G	3	Zek Montgomery	6 ft 6 in (1.98 m)	210 lb (95 kg)	So	St. Louis Christian Academy	Louisville, KY
G/F	5	Christian Davis	6 ft 7 in (2.01 m)	190 lb (86 kg)	So	New Hampton School; LeMoyne–Owen College	Denver, CO
G	10	Connor Hickman	6 ft 3 in (1.91 m)	195 lb (88 kg)	So	Bloomington South HS	Bloomington, IN
G	12	Cade Hardtke (W)	6 ft 2 in (1.88 m)	185 lb (84 kg)	So	Glenbard South HS	Lombard, IL
G	13	Sam Hennessy (W)	6 ft 2 in (1.88 m)	185 lb (84 kg)	So	Benet Academy	Naperville, IL
F	14	Malevy Leons	6 ft 9 in (2.06 m)	210 lb (95 kg)	Sr	Mineral Area	IJmuiden, Netherlands
G	21	Duke Deen	5 ft 8 in (1.73 m)	160 lb (73 kg)	Jr	Bossier HS; Troy	Shreveport, LA
F	22	Ja'Shon Henry	6 ft 6 in (1.98 m)	230 lb (104 kg)	GS	Athol Murray College of Notre Dame	Saskatoon, Saskatchewan
G	23	Ville Tahvanainen	6 ft 4 in (1.93 m)	210 lb (95 kg)	Sr	Helsinki Basketball Academy	Helsinki, Finland
F	25	Goanar Biliew	6 ft 8 in (2.03 m)	230 lb (104 kg)	Jr	Denison HS; Des Moines Area CC	Denison, IA
F	32	Sulaiman Agiste	6 ft 9 in (2.06 m)	200 lb (91 kg)	Fr	Michele Clark Magnet HS	Chicago, IL
F	34	Connor Linke	6 ft 9 in (2.06 m)	230 lb (104 kg)	Jr	St. Charles North HS	St. Charles, IL
F	35	Darius Hannah	6 ft 9 in (2.06 m)	200 lb (91 kg)	Jr	Milwaukee Academy of Science	Milwaukee, WI
F	51	Rienk Mast	6 ft 9 in (2.06 m)	240 lb (109 kg)	RS Jr	Donar Groningen	Groningen, Netherlands

Head coach

- Brian Wardle (Marquette)

Assistant coach(es)

- Mike Bargen (Marquette)
- Jimmie Foster (South Dakota)
- Brian Jones (Northern Iowa)

Legend

- (C) Team captain
- (S) Suspended
- (I) Ineligible
- (W) Walk-on
- Injured
- Current redshirt

Roster
Last update: December 11, 2022

== Schedule and results ==
Date time, TV	Rank^{#}	Opponent^{#}	Result	Record	Site (attendance) city, state
Exhibition
November 2, 2022*; 7:00 pm		Illinois Wesleyan	W 79–64	–	Carver Arena (3,528); Peoria, IL
Regular season
November 7, 2022*; 7:00 pm, ESPN3		Wisconsin–Parkside	W 93–59	1–0	Carver Arena (3,761); Peoria, IL
November 11, 2022*; 8:00 pm, Mountain West Network		at Utah State	L 62–84	1–1	Smith Spectrum (6,875); Logan, UT
November 15, 2022*; 7:00 pm, ESPN+		Eastern Michigan	W 89–61	2–1	Carver Arena (4,110); Peoria, IL
November 19, 2022*; 3:00 pm, ESPN+		Southeast Missouri State	W 73–60	3–1	Carver Arena (4,826); Peoria, IL
November 22, 2022*; 5:00 pm, CBSSN		vs. No. 13 Auburn; Cancún Challenge Riviera semifinal	L 64–85	3–2	Hard Rock Hotel Riviera Maya (951); Cancún, Mexico
November 23, 2022*; 6:00 pm, CBSSN		vs. Liberty; Cancún Challenge Riviera consolation	L 44–55	3–3	Hard Rock Hotel Riviera Maya (271); Cancún, Mexico
November 26, 2022*; 3:00 pm, ESPN3		Merrimack	W 83–41	4–3	Carver Arena (3,714); Peoria, IL
November 30, 2022; 7:00 pm, ESPN+		Northern Iowa	W 68–53	5–3 (1–0)	Carver Arena (4,043); Peoria, IL
December 3, 2022; 7:00 pm, ESPN+		at Missouri State	W 58–40	6–3 (2–0)	Great Southern Bank Arena (3,582); Springfield, MO
December 6, 2022*; 7:00 pm, ESPN+		at SIU Edwardsville	W 56–54	7–3	First Community Arena (1,516); Edwardsville, IL
December 17, 2022*; 3:00 pm		vs. No. 10 Arkansas	L 57–76	7–4	Simmons Bank Arena (16,675); North Little Rock, AR
December 19, 2022*; 7:00 pm, ESPN+		Stonehill	W 79–50	8–4	Carver Arena (3,716); Peoria, IL
December 22, 2022*; 4:00 pm, ESPN+		Akron	W 74–55	9–4	Carver Arena (3,530); Peoria, IL
December 28, 2022; 7:00 pm, MVC TV		at Belmont	L 60–63	9–5 (2–1)	Curb Event Center (2,019); Nashville, TN
December 31, 2022; 1:00 pm, MVC TV		UIC	W 79–45	10–5 (3–1)	Carver Arena (4,890); Peoria, IL
January 4, 2023; 7:00 pm, ESPN+		at Murray State	L 58–67	10–6 (3–2)	CFSB Center (3,891); Murray, KY
January 7, 2023; 2:00 pm, CBSSN		Valparaiso	W 88–66	11–6 (4–2)	Carver Arena (4,476); Peoria, IL
January 11, 2023; 7:00 pm, ESPN+		Evansville	W 91–46	12–6 (5–2)	Carver Arena (3,905); Peoria, IL
January 14, 2023; 7:00 pm, ESPNU		at Drake	L 61–86	12–7 (5–3)	Knapp Center (4,144); Des Moines, IA
January 18, 2023; 6:00 pm, ESPN+		at Indiana State	W 78–67	13–7 (6–3)	Hulman Center (4,038); Terre Haute, IN
January 21, 2023; 3:00 pm, ESPN+		Belmont	L 76–78	13–8 (6–4)	Carver Arena (5,584); Peoria, IL
January 25, 2023; 7:00 pm, ESPN+		Illinois State; I-74 Rivalry	W 79–75 ^{OT}	14–8 (7–4)	Carver Arena (6,046); Peoria, IL
January 29, 2023; 2:00 pm, ESPN+		at UIC	W 83–76	15–8 (8–4)	Credit Union 1 Arena (2,240); Chicago, IL
February 1, 2023; 7:00 pm, ESPN+		Southern Illinois	W 62–52	16–8 (9–4)	Carver Arena (4,817); Peoria, IL
February 4, 2023; 5:00 pm, ESPNews		at Northern Iowa	W 77–69	17–8 (10–4)	McLeod Center (4,392); Cedar Falls, IA
February 8, 2023; 7:00 pm, MVC TV		at Illinois State; I-74 Rivalry	W 79–61	18–8 (11–4)	CEFCU Arena (5,374); Normal, IL
February 11, 2023; 1:00 pm, ESPN3		Murray State	W 83–48	19–8 (12–4)	Carver Arena (6,213); Peoria, IL
February 15, 2023; 7:00 pm, ESPN+		Missouri State	W 64–54	20–8 (13–4)	Carver Arena (4,791); Peoria, IL
February 19, 2023; 1:00 pm, ESPN2/ESPN+		at Southern Illinois	W 50–48	21–8 (14–4)	Banterra Center (6,516); Carbondale, IL
February 22, 2023; 6:00 pm, MVC TV		at Valparaiso	W 76–66	22–8 (15–4)	Athletics–Recreation Center (1,848); Valparaiso, IN
February 26, 2023; 3:00 pm, ESPN2		Drake	W 73–61	23–8 (16–4)	Carver Arena (10,458); Peoria, IL
MVC Tournament
March 3, 2023; 12:00 pm, MVC TV	(1)	vs. (8) Northern Iowa; Quarterfinals	W 72–66	24–8	Enterprise Center; St. Louis, MO
March 4, 2023; 2:30 pm, CBSSN	(1)	vs. (5) Indiana State; Semifinals	W 71–70	25–8	Enterprise Center; St. Louis, MO
March 5, 2023; 1:00 pm, CBS	(1)	vs. (2) Drake; Championship	L 51–77	25–9	Enterprise Center; St. Louis, MO
NIT
March 14, 2023*; 8:30 pm, ESPN	(7)	at (2) Wisconsin; First round – Oregon bracket	L 62–81	25–10	Kohl Center (3,919); Madison, WI
*Non-conference game. ^{#}Rankings from AP Poll. (#) Tournament seedings in parentheses. All times are in Central Time.
