= 2022–23 Northern Iowa Panthers men's basketball team =

American college basketball season

2022–23 Northern Iowa Panthers men's basketball
- Conference: Missouri Valley Conference
- Record: 14–18 (9–11 MVC)
- Head coach: Ben Jacobson (17th season)
- Assistant coaches: P. J. Hogan; Seth Tuttle; Gameli Ahelegbe
- Home arena: McLeod Center

2022–23 Missouri Valley Conference men's basketball standings
	Conf.				Overall
Team	W		L	PCT	W		L	PCT
Bradley	16	–	4	.800	25	–	10	.714
Drake †	15	–	5	.750	27	–	8	.771
Southern Illinois	14	–	6	.700	23	–	10	.697
Belmont	14	–	6	.700	21	–	11	.656
Indiana State	13	–	7	.650	23	–	13	.639
Missouri State	12	–	8	.600	17	–	15	.531
Murray State	11	–	9	.550	17	–	15	.531
Northern Iowa	9	–	11	.450	14	–	18	.438
Illinois State	6	–	14	.300	11	–	21	.344
Valparaiso	5	–	15	.250	11	–	21	.344
UIC	4	–	16	.200	12	–	20	.375
Evansville	1	–	19	.050	5	–	27	.156
† 2023 MVC tournament winner

The 2022–23 Northern Iowa Panthers men's basketball team represented the University of Northern Iowa during the 2022–23 NCAA Division I men's basketball season. The Panthers, led by 17th-year head coach Ben Jacobson, played their home games at the McLeod Center in Cedar Falls, Iowa as members of the Missouri Valley Conference. They finished the season 13–17, 9–11 in MVC Play to finish in 8th place. In the MVC tournament, they defeated Illinois State in the opening round before losing to Bradley in the quarterfinals.

== Previous season ==
With a win over Loyola on February 26, 2022, the Panthers won the regular season MVC championship. They finished the regular season 18–10, 14–4 in MVC play to finish in first place. They defeated Illinois State in the quarterfinals of the MVC tournament before losing in the semifinals to Loyola. As a No. 1 seed who didn't win their conference tournament, they received an automatic bid to the National Invitation Tournament where they defeated Saint Louis in the first round before losing in the second round to BYU.

== Offseason ==
=== Departures ===
Name	Number	Pos.	Height	Weight	Year	Hometown	Reason for departure
Tywhon Pickford	3	G	6'4"	200	Senior	Minneapolis, MN	Graduated
AJ Green	4	G	6'4"	190	Junior	Cedar Falls, IA	Declared for NBA draft
Trae Berhow	11	G	6'5"	198	Senior	Mayer, MN	Graduated
Antwan Kimmons	22	G	6'0"	185	Sophomore	Oakdale, MN	Transferred to Concordia St. Paul
Noah Carter	35	F	6'6"	229	Sophomore	Dubuque, IA	Transferred to Missouri

=== 2021 recruiting class ===
College recruiting information
Name	Hometown	School	Height	Weight	Commit date
Trey Campbell; PG	Cedar Falls, IA	Cedar Falls High School	6 ft 3 in (1.91 m)	170 lb (77 kg)	Aug 6, 2021
Trey Campbell; PG	Recruit ratings: Scout: Rivals: (N/A)				
Overall recruit ranking:
Note: In many cases, Scout, Rivals, 247Sports, On3, and ESPN may conflict in their listings of height and weight.; In these cases, the average was taken. ESPN grades are on a 100-point scale.; Sources: "2022 Team Ranking". Rivals.

== Roster ==
2022–23 Northern Iowa Panthers men's basketball team
Players
Coaches

Pos.	#	Name	Height	Weight	Year	Previous school	Hometown
G	0	Nate Heise	6 ft 5 in (1.96 m)	205 lb (93 kg)	So	Lincoln	Lake City, MN
F	1	Cole Henry	6 ft 9 in (2.06 m)	230 lb (104 kg)	RS So	Oskaloosa	Oskaloosa, IA
G	2	Ege Peksari	6 ft 4 in (1.93 m)	195 lb (88 kg)	Fr	Sisli Terakki	İzmir, Turkey
G	3	Landon Wolf	6 ft 5 in (1.96 m)	195 lb (88 kg)	RS Fr	Cedar Falls	Cedar Falls, IA
G	4	Trey Campbell	6 ft 3 in (1.91 m)	178 lb (81 kg)	Fr	Cedar Falls	Cedar Falls, IA
G	12	Charlie Miller (W)	6 ft 0 in (1.83 m)	165 lb (75 kg)	Fr	Lumberton	Lumberton, NC
G	13	Bowen Born	5 ft 11 in (1.8 m)	175 lb (79 kg)	Jr	Norwalk	Norwalk, IA
G/F	15	Michael Duax	6 ft 6 in (1.98 m)	215 lb (98 kg)	RS Fr	Hempstead	Dubuque, IA
F	20	Chase Courbat	6 ft 9 in (2.06 m)	235 lb (107 kg)	RS Fr	Cedar Falls	Cedar Falls, IA
F	23	Derek Krogmann (W)	6 ft 7 in (2.01 m)	235 lb (107 kg)	RS So	West Delaware	Manchester, IA
G	30	Hunter Jacobson (W)	6 ft 1 in (1.85 m)	175 lb (79 kg)	Fr	Cedar Falls	Cedar Falls, IA
G/F	32	Tytan Anderson	6 ft 6 in (1.98 m)	200 lb (91 kg)	So	North Scott	Eldridge, IA
G	33	Drew Daniel (W)	6 ft 7 in (2.01 m)	220 lb (100 kg)	So	Dowling Catholic	West Des Moines, IA
F	34	James Betz	6 ft 6 in (1.98 m)	230 lb (104 kg)	Jr	Garner–Hayfield–Ventura	Ventura, IA
F	50	Austin Phyfe	6 ft 9 in (2.06 m)	240 lb (109 kg)	RS Sr	Waverly-Shell Rock	Waverly, IA

Head coach

- Ben Jacobson (North Dakota)

Assistant coach(es)

- P. J. Hogan (Morningside)
- Seth Tuttle (Northern Iowa)
- Gameli Ahelegbe (Minnesota State)

Legend

- (C) Team captain
- (S) Suspended
- (I) Ineligible
- (W) Walk-on
- Injured
- Current redshirt

Roster
Last update: February 14, 2023

== Schedule and results ==
Date time, TV	Rank^{#}	Opponent^{#}	Result	Record	Site (attendance) city, state
Exhibition
November 2, 2022*; 7:00 p.m., ESPN+		Dubuque	W 84–52	–	McLeod Center (2,608); Cedar Falls, IA
Regular Season
November 7, 2022*; 7:30 p.m., ESPN3		Wartburg	W 105–49	1–0	McLeod Center (3,331); Cedar Falls, IA
November 11, 2022*; 7:00 p.m., ESPN+		at Richmond	L 55–68	1–1	Robins Center (6,814); Richmond, VA
November 14, 2022*; 7:00 p.m., ACCN		at No. 16 Virginia	Canceled due to campus shooting		John Paul Jones Arena; Charlottesville, VA
November 21, 2022*; 11:30 a.m., CBSSN		vs. San Francisco; NABC Hall of Fame Classic Semifinals	L 69–75	1–2	T-Mobile Center (301); Kansas City, MO
November 22, 2022*; 10:30 a.m., CBSSN		vs. Grand Canyon; NABC Hall of Fame Classic Consolation	L 67–69	1–3	T-Mobile Center (201); Kansas City, MO
November 26, 2022*; 1:00 p.m., ESPN+		Northern Illinois	W 83–76	2–3	McLeod Center (3,378); Cedar Falls, IA
November 30, 2022; 7:00 p.m., ESPN+		at Bradley	L 53–68	2–4 (0–1)	Carver Arena (4,043); Peoria, IL
December 3, 2022; 1:00 p.m., ESPN+		Evansville	W 72–55	3–4 (1–1)	McLeod Center (2,983); Cedar Falls, IA
December 6, 2022*; 7:30 p.m., ESPN+		Toledo	L 75–83	3–5	McLeod Center (2,474); Cedar Falls, IA
December 9, 2022*; 7:00 p.m., ESPN+		McNeese State	L 49–52	3–6	McLeod Center (3,620); Cedar Falls, IA
December 12, 2022*; 7:00 p.m., ESPN+		South Florida	L 69–72	3–7	McLeod Center (2,750); Cedar Falls, IA
December 17, 2022*; 12:00 p.m., ESPN+		vs. Towson; Legends of Basketball Chicago Hoops Showcase	W 83–66	4–7	United Center; Chicago, IL
December 21, 2022*; 6:00 p.m., ESPN+		St. Bonaventure	W 62–52	5–7	McLeod Center (1,876); Cedar Falls, IA
December 28, 2022; 7:00 p.m., ESPN+		Missouri State	L 67–79	5–8 (1–2)	McLeod Center (4,123); Cedar Falls, IA
December 31, 2022; 2:00 p.m., ESPN+		at Illinois State	W 66–60	6–8 (2–2)	CEFCU Arena (3,208); Normal, IL
January 4, 2023; 6:00 p.m., ESPN+		at Valparaiso	W 69–67	7–8 (3–2)	Athletics–Recreation Center (915); Valparaiso, IN
January 7, 2023; 1:00 p.m., ESPN+		Southern Illinois	W 69–57	8–8 (4–2)	McLeod Center (3,391); Cedar Falls, IA
January 10, 2023; 7:00 p.m., ESPN+		Murray State	W 75–67	9–8 (5–2)	McLeod Center (3,201); Cedar Falls, IA
January 14, 2023; 4:00 p.m., ESPN+		at Belmont	L 72–76	9–9 (5–3)	Curb Event Center (2,700); Nashville, TN
January 18, 2023; 7:00 p.m., ESPN+		Illinois State	W 65–63	10–9 (6–3)	McLeod Center (2,935); Cedar Falls, IA
January 21, 2023; 1:00 p.m., ESPN+		at UIC	W 78–72	11–9 (7–3)	Credit Union 1 Arena (2,312); Chicago, IL
January 25, 2023; 7:00 p.m., ESPN+		Valparaiso	W 77–66	12–9 (8–3)	McLeod Center (3,674); Cedar Falls, IA
January 28, 2023; 12:00 p.m., ESPN+		at Indiana State	L 71–79	12–10 (8–4)	Hulman Center (4,419); Terre Haute, IN
February 1, 2023; 8:00 p.m., ESPN+		at Drake	L 81–88 ^{2OT}	12–11 (8–5)	Knapp Center (6,229); Des Moines, IA
February 4, 2023; 5:00 p.m., ESPNews		Bradley	L 69–77	12–12 (8–6)	McLeod Center (4,392); Cedar Falls, IA
February 8, 2023; 7:00 p.m., ESPN+		at Evansville	L 59–71	12–13 (8–7)	Ford Center (4,094); Evansville, IN
February 11, 2023; 1:00 p.m., ESPN3		Indiana State	L 62–80	12–14 (8–8)	McLeod Center (4,174); Cedar Falls, IA
February 15, 2023; 8:00 p.m., ESPN+		Drake	L 74–82	12–15 (8–9)	McLeod Center (4,469); Cedar Falls, IA
February 18, 2023; 3:00 p.m., ESPN3		at Missouri State	W 69–66	13–15 (9–9)	Great Southern Bank Arena (4,002); Springfield, MO
February 22, 2023; 7:00 p.m., ESPN+		at Southern Illinois	L 63–86	13–16 (9–10)	Banterra Center (5,101); Carbondale, IL
February 26, 2023; 11:30 a.m., ESPN+		Belmont	L 75–83	13–17 (9–11)	McLeod Center; Cedar Falls, IA
MVC Tournament
March 2, 2023; 12:00 pm, MVC TV	(8)	vs. (9) Illinois State; Opening round	W 75–62	14–17	Enterprise Center (3,161); St. Louis, MO
March 3, 2023; 12:00 pm, MVC TV	(8)	vs. (1) Bradley; Quarterfinals	L 66–72	14–18	Enterprise Center; St. Louis, MO
*Non-conference game. ^{#}Rankings from AP Poll. (#) Tournament seedings in parentheses. All times are in Central Time.
