= 2022–23 Drake Bulldogs men's basketball team =

American college basketball season

2022–23 Drake Bulldogs men's basketball

Missouri Valley tournament champions Paradise Jam champions

NCAA tournament, First Round
- Conference: Missouri Valley Conference
- Record: 27–8 (15–5 MVC)
- Head coach: Darian DeVries (5th season)
- Assistant coaches: Marty Richter; Tom Ostrom; Corey Edwards
- Home arena: Knapp Center

2022–23 Missouri Valley Conference men's basketball standings
	Conf.				Overall
Team	W		L	PCT	W		L	PCT
Bradley	16	–	4	.800	25	–	10	.714
Drake †	15	–	5	.750	27	–	8	.771
Southern Illinois	14	–	6	.700	23	–	10	.697
Belmont	14	–	6	.700	21	–	11	.656
Indiana State	13	–	7	.650	23	–	13	.639
Missouri State	12	–	8	.600	17	–	15	.531
Murray State	11	–	9	.550	17	–	15	.531
Northern Iowa	9	–	11	.450	14	–	18	.438
Illinois State	6	–	14	.300	11	–	21	.344
Valparaiso	5	–	15	.250	11	–	21	.344
UIC	4	–	16	.200	12	–	20	.375
Evansville	1	–	19	.050	5	–	27	.156
† 2023 MVC tournament winner

The 2022–23 Drake Bulldogs men's basketball team represented Drake University in the 2022–23 NCAA Division I men's basketball season. The Bulldogs, led by fifth-year head coach Darian DeVries, played their home games at the Knapp Center in Des Moines, Iowa as members of the Missouri Valley Conference (MVC). They finished the regular season 27–7, 15–5 in MVC play to finish in second place. In the MVC tournament, they defeated Murray State, Southern Illinois, and Bradley to win the tournament championship. As a result, they received the conference's automatic bid to the NCAA tournament, where they were defeated by Miami (FL) in the first round.

== Previous season ==
The Bulldogs finished the 2021–22 season 22–9, 13–5 in MVC play to finish in a tie for second place. As the No. 3 seed in the MVC tournament, they defeated Southern Illinois in the quarterfinals and Missouri State in the semifinals before losing to Loyola in the championship. The Bulldogs accepted an invitation to the College Basketball Invitational and earned the No. 1 overall seed. They defeated Purdue Fort Wayne in the first round before losing to UNC Wilmington in the quarterfinals.

== Offseason ==
=== Departures ===
Name	Number	Pos.	Height	Weight	Year	Hometown	Reason for departure
Tremell Murphy	2	F	6'6"	210	RS Senior	Griffith, IN	Graduated
ShanQuan Hemphill	4	F	6'6"	200	Senior	Gary, IN	Graduated
Ayo Akinwole	14	G	5'11"	180	Senior	Papillion, NE	Graduated
Jonah Jackson	20	G	6'3"	205	Senior	Merrillville, IN	Graduated
Jordan Kwiecinski	21	F	6'9"	205	Sophomore	Chicago, IL	Transferred to Eckerd College
Deven Dahlke	41	F	6'2"	188	Sophomore	Phoenix, AZ	Transferred to San Diego

=== Incoming transfers ===
Name	Number	Pos.	Height	Weight	Year	Hometown	Previous School
Brashon Hall	2	G	6'1"	185	Sophomore	Roswell, GA	Transferred from Voorhees
Sardaar Calhoun	14	G/F	6'6"	210	Senior	Tappahannock, VA	Transferred from Texas Tech
Eric Northweather	35	F	6'10"	225	Sophomore	Jefferson City, MO	Transferred from Truman State

== Preseason ==
The Bulldogs were picked to finish first in the conference's preseason poll. Forward Tucker DeVries was named MVC Preseason Player of the Year and selected to the preseason All-MVC first team.

== Roster ==
2022–23 Drake Bulldogs men's basketball team
Players
Coaches

Pos.	#	Name	Height	Weight	Year	Previous school	Hometown
G	0	D. J. Wilkins	6 ft 2 in (1.88 m)	188 lb (85 kg)	GS	Florida Southwestern State; Merrillville	Merrillville, IN
G	1	Roman Penn	6 ft 0 in (1.83 m)	185 lb (84 kg)	GS	Siena; Bishop Noll	Calumet City, IL
G	2	Brashon Hall	6 ft 1 in (1.85 m)	185 lb (84 kg)	So	Voorhees; Centennial	Roswell, GA
G	3	Garrett Sturtz (W)	6 ft 3 in (1.91 m)	180 lb (82 kg)	GS	Newton	Newton, IA
G	4	Conor Enright	6 ft 0 in (1.83 m)	180 lb (82 kg)	RS Fr	Mundelein	Mundelein, IL
G	10	Okay Djamgouz	6 ft 5 in (1.96 m)	190 lb (86 kg)	RS Jr	London Basketball Academy	Toronto, Canada
G/F	11	Bryceson Burns	6 ft 5 in (1.96 m)	195 lb (88 kg)	RS Fr	Westfield	Houston, TX
G/F	12	Tucker DeVries	6 ft 7 in (2.01 m)	210 lb (95 kg)	So	Waukee	Waukee, IA
F	13	Issa Samake	6 ft 8 in (2.03 m)	225 lb (102 kg)	RS So	Grand View Christian	Des Moines, IA
G/F	14	Sardaar Calhoun	6 ft 6 in (1.98 m)	210 lb (95 kg)	Sr	Texas Tech; Blue Ridge School	Tappahannock, VA
G	21	Andrew Alia (W)	6 ft 2 in (1.88 m)	190 lb (86 kg)	Fr	St. Joseph	Kenosha, WI
F	24	Nate Ferguson	6 ft 8 in (2.03 m)	220 lb (100 kg)	RS Jr	Lemont	Lemont, IL
F	35	Eric Northweather	6 ft 10 in (2.08 m)	225 lb (102 kg)	So	Truman State; Blair Oaks	Jefferson City, MO
F	51	Darnell Brodie	6 ft 10 in (2.08 m)	275 lb (125 kg)	Sr	Seton Hall; Newark East Side	Newark, NJ

Head coach

- Darian DeVries (Northern Iowa)

Assistant coach(es)

- Marty Richter (Simpson)
- Tom Ostrom (Minnesota)
- Corey Edwards (George Mason)

Legend

- (C) Team captain
- (S) Suspended
- (I) Ineligible
- (W) Walk-on
- Injured
- Current redshirt

Roster

== Schedule and results ==
Date time, TV	Rank^{#}	Opponent^{#}	Result	Record	High points	High rebounds	High assists	Site (attendance) city, state
Exhibition
November 3, 2022*; 7:00 pm		Minnesota Duluth	W 100–77		35 – Calhoun	15 – Brodie	6 – Enright	Knapp Center (2,576); Des Moines, IA
Regular season
November 9, 2022*; 7:00 pm, MC22		IUPUI	W 80–48	1–0	20 – DeVries	8 – Tied	4 – Enright	Knapp Center (2,845); Des Moines, IA
November 14, 2022*; 7:00 pm, MC22		Wofford	W 80–72	2–0	17 – Calhoun	9 – DeVries	5 – Penn	Knapp Center (2,529); Des Moines, IA
November 18, 2022*; 12:00 p.m., ESPN3		vs. Buffalo; Paradise Jam Quarterfinals	W 80–72	3–0	22 – DeVries	10 – Brodie	6 – Penn	Sports and Fitness Center (1,524); Saint Thomas, U.S. Virgin Islands
November 20, 2022*; 4:45 p.m, ESPN3		vs. Wyoming; Paradise Jam Semifinals	W 61–56	4–0	29 – DeVries	9 – Brodie	3 – Enright	Sports and Fitness Center (1,224); Saint Thomas, U.S. Virgin Islands
November 21, 2022*; 7:00 p.m, ESPN3		vs. Tarleton State; Paradise Jam Championship	W 71–64	5–0	22 – DeVries	11 – Sturtz	3 – Tied	Sports and Fitness Center (1,424); Saint Thomas, U.S. Virgin Islands
November 26, 2022*; 5:00 pm, MC22		Louisiana	W 76–64	6–0	21 – Tied	11 – Brodie	4 – DeVries	Knapp Center (2,810); Des Moines, IA
November 30, 2022; 6:00 pm, MVC TV		at Indiana State	L 73–75	6–1 (0–1)	32 – Penn	13 – Sturtz	4 – Penn	Hulman Center (3,459); Terre Haute, IN
December 3, 2022; 5:00 pm, MC22		UIC	W 77–64	7–1 (1–1)	25 – DeVries	6 – DeVries	5 – Brodie	Knapp Center (2,860); Des Moines, IA
December 7, 2022*; 7:00 pm, MC22		Omaha	W 78–65	8–1	18 – Brodie	11 – Brodie	4 – Penn	Knapp Center (2,702); Des Moines, IA
December 10, 2022*; 1:00 pm, ESPN+		at Richmond	L 52–82	8–2	17 – Calhoun	8 – Brodie	2 – Sturtz	Robins Center (6,447); Richmond, VA
December 17, 2022*; 7:00 pm, BSMW		at Saint Louis	L 75–83	8–3	15 – DeVries	8 – Brodie	7 – Penn	Chaifetz Arena (7,251); St. Louis, MO
December 20, 2022*; 4:00 pm, BallerTV		vs. No. 15 Mississippi State; Battle in the Vault	W 58–52	9–3	19 – Penn	9 – Sturtz	3 – Tied	Pinnacle Bank Arena; Lincoln, NE
December 21, 2022*; 1:00 p.m., ESPN+		St. Ambrose	W 124–48	10–3	21 – Tied	11 – DeVries	5 – Wilkins	Knapp Center (783); Des Moines, IA
December 29, 2022; 8:00 pm, CBSSN		Valparaiso	W 68–63	11–3 (2–1)	19 – Brodie	9 – Brodie	5 – Penn	Knapp Center (3,078); Des Moines, IA
January 1, 2023; 2:00 pm, ESPN+		at Missouri State	L 49–52	11–4 (2–2)	20 – DeVries	13 – Brodie	8 – Penn	Great Southern Bank Arena (2,836); Springfield, MO
January 4, 2023; 7:00 pm, ESPN+		at Southern Illinois	L 49–53	11–5 (2–3)	14 – Wilkins	10 – Brodie	7 – Penn	Banterra Center (4,479); Carbondale, IL
January 7, 2023; 5:00 pm, ESPNU		Murray State	W 82–64	12–5 (3–3)	17 – Wilkins	11 – Sturtz	4 – Tied	Knapp Center (3,510); Des Moines, IA
January 10, 2023; 7:00 pm, ESPN+		at UIC	W 76–71 ^{OT}	13–5 (4–3)	15 – Tied	10 – Sturtz	8 – Penn	Credit Union 1 Arena (1,778); Chicago, IL
January 14, 2023; 7:00 pm, ESPNU		Bradley	W 86–61	14–5 (5–3)	28 – DeVries	10 – Penn	7 – Penn	Knapp Center (4,144); Des Moines, IA
January 18, 2023; 7:00 pm, MVC TV		Missouri State	L 62–65 ^{OT}	14–6 (5–4)	26 – DeVries	7 – Penn	2 – Penn	Knapp Center (2,518); Des Moines, IA
January 21, 2023; 3:00 pm, ESPN+		Evansville	W 97–61	15–6 (6–4)	23 – DeVries	11 – Sturtz	18 – Penn	Ford Center (4,404); Evansville, IN
January 24, 2023; 8:00 pm, CBSSN		Indiana State	W 70–68	16–6 (7–4)	21 – DeVries	10 – Sturtz	3 – Tied	Knapp Center (4,019); Des Moines, IA
January 29, 2023; 2:00 pm, ESPN2		at Belmont	W 79–61	17–6 (8–4)	16 – Tied	7 – Ferguson	7 – Penn	Curb Event Center (2,661); Nashville, TN
February 1, 2023; 8:00 pm, MVC TV		Northern Iowa	W 88–81 ^{2OT}	18–6 (9–4)	28 – Penn	13 – Sturtz	6 – Penn	Knapp Center (6,229); Des Moines, IA
February 4, 2023; 6:00 pm, ESPN+		at Valparaiso	W 85–82 ^{2OT}	19–6 (10–4)	32 – DeVries	12 – Penn	6 – Penn	Athletics–Recreation Center (3,137); Valparaiso, IN
February 7, 2023; 7:00 pm, ESPN+		at Murray State	W 92–68	20–6 (11–4)	32 – DeVries	11 – Sturtz	3 – Tied	CFSB Center (5,307); Murray, KY
February 11, 2023; 1:00 pm, ESPNU		Southern Illinois	W 82–59	21–6 (12–4)	21 – Penn	11 – Brodie	8 – Penn	Knapp Center (4,839); Des Moines, IA
February 15, 2023; 8:00 pm, MVC TV		at Northern Iowa	W 82–74	22–6 (13–4)	19 – DeVries	8 – Brodie	9 – Penn	McLeod Center (4,469); Cedar Falls, IA
February 19, 2023; 3:00 pm, CBSSN		Belmont	W 70–56	23–6 (14–4)	22 – Penn	9 – Brodie	4 – Penn	Knapp Center (4,753); Des Moines, IA
February 22, 2023; 7:00 pm, MC22		Illinois State	W 82–51	24–6 (15–4)	18 – DeVries	7 – Tied	4 – Enright	Knapp Center (3,818); Des Moines, IA
February 26, 2023; 3:00 pm, ESPN2		at Bradley	L 61–73	24–7 (15–5)	14 – Wilkins	6 – Penn	5 – Penn	Carver Arena (10,458); Peoria, IL
MVC Tournament
March 3, 2023; 6:00 pm, MVC TV	(2)	vs. (7) Murray State; Quarterfinals	W 74–62	25–7	27 – DeVries	6 – Ferguson	10 – Penn	Enterprise Center (7,049); St. Louis, MO
March 4, 2023; 5:00 pm, CBSSN	(2)	vs. (3) Southern Illinois; Semifinals	W 65–52	26–7	16 – Penn	17 – Brodie	5 – Penn	Enterprise Center (8,483); St. Louis, MO
March 5, 2023; 1:00 pm, CBS	(2)	vs. (1) Bradley; Championship	W 77–51	27–7	22 – DeVries	9 – Brodie	6 – Penn	Enterprise Center (6,706); St. Louis, MO
NCAA Tournament
March 17, 2023; 6:25 pm, TBS	(12 MW)	vs. (5 MW) No. 16 Miami (FL); First Round	L 56–63	27–8	20 – Brodie	9 – Brodie	7 – Penn	MVP Arena (13,989); Albany, NY
*Non-conference game. ^{#}Rankings from AP Poll. (#) Tournament seedings in parentheses. All times are in Central Time.

== Rankings ==
Ranking movements Legend: ██ Increase in ranking ██ Decrease in ranking — = Not ranked RV = Received votes
	Week																			
Poll	Pre	1	2	3	4	5	6	7	8	9	10	11	12	13	14	15	16	17	18	Final
AP	—	—	—	—	—	—	—	—	—	—	—	—	—	—	—	—	—	—	RV	Not released
Coaches	RV	RV	RV	RV	—	—	—	—	—	—	—	—	—	—	—	—	—	—	—	—
