= 2022–23 Illinois State Redbirds men's basketball team =

American college basketball season

2022–23 Illinois State Redbirds men's basketball
- Conference: Missouri Valley Conference
- Record: 11–21 (6–14 MVC)
- Head coach: Ryan Pedon (1st season)
- Assistant coaches: Walter Offut; Rob Judson; Andrew Dakich
- Home arena: Doug Collins Court at Redbird Arena

2022–23 Missouri Valley Conference men's basketball standings
	Conf.				Overall
Team	W		L	PCT	W		L	PCT
Bradley	16	–	4	.800	25	–	10	.714
Drake †	15	–	5	.750	27	–	8	.771
Southern Illinois	14	–	6	.700	23	–	10	.697
Belmont	14	–	6	.700	21	–	11	.656
Indiana State	13	–	7	.650	23	–	13	.639
Missouri State	12	–	8	.600	17	–	15	.531
Murray State	11	–	9	.550	17	–	15	.531
Northern Iowa	9	–	11	.450	14	–	18	.438
Illinois State	6	–	14	.300	11	–	21	.344
Valparaiso	5	–	15	.250	11	–	21	.344
UIC	4	–	16	.200	12	–	20	.375
Evansville	1	–	19	.050	5	–	27	.156
† 2023 MVC tournament winner

The 2022–23 Illinois State Redbirds men's basketball team represented Illinois State University during the 2022–23 NCAA Division I men's basketball season. The Redbirds played their home games at Doug Collins Court at Redbird Arena in Normal, Illinois as members of the Missouri Valley Conference. They were led by first-year head coach Ryan Pedon. They finished the season 11–20, 6–14 in MVC play to finish in ninth place. They lost to Northern Iowa in the opening round of the MVC tournament.

== Previous season ==
The Redbirds finished the 2021–22 season 13–20, 5–13 in MVC play to finish in eighth place. They defeated Indiana State in the first round of the MVC tournament before losing to Northern Iowa in the quarterfinals.

Head coach Dan Muller was fired by the school after the first 26 games of the season after 10 years as head coach, but the school stated he would finish out the season. A day later, Muller announced he would step down immediately and associate head coach Brian Jones was named interim coach for the remainder of the season. On March 7, 2022, the school named Ohio State assistant coach Ryan Pedon as the team's new head coach.

== Preseason ==
The Redbirds were picked to finish in 10th place in the conference's preseason poll.

== Roster ==
2022–23 Illinois State Redbirds men's basketball team
Players
Coaches

Pos.	#	Name	Height	Weight	Year	Previous school	Hometown
G	0	Luke Kasubke	6 ft 5 in (1.96 m)	190 lb (86 kg)	Jr	Kansas State	St. Louis, Missouri
G	1	Malachi Poindexter	6 ft 2 in (1.88 m)	190 lb (86 kg)	Jr	Virginia	Mineral, Virginia
G	3	Seneca Knight	6 ft 7 in (2.01 m)	210 lb (95 kg)	Sr	BYU	New Orleans, Louisiana
F	5	Alston Andrews	6 ft 9 in (2.06 m)	230 lb (104 kg)	Jr	Ocoee HS	Detroit, Michigan
G	10	Darius Burford	6 ft 0 in (1.83 m)	166 lb (75 kg)	Jr	Elon	Bolingbrook, Illinois
F	13	Liam McChesney	6 ft 10 in (2.08 m)	200 lb (91 kg)	RS Jr	Utah State	Prince Rupert, British Columbia
G	14	Nik Stadelman	6 ft 0 in (1.83 m)	185 lb (84 kg)	Jr	Guilford HS	Rockford, Illinois
G	15	Colton Sandage	6 ft 2 in (1.88 m)	190 lb (86 kg)	Sr	Western Illinois	Bloomington, Illinois
F	22	Kendall Lewis	6 ft 8 in (2.03 m)	210 lb (95 kg)	Sr	Appalachian State	Snellville, Georgia
F	23	Harouna Sissoko	6 ft 7 in (2.01 m)	215 lb (98 kg)	RS Jr	Grand View Christian School	Kayes, Mali
G	24	Jayden Johnson	6 ft 6 in (1.98 m)	210 lb (95 kg)	Jr	Batavia HS	Batavia, Illinois
F	25	Alex Kotov	6 ft 10 in (2.08 m)	230 lb (104 kg)	GS	Daytona State	Moscow, Russia
F	33	Joe Petrakis	6 ft 10 in (2.08 m)	224 lb (102 kg)	GS	Western Carolina	Wichita, Kansas
G	34	Malcolm Miller	6 ft 4 in (1.93 m)	210 lb (95 kg)	RS Jr	Shelbyville HS	Shelbyville, Illinois
F	50	Ryan Schmitt	6 ft 11 in (2.11 m)	225 lb (102 kg)	Sr	Des Moines Area CC	Van Meter, Iowa

Head coach

- Ryan Pedon (Wooster)

Assistant coach(es)

- Walter Offutt (Ohio)
- Rob Judson (Illinois)
- Andrew Dakich (Michigan)

Legend

- (C) Team captain
- (S) Suspended
- (I) Ineligible
- (W) Walk-on
- Injured
- Current redshirt

Roster
Last update: January 19, 2023

=== Incoming transfers ===
Name	Pos.	Height	Weight	Year	Hometown	Prior school
Darius Burford	G	6'0"	165	Junior	Bolingbrook, IL	Elon
Malachi Pondexter	G	6'2"	190	Junior	Mineral, VA	Virginia
Luke Kasubke	G	6'5"	190	Junior	St. Louis, MO	Kansas State
Seneca Knight	G	6'7"	210	Senior	New Orleans, LA	BYU
Colton Sandage	G	6'2"	190	Senior	Blommington, IL	Western Illinois
Joe Petrakis	F	6'10"	224	GS	Wichita, KS	Western Carolina

== Schedule and results ==
Date time, TV	Rank^{#}	Opponent^{#}	Result	Record	High points	High rebounds	High assists	Site (attendance) city, state
Exhibition Season
October 30, 2022*; 2:00 pm		Wooster	W 84–49		23 – Sandage	7 – Lewis	5 – Burford	Redbird Arena (1,010); Normal, IL
Regular Season
November 7, 2022*; 7:00 pm, Marquee/ESPN+		Western Illinois	L 68–71	0–1	22 – Lewis	14 – Lewis	1 – Burford, Knight, Petrakis, Poindexter	Redbird Arena (4,133); Normal, IL
November 10, 2022*; 7:00 pm, ESPN+		at Eastern Illinois	W 54–49	1–1	16 – Kasubke	14 – Lewis	2 – Burford, Kasubke, Lewis, Petrakis, Sandage	Lantz Arena (1,385); Charleston, IL
November 12, 2022*; 7:00 pm, ESPN+		at Northwestern State	W 69–67	2–1	24 – Lewis	13 – Lewis	6 – Kasubke	Prather Coliseum (1,295); Natchitoches, LA
November 17, 2022*; 7:00 pm, ESPN+		Northwestern State	L 67–70	2–2	20 – Burford	7 – Lewis	5 – Burford	Redbird Arena (3,098); Normal, IL
November 21, 2022*; 10:00 am, FloHoops		vs. LSU; Cayman Islands Classic; Quarterfinal	L 61–77	2–3	17 – Burford	7 – Knight	4 – Knight	John Gray Gymnasium (1,250); George Town, Cayman Islands
November 22, 2022*; 10:00 am, FloHoops		vs. Western Kentucky; Cayman Islands Classic; Consolation Semifinal	L 66–78	2–4	18 – Knight	8 – Knight	3 – Sandage	John Gray Gymnasium (1,200); George Town, Cayman Islands
November 23, 2022*; 10:00 am, FloHoops		vs. Rhode Island; Cayman Islands Classic; Seventh Place	L 44–57	2–5	14 – Lewis	7 – Knight, Lewis	3 – Burford	John Gray Gymnasium (2,400); George Town, Cayman Islands
December 1, 2022; 7:00 pm, ESPN+		at Murray State	L 67–70 ^{OT}	2–6 (0–1)	20 – Knight	12 – Knight	4 – Poindexter	CFSB Center (5,471); Murray, KY
December 4, 2022; 1:00 pm, MVC TV Network/ESPN+		Belmont	W 87–77	3–6 (1–1)	25 – McChesney	8 – Burford, McChesney	4 – Kasubke, Lewis, Poindexter	Redbird Arena (3,165); Normal, IL
December 7, 2022*; 7:00 pm, ESPN+		Eastern Michigan	W 87–81	4–6	28 – Sandage	10 – Lewis	5 – Knight	Redbird Arena (3,331); Normal, IL
December 10, 2022*; 3:00 pm, Marquee/ESPN+		SIU Edwardsville; Return to Horton	W 77–71	5–6	20 – Burford	7 – Knight, Lewis	3 – Knight	Horton Field House (3,420); Normal, IL
December 17, 2022*; 2:30 pm, ESPN+		vs. Ball State; Indy Classic	L 69–83	5–7	14 – Poindexter	7 – Lewis	2 – Burford, Petrakis, Poindexter	Gainbridge Fieldhouse (9,242); Indianapolis, IN
December 19, 2022*; 7:00pm, ESPN+		Chicago State	W 66–52	6–7	14 – Kasubke	8 – Knight	5 – Knight	Redbird Arena (2,964); Normal, IL
December 28, 2022; 7:00 pm, ESPN+		at UIC	L 51–55	6–8 (1–2)	10 – Burford	8 – Sissoko	3 – Burford	Credit Union 1 Arena (2,014); Chicago, IL
December 31, 2022; 2:00 pm, Marquee/ESPN+		Northern Iowa	L 60–66	6–9 (1–3)	22 – McChesney	8 – Knight	5 – Poindexter	Redbird Arena (3,208); Normal, IL
January 4, 2023; 7:00 pm, ESPN+		Indiana State	L 67–76	6–10 (1–4)	22 – Burford	5 – McChesney	3 – Lewis, Poindexter	Redbird Arena (2,832); Normal, IL
January 7, 2023; 1:00 pm, ESPN+		at Evansville	W 69–61	7–10 (2–4)	18 – Poindexter	7 – Lewis	6 – Burford	Ford Center (6,487); Evansville, IN
January 11, 2023; 7:00 pm, ESPN+		Missouri State	W 76–66 ^{OT}	8–10 (3–4)	22 – Knight	9 – Knight	1 – Burford, Kasubke, Knight, Lewis, Poindexter, Sandage	Redbird Arena (3,112); Normal, IL
January 14, 2023; 3:00 pm, ESPN3		at Southern Illinois	L 57–69	8–11 (3–5)	13 – McChesney	5 – Burford, Knight, McChesney	2 – Kasubke	Banterra Center (5,523); Carbondale, IL
January 18, 2023; 7:00 pm, ESPN+		at Northern Iowa	L 63–65	8–12 (3–6)	16 – Knight	7 – Knight	2 – Kasubke, Poindexter	McLeod Center (2,935); Cedar Falls, IA
January 21, 2023; 6:00 pm, ESPN3		Valparaiso	L 51–71	8–13 (3–7)	23 – Burford	7 – Lewis	3 – Poindexter	Redbird Arena (3,642); Normal, IL
January 25, 2023; 7:00 pm, MVC TV Network/ESPN+		at Bradley; I-74 Rivalry	L 75–79 ^{OT}	8–14 (3–8)	19 – Knight	12 – Lewis	3 – Burford, Kasubke	Carver Arena (6,046); Peoria, IL
January 29, 2023; 2:00 pm, ESPN+		Southern Illinois	W 72–66	9–14 (4–8)	24 – Knight	10 – Lewis	4 – Kasubke, Kotov	Redbird Arena (4,377); Normal, IL
February 1, 2023; 7:00 pm, Marquee/ESPN+		UIC	W 68–62 ^{OT}	10–14 (5–8)	18 – Burford	11 – Lewis	5 – Poindexter	Redbird Arena (3,409); Normal, IL
February 4, 2023; 4:00 pm, ESPN3		at Belmont	L 75–90	10–15 (5–9)	15 – Burford	5 – Lewis	5 – Burford	Curb Event Center (2,410); Nashville, TN
February 8, 2023; 7:00 pm, ESPN+		Bradley; I-74 Rivalry	L 61–79	10–16 (5–10)	15 – Poindexter	8 – Lewis	5 – Burford	Redbird Arena (5,374); Normal, IL
February 11, 2023; 6:00 pm, ESPN3		at Valparaiso	L 76–81	10–17 (5–11)	20 – Knight	6 – Lewis	5 – Burford	Athletics–Recreation Center (2,102); Valparaiso, IN
February 15, 2023; 7:00 pm, Marquee/ESPN+		Murray State	L 75–76	10–18 (5–12)	22 – Knight	9 – Lewis	6 – Burford	Redbird Arena (3,161); Normal, IL
February 18, 2023; 1:00 pm, ESPN3		at Indiana State	L 64–80	10–19 (5–13)	23 – Burford	12 – Lewis	2 – Burford	Hulman Center (5,862); Terre Haute, IN
February 22, 2023; 7:00 pm, ESPN+		at Drake	L 51–82	10–20 (5–14)	16 – Burford	11 – Knight	3 – Knight	The Knapp Center (3,818); Des Moines, IA
February 26, 2023; 2:00 pm, ESPN+		Evansville	W 72–53	11–20 (6–14)	26 – Knight	11 – Lewis	4 – Knight	Redbird Arena (3,415); Normal, IL
Conference Tournament
March 2, 2023; 12:00 pm, MVC TV Network/ESPN+	(9)	vs. (8) Northern Iowa; Arch Madness Opening Round	L 62–75	11–21	19 – Knight	10 – Lewis	6 – Poindexter	Enterprise Center (3,161); St. Louis, MO
*Non-conference game. ^{#}Rankings from AP Poll. (#) Tournament seedings in parentheses. All times are in Central Time.
