= 2022–23 Valparaiso Beacons men's basketball team =

American college basketball season

2022–23 Valparaiso Beacons men's basketball
- Conference: Missouri Valley Conference
- Record: 11–21 (5–15 MVC)
- Head coach: Matt Lottich (7th season)
- Associate head coach: Luke Gore
- Assistant coaches: Matt Bowen; Rob Holloway
- Home arena: Athletics–Recreation Center

2022–23 Missouri Valley Conference men's basketball standings
	Conf.				Overall
Team	W		L	PCT	W		L	PCT
Bradley	16	–	4	.800	25	–	10	.714
Drake †	15	–	5	.750	27	–	8	.771
Southern Illinois	14	–	6	.700	23	–	10	.697
Belmont	14	–	6	.700	21	–	11	.656
Indiana State	13	–	7	.650	23	–	13	.639
Missouri State	12	–	8	.600	17	–	15	.531
Murray State	11	–	9	.550	17	–	15	.531
Northern Iowa	9	–	11	.450	14	–	18	.438
Illinois State	6	–	14	.300	11	–	21	.344
Valparaiso	5	–	15	.250	11	–	21	.344
UIC	4	–	16	.200	12	–	20	.375
Evansville	1	–	19	.050	5	–	27	.156
† 2023 MVC tournament winner

The 2022–23 Valparaiso Beacons men's basketball team represented Valparaiso University in the 2022–23 NCAA Division I men's basketball season. The Beacons, led by seventh-year head coach Matt Lottich, played their home games at the Athletics–Recreation Center in Valparaiso, Indiana as members of the Missouri Valley Conference (MVC). They finished the season 11–20, 5–15 in MVC play, to finish in tenth place. They lost to Murray State in the opening round of the MVC tournament.

== Previous season ==
The Beacons finished the 2021–22 season 14–18, 6–12 in MVC play, to finish in seventh place. They defeated Evansville in the opening round of the MVC tournament, before falling to Missouri State in the quarterfinals.

== Roster ==
2022–23 Valparaiso Beacons men's basketball team
Players
Coaches

Pos.	#	Name	Height	Weight	Year	Previous school	Hometown
G	1	Cam Palesse	6 ft 2 in (1.88 m)	195 lb (88 kg)	RS Fr	Waukesha West HS	Waukesha, WI
G	2	Preston Ruedinger	6 ft 2 in (1.88 m)	185 lb (84 kg)	So	Lourdes Academy	Oshkosh, WI
G/F	3	Connor Barrett	6 ft 6 in (1.98 m)	205 lb (93 kg)	Jr	Loyola Academy	Chicago, IL
G	4	Darius DeAveiro	6 ft 0 in (1.83 m)	170 lb (77 kg)	So	Orangeville Prep	Kanata, ON
G	5	Nick Edwards	6 ft 1 in (1.85 m)	170 lb (77 kg)	Sr	Glenville State	Atlanta, GA
C	11	Emil Freese-Vilien	6 ft 10 in (2.08 m)	240 lb (109 kg)	Sr	Falkonergardens Gymnasium	Copenhagen, Denmark
F	12	Ibra Bayu	6 ft 8 in (2.03 m)	195 lb (88 kg)	Fr	Perkiomen School	Flevoland, Netherlands
F	13	Maximus Nelson	6 ft 8 in (2.03 m)	215 lb (98 kg)	Fr	Appleton North HS	Appleton, WI
G	14	Quinton Green	6 ft 7 in (2.01 m)	185 lb (84 kg)	Sr	Cedarville	Columbus, OH
G	15	Luke Morrill	6 ft 2 in (1.88 m)	195 lb (88 kg)	Sr	Montini Catholic HS	Lombard, IL
F	20	Joe Vick	6 ft 1 in (1.85 m)	190 lb (86 kg)	Fr	Kouts HS	Kouts, IN
F	23	Ben Krikke	6 ft 9 in (2.06 m)	235 lb (107 kg)	Sr	Jasper Place HS	Edmonton, AB
C	32	Joe Hedstrom	7 ft 0 in (2.13 m)	240 lb (109 kg)	RS Sr	Wisconsin	Hopkins, MN
F	33	Jerome Palm	6 ft 10 in (2.08 m)	215 lb (98 kg)	Jr	Hillsborough CC	Almere, Netherlands
G	35	Kobe King	6 ft 4 in (1.93 m)	195 lb (88 kg)	Sr	Wisconsin	La Crosse, WI

Head coach

- Matt Lottich (Stanford)

Assistant coach(es)

- Luke Gore (Bethel (TN))
- Matt Bowen (Indiana)
- Rob Holloway (Eastern Illinois)

Legend

- (C) Team captain
- (S) Suspended
- (I) Ineligible
- (W) Walk-on
- Injured
- Current redshirt

Roster
Last update: November 24, 2022

== Schedule and results ==
Date time, TV	Rank^{#}	Opponent^{#}	Result	Record	Site (attendance) city, state
Exhibition
October 29, 2022*; 12:00 p.m.		Cedarville	W 83–79	–	Athletics–Recreation Center (1,271); Valparaiso, IN
Regular season
November 7, 2022*; 6:00 p.m., ESPN3		at Toledo	L 70–85	0–1	Savage Arena (4,038); Toledo, OH
November 13, 2022*; 4:00 p.m., ESPN+		Western Michigan	W 81–65	1–1	Athletics–Recreation Center (1,680); Valparaiso, IN
November 16, 2022*; 7:00 p.m., FloHoops		at Chicago State	L 74–87	1–2	Jones Convocation Center (155); Chicago, IL
November 19, 2022*; 7:00 p.m., ESPN3		Incarnate Word	W 68–64	2–2	Athletics–Recreation Center (1,341); Valparaiso, IN
November 23, 2022*; 2:00 p.m., ESPN+		at Samford	L 49–79	2–3	Pete Hanna Center (1,735); Homewood, AL
November 25, 2022*; 12:30 p.m.		vs. South Dakota State; Hostilo Community Classic	L 50–61	2–4	Enmarket Arena (274); Savannah, GA
November 27, 2022*; 11:00 a.m.		vs. James Madison; Hostilo Community Classic	W 81–79 ^{OT}	3–4	Enmarket Arena (188); Savannah, GA
December 1, 2022; 7:00 p.m., ESPNU		at Belmont	L 64–76	3–5 (0–1)	Curb Event Center (2,056); Nashville, TN
December 4, 2022; 1:00 p.m., ESPN+		Murray State	L 70–77 ^{OT}	3–6 (0–2)	Athletics–Recreation Center (1,445); Valparaiso, IN
December 6, 2022*; 7:00 p.m., ESPN+		Trinity Christian	W 96–60	4–6	Athletics–Recreation Center (1,070); Valparaiso, IN
December 10, 2022*; 2:00 p.m., SECN		at Ole Miss	L 61–98	4–7	SJB Pavilion (5,517); Oxford, MS
December 18, 2022*; 1:00 p.m., ESPN+		Elon	W 71–66	5–7	Athletics–Recreation Center (1,057); Valparaiso, IN
December 21, 2022*; 12:00 p.m., ESPN+		Stonehill	W 77–67	6–7	Athletics–Recreation Center (1,617); Valparaiso, IN
December 29, 2022; 8:00 p.m., CBSSN		at Drake	L 63–68	6–8 (0–3)	Knapp Center (3,078); Des Moines, IA
January 1, 2023; 2:00 p.m., ESPN+		Indiana State	L 50–68	6–9 (0–4)	Athletics–Recreation Center (1,409); Valparaiso, IN
January 4, 2023; 6:00 p.m., ESPN+		Northern Iowa	L 67–69	6–10 (0–5)	Athletics–Recreation Center (915); Valparaiso, IN
January 7, 2023; 5:00 p.m., ESPN3		at Bradley	L 66–88	6–11 (0–6)	Carver Arena (4,476); Peoria, IL
January 10, 2023; 6:00 p.m., ESPN+		Belmont	L 59–74	6–12 (0–7)	Athletics–Recreation Center (1,543); Valparaiso, IN
January 14, 2023; 3:00 p.m., ESPN3		at Evansville	W 76–69	7–12 (1–7)	Ford Center (4,519); Evansville, IN
January 17, 2023; 6:00 p.m., ESPN+		UIC	W 76–66	8–12 (2–7)	Athletics–Recreation Center (1,850); Valparaiso, IN
January 21, 2023; 5:00 p.m., ESPN3		at Illinois State	W 71–51	9–12 (3–7)	CEFCU Arena (3,642); Normal, IL
January 25, 2023; 7:00 p.m., ESPN+		at Northern Iowa	L 66–77	9–13 (3–8)	McLeod Center (3,674); Cedar Falls, IA
January 28, 2023; 6:00 p.m., ESPN3		Evansville	W 81–69	10–13 (4–8)	Athletics–Recreation Center (1,969); Valparaiso, IN
February 1, 2023; 7:00 p.m., ESPN+		at Missouri State	L 67–76 ^{OT}	10–14 (4–9)	Great Southern Bank Arena (3,489); Springfield, MO
February 4, 2023; 5:00 p.m., ESPN+		Drake	L 82–85 ^{2OT}	10–15 (4–10)	Athletics–Recreation Center (3,137); Valparaiso, IN
February 8, 2023; 6:00 p.m., ESPN+		at Indiana State	L 62–84	10–16 (4–11)	Hulman Center (3,681); Terre Haute, IN
February 11, 2023; 1:00 p.m., ESPN3		Illinois State	W 81–76	11–16 (5–11)	Athletics–Recreation Center (2,102); Valparaiso, IN
February 14, 2023; 6:00 p.m., ESPN+		Southern Illinois	L 62–66	11–17 (5–12)	Athletics–Recreation Center (1,390); Valparaiso, IN
February 19, 2023; 1:00 p.m., ESPN+		at UIC	L 73–74	11–18 (5–13)	Credit Union 1 Arena (1,805); Chicago, IL
February 22, 2023; 6:00 p.m., NBCSCHI+/ESPN+		Bradley	L 66–76	11–19 (5–14)	Athletics–Recreation Center (1,848); Valparaiso, IN
February 25, 2023; 1:00 p.m., ESPN+		at Murray State	L 76–77 ^{OT}	11–20 (5–15)	CFSB Center (5,342); Murray, KY
MVC tournament
March 2, 2023; 6:00 p.m., MVC TV	(10)	vs. (7) Murray State; Opening round	L 50–78	11–21	Enterprise Center (3,564); St. Louis, MO
*Non-conference game. ^{#}Rankings from AP poll. (#) Tournament seedings in parentheses. All times are in Central.
