= 2022–23 Evansville Purple Aces men's basketball team =

American college basketball season

2022–23 Evansville Purple Aces men's basketball
- Conference: Missouri Valley Conference
- Record: 5–27 (1–19 MVC)
- Head coach: David Ragland (1st season)
- Assistant coaches: Craig Snow; Marcus Wilson; George Swanson
- Home arena: Ford Center

2022–23 Missouri Valley Conference men's basketball standings
| | Conf. | | | | Overall |
| Team | W | | L | PCT | W | | L | PCT |
|---|---|---|---|---|---|---|---|---|
| Bradley | 16 | – | 4 | .800 | 25 | – | 10 | .714 |
| Drake † | 15 | – | 5 | .750 | 27 | – | 8 | .771 |
| Southern Illinois | 14 | – | 6 | .700 | 23 | – | 10 | .697 |
| Belmont | 14 | – | 6 | .700 | 21 | – | 11 | .656 |
| Indiana State | 13 | – | 7 | .650 | 23 | – | 13 | .639 |
| Missouri State | 12 | – | 8 | .600 | 17 | – | 15 | .531 |
| Murray State | 11 | – | 9 | .550 | 17 | – | 15 | .531 |
| Northern Iowa | 9 | – | 11 | .450 | 14 | – | 18 | .438 |
| Illinois State | 6 | – | 14 | .300 | 11 | – | 21 | .344 |
| Valparaiso | 5 | – | 15 | .250 | 11 | – | 21 | .344 |
| UIC | 4 | – | 16 | .200 | 12 | – | 20 | .375 |
| Evansville | 1 | – | 19 | .050 | 5 | – | 27 | .156 |
† 2023 MVC tournament winner

The 2022–23 Evansville Purple Aces men's basketball team represented the University of Evansville in the 2022–23 NCAA Division I men's basketball season. The Purple Aces, led by first-year head coach David Ragland, played their home games at the Ford Center in Evansville, Indiana as members of the Missouri Valley Conference. They finished the season 5–27, 1–19 in MVC play to finish in last place. They lost to Indiana State in the first round of the MVC tournament.

== Previous season ==
The Purple Aces finished the 2021–22 season 6–24, 2–16 in MVC play to finish in tenth place. As the No. 10 seed, they lost to No. 7 seed Valparaiso in the opening round of the MVC tournament.

On May 5, the school announced the departure of head coach Todd Lickliter, after two full seasons as head coach. On May 24, it was announced that Evansville alum and Butler assistant coach David Ragland would be named the Purple Ace's next head coach.

== Roster ==
2022–23 Evansville Purple Aces men's basketball team
Players
Coaches

| Pos. | # | Name | Height | Weight | Year | Previous school | Hometown |
|---|---|---|---|---|---|---|---|
| G | 0 | Gage Bobe | 6 ft 0 in (1.83 m) | 175 lb (79 kg) | RS Sr | South Knox HS | Vincennes, IN |
| F | 1 | Antoine Smith Jr. | 6 ft 7 in (2.01 m) | — | Sr | Collin College | Westerville, OH |
| G | 2 | Matus Malovec | 6 ft 6 in (1.98 m) | — | Fr | Inter Bratislava | Bratislava, Slovakia |
| G | 4 | Marvin Coleman II | 6 ft 3 in (1.91 m) | 200 lb (91 kg) | Sr | UNLV | Las Vegas, NV |
| G | 5 | Zaveion Chism-Okoh | 6 ft 3 in (1.91 m) | — | Fr | Link Year Prep | Mount Pleasant, TX |
| F | 10 | Yacine Toumi | 6 ft 10 in (2.08 m) | 200 lb (91 kg) | Jr | Indian Hills CC | Meudon, France |
| G | 12 | Chris Moncrief | 6 ft 6 in (1.98 m) | — | Fr | The Kiski School | Pittsburgh, PA |
| G | 13 | Blaise Beauchamp | 6 ft 3 in (1.91 m) | 165 lb (75 kg) | Jr | Lincoln Trail College | Minnetonka, MN |
| G | 15 | Grant Tichenor | 6 ft 1 in (1.85 m) | 175 lb (79 kg) | So | Ohio County HS | Hartford, KY |
| G | 20 | Kenny Strawbridge Jr. | 6 ft 6 in (1.98 m) | 202 lb (92 kg) | RS Sr | Alabama State | Rockford, IL |
| G | 21 | Gabe Spinelli | 6 ft 2 in (1.88 m) | — | Fr | Darrow School | Watertown, MA |
| F | 22 | Sekou Kalle | 6 ft 10 in (2.08 m) | 224 lb (102 kg) | So | Akron | Louisville, KY |
| G | 23 | Cameron Gehlhausen | 6 ft 5 in (1.96 m) | — | Fr | Evansville North HS | Evansville, IN |
| F | 24 | Preston Phillips | 6 ft 8 in (2.03 m) | 190 lb (86 kg) | So | Don Bosco Institute | Elkhart, IN |
| G | 33 | Logan McIntire | 6 ft 4 in (1.93 m) | — | Fr | North Harrison HS | Ramsey, IN |

Head coach

- David Ragland (Evansville)

Assistant coach(es)

- Craig Snow (Evansville)
- Marcus Wilson (Evansville)
- George Swanson (Northwest)

Legend

- (C) Team captain
- (S) Suspended
- (I) Ineligible
- (W) Walk-on
- Injured
- Current redshirt

Roster
Last update: November 15, 2022

== Schedule and results ==
| Date time, TV | Rank^{#} | Opponent^{#} | Result | Record | Site (attendance) city, state |
Exhibition
| October 29, 2022*; 7:00 pm | | Oakland City | W 81–56 | – | Ford Center (3,461); Evansville, IN |
| November 2, 2022*; 7:00 pm | | Huntington | W 74–64 | – | Ford Center (3,217); Evansville, IN |
Regular season
| November 7, 2022*; 7:30 pm, ESPN3 | | at Miami (OH) | W 78–74 | 1–0 | Millett Hall (2,018); Oxford, OH |
| November 12, 2022*; 6:00 pm, ESPN+ | | at Saint Louis | L 65–83 | 1–1 | Chaifetz Arena (7,020); St. Louis, MO |
| November 16, 2022*; 7:00 pm, ESPN+ | | Southeast Missouri State | L 61–67 | 1–2 | Ford Center (3,756); Evansville, IN |
| November 19, 2022*; 2:00 pm, ESPN+ | | at SMU | L 47–55 | 1–3 | Moody Coliseum (3,397); University Park, TX |
| November 23, 2022*; 6:00 pm, ESPN+ | | at UCF | L 56–76 | 1–4 | Addition Financial Arena (3,751); Orlando, FL |
| November 25, 2022*; 5:30 pm | | vs. South Alabama; Hostilo Hoops Community Classic | L 67–78 | 1–5 | Enmarket Arena (219); Savannah, GA |
| November 26, 2022*; 4:00 pm | | vs. Robert Morris; Hostilo Hoops Community Classic | W 54–53 | 2–5 | Enmarket Arena (285); Savannah, GA |
| November 27, 2022*; 7:30 pm | | vs. Fairfield; Hostilo Hoops Community Classic | L 56–63 | 2–6 | Enmarket Arena (223); Savannah, GA |
| November 30, 2022; 7:00 pm, ESPN+ | | Southern Illinois | L 53–80 | 2–7 (0–1) | Ford Center (4,286); Evansville, IN |
| December 3, 2022; 1:00 pm, ESPN+ | | at Northern Iowa | L 55–72 | 2–8 (0–2) | McLeod Center (2,983); Cedar Falls, IA |
| December 7, 2022*; 7:00 pm, ESPN+ | | Campbell | W 72–66 | 3–8 | Ford Center (3,824); Evansville, IN |
| December 10, 2022*; 1:00 pm, ESPN+ | | at Ball State | L 69–88 | 3–9 | Worthen Arena (3,547); Muncie, IN |
| December 21, 2022*; 7:00 pm, ESPN+ | | Bellarmine | W 73–61 | 4–9 | Ford Center (4,603); Evansville, IN |
| December 29, 2022; 6:00 pm, ESPN+ | | at Indiana State | L 63–91 | 4–10 (0–3) | Hulman Center (3,453); Terre Haute, IN |
| January 1, 2023; 1:00 pm, ESPN+ | | Murray State | L 61–78 | 4–11 (0–4) | Ford Center (5,723); Evansville, IN |
| January 4, 2023; 7:00 pm, ESPN+ | | at Missouri State | L 62–85 | 4–12 (0–5) | Great Southern Bank Arena (2,567); Springfield, MO |
| January 7, 2023; 1:00 pm, ESPN+ | | Illinois State | L 61–69 | 4–13 (0–6) | Ford Center (6,487); Evansville, IN |
| January 11, 2023; 7:00 pm, ESPN+ | | at Bradley | L 46–91 | 4–14 (0–7) | Carver Arena (3,905); Peoria, IL |
| January 14, 2023; 3:00 pm, ESPN3 | | Valparaiso | L 69–76 | 4–15 (0–8) | Ford Center (4,519); Evansville, IN |
| January 17, 2023; 7:00 pm, ESPN+ | | at Southern Illinois | L 70–78 | 4–16 (0–9) | Banterra Center; Carbondale, IL |
| January 21, 2023; 3:00 pm, ESPN+ | | Drake | L 61–97 | 4–17 (0–10) | Ford Center (4,404); Evansville, IN |
| January 25, 2023; 7:00 pm, ESPN+ | | Belmont | L 64–73 | 4–18 (0–11) | Ford Center (4,227); Evansville, IN |
| January 28, 2023; 6:00 pm, ESPN3 | | at Valparaiso | L 69–81 | 4–19 (0–12) | Athletics–Recreation Center (1,969); Valparaiso, IN |
| February 1, 2023; 7:00 pm, ESPN+ | | Indiana State | L 65–83 | 4–20 (0–13) | Ford Center (4,699); Evansville, IN |
| February 4, 2023; 5:00 pm, ESPN+ | | at UIC | L 61–70 | 4–21 (0–14) | Credit Union 1 Arena (1,545); Chicago, IL |
| February 8, 2023; 7:00 pm, ESPN+ | | Northern Iowa | W 71–59 | 5–21 (1–14) | Ford Center (4,094); Evansville, IN |
| February 12, 2023; 1:00 pm, ESPN+ | | Missouri State | L 60–66 | 5–22 (1–15) | Ford Center (4,412); Evansville, IN |
| February 15, 2023; 6:30 pm, ESPN+ | | at Belmont | L 63–95 | 5–23 (1–16) | Curb Event Center (1,841); Nashville, TN |
| February 18, 2023; 3:00 pm, ESPN3 | | at Murray State | L 58–74 | 5–24 (1–17) | CFSB Center (5,437); Murray, KY |
| February 22, 2023; 7:00 pm, ESPN+ | | UIC | L 76–82 | 5–25 (1–18) | Ford Center (4,085); Evansville, IN |
| February 26, 2023; 1:00 pm, ESPN+ | | at Illinois State | L 53–72 | 5–26 (1–19) | CEFCU Arena (3,415); Normal, IL |
MVC tournament
| March 2, 2023; 2:30 pm, MVC TV | (12) | vs. (5) Indiana State; Opening round | L 58–97 | 5–27 | Enterprise Center (3,161); St. Louis, MO |
*Non-conference game. ^{#}Rankings from AP Poll. (#) Tournament seedings in parentheses. All times are in Central.
