= 2022–23 UIC Flames men's basketball team =

American college basketball season

2022–23 UIC Flames men's basketball
- Conference: Missouri Valley Conference
- Record: 12–20 (4–16 MVC)
- Head coach: Luke Yaklich (3rd season)
- Assistant coaches: Will Veasley (3rd season); Bill Wuczynski (2nd season); C.J. Rivers (1st season)
- Home arena: Credit Union 1 Arena

2022–23 Missouri Valley Conference men's basketball standings
	Conf.				Overall
Team	W		L	PCT	W		L	PCT
Bradley	16	–	4	.800	25	–	10	.714
Drake †	15	–	5	.750	27	–	8	.771
Southern Illinois	14	–	6	.700	23	–	10	.697
Belmont	14	–	6	.700	21	–	11	.656
Indiana State	13	–	7	.650	23	–	13	.639
Missouri State	12	–	8	.600	17	–	15	.531
Murray State	11	–	9	.550	17	–	15	.531
Northern Iowa	9	–	11	.450	14	–	18	.438
Illinois State	6	–	14	.300	11	–	21	.344
Valparaiso	5	–	15	.250	11	–	21	.344
UIC	4	–	16	.200	12	–	20	.375
Evansville	1	–	19	.050	5	–	27	.156
† 2023 MVC tournament winner

The 2022–23 UIC Flames men's basketball team represented the University of Illinois at Chicago in the 2022–23 NCAA Division I men's basketball season. The Flames, led by third-year head coach Luke Yaklich, played their home games at Credit Union 1 Arena in Chicago, Illinois as first-year members of the Missouri Valley Conference. They finished the season 12–19, 4–16 in MVC play to finish in eleventh place. They lost to Missouri State in the opening round of the MVC tournament.

== Previous season ==
The Flames finished the 2021–22 season 14–16, 9–10 in Horizon League play to finish in eighth place. In the Horizon League tournament, they beat Milwaukee in the first round before losing to Purdue Fort Wayne in the quarterfinals.

The season marked the Flames' final year in the Horizon League as the school announced it would join the MVC following the season.

== Offseason ==
=== Departures ===
Departures
Name	Pos.	Height	Weight	Year	Hometown	Notes
Jamie Ahale	G	6'5	205	Senior	Montrose, Australia	Graduated
Damaria Franklin	G	6'3	205	Senior	Chicago, IL	Transferred to Memphis
Zion Griffin	F	6'6"	215	Senior	Darien, IL	Transferred to Tennessee State

=== Incoming transfers ===
Transfers
Name	Pos.	Height	Weight	Year	Hometown	Previous school
Tre Anderson	G	6'1	185	Graduate Student	Tacoma, WA	Idaho
Toby Okani	G	6'8	210	Junior	Orange, NJ	Duquesne
Shaun Williams	G	6'4	190	Redshirt Senior	St. Louis, MO	Cal State Bakersfield

=== 2022 recruiting class ===
College recruiting information
Name	Hometown	School	Height	Weight	Commit date
Steven Clay; SG	Menomonee Falls, WI	Menomonee Falls High School	6 ft 4 in (1.93 m)	165 lb (75 kg)	Apr 18, 2022
Steven Clay; SG	Recruit ratings: Rivals: 247Sports: (NR)				
Cameron Fens; C	Dubuque, IA	Hempstead High School	6 ft 10 in (2.08 m)	255 lb (116 kg)	Apr 18, 2022
Cameron Fens; C	Recruit ratings: Scout: Rivals: (NR)				
Jalen Jackson; PG	Fort Wayne, IN	Northrop High School	6 ft 2 in (1.88 m)	200 lb (91 kg)	Sep 15, 2021
Jalen Jackson; PG	Recruit ratings: Scout: Rivals: 247Sports:				
Christian Jones; PG	East St. Louis, IL	East St. Louis High School	6 ft 5 in (1.96 m)	185 lb (84 kg)	May 20, 2022
Christian Jones; PG	Recruit ratings: Scout: Rivals: 247Sports: (79)				
Bessanty-Aime Saragba; C	Marseilles, France	Trinity Collegiate School	6 ft 10 in (2.08 m)	N/A	Aug 19, 2022
Bessanty-Aime Saragba; C	Recruit ratings: Rivals: 247Sports: (NR)				
Overall recruit ranking:
Note: In many cases, Scout, Rivals, 247Sports, On3, and ESPN may conflict in their listings of height and weight.; In these cases, the average was taken. ESPN grades are on a 100-point scale.; Sources: "2022 Team Ranking". Rivals.

== Preseason ==
The Flames were picked to finish in 11th place in the conference's preseason poll.

== Roster ==
2022–23 UIC Flames men's basketball team
Players
Coaches

Pos.	#	Name	Height	Weight	Year	Hometown
G	0	Jace Carter	6 ft 5 in (1.96 m)	210 lb (95 kg)	So	Titusville, Florida
G	1	Jalen Jackson	6 ft 2 in (1.88 m)	200 lb (91 kg)	Fr	Fort Wayne, Indiana
G	2	Steven Clay	6 ft 4 in (1.93 m)	185 lb (84 kg)	Fr	Milwaukee, Wisconsin
G	4	Tre Anderson	6 ft 1 in (1.85 m)	185 lb (84 kg)	GS	Tacoma, Washington
G	5	Toby Okani	6 ft 8 in (2.03 m)	210 lb (95 kg)	Jr	Orange, New Jersey
G	10	Christian Jones	6 ft 5 in (1.96 m)	185 lb (84 kg)	Fr	East St. Louis, Illinois
G	15	Griffin Yaklich (W)	6 ft 6 in (1.98 m)	200 lb (91 kg)	Jr	Joliet, Illinois
G	22	Shaun Williams	6 ft 4 in (1.93 m)	190 lb (86 kg)	RS Sr	St. Louis, Missouri
F	33	Jaden Bronwell	6 ft 9 in (2.06 m)	230 lb (104 kg)	RS Fr	Sandy, Utah
C	42	Bessanty-Aime Saragba	6 ft 10 in (2.08 m)	215 lb (98 kg)	Fr	Marseille, France
F	50	Filip Skobalj	6 ft 7 in (2.01 m)	240 lb (109 kg)	So	Belgrade, Serbia
C	54	Cameron Fens	6 ft 10 in (2.08 m)	255 lb (116 kg)	Fr	Dubuque, Iowa

Head coach

- Luke Yaklich (Illinois State)

Assistant coach(es)

- Will Veasley (Butler)
- Bill Wuczynski (UNLV)
- C.J. Rivers (Drake)

Legend

- (C) Team captain
- (S) Suspended
- (I) Ineligible
- (W) Walk-on
- Injured
- Current redshirt

Roster
Last update: August 30, 2022

== Schedule and results ==
Date time, TV	Rank^{#}	Opponent^{#}	Result	Record	High points	High rebounds	High assists	Site (attendance) city, state
Exhibition
November 1, 2022*; 7:00 pm		Illinois Tech	W 90–52	–	20 – Anderson	7 – Tied	–	Credit Union 1 Arena; Chicago, IL
Regular season
November 7, 2022*; 7:00 pm, ESPN3		Trinity Christian	W 82–48	1–0	13 – Carter	13 – Okani	6 – Jones	Credit Union 1 Arena (1,177); Chicago, IL
November 11, 2022*; 7:00 pm, ESPN+		Loyola–Chicago	L 63–70	1–1	20 – Anderson	6 – Fens	3 – Anderson	Credit Union 1 Arena (3,550); Chicago, IL
November 14, 2022*; 7:00 pm, ESPN+		Jacksonville State	W 67–60	2–1	22 – Carter	10 – Carter	5 – Anderson	Credit Union 1 Arena (1,019); Chicago, IL
November 19, 2022*; 4:00 p.m., ESPN+		vs. Fordham; Tom Konchalski Classic	L 65–79	2–2	21 – Okani	8 – Carter	3 – Jackson	Rose Hill Gymnasium; Bronx, NY
November 21, 2022*; 3:00 p.m.		vs. Stonehill; Tom Konchalski Classic	W 77–71	3–2	28 – Carter	7 – Carter	7 – Anderson	Rose Hill Gymnasium; Bronx, NY
November 22, 2022*; 3:00 p.m.		vs. Holy Cross; Tom Konchalski Classic	W 89–66	4–2	20 – Okani	13 – Okani	7 – Anderson	Rose Hill Gymnasium; Bronx, NY
November 26, 2022*; 6:00 pm, ESPN+		at Green Bay	W 78–64	5–2	25 – Anderson	8 – Okani	5 – Anderson	Kress Events Center (1,200); Green Bay, WI
November 30, 2022; 7:00 p.m., ESPN+		Missouri State	L 51–66	5–3 (0–1)	15 – Carter	12 – Okani	4 – Anderson	Credit Union 1 Arena (1,174); Chicago, IL
December 3, 2022; 5:00 p.m., ESPN+		at Drake	L 64–77	5–4 (0–2)	18 – Carter	12 – Okani	5 – Anderson	Knapp Center (2,860); Des Moines, IA
December 10, 2022*; 1:30 p.m., ESPN3		at Western Michigan	W 62–56	6–4	18 – Carter	6 – Okani	4 – Anderson	University Arena (1,682); Kalamazoo, MI
December 13, 2022*; 7:00 pm, ESPN+		Prairie View A&M	W 70–61	7–4	16 – Okani	6 – Okani	6 – Okani	Credit Union 1 Arena (1,081); Chicago, IL
December 18, 2022*; 1:00 pm, ESPN+		Northeastern	W 81–73	8–4	22 – Carter	6 – Okani	4 – Tied	Credit Union 1 Arena (1,218); Chicago, IL
December 20, 2022*; 8:00 pm, BTN		at Northwestern	L 54–92	8–5	12 – Okani	6 – Carter	3 – Tied	Welsh–Ryan Arena (3,704); Evanston, IL
December 28, 2022; 7:00 pm, ESPN+		Illinois State	W 55–51	9–5 (1–2)	18 – Okani	7 – Tied	4 – Carter	Credit Union 1 Arena (2,014); Chicago, IL
December 31, 2022; 1:00 pm, ESPN+		at Bradley	L 45–79	9–6 (1–3)	17 – Carter	8 – Okani	2 – Okani	Carver Arena (4,890); Peoria, IL
January 4, 2023; 7:00 pm, ESPN+		Belmont	L 71–77	9–7 (1–4)	21 – Carter	8 – Okani	6 – Jackson	Credit Union 1 Arena (1,194); Chicago, IL
January 7, 2023; 1:00 pm, ESPN3		at Indiana State	L 60–80	9–8 (1–5)	12 – Skobalj	7 – Carter	4 – Anderson	Hulman Center (3,463); Terre Haute, IN
January 10, 2023; 7:00 pm, ESPN+		Drake	L 71–76 ^{OT}	9–9 (1–6)	19 – Okani	8 – Carter	6 – Skobalj	Credit Union 1 Arena (1,778); Chicago, IL
January 14, 2023; 3:00 pm, ESPN3		at Murray State	L 64–81	9–10 (1–7)	18 – Carter	5 – Tied	3 – Tied	CFSB Center (5,417); Murray, KY
January 17, 2023; 6:00 pm, ESPN+		at Valparaiso	L 66–76	9–11 (1–8)	29 – Okani	11 – Okani	7 – Jones	Athletics–Recreation Center (1,850); Valparaiso, IN
January 21, 2023; 7:00 pm, ESPN3		Northern Iowa	L 72–78	9–12 (1–9)	27 – Anderson	8 – Okani	7 – Anderson	Credit Union 1 Arena (2,312); Chicago, IL
January 24, 2023; 7:00 pm, ESPN+		at Missouri State	L 59–63	9–13 (1–10)	19 – Carter	6 – Okani	4 – Carter	Great Southern Bank Arena (3,026); Springfield, MO
January 29, 2023; 1:00 pm, ESPN+		Bradley	L 76–83	9–14 (1–11)	25 – Carter	10 – Carter	5 – Tied	Credit Union 1 Arena (2,240); Chicago, IL
February 1, 2023; 7:00 pm, ESPN+		at Illinois State	L 62–68 ^{OT}	9–15 (1–12)	29 – Anderson	4 – 4 tied	3 – 3 tied	CEFCU Arena (3,409); Normal, IL
February 4, 2023; 7:00 pm, ESPN+		Evansville	W 70–61	10–15 (2–12)	17 – Clay	12 – Carter	4 – Tied	Credit Union 1 Arena (1,545); Chicago, IL
February 8, 2023; 7:00 pm, ESPN+		at Southern Illinois	L 66–68	10–16 (2–13)	17 – Carter	9 – Carter	4 – Tied	Banterra Center; Carbondale, IL
February 11, 2023; 1:00 pm, ESPN3		at Belmont	L 71–98	10–17 (2–14)	21 – Jackson	6 – Okani	3 – Tied	Curb Event Center (2,341); Nashville, TN
February 15, 2023; 7:00 pm, ESPN+		Indiana State	L 60–79	10–18 (2–15)	23 – Jackson	8 – Okani	6 – Okani	Credit Union 1 Arena (2,102); Chicago, IL
February 19, 2023; 1:00 pm, ESPN+		Valparaiso	W 74–73	11–18 (3–15)	19 – Jackson	9 – Carter	6 – Anderson	Credit Union 1 Arena (1,805); Chicago, IL
February 22, 2023; 7:00 pm, ESPN+		at Evansville	W 82–76	12–18 (4–15)	22 – Carter	8 – Carter	6 – Anderson	Ford Center (4,085); Evansville, IN
February 26, 2023; 1:00 pm, ESPN+		Southern Illinois	L 65–68	12–19 (4–16)	22 – Carter	14 – Okani	5 – Skobalj	Credit Union 1 Arena (2,502); Chicago, IL
Missouri Valley tournament
March 2, 2023; 8:30 pm, MVC TV	(11)	vs. (6) Missouri State; Opening round	L 57–74	12–20	14 – Carter	8 – Okani	4 – Skobalj	Enterprise Center (3,564); St. Louis, MO
*Non-conference game. ^{#}Rankings from AP Poll. (#) Tournament seedings in parentheses. All times are in Central Time Zone.
