= 2022–23 Missouri Valley Conference men's basketball season =

- League: NCAA Division I
- Sport: Basketball
- Teams: 12
- TV partner(s): CBS, CBSSN, FOX, FS1, FSN

Regular Season

Tournament

Basketball seasons
- ← 2021–22 2023–24 →

2022–23 Missouri Valley Conference men's basketball standings
	Conf.				Overall
Team	W		L	PCT	W		L	PCT
Bradley	16	–	4	.800	25	–	10	.714
Drake †	15	–	5	.750	27	–	8	.771
Southern Illinois	14	–	6	.700	23	–	10	.697
Belmont	14	–	6	.700	21	–	11	.656
Indiana State	13	–	7	.650	23	–	13	.639
Missouri State	12	–	8	.600	17	–	15	.531
Murray State	11	–	9	.550	17	–	15	.531
Northern Iowa	9	–	11	.450	14	–	18	.438
Illinois State	6	–	14	.300	11	–	21	.344
Valparaiso	5	–	15	.250	11	–	21	.344
UIC	4	–	16	.200	12	–	20	.375
Evansville	1	–	19	.050	5	–	27	.156
† 2023 MVC tournament winner

The 2022–23 Missouri Valley Conference men's basketball season began with practices in October 2022, followed by the start of the 2022–23 NCAA Division I men's basketball season in November. Conference play began in December and ended in February.

The season was the first with 12 teams in the conference with Belmont, Murray State and UIC joining the conference. Loyola Chicago left the conference following the prior season to join the Atlantic 10 Conference.

== Preseason ==
=== Preseason poll ===
The preseason awards and coaches' poll was released by the league office on October 18, 2022.

Rank	Team
1.	Drake (52)
2.	Bradley (1)
3.	Southern Illinois
4.	Missouri State
5.	Northern Iowa
6.	Belmont
7.	Indiana State
8.	Murray State
9.	Valparaiso
10.	Illinois State
11.	UIC
12.	Evansville
(first-place votes)

=== Preseason All-Missouri Valley teams ===
Honor	Recipient
Preseason All-MVC First Team	Tucker Devries, Drake
Preseason All-MVC First Team	Marcus Domask, Southern Illinois
Preseason All-MVC First Team	Ben Krikke, Valparaiso
Preseason All-MVC First Team	Rienk Mast, Bradley
Preseason All-MVC First Team	Roman Penn, Drake
Preseason All-MVC First Team	Ben Sheppard, Belmont
Preseason All-MVC Second Team	Bowne Born, Northern Iowa
Preseason All-MVC Second Team	Donovan Clay, Missouri State
Preseason All-MVC Second Team	Lance Jones, Southern Illinois
Preseason All-MVC Second Team	Cooper Neese, Indiana State
Preseason All-MVC Second Team	Garrett Sturtz, Drake
Preseason All-MVC Third Team	Marcus Domask, Southern Illinois
Preseason All-MVC Third Team	Kobe King, Valparaiso
Preseason All-MVC Third Team	Rob Perry, Murray State
Preseason All-MVC Third Team	Austin Phyfe, Northern Iowa
Preseason All-MVC Third Team	D.J. Wilkins, Drake
