= 2022–23 Southern Illinois Salukis men's basketball team =

American college basketball season

2022–23 Southern Illinois Salukis men's basketball
- Conference: Missouri Valley Conference
- Record: 23–10 (14–6 MVC)
- Head coach: Bryan Mullins (4th season)
- Assistant coaches: Brendan Mullins; Pat Monaghan; Jevon Mamon
- Home arena: Banterra Center

2022–23 Missouri Valley Conference men's basketball standings
| | Conf. | | | | Overall |
| Team | W | | L | PCT | W | | L | PCT |
|---|---|---|---|---|---|---|---|---|
| Bradley | 16 | – | 4 | .800 | 25 | – | 10 | .714 |
| Drake † | 15 | – | 5 | .750 | 27 | – | 8 | .771 |
| Southern Illinois | 14 | – | 6 | .700 | 23 | – | 10 | .697 |
| Belmont | 14 | – | 6 | .700 | 21 | – | 11 | .656 |
| Indiana State | 13 | – | 7 | .650 | 23 | – | 13 | .639 |
| Missouri State | 12 | – | 8 | .600 | 17 | – | 15 | .531 |
| Murray State | 11 | – | 9 | .550 | 17 | – | 15 | .531 |
| Northern Iowa | 9 | – | 11 | .450 | 14 | – | 18 | .438 |
| Illinois State | 6 | – | 14 | .300 | 11 | – | 21 | .344 |
| Valparaiso | 5 | – | 15 | .250 | 11 | – | 21 | .344 |
| UIC | 4 | – | 16 | .200 | 12 | – | 20 | .375 |
| Evansville | 1 | – | 19 | .050 | 5 | – | 27 | .156 |
† 2023 MVC tournament winner

The 2022–23 Southern Illinois Salukis men's basketball team represented Southern Illinois University Carbondale during the 2022–23 NCAA Division I men's basketball season. The Salukis were led by fourth-year head coach Bryan Mullins and played their home games at the Banterra Center in Carbondale, Illinois as members of the Missouri Valley Conference. They finished the season 22–9, 14–6 in MVC Play to tie for 3rd place. In the MVC tournament, they defeated Missouri State in the quarterfinals before falling to eventual tournament champions Drake in the semifinals.

== Previous season ==
The Salukis finished the 2021–22 season 16–15, 9–9 in MVC play to finish in sixth place. They lost in the quarterfinals of the MVC tournament to Drake.

== Roster ==
2022–23 Southern Illinois Salukis men's basketball team
Players
Coaches

| Pos. | # | Name | Height | Weight | Year | Previous school | Hometown |
|---|---|---|---|---|---|---|---|
| G | 0 | Foster Wonders | 6 ft 5 in (1.96 m) | 205 lb (93 kg) | RS Fr | Iron Mountain High School | Iron Mountain, MI |
| F | 1 | Marcus Domask | 6 ft 6 in (1.98 m) | 215 lb (98 kg) | Sr | Waupun High School | Waupun, WI |
| C | 2 | Scottie Ebube | 6 ft 10 in (2.08 m) | 265 lb (120 kg) | RS Fr | Mundelein High School | Mundelein, IL |
| G | 3 | Dalton Banks | 6 ft 2 in (1.88 m) | 185 lb (84 kg) | Jr | North High School | Eau Clair, WI |
| F | 4 | Clarence Rupert | 6 ft 8 in (2.03 m) | 245 lb (111 kg) | So | Saint Peter's | Philadelphia PA |
| G | 5 | Lance Jones | 6 ft 1 in (1.85 m) | 190 lb (86 kg) | Sr | Evanston Township | Evanston, IL |
| G | 10 | Xavier Johnson | 6 ft 1 in (1.85 m) | 185 lb (84 kg) | Sr | George Mason | Germantown, MD |
| F | 11 | J.D. Muila | 6 ft 8 in (2.03 m) | 240 lb (109 kg) | Sr | Indian Hills Community College | Ottawa, ON |
| G | 12 | Chris Cross | 6 ft 2 in (1.88 m) | 195 lb (88 kg) | Sr | Urbana High School | Urbana, IL |
| G | 13 | Jawaun Newton | 6 ft 3 in (1.91 m) | 185 lb (84 kg) | Sr | Evansville | El Paso, TX |
| G | 14 | AJ Ferguson | 6 ft 5 in (1.96 m) | 185 lb (84 kg) | So | East Central | Houston, TX |
| G | 15 | JR Jacobs | 5 ft 9 in (1.75 m) | 155 lb (70 kg) | Fr | Bartlett High School | Memphis, TN |
| C | 21 | Cade Hornecker | 7 ft 0 in (2.13 m) | 240 lb (109 kg) | Fr | Amarillo High School | Amarillo, TX |
| F | 23 | Troy D'Amico | 6 ft 7 in (2.01 m) | 210 lb (95 kg) | So | Notre Dame College Prep | Chicago, IL |
| G | 24 | Trent Brown | 6 ft 2 in (1.88 m) | 185 lb (84 kg) | Sr | Pinnacle High School | Scottsdale, AZ |

Head coach

- Bryan Mullins (Southern Illinois)

Assistant coach(es)

- Brendan Mullins (Saint Michael's)
- Pat Monaghan (Lewis)
- Jevon Marmon (Barat College)

Legend

- (C) Team captain
- (S) Suspended
- (I) Ineligible
- (W) Walk-on
- Injured
- Current redshirt

Roster

== Schedule and results ==
| Date time, TV | Rank^{#} | Opponent^{#} | Result | Record | Site city, state |
Exhibition
| October 29, 2022*; 2:00 pm | | at No. 20 Alabama; Charity Exhibition | L 64–73 | | Foster Auditorium (2,000); Tuscaloosa, AL |
Regular season
| November 7, 2022*; 7:00 pm, ESPN3 | | Little Rock | W 94–63 | 1–0 | Banterra Center (5,109); Carbondale, IL |
| November 10, 2022*; 7:00 pm, ESPN+ | | at Oklahoma State | W 61–60 | 2–0 | Gallagher-Iba Arena (5,324); Stillwater, OK |
| November 13, 2022*; 3:00 pm, ESPN+ | | at Southern Indiana | L 53–71 | 2–1 | Screaming Eagles Arena (3,071); Evansville, IN |
| November 17, 2022*; 7:00 pm, ESPN+ | | Tennessee State; 2022 SoCal Challenge campus game | W 57–44 | 3–1 | Banterra Center (3,780); Carbondale, IL |
| November 21, 2022*; 12:00 am, CBSSN | | vs. UNLV; SoCal Challenge Surf Division semifinals | L 49–56 | 3–2 | The Pavilion at JSerra; San Juan Capistrano, CA |
| November 23, 2022*; 12:00 am, CBSSN | | vs. California Baptist; SoCal Challenge Surf Division 3rd Place Game | W 64–61 ^{OT} | 4–2 | The Pavilion at JSerra (300); San Juan Capistrano, CA |
| November 30, 2022; 7:00 pm, ESPN+ | | at Evansville | W 80–53 | 5–2 (1–0) | Ford Center (4,286); Evansville, IN |
| December 3, 2022*; 3:00 pm, BSMW | | at Saint Louis | L 72–85 | 5–3 | Chaifetz Arena (7,024); St. Louis, MO |
| December 7, 2022; 7:00 pm, ESPN+ | | Indiana State | L 71–74 | 5–4 (1–1) | Banterra Center (4,126); Carbondale, IL |
| December 10, 2022*; 7:00 pm, ESPN3 | | Alcorn State | W 74–68 | 6–4 | Banterra Center (4,121); Carbondale, IL |
| December 13, 2022*; 7:00 pm, ESPN+ | | Lincoln | W 88–51 | 7–4 | Banterra Center (3,958); Carbondale, IL |
| December 16, 2022*; 7:00 pm, ESPN+ | | Chicago State | W 63–52 | 8–4 | Banterra Center (3,924); Carbondale, IL |
| December 21, 2022*; 6:30 pm, ESPN+ | | at Southeast Missouri State | W 70–68 | 9–4 | Show Me Center (1,632); Cape Girardeau, MO |
| December 29, 2022; 7:00 pm, ESPN+ | | at Murray State | W 63–57 | 10–4 (2–1) | CFSB Center (5,571); Murray, KY |
| January 1, 2023; 4:00 pm, ESPNU | | Belmont | W 63–45 | 11–4 (3–1) | Banterra Center (7,119); Carbondale, IL |
| January 4, 2023; 7:00 pm, ESPN+ | | Drake | W 53–49 | 12–4 (4–1) | Banterra Center (4,479); Carbondale, IL |
| January 7, 2023; 1:00 pm, ESPN3 | | at Northern Iowa | L 57–69 | 12–5 (4–2) | McLeod Center (3,391); Cedar Falls, IA |
| January 11, 2023; 6:00 pm, ESPN+ | | at Indiana State | W 69–61 | 13–5 (5–2) | Hulman Center (5,152); Terre Haute, IN |
| January 14, 2023; 7:00 pm, ESPN3 | | Illinois State | W 69–57 | 14–5 (6–2) | Banterra Center (5,523); Carbondale, IL |
| January 17, 2023; 7:00 pm, ESPN+ | | Evansville | W 78–70 | 15–5 (7–2) | Banterra Center (4,492); Carbondale, IL |
| January 21, 2023; 1:00 pm, ESPN3 | | at Missouri State | W 61–57 | 16–5 (8–2) | Great Southern Bank Arena (3,782); Springfield, MO |
| January 24, 2023; 7:00 pm, ESPN+ | | Murray State | W 68–64 | 17–5 (9–2) | Banterra Center (6,507); Carbondale, IL |
| January 29, 2023; 2:00 pm, ESPN+ | | at Illinois State | L 66–72 | 17–6 (9–3) | CEFCU Arena (4,377); Normal, IL |
| February 1, 2023; 7:00 pm, ESPN+ | | at Bradley | L 52–62 | 17–7 (9–4) | Carver Arena (4,817); Peoria, IL |
| February 5, 2023; 1:00 pm, BSMW | | Missouri State | W 73–53 | 18–7 (10–4) | Banterra Center (5,802); Carbondale, IL |
| February 8, 2023; 7:00 pm, ESPN+ | | UIC | W 68–66 | 19–7 (11–4) | Banterra Center (4,864); Carbondale, IL |
| February 11, 2023; 2:00 pm, ESPNU | | at Drake | L 59–82 | 19–8 (11–5) | Knapp Center (4,839); Des Moines, IA |
| February 14, 2023; 6:00 pm, ESPN+ | | at Valparaiso | W 66–62 | 20–8 (12–5) | Athletics–Recreation Center (1,390); Valparaiso, IN |
| February 19, 2023; 1:00 pm, ESPN2 | | Bradley | L 48–50 | 20–9 (12–6) | Banterra Center (6,516); Carbondale, IL |
| February 22, 2023; 7:00 pm, ESPN+ | | Northern Iowa | W 86–63 | 21–9 (13–6) | Banterra Center (5,101); Carbondale, IL |
| February 26, 2023; 1:00 pm, BSMW | | at UIC | W 68–65 | 22–9 (14–6) | Credit Union 1 Arena (2,502); Chicago, IL |
MVC Tournament
| March 3, 2023; 8:30 pm, BSMW | (3) | vs. (6) Missouri State; Quarterfinals | W 54–51 | 23–9 | Enterprise Center (7,049); St. Louis, MO |
| March 4, 2023; 5:00 pm, CBSSN | (3) | vs. (2) Drake; Semifinals | L 52–65 | 23–10 | Enterprise Center (8,483); St. Louis, MO |
*Non-conference game. ^{#}Rankings from AP Poll. (#) Tournament seedings in parentheses. All times are in Central Time.
