= 2023 Missouri Valley Conference men's basketball tournament =

- Classification: Division I
- Season: 2022–23
- Teams: 12
- Site: Enterprise Center; St. Louis, Missouri
- Champions: Drake (2nd title)
- Winning coach: Darian DeVries (2nd title)
- Television: CBS, CBSSN, MVC TV Network

The 2023 Missouri Valley Conference Men's Basketball Tournament, popularly referred to as "Arch Madness", was a postseason men's basketball tournament that completed the 2022–23 season in the Missouri Valley Conference. The tournament was held at the Enterprise Center in St. Louis, Missouri from March 2–5, 2023.

For the first time, the tournament featured 12 teams. Belmont, Murray State, and UIC joined the conference in 2022 following Loyola Chicago's exit.

2022–23 Missouri Valley Conference men's basketball standings
	Conf.				Overall
Team	W		L	PCT	W		L	PCT
Bradley	16	–	4	.800	25	–	10	.714
Drake †	15	–	5	.750	27	–	8	.771
Southern Illinois	14	–	6	.700	23	–	10	.697
Belmont	14	–	6	.700	21	–	11	.656
Indiana State	13	–	7	.650	23	–	13	.639
Missouri State	12	–	8	.600	17	–	15	.531
Murray State	11	–	9	.550	17	–	15	.531
Northern Iowa	9	–	11	.450	14	–	18	.438
Illinois State	6	–	14	.300	11	–	21	.344
Valparaiso	5	–	15	.250	11	–	21	.344
UIC	4	–	16	.200	12	–	20	.375
Evansville	1	–	19	.050	5	–	27	.156
† 2023 MVC tournament winner

== Seeds ==
Teams are seeded by conference record, with ties broken by the overall record in conference games played between the tied teams, then (if necessary) by comparison of records between the tying institutions versus the top team in the standings (and continuing from top to bottom of standings, as necessary, with the team having the better record against that team receiving the better seed). The top four seeds receive opening–round byes.

Seed	School	Conference	Tiebreaker 1
1	Bradley	16–4	
2	Drake	15–5	
3	Southern Illinois	14–6	1–0 vs. Belmont
4	Belmont	14–6	0–1 vs. Southern Illinois
5	Indiana State	13–7	
6	Missouri State	12–8	
7	Murray State	11–9	
8	Northern Iowa	9–11	
9	Illinois State	6–14	
10	Valparaiso	5–15	
11	UIC	4–16	
12	Evansville	1–19	

== Schedule ==
Game	Time *	Matchup	Score	Television
Opening round – Thursday, March 2
1	12:00 pm	No. 8 Northern Iowa vs. No. 9 Illinois State	75–62	MVC TV Network
2	2:30 pm	No. 5 Indiana State vs. No. 12 Evansville	97–58	MVC TV Network
3	6:00 pm	No. 7 Murray State vs. No. 10 Valparaiso	78–50	MVC TV Network
4	8:30 pm	No. 6 Missouri State vs. No. 11 UIC	74–57	MVC TV Network
Quarterfinals – Friday, March 3
5	12:00 pm	No. 1 Bradley vs. No. 8 Northern Iowa	72–66	MVC TV Network
6	2:30 pm	No. 4 Belmont vs. No. 5 Indiana State	91–94	MVC TV Network
7	6:00 pm	No. 2 Drake vs. No. 7 Murray State	74–62	MVC TV Network
8	8:30 pm	No. 3 Southern Illinois vs. No. 6 Missouri State	54–51	MVC TV Network
Semifinals – Saturday, March 4
9	2:30 pm	No. 1 Bradley vs. No. 5 Indiana State	71–70	CBSSN
10	5:00 pm	No. 2 Drake vs. No. 3 Southern Illinois	65–52	CBSSN
Final – Sunday, March 5
11	1:00 pm	No. 1 Bradley vs. No. 2 Drake	51–77	CBS
* Game times in CST; rankings denote tournament seed.

== Bracket ==
First round Thursday, March 2 MVC TV Network
8	Northern Iowa	75
9	Illinois State	62
5	Indiana State	97
12	Evansville	58
7	Murray State	78
10	Valparaiso	50
6	Missouri State	74
11	UIC	57

Quarterfinals; Friday, March 3 MVC TV Network
1	Bradley	72
8	Northern Iowa	66
4	Belmont	91
5	Indiana State	94
2	Drake	74
7	Murray State	62
3	Southern Illinois	54
6	Missouri State	51

Semifinals; Saturday, March 4 CBSSN
1	Bradley	71
5	Indiana State	70
2	Drake	65
3	Southern Illinois	52

Championship; Sunday, March 5 CBS
1	Bradley	51
2	Drake	77
