= 2022–23 Murray State Racers men's basketball team =

American college basketball season

2022–23 Murray State Racers men's basketball
- Conference: Missouri Valley Conference
- Record: 17–15 (11–9 MVC)
- Head coach: Steve Prohm (1st in current stint, 5th overall season)
- Assistant coaches: Cole Christian; Antwon Jackson; Jonathan Mattox
- Home arena: CFSB Center

2022–23 Missouri Valley Conference men's basketball standings
	Conf.				Overall
Team	W		L	PCT	W		L	PCT
Bradley	16	–	4	.800	25	–	10	.714
Drake †	15	–	5	.750	27	–	8	.771
Southern Illinois	14	–	6	.700	23	–	10	.697
Belmont	14	–	6	.700	21	–	11	.656
Indiana State	13	–	7	.650	23	–	13	.639
Missouri State	12	–	8	.600	17	–	15	.531
Murray State	11	–	9	.550	17	–	15	.531
Northern Iowa	9	–	11	.450	14	–	18	.438
Illinois State	6	–	14	.300	11	–	21	.344
Valparaiso	5	–	15	.250	11	–	21	.344
UIC	4	–	16	.200	12	–	20	.375
Evansville	1	–	19	.050	5	–	27	.156
† 2023 MVC tournament winner

The 2022–23 Murray State Racers men's basketball team represented Murray State University in the 2022–23 NCAA Division I men's basketball season. The Racers were led by head coach Steve Prohm, who was in his first season (fifth overall) with the Racers, and played their home games at the CFSB Center in Murray, Kentucky as first-year members of the Missouri Valley Conference. They finished the season 16–14, 11–9 in MVC play to finish in sixth place. They defeated Valparaiso in the opening round of the MVC tournament before losing to Drake in the quarterfinals.

== Previous season ==
The Racers finished the 2021–22 season 31–3, 18–0 in OVC play to finish as regular season champions. As the No. 1 seed, they defeated Southeast Missouri State and Morehead State to win the OVC tournament. They received the conference's automatic bid to the NCAA tournament as the No. 7 seed in the East Region, where they defeated San Francisco in the first round, before losing to Saint Peter's in the second round.

On March 21, 2022, head coach Matt McMahon left the school to take the head coaching job at LSU. On March 28, the school named former Iowa State head coach Steve Prohm as the team's new head coach, who previously coached the Racers from 2006 to 2011 as an assistant and as head coach from 2011 to 2015.

The season was the team's last season as members of the Ohio Valley Conference, as they joined the Missouri Valley Conference in July 2022.

== Roster ==
2022–23 Murray State Racers men's basketball team
Players
Coaches

Pos.	#	Name	Height	Weight	Year	Previous school	Hometown
G	0	Jaxon Edwards	6 ft 6 in (1.98 m)	195 lb (88 kg)	Fr	Cathedral HS	Indianapolis, Indiana
G	1	Braxton Stacker	6 ft 5 in (1.96 m)	185 lb (84 kg)	Fr	Cardinal Ritter College Prep HS	Fairview Heights, Illinois
G	2	Rob Perry	6 ft 4 in (1.93 m)	210 lb (95 kg)	Jr	Oak Ridge HS; Stetson	Orlando, Florida
G	4	Patrick Chew	6 ft 4 in (1.93 m)	195 lb (88 kg)	Fr	Brophy College Prep HS	Phoenix, Arizona
G	10	Quincy Anderson	6 ft 4 in (1.93 m)	205 lb (93 kg)	Jr	North Oshkosh HS; Minnesota State-Mankato	Oshkosh, Wisconsin
G	11	Justin Morgan	6 ft 6 in (1.98 m)	215 lb (98 kg)	Fr	Memphis Home School Association	Memphis, Tennessee
G	13	Kenny White Jr.	6 ft 7 in (2.01 m)	225 lb (102 kg)	So	Madisonville-North Hopkins HS; Tennessee Tech	Madisonville, Kentucky
G	14	Brian Moore Jr.	6 ft 3 in (1.91 m)	180 lb (82 kg)	So	Kingston HS; Northeastern Oklahoma A&M	Harlem, New York
F	22	Sam Murray II	6 ft 8 in (2.03 m)	190 lb (86 kg)	Fr	Harrison Central HS	Gulfport, Mississippi
G	24	JaCobi Wood	6 ft 2 in (1.88 m)	185 lb (84 kg)	So	Cleveland HS; Belmont	Cleveland, Tennessee
G	25	Rod Thomas	6 ft 0 in (1.83 m)	195 lb (88 kg)	Sr	Paducah Tilghman HS	Paducah, Kentucky
F	35	Marlon Lestin	6 ft 9 in (2.06 m)	230 lb (104 kg)	So	Halton Prep HS; East Carolina	Montreal, Quebec
F	52	Jamari Smith	6 ft 8 in (2.03 m)	225 lb (102 kg)	Jr	Jonesboro HS; Queens	Jonesboro, Georgia
F	55	DJ Burns	6 ft 7 in (2.01 m)	220 lb (100 kg)	Jr	Sophie B. Wright HS; Southern	New Orleans, Louisiana

Head coach

- Steve Prohm (Alabama)

Assistant coach(es)

- Cole Christian (Iowa State)
- Antwon Jackson (Pikeville)
- Jonathan Mattox (Emmanuel)

Legend

- (C) Team captain
- (S) Suspended
- (I) Ineligible
- (W) Walk-on
- Injured
- Current redshirt

Roster
Last update: October 31, 2022

== Schedule and results ==
Date time, TV	Rank^{#}	Opponent^{#}	Result	Record	Site (attendance) city, state
Exhibition
November 2, 2022*; 7:00 pm, ESPN+		Brescia	W 102–57	–	CFSB Center (3,449); Murray, KY
Regular season
November 7, 2022*; 7:00 pm, BSMWX/ESPN+		at Saint Louis	L 68–91	0–1	Chaifetz Arena (7,253); St. Louis, MO
November 12, 2022*; 7:00 pm, ESPN+		Lindsey Wilson	W 90–53	1–1	CFSB Center (4,457); Murray, KY
November 17, 2022*; 3:00 pm, ESPN2		vs. No. 24 Texas A&M; Myrtle Beach Invitational quarterfinals	W 88–79	2–1	HTC Center (1,321); Conway, SC
November 18, 2022*; 1:30 pm, ESPN2		vs. UMass; Myrtle Beach Invitational semifinals	L 69–71	2–2	HTC Center (1,393); Conway, SC
November 20, 2022*; 9:30 am, ESPNU		vs. Tulsa; Myrtle Beach Invitational 3rd place game	W 77–60	3–2	HTC Center (1335); Conway, SC
November 26, 2022*; 6:00 pm, ESPN+		at Chattanooga	L 66–69	3–3	McKenzie Arena (2,934); Chattanooga, TN
December 1, 2022; 7:00 pm, ESPN+		Illinois State	W 70–67 ^{OT}	4–3 (1–0)	CFSB Center (5,471); Murray, KY
December 4, 2022; 1:00 pm, ESPN+		at Valparaiso	W 77–70 ^{OT}	5–3 (2–0)	Athletics–Recreation Center (1,445); Valparaiso, IN
December 10, 2022*; 3:00 pm, ESPN+		at Bellarmine	L 58–69	5–4	Freedom Hall (2,853); Louisville, KY
December 13, 2022*; 7:00 pm, ESPN+		Chicago State	W 66–65	6–4	CFSB Center (3,823); Murray, KY
December 16, 2022*; 7:00 pm, ESPN+		Austin Peay	W 68–60	7–4	CFSB Center (5,131); Murray, KY
December 21, 2022*; 6:00 pm, ESPN+		at Middle Tennessee	L 67–83	7–5	Murphy Center (2,857); Murfreesboro, TN
December 29, 2022; 7:00 pm, ESPN+		Southern Illinois	L 57–63	7–6 (2–1)	CFSB Center (5,571); Murray, KY
January 1, 2023; 1:00 pm, ESPN+		at Evansville	W 78–61	8–6 (3–1)	Ford Center (5,723); Evansville, IN
January 4, 2023; 7:00 pm, ESPN+		Bradley	W 67–58	9–6 (4–1)	CFSB Center (3,891); Murray, KY
January 7, 2023; 5:00 pm, ESPNU		at Drake	L 64–82	9–7 (4–2)	Knapp Center (3,510); Des Moines, IA
January 10, 2023; 7:00 pm, ESPN+		at Northern Iowa	L 67–75	9–8 (4–3)	McLeod Center (3,201); Cedar Falls, IA
January 14, 2023; 3:00 pm, BSMWX/ESPN3		UIC	W 81–64	10–8 (5–3)	CFSB Center (5,417); Murray, KY
January 17, 2023; 8:00 pm, CBSSN		at Belmont	L 65–80	10–9 (5–4)	Curb Event Center (2,507); Nashville, TN
January 21, 2023; 5:00 pm, ESPNU		Indiana State	W 82–73	11–9 (6–4)	CFSB Center (6,006); Murray, KY
January 24, 2023; 7:00 pm, ESPN+		at Southern Illinois	L 64–68	11–10 (6–5)	Banterra Center (6,507); Carbondale, IL
January 28, 2023; 1:00 pm, MVCN		Missouri State	W 74–71	12–10 (7–5)	CFSB Center (6,712); Murray, KY
February 1, 2023; 7:00 pm, ESPN+		Belmont	W 83–82	13–10 (8–5)	CFSB Center (5,271); Murray, KY
February 4, 2023; 3:00 pm, CBSSN		at Indiana State	L 56–99	13–11 (8–6)	Hulman Center (4,672); Terre Haute, IN
February 7, 2023; 7:00 pm, ESPN+		Drake	L 68–92	13–12 (8–7)	CFSB Center (5,307); Murray, KY
February 11, 2023; 1:00 pm, ESPN3		at Bradley	L 48–78	13–13 (8–8)	Carver Arena (6,213); Peoria, IL
February 15, 2023; 7:00 pm, ESPN+		at Illinois State	W 76–75	14–13 (9–8)	CEFCU Arena (3,161); Normal, IL
February 18, 2023; 3:00 pm, ESPN+		Evansville	W 74–58	15–13 (10–8)	CFSB Center (5,437); Murray, KY
February 21, 2023; 6:00 pm, CBSSN		at Missouri State	L 69–84	15–14 (10–9)	Great Southern Bank Arena (3,684); Springfield, MO
February 26, 2023; 3:00 pm, ESPN+		Valparaiso	W 77–76 ^{OT}	16–14 (11–9)	CFSB Center (5,342); Murray, KY
MVC Tournament
March 2, 2023; 6:00 pm, MVC TV	(7)	vs. (10) Valparaiso; Opening round	W 78–50	17–14	Enterprise Center (3,564); St. Louis, MO
March 3, 2023; 6:00 pm, MVC TV	(7)	vs. (2) Drake; Quarterfinals	L 62–74	17–15	Enterprise Center; St. Louis, MO
*Non-conference game. ^{#}Rankings from AP Poll. (#) Tournament seedings in parentheses. All times are in Central.
