= 2022–23 Indiana State Sycamores men's basketball team =

American college basketball season

2022–23 Indiana State Sycamores men's basketball

CBI, Quarterfinals
- Conference: Missouri Valley Conference
- Record: 23–13 (13–7 MVC)
- Head coach: Josh Schertz (2nd season)
- Associate head coach: Matthew Graves
- Assistant coaches: Bryston Williams; Justin Furr
- Home arena: Hulman Center

2022–23 Missouri Valley Conference men's basketball standings
	Conf.				Overall
Team	W		L	PCT	W		L	PCT
Bradley	16	–	4	.800	25	–	10	.714
Drake †	15	–	5	.750	27	–	8	.771
Southern Illinois	14	–	6	.700	23	–	10	.697
Belmont	14	–	6	.700	21	–	11	.656
Indiana State	13	–	7	.650	23	–	13	.639
Missouri State	12	–	8	.600	17	–	15	.531
Murray State	11	–	9	.550	17	–	15	.531
Northern Iowa	9	–	11	.450	14	–	18	.438
Illinois State	6	–	14	.300	11	–	21	.344
Valparaiso	5	–	15	.250	11	–	21	.344
UIC	4	–	16	.200	12	–	20	.375
Evansville	1	–	19	.050	5	–	27	.156
† 2023 MVC tournament winner

The 2022–23 Indiana State Sycamores men's basketball team represented Indiana State University in the 2022–23 NCAA Division I men's basketball season. The Sycamores, led by second-year head coach Josh Schertz, played their home games at the Hulman Center in Terre Haute, Indiana as members of the Missouri Valley Conference.

The Fightin' Trees reached the ArchMadness Semi-finals for their best finish since the 2020–21 season. Senior guard Cooper Neese was named to the All-ArchMadness team; Neese scored 63 points for the Tourney, raising his career ArchMadness scoring total to 84 points (10.5 ppg, 8 games). Courvoisier McCauley was named MVC Newcomer of the Year. McCauley also made the All-Conference Second Team and All-Newcomer Team.

McCauley is the third Sycamore all-time to be named MVC Newcomer of the Year; earlier Sycamore honorees are John Sherman Williams (1983) and Eddie Bird (1988). Other Sycamores who received MVC honors include: Cameron Henry (All-Conference Third Team), Robbie Avila (All-Freshman Team), and Julian Larry (All-Defensive Team).

The Sycamores finished the season 20–11, 13–7 in MVC play to finish in fifth place. They defeated Evansville and Belmont in the MVC tournament before losing to Bradley in the semifinals. The Sycamores received an invitation to the CBI, where they were awarded the overall No. 1 seed. They defeated USC Upstate in the first round before being narrowly defeated in overtime in the second round by Eastern Kentucky, closing their season with an overall record of 23–13.

== Previous season ==
The Sycamores finished the 2021–22 season 11–20, 4–14 in MVC play to finish in ninth place. They lost to Illinois State in the opening round of the MVC tournament.

== Roster ==
2022–23 Indiana State Sycamores men's basketball team
Players
Coaches

Pos.	#	Name	Height	Weight	Year	Previous school	Hometown
G	0	Xavier Bledson	6 ft 6 in (1.98 m)	215 lb (98 kg)	RS Jr	Lincoln Memorial	Gainesville, GA
G	1	Julian Larry	6 ft 3 in (1.91 m)	185 lb (84 kg)	So	iSchool Entrepreneurial Academy	Frisco, TX
G	2	Rob Martin	5 ft 10 in (1.78 m)	160 lb (73 kg)	Fr	Christian Brothers HS	St. Louis, MO
F	3	Kailex Stephens	6 ft 7 in (2.01 m)	214 lb (97 kg)	Sr	Tallahassee CC	Tuscaloosa, AL
G	4	Cooper Neese	6 ft 4 in (1.93 m)	185 lb (84 kg)	Sr	Cloverdale HS	Cloverdale, IN
G	5	Cameron Crawford	6 ft 5 in (1.96 m)	175 lb (79 kg)	So	Spain Park HS	Hoover, AL
G	10	Jaden Schertz	5 ft 11 in (1.8 m)	165 lb (75 kg)	Fr	Cumberland Gap HS	Harrogate, TN
G	12	Masen Miller	6 ft 2 in (1.88 m)	180 lb (82 kg)	So	Truman State	Iowa City, IA
G	13	Isaac Holmes	6 ft 6 in (1.98 m)	200 lb (91 kg)	Fr	Apex Friendship HS	Apex, NC
G	15	Cameron Henry	6 ft 6 in (1.98 m)	210 lb (95 kg)	RS Sr	Lincoln Memorial	Chesterfield, VA
G/F	20	Jayson Kent	6 ft 8 in (2.03 m)	205 lb (93 kg)	So	Bradley	Oak Forest, IL
C	21	Robbie Avila	6 ft 10 in (2.08 m)	240 lb (109 kg)	Fr	Oak Forest HS	Oak Forest, IL
G	23	Courvoisier McCauley	6 ft 5 in (1.96 m)	211 lb (96 kg)	GS	DePaul	Indianapolis, IN
G	24	Zach Hobbs	6 ft 5 in (1.96 m)	190 lb (86 kg)	Jr	Des Moines Area CC	Mesa, AZ
G	25	Trenton Gibson	6 ft 4 in (1.93 m)	200 lb (91 kg)	GS	Tusculum	Murfreesboro, TN
F	40	Cade McKnight	6 ft 9 in (2.06 m)	240 lb (109 kg)	GS	Truman State	Grinnell, IA

Head coach

- Josh Schertz (Florida Atlantic)

Assistant coach(es)

- Matthew Graves (Butler)
- Bryston Williams (Northwest Missouri State)
- Justin Furr (Wingate)

Legend

- (C) Team captain
- (S) Suspended
- (I) Ineligible
- (W) Walk-on
- Injured
- Current redshirt

Roster
Last update: November 15, 2022

== Schedule and results ==
Date time, TV	Rank^{#}	Opponent^{#}	Result	Record	Site (attendance) city, state
Exhibition
November 1, 2022*; 7:00 pm		Tusculum	W 86–53	–	Hulman Center (2,420); Terre Haute, IN
Regular season
November 7, 2022*; 7:00 pm, ESPN3		Green Bay	W 80–53	1–0	Hulman Center (2,739); Terre Haute, IN
November 12, 2022*; 2:00 pm, ESPN+		Ball State	W 83–71	2–0	Hulman Center (3,610); Terre Haute, IN
November 17, 2022*; 7:00 pm, ESPN+		North Dakota State	W 101–75	3–0	Hulman Center (3,002); Terre Haute, IN
November 21, 2022*; 1:30 pm, FloHoops		vs. East Carolina; Gulf Coast Showcase first round	W 79–75	4–0	Hertz Arena (516); Estero, FL
November 22, 2022*; 5:00 p.m., FloHoops		vs. Kansas City; Gulf Coast Showcase semifinals	L 61–63	4–1	Hertz Arena (356); Estero, FL
November 23, 2022*; 5:00 p.m., FloHoops		vs. Drexel; Gulf Coast Showcase 3rd-place game	W 85–81	5–1	Hertz Arena (265); Estero, FL
November 27, 2022*; 2:00 pm, ESPN+		Trinity Christian	W 105–68	6–1	Hulman Center (2,437); Terre Haute, IN
November 30, 2022; 7:00 pm, ESPN+		Drake	W 75–73	7–1 (1–0)	Hulman Center (3,459); Terre Haute, IN
December 3, 2022*; 1:00 pm, ESPN3		at Miami (OH)	W 88–61	8–1	Millett Hall (1,284); Oxford, OH
December 7, 2022; 8:00 pm, ESPN+		at Southern Illinois	W 74–71	9–1 (2–0)	Banterra Center (4,126); Carbondale, IL
December 11, 2022*; 4:00 pm, ESPN+		at Southern Indiana	L 85–88 ^{OT}	9–2	Screaming Eagles Arena (2,989); Evansville, IN
December 17, 2022*; 2:00 pm, ESPN+		at Duquesne	L 86–92	9–3	UPMC Cooper Fieldhouse (2,277); Pittsburgh, PA
December 22, 2022*; 1:00 pm, ESPN+		Northern Illinois	L 57–67	9–4	Hulman Center (2,607); Terre Haute, IN
December 29, 2022; 7:00 pm, ESPN+		Evansville	W 91–63	10–4 (3–0)	Hulman Center (3,453); Terre Haute, IN
January 1, 2023; 3:00 pm, ESPN+		at Valparaiso	W 68–50	11–4 (4–0)	Athletics–Recreation Center (1,409); Valparaiso, IN
January 4, 2023; 8:00 pm, ESPN+		at Illinois State	W 76–67	12–4 (5–0)	CEFCU Arena (2,832); Normal, IL
January 7, 2023; 2:00 pm, ESPN3		UIC	W 80–60	13–4 (6–0)	Hulman Center (2,759); Terre Haute, IN
January 11, 2023; 7:00 pm, ESPN+		Southern Illinois	L 61–69	13–5 (6–1)	Hulman Center (5,152); Terre Haute, IN
January 15, 2023; 3:00 pm, ESPN+		at Missouri State	L 62–64	13–6 (6–2)	Great Southern Bank Arena (3,210); Springfield, MO
January 18, 2023; 7:00 pm, ESPN+		Bradley	L 67–78	13–7 (6–3)	Hulman Center (4,038); Terre Haute, IN
January 21, 2023; 4:00 pm, ESPN+		at Murray State	L 73–82	13–8 (6–4)	CFSB Center (6,006); Murray, KY
January 24, 2023; 9:00 pm, CBSSN		at Drake	L 68–70	13–9 (6–5)	Knapp Center (4,019); Des Moines, IA
January 28, 2023; 2:00 pm, ESPN3		Northern Iowa	W 79–71	14–9 (7–5)	Hulman Center (4,419); Terre Haute, IN
February 1, 2023; 8:00 pm, ESPN+		at Evansville	W 83–65	15–9 (8–5)	Ford Center (4,699); Evansville, IN
February 4, 2023; 2:00 pm, CBSSN		Murray State	W 99–56	16–9 (9–5)	Hulman Center (4,672); Terre Haute, IN
February 8, 2023; 7:00 pm, ESPN+		Valparaiso	W 84–62	17–9 (10–5)	Hulman Center (3,681); Terre Haute, IN
February 11, 2023; 2:00 pm, ESPN3		at Northern Iowa	W 80–62	18–9 (11–5)	McLeod Center (4,174); Cedar Falls, IA
February 15, 2023; 8:00 pm, ESPN+		at UIC	W 79–60	19–9 (12–5)	Credit Union 1 Arena (2,102); Chicago, IL
February 18, 2023; 2:00 pm, ESPN+		Illinois State	W 80–64	20–9 (13–5)	Hulman Center (5,862); Terre Haute, IN
February 22, 2023; 7:30 pm, ESPN+		at Belmont	L 88–89	20–10 (13–6)	Curb Event Center (2,568); Nashville, TN
February 26, 2023; 2:00 pm, ESPN+		Missouri State	L 62–66	20–11 (13–7)	Hulman Center (4,993); Terre Haute, IN
MVC Tournament
March 2, 2023; 2:30 pm, MVC TV	(5)	vs. (12) Evansville; Opening round	W 97–58	21–11	Enterprise Center (3,161); St. Louis, MO
March 3, 2023; 2:30 pm, MVC TV	(5)	vs. (4) Belmont; Quarterfinals	W 94–91	22–11	Enterprise Center; St. Louis, MO
March 4, 2023; 2:30 pm, CBSSN	(5)	vs. (1) Bradley; Semifinals	L 70–71	22–12	Enterprise Center; St. Louis, MO
College Basketball Invitational
March 18, 2023; 12:00 p.m., FloHoops	(1)	vs. (16) USC Upstate; First round	W 67–62	23–12	Ocean Center; Daytona Beach, FL
March 20, 2023; 12:00 p.m., FloHoops	(1)	vs. (8) Eastern Kentucky; Quarterfinals	L 88–89 ^{OT}	23–13	Ocean Center; Daytona Beach, FL
*Non-conference game. ^{#}Rankings from AP Poll. (#) Tournament seedings in parentheses. All times are in Eastern.
