= 2022–23 Belmont Bruins men's basketball team =

American college basketball season

2022–23 Belmont Bruins men's basketball
- Conference: Missouri Valley Conference
- Record: 21–11 (14–6 MVC)
- Head coach: Casey Alexander (4th season)
- Associate head coach: Brian Ayers
- Assistant coaches: Sean Rutigliano; Tyler Holloway
- Home arena: Curb Event Center

2022–23 Missouri Valley Conference men's basketball standings
	Conf.				Overall
Team	W		L	PCT	W		L	PCT
Bradley	16	–	4	.800	25	–	10	.714
Drake †	15	–	5	.750	27	–	8	.771
Southern Illinois	14	–	6	.700	23	–	10	.697
Belmont	14	–	6	.700	21	–	11	.656
Indiana State	13	–	7	.650	23	–	13	.639
Missouri State	12	–	8	.600	17	–	15	.531
Murray State	11	–	9	.550	17	–	15	.531
Northern Iowa	9	–	11	.450	14	–	18	.438
Illinois State	6	–	14	.300	11	–	21	.344
Valparaiso	5	–	15	.250	11	–	21	.344
UIC	4	–	16	.200	12	–	20	.375
Evansville	1	–	19	.050	5	–	27	.156
† 2023 MVC tournament winner

The 2022–23 Belmont Bruins men's basketball team represented Belmont University in the 2022–23 NCAA Division I men's basketball season. The Bruins, led by fourth-year head coach Casey Alexander, played their home games at the Curb Event Center in Nashville, Tennessee as first-year members of the Missouri Valley Conference. They finished the season 21–10, 14–6 in MVC Play to finish in a tie for third place. They were defeated by Indiana State in the quarterfinals of the MVC tournament.

== Previous season ==
The Bruins finished the 2020–21 season 25–8, 15–3 in OVC play to finish in second place. They lost in the semifinals of the OVC tournament to Morehead State. They received an invite to the National Invitation Tournament where they lost to Vanderbilt in the first round.

The season marked the school's final season as members of the Ohio Valley Conference.

== Preseason ==
The Bruins were picked to finish in sixth place in the conference's preseason poll. Guard Ben Sheppard was named to the preseason All-MVC first team.

== Roster ==
2022–23 Belmont Bruins men's basketball team
Players
Coaches

Pos.	#	Name	Height	Weight	Year	Hometown
C	0	Even Brauns	6 ft 9 in (2.06 m)	240 lb (109 kg)	Jr	Iowa City, Iowa
G	1	Isaiah Walker	6 ft 5 in (1.96 m)	190 lb (86 kg)	Fr	Wyoming, Ohio
G	2	Ja'Kobi Gillespie	6 ft 0 in (1.83 m)	175 lb (79 kg)	Fr	Greeneville, Tennessee
G	3	Keishawn Davidson	6 ft 2 in (1.88 m)	175 lb (79 kg)	Sr	Murfreesboro, Tennessee
G	4	Kyler Vanderjagt	6 ft 4 in (1.93 m)	205 lb (93 kg)	Fr	Grand Rapids, Michigan
G	5	EJ Bellinger	6 ft 4 in (1.93 m)	205 lb (93 kg)	Sr	St. Peters, Missouri
F	10	Cade Tyson	6 ft 7 in (2.01 m)	200 lb (91 kg)	Fr	Monroe, North Carolina
F	11	Michael Shanks	6 ft 6 in (1.98 m)	210 lb (95 kg)	Jr	Bentonville, Arkansas
F	12	Drew Friberg	6 ft 7 in (2.01 m)	215 lb (98 kg)	GS	State College, Pennsylvania
G	20	Aidan Braccia	6 ft 2 in (1.88 m)	165 lb (75 kg)	Fr	Atherton, California
F	21	Derek Sabin	6 ft 9 in (2.06 m)	235 lb (107 kg)	Sr	Slinger, Wisconsin
G	22	Ben Sheppard	6 ft 6 in (1.98 m)	190 lb (86 kg)	Sr	Atlanta, Georgia
G	23	Jake Dykstra	6 ft 4 in (1.93 m)	180 lb (82 kg)	Fr	Nashville, Tennessee
G	24	Keith Robbins	6 ft 5 in (1.96 m)	175 lb (79 kg)	Fr	Milledgeville, Georgia
F	25	Frank Jakubicek	6 ft 8 in (2.03 m)	245 lb (111 kg)	Jr	Cary, Illinois

Head coach

- Casey Alexander (Belmont)

Assistant coach(es)

- Brian Ayers (Lipscomb)
- Sean Rutigliano (Cortland State)
- Tyler Holloway (Murray State)

Legend

- (C) Team captain
- (S) Suspended
- (I) Ineligible
- (W) Walk-on
- Injured
- Current redshirt

Roster
Last update: January 19, 2023

== Schedule and results ==
Date time, TV	Rank^{#}	Opponent^{#}	Result	Record	Site (attendance) city, state
Regular season
November 7, 2022*; 6:30 pm, ESPN+		Ohio	W 70–69	1–0	Curb Event Center (2,220); Nashville, TN
November 11, 2022*; 6:00 pm, ESPN+		at Furman	L 74–89	1–1	Timmons Arena (2,092); Greenville, SC
November 14, 2022*; 7:00 pm, ESPN+		at Lipscomb	L 75–77	1–2	Allen Arena (3,772); Nashville, TN
November 18, 2022*; 4:45 pm, ESPN3		vs. Tarleton State; Paradise Jam first round	L 81–89	1–3	Sports and Fitness Center; Saint Thomas, VI
November 19, 2022*; 4:45 p.m., ESPN3		vs. George Mason; Paradise Jam consolation 2nd round	W 66–62	2–3	Sports and Fitness Center (724); Saint Thomas, VI
November 21, 2022*; 2:15 p.m., ESPN3		vs. Howard; Paradise Jam 5th-place game	W 96–73	3–3	Sports and Fitness Center (724); Saint Thomas, VI
November 27, 2022*; 1:00 pm, ESPN+		at Georgia State	W 68–66	4–3	GSU Convocation Center (1,416); Atlanta, GA
December 1, 2022; 7:00 pm, ESPNU		Valparaiso	W 76–64	5–3 (1–0)	Curb Event Center (2,056); Nashville, TN
December 4, 2022; 1:00 pm, ESPN+		at Illinois State	L 77–87	5–4 (1–1)	CEFCU Arena (3,165); Normal, IL
December 6, 2022*; 6:30 pm, ESPN+		Trevecca Nazarene	W 83–53	6–4	Curb Event Center (1,307); Nashville, TN
December 10, 2022*; 4:00 pm, ESPN+		Middle Tennessee	L 75–85 ^{OT}	6–5	Curb Event Center (2,087); Nashville, TN
December 18, 2022*; 1:00 pm, ESPN+		at Chattanooga	W 83–79 ^{OT}	7–5	McKenzie Arena (3,466); Chattanooga, TN
December 21, 2022*; 4:00 pm, ESPN+		Samford	W 79–56	8–5	Curb Event Center (2,084); Nashville, TN
December 28, 2022; 7:00 pm, BSSO		Bradley	W 63–60	9–5 (2–1)	Curb Event Center (2,019); Nashville, TN
January 1, 2023; 4:00 pm, ESPNU		at Southern Illinois	L 45–63	9–6 (2–2)	Banterra Center (7,119); Carbondale, IL
January 4, 2023; 7:00 pm, ESPN+		at UIC	W 77–71	10–6 (3–2)	Credit Union 1 Arena (1,194); Chicago, IL
January 7, 2023; 7:00 pm, ESPN+		Missouri State	W 74–61	11–6 (4–2)	Curb Event Center; Nashville, TN
January 10, 2023; 6:00 pm, ESPN+		at Valparaiso	W 74–59	12–6 (5–2)	Athletics–Recreation Center (1,543); Valparaiso, IN
January 14, 2023; 4:00 pm, ESPN3		Northern Iowa	W 76–72	13–6 (6–2)	Curb Event Center (2,700); Nashville, TN
January 17, 2023; 8:00 pm, CBSSN		Murray State	W 80–65	14–6 (7–2)	Curb Event Center (2,507); Nashville, TN
January 21, 2023; 7:00 pm, ESPN+		at Bradley	W 78–76	15–6 (8–2)	Carver Arena (5,584); Peoria, IL
January 25, 2023; 7:00 pm, ESPN+		at Evansville	W 73–64	16–6 (9–2)	Ford Center (4,227); Evansville, IN
January 29, 2023; 2:00 pm, ESPN+		Drake	L 61–79	16–7 (9–3)	Curb Event Center (2,661); Nashville, TN
February 1, 2023; 7:00 pm, ESPN+		at Murray State	L 82–83	16–8 (9–4)	CFSB Center (5,271); Murray, KY
February 4, 2023; 4:00 pm, ESPN3		Illinois State	W 90–75	17–8 (10–4)	Curb Event Center (2,410); Nashville, TN
February 8, 2023; 6:00 pm, ESPN+		at Missouri State	L 59–61	17–9 (10–5)	Great Southern Bank Arena (4,102); Springfield, MO
February 11, 2023; 1:00 pm, ESPN3		UIC	W 98–71	18–9 (11–5)	Curb Event Center (2,341); Nashville, TN
February 15, 2023; 6:30 pm, ESPN+		Evansville	W 95–63	19–9 (12–5)	Curb Event Center (1,841); Nashville, TN
February 19, 2023; 2:00 pm, ESPN+		at Drake	L 56–70	19–10 (12–6)	Knapp Center (4,753); Des Moines, IA
February 22, 2023; 6:30 pm, ESPN+		Indiana State	W 89-88	20–10 (13–6)	Curb Event Center (2,364); Nashville, TN
February 26, 2023; 3:00 pm, ESPN+		at Northern Iowa	W 83–75	21–10 (14–6)	McLeod Center; Cedar Falls, IA
MVC Tournament
March 3, 2023; 2:30 pm, MVC TV	(4)	vs. (5) Indiana State; Quarterfinals	L 91–94	21–11	Enterprise Center; St. Louis, MO
*Non-conference game. ^{#}Rankings from AP Poll. (#) Tournament seedings in parentheses. All times are in Central.
