= 2022–23 Missouri State Bears basketball team =

American college basketball season

2022–23 Missouri State Bears basketball
- Conference: Missouri Valley Conference
- Record: 17–15 (12–8 MVC)
- Head coach: Dana Ford (5th season)
- Associate head coach: Jase Herl
- Assistant coaches: Sheldon Everett; Buzzy Caruthers
- Home arena: Great Southern Bank Arena

2022–23 Missouri Valley Conference men's basketball standings
	Conf.				Overall
Team	W		L	PCT	W		L	PCT
Bradley	16	–	4	.800	25	–	10	.714
Drake †	15	–	5	.750	27	–	8	.771
Southern Illinois	14	–	6	.700	23	–	10	.697
Belmont	14	–	6	.700	21	–	11	.656
Indiana State	13	–	7	.650	23	–	13	.639
Missouri State	12	–	8	.600	17	–	15	.531
Murray State	11	–	9	.550	17	–	15	.531
Northern Iowa	9	–	11	.450	14	–	18	.438
Illinois State	6	–	14	.300	11	–	21	.344
Valparaiso	5	–	15	.250	11	–	21	.344
UIC	4	–	16	.200	12	–	20	.375
Evansville	1	–	19	.050	5	–	27	.156
† 2023 MVC tournament winner

The 2022–23 Missouri State Bears basketball team represented Missouri State University during the 2022–23 NCAA Division I men's basketball season. The Bears, led by fifth-year head coach Dana Ford, played their home games at the Great Southern Bank Arena in Springfield, Missouri as members of the Missouri Valley Conference. They finished the season 16–14, 12–8 in MVC Play to finish in 6th place. They defeated UIC in the opening round of the MVC tournament before losing in the quarterfinals to Southern Illinois.

== Previous season ==
The Bears finished the 2021–22 season 23–11, 13–5 in MVC Play to finish in a three-way tie for 2nd place. They defeated Valparaiso in the quarterfinals of the MVC tournament before losing in the semifinals to Drake. They received an at-large bid to the National Invitation Tournament where they lost in the first round to Oklahoma.

== Roster ==
2022–23 Missouri State Bears men's basketball team
Players
Coaches

Pos.	#	Name	Height	Weight	Year	Previous school	Hometown
G	0	Chance Moore	6 ft 6 in (1.98 m)	205 lb (93 kg)	So	McEachern; Arkansas	Brookhaven, GA
G	1	Alston Mason	6 ft 2 in (1.88 m)	175 lb (79 kg)	So	Blue Valley Northwest; Oklahoma	Overland Park, KS
F	2	Jonathan Mogbo	6 ft 8 in (2.03 m)	225 lb (102 kg)	Jr	Forest Hill; Northeastern Oklahoma A&M	West Palm Beach, FL
G	3	Kendle Moore	6 ft 0 in (1.83 m)	155 lb (70 kg)	Sr	Danville; Colorado State	Danville, IL
G	4	Kanon Gipson	6 ft 3 in (1.91 m)	160 lb (73 kg)	Fr	We Are United Prep	Rogersville, MO
G	5	Donovan Clay	6 ft 8 in (2.03 m)	230 lb (104 kg)	Sr	Alton; Valparaiso	Alton, IL
G	10	Damien Mayo Jr	6 ft 3 in (1.91 m)	205 lb (93 kg)	Fr	Link Year Prep	St. Louis, MO
G	11	Raphe Ayres	6 ft 5 in (1.96 m)	205 lb (93 kg)	So	Vermont Academy	Arlington, VA
G	12	Bryan Trimble Jr	6 ft 3 in (1.91 m)	205 lb (93 kg)	Sr	Sunrise Christian Academy; Akron	Kansas City, MO
F	13	Jonathan Dunn	6 ft 7 in (2.01 m)	200 lb (91 kg)	Fr	We Are United Prep	Rogersville, MO
G	15	Matthew Lee	6 ft 0 in (1.83 m)	175 lb (79 kg)	Sr	Dohn Prep; Saint Peter's	San Juan, Puerto Rico
G	20	Tommy Pinegar	6 ft 2 in (1.88 m)	175 lb (79 kg)	Fr	Greenwood	Springfield, MO
G	21	James Graham	6 ft 7 in (2.01 m)	215 lb (98 kg)	Jr	Nicolet; Maryland	Milwaukee, WI
G	25	David Hill	6 ft 1 in (1.85 m)	185 lb (84 kg)	Fr	Neumann Regional Academy	Williamsport, PA
F	33	Dawson Carper	6 ft 11 in (2.11 m)	260 lb (118 kg)	Sr	Rampart; Hawaii	Colorado Springs, CO
F	34	Dalen Ridgnal	6 ft 7 in (2.01 m)	215 lb (98 kg)	Sr	Lincoln Academy; Georgia	Kansas City, MO
F	35	N.J. Benson	6 ft 8 in (2.03 m)	225 lb (102 kg)	Fr	Mt. Vernon Township	Mt. Vernon, IL

Head coach

- Dana Ford (Illinois State)

Assistant coach(es)

- Jase Herl (Colorado Mesa)
- Sheldon Everett (South Carolina)
- Buzzy Caruthers (Hampton)

Legend

- (C) Team captain
- (S) Suspended
- (I) Ineligible
- (W) Walk-on
- Injured
- Current redshirt

Roster
Last update: November 21, 2022

== Schedule and results ==
Date time, TV	Rank^{#}	Opponent^{#}	Result	Record	Site (attendance) city, state
Exhibition
November 5, 2022*; 7:00 p.m.		Newman	W 78–58	–	Great Southern Bank Arena (1,041); Springfield, MO
Regular season
November 9, 2022*; 7:00 p.m.		Missouri S&T	W 82–47	1–0	Great Southern Bank Arena (3,008); Springfield, MO
November 16, 2022*; 8:00 p.m., BYUtv		at BYU	L 64–66	1–1	Marriott Center (12,587); Provo, UT
November 19, 2022*; 2:00 p.m., ESPN3		Middle Tennessee	W 75–51	2–1	Great Southern Bank Arena (3,003); Springfield, MO
November 25, 2022*; 1:30 p.m., FloHoops		vs. UNC Wilmington; Nassau Championship first round	L 54–68	2–2	Baha Mar Convention Center (374); Nassau, Bahamas
November 26, 2022*; 11:00 a.m., FloHoops		vs. Ball State; Nassau Championship consolation 2nd round	L 64–67	2–3	Baha Mar Convention Center (368); Nassau, Bahamas
November 27, 2022*; 11:00 a.m., FloHoops		vs. Oakland; Nassau Championship 7th place game	W 76–64	3–3	Baha Mar Convention Center (260); Nassau, Bahamas
November 30, 2022; 7:00 p.m., ESPN+		at UIC	W 66–51	4–3 (1–0)	Credit Union 1 Arena (1,174); Chicago, IL
December 3, 2022; 7:00 p.m., ESPN+		Bradley	L 40–58	4–4 (1–1)	Great Southern Bank Arena (3,582); Springfield, MO
December 7, 2022*; 9:00 p.m., WCCSports		at Saint Mary's	L 46–66	4–5	University Credit Union Pavilion (2,863); Moraga, CA
December 10, 2022*; 7:00 p.m., ESPN+		Purdue Fort Wayne	L 61–65	4–6	Great Southern Bank Arena (3,887); Springfield, MO
December 16, 2022*; 7:00 p.m., ORU Sports Net		at Oral Roberts	L 77–80	4–7	Mabee Center (4,692); Tulsa, OK
December 18, 2022*; 5:00 p.m., ESPN+		Central Michigan	W 79–58	5–7	Great Southern Bank Arena (2,020); Springfield, MO
December 28, 2022; 7:00 p.m., ESPN+		at Northern Iowa	W 79–67	6–7 (2–1)	McLeod Center (4,123); Cedar Falls, IA
January 1, 2023; 2:00 p.m., MVC Wildcard		Drake	W 52–49	7–7 (3–1)	Great Southern Bank Arena (2,836); Springfield, MO
January 4, 2023; 7:00 p.m., ESPN+		Evansville	W 85–62	8–7 (4–1)	Great Southern Bank Arena (2,567); Springfield, MO
January 7, 2023; 4:00 p.m., MVC Wildcard		at Belmont	L 61–74	8–8 (4–2)	Curb Event Center; Nashville, TN
January 11, 2023; 7:00 p.m., ESPN+		at Illinois State	L 66–76 ^{OT}	8–9 (4–3)	CEFCU Arena (3,112); Normal, IL
January 15, 2023; 2:00 p.m., ESPN+		Indiana State	W 64–62	9–9 (5–3)	Great Southern Bank Arena (3,210); Springfield, MO
January 18, 2023; 7:00 p.m., MVC Network		at Drake	W 65–62 ^{OT}	10–9 (6–3)	Knapp Center (2,518); Des Moines, IA
January 21, 2023; 3:00 p.m., MVC Wildcard		Southern Illinois	L 57–61	10–10 (6–4)	Great Southern Bank Arena (3,782); Springfield, MO
January 24, 2023; 7:00 p.m., ESPN+		UIC	W 63–59	11–10 (7–4)	Great Southern Bank Arena (3,026); Springfield, MO
January 28, 2023; 1:00 p.m., MVC Network		at Murray State	L 71–74	11–11 (7–5)	CFSB Center (6,712); Murray, KY
February 1, 2023; 7:00 p.m., ESPN+		Valparaiso	W 76–67 ^{OT}	12–11 (8–5)	Great Southern Bank Arena (3,489); Springfield, MO
February 5, 2023; 1:00 p.m., MVC Network		at Southern Illinois	L 53–73	12–12 (8–6)	Banterra Center (5,802); Carbondale, IL
February 8, 2023; 6:00 p.m., MVC Network		Belmont	W 61–59	13–12 (9–6)	Great Southern Bank Arena (4,102); Springfield, MO
February 12, 2023; 1:00 p.m., ESPN+		at Evansville	W 66–60	14–12 (10–6)	Ford Center (4,412); Evansville, IN
February 15, 2023; 7:00 p.m., ESPN+		at Bradley	L 54–64	14–13 (10–7)	Carver Arena (4,791); Peoria, IL
February 18, 2023; 3:00 p.m., ESPN3		Northern Iowa	L 66–69	14–14 (10–8)	Great Southern Bank Arena (4,002); Springfield, MO
February 21, 2023; 6:00 p.m., CBSSN		Murray State	W 84–69	15–14 (11–8)	Great Southern Bank Arena (3,684); Springfield, MO
February 26, 2023; 1:00 p.m., MVC Wildcard		at Indiana State	W 66–62	16–14 (12–8)	Hulman Center (4,993); Terre Haute, IN
MVC tournament
March 2, 2023; 8:30 pm, MVC TV	(6)	vs. (11) UIC; Opening round	W 74–57	17–14	Enterprise Center (3,564); St. Louis, MO
March 3, 2023; 8:30 pm, MVC TV	(6)	vs. (3) Southern Illinois; Quarterfinals	L 51–54	17–15	Enterprise Center; St. Louis, MO
*Non-conference game. ^{#}Rankings from AP Poll. (#) Tournament seedings in parentheses. All times are in Central Time.
