= 2024–25 Bradley Braves men's basketball team =

American college basketball season

2024–25 Bradley Braves men's basketball

Myrtle Beach Invitational champions

NIT, Quarterfinals
- Conference: Missouri Valley Conference
- Record: 28–9 (15–5 MVC)
- Head coach: Brian Wardle (10th season)
- Associate head coach: Mike Bargen
- Assistant coaches: Jimmie Foster; Mike Black
- Home arena: Carver Arena

2024–25 Missouri Valley Conference men's basketball standings
	Conf.				Overall
Team	W		L	PCT	W		L	PCT
Drake †	17	–	3	.850	31	–	4	.886
Bradley	15	–	5	.750	28	–	9	.757
Northern Iowa	14	–	6	.700	20	–	13	.606
Belmont	13	–	7	.650	22	–	11	.667
Illinois State	10	–	10	.500	22	–	14	.611
UIC	10	–	10	.500	17	–	14	.548
Murray State	9	–	11	.450	16	–	17	.485
Southern Illinois	8	–	12	.400	14	–	19	.424
Indiana State	8	–	12	.400	14	–	18	.438
Evansville	8	–	12	.400	11	–	21	.344
Valparaiso	6	–	14	.300	15	–	19	.441
Missouri State	2	–	18	.100	9	–	23	.281
† 2025 MVC tournament winner

The 2024–25 Bradley Braves men's basketball team represented Bradley University during the 2024–25 NCAA Division I men's basketball season. The Braves, led by 10th-year head coach Brian Wardle, played their home games at Carver Arena located in Peoria, Illinois, as members of the Missouri Valley Conference. They finished the season 28–9, 15–5 in MVC play to finish in second place. They defeated Murray State and Valparaiso in the MVC tournament before losing to Drake in the championship game. They received an at-large bid to the National Invitation Tournament as the No. 3 seed in the Dayton region. There they defeated North Alabama and George Mason before losing to Chattanooga in the quarterfinals.

== Previous season ==
The Braves finished the 2023–24 season 23–12, 13–7 in MVC play to finish in third place. They defeated UIC in the quarterfinals of the MVC tournament, before losing to Drake. They received a bid to the National Invitation Tournament as a No. 3 seed. They defeated Loyola Chicago, before losing to Cincinnati in the second round.

== Roster ==
2024–25 Bradley Braves men's basketball team
Players
Coaches

Pos.	#	Name	Height	Weight	Year	Previous school	Hometown
G	0	Demarion Burch	6 ft 4 in (1.93 m)	200 lb (91 kg)	So	Milwaukee-Hamilton HS	Milwaukee, Wisconsin
F	1	Almar Atlason	6 ft 8 in (2.03 m)	230 lb (104 kg)	So	KR Reykjavík	Reykjavík, Iceland
G	2	Connor Dillon	6 ft 2 in (1.88 m)	190 lb (86 kg)	Sr	Winona State	Peoria, Illinois
G	3	Zek Montgomery	6 ft 6 in (1.98 m)	210 lb (95 kg)	Sr	Rhode Island	Louisville, Kentucky
F	4	Corey Thomas	6 ft 10 in (2.08 m)	210 lb (95 kg)	Jr	Cowley CC	Buford, Georgia
G/F	5	Christian Davis	6 ft 7 in (2.01 m)	205 lb (93 kg)	RS Sr	Le Moyne	Denver, Colorado
G/F	10	Timoty van der Knaap	6 ft 8 in (2.03 m)	195 lb (88 kg)	Fr	Orange1 Bassano	Bassano del Grappa, Italy
G	12	Cade Hardtke (W)	6 ft 2 in (1.88 m)	190 lb (86 kg)	Sr	Glenbard South HS	Lombard, Illinois
G	13	Sam Hennessy (W)	6 ft 2 in (1.88 m)	180 lb (82 kg)	Sr	Benet Academy	Naperville, Illinois
C	14	Ahmet Jonovic	7 ft 1 in (2.16 m)	250 lb (113 kg)	Jr	OKK Beograd	Prijepolje, Serbia
G	21	Duke Deen (5Y)	5 ft 8 in (1.73 m)	170 lb (77 kg)	Sr	Troy	Shreveport, Louisiana
G	22	Jaquan Johnson	5 ft 10 in (1.78 m)	195 lb (88 kg)	Fr	Pius XI HS	Milwaukee, Wisconsin
G	23	Gus Rugaard	6 ft 1 in (1.85 m)	180 lb (82 kg)	Fr	Morton HS	Morton, Illinois
F	25	Goanar Biliew (5Y)	6 ft 8 in (2.03 m)	240 lb (109 kg)	Sr	Des Moines Area CC	Denison, Iowa
F	34	Connor Linke (5Y)	6 ft 9 in (2.06 m)	240 lb (109 kg)	Sr	St. Charles North HS	St. Charles, Illinois
F	35	Darius Hannah (5Y)	6 ft 9 in (2.06 m)	205 lb (93 kg)	Sr	Milwaukee Academy of Science	Milwaukee, Wisconsin

Head coach

- Brian Wardle (Marquette)

Assistant coach(es)

- Mike Bargen (Marquette)
- Jimmie Foster (South Dakota)
- Mike Black (Albany)

Legend

- (C) Team captain
- (S) Suspended
- (I) Ineligible
- (W) Walk-on
- (5Y) Fifth-year senior
- Injured
- Current redshirt

Roster
Last update: November 22, 2024

== Schedule and results ==
Date time, TV	Rank^{#}	Opponent^{#}	Result	Record	Site (attendance) city, state
Exhibition
October 30, 2024*; 7:00 pm		Millikin	W 80–63		Carver Arena (4,448); Peoria, IL
Regular season
November 4, 2024*; 7:00 pm, ESPN+		Southeast Missouri State	W 88–60	1–0	Carver Arena (5,014); Peoria, IL
November 8, 2024*; 10:00 pm, ESPN+		at Washington State	L 74–91	1–1	Beasley Coliseum (3,982); Pullman, WA
November 12, 2024*; 7:00 pm, ESPN+		UTSA	W 85–72	2–1	Carver Arena (4,557); Peoria, IL
November 16, 2024*; 7:00 pm, ESPN+		Northern Illinois	W 76–60	3–1	Carver Arena (6,094); Peoria, IL
November 21, 2024*; 4:30 pm, ESPNU		vs. Texas State; Myrtle Beach Invitational Quarterfinal	W 82–68	4–1	HTC Center (660); Conway, SC
November 22, 2024*; 4:00 pm, ESPNU		vs. Wright State; Myrtle Beach Invitational Semifinal	W 77–74	5–1	HTC Center (674); Conway, SC
November 24, 2024*; 4:30 p.m., ESPN		vs. Middle Tennessee; Myrtle Beach Invitational Final	W 80–69	6–1	HTC Center (712); Conway, SC
November 29, 2024*; 1:00 pm, ESPN+		Judson	W 107–41	7–1	Carver Arena (5,064); Peoria, IL
December 3, 2024; 7:00 pm, ESPN+		at Southern Illinois	W 83–60	8–1 (1–0)	Banterra Center (4,332); Carbondale, IL
December 13, 2024*; 3:30 pm, BallerTV		vs. Santa Clara; Jack Jones Classic	L 74–84	8–2	Lee's Family Forum; Henderson, NV
December 18, 2024*; 7:00 pm, ESPN+		San Francisco	W 66–64	9–2	Carver Arena (4,918); Peoria, IL
December 21, 2024*; 1:00 pm, ESPN+		Canisius	W 92–59	10–2	Carver Arena (5,002); Peoria, IL
December 29, 2024; 3:00 pm, ESPN+		Valparaiso	W 81–75 ^{2OT}	11–2 (2–0)	Carver Arena (6,201); Peoria, IL
January 1, 2025; 6:00 pm, Gray Media/ESPN+		at Indiana State	W 90–89 ^{OT}	12–2 (3–0)	Hulman Center (5,083); Terre Haute, IN
January 4, 2025; 7:00 pm, CBSSN		Missouri State	W 69–60	13–2 (4–0)	Carver Arena (5,816); Peoria, IL
January 8, 2025; 6:00 pm, CBSSN		Drake	L 57–64	13–3 (4–1)	Carver Arena (6,188); Peoria, IL
January 11, 2025; 2:00 pm, ESPN+		at UIC	W 61–60	14–3 (5–1)	Credit Union 1 Arena (1,896); Chicago, IL
January 15, 2025; 7:00 pm, ESPN+		Indiana State	W 118–65	15–3 (6–1)	Carver Arena (5,330); Peoria, IL
January 18, 2025; 3:00 pm, ESPN+		at Murray State	W 74–61	16–3 (7–1)	CFSB Center (5,594); Murray, KY
January 21, 2025; 6:30 pm, ESPN+		at Belmont	W 89–77	17–3 (8–1)	Curb Event Center (1,788); Nashville, TN
January 25, 2025; 1:00 pm, CBSSN		Illinois State; I-74 Rivalry	W 61–57	18–3 (9–1)	Carver Arena (9,656); Peoria, IL
January 29, 2025; 7:00 pm, ESPN+		UIC	L 70–93	18–4 (9–2)	Carver Arena (5,785); Peoria, IL
February 2, 2025; 3:00 pm, ESPN2		at Northern Iowa	L 69–83	18–5 (9–3)	McLeod Center (4,121); Cedar Falls, IA
February 5, 2025; 8:00 pm, Gray Media/ESPN+		Belmont	L 77–80	18–6 (9–4)	Carver Arena (4,869); Peoria, IL
February 8, 2025; 7:00 pm, CBSSN		at Evansville	W 80–74	19–6 (10–4)	Ford Center (5,810); Evansville, IN
February 12, 2025; 6:00 pm, Gray Media/ESPN+		Southern Illinois	W 78–64	20–6 (11–4)	Carver Arena (5,183); Peoria, IL
February 16, 2025; 1:00 pm, ESPN2		at Drake	W 61–59	21–6 (12–4)	The Knapp Center (6,424); Des Moines, IA
February 19, 2025; 7:00 pm, CBSSN		at Illinois State; I-74 Rivalry	L 71–82	21–7 (12–5)	CEFCU Arena (5,719); Normal, IL
February 22, 2025; 5:00 pm, ESPNU		Murray State	W 85–83 ^{OT}	22–7 (13–5)	Carver Arena (7,560); Peoria, IL
February 26, 2025; 8:00 pm, Gray Media/ESPN+		at Valparaiso	W 76–65	23–7 (14–5)	Athletics–Recreation Center (1,583); Valparaiso, IN
March 2, 2025; 1:00 pm, ESPN2		Northern Iowa	W 73–56	24–7 (15–5)	Carver Arena (7,537); Peoria, IL
MVC tournament
March 7, 2025; 6:00 pm, Gray Media/ESPN+	(2)	vs. (7) Murray State; Arch Madness Quarterfinal	W 70–62	25–7	Enterprise Center (6,090); St. Louis, MO
March 8, 2025; 5:00 pm, CBSSN	(2)	vs. (11) Valparaiso; Arch Madness Semifinal	W 70–65	26–7	Enterprise Center (7,779); St. Louis, MO
March 9, 2025; 1:15 pm, CBS	(2)	vs. (1) Drake; Arch Madness Final	L 48–63	26–8	Enterprise Center (7,952); St. Louis, MO
NIT
March 19, 2025*; 7:00 pm, ESPN+	(3)	North Alabama; First round – Dayton Region	W 71–64	27–8	Carver Arena (2,950); Peoria, IL
March 22, 2025*; 2:00 pm, ESPN+	(3)	at (2) George Mason; Second round – Dayton Region	W 75–67	28–8	EagleBank Arena (2,180); Fairfax, VA
March 25, 2025*; 6:00 pm, ESPN2	(3)	Chattanooga; Quarterfinals – Dayton Region	L 65–67	28–9	Carver Arena (4,954); Peoria, IL
*Non-conference game. ^{#}Rankings from AP Poll. (#) Tournament seedings in parentheses. All times are in Central.
