= 2023–24 Belmont Bruins men's basketball team =

American college basketball season

2023–24 Belmont Bruins men's basketball
- Conference: Missouri Valley Conference
- Record: 20–13 (12–8 MVC)
- Head coach: Casey Alexander (5th season)
- Associate head coach: Brian Ayers
- Assistant coaches: Sean Rutigliano; Tyler Holloway
- Home arena: Curb Event Center

2023–24 Missouri Valley Conference men's basketball standings
	Conf.				Overall
Team	W		L	PCT	W		L	PCT
Indiana State	17	–	3	.850	32	–	7	.821
Drake †	16	–	4	.800	28	–	7	.800
Bradley	13	–	7	.650	23	–	12	.657
Northern Iowa	12	–	8	.600	19	–	14	.576
Belmont	12	–	8	.600	20	–	13	.606
Southern Illinois	11	–	9	.550	19	–	13	.594
Illinois State	9	–	11	.450	15	–	17	.469
Murray State	9	–	11	.450	12	–	20	.375
Missouri State	8	–	12	.400	17	–	16	.515
Evansville	6	–	14	.300	17	–	18	.486
UIC	4	–	16	.200	12	–	21	.364
Valparaiso	3	–	17	.150	7	–	25	.219
† 2024 MVC tournament winner

The 2023–24 Belmont Bruins men's basketball team represented Belmont University during the 2023–24 NCAA Division I men's basketball season. The Bruins, led by fifth-year head coach Casey Alexander, played their home games at the Curb Event Center in Nashville, Tennessee as members of the Missouri Valley Conference.

== Previous season ==
The Bruins finished the 2022–23 season 21–11, 14–6 in MVC play, to finish in a tie for third place. In the first round of the MVC tournament, they lost to Indiana State.

== Roster ==
2023–24 Belmont Bruins men's basketball team
Players
Coaches

Pos.	#	Name	Height	Weight	Year	Hometown
G	0	Ja'Kobi Gillespie	6 ft 1 in (1.85 m)	180 lb (82 kg)	So	Greeneville, TN
G	1	Isaiah Walker	6 ft 5 in (1.96 m)	200 lb (91 kg)	So	Wyoming, OH
G	2	Win Miller	6 ft 3 in (1.91 m)	185 lb (84 kg)	Fr	Vestavia Hills, AL
G	3	Keishawn Davidson	6 ft 2 in (1.88 m)	170 lb (77 kg)	Sr	Murfreesboro, TN
F	4	Malik Dia	6 ft 9 in (2.06 m)	240 lb (109 kg)	So	Murfreesboro, TN
G	5	Jayce Willingham	6 ft 5 in (1.96 m)	225 lb (102 kg)	GS	Jasper, AL
G/F	10	Cade Tyson	6 ft 7 in (2.01 m)	205 lb (93 kg)	So	Monroe, NC
G/F	11	Drew Scharnowski	6 ft 9 in (2.06 m)	215 lb (98 kg)	Fr	Burlington, IL
F	14	Sam Orme	6 ft 8 in (2.03 m)	215 lb (98 kg)	Fr	Carmel, IN
G	20	Aidan Braccia	6 ft 1 in (1.85 m)	170 lb (77 kg)	So	Atherton, CA
F	21	Brigham Rogers	6 ft 9 in (2.06 m)	240 lb (109 kg)	Fr	Woodstock, GA
G	22	Kyler Vanderjagt	6 ft 4 in (1.93 m)	205 lb (93 kg)	So	Grand Rapids, MI
G	23	Jake Dykstra	6 ft 4 in (1.93 m)	195 lb (88 kg)	So	Nashville, TN
G	24	Keith Robbins	6 ft 5 in (1.96 m)	180 lb (82 kg)	Fr	Milledgeville, GA

Head coach

- Casey Alexander (Belmont)

Assistant coach(es)

- Brian Ayers (Lipscomb)
- Sean Rutigliano (Cortland State)
- Tyler Holloway (Murray State)

Legend

- (C) Team captain
- (S) Suspended
- (I) Ineligible
- (W) Walk-on
- Injured
- Current redshirt

Roster
Last update: October 29, 2023

== Schedule and results ==
Date time, TV	Rank^{#}	Opponent^{#}	Result	Record	Site (attendance) city, state
Regular season
November 6, 2023*; 6:30 pm, ESPN+		Georgia State	W 89–87	1–0	Curb Event Center (2,204); Nashville, TN
November 10, 2023*; 6:00 pm, ESPN+		at Furman	L 76–99	1–1	Timmons Arena (2,017); Greenville, SC
November 14, 2023*; 6:30 pm, ESPN+		Berry	W 93–59	2–1	Curb Event Center (1,537); Nashville, TN
November 17, 2023*; 10:00 pm, P12N		at No. 3 Arizona	L 68–100	2–2	McKale Center (14,688); Tucson, AZ
November 24, 2023*; 1:00 pm, ESPN+		vs. Monmouth; Cathedral of College Basketball Classic	L 84–93	2–3	The Palestra (1,883); Philadelphia, PA
November 25, 2023*; 3:30 pm, ESPN+		at Penn; Cathedral of College Basketball Classic	W 84–79 ^{OT}	3–3	The Palestra (1,534); Philadelphia, PA
November 26, 2023*; 11:00 am, ESPN+		vs. Lafayette; Cathedral of College Basketball Classic	W 79–69	4–3	The Palestra (840); Philadelphia, PA
November 29, 2023; 7:30 pm, Bally Sports		at Northern Iowa	W 90–70	5–3 (1–0)	McLeod Center (3,243); Cedar Falls, IA
December 2, 2023; 1:00 pm, ESPN+		Valparaiso	W 77–68	6–3 (2–0)	Curb Event Center (1,532); Nashville, TN
December 6, 2023*; 7:00 pm, ESPN+		Lipscomb; Battle of the Boulevard	W 72–71	7–3	Curb Event Center (4,301); Nashville, TN
December 9, 2023*; 7:30 pm, CBSSN		at Middle Tennessee	W 75–65	8–3	Murphy Center (2,605); Murfreesboro, TN
December 16, 2023*; 2:00 pm, ESPN+		at Samford	L 93–99	8–4	Pete Hanna Center (2,196); Homewood, AL
December 20, 2023*; 6:30 pm, ESPN+		Arkansas State	W 74–70	9–4	Curb Event Center (2,052); Nashville, TN
January 2, 2024; 7:00 pm, ESPN+		at Southern Illinois	L 63–73	9–5 (2–1)	Banterra Center (4,324); Carbondale, IL
January 7, 2024; 2:00 pm, ESPN+		Drake	W 87–65	10–5 (3–1)	Curb Event Center (2,186); Nashville, TN
January 10, 2024; 6:30 pm, ESPN+		Illinois State	W 67–60	11–5 (4–1)	Curb Event Center (1,660); Nashville, TN
January 13, 2024; 1:00 pm, ESPN+		at Indiana State	L 64–94	11–6 (4–2)	Hulman Center (5,963); Terre Haute, IN
January 17, 2024; 8:00 pm, CBSSN		Northern Iowa	L 72–83	11–7 (4–3)	Curb Event Center (1,141); Nashville, TN
January 20, 2024; 1:00 pm, ESPN+		at Bradley	L 72–95	11–8 (4–4)	Carver Arena (6,521); Peoria, IL
January 23, 2024; 7:00 pm, ESPN+		at Illinois State	L 67–77	11–9 (4–5)	CEFCU Arena (2,860); Normal, IL
January 27, 2024; 4:00 pm, ESPN+		UIC	W 74–65	12–9 (5–5)	Curb Event Center (2,429); Nashville, TN
January 31, 2024; 6:30 pm, ESPN+		Indiana State	L 72–78	12–10 (5–6)	Curb Event Center (2,263); Nashville, TN
February 3, 2024; 5:00 pm, ESPN+		at Missouri State	L 80–87	12–11 (5–7)	Great Southern Bank Arena (3,412); Springfield, MO
February 7, 2024; 7:00 pm, Bally Sports		Murray State	W 69–64	13–11 (6–7)	Curb Event Center (1,652); Nashville, TN
February 10, 2024; 3:00 pm, ESPN+		at Valparaiso	W 96–78	14–11 (7–7)	Athletics–Recreation Center (1,499); Valparaiso, IN
February 14, 2024; 6:30 pm, ESPN+		Southern Illinois	W 82–68	15–11 (8–7)	Curb Event Center (1,231); Nashville, TN
February 18, 2024; 3:00 pm, ESPN+		at UIC	W 75–60	16–11 (9–7)	Credit Union 1 Arena (1,815); Chicago, IL
February 21, 2024; 7:00 pm, Bally Sports		at Drake	L 69–84	16–12 (9–8)	Knapp Center (3,612); Des Moines, IA
February 24, 2024; 5:00 pm, ESPN+		Missouri State	W 93–78	17–12 (10–8)	Curb Event Center (3,261); Nashville, TN
February 28, 2024; 7:00 pm, ESPN+		at Murray State	W 83–61	18–12 (11–8)	CFSB Center (5,039); Murray, KY
March 3, 2024; 4:00 pm, ESPN+		Evansville	W 83–66	19–12 (12–8)	Curb Event Center (2,437); Nashville, TN
MVC tournament
March 7, 2024; 2:30 pm, MVC TV	(5)	vs. (12) Valparaiso; Opening round	W 86–61	20–12	Enterprise Center (3,314); St. Louis, MO
March 8, 2024; 2:30 pm, MVC TV	(5)	vs. (4) Northern Iowa; Quarterfinals	L 62–67	20–13	Enterprise Center (5,403); St. Louis, MO
*Non-conference game. ^{#}Rankings from AP poll. (#) Tournament seedings in parentheses. All times are in Central.
