= Myrtle Beach Invitational =

Preseason college basketball tournament

- Myrtle Beach Invitational
- Formerly: Puerto Rico Tip-Off
- Sport: College basketball
- Founded: 2018
- Founder: ESPN Regional Television
- Folded: 2024
- No. of teams: 8
- Country: United States
- Venues: HTC Center; Conway, South Carolina
- Last champion: Bradley
- Broadcaster: ESPN
- Website: espnevents.com/myrtle-beach-invitational/

The Myrtle Beach Invitational was an in-season college basketball tournament owned and operated by ESPN Regional Television that took place in late November of each year, usually the week before Thanksgiving.

The tournament had its inaugural run in 2018. After six years ESPN announced the tournament would cease operations after November of 2024.

== Tournament history ==
=== Champions ===
| Year | School | Score | Runner-up | Tournament MVP |
|---|---|---|---|---|
| 2018 | UCF | 78–62 | Western Kentucky | Aubrey Dawkins, UCF |
| 2019 | Baylor | 87–78 | Villanova | Jared Butler, Baylor |
| 2021 | Utah State | 73–70 | Oklahoma | Justin Bean, Utah State |
| 2022 | Massachusetts | 60–54 | Charlotte | Noah Fernandes, UMass |
| 2023 | Liberty | 71–61 | Vermont | Kyle Rode, Liberty |
| 2024 | Bradley | 80–69 | Middle Tennessee | Christian Davis, Bradley |

== Brackets ==
* – Denotes overtime period

=== 2024 ===
The 2024 tournament took place at the HTC Center in Conway, South Carolina from November 21–24, 2024.

5th Place Game; Sunday, November 24
Ohio | 65
Texas State | 74
7th Place Game
Portland | 67
Princeton | 94

Consolation 2nd Round; Friday, November 22
Ohio | 85
Portland | 73
Texas State | 83
Princeton | 80

First Round; Thursday, November 21
Ohio | 81
Middle Tennessee | 83*
South Florida | 74
Portland | 68
Bradley | 82
Texas State | 68
Princeton | 62
Wright State | 80

Semifinals; Friday, November 22
Middle Tennessee | 95
South Florida | 88
Bradley | 77
Wright State | 74

Championship; Sunday, November 24
Middle Tennessee | 69
Bradley | 80
3rd Place Game
South Florida | 73
Wright State | 72

=== 2023 ===
The 2023 tournament took place at the HTC Center in Conway, South Carolina from November 16–19, 2023.

Game recaps:

5th Place Game; Sunday, November 19
Wyoming | 78
Furman | 71
7th Place Game
Charleston | 80
Coastal Carolina | 72

Consolation 2nd Round; Friday, November 17
Charleston | 60
Wyoming | 67
Coastal Carolina | 80
Furman | 89

First Round; Thursday, November 16
Charleston | 64
Vermont | 73
Saint Louis | 79
Wyoming | 69
Wichita State | 86
Coastal Carolina | 77
Furman | 74
Liberty | 88

Semifinals; Friday, November 17
Vermont | 78
Saint Louis | 68
Wichita State | 66
Liberty | 83

Championship; Sunday, November 19
Vermont | 61
Liberty | 71
3rd Place Game
Saint Louis | 69
Wichita State | 90

=== 2022 ===
The 2022 tournament took place at HTC Center in Conway, South Carolina from November 17–20, 2022.

Game recaps:

5th Place Game; Sunday, November 20
Colorado | 55
Boise State | 68
7th Place Game
#24 Texas A&M | 67
Loyola-Chicago | 51

Consolation 2nd Round; Friday, November 18
Colorado | 103
#24 Texas A&M | 75
Boise State | 70
Loyola-Chicago | 48

First Round; Thursday, November 17
Colorado | 63
Massachusetts | 66
Murray State | 88
#24 Texas A&M | 79
Boise State | 42
Charlotte | 54
Loyola-Chicago | 66
Tulsa | 85

Semifinals; Friday, November 18
Massachusetts | 71
Murray State | 69
Charlotte | 68
Tulsa | 65

Championship; Sunday, November 20
Massachusetts | 60
Charlotte | 54
3rd Place Game
Murray State | 77
Tulsa | 60

=== 2021 ===
5th Place Game; Sunday, November 21
Davidson | 76
East Carolina | 67
7th Place Game
Penn | 71
Old Dominion | 63

Consolation 2nd Round; Friday, November 19
Davidson | 72
Penn | 60
East Carolina | 73
Old Dominion | 60

First Round; Thursday, November 18
Davidson | 64
New Mexico State | 75
Penn | 79
Utah State | 87**
Oklahoma | 79
East Carolina | 74
Indiana State | 77
Old Dominion | 36

Semifinals; Friday, November 19
New Mexico State | 58
Utah State | 85
Oklahoma | 87
Indiana State | 63

Championship; Sunday, November 21
Utah State | 73
Oklahoma | 70
3rd Place Game
New Mexico State | 80
Indiana State | 66

=== 2019 ===
5th Place Game; November 24
Tulane | 65
Utah | 61
7th Place Game
Middle Tennessee | 63
Ohio | 75

Consolation 2nd Round; November 24
Middle Tennessee | 74
Tulane | 86
Ohio | 66
Utah | 80

First Round; November 21
17 | Villanova | 98
Middle Tennessee | 69
Mississippi State | 80
Tulane | 66
Ohio | 53
24 | Baylor | 76
Utah | 57
Coastal Carolina | 79

Semifinals; November 22
17 | Villanova | 83
Mississippi State | 76
24 | Baylor | 77
Coastal Carolina | 65

Championship; November 24
17 | Villanova | 78
24 | Baylor | 87
3rd Place Game
Mississippi State | 81
Coastal Carolina | 56

=== 2018 ===
5th Place Game; November 18
Wake Forest | 69
Valparaiso | 63
7th Place Game
Cal State Fullerton | 87
Monmouth | 63

Consolation 2nd Round; November 16
Wake Forest | 66
Cal State Fullerton | 59
Valparaiso | 64
Monmouth | 53

First Round; November 15
Saint Joseph's | 89
Wake Forest | 69
UCF | 68
Cal State Fullerton | 52
Valparaiso | 71
Western Kentucky | 83
Monmouth | 53
West Virginia | 71

Semifinals; November 16
Saint Joseph's | 57
UCF | 77
Western Kentucky | 63
West Virginia | 57

Championship; November 18
UCF | 78
Western Kentucky | 62
3rd Place Game
Saint Joseph's | 90
West Virginia | 97
