= 2023–24 Missouri State Bears basketball team =

American college basketball season

2023–24 Missouri State Bears basketball

Paradise Jam Tournament champions
- Conference: Missouri Valley Conference
- Record: 17–16 (8–12 MVC)
- Head coach: Dana Ford (6th season)
- Assistant coaches: Sheldon Everett; Buzzy Caruthers; Jay Spoonhour
- Home arena: Great Southern Bank Arena

2023–24 Missouri Valley Conference men's basketball standings
	Conf.				Overall
Team	W		L	PCT	W		L	PCT
Indiana State	17	–	3	.850	32	–	7	.821
Drake †	16	–	4	.800	28	–	7	.800
Bradley	13	–	7	.650	23	–	12	.657
Northern Iowa	12	–	8	.600	19	–	14	.576
Belmont	12	–	8	.600	20	–	13	.606
Southern Illinois	11	–	9	.550	19	–	13	.594
Illinois State	9	–	11	.450	15	–	17	.469
Murray State	9	–	11	.450	12	–	20	.375
Missouri State	8	–	12	.400	17	–	16	.515
Evansville	6	–	14	.300	17	–	18	.486
UIC	4	–	16	.200	12	–	21	.364
Valparaiso	3	–	17	.150	7	–	25	.219
† 2024 MVC tournament winner

The 2023–24 Missouri State Bears basketball team represented Missouri State University during the 2023–24 NCAA Division I men's basketball season. The Bears, led by sixth-year head coach Dana Ford, played their home games at the Great Southern Bank Arena located in Springfield, Missouri as members of the Missouri Valley Conference.

== Previous season ==
The Bears finished the 2022–23 season 17–15, 12–8 in MVC play to finish in sixth place. They defeated UIC in the opening round of the MVC tournament, before losing in the quarterfinals to Southern Illinois.

== Roster ==
2023–24 Missouri State Bears men's basketball team
Players
Coaches

Pos.	#	Name	Height	Weight	Year	Previous school	Hometown
G	0	Chance Moore	6 ft 6 in (1.98 m)	205 lb (93 kg)	Jr	Arkansas	Brookhaven, Georgia
G	1	Alston Mason	6 ft 2 in (1.88 m)	175 lb (79 kg)	Jr	Oklahoma	Overland Park, Kansas
G	2	Davion Hill	6 ft 2 in (1.88 m)	215 lb (98 kg)	Fr	Neumann Regional Academy	Williamsport, Pennsylvania
G	3	Tyler Bey	6 ft 8 in (2.03 m)	185 lb (84 kg)	Fr	Overtime Elite	Newark, New Jersey
F	4	Cesare Edwards	6 ft 9 in (2.06 m)	225 lb (102 kg)	Jr	Xavier	Hartsville, South Carolina
G/F	5	Donovan Clay	6 ft 8 in (2.03 m)	230 lb (104 kg)	Sr	Valparaiso	Alton, Illinois
G	10	Damien Mayo Jr.	6 ft 3 in (1.91 m)	205 lb (93 kg)	So	Link Year Prep	St. Louis, Missouri
G	11	Raphe Ayres	6 ft 5 in (1.96 m)	205 lb (93 kg)	Jr	Vermont Academy	Arlington, Virginia
G	15	Matthew Lee	6 ft 0 in (1.83 m)	175 lb (79 kg)	Sr	Saint Peter's	San Juan, Puerto Rico
G	20	Tommy Pinegar	6 ft 2 in (1.88 m)	175 lb (79 kg)	RS Fr	Greenwood Laboratory School	Springfield, Missouri
G	21	Nick Kramer	6 ft 3 in (1.91 m)	200 lb (91 kg)	RS Fr	Saint Louis	St. Louis, Missouri
G	23	Kanon Gipson	6 ft 3 in (1.91 m)	160 lb (73 kg)	RS Fr	We Are United Prep	Rogersville, Missouri
F	33	Dawson Carper	6 ft 11 in (2.11 m)	260 lb (118 kg)	Sr	Hawaii	Colorado Springs, Colorado
F	35	N.J. Benson	6 ft 8 in (2.03 m)	225 lb (102 kg)	So	Mt. Vernon Township High School	Mount Vernon, Illinois

Head coach

- Dana Ford (Illinois State)

Assistant coach(es)

- Sheldon Everett (South Carolina)
- Buzzy Caruthers (Hampton)
- Jay Spoonhour (Pittsburg State)

Legend

- (C) Team captain
- (S) Suspended
- (I) Ineligible
- (W) Walk-on
- Injured
- Current redshirt

Roster
Last update: November 18, 2023

== Schedule and results ==
Date time, TV	Rank^{#}	Opponent^{#}	Result	Record	Site (attendance) city, state
Exhibition
November 2, 2023*; 7:00 pm		Westminster (MO)	W 100–51	–	Great Southern Bank Arena (1,292); Springfield, MO
Regular season
November 6, 2023*; 6:00 pm, ESPN+		at West Virginia	L 59–67	0–1	WVU Coliseum (9,691); Morgantown, WV
November 13, 2023*; 7:00 pm, ESPN+		Oral Roberts	W 84–69	1–1	Great Southern Bank Arena (3,248); Springfield, MO
November 17, 2023*; 7:00 pm, ESPN+		vs. Florida Gulf Coast; Paradise Jam first round	W 70–61	2–1	Sports and Fitness Center (724); Saint Thomas, USVI
November 19, 2023*; 7:00 pm, ESPN+		vs. Kent State; Paradise Jam semifinals	W 56–52	3–1	Sports and Fitness Center (924); Saint Thomas, USVI
November 20, 2023*; 7:00 pm, ESPN+		vs. Abilene Christian; Paradise Jam championship	W 87–69	4–1	Sports and Fitness Center (1,825); Saint Thomas, USVI
November 25, 2023*; 1:00 pm, ESPN+		South Carolina State	W 92–74	5–1	Great Southern Bank Arena (3,197); Springfield, MO
November 29, 2023; 7:00 pm, ESPN+		Evansville	W 90–78	6–1 (1–0)	Great Southern Bank Arena (3,692); Springfield, MO
December 2, 2023; 1:00 pm, ESPN+		at Drake	L 57–74	6–2 (1–1)	Knapp Center (3,562); Des Moines, IA
December 5, 2023*; 6:30 pm, ESPN+		at Middle Tennessee	L 73–77 ^{OT}	6–3	Murphy Center (2,605); Murfreesboro, TN
December 9, 2023*; 6:00 pm, ESPN+		Sam Houston	W 69–60	7–3	Great Southern Bank Arena (3,821); Springfield, MO
December 16, 2023*; 2:00 pm, ESPN+		at Tulsa	L 72–73	7–4	Reynolds Center (3,558); Tulsa, OK
December 19, 2023*; 7:00 pm, ESPN+		Lindenwood	W 79–57	8–4	Great Southern Bank Arena (2,031); Springfield, MO
December 23, 2023*; 7:00 pm, ESPN+		at Saint Mary's	W 69–64	9–4	University Credit Union Pavilion (3,412); Moraga, CA
January 3, 2024; 8:00 pm, ESPN+		Northern Iowa	L 62–64	9–5 (1–2)	Great Southern Bank Arena (3,276); Springfield, MO
January 6, 2024; 3:00 pm, ESPN+		at Bradley	L 60–86	9–6 (1–3)	Carver Arena (5,174); Peoria, IL
January 10, 2024; 7:00 pm, ESPN+		Murray State	L 53–77	9–7 (1–4)	Great Southern Bank Arena (2,109); Springfield, MO
January 13, 2024; 6:00 pm, ESPN+		at Evansville	W 74–64	10–7 (2–4)	Ford Center (3,978); Evansville, IN
January 16, 2024; 6:00 pm, ESPN+		at Indiana State	L 66–88	10–8 (2–5)	Hulman Center (4,803); Terre Haute, IN
January 20, 2024; 1:00 pm, ESPN+		Illinois State	L 60–69	10–9 (2–6)	Great Southern Bank Arena (2,103); Springfield, MO
January 24, 2024; 7:00 pm, ESPN+		Drake	W 83–80 ^{2OT}	11–9 (3–6)	Great Southern Bank Arena (2,461); Springfield, MO
January 27, 2024; 3:00 pm, ESPN+		at Valparaiso	W 81–70	12–9 (4–6)	Athletics–Recreation Center (1,591); Valparaiso, IN
January 31, 2024; 7:00 pm, ESPN+		at Southern Illinois	W 76–75 ^{OT}	13–9 (5–6)	Banterra Center (5,002); Carbondale, IL
February 3, 2024; 5:00 pm, ESPN+		Belmont	W 87–80	14–9 (6–6)	Great Southern Bank Arena (3,412); Springfield, MO
February 7, 2024; 7:00 pm, ESPN+		at Northern Iowa	L 65–72	14–10 (6–7)	McLeod Center (3,833); Cedar Falls, IA
February 10, 2024; 5:00 pm, ESPN+		Indiana State	L 71–73	14–11 (6–8)	Great Southern Bank Arena (3,517); Springfield, MO
February 14, 2024; 7:00 pm, ESPN+		at Murray State	L 72–82	14–12 (6–9)	CFSB Center (5,021); Murray, KY
February 17, 2024; 1:00 pm, ESPN+		Valparaiso	W 82–74	15–12 (7–9)	Great Southern Bank Arena (2,852); Springfield, MO
February 21, 2024; 7:00 pm, ESPN+		Bradley	L 62–86	15–13 (7–10)	Great Southern Bank Arena; Springfield, MO
February 24, 2024; 5:00 pm, ESPN+		at Belmont	L 78–93	15–14 (7–11)	Curb Event Center (3,261); Nashville, TN
February 28, 2024; 7:00 pm, ESPN+		at Illinois State	L 74–75	15–15 (7–12)	CEFCU Arena (4,287); Normal, IL
March 3, 2024; 2:00 pm, ESPN+		UIC	W 69–59	16–15 (8–12)	Great Southern Bank Arena; Springfield, MO
MVC Tournament
March 7, 2024; 12:00 pm, MVC TV	(9)	vs. (8) Murray State; Opening round	W 60–35	17–15	Enterprise Center; St. Louis, MO
March 8, 2024; 12:00 pm, MVC TV	(9)	vs. (1) Indiana State; Quarterfinals	L 59–75	17–16	Enterprise Center; St. Louis, MO
*Non-conference game. ^{#}Rankings from AP Poll. (#) Tournament seedings in parentheses. All times are in Central.
