= 2023–24 Valparaiso Beacons men's basketball team =

Basketball team season

2023–24 Valparaiso Beacons men's basketball
- Conference: Missouri Valley Conference
- Record: 7–25 (3–17 MVC)
- Head coach: Roger Powell Jr. (1st season)
- Assistant coaches: Pat Baldwin; Matt Gordon; A.J. Moye
- Home arena: Athletics–Recreation Center

2023–24 Missouri Valley Conference men's basketball standings
	Conf.				Overall
Team	W		L	PCT	W		L	PCT
Indiana State	17	–	3	.850	32	–	7	.821
Drake †	16	–	4	.800	28	–	7	.800
Bradley	13	–	7	.650	23	–	12	.657
Northern Iowa	12	–	8	.600	19	–	14	.576
Belmont	12	–	8	.600	20	–	13	.606
Southern Illinois	11	–	9	.550	19	–	13	.594
Illinois State	9	–	11	.450	15	–	17	.469
Murray State	9	–	11	.450	12	–	20	.375
Missouri State	8	–	12	.400	17	–	16	.515
Evansville	6	–	14	.300	17	–	18	.486
UIC	4	–	16	.200	12	–	21	.364
Valparaiso	3	–	17	.150	7	–	25	.219
† 2024 MVC tournament winner

The 2023–24 Valparaiso Beacons men's basketball team represented Valparaiso University during the 2023–24 NCAA Division I men's basketball season. The Beacons, led by first-year head coach Roger Powell Jr., played their home games at the Athletics–Recreation Center in Valparaiso, Indiana as members of the Missouri Valley Conference. They finished the season 7–24, 3–17 in MVC play to finish in last place. They lost to Belmont in the opening round of the MVC tournament.

== Previous season ==
The Beacons finished the 2022–23 season 11–20, 5–15 in MVC play to finish in tenth place. They lost to Murray State in the opening round of the MVC tournament. On March 23, head coach Matt Lottich was relieved of his duties, after seven years as head coach of the Beacons. On April 7, Gonzaga assistant coach Roger Powell Jr. was named as Lottich's successor.

== Roster ==
2023–24 Valparaiso Beacons men's basketball team
Players
Coaches

Pos.	#	Name	Height	Weight	Year	Previous school	Hometown
G	0	Jaxon Edwards	6 ft 5 in (1.96 m)	195 lb (88 kg)	So	Murray State	Indianapolis, Indiana
F	1	Jerome Palm	6 ft 10 in (2.08 m)	230 lb (104 kg)	Sr	Hillsborough CC	Almere, Netherlands
G/F	2	Connor Barrett	6 ft 6 in (1.98 m)	210 lb (95 kg)	Sr	Loyola Academy	Chicago, Illinois
G	3	Anthony Sciarroni (W)	6 ft 0 in (1.83 m)	195 lb (88 kg)	RS Sr	Alderson Broaddus	Columbus, Ohio
G	4	Sherman Weatherspoon IV	6 ft 2 in (1.88 m)	180 lb (82 kg)	Fr	Golden State Prep	Bowie, Maryland
F	5	Ola Ajiboye	6 ft 7 in (2.01 m)	200 lb (91 kg)	So	Central Michigan	Chicago, Illinois
G	6	Darius DeAveiro	6 ft 0 in (1.83 m)	170 lb (77 kg)	Jr	Orangeville Prep	Kanata, Ontario
G	7	Jahari Williamson	6 ft 1 in (1.85 m)	165 lb (75 kg)	Fr	Royal Crown Academy	Pickering, Ontario
F	10	Lucas Scroggins	6 ft 9 in (2.06 m)	190 lb (86 kg)	Fr	Bosco Institute	Woodbridge, Virginia
F	13	Cooper Schwieger	6 ft 9 in (2.06 m)	210 lb (95 kg)	Fr	Link Year Prep	Overland Park, Kansas
G	19	Isaiah Stafford	6 ft 2 in (1.88 m)	175 lb (79 kg)	Jr	John A. Logan College	Bolingbrook, Illinois
G	20	Joe Vick (W)	6 ft 2 in (1.88 m)	195 lb (88 kg)	So	Kouts HS	Kouts, Indiana
F	21	Kaspar Sepp	6 ft 7 in (2.01 m)	220 lb (100 kg)	Fr	Fairmont Academy	Tartu, Estonia
C	34	Lual Manyang	6 ft 10 in (2.08 m)	210 lb (95 kg)	RS Fr	Hofstra	Twic, South Sudan
G/F	35	Luke Carroll (W)	6 ft 4 in (1.93 m)	235 lb (107 kg)	So	Lake Land College	Westfield, Indiana

Head coach

- Roger Powell Jr. (Illinois)

Assistant coach(es)

- Pat Baldwin (Northwestern)
- Matt Gordon (Illinois State)
- A.J. Moye (Indiana)

Legend

- (C) Team captain
- (S) Suspended
- (I) Ineligible
- (W) Walk-on
- Injured
- Current redshirt

Roster
Last update: October 19, 2023

== Schedule and results ==
Date time, TV	Rank^{#}	Opponent^{#}	Result	Record	Site (attendance) city, state
Exhibition
November 1, 2023*; 7:00 p.m.		Saint Mary-of-the-Woods	W 82–71		Athletics–Recreation Center; Valparaiso, IN
Regular season
November 6, 2023*; 7:00 p.m., ESPN+		Trinity Christian	W 100–61	1–0	Athletics–Recreation Center (1,900); Valparaiso, IN
November 10, 2023*; 8:00 p.m., ESPN+		IUPUI	L 56–66	1–1	Athletics–Recreation Center (1,809); Valparaiso, IN
November 14, 2023*; 7:00 p.m., ESPN+		Green Bay	W 64–59	2–1	Athletics–Recreation Center (1,207); Valparaiso, IN
November 17, 2023*; 7:00 p.m., B1G+		at No. 23 Illinois	L 64–87	2–2	State Farm Center (14,894); Champaign, IL
November 21, 2023*; 7:00 p.m., ESPN+		Western Illinois	W 73–66	3–2	Athletics–Recreation Center (1,257); Valparaiso, IN
November 25, 2023*; 3:00 p.m., ESPN+		Southern	W 71–59	4–2	Athletics–Recreation Center (1,098); Valparaiso, IN
November 29, 2023; 7:00 p.m., ESPN+		Drake	L 65–83	4–3 (0–1)	Athletics–Recreation Center (1,474); Valparaiso, IN
December 2, 2023; 1:00 p.m., ESPN+		at Belmont	L 68–77	4–4 (0–2)	Curb Event Center (1,532); Nashville, TN
December 6, 2023*; 6:00 p.m., ESPN3/ESPN+		at Central Michigan	L 67–71	4–5	McGuirk Arena (1,193); Mount Pleasant, MI
December 9, 2023*; 11:00 a.m., The CW		at Virginia Tech	L 50–71	4–6	Cassell Coliseum (6,107); Blacksburg, VA
December 16, 2023*; 3:00 p.m., ESPN+		Chicago State	L 62–63	4–7	Athletics–Recreation Center (1,222); Valparaiso, IN
December 19, 2023*; 1:00 p.m., ESPN+		Samford	L 61–79	4–8	Athletics–Recreation Center (1,100); Valparaiso, IN
December 29, 2023*; 1:00 p.m., FloHoops		at Elon	L 78–82	4–9	Schar Center (1,620); Elon, NC
January 3, 2024; 7:00 p.m., ESPN+		Bradley	L 61–86	4–10 (0–3)	Athletics–Recreation Center (1,328); Valparaiso, IN
January 6, 2024; 7:00 p.m., ESPN+		at UIC	L 64–70	4–11 (0–4)	Credit Union 1 Arena (1,689); Chicago, IL
January 10, 2024; 7:00 p.m., ESPN+		Southern Illinois	L 68–77	4–2 (0–5)	Athletics–Recreation Center (1,294); Valparaiso, IN
January 14, 2024; 2:00 p.m., ESPN+		at Illinois State	W 59–50	5–12 (1–5)	CEFCU Arena (3,062); Normal, IL
January 17, 2024; 7:00 p.m., ESPN+		at Evansville	L 75–78	5–13 (1–6)	Ford Center (4,080); Evansville, IN
January 20, 2024; 3:00 p.m., ESPN+		UIC	W 84–77	6–13 (2–6)	Athletics–Recreation Center (1,407); Valparaiso, IN
January 24, 2024; 7:00 p.m., ESPN+		at Southern Illinois	L 69–75	6–14 (2–7)	Banterra Center (3,923); Carbondale, IL
January 27, 2024; 3:00 p.m., ESPN+		Missouri State	L 70–81	6–15 (2–8)	Athletics–Recreation Center (1,591); Valparaiso, IN
January 31, 2024; 7:00 p.m., ESPN+		at Drake	L 70–81	6–16 (2–9)	Knapp Center (3,323); Des Moines, IA
February 3, 2024; 3:00 p.m., ESPN+		Evansville	L 62–63	6–17 (2–10)	Athletics–Recreation Center (1,807); Valparaiso, IN
February 7, 2024; 6:00 p.m., ESPN+		at Indiana State	L 61–101	6–18 (2–11)	Hulman Center (5,716); Terre Haute, IN
February 10, 2024; 3:00 p.m., ESPN+		Belmont	L 78–96	6–19 (2–12)	Athletics–Recreation Center (1,499); Valparaiso, IN
February 14, 2024; 7:00 p.m., ESPN+		Northern Iowa	L 67–86	6–20 (2–13)	Athletics–Recreation Center (1,031); Valparaiso, IN
February 17, 2024; 1:00 pm, NBCSCHI+		at Missouri State	L 74–82	6–21 (2–14)	Great Southern Bank Arena (2,852); Springfield, MO
February 21, 2024; 7:00 p.m., ESPN+		Indiana State	L 64–83	6–22 (2–15)	Athletics–Recreation Center (2,428); Valparaiso, IN
February 24, 2024; 3:00 p.m., ESPN+		at Murray State	L 68–80	6–23 (2–16)	CFSB Center (5,807); Murray, KY
February 27, 2024; 7:00 p.m., ESPN+		at Northern Iowa	L 54–68	6–24 (2–17)	McLeod Center (3,580); Cedar Falls, IA
March 3, 2024; 1:00 p.m., ESPN+		Illinois State	W 75–72	7–24 (3–17)	Athletics–Recreation Center (1,676); Valparaiso, IN
MVC Tournament
March 7, 2024; 2:30 p.m., MVC TV	(12)	vs. (5) Belmont; Opening round	L 61–86	7–25	Enterprise Center (3,314); St. Louis, MO
*Non-conference game. ^{#}Rankings from AP Poll. (#) Tournament seedings in parentheses. All times are in Central Time.
