= 2023–24 Southern Illinois Salukis men's basketball team =

American college basketball season

2023–24 Southern Illinois Salukis men's basketball
- Conference: Missouri Valley Conference
- Record: 19–13 (11–9 MVC)
- Head coach: Bryan Mullins (5th season)
- Assistant coaches: Brendan Mullins; Jevon Mamon; Jerrance Howard; Vince Fritz
- Home arena: Banterra Center

2023–24 Missouri Valley Conference men's basketball standings
	Conf.				Overall
Team	W		L	PCT	W		L	PCT
Indiana State	17	–	3	.850	32	–	7	.821
Drake †	16	–	4	.800	28	–	7	.800
Bradley	13	–	7	.650	23	–	12	.657
Northern Iowa	12	–	8	.600	19	–	14	.576
Belmont	12	–	8	.600	20	–	13	.606
Southern Illinois	11	–	9	.550	19	–	13	.594
Illinois State	9	–	11	.450	15	–	17	.469
Murray State	9	–	11	.450	12	–	20	.375
Missouri State	8	–	12	.400	17	–	16	.515
Evansville	6	–	14	.300	17	–	18	.486
UIC	4	–	16	.200	12	–	21	.364
Valparaiso	3	–	17	.150	7	–	25	.219
† 2024 MVC tournament winner

The 2023–24 Southern Illinois Salukis men's basketball team represented Southern Illinois University Carbondale during the 2023–24 NCAA Division I men's basketball season. The Salukis, led by fifth-year head coach Bryan Mullins, played their home games at the Banterra Center in Carbondale, Illinois as members of the Missouri Valley Conference (MVC). The team finished the season 19–13, 11–9 in MVC play, to finish in sixth place. They were upset in the first round of the MVC tournament by UIC.

Following the season, the school fired head coach Bryan Mullins. On March 28, 2024, the school named Wright State head coach Scott Nagy the team's new head coach.

== Previous season ==
The Salukis finished the 2022–23 season 22–9, 14–6 in MVC play, to finish in a tie for third place. In the MVC tournament, they defeated Missouri State in the quarterfinals before falling to eventual tournament champions Drake in the semifinals.

== Roster ==
2023–24 Southern Illinois Salukis men's basketball team
Players
Coaches

Pos.	#	Name	Height	Weight	Year	Previous school	Hometown
G	0	Troy D'Amico	6 ft 7 in (2.01 m)	212 lb (96 kg)	Jr	Notre Dame College Prep	Chicago, IL
C	2	Scottie Ebube	6 ft 10 in (2.08 m)	273 lb (124 kg)	RS So	Mundelein High School	Mundelein, IL
F	4	Clarence Rupert	6 ft 8 in (2.03 m)	239 lb (108 kg)	So	Saint Peter's	Philadelphia, PA
G	5	Sheridan Sharp	6 ft 3 in (1.91 m)	180 lb (82 kg)	Fr	Ben Davis High School	Indianapolis, IN
G	10	Xavier Johnson	6 ft 1 in (1.85 m)	189 lb (86 kg)	GS	George Mason	Germantown, MD
G	12	Chris Cross	6 ft 2 in (1.88 m)	205 lb (93 kg)	Sr	Urbana High School	Urbana, IL
G	14	AJ Ferguson	6 ft 6 in (1.98 m)	195 lb (88 kg)	Jr	East Central	Houston, TX
C	21	Cade Hornecker	7 ft 0 in (2.13 m)	240 lb (109 kg)	So	Amarillo High School	Amarillo, TX
G	23	RJ McGee	6 ft 5 in (1.96 m)	205 lb (93 kg)	GS	Tulane	Chicago, IL
G	24	Trent Brown	6 ft 2 in (1.88 m)	188 lb (85 kg)	GS	Pinnacle High School	Scottsdale, AZ
G	25	Trey Miller	6 ft 2 in (1.88 m)	174 lb (79 kg)	So	Incarnate Word	Houston, TX
G	30	Kennard Davis	6 ft 6 in (1.98 m)	204 lb (93 kg)	Fr	Vashon High School	St. Louis, MO
F	32	Jarrett Hensley	6 ft 8 in (2.03 m)	212 lb (96 kg)	Sr	Cincinnati	Merriam, KS
G	33	Jovan Stulic	6 ft 6 in (1.98 m)	217 lb (98 kg)	GS	Little Rock	Prigrevica, Serbia

Head coach

- Bryan Mullins (Southern Illinois)

Assistant coach(es)

- Brendan Mullins (Saint Michael's)
- Jevon Marmon (Barat College)
- Jerrance Howard (Illinois)
- Vince Fritz (Missouri Southern)

Legend

- (C) Team captain
- (S) Suspended
- (I) Ineligible
- (W) Walk-on
- Injured
- Current redshirt

Roster
Last update: August 1, 2024

== Schedule and results ==
Date time, TV	Rank^{#}	Opponent^{#}	Result	Record	Site city, state
Regular season
November 6, 2023*; 7:00 p.m., ESPN+		Kentucky State	W 88–57	1–0	Banterra Center (4,510); Carbondale, IL
November 10, 2023*; 7:00 p.m., ESPN+		Queens	W 91–68	2–0	Banterra Center (5,183); Carbondale, IL
November 16, 2023*; 7:00 p.m., ESPN+		Chicago State; Cancún Challenge campus game	W 71–55	3–0	Banterra Center (3,910); Carbondale, IL
November 21, 2023*; 5:00 p.m., CBSSN		vs. No. 22 James Madison; Cancún Challenge Riviera Division semifinals	L 76–82	3–1	Hard Rock Hotel Riviera Maya (417); Cancún, Mexico
November 22, 2023*; 5:00 p.m., CBSSN		vs. New Mexico State; Cancún Challenge Riviera Division consolation	W 81–54	4–1	Hard Rock Hotel Riviera Maya (317); Cancún, Mexico
November 28, 2023; 6:00 p.m., ESPN+		at Indiana State	L 48–77	4–2 (0–1)	Hulman Center (4,009); Terre Haute, IN
December 2, 2023*; 2:30 p.m., ESPN+		Saint Louis	W 101–62	5–2	Banterra Center (5,021); Carbondale, IL
December 5, 2023*; 8:00 p.m., CBSSN		Oklahoma State	W 70–68	6–2	Banterra Center (5,610); Carbondale, IL
December 12, 2023*; 7:00 p.m., ESPN+		Austin Peay	L 68–70	6–3	Banterra Center (4,463); Carbondale, IL
December 16, 2023*; 6:00 p.m., ESPN+		at Wichita State	L 68–69	6–4	Charles Koch Arena (7,187); Wichita, KS
December 19, 2023*; 7:00 p.m., ESPN+		North Dakota State	W 76–63	7–4	Banterra Center (3,932); Carbondale, IL
December 22, 2023*; 6:00 p.m., ESPN+		Southern Indiana	W 81–50	8–4	Banterra Center (6,024); Carbondale, IL
December 30, 2023; 6:00 p.m., ESPN+		UIC	W 62–50	9–4 (1–1)	Banterra Center (7,004); Carbondale, IL
January 2, 2024; 7:00 p.m., ESPN+		Belmont	W 73–63	10–4 (2–1)	Banterra Center (4,324); Carbondale, IL
January 6, 2024; 7:00 p.m., ESPN+		at Illinois State	W 71–64	11–4 (3–1)	CEFCU Arena (4,852); Normal, IL
January 10, 2024; 7:00 p.m., ESPN+		at Valparaiso	W 77–68	12–4 (4–1)	Athletics–Recreation Center (1,294); Valparaiso, IN
January 13, 2024; 3:00 p.m., ESPN+		Drake	L 58–76	12–5 (4–2)	Banterra Center (6,013); Carbondale, IL
January 17, 2024; 7:00 p.m., ESPN+		Bradley	L 69–70	12–6 (4–3)	Banterra Center (4,614); Carbondale, IL
January 20, 2024; 7:00 p.m., CBSSN		at Northern Iowa	L 57–61	12–7 (4–4)	McLeod Center (3,926); Cedar Falls, IA
January 24, 2024; 7:00 p.m., ESPN+		Valparaiso	W 75–69	13–7 (5–4)	Banterra Center (3,923); Carbondale, IL
January 27, 2024; 1:00 p.m., Bally Sports Midwest		at Murray State	W 60–58	14–7 (6–4)	CFSB Center (6,757); Murray, KY
January 31, 2024; 7:00 p.m., ESPN+		Missouri State	L 75–76 ^{OT}	14–8 (6–5)	Banterra Center (5,002); Carbondale, IL
February 3, 2024; 5:00 p.m., ESPN+		at UIC	W 74–71	15–8 (7–5)	Credit Union 1 Arena (4,056); Chicago, IL
February 7, 2024; 7:00 p.m., ESPN+		at Drake	L 88–92 ^{OT}	15–9 (7–6)	Knapp Center (3,611); Des Moines, IA
February 10, 2024; 5:00 p.m., ESPN+		Illinois State	W 69–66	16–9 (8–6)	Banterra Center (5,212); Carbondale, IL
February 14, 2024; 6:30 p.m., ESPN+		at Belmont	L 68–82	16–10 (8–7)	Curb Event Center (1,231); Nashville, TN
February 17, 2024; 6:00 p.m., ESPN+		No. 23 Indiana State	W 74–69	17–10 (9–7)	Banterra Center (4,582); Carbondale, IL
February 21, 2024; 7:00 p.m., ESPN+		Murray State	W 72–68	18–10 (10–7)	Banterra Center (5,885); Carbondale, IL
February 25, 2024; 1:00 p.m., ESPN+		at Evansville	W 65–53	19–10 (11–7)	Ford Center (5,669); Evansville, IN
February 28, 2024; 7:00 p.m., ESPN+		at Bradley	L 67–86	19–11 (11–8)	Carver Arena (6,168); Peoria, IL
March 3, 2024; 1:00 p.m., ESPN+		Northern Iowa	L 70–82	19–12 (11–9)	Banterra Center (5,612); Carbondale, IL
MVC tournament
March 7, 2024; 8:30 p.m., MVC TV	(6)	vs. (11) UIC; Opening round	L 82–84 ^{2OT}	19–13	Enterprise Center; St. Louis, MO
*Non-conference game. ^{#}Rankings from AP poll. (#) Tournament seedings in parentheses. All times are in Central.
