= 2023–24 Northern Iowa Panthers men's basketball team =

American college basketball season

2023–24 Northern Iowa Panthers men's basketball
- Conference: Missouri Valley Conference
- Record: 19–14 (12–8 MVC)
- Head coach: Ben Jacobson (18th season)
- Associate head coach: P.J. Hogan
- Assistant coaches: Seth Tuttle; Gameli Ahelegbe
- Home arena: McLeod Center

2023–24 Missouri Valley Conference men's basketball standings
	Conf.				Overall
Team	W		L	PCT	W		L	PCT
Indiana State	17	–	3	.850	32	–	7	.821
Drake †	16	–	4	.800	28	–	7	.800
Bradley	13	–	7	.650	23	–	12	.657
Northern Iowa	12	–	8	.600	19	–	14	.576
Belmont	12	–	8	.600	20	–	13	.606
Southern Illinois	11	–	9	.550	19	–	13	.594
Illinois State	9	–	11	.450	15	–	17	.469
Murray State	9	–	11	.450	12	–	20	.375
Missouri State	8	–	12	.400	17	–	16	.515
Evansville	6	–	14	.300	17	–	18	.486
UIC	4	–	16	.200	12	–	21	.364
Valparaiso	3	–	17	.150	7	–	25	.219
† 2024 MVC tournament winner

The 2023–24 Northern Iowa Panthers men's basketball team represented the University of Northern Iowa during the 2023–24 NCAA Division I men's basketball season. The Panthers, led by 18th-year head coach Ben Jacobson, played their home games at the McLeod Center located in Cedar Falls, Iowa as members of the Missouri Valley Conference.

== Previous season ==
The Panthers finished the 2022–23 season 14–18, 9–11 in MVC play to finish in eighth place. In the MVC tournament, they defeated Illinois State in the opening round, before losing to Bradley in the quarterfinals.

== Roster ==
2023–24 Northern Iowa Panthers men's basketball team
Players
Coaches

Pos.	#	Name	Height	Weight	Year	Previous school	Hometown
G	0	Nate Heise	6 ft 5 in (1.96 m)	205 lb (93 kg)	Jr	Lincoln HS	Lake City, Minnesota
F	1	Cole Henry	6 ft 9 in (2.06 m)	240 lb (109 kg)	RS Jr	Oskaloosa HS	Oskaloosa, Iowa
G	2	Ege Peksari	6 ft 4 in (1.93 m)	195 lb (88 kg)	So	Sisli Terakki	İzmir, Turkey
G	3	Landon Wolf	6 ft 4 in (1.93 m)	195 lb (88 kg)	So	Cedar Falls HS	Cedar Falls, Iowa
G	4	Trey Campbell	6 ft 4 in (1.93 m)	185 lb (84 kg)	So	Cedar Falls HS	Cedar Falls, Iowa
G	5	Wes Rubin	6 ft 8 in (2.03 m)	225 lb (102 kg)	Fr	Simeon Career Academy	Chicago, Illinois
G	10	RJ Taylor	5 ft 11 in (1.8 m)	175 lb (79 kg)	Fr	Grand Blanc HS	Grand Blanc, Michigan
C	11	Jacob Hutson	6 ft 11 in (2.11 m)	250 lb (113 kg)	Jr	Loyola–Chicago	Edina, Minnesota
G	12	Charlie Miller (W)	6 ft 0 in (1.83 m)	165 lb (75 kg)	RS Fr	Lumberton HS	Lumberton, North Carolina
G	13	Bowen Born	5 ft 11 in (1.8 m)	170 lb (77 kg)	Sr	Norwalk HS	Norwalk, Iowa
G/F	15	Michael Duax	6 ft 6 in (1.98 m)	215 lb (98 kg)	So	Hempstead HS	Dubuque, Iowa
F	20	Chase Courbat	6 ft 9 in (2.06 m)	240 lb (109 kg)	So	Cedar Falls HS	Cedar Falls, Iowa
F	22	Kyle Pock	6 ft 6 in (1.98 m)	210 lb (95 kg)	Fr	Bolivar HS	Bolivar, Missouri
G	30	Hunter Jacobson (W)	6 ft 1 in (1.85 m)	180 lb (82 kg)	RS Fr	Cedar Falls HS	Cedar Falls, Iowa
G/F	32	Tytan Anderson	6 ft 6 in (1.98 m)	205 lb (93 kg)	Jr	North Scott HS	Eldridge, Iowa
G	33	Drew Daniel (W)	6 ft 7 in (2.01 m)	220 lb (100 kg)	Jr	Dowling Catholic HS	West Des Moines, Iowa

Head coach

- Ben Jacobson (North Dakota)

Assistant coach(es)

- P. J. Hogan (Morningside)
- Seth Tuttle (Northern Iowa)
- Gameli Ahelegbe (Minnesota State)

Legend

- (C) Team captain
- (S) Suspended
- (I) Ineligible
- (W) Walk-on
- Injured
- Current redshirt

Roster
Last update: November 18, 2023

== Schedule and results ==
Date time, TV	Rank^{#}	Opponent^{#}	Result	Record	Site (attendance) city, state
Exhibition
November 1, 2023*; 7:00 pm, ESPN+		Coe	W 103–65	–	McLeod Center; Cedar Falls, IA
Regular season
November 7, 2023*; 7:00 pm, ESPN+		at North Texas	L 77–83 ^{OT}	0–1	The Super Pit (4,415); Denton, TX
November 14, 2023*; 7:00 pm, ESPN+		Loras	W 90–50	1–1	McLeod Center (2,988); Cedar Falls, IA
November 19, 2023*; 4:00 pm, ESPN+		at South Florida	L 65–74	1–2	Yuengling Center (4,534); Tampa, FL
November 22, 2023*; 11:00 am, ESPN		vs. No. 14 North Carolina; Battle 4 Atlantis quarterfinals	L 69–91	1–3	Imperial Arena (1,342); Paradise Island, Bahamas
November 23, 2023*; 11:00 am, ESPN2		vs. Texas Tech; Battle 4 Atlantis consolation 2nd round	L 70–72	1–4	Imperial Arena (400); Paradise Island, Bahamas
November 24, 2023*; 7:30 pm, ESPN+		vs. Stanford; Battle 4 Atlantis 7th place game	W 73–51	2–4	Imperial Arena (611); Paradise Island, Bahamas
November 29, 2023; 7:00 pm, ESPN+		Belmont	L 70–90	2–5 (0–1)	McLeod Center (3,243); Cedar Falls, IA
December 2, 2023; 1:00 pm, ESPN+		at Evansville	L 89–91 ^{OT}	2–6 (0–2)	Ford Center (5,014); Evansville, IN
December 6, 2023*; 7:00 pm, ESPN+		Richmond	W 78–73	3–6	McLeod Center (3,153); Cedar Falls, IA
December 9, 2023*; 1:00 pm, ESPN+		at Toledo	L 80–84	3–7	Savage Arena (4,041); Toledo, OH
December 12, 2023*; 7:00 pm, ESPN+		Prairie View A&M	W 74–55	4–7	McLeod Center (3,117); Cedar Falls, IA
December 17, 2023*; 1:00 pm, ESPN+		Alcorn State	W 100–82	5–7	McLeod Center (3,201); Cedar Falls, IA
December 21, 2023*; 7:00 pm, ESPN+		at Northern Illinois	W 76–63	6–7	Convocation Center (803); DeKalb, IL
January 3, 2024; 8:00 pm, ESPN+		at Missouri State	W 64–62	7–7 (1–2)	Great Southern Bank Arena (3,276); Springfield, MO
January 7, 2024; 2:00 pm, ESPN+		Indiana State	L 66–77	7–8 (1–3)	McLeod Center (3,891); Cedar Falls, IA
January 10, 2024; 7:00 pm, ESPN+		UIC	W 67–59	8–8 (2–3)	McLeod Center (2,922); Cedar Falls, IA
January 14, 2024; 2:00 pm, ESPN+		at Murray State	W 70–60	9–8 (3–3)	CFSB Center (5,507); Murray, KY
January 17, 2024; 8:00 pm, CBSSN		at Belmont	W 83–72	10–8 (4–3)	Curb Event Center (1,141); Nashville, TN
January 20, 2024; 7:00 pm, CBSSN		Southern Illinois	W 61–57	11–8 (5–3)	McLeod Center (3,926); Cedar Falls, IA
January 23, 2024; 7:00 pm, ESPN+		Evansville	W 70–63	12–8 (6–3)	McLeod Center (3,257); Cedar Falls, IA
January 27, 2024; 5:00 pm, ESPN+		at Drake	L 63–77	12–9 (6–4)	Knapp Center (6,424); Des Moines, IA
January 31, 2024; 7:00 pm, CBSSN		at Bradley	L 69–85	12–10 (6–5)	Carver Arena (4,861); Peoria, IL
February 3, 2024; 5:00 pm, ESPN+		Murray State	L 43–71	12–11 (6–6)	McLeod Center (3,991); Cedar Falls, IA
February 7, 2024; 7:00 pm, ESPN+		Missouri State	W 72–65	13–11 (7–6)	McLeod Center (3,833); Cedar Falls, IA
February 11, 2024; 3:00 pm, ESPN+		at UIC	L 65–71	13–12 (7–7)	Credit Union 1 Arena (1,426); Chicago, IL
February 14, 2024; 7:00 pm, ESPN+		at Valparaiso	W 86–67	14–12 (8–7)	Athletics–Recreation Center (1,031); Valparaiso, IN
February 18, 2024; 3:00 pm, ESPN+		Bradley	W 74–63	15–12 (9–7)	McLeod Center (3,780); Cedar Falls, IA
February 21, 2024; 7:00 pm, ESPN+		at Illinois State	L 73–81	15–13 (9–8)	CEFCU Arena (3,922); Normal, IL
February 24, 2024; 5:00 pm, ESPN+		Drake	W 91–77	16–13 (10–8)	McLeod Center (4,674); Cedar Falls, IA
February 27, 2024; 7:00 pm, ESPN+		Valparaiso	W 68–54	17–13 (11–8)	McLeod Center (3,580); Cedar Falls, IA
March 3, 2024; 1:00 pm, ESPN+		at Southern Illinois	W 82–70	18–13 (12–8)	Banterra Center (5,612); Carbondale, IL
MVC Tournament
March 8, 2024; 2:30 pm, MVC TV	(4)	vs. (5) Belmont; Quarterfinals	W 67–62	19–13	Enterprise Center (5,403); St. Louis, MO
March 9, 2024; 2:30 pm, CBSSN	(4)	vs. (1) Indiana State; Semifinals	L 72–94	19–14	Enterprise Center; St. Louis, MO
*Non-conference game. ^{#}Rankings from AP Poll. (#) Tournament seedings in parentheses. All times are in Central.
