= 2023–24 Illinois State Redbirds men's basketball team =

Basketball team season

2023–24 Illinois State Redbirds men's basketball
- Conference: Missouri Valley Conference
- Record: 15–17 (9–11 MVC)
- Head coach: Ryan Pedon (2nd season)
- Assistant coaches: Rob Judson; Jason Slay; Andrew Dakich
- Home arena: Doug Collins Court at CEFCU Arena

2023–24 Missouri Valley Conference men's basketball standings
	Conf.				Overall
Team	W		L	PCT	W		L	PCT
Indiana State	17	–	3	.850	32	–	7	.821
Drake †	16	–	4	.800	28	–	7	.800
Bradley	13	–	7	.650	23	–	12	.657
Northern Iowa	12	–	8	.600	19	–	14	.576
Belmont	12	–	8	.600	20	–	13	.606
Southern Illinois	11	–	9	.550	19	–	13	.594
Illinois State	9	–	11	.450	15	–	17	.469
Murray State	9	–	11	.450	12	–	20	.375
Missouri State	8	–	12	.400	17	–	16	.515
Evansville	6	–	14	.300	17	–	18	.486
UIC	4	–	16	.200	12	–	21	.364
Valparaiso	3	–	17	.150	7	–	25	.219
† 2024 MVC tournament winner

The 2023–24 Illinois State Redbirds men's basketball team represented Illinois State University during the 2023–24 NCAA Division I men's basketball season. The Redbirds, led by second-year head coach Ryan Pedon, played their home games on Doug Collins Court at CEFCU Arena in Normal, Illinois as members of the Missouri Valley Conference.

== Previous season ==
The Redbirds finished the 2022–23 season 11–21, 6–14 in MVC play to finish in ninth place. They lost to Northern Iowa in the opening round of the MVC tournament.

== Roster ==
2023–24 Illinois State Redbirds men's basketball team
Players
Coaches

Pos.	#	Name	Height	Weight	Year	Previous school	Hometown
G	0	Luke Kasubke	6 ft 5 in (1.96 m)	190 lb (86 kg)	Sr	Kansas State	St. Louis, Missouri
G	1	Malachi Poindexter	6 ft 3 in (1.91 m)	190 lb (86 kg)	Sr	Virginia	Mineral, Virginia
G	2	Ty Pence	6 ft 6 in (1.98 m)	210 lb (95 kg)	Fr	St. Joseph-Ogden High School	St. Joseph, Illinois
G	3	Dalton Banks	6 ft 2 in (1.88 m)	190 lb (86 kg)	Sr	Southern Illinois	Eau Claire, Wisconsin
F	4	Myles Foster	6 ft 7 in (2.01 m)	235 lb (107 kg)	Sr	Monmouth	Brooklyn, New York
G	5	Jordan Davis	6 ft 4 in (1.93 m)	200 lb (91 kg)	Sr	Wisconsin	La Crosse, Wisconsin
G	10	Darius Burford	6 ft 0 in (1.83 m)	175 lb (79 kg)	Sr	Elon	Bolingbrook, Illinois
G	11	Johnny Kinziger	5 ft 11 in (1.8 m)	165 lb (75 kg)	Fr	De Pere High School	De Pere, Wisconsin
F	12	Brandon Lieb	7 ft 1 in (2.16 m)	230 lb (104 kg)	Sr	Illinois	Deerfield, Illinois
G	13	Ty Blake (W)	6 ft 4 in (1.93 m)	190 lb (86 kg)	Fr	University High School	Normal, Illinois
G	14	Nik Stadelman (W)	6 ft 0 in (1.83 m)	180 lb (82 kg)	Sr	Guilford High School	Rockford, Illinois
F	22	Kendall Lewis	6 ft 8 in (2.03 m)	210 lb (95 kg)	Sr	Appalachian State	Snellville, Georgia
F	23	Harouna Sissoko	6 ft 7 in (2.01 m)	217 lb (98 kg)	RS Sr	Grand View Christian School	Kayes, Mali
F	35	Chase Walker	6 ft 9 in (2.06 m)	290 lb (132 kg)	Fr	Saint Charles Prep	Columbus, Ohio
F	50	Ryan Schmitt	6 ft 11 in (2.11 m)	220 lb (100 kg)	Sr	Des Moines Area Community College	Van Meter, Iowa

Head coach

- Ryan Pedon (Wooster)

Assistant coach(es)

- Rob Judson (Illinois)
- Jason Slay (West Virginia State)
- Andrew Dakich (Michigan)

Legend

- (C) Team captain
- (S) Suspended
- (I) Ineligible
- (W) Walk-on
- Injured
- Current redshirt

Roster
Last update: October 27, 2023

== Schedule and results ==
Date time, TV	Rank^{#}	Opponent^{#}	Result	Record	High points	High rebounds	High assists	Site (attendance) city, state
Exhibition Season
October 29, 2023*; 3:15 pm		Illinois Wesleyan	W 78–46		19 – Burford	8 – Lewis, Lieb	3 – Banks, Lieb	CEFCU Arena (6,386); Normal, IL
Regular Season
November 6, 2023*; 7:00 pm, ESPN+		Lourdes	W 75–56	1–0	16 – Poindexter	7 – Poindexter	6 – Banks	CEFCU Arena (2,416); Normal, IL
November 11, 2023*; 7:00 pm, BSMW Extra/ESPN+		at Saint Louis	L 71–80	1–1	19 – Poindexter	12 – Lieb	3 – Banks, Foster	Chaifetz Arena (5,232); St. Louis, MO
November 15, 2023*; 7:00 pm, Marquee/ESPN+		Eastern Illinois	W 69–61	2–1	12 – Banks, Kasubke	12 – Lewis	4 – Lewis	CEFCU Arena (3,061); Normal, IL
November 20, 2023*; 12:30 pm, FloHoops		vs. Long Beach State; Gulf Coast Showcase; Quarterfinal	W 61–52	3–1	15 – Banks	10 – Foster	3 – Banks	Hertz Arena (214); Estero, FL
November 21, 2023*; 4:00 pm, FloHoops		vs. High Point; Gulf Coast Showcase; Semifinal	L 72–74	3–2	17 – Burford	7 – Lieb	1 – Banks, Kinziger, Poindexter	Hertz Arena (342); Estero, FL
November 22, 2023*; 4:00 pm, FloHoops		vs. Wright State; Gulf Coast Showcase; Third Place	L 49–74	3–3	9 – Burford, Lewis	5 – Foster, Lewis	2 – Banks	Hertz Arena (413); Estero, FL
November 30, 2023; 7:00 pm, ESPN+		at UIC	W 69–64	4–3 (1–0)	20 – Burford	8 – Foster	3 – Lewis	Credit Union 1 Arena (2,090); Chicago, IL
December 3, 2023; 2:00 pm, MVC TV Network/ESPN+		Murray State	W 76–72	5–3 (2–0)	14 – Lewis	5 – Banks, Foster, Lewis	7 – Banks	CEFCU Arena (3,946); Normal, IL
December 6, 2023*; 7:00 pm, ESPN+		Northern Kentucky	W 62–59	6–3	15 – Lewis	9 – Foster	4 – Banks	CEFCU Arena (3,215); Normal, IL
December 9, 2023*; 6:00 pm, ESPN+		Norfolk State; Return to Horton	L 58–64	6–4	13 – Kinziger	10 – Foster	4 – Banks	Horton Field House (3,788); Normal, IL
December 17, 2023*; 3:00 pm, ESPN+		North Dakota State	W 75–65	7–4	28 – Burford	8 – Davis	5 – Banks	CEFCU Arena (2,953); Normal, IL
December 21, 2023*; 7:00 pm, ESPN+		Southeast Missouri State	W 85–64	8–4	22 – Burford	9 – Lewis	5 – Banks	CEFCU Arena (3,361); Normal, IL
December 29, 2023*; 6:00 pm, SECN		at No. 8 Kentucky	L 70–96	8–5	20 – Foster	15 – Foster	7 – Banks	Rupp Arena (20,659); Lexington, KY
January 2, 2024; 8:00 pm, CBSSN		at Drake	L 71–88	8–6 (2–1)	14 – Burford	6 – Lieb	3 – Poindexter	The Knapp Center (2,931); Des Moines, IA
January 6, 2024; 7:00 pm, Marquee/ESPN+		Southern Illinois	L 64–71	8–7 (2–2)	17 – Foster	9 – Foster	4 – Foster	CEFCU Arena (4,852); Normal, IL
January 10, 2024; 6:30 pm, ESPN+		at Belmont	L 60–67	8–8 (2–3)	18 – Davis	9 – Foster	3 – Banks	Curb Event Center (1,660); Nashville, TN
January 14, 2024; 2:00 pm, ESPN+		Valparaiso	L 50–59	8–9 (2–4)	9 – Burford, Foster	8 – Davis, Lewis	6 – Banks	CEFCU Arena (3,062); Normal, IL
January 17, 2024; 7:00 pm, Marquee/ESPN+		Drake	L 56–77	8–10 (2–5)	14 – Burford	7 – Foster	4 – Kinziger	CEFCU Arena (3,681); Normal, IL
January 20, 2024; 1:00 pm, ESPN+		at Missouri State	W 69–60	9–10 (3–5)	22 – Burford	9 – Foster	5 – Banks	Great Southern Bank Arena (4,153); Springfield, MO
January 23, 2024; 7:00 pm, ESPN+		Belmont	W 77–67	10–10 (4–5)	19 – Foster	10 – Foster	5 – Foster	CEFCU Arena (2,860); Normal, IL
January 27, 2024; 1:00 pm, ESPN+		at Evansville	L 54–58	10–11 (4–6)	18 – Burford	11 – Lewis	2 – Kinziger	Ford Center (4,010); Evansville, IN
January 30, 2024; 7:00 pm, ESPN+		at Murray State	W 61–59	11–11 (5–6)	12 – Walker	12 – Foster	2 – Banks, Burford, Lewis	CFSB Center (5,817); Murray, KY
February 3, 2024; 1:00 pm, MVC TV Network/ESPN+		Bradley; I-74 Rivalry	L 60–73	11–12 (5–7)	16 – Poindexter	7 – Lewis	6 – Banks	CEFCU Arena (6,871); Normal, IL
February 7, 2024; 7:00 pm, Marquee/ESPN+		UIC	L 56–61	11–13 (5–8)	18 – Foster	10 – Foster, Lewis	5 – Kinziger	CEFCU Arena (4,394); Normal, IL
February 10, 2024; 6:00 pm, ESPN+		at Southern Illinois	L 66–69	11–14 (5–9)	17 – Foster	7 – Foster	4 – Banks	Banterra Center (5,212); Carbondale, IL
February 13, 2024; 6:00 pm, ESPN+		at No. 23 Indiana State	W 80–67	12–14 (6–9)	31 – Kinziger	13 – Lewis	3 – Foster	Hulman Center (5,988); Terre Haute, IN
February 18, 2024; 2:00 pm, ESPN+		Evansville	W 86–79	13–14 (7–9)	27 – Poindexter	9 – Lewis	7 – Kinziger	CEFCU Arena (6,072); Normal, IL
February 21, 2024; 7:00 pm, ESPN+		Northern Iowa	W 81–73	14–14 (8–9)	21 – Kinziger	14 – Foster	4 – Banks, Kinziger	CEFCU Arena (3,922); Normal, IL
February 24, 2024; 7:00 pm, ESPN+		at Bradley; I-74 Rivalry	L 45–48	14–15 (8–10)	10 – Kinziger	16 – Foster	4 – Banks	Carver Arena (9,201); Peoria, IL
February 28, 2024; 7:00 pm, ESPN+		Missouri State	W 75–74	15–15 (9–10)	20 – Kinziger, Poindexter	11 – Foster	6 – Banks	CEFCU Arena (4,287); Normal, IL
March 3, 2024; 1:00 pm, ESPN+		at Valparaiso	L 72–75	15–16 (9–11)	17 – Lewis, Poindexter	9 – Lewis	5 – Banks, Poindexter	Athletics–Recreation Center (1,676); Valparaiso, IN
Conference Tournament
March 7, 2024; 6:00 pm, MVC TV Network/ESPN+	(7)	vs. (10) Evansville; Arch Madness Opening Round	L 53–59	15–17	18 – Foster	9 – Foster, Kinziger	3 – Foster, Lewis, Poindexter	Enterprise Center (4,435); St. Louis, MO
*Non-conference game. ^{#}Rankings from AP Poll. (#) Tournament seedings in parentheses. All times are in Central Standard Time (CST).
