= 2023–24 Murray State Racers men's basketball team =

American college basketball season

2023–24 Murray State Racers men's basketball
- Conference: Missouri Valley Conference
- Record: 12–20 (9–11 MVC)
- Head coach: Steve Prohm (2nd in current stint, 6th overall season)
- Assistant coaches: Cole Christian; Antwon Jackson; Jonathan Mattox
- Home arena: CFSB Center

2023–24 Missouri Valley Conference men's basketball standings
	Conf.				Overall
Team	W		L	PCT	W		L	PCT
Indiana State	17	–	3	.850	32	–	7	.821
Drake †	16	–	4	.800	28	–	7	.800
Bradley	13	–	7	.650	23	–	12	.657
Northern Iowa	12	–	8	.600	19	–	14	.576
Belmont	12	–	8	.600	20	–	13	.606
Southern Illinois	11	–	9	.550	19	–	13	.594
Illinois State	9	–	11	.450	15	–	17	.469
Murray State	9	–	11	.450	12	–	20	.375
Missouri State	8	–	12	.400	17	–	16	.515
Evansville	6	–	14	.300	17	–	18	.486
UIC	4	–	16	.200	12	–	21	.364
Valparaiso	3	–	17	.150	7	–	25	.219
† 2024 MVC tournament winner

The 2023–24 Murray State Racers men's basketball team represented Murray State University in the 2023–24 NCAA Division I men's basketball season. The Racers were led by head coach Steve Prohm, who was in second season of his second stint (sixth overall) with the Racers, and played their home games at the CFSB Center in Murray, Kentucky as second-year members of the Missouri Valley Conference.

== Previous season ==
The Racers finished the 2022–23 season 16–14, 11–9 in MVC play to finish in sixth place. They defeated Valparaiso in the opening round of the MVC tournament before losing to Drake in the quarterfinals.

== Roster ==
2023–24 Murray State Racers men's basketball team
Players
Coaches

Pos.	#	Name	Height	Weight	Year	Previous school	Hometown
F	0	John McCrear	6 ft 8 in (2.03 m)	190 lb (86 kg)	Fr	Woodford County	Detroit, MI
G	2	Rob Perry	6 ft 4 in (1.93 m)	200 lb (91 kg)	Sr	Oak Ridge; Stetson	Orlando, FL
G	4	Patrick Chew	6 ft 3 in (1.91 m)	185 lb (84 kg)	RS Fr	Brophy College Preparatory	Phoenix, AZ
G	10	Quincy Anderson	6 ft 4 in (1.93 m)	205 lb (93 kg)	Sr	Oshkosh North; Minnesota State	Oshkosh, WI
G	11	Justin Morgan	6 ft 6 in (1.98 m)	210 lb (95 kg)	So	Memphis Home School Association	Memphis, TN
F	13	Alden Applewhite	6 ft 7 in (2.01 m)	190 lb (86 kg)	Jr	Houston; Portland; Mississippi State	Memphis, TN
G	14	Brian Moore, Jr.	6 ft 1 in (1.85 m)	185 lb (84 kg)	Jr	Kingston	Harlem, NY
F	22	Sam Murray II	6 ft 9 in (2.06 m)	200 lb (91 kg)	So	Harrison Central	Gulfport, MS
F	23	Nick Ellington	6 ft 7 in (2.01 m)	225 lb (102 kg)	Jr	Cardinal Ritter; Eastern Illinois	St. Louis, MO
G	24	JaCobi Wood	6 ft 2 in (1.88 m)	190 lb (86 kg)	Jr	Cleveland; Belmont	Clevelend, TN
G	25	Shawn Walker, Jr.	6 ft 6 in (1.98 m)	190 lb (86 kg)	Sr	Bishop Sullivan; Mercer; George Washington	Elizabeth City, NC
G	33	Lawrent Rice	6 ft 3 in (1.91 m)	160 lb (73 kg)	Fr	Wayne	Dayton, OH
G	34	Fletcher Boatright	6 ft 4 in (1.93 m)	190 lb (86 kg)	Fr	Northridge	Tuscaloosa, AL
F	44	Malek Abdelgowad	6 ft 10 in (2.08 m)	220 lb (100 kg)	Jr	South Plains College	Cairo, Egypt

Head coach

- Steve Prohm (Alabama)

Assistant coach(es)

- Cole Christian (Iowa State)
- Antwon Jackson (Pikeville)
- Jonathan Mattox (Emmanuel)

Legend

- (C) Team captain
- (S) Suspended
- (I) Ineligible
- (W) Walk-on
- Injured
- Current redshirt

Roster

== Schedule and results ==
Date time, TV	Rank^{#}	Opponent^{#}	Result	Record	High points	High rebounds	High assists	Site (attendance) city, state
Exhibition
November 1, 2023*; 7:00 p.m.		Brescia	W 90—69	−	18 – Moore, Jr.	10 – Morgan	7 – Woods	Racer Arena (5,557); Murray, KY
Regular season
November 6, 2023*; 7:00 p.m., ESPN+		Midway	W 91−58	1−0	22 – Ellington	12 – Ellington	5 – Wood	CFSB Center (4,527); Murray, KY
November 10, 2023*; 7:00 p.m., ESPN+		Tennessee Tech	W 78−72	2−0	16 – Perry	10 – Ellington	4 – Moore Jr.	CFSB Center (4,769); Murray, KY
November 14, 2023*; 7:00 p.m., ESPN+		Western Kentucky	L 81−86	2−1	21 – Perry	6 – Tied	5 – Moore Jr.	CFSB Center (5,677); Murray, KY
November 20, 2023*; 12:30 p.m.		vs. UNC Wilmington; Fort Myers Tip-Off Palms Division	L 81−83 ^{OT}	2−2	23 – Harden-Hayes	7 – Harden-Hayes	3 – Phillips	Suncoast Credit Union Arena (487); Fort Myers, FL
November 22, 2023*; 11:00 a.m.		vs. Appalachian State; Fort Myers Tip-Off Palms Division	L 57−67	2−3	18 – Moore Jr.	9 – Perry	3 – Wood	Suncoast Credit Union Arena (310); Fort Myers, FL
November 29, 2023; 7:00 p.m., ESPN+		Bradley	W 79–72	3–3 (1−0)	19 – Tied	7 – Ellington	2 – Tied	CFSB Center (5,211); Murray, KY
December 3, 2023; 2:00 p.m., ESPN+		at Illinois State	L 72–76	3–4 (1−1)	27 – Anderson	9 – Ellington	4 – Wood	CEFCU Arena (3,946); Normal, IL
December 9, 2023*; 6:15 p.m., ESPN+		at Austin Peay	L 49–53	3–5	12 – Moore Jr.	7 – Perry	3 – Tied	F&M Bank Arena (5,808); Clarksville, TN
December 13, 2023*; 6:30 p.m., SECN		at Mississippi State	L 81–85	3–6	21 – Perry	4 – Abdelgowad	10 – Wood	Humphrey Coliseum (6,804); Starkville, MS
December 16, 2023*; 3:00 p.m., ESPN+		Southeastern Louisiana	L 55–61	3–7	15 – Anderson	7 – Morgan	3 – Wood	CFSB Center (4,818); Murray, KY
December 18, 2023*; 6:30 p.m., ESPN+		at Little Rock	L 66–80	3–8	17 – Ellington	5 – Tied	8 – Wood	Jack Stephens Center (832); Little Rock, AR
December 22, 2023*; 5:00 p.m., CBSSN		SMU	L 65–92	3–9	18 – Anderson	7 – Applewhite	2 – Tied	CFSB Center (5,102); Murray, KY
December 30, 2023*; 3:00 p.m., ESPN+		Middle Tennessee	W 75–54	4–9	18 – Wood	8 – Ellington	5 – Perry	CFSB Center (5,303); Murray, KY
January 2, 2023; 7:00 p.m., ESPN+		UIC	W 85–73	5–9 (2–1)	20 – Moore Jr.	8 – Murray II	5 – Wood	CFSB Center (4,616); Murray, Kentucky
January 6, 2024; 1:00 p.m., ESPN+		at Evansville	W 81–59	6–9 (3–1)	17 – Perry	8 – Murray II	6 – Wood	Ford Center (7,928); Evansville, IN
January 10, 2024; 7:00 p.m., ESPN+		at Missouri State	W 77–53	7–9 (4–1)	19 – Wood	9 – Anderson	6 – Perry	Great Southern Bank Arena (2,109); Springfield, MO
January 14, 2024; 2:00 p.m., ESPN+		Northern Iowa	L 60–70	7–10 (4–2)	14 – Ellington	8 – Perry	3 – Perry	CFSB Center (5,507); Murray, KY
January 17, 2024; 7:00 p.m., ESPN+		at UIC	W 73–58	8–10 (5–2)	29 – Ellington	8 – Perry	5 – Tied	Credit Union 1 Arena (1,874); Chicago, IL
January 21, 2024; 4:00 p.m., ESPN2		Indiana State	L 63–72	8–11 (5–3)	21 – Anderson	10 – Ellington	3 – Tied	CFSB Center (6,017); Murray, Kentucky
January 24, 2024; 6:00 p.m., CBSSN		at Bradley	L 63–71	8–12 (5–4)	15 – Perry	8 – Ellington	7 – Wood	Carver Arena (4,581); Peoria, IL
January 27, 2024; 1:00 p.m., Bally Sports		Southern Illinois	L 58–60	8–13 (5–5)	14 – Tied	6 – Ellington	3 – Perry	CFSB Center (6,757); Murray, KY
January 30, 2024; 7:00 p.m., ESPN+		Illinois State	L 59–61	8–14 (5–6)	16 – Anderson	5 – Ellington	4 – Wood	CFSB Center (5,817); Murray, KY
February 3, 2024; 1:00 p.m., CBSSN		at Northern Iowa	W 71–43	9–14 (6–6)	17 – Perry	8 – Wood	3 – Wood	McLeod Center (3,991); Cedar Falls, IA
February 7, 2024; 7:00 p.m., Bally Sports		at Belmont	L 64–69	9–15 (6–7)	21 – Anderson	9 – Anderson	7 – Wood	Curb Event Center (1,652); Nashville, TN
February 10, 2024; 3:00 p.m., ESPN+		Evansville	W 73–70	10–15 (7–7)	20 – Anderson	8 – Anderson	5 – Wood	CFSB Center (5,517); Murray, KY
February 14, 2024; 7:00 p.m., ESPN+		Missouri State	W 82–72	11–15 (8–7)	23 – Ellington	8 – Wood	10 – Wood	CFSB Center (5,021); Murray, KY
February 18, 2024; 1:00 pm, ESPN Network		at Drake	L 72–95	11–16 (8–8)	22 – Anderson	7 – Ellington	2 – Tied	Knapp Center (4,329); Des Moines, IA
February 21, 2024; 7:00 pm, ESPN+		at Southern Illinois	L 68–72	11–17 (8–9)	17 – Wood	8 – Ellington	3 – Rice	Banterra Center (5,885); Carbondale, IL
February 24, 2024; 3:00 pm, ESPN+		Valparaiso	W 80–68	12–17 (9–9)	24 – Wood	11 – Ellington	3 – Wood	CFSB Center (5,807); Murray, KY
February 28, 2024; 7:00 p.m., ESPN+		Belmont	L 61–83	12–18 (9–10)	14 – Perry	8 – Perry	4 – Wood	CFSB Center (5,039); Murray, KY
March 3, 2024; 1:00 pm, ESPN+		at Indiana State	L 77–89	12–19 (9–11)	25 – Anderson	7 – Perry	2 – Rice	Hulman Center (8,142); Terre Haute, IN
MVC Tournament
March 7, 2024; 12:00 pm, MVC TV	(8)	vs. (9) Missouri State; Opening round	L 35–60	12–20	12 – Wood	9 – Ellington	2 – Applewhite	Enterprise Center; St Louis, MO
*Non-conference game. ^{#}Rankings from AP Poll. (#) Tournament seedings in parentheses. All times are in Central Time.

Schedule Source:
