= 2023–24 Evansville Purple Aces men's basketball team =

American college basketball season

2023–24 Evansville Purple Aces men's basketball

CBI, quarterfinals
- Conference: Missouri Valley Conference
- Record: 17–18 (6–14 MVC)
- Head coach: David Ragland (2nd season)
- Associate head coach: Craig Snow
- Assistant coaches: George Swanson; Roosevelt Jones; Peter Funk
- Home arena: Ford Center

2023–24 Missouri Valley Conference men's basketball standings
	Conf.				Overall
Team	W		L	PCT	W		L	PCT
Indiana State	17	–	3	.850	32	–	7	.821
Drake †	16	–	4	.800	28	–	7	.800
Bradley	13	–	7	.650	23	–	12	.657
Northern Iowa	12	–	8	.600	19	–	14	.576
Belmont	12	–	8	.600	20	–	13	.606
Southern Illinois	11	–	9	.550	19	–	13	.594
Illinois State	9	–	11	.450	15	–	17	.469
Murray State	9	–	11	.450	12	–	20	.375
Missouri State	8	–	12	.400	17	–	16	.515
Evansville	6	–	14	.300	17	–	18	.486
UIC	4	–	16	.200	12	–	21	.364
Valparaiso	3	–	17	.150	7	–	25	.219
† 2024 MVC tournament winner

The 2023–24 Evansville Purple Aces men's basketball team represented the University of Evansville during the 2023–24 NCAA Division I men's basketball season. The Purple Aces, led by second-year head coach David Ragland, played their home games at the Ford Center in Evansville, Indiana as members of the Missouri Valley Conference (MVC).

== Previous season ==
The Purple Aces finished the 2022–23 season 5–27, 1–19 in MVC play, to finish in last place. They lost to Indiana State in the first round of the MVC tournament.

== Roster ==
2023–24 Evansville Purple Aces men's basketball team
Players
Coaches

Pos.	#	Name	Height	Weight	Year	Previous school	Hometown
G	0	Gage Bobe	6 ft 0 in (1.83 m)	175 lb (79 kg)	Sr	South Knox High School	Vincennes, IN
G	1	Tanner Cuff	6 ft 7 in (2.01 m)	—	Jr	Salt Lake Community College	American Fork, UT
G	2	Antonio Thomas	6 ft 2 in (1.88 m)	185 lb (84 kg)	Sr	Kentucky Wesleyan	Memphis, TN
G	3	Cam Haffner	6 ft 2 in (1.88 m)	180 lb (82 kg)	So	Eastern Illinois	Westfield, IN
G	4	Chuck III Bailey	6 ft 5 in (1.96 m)	—	Fr	Hamtramck High School	Detroit, MI
G	5	Braylon Jackson	6 ft 5 in (1.96 m)	—	Fr	Oldsmar Christian Academy	Kennesaw, GA
F	10	Yacine Toumi	6 ft 10 in (2.08 m)	200 lb (91 kg)	Sr	Indian Hills Community College	Meudon, France
F	11	Joshua Hughes	6 ft 10 in (2.08 m)	—	Fr	Australian Institute of Sport	Sydney, Australia
G	12	Tyler Myers	5 ft 10 in (1.78 m)	—	Fr	Evansville Day School	Evansville, IN
G/F	13	Ben Humrichous	6 ft 9 in (2.06 m)	—	Sr	Huntington	Tipton, IN
G	14	Gui Tesch	6 ft 9 in (2.06 m)	—	Fr	IMG Academy	Rio de Janeiro, Brazil
G	20	Kenny Jr. Strawbridge	6 ft 6 in (1.98 m)	202 lb (92 kg)	Sr	Alabama State	Rockford, IL
F	22	Sekou Kalle	6 ft 10 in (2.08 m)	224 lb (102 kg)	Jr	Akron	Louisville, KY
G	23	Cameron Gehlhausen	6 ft 5 in (1.96 m)	—	So	Evansville North High School	Evansville, IN
F	32	Dakota Candler	6 ft 5 in (1.96 m)	—	Fr	South Knox High School	Vincennes, IN
C	33	Michael Day	6 ft 11 in (2.11 m)	—	Fr	Albuquerque Basketball Club Prep	Middleton, ID
G	40	Weston Aigner	6 ft 3 in (1.91 m)	—	Fr	Castle High School	Newburgh, IN

Head coach

- David Ragland (Evansville)

Assistant coach(es)

- Craig Snow (Evansville)
- George Swanson (Northwest)
- Roosevelt Jones (Butler)
- Peter Funk (Valparaiso)

Legend

- (C) Team captain
- (S) Suspended
- (I) Ineligible
- (W) Walk-on
- Injured
- Current redshirt

Roster
Last update: November 17, 2023

== Schedule and results ==
Date time, TV	Rank^{#}	Opponent^{#}	Result	Record	Site (attendance) city, state
Exhibition
October 28, 2023*; 1:00 p.m.		Wabash	W 76–66	–	Ford Center (3,027); Evansville, IN
Regular season
November 6, 2023*; 7:00 p.m., ESPN+		Miami (OH)	W 72–64	1–0	Ford Center (3,147); Evansville, IN
November 9, 2023*; 7:00 p.m., ESPN+		UHSP	W 116–46	2–0	Ford Center (2,817); Evansville, IN
November 15, 2023*; 6:30 p.m., ESPN+		at Southeast Missouri State	W 76–57	3–0	Show Me Center (1,023); Cape Girardeau, MO
November 18, 2023*; 1:00 p.m., ESPN+		Ball State	W 74–50	4–0	Ford Center (5,172); Evansville, IN
November 24, 2023*; 1:00 p.m., ESPN+		at Chattanooga; Coke Zero Sugar Classic	W 85–77 ^{OT}	5–0	McKenzie Arena (3,148); Chattanooga, TN
November 25, 2023*; 1:00 p.m., ESPN+		vs. Southeast Missouri State; Coke Zero Sugar Classic	W 93–74	6–0	McKenzie Arena (2,163); Chattanooga, TN
November 29, 2023; 7:00 p.m., ESPN+		at Missouri State	L 78–90	6–1 (0–1)	Great Southern Bank Arena (3,692); Springfield, MO
December 2, 2023; 1:00 p.m., ESPN+		Northern Iowa	W 91–89 ^{OT}	7–1 (1–1)	Ford Center (5,014); Evansville, IN
December 5, 2023*; 8:00 p.m., ESPN+		at No. 14 BYU	L 55–96	7–2	Marriott Center (13,291); Provo, UT
December 16, 2023*; 3:00 p.m., ESPN+		at Bellarmine	W 70–61	8–2	Freedom Hall (2,438); Louisville, KY
December 18, 2023*; 7:00 p.m., ESPN+		UT Martin	W 98–91	9–2	Ford Center (4,112); Evansville, IN
December 20, 2023*; 7:00 p.m., ESPN+		Tennessee Tech	W 82–51	10–2	Ford Center (4,715); Evansville, IN
December 29, 2023*; 6:00 p.m., ESPN+		at Cincinnati	L 58–76	10–3	Fifth Third Arena (10,977); Cincinnati, OH
January 3, 2024; 6:00 p.m., ESPN+		at Indiana State	L 73–87	10–4 (1–2)	Hulman Center (4,457); Terre Haute, IN
January 6, 2024; 1:00 p.m., ESPN+		Murray State	L 59–81	10–5 (1–3)	Ford Center (7,928); Evansville, IN
January 10, 2024; 7:00 p.m., ESPN+		at Bradley	L 50–86	10–6 (1–4)	Carver Arena (4,093); Peoria, IL
January 13, 2024; 6:00 p.m., ESPN+		Missouri State	L 64–74	10–7 (1–5)	Ford Center (3,978); Evansville, IN
January 17, 2024; 7:00 p.m., ESPN+		Valparaiso	W 78–75	11–7 (2–5)	Ford Center (4,080); Evansville, IN
January 20, 2024; 5:00 p.m., ESPN+		at Drake	L 48–97	11–8 (2–6)	Knapp Center (3,717); Des Moines, IA
January 23, 2024; 7:00 p.m., ESPN+		at Northern Iowa	L 63–70	11–9 (2–7)	McLeod Center (3,257); Cedar Falls, IA
January 27, 2024; 1:00 p.m., ESPN+		Illinois State	W 58–54	12–9 (3–7)	Ford Center (4,010); Evansville, IN
January 31, 2024; 7:00 p.m., ESPN+		UIC	W 77–60	13–9 (4–7)	Ford Center (3,679); Evansville, IN
February 3, 2024; 3:00 p.m., ESPN+		at Valparaiso	W 63–62	14–9 (5–7)	Athletics–Recreation Center (1,807); Valparaiso, IN
February 7, 2024; 7:00 p.m., ESPN+		Bradley	W 73–70	15–9 (6–7)	Ford Center (3,542); Evansville, IN
February 10, 2024; 5:00 p.m., ESPN+		at Murray State	L 70–73	15–10 (6–8)	CFSB Center (5,517); Murray, KY
February 13, 2024; 7:00 p.m., ESPN+		Drake	L 75–78	15–11 (6–9)	Ford Center (3,568); Evansville, IN
February 18, 2024; 3:00 p.m., ESPN+		at Illinois State	L 79–86	15–12 (6–10)	CEFCU Arena (6,072); Normal, IL
February 21, 2024; 7:00 p.m., ESPN+		at UIC	L 79–88	15–13 (6–11)	Credit Union 1 Arena (1,918); Chicago, IL
February 25, 2024; 1:00 p.m., ESPN+		Southern Illinois	L 53–65	15–14 (6–12)	Ford Center (5,669); Evansville, IN
February 28, 2024; 7:00 p.m., ESPN+		Indiana State	L 67–85	15–15 (6–13)	Ford Center (6,419); Evansville, IN
March 3, 2024; 4:00 p.m., ESPN+		at Belmont	L 66–83	15–16 (6–14)	Curb Event Center (2,437); Nashville, TN
MVC tournament
March 7, 2024; 6:00 p.m., MVC TV	(10)	vs. (7) Illinois State; Opening round	W 59–53	16–16	Enterprise Center; St. Louis, MO
March 8, 2024; 6:00 p.m., MVC TV	(10)	vs. (2) Drake; Quarterfinals	L 58–79	16–17	Enterprise Center; St. Louis, MO
CBI
March 24, 2024; 4:30 p.m., FloHoops	(11)	vs. (6) Quinnipiac; First round	W 64–63	17–17	Ocean Center (829); Daytona Beach, FL
March 25, 2024; 5:30 p.m., FloHoops	(11)	vs. (3) Seattle; Quarterfinals	L 57–71	17–18	Ocean Center (724); Daytona Beach, FL
*Non-conference game. ^{#}Rankings from AP poll. (#) Tournament seedings in parentheses. All times are in Central.
