= 2023–24 UIC Flames men's basketball team =

American college basketball season

2023–24 UIC Flames men's basketball
- Conference: Missouri Valley Conference
- Record: 12–21 (4–16 MVC)
- Head coach: Luke Yaklich (4th season)
- Assistant coaches: Will Veasley (4th season); Bill Wuczynski (3rd season); Tony Wills (1st season)
- Home arena: Credit Union 1 Arena

2023–24 Missouri Valley Conference men's basketball standings
	Conf.				Overall
Team	W		L	PCT	W		L	PCT
Indiana State	17	–	3	.850	32	–	7	.821
Drake †	16	–	4	.800	28	–	7	.800
Bradley	13	–	7	.650	23	–	12	.657
Northern Iowa	12	–	8	.600	19	–	14	.576
Belmont	12	–	8	.600	20	–	13	.606
Southern Illinois	11	–	9	.550	19	–	13	.594
Illinois State	9	–	11	.450	15	–	17	.469
Murray State	9	–	11	.450	12	–	20	.375
Missouri State	8	–	12	.400	17	–	16	.515
Evansville	6	–	14	.300	17	–	18	.486
UIC	4	–	16	.200	12	–	21	.364
Valparaiso	3	–	17	.150	7	–	25	.219
† 2024 MVC tournament winner

The 2023–24 UIC Flames men's basketball team represented the University of Illinois Chicago in the 2023–24 NCAA Division I men's basketball season. The Flames, led by fourth-year head coach Luke Yaklich, played their home games at Credit Union 1 Arena in Chicago, Illinois as members of the Missouri Valley Conference. The team finished the season 12–21, 4–16 in MVC play to finish in 11th place. They defeated Southern Illinois in the opening round of the MVC tournament before losing to Bradley.

On March 10, 2024, the school fired head coach Luke Yaklich. On April 1, the school named Stanford assistant coach Rob Ehsan the team's new head coach.

== Previous season ==
The Flames finished the 2022–23 season 12–19, 4–16 in MVC play to finish in 11th place. They lost to Missouri State in the opening round of the MVC tournament.

== Offseason ==
=== Departures ===
Departures
Name	Pos.	Height	Weight	Year	Hometown	Notes
Tre Anderson	G	6'1	185	Graduate Student	Tacoma, WA	Graduated
Jace Carter	G	6'5	210	Sophomore	Titusville, FL	Transferred to Texas A&M
Bessanty-Aime Saragba	C	6'10	215	Freshman	Marseille, France	Transferred to Eastern Illinois
Shaun Williams	G	6'4	190	Senior	St. Louis, MO	Graduated

=== Incoming transfers ===
Transfers
Name	Pos.	Height	Weight	Year	Hometown	Previous school
Marquise Kennedy	G	6'1	190	Graduate Student	Chicago, IL	Loyola
Isaiah Rivera	G	6'5	210	Senior	Geneseo, IL	Colorado State
Yusef Sahil	G	6'2	192	Junior	Gainesville, VA	Idaho

=== 2023 recruiting class ===
College recruiting information
Name	Hometown	School	Height	Weight	Commit date
Nathan Ojukwu; SF	Boise, ID	DME Academy	6 ft 6 in (1.98 m)	215 lb (98 kg)	May 31, 2023
Nathan Ojukwu; SF	Recruit ratings: (NR)				
Overall recruit ranking:
Note: In many cases, Scout, Rivals, 247Sports, On3, and ESPN may conflict in their listings of height and weight.; In these cases, the average was taken. ESPN grades are on a 100-point scale.; Sources: "2023 Team Ranking". Rivals.

== Roster ==
2023–24 UIC Flames men's basketball team
Players
Coaches

Pos.	#	Name	Height	Weight	Year	Hometown
G	0	Drew King	6 ft 3 in (1.91 m)	189 lb (86 kg)	So	Phoenix, Arizona
G	1	Isaiah Rivera	6 ft 5 in (1.96 m)	210 lb (95 kg)	Sr	Geneseo, Illinois
G	2	Steven Clay	6 ft 4 in (1.93 m)	185 lb (84 kg)	So	Milwaukee, Wisconsin
G	3	CJ Jones	6 ft 5 in (1.96 m)	195 lb (88 kg)	So	East St. Louis, Illinois
G	4	Ethan Picket	6 ft 4 in (1.93 m)	205 lb (93 kg)	Jr	Pensacola, Florida
G	5	Toby Okani	6 ft 8 in (2.03 m)	210 lb (95 kg)	Sr	Orange, New Jersey
G	10	Ethyn Brown	5 ft 11 in (1.8 m)	185 lb (84 kg)	So	Belleville, Illinois
G	13	Nathan Ojukwu	6 ft 6 in (1.98 m)	215 lb (98 kg)	Fr	Boise, Idaho
G	14	Marquise Kennedy	6 ft 1 in (1.85 m)	190 lb (86 kg)	GS	Chicago, Illinois
G	15	Griffin Yaklich (W)	6 ft 6 in (1.98 m)	200 lb (91 kg)	Sr	Joliet, Illinois
G	21	Khaled Khaled (W)	6 ft 3 in (1.91 m)	180 lb (82 kg)	Fr	Burbank, Illinois
G	22	Shaun Williams	6 ft 4 in (1.93 m)	190 lb (86 kg)	RS Sr	St. Louis, Missouri
G	23	Yusef Salih	6 ft 2 in (1.88 m)	192 lb (87 kg)	RS Jr	Gainesville, Virginia
F	33	Jaden Bronwell	6 ft 9 in (2.06 m)	230 lb (104 kg)	RS Fr	Sandy, Utah
G	34	Grant Welch (W)	6 ft 3 in (1.91 m)	187 lb (85 kg)	Fr	Moline, Illinois
F	50	Filip Skobalj	6 ft 7 in (2.01 m)	235 lb (107 kg)	RS Jr	Belgrade, Serbia
C	54	Cameron Fens	6 ft 10 in (2.08 m)	255 lb (116 kg)	So	Dubuque, Iowa

Head coach

- Luke Yaklich (Illinois State)

Assistant coach(es)

- Will Veasley (Butler)
- Bill Wuczynski (UNLV)
- Tony Wills (Illinois State)

Legend

- (C) Team captain
- (S) Suspended
- (I) Ineligible
- (W) Walk-on
- Injured
- Current redshirt

Roster
Last update: October 31, 2023

== Schedule and results ==
Date time, TV	Rank^{#}	Opponent^{#}	Result	Record	High points	High rebounds	High assists	Site (attendance) city, state
Exhibition
October 31, 2023*; 7:00 pm		Clayton State	W 71–47	–	–	–	–	Credit Union 1 Arena; Chicago, IL
Regular season
November 6, 2023*; 8:00 pm, ESPN+		at Cincinnati	L 58–69	0–1	20 – Okani	11 – Okani	3 – Okani	Fifth Third Arena (9,936); Cincinnati, OH
November 10, 2023*; 7:30 pm, ESPN+		Little Rock	W 86–71	1–1	25 – Rivera	10 – Okani	3 – Tied	Credit Union 1 Arena (2,593); Chicago, IL
November 14, 2023*; 7:00 pm, NBC Sports Chicago		at Loyola	W 72–67	2–1	23 – Rivera	8 – Okani	5 – Jones	Gentile Arena (2,659); Chicago, IL
November 19, 2023*; 4:00 p.m., ESPN+		Aurora	W 99–48	3–1	14 – Brownell	7 – Fens	8 – Jones	Credit Union 1 Arena (1,530); Chicago, IL
November 24, 2023*; 3:00 p.m., FloSports		vs. Middle Tennessee; Nassau Championship quarterfinals	W 70–40	4–1	18 – Clay	8 – Okani	5 – Jones	Baha Mar Convention Center (213); Nassau, Bahamas
November 25, 2023*; 6:00 p.m., FloSports		vs. George Washington; Nassau Championship semifinals	W 89–79	5–1	23 – Rivera	8 – Okani	7 – Jones	Baha Mar Convention Center (297); Nassau, Bahamas
November 26, 2023*; 6:00 p.m., FloSports		vs. UNC Greensboro; Nassau Championship Final	L 57–58	5–2	14 – Rivera	9 – Okani	5 – Jones	Baha Mar Convention Center (407); Nassau, Bahamas
November 30, 2023; 7:00 p.m., ESPN+		Illinois State	L 64–69	5–3 (0–1)	17 – Skobalj	6 – Okani	8 – Jones	Credit Union 1 Arena (2,090); Chicago, IL
December 8, 2023*; 6:00 p.m., ESPN+		at Jacksonville State	W 55–49	6–3	14 – Rivera	10 – Okani	4 – Jones	Pete Mathews Coliseum (1,657); Jacksonville, AL
December 12, 2023*; 7:00 p.m., ESPN+		Green Bay	L 68–70	6–4	15 – Okani	10 – Okani	3 – Tied	Credit Union 1 Arena (1,265); Chicago, IL
December 16, 2023*; 1:00 pm, ESPN+		Western Michigan	W 89–68	7–4	22 – Brownell	8 – Pickett	11 – Jones	Credit Union 1 Arena (1,329); Chicago, IL
December 21, 2023*; 1:00 pm, ESPN+		Incarnate Word	L 66–67	7–5	16 – Brownell	11 – Pickett	9 – Jones	Credit Union 1 Arena (1,154); Chicago, IL
December 30, 2023; 6:00 pm		at Southern Illinois	L 50–62	7–6 (0–2)	18 – Rivera	5 – Tied	3 – Salih	Banterra Center (7,004); Carbondale, IL
January 2, 2024; 7:00 pm, ESPN+		at Murray State	L 73–85	7–7 (0–3)	20 – Okani	6 – Okani	5 – Jones	CFSB Center (4,616); Murray, KY
January 6, 2024; 7:00 pm, ESPN+		Valparaiso	W 70–64	8–7 (1–3)	24 – Rivera	8 – Kennedy	4 – Rivera	Credit Union 1 Arena (1,689); Chicago, IL
January 10, 2024; 7:00 pm, ESPN+		Northern Iowa	L 59–67	8–8 (1–4)	13 – Clay	6 – Okani	4 – Okani	McLeod Center (2,922); Cedar Falls, IA
January 13, 2024; 1:00 pm, ESPN+		Bradley	L 59–77	8–9 (1–5)	25 – Jones	8 – Okani	6 – Okani	Credit Union 1 Arena (2,277); Chicago, IL
January 17, 2024; 7:00 pm, ESPN+		Murray State	L 58–73	8–10 (1–6)	16 – Rivera	8 – Okani	5 – Okani	Credit Union 1 Arena (1,874); Chicago, IL
January 20, 2024; 3:00 pm, ESPN3		at Valparaiso	L 77–84	8–11 (1–7)	18 – Jones	6 – Skobalj	8 – Jones	Athletics–Recreation Center (1,407); Valparaiso, IN
January 24, 2024; 7:00 pm, ESPN+		Indiana State	L 83–89	8–12 (1–8)	24 – Rivera	6 – Jones	7 – Jones	Credit Union 1 Arena (2,174); Chicago, IL
January 27, 2024; 4:00 pm, ESPN+		at Belmont	L 65–74	8–13 (1–9)	16 – Jones	7 – Okani	8 – Jones	Curb Event Center (2,429); Nashville, TN
January 31, 2024; 7:00 pm, ESPN+		at Evansville	L 60–77	8–14 (1–10)	15 – Rivera	12 – Okani	3 – Okani	Ford Center (3,679); Evansville, IN
February 3, 2024; 1:00 pm, ESPN+		Southern Illinois	L 71–74	8–15 (1–11)	28 – Rivera	11 – Okani	3 – Okani	Credit Union 1 Arena (4,056); Chicago, IL
February 7, 2024; 7:00 pm, ESPN+		at Illinois State	W 61–56	9–15 (2–11)	13 – Jones	11 – Okani	3 – Jones	CEFCU Arena (4,394); Normal, IL
February 11, 2024; 3:00 pm, ESPN+		Northern Iowa	W 71–65	10–15 (3–11)	24 – Jones	5 – Tied	4 – Rivera	Credit Union 1 Arena (1,426); Chicago, IL
February 14, 2024; 7:00 pm, ESPN+		at Bradley	L 73–85	10–16 (3–12)	27 – Rivera	5 – Fens	3 – Jones	Carver Arena (4,403); Peoria, IL
February 18, 2024; 1:00 pm, ESPN+		Belmont	L 60–75	10–17 (3–13)	17 – Okani	8 – Rivera	4 – Jones	Credit Union 1 Arena (1,815); Chicago, IL
February 21, 2024; 7:00 pm, ESPN+		Evansville	W 88–79	11–17 (4–13)	25 – Rivera	7 – Brownell	10 – Jones	Credit Union 1 Arena (1,918); Chicago, IL
February 24, 2024; 7:00 pm, NBC Sports Chicago		at Indiana State	L 73–88	11–18 (4–14)	16 – Rivera	6 – Brownell	4 – Jones	Hulman Center (8,061); Terre Haute, IN
February 28, 2024; 7:00 pm, ESPN+		Drake	L 105–107 ^{3OT}	11–19 (4–15)	31 – Okani	12 – Rivera	14 – Jones	Credit Union 1 Arena (2,126); Chicago, IL
March 3, 2024; 1:00 pm, ESPN+		at Missouri State	L 59–69	11–20 (4–16)	14 – Okani	7 – Okani	3 – Jones	Great Southern Bank Arena; Springfield, MO
Missouri Valley tournament
March 7, 2024; 8:30 pm, MVC TV	(11)	vs. (6) Southern Illinois; Opening round	W 84–82 ^{2OT}	12–20	28 – Rivera	9 – Tied	6 – Jones	Enterprise Center (4,435); St. Louis, MO
March 8, 2024; 8:30 pm, MVC TV	(11)	vs. (3) Bradley; Quarterfinals	L 47–74	12–21	10 – Ojukwu	5 – Tied	2 – Jones	Enterprise Center (5,813); St. Louis, MO
*Non-conference game. ^{#}Rankings from AP Poll. (#) Tournament seedings in parentheses. All times are in Central Time Zone.
