= 2023–24 Bradley Braves men's basketball team =

American college basketball season

2023–24 Bradley Braves men's basketball

SoCal Challenge Surf Division champions

NIT, second round
- Conference: Missouri Valley Conference
- Record: 23–12 (13–7 MVC)
- Head coach: Brian Wardle (9th season)
- Associate head coach: Mike Bargen
- Assistant coaches: Jimmie Foster; Mike Black
- Home arena: Carver Arena

2023–24 Missouri Valley Conference men's basketball standings
	Conf.				Overall
Team	W		L	PCT	W		L	PCT
Indiana State	17	–	3	.850	32	–	7	.821
Drake †	16	–	4	.800	28	–	7	.800
Bradley	13	–	7	.650	23	–	12	.657
Northern Iowa	12	–	8	.600	19	–	14	.576
Belmont	12	–	8	.600	20	–	13	.606
Southern Illinois	11	–	9	.550	19	–	13	.594
Illinois State	9	–	11	.450	15	–	17	.469
Murray State	9	–	11	.450	12	–	20	.375
Missouri State	8	–	12	.400	17	–	16	.515
Evansville	6	–	14	.300	17	–	18	.486
UIC	4	–	16	.200	12	–	21	.364
Valparaiso	3	–	17	.150	7	–	25	.219
† 2024 MVC tournament winner

The 2023–24 Bradley Braves men's basketball team represented Bradley University during the 2023–24 NCAA Division I men's basketball season. The Braves, led by ninth-year head coach Brian Wardle, played their home games at Carver Arena in Peoria, Illinois as members of the Missouri Valley Conference (MVC). They finished the season 23–12, 13–7 in MVC play, to finish in third place. They defeated UIC in the quarterfinals of the MVC tournament before losing to Drake. The Braves received a bid to the National Invitation Tournament as a No. 3 seed. They defeated Loyola Chicago before losing to Cincinnati in the second round.

== Previous season ==
The Braves finished the 2022–23 season 25–10, 16–4 in MVC play, to win the regular-season championship for the first time since 1996. They defeated Northern Iowa and Indiana State in the MVC tournament before losing to Drake in the championship game. As a regular-season champion who did not win their conference tournament, the Braves received an automatic bid to the NIT. There, they lost to Wisconsin in the first round.

== Roster ==
2023–24 Bradley Braves men's basketball team
Players
Coaches

Pos.	#	Name	Height	Weight	Year	Previous school	Hometown
G	0	Demarion Burch	6 ft 4 in (1.93 m)	200 lb (91 kg)	Fr	Milwaukee-Hamilton High School	Milwaukee, WI
F	1	Almar Atlason	6 ft 8 in (2.03 m)	230 lb (104 kg)	Fr	KR Reykjavík	Reykjavík, Iceland
G	2	Emarion Ellis	6 ft 5 in (1.96 m)	200 lb (91 kg)	RS So	Marquette	Davenport, IA
C	4	Ahmet Jonovic	7 ft 1 in (2.16 m)	260 lb (118 kg)	So	OKK Beograd	Prijepolje, Serbia
G/F	5	Christian Davis	6 ft 7 in (2.01 m)	200 lb (91 kg)	RS Jr	Le Moyne	Denver, CO
G	10	Connor Hickman	6 ft 3 in (1.91 m)	200 lb (91 kg)	Jr	Bloomington High School South	Bloomington, IN
G	12	Cade Hardtke (W)	6 ft 2 in (1.88 m)	190 lb (86 kg)	Jr	Glenbard South High School	Lombard, IL
G	13	Sam Hennessy (W)	6 ft 2 in (1.88 m)	185 lb (84 kg)	Jr	Benet Academy	Naperville, IL
F	14	Malevy Leons	6 ft 9 in (2.06 m)	210 lb (95 kg)	GS	Mineral Area College	IJmuiden, Netherlands
G	21	Duke Deen	5 ft 8 in (1.73 m)	170 lb (77 kg)	Sr	Troy	Shreveport, LA
F	24	Kyle Thomas	6 ft 10 in (2.08 m)	235 lb (107 kg)	So	Eastern Illinois	Bolingbrook, IL
F	25	Goanar Biliew	6 ft 8 in (2.03 m)	240 lb (109 kg)	Sr	Des Moines Area Community College	Denison, IA
F	34	Connor Linke	6 ft 9 in (2.06 m)	240 lb (109 kg)	Sr	St. Charles North High School	St. Charles, IL
F	35	Darius Hannah	6 ft 9 in (2.06 m)	205 lb (93 kg)	Sr	Milwaukee Academy of Science	Milwaukee, WI

Head coach

- Brian Wardle (Marquette)

Assistant coach(es)

- Mike Bargen (Marquette)
- Jimmie Foster (South Dakota)
- Mike Black (Albany)

Legend

- (C) Team captain
- (S) Suspended
- (I) Ineligible
- (W) Walk-on
- Injured
- Current redshirt

Roster
Last update: November 16, 2023

== Schedule and results ==
Date time, TV	Rank^{#}	Opponent^{#}	Result	Record	Site (attendance) city, state
Exhibition
November 1, 2023*; 7:00 p.m.		St. Ambrose	W 74–61	–	Carver Arena (3,841); Peoria, IL
Regular season
November 6, 2023*; 7:00 p.m., ESPN+		at UAB	W 73–71 ^{OT}	1–0	Bartow Arena (3,632); Birmingham, AL
November 11, 2023*; 7:00 p.m., ESPN+		Utah State	W 72–66 ^{OT}	2–0	Carver Arena (5,845); Peoria, IL
November 14, 2023*; 7:00 p.m., ESPN+		Tarleton State; SoCal Challenge campus site	W 86–63	3–0	Carver Arena (4,032); Peoria, IL
November 20, 2023*; 9:30 p.m., CBSSN		vs. Tulane; SoCal Challenge Surf Division semifinal	W 80–77	4–0	The Pavilion at JSerra (498); San Juan Capistrano, CA
November 22, 2023*; 9:30 p.m., CBSSN		vs. UTEP; SoCal Challenge Surf Division final	W 63–59	5–0	The Pavilion at JSerra (499); San Juan Capistrano, CA
November 25, 2023*; 7:00 p.m., ESPN+		Vermont	W 79–70	6–0	Carver Arena (5,068); Peoria, IL
November 29, 2023; 7:00 p.m., ESPN+		at Murray State	L 72–79	6–1 (0–1)	CFSB Center (5,211); Murray, KY
December 2, 2023; 1:00 p.m., ESPNU		Indiana State	L 77–85	6–2 (0–2)	Carver Arena (5,639); Peoria, IL
December 5, 2023*; 7:00 p.m., ESPN+		at Akron	L 52–67	6–3	James A. Rhodes Arena (3,100); Akron, OH
December 15, 2023*; 7:00 p.m., ESPN+		Cleveland State	L 69–76	6–4	Carver Arena (4,842); Peoria, IL
December 18, 2023*; 7:00 p.m.		vs. Duquesne	L 67–69	6–5	LeBron James Arena (1,375); Akron, OH
December 21, 2023*; 7:00 p.m., ESPN+		SIU Edwardsville	W 75–64	7–5	Carver Arena (4,875); Peoria, IL
December 28, 2023*; 7:00 p.m., ESPN+		Truman State	W 69–47	8–5	Carver Arena (4,866); Peoria, IL
January 3, 2024; 7:00 p.m., ESPN+		at Valparaiso	W 86–61	9–5 (1–2)	Athletics–Recreation Center (1,328); Valparaiso, IN
January 6, 2024; 3:00 p.m., ESPN+		Missouri State	W 86–60	10–5 (2–2)	Carver Arena (5,174); Peoria, IL
January 10, 2024; 7:00 p.m., ESPN+		Evansville	W 86–50	11–5 (3–2)	Carver Arena (4,093); Peoria, IL
January 13, 2024; 1:00 p.m., ESPN+		at UIC	W 77–59	12–5 (4–2)	Credit Union 1 Arena (1,328); Chicago, IL
January 17, 2024; 7:00 p.m., ESPN+		at Southern Illinois	W 70–69	13–5 (5–2)	Banterra Center (4,614); Carbondale, IL
January 20, 2024; 1:00 p.m., ESPN+		Belmont	W 95–72	14–5 (6–2)	Carver Arena (6,521); Peoria, IL
January 24, 2024; 6:00 p.m., ESPN+		Murray State	W 71–63	15–5 (7–2)	Carver Arena (4,581); Peoria, IL
January 27, 2024; 5:00 p.m., ESPN+		at Indiana State	L 86–95 ^{OT}	15–6 (7–3)	Hulman Center (8,223); Terre Haute, IN
January 31, 2024; 7:00 p.m., CBSSN		Northern Iowa	W 85–69	16–6 (8–3)	Carver Arena (4,861); Peoria, IL
February 3, 2024; 5:00 p.m., ESPN+		at Illinois State; I-74 Rivalry	W 73–60	17–6 (9–3)	CEFCU Arena (6,871); Normal, IL
February 7, 2024; 7:00 p.m., ESPN+		at Evansville	L 70–73	17–7 (9–4)	Ford Center (3,542); Evansville, IN
February 10, 2024; 5:00 p.m., ESPN+		Drake	L 67–74	17–8 (9–5)	Carver Arena (8,023); Peoria, IL
February 14, 2024; 7:00 p.m., ESPN+		UIC	W 85–73	18–8 (10–5)	Carver Arena (4,403); Peoria, IL
February 18, 2024; 3:00 p.m., ESPN+		at Northern Iowa	L 63–74	18–9 (10–6)	McLeod Center (3,780); Cedar Falls, IA
February 21, 2024; 7:00 p.m., ESPN+		at Missouri State	W 86–62	19–9 (11–6)	Great Southern Bank Arena (2,671); Springfield, MO
February 24, 2024; 5:00 p.m., ESPN+		Illinois State; I-74 Rivalry	W 48–45	20–9 (12–6)	Carver Arena (9,201); Peoria, IL
February 28, 2024; 7:00 p.m., ESPN+		Southern Illinois	W 86–67	21–9 (13–6)	Carver Arena (6,168); Peoria, IL
March 3, 2024; 1:00 p.m., ESPN+		at Drake	L 66–74	21–10 (13–7)	Knapp Center (6,051); Des Moines, IA
MVC tournament
March 8, 2024; 8:30 p.m., MVC TV	(3)	vs. (11) UIC; Quarterfinal	W 74–47	22–10	Enterprise Center (5,813); St. Louis, MO
March 9, 2024; 5:00 p.m., CBSSN	(3)	vs. (2) Drake; Semifinal	L 67–72	22–11	Enterprise Center (8,745); St. Louis, MO
NIT
March 20, 2024*; 6:00 p.m., ESPN+	(3)	Loyola Chicago; First round – Indiana State bracket	W 74–62	23–11	Carver Arena (4,691); Peoria, IL
March 23, 2024*; 1:00 p.m., ESPN+	(3)	at (2) Cincinnati; Second round – Indiana State bracket	L 57–74	23–12	Fifth Third Arena (4,732); Cincinnati, OH
*Non-conference game. ^{#}Rankings from AP poll. (#) Tournament seedings in parentheses. All times are in Central.
