= 2023–24 Drake Bulldogs men's basketball team =

American college basketball season

2023–24 Drake Bulldogs men's basketball

Missouri Valley tournament champions

NCAA tournament, First Round
- Conference: Missouri Valley Conference
- Record: 28–7 (16–4 MVC)
- Head coach: Darian DeVries (6th season)
- Assistant coaches: Marty Richter; Tom Ostrom; Brent Crews; Nick Norton; Cavel Witter
- Home arena: Knapp Center

2023–24 Missouri Valley Conference men's basketball standings
	Conf.				Overall
Team	W		L	PCT	W		L	PCT
Indiana State	17	–	3	.850	32	–	7	.821
Drake †	16	–	4	.800	28	–	7	.800
Bradley	13	–	7	.650	23	–	12	.657
Northern Iowa	12	–	8	.600	19	–	14	.576
Belmont	12	–	8	.600	20	–	13	.606
Southern Illinois	11	–	9	.550	19	–	13	.594
Illinois State	9	–	11	.450	15	–	17	.469
Murray State	9	–	11	.450	12	–	20	.375
Missouri State	8	–	12	.400	17	–	16	.515
Evansville	6	–	14	.300	17	–	18	.486
UIC	4	–	16	.200	12	–	21	.364
Valparaiso	3	–	17	.150	7	–	25	.219
† 2024 MVC tournament winner

The 2023–24 Drake Bulldogs men's basketball team represented Drake University in the 2023–24 NCAA Division I men's basketball season. The Bulldogs, led by sixth-year head coach Darian DeVries, played their home games at the Knapp Center in Des Moines, Iowa as members of the Missouri Valley Conference (MVC). They finished the regular season 25–6, 16–4 in MVC play to finish in second place. They entered the MVC tournament as a No. 2 seed, where they defeated Evansville, Bradley, and Indiana State to win the tournament championship. As a result, they received the conference's automatic bid to the NCAA tournament, where they were defeated by Washington State in the first round. Just three days after the loss, Darian DeVries accepted the head coaching position at West Virginia. Subsequently, most of the roster entered the transfer portal, including star Tucker DeVries.

== Previous season ==
The Bulldogs finished the regular season 27–7, 15–5 in MVC play to finish in second place. In the MVC tournament, they defeated Murray State, Southern Illinois, and Bradley to win the tournament championship. As a result, they received the conference's automatic bid to the NCAA tournament, where they were defeated by Miami (FL) in the first round.

== Offseason ==
=== Departures ===
Name	Number	Pos.	Height	Weight	Year	Hometown	Reason for departure
D. J. Wilkins	0	G	6'2"	188	GS	Merrillville, IN	Graduated
Roman Penn	1	G	6'0"	185	GS	Calumet City, IL	Graduated
Garrett Sturtz	3	G	6'3"	180	GS	Newton, IA	Graduated
Okay Djamgouz	10	G	6'6"	200	RS Jr	Toronto, Canada	Transferred to Maine
Bryceson Burns	11	G/F	6'5"	195	RS Fr	Houston, TX	Transferred to Midland
Issa Samake	13	F	6'8"	225	RS Soph	Des Moines, IA	Graduated/Transferred
Sardaar Calhoun	14	G/F	6'6"	200	Senior	Tappahannock, VA	Graduated

=== Incoming transfers ===
Name	Number	Pos.	Height	Weight	Year	Hometown	Previous School
Kyron Gibson	0	G	6'1"	198	Senior	Alexandria, LA	Transferred from UT Arlington
Atin Wright	10	G	6'1"	185	Junior	Hawthorne, CA	Transferred from Cal State Northridge
Carlos Rosario	13	F	6'7"	180	RS Sophomore	Santo Domingo, Dominican Republic	Transferred from Washington State
Ethan Roberts	23	G	6'5"	195	Sophomore	Arlington Heights, IL	Transferred from Army

== Preseason ==
The Bulldogs were picked to finish first in the conference's preseason poll for the third consecutive year. Forward Tucker DeVries was named MVC Preseason Player of the Year and selected to the preseason All-MVC first team.

== Roster ==
2023–24 Drake Bulldogs men's basketball team
Players
Coaches

Pos.	#	Name	Height	Weight	Year	Previous school	Hometown
G	0	Kyron Gibson	6 ft 1 in (1.85 m)	198 lb (90 kg)	Sr	UT Arlington; Peabody	Alexandria, LA
G	1	Kevin Overton	6 ft 5 in (1.96 m)	180 lb (82 kg)	Fr	Midwest City	Oklahoma City, OK
G	2	Brashon Hall (W)	6 ft 1 in (1.85 m)	185 lb (84 kg)	RS So	Oakland City; Centennial	Roswell, GA
G	3	Colby Garland	6 ft 1 in (1.85 m)	183 lb (83 kg)	Fr	Maumelle	Magnolia, AR
G	4	Conor Enright	6 ft 0 in (1.83 m)	180 lb (82 kg)	RS So	Mundelein	Mundelein, IL
F	9	Patrick Bath (W)	6 ft 9 in (2.06 m)	210 lb (95 kg)	Fr	Totino-Grace	Plymouth, MN
G	10	Atin Wright	6 ft 1 in (1.85 m)	185 lb (84 kg)	Jr	CSUN; Fairmount Prep	Hawthorne, CA
F	11	Bennett Fried (W)	6 ft 7 in (2.01 m)	170 lb (77 kg)	Fr	La Crosse Central	La Crosse, WI
G/F	12	Tucker DeVries	6 ft 7 in (2.01 m)	210 lb (95 kg)	Jr	Waukee	Waukee, IA
F	13	Carlos Rosario	6 ft 7 in (2.01 m)	180 lb (82 kg)	RS So	Washington State; Veritas Prep	Santo Domingo, Dominican Republic
G	20	Chico Johnson	6 ft 3 in (1.91 m)	180 lb (82 kg)	Fr	Central Catholic	Toledo, OH
G	21	Andrew Alia (W)	6 ft 2 in (1.88 m)	190 lb (86 kg)	Fr	St. Joseph	Kenosha, WI
G	22	Elijah Price	6 ft 2 in (1.88 m)	190 lb (86 kg)	Fr	St. Anthony	Long Beach, CA
G	23	Ethan Roberts (redshirt)	6 ft 5 in (1.96 m)	195 lb (88 kg)	So	Army; Hersey	Arlington Heights, IL
F	24	Nate Ferguson	6 ft 8 in (2.03 m)	220 lb (100 kg)	RS Jr	Lemont	Lemont, IL
F	35	Eric Northweather	6 ft 10 in (2.08 m)	225 lb (102 kg)	Jr	Truman State; Blair Oaks	Jefferson City, MO
F	51	Darnell Brodie	6 ft 10 in (2.08 m)	275 lb (125 kg)	GS	Seton Hall; Newark East Side	Newark, NJ

Head coach

- Darian DeVries (Northern Iowa)

Assistant coach(es)

- Marty Richter (Simpson)
- Tom Ostrom (Minnesota)
- Brent Crews (Florida Atlantic)

Legend

- (C) Team captain
- (S) Suspended
- (I) Ineligible
- (W) Walk-on
- Injured
- Current redshirt

Roster

== Schedule and results ==
Date time, TV	Rank^{#}	Opponent^{#}	Result	Record	High points	High rebounds	High assists	Site (attendance) city, state
Exhibition
November 2, 2023*; 7:00 pm		Truman State	W 95–50	–	19 – DeVries	8 – Brodie	5 – Garland	Knapp Center (2,712); Des Moines, IA
Regular season
November 8, 2023*; 7:00 pm, MC22		Lipscomb	W 85–70	1–0	36 – DeVries	7 – Brodie	6 – DeVries	Knapp Center (3,021); Des Moines, IA
November 14, 2023*; 7:00 pm, MC22		Southwest Minnesota State	W 87–67	2–0	25 – Wright	8 – DeVries	4 – DeVries	Knapp Center (2,430); Des Moines, IA
November 19, 2023*; 10:00 am, FloSports		vs. Oakland; Cayman Islands Classic First Round	W 85–77	3–0	22 – 2 Tied	11 – DeVries	5 – Enright	John Gray Gymnasium; George Town, Cayman Islands
November 20, 2023*; 12:30 pm, FloSports		vs. Stephen F. Austin; Cayman Islands Classic Semifinals	L 68–92	3–1	19 – Overton	6 – Brodie	4 – DeVries	John Gray Gymnasium; George Town, Cayman Islands
November 21, 2023*; 4:00 pm, FloSports		vs. Akron; Cayman Islands Classic 3rd Place Game	W 79–59	4–1	33 – DeVries	9 – DeVries	5 – Garland	John Gray Gymnasium; George Town, Cayman Islands
November 25, 2023*; 6:00 pm, ESPN+		Texas Southern	W 77–71	5–1	18 – Brodie	7 – DeVries	4 – Garland	Knapp Center (2,886); Des Moines, IA
November 29, 2023; 7:00 pm, ESPN+		at Valparaiso	W 83–65	6–1 (1–0)	21 – Brodie	9 – Brodie	3 – 3 Tied	Athletics–Recreation Center (1,474); Valparaiso, IN
December 2, 2023; 3:00 pm, ESPN+		Missouri State	W 74–57	7–1 (2–0)	24 – DeVries	9 – Brodie	5 – 2 Tied	Knapp Center (3,562); Des Moines, IA
December 6, 2023*; 7:00 pm, MC22		Saint Louis	W 75–69	8–1	22 – Wright	10 – DeVries	5 – DeVries	Knapp Center (3,124); Des Moines, IA
December 9, 2023*; 6:30 pm, BallerTV		vs. Nevada; Jack Jones Classic	W 72–53	9–1	25 – DeVries	8 – Brodie	5 – DeVries	Dollar Loan Center; Henderson, NV
December 14, 2023*; 7:00 pm, MC22		Grambling State	W 68–56	10–1	18 – Enright	7 – Brodie	4 – Overton	Knapp Center (2,864); Des Moines, IA
December 19, 2023*; 7:00 pm, MC22		Alcorn State	W 92–55	11–1	24 – Wright	12 – Brodie	4 – 2 Tied	Knapp Center (2,715); Des Moines, IA
December 22, 2023*; 2:00 pm, ESPN+		at UAB	L 78–79 ^{OT}	11–2	20 – Wright	15 – Brodie	5 – 2 Tied	Bartow Arena (3,496); Birmingham, AL
January 2, 2024; 8:00 pm, CBSSN		Illinois State	W 88–71	12–2 (3–0)	22 – DeVries	5 – 2 Tied	6 – DeVries	Knapp Center (2,931); Des Moines, IA
January 7, 2024; 2:00 pm, ESPN2		at Belmont	L 65–87	12–3 (3–1)	14 – Wright	9 – Brodie	6 – DeVries	Curb Event Center (2,186); Nashville, TN
January 10, 2024; 7:00 pm, MVC TV		Indiana State	W 89–78	13–3 (4–1)	29 – DeVries	6 – 3 Tied	4 – DeVries	Knapp Center (4,069); Des Moines, IA
January 13, 2024; 7:00 pm, ESPN2		at Southern Illinois	W 76–58	14–3 (5–1)	34 – DeVries	12 – Brodie	4 – 2 Tied	Banterra Center (6,013); Carbondale, IL
January 17, 2024; 7:00 pm, ESPN+		at Illinois State	W 77–56	15–3 (6–1)	25 – DeVries	12 – Brodie	5 – Brodie	CEFCU Arena (3,681); Bloomington, IL
January 20, 2024; 5:00 pm, MC22		Evansville	W 97–48	16–3 (7–1)	18 – 2 Tied	10 – Brodie	6 – Wright	Knapp Center (3,717); Des Moines, IA
January 24, 2024; 7:00 pm, ESPN+		at Missouri State	L 80–83 ^{2OT}	16–4 (7–2)	18 – 2 Tied	10 – DeVries	6 – Enright	Great Southern Bank Arena (2,461); Springfield, MO
January 27, 2024; 5:00 pm, ESPN+		Northern Iowa	W 77–63	17–4 (8–2)	29 – DeVries	8 – Brodie	6 – DeVries	Knapp Center (6,424); Des Moines, IA
January 31, 2024; 7:00 pm, MC22		Valparaiso	W 81–70	18–4 (9–2)	19 – Brodie	18 – Brodie	4 – 3 Tied	Knapp Center (3,323); Des Moines, IA
February 3, 2024; 5:00 pm, ESPN2		at Indiana State	L 67–75	18–5 (9–3)	26 – DeVries	10 – DeVries	3 – Wright	Hulman Center (8,332); Terre Haute, IN
February 7, 2024; 7:00 pm, MC22		Southern Illinois	W 92–88 ^{OT}	19–5 (10–3)	27 – DeVries	8 – Brodie	3 – Wright	Knapp Center (3,611); Des Moines, IA
February 10, 2024; 5:00 pm, ESPNU		at Bradley	W 74–67	20–5 (11–3)	22 – DeVries	10 – Enright	8 – Enright	Peoria Civic Center (8,023); Peoria, IL
February 13, 2024; 7:00 pm, ESPN+		at Evansville	W 78–75	21–5 (12–3)	26 – Wright	10 – DeVries	4 – DeVries	Ford Center (3,568); Evansville, IN
February 18, 2024; 1:00 pm, MVC TV		Murray State	W 95–72	22–5 (13–3)	23 – Overton	8 – Brodie	6 – Enright	Knapp Center (4,329); Des Moines, IA
February 21, 2024; 7:00 pm, MVC TV		Belmont	W 84–69	23–5 (14–3)	21 – DeVries	6 – DeVries	7 – Enright	Knapp Center (3,612); Des Moines, IA
February 24, 2024; 5:00 pm, ESPN+		at Northern Iowa	L 77–91	23–6 (14–4)	28 – DeVries	9 – DeVries	3 – Brodie	McLeod Center (4,674); Cedar Falls
February 28, 2024; 7:00 pm, ESPN+		at UIC	W 107–105 ^{3OT}	24–6 (15–4)	39 – DeVries	13 – DeVries	7 – DeVries	Credit Union 1 Arena (2,126); Chicago, IL
March 3, 2024; 2:30 pm, ESPN2		Bradley	W 74–66	25–6 (16–4)	29 – DeVries	6 – 2 Tied	5 – Enright	Knapp Center (6,051); Des Moines, IA
MVC Tournament
March 8, 2024; 6:00 pm, MVC TV	(2)	vs. (10) Evansville; Quarterfinals	W 79–58	26–6	19 – DeVries	6 – 2 Tied	6 – DeVries	Enterprise Center (5,813); St. Louis, MO
March 9, 2024; 5:00 pm, CBSSN	(2)	vs. (3) Bradley; Semifinals	W 72–67	27–6	20 – Wright	6 – 3 Tied	4 – 2 Tied	Enterprise Center (8,745); St. Louis, MO
March 10, 2024; 1:00 pm, CBS	(2)	vs. (1) Indiana State; Championship	W 84–80	28–6	27 – DeVries	8 – Brodie	5 – DeVries	Enterprise Center (6,837); St. Louis, MO
NCAA Tournament
March 21, 2024; 9:05 p.m., TruTV	(10 E)	vs. (7 E) No. 25 Washington State; First Round	L 61–66	28–7	20 – Wright	9 – Brodie	6 – DeVries	CHI Health Center (17,391); Omaha, NE
*Non-conference game. ^{#}Rankings from AP Poll. (#) Tournament seedings in parentheses. All times are in Central Time.

== Rankings ==
Ranking movements Legend: ██ Increase in ranking ██ Decrease in ranking — = Not ranked RV = Received votes
	Week																					
Poll	Pre	1	2	3	4	5	6	7	8	9	10	11	12	13	14	15	16	17	18	19	20	Final
AP	RV	RV	RV	—	—	—	—	—	—	—	—	—	—	—	—	RV	—	—	RV	RV	RV	
Coaches	—	—	—	—	—	RV	—	—	—	—	—	—	—	—	—	—	—	—	RV	RV	RV	—
