= 2024 Missouri Valley Conference men's basketball tournament =

American college basketball postseason tournament

- Tournament logo
- Classification: Division I
- Season: 2023–24
- Teams: 12
- Site: Enterprise Center; St. Louis, Missouri
- Champions: Drake (3rd title)
- Winning coach: Darian DeVries (2nd title)
- MVP: Tucker DeVries (Drake)
- Attendance: 34,547 (Total); 6,837 (Final)
- Television: CBS, CBSSN, MVC TV Network/ESPN+

2023–24 Missouri Valley Conference men's basketball standings
	Conf.				Overall
Team	W		L	PCT	W		L	PCT
Indiana State	17	–	3	.850	32	–	7	.821
Drake †	16	–	4	.800	28	–	7	.800
Bradley	13	–	7	.650	23	–	12	.657
Northern Iowa	12	–	8	.600	19	–	14	.576
Belmont	12	–	8	.600	20	–	13	.606
Southern Illinois	11	–	9	.550	19	–	13	.594
Illinois State	9	–	11	.450	15	–	17	.469
Murray State	9	–	11	.450	12	–	20	.375
Missouri State	8	–	12	.400	17	–	16	.515
Evansville	6	–	14	.300	17	–	18	.486
UIC	4	–	16	.200	12	–	21	.364
Valparaiso	3	–	17	.150	7	–	25	.219
† 2024 MVC tournament winner

The 2024 Missouri Valley Conference Men's Basketball Tournament, popularly referred to as "Arch Madness", was a postseason men's basketball tournament that completed the 2023–24 Missouri Valley Conference men's basketball season Missouri Valley Conference. The tournament was held at the Enterprise Center in St. Louis, Missouri from March 7–10, 2024.

== Seeds ==
Teams were seeded by conference record, with ties broken by the overall record in conference games played between the tied teams, then (if necessary) by NET ranking on the day following the last day of the regular season. The top four seeds received opening–round byes.

Seed	School	Conference	Tiebreaker 1	Tiebreaker 2
1	Indiana State	17–3		
2	Drake	16–4		
3	Bradley	13–7		
4	Northern Iowa	12–8	1–1 vs. Belmont	1-1 vs. Bradley
5	Belmont	12–8	1–1 vs. Northern Iowa	0-1 vs. Bradley
6	Southern Illinois	11–9		
7	Illinois State	9–11	2–0 vs. Murray State	
8	Murray State	9–11	0–2 vs. Illinois State	
9	Missouri State	8–12		
10	Evansville	6–14		
11	UIC	4–16		
12	Valparaiso	3–17		

== Schedule ==
Game	Time *	Matchup	Score	Attendance	Television
Opening Round – Thursday, March 7
1	12:00 pm	No. 8 Murray State vs. No. 9 Missouri State	35–60	3,314	MVC TV; Network
2	2:30 pm	No. 5 Belmont vs. No. 12 Valparaiso	86–61	3,314	MVC TV; Network
3	6:00 pm	No. 7 Illinois State vs. No. 10 Evansville	53–59	4,435	MVC TV; Network
4	8:30 pm	No. 6 Southern Illinois vs. No. 11 UIC	82–84 ^{2OT}	4,435	MVC TV; Network
Quarterfinals – Friday, March 8
5	12:00 pm	No. 1 Indiana State vs. No. 9 Missouri State	75–59	5,403	MVC TV; Network
6	2:30 pm	No. 4 Northern Iowa vs. No. 5 Belmont	67–62	5,403	MVC TV; Network
7	6:00 pm	No. 2 Drake vs. No. 10 Evansville	79–58	5,813	MVC TV; Network
8	8:30 pm	No. 3 Bradley vs. No. 11 UIC	74–47	5,813	MVC TV; Network
Semifinals – Saturday, March 9
9	2:30 pm	No. 1 Indiana State vs. No. 4 Northern Iowa	94–72	8,745	CBSSN
10	5:00 pm	No. 2 Drake vs. No. 3 Bradley	72–67	8,745	CBSSN
Final – Sunday, March 10
11	1:00 pm	No. 1 Indiana State vs. No. 2 Drake	80–84	6,837	CBS
* Game times in CST; rankings denote tournament seed.

== Bracket ==
Opening Round; Thursday, March 7 MVC TV Network
8	Murray State	35
9	Missouri State	60
5	Belmont	86
12	Valparaiso	61
7	Illinois State	53
10	Evansville	59
6	Southern Illinois	82 ^{2OT}
11	UIC	84

Quarterfinals; Friday, March 8 MVC TV Network
1	Indiana State	75
9	Missouri State	59
4	Northern Iowa	67
5	Belmont	62
2	Drake	79
10	Evansville	58
3	Bradley	74
11	UIC	47

Semifinals; Saturday, March 9 CBSSN
1	Indiana State	94
4	Northern Iowa	72
2	Drake	72
3	Bradley	67

Final; Sunday, March 10; CBS
1	Indiana State	80
2	Drake	84
