= Andrew Dakich =

American basketball coach

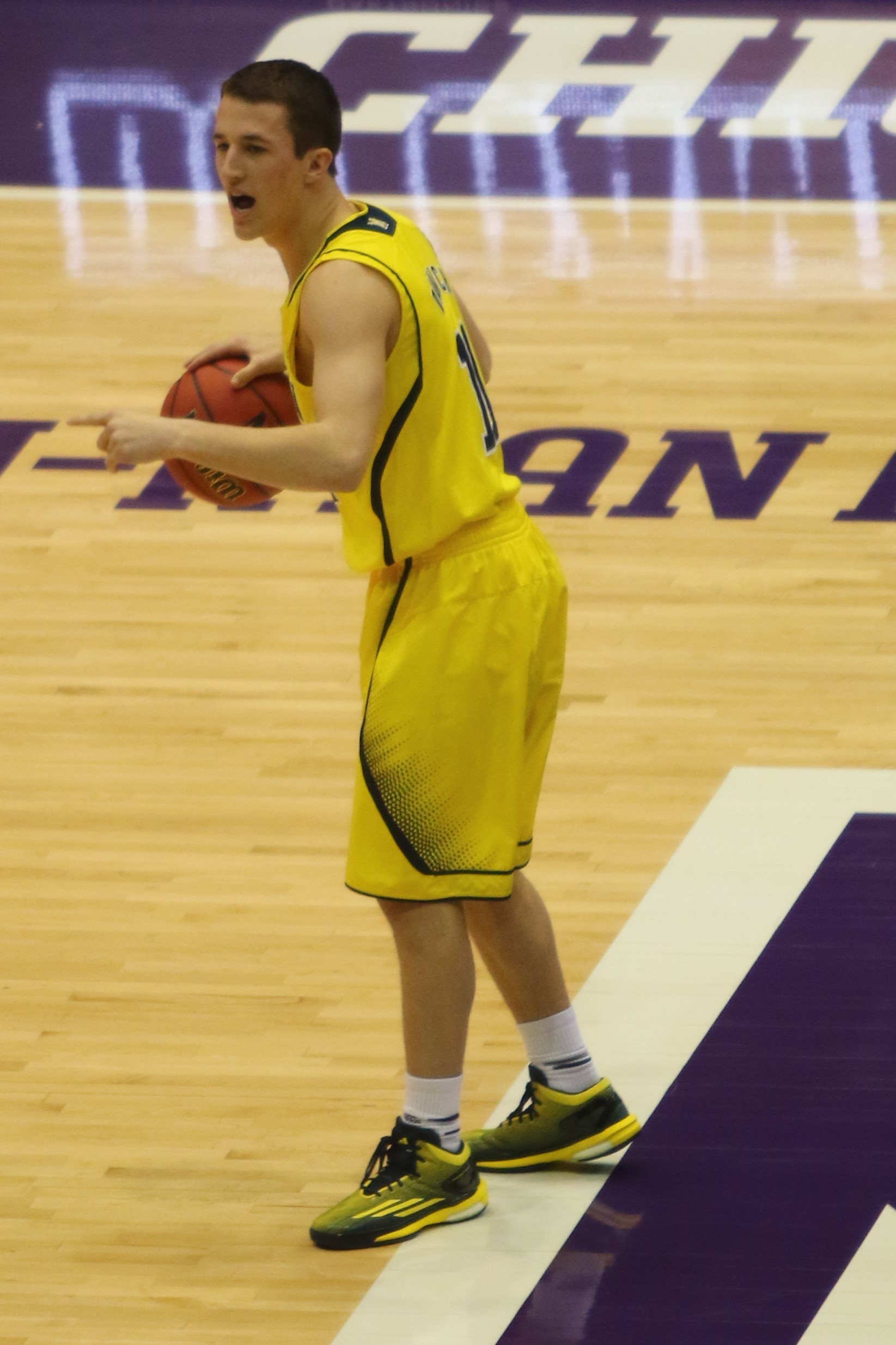
- Dakich in 2015

Current position
- Title: Assistant coach
- Team: Miami (OH)
- Conference: Mid American Conference

Biographical details
- Born: May 10, 1994 (age 32)

Playing career
- 2013–2016: Michigan
- 2017–2018: Ohio State
- Position: Point guard

Coaching career (HC unless noted)
- 2018–2019: Ohio State (student assistant)
- 2019–2020: Ohio State (program assistant)
- 2020–2022: Elon (D.B. Ops.)
- 2022–2026: Illinois State (Assistant coach)
- 2026–present: Miami (Assistant coach)

Andrew Dakich (born May 10, 1994) is an American former basketball player and current college basketball coach on the staff at Miami RedHawks as an assistant. He has previously served on the staff at Illinois State, Elon and Ohio State. He played college basketball at Michigan for parts of three season plus a redshirt season before a graduate transfer season at Ohio State. He was part of two Big Ten Conference champions at Michigan. He played varsity basketball for Zionsville Community High School. Dakich scored the gamewinning points in Zionsville's first Indiana High School Athletic Association (IHSAA) basketball sectional game win. He is the son and grandson of NCAA Division I basketball players.

== Early life ==
Andrew Dakich is the son of Dan and Jackie Dakich and has a younger sister Laura. His grandfather Thomas Dakich played at Idaho State and Bowling Green. His father played four years for Indiana Hoosiers men's basketball. Dan remarried in 2015. Between 1997–2007, Andrew was mostly based in Bowling Green, Ohio where Dan was the coach and Andrew was the ball boy for Bowling Green. The Dakiches were neighbors with Urban Meyer the year that he coached Bowling Green Falcons football, and Dakich was a regular playmate of Meyer's daughter.

== High school ==
Andrew played three years of varsity basketball at Zionsville Community High School. Prior to his sophomore season, he was listed at 5 ft 11 in (1.80 m) and Zionsville was ranked 19th coming off of an 18–5 season. After 19 games (12–7) Dakich had a 2.6 scoring average. Dan coached Andrew's Indiana Elite travel team, which included future Michigan teammate Mark Donnal.

As a junior, Dakich was listed as a 6 ft 2 in (1.88 m) tall junior and Zionsville was ranked 17th coming off of a 13–8 2010–11 season (Dakich's sophomore year). Despite having lost its leading scorer to suspension for the remainder of the season, Zionsville's found itself in overtime in its 2012 IHSAA Class 4A Sectional 8 first-round game against Fishers High School. Dakich made 4 consecutive free throws with 25 and 9 seconds left to give his team a 66–62 lead in overtime. Zionsville had never in school history won sectional game. Following his junior season, he visited Air Force and had interest from Army, Ball State, Florida Gulf Coast, IPFW and Western Michigan. During Dakich's junior year, 6 ft 9 in (2.06 m) freshman Derrik Smits played occasional varsity minutes, but was mostly used on junior varsity. That year Dakich averaged 9.5 points and 6 assists.

Zionsville entered Dakich's senior season ranked 8th, after a 15–7 season. When he went against future Michigan teammate Zak Irvin and Hamilton Southeastern High School on December 14, 2012, Dakich posted 23 points on 4–7 three-point shooting against 30 points by Irvin whose team prevailed 66–59. Andrew had an official preferred walk-on visit at Purdue and attended the game between the 2012–13 team and Michigan on March 6. Michigan won the game. In the subsequent weeks Dakich talked to Michigan coach John Beilein about a preferred walk-on visit. Andrew averaged 14.1 points, 4.7 rebounds and 5.1 assists as senior and 2013 IBCA/Subway Senior All-State honorable mention selection. In the end, his only athletic scholarship offers were from NCAA Division II schools. Dakich had walk-on offers from Butler and Purdue, but Michigan was coming off of a season in which they reached the championship game of the 2013 NCAA Division I men's basketball tournament and their prospects for vying for further national championships made them competitive with these two programs within 40 minutes of his home.

== College basketball ==
Dakich with Michigan teams

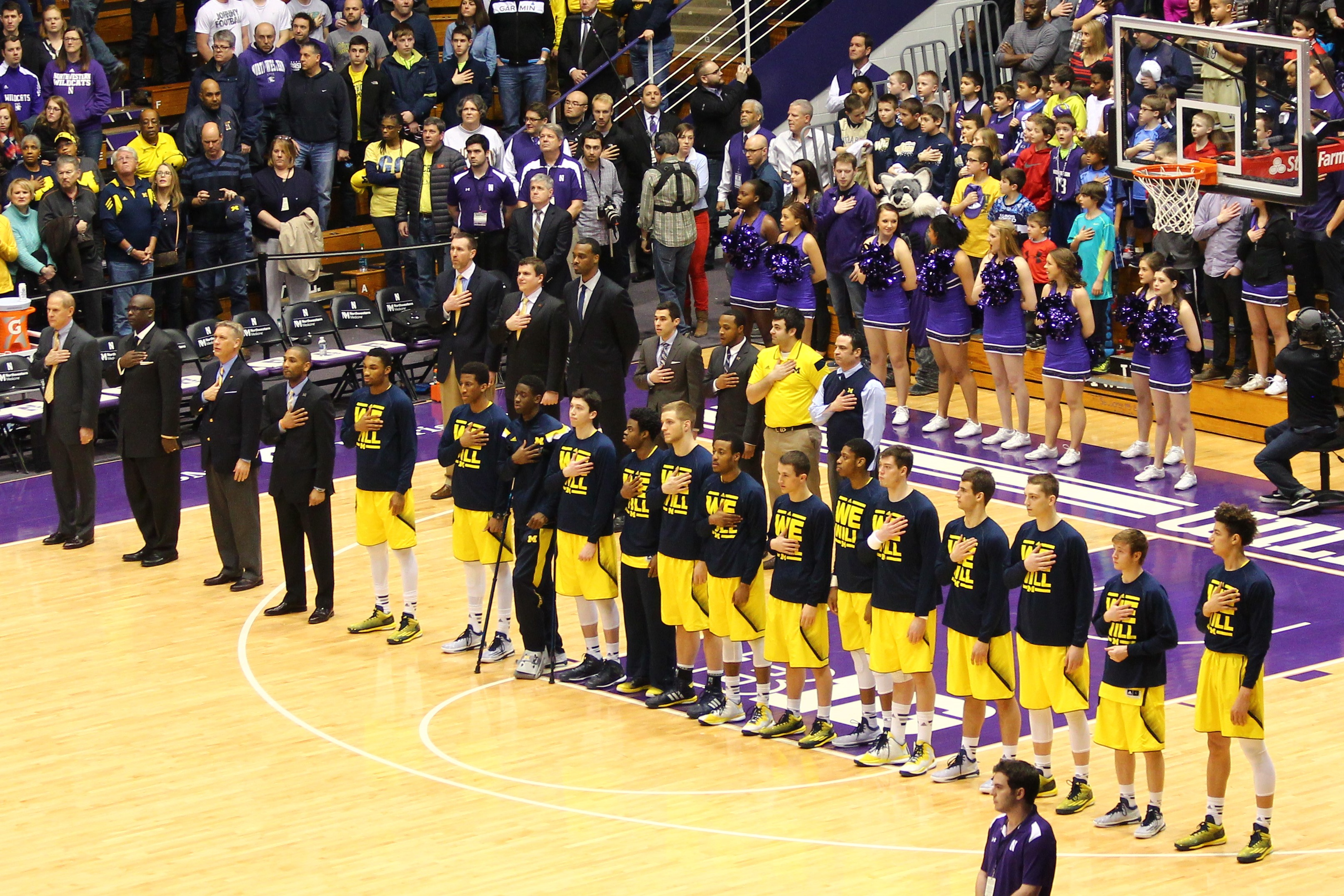
The 2014–15 Wolverines (Dakich 7th from right)

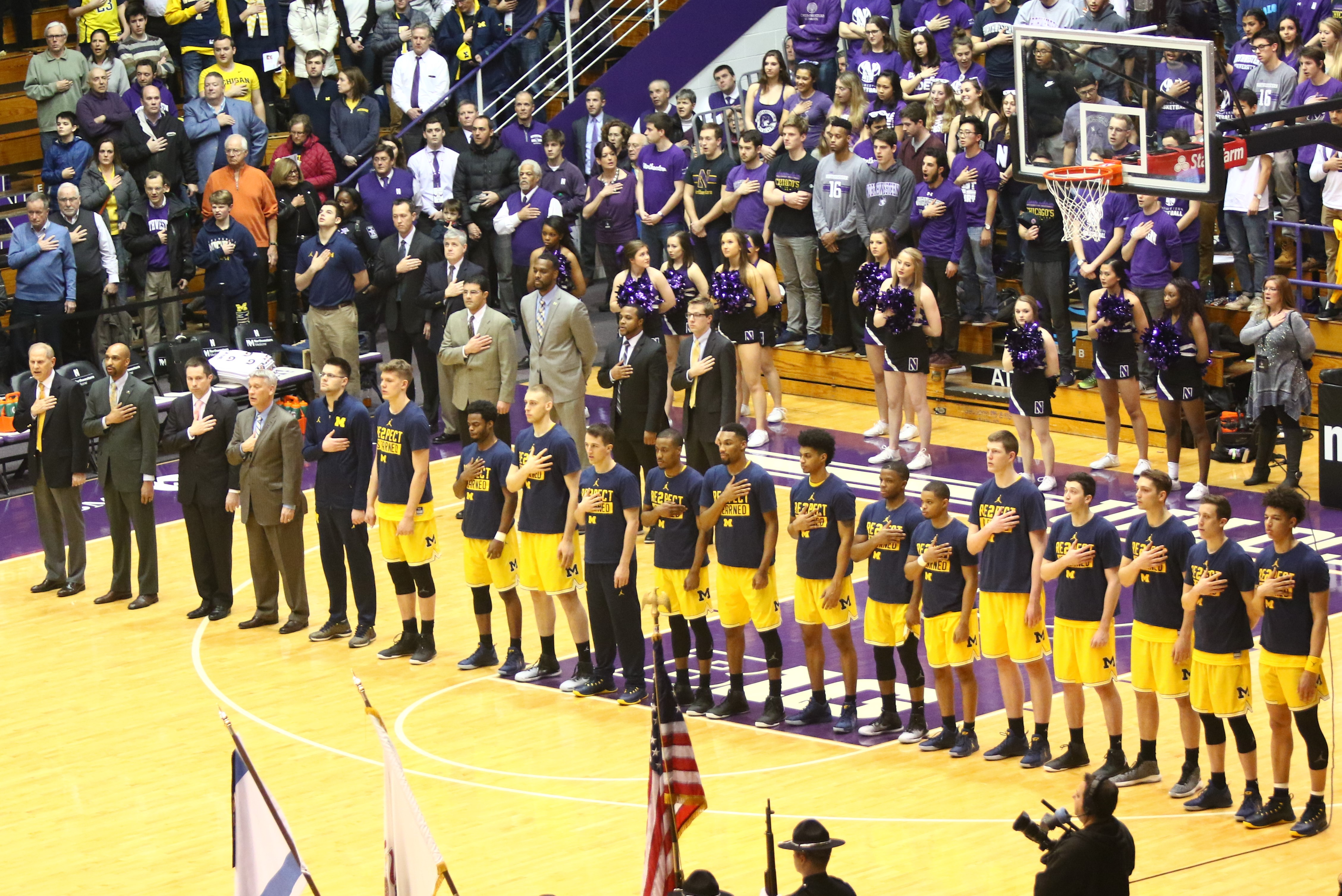
The 2016–17 Wolverines (Dakich 4th player from left in long pants)

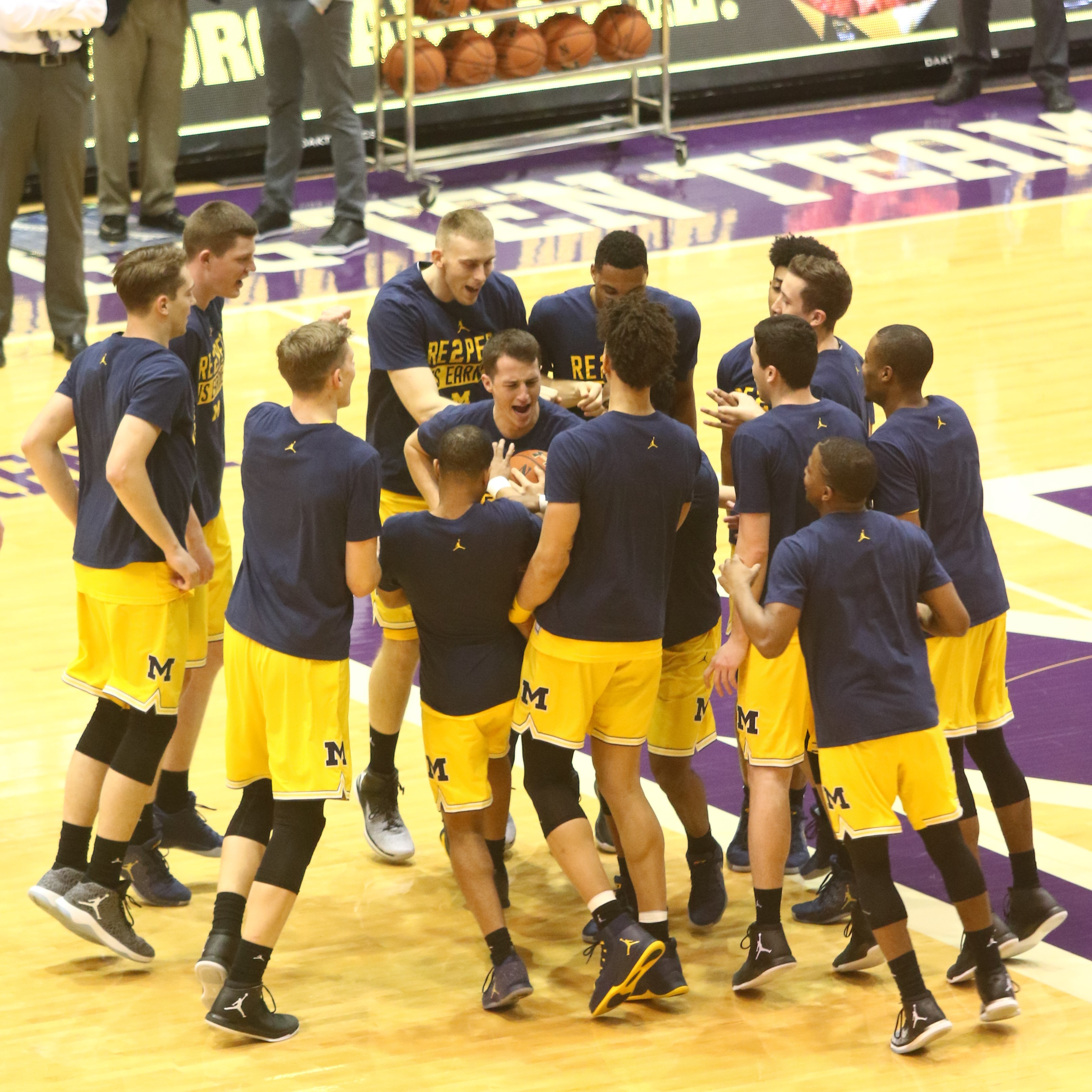
Dakich at the center of the 2016–17 Michigan Wolverines pregame celebration at Welsh-Ryan Arena

=== Michigan ===
Three walk-on members of the 2012–13 Michigan Wolverines men's basketball team were lost to graduation. On April 29, 2013, Andrew Dakich committed to Michigan as a preferred walk-on. Father Dan Dakich had employed Michigan assistant coach Jeff Meyer when Dakich had served as the interim head coach at Indiana for the 2007–08 Hoosiers. Dakich and Cole McConnell, another walk-on, joined the incoming class of Derrick Walton, Irvin and Donnal, which reported for summer practice on June 22, 2013. They were later joined by Sean Lonergan as a third walk-on.

Dakich posted his first career points on a three-point field goal against Houston Baptist on December 7, 2013. The basket helped Michigan tie a school single-game record with 16 made three-point shots. 2013–14 Michigan Wolverines men's basketball team clinched the school's first outright (unshared) Big Ten Conference championship since 1985–86. As a #2-seed, Michigan lost to Kentucky in the elite eight round of the 2014 NCAA Division I men's basketball tournament.

After Nik Stauskas left early for the NBA, Dakich changed from number 5 to number 11 to honor his father, while D. J. Wilson took over the number 5 jersey. In November 2014, head coach John Beilein announced that the team would redshirt Dakich so that he could play a fifth year somewhere else. Eventually, the 2014–15 Michigan Wolverines men's basketball team needed Dakich to expend his eligibility when Caris LeVert and Walton were injured. For the season, Dakich posted 5 points, 4 rebounds and 2 assists in 69 minutes spread over 13 games.

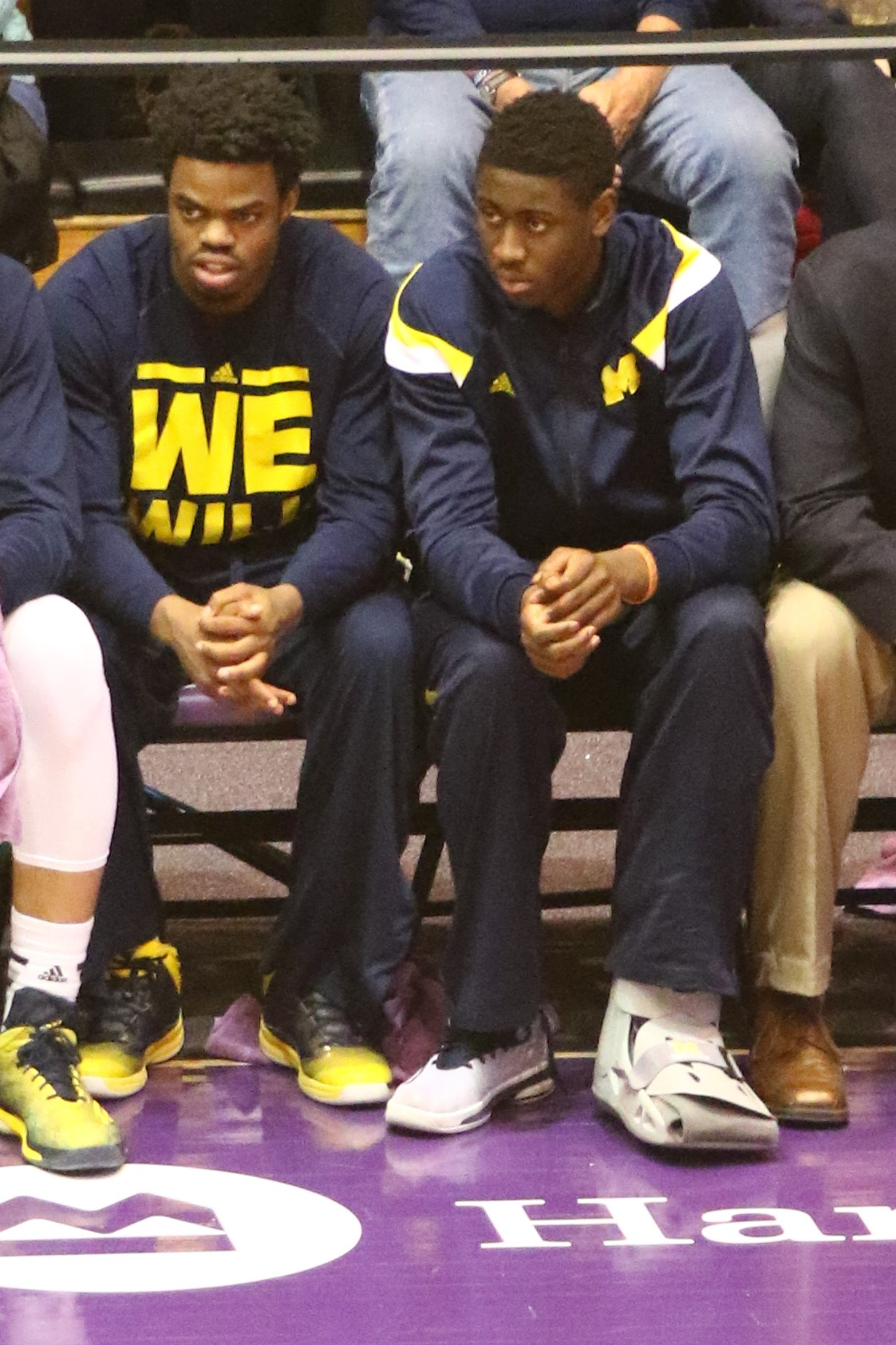
When Derrick Walton and Caris LeVert were sidelined for the season in January 2015, Dakich became part of the rotation.

On December 12 against Delaware State, Dakich posted his Michigan career highs in points (4), assists (3) and rebounds (2). Dakich became an essential member of the 2015–16 Michigan Wolverines playing rotation despite plans to allow him to redshirt to save eligibility for a graduate year season. Spike Albrecht had announced his retirement from basketball and Walton had been previously injured when a team with LeVert and Muhammad-Ali Abdur-Rahkman getting the main guard minutes suffered an injury that was at first undisclosed. For the season he appeared in 24 games, averaging 4.6 minutes and 0.6 points.

For the second semester of the 2016–17 Michigan Wolverines season, Dakich was elevated from walk-on to scholarship athlete via an elaborate prank in which the campus police interrupted a team meeting to escort him under police custody to sign his scholarship paperwork. That season, he began producing The Dak and Dunc Show podcast with teammate Duncan Robinson for WCBN-FM Sports, which was available on iTunes. Dakich, Donnal, Longeran and Robinson were roommates. The team won the 2017 Big Ten Conference men's basketball tournament. Michigan earned a #7-seed and lost to Oregon after reaching the Sweet Sixteen round of the 2017 NCAA tournament.

=== Ohio State ===
On May 5, 2017, Dakich announced that he would use his remaining eligibility to play for the 2017–18 Quinnipiac Bobcats after having graduated the previous weekend. However, Dakich was denied admission to the Quinnipiac journalism graduate program and Chris Holtmann who had been recruiting Dakich to Butler was hired as Ohio State head coach. During the transition from Thad Matta to Holtman, a series of departures left the school with 10 scholarship players. The only point guard on the roster was C. J. Jackson. Dakich transferred to play for the 2017–18 Ohio State Buckeyes despite the intense rivalry between Michigan and Ohio State. It became the third consecutive season that Michigan had had an in-conference transfer (Max Bielfeldt to 2015–16 Indiana Hoosiers and Albrecht to 2016–17 Purdue Boilermakers). Coincidentally at the time, Urban Meyer was head coach of Ohio State football.

Dakich scored 10 points against The Citadel Bulldogs on December 19, 2017. When Ohio State hosted Michigan on December 4, 2017, the team made a 20-point comeback. He contributed 6 assists off the bench against the Iowa Hawkeyes on January 4, 2018. On January 11 against the Maryland Terrapins, Dakich posted his career high 11 points (including 3 three-point shots) during a 22–2 first-half run by Ohio State that erased a hot Maryland start. By mid-February, Ohio State was ranked 8th in the nation and Dakich, who was playing 20 minutes a game during conference play, was considered an integral part of the team's resurgence. When Dakich made his return to Crisler Arena on February 18, 2018, he went 0–3 with a turnover in 22 minutes of play against Michigan on the team's Senior day. It had been 3 years since the 2014–15 Buckeyes had made the 2015 NCAA Division I men's basketball tournament. Aside from Dakich, only seniors Keita Bates-Diop, Jae'Sean Tate and Kam Williams had been to the tournament before. As a #5-seed in the 2018 NCAA Division I men's basketball tournament they advanced to the second round before losing to Gonzaga in the Second Round.

== Administration ==
As a player, Holtman described Dakich as a "scouting report wizard" according to Cleveland.com. Beilein noted his potential as a coach: "I think he sees the game really well,....he's watched a lot of good coaches work." Following the conclusion of his athletic eligibility, Dakich became a student assistant for the 2018–19 Ohio State Buckeyes men's basketball team. The following year, he was hired as a program assistant for the 2019–20 Ohio State Buckeyes men's basketball team. Dakich served as the director of basketball operations for both the 2020–21 and 2021–22 Elon Phoenix men's basketball teams on the staff of former Ohio State assistant Mike Schrage. Then when former Ohio State assistant Ryan Pedon became head coach at Illinois State, he hired Dakich as an assistant coach. During his four seasons at Illinois State, the team matched or bettered the prior season win total every year. In his final season with the team, he served as offensive coordinator. In May 2026, he was hired as an assistant coach for the Miami RedHawks.
