= List of Bowling Green Falcons men's basketball head coaches =

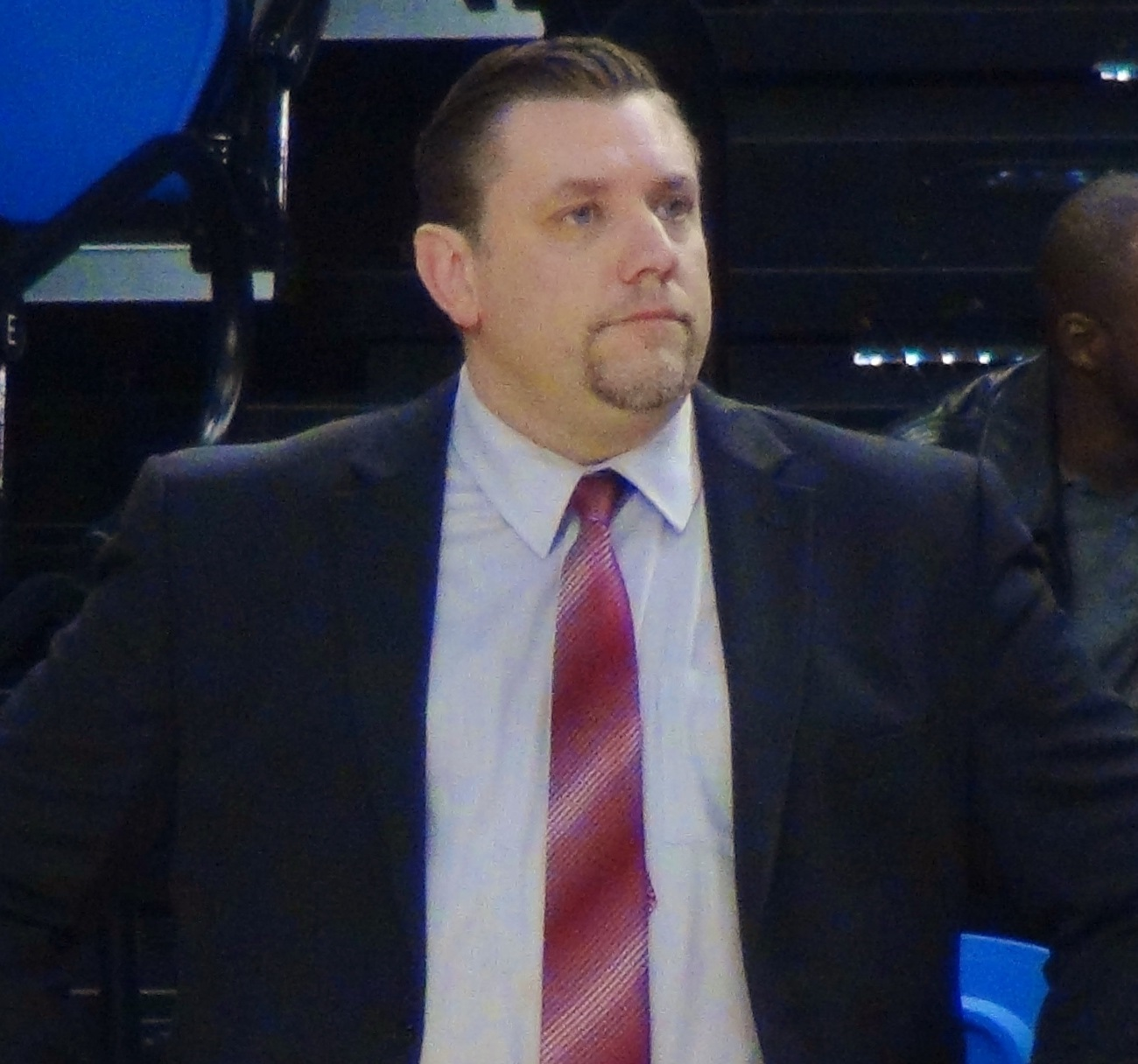
Todd Simon, the current head coach of the Bowling Green Falcons.

The following is a list of Bowling Green Falcons men's basketball head coaches. The Falcons have had 18 coaches in their 107-season history.

Bowling Green's current head coach is Todd Simon. He was hired in March 2023 to replace Michael Huger, who was fired after the 2022–23 seasons.

No.	Tenure	Coach	Years	Record	Pct.
1	1915–1921	Fred Beyerman	6	25–40	.385
2	1921–1922	Earl Krieger	1	4–10	.286
3	1922–1923	Allen Snyder	1	9–4	.692
4	1923–1924	Ray B. McCandless	1	3–15	.167
5	1924–1925	Warren Steller	1	9–5	.643
6	1925–1942	Paul Landis	17	156–133	.540
7	1942–1963 (Note: Anderson took a leave of absence midway through the 1950–51 season. Muellich coached the final 13 games of that season; Anderson returned for the start of the 1951–52 season.)	Harold Anderson	21	362–185	.662
–	1951*	George Muellich	1	5–8	.385
8	1963–1967	Warren Scholler	4	43–52	.453
9	1967–1968	Bill Fitch	1	18–7	.720
10	1968–1971	Bob Conibear	3	31–42	.425
11	1971–1976	Pat Haley	5	62–69	.473
12	1976–1986	John Weinert	10	146–133	.523
13	1986–1997	Jim Larrañaga	11	170–144	.541
14	1997–2007	Dan Dakich	10	156–140	.527
15	2007–2014	Louis Orr	7	101–121	.455
16	2014–2015	Chris Jans	1	21–12	.636
17	2015–2023	Michael Huger	8	126–125	.502
18	2023–present	Todd Simon	0	0–0	–
Totals		18 coaches	107 seasons	1,433–1,233	.538
Records updated through end of 2022–23 season * - Denotes interim head coach. Source
