= College Basketball Invitational =

Third tier postseason collegiate men's basketball tournament

- Current season, competition or edition: 2025 College Basketball Invitational
- College Basketball Invitational
- Sport: Basketball
- Founded: 2007
- Founder: The Gazelle Group
- First season: 2008
- No. of teams: 16
- Country: United States
- Most recent champion: Illinois State (2025)
- Most titles: No team has won more than one title
- Broadcasters: ESPN2 (2022–present); FloCollege (2021-present); ESPNU (2016–2019, 2025–present); CBSSN (2014–2015); AXS TV (2009–2013); Fox College Sports (2008)
- Related competitions: NCAA Division I men's basketball tournament National Invitation Tournament; College Basketball Crown; CollegeInsider.com Postseason Tournament
- Website: https://www.gazellegroup.com/main/cbi/

The College Basketball Invitational (CBI) is an American men's college basketball tournament created in 2007 by The Gazelle Group. The inaugural tournament occurred after the conclusion of the 2007–08 men's college basketball regular season. The CBI selects sixteen teams that are not selected for the NCAA Division I men's basketball tournament or the National Invitation Tournament (NIT).

Originally, it was played with a single-elimination tournament format until the final two teams were determined, and the championship series with a best two-out-of-three format. games were played on home courts. Since the post-COVID pandemic revival in 2021, the tournament has been staged at the Ocean Center in Daytona Beach, Florida, with a single championship final match.

Teams must pay an entry fee of $27,500 to participate. In 2023, the CBI introduced NIL funding of $40,000 to be distributed in the following manner: $25,000 to the champion, $10,000 to the runner-up, and $2,500 to each semifinalist.

While these tournaments provide a chance for teams to continue their season, they are often unpopular among higher-profile teams due to the stigma of playing in a tertiary tournament. In 2014, Indiana Hoosiers athletic director Fred Glass declined a CBI invitation. He expressed, "We're Indiana. We don't play in the CBI." The 2026 tournament was canceled due to circumstances beyond the organizers' control.

== The inaugural CBI ==
The 2008 College Basketball Invitational was the first new postseason tournament since the Collegiate Commissioners Association Tournament in 1974. The opening round was played on March 18, 2008, and March 19, 2008, with the second round being played on March 24, 2008. The semifinals took place on March 26, 2008. The championship was a best-of-three series with games being played on March 31, April 2, and April 4, 2008. The bracketing was done in east, west, south and midwest regions.

Tulsa was crowned the champion in the 2008 tournament.

== Television ==
In the inaugural year, games were available in local markets on DirecTV and Fox Sports Net. The games could also be viewed on the official website. The 2009-2013 tournament broadcasts were changed to HDNet with four first-round games, two quarterfinal games, both semifinal games, and all three championship games being broadcast (HDNet changed its name to AXS prior to the 2013 tournament). CBS Sports Network televised the 2014 and 2015 tournaments. On February 1, 2016, the CBI announced an exclusive television partnership with ESPN to broadcast the Championship Series of the CBI. ESPNU televised the best-of-three Championship Series from 2016 to 2019.

The following is an overview and list of the announcers and television networks to broadcast the tournament.

| Year | Network | Play-by-play | Analyst |
|---|---|---|---|
| 2008 | Fox College Sports | Michael Reghi | Bob Sundvold |
| 2009 | HDNet (Select games in first two rounds, Semifinals, Final) | Rich Cellini | Craig Ehlo |
| 2010 | HDNet (Select games in first two rounds, Semifinals, Final) | Rich Cellini | Craig Ehlo |
| 2011 | HDNet (Select games in first two rounds, Semifinals, Final) | Rich Cellini | Craig Ehlo |
| 2012 | HDNet (Select games in first two rounds, Semifinals, Final) | Rich Cellini | Keno Davis |
| 2013 | AXS TV (Select games in first two rounds, Semifinals, Final) | Kenny Rice | Bobby Cremins |
| 2014 | CBSSN (Final) | Scott Graham | Bob Wenzel |
| 2015 | CBSSN (Final) | Michael Reghi | John Griffin |
| 2016 | ESPNU (Final) | Mitch Holthus | Sean Harrington |
| 2017 | ESPNU (Final) | Roy Philpott | Corey Williams |
| 2018 | ESPNU (Final) | Roy Philpott | Jason Capel |
| 2019 | ESPNU (Final) | Roy Philpott | Tim McCormick |
| 2020 | Tournament not held due to the COVID-19 pandemic | | |
| 2021 | FloSports | Chris Hooker | Kevin Lehman |
| 2022 | FloSports (First Round and Quarterfinals) | Tom James | Jim Christian |
| 2022 | ESPN2 (Semifinals and Final) | Roy Philpott | Joe Lunardi |
| 2023 | FloSports (First Round and Quarterfinals) | Tom James | Jennifer George |
| 2023 | ESPN2 (Semifinals and Final) | Roy Philpott | Joe Lunardi |
| 2024 | FloSports (First Round and Quarterfinals) | Tom James | Jennifer George |
| 2024 | ESPN2 (Semifinals and Final) | Roy Philpott | Mark Wise |
| 2025 | FloSports (First Round and Quarterfinals) | Hector Ledesma | Jennifer George |
| 2025 | ESPNU (Semifinals), ESPN2 (Final) | Roy Philpott | Joe Lunardi |
| 2026 | Tournament not held | | |

== Champions ==
CBI Champions
– 1 championship

| Year | Champion | Runner-up | Most Valuable Player |
|---|---|---|---|
| 2008 | Tulsa | Bradley | Jerome Jordan, Tulsa |
| 2009 | Oregon State | UTEP | Roeland Schaftenaar, Oregon State |
| 2010 | VCU | Saint Louis | Joey Rodriguez, VCU |
| 2011 | Oregon | Creighton | Joevan Catron, Oregon |
| 2012 | Pittsburgh | Washington State | Lamar Patterson, Pittsburgh |
| 2013 | Santa Clara | George Mason | Kevin Foster, Santa Clara |
| 2014 | Siena | Fresno State | Brett Bisping, Siena |
| 2015 | Loyola Chicago | UL Monroe | Earl Peterson, Loyola Chicago |
| 2016 | Nevada | Morehead State | Tyron Criswell, Nevada |
| 2017 | Wyoming | Coastal Carolina | Justin James, Wyoming |
| 2018 | North Texas | San Francisco | Roosevelt Smart, North Texas |
| 2019 | South Florida | DePaul | David Collins, South Florida |
| 2020 | Tournament not held due to the COVID-19 pandemic | | |
| 2021 | Pepperdine | Coastal Carolina | Kessler Edwards, Pepperdine |
| 2022 | UNC Wilmington | Middle Tennessee | Jaylen Sims, UNC Wilmington |
| 2023 | Charlotte | Eastern Kentucky | Brice Williams, Charlotte |
| 2024 | Seattle | High Point | Cameron Tyson, Seattle |
| 2025 | Illinois State | Cleveland State | Chase Walker, Illinois State |
| 2026 | Tournament not held | | |

== See also ==
- Women's Basketball Invitational
