= 2025 College Basketball Invitational =

Single-elimination college basketball tournament

- Season: 2024–25
- Teams: 11 (16 planned)
- Finals site: Ocean Center, Daytona Beach, Florida
- Champions: Illinois State (1st title)
- Runner-up: Cleveland State (1st title game)
- Semifinalists: Florida Gulf Coast (1st Final Four); Incarnate Word (1st Final Four)
- Winning coach: Ryan Pedon (1st title)
- MVP: Chase Walker (Illinois State)
- Attendance: 2,616 (Tournament); 541 (Final)
- Top scorer: Dylan Hayman (Incarnate Word) (62 points)

The 2025 College Basketball Invitational (CBI) was a single-elimination, fully-bracketed men's college basketball postseason tournament featuring eleven National Collegiate Athletic Association (NCAA) Division I teams not selected to participate in the NCAA Division I men's basketball tournament (NCAA), the National Invitation Tournament (NIT), or the College Basketball Crown (CBC).

The 17th edition of the tournament commenced on March 22, and concluded on March 26. All games were played at the Ocean Center in Daytona Beach, Florida, with the first and quarterfinal rounds streamed on FloCollege, the semifinal round telecast on ESPNU and the final telecast on ESPN2.

Illinois State defeated Cleveland State in the final by a score of 79–68 to claim their first NCAA Division I postseason title. The all-tournament team consisted of Ty Pence (Illinois State), Jordan Pyke (Incarnate Word), Jalen Rucker (Army), Tahj Staveskie (Cleveland State) and Chase Walker (Illinois State), with Walker also being named the most valuable player.

== Participating teams ==
=== Accepted bids ===
Team	Conference	Record	Appearance	Last bid
Army	Patriot	16–15 (.516)	2nd	2021
Cleveland State	Horizon	21–12 (.636)	3rd	2024
Elon	Coastal	17–15 (.531)	1st	—
Florida Gulf Coast	Atlantic Sun	18–14 (.563)	1st	—
Illinois State	Missouri Valley	19–14 (.576)	2nd	2014
Incarnate Word	Southland	17–16 (.515)	1st	—
Jacksonville	Atlantic Sun	19–13 (.594)	1st	—
Manhattan	Metro Atlantic	17–13 (.567)	1st	—
Northern Arizona	Big Sky	18–15 (.545)	1st	—
Presbyterian	Big South	14–18 (.438)	2nd	2024
Queens	Atlantic Sun	19–14 (.576)	1st	—

Note: Team records are as of the end of the regular season and prior to the beginning of the tournament.

=== Returned bids ===
Team	Conference	Record	Appearance	Last bid
UC Riverside	Big West	21–12 (.636)	1st	—

The NCAA caused confusion on Selection Sunday, by failing to communicate with at least one program invited to the NIT prior to the initial release of the bracket. Instead, it appears the NCAA assumed that mid-major schools would not decline an NIT bid. UC Riverside had already confirmed their participation in the 2025 College Basketball Invitational, before learning they had been invited to the NIT. For a brief time, NIT and CBI brackets co-existed showing UC Riverside playing in both tournaments. Participation in multiple postseason tournaments is not permitted under NCAA rules. After UC Riverside's commitment to play in the CBI came to the attention of the NCAA, instead of communicating with UC Riverside, they contacted South Alabama, the top remaining at-large team, and extended an NIT invitation to them. As the NCAA was communicating with South Alabama, UC Riverside was in contact with CBI organizers to decline their invitation to that tournament, so they could play in the NIT. After their commitment to the CBI was dissolved, UC Riverside contacted the NCAA and accepted their bid to the NIT. Just an hour after extending the invitation, the NCAA contacted South Alabama and informed them their bid to the NIT had been revoked.

== Field synopsis ==
Rankings, ratings and records were through March 16, 2025 Selection Sunday and prior to any additional post-season activity. This also includes a "KNIT" score, which is leveraged as a criteria and evaluation tool for the National Invitation Tournament selection committee; it is the average of the following seven metrics:

- BTR: Bart Torvik "T-Rank" Ranking
- BPI: ESPN Basketball Power Index
- KPR: Ken Pomeroy College Basketball Ratings (aka "KenPom")
- KPI: Kevin Pauga Index
- NET: NCAA Evaluation Tool
- SOR: Strength Of Record, as calculated by ESPN
- WAB: Wins Above Bubble, as calculated by Bart Torvik

The operators of the CBI have not publicly disclosed the criteria used to select participating teams. It is unknown whether one, some, all or none of the metrics mentioned above were considered in deciding which teams to invite.

KNIT	School	Conference	Conference place	Conference W–L	Division I W–L	Overall W–L	BTR	BPI	KPR	KPI	NET	SOR	WAB	Road W–L	Neutral W–L	Home W–L	Quad 1 W–L	Quad 2 W–L	Quad 3 W–L	Quad 4 W–L	Non D-I W–L
136	Illinois State	Missouri Valley	T–5th	10–10 (.500)	18–14 (.563)	19–14 (.576)	131	124	140	123	121	155	164	5–7 (.417)	2–3 (.400)	12–4 (.750)	0–1 (.000)	1–5 (.167)	7–6 (.538)	10–2 (.833)	1–0 (1.000)
163	Cleveland State	Horizon	T–2nd	14–6 (.700)	18–12 (.600)	21–12 (.636)	173	170	168	150	174	157	154	7–7 (.500)	0–1 (.000)	14–4 (.778)	0–2 (.000)	0–2 (.000)	6–6 (.500)	12–2 (.857)	3–0 (1.000)
175	Jacksonville	Atlantic Sun	T–4th	12–6 (.667)	17–13 (.567)	19–13 (.594)	190	225	179	172	181	167	152	7–9 (.438)	1–1 (.500)	11–3 (.786)	0–3 (.000)	0–4 (.000)	5–2 (.714)	12–4 (.750)	2–0 (1.000)
182	Florida Gulf Coast	Atlantic Sun	3rd	13–5 (.722)	17–14 (.548)	18–14 (.563)	165	178	172	176	173	276	186	7–9 (.438)	0–0 (–)	11–5 (.688)	0–1 (.000)	1–4 (.200)	2–5 (.286)	14–4 (.778)	1–0 (1.000)
185	Queens *	Atlantic Sun	6th	11–7 (.611)	17–14 (.548)	19–14 (.576)	192	231	203	188	199	183	171	9–9 (.500)	1–0 (1.000)	9–5 (.643)	0–3 (.000)	1–2 (.333)	2–5 (.286)	14–4 (.778)	2–0 (1.000)
213	Elon	Coastal	T–9th	8–10 (.444)	15–15 (.500)	17–15 (.531)	228	208	197	208	184	276	219	6–9 (.400)	1–2 (.333)	10–4 (.714)	0–1 (.000)	2–0 (1.000)	4–7 (.364)	9–7 (.563)	2–0 (1.000)
242	Manhattan	Metro Atlantic	T–4th	12–8 (.600)	16–13 (.552)	17–13 (.567)	259	264	236	242	243	276	197	8–7 (.533)	0–1 (.000)	9–5 (.643)	0–1 (.000)	0–1 (.000)	2–1 (.667)	14–10 (.583)	1–0 (1.000)
247	Presbyterian	Big South	T–5th	7–9 (.438)	11–18 (.379)	14–18 (.438)	256	226	231	258	240	276	281	4–12 (.250)	2–1 (.667)	8–5 (.615)	0–0 (–)	0–3 (.000)	5–5 (.500)	6–10 (.375)	3–0 (1.000)
248	Incarnate Word	Southland	T–7th	9–11 (.450)	13–16 (.448)	17–16 (.515)	245	258	248	257	249	276	237	4–10 (.286)	2–1 (.667)	11–5 (.688)	0–2 (.000)	0–1 (.000)	0–6 (.000)	13–7 (.650)	4–0 (1.000)
252	Northern Arizona	Big Sky	T–6th	8–10 (.444)	14–15 (.483)	18–15 (.545)	247	248	247	277	248	276	235	7–8 (.467)	1–2 (.333)	10–5 (.667)	0–0 (–)	0–2 (.000)	1–7 (.125)	13–6 (.684)	4–0 (1.000)
295	Army	Patriot	T–3rd	10–8 (.556)	14–15 (.483)	16–15 (.516)	312	301	324	286	307	276	231	4–11 (.267)	0–0 (–)	12–4 (.750)	0–1 (.000)	0–1 (.000)	0–3 (.000)	14–10 (.583)	2–0 (1.000)
213		Average	5th	10–8 (.556)	15–14 (.517)	18–14 (.563)	218	221	185	212	211	236	202	6–9 (.400)	1–1 (.500)	11–4 (.733)	0–1 (.000)	0–2 (.000)	3–5 (.375)	13–6 (.684)	2–0 (1.000)
* Ineligible for NCAA-sponsored postseason play, including the NCAA tournament and the NIT, due to being within reclassification period for transition from NCAA Division II

== Schedule ==
Game	Time	Matchup	Score	Box score	Attendance	Television
First round – Sunday, March 23
1	12:00 pm	Manhattan vs. Incarnate Word	85–92		832	FloCollege
2	2:00 pm	Elon vs. Army	78–83		832	FloCollege
3	4:30 pm	Queens vs. Northern Arizona	85–78		832	FloCollege
4	6:30 pm	Illinois State vs. Presbyterian	78–70		832	FloCollege
Quarterfinals – Monday, March 24
5	12:00 pm	Jacksonville vs. Incarnate Word	71–87		611	FloCollege
6	2:00 pm	Florida Gulf Coast vs. Army	68–65		611	FloCollege
7	4:00 pm	Cleveland State vs. Queens	88–73		611	FloCollege
Semifinals – Tuesday, March 25
8	7:00 pm	Illinois State vs. Incarnate Word	78–73		632	ESPNU
9	9:00 pm	Florida Gulf Coast vs. Cleveland State	65–72		632	ESPNU
Final – Wednesday, March 26
10	5:00 pm	Illinois State vs. Cleveland State	79–68		541	ESPN2
Game times are Eastern Daylight Time

== Bracket ==
First round March 23; FloCollege
Illinois State	78
Presbyterian	70
Manhattan	85
Incarnate Word	92
Elon	78
Army	83
Queens	85
Northern Arizona	78

Quarterfinals; March 24; FloCollege
Jacksonville	71
Incarnate Word	87
Florida Gulf Coast	68
Army	65
Cleveland State	88
Queens	73

Semifinals; March 25; ESPNU
Illinois State	78
Incarnate Word	73
Florida Gulf Coast	65
Cleveland State	72

Final; March 26; ESPN2
Illinois State	79
Cleveland State	68

== Game summaries ==
=== First round ===
Flo
College

March 23
12:00 p.m. EDT

Box Score

Manhattan 85, Incarnate Word 92
Scoring by half: 43–47, 42–45
Pts: Gilyard, 17; Rebs: Robinson, 9 Asts: Dinkins, 4	Pts: Hayman, 25; Rebs: Pyke, 11; Asts: Anderson, 6
Game 1

Ocean Center
Daytona Beach, FL
Referees: Kitts, Lavigne, Switzer

Flo
College

March 23
2:00 p.m.

Box Score

Elon 78, Army 83
Scoring by half: 39–30, 39–53
Pts: Sherry, 23; Rebs: Sherry, 14; Asts: O'Neil, 4	Pts: Rucker, 27; Rebs: Laczkowski, 9 Asts: Rucker, 6
Game 2

Ocean Center
Daytona Beach, FL
Referees: Googas, Shaw, Zink

Flo
College

March 23
4:30 p.m.

Box Score

Queens 85, Northern Arizona 78
Scoring by half: 45–41, 40–37
Pts: Ashby, 22; Rebs: Colimerio, 8 Asts: Cash, 6	Pts: Jackson, 23; Rebs: Towt, 13; Asts: Tied (2), 4
Game 3

Ocean Center
Daytona Beach, FL
Referees: Basile, Evans, Flowers

Flo
College

March 23
6:30 p.m.

Box Score

Illinois State 78, Presbyterian 70
Scoring by half: 33–30, 45–40
Pts: Walker, 20; Rebs: Walker, 9 Asts: Banks, 5	Pts: Mincy, 21; Rebs: Stewart, 8 Asts: Peterson, 2
Game 4

Ocean Center
Daytona Beach, FL
Attendance: 832
Referees: Bradwell, Nadone, Powell

=== Quarterfinal round ===
Flo
College

March 24
12:00 p.m. EDT

Box Score

Jacksonville 71, Incarnate Word 87
Scoring by half: 32–40, 39–47
Pts: Munson, 19; Rebs: Munson, 8 Asts: Spence, 10	Pts: Bailey, 23; Rebs: Pyke, 6 Asts: Anderson, 5
Game 1

Ocean Center
Daytona Beach, FL
Referees: Basile, Flowers, Googas

Flo
College

March 24
2:00 p.m.

Box Score

Florida Gulf Coast 68, Army 65
Scoring by half: 38–31, 30–34
Pts: Tied (2), 16; Rebs: Muniz, 9 Asts: Tied (2), 4	Pts: Rucker, 25; Rebs: Tied (2), 5 Asts: Curry, 5
Game 2

Ocean Center
Daytona Beach, FL
Referees: Evans, Nardone, Powell

Flo
College

March 24
4:00 p.m.

Box Score

Cleveland State 88, Queens 73
Scoring by half: 40–23, 48–50
Pts: Staveskie, 29; Rebs: Arnett, 6 Asts: Staveskie, 4	Pts: Shine, 12; Rebs: Wilson, 4 Asts: Colimerio, 5
Game 3

Ocean Center
Daytona Beach, FL
Attendance: 611
Referees: Kitts, Lavigne, Shaw

=== Semifinal round ===
ESPNU

March 25
7:00 p.m. EDT

Box Score

Illinois State 78, Incarnate Word 73
Scoring by half: 31–34, 47–39
Pts: Walker, 27; Rebs: Pence, 10; Asts: Banks, 5	Pts: Hayman, 24; Rebs: Tied (2), 9 Asts: Anderson, 3
Game 1

Ocean Center
Daytona Beach, FL
Referees: Evans, Nardone, Switzer

ESPNU

March 25
9:00 p.m.

Box Score

Florida Gulf Coast 65, Cleveland State 72
Scoring by half: 29–36, 36–36
Pts: Muniz, 16; Rebs: Guillouette, 9 Asts: Muniz, 4	Pts: Stevenson, 17; Rebs: Tied (3), 6 Asts: Tied (3), 2
Game 2

Ocean Center
Daytona Beach, FL
Attendance: 632
Referees: Flowers, Lavigne, Shaw

=== Final round ===
ESPN2

March 26
5:00 p.m. EDT

Box Score

Illinois State 79, Cleveland State 68
Scoring by half: 40–31, 39–37
Pts: Boser, 20; Rebs: Kinziger, 7 Asts: Banks, 5	Pts: Smith, 16; Rebs: Tied (2), 5 Asts: Tied (2), 2
Championship

Ocean Center
Daytona Beach, FL
Attendance: 541
Referees: Bradwell, Kitts, Zink

== See also ==
- 2025 NCAA Division I men's basketball tournament
- 2025 National Invitation Tournament
- 2025 College Basketball Crown
