= List of Indiana Hoosiers men's basketball head coaches =

The following is a list of Indiana Hoosiers men's basketball head coaches. The Hoosiers have had 31 coaches in their 120-season history.

== Coaching history ==
Coach	Years	Win–loss	Win %	Conference titles	NCAA Tourn. appearances	NCAA Titles
James H. Horne	1901	1–4	.200	0	–	–
Phelps Darby	1902	4–4	.500	0	–	–
Willis Coval	1903–1904	13–8	.619	0	–	–
Zora Clevenger	1905–1906	12–21	.364	0	–	–
James M. Sheldon	1907	9–5	.643	0	–	–
Ed Cook	1908	9–6	.600	0	–	–
Robert Harris	1909	5–9	.357	0	–	–
John Georgen	1910	5–8	.385	0	–	–
Oscar Rackle	1911	11–5	.688	0	–	–
James Kase	1912	6–11	.353	0	–	–
Arthur Powell	1913	5–11	.312	0	–	–
Arthur Berndt	1914–1915	6–21	.222	0	–	–
Allan Williford	1916	6–7	.462	0	–	–
Guy Lowman	1917	13–6	.684	0	–	–
Dana Evans	1918–1919	20–11	.645	0	–	–
Ewald O. Stiehm	1920	13–8	.619	0	–	–
George Levis	1921–1922	25–16	.610	0	–	–
Leslie Mann	1922–1924	19–13	.594	0	–	–
Everett Dean	1924–1938	162–93	.635	3	–	–
Branch McCracken	1938–1943, 1946–1965	364–174	.677	4	4	2
Harry C. Good	1943–1946	35–29	.547	0	0	0
Lou Watson	1965–1971	65–60	.520	1	1	0
Jerry Oliver	1969–1970, 1971	4–17	.190	0	0	0
Bob Knight	1971–2000	662–239	.735	11	24	3
Mike Davis	2000–2006	115–79	.592	1	4	0
Kelvin Sampson	2006–2008	43–15	.741	0	1	0
Dan Dakich	2008	3–4	.429	0	1	0
Tom Crean	2008–2017	166–135	.552	2	4	0
Archie Miller	2017–2021	67–58	.536	0	0	0
Mike Woodson	2021–2025	63–40	.612	0	2	0
Darian DeVries	2025–present	23–14	.622	0	0	0
