= Cornelius Cash =

American basketball player (1952–2026)

Personal information
- Born: March 3, 1952 Macon, Mississippi, U.S.
- Died: August 31, 2026 (aged 74) Kettering, Ohio, U.S.
- Listed height: 6 ft 8 in (2.03 m)
- Listed weight: 215 lb (98 kg)

Career information
- High school: Dunbar (Dayton, Ohio)
- College: Bowling Green (1972–1975)
- NBA draft: 1975: 2nd round, 24th overall pick
- Drafted by: Milwaukee Bucks
- Position: Power forward
- Number: 45

Career history
- 1976: Detroit Pistons

Career highlights
- 3× First-team All-MAC (1973–1975)
- Stats at NBA.com
- Stats at Basketball Reference

Cornelius Cash Jr. (March 3, 1952 – August 31, 2026) was an American basketball player. He was a 6'8" and 215 lbs. power forward.

== Collegiate career ==
Cash was a three-time All-Mid-American Conference First Team forward for the Bowling Green Falcons. As a college player, Cash averaged 15.8 ppg and 13.5 rpg. Over 79 games, he scored 1,245 points and grabbed 1,068 rebounds, the later of which ranks second all-time in school history behind only Naismith Basketball Hall of Famer Nate Thurmond. Cash's 93 career blocked shots for the Falcons rank ninth all-time for the school.

He was inducted into the Bowling Green Athletics Hall of Fame in 2009.

== Pro career ==
Cash was selected by the Milwaukee Bucks in the second round (24th pick overall) of the 1975 NBA draft and by the San Diego Sails in the second round of the 1975 ABA draft. He was cut by the Bucks before the season.

He played for the Detroit Pistons (1976–77) in the NBA for six games and then played abroad in Belgium, Yugoslavia, and Brazil.

== Personal life and death ==
After retiring from basketball, Cash worked for the Howard Paper Company and then for Houser Asphalt & Concrete.

Cash died on August 31, 2026, at the age of 74.

== Career statistics ==
Legend
GP	Games played	GS	Games started	MPG	Minutes per game
FG%	Field goal percentage	3P%	3-point field goal percentage	FT%	Free throw percentage
RPG	Rebounds per game	APG	Assists per game	SPG	Steals per game
BPG	Blocks per game	PPG	Points per game	**Bold**	Career high

=== NBA ===
==== Regular season ====
Year	Team	GP	MPG	FG%	FT%	RPG	APG	SPG	BPG	PPG
1976–77	Detroit	6	8.2	.391	.500	2.7	.2	.3	.2	3.5
