= 2024–25 Illinois State Redbirds men's basketball team =

American college basketball season

2024–25 Illinois State Redbirds men's basketball

CBI Champion
- Conference: Missouri Valley Conference
- Record: 22–14 (10–10 MVC)
- Head coach: Ryan Pedon (3rd season)
- Associate head coach: Jason Slay
- Assistant coaches: Rob Judson; Andrew Dakich
- Home arena: Doug Collins Court at CEFCU Arena

2024–25 Missouri Valley Conference men's basketball standings
	Conf.				Overall
Team	W		L	PCT	W		L	PCT
Drake †	17	–	3	.850	31	–	4	.886
Bradley	15	–	5	.750	28	–	9	.757
Northern Iowa	14	–	6	.700	20	–	13	.606
Belmont	13	–	7	.650	22	–	11	.667
Illinois State	10	–	10	.500	22	–	14	.611
UIC	10	–	10	.500	17	–	14	.548
Murray State	9	–	11	.450	16	–	17	.485
Southern Illinois	8	–	12	.400	14	–	19	.424
Indiana State	8	–	12	.400	14	–	18	.438
Evansville	8	–	12	.400	11	–	21	.344
Valparaiso	6	–	14	.300	15	–	19	.441
Missouri State	2	–	18	.100	9	–	23	.281
† 2025 MVC tournament winner

The 2024–25 Illinois State Redbirds men's basketball team represented Illinois State University during the 2024–25 NCAA Division I men's basketball season. The Redbirds played their home games on Doug Collins Court at CEFCU Arena in Normal, Illinois as members of the Missouri Valley Conference (MVC).

== Previous season ==
The Redbirds finished the 2023–24 season 15–17, 9–11 in the Missouri Valley Conference play to finish in a tie for seventh place. As the seventh seed in the MVC tournament, they lost to tenth seeded Evansville in the opening round.

== Offseason ==
=== Departures ===
Name	#	Pos.	Height	Weight	Year	Hometown	Reason for departure
Kendall Lewis	22	F	6'8"	210	Fifth Year	Snellville, GA	Graduated (undrafted; signed with Bristol Flyers)
Ryan Schmitt	50	F	6'11"	220	Fifth Year	Van Meter, IA	Graduated (Illinois Wesleyan Graduate Assistant)
Harouna Sissoko	23	F	6'7"	217	Redshirt Senior	Kayes, Mali	Transferred to Arkansas-Monticello
Darius Burford	10	G	6'0"	175	Senior	Bolingbrook, IL	Transferred to Texas-Arlington
Myles Foster	4	F	6'7"	235	Senior	Brooklyn, NY	Transferred to Clemson
Luke Kasubke	0	G	6'5"	190	Senior	St. Louis, MO	Transferred to North Dakota State
Nik Stadelman	14	G	6'0"	180	Senior	Rockford, IL	Graduated (Radford Graduate Assistant)

=== 2024 recruiting class ===
College recruiting information
Name	Hometown	School	Height	Weight	Commit date
Jack Daugherty; F	Brookfield, WI	Brookfield Central HS	6 ft 8 in (2.03 m)	205 lb (93 kg)	Sep 12, 2023
Jack Daugherty; F	Recruit ratings: Scout: Rivals: 247Sports: (NR)				
Nick Feather; F	Heyworth, IL	Heyworth Jr/Sr School	6 ft 8 in (2.03 m)	280 lb (130 kg)	May 10, 2024
Nick Feather; F	Recruit ratings: Scout: Rivals: 247Sports: (NR)				
Cade Norris; G	Hilliard, OH	Hilliard Bradley HS	6 ft 4 in (1.93 m)	205 lb (93 kg)	Sep 4, 2023
Cade Norris; G	Recruit ratings: Scout: Rivals: 247Sports: (NR)				
Overall recruit ranking:
Note: In many cases, Scout, Rivals, 247Sports, On3, and ESPN may conflict in their listings of height and weight.; In these cases, the average was taken. ESPN grades are on a 100-point scale.; Sources: "2024 Team Ranking". Rivals.

=== Incoming transfers ===
Name	Pos.	Height	Weight	Year	Hometown	Prior school
Boden Skunberg	G	6'5"	205	Graduate	Jamestown, ND	North Dakota State
Caden Boser	F	6'8"	225	Fifth Year	Eau Claire, WI	Valdosta State
Landon Wolf	G	6'5"	205	Redshirt Junior	Cedar Falls, IA	Northern Iowa
Cameron Barnes	F	6'10"	205	Redshirt Freshman	Duncanville, TX	Mississippi

== Preseason ==
The Redbirds were picked to finish in fourth place in the conference's preseason poll.

== Roster ==
2024–25 Illinois State Redbirds men's basketball team
Players
Coaches

Pos.	#	Name	Height	Weight	Year	Previous school	Hometown
F	0	Jack Daugherty	6 ft 8 in (2.03 m)	205 lb (93 kg)	Fr	Brookfield Central HS	Brookfield, WI
G	1	Malachi Poindexter	6 ft 3 in (1.91 m)	190 lb (86 kg)	GS	Louisa County HS; St. Anne's-Belfield School; Virginia	Mineral, VA
G	2	Cade Norris	6 ft 4 in (1.93 m)	205 lb (93 kg)	Fr	Hilliard Bradley HS	Hilliard, OH
G	3	Dalton Banks	6 ft 2 in (1.88 m)	190 lb (86 kg)	GS	North HS; Southern Illinois	Eau Claire, WI
G	4	Landon Wolf	6 ft 5 in (1.96 m)	205 lb (93 kg)	RS Jr	Cedar Falls HS; Northern Iowa	Cedar Falls, IA
G	5	Jordan Davis (5Y)	6 ft 4 in (1.93 m)	205 lb (93 kg)	Sr	La Crosse Central HS; Wisconsin	La Crosse, WI
G	11	Johnny Kinziger	5 ft 11 in (1.8 m)	170 lb (77 kg)	So	De Pere HS	De Pere, WI
F	12	Brandon Lieb (injured) (redshirt)	7 ft 1 in (2.16 m)	250 lb (113 kg)	GS	Deerfield HS; Illinois	Deerfield, IL
G	13	Ty Blake (W)	6 ft 4 in (1.93 m)	190 lb (86 kg)	So	University HS	Normal, IL
G	14	Boden Skunberg (injured) (redshirt)	6 ft 5 in (1.96 m)	205 lb (93 kg)	GS	Jamestown HS; North Dakota State	Jamestown, ND
G	22	Ty Pence	6 ft 6 in (1.98 m)	205 lb (93 kg)	So	St. Joseph-Ogden HS	St. Joseph, IL
F	23	Cameron Barnes	6 ft 10 in (2.08 m)	205 lb (93 kg)	RS Fr	Duncanville HS; Mississippi	Duncanville, TX
F	31	Nick Feather (W) (redshirt)	6 ft 8 in (2.03 m)	280 lb (127 kg)	Fr	Heyworth Jr/Sr School	Heyworth, IL
F	33	Caden Boser (5Y)	6 ft 8 in (2.03 m)	225 lb (102 kg)	Sr	Memorial HS; Missouri-Kansas City; Valdosta State	Eau Claire, WI
F	35	Chase Walker	6 ft 9 in (2.06 m)	270 lb (122 kg)	So	Saint Charles Preparatory School	Columbus, OH

Head coach

- Ryan Pedon (Wooster)

Assistant coach(es)

- Jason Slay (West Virginia State)
- Rob Judson (Illinois)
- Andrew Dakich (Michigan)

Legend

- (C) Team captain
- (S) Suspended
- (I) Ineligible
- (W) Walk-on
- (5Y) Fifth-year Senior
- Injured
- Current redshirt

Roster
Last update: November 3, 2024

== Schedule and results ==
Date time, TV	Rank^{#}	Opponent^{#}	Result	Record	High points	High rebounds	High assists	Site (attendance) city, state
Exhibition Season
October 26, 2024*; 2:00 pm		Lewis	W 72–65		18 – Wolf	7 – Banks	4 – Tied	CEFCU Arena; Normal, IL
Regular Season
November 4, 2024*; 7:00 pm, ESPN+		Tennessee–Martin	L 65–67	0–1	15 – Daugherty	7 – Tied	6 – Banks	CEFCU Arena (3,854); Normal, IL
November 7, 2024*; 7:30 pm, MidCo Sports Plus		at North Dakota State	W 77–68	1–1	20 – Kinziger	10 – Walker	4 – Banks	Scheels Center (1,353); Fargo, ND
November 12, 2024*; 7:00 pm, ESPN+		Ohio	W 85–75	2–1	23 – Banks	5 – Tied	7 – Kinziger	CEFCU Arena (3,923); Normal, IL
November 17, 2024*; 4:30 pm, ESPN+		Trinity Christian	W 107–52	3–1	28 – Daugherty	6 – Tied	5 – Banks	CEFCU Arena (3,974); Normal, IL
November 22, 2024*; 2:00 pm, ESPN+		vs. McNeese; Paradise Jam Quarterfinal	L 68–76	3–2	14 – Pence	6 – Pence	4 – Banks	Sports and Fitness Center (1,525); Charlotte Amalie, USVI
November 23, 2024*; 2:00 pm, ESPN+		vs. UAB; Paradise Jam Consolation Semifinal	W 84–83	4–2	21 – Kinziger	8 – Walker	5 – Banks	Sports and Fitness Center (1,886); Charlotte Amalie, USVI
November 25, 2024*; 2:00 pm, ESPN+		vs. George Washington; Paradise Jam Fourth Place	L 64–72	4–3	18 – Walker	8 – Pence	1 – Tied	Sports and Fitness Center (1,986); Charlotte Amalie, USVI
December 4, 2024; 6:00 pm, MVC TV Network/ESPN+		at Belmont	L 97–99 ^{OT}	4–4 (0–1)	17 – Boser	7 – Pence	9 – Banks	Curb Event Center (1,301); Nashville, TN
December 7, 2024*; 6:00 pm, Marquee/ESPN+		Pacific	W 72–61	5–4	22 – Walker	11 – Walker	4 – Tied	CEFCU Arena (3,595); Normal, IL
December 15, 2024*; 4:00 pm, Marquee/ESPN+		Saint Louis	W 81–77	6–4	27 – Walker	8 – Walker	4 – Banks	CEFCU Arena (4,188); Normal, IL
December 18, 2024*; 7:00 pm, ESPN+		Northern Illinois	W 81–60	7–4	17 – Banks	8 – Banks	6 – Kinziger	CEFCU Arena (2,927); Normal, IL
December 22, 2024*; 11:00 am, ESPN+		at Cornell	W 80–77	8–4	16 – Daugherty	7 – Walker	5 – Kinziger	Newman Arena (568); Ithaca, NY
December 29, 2024; 4:00 pm, Marquee/ESPN+		UIC	L 67–73	8–5 (0–2)	20 – Poindexter	5 – Davis	5 – Banks	CEFCU Arena (3,841); Normal, IL
January 2, 2025; 7:00 pm, ESPN+		at Murray State	W 74–68	9–5 (1–2)	17 – Tied	8 – Pence	4 – Kinziger	CFSB Center (4,585); Murray, KY
January 5, 2025; 3:00 pm, ESPN+		Southern Illinois	W 85–54	10–5 (2–2)	17 – Tied	10 – Davis	5 – Poindexter	CEFCU Arena (3,427); Normal, IL
January 8, 2025; 7:00 pm, ESPN+		at Evansville	L 51–69	10–6 (2–3)	14 – Poindexter	7 – Davis	2 – Tied	Ford Center (4,036); Evansville, IN
January 11, 2025; 6:00 pm, ESPN+		Northern Iowa	L 84–85	10–7 (2–4)	27 – Walker	9 – Walker	4 – Kingziger	CEFCU Arena (4,712); Normal, IL
January 15, 2025; 8:00 pm, MVC TV Network/ESPN+		at Drake	L 62–66	10–8 (2–5)	20 – Walker	4 – Walker	2 – Tied	The Knapp Center (3,117); Des Moines, IA
January 18, 2025; 4:00 pm, ESPN+		Missouri State	W 74–68	11–8 (3–5)	19 – Kinziger	11 – Wolf	5 – Banks	CEFCU Arena (4,588); Normal, IL
January 21, 2025; 7:00 pm, Marquee/ESPN+		Indiana State	W 85–81	12–8 (4–5)	21 – Banks	12 – Davis	6 – Kinziger	CEFCU Arena (3,617); Normal, IL
January 25, 2025; 1:00 pm, CBSSN		at Bradley; I–74 Rivalry	L 57–61	12–9 (4–6)	16 – Kinziger	7 – Walker	5 – Kinziger	Carver Arena (9,646); Peoria, IL
January 29, 2025; 8:00 pm, MVC TV Network/ESPN+		Belmont	W 81–78	13–9 (5–6)	22 – Tied	6 – Walker	6 – Banks	CEFCU Arena (3,477); Normal, IL
February 1, 2025; 4:00 pm, ESPN+		Valparaiso	W 86–78	14–9 (6–6)	24 – Walker	5 – Tied	7 – Walker	CEFCU Arena (5,706); Normal, IL
February 5, 2025; 7:00 pm, ESPN+		at UIC	W 81–79	15–9 (7–6)	31 – Walker	9 – Walker	4 – Tied	Credit Union 1 Arena (1,554); Chicago, IL
February 8, 2025; 5:00 pm, ESPNU		at Northern Iowa	L 65–68	15–10 (7–7)	16 – Kinziger	9 – Kinziger	4 – Banks	McLeod Center (4,809); Cedar Falls, IA
February 12, 2025; 8:00 pm, MVC TV Network/ESPN+		Drake	L 77–84	15–11 (7–8)	25 – Walker	7 – Walker	3 – Poindexter	CEFCU Arena (4,122); Normal, IL
February 15, 2025; 12:00 pm, ESPN+		at Indiana State	L 76–85	15–12 (7–9)	22 – Walker	11 – Walker	4 – Walker	Hulman Center (5,198); Terre Haute, IN
February 19, 2025; 7:00 pm, CBSSN		Bradley; I–74 Rivalry	W 82–71	16–12 (8–9)	25 – Daugherty	9 – Kinziger	4 – Poindexter	CEFCU Arena (5,719); Normal, IL
February 22, 2025; 7:00 pm, ESPN+		at Missouri State	W 70–68	17–12 (9–9)	16 – Banks	7 – Davis	8 – Banks	Great Southern Bank Arena (1,853); Springfield, MO
February 25, 2025; 7:00 pm, ESPN+		at Southern Illinois	L 79–88	17–13 (9–10)	18 – Banks	7 – Walker	7 – Walker	Banterra Center (4,141); Carbondale, IL
March 2, 2025; 2:00 pm, ESPN+		Evansville	W 62–53	18–13 (10–10)	13 – Banks	9 – Pence	3 – Davis	CEFCU Arena (5,072); Normal, IL
Conference Tournament
March 6, 2025*; 2:30 pm, MVC TV Network/ESPN+	(5)	vs. (12) Missouri State; Arch Madness [Opening Round]	W 70–54	19–13	13 – Kinziger	9 – Walker	8 – Banks	Enterprise Center (4,402); St. Louis, MO
March 7, 2025*; 2:30 pm, MVC TV Network/ESPN+	(5)	vs. (4) Belmont; Arch Madness [Quarterfinal]	L 63–76	19–14	19 – Banks	6 – Tied	7 – Banks	Enterprise Center (6,005); St. Louis, MO
College Basketball Invitational, Presented By Purple
March 23, 2025*; 5:30 pm, FloCollege		vs. Presbyterian [First Round]	W 78–70	20–14	20 – Walker	9 – Walker	5 – Banks	Ocean Center (832); Daytona Beach, FL
March 25, 2025*; 6:00 pm, ESPNU		vs. Incarnate Word [Semifinal]	W 78–73	21–14	27 – Walker	10 – Pence	5 – Banks	Ocean Center (632); Daytona Beach, FL
March 26, 2025*; 4:00 pm, ESPN2		vs. Cleveland State [Final]	W 79–68	22–14	20 – Boser	7 – Kinziger	5 – Banks	Ocean Center (541); Daytona Beach, FL
*Non-conference game. ^{#}Rankings from AP Poll. (#) Tournament seedings in parentheses. All times are in Central Time Zone.
