= Jimmy Darrow =

American basketball player

Personal information
- Born: September 25, 1937 Akron, Ohio, U.S.
- Died: June 8, 1987 (aged 49) Akron, Ohio, U.S.
- Listed height: 5 ft 10 in (1.78 m)
- Listed weight: 170 lb (77 kg)

Career information
- High school: South (Akron, Ohio)
- College: Bowling Green (1957–1960)
- NBA draft: 1960: 5th round, 38th overall pick
- Drafted by: St. Louis Hawks
- Position: Guard

Career history
- 1960–1961: Akron Goodyears
- 1961: St. Louis Hawks

Career highlights
- Second-team All-American – UPI (1960); Third-team All-American – NABC (1960); 3× First-team All-MAC (1958–1960)
- Stats at NBA.com
- Stats at Basketball Reference

James K. Darrow (September 25, 1937 – June 8, 1987) was an American basketball player. He was born in Akron, Ohio. A 5-foot-10-inch (178 cm), 170 pounds (77 kg) guard, Darrow starred at Bowling Green State University. He was drafted by the St. Louis Hawks of the National Basketball Association and played five games with them during the 1961–62 NBA season, scoring twelve points. He previously played for the Akron Goodyears in the National Industrial Basketball League.

Darrow was inducted into the Ohio Basketball Hall of Fame in 2018.

== Career statistics ==
Legend
GP	Games played	GS	Games started	MPG	Minutes per game
FG%	Field goal percentage	3P%	3-point field goal percentage	FT%	Free throw percentage
RPG	Rebounds per game	APG	Assists per game	SPG	Steals per game
BPG	Blocks per game	PPG	Points per game	**Bold**	Career high

=== NBA ===
==== Regular season ====
Year	Team	GP	MPG	FG%	FT%	RPG	APG	PPG
1961–62	St. Louis	5	6.8	.200	.857	1.4	1.2	2.4
