= Ryan Pedon =

American basketball coach

Current position
- Title: Head coach
- Team: Illinois State
- Conference: Missouri Valley
- Record: 71–65 (.522)

Biographical details
- Born: May 3, 1978 (age 48)

Playing career
- 1996–2000: Wooster

Coaching career (HC unless noted)
- 2000–2002: Miami (OH) (GA)
- 2005–2010: Miami (OH) (assistant)
- 2010–2013: Toledo (assistant)
- 2013–2015: Illinois (assistant)
- 2015–2017: Butler (assistant)
- 2017–2022: Ohio State (assistant)
- 2022–present: Illinois State

Administrative career (AD unless noted)
- 2002–2005: Kent State (DBO)

Head coaching record
- Overall: 71–65 (.522)
- Tournaments: 3–1 (.750) (NIT); 3–0 (1.000) (CBI)

Accomplishments and honors

Championships
- CBI (2025)

Ryan Thomas Pedon (born May 3, 1978) is an American basketball coach and former player. He is currently the head coach at Illinois State. He is known for his Ohio roots and strong recruiting. He has been a coach under notable names like John Groce and Chris Holtmann.

== Playing career ==
Pedon played college basketball for Wooster under head coach Steve Moore. He won the Bear Award in 2000 for a player who exhibits leadership, courage and character to the team.

He graduated in 2000 from Wooster with a degree in communications. In 2002, he earned his master's degree from Miami (OH) in sports organization.

== Coaching career ==
Known for his strong Ohio roots, Pedon started his coaching career at Miami (OH) as a graduate assistant. He became the director of basketball operations for Kent State before returning to Miami (OH) in 2005. He left in 2010 to be an assistant coach under former Marquette assistant coach Tod Kowalczyk.

In 2013, he was hired as the assistant to the head coach by Illinois. He worked under John Groce during this time, a friend of future boss Chris Holtmann. He became known as a good recruiter in the state of Ohio and an offensive-minded coach. In 2015, he joined Chris Holtmann at Butler. He left with Holtmann to join his hometown team, Ohio State, in 2017. On March 4, 2022 he was announced as the Illinois State men's basketball coach.

== Head coaching record ==
Record table
Season	Team	Overall	Conference	Standing	Postseason
Illinois State Redbirds (Missouri Valley Conference) (2022–present)
2022–23	Illinois State	11–21	6–14	9th	
2023–24	Illinois State	15–17	9–11	T–7th	
2024–25	Illinois State	22–14	10–10	T–5th	CBI Champion
2025–26	Illinois State	23–13	12–8	T–3rd	NIT Semifinal
2026–27	Illinois State	0–0	0–0		
Illinois State:		71–65 (.522)	37–43 (.463)		
Total:		71–65 (.522)	37–43 (.463)		
National champion Postseason invitational champion Conference regular season champion Conference regular season and conference tournament champion Division regular season champion Division regular season and conference tournament champion Conference tournament champion
