= Bowling Green Falcons men's basketball =

NCAA Division 1 program

2026–27 Bowling Green Falcons men's basketball team
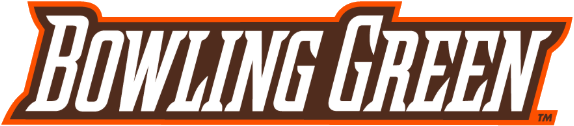
- University: Bowling Green State University
- Head coach: Todd Simon (4th season)
- Location: Bowling Green, Ohio
- Arena: Stroh Center (capacity: 4,700)
- Conference: Mid-American
- Nickname: Falcons
- Colors: Brown and orange

NCAA Division I tournament Sweet Sixteen
- 1963

NCAA Division I tournament appearances
- 1959, 1962, 1963, 1968

Conference regular-season champions
- 1959, 1962, 1963, 1968, 1981, 1983, 1997, 2000, 2009

Conference division champions
- 2000, 2009

Uniforms
Home	Away

The Bowling Green Falcons men's basketball team is the basketball team that represents Bowling Green State University in Bowling Green, Ohio. The school's team currently competes in the Mid-American Conference. The team last played in the NCAA Division I men's basketball tournament in 1968. Former head coach Michael Huger was fired after the 2022–23 season, and Todd Simon was hired to replace him on March 15, 2023.

== Coaching history ==
Coach	Career	Record	Conference Record
F. G. Beyerman	1915–1921	25–40 (.385)	n/a
Earl Krieger	1921–1922	4–10 (.286)	n/a
Allen Snyder	1922–1923	9–4 (.692)	n/a
Ray B. McCandless	1923–1924	3–15 (.167)	n/a
Warren Steller	1924–1925	9–5 (.643)	
Paul Landis	1925–1942	156–133 (.540)	56–57 (.496)
Harold Anderson	1942–1963	367–193 (.655)	68–55 (.553)
Warren Scholler	1963–1967	43–52 (.453)	24–24 (.500)
Bill Fitch	1967–1968	18–17 (.514)	10–2 (.833)
Bob Conibear	1968–1971	31–42 (.425)	12–20 (.375)
Pat Haley	1971–1976	62–69 (.473)	32–32 (.500)
John Weinert	1976–1986	146–133 (.523)	89–79 (.530)
Jim Larranaga	1986–1997	170–144 (.541)	101–85 (.543)
Dan Dakich	1997–2007	156–140 (.527)	89–89 (.500)
Louis Orr	2007–2014	101–121 (.455)	54–60 (.474)
Chris Jans	2014–2015	21–12 (.636)	11–7 (.611)
Michael Huger	2015–2023	126–125 (.502)	64–82 (.438)
Todd Simon	2023–present	20–14 (.588)	10–8 (.556)
Totals	1915–present	1,466–1,259 (.538)	620–600 (.508)

- Bowling Green was a member of the Northwest Ohio Intercollegiate Athletic Association from at least 1927–28 through at least 1930–31. Information about their conference record is unavailable.
- Bowling Green was a member of the Ohio Athletic Conference from the 1933–34 through 1941–42 seasons, but never won an OAC title.
- Harold Anderson took a leave of absence midway through the 1950–51 season. George Muellich coached the final 13 games of that season in place of Anderson and went 5–8

(.385); Anderson returned for the start of the 1951–52 season.

- Bowling Green joined the Mid-American Conference beginning with the 1953–54 season.
- The Mid-American Conference did not hold a conference tournament until the 1979–80 season.

== Postseason ==
=== NCAA tournament results ===
The Falcons have appeared in four NCAA Tournaments. Their combined record is 1–5. Their drought of 55 years (as of 2026) is tied for the third longest active and fourth longest all time between tournament appearances.

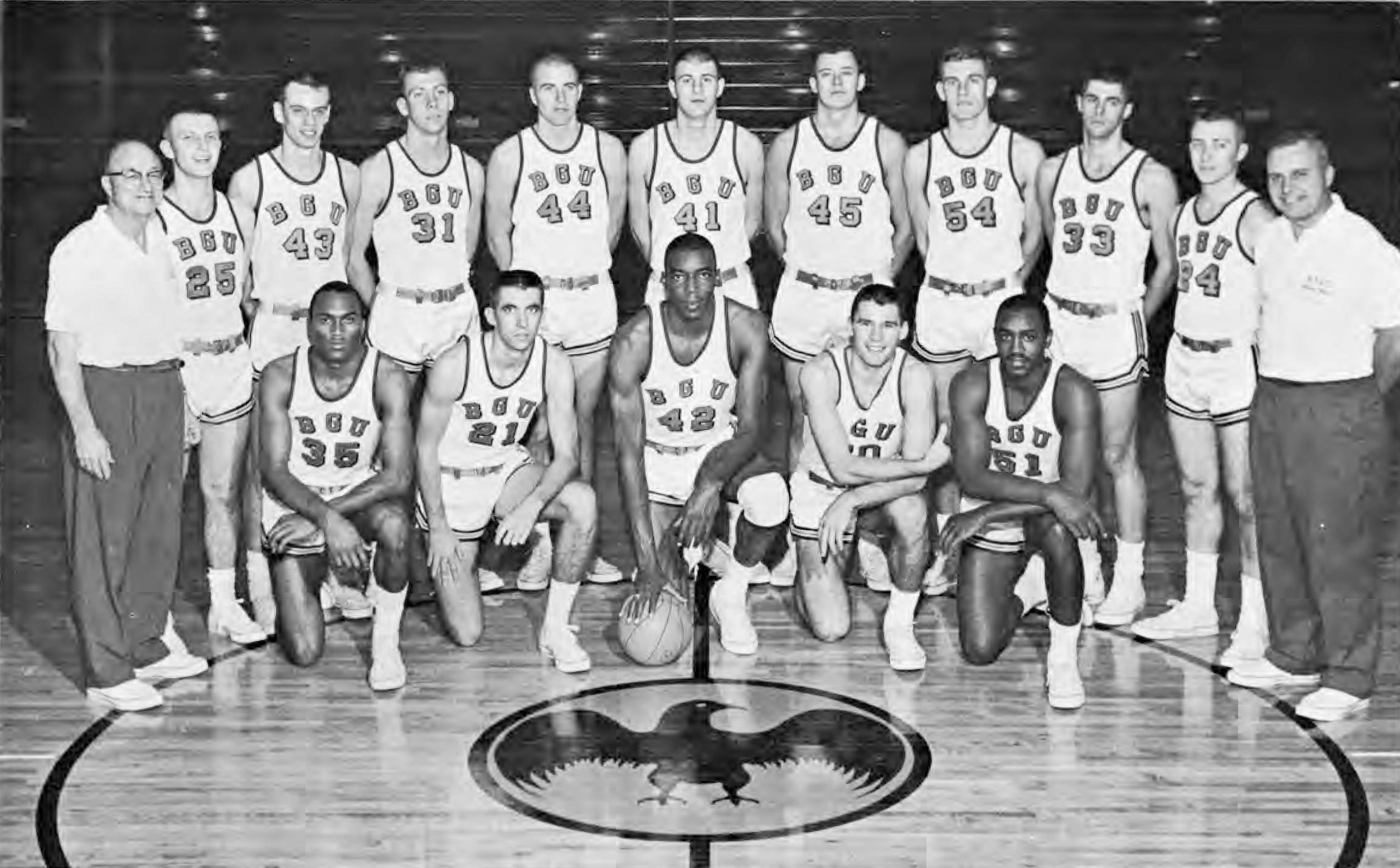
1962–63 team that competed in NCAA tournaments

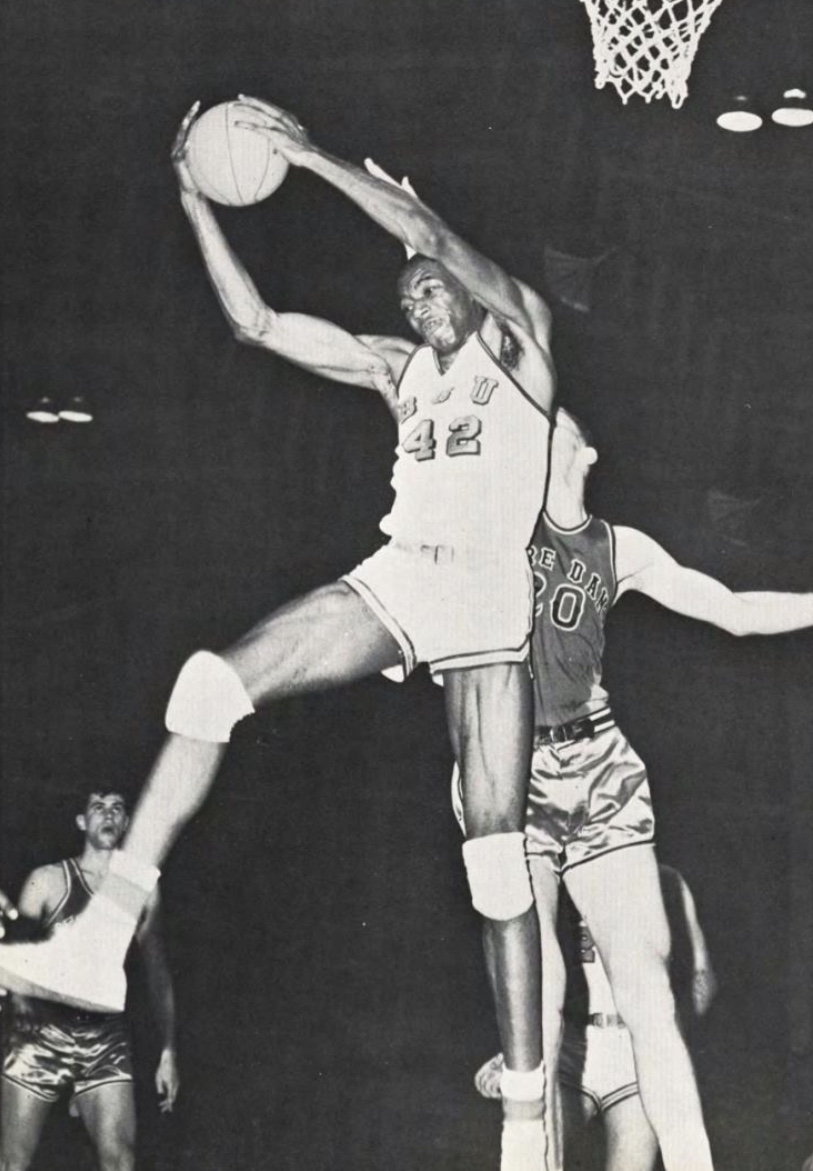
Nate Thurmond led the Falcons to NCAA appearances in 1962 and 1963.

Year	Round	Opponent	Result
1959	First round	Marquette	L 71–89
1962	First round	Butler	L 55–56
1963	First round Regional semifinal Regional third place Game	Notre Dame; Illinois; Mississippi State	W 77–72; L 61–70; L 60–65
1968	First round	Marquette	L 71–72

=== NIT results ===
The Falcons have appeared in 14 National Invitation Tournaments. Their combined record is 6–15.

Year	Round	Opponent	Result
1944	Quarterfinals	St. John's	L 40–44
1945	Quarterfinals; Semifinals; Championship Game; Charity Game	RPI; St. John's; DePaul; NYU	W 80–74; W 57–44; L 54–71; L 61–63
1946	Quarterfinals	Rhode Island	L 79–82
1948	Quarterfinals	Saint Louis	L 53–69
1949	First round Quarterfinals; Semifinals; Third-place game	St. John's; Saint Louis; San Francisco; Bradley	W 77–64; W 80–74; L 39–49; W 82–77
1954	First round Quarterfinals	Wichita State; Western Kentucky	W 88–64; L 81–95
1980	First round	Minnesota	L 50–64
1983	First round	Michigan State	L 71–72
1990	First round	Cincinnati	L 60–75
1991	First round	Wisconsin	L 79–87
1997	First round	West Virginia	L 95–98
2000	First round	BYU	L 54–81
2002	First round	Butler	L 69–81
2009	First round	Creighton	L 71–73

=== CIT results ===
The Falcons have appeared in two CollegeInsider.com Postseason Tournament. Their combined record is 1–2.

Year	Round	Opponent	Result
2012	First round	Oakland	L 86–69
2015	First round Second Round	Saint Francis (PA); Canisius	W 67–64; L 82–59

=== CBI results ===
The Falcons have appeared in one College Basketball Invitational (CBI). Their record is 0–1.

Year	Round	Opponent	Result
2021	First round	Stetson	L 52–53

=== CCAT results ===
The Falcons appeared in one Collegiate Commissioners Association Tournament, a tournament that was only held twice. Their record is 1–1.

Year	Round	Opponent	Result
1975	Quarterfinals; Semifinals	Tennessee; Drake	W 67–58; L 78–65

== Awards ==
=== Mid-American Conference Player of the Year ===
- Jim Penix (1969–1970)
- Antonio Daniels (1996–1997)
- Anthony Stacey (1999–2000)
- Keith McLeod (2001–2002)

=== Mid-American Conference Coach of the Year ===
- John Weinert (1978)
- Jim Larranaga (1997)
- Louis Orr (2009)

=== Mid-American Conference Freshman of the Year ===
- Shane Kline-Ruminski (1992)
- Antonio Daniels (1994)
- Anthony Stacey (1996)

=== Mid-American Conference Defensive Player of the Year ===
- DeMar Moore (1997)
- Richaun Holmes (2015)

== Falcons in the NBA ==
Name	Years in NBA
Johnny Payak	1950–1953
Mac Otten	1950
Don Otten	1950–1953
Leo Kubiak	1950
Chuck Share	1952–1960
Al Bianchi	1957–1966
Jimmy Darrow	1962
Nate Thurmond	1964–1977
Howard Komives	1965–1974
Cliff Williams	1969
Walt Piatkowski	1969–1972
Al Hairston	1969–1970
Cornelius Cash	1977
Antonio Daniels	1998–2011
Keith McLeod	2004–2007
Richaun Holmes	2016–present
Daeqwon Plowden	2024–present

=== Notable awards ===
- Don Otten — NBL Most Valuable Player (1949), All-NBL First Team (1949), All-NBL Second Team (1948), NBL scoring champion (1949)
- Chuck Share — NBA champion (1958)
- Al Bianchi — ABA Coach of the Year (1971)
- Nate Thurmond — Naismith Memorial Basketball Hall of Fame, 7× NBA All-Star (1965–1968, 1970, 1973, 1974), 2× NBA All-Defensive First Team (1969, 1971), 3× NBA All-Defensive Second Team (1972–1974), NBA All-Rookie First Team (1964), NBA anniversary team (50th, 75th), No. 42 retired by Golden State Warriors, No. 42 retired by Cleveland Cavaliers
- Howard Komives — NBA All-Rookie First Team (1965)
- Walt Piatkowski — ABA All-Rookie (1969)
- Antonio Daniels — NBA champion (1999)

==== Draft history ====
- 12 total NBA draft picks.
- 3 first round picks.
- 1 overall No. 1 pick – Chuck Share
- 3 top ten picks.

Year	Round	Pick	Player	Team
1948	4	N/A	Leo Kubiak	Waterloo Hawks
1949	3	N/A	Mac Otten	Indianapolis Olympians
1950	1	1	Chuck Share	Boston Celtics
1954	2	18	Al Bianchi	Minneapolis Lakers
1960	5	38	Jimmy Darrow	St. Louis Hawks
1963	1	3	Nate Thurmond	San Francisco Warriors
1964	2	15	Howard Komives	New York Knicks
1968	5	52	Al Hairston	Seattle SuperSonics
1968	8	99	Walt Piatkowski	San Francisco Warriors
1975	2	24	Cornelius Cash	Milwaukee Bucks
1997	1	4	Antonio Daniels	Vancouver Grizzlies
2015	2	37	Richaun Holmes	Philadelphia 76ers
