= 2024–25 Cleveland State Vikings men's basketball team =

American college basketball season

2024–25 Cleveland State Vikings men's basketball

CBI, Runner-up
- Conference: Horizon League
- Record: 23–13 (14–6 Horizon)
- Head coach: Daniyal Robinson (3rd season)
- Assistant coaches: Kwanza Johnson; Jay Shunnar; Deshon Parker; Steve Payne
- Home arena: Wolstein Center

2024–25 Horizon League men's basketball standings
	Conf.				Overall
Team	W		L	PCT	W		L	PCT
Robert Morris †	15	–	5	.750	26	–	9	.743
Cleveland State	14	–	6	.700	23	–	13	.639
Milwaukee	14	–	6	.700	21	–	11	.656
Youngstown State	13	–	7	.650	21	–	13	.618
Purdue Fort Wayne	12	–	8	.600	19	–	13	.594
Oakland	11	–	9	.550	16	–	18	.471
Northern Kentucky	11	–	9	.550	17	–	16	.515
Wright State	8	–	12	.400	15	–	18	.455
IU Indy	6	–	14	.300	10	–	22	.313
Detroit Mercy	4	–	16	.200	8	–	24	.250
Green Bay	2	–	18	.100	4	–	28	.125
† 2025 Horizon League tournament winner

The 2024–25 Cleveland State Vikings men's basketball team represented Cleveland State University during the 2024–25 NCAA Division I men's basketball season. The Vikings, led by third-year head coach Daniyal Robinson, played their home games at the Wolstein Center in Cleveland, Ohio as members of the Horizon League.

== Previous season ==
The Vikings finished the 2023–24 season 21–15, 11–9 in Horizon League play to finish in a tie for seventh place. They defeated IUPUI, and Youngstown State, before falling to top-seeded and eventual tournament champions Oakland in the semifinals of the Horizon League tournament. They received an invitation to the CBI, receiving the #9 seed, where they would defeat Northern Colorado in the first round, before falling to eventual tournament runner-up High Point in the quarterfinals.

== Roster ==
2024–25 Cleveland State Vikings men's basketball team
Players
Coaches

Pos.	#	Name	Height	Weight	Year	Previous school	Hometown
G	0	Tevin Smith	6 ft 4 in (1.93 m)	200 lb (91 kg)	Sr	Denver	Danville, Illinois
G	1	Tahj Staveskie	6 ft 1 in (1.85 m)	185 lb (84 kg)	RS Jr	Canisius	Sandusky, Ohio
G	2	Jalin Rice	6 ft 1 in (1.85 m)	183 lb (83 kg)	Sr	NE Mississippi Community College	Jackson, Mississippi
G	3	Tyler Spratt	6 ft 5 in (1.96 m)	198 lb (90 kg)	Fr	North Farmington High School	Farmington, Michigan
G	4	Je'Shawn Stevenson	6 ft 2 in (1.88 m)	200 lb (91 kg)	Fr	Lindblom High School	Chicago, Illinois
G	5	Danny Young	6 ft 1 in (1.85 m)	175 lb (79 kg)	RS Fr	Shaker Heights High School	Shaker Heights, Ohio
G	6	Ebrima Dibba	6 ft 6 in (1.98 m)	207 lb (94 kg)	RS Sr	South Carolina	Bredäng, Sweden
F	7	Isaac Abidde	6 ft 8 in (2.03 m)	211 lb (96 kg)	RS Jr	Wichita State	Albany, Georgia
G	11	Chaz Watson	6 ft 2 in (1.88 m)	188 lb (85 kg)	Fr	Lee's Summit West High School	Kansas City, Missouri
F	12	Dylan Arnett	6 ft 9 in (2.06 m)	240 lb (109 kg)	Jr	DePaul College Prep	Chicago, Illinois
F	15	Reece Robinson	6 ft 8 in (2.03 m)	223 lb (101 kg)	Fr	Saint Ignatius High School	Cleveland, Ohio
G	20	Cole Franklin	6 ft 4 in (1.93 m)	195 lb (88 kg)	So	Florida SouthWestern	DeSoto, Texas
G	22	Chase Robinson	6 ft 1 in (1.85 m)	205 lb (93 kg)	RS Sr	Illinois–Springfield	Matteson, Illinois
F	32	KJ Debrick	6 ft 9 in (2.06 m)	239 lb (108 kg)	Sr	John A. Logan College	Springfield, Illinois

Head coach

- Daniyal Robinson (Little Rock)

Assistant coach(es)

- Kwanza Johnson (Tulsa)
- Jay Shunnar (Michigan)
- Deshon Parker (Cleveland State)
- Steve Payne (Union (KY))

Legend

- (C) Team captain
- (S) Suspended
- (I) Ineligible
- (W) Walk-on
- Injured
- Current redshirt

Roster
Last update: November 5, 2024

== Schedule and results ==
Date time, TV	Rank^{#}	Opponent^{#}	Result	Record	High points	High rebounds	High assists	Site (attendance) city, state
Exhibition
October 30, 2024*; 7:00 pm		Lourdes	W 84–49	–	18 – Stevenson	6 – Arnett	3 – Tied	Woodling Gym (546); Cleveland, OH
Regular season
November 4, 2024*; 8:00 pm, BTN		at Michigan	L 53–101	0–1	7 – Tied	10 – Arnett	4 – Smith	Crisler Center (10,334); Ann Arbor, MI
November 6, 2024*; 7:00 pm, ESPN+		Baldwin Wallace	W 91–53	1–1	19 – Arnett	10 – Smith	5 – Dibba	Wolstein Center (1,179); Cleveland, OH
November 9, 2024*; 4:00 pm, ESPN+		at Kansas State	L 64–77	1–2	10 – Tied	7 – R. Robinson	4 – Dibba	Bramlage Coliseum (9,928); Manhattan, KS
November 12, 2024*; 8:00 pm, ESPN+		at Valparaiso	W 75–67	2–2	19 – Tied	14 – Arnett	6 – Staveskie	Athletics–Recreation Center; Valparaiso, IN
November 16, 2024*; 3:00 pm, ESPN+		Eastern Michigan	W 71–63	3–2	24 – Smith	7 – Tied	5 – Franklin	Wolstein Center (1,386); Cleveland, OH
November 19, 2024*; 7:00 pm, BTN		at Minnesota	L 47–58	3–3	10 – Smith	6 – Tied	3 – Tied	Williams Arena (7,051); Minneapolis, MN
November 23, 2024*; 7:00 pm, ESPN+		Kent State	L 52–68	3–4	11 – Tied	11 – Arnett	3 – C. Robinson	Wolstein Center (2,019); Cleveland, OH
November 26, 2024*; 6:00 pm, ESPN+		NJIT; Viking Invitational	W 56–53	4–4	13 – Smith	8 – Arnett	2 – Tied	Woodling Gym (403); Cleveland, OH
November 29, 2024*; 3:00 pm, ESPN+		Morehead State; Viking Invitational	L 69–71	4–5	18 – Staveskie	7 – Smith	1 – Tied	Woodling Gym (512); Cleveland, OH
December 5, 2024; 8:00 pm, ESPN+		at Milwaukee	L 67–79	4–6 (0–1)	17 – Smith	9 – Arnett	4 – Dibba	UWM Panther Arena (1,828); Milwaukee, WI
December 7, 2024; 3:00 pm, ESPN+		at Green Bay	W 83–61	5–6 (1–1)	20 – Stevenson	7 – Arnett	8 – Dibba	Resch Center (2,021); Ashwaubenon, WI
December 14, 2024*; 3:00 pm, ESPN+		Brescia	W 103–37	6–6	17 – Stevenson	13 – R. Robinson	8 – C. Robinson	Wolstein Center (868); Cleveland, OH
December 19, 2024; 7:00 pm, ESPN+		Oakland	W 92–75	7–6 (2–1)	37 – Smith	11 – Arnett	8 – Dibba	Wolstein Center (1,205); Cleveland, OH
December 22, 2024*; 12:00 pm, ESPN+		Midway	W 116–60	8–6	23 – Stevenson	10 – Tied	8 – Dibba	Wolstein Center (1,089); Cleveland, OH
December 29, 2024; 3:00 pm, ESPN+		Wright State	W 78–64	9–6 (3–1)	16 – C. Robinson	7 – Arnett	7 – Dibba	Wolstein Center (1,692); Cleveland, OH
January 4, 2025; 3:00 pm, ESPN+		IU Indy	W 67–61	10–6 (4–1)	20 – Staveskie	7 – Tied	4 – C. Robinson	Wolstein Center (1,126); Cleveland, OH
January 8, 2025; 7:00 pm, ESPN+		at Robert Morris	W 80–69	11–6 (5–1)	16 – Arnett	10 – Smith	5 – Smith	UPMC Events Center (646); Moon Township, PA
January 11, 2025; 2:00 pm, ESPN+		at Youngstown State	W 80–72	12–6 (6–1)	21 – Staveskie	12 – Arnett	7 – Smith	Beeghly Center (1,905); Youngstown, OH
January 15, 2025; 7:00 pm, ESPN+		Northern Kentucky	W 76–58	13–6 (7–1)	20 – Staveskie	10 – Robinson	4 – Dibba	Wolstein Center (1,275); Cleveland, OH
January 19, 2025; 2:00 pm, ESPN+		at IU Indy	W 73–62	14–6 (8–1)	16 – Smith	8 – Arnett	8 – Dibba	The Jungle (868); Indianapolis, IN
January 22, 2025; 7:00 pm, ESPN+		Detroit Mercy	W 65–50	15–6 (9–1)	23 – Smith	7 – Arnett	3 – Tied	Wolstein Center (1,623); Cleveland, OH
January 25, 2025; 3:00 pm, ESPN+		Green Bay	W 81–66	16–6 (10–1)	17 – C. Robinson	11 – R. Robinson	5 – Smith	Wolstein Center (1,830); Cleveland, OH
January 30, 2025; 9:00 pm, ESPNU		at Purdue Fort Wayne	W 68–58	17–6 (11–1)	20 – C. Robinson	15 – Arnett	6 – Dibba	Memorial Coliseum (2,603); Fort Wayne, IN
February 5, 2025; 7:00 pm, ESPN+		at Northern Kentucky	L 75–85	17–7 (11–2)	18 – Smith	6 – Tied	6 – Dibba	Truist Arena (2,380); Highland Heights, KY
February 8, 2025; 3:00 pm, ESPN+		Milwaukee	W 77–60	18–7 (12–2)	30 – Staveskie	7 – Arnett	4 – Staveskie	Wolstein Center (2,269); Cleveland, OH
February 12, 2025; 7:00 pm, ESPN+		Robert Morris	L 59–68	18–8 (12–3)	16 – Arnett	8 – Arnett	3 – Dibba	Wolstein Center (1,654); Cleveland, OH
February 16, 2025; 2:00 pm, ESPNU		Youngstown State	L 60–68	18–9 (12–4)	16 – Arnett	7 – Arnett	3 – Tied	Wolstein Center (2,554); Cleveland, OH
February 21, 2025; 7:00 pm, ESPN+		at Detroit Mercy	W 73–65	19–9 (13–4)	22 – Staveskie	5 – C. Robinson	5 – Dibba	Calihan Hall (1,001); Detroit, MI
February 23, 2025; 3:00 pm, ESPN+		at Oakland	L 86–91 ^{OT}	19–10 (13–5)	18 – C. Robinson	8 – Dibba	6 – Dibba	OU Credit Union O'rena (2,187); Auburn Hills, MI
February 27, 2025; 9:00 pm, ESPN2		at Wright State	L 76–82	19–11 (13–6)	20 – Arnett	8 – Arnett	7 – Dibba	Nutter Center (3,587); Fairborn, OH
March 1, 2025; 4:00 pm, ESPN2		Purdue Fort Wayne	W 68–57	20–11 (14–6)	17 – Smith	10 – Arnett	4 – Dibba	Wolstein Center (1,849); Cleveland, OH
Horizon League tournament
March 6, 2025; 8:00 pm, ESPN+	(2)	(7) Northern Kentucky; Quarterfinals	W 68–63	21–11	16 – Tied	10 – Arnett	4 – Tied	Wolstein Center (1,465); Cleveland, OH
March 10, 2025; 9:30 pm, ESPN2	(2)	vs. (4) Youngstown State; Semifinals	L 54–56	21–12	14 – Smith	7 – Abidde	4 – Dibba	Corteva Coliseum (1,775); Indianapolis, IN
CBI
March 24, 2025; 4:00 pm, FloHoops		vs. Queens; Quarterfinals	W 88–73	22–12	29 – Staveskie	6 – Arnett	4 – Staveskie	Ocean Center (611); Daytona Beach, FL
March 25, 2025; 9:00 pm, ESPNU		vs. Florida Gulf Coast; Semifinals	W 72–65	23–12	17 – Stevenson	6 – Tied	2 – Tied	Ocean Center (632); Daytona Beach, FL
March 26, 2025; 5:00 pm, ESPN2		vs. Illinois State; Championship	L 68–79	23–13	16 – Smith	5 – Tied	2 – Tied	Ocean Center (541); Daytona Beach, FL
*Non-conference game. ^{#}Rankings from AP Poll. (#) Tournament seedings in parentheses. All times are in Eastern.
