= 2020 College Basketball Invitational =

College basketball tournament

- Teams: 16 (planned)
- Finals site: ,

The 2020 College Basketball Invitational (CBI) was a planned single-elimination men's college basketball tournament to consist of 16 National Collegiate Athletic Association (NCAA) Division I teams that did not participate in the 2020 NCAA Division I men's basketball tournament or the NIT. This event would have marked the 13th annual tournament. On March 11, the tournament was canceled due to the COVID-19 pandemic.
