= John Weinert =

American college basketball coach (1931-2015)

John Weinert (September 5, 1931 – July 30, 2015) was an American college basketball coach. He coached Bowling Green from 1976 to 1986.

Born on September 5, 1931, to Violet and Anthony Weinert, John Weinert competed in football and basketball while at Rufus King High School in Milwaukee, Wisconsin. He enrolled at the University of Notre Dame but transferred to the University of Wisconsin to complete a degree in physical education. Later, Weinert earned a master's degree at Northern Michigan University. He served in the army before launching his coaching career at his high school alma mater. Afterwards he led the Ripon College Redmen to multiple conference championships and earned coach of the year honors. He accepted the head coaching job at St. Joseph’s College of Indiana in 1972, a team that struggled prior to his arrival. Weinert coached St. Joseph’s to three consecutive NCAA Division II basketball tournaments and the 1974-75 Indiana Collegiate Conference title before leaving to take the head coaching job at Bowling Green for the 1975-76 season.

At Bowling Green, Weinert became well known for his quirky sense of fashion, including an orange sport coat. He compiled a record of 146–133 in ten years leading the Falcons. In 1978, the Mid-American Conference coaches named him coach of the year, with the Basketball Times giving him the same honor in 1980. In 1981, Weinert coached Bowling Green to a MAC co-championship and led the team to an outright championship two years later. In 1986, in the midst of a losing season, Weinert announced his retirement. "Being a coach for 24 consecutive years, well, there’s been a lot of pressure and a lot of decisions," Weinert said.

Weinert's first wife Shirley (nee Zeegers) was battling cancer at the time of his retirement from Bowling Green, which was one of the factors in his decision to retire. She died on August 7, 1987; he remarried Elaine in 1990. He had two daughters and one son. He led the U.S. Development Team in Amman, Jordan, in 1990. Weinert joined the board of directors of Towne Bancorp in 1992 in what turned out to be a poor investment, with the company going bankrupt in 1998. He died on July 30, 2015, in Ellenton Hospice House in Palmetto, Florida. The cause of death was pneumonia, although he also had lung cancer for two years.
