= Dan Dakich =

American sports radio host and former basketball player and coach

Biographical details
- Born: August 17, 1962 (age 64); Gary, Indiana, U.S.

Playing career
- 1981–1985: Indiana

Coaching career (HC unless noted)
- 1985–1997: Indiana (assistant)
- 1997–2007: Bowling Green
- 2008: Indiana (interim HC)

Administrative career (AD unless noted)
- 2007–2008: Indiana (DBO)

Head coaching record
- Overall: 159–144
- Tournaments: 0–1 (NCAA Division I); 0–2 (NIT)

Accomplishments and honors

Championships
- MAC regular season (2000)

Daniel John Dakich (born August 17, 1962) is an American basketball sportscaster. He is a former player, assistant coach, interim head coach for the Indiana University Hoosiers, former head coach at Bowling Green State University and a member of the Indiana Basketball Hall Of Fame. He currently is the host of Don't @ Me on Fox Sports OutKick.

== Playing career ==
Dakich attended Andrean High School in Merrillville, Indiana. He played basketball for Indiana under coach Bob Knight from 1981 to 1985, serving as a team captain during his junior and senior years.

== Coaching career ==
=== Assistant coach ===
Dakich a graduate assistant coach at Indiana under Bob Knight from 1985 to 1987 and then an assistant coach from 1987 to 1997. Dakich assisted in the development of six All-Americans and three national Player of the Year candidates, including 1993 Player of the Year Calbert Cheaney.

=== Head coach ===
From 1997 to 2007, Dakich was head coach at Bowling Green State University. He coached Keith McLeod. During Dakich's tenure, BGSU never made it to the NCAA tournament. Dakich had losing seasons in four of his last five years with BGSU, and resigned as head coach in 2007.

Briefly in 2002, Dakich was named head basketball coach at West Virginia University (WVU) to succeed Gale Catlett. When Dakich learned that people affiliated with the basketball program may have been guilty of NCAA recruiting rules infractions, he returned to Bowling Green as head basketball coach after only a week at WVU. WVU voluntarily reported results of its internal investigation to the NCAA, and the university was not penalized as a result of the infractions. The focus of the investigation, Jonathan Hargett, was banned from WVU athletics for his role in the reported violations.

At the end of the 2008 season he served as the interim head coach at Indiana University, following Kelvin Sampson's resignation due to NCAA recruiting violations. Under Dakich's guidance, the Hoosiers went 0–2 in postseason play, losing in the first rounds of the Big 10 and NCAA tournaments. After the season, IU declined to offer Dakich the job and hired Tom Crean.

=== Relationship with Bob Knight ===
Dakich spent 16 years with Knight, four as a player and twelve as an assistant. Dakich said that the reason he stayed so long was because Knight had promised him that he would be Knight's successor at IU. Prior to Knight's death however, their relationship had deteriorated. In 2017, Dakich said that he had 'lost all respect' for Knight after Knight failed to attend a ceremony honoring the undefeated 1976 IU basketball team.

== Television and radio career ==
From 2008 through 2022, Dakich was the host of "The Dan Dakich Show" on Indianapolis radio station WFNI, ESPN radio affiliate, 1070 The Fan.

Dakich served as a college basketball studio analyst for the Big Ten Network for the 2009–2010 college basketball season.

In November 2010, Dakich replaced Steve Lavin on ESPN as a college basketball color commentator and analyst. In 2021, Dakich left ESPN and joined Fox Sports' OutKick as a host.

In January 2024, Dakich started hosting a weekday radio show on WXNT AM in Indianapolis.

=== Controversy ===
In October 2019, Dakich was suspended from his show for failing "to adhere to the journalistic principles valued by" Emmis Communications, which owns WFNI.

In March 2020, Dakich responded to the firing of Scottsburg (IN) High School basketball coach Brent Jameson by "calling a player a 'methhead', urging listeners to go 'take a dump' in Scottsburg and threatening, 'I may just drive down there and beat the hell out of every school board member.'" He also called Scottsburg "a town full of 'meth and AIDS and needles'". Dakich responded by saying, "Tone is important people. . . . Sometimes you can't get tone out of newspaper articles and things. Sometimes what's funny when said or trying to be funny doesn't come across."

According to reporter Ian Kennedy, Dakich criticized Dr. Nathan Kalman-Lamb and Dr. Johanna Mellis, co-hosts of The End of Sport podcast, using "sexist and misogynistic" language for their discussion of the ways college athletes are mistreated and exploited. Dakich reportedly called Kalman-Lamb "a d-bag" and declined "'going at it' in a pool with Dr. Mellis, saying that if he did, because it was a public place, he'd 'have to get divorced'".

In October 2025, Dakich made statements characterized as "racist" after former NFL quarterback Mark Sanchez was involved in a violent incident in downtown Indianapolis. Dakich tweeted, in part, that "Sanchez or anyone being stabbed downtown indy should not be a surprise we have a ton of fatherless and armed African American kids descending on downtown Indy every weekend if that offends you f off." Police reports soon after indicated that it was Sanchez himself who had prompted the violent incident that resulted in Sanchez being stabbed, and that Sanchez was arrested later the same day for his role in the incident.

In April 2026, Dakich reacted on social media site X (formerly Twitter) to news of Sue Bird and Megan Rapinoe's separation by asserting that Bird was "not a lifetime lesbian" and had been "recruited (as so many poor college athletes do) into that life." Neither Dakich nor Bird indicated anything about their sexual orientations or changes thereto in their public statements.

== Head coaching record ==
Record table
| Season | Team | Overall | Conference | Standing | Postseason |
|---|---|---|---|---|---|
Bowling Green Falcons (Mid-American Conference) (1997–2007)
| 1997–98 | Bowling Green | 10–16 | 7–11 | T–4th (East) | |
| 1998–99 | Bowling Green | 18–10 | 12–6 | T–3rd (East) | |
| 1999–00 | Bowling Green | 22–8 | 14–4 | 1st (East) | NIT first round |
| 2000–01 | Bowling Green | 15–14 | 10–8 | T–4th (East) | |
| 2001–02 | Bowling Green | 24–9 | 12–6 | 2nd (East) | NIT first round |
| 2002–03 | Bowling Green | 13–16 | 8–10 | T–4th (West) | |
| 2003–04 | Bowling Green | 14–17 | 8–10 | 4th (West) | |
| 2004–05 | Bowling Green | 18–11 | 10–8 | T–3rd (West) | |
| 2005–06 | Bowling Green | 9–21 | 5–13 | 6th (East) | |
| 2006–07 | Bowling Green | 13–18 | 3–13 | 6th (East) | |
| Bowling Green: | | 156–140 (.527) | 89–89 (.500) | | |
Indiana Hoosiers (Big Ten Conference) (2008)
| 2007–08 | Indiana | 3–4 | 3–2 | 3rd | NCAA Division I First Round |
| Indiana: | | 3–4 (.429) | 3–2 (.600) | | |
| Total: | | 159–144 (.525) | | | |
National champion Postseason invitational champion Conference regular season champion Conference regular season and conference tournament champion Division regular season champion Division regular season and conference tournament champion Conference tournament champion

== Personal ==
Dakich married his first wife Jackie in 1990 and they divorced in 2012. They have two children together, Andrew and Laura. In 2015 Dakich married Leigh (Ross) Dakich.
