= Wright State Raiders men's basketball statistical leaders =

The Wright State Raiders men's basketball statistical leaders are individual statistical leaders of the Wright State Raiders men's basketball program in various categories, including points and rebounds. The lists identify single-game, single-season, and career leaders. The Raiders represent the Wright State University in the NCAA's Horizon League.

Wright State began competing in intercollegiate basketball in 1970. The NCAA did not officially record assists as a stat until the 1983–84 season, and blocks and steals until the 1985–86 season, but Wright State's record books includes players in these stats before these seasons. These lists are updated through the 2025–26 season.

== Scoring ==
Career
Rk	Player	Points	Seasons
1	Bill Edwards	2,303	1989–90 1990–91 1991–92 1992–93
2	Trey Calvin	2,139	2019–20 2020–21 2021–22 2022–23 2023–24
3	Tanner Holden	2,003	2019–20 2020–21 2021–22 2022–23 2023–24
4	DaShaun Wood	1,849	2003–04 2004–05 2005–06 2006–07
5	Loudon Love	1,792	2017–18 2018–19 2019–20 2020–21
6	Vaughn Duggins	1,777	2006–07 2007–08 2008–09 2009–10 2010–11
7	Keion Brooks	1,766	1995–96 1996–97 1997–98 1998–99
8	Vernard Hollins	1,700	2000–01 2001–02 2002–03 2003–04
9	Bob Schaefer	1,634	1975–76 1976–77 1977–78 1978–79
10	Sean Hammonds	1,573	1990–91 1991–92 1992–93 1993–94

Season
Rk	Player	Points	Season
1	Bill Edwards	757	1992–93
2	Tanner Holden	723	2021–22
3	Grant Basile	664	2021–22
4	Trey Calvin	651	2022–23
5	DaShaun Wood	648	2006–07
6	Brandon Noel	627	2024–25
7	Seth Doliboa	625	2002–03
8	Rodney Benson	612	1980–81
9	Brad Smith	608	1988–89
	Mark Alstork	608	2016–17

Single game
Rk	Player	Points	Date	Opponent
1	Bill Edwards	45	December 8, 1992	Morehead State
2	Trey Calvin	44	February 3, 2023	Youngstown State
3	Mark Vest	43	January 27, 1984	Marycrest
4	Tim Walker	42	January 5, 1972	Marian

== Assists ==
Career
Rk	Player	Assists	Seasons
1	Mark Woods	744	1988–89 1989–90 1990–91 1991–92 1992–93
2	Lenny Lyons	571	1984–85 1985–86 1986–87
3	Trey Calvin	478	2019–20 2020–21 2021–22 2022–23 2023–24
4	Vernard Hollins	472	2000–01 2001–02 2002–03 2003–04
5	DaShaun Wood	451	2003–04 2004–05 2005–06 2006–07
6	Eddie Crowe	437	1977–78 1978–79 1979–80 1980–81
7	Keion Brooks	400	1995–96 1996–97 1997–98 1998–99
8	Rick Martin	352	1972–73 1973–74 1974–75 1975–76
9	Vaughn Duggins	330	2006–07 2007–08 2008–09 2009–10 2010–11
	Will Graham	330	2005–06 2006–07 2007–08 2008–09

Season
Rk	Player	Assists	Season
1	Lenny Lyons	259	1985–86
2	Mark Woods	253	1992–93
3	Mark Woods	206	1990–91
4	Lenny Lyons	199	1986–87
5	Corey Brown	163	1987–88
6	Mark Woods	156	1988–89
7	Tyrell Cromwell	147	1989–90
8	Anthony Bias	135	1981–82
9	Bill Wilson	133	1979–80
10	DaShaun Wood	131	2005–06
	DaShaun Wood	131	2006–07
	Trey Calvin	131	2023–24

Single game
Rk	Player	Assists	Season	Opponent
1	Lenny Lyons	15	February 8, 1986	Kentucky Wesleyan
	Lenny Lyons	15	February 27, 1986	Kentucky State

== 3 Point Field Goals ==
Career
Rk	Player	3 Pt Field Goals	Seasons
1	Grant Benzinger	291	2014–15 2015–16 2021–22 2016–17 2017–18
2	Trey Calvin	244	2019–20 2020–21 2021–22 2022–23 2023–24
3	Alex Huibregtse	227	2020–21 2021–22 2022–23 2023–24 2024–25
4	Andy Holderman	197	1990–91 1991–92 1992–93 1993–94
	Todd Brown	197	2006–07 2007–08 2008–09 2009–10
6	Vaughn Duggins	187	2006–07 2007–08 2008–09 2009–10 2010–11
7	Marcus Mumphrey	179	1988–89 1989–90 1990–91 1991–92
8	Reggie Arceneaux	173	2012-13 2012-13 2013-14 2014-15
9	Rob Welch	167	1994–95
10	Troy Tabler	165	2007–08 2008–09 2009–10 2010–11

Season
Rk	Player	3 Pt Field Goals	Season
1	Cain Doliboa	104	2001–02
2	Grant Benzinger	92	2017–18
3	Alex Huibregtse	90	2024–25
4	Andy Holderman	82	1993–94
5	Andy Holderman	81	1992–93
6	Bill Wampler	78	2018–19
	Grant Benzinger	78	2016–17
8	Bill Wampler	74	2019–20
9	Rob Welch	72	1994–95
10	Mark Alstork	70	2016–17
	Solomon Callaghan	70	2025–26

Single game
Rk	Player	3 Pt Field Goals	Date	Opponent
1	Marcus Mumphrey	9	January 20, 1988	Youngstown State
	Marcus Mumphrey	9	February 20, 1989	Brooklyn
	Marcus Mumphrey	9	February 9, 1991	Southern Utah

== Rebounds ==
Career
Rk	Player	Rebounds	Seasons
1	Loudon Love	1,124	2017–18 2018–19 2019–20 2020–21
2	Bill Edwards	907	1989–90 1990–91 1991–92 1992–93
3	Tanner Holden	844	2019–20 2020–21 2021–22 2023–24
4	Sean Hammonds	828	1989–90 1990–91 1991–92 1992–93
5	Brandon Noel	789	2022–23 2023–24 2024–25
6	Jim Minch	784	1970–71 1971–72 1972–73 1973–74
7	Bill Fogt	738	1970–71 1971–72 1972–73 1973–74
8	Bob Schaefer	717	1975–76 1976–77 1977–78 1978–79
9	Jordan Pleiman	685	2004–05 2005–06 2006–07 2007–08
10	Grant Basile	616	2018–19 2019–20 2020–21 2021–22

Season
Rk	Player	Rebounds	Season
1	Loudon Love	341	2017–18
2	Grant Basile	307	2021–22
3	Thad Burton	305	1997–98
4	Rondey Robinson	299	1988–89
5	Bill Edwards	289	1992–93
6	Brandon Noel	288	2022–23
7	Loudon Love	280	2018–19
8	Justin Mitchell	267	2016–17
9	Brad Smith	266	1988–89
10	Loudon Love	261	2019–20

Single game
Rk	Player	Rebounds	Date	Opponent
1	Thad Burton	22	November 18, 1997	Old Dominion

== Steals ==
Career
Rk	Player	Steals	Seasons
1	Mark Woods	314	1988–89 1989–90 1990–91 1991–92 1992–93
2	Rick Martin	261	1972–73 1973–74 1974–75 1975–76
3	Bob Grote	228	1972–73 1973–74 1974–75 1975–76
4	Bill Fogt	223	1970–71 1971–72 1972–73 1973–74
5	DaShaun Wood	208	2003–04 2004–05 2005–06 2006–07
6	Keion Brooks	200	1995–96 1996–97 1997–98 1998–99
7	Trey Calvin	199	2019–20 2020–21 2021–22 2022–23 2023–24
8	Joe Jackson	195	1984–85 1985–86 1986–87 1987–88
9	Tim Walker	191	1971–72 1972–73 1973–74
10	Lenny Lyons	173	1984–85 1985–86 1986–87

Season
Rk	Player	Steals	Season
1	Mark Woods	109	1992–93
2	Rick Martin	103	1974–75
3	Bob Grote	99	1974–75
4	Rick Martin	94	1973–74
5	Dave Magill	88	1970–71
	TJ Burch	88	2025–26
7	Mark Donahue	85	1970–71
8	Mark Woods	81	1990–91
9	Bob Grote	78	1973–74
10	Joe Jackson	76	1986–87
	Mark Woods	76	1988–89

Single game
Rk	Player	Steals	Season	Opponent
1	Mark Woods	8	December 5, 1992	Wilmington

== Blocks ==
Career
Rk	Player	Blocks	Seasons
1	Loudon Love	138	2017–18 2018–19 2019–20 2020–21
2	Grant Basile	127	2018–19 2019–20 2020–21 2021–22
3	James Jones	99	1984–85 1985–86 1986–87 1987–88
4	Dave Dinn	90	1986–87 1987–88 1988–89 1989–90 1990–91
	Brandon Noel	90	2022–23 2023–24 2024–25
6	Bruno Petersons	84	1997–98 1998–99 1999–00 2000–01
7	Mike Nahar	83	1989–90 1990–91 1991–92 1992–93 1993–94
8	Bill Edwards	80	1989–90 1990–91 1991–92 1992–93
9	Seth Doliboa	79	2001–02 2002–03 2003–04
10	Fred Moore	76	1981–82 1982–83 1983–84

Season
Rk	Player	Blocks	Season
1	Grant Basile	59	2021–22
2	James Jones	51	1986–87
3	Kellen Pickett	46	2025–26
4	Andrea Holden	42	2025–26
5	Jerran Young	41	2013–14
6	Rodney Benson	40	1980–81
	Mike Nahar	40	1993–94
	Loudon Love	40	2019–20
9	Vitaly Potapenko	39	1994–95
	Bruno Petersons	39	2000–01
	Grant Basile	39	2020–21
