= List of Wright State Raiders men's basketball seasons =

This is a complete list of Wright State Raiders men's basketball teams seasons, from their first season in 1970 to present.

== Seasons ==
WSU's records season by season during their Division II tenure.

Season	Head coach	Overall record	Conf. record	Standing	Postseason
Division II Independent
1970–71	John Ross	7–17	–	–	–
1971–72	John Ross	9–14	–	–	–
1972–73	John Ross	17–5	–	–	–
1973–74	John Ross	17–8	–	–	–
1974–75	John Ross	15–10	–	–	–
1975–76	Marcus Jackson	20–8	–	–	NCAA D-II Regional
1976–77	Marcus Jackson	11–16	–	–	–
1977–78	Marcus Jackson	14–13	–	–	–
1978–79	Ralph Underhill	20–8	–	–	NCAA D-II Regional
1979–80	Ralph Underhill	25–3	–	–	NCAA D-II Regional
1980–81	Ralph Underhill	25–4	–	–	NCAA D-II Regional
1981–82	Ralph Underhill	22–7	–	–	NCAA D-II Regional
1982–83	Ralph Underhill	28–4	–	–	NCAA D-II National champions
1983–84	Ralph Underhill	19–9	–	–	–
1984–85	Ralph Underhill	22–7	–	–	NCAA D-II Regional
1985–86	Ralph Underhill	28–3	–	–	NCAA D-II Quarterfinals
1986–87	Ralph Underhill	20–8	–	–	–

WSU's records season by season since joining Division I in 1987.

Season	Head coach	Overall record	Conf. record	Standing	Postseason
Division I Independent
1987–88	Ralph Underhill	16–11	–	–	–
1988–89	Ralph Underhill	17–11	–	–	–
1989–90	Ralph Underhill	21–7	–	–	–
1990–91	Ralph Underhill	19–9	–	–	–
Mid-Continent Conference
1991–92	Ralph Underhill	15–13	9–7	T–4th	–
1992–93	Ralph Underhill	20–10	10–6	T–2nd	NCAA 1st Round
1993–94	Ralph Underhill	12–18	9–9	T–4th	–
Midwestern Collegiate Conference
1994–95	Ralph Underhill	13–17	6–8	8th	–
1995–96	Ralph Underhill	14–13	8–8	T–4th	–
1996–97	Jim Brown	7–20	5–11	8th	–
1997–98	Ed Schilling	10–18	3–11	7th	–
1998–99	Ed Schilling	9–18	4–10	7th	–
1999–2000	Ed Schilling	11–17	6–8	T–4th	–
2000–01	Ed Schilling	18–11	8–6	4th	–
Horizon League
2001–02	Ed Schilling	17–11	8–6	T–4th	–
2002–03	Ed Schilling	10–18	4–12	T–6th	–
2003–04	Paul Biancardi	14–14	10–6	T–4th	–
2004–05	Paul Biancardi	15–15	8–8	T–4th	–
2005–06	Paul Biancardi	13–15	8–8	T–3rd	–
2006–07	Brad Brownell	23–10	13–3	T–1st	NCAA 1st Round
2007–08	Brad Brownell	21–10	12–6	T–2nd	–
2008–09	Brad Brownell	20–13	12–6	T–3rd	–
2009–10	Brad Brownell	20–12	12–6	2nd	–
2010–11	Billy Donlon	19–14	10–8	T–5th	–
2011–12	Billy Donlon	13–19	7–11	8th	–
2012–13	Billy Donlon	21–12	10–6	T–3rd	CBI Semi-Finals
2013–14	Billy Donlon	21–15	10–6	3rd	CIT 2nd Round
2014–15	Billy Donlon	11–20	3–13	8th	–
2015–16	Billy Donlon	22–13	13–5	T–2nd	–
2016–17	Scott Nagy	20–12	11–7	5th	–
2017–18	Scott Nagy	25–9	14–4	2nd	NCAA 1st Round
2018–19	Scott Nagy	21–13	13–5	T–1st	NIT 1st Round
2019–20	Scott Nagy	25–7	15–3	1st	NIT (Note: No tournaments held due to the COVID-19 pandemic.)
2020–21	Scott Nagy	18–6	16–4	T–1st	–
2021–22	Scott Nagy	22–14	15–7	T–3rd	NCAA 1st Round
2022–23	Scott Nagy	18–15	10–10	T–6th	–
2023–24	Scott Nagy	18–14	13–7	T–3rd	–
2024–25	Clint Sargent	15–18	8–12	8th	–
2025–26	Clint Sargent	23–12	15–5	1st	NCAA 1st Round
2026–27	Clint Sargent	-	–	-	-
