= 1973–74 Wright State Raiders men's basketball team =

American college basketball season

1973–74 Wright State Raiders men's basketball
- Conference: Independent
- Record: 17–8
- Head coach: John Ross (4th season)
- Assistant coaches: Jim Brown; Ray Ridenour
- Home arena: WSU PE Building

The 1973–74 Wright State Raiders men's basketball team, led by head coach John Ross, represented Wright State University in the 1973-74 NCAA NCAA Division II men's basketball season. They played their home games at the newly built Wright State Physical Education Building in Fairborn, OH.

== Previous season ==
In 1972-73 the Raiders soared to their first winning season, finishing 17–5 in just the third year of varsity basketball.

== Season summary ==
The 1973-74 Raiders won 17 for the second year in a row. Their second winning season firmly established the WSU PE Building as tough court to visit.

== Roster ==
1973–74 Wright State Raiders men's basketball team
Players
Coaches

Pos.	#	Name	Height	Weight	Year	Previous school	Hometown
G	141	Phil McKee	6 ft 0 in (1.83 m)	175 lb (79 kg)	Jr	Shawnee	Lima, Ohio
C	25	Jim Minch	6 ft 6 in (1.98 m)	190 lb (86 kg)	Sr	Carroll	Xenia, Ohio
C	31	Dan Swain	6 ft 8 in (2.03 m)	205 lb (93 kg)	Jr	Beavercreek	Beavercreek, Ohio
G	23	Tim Walker	6 ft 2 in (1.88 m)	180 lb (82 kg)	Sr	Centerville	Centerville, Ohio
F	30	Bob Grote	6 ft 3 in (1.91 m)	190 lb (86 kg)	So	Elder	Cincinnati, Ohio
F	21	Bill Fogt	6 ft 3 in (1.91 m)	185 lb (84 kg)	Sr	Piqua	Piqua, Ohio
G	10	Rick Martin	5 ft 10 in (1.78 m)	155 lb (70 kg)	So	Middletown	Middletown, Ohio
F	20	Lyle Falknor	6 ft 5 in (1.96 m)	158 lb (72 kg)	So	New Madison	New Madison, Ohio
F	32	Jim Cunningham	6 ft 8 in (2.03 m)	206 lb (93 kg)	Sr	Alter	Miamisburg, Ohio
C	22	Greg McCurdy	6 ft 7 in (2.01 m)	200 lb (91 kg)	Sr	Centerville	Centerville, Ohio
G	11	Jim Hough	6 ft 0 in (1.83 m)	170 lb (77 kg)	Fr	Springboro	Springboro, Ohio
G	13	Dan Brinkman	6 ft 2 in (1.88 m)	175 lb (79 kg)	So	Alter	Dayton, Ohio
F	12	Neil Reif	6 ft 5 in (1.96 m)	185 lb (84 kg)	Fr	Indian Hill	Cincinnati, Ohio
F	24	Mike Herr	6 ft 4 in (1.93 m)	185 lb (84 kg)	Fr	Elder	Cincinnati, Ohio
C	15	Ken Millisor (injured)	6 ft 7 in (2.01 m)	185 lb (84 kg)	Fr	Fairfield Union	Bremen, Ohio

Head coach

- John Ross (Wilmington)

Assistant coach(es)

Jim Brown (Dayton), Ray Ridenour(Georgia Tech)

Legend

- (C) Team captain
- (S) Suspended
- (I) Ineligible
- (W) Walk-on
- Injured
- Current redshirt

== Schedule and results ==
Date time, TV	Rank^{#}	Opponent^{#}	Result	Record	Site city, state
Dec 1, 1973		Wilmington	W 87-55	1–0	WSU PE Building; Fairborn, OH
Dec 4, 1973		at Miami Ohio	L 69-79	1–1	Millett Assembly Hall; Oxford, Ohio
Dec 8, 1973		Heidelberg	W 73-54	2–1	WSU PE Building; Fairborn, OH
Dec 12, 1973		at Cincinnati	L 42-78	2–2	UC Armory; Cincinnati, OH
Dec 15, 1973		at Cumberland	L 67-81	2–3	Lebanon, TN
Dec 20, 1973		at Marietta	W 76-58	3–3	
Dec 12, 1973		Berea	W 87-56	4–3	WSU PE Building; Fairborn, OH
Dec 28, 1973		vs. Adrian; Colonel City Classic	W 81-64	5–3	Wertheimer Field House; Gambier, OH
Dec 29, 1973		vs. Bluffton; Colonel City Classic	W 62-60	6–3	Wertheimer Field House; Gambier, OH
Jan 3, 1974		Northern Kentucky	W 92-59	7–3	WSU PE Building; Fairborn, OH
Jan 5, 1974		Urbana	W 83-59	8–3	WSU PE Building; Fairborn, OH
Jan 10, 1974		at Stetson	L 61-64	8–4	Deland Armory; DeLand, Florida
Jan 12, 1974		at Rollins	L 77-84	8–5	Enyart-Alumni; Winter Park, Florida
Jan 16, 1974		at Kent State	L 78-87	8–6	Memorial Gymnasium; Kent, Ohio
Jan 19, 1974		at Rio Grande	W 79-69	9–6	Lyne Physical Education Center; Rio Grande, OH
Jan 21, 1974		Cleveland State	W 69-45	10–6	WSU PE Building; Fairborn, OH
Jan 26, 1974		at Otterbein	L 64-70	10–7	Alumni Gym; Westerville, Ohio
Feb 2, 1974		at Franklin	W 46-45	11–7	Franklin, Indiana
Feb 7, 1974		Marian (IN)	L 82-88	11–8	Naval Armory; Indianapolis
Feb 13, 1974		Tiffin	W 92-58	12–8	WSU PE Building; Fairborn, OH
Feb 16, 1974		Wilberforce	W 120-55	13-8	WSU PE Building; Fairborn, OH
Feb 20, 1974		Bellarmine	W 99-75	14–8	WSU PE Building; Fairborn, OH
Feb 23, 1974		at Rose-Hulman	W 90-77 ^{OT}	15–8	Shook Memorial; Terre Haute, Indiana
Feb 26, 1974		Thomas Moore	W 80-68	16–8	WSU PE Building; Fairborn, OH
March 2, 1974		at Cedarville	W 102-75	17-8	WSU PE Building; Fairborn, OH
*Non-conference game. ^{#}Rankings from AP Poll. (#) Tournament seedings in parentheses. MW=Midwest.

== Statistics ==
Number	Name	Games	Average	Points	Rebounds
30	Bob Grote	25	14.2	357	127
21	Bill Fogt	25	12.4	311	139
10	Rick Martin	25	11.6	291	49
20	Lyle Falknor	25	10.9	272	124
23	Tim Walker	25	10.3	259	67
25	Jim Minch	25	10.0	251	222
31	Dan Swain	25	3.4	85	94
32	Jim Cunningham	24	2.9	69	68
23	Greg McCurdy	24	2.1	51	47
14	Phil McKee	11	1.3	14	7
11	Jim Hough	11	0.8	4	5
13	Dan Brinkman	4	0.5	2	2
12	Neil Reif	2	0.0	0	1
24	Mike Herr	2	0.0	0	3

== Awards ==
Jim Minch	MVP
Rick Martin	Raider Award
