= Ralph Underhill =

American basketball coach (1941–2011)

Biographical details
- Born: August 12, 1941; Erlanger, Kentucky, U.S.
- Died: September 8, 2011 (aged 70); Cincinnati, Ohio, U.S.
- Education: Tennessee Tech

Coaching career (HC unless noted)
- 1978–1996: Wright State

Head coaching record
- Overall: 356–162 (.687)

Accomplishments and honors

Championships
- 1983 NCAA Division II National Champions

Ralph W. Underhill (August 8, 1941 – September 8, 2011) was an American college basketball coach, known for leading the Wright State Raiders men's basketball team for 18 seasons.

== Education ==
Underhill graduated from Lloyd High School in Erlanger, Kentucky, where he lettered four times each in basketball, football, track, and baseball. He then played collegiate basketball and ran track for Tennessee Tech. As a junior, he was a member of the team that won the Ohio Valley Conference championship.

He received a Bachelor of Science degree in health and physical education from Tennessee Tech in 1964 and earned a Master of Arts degree in guidance and education in 1965 from Western Kentucky University, where he worked as a graduate assistant basketball coach.

== Coaching career ==
=== Early years ===
Underhill was the head coach at Ohio County High School in Hartford, Kentucky and at Louisville Manual High School. His first collegiate coaching job was as an assistant coach under Ron Shumate at the University of Tennessee at Chattanooga.

=== Wright State ===
Underhill was the most successful coach in Wright State history, with a career total of 356 wins, including leading the team to an NCAA Division II National Championship in the 1982–83 season.

Hired as head coach for the 1978–79 season, Underhill led the Raiders for 18 seasons. Including the national championship, his squads earned a total of seven Division II regional appearances before taking Wright State up to the Division I level in 1987–88.

He was recognized with three Great Lakes Region Coach of the Year awards and one Division II Coach of the Year award. Known for being a strong recruiter, Underhill had several All-Americans at Wright State: Roman Welch (1980), Rodney Benson (1981) Gary Monroe (1983), Fred Moore (1984), Mark Vest (1985 and 1986), Grant Marion (1986) and Andy Warner (1986), and one player selected in the NBA draft (Vitaly Potapenko, 1996).

His 1993 team, led by star Bill Edwards, won the Mid-Continent Conference Tournament title against the University of Illinois at Chicago and advanced to the NCAA Division I men's basketball tournament as a 16-seed matched against Bobby Knight and the 1-seed Indiana Hoosiers. That year's IU team included Calbert Cheaney and Knight's son Pat Knight.

== Yearly records ==
Record table
Season	Team	Overall	Conference	Standing	Postseason
Wright State Raiders (Division II Independent) (1978–1987)
1978–79	Wright State	20–8			NCAA D-II regional final
1979–80	Wright State	25–3			NCAA D-II Regional semifinal
1980–81	Wright State	25–4			NCAA D-II Regional semifinal
1981–82	Wright State	22–7			NCAA D-II Regional semifinal
1982–83	Wright State	28–4			NCAA D-II National Champions
1983–84	Wright State	19–9			
1984–85	Wright State	22–7			NCAA D-II regional final
1985–86	Wright State	28–3			NCAA D-II regional final
1986–87	Wright State	20–8			
Wright State Raiders (Division I Independent) (1987–1991)
1987–88	Wright State	16–11			
1988–89	Wright State	17–11			
1989–90	Wright State	21–7			
1990–91	Wright State	19–9			
Wright State Raiders (Mid-Continent Conference) (1991–1994)
1991–92	Wright State	15–13	9–7	T–4th	
1992–93	Wright State	20–10	10–6	T–2nd	NCAA round of 64
1993–94	Wright State	12–18	9–9	T–4th	
Wright State Raiders (Midwestern Collegiate Conference) (1994–1996)
1994–95	Wright State	13–17	6–8	8th	
1995–96	Wright State	14–13	8–8	4th	
Total:		356–162 (.687)			
National champion Postseason invitational champion Conference regular season champion Conference regular season and conference tournament champion Division regular season champion Division regular season and conference tournament champion Conference tournament champion

== Halls of Fame ==
- Mary and Al Schwarz Wright State Athletic Hall of Fame in 2003
- Cincinnati Area Basketball Hall of Fame in 1997
