= 1974–75 Wright State Raiders men's basketball team =

American college basketball season

1974–75 Wright State Raiders men's basketball
- Conference: Independent
- Record: 15–10
- Head coach: John Ross (5th season)
- Assistant coaches: Jim Brown; Ray Ridenour
- Home arena: WSU PE Building

The 1974–75 Wright State Raiders men's basketball team, led by head coach John Ross, represented Wright State University in the 1974-75 NCAA Division II men's basketball season. They played their home games at the Wright State Physical Education Building in Fairborn, OH.

== Previous season ==
The 1973-74 Raiders won 17 games for the second year in a row. Their second winning season firmly established the WSU PE Building as a tough court to visit.

== Season summary ==
The 1974–75 squad concluded the John Ross era with a third straight winning season.

== Roster ==
1974–75 Wright State Raiders men's basketball team
Players
Coaches

Pos.	#	Name	Height	Weight	Year	Previous school	Hometown
G	12	Dan Brinkman	6 ft 3 in (1.91 m)	170 lb (77 kg)	Jr	Alter	Kettering, Ohio
F/C	25	Jim Cunningham	6 ft 8 in (2.03 m)	206 lb (93 kg)	Sr	Alter	Miamisburg, Ohio
F	20	Lyle Falknor	6 ft 5 in (1.96 m)	195 lb (88 kg)	Jr	New Madison	New Madison, Ohio
F	15	Bob Grote (C)	6 ft 4 in (1.93 m)	205 lb (93 kg)	Jr	Elder	Cincinnati, Ohio
F	24	Mike Herr	6 ft 5 in (1.96 m)	190 lb (86 kg)	Jr	Elder	Cincinnati, Ohio
G	11	Jim Hough	6 ft 1 in (1.85 m)	160 lb (73 kg)	So	Springboro	Springboro, Ohio
F	22	Doug Jemison	6 ft 7 in (2.01 m)	172 lb (78 kg)	Fr	Middletown	Middletown, Ohio
C	30	Sam Kilburn	6 ft 10 in (2.08 m)	210 lb (95 kg)	Jr	Stebbins	Dayton, Ohio
G	10	Rick Martin (C)	5 ft 9 in (1.75 m)	145 lb (66 kg)	Jr	Middletown	Middletown, Ohio
C	23	Ken Millisor (injured)	6 ft 7 in (2.01 m)	185 lb (84 kg)	So	Fairfield Union	Bremen, Ohio
G/F	21	Neil Reif	6 ft 5 in (1.96 m)	200 lb (91 kg)	So	Indian Hill	Cincinnati, Ohio
F	32	Steve Shook	6 ft 6 in (1.98 m)	196 lb (89 kg)	Jr	Acton	Centerville, Ohio
C	31	Dan Swain	6 ft 9 in (2.06 m)	223 lb (101 kg)	Sr	Beavercreek	Beavercreek, Ohio

Head coach

- John Ross (Wilmington)

Assistant coach(es)

Jim Brown (Dayton), Ray Ridenour (Georgia Tech)

Legend

- (C) Team captain
- (S) Suspended
- (I) Ineligible
- (W) Walk-on
- Injured
- Current redshirt

== Schedule and results ==
Date time, TV	Rank^{#}	Opponent^{#}	Result	Record	Site city, state
Nov 30, 1974		at Cincinnati	L 71-89	0–1	UC Armory; Cincinnati, OH
Dec 4, 1974		Tiffin	W 92-57	1–1	WSU PE Building; Fairborn, OH
Dec 7, 1974		at Miami Ohio	L 61-85	1–2	Millett Assembly Hall; Oxford, Ohio
Dec 14, 1974		Heidelberg	W 65-59	2–2	WSU PE Building; Fairborn, OH
Dec 21, 1974		Indiana Southeast	W 74-53	3–2	WSU PE Building; Fairborn, OH
Dec 27, 1974		vs. Ohio Northern; Colonel City Classic	W 44-37	4–2	Wertheimer Field House; Gambier, OH
Dec 28, 1974		at Kenyon; Colonel City Classic	W 71-55	5–2	Wertheimer Field House; Gambier, OH
Jan 4, 1975		at Rice	L 83-92	5–3	Autry Court and Gym; Houston, TX
Jan 9, 1975		Cleveland State	W 58-53	6–3	WSU PE Building; Fairborn, OH
Jan 13, 1975		Wilberforce	W 78-69	7-3	WSU PE Building; Fairborn, OH
Jan 16, 1975		at Rollins	L 57-59	7–4	Enyart-Alumni; Winter Park, Florida
Jan 18, 1975		at Stetson	L 38-62	7–5	Deland Armory; DeLand, Florida
Jan 22, 1975		Northern Kentucky	W 90-76	8–5	WSU PE Building; Fairborn, OH
Jan 25, 1975		Rio Grande	W 103-80	9–5	WSU PE Building; Fairborn, OH
Jan 28, 1975		Akron	L 60-63	9–6	WSU PE Building; Fairborn, OH
Jan 30, 1975		Slippery Rock	L 79-81	9–7	WSU PE Building; Fairborn, OH
Feb 1, 1975		Franklin	W 87-60	10-7	WSU PE Building; Fairborn, OH
Feb 5, 1975		Urbana	W 82-73	11–7	College Community Center; Urbana, OH
Feb 8, 1975		at Cleveland State	L 60-75	11–8	Cleveland Public Hall; Cleveland, OH
Feb 11, 1975		Cumberland	W 88-73	12–8	WSU PE Building; Fairborn, OH
Feb 15, 1975		at Bellarmine	L 79-83 ^{OT}	12–9	Knights Hall; Louisville, Kentucky
Feb 19, 1975		at Northern Kentucky	W 80-78	13–9	Highland Heights, Kentucky
Feb 22, 1975		Central State	W 62-60	14–9	WSU PE Building; Fairborn, OH
Feb 25, 1975		at Thomas Moore	W 68-58	15–9	Covington Central High School; Covington, Kentucky
Mar 1, 1975		Indiana Southeast	L 71-76	15-10	Jeffersonville Fieldhouse; New Albany, Indiana
*Non-conference game. ^{#}Rankings from AP Poll. (#) Tournament seedings in parentheses. MW=Midwest.

== Statistics ==
Number	Name	Games	Average	Points	Rebounds
15	Bob Grote	25	17.1	428	127
20	Lyle Falknor	25	16.7	417	125
10	Rick Martin	25	13.2	331	45
32	Steve Shook	25	5.9	147	126
31	Dan Swain	25	4.8	119	106
25	Jim Cunningham	24	3.7	89	88
11	Jim Hough	25	2.8	71	32
12	Dan Brinkman	24	2.4	59	32
22	Doug Jemison	8	7.1	57	58
30	Sam Kilburn	17	2.4	40	36
24	Mike Herr	20	1.2	24	33
21	Neil Reif	14	1.3	18	22

== Awards ==
Bob Grote	MVP
Rick Martin	Raider Award
Bob Grote	Guardian Award
