= Tanner Holden =

American basketball player

No. 24 – Salt Lake City Stars
- Position: Shooting guard
- League: NBA G League

Personal information
- Born: April 6, 2000 (age 26)
- Listed height: 6 ft 6 in (1.98 m)
- Listed weight: 200 lb (91 kg)

Career information
- High school: Wheelersburg (Wheelersburg, Ohio)
- College: Wright State (2019–2022); Ohio State (2022–2023); Wright State (2023–2024)
- NBA draft: 2024: undrafted
- Playing career: 2024–present

Career history
- 2024–2025: Texas Legends
- 2026–present: Salt Lake City Stars

Career highlights
- 2× First-team All-Horizon League (2021, 2022); Third-team All-Horizon League (2024); Horizon League All-Freshman Team (2020)

Tanner Holden (born April 6, 2000) is an American professional basketball player for the Salt Lake City Stars of the NBA G League. He played college basketball for the Wright State Raiders and the Ohio State Buckeyes.

== Early life and high school career ==
Holden attended Wheelersburg High School where he played football and basketball. He was a wide receiver on the gridiron and was an Ohio Mr. Football finalist in 2017. As a junior, he averaged 18 points and 11 rebounds per game while earning first-team Division III all-state honors. Holden averaged 27.0 points per game as a senior and repeated on the first-team. He was an unranked prospect according to 247Sports and committed to play college basketball at Wright State.

== College career ==
As a freshman, Holden averaged 11.8 points and 6.5 rebounds per game and was named to the Horizon League All-Freshman team. He averaged 15.8 points and 7.3 rebounds per game as a sophomore to earn first-team all-Horizon League honors. As a junior, Holden averaged 20 points and seven rebounds per game, earning first-team All-Horizon League honors. He led the team to the NCAA tournament and scored 37 points in a First Four win against Bryant. Following the season, Holden transferred to Ohio State. He averaged 3.6 points and 2.4 rebounds per game as a senior. For his final season of eligibility, Holden returned to Wright State. He averaged 16.3 points, 6.4 rebounds, 3.6 assists and 1.8 steals per game.

== Professional career ==
After going undrafted in the 2024 NBA draft, Holden joined the Sioux Falls Skyforce on October 28, 2024, after a tryout. However, he was waived on November 4 and on December 29, he joined the Texas Legends. Holden was traded to the Salt Lake City Stars on October 13, 2026.
