= 1990–91 Wright State Raiders men's basketball team =

American college basketball season

1990–91 Wright State Raiders men's basketball
- Conference: Independent
- Record: 19–9
- Head coach: Ralph Underhill (13th season)
- Assistant coaches: Jim Brown; Jim Ehler; Jeff Dillon; Jack Butler
- Home arena: Nutter Center

1990–91 NCAA Division I men's basketball independents standings
	Conf.				Overall
Team	W		L	PCT	W		L	PCT
No. 24 DePaul	-	–	-	–	20	–	9	.690
Wright State	-	–	-	–	19	–	9	.679
Milwaukee	-	–	-	–	18	–	10	.643
Southern Utah	-	–	-	–	16	–	12	.571
Missouri–Kansas City	-	–	-	–	15	–	14	.517
Youngstown State	-	–	-	–	12	–	16	.429
Brooklyn	-	–	-	–	11	–	16	.407
Notre Dame	-	–	-	–	12	–	20	.375
Miami (FL)	-	–	-	–	9	–	19	.321
Southeastern Louisiana	-	–	-	–	9	–	19	.321
Cal State Northridge	-	–	-	–	8	–	20	.286
Florida International	-	–	-	–	6	–	22	.214
Liberty	-	–	-	–	5	–	23	.179
Chicago State	-	–	-	–	4	–	24	.143
Nicholls State	-	–	-	–	3	–	25	.107
Northeastern Illinois	-	–	-	–	2	–	25	.074
US International	-	–	-	–	2	–	26	.071
Rankings from AP Poll

The 1990–91 Wright State Raiders men's basketball team represented Wright State University in the 1990–91 NCAA Division I men's basketball season led by head coach Ralph Underhill.

== Season summary ==
For the 1990–91 season, Wright State began play in the Ervin J. Nutter Center. Originally built in a bowl configuration, the huge arena put the fans on top of the action. This was particularly true for the students and band in the moveable metal bleachers in section 200 along the baseline.

== Roster ==
1990–91 Wright State Raiders men's basketball team
Players
Coaches

Pos.	#	Name	Height	Weight	Year	Previous school	Hometown
F/C	44	Scott Benton	6 ft 9 in (2.06 m)	220 lb (100 kg)	RS Sr	Walton-Verona	Union, KY
F	32	Dave Dinn	6 ft 6 in (1.98 m)	215 lb (98 kg)	RS Sr	Boone County	Florence, KY
G/F	21	Rob Haucke	6 ft 5 in (1.96 m)	195 lb (88 kg)	Jr	Oak Hills	Cincinnati, OH
G	20	Marc Mumphrey	6 ft 1 in (1.85 m)	185 lb (84 kg)	Jr	Carroll County	Carrollton, KY
PG	22	Mark Woods	6 ft 1 in (1.85 m)	145 lb (66 kg)	Jr	Pleasure Ridge	Louisville, KY
F	42	Bill Edwards	6 ft 8 in (2.03 m)	215 lb (98 kg)	So	Carlisle	Middletown, OH
F/C	41	Mike Haley II	6 ft 9 in (2.06 m)	220 lb (100 kg)	So	Dunbar	Dayton, OH
F	33	Sean Hammonds	6 ft 5 in (1.96 m)	220 lb (100 kg)	So	Pleasure Ridge Park	Louisville, KY
C	52	Mike Nahar (redshirt)	7 ft 0 in (2.13 m)	208 lb (94 kg)	So	Dutch National Jr. Team	Alkmaar
G	24	Renaldo O'Neal	6 ft 4 in (1.93 m)	190 lb (86 kg)	So	Dunbar	Dayton, OH
F	43	Dan Skeoch	6 ft 7 in (2.01 m)	210 lb (95 kg)	So	Anderson	Anderson, IN
F	40	Jeff Unverferth	6 ft 7 in (2.01 m)	225 lb (102 kg)	RS So	Worthington	Worthington, OH
G	30	Andy Holderman	6 ft 1 in (1.85 m)	160 lb (73 kg)	Fr	Manchester	North Manchester, IN
G	23	Scott Blair	6 ft 1 in (1.85 m)	160 lb (73 kg)	Fr	Westerville North	Westerville, OH

Head coach

- Ralph Underhill

Assistant coach(es)

Jim Brown, Jim Ehler, Jeff Dillon, Jack Butler

Legend

- (C) Team captain
- (S) Suspended
- (I) Ineligible
- (W) Walk-on
- Injured
- Current redshirt

== Schedule and results ==
Date time, TV	Rank^{#}	Opponent^{#}	Result	Record	Site city, state
Regular season
Nov 24, 1990		vs. Coastal Carolina; North Coast Tournament	L 69–83	0–1	Public Hall; Cleveland, OH
Nov 25, 1990		at Cleveland State; North Coast Tournament	L 92–99	0–2	Public Hall; Cleveland, OH
Dec 1, 1990		Middle Tennessee State	W 88–86	1–2	Nutter Center; Fairborn, OH
Dec 5, 1990		St. Joseph’s (IN)	W 103–67	2–2	Nutter Center; Fairborn, OH
Dec 8, 1990		at Central Michigan	L 85–112	2–3	Rose Arena; Mount Pleasant, MI
Dec 12, 1990		at No. 8 Ohio State	L 60–90	2–4	St. John Arena; Columbus, OH
Dec 15, 1990		at Youngstown State	W 109–94	3–4	Beeghly Center; Youngstown, OH
Dec 21, 1990		Stephen F. Austin; USAir Classic	W 90–83	4–4	Nutter Center; Fairborn, OH
Dec 22, 1990		Murray State; USAir Classic	W 79–76	5–4	Nutter Center; Fairborn, OH
Jan 2, 1991		at Ohio	W 79–76	5–5	Reilly Center (2,877); Athens, OH
Jan 5, 1991		at UMKC	W 98–90	6–5	Swinney Recreation Center; Kansas City, MO
Jan 12, 1991		Milwaukee	W 84–79	7–5	Nutter Center; Fairborn, OH
Jan 16, 1991		at Bowling Green	L 74–87	7–6	Anderson Arena; Bowling Green, OH
Jan 19, 1991		UMKC	W 101–90	8–6	Nutter Center; Fairborn, OH
Jan 23, 1991		Texas Southern	W 99–87	9–6	Nutter Center; Fairborn, OH
Jan 26, 1991		Southern Utah	W 96–93	10–6	Nutter Center; Fairborn, OH
Jan 26, 1991		Prairie View A&M	W 123–93	11–6	Nutter Center; Fairborn, OH
Feb 2, 1991		Kent State	W 62–61	12–6	Nutter Center; Fairborn, OH
Feb 9, 1991		at Southern Utah	W 109–105	13–6	America First Event Center; Cedar City, UT
Feb 11, 1991		at Prairie View A&M	W 100–86	14–6	William J. Nicks Building; Prairie View, TX
Feb 13, 1991		at Texas Southern	L 82–97	14–7	Health and Physical Education Arena; Houston, TX
Feb 16, 1991		Chicago State	W 128–96	15–7	Nutter Center; Fairborn, OH
Feb 19, 1991		Xavier	W 91–83	16–7	Nutter Center; Fairborn, OH
Feb 19, 1991		Central State	L 91–94	16–8	Nutter Center; Fairborn, OH
Feb 28, 1991		at Milwaukee	L 89–106	16–9	Baker Fieldhouse; Milwaukee, WI
Mar 2, 1991		at Chicago State	W 117–106	17–9	Physical Education and Athletic Building; Chicago, IL
Mar 5, 1991		Youngstown State	W 107–71	18–9	Nutter Center; Fairborn, OH
Mar 10, 1991		Northeastern Illinois	W 112–91	19–9	Nutter Center; Fairborn, OH
*Non-conference game. ^{#}Rankings from AP Poll. (#) Tournament seedings in parentheses. MW=Midwest.

== Awards and honors ==
Bill Edwards	MVP
Mark Woods	MVP
Sean Hammonds	Raider Award

== Statistics ==
Number	Name	Games	Average	Points	Assists	Rebounds
42	Bill Edwards	28	18.9	528	34	201
20	Marcus Mumphrey	28	16.6	466	71	68
33	Sean Hammonds	28	12.9	361	58	198
22	Mark Woods	28	12.0	336	206	113
41	Mike Haley II	28	9.8	273	21	137
44	Scott Benton	28	6.6	186	44	98
40	Jeff Unverferth	28	6.4	179	14	71
24	Renaldo O'Neal	28	4.1	115	81	58
32	Dave Dinn	18	3.2	57	10	37
21	Rob Haucke	23	2.3	52	13	20
30	Andy Holderman	21	1.6	33	16	9
23	Scott Blair	7	1.1	8	4	2
43	Dan Skeoch	2	0.0	0	0	2
