= Vernard Hollins =

American basketball player

Personal information
- Born: November 23, 1980 (age 45) Fort Wayne, Indiana
- Listed height: 6 ft 3 in (1.91 m)
- Listed weight: 210 lb (95 kg)

Career information
- High school: North Side (Fort Wayne, Indiana)
- College: Wright State (2000–2004)
- NBA draft: 2004: undrafted
- Playing career: 2004–2015
- Position: Guard

Career history
- 2004–2005: Rabotnički
- 2005: Pioneros de Los Mochis
- 2005–2006: Braunschweig
- 2006–2008: Szolnoki Olaj
- 2008–2009: Hermine de Nantes Atlantique
- 2009–2011: Starwings Basket Regio Basel
- 2011–2012: Oberwart Gunners
- 2014: Union Neuchâtel Basket
- 2014–2015: Basket-club Boncourt

Vernard Hollins (born November 23, 1980) is a former American professional basketball player who last played for Basket-club Boncourt.
