= 1976–77 Wright State Raiders men's basketball team =

American college basketball season

1976–77 Wright State Raiders men's basketball
- Conference: Independent
- Record: 11–16
- Head coach: Marcus Jackson (2nd season)
- Assistant coaches: Jerry Holbrook; Jim Brown
- Home arena: WSU PE Building

The 1976–77 Wright State Raiders men's basketball team represented Wright State University in the 1976–77 NCAA NCAA Division II men's basketball season led by head coach Marcus Jackson.

== Season summary ==
Coach Marcus Jackson's second season was hard-fought, but a disappointing follow-up to the school's first 20 win season and tournament bid the previous year.

== Roster ==
1976–77 Wright State Raiders men's basketball team
Players
Coaches

Pos.	#	Name	Height	Weight	Year	Hometown
G	32	Neil Reif	6 ft 4 in (1.93 m)	190 lb (86 kg)	Sr	Indian Hill	Cincinnati, Ohio
F	43	Curt Shellabarger (C)	6 ft 7 in (2.01 m)	206 lb (93 kg)	Sr	Celina	Celina, Ohio
G	34	Mark Hall	6 ft 4 in (1.93 m)	180 lb (82 kg)	Jr	Jefferson	Dayton, Ohio
F/C	42	Ken Millisor	6 ft 7 in (2.01 m)	208 lb (94 kg)	Jr	Fairfield Union	Bremen, Ohio
G	20	Rick Poole	6 ft 1 in (1.85 m)	170 lb (77 kg)	Jr	Patterson	Dayton, Ohio
G	23	Rick Zink	6 ft 2 in (1.88 m)	170 lb (77 kg)	Jr	Charminade-Julienne	Dayton, Ohio
C	44	Guy Conners	6 ft 8 in (2.03 m)	210 lb (95 kg)	So	Amelia	Amelia, Ohio
G	22	Bob Cook	6 ft 4 in (1.93 m)	175 lb (79 kg)	So	Miamisburg	Miamisburg, Ohio
F	33	Dan Huguely	6 ft 8 in (2.03 m)	190 lb (86 kg)	So	Rossevelt	Dayton, Ohio
G	23	Alan McGee	6 ft 1 in (1.85 m)	173 lb (78 kg)	So	North Side	Fort Wayne, Indiana
F	25	Robert Pounds	6 ft 5 in (1.96 m)	185 lb (84 kg)	So	Eastmoor	Columbus, Ohio
F/C	35	Bob Shaefer	6 ft 7 in (2.01 m)	208 lb (94 kg)	So	Alter	Kettering, Ohio
F	40	Bob Fitzpatrick	6 ft 5 in (1.96 m)	198 lb (90 kg)	Fr	Mt. Healthy	Cincinnati, Ohio
F	30	Bill Wilson	6 ft 2 in (1.88 m)	160 lb (73 kg)	Fr	Eastmoor	Columbus, Ohio
F	45	Greg Bills	6 ft 6 in (1.98 m)	205 lb (93 kg)	Fr	Centerville	Centerville, Ohio

Head coach

- Marcus Jackson

Assistant coach(es)

Jerry Holbrook, Jim Brown

Legend

- (C) Team captain
- (S) Suspended
- (I) Ineligible
- (W) Walk-on
- Injured
- Current redshirt

== Schedule and results ==
Date time, TV	Rank^{#}	Opponent^{#}	Result	Record	Site city, state
Regular season
Nov 26, 1976		Slippery Rock; Wright State Invitational	L 75-77	0–1	WSU PE Building; Fairborn, OH
Nov 27, 1976		Western Illinois; Wright State Invitational	W 90-82	1–1	WSU PE Building; Fairborn, OH
Nov 29, 1976		IUPUI	L 84-89	1–2	WSU PE Building; Fairborn, OH
Dec 1, 1976		at No. 12 Cincinnati	L 52-120	1–3	UC Armory; Cincinnati, OH
Dec 4, 1976		Northern Kentucky	L 56-62	1–4	WSU PE Building; Fairborn, OH
Dec 8, 1976		Miami Ohio	L 54-67	1–5	WSU PE Building; Fairborn, OH
Dec 11, 1976		Marian (IN)	W 55-52	2-5	Naval Armory; Indianapolis
Dec 13, 1976		Indianapolis	W 80-68	3–5	WSU PE Building; Fairborn, OH
Dec 15, 1976		at Akron	L 59-71 ^{forfeit}	4–5	Memorial Hall; Akron, OH
Dec 20, 1976		at North Dakota	L 58-67	4–6	University of North Dakota Field House; Grand Forks, North Dakota
Jan 4, 1977		Northeastern Illinois	W 98-96 ^{3OT}	5–6	WSU PE Building; Fairborn, OH
Jan 8, 1977		Chicago State	W 103-69	6–6	WSU PE Building; Fairborn, OH
Jan 12, 1977		at Northern Kentucky	L 62-81	6-7	Regents Hall; Highland Heights, Kentucky
Jan 15, 1977		Armstrong State	W 83-81	7-7	WSU PE Building; Fairborn, OH
Jan 17, 1977		at Milwaukee	L 66-75	7-8	Baker Fieldhouse; Milwaukee, WI
Jan 22, 1977		Wisconsin-Parkside	L 64-69	7-9	WSU PE Building; Fairborn, OH
Jan 24, 1977		Robert Morris	W 80-76	8-9	WSU PE Building; Fairborn, OH
Jan 27, 1977		at Cleveland State	W 77-56	9-9	Public Hall; Cleveland, OH
Jan 29, 1977		at Youngstown State	L 71-73	9-10	Beeghly Center; Youngstown, OH
Jan 31, 1977		Eastern Illinois	L 61-74	9-11	WSU PE Building; Fairborn, OH
Feb 5, 1977		at VCU (Virginia Commonwealth)	L 70-82	9-12	Franklin Street Gym; Richmond, Virginia
Feb 9, 1977		Franklin	W 77-67	10-12	WSU PE Building; Fairborn, OH
Feb 12, 1977		at Bellarmine	L 85-88	10–13	Knights Hall; Louisville, Kentucky
Feb 14, 1977		Cleveland State	L 67-74	10-14	WSU PE Building; Fairborn, OH
Feb 19, 1977		at Kentucky State	L 69-74	10-15	Capital Sports Center; Frankfort, Kentucky
Feb 23, 1977		Akron	W 93-79	11–15	WSU PE Building; Fairborn, OH
Feb 26, 1977		at Eastern Illinois	L 55-62	11-16	Lantz Fieldhouse; Charleston, Illinois
*Non-conference game. ^{#}Rankings from AP Poll. (#) Tournament seedings in parentheses. MW=Midwest.

== Awards and honors ==
Bob Schaefer	MVP
Bob Cook	Raider Award

== Statistics ==
Number	Name	Games	Average	Points	Rebounds
35	Bob Schaefer	27	16.9	456	196
43	Curt Shellabarger	27	12.0	269	210
33	Dan Huguely	27	9.7	262	130
23	Alan McGee	27	9.2	249	96
22	Bob Cook	26	8.5	222	73
30	Bill Wilson	26	5.3	139	42
25	Bob Pounds	21	5.6	118	54
34	Mark Hall	21	4.4	93	80
40	Joe Fitzpatrick	16	2.5	40	37
32	Neil Reif	22	1.4	30	15
44	Guy Conners	16	1.6	26	10
20	Rick Poole	22	1.2	26	26
24	Rick Zink	12	1.2	14	12
45	Greg Bills	1	0.0	0	0
