= 1972–73 Wright State Raiders men's basketball team =

American college basketball season

1972–73 Wright State Raiders men's basketball
- Conference: Independent
- Record: 17–5
- Head coach: John Ross (3rd season)
- Assistant coaches: Jim Brown; Ray Ridenour
- Home arena: Stebbins High School, WSU PE Building

The 1972–73 Wright State Raiders men's basketball team, led by head coach John Ross, represented Wright State University in the 1972-73 NCAA College Division men's basketball season. This was the final season for playing home games at Stebbins High School in Riverside, Ohio, and the first to use the new Physical Education Building on campus.

== Previous season ==
The 1971-72 team went 9–17 in Wright State's sophomore varsity season.

== Season summary ==
The Raiders soared to their first winning season, finishing 17–5 in just the third year of varsity basketball.

== Roster ==
1972–73 Wright State Raiders men's basketball team
Players
Coaches

Pos.	#	Name	Height	Weight	Year	Previous school	Hometown
G	10	Rick Martin	5 ft 10 in (1.78 m)	155 lb (70 kg)	Fr	Middletown	Middletown, Ohio
G	11	Phil McKee	6 ft 0 in (1.83 m)	175 lb (79 kg)	So	Shawnee	Lima, Ohio
G	12	Fred Clark	6 ft 2 in (1.88 m)	178 lb (81 kg)	Jr	Roosevelt	Dayton, Ohio
G	13	Dan Brinkman	6 ft 2 in (1.88 m)	175 lb (79 kg)	Fr	Alter	Dayton, Ohio
F	14	Bill Marras	6 ft 4 in (1.93 m)	190 lb (86 kg)	So	Fairmont West	Kettering, Ohio
F	20	Lyle Falknor	6 ft 5 in (1.96 m)	158 lb (72 kg)	Fr	New Madison	New Madison, Ohio
F	21	Bill Fogt	6 ft 3 in (1.91 m)	185 lb (84 kg)	Jr	Piqua	Piqua, Ohio
C	22	Greg McCurdy	6 ft 7 in (2.01 m)	200 lb (91 kg)	Jr	Centerville	Centerville, Ohio
G	23	Tim Walker	6 ft 2 in (1.88 m)	180 lb (82 kg)	Jr	Centerville	Centerville, Ohio
F	24	Mike Herr	6 ft 4 in (1.93 m)	185 lb (84 kg)	Fr	Elder	Cincinnati, Ohio
F	25	Jim Minch	6 ft 6 in (1.98 m)	190 lb (86 kg)	Jr	Carroll	Dayton, Ohio
F	30	Bob Grote	6 ft 3 in (1.91 m)	190 lb (86 kg)	Fr	Elder	Cincinnati, Ohio
C	31	Dan Swain	6 ft 8 in (2.03 m)	205 lb (93 kg)	So	Beavercreek	Beavercreek, Ohio
F	32	John Lucas	6 ft 6 in (1.98 m)	208 lb (94 kg)	So	Fairmont East	Kettering, Ohio

Head coach

- John Ross (Wilmington)

Assistant coach(es)

Jim Brown (Dayton), Ray Ridenour(Georgia Tech)

Legend

- (C) Team captain
- (S) Suspended
- (I) Ineligible
- (W) Walk-on
- Injured
- Current redshirt

== Schedule and results ==
Date time, TV	Rank^{#}	Opponent^{#}	Result	Record	Site city, state
Regular season
Dec 2, 1972		at Kenyon	W 64-57	1-0	Wertheimer Field House; Gambier, Ohio
Dec 6, 1972		at Ohio Northern	W 91-87	2–0	Taft Gymnasium; Ada, OH
Dec 15, 1972		vs. Miami Ohio	L 59-84	2–1	UD Arena; Dayton, Ohio
Dec 20, 1972		at Marietta	W 68-63 ^{OT}	3–1	Ban Johnson Fieldhouse; Marietta, Ohio
Dec 22, 1972		at Cleveland State	W 52-48	4–1	Public Hall; Cleveland, OH
Dec 27, 1972		vs. Denison; Colonel City Classic	W 72-58	5–1	Wertheimer Field House; Gambier, OH
Dec 28, 1972		at Kenyon; Colonel City Classic	W 64-57	6-1	Wertheimer Field House; Gambier, Ohio
Jan 4, 1973		Thomas Moore	W 78-70	7–1	Stebbins High School; Riverside, OH
Jan 16, 1973		Rio Grande	W 65-64	8–1	Xenia High School; Xenia, OH
Jan 19, 1973		vs. Principia; Rose-Hulman Invitational	L 80-82 ^{2OT}	8–2	Shook Memorial; Terre Haute, Indiana
Jan 20, 1973		at Rose-Hulman; Rose-Hulman Invitational	W 79-61	9–2	Shook Memorial; Terre Haute, Indiana
Jan 26, 1973		Otterbein	L 70-74 ^{OT}	9-3	WSU PE Building; Fairborn, OH
Jan 30, 1973		Cumberland	L 76-81	9–4	Xenia High School; Xenia, OH
Feb 3, 1973		Ohio Northern	W 68-47	10-4	Stebbins High School; Riverside, OH
Feb 7, 1973		Marian (IN)	W 91-68	11–4	Stebbins High School; Riverside, OH
Feb 10, 1973		at Berea	L 74-80	11–5	Seaburg Gym; Berea, KY
Feb 13, 1973		Wilberforce	W 100-69	12-5	WSU PE Building; Fairborn, OH
Feb 17, 1973		Rose-Hulman	W 81-60	13–5	WSU PE Building; Fairborn, OH
Feb 19, 1973		Tiffin	W 81-67	14–5	WSU PE Building; Fairborn, OH
Feb 23, 1973		Northern Kentucky	W 78-69	15–5	WSU PE Building; Fairborn, OH
Feb 28, 1973		at Thomas Moore	W 71-70	16–5	Covington Central High School; Crestview Hills, Kentucky
March 3, 1973		at Cedarville	W 89-78	17-5	Gym-Student Center; Cedarville, OH
*Non-conference game. ^{#}Rankings from AP Poll. (#) Tournament seedings in parentheses. MW=Midwest.

== Statistics ==
Number	Name	Games	Average	Points	Rebounds
20	Lyle Falknor	21	15.7	331	143
23	Tim Walker	21	14.3	302	88
10	Rick Martin	22	10.9	240	74
21	Bill Fogt	21	10.5	221	172
25	Jim Minch	22	10.3	229	221
30	Bob Grote	21	6.7	142	108
20	Dan Swain	20	3.7	74	67
32	John Lucas	19	2.3	44	36
23	Greg McCurdy	18	1.9	35	29
11	Phil McKee	13	2.0	27	13
24	Mike Herr	3	1.4	7	3
14	Bill Marras	7	0.2	2	3
13	Dan Brinkman	13	0.1	2	7

== Awards ==
Jim Minch	MVP
Rick Martin	Raider Award
Jim Minch	Guardian Award
