= 1980–81 Wright State Raiders men's basketball team =

American college basketball season

1980–81 Wright State Raiders men's basketball

NCAA tournament, 3rd Place Great Lakes Regional
- Conference: Independent
- Record: 25–4
- Head coach: Ralph Underhill (3rd season)
- Assistant coaches: Jim Brown; Bob Grote
- Home arena: WSU PE Building

The 1980–81 Wright State Raiders men's basketball team represented Wright State University in the 1980–81 NCAA NCAA Division II men's basketball season led by head coach Ralph Underhill.

== Season summary ==
Expectations were high for 1980–81 as the 80s began with an upgraded schedule. Results were equally as high, producing a 24–3 regular season with the only disappointment being a fourth early NCAA tournament exit.

== Roster ==
1980–81 Wright State Raiders men's basketball team
Players
Coaches

| Pos. | # | Name | Height | Weight | Year | Previous school | Hometown |
|---|---|---|---|---|---|---|---|
| F | 24 | Rodney Benson | 6 ft 6 in (1.98 m) | 195 lb (88 kg) | Sr | Cleveland St. (TN) | Louisville, Kentucky |
| F | 25 | Jeff Bragg | 6 ft 5 in (1.96 m) | 180 lb (82 kg) | Sr | Marion | Marion, Indiana |
| G | 34 | Eddie Crowe | 6 ft 1 in (1.85 m) | 170 lb (77 kg) | Sr | Carlisle | Carlisle, Ohio |
| C | 42 | Steve Hartings | 6 ft 8 in (2.03 m) | 200 lb (91 kg) | RS Sr | Marion Local | Maria Stein, Ohio |
| F | 45 | Leon Manning | 6 ft 6 in (1.98 m) | 170 lb (77 kg) | Sr | Northwest | Indianapolis |
| G | 20 | Keith Miller | 6 ft 2 in (1.88 m) | 180 lb (82 kg) | Sr | Cleveland St. (TN) | Louisville, Kentucky |
| F | 44 | Roman Welch | 6 ft 6 in (1.98 m) | 205 lb (93 kg) | Sr | S. Plantation | Ft. Lauderdale, Florida |
| G | 32 | Mike Zimmerman | 6 ft 1 in (1.85 m) | 170 lb (77 kg) | Sr | Alter | Kettering, Ohio |
| F | 23 | Tom Holzapfel | 6 ft 5 in (1.96 m) | 185 lb (84 kg) | Jr | Greenville | Greenville, Ohio |
| F | 33 | Theron Barbour | 6 ft 8 in (2.03 m) | — | Fr | Atherton | Louisville, Kentucky |
| F | | Phil Benninger | 6 ft 8 in (2.03 m) | — | Fr | New Albany | New Albany, Indiana |
| F | 30 | Mike Grote | 6 ft 1 in (1.85 m) | — | Fr | Elder | Cincinnati, Ohio |
| G | | T.C. Johnson | 6 ft 0 in (1.83 m) | — | Fr | Sidney | Sidney, Ohio |
| G | 35 | Steve Purcell | 6 ft 4 in (1.93 m) | — | Fr | Kokomo | Kokomo, Indiana |
| G | 22 | Barry Turner | 6 ft 0 in (1.83 m) | 185 lb (84 kg) | RS Fr | Wilmington | Wilmington, Ohio |

Head coach

- Ralph Underhill

Assistant coach(es)

Jim Brown, Bob Grote

Legend

- (C) Team captain
- (S) Suspended
- (I) Ineligible
- (W) Walk-on
- Injured
- Current redshirt

== Schedule and results ==
| Date time, TV | Rank^{#} | Opponent^{#} | Result | Record | Site city, state |
Regular season
| Nov 29, 1980 | | Wilberforce | W 111–72 | 1–0 | WSU PE Building; Fairborn, OH |
| Dec 1, 1980 | | Miami Ohio | W 92–84 | 2–0 | WSU PE Building; Fairborn, OH |
| Dec 3, 1980 | | Bolling Green | W 81–68 | 3–0 | WSU PE Building; Fairborn, OH |
| Dec 6, 1980 | | Wayne State | W 86–65 | 4–0 | WSU PE Building; Fairborn, OH |
| Dec 10, 1980 | | at St. Leo | W 124–77 | 5–0 | St. Leo, Florida |
| Dec 17, 1980 | | at Bellarmine | W 85–76 | 6–0 | Knights Hall; Louisville, Kentucky |
| Dec 20, 1980 | | District of Columbia | W 76–63 | 7–0 | WSU PE Building; Fairborn, OH |
| Dec 22, 1980 | | Eastern Illinois | W 81–73 | 8–0 | WSU PE Building; Fairborn, OH |
| Jan 3, 1981 | | IUPUI | W 81–61 | 9–0 | WSU PE Building; Fairborn, OH |
| Jan 7, 1981 | | at Indiana Central | W 68–61 | 10–0 | Nicoson Hall; Indianapolis |
| Jan 10, 1981 | | Marian (IN) | W 87–67 | 11–0 | WSU PE Building; Fairborn, OH |
| Jan 12, 1981 | | vs. Central State | W 72–58 | 12–0 | UD Arena; Dayton, Ohio |
| Jan 14, 1981 | | at St. Joseph’s (IN) | L 80–87 | 12–1 | Roberts Municipal Stadium; Evansville, Indiana |
| Jan 17, 1980 | | Northern Kentucky | W 90–76 | 13–1 | WSU PE Building; Fairborn, OH |
| Jan 21, 1981 | | Bellarmine | L 84–87 | 13–2 | WSU PE Building; Fairborn, OH |
| Jan 24, 1981 | | SIU Edwardsville | W 81–65 | 14–2 | WSU PE Building; Fairborn, OH |
| Jan 28, 1981 | | St. Joseph’s (IN) | W 107–79 | 15–2 | WSU PE Building; Fairborn, OH |
| Jan 31, 1981 | | at Northern Kentucky | W 107–79 | 16–2 | Regents Hall; Highland Heights, Kentucky |
| Feb 4, 1981 | | at Youngstown State | W 66–59 | 17–2 | Beeghly Center; Youngstown, OH |
| Feb 7, 1981 | | at Eastern Illinois | L 63–72 | 17–3 | Lantz Fieldhouse; Charleston, Illinois |
| Feb 10, 1981 | | vs. Central State | W 77–62 | 18–3 | UD Arena; Dayton, Ohio |
| Feb 12, 1981 | | vs. Kentucky Wesleyan | W 78–60 | 19–3 | Owensboro, Kentucky |
| Feb 18, 1981 | | Indiana Central | W 92–57 | 20–3 | WSU PE Building; Fairborn, OH |
| Feb 21, 1981 | | Siena Heights | W 86–74 | 21–3 | WSU PE Building; Fairborn, OH |
| Feb 21, 1981 | | Spring Arbor | W 101–62 | 22–3 | WSU PE Building; Fairborn, OH |
| Feb 25, 1981 | | New York Tech | W 69–61 | 23–3 | WSU PE Building; Fairborn, OH |
| Feb 27, 1981 | | Kentucky Wesleyan | W 96–76 | 24–3 | WSU PE Building; Fairborn, OH |
NCAA tournament
| Mar 6, 1981 | | Northern Michigan; NCAA Division II Great Lakes Regional | L 64–73 | 24–4 | Western Hall; Macomb, Illinois |
| Mar 7, 1981 | | Indiana State–Evansville; NCAA Division II Great Lakes Regional | W 88–85 | 25–4 | Western Hall; Macomb, Illinois |
*Non-conference game. ^{#}Rankings from AP Poll. (#) Tournament seedings in parentheses. MW=Midwest.

== Awards and honors ==
| Rodney Benson | MVP |
| Rodney Benson | All-American Div-II |
| Roman Welch | All-American Div-II |
| Steve Hartings | Raider Award |

== Statistics ==
| Number | Name | Games | Average | Points | Assists | Rebounds |
|---|---|---|---|---|---|---|
| 24 | Rodney Benson | 28 | 21.9 | 612 | 55 | 229 |
| 44 | Roman Welch | 28 | 15.1 | 422 | 74 | 184 |
| 42 | Steve Hartings | 29 | 11.0 | 319 | 83 | 170 |
| 34 | Eddie Crowe | 29 | 10.9 | 315 | 116 | 72 |
| 29 | Keith Miller | 26 | 6.4 | 185 | 90 | 61 |
| 25 | Jeff Bragg | 28 | 5.8 | 163 | 57 | 42 |
| 35 | Steve Purcell | 28 | 4.6 | 129 | 31 | 75 |
| 23 | Tom Holzapfel | 4 | 4.5 | 18 | 0 | 8 |
| 45 | Leon Manning | 26 | 3.8 | 100 | 16 | 77 |
| 32 | Mike Zimmerman | 28 | 2.7 | 75 | 49 | 47 |
| 33 | Theron Barbour | 21 | 2.6 | 54 | 13 | 47 |
| 30 | Mike Grote | 16 | 2.0 | 32 | 11 | 10 |
| _ | Phil Benninger | 5 | 1.4 | 7 | 1 | 12 |
| 22 | Barry Turner | 9 | 1.1 | 10 | 2 | 12 |
