= 1975–76 Wright State Raiders men's basketball team =

American college basketball season

1975–76 Wright State Raiders men's basketball

1976 NCAA Division II basketball tournament, 3rd Place Great Lakes Regional
- Conference: Independent
- Record: 20–8
- Head coach: Marcus Jackson (1st season)
- Assistant coaches: Jerry Holbrook; Jim Brown
- Home arena: WSU PE Building

The 1975–76 Wright State Raiders men's basketball team represented Wright State University in the 1975–76 NCAA Division II men's basketball season. This was the first season with head coach Marcus Jackson. It was the school's first 20 win season and NCAA tournament appearance.

== Background ==
Coach Marcus Jackson was recruited from Dartmouth College to replace Coach John Ross, who had accepted a promotion to assistant athletic director following the 1974–75 season. His preseason goals for the scrappy young program were 20 wins and an NCAA tournament bid, both of which were achieved.

== Roster ==
1975–76 Wright State Raiders men's basketball team
Players
Coaches

| Pos. | # | Name | Height | Weight | Year | Hometown |
|---|---|---|---|---|---|---|
| G | 30 | Bob Grote | 6 ft 4 in (1.93 m) | 205 lb (93 kg) | Sr | Cincinnati, Ohio |
| F | 40 | Lyle Falknor | 6 ft 5 in (1.96 m) | 195 lb (88 kg) | Sr | New Madison, Ohio |
| G | 20 | Rick Martin | 5 ft 9 in (1.75 m) | 150 lb (68 kg) | Sr | Middletown, Ohio |
| F | 34 | Steve Shook | 6 ft 6 in (1.98 m) | 210 lb (95 kg) | Sr | Centerville, Ohio |
| G | 32 | Neil Reif | 6 ft 4 in (1.93 m) | 200 lb (91 kg) | Sr | Cincinnati, Ohio |
| F | 43 | Curt Shellabarger | 6 ft 7 in (2.01 m) | 210 lb (95 kg) | Jr | Celina, Ohio |
| C | 42 | Ken Millisor | 6 ft 7 in (2.01 m) | 207 lb (94 kg) | So | Bremen, Ohio |
| G | 23 | Rick Zink | 6 ft 1 in (1.85 m) | 161 lb (73 kg) | So | Dayton, Ohio |
| C | 44 | Guy Conners | 6 ft 7 in (2.01 m) | 200 lb (91 kg) | Fr | Amelia, Ohio |
| G | 22 | Bob Cook | 6 ft 3 in (1.91 m) | 175 lb (79 kg) | Fr | Miamisburg, Ohio |
| F | 33 | Dan Huguely | 6 ft 6 in (1.98 m) | 185 lb (84 kg) | Fr | Dayton, Ohio |
| F | 25 | Edgar Johnson | 6 ft 5 in (1.96 m) | 204 lb (93 kg) | Fr | Warren, Ohio |
| G | 23 | Alan McGee | 6 ft 1 in (1.85 m) | 160 lb (73 kg) | Fr | Fort Wayne, Indiana |
| G | 24 | Don Person | 6 ft 2 in (1.88 m) | 180 lb (82 kg) | Fr | Dayton, Ohio |

Head coach

- Marcus Jackson

Assistant coach(es)

Jerry Holbrook, Jim Brown

Legend

- (C) Team captain
- (S) Suspended
- (I) Ineligible
- (W) Walk-on
- Injured
- Current redshirt

== Schedule and results ==
| Date time, TV | Rank^{#} | Opponent^{#} | Result | Record | Site city, state |
Regular season
| Nov 29, 1975 | | Oakland | W 103-79 | 1–0 | WSU PE Building; Fairborn, OH |
| Dec 3, 1975 | | at Cincinnati | L 70-118 | 1–1 | Cincinnati, Ohio |
| Dec 6, 1975 | | Marian | W 107-83 | 2–1 | WSU PE Building; Fairborn, OH |
| Dec 13, 1975 | | Otterbein | W 86-84 | 3–1 | WSU PE Building; Fairborn, OH |
| Dec 16, 1975 | | Cumberland | W 87-75 | 4–1 | WSU PE Building; Fairborn, OH |
| Dec 20, 1975 | | Indianapolis | W 91-82 | 5–1 | WSU PE Building; Fairborn, OH |
| Dec 29, 1975 | | vs. Ohio Northern | W 83-80 | 6–1 | Gambier, OH |
| Dec 30, 1975 | | vs. Kenyon | L 68-73 | 6–2 | Gambier, OH |
| Jan 3, 1976 | | at Armstrong State | W 89-85 ^{OT} | 7-2 | Savannah, Georgia |
| Jan 7, 1976 | | Cleveland State | W 89-85 | 8–2 | WSU PE Building; Fairborn, OH |
| Jan 10, 1976 | | Central State | W 84-80 | 9–2 | WSU PE Building; Fairborn, OH |
| Jan 12, 1976 | | at Morehead State | L 74-94 | 9–3 | Morehead, Kentucky |
| Jan 14, 1976 | | Akron | W 78-65 | 10–3 | WSU PE Building; Fairborn, OH |
| Jan 17, 1976 | | at Stetson | L 66-70 | 10–4 | DeLand, Florida |
| Jan 21, 1976 | | Roosevelt | W 118-59 | 11–4 | WSU PE Building; Fairborn, OH |
| Jan 24, 1976 | | Indiana-Southeast | W 94-52 | 12–4 | WSU PE Building; Fairborn, OH |
| Jan 28, 1976 | | at Akron | W 84-81 ^{2OT} | 13–4 | Akron, OH |
| Jan 31, 1976 | | at Slippery Rock | L 72-75 | 13–5 | Slippery Rock, Pennsylvania |
| Feb 4, 1976 | | Northern Kentucky | W 91-87 | 14–5 | WSU PE Building; Fairborn, OH |
| Feb 7, 1976 | | at Cleveland State | W 76-62 | 15–5 | Cleveland, OH |
| Feb 11, 1976 | | at Franklin | W 58-57 | 16–5 | |
| Feb 14, 1976 | | Bellarmine | W 71-64 | 17–5 | WSU PE Building; Fairborn, OH |
| Feb 18, 1976 | | at Northern Kentucky | L 73-85 | 17–6 | Highland Heights, Kentucky |
| Feb 21, 1976 | | at Central State | L 51-59 | 17–7 | Wilberforce, Ohio |
| Feb 24, 1976 | | Thomas More | W 86-84 | 18–7 | WSU PE Building; Fairborn, OH |
| Feb 28, 1976 | | Wilmington | W 109-53 | 19–7 | WSU PE Building; Fairborn, OH |
NCAA tournament
| Mar 10, 1976 | | at Evansville | L 75-85 | 19–8 | Roberts Municipal Stadium; Evansville, Indiana |
| Mar 10, 1976 | | vs. St. Joseph’s (IN) | W 72-68 | 20–8 | Roberts Municipal Stadium; Evansville, Indiana |
*Non-conference game. ^{#}Rankings from AP Poll. (#) Tournament seedings in parentheses. MW=Midwest.

== Awards and honors ==
Bob Grote honorable mention all-America selection by Associated Press

Bob Grote MVP

Rick Martin MVP

Lyle Falknor Raider Award

== Statistics ==
| Number | Name | Games | Average | Points | Rebounds | Assists |
|---|---|---|---|---|---|---|
| 30-15 | Bob Grote | 28 | 17.1 | 479 | 189 | 66 |
| 40-20 | Lyle Falknor | 28 | 14.2 | 398 | 113 | 39 |
| 35-31 | Bob Schaefer | 28 | 12.1 | 338 | 210 | 29 |
| 20-10 | Rick Martin | 27 | 11.8 | 320 | 62 | 98 |
| 34-32 | Steve Shook | 28 | 9.5 | 266 | 166 | 21 |
| 43-30 | Curt Shellabarger | 18 | 6.9 | 124 | 95 | 18 |
| 23-11 | Alan McGee | 28 | 4.4 | 123 | 53 | 36 |
| 33-22 | Dan Huguely | 22 | 3.5 | 77 | 56 | 3 |
| 32-21 | Neil Reif | 25 | 2.8 | 69 | 45 | 13 |
| 25-24 | Edgar Johnson | 9 | 4.1 | 37 | 12 | 0 |
| 24-12 | Don Person | 6 | 3.8 | 23 | 13 | 2 |
| 42-23 | Ken Millisor | 10 | 2.2 | 22 | 19 | 2 |
| 44-25 | Guy Conners | 7 | 1.3 | 8 | 3 | 0 |
| 22-14 | Bob Cook | 8 | 0.9 | 7 | 4 | 2 |
| _ | Rick Zink | 1 | 0.0 | 0 | 1 | 1 |
