= 1977–78 Wright State Raiders men's basketball team =

American college basketball season

1977–78 Wright State Raiders men's basketball
- Conference: Independent
- Record: 14–13
- Head coach: Marcus Jackson (3rd season)
- Assistant coaches: Jerry Holbrook; Jim Brown
- Home arena: WSU PE Building

The 1977–78 Wright State Raiders men's basketball team represented Wright State University in the 1977–78 NCAA NCAA Division II men's basketball season led by head coach Marcus Jackson.

== Season summary ==
Coach Marcus Jackson's final season at Wright State was filled with as much promise as disappointment. There were extended winning streaks and maddening losing spells. The hot young coach seemed to be building a program to last, but internal disagreements came to light following on-court high jinks by Northern Kentucky, leading eventually to Jackson's dismissal at the end of the season.

== Roster ==
1977–78 Wright State Raiders men's basketball team
Players
Coaches

Pos.	#	Name	Height	Weight	Year	Previous school	Hometown
G	22	Bob Cook	6 ft 4 in (1.93 m)	175 lb (79 kg)	Jr	Miamisburg	Miamisburg, Ohio
F	33	Dan Huguely	6 ft 8 in (2.03 m)	190 lb (86 kg)	Jr	Rossevelt	Dayton, Ohio
G	23	Alan McGee	6 ft 1 in (1.85 m)	173 lb (78 kg)	Jr	North Side	Fort Wayne, Indiana
F/C	35	Bob Shaefer	6 ft 7 in (2.01 m)	208 lb (94 kg)	Jr	Alter	Kettering, Ohio
G		Jimmy Carter	6 ft 4 in (1.93 m)	—	Jr	Grand View	Jackson, Mississippi
F	40	Bob Fitzpatrick	6 ft 6 in (1.98 m)	198 lb (90 kg)	So	Mt. Healthy	Cincinnati, Ohio
F	30	Bill Wilson	6 ft 2 in (1.88 m)	160 lb (73 kg)	So	Eastmoor	Columbus, Ohio
G/F		Dave Bockhorn	6 ft 2 in (1.88 m)	—	Fr	Alter	Kettering, Ohio
F		Jeff Bragg	6 ft 5 in (1.96 m)	—	Fr	Marion	Marion, Indiana
G		Alan Crowe	6 ft 1 in (1.85 m)	—	Fr	Carlisle	Carlisle, Ohio
C		Steve Hartings	6 ft 8 in (2.03 m)	—	Fr	Marion Local
G		Mike Zimmerman	6 ft 1 in (1.85 m)	—	Fr	Alter	Kettering, Ohio

Head coach

- Marcus Jackson

Assistant coach(es)

Jerry Holbrook, Jim Brown

Legend

- (C) Team captain
- (S) Suspended
- (I) Ineligible
- (W) Walk-on
- Injured
- Current redshirt

== Schedule and results ==
Date time, TV	Rank^{#}	Opponent^{#}	Result	Record	Site city, state
Regular season
Nov 25, 1977		West Virginia Wesleyan; Wright State Invitational	W 78-76	1–0	WSU PE Building; Fairborn, OH
Nov 26, 1977		Wittenberg; Wright State Invitational	L 80-85 ^{OT}	1–1	WSU PE Building; Fairborn, OH
Nov 29, 1977		Campbellsville	W 81-69	2–1	WSU PE Building; Fairborn, OH
Dec 3, 1977		at Northern Kentucky	L 52-76	2-2	Regents Hall; Highland Heights, Kentucky
Dec 10, 1977		Morehead State	L 79–87	2–3	WSU PE Building; Fairborn, OH
Dec 13, 1977		at Miami Ohio	L 69-73	2–4	Millett Assembly Hall; Oxford, Ohio
Dec 16, 1977		Thomas Moore	W 67-57	3–4	WSU PE Building; Fairborn, OH
Dec 19, 1977		at IUPUI	W 82-79	4–4	Indianapolis
Dec 30, 1977		Wisconsin-Oshkosh	W 84-71	5–4	WSU PE Building; Fairborn, OH
Jan 5, 1978		Eastern Illinois	W 74-71	6–4	WSU PE Building; Fairborn, OH
Jan 7, 1978		at Central State	L 57-65	6-5	Wilberforce, Ohio
Jan 10, 1978		Roanoke	W 80-60	7-5	WSU PE Building; Fairborn, OH
Jan 10, 1978		at Clearwater	W 119-65	8-5	Clearwater, FL
Jan 16, 1978		at Armstrong State	W 85-74	9-5	Savannah Civic Center; Savannah, Georgia
Jan 21, 1978		Akron	W 69-61	10–5	WSU PE Building; Fairborn, OH
Jan 26, 1978		at Robert Morris	W 90-81	11-5	Moon Township, Pennsylvania
Jan 28, 1978		at Youngstown State	W 60-59	12-5	WSU PE Building; Fairborn, OH
Feb 1, 1978		Indianapolis	W 78-75	13–5	Indianapolis
Feb 4, 1978		VCU (Virginia Commonwealth)	L 59-63	13-6	WSU PE Building; Fairborn, OH
Feb 8, 1978		at Eastern Illinois	L 60-64	13-7	Lantz Fieldhouse; Charleston, Illinois
Feb 11, 1978		Bellarmine	L 63-65	13-8	WSU PE Building; Fairborn, OH
Feb 13, 1978		Milwaukee	W 71-69	14-8	WSU PE Building; Fairborn, OH
Feb 15, 1978		at Cleveland State	L 62-77	14-9	Public Hall; Cleveland, OH
Feb 18, 1978		Kentucky State	L 75-92	14-10	WSU PE Building; Fairborn, OH
Feb 20, 1978		Northern Kentucky	L 73-77 ^{OT}	14-11	WSU PE Building; Fairborn, OH
Feb 23, 1978		at Akron	L 85-88	14-12	Memorial Hall; Akron, OH
Feb 25, 1978		Point Park	L 85-95	14-13	WSU PE Building; Fairborn, OH
*Non-conference game. ^{#}Rankings from AP Poll. (#) Tournament seedings in parentheses. MW=Midwest.

== Awards and honors ==
Bob Schaefer	MVP
Joe Fitzpatrick	Raider Award

== Statistics ==
Number	Name	Games	Average	Points	Rebounds	Assists
35	Bob Schaefer	27	17.5	473	190	49
30	Bill Wilson	27	11.0	297	59	68
_	Jimmy Carter	26	8.6	224	141	23
_	Alan Crowe	27	8.3	225	57	120
40	Joe Fitzpatrick	27	6.6	179	163	11
_	Steve Hartings	24	6.5	157	128	24
33	Dan Huguely	26	5.0	131	79	9
22	Bob Cook	22	4.5	99	46	24
23	Alan McGee	24	4.3	102	22	35
_	Mike Zimmerman	23	3.0	70	24	49
_	Dave Bockhorn	12	1.8	22	9	12
_	Jeff Bragg	23	1.7	39	22	9
