= 1989–90 Wright State Raiders men's basketball team =

American college basketball season

1989–90 Wright State Raiders men's basketball
- Conference: Independent
- Record: 21-7
- Head coach: Ralph Underhill (12th season)
- Assistant coaches: Jim Brown; Jeff Dillon; Tom Rhoades; Jim Ehler
- Home arena: WSU PE Building

1989–90 NCAA Division I men's basketball independents standings
	Conf.				Overall
Team	W		L	PCT	W		L	PCT
Wright State		–		–	21	–	7	.750
Northern Illinois		–		–	17	–	11	.607
Akron		–		–	16	–	12	.571
DePaul		–		–	20	–	15	.571
Notre Dame		–		–	16	–	13	.552
Miami (FL)		–		–	13	–	15	.464
UMKC		–		–	13	–	15	.464
Southern Utah		–		–	13	–	15	.464
UMBC		–		–	12	–	16	.429
U.S. International		–		–	12	–	16	.429
Liberty		–		–	11	–	17	.393
Youngstown State		–		–	8	–	20	.286
Brooklyn		–		–	7	–	21	.250
Central Florida		–		–	7	–	21	.250
Florida International		–		–	7	–	21	.250
Central Connecticut State		–		–	6	–	22	.214
Chicago State		–		–	6	–	22	.214
Nicholls State		–		–	4	–	23	.148
Davidson		–		–	4	–	24	.143
Rankings from AP Poll

The 1989–90 Wright State Raiders men's basketball team represented Wright State University in the 1989–90 NCAA NCAA Division I men's basketball season led by head coach Ralph Underhill.

== Season summary ==
1989-90 was a key transition year for the program. Bill Edwards and Mike Nahar joined the team. It was the final season playing basketball in the Physical Education Building where the Raiders had been so dominant. And importantly, Wright State had its first 20 win season in Division I play.

== Roster ==
1989–90 Wright State Raiders men's basketball team
Players
Coaches

Pos.	#	Name	Height	Weight	Year	Previous school	Hometown
F	23	Rob Geistwhite	6 ft 6 in (1.98 m)	195 lb (88 kg)	Sr	Woodlan	Grabill, IN
G	34	Chris Wampler	6 ft 3 in (1.91 m)	170 lb (77 kg)	Sr	Tippecanoe	Tipp City, OH
F/C	44	Scott Benton	6 ft 9 in (2.06 m)	220 lb (100 kg)	RS Jr	Walton-Verona	Union, KY
PG	25	Tyrell Cromwell	5 ft 11 in (1.8 m)	170 lb (77 kg)	Jr	Allan Hancock College	Philadelphia, PA
F	32	Dave Dinn	6 ft 6 in (1.98 m)	215 lb (98 kg)	RS Jr	Boone County	Florence, KY
G/F	43	Rob Haucke	6 ft 5 in (1.96 m)	195 lb (88 kg)	So	Oak Hills	Cincinnati, OH
G	20	Marc Mumphrey	6 ft 1 in (1.85 m)	185 lb (84 kg)	So	Carroll County	Carrollton, KY
F	35	Ron Pierce	6 ft 7 in (2.01 m)	205 lb (93 kg)	So	Franklin	Franklin, OH
PG	22	Mark Woods	6 ft 1 in (1.85 m)	145 lb (66 kg)	So	Pleasure Ridge	Louisville, KY
F	42	Bill Edwards	6 ft 8 in (2.03 m)	215 lb (98 kg)	Fr	Carlisle	Middletown, OH
F	33	Sean Hammonds	6 ft 5 in (1.96 m)	—	Fr	Pleasure Ridge Park	Louisville, KY
C	52	Mike Nahar	7 ft 0 in (2.13 m)	208 lb (94 kg)	Fr	Dutch National Jr. Team	Alkmaar
F	43	Dan Skeoch	6 ft 7 in (2.01 m)	—	Fr	Anderson	Anderson, IN
F	4	Jeff Unverferth	6 ft 7 in (2.01 m)	—	RS Fr	Worthington	Worthington, OH

Head coach

- Ralph Underhill

Assistant coach(es)

Jim Brown, Jeff Dillon, Tom Rhoades, Jim Ehler

Legend

- (C) Team captain
- (S) Suspended
- (I) Ineligible
- (W) Walk-on
- Injured
- Current redshirt

== Schedule and results ==
Date time, TV	Rank^{#}	Opponent^{#}	Result	Record	Site city, state
Regular season
Nov 25, 1989		Wilmington	W 113-79	1–0	WSU PE Building; Fairborn, OH
Dec 2, 1989		vs. South Alabama; Joe Lapchick Memorial Tournament	W 96-82	2–0	Alumni Hall; Jamaica, NY
Dec 3, 1989		at No. 20 St. Johns; Joe Lapchick Memorial Tournament	L 56-76	2–1	Alumni Hall; Jamaica, NY
Dec 6, 1989		Bowling Green	L 85-92	2–2	WSU PE Building; Fairborn, OH
Dec 9, 1989		Central Michigan	W 74-73	3–2	WSU PE Building; Fairborn, OH
Dec 13, 1989		at St. Francis (NY)	W 94-80	4–2	Physical Education Center (2,450); Brooklyn Heights, NY
Dec 16, 1989		at U.S. International	W 113-105	5-2	Golden Hall; San Diego, CA
Dec 19, 1989		Southern Utah	L 81-99	5–3	Centrum Arena; Cedar City, Utah
Dec 29, 1989		Vermont; USAir Classic	W 91-82	6–3	WSU PE Building; Fairborn, OH
Dec 30, 1989		Georgia Southern; USAir Classic	W 94-91	7–3	WSU PE Building; Fairborn, OH
Jan 4, 1990		St. Francis (NY)	W 101-82	8–3	WSU PE Building (2,756); Fairborn, OH
Jan 6, 1989		at Dayton; Gem City Jam	W 101-99	9-3	UD Arena (13,511); Dayton, Ohio
Jan 10, 1990		Chicago State	W 95-72	10-3	WSU PE Building; Fairborn, OH
Jan 13, 1990		at Youngstown State	W 90-80	11-3	Beeghly Center; Youngstown, OH
Jan 15, 1990		at Akron	L 66-80	11-4	JAR Arena; Akron, OH
Jan 20, 1990		U.S. International	W 116-113	12-4	WSU PE Building; Fairborn, OH
Jan 24, 1990		Eastern Kentucky	W 79-66	13–4	WSU PE Building; Fairborn, OH
Jan 27, 1990		at Liberty	W 96-84	14–4	Liberty Gym; Lynchburg, VA
Jan 31, 1990		Central State	W 99-82	15-4	WSU PE Building; Fairborn, OH
Feb 3, 1990		Northern Illinois	W 66-47	16-4	WSU PE Building; Fairborn, OH
Feb 7, 1990		at Kent State	L 95-108	16–5	Memorial Gymnasium; Kent, Ohio
Feb 10, 1990		Youngstown State	W 94-74	17-5	WSU PE Building; Fairborn, OH
Feb 15, 1990		Southern Utah	W 108-93	18–5	WSU PE Building; Fairborn, OH
Feb 20, 1990		at St. Bonaventure	L 82-84	18–6	Reilly Center; Allegany, NY
Feb 24, 1990		Akron	W 96-77	19–6	WSU PE Building; Fairborn, OH
Jan 28, 1990		Ashland	W 81-77	20-6	WSU PE Building; Fairborn, OH
Mar 3, 1990		Chicago State	W 112-94	21-6	Physical Education and Athletics Building; Chicago, IL
Mar 5, 1990		at Northern Illinois	L 77-84	21-7	Chick Evans Field House; DeKalb, IL
*Non-conference game. ^{#}Rankings from AP Poll. (#) Tournament seedings in parentheses. MW=Midwest.

== Awards and honors ==
Bill Edwards	MVP
Chris Wampler	Raider Award

== Statistics ==
Number	Name	Games	Average	Points	Assists	Rebounds
42	Bill Edwards	28	15.4	432	31	192
20	Marcus Mumphrey	28	15.3	427	50	45
33	Sean Hammonds	28	14.2	397	44	199
32	Dave Dinn	27	10.0	270	38	117
44	Scott Benton	28	9.9	278	31	128
25	Tyrell Cromwell	28	8.0	225	147	85
22	Mark Woods	28	7.0	197	129	52
34	Chris Wampler	28	4.6	129	45	37
40	Jeff Unverferth	28	3.9	110	11	64
23	Rob Geistwhite	10	2.7	27	1	10
35	Ron Pierce	9	1.4	14	1	7
35	Dan Skeoch	14	1.4	20	0	6
43	Bob Haucke	16	1.1	17	2	8
52	Mike Nahar	17	0.5	8	2	18
