= 1971–72 Wright State Raiders men's basketball team =

American college basketball season

1971–72 Wright State Raiders men's basketball
- Conference: Independent
- Record: 9–14
- Head coach: John Ross (2nd season)
- Assistant coach: Jim Brown
- Home arena: Stebbins High School

The 1971–72 Wright State Raiders men's basketball team, led by head coach John Ross, represented Wright State University in the 1971-72 NCAA College Division men's basketball season. They played their home games at Stebbins High School in Riverside, Ohio.

== Previous season ==
The 1970-71 team went 7–17 in Wright State's first varsity season.

== Season summary ==
The Raiders finished 9–14 in their second varsity season in which the young team had become more competitive and showed hints of the success to come.

== Roster ==
1971–72 Wright State Raiders men's basketball team
Players
Coaches

Pos.	#	Name	Height	Weight	Year	Previous school	Hometown
G	11	Phil McKee	6 ft 0 in (1.83 m)	175 lb (79 kg)	Fr	Shawnee	Lima, Ohio
G	12	Fred Clark	6 ft 2 in (1.88 m)	178 lb (81 kg)	So	Roosevelt	Dayton, Ohio
F	14	Bill Marras	6 ft 4 in (1.93 m)	190 lb (86 kg)	Fr	Fairmont West	Kettering, Ohio
F	21	Bill Fogt	6 ft 3 in (1.91 m)	185 lb (84 kg)	So	Piqua	Piqua, Ohio
C	22	Greg McCurdy	6 ft 7 in (2.01 m)	200 lb (91 kg)	So	Centerville	Centerville, Ohio
G	23	Tim Walker	6 ft 2 in (1.88 m)	180 lb (82 kg)	So	Centerville	Centerville, Ohio
F	25	Jim Minch	6 ft 6 in (1.98 m)	190 lb (86 kg)	So	Carroll	Dayton, Ohio
C	31	Dan Swain	6 ft 8 in (2.03 m)	205 lb (93 kg)	Fr	Beavercreek	Beavercreek, Ohio
F	32	John Lucas	6 ft 6 in (1.98 m)	208 lb (94 kg)	Fr	Fairmont East	Kettering, Ohio
G		Don Vorhees	6 ft 0 in (1.83 m)	—	So	Beavercreek
G		Mike Tollinger	6 ft 1 in (1.85 m)	—	Jr	Stebbins	Riverside, Ohio
G		Ben Phifer	5 ft 11 in (1.8 m)	—		Troy

Head coach

- John Ross (Wilmington)

Assistant coach(es)

Jim Brown (Dayton)

Legend

- (C) Team captain
- (S) Suspended
- (I) Ineligible
- (W) Walk-on
- Injured
- Current redshirt

== Schedule and results ==
Date time, TV	Rank^{#}	Opponent^{#}	Result	Record	Site city, state
Regular season
Nov 30, 1971		Berea	W 88-87	1–0	Stebbins High School; Riverside, OH
Dec 3, 1971		vs. Spring Arbor; Taylor Invitational	W 75-71	2–0	Upland, Indiana
Dec 4, 1971		at Taylor; Taylor Invitational	L 88-104	2–1	Upland, Indiana
Dec 11, 1971		at Bellarmine	W 52-47	2–2	
Dec 13, 1971		at Rose-Hulman	L 70-89	2–3	Terre Haute, Indiana
Dec 21, 1971		Kenyon	L 52-71	2–4	Stebbins High School; Riverside, OH
Dec 28, 1971		vs. Aquinas	L 63-80	2–5	Allendale, Michigan
Dec 29, 1971		at Grand Valley State	L 86-111	2–6	Allendale, Michigan
Jan 3, 1972		Thomas Moore	L 61-76	2–7	Stebbins High School; Riverside, OH
Jan 8, 1972		at Marian (IN)	W 109-107 ^{2OT}	3–7	Indianapolis
Jan 12, 1972		at Wilmington	L 59-73	3–8	Wilmington, Ohio
Jan 15, 1972		Wilberforce	L 77-78	3–9	Stebbins High School; Riverside, OH
Jan 18, 1972		Cedarville	W 85-77	4–9	Stebbins High School; Riverside, OH
Jan 22, 1972		Rio Grande	L 69-71	5–9	Stebbins High School; Riverside, OH
Jan 25, 1972		Cumberland	W 93-81	6–9	Stebbins High School; Riverside, OH
Jan 28, 1972		Northwood	L 63-89	6-10	Stebbins High School; Riverside, OH
Feb 2, 1972		at Wilberforce	W 95-81	7–10	Wilberforce, Ohio
Feb 5, 1972		at Ohio Northern	L 85-94	7–11	Ada, OH
Feb 8, 1972		at Cumberland	L 83-91	7–12	Williamsburg, KY
Feb 12, 1972		at Cleveland State	L 65-75	7–13	Cleveland, OH
Feb 18, 1972		Walsh	W 86-82	8–13	Stebbins High School; Riverside, OH
Feb 24, 1972		Earlham	W 81-74	9-13	Stebbins High School; Riverside, OH
Feb 27, 1972		at Thomas Moore	L 70-81	9–14	Crestview Hills, Kentucky
*Non-conference game. ^{#}Rankings from AP Poll. (#) Tournament seedings in parentheses. MW=Midwest.

== Statistics ==
Number	Name	Games	Average	Points	Rebounds
23	Tim Walker	23	17.1	394	98
21	Bill Fogt	20	13.8	277	218
32	John Lucas	23	10.0	230	108
22	Greg McCurdy	23	8.3	193	165
25	Jim Minch	20	9.0	180	154
12	Fred Clark	21	6.5	138	71
11	Phil McKee	20	5.4	108	27
14	Bill Marras	19	5.3	101	70
23	Don Vorhees	19	3.4	66	25
20	Dan Swain	20	3.0	60	67
	Mike Tollinger	6	2.0	12	17
	Ben Phifer	10	1.0	10	2

== Awards ==
Bill Fogt	MVP
Bill Fogt	Raider Award
Tim Walker	Guardian Award
