= 1986–87 Wright State Raiders men's basketball team =

American college basketball season

1986–87 Wright State Raiders men's basketball
- Conference: Independent
- Record: 20-8
- Head coach: Ralph Underhill (9th season)
- Assistant coaches: Jim Brown; Bob Grote; John Ross
- Home arena: WSU PE Building

The 1986–87 Wright State Raiders men's basketball team represented Wright State University in the 1986–87 NCAA NCAA Division II men's basketball season led by head coach Ralph Underhill.

== Season summary ==
The Wright State Raiders concluded their tenure competing at the NCAA Division II level in typical dominant fashion with another 20 win season.

== Roster ==
1986–87 Wright State Raiders men's basketball team
Players
Coaches

Pos.	#	Name	Height	Weight	Year	Previous school	Hometown
F	42	Henry Grace	6 ft 7 in (2.01 m)	185 lb (84 kg)	Sr	Groveport-Madison	Beavercreek, OH
G	25	Lenny Lyons	6 ft 1 in (1.85 m)	165 lb (75 kg)	Sr	Elder	Cincinnati, OH
F	24	Rodney Webb	6 ft 9 in (2.06 m)	195 lb (88 kg)	Sr	Morrow	Morrow, GA
G	22	Joe Jackson	6 ft 3 in (1.91 m)	170 lb (77 kg)	Jr	George Westinghouse	Brooklyn, NY
F	40	James Jones	6 ft 4 in (1.93 m)	185 lb (84 kg)	Jr	East Kemper	Lauderdale, MS
G	35	Bert Seard	6 ft 4 in (1.93 m)	195 lb (88 kg)	Jr	Patterson-Cooperative	Dayton, OH
F/C	44	Scott Benton	6 ft 8 in (2.03 m)	210 lb (95 kg)	Fr	Walton-Verona	Union, KY
G	20	Corey Brown	5 ft 11 in (1.8 m)	180 lb (82 kg)	Fr	Murray-Bergtraum	Bronx, NY
F	32	Dave Dinn	6 ft 6 in (1.98 m)	195 lb (88 kg)	Fr	Boone County	Florence, KY
G	23	Rob Geistwhite	6 ft 6 in (1.98 m)	190 lb (86 kg)	Fr	Woodlan	Grabill, IN
G	33	Matt Horstman	6 ft 5 in (1.96 m)	180 lb (82 kg)	Fr	Alter	Dayton, OH
F	43	Craig Swanger	6 ft 7 in (2.01 m)	185 lb (84 kg)	Fr	Madison	Middletown, OH
F	45	Tony Trosper	6 ft 6 in (1.98 m)	210 lb (95 kg)	Fr	Daleville	Daleville, IN
G	34	Chris Wampler	6 ft 3 in (1.91 m)	170 lb (77 kg)	Fr	Tippecanoe	Tipp City, OH

Head coach

- Ralph Underhill

Assistant coach(es)

Jim Brown, Bob Grote, John Ross

Legend

- (C) Team captain
- (S) Suspended
- (I) Ineligible
- (W) Walk-on
- Injured
- Current redshirt

== Schedule and results ==
Date time, TV	Rank^{#}	Opponent^{#}	Result	Record	Site city, state
Regular season
Nov 25, 1986		Ohio Dominican	W 106-60	1-0	WSU PE Building; Fairborn, OH
Nov 29, 1986		Indiana-Purdue-Ft. Wayne	W 79-78	2-0	WSU PE Building; Fairborn, OH
Dec 4, 1986		Northern Kentucky	W 63-60	3-0	WSU PE Building; Fairborn, OH
Dec 6, 1986		at Toledo	L 73-75	3–1	Centennial Hall; Toledo, OH
Dec 10, 1986		Michigan-Dearborn	W 116-77	4-1	WSU PE Building; Fairborn, OH
Dec 13, 1986		at Kentucky Wesleyan	L 75-114	4-2	Owensboro Sportscenter; Owensboro, Kentucky
Dec 16, 1986		Northeastern Illinois	W 122-85	5–2	WSU PE Building; Fairborn, OH
Dec 20, 1986		at Queens	W 77-67	6–2	Fitzgerald Gym; Flushing, NY
Dec 22, 1986		at Pace	L 68-71	6–3	Civic Center Gym; New York, NY
Jan 3, 1987		Wooster	W 100-75	7–3	WSU PE Building; Fairborn, OH
Jan 6, 1987		Kentucky Wesleyan	W 70-64	8-3	WSU PE Building; Fairborn, OH
Jan 9, 1987		Queens; Wright State Invitational	W 75-61	9–3	WSU PE Building; Fairborn, OH
Jan 10, 1987		Eastern Montana; Wright State Invitational	W 76-73	10–3	WSU PE Building; Fairborn, OH
Jan 17, 1987		Manchester	W 93-53	11–3	WSU PE Building; Fairborn, OH
Jan 19, 1987		Edinboro	L 77-79	11-4	McComb Fieldhouse; Edinboro, PA
Jan 21, 1987		Indiana Central	W 52-47	12-4	WSU PE Building; Fairborn, OH
Jan 24, 1987		Findlay	L 69-72	12-5	WSU PE Building; Fairborn, OH
Jan 28, 1987		at Youngstown State	L 90-99	12-6	Beeghly Center; Youngstown, OH
Jan 31, 1987		at Kentucky State	W 92-80	13-6	Capital Sports Center; Frankfort, Kentucky
Feb 2, 1987		IUPUI	W 92-82	14-6	WSU PE Building; Fairborn, OH
Feb 4, 1987		vs. Central State	L 77-81	14-7	UD Arena; Dayton, Ohio
Feb 7, 1987		at Northern Kentucky	L 52-64	14-8	Regents Hall; Highland Heights, Kentucky
Feb 11, 1987		Kentucky State	W 82-74	15-8	WSU PE Building; Fairborn, OH
Dec 14, 1987		Ashland	W 69-67	16-8	WSU PE Building; Fairborn, OH
Feb 18, 1987		Wilmington	W 94-74	17–8	WSU PE Building; Fairborn, OH
Feb 21, 1987		Spring Arbor	W 112-70	18-8	WSU PE Building; Fairborn, OH
Feb 25, 1987		at Indiana-Purdue-Ft. Wayne	W 70-68	19-8	IPFW Gymnasium; Fort Wayne, Indiana
Feb 28, 1987		Quincy	W 93-71	20-8	WSU PE Building; Fairborn, OH
*Non-conference game. ^{#}Rankings from AP Poll. (#) Tournament seedings in parentheses. MW=Midwest.

== Awards and honors ==
Lenny Lyons	MVP
Joe Jackson	MVP
Dave Dinn	Raider Award

== Statistics ==
Number	Name	Games	Average	Points	Assists	Rebounds
22	Joe Jackson	28	16.5	462	76	174
28	Lenny Lyons	31	13.3	373	199	74
24	Rodney Webb	28	11.4	319	23	172
33	Matt Horstman	20	8.8	175	16	36
40	James Jones	20	8.2	230	22	181
32	Dave Dinn	28	7.0	196	36	124
23	Rob Geistwhite	23	6.1	141	18	39
20	Corey Brown	26	5.8	150	61	44
34	Chris Wampler	28	5.7	159	40	51
35	Bill Seard	2	4.5	9	2	2
42	Henry Grace	18	3.2	79	11	61
44	Scott Benton	4	2.5	10	1	12
43	Kraig Swanger	8	1.4	11	1	9
