= 1984–85 Wright State Raiders men's basketball team =

American college basketball season

1984–85 Wright State Raiders men's basketball

NCAA tournament, Runner-Up Great Lakes Regional
- Conference: Independent
- Record: 22-7
- Head coach: Ralph Underhill (7th season)
- Assistant coaches: Jim Brown; Bob Grote; John Ross
- Home arena: WSU PE Building

The 1984–85 Wright State Raiders men's basketball team represented Wright State University in the 1984–85 NCAA NCAA Division II men's basketball season led by head coach Ralph Underhill.

== Season summary ==
A dominant Division-II program once again hits the 20 win mark and earns a trip to the NCAA tournament. The young Raiders struggled on the road (1-7), but dominated all comers in the PE Building.

== Roster ==
1984–85 Wright State Raiders men's basketball team
Players
Coaches

Pos.	#	Name	Height	Weight	Year	Previous school	Hometown
C	33	Theron Barbour	6 ft 9 in (2.06 m)	220 lb (100 kg)	Sr	Atherton	Louisville, Kentucky
G	43	Eric Ernst	6 ft 5 in (1.96 m)	200 lb (91 kg)	Sr	Middletown	Middletown, Ohio
F/C	42	Jerome Black	6 ft 7 in (2.01 m)	200 lb (91 kg)	Jr	Nova	Fort Lauderdale, Florida
F	35	Grant Marion	6 ft 7 in (2.01 m)	210 lb (95 kg)	Jr	John Hay	Cleveland, Ohio
G	34	Mark McCormick	6 ft 3 in (1.91 m)	165 lb (75 kg)	Jr	Fairmont East	Kettering, Ohio
G/F	23	Mark Vest	6 ft 6 in (1.98 m)	200 lb (91 kg)	Jr	Carroll	Beavercreek, Ohio
F	32	Robbie Sanders	6 ft 6 in (1.98 m)	200 lb (91 kg)	Jr	Olentangy	Columbus, Ohio
G/F	45	Al Taylor	6 ft 5 in (1.96 m)	185 lb (84 kg)	Jr	A.C. Flora	Columbia, South Carolina
F	44	Andy Warner	6 ft 5 in (1.96 m)	200 lb (91 kg)	Jr	Piqua	Piqua, Ohio
G	25	Lenny Lyons	6 ft 1 in (1.85 m)	175 lb (79 kg)	So	Elder	Cincinnati, Ohio
G	30	Bert Seard	6 ft 4 in (1.93 m)	195 lb (88 kg)	So	Patterson Cooperative	Dayton, Ohio
F	24	Rodney Webb	6 ft 9 in (2.06 m)	205 lb (93 kg)	So	Morrow	Morrow, Georgia
G	22	Joe Jackson	6 ft 3 in (1.91 m)	170 lb (77 kg)	Fr	George Westinghouse	Brooklyn, New York
F	40	James Jones	6 ft 5 in (1.96 m)	185 lb (84 kg)	Fr	East Kemper	Lauderdale, Mississippi
G	20	Tyrone Joye	5 ft 10 in (1.78 m)	170 lb (77 kg)	Fr	Harry S. Truman	New York, New York

Head coach

- Ralph Underhill

Assistant coach(es)

Jim Brown, Bob Grote, John Ross

Legend

- (C) Team captain
- (S) Suspended
- (I) Ineligible
- (W) Walk-on
- Injured
- Current redshirt

== Schedule and results ==
Date time, TV	Rank^{#}	Opponent^{#}	Result	Record	Site city, state
Regular season
Nov 21, 1984		Grace	W 102-73	1-0	WSU PE Building; Fairborn, OH
Nov 24, 1984		Northeastern Illinois	W 91-83	2–0	WSU PE Building; Fairborn, OH
Dec 4, 1984		Malone	W 67-65	3–0	WSU PE Building; Fairborn, OH
Dec 8, 1984		at Kentucky Wesleyan	L 53-76	3-1	Owensboro Sportscenter; Owensboro, Kentucky
Dec 12, 1984		Ashland	L 71-76	4-1	Kates Gym; Ashland, OH
Dec 15, 1984		at Indiana-Purdue-Ft. Wayne	W 83-72	5-1	IPFW Gymnasium; Fort Wayne, Indiana
Dec 17, 1984		Bellarmine	W 93-84	6-1	WSU PE Building; Fairborn, OH
Dec 21, 1984		vs. District of Columbia; Florida Southern Invitational	W 93-81	7-1	Lakeland, FL
Dec 22, 1984		at Florida Southern; Florida Southern Invitational	L 62-66	7-2	Lakeland, FL
Jan 2, 1985		Franklin	W 82-75	8-2	WSU PE Building; Fairborn, OH
Jan 4, 1985		Missouri–St. Louis; Wright State Invitational	W 83-78 ^{OT}	9–2	WSU PE Building; Fairborn, OH
Jan 5, 1985		Central State; Wright State Invitational	W 85-70	10-2	WSU PE Building; Fairborn, OH
Jan 9, 1985		at IUPUI	L 74-77	10-3	Harry E. Wood Continuing Education Center; Indianapolis
Jan 12, 1985		Marycrest	W 99-86	11-3	WSU PE Building; Fairborn, OH
Jan 16, 1985		Kentucky Wesleyan	W 88-82	12-3	WSU PE Building; Fairborn, OH
Jan 19, 1985		Ashland	W 79-76	13-3	WSU PE Building; Fairborn, OH
Jan 21, 1985		Indiana Central	W 79-71	14-3	WSU PE Building; Fairborn, OH
Jan 26, 1985		Northern Kentucky	W 55-53	15-3	WSU PE Building; Fairborn, OH
Jan 31, 1985		Urbana	W 113-78	16–3	WSU PE Building; Fairborn, OH
Feb 2, 1985		Michigan-Dearborn	W 115-63	17-3	WSU PE Building; Fairborn, OH
Feb 6, 1985		vs. Central State	W 71-62	18-3	WSU PE Building; Fairborn, OH
Feb 9, 1985		at SIU Edwardsville	L 58-59	18-4	Vadalabene Center; Edwardsville, Illinois
Feb 16, 1985		SIU Edwardsville	W 81-59	19-4	WSU PE Building; Fairborn, OH
Feb 18, 1985		at Charleston	L 92-149	19-5	Eddie King Gymnasium; Charleston, West Virginia
Feb 23, 1985		Spring Arbor	W 91-68	20-5	WSU PE Building; Fairborn, OH
Feb 27, 1985		Wayne State	W 97-82	21-5	WSU PE Building; Fairborn, OH
Mar 2, 1985		at Northern Kentucky	L 69-71	21-6	Regents Hall; Highland Heights, Kentucky
NCAA tournament
Mar 10, 1985		at Lewis; NCAA Division II Great Lakes Regional	W 61-53	22–6	Owensboro Sportscenter; Owensboro, Kentucky
Mar 6, 1985		at Kentucky Wesleyan; NCAA Division II Great Lakes Regional	L 71-76	22-7	Owensboro Sportscenter; Owensboro, Kentucky
*Non-conference game. ^{#}Rankings from AP Poll. (#) Tournament seedings in parentheses. MW=Midwest.

== Awards and honors ==
Mark Vest	MVP
Andy Warner	All American
Rodney Webb	Raider Award

== Statistics ==
Number	Name	Games	Average	Points	Assists	Rebounds
23	Mark Vest	29	18.4	535	48	173
44	Andy Warner	29	12.1	350	24	122
35	Grant Marion	28	8.1	226	26	151
34	Mark McCormick	29	7.9	228	97	76
20	Tyrone Joye	29	7.3	212	124	32
33	Thernon Barbour	29	6.7	194	13	118
22	Joe Jackson	28	6.5	181	25	43
25	Lenny Lyons	29	5.4	156	113	37
24	Rodney Webb	26	4.3	113	19	86
40	James Jones	13	3.5	45	2	28
43	Eric Ernst	9	3.2	29	2	11
32	Rob Sanders	16	2.8	44	9	30
45	Al Taylor	10	2.4	24	3	13
42	Jerome Black	6	1.8	11	1	16
30	Bert Seard	8	1.4	11	2	7
