= 1985–86 Wright State Raiders men's basketball team =

American college basketball season

1985–86 Wright State Raiders men's basketball

NCAA tournament, Quarterfinals
- Conference: Independent
- Record: 28-3
- Head coach: Ralph Underhill (8th season)
- Assistant coaches: Jim Brown; Bob Grote; John Ross
- Home arena: WSU PE Building

The 1985–86 Wright State Raiders men's basketball team represented Wright State University in the 1985–86 NCAA NCAA Division II men's basketball season led by head coach Ralph Underhill.

== Season summary ==
A veteran team that outclassed many opponents and beat nearly all of the rest. The season of victories didn't end until the NCAA Division II Quarterfinals.

== Roster ==
1985–86 Wright State Raiders men's basketball team
Players
Coaches

Pos.	#	Name	Height	Weight	Year	Previous school	Hometown
G/F	23	Mark Vest	6 ft 6 in (1.98 m)	195 lb (88 kg)	Sr	Carroll	Beavercreek, OH
F	32	Rob Sanders	6 ft 6 in (1.98 m)	215 lb (98 kg)	Sr	Olentangy	Columbus, OH
G	34	Mark McCormick	6 ft 4 in (1.93 m)	170 lb (77 kg)	Sr	Fairmont East	Kettering, OH
F	35	Grant Marion	6 ft 6 in (1.98 m)	215 lb (98 kg)	Sr	John Hay	Cleveland, OH
F	44	Andy Warner	6 ft 5 in (1.96 m)	220 lb (100 kg)	Sr	Piqua	Piqua, OH
G/F	45	Al Taylor	6 ft 4 in (1.93 m)	180 lb (82 kg)	Sr	A.C. Flora	Columbia, SC
F	42	Henry Grace	6 ft 7 in (2.01 m)	185 lb (84 kg)	Jr	Groveport-Madison	Beavercreek, OH
G	25	Lenny Lyons	6 ft 1 in (1.85 m)	165 lb (75 kg)	Jr	Elder	Cincinnati, Ohio
F	24	Rodney Webb	6 ft 8 in (2.03 m)	195 lb (88 kg)	Jr	Morrow	Morrow, Georgia
G	22	Joe Jackson	6 ft 3 in (1.91 m)	170 lb (77 kg)	So	George Westinghouse	Brooklyn, New York
F	40	James Jones	6 ft 4 in (1.93 m)	185 lb (84 kg)	So	East Kemper	Lauderdale, Mississippi
G	20	Tyrone Joye	5 ft 10 in (1.78 m)	175 lb (79 kg)	So	Harry S. Truman	New York, New York

Head coach

- Ralph Underhill

Assistant coach(es)

Jim Brown, Bob Grote, John Ross

Legend

- (C) Team captain
- (S) Suspended
- (I) Ineligible
- (W) Walk-on
- Injured
- Current redshirt

== Schedule and results ==
Date time, TV	Rank^{#}	Opponent^{#}	Result	Record	Site city, state
Regular season
Nov 23, 1985		at Indiana-Purdue-Ft. Wayne	W 75-66	1-0	IPFW Gymnasium; Fort Wayne, IN
Nov 25, 1985		Northern Kentucky	W 86-74	2-0	WSU PE Building; Fairborn, OH
Nov 27, 1985		Southern Indiana	W 108-102 ^{2OT}	3–0	WSU PE Building; Fairborn, OH
Nov 30, 1985		Lake Superior State	W 111-61	4–0	WSU PE Building; Fairborn, OH
Dec 7, 1985		at Toledo	W 67-66	5–0	Centennial Hall; Toledo, OH
Dec 11, 1985		Ashland	W 72-65	6-0	WSU PE Building; Fairborn, OH
Dec 14, 1985		at Kentucky Wesleyan	L 75-90	6-1	Owensboro Sportscenter; Owensboro, KY
Dec 16, 1985		at Southern Indiana	L 75-84	6–2	PAC Arena; Evansville, IN
Dec 19, 1985		Northeastern Illinois	W 107-79	7–2	WSU PE Building; Fairborn, OH
Dec 21, 1985		Otterbein	W 78-71	8-2	WSU PE Building; Fairborn, OH
Jan 3, 1986		St. Michael's; Wright State Invitational	W 98-74	9-2	WSU PE Building; Fairborn, OH
Jan 4, 1986		SIU Edwardsville; Wright State Invitational	W 86-59	10-2	WSU PE Building; Fairborn, OH
Jan 8, 1985		IUPUI	W 97-73	11-2	WSU PE Building; Fairborn, OH
Jan 11, 1986		Michigan-Dearborn	W 105-54	12-2	WSU PE Building; Fairborn, OH
Jan 13, 1986		Indiana-Purdue-Ft. Wayne	W 67-61	13-2	WSU PE Building; Fairborn, OH
Jan 15, 1986		Marion	W 117-81	14–2	WSU PE Building; Fairborn, OH
Jan 18, 1986		at Bellarmine	W 74-66	15-2	Knights Hall; Louisville, KY
Jan 20, 1986		Charleston	W 104-102 ^{2OT}	16-2	WSU PE Building; Fairborn, OH
Jan 25, 1976		Ashland	W 68-57	17-2	Kates Gym; Ashland, OH
Jan 30, 1986		vs. Central State	W 110-77	18-2	UD Arena; Dayton, Ohio
Feb 1, 1986		Oakland City	W 70-50	19–2	WSU PE Building; Fairborn, OH
Feb 8, 1986		Kentucky Wesleyan	W 87-84	20-2	WSU PE Building; Fairborn, OH
Feb 13, 1986		Malone	W 71-69	21-2	WSU PE Building; Fairborn, OH
Feb 15, 1986		Franklin	W 90-78	22-2	WSU PE Building; Fairborn, OH
Feb 18, 1986		at Northern Kentucky	W 74-67	23-2	Regents Hall; Highland Heights, KY
Feb 22, 1986		Edinboro	W 91-87	24-2	WSU PE Building; Fairborn, OH
Feb 27, 1986		Kentucky State	W 91-68	25-2	WSU PE Building; Fairborn, OH
Mar 1, 1986		at Indiana Central	W 76-67	26-2	Nickoson Hall; Indianapolis
NCAA tournament
Mar 7, 1986		Kentucky Wesleyan; NCAA Division II Great Lakes Regional	W 94-84	27-2	WSU PE Building; Fairborn, OH
Mar 8, 1986		SIU Edwardsville; NCAA Division II Great Lakes Regional	W 77-73	28–2	WSU PE Building; Fairborn, OH
Mar 15, 1986		Cheyney; NCAA Division II Quarterfinals	L 75-78	28–3	WSU PE Building; Fairborn, OH
*Non-conference game. ^{#}Rankings from AP Poll. (#) Tournament seedings in parentheses. MW=Midwest.

== Awards and honors ==
Mark Vest	MVP
Andy Warner	MVP
Mark Vest	All American
Grant Marion	All American
Joe Jackson	Raider Award

== Statistics ==
Number	Name	Games	Average	Points	Assists	Rebounds
44	Andy Warner	29	17.8	517	28	171
23	Mark Vest	31	16.6	515	54	188
35	Grant Marion	31	15.5	482	75	234
22	Joe Jackson	30	10.5	316	93	137
25	Lenny Lyons	31	9.5	296	259	56
20	Tyrone Joye	29	6.4	186	86	34
24	Rodney Webb	17	5.5	169	14	100
32	Rob Sanders	15	2.8	42	9	31
42	Henry Grace	18	2.8	50	3	24
45	Al Taylor	22	2.7	60	6	39
40	James Jones	20	1.3	25	6	39
34	Mark McCormick	15	1.2	18	20	20
