= 1978–79 Wright State Raiders men's basketball team =

American college basketball season

1978–79 Wright State Raiders men's basketball

NCAA tournament, Runner-up Great Lakes Regional
- Conference: Independent
- Record: 20-8
- Head coach: Ralph Underhill (1st season)
- Assistant coach: Jim Brown
- Home arena: WSU PE Building

The 1978–79 Wright State Raiders men's basketball team represented Wright State University in the 1978–79 NCAA NCAA Division II men's basketball season led by head coach Ralph Underhill.

== Season summary ==
Coach Ralph Underhill convinced his team for his fast paced pressing style, earning the first 20 wins of his long tenure.

== Roster ==
1978–79 Wright State Raiders men's basketball team
Players
Coaches

Pos.	#	Name	Height	Weight	Year	Previous school	Hometown
G		Jimmy Carter	6 ft 4 in (1.93 m)	—	Sr	Grand View	Jackson, Mississippi
G	22	Bob Cook	6 ft 4 in (1.93 m)	175 lb (79 kg)	Sr	Miamisburg	Miamisburg, Ohio
F	33	Dan Huguely	6 ft 8 in (2.03 m)	190 lb (86 kg)	Sr	Rossevelt	Dayton, Ohio
F/C	35	Bob Schaefer	6 ft 7 in (2.01 m)	208 lb (94 kg)	Sr	Alter	Kettering, Ohio
F	40	Joe Fitzpatrick	6 ft 6 in (1.98 m)	198 lb (90 kg)	Jr	Mt. Healthy	Cincinnati, Ohio
F		Leon Manning	6 ft 6 in (1.98 m)	—	Jr	Indianapolis
F		James Pinkney	6 ft 6 in (1.98 m)	—	Jr	Pompano Beach, Florida
F	30	Bill Wilson	6 ft 2 in (1.88 m)	160 lb (73 kg)	Jr	Eastmoor	Columbus, Ohio
F		Jeff Bragg	6 ft 5 in (1.96 m)	—	So	Marion	Marion, Indiana
G		Eddie Crowe	6 ft 1 in (1.85 m)	—	So	Carlisle	Carlisle, Ohio
G		Mike Zimmerman	6 ft 1 in (1.85 m)	—	So	Alter	Kettering, Ohio
C		Steve Hartings	6 ft 8 in (2.03 m)	—	So	Marion Local
F		Tom Holzapfel	6 ft 6 in (1.98 m)	—	Fr	Greenville	Greenville, Ohio
F		Vince Shively	6 ft 6 in (1.98 m)	—	Fr	Greenville	Greenville, Ohio
G/F		Dave Bockhorn (injured)	6 ft 2 in (1.88 m)	—	So	Alter	Kettering, Ohio

Head coach

- Ralph Underhill

Assistant coach(es)

Jim Brown

Legend

- (C) Team captain
- (S) Suspended
- (I) Ineligible
- (W) Walk-on
- Injured
- Current redshirt

== Schedule and results ==
Date time, TV	Rank^{#}	Opponent^{#}	Result	Record	Site city, state
Regular season
Nov 28, 1978		Wilberforce	W 103-73	1-0	WSU PE Building; Fairborn, OH
Dec 2, 1978		at Miami Ohio	W 64-63	2–0	Millett Assembly Hall; Oxford, Ohio
Dec 4, 1978		Northern Kentucky	W 74-69 ^{OT}	3-0	UD Arena; Dayton, OH
Dec 6, 1978		Indianapolis	W 72-70	4–0	WSU PE Building; Fairborn, OH
Dec 9, 1978		at Eastern Illinois	L 72-79	4-1	Lantz Fieldhouse; Charleston, Illinois
Dec 11, 1978		at St. Joseph’s (IN)	W 73-65	5–1	Roberts Municipal Stadium; Evansville, Indiana
Dec 16, 1978		Otterbein	W 112-94	6-1	WSU PE Building; Fairborn, OH
Dec 20, 1978		at Youngstown State	W 75-55	7-1	Beeghly Center; Youngstown, OH
Dec 22, 1978		Capital	W 85-81	8-1	WSU PE Building; Fairborn, OH
Jan 4, 1979		at Akron	L 71-76	8-2	Memorial Hall; Akron, OH
Jan 6, 1978		Northeastern Illinois	W 133-86	9–2	WSU PE Building; Fairborn, OH
Jan 8, 1979		vs. Central State	W 89-82	10-2	UD Arena; Dayton, Ohio
Jan 10, 1979		at Indianapolis	L 73-91	10-3	Indianapolis
Jan 13, 1979		Thomas Moore	L 78-82	10–4	WSU PE Building; Fairborn, OH
Jan 17, 1979		at Oakland	L 54-55 ^{OT}	10–5	Sports and Recreation Building; Rochester, Michigan
Jan 20, 1979		Elmhurst	W 96-77	11–5	WSU PE Building; Fairborn, OH
Jan 20, 1979		at Missouri–St. Louis	L 89-94	11–6	St. Louis, Missouri
Jan 27, 1979		IUPUI	W 117-64	12–6	WSU PE Building; Fairborn, OH
Jan 31, 1979		at Northern Kentucky	W 80-63	13-6	Regents Hall; Highland Heights, Kentucky
Feb 5, 1979		Eastern Illinois	W 80-63	14-6	UD Arena; Dayton, OH
Feb 10, 1979		at Bellarmine	W 89-83	15–6	Knights Hall; Louisville, Kentucky
Feb 14, 1977		Cleveland State	W 70-64	16-6	UD Arena; Dayton, OH
Feb 17, 1979		Akron	W 91-80	17–6	WSU PE Building; Fairborn, OH
Feb 21, 1979		St. Joseph’s (IN)	L 78-79 ^{OT}	17-7	WSU PE Building; Fairborn, OH
Feb 21, 1979		Missouri–St. Louis	W 94-75	18–7	WSU PE Building; Fairborn, OH
Feb 26, 1979		Spring Arbor	W 109-75	19–7	WSU PE Building; Fairborn, OH
NCAA tournament
Feb 26, 1979		at Northern Michigan; NCAA Division II Great Lakes Regional	W 75-66	20–7	Marquette, MI
Dec 11, 1978		vs. St. Joseph’s (IN); NCAA Division II Great Lakes Regional	L 68-73	20-8	Marquette, MI
*Non-conference game. ^{#}Rankings from AP Poll. (#) Tournament seedings in parentheses. MW=Midwest.

== Awards and honors ==
Bob Schaefer	MVP
Bob Cook	Raider Award

== Statistics ==
Number	Name	Games	Average	Points	Assists	Rebounds
35	Bob Schaefer	26	14.1	367	29	121
_	Jimmy Carter	28	13.0	364	27	150
_	Alan Crowe	25	12.7	317	109	67
30	Bill Wilson	28	10.3	288	92	61
22	Bob Cook	28	9.7	271	115	106
_	Steve Hartings	26	8.7	225	119	28
_	Jeff Bragg	23	5.7	130	21	58
_	Tom Holzapfel	11	4.5	49	7	16
_	Vince Shively	15	4.2	63	20	16
_	Mike Zimmerman	28	3.8	105	32	37
_	James Pinkney	27	3.5	95	10	85
33	Dan Huguely	21	3.0	63	12	38
40	Joe Fitzpatrick	9	2.7	24	3	23
