= Bill Edwards (basketball) =

American basketball player (born 1971)

Personal information
- Born: September 22, 1971 (age 55) Middletown, Ohio, U.S.
- Listed height: 6 ft 8 in (2.03 m)
- Listed weight: 215 lb (98 kg; 15.4 st)

Career information
- High school: Carlisle (Carlisle, Ohio)
- College: Wright State (1989–1993)
- NBA draft: 1993: undrafted
- Playing career: 1993–2006
- Position: Small forward / power forward
- Number: 40

Career history
- 1993–1994: Sioux Falls Skyforce
- 1994: Philadelphia 76ers
- 1994–1995: Scaligera Basket Verona
- 1995–1996: Cagiva Varese
- 1996–1997: AEK Athens
- 1997–1998: Calze Pompea Roma
- 1998–1999: Kinder Bologna
- 1999–2000: PAOK Thessaloniki
- 2000–2001: ASVEL Villeurbanne
- 2002: PAOK Thessaloniki
- 2002: Casademont Girona
- 2003: Hapoel Jerusalem
- 2004–2005: Koln Rein Energy
- 2005–2006: EWE Baskets Oldenburg

Career highlights
- Italian Cup winner (1999); 2× Greek League All-Star (1996 II, 1999); French Cup winner (2001); French League Foreign MVP (2001); German Cup winner (2005); CBA All-Rookie First Team (1994); Mid-Con Player of the Year (1993); 2× First-team All-Mid-Con (1992, 1993); Mid-Con tournament MVP (1993)
- Stats at NBA.com
- Stats at Basketball Reference

William Allen Edwards (born August 28, 1971) is an American former professional basketball player. He was a 2.03 m (6 ft 8 in) tall small forward-power forward. During his playing career, his nickname was "Dollar Bill" Edwards.

== College career ==
Edwards played college basketball at Wright State University, with the Wright State Raiders, where he became one of the school's legends. He was voted the Summit League Player of the Year in 1993.

== Professional career ==
Edwards was never drafted by an NBA franchise. He spent his rookie season with the Sioux Falls Skyforce of the Continental Basketball Association (CBA) and was selected to the CBA All-Rookie First Team in 1994. Despite having played a few games with the Philadelphia 76ers during the 1993–94 season, it was in Europe that he had a significant 12-year career. He played in the EuroLeague with the Greek club PAOK, in the 1999–00 season, and in the FIBA SuproLeague, with the French club ASVEL, in the 2000–01 season.

== National team career ==
Edwards was a member of the bronze medal-winning senior men's Team USA at the 1998 FIBA World Championship.

== Personal life ==
Edwards is the father of former Middletown High School standouts Bill Edwards Jr., who on May 6, 2009, signed a Letter of Intent to play college basketball for Penn State, and Vincent Edwards, a former NBA player, who played college basketball for Purdue.

== Career pro stats (national domestic leagues) ==
Season	League	Team	GP	MPG	PPG	RPG	APG
1993–94	CBA	Sioux Falls Skyforce	52	35.2	20.2	7.1	2.3
1993–94	NBA	Philadelphia 76ers	3	14.7	2.0	4.7	1.3
1994–95	LBA	Scaligera Verona	27	36.1	19.6	9.0	1.1
1995–96	LBA	Cagiva Varese	34	37.4	23.3	7.2	0.8
1996–97	GBL	AEK Athens	34	35.9	17.8	6.6	2.7
1997–98	LBA	Calze Pompea Roma	25	35.4	20.5	5.1	2.0
1998–99	LBA	Kinder Bologna	15	29.4	14.3	4.6	1.2
1999–00	GBL	PAOK Thessaloniki	26	35.8	15.3	5.9	2.0
2000–01	Pro A	ASVEL Villeurbanne	19	33.8	19.0	5.2	0.0
2001–02	GBL	PAOK Thessaloniki	12	35.2	17.8	5.5	2.0
2002–03	ACB	Casademont Girona	3	14.6	6.0	1.6	0.3
2003–04	ISBL	Hapoel Jerusalem	5	17.6	5.4	3.2	1.2
2004–05	BBL	Koln Rein Energy	33	33.9	16.5	7.8	1.8
2005–06	BBL	EWE Oldenburg	31	30.2	14.4	5.8	1.6
