= 1970–71 Wright State Raiders men's basketball team =

American college basketball season

1970–71 Wright State Raiders men's basketball
- Conference: Independent
- Record: 7–17
- Head coach: John Ross (1st season)
- Assistant coach: Jim Brown
- Home arena: Stebbins High School

The 1970–71 Wright State Raiders men's basketball team represented Wright State University in the 1970–71 NCAA College Division men's basketball season. This was the inaugural varsity season, led by head coach John Ross. They played their home games at Stebbins High School in Riverside, Ohio.

== Background ==
Wright State University was launched in the mid-1960s along with Cleveland State University to add additional public education opportunities in Ohio. Under the leadership of Dr. Brage Golding It became an independent school in 1967, and by 1968 the school decided to launch an athletic department. Dr. Golding asked Don Mohr to lead this effort. Don Mohr later served as athletic director and baseball coach.

After launching one of the first varsity soccer teams in the area, Don Mohr turned his attention to basketball with the belief that varsity basketball would do the most to increase awareness of the new university. He hired John Ross as head basketball coach, who was a successful local high school basketball coach as well as a college scout. In 1969-70 Wright State competed as a junior varsity team, then in the following year Coach Ross led the team on its inaugural campaign. For this 70-71 campaign Coach Ross brought on long-time Wright State coach Jim Brown as his assistant.

These early teams operated without an established history or tradition. Team members washed their own laundry, typically ate cold sandwiches after late-night practices, received limited scholarships, and traveled by van.

== Roster ==
1970–71 Wright State Raiders men's basketball team
Players
Coaches

Pos.	#	Name	Height	Weight	Year	Previous school	Hometown
G	12	Fred Clark	6 ft 2 in (1.88 m)	168 lb (76 kg)	Fr	Roosevelt	Dayton, Ohio
G	13	Greg Cross	6 ft 0 in (1.83 m)	175 lb (79 kg)	Sr	Xenia	Xenia, Ohio
G	20	Mark Donahue	6 ft 2 in (1.88 m)	—	Sr	Fairmont West	Kettering, Ohio
F	21	Bill Fogt	6 ft 3 in (1.91 m)	175 lb (79 kg)	Fr	Piqua	Piqua, Ohio
G	10	Dave Magill	6 ft 0 in (1.83 m)	—	Fr	Belmont	Dayton, Ohio
C	22	Greg McCurdy	6 ft 7 in (2.01 m)	190 lb (86 kg)	Fr	Centerville	Sidney, Ohio
F	25	Jim Minch	6 ft 6 in (1.98 m)	180 lb (82 kg)	Fr	Carroll	Dayton, Ohio,
		Ken Schrier	—	—		Sinclair	Northridge
C	30	Jim Thacker	6 ft 5 in (1.96 m)	—	So	Tecumseh	Clark County
G	24	Mike Tollinger	6 ft 1 in (1.85 m)	—	Fr	Stebbins	Riverside, Ohio
G	23	Tim Walker	6 ft 2 in (1.88 m)	170 lb (77 kg)	Fr	Centerville	Centerville, Ohio
G	14	Dave Wilkerson	—	—	Jr	Shawen Acres	Dayton, Ohio
F	31	Ed Woosley	—	—		Muskingum	Dayton, Ohio

Head coach

- John Ross (Wilmington)

Assistant coach(es)

Jim Brown (Dayton)

Legend

- (C) Team captain
- (S) Suspended
- (I) Ineligible
- (W) Walk-on
- Injured
- Current redshirt

== Schedule and results ==
Date time, TV	Rank^{#}	Opponent^{#}	Result	Record	Site city, state
Regular season
Nov 20, 1970		at Cumberland	L 82-84 ^{3OT}	0–1	Gatliff Memorial Gymnasium; Williamsburg, Kentucky
Nov 21, 1970		at Berea	L 79-96	0–2	Berea, KY
Dec 12, 1970		at Ashland	L 56-85	0–3	Ashland, Ohio
Dec 4, 1970		at Taylor	L 89-102	0–4	Upland, Indiana
Dec 5, 1970		vs. Wilberforce	L 93-101	0–5	Upland, Indiana
Dec 12, 1970		at Findlay	L 67-87	0–6	Findlay, Ohio
Dec 14, 1970		Grand Valley State	W 91-84	1–6	Stebbins High School; Riverside, OH
Dec 15, 1970		vs. Harris Teacher; McKendree Invitational tournament	W 83-63	2–6	Lebanon, Illinois
Dec 16, 1970		vs. Scott AFB; McKendree Invitational tournament	W 68-58	2–6	Lebanon, Illinois
Dec 18, 1970		Cumberland	W 95-93	3–6	Stebbins High School; Riverside, OH
Dec 22, 1970		at Rose-Hulman	W 103-91	4–6	Terre Haute, Indiana
Jan 2, 1971		at Otterbein	L 79-105	4–7	Westerville, Ohio
Jan 16, 1971		Cedarville	L 71-82	4–8	Stebbins High School; Riverside, OH
Jan 20, 1971		at Wilberforce	W 68-67	5–8	Wilberforce, Ohio
Jan 23, 1971		at Rio Grande	L 69-71	5–9	Portsmouth, Ohio
Jan 27, 1971		at Wilmington	L 89-116	5–10	Wilmington, Ohio
Jan 20, 1971		at Northwood	L 76-87	5–11	Midland, Michigan
Feb 6, 1971		Marian (IN)	L 81-82	5–12	Stebbins High School; Riverside, OH
Feb 9, 1971		at St. Joseph’s	L 59-87	5–13	Rensselaer, Indiana
Feb 13, 1971		at Defiance	L 93-105	5–14	Defiance, Ohio
Feb 17, 1971		at Transylvania	L 65-86	5–15	Lexington, Kentucky
Feb 22, 1971		Bellarmine	L 82-84	5–16	Stebbins High School; Riverside, OH
Feb 25, 1971		at Earlham	L 84-89	5-17	Richmond, Indiana
Feb 16, 1971		at Walsh	W 92-83	6–17	North Canton, OH
*Non-conference game. ^{#}Rankings from AP Poll. (#) Tournament seedings in parentheses. MW=Midwest.

== Statistics ==
Number	Name	Average	Points	Rebounds
23	Magill	16.8	420	98
20	Donahue	13.3	334	140
23	Thacker	13.3	333	224
21	Fogt	11.8	296	209
25	Minch	8.8	222	187
12	Clark	6.3	153	60
23	Wilkerson	8.5	94	32
23	Tollinger	3.1	73	40
23	Walker	3.6	55	38
23	Woosley	3.0	48	41
23	Schrier	4.0	8	5
22	McCurdy	2.8	31	33
23	Cross	0.4	4	3
23	Cornett	0.1	1	2

== Awards ==
Mark Donahue	MVP
Bill Fogt	Raider Award
