= Tiffin Dragons =

College sport team in Ohio

- University: Tiffin University
- Conference: Great Midwest Athletic Conference
- NCAA: Division II
- Athletic director: Kelly Daniel
- Location: Tiffin, Ohio
- Varsity teams: 22 (11 men's, 11 women's)
- Football stadium: Frost-Kalnow Stadium
- Basketball arena: Gillmor Student Center
- Baseball stadium: Heminger Field
- Softball stadium: Paradiso Softball Field
- Soccer stadium: Paradiso Soccer Field
- Lacrosse stadium: Frost-Kalnow Stadium
- Tennis venue: PM Gillmor Courts
- Outdoor track and field venue: Paradiso Track Field
- Mascot: Blaze the Dragon
- Nickname: Dragons
- Colors: Dragon green and Tiffin gold
- Website: gotiffindragons.com
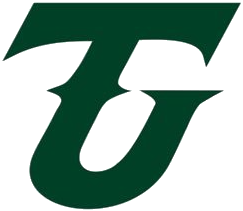

The Tiffin Dragons are the athletic teams that represent Tiffin University, located in Tiffin, Ohio, in NCAA Division II intercollegiate sporting competitions. The Dragons compete as members of the Great Midwest Athletic Conference for varsity sports. Tiffin has been a member of the GMAC since 2018.

== Varsity teams ==
Men's sports	Women's sports
Baseball	Basketball
Basketball	Cross country
Cross country	Esports
Esports	Golf
Football	Lacrosse
Golf	Soccer
Lacrosse	Softball
Soccer	Tennis
Tennis	Track and field
Track and field	Volleyball
Wrestling	Wrestling

== Facilities ==
Venue	Sport(s)	Ref.
Frost-Kalnow Stadium	Football; Lacrosse	
Heminger Field (Note: Part of the "Paradiso Athletic Fields", a sports complex inaugurated in 1997 and composed of a baseball field, two softball fields, two soccer fields, two football practice fields, a full-size turf field, an outdoor track and field practice track, and a cross-country course.)	Baseball	
Paradiso Soccer Field	Soccer	
Paradiso Softball Field	Softball	
PM Gillmor Courts	Tennis	
Paradiso Track Field	Track and field	

== National championships ==
=== Team ===
Association	Division	Sport	Year	Runner-up	Score
NCAA	Division II	Men's Indoor Track and Field (2)	2016	Adams State	49–47 (+2)
NCAA	Division II	Men's Indoor Track and Field (2)	2017	Ashland	63–52 (+11)

== Media ==
Football and basketball broadcasts can be heard on WTUD TUDragonradio.com and Coast Country 100.9 WMJK, featuring broadcast professionals Russell Snyder and Matt Kibler. Full-hour feature programs Dragon Nation and Dragon Nation Live can also be heard on WTUD on the second Monday of each month. Coaches' shows featuring coaches and student-athletes can be heard on weekdays on WTUD.
