= Armory Fieldhouse =

Sports venue in Cincinnati, Ohio

Coordinates: 39.131841°N 84.514084°W

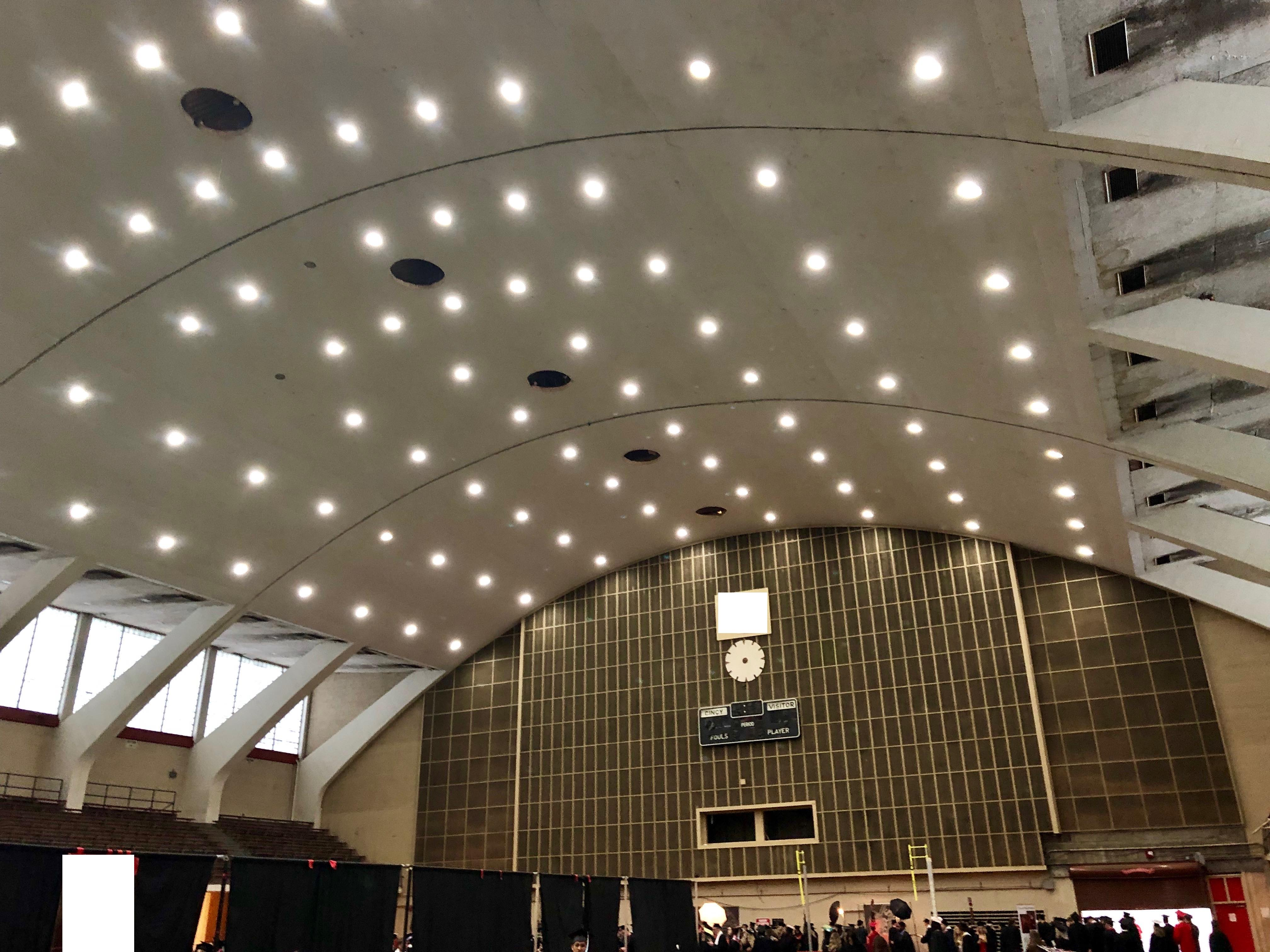
- Interactive map of Armory Fieldhouse
- Location: University of Cincinnati; Cincinnati, OH 45221 USA
- Owner: University of Cincinnati
- Operator: University of Cincinnati
- Capacity: 8,000 (approx.)

Construction
- Opened: December 18, 1954

Tenant
- Cincinnati Bearcats (recreational athletics)

Armory Fieldhouse is an on-campus facility located at the University of Cincinnati. It was built in 1954 to replace the old Schmidlapp Gymnasium, and originally was used as the home for the Bearcats men's basketball team, who opened the building with a 97–65 win over Indiana on December 18, 1954.

It was the home of the team for their two NCAA titles in 1961 and 1962, as well as the site where Oscar Robertson broke the NCAA career scoring record on February 6, 1960, versus Houston. From December 6, 1957, the first home game of the season, to December 7, 1963, when they lost to Kansas, the team went undefeated in the building, a streak of 72 games. During that time, they won every home game played at the Cincinnati Gardens, for an overall streak of 90 straight home wins.

The team's final game at the arena was February 14, 1976, a 60–45 win over Saint Louis University. From 1976 until the opening of the Shoemaker Center (now Fifth Third Arena) in 1989, the team played all their home games off-campus at the Riverfront Coliseum and Cincinnati Gardens. The building was remodeled in the 1980s to become a recreation center for the campus. It is located directly to the north of the Fifth Third Arena, located in (and formerly known as) the Shoemaker Center.

== Notable concerts ==
The Grateful Dead played there on April 3, 1970.

Pink Floyd performed there on 3/8/73, just 7 days after The Dark Side of the Moon was released, though they had already performed the album at the Cincinnati Music Hall on 4/23/72. Billy Joel played his first show in Cincinnati at Armory Fieldhouse on May 7, 1974.
