= 1981 NCAA Division II basketball tournament =

Edition of USA college basketball tournament

- Teams: 32
- Finals site: , Springfield, Massachusetts
- Champions: Florida Southern Moccasins (1st title)
- Runner-up: Mount St. Mary's Mountaineers (2nd title game)
- Semifinalists: Cal Poly Mustangs (1st Final Four); Green Bay Phoenix (3rd Final Four)
- Winning coach: Hal Wissel (1st title)
- MOP: John Ebeling (Florida Southern)
- Attendance: 64,659

The 1981 NCAA Division II basketball tournament involved 32 schools playing in a single-elimination tournament to determine the national champion of men's NCAA Division II college basketball as a culmination of the 1980–81 NCAA Division II men's basketball season. It was won by Florida Southern College and Florida Southern's John Ebeling was the Most Outstanding Player.

1981 NCAA Division II Men's sites - regionals (cyan) Quarterfinals (orange) Final Four (red)

== Regional participants ==
School	Outcome
Cheyney	Third Place
Elizabeth City State	Runner-up
Mount St. Mary's	Regional Champion
Randolph–Macon	Fourth Place

School	Outcome
Indiana State–Evansville	Fourth Place
Northern Michigan	Regional Champion
Western Illinois	Runner-up
Wright State	Third Place

School	Outcome
Central Missouri State	Fourth Place
Green Bay	Regional Champion
North Dakota	Runner-up
North Dakota State	Third Place

School	Outcome
Jacksonville State	Third Place
Lincoln (MO)	Fourth Place
North Alabama	Regional Champion
NE Missouri State	Runner-up

School	Outcome
Chico State	Fourth Place
Cal State Dominguez Hills	Runner-up
Eastern Montana	Third Place
Puget Sound	Regional Champion

School	Outcome
Florida Southern	Regional Champion
Morehouse	Fourth Place
UCF	Runner-up
West Georgia	Third Place

School	Outcome
Bloomsburg	Fourth Place
Cal Poly	Regional Champion
Clarion	Runner-up
Monmouth	Third Place

School	Outcome
New Hampshire College	Regional Champion
Sacred Heart	Runner-up
Springfield	Fourth Place
Stonehill	Third Place

*denotes tie

== Regionals ==
=== South Atlantic - Emmitsburg, Maryland ===
Location: Memorial Gym Host: Mount Saint Mary's College and Seminary

Regional semifinals Round of 32; March 6
Mount St. Mary's	81
Cheyney	75
Elizabeth City State	54
Randolph–Macon	53

Regional Final; Sweet 16; March 7
Mount St. Mary's	78
Elizabeth City State	76

- Third Place - Cheyney 76, Randolph-Macon 67

=== Great Lakes - Macomb, Illinois ===
Location: Western Hall Host: Western Illinois University

Regional semifinals Round of 32; March 6
Western Illinois	80
Indiana State–Evansville	73
Northern Michigan	70
Wright State	69

Regional Final; Sweet 16; March 7
Western Illinois	87
Northern Michigan	93

- Third Place - Wright State 96, Indiana State–Evansville 89

=== North Central - Green Bay, Wisconsin ===
Location: Brown County Veterans Memorial Arena Host: University of Wisconsin at Green Bay

Regional semifinals Round of 32; March 6
Green Bay	82
North Dakota State	76
North Dakota	87
Central Missouri State	80

Regional Final; Sweet 16; March 7
Green Bay	72
North Dakota	60

- Third Place - North Dakota State 95, Central Missouri State 87

=== South Central - Florence, Alabama ===
Location: Flowers Hall Host: University of North Alabama

Regional semifinals Round of 32; March 5
North Alabama	67
Lincoln	53
NE Missouri State	82
Jacksonville State	78

Regional Final; Sweet 16; March 6
North Alabama	63
NE Missouri State	59

- Third Place - Jacksonville State 84, Lincoln 66

=== West - Billings, Montana ===
Location: Alterowitz Gym Host: Eastern Montana College

Regional semifinals Round of 32; March 6
Puget Sound	62
Chico State	60
Cal State Dominguez Hills	61
Eastern Montana	52

Regional Final; Sweet 16; March 7
Puget Sound	72
Cal State Dominguez Hills	54

- Third Place - Eastern Montana 54, Chico State 49

=== South - Orlando, Florida ===
Location: UCF Fieldhouse Host: University of Central Florida

Regional semifinals Round of 32; March 6
UCF	94
Morehouse	77
Florida Southern	70
West Georgia	59

Regional Final; Sweet 16; March 7
UCF	71
Florida Southern	73

- Third Place - West Georgia 102, Morehouse 76

=== East - West Long Branch, New Jersey ===
Location: William T. Boylan Gymnasium Host: Monmouth College

Regional semifinals Round of 32; March 6
Clarion	80
Monmouth	78
Cal Poly	71
Bloomsburg	43

Regional Final; Sweet 16; March 7
Clarion	61
Cal Poly	84

- Third Place - Monmouth 79, Bloomsburg 64

=== New England - Manchester, New Hampshire ===
Location: NHC Fieldhouse Host: New Hampshire College

Regional semifinals Round of 32; March 6
New Hampshire College	76
Springfield	75
Sacred Heart	89
Stonehill	86

Regional Final; Sweet 16; March 7
New Hampshire College	81
Sacred Heart	80

- Third Place - Stonehill 79, Springfield 78

*denotes each overtime played

== National Quarterfinals ==
Quarterfinal - Emmitsburg, MD; Elite Eight; March 14
Mount St. Mary's	88
Northern Michigan	74

Quarterfinal - Green Bay, WI; Elite Eight; March 14
North Alabama	39
Wisconsin-Green Bay	65

Quarterfinal - San Luis Obispo, CA; Elite Eight; March 14
New Hampshire College	73
Cal Poly-SLO	77

Quarterfinal - Tacoma, WA; Elite Eight; March 14
Florida Southern	56
Puget Sound	55

== National Finals - Springfield, Massachusetts ==
Location: Springfield Civic Center Hosts: American International College and Springfield College

National semifinals Final Four; March 20
Mount St. Mary's	76
Green Bay	60
Florida Southern	54
Cal Poly	51

National Championship; March 21
Mount St. Mary's	68
Florida Southern	73

- Third Place - Cal Poly 62, Green Bay 61**

*denotes each overtime played

== All-tournament team ==
- Jay Bruchak (Mount Saint Mary's)
- John Ebeling (Florida Southern)
- Mike Hayes (Florida Southern)
- Durelle Lewis (Mount Saint Mary's)
- Jim Rowe (Mount Saint Mary's)

== See also ==
- 1981 NCAA Division I basketball tournament
- 1981 NCAA Division III basketball tournament
- 1981 NAIA men's basketball tournament

== Sources ==
- 2010 NCAA Men's Basketball Championship Tournament Records and Statistics: Division II men's basketball Championship
- 1981 NCAA Division II men's basketball tournament jonfmorse.com
