= Green Bay Phoenix men's basketball statistical leaders =

The Green Bay Phoenix men's basketball statistical leaders are individual statistical leaders of the Green Bay Phoenix men's basketball program in various categories, including points, rebounds, assists, steals, and blocks. Within those areas, the lists identify single-game, single-season, and career leaders. The Phoenix represent University of Wisconsin–Green Bay in the NCAA's Horizon League.

Green Bay began competing in intercollegiate basketball in 1969. The NCAA did not officially record assists as a stat until the 1983–84 season, and blocks and steals until the 1985–86 season, but Green Bay's record books includes players in these stats before these seasons. These lists are updated through the end of the 2020–21 season.

== Scoring ==
Career
Rank	Player	Points	Seasons
1	Tony Bennett	2285	1988–89 1989–90 1990–91 1991–92
2	Keifer Sykes	2096	2011–12 2012–13 2013–14 2014–15
3	Dennis Woelffer	1916	1969–70 1970–71 1971–72 1972–73
4	Jeff Nordgaard	1911	1992–93 1993–94 1994–95 1995–96
5	Ron Ripley	1751	1975–76 1976–77 1977–78 1978–79
6	Alec Brown	1678	2010–11 2011–12 2012–13 2013–14
	Rahmon Fletcher	1678	2007–08 2008–09 2009–10 2010–11
8	Mike Schachtner	1667	2005–06 2006–07 2007–08 2008–09
9	Richard Sims	1619	1983–84 1984–85 1985–86 1986–87 1987–88
10	Tom Anderson	1505	1974–75 1975–76 1976–77 1977–78

Season
Rank	Player	Points	Season
1	Ray Willis	802	1970–71
2	Sandy Cohen III	666	2018–19
3	Jeff Nordgaard	655	1995–96
	Tony Bennett	655	1990–91
5	Carrington Love	623	2015–16
6	Keifer Sykes	614	2014–15
7	Keifer Sykes	608	2013–14
8	Tony Bennett	605	1991–92
9	Khalil Small	602	2017–18
10	Ray Willis	589	1969–70

Single game
Rank	Player	Points	Season	Opponent
1	Ray Willis	45	1970–71	UW-Parkside
2	Tony Bennett	44	1988–89	Cleveland State
3	Tony Bennett	41	1988–89	Loyola-Marymount
	Ray Willis	41	1970–71	Milton
5	Alec Brown	40	2013–14	Fairfield
6	Carrington Love	39	2015–16	Youngstown St
	Noah Reynolds	39	2023–24	Wright State
8	Jeff Nordgaard	38	1995–96	Detroit
9	Jeff Nordgaard	37	1995–96	UIC
	Tony Bennett	37	1991–92	Eastern Illinois
	Keifer Sykes	36	2014–15	UIC
	Troy Cotton	36	2009–10	Akron
	Ryan Tillema	36	2008–09	Valparaiso
	Mike Schachtner	36	2006–07	Chicago State
	Tony Bennett	36	1991–92	Manhattan
	Tony Bennett	36	1990–91	Western Illinois
	Ray Willis	36	1970–71	Winona State
	Ray Willis	36	1970–71	Milton
	Ray Willis	36	1969–70	Michigan Tech
	Kameron Hankerson	36	2017–18	Detroit Mercy
	Sandy Cohen III	36	2017–18	Oakland

== Rebounds ==
Career
Rank	Player	Rebounds	Seasons
1	Jordan Fouse	1034	2012–13 2013–14 2014–15 2015–16
2	Dennis Woelffer	947	1969–70 1970–71 1971–72 1972–73
3	Ron Ripley	852	1975–76 1976–77 1977–78 1978–79
4	Alec Brown	800	2010–11 2011–12 2012–13 2013–14
5	Terry Evans	766	2004–05 2005–06 2006–07 2007–08 2008–09
6	Nate Barnes	760	1980–81 1981–82 1982–83
7	Jeff Nordgaard	701	1992–93 1993–94 1994–95 1995–96
8	Randy Berry	695	2006–07 2007–08 2008–09 2009–10
9	James Bardney	680	1970–71 1971–72 1972–73 1973–74
10	Bryan Boettcher	659	1974–75 1975–76 1976–77 1977–78

Season
Rank	Player	Rebounds	Season
1	Nate Barnes	373	1980–81
2	Charles Lorenzi	313	1979–80
3	Jordan Fouse	300	2015–16
4	Dennis Woelffer	284	1970–71
5	Randy Berry	283	2009–10
6	James Bardney	280	1972–73
7	Jordan Fouse	268	2012–13
8	Dennis Woelffer	260	1971–72
9	Greg Babcock	252	2002–03
10	James Bardney	251	1973–74

Single game
Rank	Player	Rebounds	Season	Opponent
1	Nate Barnes	21	1982–83	Central Michigan
2	Dennis Woelffer	20	1970–71	St. Norbert
3	Brennan Cougill	19	2011–12	Idaho
	Greg Babcock	19	2002–03	Loyola
	Greg Babcock	19	2002–03	Milwaukee
	Nate Barnes	19	1980–81	UW-Stevens Point
7	Nate Barnes	18	1982–83	Eastern Illinois
	Nate Barnes	18	1982–83	Northern Iowa
	Nate Barnes	18	1980–81	North Dakota
	Nate Barnes	18	1980–81	Cheyney State
	Ray Willis	18	1969–70	St. Norbert
	Ray Willis	18	1969–70	Mount St. Paul

== Assists ==
Career
Rank	Player	Assists	Seasons
1	Tony Bennett	601	1988–89 1989–90 1990–91 1991–92
2	Tom Anderson	560	1974–75 1975–76 1976–77 1977–78
3	Keifer Sykes	526	2011–12 2012–13 2013–14 2014–15
4	Gary Grzesk	496	1992–93 1993–94 1994–95 1995–96
5	Frank Nardi	471	1984–85 1985–86 1986–87 1987–88
6	Rahmon Fletcher	438	2007–08 2008–09 2009–10 2010–11
7	Paul Anderson	409	1978–79 1979–80 1980–81 1981–82
8	John Martinez	408	1989–90 1990–91 1991–92 1993–94
9	Terry Schott	400	1969–70 1970–71 1971–72 1972–73
10	Jordan Fouse	397	2012–13 2013–14 2014–15 2015–16

Season
Rank	Player	Assists	Season
1	Tom Anderson	193	1976–77
2	Javier Mendiburu	184	2004–05
3	Preston Ruedinger	183	2025–26
4	Luke Kiss	179	1998–99
5	Sandy Cohen III	177	2018–19
6	Ryan Evanochko	173	2006–07
7	Frank Nardi	165	1985–86
8	Ryan Evanochko	160	2005–06
9	Tony Bennett	154	1991–92
	Tony Bennett	154	1990–91

Single game
Rank	Player	Assists	Season	Opponent
1	Frank Nardi	19	1985–86	Northern Iowa
2	Ryan Evanochko	16	2006–07	Chicago State
3	Ryan Evanochko	14	2005–06	UIC
	Javier Mendiburu	14	2004–05	Weber State
	Gary Grzesk	14	1995–96	UIC
	Pat Joyce	14	1974–75	Northern Illinois
7	Preston Ruedinger	13	2025–26	UC Santa Barbara
	Javier Mendiburu	13	2004–05	UIC
	Frank Nardi	13	1986–87	Eastern Washington
	Frank Nardi	13	1985–86	Cleveland State

== Steals ==
Career
Rank	Player	Steals	Seasons
1	Jordan Fouse	264	2012–13 2013–14 2014–15 2015–16
2	Terry Evans	237	2004–05 2005–06 2006–07 2007–08 2008–09
3	Carrington Love	206	2012–13 2013–14 2014–15 2015–16
4	Rahmon Fletcher	197	2007–08 2008–09 2009–10 2010–11
5	Frank Nardi	176	1984–85 1985–86 1986–87 1987–88
6	Ben Johnson	166	1988–89 1989–90 1990–91 1991–92
7	Tony Bennett	161	1988–89 1989–90 1990–91 1991–92
8	Keifer Sykes	155	2011–12 2012–13 2013–14 2014–15
9	Gary Grzesk	154	1992–93 1993–94 1994–95 1995–96
10	B.J. LaRue	136	1996–97 1997–98 1998–99 1999–00

Season
Rank	Player	Steals	Season
1	Carrington Love	95	2015–16
2	Jordan Fouse	77	2015–16
3	Sandy Cohen III	71	2018–19
4	Jordan Fouse	68	2013–14
5	Terry Evans	67	2008–09
6	Jordan Fouse	64	2014–15
7	Rahmon Fletcher	60	2008–09
8	Terry Evans	59	2007–08
9	Frank Nardi	57	1986–87
10	Terry Evans	56	2006–07

Single game
Rank	Player	Steals	Season	Opponent
1	Tevin Findlay	9	2016–17	St. Mary’s (MN)
2	Jordan Fouse	8	2013–14	Virginia
3	Carrington Love	7	2015–16	Cleveland State
	Carrington Love	7	2015–16	Cleveland State
	Jordan Fouse	7	2012–13	Loyola
	Benito Flores	7	2004–05	Cleveland State
	Benito Flores	7	2004–05	Weber State
8	Jordan Fouse	6	2013–14	Pepperdine
	Terry Evans	6	2006–07	Bowling Green
	Kevin Olm	6	1997–98	Miami (Ohio)
	John Martinez	6	1993–94	California
	Ben Johnson	6	1991–92	Chicago State
	John Martinez	6	1990–91	Colorado
	Tony Bennett	6	1989–90	Michigan Tech

== Blocks ==
Career
Rank	Player	Blocks	Seasons
1	Alec Brown	309	2010–11 2011–12 2012–13 2013–14
2	Jordan Fouse	183	2012–13 2013–14 2014–15 2015–16
3	Kenneth Lowe	137	2013–14 2014–15 2015–16 2016–17
4	Terry Evans	132	2004–05 2005–06 2006–07 2007–08 2008–09
5	Larry Hill	112	1988–89 1989–90 1990–91 1991–92
6	Matt Hill	111	1995–96 1996–97 1997–98 1998–99
7	Greg Mays	108	2011–12 2012–13 2013–14 2014–15
8	Mike King	90	1999–00 2000–01 2002–03 2003–04
9	Randy Berry	81	2006–07 2007–08 2008–09 2009–10
10	Greg Babcock	72	1999–00 2000–01 2001–02 2002–03

Season
Rank	Player	Blocks	Season
1	Alec Brown	94	2013–14
2	Alec Brown	89	2011–12
3	Alec Brown	67	2010–11
4	Alec Brown	59	2012–13
5	Jordan Fouse	49	2012–13
	Jordan Fouse	49	2015–16
7	Kenneth Lowe	48	2016–17
	Greg Mays	48	2014–15
	Jordan Fouse	48	2013–14
10	Larry Hill	47	1991–92
	Terry Evans	47	2006–07

Single game
Rank	Player	Blocks	Season	Opponent
1	Alec Brown	11	2011–12	Wright State
2	Alec Brown	10	2013–14	Minnesota Duluth
3	Alec Brown	8	2010–11	North Dakota
4	Nate Barnes	7	1982–83	Northern Iowa
5	Alec Brown	6	2013–14	St. Francis
	Alec Brown	6	2012–13	Cleveland State
	Alec Brown	6	2010–11	Minnesota Duluth
	Alec Brown	6	2010–11	Wright State
	Terry Evans	6	2006–07	Cleveland State
	Matt Hill	6	1998–99	Bowling Green
	Larry Hill	6	1989–90	Southern Illinois
	Scott LeMoine	6	1990–91	Central Michigan
