= 1994–95 Green Bay Phoenix men's basketball team =

American college basketball season

1994–95 Green Bay Phoenix men's basketball

Midwestern Collegiate Conference Champions

NCAA tournament, first round
- Conference: Midwestern Collegiate Conference
- Record: 22–8 (11–4 MCC)
- Head coach: Dick Bennett (10th season)
- Assistant coach: Mike Heideman (9th season)
- Home arena: Brown County Veterans Memorial Arena

1994–95 Midwestern Collegiate Conference men's basketball standings
	Conf.				Overall
Team	W		L	PCT	W		L	PCT
Xavier	14	–	0	1.000	23	–	5	.821
Illinois-Chicago	11	–	4	.733	18	–	9	.667
WI-Green Bay †	11	–	4	.733	22	–	8	.733
Detroit Mercy	9	–	5	.643	13	–	15	.464
La Salle	7	–	7	.500	13	–	14	.481
Northern Illinois	7	–	8	.467	19	–	10	.655
Wright State	6	–	8	.429	13	–	17	.433
Cleveland State	3	–	11	.214	10	–	17	.370
UW-Milwaukee	2	–	13	.133	3	–	24	.111
Loyola (IL)	2	–	13	.133	5	–	22	.185
† 1995 MCC tournament winner Rankings from AP Poll

The 1994–95 Green Bay Phoenix men's basketball team represented the University of Wisconsin–Green Bay in the 1994–95 NCAA Division I men's basketball season. Their head coach was Dick Bennett. They were the champions of the Mid-Continent Basketball tournament and earned the conference's automatic bid in the NCAA Tournament. Playing as the No. 14 seed in the Midwest region, the Phoenix lost to No. 3 seed Purdue in the first round, 49–48. Green Bay finished the season 22–8 (11–4 MCC).

== Roster ==
1994–95 Green Bay Phoenix men's basketball team
Players	Coaches
Pos. / # / Name / Height / Weight / Year / Previous school / Hometown; F / 33 / Jeff Nordgaard / 6 ft 7 in (2.01 m) / 255 lb (116 kg) / Jr / Dawson-Boyd / Dawson, Minnesota	Head coach: Dick Bennett; Assistant coach(es) Legend: (C) Team captain; (S) Suspended; (I) Ineligible; (W) Walk-on; Injured; Current redshirt; Roster

== Schedule ==
Date time, TV	Rank^{#}	Opponent^{#}	Result	Record	Site city, state
Regular season
Nov 26, 1994*		at Oregon	L 71–96	0–1	McArthur Court (5,647); Eugene, Oregon
Nov 28, 1994*		at Idaho State	L 81–87 ^{OT}	0–2	Holt Arena (4,560); Pocatello, Idaho
Nov 30, 1994*		at No. 13 Wisconsin	L 57–61	0–3	Wisconsin Field House (11,340); Madison, Wisconsin
Dec 3, 1994*		at Illinois State	W 64–58	1–3	Redbird Arena (6,607); Normal, Illinois
Dec 17, 1994*		Bowling Green	W 69–62	2–3	Brown County Arena (5,646); Ashwaubenon, Wisconsin
Dec 19, 1994*		Morgan State	W 76–45	3–3	Brown County Arena (5,174); Ashwaubenon, Wisconsin
Dec 22, 1994*		Mississippi Valley State	W 75–53	4–3	Brown County Arena (5,154); Ashwaubenon, Wisconsin
Dec 28, 1994*		Butler	L 43–56	4–4	Brown County Arena (5,401); Ashwaubenon, Wisconsin
Dec 30, 1994*		Indiana State	W 74–53	5–4	Brown County Arena (5,604); Ashwaubenon, Wisconsin
Dec 31, 1994*		Canisius	W 62–45	6–4	Brown County Arena (5,344); Ashwaubenon, Wisconsin
Jan 5, 1995*		Northern Illinois	W 62–57	7–4	Brown County Arena (5,406); Ashwaubenon, Wisconsin
Jan 7, 1995*		at Marquette	W 50–48	8–4	Bradley Center (12,438); Milwaukee, Wisconsin
Jan 9, 1995*		Cleveland State	W 70–58	9–4	Brown County Arena (5,384); Ashwaubenon, Wisconsin
Mid-Continent Conference tournament
NCAA tournament
Mar 17, 1995*	(14 MW)	vs. (3 MW) No. 12 Purdue; First round	L 48–49	22–8	Frank Erwin Center (15,375); Austin, Texas
*Non-conference game. ^{#}Rankings from AP Poll. (#) Tournament seedings in parentheses. MW=Midwest.
