= 1990–91 Northern Illinois Huskies men's basketball team =

American college basketball season

1990–91 Northern Illinois Huskies men's basketball

Mid-Con Regular Season Champions

NCAA tournament, first round
- Conference: Mid-Continent Conference
- Record: 25–6 (14–2 Mid-Con)
- Head coach: Jim Molinari (2nd season)
- Home arena: Chick Evans Field House

1990–91 Mid-Continent Conference men's basketball standings
	Conf.				Overall
Team	W		L	PCT	W		L	PCT
Northern Illinois	14	–	2	.875	25	–	6	.806
Wisconsin–Green Bay †	13	–	3	.813	24	–	7	.774
Eastern Illinois	10	–	6	.625	17	–	12	.586
Cleveland State	8	–	8	.500	12	–	16	.429
Northern Iowa	8	–	8	.500	13	–	19	.406
Western Illinois	6	–	10	.375	13	–	15	.464
Akron	6	–	10	.375	15	–	13	.536
Illinois–Chicago	5	–	11	.313	15	–	15	.500
Valparaiso	2	–	14	.125	5	–	22	.185
† 1991 Mid-Con Tournament winner Rankings from AP Poll

The 1990–91 Northern Illinois Huskies men's basketball team represented Northern Illinois University in the college basketball season of 1990–91. The team, led by head coached by Jim Molinari, were members of the Mid-Continent Conference and played their homes game at the Chick Evans Field House. They finished the season 25–6, 14–2 in Mid-Con play, to win the Mid-Con regular season title. After falling to Wisconsin-Green Bay in the 1991 Mid-Con men's basketball tournament, they received an at-large invitation to the 1991 NCAA tournament.

== Roster ==
1990–91 Northern Illinois Huskies men's basketball team
Players
Coaches

Pos.	#	Name	Height	Weight	Year	Hometown
G	10	Donald Whiteside	5 ft 10 in (1.78 m)	160 lb (73 kg)	Sr	Chicago, Illinois
F	44	Donnell Thomas	6 ft 4 in (1.93 m)	—	Sr	Chicago, Illinois

Head coach

- Jim Molinari

Assistant coach(es)

Legend

- (C) Team captain
- (S) Suspended
- (I) Ineligible
- (W) Walk-on
- Injured
- Current redshirt

== Schedule and results ==
Date time, TV	Rank^{#}	Opponent^{#}	Result	Record	Site city, state
Regular season
Nov 27, 1990*		at Maine	W 65–51	1–0	Alfond Arena; Orono, Maine
Dec 1, 1990*		at Minnesota	L 37–65	1–1	Williams Arena; Minneapolis, Minnesota
Dec 4, 1990*		Evansville	W 77–51	2–1	Chick Evans Field House; DeKalb, Illinois
Jan 15, 1991*		DePaul	W 70–61	12–1	Chick Evans Field House; DeKalb, Illinois
Jan 19, 1991		Green Bay	L 57–63	12–2	Chick Evans Field House (6,060); DeKalb, Illinois
Feb 16, 1991		at Green Bay	L 53–61		Brown County Arena (6,279); Green Bay, Wisconsin
Feb 18, 1991*		at No. 17 Nebraska	L 73–82		Bob Devaney Sports Center; Lincoln, Nebraska
Mid-Con Tournament
Mar 3, 1991*	(1)	vs. UIC; Quarterfinal	W 77–52	23–4	Brown County Arena; Green Bay, Wisconsin
Mar 4, 1991*	(1)	vs. Northern Iowa; Semifinal	W 76–63 ^{OT}	24–4	Brown County Arena; Green Bay, Wisconsin
Mar 5, 1991*	(1)	at (2) Green Bay; Championship Game	L 39–56	24–5	Brown County Arena (6,197); Green Bay, Wisconsin
NCAA Tournament
Mar 15, 1991*	(13 MW)	vs. (4 MW) No. 20 St. John's; First Round	L 68–75	25–6	UD Arena; Dayton, Ohio
*Non-conference game. ^{#}Rankings from AP poll. (#) Tournament seedings in parentheses. MW=Midwest.
