= 1993–94 Wright State Raiders men's basketball team =

American college basketball season

1993–94 Wright State Raiders men's basketball
- Conference: Mid-Continent
- Record: 12–18 (9–9 Mid-Continent)
- Head coach: Ralph Underhill (16th season)
- Assistant coaches: Jim Brown; Jim Ehler; Jack Butler
- Home arena: Nutter Center

1993–94 Mid-Continent Conference men's basketball standings
	Conf.				Overall
Team	W		L	PCT	W		L	PCT
Wisconsin–Green Bay †	15	–	3	.833	27	–	7	.794
Illinois–Chicago	14	–	4	.778	20	–	9	.690
Valparaiso	14	–	4	.778	20	–	8	.714
Cleveland State	9	–	9	.500	14	–	15	.483
Wright State	9	–	9	.500	12	–	18	.400
Eastern Illinois	7	–	11	.389	12	–	15	.444
Northern Illinois	7	–	11	.389	10	–	17	.370
Wisconsin–Milwaukee	7	–	11	.389	10	–	17	.370
Western Illinois	5	–	13	.278	7	–	20	.259
Youngstown State	3	–	15	.167	5	–	21	.192
† 1994 Mid-Con Tournament winner Rankings from AP Poll

The 1993–94 Wright State Raiders men's basketball team represented Wright State University in the 1993–94 NCAA NCAA Division I men's basketball season led by head coach Ralph Underhill.

== Season summary ==
The 1993–94 season followed the previous year’s conference tournament championship and NCAA appearance. The team, led by star center Mike Nahar, was low-scoring and competitive but finished in the middle of the standings.

== Roster ==
1993–94 Wright State Raiders men's basketball team
Players
Coaches

Pos.	#	Name	Height	Weight	Year	Previous school	Hometown
G	23	Scott Blair	6 ft 1 in (1.85 m)	170 lb (77 kg)	Sr	Westerville North	Westerville, OH
F	33	Sean Hammonds	6 ft 5 in (1.96 m)	220 lb (100 kg)	Sr	Pleasure Ridge Park	Louisville, KY
G	30	Andy Holderman	6 ft 1 in (1.85 m)	170 lb (77 kg)	Sr	Manchester	North Manchester, Indiana
F	43	Dan Skeoch	6 ft 7 in (2.01 m)	210 lb (95 kg)	Sr	Anderson	Anderson, IN
C	52	Mike Nahar	7 ft 0 in (2.13 m)	250 lb (113 kg)	RS Sr	Dutch National Jr. Team	Alkmaar
F	31	Quincy Brann	6 ft 5 in (1.96 m)	195 lb (88 kg)	Jr	Highland (KS) Junior College	Flint, MI
F	24	Sterling Collins	6 ft 2 in (1.88 m)	195 lb (88 kg)	Jr	Beecher	Flint, MI
G	35	John Ramey	6 ft 3 in (1.91 m)	180 lb (82 kg)	Jr	Western Boone	Thorntown, IN
G	34	Eric Wills	6 ft 2 in (1.88 m)	185 lb (84 kg)	Jr	Chaminade-Julienne	Dayton, OH
G	21	Darryl Woods	6 ft 0 in (1.83 m)	175 lb (79 kg)	Jr	Central (KS) Junior College	Gary, IN
F	32	Delme Herriman	6 ft 7 in (2.01 m)	180 lb (82 kg)	RS So	Claymont	Manchester, England
F	44	Jason Smith	6 ft 7 in (2.01 m)	225 lb (102 kg)	So	Country Day	Cincinnati, OH
F	40	Mike Conner	6 ft 7 in (2.01 m)	220 lb (100 kg)	Fr	Malden	Malden, MA
G	22	Rick Martinez	6 ft 1 in (1.85 m)	170 lb (77 kg)	Fr	Ambassador Christian	Fontana, CA
G	20	Rob Welch	6 ft 1 in (1.85 m)	165 lb (75 kg)	Fr	Wayne Trace	Haviland, OH

Head coach

- Ralph Underhill

Assistant coach(es)

Jim Brown, Jim Ehler, Jack Butler

Legend

- (C) Team captain
- (S) Suspended
- (I) Ineligible
- (W) Walk-on
- Injured
- Current redshirt

== Schedule and results ==
Date time, TV	Rank^{#}	Opponent^{#}	Result	Record	Site city, state
Nov 26, 1993*		vs. East Tennessee St. San Juan Shootout	L 81-92	0–1	Eugenio Guerra Sports Complex; San Juan, PR
Nov 27, 1993*		at American PR; San Juan Shootout	L 61-68	0–2	Eugenio Guerra Sports Complex; San Juan, PR
Nov 28, 1993*		vs. Pacific; San Juan Shootout	L 94-99	0–3	Eugenio Guerra Sports Complex; San Juan, PR
Dec 4, 1993*		John Carroll	W 84-79	1-3	Nutter Center; Fairborn, OH
Dec 8, 1993*		at Miami (OH)	L 53-87	1–4	Millett Assembly Hall; Oxford, OH
Dec 11, 1993*		at Dayton; Gem City Jam	L 56-83	1-5	UD Arena; Dayton, OH
Dec 14, 1993*		at Eastern Kentucky	L 55-75	1–6	Alumni Coliseum; Richmond, KY
Dec 17, 1993*		Prairie View A&M; USAir Classic	W 80–64	2–6	Nutter Center; Fairborn, OH
Dec 18, 1993*		Louisiana-Monroe; USAir Classic	L 79–91	2–7	Nutter Center; Fairborn, OH
Dec 22, 1993*		Ohio	L 63–78	2–8	Nutter Center; Fairborn, OH
Jan 5, 1994		Cleveland State	L 77-84	2–9	Nutter Center; Fairborn, OH
Jan 8, 1994*		Dayton; Gem City Jam	W 77-65	3-9	UD Arena; Fairborn, OH
Jan 10, 1994		Youngstown State	W 79-73	4-9	Nutter Center; Fairborn, OH
Jan 15, 1994		at Western Illinois	W 81-60	5–9	Western Hall; Macomb, IL
Jan 17, 1994		Valparaiso	L 59-63	5–10	Athletics–Recreation Center; Valparaiso, IN
Jan 22, 1994		Green Bay	W 53-51	6-10	Nutter Center; Fairborn, OH
Jan 24, 1994		at Northern Illinois	L 68-77	6-11	Chick Evans Field House; DeKalb, IL
Jan 27, 1994		Eastern Illinois	L 62-63	6-12	Nutter Center; Fairborn, OH
Jan 29, 1994		at UIC	L 85-109	4-13	UIC Pavilion; Chicago, IL
Feb 1, 1994		Milwaukee	L 80-95	4-14	Nutter Center; Fairborn, OH
Feb 5, 1994		Western Illinois	W 87-73	5-14	Nutter Center; Fairborn, OH
Feb 7, 1994		Valparaiso	L 68-75	5–15	Nutter Center; Fairborn, OH
Feb 12, 1994		at Cleveland State	W 69-68	6-15	CSU Convocation Center; Cleveland, OH
Feb 14, 1994		at Youngstown State	W 88-78	7-15	Beeghly Center; Youngstown, OH
Feb 19, 1994		UIC	L 70-86	7-16	Nutter Center; Fairborn, OH
Feb 22, 1994		at Milwaukee	W 89-87	8-16	Baker Fieldhouse; Milwaukee, WI
Feb 24, 1994		at Eastern Illinois	W 77-68	9-16	Lantz Fieldhouse; Charleston, Illinois
Feb 26, 1994		at Green Bay	L 46-80	9-17	Brown County Veterans Memorial Arena; Green Bay, WI
Mar 1, 1994		Northern Illinois	W 71-66	10-17	Nutter Center; Fairborn, OH
Mid-Continent tournament
Mar 6, 1994	(5)	vs. (4) Cleveland State; Quarterfinals	L 70-79	10-18	Rosemont Horizon; Rosemont, IL
*Non-conference game. ^{#}Rankings from AP Poll. (#) Tournament seedings in parentheses. MW=Midwest.

== Awards and honors ==
Mike Nahar	MVP
Delme Herriman	Raider Award
Mike Nahar	All-Mid-Continent Conference

== Statistics ==
Number	Name	Games	Average	Points	Assists	Rebounds
52	Mike Nahar	30	15.4	463	44	200
33	Sean Hammonds	30	14.5	435	32	234
30	Andy Holderman	30	11.5	345	62	56
32	Delme Herriman	27	9.0	243	42	108
20	Rob Welch	29	6.1	176	78	71
21	Darryl Woods	29	4.7	136	40	51
40	Mike Conner	27	5.0	134	13	55
22	Rick Martinez	29	2.6	76	48	117
44	Jason Smith	26	2.8	73	7	62
35	Jon Ramey	16	1.9	31	8	14
31	Quincy Bran	11	2.0	22	2	4
34	Eric Wills	8	1.4	11	1	2
43	Dan Skeoch	2	3.5	7	0	3
23	Scott Blair	5	1.0	5	1	2
23	Sterling Collins	6	0.3	2	1	2
