= 1994–95 Xavier Musketeers men's basketball team =

American college basketball season

1994–95 Xavier Musketeers men's basketball

MCC Regular season champions

NCAA tournament, first round
- Conference: Midwestern Collegiate Conference
- Record: 23–5 (14–0 MCC)
- Head coach: Skip Prosser (1st season)
- Home arena: Cincinnati Gardens

1994–95 Midwestern Collegiate Conference men's basketball standings
	Conf.				Overall
Team	W		L	PCT	W		L	PCT
Xavier	14	–	0	1.000	23	–	5	.821
Illinois-Chicago	11	–	4	.733	18	–	9	.667
WI-Green Bay †	11	–	4	.733	22	–	8	.733
Detroit Mercy	9	–	5	.643	13	–	15	.464
La Salle	7	–	7	.500	13	–	14	.481
Northern Illinois	7	–	8	.467	19	–	10	.655
Wright State	6	–	8	.429	13	–	17	.433
Cleveland State	3	–	11	.214	10	–	17	.370
UW-Milwaukee	2	–	13	.133	3	–	24	.111
Loyola (IL)	2	–	13	.133	5	–	22	.185
† 1995 MCC tournament winner Rankings from AP Poll

The 1994–95 Xavier Musketeers men's basketball team represented Xavier University from Cincinnati, Ohio as a member of the Midwestern Collegiate Conference during the 1994–95 season. Led by first-year head coach Skip Prosser, the Musketeers finished 23–5 (14–0 MCC) in the regular season, but lost in the quarterfinal round of the MCC tournament. In the NCAA tournament, the Musketeers were defeated by No. 6 seed Georgetown, 68–63, in the opening round.

== Roster ==
1994–95 Xavier Musketeers men's basketball team
Players
Coaches

Pos.	#	Name	Height	Weight	Year	Hometown
G	25	Michael Hawkins	6 ft 0 in (1.83 m)	175 lb (79 kg)	Sr	Canton, Ohio
G	30	Jeff Massey	6 ft 1 in (1.85 m)	—	Sr
F	54	Larry Sykes	6 ft 9 in (2.06 m)	245 lb (111 kg)	Sr	Toledo, Ohio

Head coach

- Skip Prosser

Assistant coach(es)

Legend

- (C) Team captain
- (S) Suspended
- (I) Ineligible
- (W) Walk-on
- Injured
- Current redshirt

== Schedule and results ==
Date time, TV	Rank^{#}	Opponent^{#}	Result	Record	Site city, state
Regular season
Nov 25, 1994*		IUPUI	W 104–67	1–0	Cincinnati Gardens; Cincinnati, Ohio
Nov 30, 1994*		Miami (OH)	W 89–70	2–0	Cincinnati Gardens; Cincinnati, Ohio
Dec 3, 1994*		Loyola (MD)	W 86–51	3–0	Cincinnati Gardens; Cincinnati, Ohio
Dec 5, 1994*		at Virginia Tech	L 55–82	3–1	Cassell Coliseum; Blacksburg, Virginia
Dec 10, 1994*		at Hartford	W 85–68	4–1	Chase Arena at Reich Family Pavilion; Hartford, Connecticut
Dec 17, 1994*		No. 19 Ohio	W 90–71	5–1	Cincinnati Gardens; Cincinnati, Ohio
Dec 19, 1994*		Dayton	W 99–73	6–1	Cincinnati Gardens; Cincinnati, Ohio
Dec 21, 1994*		Cal State Northridge	W 101–65	7–1	Cincinnati Gardens; Cincinnati, Ohio
Dec 28, 1994*		UMBC	W 77–58	8–1	Cincinnati Gardens; Cincinnati, Ohio
Jan 5, 1995		at Cleveland State	W 84–69	9–1 (1–0)	Wolstein Center; Cleveland, Ohio
Jan 7, 1995		at Detroit	W 72–63	10–1 (2–0)	Cobo Arena; Detroit, Michigan
Jan 9, 1995*		at Cincinnati	L 80–87	10–2	Cincinnati Gardens; Cincinnati, Ohio
Jan 14, 1995		La Salle	W 75–72	11–2 (3–0)	Cincinnati Gardens; Cincinnati, Ohio
Jan 18, 1995		at Wright State	W 81–73	12–2 (4–0)	Nutter Center; Fairborn, Ohio
Jan 21, 1995*		at Notre Dame	L 73–84	12–3	Joyce Center; South Bend, Indiana
Jan 26, 1995		Milwaukee	W 96–76	13–3 (5–0)	Cincinnati Gardens; Cincinnati, Ohio
Jan 28, 1995		at Northern Illinois	W 106–84	14–3 (6–0)	Chick Evans Field House; DeKalb, Illinois
Jan 30, 1995		at Loyola (IL)	W 81–75	15–3 (7–0)	Alumni Gym; Chicago, Illinois
Feb 2, 1995		Cleveland State	W 93–75	16–3 (8–0)	Cincinnati Gardens; Cincinnati, Ohio
Feb 4, 1995		Detroit	W 72–65	17–3 (9–0)	Cincinnati Gardens; Cincinnati, Ohio
Feb 9, 1995		at La Salle	W 84–77	18–3 (10–0)	Philadelphia Civic Center; Philadelphia, Pennsylvania
Feb 11, 1995		Green Bay	W 76–55	19–3 (11–0)	Cincinnati Gardens; Cincinnati, Ohio
Feb 15, 1995		Wright State	W 94–84	20–3 (12–0)	Cincinnati Gardens; Cincinnati, Ohio
Feb 18, 1995*		at George Washington	W 88–75	21–3	Charles E. Smith Center; Washington, D.C.
Feb 23, 1995		Illinois–Chicago	W 93–90	22–3 (13–0)	Cincinnati Gardens; Cincinnati, Ohio
Feb 25, 1995		at Butler	W 81–66	23–3 (14–0)	Hinkle Fieldhouse; Indianapolis, Indiana
MCC Tournament
Mar 4, 1995*		at Wright State; Quarterfinals	L 70–71	23–4	Ervin J. Nutter Center; Fairborn, Ohio
NCAA Tournament
Mar 17, 1995*	(11 SE)	vs. (6 SE) No. 22 Georgetown	L 63–68	23–5	Leon County Civic Center (7,875); Tallahassee, Florida
*Non-conference game. ^{#}Rankings from AP poll. (#) Tournament seedings in parentheses. SE=Southeast. All times are in Eastern Time.
