= 1994–95 Wright State Raiders men's basketball team =

American college basketball season

1994–95 Wright State Raiders men's basketball
- Conference: MCC
- Record: 13–17 (6–8 MCC)
- Head coach: Ralph Underhill (17th season)
- Assistant coaches: Jim Brown; Jim Ehler; Jack Butler
- Home arena: Nutter Center

1994–95 Midwestern Collegiate Conference men's basketball standings
	Conf.				Overall
Team	W		L	PCT	W		L	PCT
Xavier	14	–	0	1.000	23	–	5	.821
Illinois-Chicago	11	–	4	.733	18	–	9	.667
WI-Green Bay †	11	–	4	.733	22	–	8	.733
Detroit Mercy	9	–	5	.643	13	–	15	.464
La Salle	7	–	7	.500	13	–	14	.481
Northern Illinois	7	–	8	.467	19	–	10	.655
Wright State	6	–	8	.429	13	–	17	.433
Cleveland State	3	–	11	.214	10	–	17	.370
UW-Milwaukee	2	–	13	.133	3	–	24	.111
Loyola (IL)	2	–	13	.133	5	–	22	.185
† 1995 MCC tournament winner Rankings from AP Poll

The 1994–95 Wright State Raiders men's basketball team represented Wright State University in the 1994–95 NCAA Division I men's basketball season led by head coach Ralph Underhill.

== Season summary ==
The start of a new era, Wright State and five other Mid-Continent teams jumped to the Midwestern Collegiate Conference. This solid conference, which had been the University of Dayton's home through 1992-93 and still counted Xavier as a member, would be Wright State's home for years to come.

== Roster ==
1994–95 Wright State Raiders men's basketball team
Players
Coaches

Pos.	#	Name	Height	Weight	Year	Previous school	Hometown
F	31	Quincy Brann	6 ft 5 in (1.96 m)	180 lb (82 kg)	Sr	Highland (KS) Junior College	Flint, MI
G	35	John Ramey	6 ft 4 in (1.93 m)	180 lb (82 kg)	Sr	Western Boone	Thorntown, IN
G	34	Eric Wills	6 ft 3 in (1.91 m)	200 lb (91 kg)	Sr	Chaminade-Julienne	Dayton, OH
G	21	Darryl Woods	6 ft 0 in (1.83 m)	180 lb (82 kg)	Sr	Central (KS) Junior College	Gary, IN
F	32	Delme Herriman	6 ft 7 in (2.01 m)	180 lb (82 kg)	RS So	Claymont	Manchester, England
F	41	Bilaal Neal	6 ft 6 in (1.98 m)	205 lb (93 kg)	So	Westark JC	Warren, AR
F	44	Jason Smith	6 ft 7 in (2.01 m)	235 lb (107 kg)	Jr	Country Day	Cincinnati, OH
C	45	Keith Blankenship	6 ft 11 in (2.11 m)	210 lb (95 kg)	So	Wayne	Dayton, OH
F	40	Mike Conner	6 ft 7 in (2.01 m)	215 lb (98 kg)	So	Malden	Malden, MA
G	22	Rick Martinez	6 ft 1 in (1.85 m)	170 lb (77 kg)	So	Ambassador Christian	Fontana, CA
F/C	52	Vitaly Potapenko	6 ft 10 in (2.08 m)	270 lb (122 kg)	So	Kiev State University of Physical Culture	Kiev, Ukraine
G	20	Rob Welch	6 ft 2 in (1.88 m)	170 lb (77 kg)	So	Wayne Trace	Haviland, OH
F	33	Antuan Johnson	6 ft 6 in (1.98 m)	215 lb (98 kg)	Fr	Scott	Toledo, OH
F	43	Thad Burton	6 ft 8 in (2.03 m)	240 lb (109 kg)	Fr	St. Charles Prep	Columbus, OH
G	24	Derek Watkins	6 ft 0 in (1.83 m)	165 lb (75 kg)	Fr	Valley View	Germantown, OH

Head coach

- Ralph Underhill

Assistant coach(es)

Jim Brown, Jim Ehler, Jack Butler

Legend

- (C) Team captain
- (S) Suspended
- (I) Ineligible
- (W) Walk-on
- Injured
- Current redshirt

== Schedule and results ==
Date time, TV	Rank^{#}	Opponent^{#}	Result	Record	Site city, state
Nov 26, 1994*		at No. 15 Wisconsin	L 63-86	0–1	Wisconsin Field House; Madison, WI
Nov 30, 1994*		Fairleigh Dickinson	L 62-64	0–2	Nutter Center; Fairborn, OH
Dec 3, 1994*		Wilmington	W 79-61	1–2	Nutter Center; Fairborn, OH
Dec 10, 1994*		Dayton; Gem City Jam	W 74-53	2-2	Nutter Center; Fairborn, OH
Dec 13, 1994*		at No. 19 Ohio	L 56-90	2–3	Convocation Center; Athens, Ohio
Dec 16, 1994*		Prairie View A&M; USAir Classic	W 90–65	3–3	Nutter Center; Fairborn, OH
Dec 17, 1994*		Youngstown State; USAir Classic	L 56-62	3-4	Nutter Center; Fairborn, OH
Dec 21, 1994*		at Fairleigh Dickinson	L 67-91	3–5	Rothman Center; Hackensack, NJ
Dec 22, 1994*		at Manhattan	L 46-69	3–6	Draddy Gymnasium (1,279); Bronx, NY
Dec 30, 1994*		Miami (OH)	L 61-69	3–7	Nutter Center; Fairborn, OH
Jan 3, 1995*		Mississippi Valley St.	W 74-65	4–7	Nutter Center; Fairborn, OH
Jan 5, 1995		at Detroit Mercy	W 78-71	5–7 (1–0)	Cobo Arena; Detroit, MI
Jan 7, 1995		at Cleveland State	W 82-74	6-7 (2–0)	CSU Convocation Center; Cleveland, OH
Jan 12, 1995		La Salle	L 65-74	6-8 (2–1)	Nutter Center; Fairborn, OH
Jan 18, 1995		Xavier	L 73-81	6-9 (2–2)	Nutter Center; Fairborn, OH
Jan 21, 1995		Northern Illinois	L 68-77	6-10 (2–3)	Nutter Center; Fairborn, OH
Jan 26, 1995		at Loyola	L 69-75	6-11 (2–4)	Alumni Gym; Chicago, IL
Jan 28, 1995		at Milwaukee	W 76-74	7-11 (3–4)	Baker Fieldhouse; Milwaukee, WI
Feb 2, 1995		Detroit Mercy	W 79–64	8–11 (4–4)	Nutter Center; Fairborn, OH
Feb 4, 1995		at UIC	L 83-94	8-12 (4–5)	UIC Pavilion; Chicago, IL
Feb 7, 1995*		Virginia Tech	L 74-77	8-13	Nutter Center; Fairborn, OH
Feb 11, 1995		at La Salle	L 90-92	8-14 (4–6)	Philadelphia Civic Center; Philadelphia, PA
Feb 15, 1995		at Xavier	L 84-94	8-15 (4–7)	Cincinnati Gardens; Cincinnati, OH
Feb 19, 1995		Cleveland State	W 78-60	9–15 (5–7)	Nutter Center; Fairborn, OH
Feb 23, 1995		Butler	W 83-79	10–15 (6–7)	Nutter Center; Fairborn, OH
Feb 26, 1995		Green Bay	L 61-75	10-16 (6–8)	Nutter Center; Fairborn, OH
Midwestern Collegiate Tournament
Mar 3, 1995	(8)	(9) Cleveland State; First Round	W 88-81	11-16	Nutter Center; Fairborn, OH
Mar 4, 1995	(8)	(1) No. 25 Xavier; Quarterfinal	W 71-70	12-16	Nutter Center; Fairborn, OH
Mar 5, 1995	(8)	(4) Detroit Mercy; Semifinal	W 76-69	13-16	Nutter Center; Fairborn, OH
Mar 7, 1995	(8)	(3) Green Bay; Final	L 59-73	13-17	Nutter Center; Fairborn, OH
*Non-conference game. ^{#}Rankings from AP Poll. (#) Tournament seedings in parentheses. MW=Midwest.

== Awards and honors ==
Vitaly Potapenko	MVP
Delme Herriman	Raider Award
Vitaly Potapenko	First Team MCC
Vitaly Potapenko	MCC All Newcomer
Vitaly Potapenko	MCC Newcomer of the year
Vitaly Potapenko	MCC All Tournament Team
Rob Welch	MCC All Tournament Team

== Statistics ==
Number	Name	Games	Average	Points	Assists	Rebounds
52	Vitaly Potapenko	30	19.2	575	41	193
20	Rob Welch	30	11.2	355	101	115
32	Delme Herriman	30	9.9	298	73	162
22	Rick Martinez	30	8.4	253	102	97
33	Antuan Johnson	28	6.2	229	45	119
35	Jon Ramey	30	5.7	172	27	52
40	Mike Conner	29	3.9	114	8	68
21	Darryl Woods	29	1.8	51	17	20
31	Quincy Brann	19	2.3	43	8	17
44	Jason Smith	23	1.6	36	6	34
41	Bilaal Neal	16	1.6	26	1	11
43	Thad Burton	15	1.4	21	2	0
24	Derek Watkins	15	0.6	9	1	2
34	Eric Wills	8	0.4	3	3	3
