= 1991 Mid-Continent Conference men's basketball tournament =

- Classification: Division I
- Season: 1990–91
- Teams: 8
- Site: Brown County Veterans Memorial Arena; Ashwaubenon, Wisconsin
- Champions: Wisconsin–Green Bay (1st title)
- Winning coach: Dick Bennett (1st title)
- MVP: Tony Bennett (Wisconsin–Green Bay)
- Mid-Continent Conference men's basketball tournaments

1990–91 Mid-Continent Conference men's basketball standings
	Conf.				Overall
Team	W		L	PCT	W		L	PCT
Northern Illinois	14	–	2	.875	25	–	6	.806
Wiscinsin–Green Bay †	13	–	3	.813	24	–	7	.774
Eastern Illinois	10	–	6	.625	17	–	12	.586
Cleveland State	8	–	8	.500	12	–	16	.429
Northern Iowa	8	–	8	.500	13	–	19	.406
Western Illinois	6	–	10	.375	13	–	15	.464
Akron	6	–	10	.375	15	–	13	.536
Illinois–Chicago	5	–	11	.313	15	–	15	.500
Valparaiso	2	–	14	.125	5	–	22	.185
† 1991 Mid-Con Tournament winner Rankings from AP Poll

The 1991 Mid-Continent Conference men's basketball tournament was held March 3–5, 1991 at the Brown County Veterans Memorial Arena in Ashwaubenon, Wisconsin.^{[2]} This was the seventh edition of the tournament for the AMCU-8/Mid-Con, now known as the Summit League.

== Bracket ==
Quarterfinals; March 3
1	Northern Illinois	77
8	Illinois–Chicago	52
4	Cleveland State	75
5	Northern Iowa	79
2	Wisconsin–Green Bay	85
7	Akron	61
3	Eastern Illinois	79
6	Western Illinois	75

Semifinals; March 4
1	Northern Illinois	76
5	Northern Iowa	63 ^{OT}
2	Wisconsin–Green Bay	63
3	Eastern Illinois	54

Final; March 5
1	Northern Illinois	39
2	Wisconsin–Green Bay	56
