= 1993–94 Green Bay Phoenix men's basketball team =

American college basketball season

1993–94 Green Bay Phoenix men's basketball

Mid-Continent Conference Champions

NCAA tournament, second round
- Conference: Mid-Continent Conference
- Record: 27–7 (15–3 Mid-Cont)
- Head coach: Dick Bennett (9th season)
- Assistant coach: Mike Heideman (8th season)
- Home arena: Brown County Veterans Memorial Arena

1993–94 Mid-Continent Conference men's basketball standings
| | Conf. | | | | Overall |
| Team | W | | L | PCT | W | | L | PCT |
|---|---|---|---|---|---|---|---|---|
| Wisconsin–Green Bay † | 15 | – | 3 | .833 | 27 | – | 7 | .794 |
| Illinois–Chicago | 14 | – | 4 | .778 | 20 | – | 9 | .690 |
| Valparaiso | 14 | – | 4 | .778 | 20 | – | 8 | .714 |
| Cleveland State | 9 | – | 9 | .500 | 14 | – | 15 | .483 |
| Wright State | 9 | – | 9 | .500 | 12 | – | 18 | .400 |
| Eastern Illinois | 7 | – | 11 | .389 | 12 | – | 15 | .444 |
| Northern Illinois | 7 | – | 11 | .389 | 10 | – | 17 | .370 |
| Wisconsin–Milwaukee | 7 | – | 11 | .389 | 10 | – | 17 | .370 |
| Western Illinois | 5 | – | 13 | .278 | 7 | – | 20 | .259 |
| Youngstown State | 3 | – | 15 | .167 | 5 | – | 21 | .192 |
† 1994 Mid-Con Tournament winner Rankings from AP Poll

The 1993–94 Green Bay Phoenix men's basketball team represented the University of Wisconsin–Green Bay in the 1993–94 NCAA Division I men's basketball season. Their head coach was Dick Bennett. They were the champions of the Mid-Continent Basketball tournament and earned the conference's automatic bid in the 1994 NCAA Tournament, the school's second ever appearance in the tournament. As a 12 seed, the Phoenix defeated the 5 seed University of California in the first round, 61–57. Green Bay lost to Syracuse in the second round.

== Roster ==
1993–94 Green Bay Phoenix men's basketball team
| Players | Coaches |
|---|---|
| Pos. / # / Name / Height / Weight / Year / Previous school / Hometown; F / 33 / Jeff Nordgaard / 6 ft 7 in (2.01 m) / 255 lb (116 kg) / So / Dawson-Boyd / Dawson, Minnesota | Head coach: Dick Bennett; Assistant coach(es) Legend: (C) Team captain; (S) Suspended; (I) Ineligible; (W) Walk-on; Injured; Current redshirt; Roster |

== Schedule ==
| Date time, TV | Rank^{#} | Opponent^{#} | Result | Record | High points | High rebounds | High assists | Site (attendance) city, state |
Regular season
| November 24*; 11:30 pm | | vs. No. 21 Purdue; Great Alaska Shootout | L 69–74 | 0–1 | 20 – Ludvigson | 9 – Nordgaard | 5 – Nordgaard | Sullivan Arena (5,154); Anchorage, Alaska |
| November 26*; 4:00 pm | | vs. N. C. State; Great Alaska Shootout | W 76–45 | 1–1 | 15 – Ludvigson | 8 – Berlowski | 4 – Tied | Sullivan Arena (4,343); Anchorage, Alaska |
| November 27*; 6:00 pm | | vs. Wake Forest; Great Alaska Shootout | L 58–61 ^{OT} | 1–2 | 20 – Vander Valden | 7 – Tied | 6 – Grzesk | Sullivan Arena (4,312); Anchorage, Alaska |
| December 3*; 5:30 pm | | vs. Detroit; First Bank Classic | W 74–63 | 2–2 | 22 – Vander Velden | 6 – Ludvigson | 5 – Westlake | Bradley Center (15,772); Milwaukee, WI |
| December 4*; 9:00 pm | | at Marquette; First Bank Classic | W 46–45 | 3–2 | 18 – Vander Velden | 7 – Nordgaard | 5 – Rice | Bradley Center (13,840); Milwaukee, WI |
| December 8*; 7:05 pm, WGBA-TV | | at Wisconsin | L 50–64 | 3–3 | 18 – Vander Velden | 11 – Nordgaard | 2 – Tied | Wisconsin Field House (11,500); Madison, WI |
| December 11*; 12:30 pm | | at Bowling Green State | W 52–49 | 4–3 | 14 – Berlowski | 5 – Nordgaard | 8 – Grzesk | Anderson Arena (1,794); Bowling Green, Ohio |
| December 18*; 7:35 pm | | Oregon | W 66–46 | 5–3 | 17 – Ludvigson | 8 – Tied | 5 – Nordgaard | Brown County Veterans Memorial Arena (4,154); Green Bay, WI |
| December 27*; 7:35 pm | | Chicago State | W 97–53 | 6–3 | 16 – Ludvigson | 7 – Nordgaard | 7 – Berlowski | Brown County Veterans Memorial Arena (4,538); Green Bay, WI |
| December 30*; 8:15 pm | | vs. Eastern Washington; Great Northern Classic | W 58–44 | 7–3 | 11 – Vander Velden | 6 – Ludvigson | 4 – Tied | Brown County Veterans Memorial Arena (5,504); Green Bay, WI |
| December 31*; 8:15 pm | | East Carolina; Great Northern Classic | W 60–43 | 8–3 | 14 – Nordgaard | 9 – Nordgaard | 4 – Vander Velden | Brown County Veterans Memorial Arena (5,104); Green Bay, WI |
| January 8; 7:35 pm | | Western Illinois | W 60–48 | 9–3 (1–0) | 25 – Nordgaard | 9 – Vander Velden | 6 – Martinez | Brown County Veterans Memorial Arena (4,846); Green Bay, WI |
| January 10; 7:35 pm, NewSport | | Northern Illinois | W 59–46 | 10–3 (2–0) | 18 – Tied | 6 – Tied | 4 – Martinez | Brown County Veterans Memorial Arena (5,004); Green Bay, WI |
| January 15; 6:30 pm | | at Youngstown State | W 69–67 | 11–3 (3–0) | 21 – Nordgaard | 8 – Berlowski | 8 – Martinez | Beeghly Center (2,116); Youngstown, Ohio |
| January 17; 6:30 pm | | at Cleveland State | W 78–56 | 12–3 (4–0) | 14 – Nordgaard | 12 – Nordgaard | 6 – Martinez | Henry J. Goodman Arena (2,377); Cleveland, Ohio |
| January 22; 3:00 pm | | at Wright State | L 51–53 | 13–4 (4–1) | 18 – Nordgaard | 7 – LeDuc | 3 – Tied | Ervin J. Nutter Center (6,039); Fairborn, Ohio |
| January 24; 7:30 pm | | at Eastern Illinois | W 64–57 | 14–4 (5–1) | 18 – Martinez | 4 – Tied | 4 – Tied | Lantz Arena (4,102); Charleston, Illinois |
| January 26; 7:30 pm | | at Milwaukee | W 64–42 | 15–4 (6–1) | 17 – Nordgaard | 13 – Nordgaard | 4 – Grzesk | MECCA Arena (4,552); Milwaukee, WI |
| January 29; 7:35 pm | | Valparaiso | W 63–50 | 16–4 (7–1) | 21 – Nordgaard | 7 – Nordgaard | 3 – Grzesk | Brown County Veterans Memorial Arena (5,994); Green Bay, WI |
| January 31; 7:35 pm | | Illinois-Chicago | W 71–60 | 17–4 (8–1) | 25 – Nordgaard | 10 – Nordgaard | 5 – Tied | Brown County Veterans Memorial Arena (5,454); Green Bay, WI |
| February 5; 7:35 pm | | Youngstown State | W 69–58 | 18–4 (9–1) | 17 – Nordgaard | 5 – Ludvigson | 7 – Grzesk | Brown County Veterans Memorial Arena (5,645); Green Bay, WI |
| February 7; 7:35 pm | | Cleveland State | W 83–62 | 19–4 (10–1) | 27 – Nordgaard | 10 – Nordgaard | 6 – Westlake | Brown County Veterans Memorial Arena (5,675); Green Bay, WI |
| February 12; 7:30 pm | | at Western Illinois | W 66–48 | 20–4 (11–1) | 21 – Ludvigson | 10 – Ludvigson | 7 – Martinez | Western Hall (1,961); Macomb, Illinois |
| February 14; 6:05 pm, WGBA-TV | | at Northern Illinois | W 73–70 | 21–4 (12–1) | 21 – Nordgaard | 9 – Nordgaard | 5 – Martinez | Chick Evans Field House (2,016); DeKalb, Illinois |
| February 19; 1:30 pm | | at Valparaiso | L 56–63 | 21–5 (12–2) | 17 – Vander Velden | 6 – Tied | 3 – Tied | Athletics-Recreation Center (4,322); Valparaiso, Indiana |
| February 21; 7:00 pm | | at Illinois-Chicago | W 80–66 | 22–5 (13–2) | 21 – Nordgaard | 6 – Vander Velden | 6 – Grzesk | UIC Pavilion (4,450); Chicago, Illinois |
| February 24; 7:35 pm | | Milwaukee | L 55–58 | 22–6 (13–3) | 17 – Nordgaard | 9 – Nordgaard | 3 – Vander Velden | Brown County Veterans Memorial Arena (5,416); Green Bay, WI |
| February 26; 7:35 pm | | Wright State | W 80–46 | 23–6 (14–3) | 17 – Berlowski | 6 – Tied | 6 – Tied | Brown County Veterans Memorial Arena (5,596); Green Bay, WI |
| February 28; 7:35 pm | | Eastern Illinois | W 58–45 | 24–6 (15–3) | 19 – Nordgaard | 6 – LeDuc | 5 – Martinez | Brown County Veterans Memorial Arena (5,542); Green Bay, WI |
Mid-Continent Conference tournament
| March 6; 1:00 pm, NewSport | (1) | vs. (8) Western Illinois; Quarterfinals | W 79–39 | 25–6 | 17 – Vander Velden | 8 – Grzesk | 5 – Jackson | Rosemont Horizon; Rosemont, Illinois |
| March 7; 6:30 pm, NewSport | (1) | vs. (4) Cleveland State; Semifinals | W 93–63 | 26–6 | 23 – Nordgaard | 7 – Tied | 5 – Grzesk | Rosemont Horizon; Rosemont, Illinois |
| March 8; 6:30 pm, ESPN | (1) | vs. (2) Illinois-Chicago; Championship | W 61–56 | 27–6 | 32 – Nordgaard | 7 – LeDuc | 3 – Tied | Rosemont Horizon (8,322); Rosemont, Illinois |
NCAA tournament
| March 17; 4:15 pm, CBS | (12 W) | vs. (5 W) No. 16 California; First round | W 61–57 | 28–6 (18–3) | 24 – Nordgaard | 9 – Nordgaard | 7 – Martinez | Dee Events Center (12,126); Ogden, Utah |
| March 19; 3:35 pm, CBS | (12 W) | vs. (4 W) No. 15 Syracuse; Second round | L 59–64 | 29–6 (18–3) | 19 – Nordgaard | 7 – Ludvigson | 4 – Martinez | Dee Events Center (12,126); Ogden, Utah |
*Non-conference game. ^{#}Rankings from AP Poll. (#) Tournament seedings in parentheses.
