= Dick Bennett =

American basketball player and coach

Biographical details
- Born: April 20, 1943 (age 83); Pittsburgh, Pennsylvania, U.S.

Playing career
- 1962–1965: Ripon
- Position: Guard

Coaching career (HC unless noted)
- 1965–1966: West Bend HS (freshmen)
- 1966–1968: Mineral Point HS
- 1968–1969: Marion HS
- 1969–1972: New London HS
- 1972–1976: Eau Claire Memorial HS
- 1976–1985: Wisconsin-Stevens Point
- 1985–1995: Green Bay
- 1995–2001: Wisconsin
- 2003–2006: Washington State

Head coaching record
- Overall: 489–307 (college)
- Tournaments: 5–7 (NCAA Division I); 2–3 (NIT); 6–3 (NAIA)

Accomplishments and honors

Championships
- NCAA Division I tournament Final Four (2000); 4 WSUC regular season (1982–1985); 2 Mid-Con tournament (1991, 1994); 2 Mid-Con regular season (1992, 1994); MCC tournament (1995)

Awards
- Coach Wooden "Keys to Life" Award (2013); NAIA Coach of the Year (1984); 2× WSUC Coach of the Year (1982, 1985); 2× Mid-Con Coach of the Year (1990, 1992)

Richard A. Bennett (born April 20, 1943) is an American former college basketball coach who is best known for building the Wisconsin-Green Bay Phoenix men's basketball program into a mid-major power and revitalizing the Wisconsin Badgers basketball program. Born in Pittsburgh, Pennsylvania, he is the father of former Virginia Cavaliers head coach Tony Bennett and former Northern Illinois women's basketball head coach Kathi Bennett.

== Early life ==
Bennett was born in Pittsburgh, Pennsylvania and raised in Clintonville, Wisconsin. He graduated from Ripon College in 1965 with a B.A. in education. At Ripon, Bennett played basketball (guard), football (halfback and return specialist), and baseball (third baseman) four years each.

== Coaching career ==
Bennett had enormous success at each level of collegiate coaching in Wisconsin. In the mid-1970s, he led Eau Claire Memorial High School to the state title game. In the mid-1980s, he led the University of Wisconsin-Stevens Point to an NAIA title game. In the early 1990s he brought the Green Bay Phoenix of UW–Green Bay to its first three NCAA tournament appearances. And in 2000, after five years in Madison, he took the Badgers to the Final Four.

=== High school ===
Prior to collegiate coaching, Bennett coached at the high school level. In 1965, he became freshman basketball coach at West Bend High School in West Bend, Wisconsin. He coached at Mineral Point High in Mineral Point, Wisconsin, during the 1966–67 season. He then was varsity head coach at Marion High School in Marion, Wisconsin for two seasons from (1967–1969), New London High School in New London, Wisconsin (1969–1972), and Memorial High School in Eau Claire, Wisconsin (1972–1976). Bennett led Memorial to a runner-up finish to South Milwaukee at the WIAA State Tournament during the 1975–76 season.

=== Wisconsin–Stevens Point ===
Bennett began his collegiate coaching career at the University of Wisconsin–Stevens Point in 1976, where he won 173 games in nine seasons. While head coach, Bennett completed a master's degree in education with an emphasis in professional development in August 1979. He was named NAIA Coach of the Year after leading the 1983–84 squad to a 28–4 record and national runner-up finish. That team featured future NBA All-Star Terry Porter and future Saint Louis University head coach Brad Soderberg. In 2009, the University of Wisconsin–Stevens Point renamed its basketball court Bennett Court to honor both Dick Bennett and his brother Jack Bennett.

=== Green Bay ===
In 1985, Bennett moved to the University of Wisconsin–Green Bay. The Green Bay Phoenix posted a 4–24 record the year before Bennett arrived, but had reached the second round of the NIT tournament by 1990.

Bennett's son Tony became the star of the team during the early 1990s. A guard who played several seasons in the NBA, Tony Bennett led the team to its first NCAA tournament berth in 1991, where the Phoenix lost to Michigan State in the first round. The following year, the UWGB rolled to a 25–5 record and won its first regular season conference title, but lost in the conference tournament. After Tony Bennett's departure in 1992, the 1993–94 team won the conference title and tournament on its way to the NCAA tournament. There, the 12th-seeded Phoenix defeated 5th-seeded California, whose roster included Jason Kidd and Lamond Murray. In Bennett's final year with the Phoenix, his team returned to the NCAA Tournament where they lost to Big Ten champion Purdue.

=== Wisconsin ===
In 1995, Bennett replaced Stan Van Gundy at the University of Wisconsin–Madison as the head coach of the men's basketball team. In Bennett's first year, the Wisconsin Badgers earned a bid in the NIT. A year later, the Badgers notched their first winning record in Big Ten Conference play since 1974, and only their second since 1954. He coached Wisconsin to three NCAA tournament appearances, including the 2000 Final Four. The Badgers had played in a total of three NCAA tournaments in their entire history prior to his arrival. Bennett also coached Wisconsin to its first ever 20-win season in 1998–99. Bennett resigned three games into the 2000–01 season citing burnout. During his tenure at Wisconsin he was 94–68 (.580) from 1995–2000.

=== Washington State Cougars ===
After two years off, Bennett was hired at Washington State University on March 29, 2003. He faced a daunting rebuilding project. Making strong defense a cornerstone, he started building around veterans Thomas Kelati and Jeff Varem and brought in what arguably was the greatest recruiting class in school history in 2004 (Kyle Weaver, Derrick Low, Robbie Cowgill, Chris Henry, Daven Harmeling and Josh Akognon). Bennett stayed three seasons at WSU. The team did not post a winning record, but they did secure wins over teams they traditionally could never beat: UCLA, Arizona and Stanford. Bennett retired following the 2005–06 season and handed the program to his son and associate coach Tony Bennett. Tony proceeded to guide the Cougars to back-to-back NCAA Tournament appearances and a Sweet-16 showing in 2007–08.

=== Coaching awards ===
1982 Wisconsin State University Conference Coach of the Year
1985 Wisconsin State University Conference Coach of the Year
1985 NAIA District IV Coach of the Year
1985 NAIA Area IV Coach of the Year
1990 Mid-Continent Conference Coach of the Year
1992 Mid-Continent Conference Coach of the Year
1992 NABC District 11 Coach of the Year
1994 Basketball Times Midwest Coach of the Year
1994 NABC District 11 Coach of the Year
2007 Wisconsin Athletic Hall of Fame

== Legacy ==
Bennett recruited players who were willing to place teamwork and discipline ahead of personal statistics. His players excelled in the classroom as well as on the court. While few NBA players emerged from his programs, most of his players have gone on to success in other careers, including coaching. He was elected to the Wisconsin Athletic Hall of Fame in 2007.

Bennett is best known for devising the "pack line" defense, a gap defense that clogs up potential driving lanes and prevents ballhandlers from getting to the paint. His son continued using the "pack line" after succeeding him at Washington State, and took the defense with him to Virginia. His influence on defense brought him fame in the 2014 NCAA Tournament, when four teams in the Sweet 16 (Arizona, Dayton, Virginia and Wisconsin) used the "pack line."

== Background and family ==
Bennett went to high school in Clintonville, Wisconsin and graduated from Ripon College. His son, Tony Bennett, was hired as Washington State's head men's basketball coach after his father's retirement. Three years later, Tony accepted the position as head men's basketball coach at the University of Virginia. Bennett's daughter, Kathi Bennett, has served as the head women's basketball coach the University of Evansville, Indiana University Bloomington, and Northern Illinois University. His brother Jack Bennett, retired as head men's basketball coach at the University of Wisconsin–Stevens Point after winning back-to-back NCAA Division III national titles, in 2004 and 2005. Another brother, Tom Bennett, died of AIDS-related complications at age 38 in January 1996.

== Head coaching record ==
=== College ===
Record table
Season	Team	Overall	Conference	Standing	Postseason
Wisconsin–Stevens Point Pointers (Wisconsin State University Athletic Conference) (1976–1985)
1976–77	Wisconsin–Stevens Point	9–17	4–12	9th	
1977–78	Wisconsin–Stevens Point	12–14	8–8	T–5th	
1978–79	Wisconsin–Stevens Point	14–12	9–7	T–3rd	
1979–80	Wisconsin–Stevens Point	18–10	13–3	2nd	
1980–81	Wisconsin–Stevens Point	19–8	11–5	3rd	
1981–82	Wisconsin–Stevens Point	22–6	13–3	T–1st	
1982–83	Wisconsin–Stevens Point	26–4	15–1	1st	NAIA Second Round
1983–84	Wisconsin–Stevens Point	28–4	14–2	T–1st	NAIA Runner-up
1984–85	Wisconsin–Stevens Point	25–5	14–2	1st	NAIA Second Round
Wisconsin–Stevens Point:		173–80	101–43		
Green Bay Phoenix (Mid-Continent Conference) (1985–1994)
1985–86	Green Bay	5–23	3–11	T–7th	
1986–87	Green Bay	15–14	8–6	4th	
1987–88	Green Bay	18–9	9–5	3rd	
1988–89	Green Bay	14–14	6–6	4th	
1989–90	Green Bay	24–8	9–3	2nd	NIT Second Round
1990–91	Green Bay	24–7	13–3	2nd	NCAA Division I First Round
1991–92	Green Bay	25–5	14–2	1st	NIT First Round
1992–93	Green Bay	13–14	9–7	T–4th	
1993–94	Green Bay	27–7	15–3	1st	NCAA Division I Second Round
Green Bay Phoenix (Midwestern Collegiate Conference) (1994–1995)
1994–95	Green Bay	22–8	11–4	T–2nd	NCAA Division I First Round
Green Bay:		187–109	97–50		
Wisconsin Badgers (Big Ten Conference) (1995–2001)
1995–96	Wisconsin	17–15	7–9	8th	NIT Second Round
1996–97	Wisconsin	18–10	10–6	T–4th	NCAA Division I First Round
1997–98	Wisconsin	12–19	3–13	T–9th	
1998–99	Wisconsin	22–10	9–7	T–3rd	NCAA Division I First Round
1999–00	Wisconsin	22–14	8–8	6th	NCAA Division I Final Four
2000–01	Wisconsin	2–1			
Wisconsin:		93–69	37–43		
Washington State Cougars (Pacific-10 Conference) (2003–2006)
2003–04	Washington State	13–16	7–11	T–7th	
2004–05	Washington State	12–16	7–11	T–6th	
2005–06	Washington State	11–17	4–14	10th	
Washington State:		36–49	18–36		
Total:		489–307			
National champion Postseason invitational champion Conference regular season champion Conference regular season and conference tournament champion Division regular season champion Division regular season and conference tournament champion Conference tournament champion

== See also ==
- List of NCAA Division I men's basketball tournament Final Four appearances by coach
