= Kathi Bennett =

American basketball player and coach

Current position
- Title: Assistant coach
- Team: Edgewood
- Conference: NACC

Biographical details
- Born: Clintonville, Wisconsin, U.S.
- Education: Green Bay

Coaching career (HC unless noted)
- 1988–1989: Marycrest
- 1989–1996: Wisconsin–Oshkosh
- 1996–2000: Evansville
- 2000–2005: Indiana
- 2008–2010: Wisconsin (assistant)
- 2010–2015: Northern Illinois
- 2018–present: Edgewood (assistant)

Head coaching record
- Overall: 353–270 (.567)

Kathi Bennett (born January 31, 1963) is an American women's basketball coach. She is the former head coach of the Northern Illinois Huskies women's basketball team, a position she held from 2010 to 2015.

Kathi Bennett
Medal record

Women's basketball

Assistant Coach for United States

Pan American Games
Silver medal – second place	2003 Santo Domingo	Team competition

== Biography ==
Bennett is the daughter of former Green Bay Phoenix, Wisconsin Badgers and Washington State Cougars head coach Dick Bennett. Her brother is former NBA player and former Virginia Cavaliers head coach Tony Bennett. She graduated from Stevens Point Area Senior High School in Stevens Point, Wisconsin and attended the University of Wisconsin–Stevens Point and the University of Wisconsin–Green Bay, where she played on the women's basketball teams at both schools.

== Coaching career ==
Bennett served as a head coach at Marycrest College during the 1988–89 season before taking the same position at the University of Wisconsin–Oshkosh. During her time there she led the team to the 1996 National Championship and was named Coach of the Year that season. From there she was the head coach with the Evansville Purple Aces and the Indiana Hoosiers. After spending a period of time away from coaching, she became an assistant coach with the Wisconsin Badgers before being hired to the head coaching position with the NIU Huskies.
