= 1995 Midwestern Collegiate Conference men's basketball tournament =

- Classification: Division I
- Season: 1994–95
- Teams: 10
- Site: Nutter Center; Dayton, OH
- Champions: WI-Green Bay
- Winning coach: Dick Bennett
- MVP: Jeff Nordgaard (Wisconsin-Green Bay)

1994–95 Midwestern Collegiate Conference men's basketball standings
	Conf.				Overall
Team	W		L	PCT	W		L	PCT
Xavier	14	–	0	1.000	23	–	5	.821
Illinois-Chicago	11	–	4	.733	18	–	9	.667
WI-Green Bay †	11	–	4	.733	22	–	8	.733
Detroit Mercy	9	–	5	.643	13	–	15	.464
La Salle	7	–	7	.500	13	–	14	.481
Northern Illinois	7	–	8	.467	19	–	10	.655
Wright State	6	–	8	.429	13	–	17	.433
Cleveland State	3	–	11	.214	10	–	17	.370
UW-Milwaukee	2	–	13	.133	3	–	24	.111
Loyola (IL)	2	–	13	.133	5	–	22	.185
† 1995 MCC tournament winner Rankings from AP Poll

The 1995 Midwestern Collegiate Conference men's basketball tournament took place at the end of the 1994–95 regular season. The tournament was hosted by Wright State.

== Seeds ==
All Midwestern Collegiate Conference schools played in the tournament. Teams were seeded by 1994–95 Midwestern Collegiate Conference season record, with a tiebreaker system to seed teams with identical conference records.

== Bracket ==
First round
9	Cleveland State	81
8	Wright State	88
7	Northern Illinois	62
10	Loyola (IL)	57

Second round
1	Xavier	70
8	Wright State	71
4	Detroit	59
5	Butler	53
2	Illinois-Chicago	83
7	Northern Illinois	87
3	WI-Green Bay	54
6	La Salle	46

Semifinals
8	Wright State	76
4	Detroit	69
7	Northern Illinois	55
3	WI-Green Bay	68

Championship
8	Wright State	59
3	WI-Green Bay	73
