= 1994 Mid-Continent Conference men's basketball tournament =

College basketball tournament

- Classification: Division I
- Season: 1993–94
- Teams: 8
- Site: Rosemont Horizon; Rosemont, Illinois
- Champions: Wisconsin–Green Bay (2nd title)
- Winning coach: Dick Bennett (2nd title)
- MVP: Sherell Ford (Illinois–Chicago)
- Mid-Continent Conference men's basketball tournaments

1993–94 Mid-Continent Conference men's basketball standings
	Conf.				Overall
Team	W		L	PCT	W		L	PCT
Wisconsin–Green Bay †	15	–	3	.833	27	–	7	.794
Illinois–Chicago	14	–	4	.778	20	–	9	.690
Valparaiso	14	–	4	.778	20	–	8	.714
Cleveland State	9	–	9	.500	14	–	15	.483
Wright State	9	–	9	.500	12	–	18	.400
Eastern Illinois	7	–	11	.389	12	–	15	.444
Northern Illinois	7	–	11	.389	10	–	17	.370
Wisconsin–Milwaukee	7	–	11	.389	10	–	17	.370
Western Illinois	5	–	13	.278	7	–	20	.259
Youngstown State	3	–	15	.167	5	–	21	.192
† 1994 Mid-Con Tournament winner Rankings from AP Poll

The 1994 Mid-Continent Conference men's basketball tournament was held March 6–8, 1994 at the Rosemont Horizon in Rosemont, Illinois. This was the eleventh edition of the tournament for the Association of Mid-Continent Universities, now known as the Summit League. The winner of this tournament would go on receive a berth to the 1994 NCAA Division I men's basketball tournament, often referred to as NCAA March Madness, later that month.

== Bracket ==
Quarterfinals; March 6
1	Wisconsin–Green Bay	79
8	Western Illinois	39
4	Cleveland State	70
5	Wright State	67
2	Illinois–Chicago	87
7	Northern Illinois	77
3	Valparaiso	74
6	Eastern Illinois	72

Semifinals; March 7
1	Wisconsin–Green Bay	93
4	Cleveland State	63
2	Illinois–Chicago	87
3	Valparaiso	77

Final; March 8
1	Wisconsin–Green Bay	61
2	Illinois–Chicago	56

== Broadcast information ==
=== Local radio ===
Seed	Teams	Flagship station	Play-by-play announcer	Color analyst(s)
1	Wisconsin–Green Bay	WDUZ–AM 1400 (Green Bay)		
