= 1990–91 Green Bay Phoenix men's basketball team =

American college basketball season

1990–91 Green Bay Phoenix men's basketball

Mid-Continent Conference Champions

NCAA tournament
- Conference: Mid-Continent Conference
- Record: 24–7 (13–3 Mid-Cont)
- Head coach: Dick Bennett (6th season)
- Assistant coach: Mike Heideman (5th season)
- Home arena: Brown County Veterans Memorial Arena

1990–91 Mid-Continent Conference men's basketball standings
	Conf.				Overall
Team	W		L	PCT	W		L	PCT
Northern Illinois	14	–	2	.875	25	–	6	.806
Wisconsin–Green Bay †	13	–	3	.813	24	–	7	.774
Eastern Illinois	10	–	6	.625	17	–	12	.586
Cleveland State	8	–	8	.500	12	–	16	.429
Northern Iowa	8	–	8	.500	13	–	19	.406
Western Illinois	6	–	10	.375	13	–	15	.464
Akron	6	–	10	.375	15	–	13	.536
Illinois–Chicago	5	–	11	.313	15	–	15	.500
Valparaiso	2	–	14	.125	5	–	22	.185
† 1991 Mid-Con Tournament winner Rankings from AP Poll

The 1990–91 Green Bay Phoenix men's basketball team represented the University of Wisconsin–Green Bay during the 1990–91 NCAA Division I men's basketball season. Their head coach was Dick Bennett. They were the champions of the Mid-Continent Basketball tournament to earn the conference's automatic bid in the 1991 NCAA tournament, the school's second ever appearance in the tournament. As the 12 seed in the West region, the Phoenix fell to Michigan State in the opening round, 60–58.

== Roster ==
1990–91 Green Bay Phoenix men's basketball team
Players	Coaches
Pos. / # / Name / Height / Weight / Year / Hometown; G / 25 / Tony Bennett / 5 ft 11 in (1.8 m) / — / Jr	Head coach: Dick Bennett; Assistant coach(es) Legend: (C) Team captain; (S) Suspended; (I) Ineligible; (W) Walk-on; Injured; Current redshirt; Roster

== Schedule and results ==
Date time, TV	Rank^{#}	Opponent^{#}	Result	Record	Site city, state
Regular season
Nov 24, 1990*		at Austin Peay	W 67–61	1–0	Dunn Center (2,873); Clarksville, Tennessee
Nov 27, 1990*		San Francisco State	W 91–59	2–0	Brown County Arena (4,076); Ashwaubenon, Wisconsin
Dec 1, 1990*		Boise State	W 67–59	3–0	Brown County Arena (5,174); Ashwaubenon, Wisconsin
Dec 4, 1990*		at Colorado	W 83–78	4–0	Coors Events/Conference Center (4,113); Boulder, Colorado
Dec 8, 1990*		at Clemson	L 68–75	4–1	Littlejohn Coliseum (5,000); Clemson, South Carolina
Dec 1, 1990*		SIU Edwardsville	W 69–52	5–1	Brown County Arena (5,207); Ashwaubenon, Wisconsin
Dec 22, 1990*		at DePaul; Old Style Classic	W 57–56	6–1	Rosemont Horizon (9,000); Rosemont, Illinois
Dec 23, 1990*		vs. Southern Illinois; Old Style Classic	L 64–70	6–2	Rosemont Horizon (9,269); Rosemont, Illinois
Dec 29, 1990*		Central Michigan	W 67–59 ^{OT}	7–2	Brown County Arena (5,347); Ashwaubenon, Wisconsin
Jan 2, 1991*		No. 19 Nebraska	L 63–70	7–3	Brown County Arena (5,937); Ashwaubenon, Wisconsin
Jan 5, 1991		at Western Illinois	W 70–63	8–3 (1–0)	Western Hall (1,921); Macomb, Illinois
Jan 7, 1991		at Northern Iowa	W 59–58	9–3 (2–0)	UNI-Dome (4,266); Cedar Falls, Iowa
Jan 12, 1991		Eastern Illinois	W 72–62	10–3 (3–0)	Brown County Arena (5,733); Ashwaubenon, Wisconsin
Jan 14, 1991		Valparaiso	L 55–58	10–4 (3–1)	Brown County Arena (4,857); Ashwaubenon, Wisconsin
Jan 19, 1991		at Northern Illinois	W 63–57	11–4 (4–1)	Chick Evans Field House (6,060); DeKalb, Illinois
Jan 21, 1991*		at Chicago State	W 87–83	12–4	Dickens Athletic Center (200); Chicago, Illinois
Jan 26, 1991		at Cleveland State	W 72–64	13–5 (5–2)	Woodling Gym (2,899); Cleveland, Ohio
Jan 29, 1991		at Akron	L 48–50	12–5 (4–2)	Brown County Arena (4,817); Ashwaubenon, Wisconsin
Feb 2, 1991		Western Illinois	W 77–50	14–5 (6–2)	Brown County Arena (5,710); Ashwaubenon, Wisconsin
Feb 4, 1991*		Northern Iowa	W 72–67	15–5 (7–2)	Brown County Arena (4,977); Ashwaubenon, Wisconsin
Feb 9, 1991		at Eastern Illinois	L 56–63	15–6 (7–3)	Lantz Arena (4,233); Charleston, Illinois
Feb 12, 1991		UIC	W 63–53	16–6 (8–3)	Brown County Arena (4,847); Ashwaubenon, Wisconsin
Feb 16, 1991		Northern Illinois	W 61–53	17–6 (9–3)	Brown County Arena (6,279); Ashwaubenon, Wisconsin
Feb 20, 1991		at UIC	W 89–81 ^{OT}	18–6 (10–3)	UIC Pavilion (1,104); Chicago, Illinois
Feb 23, 1991		Akron	W 61–52	19–6 (11–3)	James A. Rhodes Arena (2,135); Akron, Ohio
Feb 25, 1991		Cleveland State	W 73–62	20–6 (12–3)	Brown County Arena (5,847); Ashwaubenon, Wisconsin
Feb 28, 1991		at Valparaiso	W 69–64	21–6 (13–3)	Athletics-Recreation Center (1,865); Valparaiso, Indiana
Mid-Continent Conference tournament
Mar 3, 1991*	(2)	(7) Akron; Quarterfinal	W 85–61	22–6	Brown County Arena (6,117); Ashwaubenon, Wisconsin
Mar 4, 1991*	(2)	(3) Eastern Illinois; Semifinal	W 63–54	23–6	Brown County Arena (6,187); Ashwaubenon, Wisconsin
Mar 5, 1991*	(2)	(1) Northern Illinois; Championship Game	W 56–39	24–6	Brown County Arena (6,197); Ashwaubenon, Wisconsin
NCAA tournament
Mar 15, 1991*	(12 W)	vs. (5 W) Michigan State; First Round	L 58–60	24–7	McKale Center (13,367); Tucson, Arizona
*Non-conference game. ^{#}Rankings from AP Poll. (#) Tournament seedings in parentheses. W=West.

== Awards and honors ==
- Tony Bennett – Mid-Con Player of the Year
