= Tony Bennett (basketball) =

American basketball coach, player, and draft advisor (born 1969)

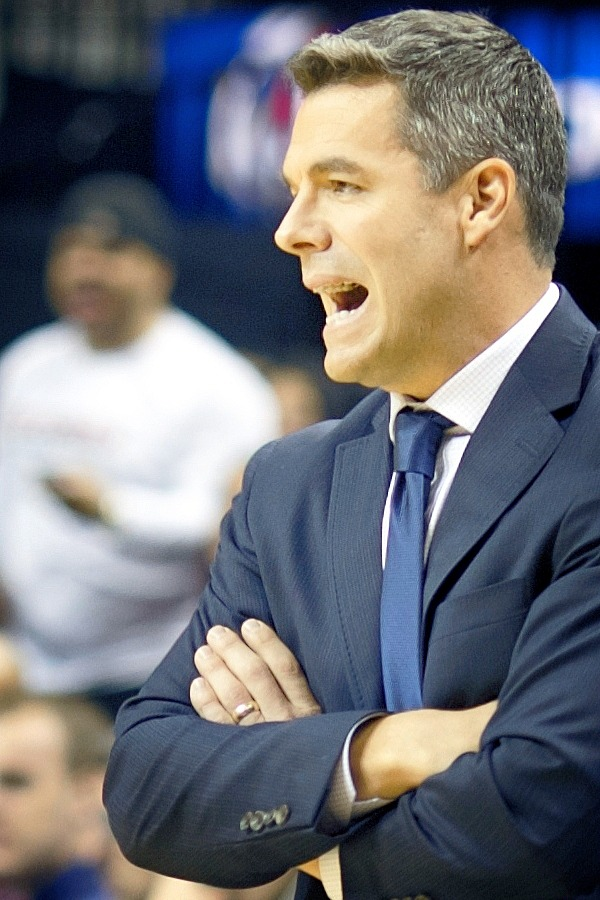
- Bennett at the Barclays Center in 2014–15

Los Angeles Lakers
- Title: Draft advisor
- League: NBA

Personal information
- Born: June 1, 1969 (age 57) Clintonville, Wisconsin, U.S.
- Listed height: 6 ft 0 in (1.83 m)
- Listed weight: 175 lb (79 kg)

Career information
- High school: Preble (Green Bay, Wisconsin)
- College: Green Bay (1988–1992)
- NBA draft: 1992: 2nd round, 35th overall pick
- Drafted by: Charlotte Hornets
- Playing career: 1992–1997
- Position: Point guard
- Number: 25
- Coaching career: 1998–2024

Career history

Playing
- 1992–1995: Charlotte Hornets
- 1996–1997: North Harbour Vikings

Coaching
- 1998–1999: North Harbour Kings
- 1999–2003: Wisconsin (assistant)
- 2003–2004: Washington State (assistant)
- 2004–2006: Washington State (associate HC)
- 2006–2009: Washington State
- 2009–2024: Virginia

Career highlights
- As player: Frances Pomeroy Naismith Award (1992); 2× MCC Player of the Year (1991, 1992); 3× First-team All-MCC (1990–1992); Second-team All-MCC (1989); MCC Newcomer of the Year (1989); Academic All-American of the Year (1991); 2× Academic All-American (1991, 1992); MCC tournament MVP (1991); No. 25 retired by Green Bay Phoenix; Wisconsin Mr. Basketball (1988); As head coach: NCAA Division I tournament champion (2019); NCAA Division I tournament Final Four (2019); 2× ACC tournament champion (2014, 2018); 6× ACC regular season (2014, 2015, 2018, 2019, 2021, 2023); 3× Henry Iba Award (2007, 2015, 2018); 2× Naismith College Coach of the Year (2007, 2018); 2× AP National Coach of the Year (2007, 2018); NABC Coach of the Year (2018); Gene Bartow Award (2025); Jim Phelan Award (2007); Sporting News Coach of the Year (2007); 4× ACC Coach of the Year (2014, 2015, 2018, 2019); Pac-10 Coach of the Year (2007)

Career playing statistics
- Points: 538 (3.5 ppg)
- Rebounds: 135 (1.0 rpg)
- Assists: 303 (2.0 apg)
- Stats at NBA.com
- Stats at Basketball Reference

Career coaching record
- NCAA: 433–169 (.719)
Medals
Men's basketball
Representing the United States
Pan American Games
Bronze medal – third place	1991 Havana	National team
FIBA Under-19 World Championship
Gold medal – first place	2013 Prague	National team

Anthony Guy Bennett (born June 1, 1969) is an American NBA draft advisor, former professional basketball player and college basketball coach. From 2009 to 2024, he was the head coach of the University of Virginia men's team, with whom he won an NCAA championship in 2019. Bennett is a three-time recipient of the Henry Iba Award, two-time Naismith College Coach of the Year, and two-time AP Coach of the Year.

He is one of three coaches in history (with Dean Smith and Mike Krzyzewski) to lead his program to 10 or more consecutive winning ACC records (Note: Two former coaches fell just short of this mark. Vic Bubas had nine consecutive winning ACC seasons before retiring in 1969. Roy Williams had nine consecutive winning conference seasons before slumping to a last place 6–14 ACC record in 2019–20.)—retiring with a streak of 13—and is one of three coaches (also with Smith and Krzyzewski) to be named ACC Coach of the Year four or more times. He coached 500 games at Virginia, winning 364 (72.8%) of them, edging out Pop Lannigan (72.7%) to hold Virginia's highest winning percentage in school history; he also holds that record at Washington State (winning 67.6%). He is the all-time wins leader at Virginia and holds or shares the single-season wins record at both UVA and WSU. He led the Virginia program to two of its three ACC Tournament championships and one of its three Final Four appearances.

As a 5'11" point guard, Bennett ranks first in NCAA history for career three-point field goal accuracy at 49.7%, shooting above 50% from range in both his junior and senior seasons. He started for the United States national team at the 1991 Pan American Games, was awarded the Frances Pomeroy Naismith Award as the nation's top player under six feet tall, and was named Academic All-American of the Year. Bennett starred for the Green Bay Phoenix under his father, Dick Bennett, who later took Wisconsin to the 2000 Final Four using an earlier version of the packline defense Bennett perfected at Virginia.

Bennett played three years in the NBA for the Charlotte Hornets and after an injury, several more professionally in Australia and New Zealand where he started coaching. He since coached several players at the college level who've gone on to be known for shooting prowess in the NBA, such as Malcolm Brogdon (eighth 50–40–90 shooter in NBA history), Joe Harris (led NBA in three-point accuracy in 2018–19 and in 2020–21) and Klay Thompson (one-half of the Splash Brothers). Both Harris and Thompson have won the Three-Point Contest at the NBA All-Star Game. His player Trey Murphy III recorded the only college 50–40–90 season from any ACC team.

Originally inheriting the worst Virginia team by record since 1967, Bennett led his Cavalier squads to four 30-win seasons, won the NCAA tournament championship with a 35–3 team in 2019, won ACC tournaments in 2014 and in 2018, and won or shared 6 ACC regular season titles. Known for coaching defensive intensity, Bennett was ranked the top defensive coach in college basketball by a CBS Sports poll of head coaches in 2015 and by ESPN Insider in 2018. The defensive style of basketball he taught at UVA was often compared to a boa constrictor choking out opponents, and his teams were also known for their unselfish play and tempo control.

== Biography and playing career ==
=== College ===
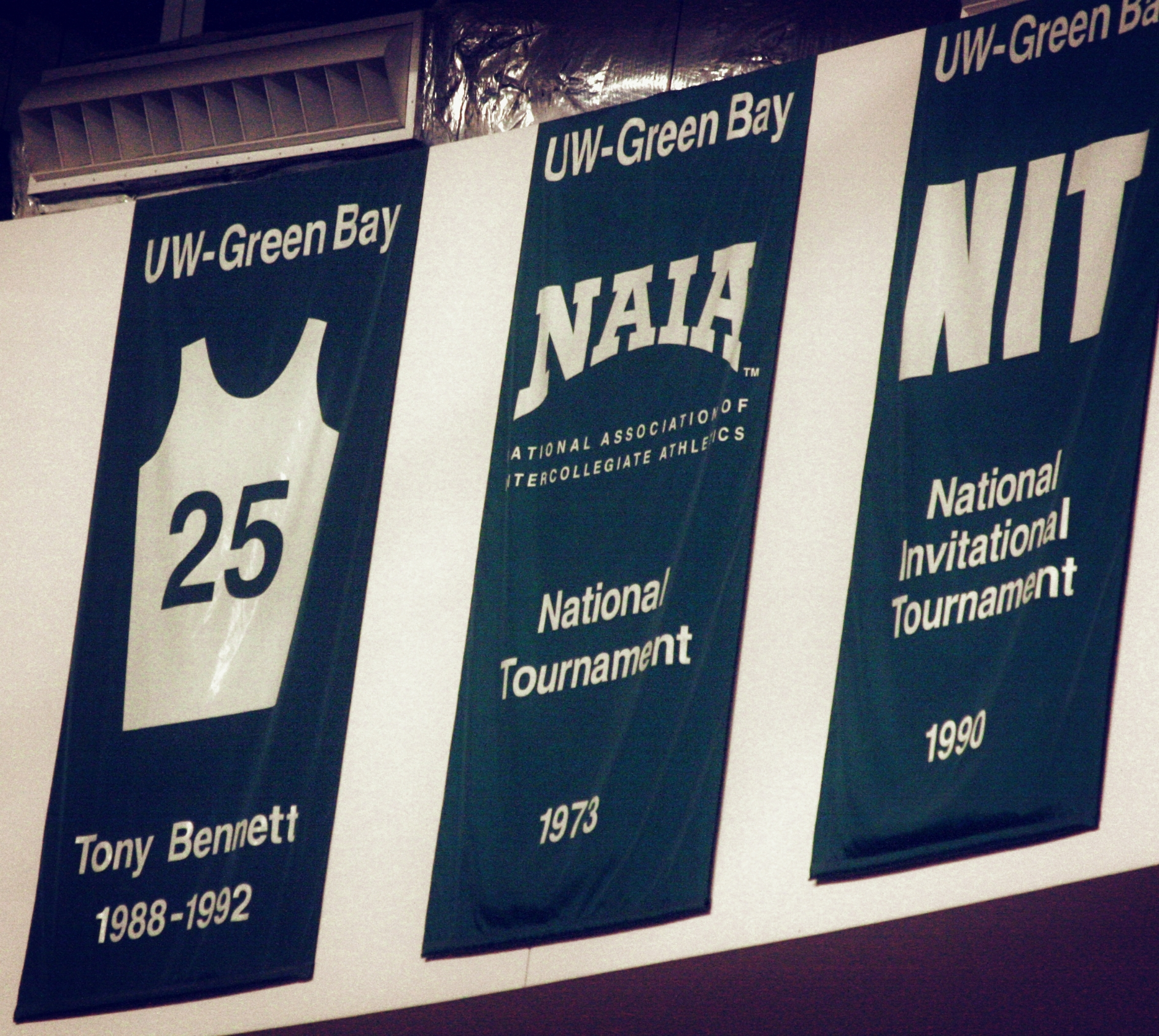
Bennett's retired #25 hangs in the rafters of the Resch Center, the home court of the Green Bay Phoenix. Bennett holds 1st place all-time for the Phoenix in both scoring and assists.

Bennett, a point guard, played for his father Dick Bennett at the University of Wisconsin–Green Bay (UWGB) following his high school career at Stevens Point Area Senior High School and Preble High School. The Bennetts led the Phoenix to an NCAA tournament berth and two appearances in the NIT. During his time there, the Green Bay Phoenix had a record of 87–34 (.719) en route to Bennett being twice named as the conference's Player of the Year. He was awarded the Frances Pomeroy Naismith Award given to the nation's most outstanding senior under six feet tall and was named the 1992 GTE Academic All-American of the year. He also started for a bronze medal-winning 1991 Pan-American Games team led by Gene Keady. He finished his collegiate career as the Mid-Continent Conference's all-time leader in points (2,285) and assists (601), and still ranks as the entire NCAA's all-time leader in 3-point field goal accuracy. He made 80 of 150 (53.3%) three-point field goal attempts in his junior season and repeated the feat of hitting over half of his three-point attempts during his senior season, making 95 of 186 (51.1%). He was also incredibly accurate on two-point field goal attempts for a guard, connecting on 502 of 917 (54.7%) two-point attempts for his college career.

=== Professional ===
Bennett went on to be selected in the 1992 NBA draft by the Charlotte Hornets. He spent three seasons (1992–1995) with steadily increasing playing time for the Hornets as the backup point guard to Muggsy Bogues (the Hornets' all-time leader in assists and steals) before a foot injury ended Bennett's NBA career. With an eye toward returning to the NBA, Bennett left for Australia in 1996 to play for the Sydney Kings of Australia's National Basketball League while rehabbing his ankle but the contract fell through within ten days of arriving and Bennett soon moved to New Zealand to briefly play for a team called the "Burger King Kings" in Auckland. Bennett has joked that the team was paid in Whoppers. He then joined the North Harbour Vikings, became its star player, and in his second year there became a dual-role player and head coach. He completed his playing career as a two-time New Zealand NBL All-Star Five honoree and a two-time Keith Carr Trophy winner for being the league's Most Outstanding Guard in both his years there.

== Coaching career ==
Bennett wanted to understand everything about the game of basketball to the point that, even as an NBA player, teammates felt he would rather learn and study the game than participate in it. Bennett's teams, especially at Virginia, are known for their motion offense and stifling defense which features his version of the "pack line" defensive strategy famously devised by his father. The pack line is designed to clog up potential driving lanes to the paint by forcing ball handlers to the middle of the floor where more "help" is concentrated. It forces opposing teams to pass and shoot well, while limiting dribble penetration and post play.

=== Coaching beginnings ===
In 1998, Bennett continued as head coach of the North Harbour Kings (who had changed their name from Vikings) but retired early as a player. His time there taught him he was able to coach without the anxiety he had seen his father experience coaching back in Wisconsin, and convinced him that he could undertake the stressful life of a coach while maintaining his integrity and peace of mind. After the 1999 season, he returned to the U.S. to become his father's team manager so that they could spend time together. Tony Bennett was then able to get a firsthand experience of Wisconsin's run to the 2000 Final Four as a part of the staff under Dick Bennett.

After his father retired, Bo Ryan retained Bennett on his staff and there he remained until 2003, when Dick Bennett came out of retirement to coach Washington State. After one season as assistant coach, Bennett was designated as his father's successor and promoted to associate head coach.

=== Washington State ===
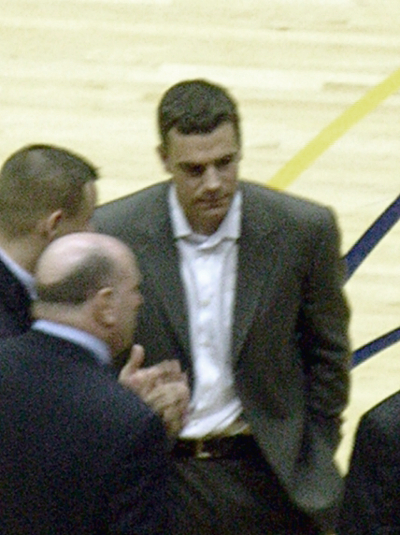
Bennett coaching Washington State in a game at Haas Pavilion against California

Tony Bennett accepted the position of head coach at Washington State when his father retired in 2006. Washington State's success immediately skyrocketed under the younger Bennett, and his 26 wins in both the 2006–07 and 2007–08 seasons tied a 66-year-old school record set by the team that reached the Championship Game of the 1941 NCAA tournament.

==== 2006–07: School record 26 wins ====
Bennett led the 2006–07 Cougars basketball team to a 26–8 (13–5 Pac-10, second place) record and the second round of the NCAA tournament. The Cougars earned a No. 3 seed and defeated Oral Roberts in the opening round before falling to Vanderbilt in double overtime in the second round. The NCAA tournament appearance was the first for the Cougars since 1994, breaking a 13-year March Madness drought for the Cougars.

After the 2006–07 season, Bennett was given the prestigious Henry Iba Award by vote of the United States Basketball Writers Association, and was named the AP college basketball Coach of the Year and the Naismith College Coach of the Year. He was also named the Rivals.com Coach of the Year.

==== 2007–08: 26 wins and Indiana offer ====
They should put up a statue of him at Washington State. To win like he did there in that program, told me right away the kid is a winner.

–Dick Vitale, ESPN, 3/2016

During the 2007–08 season, Bennett finished with a 26–9 record (11–7 in the Pac-10). He also went on to lead the Cougars to the Sweet Sixteen after beating Winthrop and Notre Dame in the first and second rounds. After losing to North Carolina in the Sweet Sixteen, Bennett's team had again reached the school record for wins, with 26.

After the season, Bennett reportedly turned down an offer to become head coach at Indiana, a job which eventually fell to Marquette coach Tom Crean. He also discussed the LSU (his wife's alma mater) vacancy at that year's Final Four, a job that eventually went to Stanford coach Trent Johnson. Bennett decided to remain loyal to WSU.

==== 2008–09: Rebuilding and budget constraints ====
Bennett went back to work at Washington State with a need to replace NBA draft pick Kyle Weaver. He brought in Klay Thompson, a talented four-star recruit out of California (and son of former NBA player Mychal Thompson). Thompson rapidly improved on the offensive side of the court as a freshman, but the team struggled more than in the two previous years on the defensive end and finished 17–16.

==== Canceled recruiting flights and Final Four trip for staff ====
Washington State dropped charter flights for Bennett and his staff for use in recruiting to the remotely located school and cancelled a trip for his staff to the 2009 Final Four due to ongoing budgetary constraints in the WSU athletics department. As this was happening, Bennett was contacted about the open Virginia job and traveled to Charlottesville to interview. While very impressed with John Paul Jones Arena and the potential advantages of coaching in the ACC, he initially decided to once again remain loyal to WSU. However, when Bennett went to call Virginia athletic director Craig Littlepage and decline the offer, Bennett's wife Laurel stepped in and said "put the phone down," as she could sense a great uncertainty in his voice when he said he would pass up UVA.

Bennett then accepted the Virginia offer on March 29 exactly one year, to the day, after turning down the Indiana job.

=== Virginia ===
Bennett was named head coach at Virginia on March 31, 2009. Ritchie McKay, head coach of the Liberty Flames, stepped down to become Bennett's associate head coach before returning to the Flames in 2015. During the rebuilding process, Bennett's teams increased their win total in every successive season. After inheriting a 10–18 squad that had the worst record in program history since the 1966–67 season, Bennett's Virginia won 15, 16, 22, 23, 30, and 30 games in his first six seasons. Under his guidance, Virginia had four of the five teams with records of 16–2 or better in the 18-game era (2012–2019) of ACC play, and only Virginia had a team finish 17–1 (none went undefeated).

Bennett worked from Day 1 to build "a program that lasts" at Virginia. He found in Charlottesville a fanbase that has really "bought in" on his defense-first mentality and tempo control, and John Paul Jones Arena is regarded as one of the toughest places to play for opposing teams of the ACC. Thousands of fans lined the streets to JPJ from Charlottesville–Albemarle Airport in 2019 to congratulate the Virginia team and Bennett on winning the program's first NCAA Championship.

==== 2009–10: Five-win improvement ====
In their first season under Bennett his new team finished the season 15–16 (5–11 in the ACC), an improvement of 5 wins (+50%) versus the prior year under Bennett's predecessor (former DePaul coach Dave Leitao). Sophomore Sylven Landesberg, a former McDonald's All-American recruited by Leitao, led the team in scoring before getting suspended for the final game of the season after failing to meet academic obligations. It was soon announced that Landesberg and the program mutually parted ways, and he turned pro but went undrafted.

==== 2010–11: Personnel losses but continued rise ====
Despite every disadvantage, including one star player (Landesberg) leaving because of academic struggles and another (Mike Scott) going down with an early-season injury and taking a medical redshirt, the Cavaliers started the season with a bang by knocking off No. 13 Minnesota on the road, in Minneapolis, during the 2010 ACC-Big Ten Challenge. UVA improved to 7–9 in the ACC and had a winning record overall. They were passed over for postseason consideration.

==== 2011–12: Most wins at UVA in 17 years ====
This season began much like the last had, with unranked Virginia dismantling No. 15 Michigan in the 2011 ACC-Big Ten Challenge. In just Bennett's third year at Virginia, he led the Cavaliers to 22 wins and an NCAA Tournament berth. It was the most wins the program had tallied in 17 years and its first NCAA Tournament game (a lopsided loss to Billy Donovan and Florida) in five years. After rapid development under Bennett over the past three years (of which he played only two because of injury), Mike Scott was taken 43rd overall by the Atlanta Hawks in the 2012 NBA draft.

==== 2012–13: Establishing the dominant nucleus ====
Based on his early successes, Athlon Sports named Bennett one of the four best ACC coaches (with Mike Krzyzewski, Roy Williams, and Leonard Hamilton) before the season. The Cavaliers would tally one more win (23) than the previous season, despite losing Mike Scott to the NBA, and establish nearly all the pieces to take the program even higher. Justin Anderson, Malcolm Brogdon, Anthony Gill, Joe Harris, Darion Atkins, Mike Tobey, and Akil Mitchell all started or played extensively for the young team. All they were missing was a controlling point guard, which Bennett found on the recruiting trail in "diamond in the rough" three-star London Perrantes from California.

==== 2013–14: #1 ACC finish and ACC Championship ====
In 2013–14, Perrantes started as a freshman and joined the top players from the previous season as the Cavaliers won their sixth ACC regular season title, clinching it with a statement 75–56 home win against highly touted ACC newcomer No. 4 Syracuse, a team which had started the season 25–0. It was also their first outright regular season title since 1981. Virginia also won its second-ever ACC Tournament title (their first since 1976), defeating second-seeded No. 7 Duke in the final game, 72–63. The Cavaliers received their third (but first since 1983) No. 1 seed in the NCAA Tournament and advanced to the Sweet Sixteen for the first time since 1995. Bennett was a finalist for the Naismith Coach of the Year, as well as runner-up for AP Coach of the Year. Bennett signed a new seven-year contract to extend his employment with Virginia through 2021. It included a $1.924 million base salary package, with additional longevity and achievement bonuses. Part of his contract negotiations included long-term contract renewals for his staff.

A guy who just oozes class, great guy, knows how to recruit his kids, develop his type of kids, coach his kids, just an unbelievable job he's doing in Charlottesville.

–Seth Davis, CBS Sports, 1/2015

==== 2014–15: #1 ACC finish and 2nd Henry Iba Award ====
Virginia got off to a 19–0 start, reaching an AP No. 2 ranking for the first time since 1983. Much was made in the press that of the top three teams, each dominating the competition and remaining undefeated well into January (Kentucky, Virginia, and Duke) the Cavaliers were doing so with no McDonald's All-Americans on the roster, whereas the Wildcats and Blue Devils had teams filled with nine each. Highlights included holding Georgia Tech, Rutgers, and Harvard to under thirty points each and actually "doubling up" the scores of Georgia Tech (57–28) and Wake Forest (70–34) – unprecedented dominance for any team of the past 50 years against ACC competition. The Harvard game was notable for a near-tripling score, 76–27 and limiting the Crimson, an NCAA Tournament team, to one field goal in the first half which tied the NCAA record for the shot clock era. Two injuries to Justin Anderson near the end of the season dampened NCAA Tournament hopes before he turned pro for the 2015 NBA draft. Bennett was awarded his second Henry Iba Award as the nation's top coach, joining ACC peer Roy Williams as the only coaches ever to win the award at two different schools. Bennett signed a new contract through 2024, later extended through 2026 and beyond.

==== 2015–16: NCAA Elite Eight ====
UVA started the season with impressive wins against eventual national champions Villanova, West Virginia, and California. The number of home-and-away series with programs from other power conferences such as these was virtually unprecedented in the ACC. Bennett was recognized for having one of the most elite offenses in the nation as well as one of the best defenses once more, and ESPN writer Jeff Goodman chose Bennett as the ideal head coach of his mythical "Dream Team" before the season... stating "I'm going with Bennett, who ... has owned the ACC the past two seasons. Just imagine what he could do with this group of players and this level of talent. Bennett will make sure these guys defend (yes, even you Niang!) and he also has the ideal, even-keeled temperament." UVA later defeated Iowa State in Niang's final collegiate game in the Sweet Sixteen, before Bennett's first loss (starting 3–0) to Jim Boeheim's Syracuse in the Elite Eight.

==== 2016–17: 250 career wins ====
UVA brought in a well-rounded recruiting class which included Bennett's first McDonald's All-American, a consensus top 50 recruit, Kyle Guy. Former five-star recruit and transfer Austin Nichols became eligible after sitting out the previous season, but was suspended for two weeks including the season opening game for an undisclosed incident and dismissed entirely for a second undisclosed incident after playing (and starting) in one game. UVA nonetheless broke its record for consecutive weeks ranked in the AP Top 25 poll with a streak of 64 polling weeks spanning more than three years, breaking its previous best of 49 in the 1980s. Bennett recorded his 250th win as a head coach against No. 14 Notre Dame, in South Bend, 71–54, while extending his record against Mike Brey to 5–0. The Cavaliers notched impressive double-digit victories over eventual national champions No. 5 North Carolina, 53–43, and No. 4 ranked Louisville, 71–55. This completed Bennett's head-to-head rivalry record against Hall of Famer Rick Pitino at 5–1 before Pitino was dismissed for NCAA rules violations in the off-season.

==== 2017–18: Unranked to AP #1 and ACC Championship ====
Tony Bennett has 65 ACC wins [in the past 4 1/2 years]. That's eight more than Roy Williams and nine more than Mike Krzyzewski. Bennett is this league's landlord.

–Matt Norlander, CBS Sports, 1/2018

UVA was viewed as a rebuilding team after departures of London Perrantes, Marial Shayok, and Darius Thompson, and the first AP poll had Virginia unranked for the first time since 2013. A Winston-Salem Journal reporter projected the worst season of Bennett's career at 5–13 in ACC play. UVA was ranked after winning the NIT Season Tip-Off. They defeated No. 12 North Carolina 61–49 to continue a home streak of 5–0 against the Heels since 2013. No. 2 Virginia then overcame No. 4 Duke on the road for Bennett's first victory at Cameron Indoor Stadium. The Winston-Salem Journal reporter literally "ate his words" about Virginia, ingesting a copy of his previous article with barbeque sauce. UNC prepared for their Duke rivalry game by reviewing tape of UVA suffocating No. 18 Clemson 61–36; Joel Berry II explained, "We want to be like [Virginia] defensively." UVA attained its first AP No. 1 ranking since 1982. With a 66–37 victory at Pitt, Virginia won its third outright regular season title in five years. The Cavaliers won the 2018 ACC tournament, defeating North Carolina 71–63 in the ACC Championship Game. UVA earned the first overall seed in the NCAA tournament, but the next day lost ACC Sixth Man of the Year De'Andre Hunter to a broken wrist. The New York Daily News changed their pick from Virginia winning the national title to losing in the Sweet Sixteen after the injury. Virginia then notoriously lost to UMBC in the opening round, the first time since expansion in 1985 that a No. 1 seed lost to a No. 16, in the first ever regional to have its No. 1, No. 2, No. 3, and No. 4 seeds all lose in the opening weekend. Bennett's even-keeled reaction was featured in Inc. magazine as a lesson in emotional intelligence and leadership. For defying rebuilding expectations to finish 31–3, Bennett won a third Henry Iba Award.

==== 2018–19: The Redemption National Championship ====
Also see 2019: Redemption National Championship section of Virginia Cavaliers men's basketball.

After a decade of proving himself as one of the very best coaches in all of college basketball, Tony Bennett shook the monkey off of his back for good as he led Virginia to the greatest redemption story in the history of sports.

–Rob Dauster, NBC Sports, 8/2019

UVA opened the season with consecutive wins over ranked Big Ten teams, No. 25 Wisconsin (Battle 4 Atlantis) and No. 24 Maryland (ACC–Big Ten Challenge), the latter of which improved Bennett's record in the Challenge to 8–2. Diminutive (5'9") point guard Kihei Clark, an unheralded three-star recruit who had initially committed to the UC Davis Aggies of the Big West Conference, started both games as a true freshman. The No. 4 Cavaliers routed No. 9 Virginia Tech 81–59 in the first time in series history that the two rivals met while both ranked in the top ten of the AP Poll. Virginia started the season 16–0 before falling at No. 1 Duke, 72–70. The game was viewed by 3.8 million people as the highest rated televised game of college basketball in the regular season, and was just the fourth in NCAA history between two teams both ranked number one as No. 4 Virginia was ranked first in the Coaches Poll before the loss. After a 16–2 ACC record, Virginia won a share of their fourth ACC regular season title in the past six years. UVA attained a No. 1 seed in the NCAA Tournament, along with Duke and North Carolina, only the second time in NCAA history that three No. 1 seeds came from the same conference. (Note: The first conference to have three No. 1 seeds in a single year was the Big East Conference in 2009, achieved in part by Pittsburgh and Louisville, which have since left the Big East and joined the ACC.) Virginia was the only No. 1 seed to reach the Final Four after dispatching Gardner-Webb 71–56, Oklahoma 63–51, Oregon 53–49, and Purdue 80–75 in overtime. The Virginia–Purdue game in particular was called an "instant classic" by Sports Illustrated and USA Today after Carsen Edwards threw up extremely long-distance three pointers well beyond NBA range and seemingly could not miss, scoring over half the total for the red-hot Boilermakers with 42 points and, by far, a new scoring record against Bennett-coached teams. Mamadi Diakite and Clark played the heroes to save the season with a backtap rebound to Clark and his subsequent bullet pass and game-tying shot from Diakite with under 1 second left to force overtime. In the Final Four, Virginia defeated the Auburn Tigers by a single point, 63–62, as Kyle Guy drained three free throws with 0.6 seconds on the clock after an Auburn player undercut his lower body on the release of a corner three-pointer just as time expired. Reigning NCAA football champion and friend Dabo Swinney sent Bennett a text prior to the title game which he shared with the team: "let the light that shines in you be brighter than the light that shines on you." Virginia did just that in a back-and-forth physical 2019 NCAA Tournament Championship Game to outlast fellow defensive stalwarts Texas Tech in overtime and win it by a score of 85–77. NABC Defensive Player of the Year redshirt sophomore De'Andre Hunter scored a career-high 27 points while holding Red Raider star Jarrett Culver to 15 points on 5-for-22 shooting. Thousands of fans lined the streets from Charlottesville–Albemarle Airport to John Paul Jones Arena the next day to welcome the team and Bennett back home. In light of the previous year's loss to UMBC, ESPN called Virginia's championship run "the most redemptive season in the history of college basketball," and NBC Sports took it a step further by calling it "the greatest redemption story in the history of sports." With little left to prove in the college game, Hunter, Jerome, and Guy forwent their remaining eligibility and all three were selected in the 2019 NBA draft; both Hunter and Jerome went in the first round. Bennett was named to a list of the World's 50 Greatest Leaders by Fortune magazine alongside such names as Special Counsel (and UVA Law alumnus) Robert Mueller, Prince Harry and Meghan Markle, and Tim Cook of Apple.

==== 2019–20: COVID-shortened season, 11–1 down final stretch ====
The Athletic named Bennett the 2019 College Basketball Person of the Year in the article "Tony Bennett: Humility and Grace made him a most deserving Champion", lauding the five pillars and the foundation they set for the Virginia program. Bennett declined a raise when extending his contract before the season and UVA President James Ryan called him "one of the most selfless people [he's] ever met." In CBS Sports' pre-season ranking, Matt Norlander opined Virginia has "arguably the best coach going in the sport." The Cavaliers won the Hall of Fame Tip Off by defeating Arizona State in the championship game. After a wrist fracture injury to Braxton Key the team was blown out at Purdue, 69–40, in an Elite Eight rematch from the previous season. It was Bennett's first loss in the ACC–Big Ten Challenge since 2013. His Cavaliers rebounded to defeat No. 7 North Carolina, 56–47, continuing a home streak of 6–0 against the Tar Heels since 2013. Virginia also defeated No. 5 Florida State, No. 7 Duke, and No. 10 Louisville. In the Duke game, Durham native Jay Huff had 10 blocks to spur the Cavaliers to victory against the Blue Devils. By the end of the season, the No. 17 Cavaliers were 23–7, had won eight straight games, 11 of their final 12, and had earned the No. 2 seed in the cancelled ACC tournament. In the last game of the season the team defeated No. 10 Louisville, 57–54, and a subsequent FiveThirtyEight article revealed this squad's defense to be the most effective of any Tony Bennett coached team thus far. The Athletic called this team Bennett's true "masterpiece", succeeding with far less talent after the previous season's NCAA Championship team lost four starters to professional basketball. Mamadi Diakite and Braxton Key graduated on an 8-game ACC winning streak but without a chance to play in the unfinished 2020 ACC tournament or to defend their NCAA Championship.

He's one of the best coaches in the country but not everyone is fit to be part of his program. He's got those five pillars... the ones that [are fit for it] become better players, better people, better men when they leave, and they win a ton of games.

–Dalen Cuff, ACC Network, 2/2021

==== 2020–21: ACC title and COVID troubles ====
Virginia opened as an early favorite to win another NCAA title two years out. However, Virginia was surprised 61–60 by unranked San Francisco in their second game, and the vaunted Cavalier defense broke down against No. 1 Gonzaga in a December neutral site game (in Fort Worth, Texas) allowing 60% shooting and 50% three-point shooting in a 98–75 loss. The program faced several postponed and canceled games due to COVID-19 outbreaks within the UVA and other basketball programs. The team rebounded to shut down No. 12 Clemson 85–50 on the road, Virginia's largest margin of victory in ACC games since 2015. When No. 9 Virginia defeated North Carolina for the seventh straight time, 60–48, it was the first time since 1966 that no UNC players scored in double figures. With that win, Bennett became the third ACC coach in history to have ten straight winning ACC seasons. Virginia clinched Bennett's fifth ACC regular season title in eight years with a victory at Louisville in the last game of the season, and was seeded No. 1 in the ACC tournament. One player had a positive COVID test following the team's quarterfinals victory over Syracuse, forcing a forfeit against Georgia Tech, which then received an effective bye to the championship game and won it. Nearly the entire UVA team was required to sit out of all team activities for seven days in quarantine after results of contact tracing; arriving a day late to the NCAA Tournament and without having practiced. Virginia's rival Louisville, which narrowly missed an NCAA bid, was put on standby in case UVA was unable to assemble a team with at least five eligible players against MAC champions Ohio. While cleared to play after being woken up for tests at 1:30 AM on the day of the game, the week in quarantine and late arrival did Virginia no favors as they shot 35% from the field and lost the game 62–58. After a highly productive 50–40–90 shooting output on the year and effective defensive play, junior Trey Murphy III was drafted 17th in the first round of the 2021 NBA draft.

==== 2021–22: Delivering a "Punch in the Mouth" ====
The Arizona Daily Star called Bennett the "gold standard of college basketball coaching" and the modern equivalent of Arizona's late Hall of Famer Lute Olson, but said Arizona fans needed to "lower [their] expectations"; Tommy Lloyd, coach-in-waiting at Gonzaga, took the job. Bennett signed transfers Armaan Franklin from Indiana and Jayden Gardner from East Carolina, after losing eight players to graduation, the NBA, and the transfer portal. The Cavaliers got off to their roughest start in a decade, losing 66–58 to Navy, 52–49 to James Madison, and 75–74 to Iowa in the ACC–Big Ten Challenge, dropping Bennett's Challenge record to 8–4. A 67–50 loss at JPJ to Clemson snapped an 11-game winning streak against the Tigers. Virginia returned the favor with a 10-point victory at Clemson, continuing a 6-game winning streak for UVA at Littlejohn Coliseum. A 74–58 road loss to North Carolina snapped a 7-game winning streak against the Tar Heels. Regaining composure, Bennett's Cavaliers held Paolo Banchero to single-digit scoring for the first time of his career as the team emerged from Cameron Indoor Stadium with a 69–68 win over AP No. 7 Duke in Mike Krzyzewski's final home game against Virginia, delivered by Reece Beekman's last-second three-pointer; Trevor Keels remarked that UVA had "punched [them] in the mouth." The Cavaliers finished 12–8 in-conference, good enough for an 11th straight winning ACC season, but the 12 regular season losses were the most yielded by UVA during that span.

==== 2022–23: 6th ACC season title ====
Virginia opened the season by winning the Continental Tire Main Event championship belt, taking the opening game over No. 5 Baylor, 86–79, and defeating No. 19 Illinois in the championship game, 70–61. UVA defeated Michigan 70–68 at Ann Arbor in UVA's final ACC–Big Ten Challenge matchup, leaving Bennett with a 9–4 record in the Challenge, and Virginia at 14–8; tied for the 2nd-most Challenge wins out of 29 participating basketball programs in the ACC and Big Ten. The Cavaliers recorded an 8th consecutive home win in their rivalry with (pre-season AP No. 1) North Carolina, 67–58, in January, then defeated the Tar Heels again, 68–59, in the 2023 ACC Tournament quarterfinals. For the season, Virginia tied with Miami at 15–5 in ACC play to share the regular season title but lost to Duke, 59–49, in the ACC Tournament championship game; they lost to Furman in the NCAA Tournament, 68–67, on an errant pass and opposing three pointer with 2 seconds left.

==== 2023–24: unusual inconsistency ====
UVA was more inconsistent in Bennett's final year than previously, but still finished 23–11 with a 13th straight winning record (13–7) in the ACC and a 12–1 record in games decided by less than 10 points. The team also lost ten games by double digits including blowout losses of 20 or more points to Wisconsin, at Memphis, at Notre Dame, at Virginia Tech, at Duke, and in the NCAA First Four to Colorado State. In particular, shooting woes from several starters allowed defenses to focus on locking down primary threats like Reece Beekman and Isaac McKneely. McKneely took steps toward becoming a more complete all-around player to pair with his catch-and-shoot sharpshooting. Beekman was the ACC Defensive Player of the Year, while sophomore Ryan Dunn led the conference in blocked shots (77) and blocks per game (2.3). Dunn subsequently declared for the 2024 NBA draft and was selected in the first round by the Denver Nuggets, while Beekman signed a two-way contract with the Golden State Warriors.

==== 2024: Retirement ====
On October 18, 2024, Bennett stunned the college basketball world by retiring at the age of 55 just 18 days before opening tipoff. He cited the state of unregulated NIL money and transfers as reasons he is "no longer equipped" to coach modern college basketball and said he hopes these new aspects of the college basketball landscape will be better regulated in time. Bennett said he'd remain around the Virginia program, and would like to take on a part-time role with "lots of vacation time." Bennett had, earlier in the year, already given Associate Head Coach Ron Sanchez "more of the reins" to implement a faster-paced offensive system in the upcoming season.

=== Los Angeles Lakers ===
On February 25, 2026, Bennett joined the Los Angeles Lakers as an NBA draft advisor.

== Player development ==
Under head coach Tony Bennett, the Cavaliers have built a program that seems to feed on itself [...] They have forged a culture that perpetuates success, regardless of the individuals on the floor, like college basketball's version of the San Antonio Spurs.

–The Ringer, 3/2018

Only the fourth former NBA player to win the NCAA Championship, Bennett developed many of his players into NCAA All-Americans and NBA draft picks. Part of Bennett's philosophy is that it's a gift to be able to play (or coach) basketball at a high level and "to give anything less than your best is to sacrifice the gift." To convey that to his players in the off-season, he's asked, "if you played [last year's version of] yourself one-on-one, could you dominate yourself now? If you can't say yes, then you have not done your job improving."

An opposing coach discussed Bennett's reputation for player development to CBS Sports in 2016, stating that he "gets the bigger picture that it's more than just basketball, and his players develop at a high level and become pros." Bennett's methods of recruiting and development was compared to the San Antonio Spurs (because of that NBA franchise's commitment to unselfishness and team success under Coach Popovich).

=== NBA ===
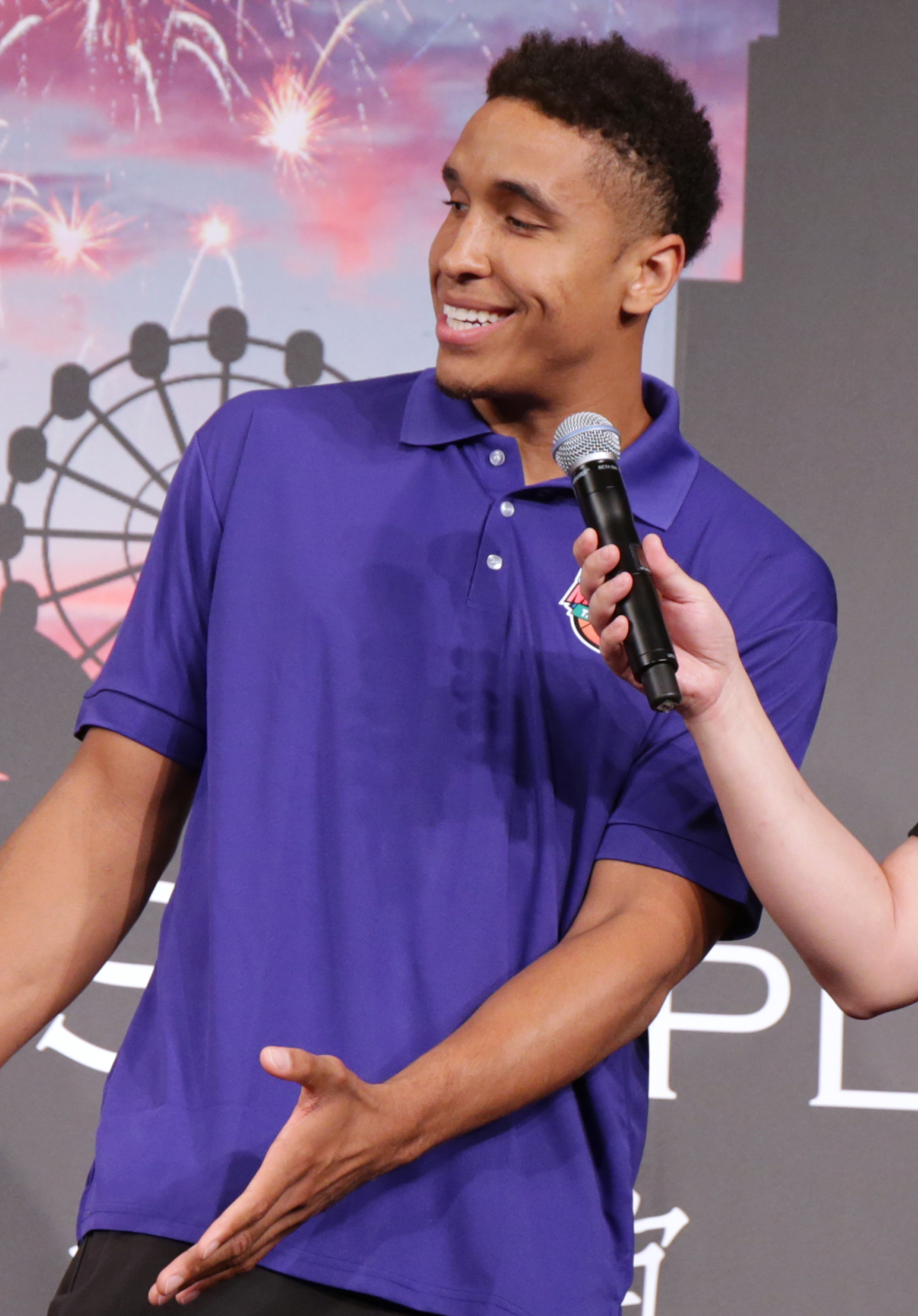
Malcolm Brogdon is the 8th member of the 50–40–90 club (the ultimate standard for shooters) in NBA history. He was NBA Rookie of the Year in 2017, the first second round pick to win the award since Willis Reed in 1965.

Eleven of Bennett's players at Virginia and Washington State were drafted into the NBA. Several of them have become widely known for their shooting prowess. Joe Harris is one of the NBA's All-Time Top 5 shooters in three-point field goal shooting percentage, led the league in 2018–19 and 2020–21, and won the Three-Point Contest over Stephen Curry at the 2019 NBA All-Star Game. Malcolm Brogdon is a member of the NBA's exclusive 50–40–90 club for extreme shooters, and Klay Thompson is, with Curry, one of the Splash Brothers of the four-time NBA champion Golden State Warriors. Sam Hauser won an NBA Championship with the '24 Boston Celtics, making 11 three-pointers in five games of the Finals.

Both of Bennett's players who were awarded NABC Defensive Player of the Year (Brogdon and De'Andre Hunter) later became NBA starters. Brogdon became NBA Rookie of the Year.

Year	Round	Pick	Player	Team
2024	1	28	Ryan Dunn	Denver Nuggets
2021	1	17	Trey Murphy III⭒	New Orleans Pelicans
2019	1	4	De'Andre Hunter	Atlanta Hawks
2019	1	24	Ty Jerome	Phoenix Suns
2019	2	55	Kyle Guy	Sacramento Kings
2019	2	54	Marial Shayok⭒	Philadelphia 76ers
2018	2	53	Devon Hall	Oklahoma City Thunder
2016	2	36	Malcolm Brogdon	Milwaukee Bucks
2015	1	21	Justin Anderson	Dallas Mavericks
2014	2	33	Joe Harris	Cleveland Cavaliers
2012	2	43	Mike Scott	Atlanta Hawks
2011	1	11	Klay Thompson⭒	Golden State Warriors
2008	2	38	Kyle Weaver	Charlotte Bobcats

⭒Murphy III, Shayok, and Thompson also played for other head coaches at Rice, Iowa State, and Washington State (after Bennett became Virginia's coach) respectively.

Undrafted Bennett players to see significant NBA minutes include Sam Hauser (NBA Champion with '24 Boston Celtics), Mamadi Diakite (NBA Champion with '21 Milwaukee Bucks), Aron Baynes (NBA Champion with '14 San Antonio Spurs), Jay Huff, Braxton Key, and Anthony Gill.

=== Professional ===
Other Bennett players to play in professional basketball leagues around the globe include London Perrantes, Mike Tobey, Jack Salt, Akil Mitchell, Darion Atkins, Marcus Capers, Mustapha Farrakhan Jr., Sylven Landesberg, Laurynas Mikalauskas, Jerome Meyinsse, Austin Nichols, Taylor Rochestie, and Sammy Zeglinski.

=== College ===
Six Virginia Cavaliers developed under Bennett into winning NCAA All-America honors and/or national awards.

NABC Defensive Player of the Year

- Malcolm Brogdon, 2016
- De'Andre Hunter, 2019

Lefty Driesell Award

- Darion Atkins, 2015

NCAA Tournament Most Outstanding Player

- Kyle Guy, 2019

First Team All-American

- Malcolm Brogdon, 2016

Second Team All-American

- Malcolm Brogdon, 2015
- De'Andre Hunter, 2019 (Note: The NABC named Hunter to the second team, and the AP, USBWA, and Sporting News named Hunter to the third team.)

Third Team All-American

- Mike Scott, 2012
- Justin Anderson, 2015
- Kyle Guy, 2018, 2019

=== Off-court ===
The Bennett family pledged $500,000 to fund a career development program specifically for current and former members of the Virginia basketball program who are beginning or advancing careers away from basketball.

== Personal life ==
Bennett is married and has two children, one son and one daughter. Bennett met his wife Laurel (née Purcell) at a church in nearby North Carolina, while he was playing for the Charlotte Hornets. He is a Christian and would likely have become a pastor if not a college basketball coach. He has spoken about his faith saying, "When you have a relationship with the Lord, there's a peace and perspective you have. The world didn't give it, and the world can't take it away." Bennett has also cited his faith as impacting his coaching philosophy, in particular his use of his father's "Five Pillars": humility, passion, unity, servanthood, and thankfulness.

A member of a coaching family tree, he is the son of former head coach Dick Bennett (Washington State, Wisconsin, Green Bay, and Wisconsin–Stevens Point) and brother of former head coach Kathi Bennett (Northern Illinois and Indiana). The "pack line" defense that the younger Bennett used at Virginia was first implemented in an earlier form by the elder Bennett up until Tony took over head coaching duties from his father at Washington State.

== Career playing statistics ==
Legend
GP	Games played	GS	Games started	MPG	Minutes per game
FG%	Field goal percentage	3P%	3-point field goal percentage	FT%	Free throw percentage
RPG	Rebounds per game	APG	Assists per game	SPG	Steals per game
BPG	Blocks per game	PPG	Points per game	**Bold**	Career high

=== NCAA ===
Year	Team	GP	GS	MPG	FG%	3P%	FT%	RPG	APG	SPG	BPG	PPG
1988–89	Green Bay	27	27	34.4	.522	.439	.847	2.0	5.1	**1.8**	.0	19.1
1989–90	Green Bay	30	29	36.0	.504	.482	**.859**	2.2	**5.2**	1.3	.1	16.6
1990–91	Green Bay	**31**	**30**	**36.1**	**.547**	**.533**	.836	2.4	5.0	1.2	.1	**21.5**
1991–92	Green Bay	30	28	33.2	.534	.511	.826	**2.9**	5.1	1.2	**.2**	20.2
Career		118	114	34.9	.528	**.497**^	.840	2.4	5.1	1.4	.1	19.4

^ NCAA Record

=== NBA ===
==== Regular season ====
Year	Team	GP	GS	MPG	FG%	3P%	FT%	RPG	APG	SPG	BPG	PPG
1992–93	Charlotte	**75**	2	11.4	.423	.325	.732	.8	1.8	.4	.0	3.7
1993–94	Charlotte	74	**5**	13.3	.399	**.360**	**.733**	**1.2**	**2.2**	**.5**	.0	3.4
1994–95	Charlotte	3	0	**15.3**	**.462**	.222	–	.7	1.3	.0	.0	**4.7**
Career		152	7	12.4	.412	.335	.732	1.0	2.0	.5	.0	3.5

==== Playoffs ====
Year	Team	GP	GS	MPG	FG%	3P%	FT%	RPG	APG	SPG	BPG	PPG
1993	Charlotte	8	0	10.8	.480	.500	1.000	1.1	1.6	.3	.1	3.8

== Head coaching record ==
The Five Pillars

HUMILITY: Know Who We Are
PASSION: Do Not Be Lukewarm
UNITY: Do Not Divide Our House
SERVANTHOOD: Make Teammates Better
THANKFULNESS: Learn From Each Circumstance

Record table
Season	Team	Overall	Conference	Standing	Postseason
Washington State Cougars (Pacific-10 Conference) (2006–2009)
2006–07	Washington State	26–8	13–5	2nd	NCAA Division I Round of 32
2007–08	Washington State	26–9	11–7	3rd	NCAA Division I Sweet 16
2008–09	Washington State	17–16	8–10	7th	NIT first round
Washington State:		69–33 (.676)	32–22 (.593)		
Virginia Cavaliers (Atlantic Coast Conference) (2009–2024)
2009–10	Virginia	15–16	5–11	T–9th	
2010–11	Virginia	16–15	7–9	T–7th	
2011–12	Virginia	22–10	9–7	T–4th	NCAA Division I Round of 64
2012–13	Virginia	23–12	11–7	T–4th	NIT quarterfinal
2013–14	Virginia	30–7	16–2	1st	NCAA Division I Sweet 16
2014–15	Virginia	30–4	16–2	1st	NCAA Division I Round of 32
2015–16	Virginia	29–8	13–5	T–2nd	NCAA Division I Elite Eight
2016–17	Virginia	23–11	11–7	T–5th	NCAA Division I Round of 32
2017–18	Virginia	31–3	17–1	1st	NCAA Division I Round of 64
2018–19	Virginia	35–3	16–2	T–1st	NCAA Division I Champion
2019–20	Virginia	23–7	15–5	T–2nd	No postseason held (COVID-19)
2020–21	Virginia	18–7	13–4	1st	NCAA Division I Round of 64
2021–22	Virginia	21–14	12–8	6th	NIT quarterfinal
2022–23	Virginia	25–8	15–5	T–1st	NCAA Division I Round of 64
2023–24	Virginia	23–11	13–7	3rd	NCAA Division I First Four
Virginia:		364–136 (.728)	189–82 (.697)		
Total:		433–169 (.719)			
National champion Postseason invitational champion Conference regular season champion Conference regular season and conference tournament champion Division regular season champion Division regular season and conference tournament champion Conference tournament champion

ACC Rival	Wins	Losses	Win %
Louisville	19	2	.905
Virginia Tech	19	10	.655
North Carolina	14	10	.583
Maryland (Note: Maryland is no longer in the ACC after the 2013–14 season. The head-to-head (but not overall) record total here includes ACC–Big Ten Challenge games after that year for the former ACC rivals.)	8	4	.667

=== Against rivals ===
Bennett had a winning record against each of the team's ACC rivals and drew praise from rival coaches. Hall of Famer Rick Pitino (1–5 against Bennett) of Louisville said, "there is no such thing as post-play against Virginia"; similarly former Virginia Tech coach Buzz Williams (3–8 against Bennett) called Virginia's system "offensively and defensively elite."

Bennett was 60–26 in UVA's Virginia's rivalry games versus Virginia Tech, Louisville, Maryland, and North Carolina. Bennett "flipped the script" against North Carolina in particular, leading the program to a 14–10 record versus UNC, including the 2018 ACC tournament championship, against a program that had continually frustrated Virginia (in several ACC tournaments and the 1981 Final Four) when the two conference rivals perennially topped college basketball polls of the early 1980s. Bennett's UVA teams went a perfect 7–0 in his final seven games against Hall of Famer Roy Williams (7–12 against Bennett) to close out a friendly rivalry during the final five years of Williams' tenure at UNC (during which period both Williams, in 2017; and Bennett, in 2019; won NCAA Championships). The prior best streak for Virginia against North Carolina was six straight wins, more than a century earlier, from 1911 to 1916 under program founder Pop Lannigan.
