= Javier Mendiburu =

Spanish basketball player

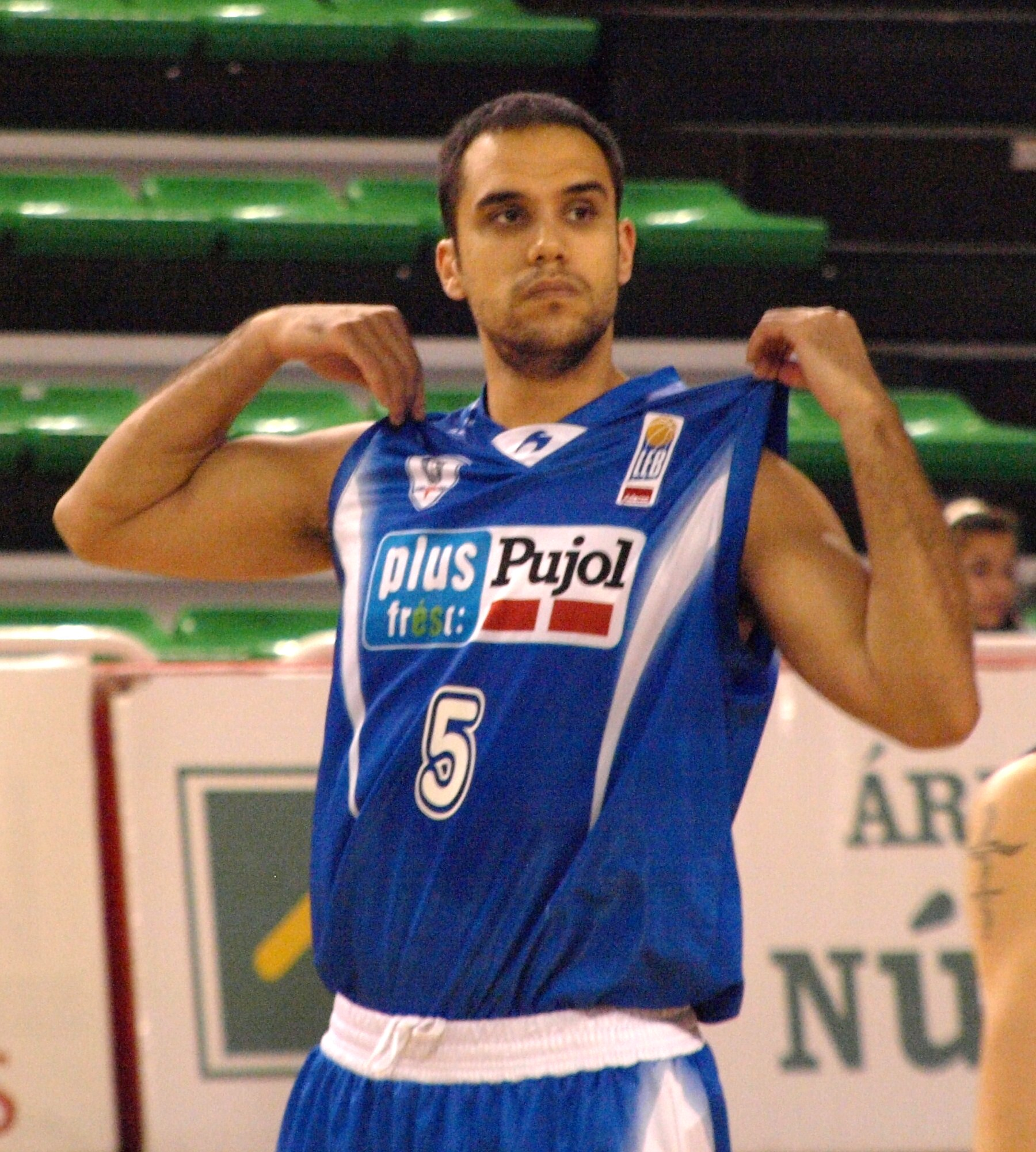

Personal information
- Born: December 1, 1980 (age 45) Badalona, Spain
- Listed height: 6 ft 5.5 in (1.97 m)
- Listed weight: 222 lb (101 kg)

Career information
- College: Indian Hills CC (2001–2003); Green Bay (2003–2005)
- NBA draft: 2005: undrafted
- Playing career: 1998–present
- Position: Point guard / shooting guard

Career history
- 1997–1998: Joventut Badalona (youth team)
- 1998–1999: CB Sant Josep
- 1999–2000: BC Martorell
- 2000–2001: CB Cornellà
- 2005–2007: Estudiantes
- 2007–2008: ViveMenorca
- 2008–2009: Plus Pujol Lleida
- 2009–2010: Servindustria Tarragona 2017
- 2010–2011: CB Castellbisbal
- 2011–2012: CB Montcada

Francisco Javier Mendiburu Urgell (born December 1, 1980) is a Spanish basketball player, playing the point guard or the shooting guard position.

== Honors ==
Clubs Honors

- LEB2 Champion - 2000/2001

== Career statistics ==
Correct as of 12 July 2007

Season	Team	League	GP	MPG	RPG	APG	PPG
2005-06	Estudiantes	ACB	24	14	1.2	1.5	3.9
2006-07	Estudiantes	ACB	33	18	2.3	2.8	3.6

Playoffs	Team	League	GP	MPG	RPG	APG	PPG
2005-06	Estudiantes	ACB	3	12	2	0.3	2.7
