= Jeff Nordgaard =

American/Polish basketball player (born 1973)

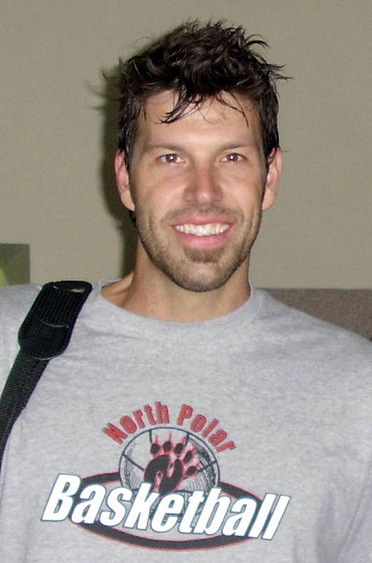

Personal information
- Born: February 23, 1973 (age 53) Dawson, Minnesota, U.S.
- Listed height: 6 ft 7 in (2.01 m)
- Listed weight: 225 lb (102 kg)

Career information
- High school: Dawson-Boyd (Dawson, Minnesota)
- College: Green Bay (1992–1996)
- NBA draft: 1996: 2nd round, 53rd overall pick
- Drafted by: Milwaukee Bucks
- Playing career: 1996–2009
- Position: Small forward
- Number: 9

Career history
- 1996: Dijon
- 1997: Patronato Bilbao
- 1997: Milwaukee Bucks
- 1997–1998: Fort Wayne Fury
- 1998–1999: Viola Reggio Calabria
- 1999–2000: Besançon
- 2000: Indiana Legends
- 2000–2001: Chalon
- 2001–2003: Anwil Włocławek
- 2003–2004: Polonia Warsaw
- 2004: Roseto
- 2004–2005: Olympiacos
- 2005: Polonia Warsaw
- 2005–2007: Prokom Trefl Sopot
- 2007–2009: AZS Koszalin

Career highlights
- MCC Player of the Year (1996); 2× First-team All-MCC (1995, 1996); MCC tournament MVP (1995)
- Stats at NBA.com
- Stats at Basketball Reference

Jeff Wallace Nordgaard (born February 23, 1973) is an American-born naturalized Polish former professional basketball player who played briefly in the National Basketball Association (NBA), as well several top-level European leagues, during his 13-year career. He played college basketball for the Green Bay Phoenix.

== Early life ==
Nordgaard's father, John Nordgaard, was a biology teacher and guidance counselor at Dawson-Boyd High School and at one time its head basketball coach. When playing basketball at Dawson-Boyd High School in 1990, as a junior, Jeff scored 41 points in an 86–78 win over Canby, to set a new team record. In 1991, he became the first player in Minnesota state history to achieve a quadruple double, recording 37 points, 14 rebounds, 11 assists, and 12 blocks.

== Basketball career ==
He played college basketball for the Green Bay Phoenix at the University of Wisconsin–Green Bay. He finished his college hoops career in March 1996 and in May was named "Basketball Man of the Year" in Wisconsin. Nordgaard was drafted by the Milwaukee Bucks in the second round of the 1996 NBA draft. He began his professional career in Europe, spending the 1996–97 season with two clubs, Dijon (France) and Patronato Bilbao (Spain 2nd). The following season he briefly played for the Bucks before finishing the season with the CBA's Fort Wayne Fury.

Nordgaard then returned to Europe, first going to Viola Reggio Calabria in Italy for the 1998–99 season, where he was a teammate of future NBA star Manu Ginóbili. The next season he returned to France with Besançon BCD. Nordgaard briefly returned to America in 2000 with the Indiana Legends in the ABA before signing a contract that brought him back to France with Chalon.

In 2001 Nordgaard went to Poland, joining Anwil Włocławek. He then moved to Polonia Warsaw in 2003. Nordgaard was especially well-traveled in the 2004–05 season, first returning to Italy to play for Roseto, transferring to Greek power Olympiacos, and ending the season back at Polonia. The following year he signed with another Polish club, Prokom Trefl Sopot, and stayed there through the 2006–07 season. Nordgaard moved to AZS Koszalin for the 2007–08 season and decided to stay for the 2008–09 season.

== Personal life ==
During his time in Poland, Nordgaard gained Polish citizenship, and played for the Polish national team. On February 15, 2003, Nordgaard and his wife Alexis had a son, Dawson John. In 2005, another son, Langdon, was born. His sister Chari also played basketball at University of Wisconsin–Green Bay. Nordgaard's nephew Kon Knueppel currently plays for the Charlotte Hornets.

== Career statistics ==
Legend
GP	Games played	GS	Games started	MPG	Minutes per game
FG%	Field goal percentage	3P%	3-point field goal percentage	FT%	Free throw percentage
RPG	Rebounds per game	APG	Assists per game	SPG	Steals per game
BPG	Blocks per game	PPG	Points per game	**Bold**	Career high

=== NBA ===
==== Regular season ====
Year	Team	GP	GS	MPG	FG%	3P%	FT%	RPG	APG	SPG	BPG	PPG
1997–98	Milwaukee	13	0	3.7	.278	–	.889	1.1	.2	.2	.0	1.4
