= Wright State Raiders men's basketball =

NCAA Division I basketball team that represents Wright State University

2026–27 Wright State Raiders men's basketball team
- University: Wright State University
- Head coach: Clint Sargent (3rd season)
- Location: Fairborn, Ohio
- Arena: Nutter Center (capacity: 9,500)
- Conference: Horizon League
- Nickname: Raiders
- Colors: Hunter green and vegas gold
- Student section: Raider Rowdies

NCAA Division I tournament appearances
- 1976*, 1979*, 1980*, 1981*, 1982*, 1983*, 1985*, 1986*, 1993, 2007, 2018, 2022, 2026

NCAA Division II tournament champions
- 1983
Other NCAA Division II tournament results
Final Four	1983
Elite Eight	1983, 1986
Sweet Sixteen	1983, 1985, 1986

Conference tournament champions
- Mid-Continent Conference; 1993; Horizon League; 2007, 2018, 2022, 2026

Conference regular-season champions
- Horizon League; 2007, 2019, 2020, 2021, 2026

Uniforms
Home	Away	Alternate
- * at Division II level

The Wright State Raiders men's basketball is the men's college basketball team that represents Wright State University in Fairborn, Ohio. The school's team currently competes in the Horizon League at the NCAA Division I level. The Raiders won their only national championship in 1983 as an NCAA Division II school. Wright State has made a total of five NCAA Division I men's basketball tournament appearances, most recently in 2026. The Raiders play their home games at the Nutter Center and are led by head coach Clint Sargent.

== History ==
Wright State first sponsored men's basketball in 1970 under the direction of Coach John Ross. Players from the first team included Doug Meeks (Captain), Mark Beilinski, Jerry Butcher, Mark Donahue, Jerry Hecht, John Hildebrand, Chuck Horton, Jim Schellhase, Doug Taylor, Jim Thacker. Mike Zink. Paul Brown, and Gary Webb. Jim Thacker was named the MVP and Chuck Horton, Mark Donahue and John Hildebrand took the foul shooting honors. In 1983, Wright State won the Division II NCAA tournament. Wright State moved to Division I in 1987, and have made NCAA tournament appearances in 1993, 2007, 2018, 2022, and 2026.

=== Marcus Jackson era (1975–1978) ===
Marcus Jackson took over for John Ross in 1975 and led the Raiders to its first 20-win season and first NCAA tournament appearance. Jackson had joined Wright State following highly regarded seasons at Coe College and Dartmouth College. His philosophy was up-tempo and high-scoring: "Basketball is a spectator sport and we aim to entertain the people . . . We will not be robots on the basketball court. We intend to make WSU basketball an exciting sport for all concerned and form a lasting impression on our fans."

After taking some lumps as a young team in 1976–77, by 1977–78 Jackson had his Raiders running hot again, but a losing streak at the end of the season and arguments with the athletic administration brought his tenure to an early end. Jackson's legacy at Wright State was laying a solid foundation that helped to launch the high-flying basketball years that followed.

=== Ralph Underhill era (1978–1996) ===
Ralph Underhill was the most successful coach in Wright State history, with a career total of 356 wins, including leading the team to an NCAA Division II National Championship in the 1982–83 season.

In 1999–2000 Israel Sheinfeld playing for the Raiders led the Midwestern Collegiate Conference in field goal percentage, at .543, and in rebounds per game, at 7.7. He was named to the 2000 All-MCC first team. In 2000–2001 he led the conference in two-point field goal percentage, at .595.

=== Paul Biancardi era (2003–2005) ===
On April 8, 2003, Wright State announced that Paul Biancardi would be the new head coach. Before coaching Wright State, Biancardi was an assistant at St. Louis, Boston College and Ohio State where he coached under Jim O'Brien. Recognized nationally, Biancardi was named the No. 1 assistant coach in the country by Hoop Scoop Online. In his first season as coach, Wright State finished with a 14–14 record and finished 5th in the Horizon League Standings with a 10–6 conference record and lost to Loyola (IL) in the first round of the conference tournament. In the 2004–2005 season Wright State would finish with a 15–15 while finishing 6th in the conference standings with an 8–8 record. During the Horizon League tournament the Raiders would beat Butler in the first round but lost to Detroit in the second round. In 2005–2006, Wright State's final record was 13–15, with an 8–8 conference record they would finish 7th in the standings. The Raiders would once again have an early exit from the Horizon League tournament, losing to UIC in the first round. Despite never having a winning season in the three seasons that Biancardi coached at Wright State, it was his recruiting classes that would set the Raiders up for success in the future. Wright State and Biancardi agreed to part after the NCAA barred him from recruiting for violating rules while he was an assistant at Ohio State. Biancardi's final record at Wright State was 42–44.

=== Brad Brownell era (2006–2009) ===
Brad Brownell left his position with UNC Wilmington to take over the head coaching duties at Wright State beginning in the 2006–2007 basketball season. In his first season, Wright State was the regular season Horizon League Champion, going 23–10 overall, and 13–3 in conference play. Their 3 losses were at Youngstown State, at Butler, and at Milwaukee. In an impressive season, Wright State only lost one home game all season, that was a 3-point loss to Bowling Green. In the Horizon League Championship game, Wright State edged Butler 60–55 at the Nutter Center, and secured an automatic bid in the NCAA tournament. They eventually earned a 14 seed, and lost in the first round to the Pittsburgh Panthers.

The next three seasons were not as successful for Brownell as his first. Wright State finished 3rd, 3rd, and 2nd respectfully over the 2007, 2008, and 2009 seasons. However, Brad did lead Wright State to 20-win seasons in each of his four years with the program. After the conclusion of the 2009–2010 season, Brad Brownell left Wright State to take the head coaching job at Clemson University.

Brownell finished his coaching at Wright State officially 84–45 and 49–21 in conference play in 4 completed seasons. More impressively, Brownell finished 58–10 in home contests over his 4-year tenure.

=== Billy Donlon era (2010–2016) ===
Billy Donlon took over the Wright State Men's Basketball program in 2010 after the announcement that Brad Brownell would be leaving for Clemson. In the 2012–2013 season, after being projected to finish last in the league, Wright State finished 3rd in the Horizon League, and earned a first round bye in the Horizon League tournament. Wright State would beat Youngstown State in the second round of the tournament to advance to the conference semi-finals where they would play the defending Horizon League tournament champion Detroit. Miles Dixon hit a baseline jumper from behind the backboard as time expired, lifting Wright State into the Horizon League tournament championship game for the first time since the 2009–2010 season. The team went on to lose to Valparaiso in the Horizon League Championship game by 6 points. Wright State was invited to the College Basketball Invitational where they would make it to the semi-finals before losing to eventual tournament champion Tulsa. Billy Donlon also earned the Horizon League Coach of the Year award for Wright State's performance in the 2012–2013 season.

Over his six seasons he accumulated an overall record 109–94 vs DI and non DI competition.

=== Scott Nagy era (2016–2024) ===
Following the firing of Billy Donlon after the 2015–2016 season, Wright State hired then South Dakota State University head coach Scott Nagy to head their program. He was the highest paid coach in Raider history with an annual salary of $500k. In Nagy's first season the Raiders went 20–12 and 11–7 in league. The Raiders lost to NKU in the 4/5 match-up in the Horizon League Tournament. The Raiders chose not to participate in postseason play.

In his second season, Nagy's Raiders finished second in the Horizon League regular season (even though they swept #1 seed NKU) with a conference record of 14–4. The Raiders won the Horizon League Tournament and clinched their first NCAA tournament berth since 2007.

His Raiders teams continued to set the standard in the Horizon League reeling off 20 win seasons and returning to the NCAA tournament in 2022. However, his final two seasons were marked by inconsistent play, poor defense and multiple player defections. The frustration seemed to mount with each passing week, culminating with Nagy leaving for the head coaching job at Southern Illinois.

== Retired numbers ==
Wright State has retired one jersey number in its history.

Wright State Raiders retired numbers
No.	Player	Pos.	Career	Ref.
42	Bill Edwards	SF/PF	1989–93	

== Facilities ==
The Wright State Raiders currently play their home games at the Ervin J. Nutter Center. Ervin J. Nutter, donated $1.5 million to Wright State University in 1986. Funds from both the state of Ohio and the university contributed an additional $8 million to construction efforts which began in 1988. Completed in 1990, Wright State would host the first event on December 1 where they would defeat Tennessee State 88–66.

== Coaches ==
The Raiders have had 10 coaches. Current head coach Clint Sargent was hired in 2024. Scott Nagy was the head coach from 2016 to 2024. Billy Donlon was the head coach from 2010 to 2016 after Brad Brownell was announced as the new Clemson head coach. Brownell was the second coach to take Wright State to the NCAA tournament following the winningest coach in team history, Ralph Underhill. Underhill coached from 1978 to 1996 and accumulated 356 wins at Wright State and an NCAA DII national championship in the 1982–83 season.

Coach	Career	Overall record	Winning %
John Ross	1970–71 to 1974–75	65–54	.546
Marcus Jackson	1975–76 to 1977–78	45–37	.549
Ralph Underhill	1978–79 to 1995–96	356–162	.687
Jim Brown	1996–97	7–20	.259
Ed Schilling	1997–98 to 2002–03	75–93	.446
Paul Biancardi	2003–04 to 2005–06	42–44	.488
Brad Brownell	2006–07 to 2009–10	84–45	.651
Billy Donlon	2010–11 to 2015–16	108–94	.535
Scott Nagy	2016–17 to 2023-24	167–90	.650
Clint Sargent	2024–25 to Present	38–30	.559
NCAA DII Record (1970–1986):		299–136	.687
NCAA DI Record (1987–present):		689–534	.563
Overall Record:		988-670	.596

=== Current coaching staff ===
Name	Position
Clint Sargent	Head coach
Travis Trice	Associate Head Coach
Dan Beré	Associate Head Coach
Jaaron Simmons	Assistant Coach
Nick Goff	Director of Operations

== Season-by-season records ==
=== WSU's records season by season during their Division II tenure ===
Season	Head coach	Overall record	Conf. record	Standing	Postseason
Division II Independent
1970–71	John Ross	7–17	–	–	–
1971–72	John Ross	9–14	–	–	–
1972–73	John Ross	17–5	–	–	–
1973–74	John Ross	17–8	–	–	–
1974–75	John Ross	15–10	–	–	–
1975–76	Marcus Jackson	20–8	–	–	NCAA D-II Regional
1976–77	Marcus Jackson	11–16	–	–	–
1977–78	Marcus Jackson	14–13	–	–	–
1978–79	Ralph Underhill	20–8	–	–	NCAA D-II Regional
1979–80	Ralph Underhill	25–3	–	–	NCAA D-II Regional
1980–81	Ralph Underhill	25–4	–	–	NCAA D-II Regional
1981–82	Ralph Underhill	22–7	–	–	NCAA D-II Regional
1982–83	Ralph Underhill	28–4	–	–	NCAA D-II National champions
1983–84	Ralph Underhill	19–9	–	–	–
1984–85	Ralph Underhill	22–7	–	–	NCAA D-II Regional
1985–86	Ralph Underhill	28–3	–	–	NCAA D-II Quarterfinals
1986–87	Ralph Underhill	20–8	–	–	–

=== WSU's records season by season since joining Division I in 1987 ===
Season	Head coach	Overall record	Conf. record	Standing	Postseason
Division I Independent
1987–88	Ralph Underhill	16–11	–	–	–
1988–89	Ralph Underhill	17–11	–	–	–
1989–90	Ralph Underhill	21–7	–	–	–
1990–91	Ralph Underhill	19–9	–	–	–
Mid-Continent Conference
1991–92	Ralph Underhill	15–13	9–7	T–4th	–
1992–93	Ralph Underhill	20–10	10–6	T–2nd	NCAA 1st Round
1993–94	Ralph Underhill	12–18	9–9	T–4th	–
Midwestern Collegiate Conference
1994–95	Ralph Underhill	13–17	6–8	8th	–
1995–96	Ralph Underhill	14–13	8–8	T–4th	–
1996–97	Jim Brown	7–20	5–11	8th	–
1997–98	Ed Schilling	10–18	3–11	7th	–
1998–99	Ed Schilling	9–18	4–10	7th	–
1999–2000	Ed Schilling	11–17	6–8	T–4th	–
2000–01	Ed Schilling	18–11	8–6	4th	–
Horizon League
2001–02	Ed Schilling	17–11	8–6	T–4th	–
2002–03	Ed Schilling	10–18	4–12	T–6th	–
2003–04	Paul Biancardi	14–14	10–6	T–4th	–
2004–05	Paul Biancardi	15–15	8–8	T–4th	–
2005–06	Paul Biancardi	13–15	8–8	T–3rd	–
2006–07	Brad Brownell	23–10	13–3	T–1st	NCAA 1st Round
2007–08	Brad Brownell	21–10	12–6	T–2nd	–
2008–09	Brad Brownell	20–13	12–6	T–3rd	–
2009–10	Brad Brownell	20–12	12–6	2nd	–
2010–11	Billy Donlon	19–14	10–8	T–5th	–
2011–12	Billy Donlon	13–19	7–11	8th	–
2012–13	Billy Donlon	21–12	10–6	T–3rd	CBI Semi-Finals
2013–14	Billy Donlon	21–15	10–6	3rd	CIT 2nd Round
2014–15	Billy Donlon	11–20	3–13	8th	–
2015–16	Billy Donlon	22–13	13–5	T–2nd	–
2016–17	Scott Nagy	20–12	11–7	5th	–
2017–18	Scott Nagy	25–9	14–4	2nd	NCAA 1st Round
2018–19	Scott Nagy	21–13	13–5	T–1st	NIT 1st Round
2019–20	Scott Nagy	25–7	15–3	1st	NIT (Note: No tournaments held due to the COVID-19 pandemic.)
2020–21	Scott Nagy	18–6	16–4	T–1st	–
2021–22	Scott Nagy	22–14	15–7	T–3rd	NCAA 1st Round
2022–23	Scott Nagy	18–15	10–10	T–6th	–
2023–24	Scott Nagy	18–14	13–7	T–3rd	–
2024–25	Clint Sargent	15–18	8–12	8th	–
2025–26	Clint Sargent	23–12	15–5	1st	NCAA 1st Round

== Record vs. Horizon League opponents ==
Opponent	Wins	Losses	Pct.	Streak
Cleveland State	48	41	.539	WSU 2
Detroit	45	29	.608	WSU 1
Green Bay	42	36	.538	WSU 2
IU Indy	27	4	.871	WSU 3
Milwaukee	41	36	.532	WSU 2
Northern Kentucky	35	18	.660	WSU 3
Oakland	23	12	.657	WSU 3
Purdue Ft. Wayne	14	8	.636	WSU 2
Robert Morris	10	5	.697	RM 3
Youngstown State	51	22	.699	WSU 1

== Rivalries ==
=== Dayton ===
The Wright State University and University of Dayton series is known as the Gem City Jam. The two universities are located in Dayton, Ohio, only 10 miles apart from each other. Although the two schools no longer compete head to head in men's basketball, they still compete against each other in other sports. The series currently favors Dayton at 5–3. The last meeting was held at the University of Dayton on December 13, 1997; Dayton won 94–63.

Date	Location	Result
March 5, 1988	Dayton	L 71–89
January 6, 1990	Dayton	W 101–99
December 11, 1993	Dayton	L 56–83
January 8, 1994	Wright State	W 77–65
December 12, 1994	Wright State	W 74–53
December 9, 1995	Dayton	L 80–98
January 9, 1997	Wright State	L 63–72
December 13, 1997	Dayton	L 63–94

=== Northern Kentucky ===
The Wright State and Northern Kentucky series began in 1972 where both schools would routinely compete against each other up until 1987 when Wright State moved to division 1. The series would be reignited in 2015 when Northern Kentucky joined the Horizon League. Wright State currently leads the series 34–18.

=== Other rivals ===
Although it may not be considered a rivalry, Wright State and Miami (OH) have played a total of 41 times since 1972, with Miami leading the series 22–19.

Wright State and Cleveland State have been conference rivals since the 1991-92 season. The CSU Vikings have played more games against the Wright State Raiders than any other rival.

== All-time statistical leaders ==
=== Career leaders ===
All Time Career Records
Category	Player	Total	Seasons
Points Scored	Bill Edwards	2,303	1989–90 1990–91 1991–92 1992–93
Assists	Mark Woods	744	1988–89 1989–90 1990–91 1991–92 1992–93
3-Point Field Goals	Grant Benzinger	291	2014–15 2015–16 2016–17 2017–18
Rebounds	Loudon Love	1,203	2017–18 2018–19 2019–20 2020–21
Blocks	Loudon Love	138	2017–18 2018–19 2019–20 2020–21
Steals	Mark Woods	314	1988–89 1989–90 1990–91 1991–92 1992–93

=== Single-season leaders ===
All Time Best Seasons
Category	Player	Total	Season
Points Scored	Bill Edwards	757	1992-93
Assists	Lenny Lyons	259	1985-86
3-Point Field Goals	Cain Doliboa	104	2001-02
Rebounds	Loudon Love	341	2018-19
Blocks	Grant Basile	59	2021-22
Steals	Mark Woods	109	1992-93

=== Single-game leaders ===
All Time Best Games
Category	Player	Total	Day
Points Scored	Bill Edwards	45	Dec 8, 1992
Assists	Lenny Lyons	15	Feb 8, 1986; Feb 27, 1986
3-Point Field Goals	Marcus Mumphrey	9	Jan 20, 1988; Feb 20, 1989; Feb 9, 1991
Rebounds	Thad Burton	22	Nov 18, 1997
Steals	Mark Woods	8	Dec 5, 1992

=== Team Statistical Records ===
Wright State Team Record Seasons
Category	Total	Year	Team leaders	Ref.
Points	2,767	2023-24	Calvin 607, Holden 522, Noel 451	
Assists	653	1985-86	Lyons 259, Jackson 93, Joye 86	
3-Pt Goals	285	2016-17	Benzinger 78, Alstork 70, Davis 52	
Rebounds	1,279	2019-20	Love 261, Holden 207, Wampler 140	
Blocks	152	2025-26	Pickett 46, Holden 42, Imariagbe 28	
Steals	323	1992-93	Woods 109, Edwards 59, Holderman 39	

== Postseason ==
=== NCAA Division I Tournament history ===
Wright State has made five appearances in the NCAA Division I men's basketball tournament, with the Raiders going 1–5.

Year	Seed	Round	Opponent	Result
1993	No. 16	First round	No. 1 Indiana	L 54–97
2007	No. 14	First round	No. 3 Pittsburgh	L 58–79
2018	No. 14	First round	No. 3 Tennessee	L 47–73
2022	No. 16	First Four; First round	No. 16 Bryant; No. 1 Arizona	W 93–82; L 70–87
2026	No. 14	First round	No. 3 Virginia	L 73–82

=== NCAA Division II tournament results ===
The Raiders have appeared in the NCAA Division II tournament eight times. Their combined record is 12–8. They were the 1983 National Champions.

Year	Round	Opponent	Result
1976	Regional semifinals Regional Finals	Evansville; Saint Joseph's (IN)	L 75–85; W 72–68
1979	Regional semifinals Regional Finals	Northern Michigan; Saint Joseph's (IN)	L 66–75; L 68–73
1980	Regional semifinals Regional 3rd-place game	Eastern Illinois; Southern Indiana	L 63–74; W 88–85
1981	Regional semifinals Regional 3rd-place game	Northern Michigan; Southern Indiana	L 69–70; W 96–89
1982	Regional semifinals Regional 3rd-place game	Kentucky Wesleyan; Bellarmine	L 71–76 ^{OT} W 87–86
1983	Regional semifinals Regional Finals; Elite Eight; Final Four; National Championship	Lewis; Kentucky Wesleyan; Bloomsburg; Cal State Bakersfield; District of Columbia	W 71–57; W 69–67; W 73–53; W 57–50; W 92–73
1985	Regional semifinals Regional Finals	Lewis; Kentucky Wesleyan	W 61–53; L 72–84
1986	Regional semifinals Regional Finals; Elite Eight	Kentucky Wesleyan; SIU Edwardsville; Cheyney	W 94–84; W 77–73; L 75–78

=== NIT results ===
The Raiders have appeared in the National Invitation Tournament (NIT) one time. Their record is 0–1.

Year	Seed	Round	Opponent	Result
2019	No. 7	First round	No. 2 Clemson	L 69–75

=== CBI results ===
The Raiders have appeared in one College Basketball Invitational (CBI). Their record is 2–1.

Year	Round	Opponent	Result
2013	First round Quarterfinals; Semifinals	Tulsa; Richmond; Santa Clara	W 72–52; W 57–51; L 69–81

=== CIT results ===
The Raiders have appeared in one CollegeInsider.com Postseason tournament (CIT). Their record is 1–1.

Year	Round	Opponent	Result
2014	First round Second Round	East Carolina; Ohio	W 73–59; L 54–56

== National championships ==
Wright State has won one national championship (Division II).

Year	Coach	Opponent	Result	Record
1983	Ralph Underhill	District of Columbia	92–73	28–4

1982 NCAA DII Tournament Results
Round	Opponent	Score
Regional semifinals	Lewis	71–57
Regional Finals	Kentucky Wesleyan	69–67
Quarterfinals	Bloomsburg State	73–53
Final Four	Cal State Bakersfield	57–50
Championship	District of Columbia	92–73

== Conference championships ==
=== Tournament championships ===
Wright State has five conference tournament championships, most recently in 2026 under coach Clint Sargent. The first championship came in the 1992–93 season under Ralph Underhill. The Raiders have appeared in 9 Horizon League/Midwestern Collegiate championship games, most recently was in 2026. Wright State's first and only appearance in the Mid-Continent Conference championship game resulted in a 94–88 victory over UIC.

Season	Coach	Conference	Opponent	Score	Overall Record	Conference Record
1992–93	Ralph Underhill	Mid-Continent Conference	UIC	94–88	20–10	10–6
2006–07	Brad Brownell	Horizon League	Butler	60–55	23–10	13–3
2017–18	Scott Nagy	Horizon League	Cleveland State	74–57	25–9	14–4
2021–22	Scott Nagy	Horizon League	Northern Kentucky	72–71	22–14	15–7
2025–26	Clint Sargent	Horizon League	Detroit Mercy	66–63	23–11	15–5

=== Regular season championships ===
Season	Coach	Overall Record	Conference Record
2006–07	Brad Brownell	23–10	13–3
2018–19	Scott Nagy	21–14	13–5
2019–20	Scott Nagy	25–7	15–3
2020–21	Scott Nagy	18–6	16–4
2025–26	Clint Sargent	20–11	15–5

== Awards ==
=== AP All-Americans ===
- DaShaun Wood* – 2007

(*) Denotes Honorable Mention

=== Division II All-Americans ===
- Bob Grote – 1976
- Rodney Benson – 1981
- Roman Welch – 1981
- Gary Monroe – 1983
- Fred Moore – 1984
- Andy Warner – 1985
- Grant Marion – 1986
- Mark Vest – 1986

=== Mid-Continent Conference Player of the Year ===
- Bill Edwards – 1993

=== Horizon League Player of the Year ===
- DaShaun Wood – 2007
- Loudon Love – 2020, 2021

=== Horizon League Coach of the Year ===
- Paul Biancardi – 2004
- Brad Brownell (co) – 2008
- Billy Donlon – 2013
- Scott Nagy – 2018, 2019, 2020
- Clint Sargent – 2026

=== First-Team All-Mid-Continent Conference ===
- Bill Edwards (1992, 1993)
- Mark Woods (1993)
- Mike Nahar (1994)

=== First-Team Horizon League ===
- Vitaly Potapenko (1995, 1996)
- Keion Brooks (1997, 1999)
- Kevin Melson (2000, 2001)
- Israel Sheinfeld (2000)
- Seth Doliboa (2003, 2004)
- DaShaun Wood (2006, 2007)
- Vaughn Duggins (2008, 2011)
- Mark Alstork (2017)
- Grant Benzinger (2018)
- Loudon Love (2019, 2020, 2021)
- Tanner Holden (2021, 2022)
- Trey Calvin (2023)
- TJ Burch (2026)

== Raiders in the NBA ==
Two Wright State alumni have gone on to play in the NBA. They are:

- Bill Edwards – played for the Philadelphia 76ers in 1994
- Vitaly Potapenko – drafted 12th overall by the Cleveland Cavaliers in the 1996 NBA draft, played for 11 seasons

== Raiders in NBA G League ==
- Loudon Love – Played three seasons in the G League. He played for the Texas Legends in 2021, and later the Memphis Hustle, Cleveland Charge, Mexico City Capitanes, and Raptors.

== Raiders in international leagues ==
- Israel Sheinfeld (born 1976) – Israeli basketball player who played in the Israel Basketball Premier League and on the Israeli national basketball team.
- DaShaun Wood (Germany, France), Vaughn Duggins (France), N’Gai Evans (Macedonia), Cooper Land (Norway), Jesse Deister (Germany), Mike Nahar (Holland), Vernard Hollins (France), Todd Brown (Austria), Cory Cooperwood (Finland), Scottie Wilson (Latvia), Zach Williams (France), Thad Burton (France), Delme Herriman (England), Inus Norville (Cyprus), Cain Doliboa (France), Bruno Petersons (Latvia), Seth Doliboa (Developmental League), Matt Vest(Germany), Cole Darling (Sweden), AJ Pacher (Italy), Michael Karena (Spain).
