= Gem City Jam =

American college basketball rivalry

- Dayton Flyers Wright State Raiders
- First meeting: March 5, 1988; University of Dayton, 89–71
- Latest meeting: December 13, 1997; University of Dayton, 94–63
- Next meeting: TBD
- Trophy: Gem City Jam Trophy

Statistics
- Total meetings: 8
- All-time series: Dayton leads, 5–3
- Largest victory: Dayton, 94–63 (1997)
- Longest win streak: Dayton, 3 (1995–1997)
- Current win streak: Dayton, 3 (1995–1997)

Locations of UD and Wright State

The Gem City Jam is a college basketball rivalry between the University of Dayton Flyers and the Wright State University Raiders.

The class-driven cross-town rivalry began in 1988, playing over the years to large raucous crowds packing both school's 10,000 seat arenas. UD has declined to renew the contest each year since the 97-98 season.

== Series origins ==
Few fan bases in the country rival Dayton's for ticket sales.

Wright State basketball is a much younger program, playing its first basketball in the 1970s. Wright State built a scrappy fan following at the Division II level with fast, aggressive teams and its 1983 National Championship.

The coaches and administrations for both schools enjoyed close relationships leading to UD making a verbal agreement to play the suburban school once they moved to Division I.

== Series suspension ==
Despite having a winning record in the series, UD has declined to renew the contest each year since the 1997–98 season. This change in posture resulted from new administration coming to power at UD that did not think as highly of the cross-town institution. Without an official reason for the suspension in the series, many theories have been offered in the press and around town. Due to the dramatic social gulf between the elite private school student body and the working class state school, a considerable amount of resentment has grown around this decision.

The Dayton Daily News and other local media have called annually for a renewal of the contest as a Dayton civic asset.

Wright State remains optimistic that the series will continue.

== Game results ==
| Dayton victories | Wright State victories | Tie games |

| No. | Date | Location | Winner | Score |
|---|---|---|---|---|
| 1 | March 5, 1988 | UD Arena | Dayton | 89–71 |
| 2 | January 6, 1990 | UD Arena | Wright State | 101–99 |
| 3 | December 11, 1993 | UD Arena | Dayton | 83–56 |
| 4 | January 8, 1994 | Nutter Center | Wright State | 77–65 |
| 5 | December 10, 1994 | Nutter Center | Wright State | 74–53 |

| No. | Date | Location | Winner | Score |
|---|---|---|---|---|
| 6 | December 9, 1995 | UD Arena | Dayton | 98–80 |
| 7 | January 9, 1997 | Nutter Center | Dayton | 72–63 |
| 8 | December 13, 1997 | UD Arena | Dayton | 94–63 |
Series: Dayton leads 5–3
