= 1981–82 Wright State Raiders men's basketball team =

American college basketball season

1981–82 Wright State Raiders men's basketball

NCAA tournament, 3rd Place Great Lakes Regional
- Conference: Independent
- Record: 22-7
- Head coach: Ralph Underhill (4th season)
- Assistant coaches: Jim Brown; Bob Grote
- Home arena: WSU PE Building

The 1981–82 Wright State Raiders men's basketball team represented Wright State University in the 1981–82 NCAA NCAA Division II men's basketball season led by head coach Ralph Underhill.

== Season summary ==
Wright State began the 1981-82 season having graduated eight seniors the year before, including all five starters. However, they also began the season ranked #3 in the U.S. Basketball Writers Association preseason poll, so no opponent would overlook theses Raiders. Their dominate 22-7 final record could only be thought of as disappointing because of yet another 3rd place finish in the Great Lakes Regional of the NCAA Div-II tournament.

== Roster ==
1981–82 Wright State Raiders men's basketball team
Players
Coaches

Pos.	#	Name	Height	Weight	Year	Previous school	Hometown
C	33	Theron Barbour	6 ft 9 in (2.06 m)	204 lb (93 kg)	So	Atherton	Louisville, Kentucky
C	45	Phil Benninger	6 ft 8 in (2.03 m)	215 lb (98 kg)	RS Fr	New Albany	New Albany, Indiana
G/F	42	Anthony Bias	6 ft 4 in (1.93 m)	180 lb (82 kg)	Jr	Pulaski	Milwaukee, Wisconsin
G	43	Eric Ernst	6 ft 4 in (1.93 m)	200 lb (91 kg)	Fr	Middletown	Middletown, Ohio
F	30	Mike Grote	6 ft 1 in (1.85 m)	175 lb (79 kg)	So	Elder	Cincinnati, Ohio
F	25	Stan Hearns	6 ft 5 in (1.96 m)	185 lb (84 kg)	Jr	Ewing	Trenton, New Jersey
G/F	23	Tom Holzapfel	6 ft 5 in (1.96 m)	185 lb (84 kg)	Jr	Greenville	Greenville, Ohio
G	20	T.C. Johnson	6 ft 0 in (1.83 m)	170 lb (77 kg)	So	Sidney	Sidney, Ohio
G	34	Mark McCormick	6 ft 3 in (1.91 m)	160 lb (73 kg)	Fr	Fairmont East	Kettering, Ohio
G	52	Aaron McGlon,	6 ft 0 in (1.83 m)	155 lb (70 kg)	Jr	Eastside	Gainesville, Florida
C	24	Gary Monroe	6 ft 7 in (2.01 m)	190 lb (86 kg)	Jr	Roosevelt	Washington D.C.
F	40	Fred Moore	6 ft 7.5 in (2.02 m)	190 lb (86 kg)	So	Atherton	Louisville, Kentucky
G/F	35	Steve Purcell	6 ft 4 in (1.93 m)	180 lb (82 kg)	Fr	Kokomo	Kokomo, Indiana
F	44	Andy Warner	6 ft 5 in (1.96 m)	200 lb (91 kg)	Fr	Piqua	Piqua, Ohio

Head coach

- Ralph Underhill

Assistant coach(es)

Jim Brown, Bob Grote

Legend

- (C) Team captain
- (S) Suspended
- (I) Ineligible
- (W) Walk-on
- Injured
- Current redshirt

== Schedule and results ==
Date time, TV	Rank^{#}	Opponent^{#}	Result	Record	Site city, state
Regular season
Nov 28, 1981		Wilberforce	W 102-60	1-0	WSU PE Building; Fairborn, OH
Dec 2, 1981		at Bowling Green	W 81-71	2–0	Anderson Arena; Bowling Green, OH
Dec 5, 1981		Franklin	W 92-73	3-0	WSU PE Building; Fairborn, OH
Dec 7, 1981		at Miami Ohio	W 65-59	4–0	Millett Assembly Hall; Oxford, Ohio
Dec 13, 1981		at Charleston	L 69-83	4–1	Eddie King Gymnasium; Charleston, West Virginia
Dec 15, 1981		Thomas Moore	W 100-78	5–1	WSU PE Building; Fairborn, OH
Dec 18, 1981		Otterbein	W 86-83	6-1	WSU PE Building; Fairborn, OH
Dec 21, 1981		Charleston	W 68-55	7–1	WSU PE Building; Fairborn, OH
Jan 2, 1982		Northeastern Illinois	W 99-63	8–1	WSU PE Building; Fairborn, OH
Jan 4, 1982		Lewis	L 57-69	8–2	WSU PE Building; Fairborn, OH
Jan 6, 1982		at Indiana Central	W 77-61	9-2	Nicoson Hall; Indianapolis
Jan 9, 1982		Gannon	W 73-55	10-2	WSU PE Building; Fairborn, OH
Jan 14, 1982		vs. Central State	W 86-72	11-2	UD Arena; Dayton, Ohio
Jan 20, 1982		Northern Kentucky	W 57-55 ^{OT}	12-2	WSU PE Building; Fairborn, OH
Jan 23, 1982		Indiana-Purdue-Ft. Wayne	W 105-80	13-2	WSU PE Building; Fort Wayne, Indiana
Jan 25, 1982		IUPUI	W 96-87	14-2	WSU PE Building; Fairborn, OH
Jan 27, 1982		at St. Joseph’s (IN)	W 75-56	15-2	Roberts Municipal Stadium; Evansville, Indiana
Feb 1, 1982		Youngstown State	W 85-74	16-2	WSU PE Building; Fairborn, OH
Feb 4, 1982		at Kentucky State	W 97-89	17-2	Capital Plaza; Frankfort, Kentucky
Feb 6, 1982		Transylvania	W 74-60	18-2	WSU PE Building; Fairborn, OH
Feb 9, 1982		vs. Central State	L 73-94	18-3	UD Arena; Dayton, Ohio
Feb 11, 1982		at Lewis	L 74-76	18–4	Memorial Gym; Lockport, Illinois
Feb 17, 1982		Indiana Central	L 83-87	18-5	WSU PE Building; Fairborn, OH
Feb 20, 1982		Siena Heights	W 83-71	19-5	WSU PE Building; Fairborn, OH
Feb 24, 1982		at Transylvania	L 52-55	19-6	McAlister Auditorium; Lexington, Kentucky
Feb 27, 1982		at Northern Kentucky	W 69-67	20-6	Regents Hall; Highland Heights, Kentucky
Mar 2, 1982		Kentucky State	W 97-89	21-6	WSU PE Building; Fairborn, OH
NCAA tournament
Mar 6, 1982		at Kentucky Wesleyan; NCAA Division II Great Lakes Regional	L 71-76 ^{OT}	21-7	Owensboro Sportscenter; Owensboro, Kentucky
Mar 7, 1981		vs. Bellarmine; NCAA Division II Great Lakes Regional	W 87-86 ^{2OT}	22-7	Owensboro Sportscenter; Owensboro, Kentucky
*Non-conference game. ^{#}Rankings from AP Poll. (#) Tournament seedings in parentheses. MW=Midwest.

== Awards and honors ==
Stan Hearns	MVP
T.C. Johnson	Raider Award

== Statistics ==
Number	Name	Games	Average	Points	Assists	Rebounds
25	Stan Hearns	27	17.8	481	40	119
24	Gary Monroe	26	13.0	337	23	145
40	Fred Moore	27	9.8	265	25	101
35	Steve Purcell	27	8.4	253	34	139
42	Anthony Bias	27	7.9	214	135	120
20	T.C. Johnson	27	5.9	159	79	49
44	Andy Warner	22	5.5	120	8	50
30	Mike Grote	18	5.2	93	72	30
23	Tom Holzapfel	24	4.7	113	23	50
33	Theron Barbour	21	3.3	68	8	49
34	Mark McCormick	14	2.3	32	13	16
32	Aaron McGlen	12	1.7	20	4	8
43	Eric Ernst	8	1.5	12	1	8
