= 1983–84 Wright State Raiders men's basketball team =

American college basketball season

1983–84 Wright State Raiders men's basketball
- Conference: Independent
- Record: 19-9
- Head coach: Ralph Underhill (6th season)
- Assistant coaches: Jim Brown; Bob Grote; John Ross
- Home arena: WSU PE Building

The 1983–84 Wright State Raiders men's basketball team represented Wright State University in the 1983–84 NCAA NCAA Division II men's basketball season led by head coach Ralph Underhill.

== Season summary ==
The 1983–84 Wright State Raiders team won 19 matches and lost 9.

== Roster ==
1983–84 Wright State Raiders men's basketball team
Players
Coaches

Pos.	#	Name	Height	Weight	Year	Previous school	Hometown
G	22	Eric Ellis	6 ft 1 in (1.85 m)	158 lb (72 kg)	Sr	Forest Park	Cincinnati, Ohio
F	30	Mike Grote	6 ft 1 in (1.85 m)	175 lb (79 kg)	Sr	Elder	Cincinnati, Ohio
G	20	T.C. Johnson	6 ft 0 in (1.83 m)	170 lb (77 kg)	Sr	Sidney	Sidney, Ohio
F	40	Fred Moore	6 ft 8 in (2.03 m)	190 lb (86 kg)	Sr	Atherton	Louisville, Kentucky
G/F	35	Steve Purcell	6 ft 4 in (1.93 m)	180 lb (82 kg)	Sr	Kokomo	Kokomo, Indiana
C	33	Theron Barbour	6 ft 9 in (2.06 m)	220 lb (100 kg)	Jr	Atherton	Louisville, Kentucky
C	45	Phil Benninger	6 ft 8 in (2.03 m)	215 lb (98 kg)	Jr	New Albany	New Albany, Indiana
G	43	Eric Ernst	6 ft 4 in (1.93 m)	200 lb (91 kg)	Jr	Middletown	Middletown, Ohio
F	32	Rob Sanders	6 ft 6 in (1.98 m)	185 lb (84 kg)	So	Olentangy	Columbus, Ohio
G/F	23	Mark Vest	6 ft 6 in (1.98 m)	185 lb (84 kg)	So	Carroll	Beavercreek, Ohio
F	44	Andy Warner	6 ft 5 in (1.96 m)	200 lb (91 kg)	So	Piqua	Piqua, Ohio
C	42	Gerald Clay	6 ft 8 in (2.03 m)	200 lb (91 kg)	Fr	Portsmouth	Portsmouth, Ohio
F	24	Rodney Webb	6 ft 8 in (2.03 m)	195 lb (88 kg)	Fr	Morrow	Morrow, Georgia

Head coach

- Ralph Underhill

Assistant coach(es)

Jim Brown, Bob Grote, John Ross

Legend

- (C) Team captain
- (S) Suspended
- (I) Ineligible
- (W) Walk-on
- Injured
- Current redshirt

== Schedule and results ==
Date time, TV	Rank^{#}	Opponent^{#}	Result	Record	Site city, state
Regular season
Nov 26, 1983		Davis and Elkins	W 71-55	1-0	WSU PE Building; Fairborn, OH
Dec 3, 1983		Edinboro	W 50-42	2-0	WSU PE Building; Fairborn, OH
Dec 7, 1983		Indiana Central	W 83-71	3-0	WSU PE Building; Fairborn, OH
Dec 10, 1983		Thomas Moore	W 97-75	4–0	WSU PE Building; Fairborn, OH
Dec 14, 1983		Chapman	W 106-83	5–0	WSU PE Building; Fairborn, OH
Dec 17, 1983		Heidelberg	L 70-74	5–1	WSU PE Building; Fairborn, OH
Dec 21, 1983		at Bellarmine	L 70-82	5-2	Owensboro Sportscenter; Owensboro, Kentucky
Jan 3, 1984		at Indiana-Purdue-Ft. Wayne	L 53-61	5-3	IPFW Gymnasium; Fort Wayne, Indiana
Jan 6, 1984		Northeastern Illinois; Wright State Invitational	W 70-59	6–3	WSU PE Building; Fairborn, OH
Jan 7, 1984		Cheyney; Wright State Invitational	L 73-79	6-4	WSU PE Building; Fairborn, OH
Jan 11, 1984		IUPUI	W 94-72	7-4	WSU PE Building; Fairborn, OH
Jan 14, 1984		Illinois Tech	W 106-67	8-4	WSU PE Building; Fairborn, OH
Jan 18, 1984		vs. Central State	W 68-67	9-4	UD Arena; Dayton, Ohio
Jan 21, 1974		Ashland	W 72-65	10-4	WSU PE Building; Fairborn, OH
Jan 25, 1984		at Indiana Central	W 65-55	11-4	Nicoson Hall; Indianapolis
Jan 27, 1974		Marycrest	W 110-85	12-4	WSU PE Building; Fairborn, OH
Jan 31, 19824		at ISU-Evansville	W 70-56	13–4	HPER Building; Evansville, Indiana
Feb 1, 1984		at Kentucky Wesleyan	L 69-81	13-5	Owensboro Sportscenter; Owensboro, Kentucky
Feb 8, 1984		at District of Columbia	L 84-89	13-6	Physical Activities Center; Washington D.C.
Feb 11, 1984		Spring Arbor	W 78-75	14-6	WSU PE Building; Fairborn, OH
Feb 13, 1984		Kentucky Wesleyan	L 66-69	14-7	WSU PE Building; Fairborn, OH
Feb 18, 1974		Ashland	W 69-60 ^{2OT}	15-7	Kates Gym; Ashland, OH
Feb 20, 1984		at Louisville	L 69-90	15–8	Freedom Hall; Louisville, Kentucky
Feb 23, 1984		Bellarmine	W 71-59	16-8	WSU PE Building; Fairborn, OH
Feb 25, 1984		Michigan-Dearborn	W 116-101	17-8	WSU PE Building; Fairborn, OH
Feb 28, 1984		at St. Francis (IL)	W 90-72	18-8	Joliet Armory; Joliet, Illinois
Feb 29, 1984		Illinois Tech	W 100-64	19-8	Keating Hall; Chicago, Illinois
Feb 8, 1984		District of Columbia	L 66-68	19-9	WSU PE Building; Fairborn, OH
*Non-conference game. ^{#}Rankings from AP Poll. (#) Tournament seedings in parentheses. MW=Midwest.

== Awards and honors ==
Fred Moore	MVP
Fred Moore	All American
Steve Purcell	Raider Award

== Statistics ==
Number	Name	Games	Average	Points	Assists	Rebounds
40	Fred Moore	28	19.5	547	52	209
23	Mark Vest	28	18.2	509	57	101
35	Steve Purcell	28	11.2	313	70	209
44	Andy Warner	27	10.0	269	23	90
20	T.C. Johnson	13	5.9	77	44	30
33	Thernon Barbour	28	5.4	150	17	91
30	Mike Grote	19	4.3	81	100	35
22	Eric Ellis	27	3.6	97	52	29
32	Rob Sanders	20	2.9	58	15	41
24	Rodney Webb	17	2.5	43	5	32
43	Eric Ernst	15	1.9	29	1	2
45	Phil Benninger	7	1.7	12	1	12
42	Gerald Clay	16	1.3	21	2	29
