= 1983 NAIA women's basketball tournament =

- Teams: 8
- Finals site: , Kansas City, Missouri
- Champions: SW Oklahoma State (2nd title, 2nd title game, 2nd Fab Four)
- Runner-up: Alabama–Huntsville (1st title game, 1st Fab Four)
- Semifinalists: UMKC (1st Fab Four); Portland (1st Fab Four)
- Coach of the year: John Loftin (SW Oklahoma State)
- Charles Stevenson Hustle Award: Sarina Toney (Alabama–Huntsville)
- Chuck Taylor MVP: Kelli Litsch (SW Oklahoma State)
- Top scorer: Kelli Litsch (SW Oklahoma State) (78 points)

The 1983 NAIA women's basketball tournament was the third annual tournament held by the NAIA to determine the national champion of women's college basketball among its members in the United States and Canada.

Defending champions Southwestern Oklahoma State defeated Alabama–Huntsville in the championship game, 80–68, to claim the Bulldogs' second NAIA national title.

The tournament was played in Kansas City, Missouri.

== Qualification ==
The tournament field was again set at eight teams. All teams were seeded.

The tournament utilized a simple single-elimination format, with an additional third-place game for the losers of the two semifinals.

Qualified Teams
School	Appearance	Last Bid
Alabama–Huntsville	1st	Never
Campbellsville	1st	Never
UMKC	1st	Never
Nazareth (NY)	1st	Never
Portland	1st	Never
Saginaw Valley State	3rd	1982
Southwestern Oklahoma State	2nd	1982
Wayland Baptist	1st	Never

== Bracket ==
Quarterfinals
1	SW Oklahoma State	69
8	Nazareth (NY)	38
5	Saginaw Valley	67
4	UMKC	74
3	Campbellsville	66
6	Alabama–Huntsville	76
7	Wayland Baptist	60
2	Portland	65

Semifinals
1	SW Oklahoma State	81
4	UMKC	69
6	Alabama–Huntsville	73
2	Portland	67

National championship
1	SW Oklahoma State	80
6	Alabama–Huntsville	68
National third place
4	UMKC	85
2	Portland	65

== See also ==
- 1983 NCAA Division I women's basketball tournament
- 1983 NCAA Division II women's basketball tournament
- 1983 NCAA Division III women's basketball tournament
- 1983 NAIA men's basketball tournament
