= 1998–99 Wright State Raiders men's basketball team =

American college basketball season

1998–99 Wright State Raiders men's basketball
- Conference: MCC
- Record: 9–18 (4–10 MCC)
- Head coach: Ed Schilling (2nd season)
- Assistant coaches: Will Rey; Rod Foster; Ken Barer
- Home arena: Nutter Center

1998–99 Midwestern Collegiate Conference men's basketball standings
	Conf.				Overall
Team	W		L	PCT	W		L	PCT
Detroit †	12	–	2	.857	25	–	6	.806
Butler	11	–	3	.786	22	–	10	.688
Green Bay	9	–	5	.643	20	–	11	.645
Loyola Chicago	7	–	7	.500	9	–	18	.333
Cleveland State	6	–	8	.429	14	–	14	.500
Milwaukee	5	–	9	.357	8	–	19	.296
Wright State	4	–	10	.286	9	–	18	.333
UIC	2	–	12	.143	7	–	21	.250
† 1999 MCC tournament winner

The 1998–99 Wright State Raiders men's basketball team represented Wright State University in the 1998–99 NCAA Division I men's basketball season led by head coach Ed Schilling.

== Season summary ==
Seniors Keion Brooks and Sherman Curry returned two of the top three scorers from the previous season to anchor the squad and newcomers Kevin Melson, Marcus May and Israel Sheinfeld provided some excitement to thrill the home fans.

However, by the time the season ended with what had begun to feel like the annual elimination loss to Butler, playing away from the friendly Nutter Center had become synonymous with losing.

The honeymoon was over for Coach Schilling, as supporters and media had begun to voice skepticism. After the season, he again took an aggressive stance towards his own roster promising “merciless” conditioning saying “... if they don’t want to do it, I don’t want them,” which further fanned speculation as to what the internal culture must be like between coach and team.

=== Roster changes ===
==== Joining ====
- Kevin Melson (F) transferred in from Schoolcraft Junior College
- Israel Sheinfeld (F) signed following his military commitment in Israel
- Marcus May (G) recruited from Indianapolis North Central High, where he played alongside two All-Americans.
- Louis Holmes (G) from Orange Christian Academy where he shot 60% from the field

==== Leaving ====
- Brandon Pardon (PG) transferred to Bowling Green State University. While "spiritual differences" made the headlines, there was also apparently some disagreement about the strict team rules.

== Roster ==
1998–99 Wright State Raiders men's basketball team
Players
Coaches

Pos.	#	Name	Height	Weight	Year	Previous school	Hometown
G	21	Keion Brooks	6 ft 3 in (1.91 m)	173 lb (78 kg)	Sr	North Side	Ft. Wayne, IN
F	30	Sherman Curry	6 ft 5 in (1.96 m)	171 lb (78 kg)	Sr	Wallace CC	McWilliams, AL
F	50	Inus Norville	6 ft 9 in (2.06 m)	271 lb (123 kg)	RS Sr	Hargrave Military	Rocky Mount, NC
G	25	Steve Yeagle	6 ft 4 in (1.93 m)	172 lb (78 kg)	Jr	Minford	Minford, OH
F	3	Onome Scott-Emuakpor	6 ft 7 in (2.01 m)	206 lb (93 kg)	So	East Lansing	East Lansing, MI
F	3	Kevin Melson	6 ft 6 in (1.98 m)	195 lb (88 kg)	RS So	Schoolcraft CC	Detroit, MI
F	45	Ryan Grose	6 ft 6 in (1.98 m)	235 lb (107 kg)	So	Norwalk	Norwalk, OH
C	52	Bruno Petersons	7 ft 0 in (2.13 m)	244 lb (111 kg)	Fr	Wheaton Academy	West Chicago, IL
F	10	Israel Sheinfeld	6 ft 10 in (2.08 m)	250 lb (113 kg)	Fr	Tel Aviv, Israel
F	20	Marcus May	5 ft 10 in (1.78 m)	170 lb (77 kg)	Fr	North Central	Indianapolis
F	24	Louis Holmes	6 ft 4 in (1.93 m)	180 lb (82 kg)	Fr	Orange Christian	Cleveland, OH

Head coach

- Ed Schilling

Assistant coach(es)

Will Rey, Rod Foster, Ken Barer

Legend

- (C) Team captain
- (S) Suspended
- (I) Ineligible
- (W) Walk-on
- Injured
- Current redshirt

== Schedule and results ==
Date time, TV	Rank^{#}	Opponent^{#}	Result	Record	Site city, state
Nov 14, 1998*		at Old Dominion	L 60-81	0–1	Norfolk Scope; Norfolk, VA
Nov 17, 1998*		Central Michigan	W 81-80 ^{ot}	0–2	Nutter Center; Fairborn, OH
Nov 20, 1998*		Pittsburgh	L 65-76	0–3	Nutter Center; Fairborn, OH
Nov 23, 1998*		vs. No. 8 Kentucky	L 75–97	0–4	The Crown; Cincinnati, OH
Nov 28, 1998*		Sacred Heart	W 77–50	1–4	Nutter Center; Fairborn, OH
Dec 5, 1998*		Denver	W 79–57	2–4	Nutter Center; Fairborn, OH
Dec 8, 1998*		at Ball State	L 70-84	2–5	University Arena; Muncie, IN
Dec 12, 1998*		at Denver	L 76–98	2–6	Fieldhouse; Denver, CO
Dec 14, 1998*		at Northern Iowa	L 70-78	2–7	UNI-Dome; Cedar Falls, IA
Dec 19, 1998*		Morehead State	W 64–58	3–7	Nutter Center; Fairborn, OH
Dec 21, 1998*		Prairie View A&M	W 94–62	4–7	Nutter Center; Fairborn, OH
Dec 28, 1998*		Chicago State	W 75-56	5–7	Nutter Center; Fairborn, Ohio
Jan 4, 1999		at UIC	W 100-74	6-7 (1–0)	UIC Pavilion; Chicago, IL
Jan 5, 1999		at Loyola	L 67-80	6-8 (1–1)	Gentile Event Center; Chicago, IL
Jan 9, 1999		Butler	L 53-74	6–9 (1–2)	Nutter Center; Fairborn, OH
Jan 16, 1999		Cleveland State	W 89-74	7-9 (2–2)	Nutter Center; Fairborn, OH
Feb 19, 1999		Detroit Mercy	L 56–68	7-10 (2–3)	Nutter Center; Fairborn, OH
Jan 21, 1999		at Milwaukee	L 65-69	7-11 (2–4)	Klotsche Center; Milwaukee, WI
Jan 23, 1999		at Green Bay	L 52-54	7-12 (2–5)	Brown County Veterans Memorial Arena; Green Bay, WI
Jan 28, 1999		Loyola	L 68-75	7-13 (2–6)	Nutter Center; Fairborn, OH
Jan 30, 1999		UIC	W 68-61	8-13 (3–6)	Nutter Center; Fairborn, OH
Feb 6, 1999		at Butler	L 78-88 ^{2OT}	8-14 (3–7)	Hinkle Fieldhouse; Indianapolis
Feb 11, 1999		at Detroit Mercy	L 46–64	8-15 (3–8)	Calihan Hall; Detroit, MI
Feb 13, 1999		at Cleveland State	L 64-87	8-16 (3–9)	CSU Convocation Center; Cleveland, OH
Feb 18, 1999		Green Bay	L 40-58	8-17 (3–10)	Nutter Center; Fairborn, OH
Feb 20, 1999		Milwaukee	W 71-69	9-17 (4–10)	Nutter Center; Fairborn, OH
Midwestern Collegiate Tournament
Feb 28, 1999	(7)	vs. (2) Butler; Quarterfinals	L 56-64	9-18	UIC Pavilion; Chicago, IL
*Non-conference game. ^{#}Rankings from AP Poll. (#) Tournament seedings in parentheses. MW=Midwest.

== Awards and honors ==
Bruno Petersons	Raider Award
Keion Brooks	First Team All League
Kevin Melson	Second Team All League
Kevin Melson	Newcomer of the Year
Kevin Melson	All-Newcomer Team
Marcus May	All-Newcomer Team

== Statistics ==
Number	Name	Games	Average	Points	Assists	Rebounds
21	Keion Brooks	27	20.7	559	107	151
22	Kevin Melson	27	14.6	395	40	182
20	Marcus May	27	9.4	255	110	105
50	Inus Norville	25	9.0	224	11	126
30	Sherman Curry	25	5.3	133	26	90
10	Israel Sheinfeld	27	4.0	109	10	94
3	Onome Scott-Emuakpor	23	2.7	61	6	62
24	Louis Holmes	17	2.5	43	0	8
25	Steve Yeagle	24	1.7	41	0	17
52	Bruno Petersons	27	1.2	33	15	72
21	Ryan Grose	10	0.6	6	0	14
