= 1983 NAIA men's basketball tournament =

46th annual NAIA basketball tournament

- Teams: 32
- Finals site: Kemper Arena, Kansas City, Missouri
- Champions: College of Charleston (1 title, 1 title game, 1 Fab Four)
- Runner-up: West Virginia Wesleyan (1 title game, 1 Fab Four)
- Semifinalists: Fort Hays State (3 Final Four); Chaminade (1 Final Four)
- Charles Stevenson Hustle Award: Raymond Lee (Fort Hays State)
- Chuck Taylor MVP: Steve Yetman (Charleston)

The 1983 NAIA men's basketball tournament was held in March at Kemper Arena in Kansas City, Missouri. The 46th annual NAIA basketball tournament featured 32 teams playing in a single-elimination format. College of Charleston emerged as champions.

== Awards and honors ==
- Leading scorers:
- Leading rebounder:
- Player of the Year: est. 1994.

== Bracket ==
First round	Second round
1	Chaminade	90
Alabama Huntsville	72
1	Chaminade	82
16	Saginaw Valley State	65
16	Saginaw Valley State	65
Lincoln (PA)	59
TOP TIER
9	Wisconsin–Stevens Point	77
Point Loma	50
9	Wisconsin Stevens Point	62
Liberty Baptist	64
Liberty Baptist	77
8	Catawba	67
5	Panhandle State	68*
North Georgia	67
5	Panhandle State	62
12	College of Charleston	64*
St. John's (MN)	43
12	College of Charleston	67
TOP TIER
13	Texas Wesleyan	72
Point Park	55
13	Texas Wesleyan	65
Santa Fe	71
Santa Fe	76
4	Cumberland (KY)	65
3	Chicago State	76
Tri-State	65
3	Chicago State	70
14	West Virginia Wesleyan	87
Husson	49
14	West Virginia Wesleyan	65
BOTTOM TIER
11	Carson-Newman	114
Northern State (SD)	81
11	Carson-Newman	75
6	St. Mary's (TX)	70
Kearney State	71
6	St. Mary's (TX)	81
7	St. Thomas Aquinas	56
Drury	45
7	St. Thomas Aquinas	67
10	Fort Hays State	72
Southern Arkansas	65
10	Fort Hays State	71
BOTTOM TIER
15	Loras	85
William Carey	78
15	Loras	67
Salem	65
Salem (WV)	65
2	Walsh	63

Elite Eight
1	Chaminade	63
Liberty Baptist	60
12	College of Charleston	67
Santa Fe	62
14	West Virginia Wesleyan	86
11	Carson Newman	78
10	Fort Hays State	74
15	Loras	71

NAIA national semifinals
1	Chaminade	65
12	College of Charleston	66
14	West Virginia Wesleyan	71
10	Fort Hays State	56

NAIA national championship
12	College of Charleston	57
14	West Virginia Wesleyan	53
NAIA third-place game
1	Chaminade	76
10	Fort Hays State	85

- * denotes overtime.

== See also ==
- 1983 NCAA Division I men's basketball tournament
- 1983 NCAA Division II men's basketball tournament
- 1983 NCAA Division III men's basketball tournament
- 1983 NAIA women's basketball tournament
