= 1983 NCAA Division III women's basketball tournament =

- Teams: 32
- Finals site: , Worcester, Massachusetts
- Champions: North Central Cardinals (1st title)
- Runner-up: Elizabethtown Blue Jays (2nd title game)
- Third place: Knoxville Bulldogs (1st Final Four)
- Fourth place: Clark Cougars (2nd Final Four)
- Winning coach: Wayne Morgan (1st title)
- MOP: Page Lutz (Elizabethtown)

The 1983 NCAA Division III women's basketball tournament was the second annual tournament hosted by the NCAA to determine the national champion of Division III women's collegiate basketball in the United States.

North Central (IL) defeated defending champions Elizabethtown in the championship game, 83–71, to claim the Cardinals' first Division III national title.

The championship rounds were hosted at Clark University in Worcester, Massachusetts.

The field for the tournament doubled in size from the previous championship in 1982, increasing from 16 to 32 teams.

== Bracket ==
=== First round ===
- Clark (MA) 85, Bridgewater St. 71
- Salem St. 59, Eastern Conn. St. 58
- Rhode Island Col. 64, Hartwick 63
- New Rochelle 80, St. Lawrence 74
- Frostburg St. 72, TCNJ 68
- Kean 68, Wooster 63
- Elizabethtown 65, Scranton 47
- Grove City 60, Susquehanna 58
- Central (IA) 78, Augustana (IL) 71
- North Central (IL) 78, Buena Vista 65
- Concordia-M’head 75, Pomona-Pitzer 60
- Minn.-Morris 89, Bishop 78
- Wis.-Whitewater 96, Simpson 70
- Wis.-La Crosse 79, St. Norbert 65
- Pitt.-Johnstown 76, Rust 70
- Knoxville 74, UNC Greensboro 71

=== Regional finals ===
- Clark (MA) 62, Salem St. 57
- New Rochelle 75, Rhode Island Col. 58
- Kean 79, Frostburg St. 74
- Elizabethtown 59, Grove City 55
- North Central (IL) 82, Central (IA) 79
- Minn.-Morris 69, Concordia-M’head 68
- Wis.-La Crosse 78, Wis.-Whitewater 66
- Knoxville 73, Pitt.-Johnstown 71

=== National finals ===
Elite Eight
Clark (MA)	67
New Rochelle	58
Elizabethtown	62
Kean	57
North Central (IL)	100
Minnesota–Morris	82
Knoxville	70
Wisconsin–La Crosse

Final Four
Clark (MA)	66
Elizabethtown	80
North Central (IL)	84
Knoxville	74

National championship
Elizabethtown	71
North Central (IL)	83
Third place
Clark (MA)	80
Knoxville	82

== All-tournament team ==
- Page Lutz, Elizabethtown (MOP)
- Kim Wallner, North Central (IL)
- Brenda Sanders, North Central (IL)
- Judy Hodge, Clark (MA)
- Jackie Moore, Knoxville

== See also ==
- 1983 NCAA Division III men's basketball tournament
- 1983 NCAA Division I women's basketball tournament
- 1983 NCAA Division II women's basketball tournament
- 1983 NAIA women's basketball tournament
