= Ed Schilling =

American basketball player and coach

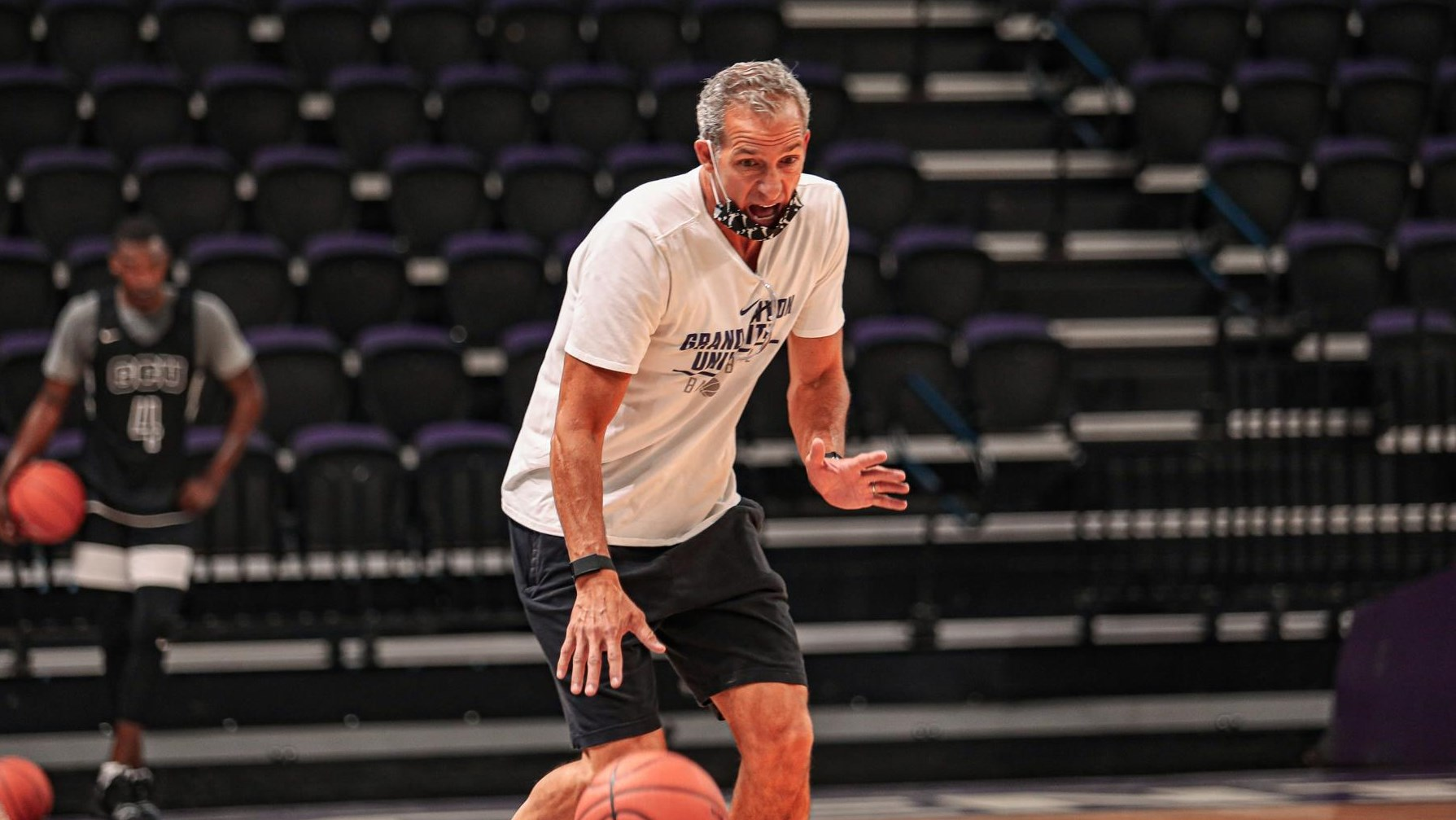
- Schilling with Grand Canyon in 2020

Personal information
- Born: January 4, 1966 (age 60)

Career information
- High school: Lebanon Senior (Lebanon, Indiana)
- College: Miami (Ohio) (1984–1988)
- NBA draft: 1988: undrafted
- Position: Point guard
- Coaching career: 1989–present

Career history

Coaching
- 1988–1991: Western Boone
- 1991–1995: Logansport
- 1995–1996: UMass (assistant)
- 1996–1997: New Jersey Nets (assistant)
- 1997–2003: Wright State
- 2003–2005: Memphis (assistant)
- 2009–2013: Park Tudor
- 2013–2017: UCLA (assistant)
- 2017–2019: Indiana (assistant)
- 2020–2024: Grand Canyon (assistant)
- 2024–2026: Pepperdine

Edmund C. Schilling Jr. (born January 4, 1966) is an American college basketball coach and former player who is the former head coach at Pepperdine University. Previously he served as the head coach of the Wright State Raiders.

== College career ==
Schilling was a starting point guard at Miami (Ohio) for four years from 1984 to 1988. He holds the program's career assists record with 629. His teams made appearances in the NCAA Division I men's basketball tournament twice.

== Coaching career ==
=== High school ===
At age 22, Schilling began his coaching career in the high school ranks and has held three head coaching positions in high school. He was the head coach at Western Boone Junior-Senior High School from 1988 to 1991. The team had won one game the season before his arrival, and he posted records of 5–16, 11-10 and 15–7 in his three seasons. He moved to Logansport High School for 1991–95.

He coached the United States for the McDonald's All-American Game in 1991 and was its youngest ever head coach.

Following stints in the NBA and as a college assistant and head coach, Schilling returned to high school coaching from 2009 to 2013 at Park Tudor School, winning back-to-back IHSAA State Championships in 2011 and 2012, coaching future professionals Kevin "Yogi" Ferrell and Trevon Bluiett.

=== College Assistant ===
Schilling has spent 10 seasons on the bench of Division 1 programs including UMass, Wright State, Memphis, UCLA, Indiana and Grand Canyon. Schilling worked under John Calipari at UMass.

=== New Jersey Nets ===
Schilling was the first assistant coach hire on the staff of new New Jersey Nets head coach John Calipari for the 1996–97 season. At 30 years old, he was the youngest coach in the NBA and one of the youngest people in the Nets' locker room.

=== Wright State ===
Schilling was hired to lead the Wright State program on March 19, 1997, taking over for Ralph Underhill. He was the head coach for six seasons and went 75–93 in his six seasons. He was dismissed in 2003 with three years remaining on his contract.

=== Grand Canyon ===
Newly hired Grand Canyon head coach Bryce Drew added Schilling to his staff on April 1, 2020. In the staff's first season, the program won its first conference title at the Division 1 level and qualified for its first NCAA Tournament.

=== Pepperdine ===
On March 4, 2024, Schilling was hired as the head coach of the Pepperdine Waves. On March 9, 2026, Schilling was fired after two losing seasons.

== Personal life ==
Schilling's father, Ed Sr., played college basketball at Butler and was inducted into the school's hall of fame in 2002. Schilling's wife, April, was a former assistant coach for the Indiana Fever.

== Head coaching record ==
Record table
Season	Team	Overall	Conference	Standing	Postseason
Wright State Raiders (Midwestern Collegiate Conference) (1997–2001)
1997–98	Wright State	10–18	3–11	7th	
1998–99	Wright State	9–18	4–10	7th	
1999–2000	Wright State	11–17	6–8	T–4th	
2000–01	Wright State	18–11	8–6	4th	
Wright State Raiders (Horizon League) (2001–2003)
2001–02	Wright State	17–11	8–6	T–4th	
2002–03	Wright State	10–18	4–12	T–6th	
Wright State:		75–93 (.446)	33–53 (.384)		
Pepperdine Waves (West Coast Conference) (2024–2026)
2024–25	Pepperdine	13–22	4–14	T–9th	
2025–26	Pepperdine	9–23	4–14	12th	
Pepperdine:		22–45 (.328)	8–28 (.222)		
Total:		97–138 (.413)			
National champion Postseason invitational champion Conference regular season champion Conference regular season and conference tournament champion Division regular season champion Division regular season and conference tournament champion Conference tournament champion
