= 1998–99 Detroit Titans men's basketball team =

American college basketball season

1998–99 Detroit Titans men's basketball
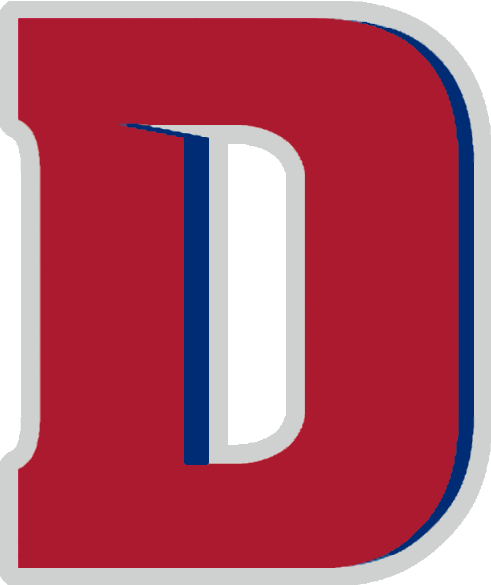

Midwestern Collegiate Conference Regular season champions

NCAA tournament, second round
- Conference: Horizon League
- Record: 25–6 (12–2 Horizon)
- Head coach: Perry Watson (6th season)
- Home arena: Calihan Hall

1998–99 Midwestern Collegiate Conference men's basketball standings
	Conf.				Overall
Team	W		L	PCT	W		L	PCT
Detroit †	12	–	2	.857	25	–	6	.806
Butler	11	–	3	.786	22	–	10	.688
Green Bay	9	–	5	.643	20	–	11	.645
Loyola Chicago	7	–	7	.500	9	–	18	.333
Cleveland State	6	–	8	.429	14	–	14	.500
Milwaukee	5	–	9	.357	8	–	19	.296
Wright State	4	–	10	.286	9	–	18	.333
UIC	2	–	12	.143	7	–	21	.250
† 1999 MCC tournament winner

The 1998–99 Detroit Titans men's basketball team represented the University of Detroit Mercy in the 1998–99 NCAA Division I men's basketball season. Led by coach Perry Watson, the Titans played their home games at Calihan Hall as members of the Midwestern Collegiate Conference. They finished the season 25–6 overall, 12–2 in Horizon League play to win the regular season league title.

Playing in the MCC tournament as the No. 1 seed, they defeated UIC, Cleveland State, and Butler to win the conference tournament title and received an automatic bid to the NCAA tournament as No. 12 seed in the South region. The Titans beat No. 5 seed UCLA in the opening round before losing to No. 4 seed Ohio State in the second round.

This 1998–99 team, which tied the school record with 25 wins, reached the NCAA Tournament in back-to-back seasons for the first, and only, time in school history.

== Roster ==
1998–99 Detroit Titans men's basketball team
Players
Coaches

Pos.	#	Name	Height	Weight	Year	Hometown
G		Jermaine Jackson	6 ft 4 in (1.93 m)	162 lb (73 kg)	Sr	Detroit, Michigan
G	3	Rashad Phillips	5 ft 10 in (1.78 m)	204 lb (93 kg)	So	Detroit, Michigan
G		Desmond Ferguson	6 ft 7 in (2.01 m)	203 lb (92 kg)	Jr	Lansing, Michigan
F		Bacari Alexander	6 ft 6 in (1.98 m)	—	Sr	Detroit, Michigan
F		Daniel Whye	6 ft 8 in (2.03 m)	—	Jr
C		Walter Craft	6 ft 11 in (2.11 m)	264 lb (120 kg)	So	Detroit, Michigan
G		Darius Belin	6 ft 4 in (1.93 m)	179 lb (81 kg)	Fr	Detroit, Michigan
F		Julian Van Dyke	6 ft 7 in (2.01 m)	—	Jr
G		Brandon Gray	6 ft 3 in (1.91 m)	—	So
F		Michael Jordan	6 ft 6 in (1.98 m)	—	So
F		Russell Howard	6 ft 4 in (1.93 m)	—	So
G		Kareem Maine	—	185 lb (84 kg)	So	Detroit, Michigan
G		Cliff Austin	5 ft 10 in (1.78 m)	162 lb (73 kg)	So	Detroit, Michigan
F		Paul Whiting	6 ft 5 in (1.96 m)	—	Sr

Head coach

- Perry Watson

Assistant coach(es)

Legend

- (C) Team captain
- (S) Suspended
- (I) Ineligible
- (W) Walk-on
- Injured
- Current redshirt

Roster

== Schedule and results ==
Date time, TV	Rank^{#}	Opponent^{#}	Result	Record	Site city, state
Regular season
Nov 17, 1998*		Bethune–Cookman	W 84–50	1–0	Calihan Hall; Detroit, Michigan
Nov 19, 1998*		at Michigan	L 55–62	1–1	Crisler Arena; Ann Arbor, Michigan
Nov 24, 1998*		at Bowling Green	W 72–70	2–1	Anderson Arena; Bowling Green, Ohio
Nov 28, 1998*		Texas Southern	W 72–51	3–1	Calihan Hall; Detroit, Michigan
Dec 1, 1998*		at Western Michigan	W 63–51	4–1	University Arena; Kalamazoo, Michigan
Dec 4, 1998*		vs. Gonzaga; Hawkeye Invitational	W 49–48	5–1	Carver-Hawkeye Arena; Iowa City, Iowa
Dec 5, 1998*		at Iowa; Hawkeye Invitational	L 60–61	5–2	Carver-Hawkeye Arena (10,978); Iowa City, Iowa
Dec 9, 1998*		Central Michigan	W 60–51	6–2	Calihan Hall; Detroit, Michigan
Dec 12, 1998*		Wayne State	W 68–62	7–2	Calihan Hall; Detroit, Michigan
Dec 19, 1998*		at UMass	L 46–59	7–3	Mullins Center; Amherst, Massachusetts
Dec 28, 1998*		vs. Grambling State; Don Haskins Sun Bowl Invitational	W 67–56	8–3	Don Haskins Center; El Paso, Texas
Dec 29, 1998*		at UTEP; Don Haskins Sun Bowl Invitational	W 47–44	9–3	Don Haskins Center; El Paso, Texas
Jan 2, 1999		at Milwaukee	W 71–54	10–3 (1–0)	Klotsche Center; Milwaukee, Wisconsin
Jan 4, 1999		at Green Bay	W 43–37	11–3 (2–0)	Brown County Arena; Ashwaubenon, Wisconsin
Jan 7, 1999		Loyola	W 58–39	12–3 (3–0)	Calihan Hall; Detroit, Michigan
Jan 9, 1999		Illinois–Chicago	W 70–42	13–3 (4–0)	Calihan Hall; Detroit, Michigan
Jan 16, 1999		at Butler	L 46–59	13–4 (4–1)	Hinkle Fieldhouse; Indianapolis, Indiana
Jan 19, 1999		at Wright State	W 68–56	14–4 (5–1)	Ervin J. Nutter Center; Fairborn, Ohio
Jan 23, 1999		at Cleveland State	W 73–58	15–4 (6–1)	Henry J. Goodman Arena; Cleveland, Ohio
Jan 28, 1999		Milwaukee	W 78–53	16–4 (7–1)	Calihan Hall; Detroit, Michigan
Jan 30, 1999		Green Bay	W 67–54	17–4 (8–1)	Calihan Hall; Detroit, Michigan
Feb 4, 1999		at Loyola	L 69–72	17–5 (8–2)	Joseph J. Gentile Center; Chicago, Illinois
Feb 6, 1999		at Illinois-Chicago	W 69–50	18–5 (9–2)	UIC Pavilion; Chicago, Illinois
Feb 11, 1999		Butler	W 62–52	19–5 (10–2)	Calihan Hall; Detroit, Michigan
Feb 13, 1999		Wright State	W 64–46	20–5 (11–2)	Calihan Hall; Detroit, Michigan
Feb 20, 1999		Cleveland State	W 78–66	21–5 (12–2)	Calihan Hall; Detroit, Michigan
MWCC Tournament
Feb 27, 1999*		at Illinois-Chicago; Quarterfinals	W 55–51	22–5	UIC Pavilion; Chicago, Illinois
Feb 28, 1999*		vs. Cleveland State; Semifinals	W 80–65	23–5	UIC Pavilion; Chicago, Illinois
Mar 2, 1999*		vs. Butler; Championship game	W 72–65	24–5	UIC Pavilion; Chicago, Illinois
NCAA Tournament
Mar 11, 1999*	(12 S)	vs. (5 S) No. 15 UCLA; First Round	W 56–53	25–5	RCA Dome; Indianapolis, Indiana
Mar 13, 1999*		vs. (4 S) No. 14 Ohio State; Second Round	L 44–75	25–6	RCA Dome; Indianapolis, Indiana
*Non-conference game. ^{#}Rankings from AP poll. (#) Tournament seedings in parentheses. S=South.
