= Perry Watson =

American college basketball coach

Biographical details
- Born: April 30, 1950 (age 76); Detroit, Michigan, U.S.

Playing career
- 1968–1970: Henry Ford CC
- 1970–1972: Eastern Michigan

Coaching career (HC unless noted)
- 1979–1991: Southwestern HS (MI)
- 1991–1993: Michigan (assistant)
- 1993–2008: Detroit

Head coaching record
- Overall: 258–185 (.582) (college)
- Tournaments: 2–2 (NCAA Division I); 3–3 (NIT)

Accomplishments and honors

Championships
- 2 MCC tournament (1994, 1999); 2 MCC regular season (1998, 1999)

Awards
- MCC Coach of the Year (1998)

Perry Watson (born April 30, 1950) is an American college basketball coach from Detroit, Michigan. He played for Eastern Michigan University (where he was a teammate of George Gervin), graduating in 1972.

In 1977, Watson took the head coaching position at Detroit Southwestern High School where he coached, among others, future NBA players Jalen Rose, Voshon Lenard and Howard Eisley. Watson left Southwestern to take a position on Steve Fisher's staff at the University of Michigan in 1991, coinciding with the arrival of the Fab Five of which Rose was a member.

After two years as an assistant under Fisher, Watson was hired as the head coach at the University of Detroit Mercy, where he spent the next 15 seasons. He compiled a record of 258–185, second in school history behind only Bob Calihan. He led the Titans to three Horizon League titles, along with their first NCAA Tournament wins since advancing all the way to the Sweet 16 in 1977.

Watson took an indefinite medical leave of absence in January 2008. He resigned on March 5, 2008. Perry Watson was an important character witness in the University of Michigan basketball scandal.

== Head coaching record ==
=== College ===
Record table
| Season | Team | Overall | Conference | Standing | Postseason |
|---|---|---|---|---|---|
Detroit Titans (Midwestern Collegiate Conference / Horizon League) (1993–2008)
| 1993–94 | Detroit | 16–13 | 5–5 | 4th | |
| 1994–95 | Detroit | 13–15 | 9–5 | 4th | |
| 1995–96 | Detroit | 18–11 | 8–8 | T–4th | |
| 1996–97 | Detroit | 16–13 | 11–5 | T–2nd | |
| 1997–98 | Detroit | 25–6 | 12–2 | T–1st | NCAA Division I Second Round |
| 1998–99 | Detroit | 25–6 | 12–2 | 1st | NCAA Division I Second Round |
| 1999–00 | Detroit | 20–12 | 8–6 | 3rd | |
| 2000–01 | Detroit | 25–12 | 10–4 | 2nd | NIT Fourth Place |
| 2001–02 | Detroit | 18–13 | 11–5 | T–2nd | NIT Opening Round |
| 2002–03 | Detroit | 18–12 | 9–7 | T–4th | |
| 2003–04 | Detroit | 19–11 | 10–6 | T–4th | |
| 2004–05 | Detroit | 14–16 | 9–7 | 3rd | |
| 2005–06 | Detroit | 16–16 | 8–8 | T–3rd | |
| 2006–07 | Detroit | 11–19 | 6–10 | T–7th | |
| 2007–08 | Detroit | 4–10 | 0–4 | – | |
| Detroit: | | 258–185 (.582) | 128–84 (.604) | | |
| Total: | | 258–185 (.582) | | | |
National champion Postseason invitational champion Conference regular season champion Conference regular season and conference tournament champion Division regular season champion Division regular season and conference tournament champion Conference tournament champion
