= 1999 Midwestern Collegiate Conference men's basketball tournament =

- Classification: Division I
- Season: 1998–99
- Teams: 8
- Site: UIC Pavilion; Chicago, Illinois
- Champions: Detroit
- Winning coach: Perry Watson
- MVP: Rashad Phillips (Detroit)

1998–99 Midwestern Collegiate Conference men's basketball standings
	Conf.				Overall
Team	W		L	PCT	W		L	PCT
Detroit †	12	–	2	.857	25	–	6	.806
Butler	11	–	3	.786	22	–	10	.688
Green Bay	9	–	5	.643	20	–	11	.645
Loyola Chicago	7	–	7	.500	9	–	18	.333
Cleveland State	6	–	8	.429	14	–	14	.500
Milwaukee	5	–	9	.357	8	–	19	.296
Wright State	4	–	10	.286	9	–	18	.333
UIC	2	–	12	.143	7	–	21	.250
† 1999 MCC tournament winner

The 1999 Midwestern Collegiate Conference men's basketball tournament took place at the end of the 1999–2000 regular season. The tournament was hosted by University of Illinois at Chicago.

== Seeds ==
All Midwestern Collegiate Conference schools played in the tournament. Teams were seeded by 1999–2000 Midwestern Collegiate Conference season record, with a tiebreaker system to seed teams with identical conference records.

== Bracket ==
Quarterfinals
1	Detroit	55
8	UIC	51
4	Loyola Chicago	59
5	Cleveland State	65
2	Butler	64
7	Wright State	56
3	Green Bay	72
6	Milwaukee	66

Semifinals
1	Detroit	80
5	Cleveland State	65
2	Butler	68
3	Green Bay	65

Championship
1	Detroit	72
2	Butler	65
