= 1983 NCAA Division II women's basketball tournament =

American collegiate basketball tournament

- Teams: 24
- Finals site: , (Massachusetts) Springfield, MA
- Champions: Virginia Union Panthers (1st title)
- Runner-up: Cal Poly Pomona Broncos (2nd title game)
- Semifinalists: Central Missouri State Jennies (1st Final Four); Southern Connecticut Owls (1st Final Four)
- Winning coach: Louis Hearn (1st title)
- MOP: Paris McWhirter (Virginia Union)

The 1983 NCAA Division II women's basketball tournament was the second annual tournament hosted by the NCAA to determine the team national champion of women's collegiate basketball among its Division II membership in the United States.

Virginia Union defeated defending champions Cal Poly Pomona in the championship game, 73–60, to claim their first Division II national title.

The championship rounds were contested at the Springfield Civic Center in Springfield, Massachusetts, hosted by Springfield College.

== Qualifying ==
A total of twenty-four teams qualified for this year's tournament, an increase of eight from 1982.

== Regionals ==
=== Northeast/East - Buffalo, New York ===
Location: Koessler Athletic Center

First round Round of 24; March 10
New Haven, Connecticut
Bentley	64
Stonehill	62
C.W. Post	60
Florida International	59

Regional semifinals Sweet 16; March 11
So. Conn. State	60
Bentley	53
Canisius	71
C.W. Post	59

Regional final Elite Eight; March 19
So. Conn. State	63
Canisius	60

=== Great Lakes/West - Pomona, California ===
Location: Kellogg Gym

First round Round of 24; March 10
Rochester, Michigan
Dayton	71
Butler	69
Chapman	91
San Francisco State	64

Regional semifinals Sweet 16; March 11
Oakland	72
Dayton	73
Cal Poly Pomona	76
Chapman	64

Regional final Elite Eight; March 19
Dayton	66
Cal Poly Pomona	90

=== South/South Atlantic - Richmond, Virginia ===
Location: Arthur Ashe Center

First round Round of 24; March 10
Valdosta, Georgia
Tuskegee	83
Central Florida	68
Emmitsburg, Maryland
Virginia Union	78
Norfolk State	66

Regional semifinals Sweet 16; March 11
Valdosta State	106
Tuskegee	81
Mount St. Mary's	79
Virginia Union	88

Regional final Elite Eight; March 19
Valdosta State	65
Virginia Union	75

=== Midwest/South Central - St. Cloud, Minnesota ===
Location: Halenbeck Hall

First round Round of 24; March 10
Warrensburg, Missouri †forfeit
SE Missouri State	2
Abilene Christian	0†
Texas A&I	81
South Dakota	71

Regional semifinals Sweet 16; March 11
Cen. Missouri State	71
SE Missouri State	50
St. Cloud State	74
Texas A&I	57

Regional final Elite Eight; March 19
Cen. Missouri State	65
St. Cloud State	63

== Final Four – Springfield, Massachusetts ==
Location: Springfield Civic Center Host: Springfield College

National semifinals Final Four; March 24
So. Conn. State	56
Cal Poly Pomona	60
Virginia Union	75
Cen. Missouri State	72

National championship March 26
Cal Poly Pomona	60
Virginia Union	73

== All-tournament team ==
- Paris McWhirter, Virginia Union (MOP)
- Barvenia Wooten, Virginia Union
- Jackie White, Cal Poly Pomona
- Lisa Ulmer, Cal Poly Pomona
- Carla Eades, Central Missouri State

== See also ==
- NCAA Women's Division III Basketball Championship
- 1983 NCAA Division I women's basketball tournament
- 1983 NCAA Division III women's basketball tournament
- 1983 NCAA Division II men's basketball tournament
- 1983 NCAA Division III men's basketball tournament
- NAIA Women's Basketball Championships
