= Loudon Love =

American basketball player (born 1998)

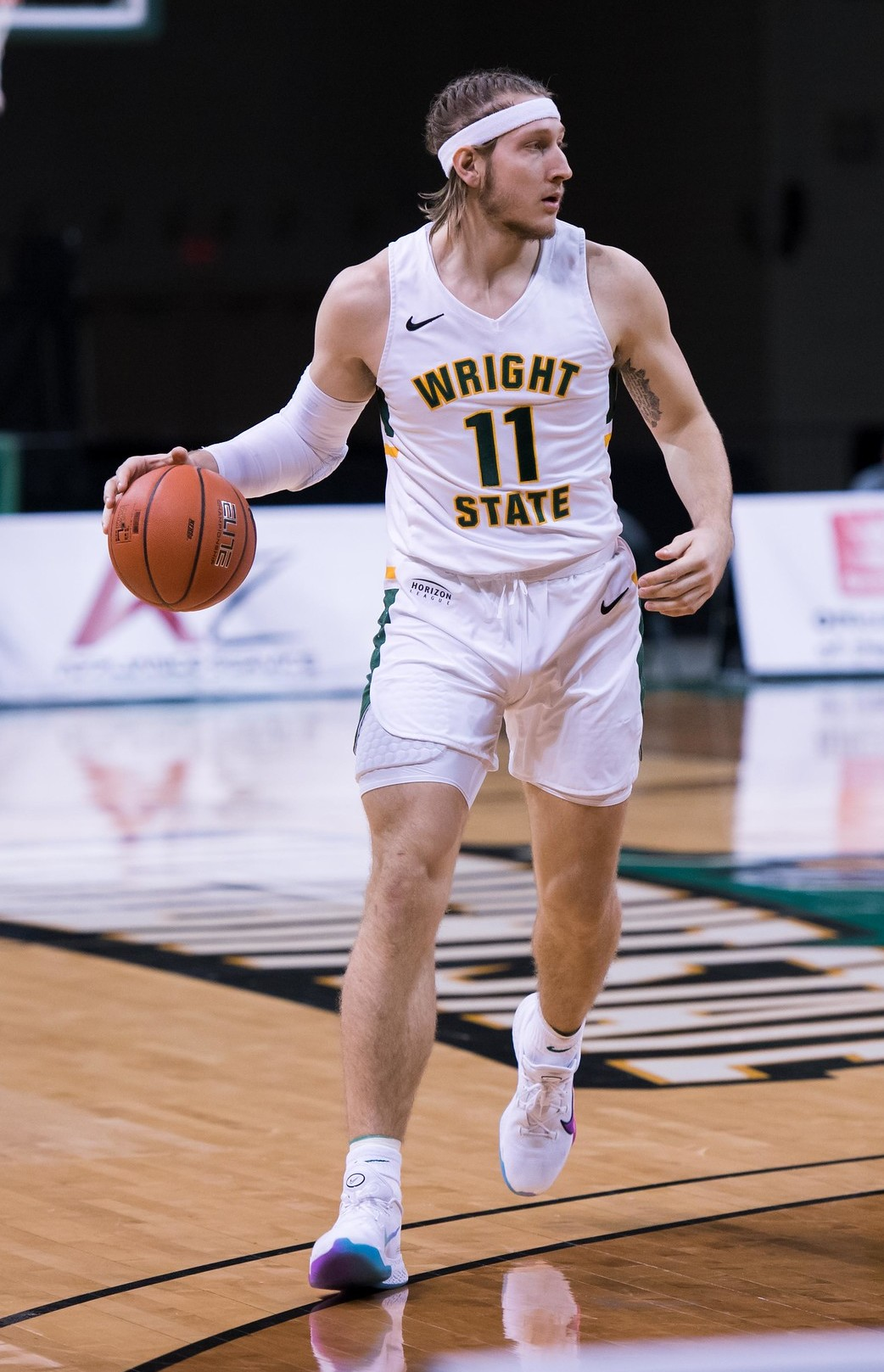
- Love with Wright State in 2021

Southern Illinois Salukis
- Position: Assistant coach
- Conference: Missouri Valley Conference

Personal information
- Born: April 21, 1998 (age 28) Geneva, Illinois, U.S.
- Listed height: 6 ft 8 in (2.03 m)
- Listed weight: 260 lb (118 kg)

Career information
- High school: Geneva (Geneva, Illinois)
- College: Wright State (2017–2021)
- NBA draft: 2021: undrafted
- Playing career: 2021–present

Career history
- 2021–2022: Texas Legends
- 2023–2024: Memphis Hustle
- 2024: Carpegna Prosciutto Basket Pesaro
- 2024: Niagara River Lions
- 2024: Mexico City Capitanes
- 2025: Cleveland Charge
- 2025: Raptors 905

Career highlights
- CEBL champion (2024); 2× Horizon League Player of the Year (2020, 2021); 3× First-team All-Horizon League (2019–2021); Second-team All-Horizon League (2018); Horizon League All-Defensive Team (2021); Horizon League Freshman of the Year (2018)

Loudon Love (born Loudon Love Vollbrecht on April 21, 1998) is an American basketball coach and former player who is currently an assistant coach for the Southern Illinois Salukis of the Missouri Valley Conference.

== Early life ==
Love's parents divorced when he was in middle school and he moved from Vermont to Illinois with his mother, Laura Love.

Love attended Geneva Community High School, where he competed in basketball and football. As a junior, he averaged 11 points and 6.8 rebounds per game for a 30-win team. Love played offensive tackle on the gridiron and received a scholarship offer from Illinois. In November 2015, Love was injured during the last play of Geneva's 41-22 Class 7A playoff loss to Bradley-Bourbonnais Community High School. An MRI revealed he tore his ACL, forcing him to miss his senior year in basketball.

After receiving basketball offers from Northern Illinois, Western Illinois, Northern Kentucky, UMBC, and UMass Lowell, he committed to play under coach Scott Nagy at South Dakota State, and followed him to Wright State when he received the coaching job there. He legally changed his last name from Vollbrecht to Love, his mother's last name, in honor of her sacrifices growing up.

== College career ==
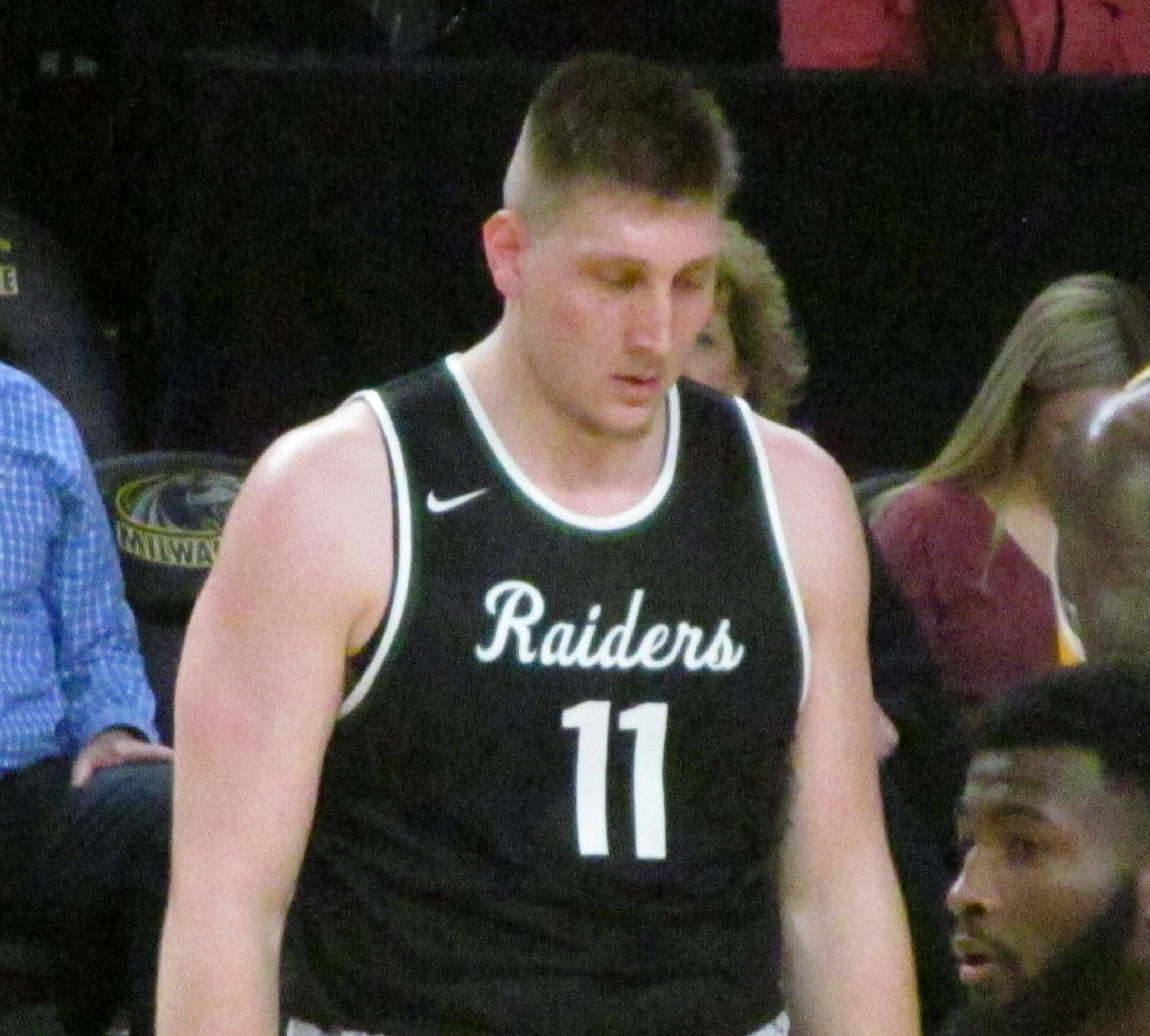
Love with Wright State in 2019

Love was redshirted his first season at Wright State, spending the season trying to get in shape by doing intensified workouts and going on a restricted diet.

On January 7, 2018, Love scored 25 points and had 17 rebounds and five blocks in a win against Oakland, earning Horizon League freshman of the week honors. As a freshman, he averaged 12.9 points and 9.8 rebounds per game on a team that finished 25-10 and reached the NCAA Tournament. He was named Horizon League Freshman of the Year and Second Team All-Conference.

As a sophomore, he averaged 15.1 points and 8.2 rebounds per game and had 12 double-doubles. Love was named to the First Team All-Horizon League and District 12 First Team by the National Association of Basketball Coaches.

On November 9, 2019, Love had 26 points and 14 rebounds in an 85–62 win over Miami (OH). He fractured his elbow during a game against La Salle on November 26 and missed several weeks. Love earned Horizon League player of the week honors on December 31 after a 22-point, 16-rebound performance against Green Bay. Love had 21 points and nine rebounds during a win against Youngstown State on January 18, 2020, though coach Scott Nagy was upset with his performance. He was named Horizon League player of the week on February 17, after contributing 24 points and nine rebounds in a win over UIC. Love was named Horizon League player of the year at the conclusion of the regular season. Love averaged 15.9 points and 9.7 rebounds per game.

On January 9, 2021, Love collected his 1,000th career rebound in a win over Youngstown State. He scored a career-high 34 points and had 11 rebounds on January 30, in a 86–56 victory over Robert Morris Colonials. As a senior, he averaged 16.6 points, 10.1 rebounds, and 1.9 assists per game, shooting 56.5 percent. Love garnered Horizon League player of the year honors for the second consecutive season.

== Professional career ==
=== Texas Legends (2021–2022) ===
On July 16, 2021, Love signed his first professional contract with Stade Rochelais of the Nationale Masculine 1 in France, but did not play for the team. He was selected 10th overall in the 2021 NBA G League draft by the Texas Legends. On January 31, 2022, Love was waived after suffering a season-ending knee injury.

=== Memphis Hustle (2023–2024) ===
On October 30, 2023, Love joined the Memphis Hustle.

=== Carpegna Prosciutto Basket Pesaro (2024) ===
On April 4, 2024, Love signed with Carpegna Prosciutto Basket Pesaro of the Lega Basket Serie A.

=== Niagara River Lions (2024) ===
On May 13, 2024, Love signed with the Niagara River Lions of the Canadian Elite Basketball League.

=== Mexico City Capitanes (2024) ===
On October 28, 2024, Love signed with the Mexico City Capitanes.

=== Cleveland Charge (2025) ===
On February 20, 2025, Love signed with the Cleveland Charge.

=== Raptors 905 (2025) ===
On March 7, 2025, Love's rights were traded to the Raptors 905

== Coaching career ==
Love transitioned from playing to coaching in August 2026, when he was hired as an assistant coach at Southern Illinois.
