= 1982–83 Wright State Raiders men's basketball team =

American college basketball season

1982–83 Wright State Raiders men's basketball

NCAA Division II National Champions
- Conference: Independent
- Record: 28–4
- Head coach: Ralph Underhill (5th season)
- Assistant coaches: Jim Brown; Bob Grote; John Ross
- Home arena: WSU Physical Education Building

The 1982–83 Wright State Raiders men's basketball team represented Wright State University during the 1982–83 NCAA Division II men's basketball season. The Raiders, led by head coach Ralph Underhill, played their home games at the Wright State Physical Education Building in Dayton, Ohio. They were the 1983 NCAA Division II national champions.

== Roster ==
1982–83 Wright State Raiders men's basketball team
Players
Coaches

Pos.	#	Name	Height	Weight	Year	Hometown
C	24	Gary Monroe	6 ft 7 in (2.01 m)	190 lb (86 kg)	Sr	Washington D.C.
F	40	Fred Moore	6 ft 7.5 in (2.02 m)	190 lb (86 kg)	Jr	Louisville, Kentucky
F	23	Tom Holzapfel	6 ft 6 in (1.98 m)	185 lb (84 kg)	Sr	Greenville, Ohio
F	42	Anthony Bias	6 ft 4 in (1.93 m)	180 lb (82 kg)	Sr	Milwaukee, Wisconsin
G	34	Mark McCormick	6 ft 3 in (1.91 m)	160 lb (73 kg)	So	Kettering, Ohio
F	35	Steve Purcell	6 ft 4 in (1.93 m)	180 lb (82 kg)	Jr	Kokomo, Indiana
G	30	Mike Grote	6 ft 1 in (1.85 m)	175 lb (79 kg)	Jr	Cincinnati, Ohio
G	20	T.C. Johnson	6 ft 0 in (1.83 m)	170 lb (77 kg)	Jr	Sidney, Ohio
G	22	Eric Ellis	6 ft 1 in (1.85 m)	158 lb (72 kg)	Sr	Cincinnati, Ohio
F	32	Rob Sanders	6 ft 6 in (1.98 m)	205 lb (93 kg)	Fr	Columbus, Ohio
F	43	Eric Ernst	6 ft 4 in (1.93 m)	200 lb (91 kg)	So	Middletown, Ohio
C	45	Phil Benninger	6 ft 8 in (2.03 m)	215 lb (98 kg)	So	New Albany, Indiana
F	44	Andy Warner	6 ft 5 in (1.96 m)	200 lb (91 kg)	So	Piqua, Ohio

Head coach

- Ralph Underhill (Tennessee Tech)

Assistant coach(es)

Jim Brown, Bob Grote, John Ross

Legend

- (C) Team captain
- (S) Suspended
- (I) Ineligible
- (W) Walk-on
- Injured
- Current redshirt

== Schedule and results ==
Date time, TV	Rank^{#}	Opponent^{#}	Result	Record	Site city, state
Regular season
Dec 1, 1982		Southern Indiana	W 92-81	1–0	WSU PE Building (1,600); Dayton, Ohio
Dec 8, 1982		at Indianapolis	W 65-60	2–0	Nicoson Hall (1,500); Indianapolis, IN
Dec 11, 1982		Thomas More	W 96-82	3–0	WSU PE Building (1,100); Fairborn, Ohio
Dec 15, 1982		Alderson-Broaddus	W 107-88	4–0	WSU PE Building (1,000); Dayton, Ohio
Dec 18, 1982		West Virginia State	W 78-61	5–0	WSU PE Building (957); Dayton, Ohio
Dec 21, 1982		Spring Hill	W 97-57	6–0	WSU PE Building (950); Dayton, Ohio
Dec 22, 1982		at Bellarmine	W 98-91	7–0	Knights Hall (1,721); Louisville, Kentucky
Jan 4, 1983		Spring Hill	W 92-79	8–0	WSU PE Building (2,182); Dayton, Ohio
Jan 7, 1983		SIU Edwardsville	W 68-58	9–0	WSU PE Building (2,010); Dayton, Ohio
Jan 8, 1983		Central State	L 67-89	9–1	WSU PE Building (2,300); Dayton, Ohio
Jan 12, 1983		at IUPUI	W 76-65	10–1	(150); Indianapolis, Indiana
Jan 15, 1983		Northeastern Illinois	W 83-63	11–1	WSU PE Building (1,550); Dayton, Ohio
Jan 15, 1983		Cheyney	L 60-68	11–2	WSU PE Building (2,556); Dayton, Ohio
Jan 19, 1983		Indianapolis	W 94-76	12–2	WSU PE Building (1,650); Dayton, Ohio
Jan 22, 1983		Fort Wayne	L 53-54 ^{OT}	12–3	WSU PE Building (1,400); Fairborn, Ohio
Jan 26, 1983		Northern Kentucky	W 69-63	13–3	WSU PE Building (2,050); Dayton, Ohio
Jan 29, 1983		at Kentucky Wesleyan	W 65-64	14–3	Owensboro Sportscenter (5,100); Owensboro, Kentucky
Feb 2, 1983		Franklin	W 86-64	15–3	WSU PE Building (1,500); Dayton, Ohio
Feb 5, 1983		Transylvania	W 73-62	16–3	WSU PE Building (2,400); Dayton, Ohio
Feb 8, 1983		vs. Central State	W 55-51	17–3	UD Arena (6,875); Dayton, Ohio
Feb 12, 1983		at Gannon	W 73-62	18–3	(2,600); Erie, Pennsylvania
Feb 14, 1983		Bellarmine	W 103-78	19–3	WSU PE Building (1,460); Dayton, Ohio
Feb 16, 1983		Kentucky Wesleyan	W 80-56	20–3	WSU PE Building (2,410); Fairborn, Ohio
Feb 22, 1983	No. 5	at Louisville	L 55-71	20–4	Freedom Hall (16,441); Louisville, Kentucky
Feb 24, 1983		at Indiana Tech	W 101-74	21–4	WSU PE Building (1,930); Fairborn, Ohio
Feb 26, 1983		at Transylvania	W 88-70	22–4	(662); Lexington, Kentucky
Mar 2, 1983		St. Joseph’s	W 130-92	23–4	WSU PE Building (2,100); Dayton, Ohio
NCAA tournament
Mar 11, 1983		vs. Lewis	W 71-57	24–4	Owensboro Sportscenter (4,625); Owensboro, KY
Mar 12, 1983		at Kentucky Wesleyan	W 69-67	25–4	Owensboro Sportscenter (4,950); Owensboro,(KY)
Mar 19, 1983		at Bloomsburg State	W 73-53	26–4	Nelson Fieldhouse (3,000); Bloomsburg, Pennsylvania
Mar 25, 1983		vs. Cal State Bakersfield	W 57-50	27–4	Springfield Civic Center (3,862); Springfield, MA
Mar 26, 1983		vs. District of Columbia	W 92-73	28–4	Springfield Civic Center (4,747); Springfield, MA
*Non-conference game. ^{#}Rankings from AP Poll. (#) Tournament seedings in parentheses. MW=Midwest.

== Awards and honors ==
Gary Monroe	MVP
Gary Monroe	All-American Div-II
T.C. Johnson	Raider Award
Steve Purcell	Raider Award

== Statistics ==
Number	Name	GP	Average	Points	Rebounds	Blocks	Steals
24	Gary Monroe	30	28.8	563	228	14	51
40	Fred Moore	30	14.3	428	169	30	44
23	Tom Holzapfel	29	11.2	325	97	0	18
42	Anthony Bias	28	9.1	256	111	12	49
34	Mark McCormick	30	6.4	191	47	4	22
35	Steve Purcell	30	6.3	188	102	12	29
30	Mike Grote	28	5.7	165	42	0	27
20	T.C. Johnson	30	4.5	135	42	2	25
22	Eric Ellis	18	2.7	48	8	0	6
32	Rob Sanders	24	2.6	63	29	0	7
43	Eric Ernst	24	2.2	40	12	0	1
45	Phil Benninger	6	2.0	12	7	0	1
44	Andy Warner	3	2.0	6	1	0	1
