= 1979–80 Wright State Raiders men's basketball team =

American college basketball season

1979–80 Wright State Raiders men's basketball

NCAA tournament, 3rd Place Great Lakes Regional
- Conference: Independent
- Record: 25-3
- Head coach: Ralph Underhill (2nd season)
- Assistant coaches: Jim Brown; Bob Grote
- Home arena: WSU PE Building

The 1979–80 Wright State Raiders men's basketball team represented Wright State University in the 1979–80 NCAA NCAA Division II men's basketball season led by head coach Ralph Underhill.

== Season summary ==
The 1979-80 Raiders dominated, running off an astounding 25-3 record. They made their third trip to the NCAA Division II tournament.

== Roster ==
1979–80 Wright State Raiders men's basketball team
Players
Coaches

Pos.	#	Name	Height	Weight	Year	Previous school	Hometown
F	33	Flenoil Crook	6 ft 8 in (2.03 m)	190 lb (86 kg)	Sr	Jacksonville	Louisville, Kentucky
F	40	Joe Fitzpatrick	6 ft 6 in (1.98 m)	200 lb (91 kg)	Sr	Mt. Healthy	Cincinnati, Ohio
C	42	Steve Hartings	6 ft 8 in (2.03 m)	200 lb (91 kg)	Sr	Marion Local	Maria Stein, Ohio
G	30	Bill Wilson	6 ft 2 in (1.88 m)	160 lb (73 kg)	Jr	Eastmoor	Columbus, Ohio
F	24	Rodney Benson	6 ft 6 in (1.98 m)	195 lb (88 kg)	Jr	Cleveland St. (TN)	Louisville, Kentucky
F	25	Jeff Bragg	6 ft 5 in (1.96 m)	180 lb (82 kg)	Jr	Marion	Marion, Indiana
G	34	Eddie Crowe	6 ft 1 in (1.85 m)	170 lb (77 kg)	Jr	Carlisle	Carlisle, Ohio
F	45	Leon Manning	6 ft 6 in (1.98 m)	170 lb (77 kg)	Jr	Northwest	Indianapolis
G	20	Keith Miller	6 ft 2 in (1.88 m)	180 lb (82 kg)	Jr	Cleveland St. (TN)	Louisville, Kentucky
F	44	Roman Welch	6 ft 6 in (1.98 m)	205 lb (93 kg)	Jr	S. Plantation	Ft. Lauderdale, Florida
G	32	Mike Zimmerman	6 ft 1 in (1.85 m)	170 lb (77 kg)	Jr	Alter	Kettering, Ohio
F	23	Tom Holzapfel	6 ft 5 in (1.96 m)	185 lb (84 kg)	So	Greenville	Greenville, Ohio
G/F	35	Clay Pickering	6 ft 5 in (1.96 m)	205 lb (93 kg)	Fr	Hoban	Akron, Ohio
G	22	Barry Turner	6 ft 0 in (1.83 m)	185 lb (84 kg)	Fr	Wilmington	Wilmington, Ohio

Head coach

- Ralph Underhill

Assistant coach(es)

Jim Brown, Bob Grote

Legend

- (C) Team captain
- (S) Suspended
- (I) Ineligible
- (W) Walk-on
- Injured
- Current redshirt

== Schedule and results ==
Date time, TV	Rank^{#}	Opponent^{#}	Result	Record	Site city, state
Regular season
Dec 12, 1979		Oakland	W 84-58	1–0	WSU PE Building; Fairborn, OH
Dec 3, 1979		Campbellsville	W 93-79	2–0	WSU PE Building; Fairborn, OH
Dec 5, 1979		at Indiana Central	W 95-84	3-0	Nicoson Hall; Indianapolis
Dec 8, 1979		Wayne State	W 92-75	5-0	WSU PE Building; Fairborn, OH
Dec 10, 1979		at Miami Ohio	W 83-68	6–0	Millett Assembly Hall; Oxford, Ohio
Dec 13, 1979		Armstrong State	W 99-85	6-0	UD Arena; Dayton, Ohio
Dec 15, 1979		Otterbein	W 69-65	7-0	UD Arena; Dayton, Ohio
Dec 20, 1979		St. Joseph’s (IN)	W 115-81	8-0	WSU PE Building; Fairborn, OH
Dec 22, 1979		Bellarmine	W 102-79	9-0	WSU PE Building; Fairborn, OH
Jan 3, 1979		Wilberforce	W 82-58	10-0	WSU PE Building; Fairborn, OH
Jan 7, 1980		vs. Central State	L 60-69	10-1	UD Arena; Dayton, Ohio
Jan 9, 1980		Indiana Central	W 84-74	11–1	WSU PE Building; Fairborn, OH
Jan 12, 1980		Heidelberg	W 97-55	12–1	WSU PE Building; Fairborn, OH
Jan 16, 1980		at St. Joseph’s (IN)	W 72-68	13–1	Roberts Municipal Stadium; Evansville, Indiana
Jan 19, 1980		Elmhurst	W 101-59	14–1	WSU PE Building; Fairborn, OH
Jan 23, 1980		Marion	W 122-86	15–1	WSU PE Building; Fairborn, OH
Jan 26, 1980		at IUPUI	W 92-77	16-1	Harry E. Wood Continuing Education Center; Indianapolis
Jan 30, 1980		at Northern Kentucky	W 116-66	17-1	Regents Hall; Highland Heights, Kentucky
Feb 2, 1980		Thomas Moore	W 73-70	18–1	WSU PE Building; Fairborn, OH
Feb 4, 1980		at Rice	L 78-84	18–2	Autry Court; Houston, Texas
Feb 9, 1980		at Bellarmine	W 66-63	19-2	Knights Hall; Louisville, Kentucky
Feb 11, 1980		Missouri–St. Louis	W 82-69	20-2	UD Arena; Dayton, Ohio
Feb 16, 1980		Northern Kentucky	W 88-70	21-2	WSU PE Building; Fairborn, OH
Feb 18, 1980		Youngstown State	W 72-61	22-2	WSU PE Building; Fairborn, OH
Feb 23, 1980		SIU Edwardsville	W 97-88	23-2	WSU PE Building; Fairborn, OH
Feb 25, 1980		at Missouri–St. Louis	W 78-71	24–2	Mark Twain Sports Building; St. Louis, Missouri
NCAA tournament
Feb 29, 1980		Eastern Illinois; NCAA Division II Great Lakes Regional	L 64-73	24-3	WSU PE Building; Fairborn, OH
Mar 1, 1980		Southern Indiana; NCAA Division II Great Lakes Regional	W 88-85	25-3	WSU PE Building; Fairborn, OH
*Non-conference game. ^{#}Rankings from AP Poll. (#) Tournament seedings in parentheses. MW=Midwest.

== Awards and honors ==
Rodney Benson	MVP
Roman Welch	MVP
Eddie Crowe	Raider Award
Steve Hartings	Raider Award

== Statistics ==
Number	Name	Games	Average	Points	Assists	Rebounds
44	Roman Welch	27	17.9	484	48	225
24	Rodney Benson	28	15.6	436	37	180
30	Bill Wilson	28	11.3	316	133	74
42	Steve Hartings	28	9.9	277	71	169
34	Eddie Crowe	26	9.8	255	92	68
45	Leon Manning	26	7.0	181	23	111
20	Keith Miller	26	5.0	129	32	41
25	Jeff Bragg	27	4.6	123	36	48
35	Clay Pickering	25	4.5	113	7	61
32	Mike Zimmerman	21	3.4	72	31	23
40	Joe Fitzpatrick	14	1.6	23	1	26
23	Tom Holzapfel	15	1.5	23	10	18
33	Flenoil Crook	3	2.7	8	0	1
22	Barry Turner	3	1.0	3	1	1
