= 1983 NCAA Division III men's basketball tournament =

American collegiate men's basketball tournament (1983)

- Teams: 32
- Finals site: , Grand Rapids, Michigan
- Champions: Scranton Royals (2nd title)
- Runner-up: Wittenberg Tigers (3rd title game)
- Semifinalists: Roanoke Maroons (1st Final Four); Wisconsin–Whitewater Warhawks (1st Final Four)
- Winning coach: Bob Bessoir (Scranton)
- MOP: Bill Bessoir (Scranton)
- Attendance: 36,731

The 1983 NCAA Division III men's basketball tournament was the ninth annual single-elimination tournament to determine the national champions of National Collegiate Athletic Association (NCAA) men's Division III collegiate basketball in the United States.

Held during March 1983, the field included 32 teams and the final championship rounds were contested at Calvin College in Grand Rapids, Michigan.

Scranton defeated Wittenberg, 64–63, to claim their second national title.

== Bracket ==
=== Regionals ===
First round
Clark (MA)	82
UMass Boston	71
Bridgewater State	56
Muskingum	54

Regional Championship
Clark (MA)	82
Bridgewater State	80
Regional Third-place
UMass Boston	75
Muskingum	68

First round
Roanoke	66
North Carolina Wesleyan	63
William Paterson	70
Upsala	58

Regional Championship
Roanoke	58
William Paterson	56
Regional Third-place
North Carolina Wesleyan	88
Upsala	97

First round
Potsdam State	76***
Ithaca	74
Hartwick	61
Union (NY)	49

Regional Championship
Potsdam State	60
Hartwick	56
Regional Third-place
Ithaca	69
Union (NY)	89

First round
Scranton	73
Moravian	59
Widener	56
Grove City

Regional Championship
Scranton	74***
Widener	69
Regional Third-place
Moravian	54
Grove City	76

First round
Stanislaus State	80
Augustana (IL)	73
Sonoma State	88
Bishop (TX)	65

Regional Championship
Stanislaus State	71
Sonoma State	61
Regional Third-place
Augustana (IL)	100
Bishop (TX)	104

First round
Hope	81
John Carroll	72
Wittenberg	57
Capital	56

Regional Championship
Hope	55
Wittenberg	63
Regional Third-place
John Carroll	64
Capital	75

First round
Millikin	66
Beloit	49
Wisconsin–Whitewater	62
William Penn	47

Regional Championship
Millikin	61
Wisconsin–Whitewater	63
Regional Third-place
Beloit	68
William Penn	73

First round
St. Andrews	69
Centre (KY)	57
LeMoyne-Owen	76
Rust	62

Regional Championship
St. Andrews	88
LeMoyne-Owen	90*
Regional Third-place
Centre (KY)	58
Rust	59

=== National finals ===
National quarterfinals
Clark (MA)	83
Roanoke	87
Potsdam State	64
Scranton	65
Stanislaus State	65
Wittenberg	68
Wisconsin–Whitewater	94
LeMoyne-Owen	83

National semifinals
Roanoke	67
Scranton	82
Wittenberg	85
Wisconsin–Whitewater	80

National championship
Scranton	64
Wittenberg	63
National third-place game
Roanoke	83
Wisconsin–Whitewater	77

== See also ==
- 1983 NCAA Division I men's basketball tournament
- 1983 NCAA Division II men's basketball tournament
- 1983 NCAA Division III women's basketball tournament
- 1983 NAIA men's basketball tournament
