= Israel Sheinfeld =

Israeli basketball player

Israel Sheinfeld ישראל שיינפלד
Personal information
- Born: July 1, 1976 (age 50) Ramat Gan, Israel
- Listed height: 6 ft 10 in (2.08 m)
- Listed weight: 260 lb (118 kg)

Career information
- High school: Blich High School
- College: Wright State University
- Position: Power forward and center

Israel Sheinfeld (Hebrew: ישראל שיינפלד; born July 1, 1976) is an Israeli former basketball player. He played the power forward and center positions. Sheinfeld played in the Israeli Basketball Premier League, and for the Israeli national basketball team.

== Biography ==
Sheinfeld is from Ramat Gan, Israel, is 6-foot-10-inch (208 cm), and weighs 260 pounds (120 kg). He attended Blich High School in Ramat Gan. He spent three years in the Israel Defense Forces.

He attended Wright State University for college. Sheinfeld played for the Wright State Raiders from 1998 to 2001. In 1999-2000 he led the Midwestern Collegiate Conference in field goal percentage, at .543, and in rebounds per game, at 7.7, was fourth in points per game, at 17.0, was fifth in two-point field goal percentage, at .554, and was sixth in free throw percentage, at .774. He was named to the 2000 All-MCC first team. In 2000-2001 he led the Conference in two-point field goal percentage, at .595, was third in free throw percentage, at .798, and was sixth in points per game, at 14.7, and was seventh in rebounds per game, at 6.1. He passed on his final year of college eligibility, to pursue a professional basketball career.

Sheinfeld played in the Israeli Basketball Premier League for Ironi Ramat Gan, Hapoel Tel Aviv, and Maccabi Rishon LeZion.

He also played for Israel at the 1994 FIBA European Championship for Junior Men and the 1998 European Championship for Men '22 and Under'. Sheinfeld played for the Israeli national basketball team at the 2001 FIBA European Championship for Men, 2003 FIBA European Championship for Men, and 2007 EuroCup.
