= 1983 NCAA Division II men's basketball tournament =

- Teams: 32
- Finals site: , Springfield, Massachusetts
- Champions: Wright State Raiders (1st title)
- Runner-up: UDC Firebirds (2nd title game)
- Semifinalists: Morningside Maroon Chiefs (1st Final Four); Bakersfield State Roadrunners (2nd Final Four)
- Winning coach: Ralph Underhill (1st title)
- MOP: Gary Monroe (Wright State)
- Attendance: 57,893

The 1983 NCAA Division II men's basketball tournament involved 32 schools playing in a single-elimination tournament to determine the national champion of men's NCAA Division II college basketball as a culmination of the 1982–83 NCAA Division II men's basketball season. It was won by Wright State University and Wright State's Gary Monroe was the Most Outstanding Player.

1983 NCAA Division II Men's sites - regionals (cyan) Quarterfinals (orange) Final Four (red)

== Regional participants ==
School	Outcome
Hampton	Third Place
Randolph–Macon	Fourth Place
St. Augustine's	Runner-up
UDC	Regional Champion

School	Outcome
American International	Runner-up
Assumption	Third Place
Central Connecticut	Fourth Place
Sacred Heart	Regional Champion

School	Outcome
Ferris State	Third Place
Morningside	Regional Champion
Nebraska–Omaha	Fourth Place
North Dakota State	Runner-up

School	Outcome
Florida Southern	Third Place
Jacksonville State	Regional Champion
West Chester	Fourth Place
West Georgia	Runner-Up

School	Outcome
Central Missouri State	Runner-up
SE Missouri State	Regional Champion
Stephen F. Austin	Third Place
Tennessee-Martin	Fourth Place

School	Outcome
Cal State Bakersfield	Regional Champion
Chapman	Runner-up
Humboldt State	Fourth Place
San Francisco State	Third Place

School	Outcome
Kentucky Wesleyan	Runner-up
Lewis	Third Place
Southern Connecticut	Fourth Place
Wright State	Regional Champion

School	Outcome
Bloomsburg	Regional Champion
Cheyney	Fourth Place
C. W. Post	Third Place
Philadelphia U	Runner-up

*denotes tie

== Regionals ==
=== South Atlantic - Washington, DC ===
Location: Physical Activities Center Host: University of the District of Columbia

Regional Semifinals; Round of 32; March 11
St. Augustine's	78
Hampton	73
UDC	34
Randolph–Macon	17

Regional Final; Sweet 16; March 12
St. Augustine's	88
UDC	93

- Third Place - Hampton 71, Randolph-Macon 51

=== New England - New Britain, Connecticut ===
Location: Kaiser Hall Host: Central Connecticut State University

Regional Semifinals; Round of 32; March 11
Sacred Heart	113****
Assumption	108
American International	65
Central Connecticut	64

Regional Final; Sweet 16; March 12
Sacred Heart	72
American International	68

- Third Place - Assumption 99, Central Connecticut 89*

=== North Central - Sioux City, Iowa ===
Location: Allee Gym Host: Morningside College

Regional Semifinals; Round of 32; March 11
North Dakota State	71
Ferris State	68
Morningside	80
Nebraska–Omaha	79

Regional Final; Sweet 16; March 12
North Dakota State	77
Morningside	79

- Third Place - Ferris State 81, Nebraska-Omaha 75

=== South - Carrollton, Georgia ===
Location: Health and Physical Education Building Host: University of West Georgia

Regional Semifinals; Round of 32; March 10
Jacksonville State	67
Florida Southern	61
West Georgia	74
West Chester	73

Regional Final; Sweet 16; March 11
Jacksonville State	92
West Georgia	76

- Third Place - Florida Southern 72, West Chester 71

=== South Central - Cape Girardeau, Missouri ===
Location: Houck Field House Host: Southeast Missouri State University

Regional Semifinals; Round of 32; March 11
Central Missouri State	66
Stephen F. Austin	57
SE Missouri State	83
Tennessee–Martin	71

Regional Final; Sweet 16; March 12
Central Missouri State	69
SE Missouri State	74

- Third Place - Stephen F. Austin 83, Tennessee–Martin 70

=== West - Bakersfield, California ===
Location: unknown Host: California State University, Bakersfield

Regional Semifinals; Round of 32; March 11
Chapman	80
San Francisco State	70
Cal State Bakersfield	72
Humboldt State	48

Regional Final; Sweet 16; March 12
Chapman	66
Cal State Bakersfield	78

- Third Place - San Francisco State 78, Humboldt State 71

=== Great Lakes - Owensboro, Kentucky ===
Location: Owensboro Sportscenter Host: Kentucky Wesleyan College

Regional Semifinals; Round of 32
Wright State	71
Lewis	57
Kentucky Wesleyan	90
Southern Connecticut	68

Regional Final; Sweet 16
Wright State	69
Kentucky Wesleyan	67

- Third Place - Lewis 91, Southern Connecticut 73

=== East - Bloomsburg, Pennsylvania ===
Location: Nelson Field House Host: Bloomsburg State College

Regional Semifinals; Round of 32; March 11
Bloomsburg	76
Cheyney	75
Philadelphia U	72
C. W. Post	68

Regional Final; Sweet 16; March 12
Bloomsburg	73
Philadelphia U	66

- Third Place - C. W. Post 83, Cheyney 69

*denotes each overtime played

== National Quarterfinals ==
Quarterfinal - New Britain, CT; Elite Eight; March 19
UDC	45
Sacred Heart	38

Quarterfinal - Sioux City, IA; Elite Eight; March 19
Morningside	91
Jacksonville State	90

Quarterfinal - Bloomsburg, PA; Elite Eight; March 19
Wright State	73
Bloomsburg	53

Quarterfinal - Bakersfield, CA; Elite Eight; March 19
SE Missouri State	70
Cal State Bakersfield	75

== National Finals - Springfield, Massachusetts ==
Location: Springfield Civic Center Hosts: American International College and Springfield College

National Semifinals; Final Four; March 25
UDC	92
Morningside	77
Cal State Bakersfield	50
Wright State	57

National Championship; March 26
UDC	73
Wright State	92

*denotes each overtime played

== All-tournament team ==
- Anthony Bias (Wright State)
- Michael Britt (District of Columbia)
- Earl Jones (District of Columbia)
- Gary Monroe (Wright State)
- Fred Moore (Wright State)

== See also ==
- 1983 NCAA Division I men's basketball tournament
- 1983 NCAA Division II women's basketball tournament
- 1983 NCAA Division III men's basketball tournament
- 1983 NAIA Basketball Tournament

== Sources ==
- 2010 NCAA Men's Basketball Championship Tournament Records and Statistics: Division II men's basketball Championship
- 1983 NCAA Division II men's basketball tournament jonfmorse.com
