= District of Columbia Firebirds =

- University: University of the District of Columbia
- NCAA: Division II
- Conference: ECC
- Athletic director: Patricia Thomas
- Location: Washington, DC
- Varsity teams: 10 (4 men's, 5 women's, 1 co-ed)
- Basketball arena: UDC Gymnasium
- Soccer stadium: UDC Field
- Aquatics center: UDC Natatorium
- Lacrosse stadium: UDC Field
- Tennis venue: UDC Tennis Facility
- Nickname: Firebirds
- Colors: Burgundy and gold
- Website: www.udcfirebirds.com

The District of Columbia Firebirds (also UDC Firebirds) are the athletic teams that represent the University of the District of Columbia, located in Washington, D.C., in NCAA Division II intercollegiate sports. The Firebirds compete as members of the East Coast Conference for all nine sports.

== Varsity teams ==
Men's sports (4)

- Basketball
- Lacrosse
- Tennis
- Soccer

Women's sports (5)

- Basketball
- Lacrosse
- Tennis
- Cross Country
- Track and field

== History ==
The Firebirds have experienced recent success in men's and women's tennis winning the East Coast Conference team titles their first season as a part of the conference; with the women's tennis team making it all the way to the "Sweet Sixteen" in the NCAA Division II tournament. The Firebirds also excelled on the hardwood in 2011–12 where both men's and women's basketball teams made it to the East Regional Quarterfinals in the 2012 NCAA Men's Division II Basketball Tournament. The university sponsored football in the past but discontinued the sport.

Pastorally, the Firebirds have excelled at intercollegiate athletics highlighted most notably by the men's basketball team winning the 1982 NCAA Men's Division II Basketball Tournament, under the tutelage of Coach Wil Jones. The Firebirds attempted and fell just short of repeating as champions but had to settle for runner-up in 1983.

=== Administration ===
Since December 2008, the athletic department has been headed up by Patricia Thomas, who is the university's first female African American to serve in this position. Thomas came to University of the District of Columbia with over 30 years of experience in intercollegiate athletics, including many years serving as a senior associate athletic director at Georgetown University, where she also served on the NCAA Division I Management Council.

The department also has five associate athletic directors, Joseph Lang (Compliance), Mike Riley (Internal Operations), Patrick Knapp (External Operations), Matthew Rienzo (Marketing & Communications), and Kendra Greene (Academics/ Senior Woman Administrator).

=== Notable coaches ===
Jeff Ruland (Iona College, 1991) was the coach of the Firebirds men's basketball team from 2009 to 2013. Ruland most notably is remembered for his years as a center in the National Basketball Association (NBA), where he played for the Washington Bullets and was an All-Star Selection in the 1982–83 season. Ruland came to The University of the District of Columbia from an assistant coaching position with the Philadelphia 76ers.
