= UIC Flames men's basketball statistical leaders =

The UIC Flames men's basketball statistical leaders are individual statistical leaders of the UIC Flames men's basketball program in various categories, including points, three-pointers, assists, blocks, rebounds, and steals. Within those areas, the lists identify single-game, single-season, and career leaders. The Flames represent the University of Illinois Chicago in the NCAA Division I Missouri Valley Conference.

UIC began competing in intercollegiate basketball in 1947. However, the school's record book does not generally list records from before the 1950s, as records from before this period are often incomplete and inconsistent. Since scoring was much lower in this era, and teams played much fewer games during a typical season, it is likely that few or no players from this era would appear on these lists anyway.

The NCAA did not officially record assists as a stat until the 1983–84 season, and blocks and steals until the 1985–86 season, but UIC's record books includes players in these stats before these seasons. These lists are updated through the end of the 2020–21 season.

== Scoring ==
Career
Rk	Player	Points	Seasons
1	Cedrick Banks	2,097	2001–02 2002–03 2003–04 2004–05
2	Kenny Williams	2,025	1990–91 1991–92 1992–93 1993–94
3	Sherell Ford	2,012	1992–93 1993–94 1994–95
4	Josh Mayo	1,718	2005–06 2006–07 2007–08 2008–09
5	Chuck Lambert	1,651	1971–72 1972–73 1973–74 1974–75
6	Tarkus Ferguson	1,646	2016–17 2017–18 2018–19 2019–20
7	Greg Olsen	1,629	1967–68 1968–69 1969–70 1970–71
8	Robo Kreps	1,594	2007–08 2008–09 2009–10 2010–11
9	Marcus Ottey	1,579	2016–17 2017–18 2018–19 2019–20
10	Brian Hill	1,578	1988–89 1989–90 1990–91 1991–92

Season
Rk	Player	Points	Season
1	Sherell Ford	707	1994–95
2	Sherell Ford	704	1993–94
3	Kenny Williams	695	1992–93
4	Bobby Locke	675	1986–87
5	Kenny Williams	624	1993–94
6	Sherell Ford	601	1992–93
7	Dikembe Dixson	594	2015–16
8	Cedrick Banks	589	2003–04
9	Josh Mayo	564	2007–08
10	Cedrick Banks	541	2004–05

Single game
Rk	Player	Points	Season	Opponent
1	Chuck Lambert	43	1973–74	Trinity Christian
2	Dikembe Dixson	40	2015–16	Youngstown State
3	Cedrick Banks	39	2004–05	Wright St.
4	Varis Purkilatis	38	1956–57	George Williams
	Kelsey Barlow	38	2013–14	Wagner
6	Sherell Ford	37	1994–95	Wright St.
	Mark Miller	37	1997–98	Milwaukee
8	George Demos	36	1969–70	George Williams
	Greg Olsen	36	1967–68	St. Procopius
	Kenny Williams	36	1992–93	Youngstown St.
	Kenny Williams	36	1993–94	Youngstown St.
	Sherell Ford	36	1994–95	Ga. Southern
	Sherell Ford	36	1994–95	Detroit
	Sherell Ford	36	1994–95	Xavier
	Cedrick Banks	36	2003–04	Green Bay

== Rebounds ==
Career
Rk	Player	Rebounds	Seasons
1	Chuck Lambert	1,181	1971–72 1972–73 1973–74 1974–75
2	Greg Olsen	971	1967–68 1968–69 1969–70 1970–71
3	Sherell Ford	807	1992–93 1993–94 1994–95
4	Derrick Johnson	778	1985–86 1986–87 1987–88 1988–89
5	Martin Finerty	748	1963–64 1964–65 1965–66 1966–67
6	Tai Odiase	745	2014–15 2015–16 2016–17 2017–18
7	Tarkus Ferguson	743	2016–17 2017–18 2018–19 2019–20
8	Armond Williams	710	2001–02 2002–03 2003–04 2004–05
9	Nate Chambers	708	1984–85 1985–86 1986–87 1987–88
10	Scott VanderMeer	703	2006–07 2007–08 2008–09

Season
Rk	Player	Rebounds	Season
1	Chuck Lambert	348	1972–73
2	Chuck Lambert	318	1974–75
3	Greg Olsen	291	1970–71
4	Sherell Ford	283	1994–95
5	Courtney James	282	1978–79
6	Ben Bennett	278	1961–62
7	Courtney James	277	1979–80
8	Othyus Jeffers	276	2006–07
	Scott VanderMeer	276	2008–09
10	Greg Olsen	270	1968–69
	Sherell Ford	270	1992–93

Single game
Rk	Player	Rebounds	Season	Opponent
1	Greg Olsen	25	1968–69	Chicago State
2	Greg Olsen	23	1969–70	Purdue Calumet
	Chuck Lambert	23	1974–75	Quincy
4	Chuck Lambert	21	1971–72	NE Illinois
	Scott VanderMeer	21	2007–08	Valparaiso
6	Greg Olsen	20	1969–70	Ferris State
	Chuck Lambert	20	1974–75	Mercy
	Martin Finerty	20	1966–67	St. Procopius
	Chuck Manson	20	1969–70	Purdue Calumet
10	Sherell Ford	18	1994–95	N. Illinois
	Maurice Brown	18	1999–00	Detroit

== Assists ==
Career
Rk	Player	Assists	Seasons
1	Craig Lathen	755	1981–82 1982–83 1983–84 1984–85
2	Martell Bailey	656	2001–02 2002–03 2003–04
3	Tarkus Ferguson	632	2016–17 2017–18 2018–19 2019–20
4	Kenny Williams	487	1990–91 1991–92 1992–93 1993–94
5	Spencer Stewart	420	2006–07 2007–08 2008–09 2009–10
6	Josh Mayo	371	2005–06 2006–07 2007–08 2008–09
7	Godwin Boahen	367	2016–17 2017–18 2018–19 2019–20
8	Willie Jett	336	1985–86 1986–87 1987–88
9	Bobby Locke	296	1985–86 1986–87
	Anthony Coomes	296	1996–97 1997–98

Season
Rk	Player	Assists	Season
1	Craig Lathen	274	1983–84
2	Martell Bailey	250	2003–04
3	Craig Lathen	244	1982–83
	Martell Bailey	244	2002–03
5	Craig Lathen	193	1981–82
6	Tarkus Ferguson	177	2016–17
7	Tony Freeman	172	1988–89
	Bobby Locke	172	1986–87
9	Tarkus Ferguson	166	2018–19
10	Willie Jett	162	1985–86
	Martell Bailey	162	2001–02

Single game
Rk	Player	Assists	Season	Opponent
1	Craig Lathen	17	1983–84	Cleveland St.
2	Craig Lathen	16	1983–84	E. Illinois
	Craig Lathen	16	1983–84	Alcorn State
4	Eddie Stacks	15	1977–78	Lewis
	Martell Bailey	15	2003–04	Evansville
6	Craig Lathen	14	1980–81	W. Illinois
	Craig Lathen	14	1982–83	SIU-Edwardsville
	Craig Lathen	14	1982–83	Ferris State
	Larry Frey	14	1967–68	Dominican
	Willie Jett	14	1985–86	Western Illinois
	Teyvion Kirk	14	2020–21	Valparaiso
	CJ Jones	14	2023–24	Drake

== Steals ==
Career
Rk	Player	Steals	Seasons
1	Kenny Williams	237	1990–91 1991–92 1992–93 1993–94
2	Brian Hill	209	1988–89 1989–90 1990–91 1991–92
3	Craig Lathen	184	1981–82 1982–83 1983–84 1984–85
4	Armond Williams	169	2001–02 2002–03 2003–04 2004–05
5	Tarkus Ferguson	165	2016–17 2017–18 2018–19 2019–20
6	Mark Miller	154	1995–96 1996–97 1997–98
7	Sherell Ford	148	1992–93 1993–94 1994–95
8	Cedrick Banks	146	2001–02 2002–03 2003–04 2004–05
	Robo Kreps	146	2007–08 2008–09 2009–10 2010–11
10	Godwin Boahen	145	2016–17 2017–18 2018–19 2019–20

Season
Rk	Player	Steals	Season
1	Craig Lathen	75	1982–83
2	Kenny Williams	73	1991–92
3	Brian Hill	72	1990–91
	Kenny Williams	72	1993–94
5	Eddie Stacks	70	1977–78
	Robert Johnson	70	1992–93
7	Bobby Locke	69	1986–87
8	Tony Freeman	67	1988–89
9	Chris Harris	66	1988–89
10	Craig Lathen	64	1983–84

Single game
Rk	Player	Steals	Season	Opponent
1	Brian Hill	8	1990–91	Illinois State
	Mark Miller	8	1995–96	Olivet Nazarene
	Theandre Kimbrough	8	1999–00	Illinois St.
4	Brian Hill	7	1990–91	Loyola
	Kenny Williams	7	1991–92	Cleveland St.
	Kenny Williams	7	1991–92	Wright State
	Robert Johnson	7	1992–93	N. Illinois
	Shawn Harlan	7	1994–95	Milwaukee
	Mark Miller	7	1997–98	Butler
	Ahmad Henderson II	7	2025–26	Oregon State

== Blocks ==
Career
Rk	Player	Blocks	Seasons
1	Tai Odiase	361	2014–15 2015–16 2016–17 2017–18
2	Scott VanderMeer	273	2006–07 2007–08 2008–09
3	Sherell Ford	164	1992–93 1993–94 1994–95
4	Dave Williams	154	1981–82 1982–83 1983–84
5	Derrick Johnson	146	1985–86 1986–87 1987–88 1988–89
6	Joe Scott	133	1999–00 2000–01 2001–02 2002–03 2003–04
7	Michael Diggins	111	2017–18 2018–19 2019–20 2020–21 2021–22
8	Tarkus Ferguson	106	2016–17 2017–18 2018–19 2019–20
9	Toby Okani	105	2022–23 2023–24
10	Nate Chambers	104	1984–85 1985–86 1986–87 1987–88

Season
Rk	Player	Blocks	Season
1	Tai Odiase	112	2017–18
2	Scott VanderMeer	111	2006–07
3	Tai Odiase	104	2016–17
4	Tai Odiase	97	2015–16
5	Scott VanderMeer	85	2007–08
6	Scott VanderMeer	77	2008–09
7	Dave Williams	67	1981–82
	Sherell Ford	67	1992–93
9	Toby Okani	66	2023–24
10	Derrick Johnson	56	1987–88

Single game
Rk	Player	Blocks	Season	Opponent
1	Sherell Ford	9	1993–94	Cleveland St.
	Scott VanderMeer	9	2006–07	Cleveland St.
	Tai Odiase	9	2015–16	Northern Kentucky
4	Nate Chambers	8	1986–87	Cleveland St.
	Scott VanderMeer	8	2008–09	Cleveland State
	Tai Odiase	8	2015–16	Green Bay
	Tai Odiase	8	2016–17	UTSA
	Tai Odiase	8	2016–17	Detroit Mercy
9	Dave Williams	7	1981–82	W. Illinois
	Sherell Ford	7	1992–93	NE Illinois
	Scott VanderMeer	7	2006–07	Fla. A&M
	Tai Odiase	7	2015–16	Wright State
	Tai Odiase	7	2015–16	Detroit Mercy
	Tai Odiase	7	2017–18	Parkside
	Toby Okani	7	2022–23	Illinois State
