= Kenny Williams (basketball, born 1972) =

American basketball player and announcer

Personal information
- Born: 1972 (age 53–54)
- Listed height: 5 ft 10 in (1.78 m)

Career information
- High school: Lyons Township (La Grange, Illinois)
- College: UIC (1990–1994)
- NBA draft: 1994: undrafted
- Playing career: 1997–2007
- Number: 11

Career history
- 1997: Trefl Sopot
- 1998: Porto
- 1998–1999: Trefl Sopot
- 1999: Gravelines
- 2000: Stargard
- 2000: SKK Szczecin
- 2001–2002: Doncel Distributel
- 2007: Cicero Cometas

Career highlights
- Polish League All-Star (1999); Summit League Player of the Year (1994); 3× First-team All-MCC (1992–1994); No. 11 retired by UIC Flames

Kendall Ovial Williams (born March /April 24, 1972) is an American former professional basketball player and announcer. He played for UIC Flames men's basketball from 1990 to 1994 in the Mid-Continent Conference (now Summit League), earning MCC Men's Basketball Player of the Year in 1994. He played high school basketball at Lyons Township High School. After college, he played in several international leagues, highlighted by a 1999 Polish Basketball League All-Star game appearance.

== High school ==
At Lyons High School, Kenny Williams played point guard. He shared the backcourt with John Hornacek, brother of Jeff Hornacek. His 1988–89 junior season Lyons team was mediocre (11-12, 4–6) on February 12. His senior season team commenced with a 9–1 start. He was a 1990 Chicagoland All-area selection by the Chicago Tribune, who received one third-place vote in the Illinois Mr. Basketball voting. He committed to the University of Illinois Chicago (UIC) in March 1990 after leading Lyons to the West Suburban Silver conference championship.

== College ==
On January 22, 1994, Williams became the all-time leading scorer at UIC, surpassing Chuck Lambert totals from his 1971–75 tenure with the team. He was the 1994 Summit League Men's Basketball Player of the Year as well as both a three-time All-Mid-Continent Conference (MCC, now Summit League) First Team selection and a three-time MCC All-Tournament selection (both 1992–1994). For each of his All-conference and All-conference tournament seasons, the Flames finished as runner up in the conference tournament and did not play in any postseason tournaments. Williams was the first UIC Flame to record 2000 career points (2,025) and is the All-time Flames leader in steals with 237. During his junior season, he was second in the MCC in scoring to Bill Edwards (25.2–21.7). As a senior he led the MCC in assists (4.6) and steals (2.5), while trailing only teammate Sherrell Ford in scoring (24.3–21.5). Williams represented UIC and the Summit League at the 1994 NCAA Slam Dunk competition. He was named MCC player of the week once as a sophomore (1/14/92) three times as a junior (1/26/93, 2/16/93, 2/23/93) and twice as a senior (11/28/93 and 2/20/94).

He was inducted into the Illinois Basketball Coaches Association Hall of Fame in April 1996 along with Kenny Battle, Rickey Green, and Sonny Parker to name a few. He became the third Flame (Ford and Mark Miller) to have his number retired on February 19, 2016.

== Professional career ==
After graduation, Williams tried out for the Chicago Rockers of the Continental Basketball Association, but a wrist injury hampered his 1994 training camp and he was released.

In 1997, Williams initially signed in Spain but later played two games with Trefl Sopot in Poland. He finished the 1997–98 season in Portugal with Porto. In December 1998, Williams re-joined Trefl Sopot and averaged 24.2 points in 22 games. In January 1999, he had a game with 54 points and 14 3-pointers, which set a Polish Basketball League record. In March 1999, he played in the Polish League All-Star Game.

Williams started the 1999–2000 season in France with Gravelines, playing in seven games. He returned to Poland in January 2000 and played one game for Stargard. Williams started the 2000–01 season in Poland with SKK Szczecin but left after six games. In April 2001, he joined Spanish team Doncel Distributel La Serena. He continued with Doncel Distributel in 2001–02.

In 2006, Williams was hired to coach in the American Basketball Association for the Chicago Rockstars.

In 2007, Williams was an inaugural member of the Cicero Cometas in the ABA, a team that played three games before withdrawing from the league.

== Post-playing career ==
In 2007, Williams became the Flames' radio analyst for the team's radio broadcasts.

== See also ==
- UIC Flames men's basketball statistical leaders
