= David Bailey (basketball) =

American basketball player (born 1981)

Personal information
- Born: March 3, 1981 (age 45) Chicago, Illinois, U.S.
- Listed height: 5 ft 8 in (1.73 m)
- Listed weight: 165 lb (75 kg)

Career information
- High school: Westinghouse (Chicago, Illinois)
- College: Loyola Chicago (1999–2003)
- NBA draft: 2003: undrafted
- Playing career: 2003–2012
- Position: Point guard
- Number: 13, 15

Career history
- 2003–2004: Idaho Stampede
- 2004: Šibenik
- 2004: Le Mans Sarthe
- 2004–2005: Sioux Falls Skyforce
- 2005–2006: Perth Wildcats
- 2006: BCM Gravelines
- 2006: Hyères-Toulon
- 2006–2007: Tartu Ülikool/Rock
- 2007: Dodge City Legend
- 2007–2008: Sioux Falls Skyforce
- 2008: PBG Basket Poznan
- 2008–2009: Fort Wayne Mad Ants
- 2009–2011: Sioux Falls Skyforce
- 2011–2012: Idaho Stampede

Career highlights
- CBA champion (2005); CBA Rookie of the Year (2004); CBA All-Rookie Team (2004); 2× First-team All-Horizon League (2001, 2002); Second-team All-Horizon League (2003)

David Bailey (born March 3, 1981) is an American professional basketball player. He is most notable for his time spent as point guard for the Loyola Ramblers men's basketball team from 1999 to 2003. He was a three-time All-Horizon League selection (two-time first team), a Horizon League scoring champion, a Horizon League assists champion and Horizon League All-Tournament team selection. He is the older brother of crosstown Horizon League foe and former George Westinghouse College Prep teammate Martell Bailey. The brothers' tenure in the league overlapped for two seasons, including one in which they were both All-League honorees. They played head-to-head several times, including a Horizon League men's basketball tournament championship game in which both were key performers.

== High school ==
As a 5-foot-4-inch (1.63 m), 135 pounds (61.2 kg) junior point guard, Bailey led Westinghouse to the quarterfinals of the Chicago Public School League championships. He missed a month of his senior season with a broken wrist, but was back in the lineup by mid January. As a senior, the team reached the semifinals. Following the season, David and junior teammate Cedrick Banks were first team All-Chicago Public School League and Martell was second team. As a 5-foot-8-inch (1.73 m) second team All-state selection, he signed with Loyola. He was also recruited by Rhode Island, Northern Illinois and Southwestern Louisiana. Loyola head coach Larry Farmer was advised to recruit Bailey by his former head coach John Wooden.

== College ==
Bailey began contributing in his first moments on the court at Loyola in 1999, and he is credited with saving a game as a freshman. Bailey had the ability to slam dunk the basketball. At Loyola, Bailey earned 2000–01 and 2001–02 first team All-Horizon League recognition and 2002–03 second team recognition (along with his brother who was also on the second team that season). He was also a 2001–02 All-Tournament Team selection.

Although the Bailey brothers played each other as Horizon League foes several times, the most notable was the 2002 Horizon League men's basketball tournament where the fifth-seeded Ramblers (17–12) and sixth-seeded Flames (19–13) opposed each other in the championship game for a 2002 NCAA Men's Division I Basketball Tournament invitation with the entire family in attendance. Although David made the All-Tournament team, younger brother Martell's team prevailed by one point in overtime, with Martell making a steal of a pass by David with 13 seconds remaining. David scored 35 points, while Martell only contributed 3 field goals, but all of Martell's field goals came in overtime, including one following the crucial steal. Nonetheless, the Chicago Tribune described David's gritty efforts on the season as heroic.

During his career, he was named Horizon League Player of the Week three times (January 22, 2001; November 26, 2001 and December 3, 2001). He was also a 2001–02 All-Tournament Team selection.

He led the Horizon League in assists in 2000–01 with 170 in 28 games for a 6.1 average and led the league in scoring the subsequent season with 651 points in 30 games for a 21.7 average. Bailey retired as the tenth leading scorer in Horizon League history in 2003 with 1933 points. This ranked him as the third-leading scorer in Loyola Ramblers history, and he retired as the Loyola leader in three point shots made. In his final career home game, he opposed his brother.

== Professional career ==
Bailey began his career in the Continental Basketball Association (CBA) with the Idaho Stampede during the 2003–04 season, where he was named the CBA Rookie of the Year. He won a CBA championship with the Sioux Falls Skyforce in 2005.

He played in the Ligue Nationale de Basketball (Pro A) for a few years including a year each with Le Mans Sarthe Basket, BCM Gravelines and Hyères-Toulon Var Basket. He has also played in the Korvpalli Meistriliiga (KML) in Estonia for Tartu Ülikool/Rock and in the NBA Development League for the Sioux Falls Skyforce, Fort Wayne Mad Ants and Idaho Stampede.

== Personal ==
Bailey's family included his mother, Linda Riley, his father, David Bailey, two older brothers and younger sister, Dakita.
