= 2001–02 Wright State Raiders men's basketball team =

American college basketball season

2001–02 Wright State Raiders men's basketball
- Conference: Horizon League
- Record: 17–11 (9–7 Horizon League)
- Head coach: Ed Schilling (5th season)
- Assistant coaches: Will Rey; Rod Foster; Clay Nunley
- Home arena: Nutter Center

2001–02 Horizon League men's basketball standings
	Conf.				Overall
Team	W		L	PCT	W		L	PCT
Butler	12	–	4	.750	26	–	6	.813
Detroit Mercy	11	–	5	.688	18	–	13	.581
Milwaukee	11	–	5	.688	16	–	13	.552
Wright State	9	–	7	.563	17	–	11	.607
Loyola–Chicago	9	–	7	.563	17	–	13	.567
UIC †	8	–	8	.500	20	–	14	.588
Cleveland State	6	–	10	.375	12	–	16	.429
Green Bay	4	–	12	.250	9	–	21	.300
Youngstown State	2	–	14	.125	5	–	23	.179
† 2002 Horizon League Tournament winner

The 2001–02 Wright State Raiders men's basketball team represented Wright State University in the 2001–02 NCAA Division I men's basketball season led by head coach Ed Schilling.

== Season summary ==
Following the 2000–01 season, Wright State lost several frontcourt players, including Bruno Petersons to graduation and Israel Sheinfeld to the professional ranks. For the 2001–02 season, the team added brothers Seth and Cain Doliboa to the active roster. Led by Vernard Hollins and Jesse Deister, the team finished with a 17–11 record and placed fourth in the Horizon League. Their season ended with a loss to Loyola in the conference tournament.

== Roster Changes ==
=== Joining ===
- Malcolm Andrews (G) recruited out of Western Hills High School in Cincinnati.

=== Leaving ===
- Marcus May left after the season concerned about diminished playing time.
- Israel Sheinfeld left to play professional Basketball.
- Ross McGreggor left the team in August after a redshirt season intending to no longer play college basketball.
- Michael Doles left at the end of October citing feeling homesick, although he also was struggling to meet the preseason conditioning running drill requirement.

== Roster ==
2001–02 Wright State Raiders men's basketball team
Players
Coaches

Pos.	#	Name	Height	Weight	Year	Previous school	Hometown
F	11	Cain Doliboa	6 ft 7 in (2.01 m)	200 lb (91 kg)	RS Sr	Springboro	Springboro, OH
G	33	Jesse Deister	6 ft 3 in (1.91 m)	205 lb (93 kg)	RS Sr	Olathe Christian	Topeka, KS
G	00	Vernard Hollins	6 ft 2 in (1.88 m)	200 lb (91 kg)	Jr	North Side	Ft. Wayne, IN
G	12	Tyson Freeman	5 ft 10 in (1.78 m)	183 lb (83 kg)	Jr	Scott	Toledo, OH
G	3	Joe Bills	6 ft 0 in (1.83 m)	180 lb (82 kg)	Jr	Rosecrans	Zanesville, OH
G	32	Josiah Martino	6 ft 1 in (1.85 m)	195 lb (88 kg)	Jr	Edwardsburg	Niles, MI
F	40	Thomas Hope	6 ft 8 in (2.03 m)	240 lb (109 kg)	Jr	Bluevale	Waterloo, Ontario
F	13	Braden Bushman	6 ft 4 in (1.93 m)	192 lb (87 kg)	So	Mississinewa	Gas City, IN
F	15	Seth Doliboa	6 ft 7 in (2.01 m)	210 lb (95 kg)	RS So	Springboro	Springboro, OH
G	14	Malcolm Andrews	5 ft 8 in (1.73 m)	150 lb (68 kg)	Fr	Western Hills	Cincinnati, OH
F	21	Mark Starkey (redshirt)	6 ft 6 in (1.98 m)	215 lb (98 kg)	Jr	Boardman	Youngstown, OH

Head coach

- Ed Schilling

Assistant coach(es)

Will Rey, Rod Foster, Clay Nunley

Legend

- (C) Team captain
- (S) Suspended
- (I) Ineligible
- (W) Walk-on
- Injured
- Current redshirt

== Schedule and results ==
Date time, TV	Rank^{#}	Opponent^{#}	Result	Record	Site city, state
Nov 17, 2001*		at St. Francis (PA)	W 83-67	1–0	DeGol Arena (1,357); Loretto, PA
Nov 20, 2001*		at Cincinnati	L 54-83	1–1	Myrl Shoemaker Center (11,507); Cincinnati, OH
Nov 24, 2001*		Fort Wayne	W 75-62	2-1	Nutter Center (4,241); Fairborn, OH
Nov 29, 2001*		Tennessee State	W 66-54	3-1	Nutter Center (4,117); Fairborn, OH
Dec 1, 2001*		at Miami Ohio	L 61-67	3–2	Millett Assembly Hall (3,860); Oxford, Ohio
Dec 5, 2001*		at Morehead State	L 72–80	3–3	Ellis T. Johnson Arena (1,830); Morehead, Kentucky
Dec 8, 2001*		at High Point	W 77–55	4–3	Millis Center (903); High Point, NC
Dec 11, 2001*		Oakland	W 74-54	5–3	Nutter Center (4,114); Fairborn, OH
Dec 15, 2001*		Santa Clara	W 76-62	6–3	Nutter Center (4,366); Fairborn, OH
Dec 20, 2001*		Prairie View A&M	W 94–61	7–3	Nutter Center (4,601); Fairborn, OH
Jan 1, 2002	No. 20	at Butler	W 90-87 ^{2OT}	8-3 (1–0)	Hinkle Fieldhouse (9,056); Indianapolis
Jan 5, 2002		at Youngstown State	L 80-87	8-4 (1–1)	Beeghly Center (2,498); Youngstown, OH
Jan 12, 2002		at Detroit Mercy	L 74–75 ^{OT}	8-5 (1–2)	Calihan Hall (2,421); Detroit, MI
Jan 14, 2002		at Cleveland State	W 68-64	9-5 (2–2)	CSU Convocation Center (2,822); Cleveland, OH
Jan 17, 2002		Milwaukee	L 80-86 ^{OT}	9-6 (2–3)	Nutter Center (4,501); Fairborn, OH
Jan 19, 2002		Green Bay	W 96-73	10-6 (3–3)	Nutter Center (4,498); Fairborn, OH
Jan 23, 2002*		Texas-Pan American	W 83-64	11–6	Nutter Center (4,163); Fairborn, OH
Jan 26, 2002		at Loyola	W 65-60	12-6 (4–3)	Gentile Event Center (3,619); Chicago, IL
Jan 28, 2002		at UIC	L 66-68	12-7 (4–4)	UIC Pavilion (2,147); Chicago, IL
Jan 31, 2002		Youngstown State	W 76-69	13-7 (5–4)	Nutter Center (4,552); Fairborn, OH
Feb 2, 2002		Butler	L 57-72	13–8 (5–5)	Nutter Center (7,740); Fairborn, OH
Feb 7, 2002		Cleveland State	W 87-72	14-8 (6–5)	Nutter Center (4,260); Fairborn, OH
Feb 9, 2002		Detroit Mercy	L 64–69	14-9 (6–6)	Nutter Center (5,568); Fairborn, OH
Feb 14, 2002		at Milwaukee	L 68-94	14-10 (3–4)	Klotsche Center (3,305); Milwaukee, WI
Feb 17, 2002		at Green Bay	W 71-70	15-10 (4–4)	Brown County Veterans Memorial Arena (2,992); Green Bay, WI
Feb 21, 2002		UIC	W 63-62	16-10 (5–4)	Nutter Center (4,301); Fairborn, OH
Feb 24, 2002		Loyola	W 80-74	17-10 (6–4)	Nutter Center (5,419); Fairborn, OH
Midwestern Collegiate Tournament
Mar 3, 2002	(4)	vs. (5) Loyola; Quarterfinals	L 64-90	17-11	CSU Convocation Center (3,556); Cleveland, OH
*Non-conference game. ^{#}Rankings from AP Poll. (#) Tournament seedings in parentheses. MW=Midwest.

== Awards and honors ==
Tyson Freeman	Raider Award
Cain Doliboa	Second Team All Horizon League
Seth Doliboa	Second Team All Horizon League
Cain Doliboa	Newcomer of the Year
Cain Doliboa	All Newcomer Team
Seth Doliboa	All Newcomer Team

== Statistics ==
Number	Name	Games	Average	Points	Assists	Rebounds
11	Cain Doliboa	28	16.8	470	47	141
15	Seth Doliboa	28	16.3	455	52	196
00	Vernard Hollins	27	15.1	408	116	128
33	Jesse Deister	28	14.2	397	62	80
3	Braden Bushman	28	3.5	98	39	54
40	Thomas Hope	28	3.0	85	43	142
13	Joe Bills	21	3.8	79	28	28
12	Tyson Freeman	25	2.2	55	8	15
14	Malcolm Andrews	24	0.7	17	13	14
