= Martell Bailey =

American basketball player

Personal information
- Born: June 9, 1982 (age 44)
- Listed height: 5 ft 10 in (1.78 m)
- Listed weight: 170 lb (77 kg)

Career information
- High school: George Westinghouse (Chicago, Illinois)
- College: UIC (2001–2004)
- NBA draft: 2004: undrafted
- Position: Point guard

Career highlights
- NCAA assists leader (2003); 2× Second-team All-Horizon League (2003, 2004); Horizon League All-Defensive Team (2004); Horizon League All-Newcomer Team (2002)

Martell Bailey (born June 9, 1982) is an American basketball player who is most notable for his time spent as point guard for the UIC Flames men's basketball team from 2001 to 2004. He was the 2002–03 NCAA Division I men's basketball season assists leader and holds the Horizon League records for single-season and career assists in conference games. He was a two-time second team All-Horizon League selection, and he led the Flames to three of the four post season tournaments they have ever participated in, including two of their three NCAA Division I men's basketball tournaments. Bailey's three seasons at UIC are the school's only consecutive 20-win seasons and culminated with a school record 24 wins. He was not accorded a fourth year of eligibility for academic reasons.

He is the younger brother of crosstown Horizon League foe and former George Westinghouse College Prep teammate David Bailey. The brothers' tenure in the league overlapped for two seasons, including one in which they were both All-League honorees. In head-to-head competition, Martell and the Flames defeated David and the Ramblers four out of five times, including a Horizon League men's basketball tournament championship game in which both were key performers.

As a high school basketball player, he was a three-time Chicago Tribune boys basketball Athlete of the Week who earned multiple All-State recognitions and led his high school basketball teams to a 132–3 record during his career. As a senior, he played for the first high school basketball team to achieve a sellout at the United Center. The team did so in the game in which they won the Chicago Public School League basketball tournament. During the season, the team had been ranked number one by USA Today. He was also a member of an Amateur Athletic Union junior national championship team.

== High school ==
Bailey played on freshman and sophomore teams that went a combined 70–0. Bailey was the leading scorer in the 1998 championship game of the Chicago Public School League sophomore team competition against Whitney M. Young Magnet High School.

As a junior, he moved up to the varsity team that was ranked 2nd in the city to King College Prep High School by the Chicago Sun-Times. It included his brother David who was a senior as well as juniors Cedrick Banks and Dennis Trammell. By December the team had a 6–0 record and had taken over the top spot in the rankings for the Chicago metropolitan area. That year, he earned his first Chicago Tribune boys basketball Athlete of the Week recognitions when he earned the MVP award in the 16-team December 1998 Chicago Public Schools Invitational for his 4-game efforts for the varsity team. The team reached the semifinals of the Chicago Public School League championships in 1999 with the two brothers starting and achieved a 31–1 record. Following the season, David and Banks were first team All-Chicago Public School League and Martell was second team. That summer, Martell and Banks were named to the Amateur Athletic Union All-American team during the national junior boys championships. The team won the national championships, but it included Westinghouse's starting five players, which violated the Illinois High School Association rule of a coach directing more than two of his players in a summer league.

After David graduated, with Martell, Banks and Trammell, Westinghouse began the season as the top ranked team in the city by the Chicago Sun-Times in mid-November. The team was ranked fifth in the nation according to some polls. As a result of the IHSA violation, it had to forfeit two of its three preseason weeks of practice, and coach Chris Head was suspended for November and December. Later that month, Bailey and Banks were selected as preseason Top 50 players by the Sun-Times. At the beginning of December, Bailey was selected to write a weekly diary for the Chicago Sun-Times. He hit the game-winning shot with 3.3 seconds left to cap a comeback from an 8-point deficit with 2:50 remaining against the nationally ranked number one team, Oak Hill Academy, during the December 1999 Coca-Cola; KMOX Shootout at the Kiel Center. Entering the game, Westinghouse was ranked number four in the nation by USA Today, but Oak Hill had not lost a game in two years. After following that upset by winning two tournaments, Westinghouse was moved up to the top of the national rankings. However, the team subsequently lost to the locally unranked Curie Metropolitan High School. Martell led Westinghouse to the 2000 Public School League finals and a runner-up finish in the 2000 Class AA Illinois State high school basketball championships, earning consecutive high school basketball Athlete of the Week and co-Athlete of the Week (with teammate Banks) recognitions by the Chicago Tribune. In the Public School League finals in which they defeated Whitney Young 82–60, Westinghouse became the first high school team to sell out the United Center with over 20,000 in attendance, surpassing the previous Public School League championship game attendance record of 12,000. He was a first team All-State selection by the Illinois Basketball Coaches Association (along with Banks) and had a 3.7 GPA The Chicago Sun-Times named Bailey and Banks to the Class AA All-State team that included Darius Miles, Eddy Curry, Dwyane Wade, T. J. Cummings, Roger Powell, Jr. and Jitim Young. Banks was selected as the Player of the Year and both were part of Chicago's team that defeated a team of New York City high school all-stars in the April 2000 Wendy's Shootout. Bailey, who was a second team All-State selection by some organizations, selected an offer to stay at home at University of Illinois at Chicago and compete in the conference with his brother over offers from Notre Dame and Texas-El Paso. He finished his high school career with a record of 132–3.

== College ==
At first, it appeared that Bailey had met his academic hurdles to play for UIC, although teammate Banks who also chose UIC did not. However, Bailey sat out the 2000–01 season for academic reasons. His enrollment classification was as an academic non-predictors.

During the season, Bailey he won the home contest against Wisconsin–Milwaukee with a buzzer beater. He earned 2001–02 Horizon League All-Newcomer Team recognition. As a sophomore in 2001–02, he split time at point guard. Although the Bailey brothers played each other as Horizon League foes several times, the most notable was the 2002 Horizon League men's basketball tournament where the fifth-seeded Ramblers (17–12) and sixth-seeded Flames (19–13) opposed each other in the championship game for a 2002 NCAA Division I men's basketball tournament invitation with the entire family in attendance at the Cleveland State Convocation Center. Although David made the All-Tournament team, younger brother Martell's team prevailed by one point in overtime, with Martell making a steal of a pass by David with 13 seconds remaining. David scored 35 points, while Martell only contributed 3 field goals, but all of Martell's field goals came in overtime, including one following the crucial steal. The win gave Martell's team a 2–1 edge in the season series (previously Loyola had prevailed on January 17 by 11 at its home arena, the Gentile Center, and UIC rebounded on February 16 with a 13-point victory at its UIC Pavilion). Then, the 15th-seeded Flames played the 2nd-seeded Oklahoma Sooners, losing by a 71–63 margin to a team led by Hollis Price and Aaron McGhee.

He was named Horizon League Player of the Week on December 2, 2002. Martell helped UIC sweep the season series against David's Loyola team with a January 22, 81–77 home victory and a February 27, 66–65 road victory. After finishing 20–14 in 2002, the team achieved consecutive 20 win seasons for the first time in 2003. The team qualified for the 2003 National Invitation Tournament where they opposed the Western Michigan Broncos and fell by a 63–62 margin. Bailey led all players in the game with four assists. He earned 2002–03 2nd team All-Horizon League recognition along with his brother. He was the Horizon League assists champion with 244 assists in 30 games for an 8.1 assist per game average, which led all of NCAA Division I. He established Horizon League single season assists record for Horizon League games during the 2002–03 with a total of 141.

Then the following season, he scored his career high on senior night with a 22-point performance during the 10th game of a winning streak against Butler on February 28, 2004. The team extended the streak to 12 consecutive games including the 2004 Horizon League men's basketball tournament championship game against undefeated (in conference) Wisconsin–Milwaukee to earn a bid in the 2004 NCAA Division I men's basketball tournament. In the tournament, the 13th-seeded Flames lost to the 4th seeded Kansas Jayhawks by a 78–53 margin. He repeated as a 2003–04 2nd team All-Horizon League selection. He also repeated as the Horizon League assists champion with 250 in 32 games for a 7.8 assist per game average, which ranked second the following season. He also earned Horizon League All-Defensive Team recognition. He established the Horizon League career assists record for Horizon League games over the course of his 2001–04 career with a total of 354.

In his three seasons, the Flames won 20, 21 and a school-record 24 games in consecutive seasons. His original enrollment classification had made him ineligible for his first season. The National Collegiate Athletic Association allows a non-predictor a fourth year of eligibility if he graduates in four years. However, Bailey was still pursuing his degree in Fall 2004. Thus, he was not granted a fourth year of eligibility and served the 2004–05 team as a student assistant coach. Although Bailey holds significant Horizon League records, he trails Craig Lathen, who played for UIC for four years when they were part of the Association of Mid-Continent Universities, which became the Mid-Continent Conference and is now known as The Summit League, in career (755–656), single-season (274–250) and single-game (17–15) assists.

== Personal ==
Bailey's family included his mother, Linda Riley, his father, David Bailey, two older brothers and younger sister, Dakita.

== See also ==
- List of NCAA Division I men's basketball season assists leaders
