= 2001–02 UIC Flames men's basketball team =

American college basketball season

2001–02 UIC Flames men's basketball

Horizon League tournament champions

NCAA tournament
- Conference: Horizon League
- Record: 20–14 (8–8 Horizon)
- Head coach: Jimmy Collins (6th season)
- Home arena: UIC Pavilion

2001–02 Horizon League men's basketball standings
	Conf.				Overall
Team	W		L	PCT	W		L	PCT
Butler	12	–	4	.750	26	–	6	.813
Detroit Mercy	11	–	5	.688	18	–	13	.581
Milwaukee	11	–	5	.688	16	–	13	.552
Wright State	9	–	7	.563	17	–	11	.607
Loyola–Chicago	9	–	7	.563	17	–	13	.567
UIC †	8	–	8	.500	20	–	14	.588
Cleveland State	6	–	10	.375	12	–	16	.429
Green Bay	4	–	12	.250	9	–	21	.300
Youngstown State	2	–	14	.125	5	–	23	.179
† 2002 Horizon League Tournament winner

The 2001–02 UIC Flames men's basketball team represented the University of Illinois at Chicago during the 2001–02 NCAA Division I men's basketball season. The Flames, led by head coach Jimmy Collins, played their home games at the UIC Pavilion in Chicago, Illinois as members of the Horizon League. UIC finished the conference regular season in sixth place at 8–8. They went on to win the Horizon League tournament, and received the conference's automatic bid to the NCAA tournament. Playing as No. 15 seed in the West region, UIC was beaten by No. 2 seed and eventual Final Four participant Oklahoma, 71–63, in the opening round.

== Roster ==
2001–02 UIC Flames men's basketball team
Players
Coaches

Pos.	#	Name	Height	Weight	Year	Hometown
G	3	Martell Bailey	5 ft 10 in (1.78 m)	170 lb (77 kg)	So	Chicago, Illinois
G	4	Jon-Pierre Mitchom	6 ft 2 in (1.88 m)	181 lb (82 kg)	Sr	St. Louis, Missouri
F	5	Kyle Kickert	6 ft 7 in (2.01 m)	265 lb (120 kg)	Jr	Palos Heights, Illinois
G	11	T. J. Mixson	6 ft 3 in (1.91 m)	182 lb (83 kg)	Sr	South Holland, Illinois
G	13	Jonathan Schneiderman	6 ft 1 in (1.85 m)	162 lb (73 kg)	Jr	Forreston, Illinois
G	20	Jordan Kardos	6 ft 2 in (1.88 m)	183 lb (83 kg)	Sr	Northbrook, Illinois
G	21	Cory Tibbs	6 ft 2 in (1.88 m)	179 lb (81 kg)	Jr	Chicago, Illinois
F	23	Cory Little	6 ft 5 in (1.96 m)	207 lb (94 kg)	Sr	Addison, Illinois
F	30	Armond Williams	6 ft 5 in (1.96 m)	205 lb (93 kg)	Fr	Hillside, Illinois
F	32	Aaron Carr	6 ft 4 in (1.93 m)	195 lb (88 kg)	So	Chicago, Illinois
	33	Tyrone Moten	—	169 lb (77 kg)	So	Chicago, Illinois
G	34	Cedrick Banks	6 ft 2 in (1.88 m)	170 lb (77 kg)	Fr	Chicago, Illinois
C	40	Jabari Harris	6 ft 10 in (2.08 m)	215 lb (98 kg)	So	Broadview, Illinois
F	42	Joe Scott	6 ft 10 in (2.08 m)	215 lb (98 kg)	Jr	Palos Hills, Illinois
F	44	Will Lewis	6 ft 4 in (1.93 m)	215 lb (98 kg)	Fr	Chicago, Illinois
C	50	Thor Solverson	6 ft 11 in (2.11 m)	243 lb (110 kg)	Sr	Lake Zurich, Illinois
	55	Terry Muse	—	175 lb (79 kg)	So	Waukegan, Illinois

Head coach

- Jimmy Collins (New Mexico State)

Assistant coach(es)

Legend

- (C) Team captain
- (S) Suspended
- (I) Ineligible
- (W) Walk-on
- Injured
- Current redshirt

Roster

== Schedule and results ==
Date time, TV	Rank^{#}	Opponent^{#}	Result	Record	Site (attendance) city, state
Regular season
Nov 18, 2001*		Indiana State	W 70–54	1–0	UIC Pavilion; Chicago, Illinois
Nov 21, 2001*		Saint Joseph's (IN)	W 96–53	2–0	UIC Pavilion; Chicago, Illinois
Nov 27, 2001*		Evansville	W 64–61	3–0	UIC Pavilion; Chicago, Illinois
Nov 29, 2001*		at Southern Illinois	L 68–76	3–1	SIU Arena; Carbondale, Illinois
Dec 1, 2001*		at Old Dominion	L 65–71	3–2	ODU Fieldhouse; Norfolk, Virginia
Dec 8, 2001*		North Central	W 93–53	4–2	UIC Pavilion; Chicago, Illinois
Dec 15, 2001*		Northern Illinois	W 86–69	5–2	UIC Pavilion; Chicago, Illinois
Dec 17, 2001*		at Purdue	L 73–80	5–3	Mackey Arena; West Lafayette, Indiana
Dec 20, 2001*		vs. Texas A&M; Las Vegas Classic	W 86–82	6–3	Valley High School; Las Vegas, Nevada
Dec 21, 2001*		vs. Missouri State; Las Vegas Classic	W 86–80	7–3	Valley High School; Las Vegas, Nevada
Dec 22, 2001*		vs. Mississippi State; Las Vegas Classic	L 74–77	7–4	Valley High School; Las Vegas, Nevada
Dec 28, 2001*		vs. Hofstra	W 79–71	8–4	Sun Dome; Tampa, Florida
Dec 29, 2001*		at South Florida	L 78–82	8–5	Sun Dome; Tampa, Florida
Jan 3, 2002		Detroit Mercy	W 62–61	9–5 (1–0)	UIC Pavilion; Chicago, Illinois
Jan 5, 2002		Cleveland State	L 69–83	9–6 (1–1)	UIC Pavilion; Chicago, Illinois
Jan 10, 2002		at Green Bay	W 75–66	10–6 (2–1)	Brown County Arena; Ashwaubenon, Wisconsin
Jan 12, 2002		at Milwaukee	L 49–75	10–7 (2–2)	Klotsche Center; Milwaukee, Wisconsin
Jan 17, 2002		at Loyola–Chicago	L 65–76	10–8 (2–3)	Joseph J. Gentile Center; Chicago, Illinois
Jan 19, 2002*		at Purdue-Fort Wayne	W 99–80	11–8	Hilliard Gates Sports Center; Fort Wayne, Indiana
Jan 21, 2002		Youngstown State	W 85–69	12–8 (3–3)	UIC Pavilion; Chicago, Illinois
Jan 26, 2002		Butler	L 73–82	12–9 (3–4)	UIC Pavilion; Chicago, Illinois
Jan 28, 2002		Wright State	W 68–66	13–9 (4–4)	UIC Pavilion; Chicago, Illinois
Jan 31, 2002		at Detroit Mercy	L 67–74	13–10 (4–5)	Calihan Hall; Detroit, Michigan
Feb 2, 2002		at Cleveland State	L 70–76	13–11 (4–6)	CSU Convocation Center; Cleveland, Ohio
Feb 4, 2002		at Youngstown State	W 63–57	14–11 (5–6)	Beeghly Center; Youngstown, Ohio
Feb 7, 2002		Milwaukee	W 73–71	15–11 (6–6)	UIC Pavilion; Chicago, Illinois
Feb 9, 2002		Green Bay	W 75–67	16–11 (7–6)	UIC Pavilion; Chicago, Illinois
Feb 16, 2002		Loyola–Chicago	W 76–63	17–11 (8–6)	UIC Pavilion; Chicago, Illinois
Feb 21, 2002		at Wright State	L 62–63	17–12 (8–7)	Ervin J. Nutter Center; Fairborn, Ohio
Feb 23, 2002		at Butler	L 61–85	17–13 (8–8)	Hinkle Fieldhouse; Indianapolis, Indiana
Horizon League tournament
Mar 2, 2002*	(6)	vs. (3) Milwaukee; Quarterfinals	W 75–63	18–13	CSU Convocation Center; Cleveland, Ohio
Mar 3, 2002*	(6)	vs. (2) Detroit Mercy; Semifinals	W 79–68	19–13	CSU Convocation Center; Cleveland, Ohio
Mar 5, 2002*	(6)	vs. (5) Loyola–Chicago; Championship game	W 76–75 ^{OT}	20–13	CSU Convocation Center; Cleveland, Ohio
NCAA tournament
Mar 15, 2002*	(15 W)	vs. (2 W) No. 3 Oklahoma; First round	L 63–71	20–14	American Airlines Center (19,200); Dallas, Texas
*Non-conference game. ^{#}Rankings from AP Poll. (#) Tournament seedings in parentheses. W=West. All times are in Central Time Zone.
