= 2001–02 Butler Bulldogs men's basketball team =

American college basketball season

2001–02 Butler Bulldogs men's basketball
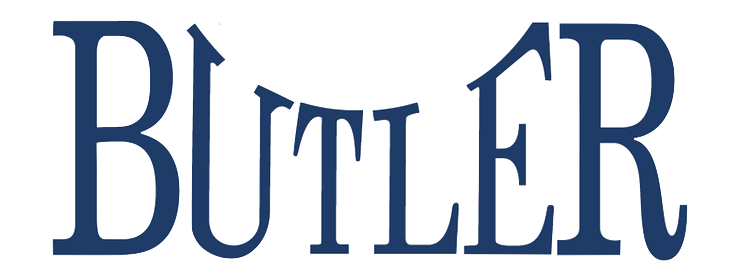

Top of the World Classic Champions Horizon League Regular Season Champions

NIT, Second Round
- Conference: Horizon League
- Record: 26–6 (12–4 Horizon)
- Head coach: Todd Lickliter (1st season)
- Assistant coaches: Matthew Graves (1st season); Jeff Meyer (1st season); Brad Stevens (1st season)

2001–02 Horizon League men's basketball standings
	Conf.				Overall
Team	W		L	PCT	W		L	PCT
Butler	12	–	4	.750	26	–	6	.813
Detroit Mercy	11	–	5	.688	18	–	13	.581
Milwaukee	11	–	5	.688	16	–	13	.552
Wright State	9	–	7	.563	17	–	11	.607
Loyola–Chicago	9	–	7	.563	17	–	13	.567
UIC †	8	–	8	.500	20	–	14	.588
Cleveland State	6	–	10	.375	12	–	16	.429
Green Bay	4	–	12	.250	9	–	21	.300
Youngstown State	2	–	14	.125	5	–	23	.179
† 2002 Horizon League Tournament winner

The 2001–02 Butler Bulldogs men's basketball team represented Butler University in the 2001–02 NCAA Division I men's basketball season. Their head coach was Todd Lickliter, serving in his first season as head coach at the school. The Bulldogs played their home games at Hinkle Fieldhouse as members of the Horizon League. Butler finished first in the Horizon League season standings but lost in the quarterfinals of the Horizon League Tournament. The Bulldogs received an invitation to the 2002 National Invitation Tournament where they defeated Bowling Green in the first round before falling to Syracuse in the second round. Butler finished the season with a record of 26–6 (12–4 Horizon).

== Roster ==
2001–02 Butler Bulldogs men's basketball team
Players
Coaches

Pos.	#	Name	Height	Weight	Year	Hometown
G	5	Thomas Jackson	5 ft 11 in (1.8 m)	165 lb (75 kg)	Sr	East Lansing, MI
F	42	Rylan Hainje	6 ft 6 in (1.98 m)	235 lb (107 kg)	Sr	Indianapolis, IN
C	40	Scott Robisch	6 ft 11 in (2.11 m)	235 lb (107 kg)	Sr	Springfield, IL
G	4	Brandon Miller	6 ft 0 in (1.83 m)	170 lb (77 kg)	RS Jr	New Castle, IN
F	33	Joel Cornette	6 ft 10 in (2.08 m)	230 lb (104 kg)	Jr	Cincinnati, OH
G	10	Darnell Archey	6 ft 1 in (1.85 m)	160 lb (73 kg)	Jr	New Castle, IN
F	23	Rob Walls	6 ft 5 in (1.96 m)	205 lb (93 kg)	Jr	Aurora, IL
F	51	Lewis Curry	6 ft 7 in (2.01 m)	230 lb (104 kg)	Jr	Fort Wayne, IN
C	55	Mike Moore	6 ft 10 in (2.08 m)	220 lb (100 kg)	Jr	Fairborn, OH
G	22	Mike Monserez	6 ft 6 in (1.98 m)	235 lb (107 kg)	RS So	Cincinnati, OH
F	1	Duane Lightfoot	6 ft 5 in (1.96 m)	220 lb (100 kg)	So	Louisville, KY
G	30	Nick Gardner	6 ft 4 in (1.93 m)	215 lb (98 kg)	So	Indianapolis, IN
C	13	Ben Grunst	7 ft 0 in (2.13 m)	300 lb (136 kg)	So	Milwaukee, WI
G	34	Ryan Reynolds	5 ft 10 in (1.78 m)	170 lb (77 kg)	So	Terre Haute, IN

Head coach

- Todd Lickliter (Butler)

Assistant coach(es)

- Matthew Graves (Butler)
- Jeff Meyer (Taylor)
- Brad Stevens (DePauw)

Legend

- (C) Team captain
- (S) Suspended
- (I) Ineligible
- (W) Walk-on
- Injured
- Current redshirt

Roster

== Schedule and results ==
Date time, TV	Rank^{#}	Opponent^{#}	Result	Record	Site city, state
Non-conference regular season
November 16, 2001*		vs. Radford; Top of the World Classic	W 73–56	1–0	Carlson Center (3,342); Fairbanks, Alaska
November 17, 2001*		vs. Delaware; Top of the World Classic	W 76–59	2–0	Carlson Center (3,333); Fairbanks, Alaska
November 18, 2001*		vs. Washington; Top of the World Classic	W 67–64	3–0	Carlson Center (3,159); Fairbanks, Alaska
November 25, 2001*		Indiana State	W 69–49	4–0	Hinkle Fieldhouse (5,670); Indianapolis, Indiana
November 27, 2001*		at Purdue	W 74–68	5–0	Mackey Arena (13,436); West Lafayette, Indiana
December 1, 2001*		Birmingham-Southern	W 70–34	6–0	Hinkle Fieldhouse (4,211); Indianapolis, Indiana
December 3, 2001*		at Lipscomb	W 76–56	7–0	Allen Arena (1,200); Nashville, Tennessee
December 8, 2001*		Evansville	W 101–65	8–0	Hinkle Fieldhouse (6,716); Indianapolis, Indiana
December 15, 2001*		Northern Iowa	W 77–65	9–0	Hinkle Fieldhouse (5,273); Indianapolis, Indiana
December 17, 2001*		at Mount St. Mary's	W 66–46	10–0	Knott Arena (1,021); Emmitsburg, Maryland
December 19, 2001*		at No. 21 Ball State	W 75–66	11–0	Worthen Arena (11,500); Muncie, Indiana
December 28, 2001*	No. 23	vs. Samford; Hoosier Classic	W 45–37	12–0	Conseco Fieldhouse (10,432); Indianapolis, Indiana
December 29, 2001*	No. 23	vs. Indiana; Hoosier Classic	W 66–64	13–0	Conseco Fieldhouse (16,471); Indianapolis, Indiana
Horizon League regular season
January 2, 2002	No. 20	Wright State	L 87–90 ^{2OT}	13–1 (0–1)	Hinkle Fieldhouse (9,056); Indianapolis, Indiana
January 7, 2002	No. 24	at Cleveland State	W 62–45	14–1 (1–1)	Goodman Arena (2,537); Cleveland, Ohio
January 10, 2002	No. 24	at Detroit Mercy	L 54–63	14–2 (1–2)	Calihan Hall (3,036); Detroit, Michigan
January 12, 2002	No. 24	at Youngstown State	W 68–50	15–2 (2–2)	Beeghly Center (3,566); Youngstown, Ohio
January 17, 2002		Green Bay	W 64–41	16–2 (3–2)	Hinkle Fieldhouse (4,895); Indianapolis, Indiana
January 19, 2002		Milwaukee	L 72–73	16–3 (3–3)	Hinkle Fieldhouse (6,890); Indianapolis, Indiana
January 23, 2002		Loyola Chicago	W 78–48	17–3 (4–3)	Hinkle Fieldhouse (4,577); Indianapolis, Indiana
January 26, 2002		at UIC	W 82–73	18–3 (5–3)	UIC Pavilion (5,002); Chicago, Illinois
January 30, 2002		at Milwaukee	W 59–58	19–3 (6–3)	U.S. Cellular Arena (5,015); Milwaukee, Wisconsin
February 2, 2002		at Wright State	W 72–57	20–3 (7–3)	Nutter Center (7,740); Fairborn, Ohio
February 7, 2002		Detroit Mercy	W 61–48	21–3 (8–3)	Hinkle Fieldhouse (6,007); Indianapolis, Indiana
February 9, 2002		Cleveland State	W 70–45	22–3 (9–3)	Hinkle Fieldhouse (6,311); Indianapolis, Indiana
February 14, 2002		at Green Bay	W 77–74	23–3 (10–3)	Brown County Arena (2,860); Ashwaubenon, Wisconsin
February 16, 2002		Youngstown State	W 75–50	24–3 (11–3)	Hinkle Fieldhouse (7,041); Indianapolis, Indiana
February 20, 2002		at Loyola Chicago	L 56–60	24–4 (11–4)	Joseph J. Gentile Arena (4,125); Chicago, Illinois
February 23, 2002		UIC	W 85–61	25–4 (12–4)	Hinkle Fieldhouse (8,853); Indianapolis, Indiana
Horizon League tournament
March 2, 2002	(1)	vs. (8) Green Bay; Quarterfinals	L 48–49	25–5	Goodman Arena (3,556); Cleveland, Ohio
NIT
March 14, 2002*		Bowling Green; First Round	W 81–69	26–5	Hinkle Fieldhouse (5,205); Indianapolis, Indiana
March 18, 2002*		at Syracuse; Second Round	L 55–66 ^{OT}	26–6	Carrier Dome (5,904); Syracuse, New York
*Non-conference game. ^{#}Rankings from AP poll. (#) Tournament seedings in parentheses. All times are in Eastern Time.
