= Mark Miller (basketball) =

American basketball player and coach

Personal information
- Born: September 15, 1975 (age 50) Chicago, Illinois, U.S.
- Listed height: 6 ft 2 in (1.88 m)
- Listed weight: 185 lb (84 kg)

Career information
- High school: Westinghouse (Chicago, Illinois)
- College: UIC (1995–1998)
- NBA draft: 1998: undrafted
- Playing career: 1998–2005
- Position: Shooting guard

Career history
- 1998–1999: KK Split
- 1999–2000: Fenerbahçe
- 2000–2001: Telekom Baskets Bonn
- 2001–2002: Paris Basket Racing
- 2002: Olympia Larissa
- 2002–2003: Limoges CSP
- 2004–2005: Asseco Prokom Gdynia

Career highlights
- MCC Player of the Year (1998); First team All-MCC (1998); No. 12 retired by UIC Flames

Mark Miller (born September 15, 1975) is a retired American basketball player and current assistant coach for Robert Morris University in Chicago. He was a standout college player for the University of Illinois at Chicago (UIC) and played professionally in six countries before starting his coaching career.

== High school and college career ==
Miller was a high school standout for George Westinghouse College Prep, earning first team Chicago Public League honors and winning a city title in 1994. A 6'2" guard, Miller went to hometown UIC to play for coach Bob Hallberg.

He became one of the best players in school history, earning second team All-Midwestern Collegiate Conference as both a freshman and sophomore. As a junior in 1997–98, Miller averaged 19.7 points and 5.4 rebounds per game and was named first team All-MCC and MCC Player of the Year. Miller led the Flames to the first NCAA tournament appearance in the school's history that season.

For his career, Miller scored 1,458 points. He was elected to the UIC athletic Hall of Fame in 2003 and is only one of three Flames to have their jersey retired by the school (along with Sherell Ford and Kenny Williams).

== Professional career ==
Following his junior season at UIC, Miller declared his eligibility for the 1998 NBA draft, however he was not selected. Instead, Miller headed to Europe where he played a season each in Croatia (KK Split) and Turkey (Fenerbahçe).

He then joined Telekom Baskets Bonn in Germany's Basketball Bundesliga for 2000–01. There he averaged 17.5 points, 3.2 rebounds and 4.7 assists per game.

Miller then played in Greece (G.S. Olympia Larissa B.C.) and France (Paris Basket Racing and Limoges), and played his last professional season with Asseco Prokom Gdynia in 2004–05.

== Coaching career ==
On August 19, 2009 Miller joined the UIC coaching staff as an assistant to his former coach, Jimmy Collins. He remained on the Flames' staff for the 2009–10 season, until Collins' retirement in 2010. He then joined the coaching staff at Robert Morris University, where he still serves as an assistant coach.
