= Jimmy Collins (basketball) =

American basketball player and coach (1946–2020)

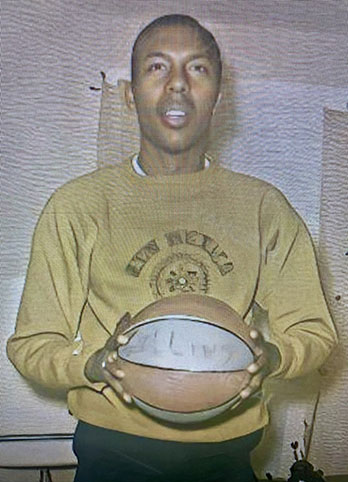

Personal information
- Born: November 24, 1946 Syracuse, New York, U.S.
- Died: December 13, 2020 (aged 74) Chicago, Illinois, U.S.
- Listed height: 6 ft 2 in (1.88 m)
- Listed weight: 210 lb (95 kg)

Career information
- High school: Corcoran (Syracuse, New York)
- College: New Mexico State (1967–1970)
- NBA draft: 1970: 1st round, 11th overall pick
- Playing career: 1970–1972
- Position: Shooting guard
- Number: 22
- Coaching career: 1973–2010

Career history

Playing
- 1970–1972: Chicago Bulls

Coaching
- 1973–1974: New Mexico State (GA)
- 1980–1983: St. Thomas Elementary
- 1983–1996: Illinois (assistant)
- 1996–2010: UIC

Career highlights
- As player: Consensus second-team All-American (1970); As head coach: 2× Horizon League tournament champion (2002, 2004); Horizon League regular season champion (1998); Horizon League Coach of the Year (1997)
- Stats at NBA.com
- Stats at Basketball Reference

James Earl Collins (November 24, 1946 – December 13, 2020) was an American basketball player and coach. He was born and raised in Syracuse, New York, where he attended Corcoran High School. Collins was the head coach of the UIC Flames from 1996 to 2010, becoming the program's all-time winningest coach and leading UIC to its first-ever postseason appearances - NCAA tournament appearances in 1998, 2002 and 2004, and an NIT showing in 2003.

He was the father of the writer Brandi Collins-Dexter.

== Early life and playing career ==
Born and raised in Syracuse, New York, son of Early Collins, who was a funeral director, and to Lorraine Collins née Varnarsdale, who worked in the nursing field. Jimmy Collins graduated from Corcoran High School and played college basketball for the New Mexico State Aggies under head coach Lou Henson. As a senior, Collins was the captain of an Aggie squad that reached the 1970 Final Four.

Collins was then drafted in the first round of the 1970 NBA draft by the Chicago Bulls.

== Coaching career ==
Collins began his coaching career with one and a half years as a graduate assistant at New Mexico State after retiring from professional basketball. In 1976, Collins returned to Chicago to start a trucking business. From 1977 to 1983, Collins was a probation officer for Cook County, Illinois. Collins also returned to coaching in 1980 as volunteer head coach at St. Thomas Elementary School in Chicago.

From 1983 to 1996, Collins was an assistant at the University of Illinois at Urbana-Champaign (Illinois) under Lou Henson. There he had made a name for himself as one of the nation's best recruiters, helping lure Chicago area players such as Kendall Gill, Nick Anderson, Deon Thomas and the bulk of the Fighting Illini's 1989 Final Four team.

In 1996, Collins became head coach at the University of Illinois at Chicago (UIC). In 14 seasons, Collins had a 218–208 record, including three NCAA Tournament appearances in 1998, 2002, and 2004. On July 20, 2010, Collins announced his retirement from coaching.

Collins died on December 13, 2020, at age 74.

== Career statistics ==
Legend
GP	Games played	GS	Games started	MPG	Minutes per game
FG%	Field goal percentage	3P%	3-point field goal percentage	FT%	Free throw percentage
RPG	Rebounds per game	APG	Assists per game	SPG	Steals per game
BPG	Blocks per game	PPG	Points per game	**Bold**	Career high

=== NBA ===
==== Regular season ====
Year	Team	GP	GS	MPG	FG%	FT%	RPG	APG	PPG
1970–71	Chicago	**55**	**3**	**8.7**	**.430**	.778	**1.0**	**1.1**	**4.0**
1971–72	Chicago	19	0	7.1	.366	**.909**	.6	.5	3.3
Career		74	3	8.3	.414	.804	.9	.9	3.8

==== Playoffs ====
Year	Team	GP	MPG	FG%	FT%	RPG	APG	PPG
1971	Chicago	2	4.0	.000	1.000	.5	.0	1.5

== Head coaching record ==
Record table
Season	Team	Overall	Conference	Standing	Postseason
**UIC Flames** (Horizon League) (1996–2010)
1996–97	UIC	15–14	11–5	T–6th	
1997–98	UIC	22–6	12–2	T–1st	NCAA Division I first round
1998–99	UIC	7–21	2–12	8th	
1999–00	UIC	11–20	5–9	7th	
2000–01	UIC	11–17	5–9	6th	
2001–02	UIC	20–14	8–8	6th	NCAA Division I first round
2002–03	UIC	21–9	12–4	3rd	NIT first round
2003–04	UIC	24–8	12–4	2nd	NCAA Division I first round
2004–05	UIC	15–14	8–8	T–4th	
2005–06	UIC	16–15	8–8	T–3rd	
2006–07	UIC	14–18	7–9	T–4th	
2007–08	UIC	18–15	9–9	T–4th	
2008–09	UIC	16–15	7–11	T–6th	
2009–10	UIC	8–22	3–15	9th	
UIC:		218–208 (.512)	109–113 (.491)		
Total:		218–208 (.512)			
National champion Postseason invitational champion Conference regular season champion Conference regular season and conference tournament champion Division regular season champion Division regular season and conference tournament champion Conference tournament champion
