= Brandi Collins-Dexter =

American writer and academic (died 2025)

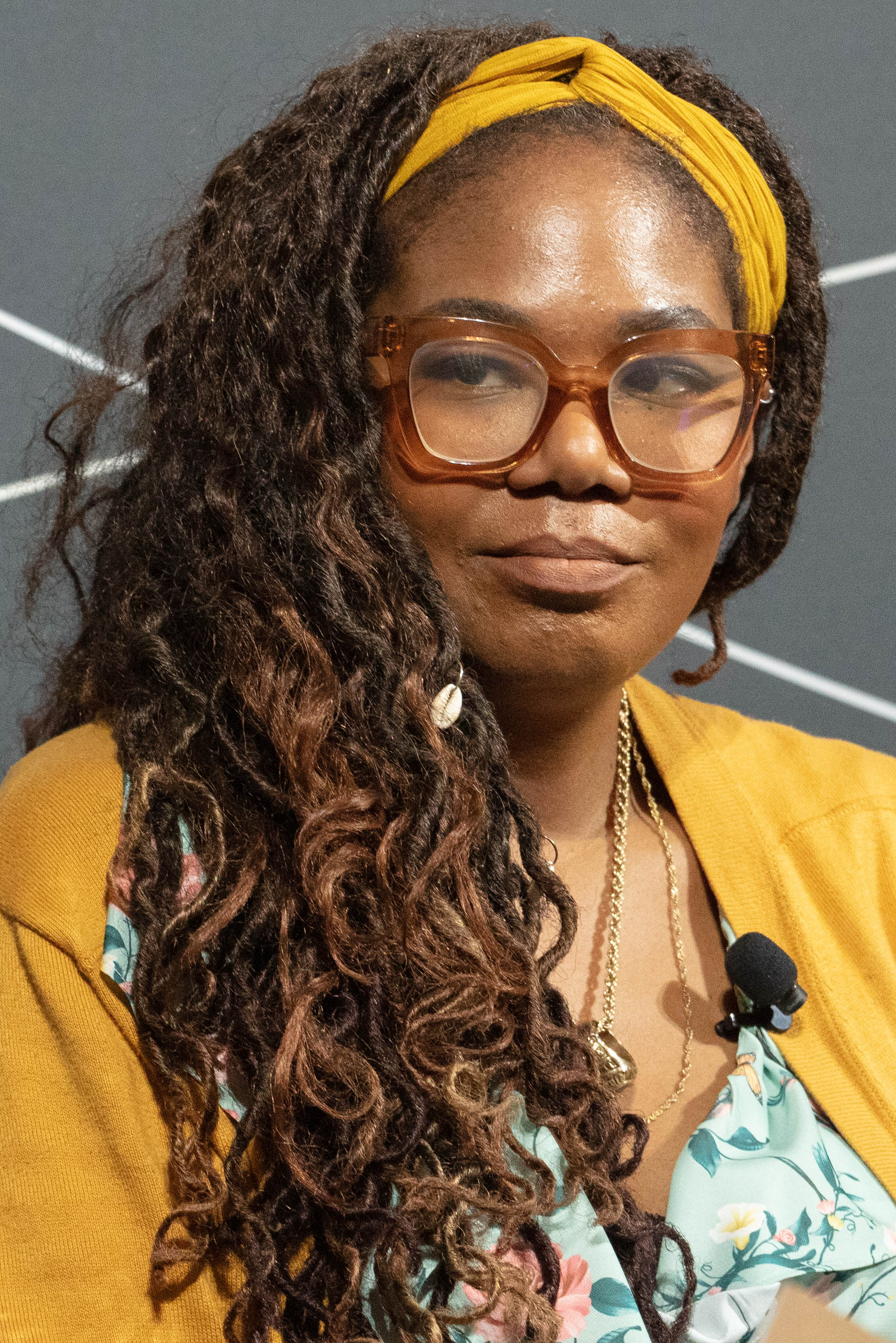
- Collins-Dexter in 2022
- Died: June 25, 2025 (aged 44)

Academic background
- Education: Agnes Scott College (BA); University of Wisconsin-Madison (JD)

Brandi Collins-Dexter (died June 25, 2025) was an American writer, researcher and policy advocate. She was the author of Black Skinhead: Reflections on Blackness and Our Political Future and the daughter of Jimmy Collins, the American basketball player and coach. She was a visiting fellow at the Shorenstein Center on Media, Politics and Public Policy of Harvard Kennedy School. The Hill named her a "person to watch" in 2017 and The Root named her one of The Most Influential African Americans in 2019. In 2020, she was awarded the Champions of Freedom Award by the Electronic Privacy Information Center.

== Career ==
Collins-Dexter held a B.A. in history from Agnes Scott College, and a J.D. from University of Wisconsin-Madison Law School. In the early 2000s, she lived in London, UK for a couple years. She worked at MediaJustice and Safer Foundation in Illinois. She was Senior Campaign Director of Media, Culture and Economic Justice at Color of Change. At Color of Change, she led a number of campaigns including getting The O’Reilly Factor off the air and getting R. Kelly dropped from RCA. She was also one of the leaders in getting Facebook to undergo a civil rights audit.

She testified in Congress on numerous occasions, including in front of the United States House Committee on Energy and Commerce on issues such as disinformation and consumer privacy. She wrote numerous articles on issues including cryptocurrency, retail theft, and surveillance, including in Essence and Wired. She was a Public Voices Fellow on Technology in the Public Interest from 2023-2024, an initiative of The OpEd Project funded by the MacArthur Foundation. In 2022, she published her debut essay collection Black Skinhead: Reflections on Blackness and Our Political Future.

== Personal life ==
Collins-Dexter was the daughter of former Chicago Bulls player and University of Illinois Chicago basketball coach Jimmy Collins.

On June 25, 2025, Collins-Dexter died of cancer, The United Church of Christ Media Justice Ministry announced plans to give her a posthumous award for work in public interest media.

She is survived by her mother Hettie L. Collins, husband David Dexter, her brother, Kenneth R. Collins, and sisters Erica M Collins and Semaj C. Douglas.

== Books ==
- Collins-Dexter, Brandi (2022). Black skinhead: reflections on Blackness and our political future. New York: Celadon Books. ISBN 9781250824110.
