= Tai Odiase =

American basketball player (born 1995)

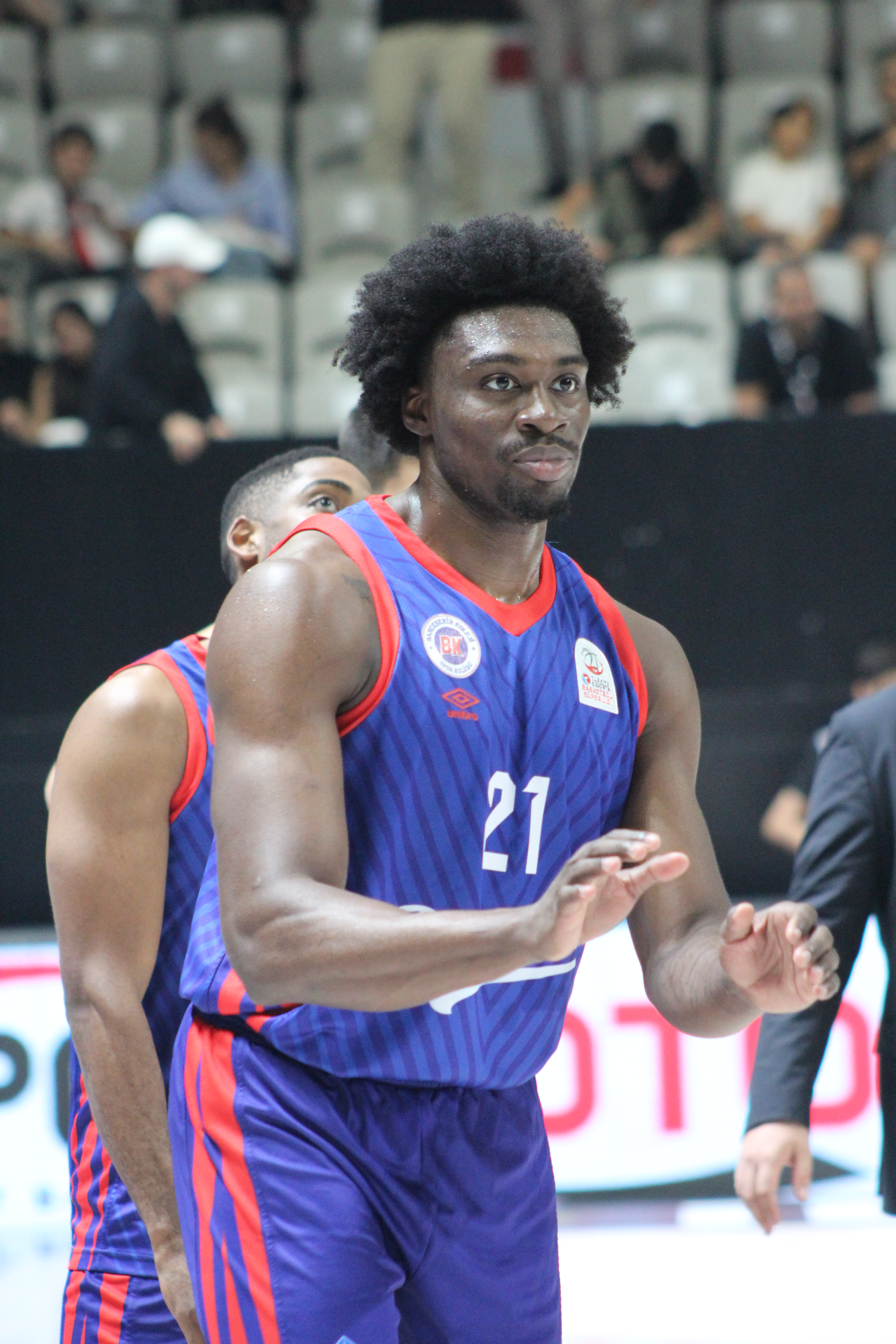
- Odiase with Bahçeşehir Koleji in 2024

No. 21 – Hapoel Tel Aviv
- Position: Center
- League: Israeli Premier League; EuroLeague

Personal information
- Born: September 21, 1995 (age 31) Glenwood, Illinois, U.S.
- Listed height: 6 ft 9 in (2.06 m)
- Listed weight: 240 lb (109 kg)

Career information
- High school: Homewood-Flossmoor (Flossmoor, Illinois)
- College: UIC (2014–2018)
- NBA draft: 2018: undrafted
- Playing career: 2018–present

Career history
- 2018: Iberostar Tenerife
- 2018–2019: Lavrio
- 2019–2020: Greensboro Swarm
- 2020–2021: BG Göttingen
- 2021–2022: EWE Baskets Oldenburg
- 2022–2023: Germani Basket Brescia
- 2023–2024: Prometey
- 2024–2025: Bahçeşehir Koleji
- 2025–present: Hapoel Tel Aviv

Career highlights
- All-Israeli Basketball Premier League First Team (2026); Latvian–Estonian Basketball League champion (2024); Italian Basketball Cup winner (2023); 2× Horizon League Defensive Player of the Year (2017, 2018); 3× Horizon League All-Defensive Team (2016–2018)

Tai Osazeeonamen Odiase (born September 21, 1995) is a Nigerian American and naturalized Puerto Rican professional basketball player for Hapoel Tel Aviv of the Israeli Premier League and the EuroLeague. He also plays for the Puerto Rico men's national basketball team.

He played four years of college basketball at UIC, with whom he was two-time Horizon League Defensive Player of the Year, three-time Horizon League All-Defensive Team, and second in the NCAA in his junior year in blocks-per-game. He was named 2026 All-Israeli Basketball Premier League First Team. Standing at 2.06 m (6 ft 9 in), he plays at the center position.

== High school career ==
Odiase played high school basketball at Homewood-Flossmoor High School in Flossmoor, Illinois. He was ranked as a top-25 senior in the state of Illinois and the fifth-best center. Odiase helped the Vikings claim a conference title during his junior season, and was named All-Conference. During his senior year, he averaged 17.4 points, 10.4 rebounds, and 3.1 blocks per game.

== College career ==
Odiase, a three-year captain, played 130 games at the University of Illinois Chicago for the UIC basketball team from 2014 to 2018. He started 117 times, including the first 102 under coach Steve McClain's leadership

As a freshman in 2014-15, he played 28 games and averaged 18.7 minutes, 4.4 points, 3.6 rebounds and 1.6 blocks (2nd) per game, while shooting 46.5% from the floor. As a sophomore in 2015-16, he played 30 games and averaged 27.8 minutes, 9.5 points, 6.4 rebounds (8th in the league) and 3.2 blocks (2nd in the league and in the NCAA) per game, while shooting 50.0% from the floor.

As a junior in 2016-17, he played 36 games and averaged 26.7 minutes, 11.4 points, 6.9 rebounds (5th in the league) and 2.8 blocks (leading the league and 5th in the NCAA) per game, while shooting 57.7% from the floor.

As a senior in 2017-18, he played 36 games and averaged 25.2 minutes, 9.3 points, 5.6 rebounds and 3.1 blocks (leading the league and 4th in the NCAA) per game, while shooting 56.8% from the floor.

The Glenwood, Illinois native was named the Horizon League Defensive Player of the Year as both a junior and senior, and was one of only three players in Horizon League history to be named to the conference's All-Defensive Team three times (2016-18). Following his senior season, Odiase earned a spot on the CollegeInsider.com Postseason Tournament All-Tournament Team, and was named UIC Male Athlete of the Year. Odiase is the all-time leader for both UIC and the Horizon League with 361 career blocks. That number placed him tied for 37th on the NCAA's all-time list.

== Professional career ==
=== Iberostar Tenerife ===
Odiase in 2021

After finishing his college career at UIC, Odiase joined Iberostar Tenerife of the Liga ACB until the end of the season. In six games he played a total of 46.1 minutes in which he scored 18 points on 9-for-16 shooting from the field, and had six rebounds and five blocks.

=== NBA Summer League ===
After going undrafted in the 2018 NBA draft, Odiase joined the Phoenix Suns in the 2018 NBA Summer League. He played four games, in which in a total of 32.2 minutes he scored six points, along with five rebounds and two assists.

=== Lavrio ===
Odiase joined Lavrio of the Greek Basket League thereafter. In 13 games in 2018-19, Odiase averaged 13.2 minutes, 3.7 points, and 3.2 rebounds per game, while shooting 50.0% from the floor.

=== Greensboro Swarm ===
In December 2019, Odiase was acquired by the Greensboro Swarm of the NBA G League. On February 24, 2020, he finished with 14 points, six rebounds and a block against the Long Island Nets. In 27 games in 2019-20, Odiase averaged 11.8 minutes, 4.9 points, 3.8 rebounds, and 1.3 blocks per game, while shooting 50.5% from the floor.

=== BG Göttingen ===
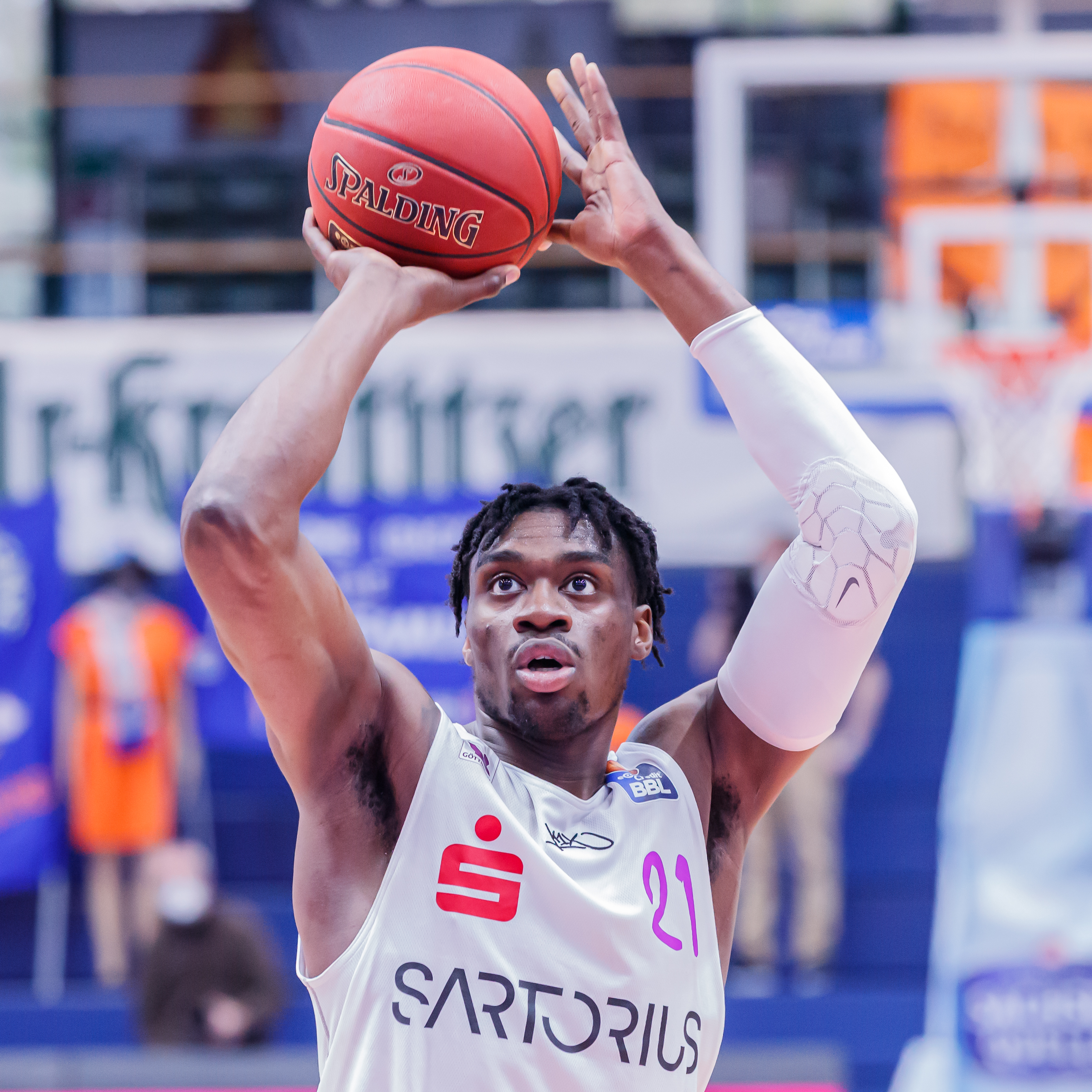
Odiase in 2021

On July 22, 2020, he signed with BG Göttingen of the Basketball Bundesliga. In 38 games in 2020-21, Odiase averaged 27.3 minutes, 13.4 points, 6.4 rebounds, and 1.6 blocks per game, while shooting 56.9% from the floor.

=== Baskets Oldenburg ===
On June 14, 2021, he signed with Baskets Oldenburg of the Basketball Bundesliga. In 37 games in 2021-22, Odiase averaged 23.4 minutes,10.8 points, 5.2 rebounds, and 1.4 blocks per game, while shooting 58.7% from the floor.

=== Germani Basket Brescia ===
On July 14, 2022, he signed with Germani Basket Brescia (later known as Maxima Roma) of the Lega Basket Serie A. Odiase helped lead the team to victory in the 2023 Italian Basketball Cup. In 52 games in 2022-23, Odiase averaged 20.6 minutes,7.9 points, 3.0 rebounds, and 1.1 blocks per game, while shooting 62.4% from the floor.

=== Prometey ===
On July 3, 2023, he signed with Prometey of the Latvian-Estonian Basketball League. He played 53 games for the team, and with it won the Latvian-Estonian Basketball League championship title in 2024.

=== Piratas de Quebradillas ===
In 2024, having signed with the team on April 30, he also played for Piratas de Quebradillas in the Baloncesto Superior Nacional. In 29 games, Odiase averaged 32.8 minutes,19.1 points, 6.8 rebounds, 1.3 assists, and 1.3 blocks (6th in the league) per game, while shooting 62.0% from the floor. (4th)

=== Bahçeşehir Basketball ===
Odiase in 2025

On June 20, 2024, he signed with Bahçeşehir Basketball of the Basketbol Süper Ligi (BSL). In 2024-25, in 59 games he averaged 23.7 minutes, 10.8 points, and 4.4 rebounds per game, shooting 62.4% from the floor.

=== Hapoel Tel Aviv ===
On June 23, 2025, he signed with Hapoel Tel Aviv of the Israeli Basketball Premier League. In 2025-26, in 55 games he averaged 16.3 minutes, 7.4 points, and 2.9 rebounds per game, shooting 68.6% from the floor. He was voted All-Israeli Basketball Premier League First Team, Eurobasket.com All-Israeli League Center of the Year, and named to the Eurobasket.com All-Israeli League First Team.

In July 2026, he re-signed with Hapoel Tel Aviv.

== National team ==
In August 2024, the Puerto Rican Basketball Federation (FBPUR) announced the naturalization of Odiase in order to him to be able to represent Puerto Rico on the Puerto Rico men's national basketball team on the world stage. He made his debut for the senior national team during the FIBA AmeriCup 2025 Qualifiers in February 2025.
