= Craig Lathen =

American basketball player

Personal information
- Listed height: 6 ft 1 in (1.85 m)

Career information
- High school: East Aurora (Aurora, Illinois)
- College: UIC (1981–1985)
- Position: Point guard

Career highlights
- NCAA assists leader (1984); MCC Player of the Year (1984); First-team All-MCC (1984); Second-team All-MCC (1983)

Craig "Cubby" Lathen is an American basketball player who is most notable for his time spent as point guard for the UIC Flames men's basketball team in the early 1980s. He was the 1983–84 NCAA Division I men's basketball season assists leader and earned The Summit League Men's Basketball Player of the Year back when The Summit League was known as the Association of Mid-Continent Universities (AMCU), which later became known as the Mid-Continent Conference. He holds the Summit League records for career and single-season assists per game. He holds the UIC records for career, single-season and single-game assists as well as single-season steals. During his junior season as a high school basketball player, his East Aurora High School team set the Illinois record for most single-season 100-point performances. In college, he helped his school post its all-time highest score with a 120-point night. Due to academic difficulties he only played nine games as a senior. His Summit League records are also abbreviated by the fact that his freshman season predated the conference.

== High school ==
In 1980, Lathen was a member of the East Aurora Tomcats team that set the Illinois High School record for most 100-point performances. Their 11th such performance, which occurred prior to February 16, set the record as they reached a 20–2 record. All-State performer Melvin Harden usually led the team in scoring that season. The team finished with a 25–3 record after losing to West Aurora High School in the Class AA Sectional Championships in overtime. Without Harden, Lathen led the team back to the Sectionals the following season with a 23–3 record. He was an All-State honoree. Following the season, he signed with UIC. Lathen was listed at 6-foot-1-inch (1.85 m) when he signed.

== College ==
When UIC posted a school record 120 points on November 29, 1983 against Chadron State, Lathen had 15 points and 13 assists. Later that season, UIC would win 12 games in a row heading into the conference tournament. He made the 1984 conference All-Tournament Team.

He dropped out of UIC in the fall of 1984 and entered Triton Community College in order to make up some academic work. After leading the nation in assists as a junior, Lathen was not academically eligible to start his senior season. Lathen returned to the team in January. Initially, Lathen was benched for what were termed "Disciplinary reasons" at the beginning of February. After becoming eligible to play in the middle of the season, he played nine games before running afoul of the teams academic standards and quitting the team for good.

Lathen formerly held all of the AMCU major assist records (career total, career per game, single-season total, single-season per game, and single-game). He continues to hold both the career per game and the single-season per game assists records for the conference. He tied the single-game assist record with 16 vs. Eastern Illinois on December 30, 1983 and broke the record with 17 vs. Cleveland State on January 24, 1984. This record stood until the current record of 19 was established on February 24, 1986 by Frank Nardi. As of 16 November 2011, no conference player has exceeded 16 in any other games. His 244 assists during the 1982–83 season set the conference single-season record, and he broke his own record the following season with 274. This total stood as the league record until the 2008–09 season when Johnathan Jones posted 290. In this season, he established the current conference assists per game record and runner up totals with 8.71 and 9.45 assists per game. Of course, he led the league in both of these seasons, but he also led the league in steals in 1983–84 with 2.2. His career assists total record of 562 set from 1982–85 stood until Tony Bennett established a new record of 599 seven seasons later. His career average of 8.52 per game stands far ahead of the second place total of 6.46. Note that Lathen's freshman season predates this conference and is not included in the record books or career totals. Lathen's UIC four-year assist total was 755, which would have stood as the conference total record until Jones totaled 819 in 2010. For the 1982–83 season, Lathen was a second team All-AMCU selection and the following season he was a first team selection and conference player of the year. In addition, in 1983–84 he was an All-Tournament Team selection despite the fact that UIC was eliminated in the semifinals of the AMCU Tournament.

Lathen has held numerous UIC records. He continues to hold career, single-season and single-game total records for assists. He formerly held the career steals record with 184 and continues to hold the single-season record with 75 set in 1982–83. He has the three highest single-game assist totals of 17, 16 and 16. A 2009 publication by ESPN ranked him among the five greatest players in the history of the UIC basketball program.

== See also ==
- List of NCAA Division I men's basketball season assists leaders
