= Tarkus Ferguson =

American basketball player

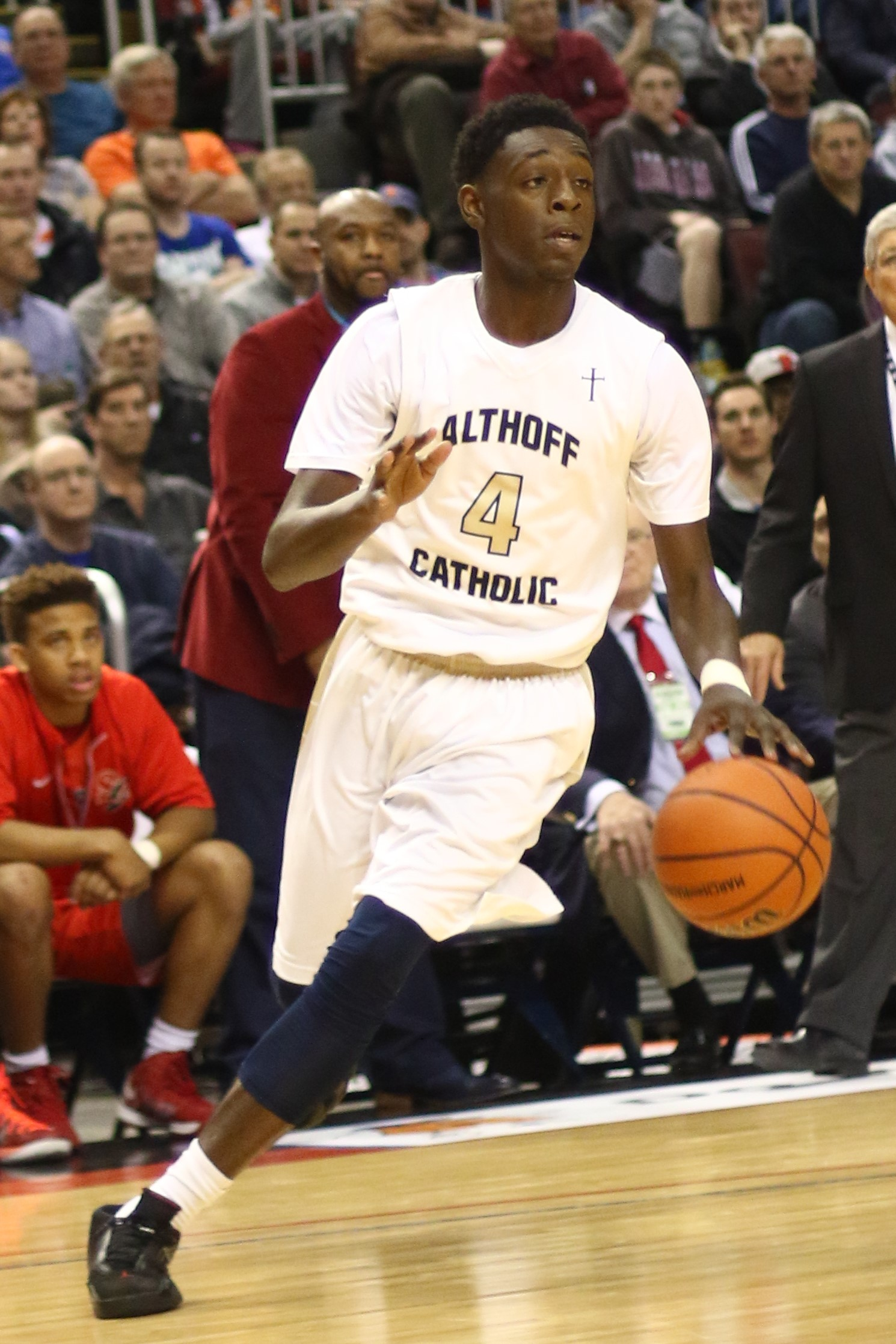
- Ferguson in the 2015 IHSA Class 3A Championship game

No. 9 – Rayos de Hermosillo
- Position: Shooting guard
- League: CIBACOPA

Personal information
- Born: July 27, 1997 (age 29)
- Listed height: 6 ft 4 in (1.93 m)
- Listed weight: 190 lb (86 kg)

Career information
- High school: Belleville West (Belleville, Illinois); Cahokia (Cahokia, Illinois); Althoff Catholic (Belleville, Illinois)
- College: UIC (2016–2020)
- NBA draft: 2020: undrafted
- Playing career: 2020–present

Career history
- 2020–2021: Vevey Riviera
- 2021: UBSC Graz
- 2021–2022: Sioux Falls Skyforce
- 2022: Salt Lake City Stars
- 2022–present: Rayos de Hermosillo

Career highlights
- 2x Second-team All-Horizon League (2019, 2020); Horizon League All-Freshman Team (2017)

Tarkus Ferguson (born July 27, 1997) is an American professional basketball player for the Rayos de Hermosillo of the Circuito de Baloncesto de la Costa del Pacífico (CIBACOPA). He played college basketball for the UIC Flames.

== Early life and high school career ==
Ferguson played his freshman season at Belleville High School-West and saw action in five games. He transferred to Cahokia High School as a sophomore and averaged 8.2 points per game on a team that finished 23–9. Before his junior season, Ferguson transferred to Althoff Catholic High School in Belleville, Illinois, which he wanted to attend as a freshman. As a junior, Ferguson scored 21 points to lead the Crusaders to a 65–53 victory against Cahokia in the championship game of the Class 3A Mascoutah Regional. As a senior, he led the team to a 32–2 record and 62–37 win against Providence Catholic High School in the Illinois Class 3A state championship. Ferguson also played football as a wide receiver and was heavily recruited, but he decided to focus on basketball and committed to UIC because he liked coach Steve McClain's up-tempo style.

== College career ==
As a freshman, Ferguson averaged 11.2 points, 5.3 rebounds, and a conference-leading 5.4 assists per game. He was named to the Horizon League All-Freshman Team. Ferguson was sidelined for much of the nonconference part of his sophomore season with a foot injury. He averaged 10.6 points, 5.5 rebounds, and 5.0 assists per game. On November 16, 2018, Ferguson scored a career-high 25 points in a 100–95 overtime win against William & Mary. On December 5, 2018, he recorded the second triple-double in program history with 14 points, 12 rebounds and 11 assists in a 94–75 win against Illinois State. Ferguson led UIC in scoring (15.5 points per game), rebounding (6.8 per game) and assists (5.2 per game) and posted 26 double-digit scoring games as a junior, including seven double-doubles. He was named to the Second Team All-Horizon League. Ferguson tied his career-high with 25 points in a 73–56 win against Wright State in the conference tournament semifinal. As a senior, Ferguson averaged 14.5 points, 5.9 rebounds, 4.8 assists, and 1.2 steals per game. He earned Second Team All-Horizon League honors for the second consecutive season.

== Professional career ==
=== Vevey Riviera (2020–2021) ===
On September 1, 2020, Ferguson signed with Vevey Riviera of the Swiss Basketball League.

=== UBSC Graz (2021) ===
On June 27, 2021, Ferguson signed with UBSC Graz of the Austrian Basketball Bundesliga.

=== Sioux Falls Skyforce (2021–2022) ===
On December 1, 2021, Ferguson was acquired by the Sioux Falls Skyforce via waivers. He was waived on January 28, 2022.

=== Salt Lake City Stars (2022) ===
On March 17, 2022, Ferguson was acquired via available player pool by the Salt Lake City Stars.

=== Rayos de Hermosillo (2022–2023) ===
On May 7, 2022, Ferguson signed with the Rayos de Hermosillo of the CIBACOPA.

=== Newfoundland Rogues (2024–present) ===
Tarkus Ferguson successfully tried out for the Newfoundland Rogues in November 2024. He made his debut on November 19th 2024.
