= Sherell Ford =

American basketball player (born 1972)

Personal information
- Born: August 26, 1972 (age 54) Baton Rouge, Louisiana, U.S.
- Listed height: 6 ft 7 in (2.01 m)
- Listed weight: 210 lb (95 kg)

Career information
- High school: Proviso East (Maywood, Illinois)
- College: UIC (1992–1995)
- NBA draft: 1995: 1st round, 26th overall pick
- Drafted by: Seattle SuperSonics
- Playing career: 1995–2006
- Position: Small forward
- Number: 1

Career history
- 1995–1996: Seattle SuperSonics
- 1996: La Crosse Bobcats
- 1996–1997: Grand Rapids Hoops
- 1997–1999: Yakima Sun Kings
- 1999–2000: Ikaros Esperos
- 2000–2001: Avtodor Saratov
- 2001–2002: Sagesse Beirut
- 2002–2003: Znicz Pruszków
- 2003–2004: Maccabi Habik'a
- 2004–2005: Peñarol de Mar del Plata
- 2006: Mersin Büyükşehir Belediyesi
- 2006: Deportivo Valdivia

Career highlights
- Horizon League Player of the Year (1995); First-team All-Horizon League (1995); First-team All-MCC (1994); MCC Tournament MVP (1994); No. 24 retired by UIC Flames
- Stats at NBA.com
- Stats at Basketball Reference

Sherell Ford (born August 26, 1972) is an American former professional basketball player. A 6'7" forward from the University of Illinois at Chicago, Ford was selected by the Seattle SuperSonics in the first round (26th overall) of the 1995 NBA draft and signed a three-year $1.67 million contract. However, Ford played only one NBA season before being released by the team. In his brief NBA career, he played in 28 games and scored a total of 90 points. His final NBA game was played on April 21, 1996, in a 99–88 loss to the Denver Nuggets where he played for 3 minutes and his only stat was 1 steal.

While at Proviso East High School in Maywood, Illinois, Ford was teammate of fellow NBA players Michael Finley and Donnie Boyce. While at UIC, Ford finished in the top three in points per game (1st), rebounds per game (1st), blocks per game (2nd) and steals per game (3rd) in the Mid-Continent Conference (now known as Summit League) during his sophomore season. The following year, he averaged over 26 points per game, good for fourth in the nation, and secured Midwestern Collegiate Conference (now known as Horizon League) player of the year before entering the NBA draft.
