= Cedrick Banks =

American basketball player (born 1981)

Personal information
- Born: December 16, 1981 (age 44) Chicago, Illinois, U.S.
- Listed height: 6 ft 3 in (1.91 m)
- Listed weight: 169 lb (77 kg)

Career information
- High school: Westinghouse (Chicago, Illinois)
- College: UIC (2001–2005)
- NBA draft: 2005: undrafted
- Playing career: 2005–2015
- Position: Shooting guard
- Number: 34

Career history
- 2005: Nebraska Cranes
- 2005–2006: Besançon BCD
- 2006–2007: SLUC Nancy Basket
- 2007–2008: Maccabi Rishon LeZion
- 2008–2010: Orléans Loiret Basket
- 2010–2011: Limoges CSP
- 2011–2012: Orléans Loiret Basket
- 2012: Türk Telekom
- 2012–2013: Élan Chalon
- 2013: Liège Basket
- 2013–2014: STB Le Havre
- 2014–2015: Cholet Basket

Career highlights
- French Cup winner (2010); French 2nd Division Foreign Player's MVP (2006); LNB Pro B Best Scorer (2006); Fourth-team Parade All-American (2000)

Cedrick Banks (born December 16, 1981) is an American former professional basketball player who last played for Cholet Basket of the LNB Pro A.

== High school and college ==
Banks starred at Westinghouse High School in Chicago. He was named Chicago Sun Times Player of the Year as a senior in 2000, ahead of other area standouts such as Dwyane Wade of Richards High School and Eddy Curry of Thornwood High School. Banks led Westinghouse to the 2000 state championship game, where he scored 22 points, but his team lost to West Aurora High School.

After graduating high school, Banks went on to play for the University of Illinois at Chicago. He redshirted his first season because of academic problems, then led his team in scoring (13.6 points) in 2001–02. Over the next three seasons, Banks earned three All-Horizon League First Team nods and was a five-time Horizon League Player of the Week. As a senior, he broke UIC's career scoring record, ending his collegiate career with 2,097 points. His point guard at Westinghouse and UIC was Martell Bailey.

== Professional career ==
Banks began his professional career in May 2005 with the Nebraska Cranes of the United States Basketball League. After averaging 17.1 points per game and winning All-Rookie Team honors, he signed with Besançon BCD of the French Pro-B Division, and he was named the Foreign Player's MVP of that league in 2006. He then played summer league basketball with the Chicago Bulls, but did not make the regular season team.

From 2006 to 2007, Banks was a member of SLUC Nancy of France's Pro-A Division. He represented the team at the 2006 French League All-Star Game, where he scored 12 points for the foreign players' team. Banks then signed with Maccabi Rishon LeZion of Israel. During the 2007–2008 season in the Israeli league, Banks averaged 14 points per game, and posted a season high of 36 against Hapoel Holon.

Banks signed with Entente Orléanaise in 2008. In 2010, he joined CSP Limoges. In July 2011 he returned to Entente Orléanaise for yet another season. In 2012, he signed with Türk Telekom Ankara, and he averaged 7.3 points and 2.0 assists in four Turkish League games. On December 4, 2012, he signed a short deal (until January 5, 2013) with Élan Chalon. In March 2013 he signed with Liège Basket. In July 2013, he signed with STB Le Havre.

On June 17, 2014, he signed with Cholet Basket for the 2014–15 season.
