= 2002 Horizon League men's basketball tournament =

- Classification: Division I
- Season: 2001–02
- Teams: 9
- Site: CSU Convocation Center; Cleveland, Ohio
- Champions: UIC (1st title)
- Winning coach: Jimmy Collins (1st title)
- MVP: Cedrick Banks (UIC)

The 2002 Horizon League men's basketball tournament took place at the end of the 2001–02 regular season. The tournament was hosted by Cleveland State University.

Notably, this was the first men's basketball tournament that the conference held under its current identity as the Horizon League; the conference was originally known as the Midwestern City Conference and later as the Midwestern Collegiate Conference. It was also the last Horizon League tournament for more than a decade to be held at a single, predetermined site. From 2003 through 2015, the tournament was played at campus locations. The next tournament to take place at a neutral site was the 2016 edition, held at Joe Louis Arena in Detroit.

== Seeds ==
All Horizon League schools played in the tournament. Teams were seeded by 2001–02 Horizon League season record, with a tiebreaker system to seed teams with identical conference records. The top 7 teams received a bye to the quarterfinals.

== Bracket ==
First round Friday, March 1
8	Green Bay	86
9	Youngstown State	65

Quarterfinals; Saturday, March 2
1	Butler	48
8	Green Bay	49
4	Wright State	64
5	Loyola	90
2	Detroit	67
7	Cleveland State	63
3	Milwaukee	68
6	UIC	75

Semifinals; Sunday, March 3
8	Green Bay	57
5	Loyola	63
2	Detroit	68
6	UIC	75

Championship; Tuesday, March 5
5	Loyola	75^{OT}
6	UIC	76
