= George Westinghouse College Prep =

Westinghouse College Prep
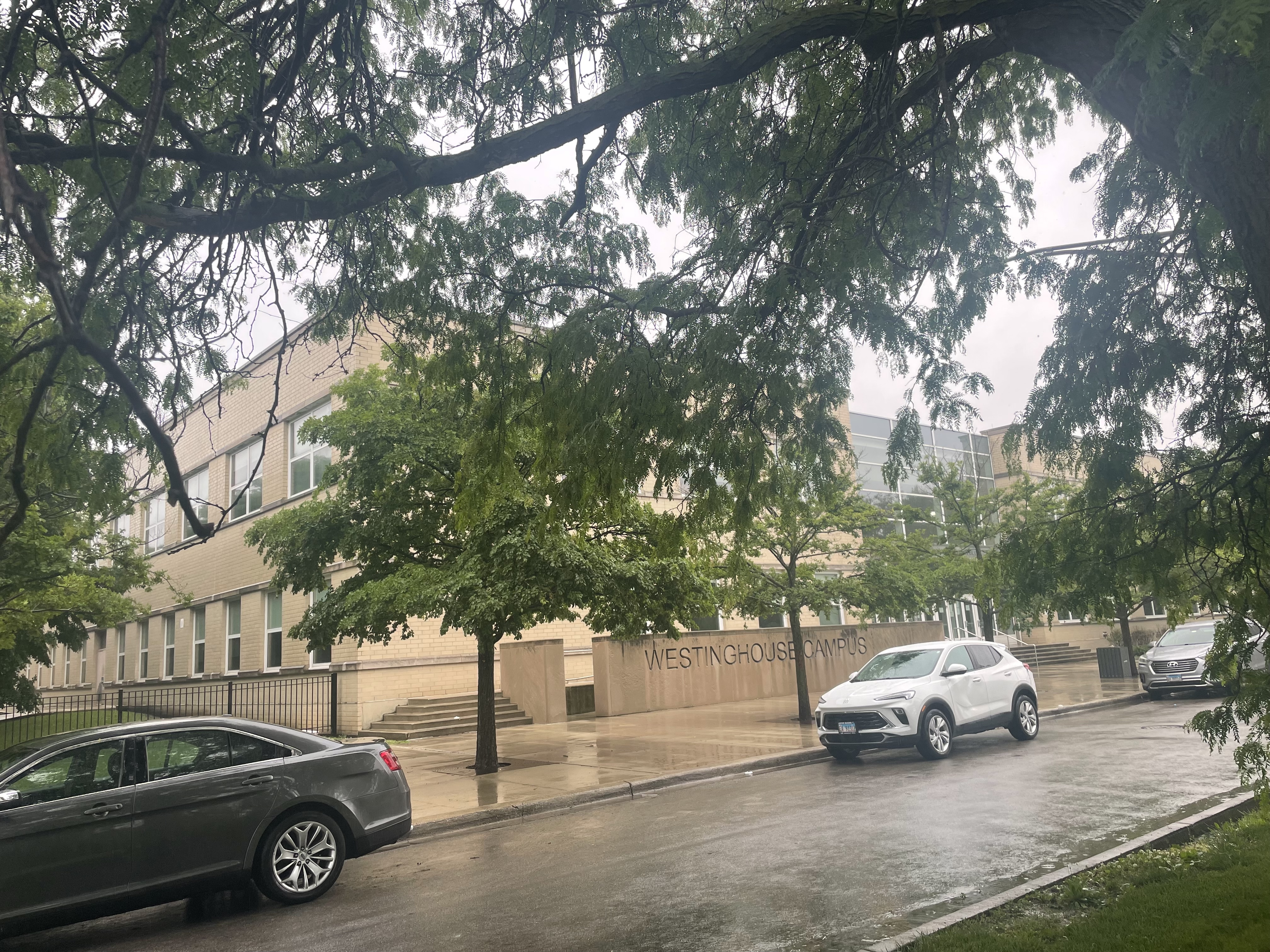
- Chicago, Illinois 60624; United States

Information
- School type: Public Secondary Selective Enrollment
- Opened: 2009
- School district: Chicago Public Schools
- CEEB code: 141001
- Principal: W. Terrell Burgess
- Teaching staff: 80.00 (FTE)
- Grades: 9–12
- Gender: Coed
- Enrollment: 1,199 (2022-23)
- Student to teacher ratio: 14.99
- Campus type: Urban
- Colors: Kelly Green; Gold
- Athletics conference: Chicago Public League
- Team name: Warriors
- Accreditation: North Central Association of Colleges and Schools
- Yearbook: The Torch
- Website: newwestinghouse.org

George Westinghouse College Preparatory High School (formerly known as Westinghouse Area Vocational High School) is a public four-year college preparatory selective enrollment high school located in the Humboldt Park neighborhood on the west side of Chicago, Illinois, United States. Operated by the Chicago Public Schools district, Westinghouse is named for American entrepreneur and engineer George Westinghouse. Westinghouse opened as a vocational school in 1967.

== History ==
Opening in August 1932, Westinghouse was originally housed in a former Bunte Brothers candy factory. The building was designed by Schmidt, Garden and Martin in 1920 and was one of the largest examples of the Chicago School architectural style. The factory was converted to a high school building in 1965, opening as a neighborhood vocational high school for the 1967 school year. The first graduating class was in 1968 with 24 senior class students and 23 actually graduating. A new, $106.5 million facility was built at 3223 West Franklin Boulevard in 2009. The former building was demolished and now is the site of the school's football field.

== Athletics ==
Westinghouse competes in the Chicago Public League (CPL) and is a member of the Illinois High School Association (IHSA). The school sport teams are nicknamed Warriors. For many years an area basketball powerhouse, The school's boys basketball team won the Illinois Class AA Boys' Basketball Championship in 2001–02 and were Class AA fifteen times (1976–79, 1980–81, 1989–94, 1995–96, 1998–2000, 2003–06). The basketball team were Public league champions seven times (1977–78, 1980–81, 1991–92, 1993–94, 1995–96, 1999–2000, 2001–02). The girls' basketball team were Regional champions in 2013–14. In 2014-15 the boys basketball team won a conference championship and a Regional Championship in 2016–17 season for the first time since the building reopened.

== Notable alumni ==
- Eddie Johnson – 1977, sports broadcaster and former Illinois and NBA basketball player.
- Mark Aguirre – 1978, basketball player who played for DePaul University and in the NBA from 1981 to 1994; first player selected in 1981 NBA draft.
- Hersey Hawkins – 1984, former professional basketball player who played for Bradley University and in the NBA for 13 seasons (1988–2001).
- Kiwane Garris – 1993, former professional basketball player who played in the NBA and the Italian League.
