= UIC Flames men's basketball =

Men's basketball team representing UIC

UIC Flames
2026–27 UIC Flames men's basketball team
- University: University of Illinois Chicago
- Head coach: Rob Ehsan (2nd season)
- Location: Chicago, Illinois
- Arena: Credit Union 1 Arena (capacity: 6,958)
- Conference: Missouri Valley Conference
- Nickname: Flames
- Colors: Navy blue and fire engine red

NCAA Division I tournament appearances
- 1998, 2002, 2004

Conference tournament champions
- 2002, 2004

Conference regular-season champions
- Mid-Continent Conference; 1984 Horizon League; 1998

Uniforms
Home	Away	Alternate

The UIC Flames men's basketball team represents the University of Illinois Chicago in Chicago, Illinois, United States. The team competes in the Missouri Valley Conference. From 1994 to 2022, the team competed in the Horizon League. The Flames are currently coached by Rob Ehsan. The Flames have appeared three times in the NCAA Division I tournament, most recently in 2004.

== Postseason ==
=== NCAA tournament results ===
The Flames have appeared in three NCAA Tournaments, including an at-large selection in 1998. Their combined record is 0–3.

Year	Seed	Round	Opponent	Result
1998	9	First Round	(8) Charlotte	L 62–77
2002	15	First Round	(2) Oklahoma	L 63–71
2004	13	First Round	(4) Kansas	L 53–78

=== NIT results ===
The Flames have appeared in the National Invitation Tournament (NIT) twice. Their record is 0–2.

Year	Round	Opponent	Result
2003	First Round	Western Michigan	L 62–63
2026	First Round	California	L 73–91

=== CIT results ===
The Flames have appeared in the CollegeInsider.com Postseason Tournament (CIT) two times. Their combined record is 4–2.

Year	Round	Opponent	Result
2013	First Round; Second Round	Chicago State; Northern Iowa	W 80–69; L 51–63
2018	First Round; Quarterfinals; Semifinals; Championship Game	Saint Francis (PA); Austin Peay; Liberty; Northern Colorado	W 84–61; W 83–81; W 67–51; L 71–76

=== CBI results ===
The Flames have appeared in one College Basketball Invitational (CBI). Their record is 2–1.

Year	Round	Opponent	Result
2017	First Round; Quarterfinals; Semifinals	Stony Brook; George Washington; Coastal Carolina	W 71–69; W 80–71; L 78–89

== Yearly records ==
Record table
Season	Coach	Overall	Conference	Standing	Postseason
Leo Gedvilas (1947–1958)
1947–48	Leo Gedvilas	1–15	–		
1948–49	Leo Gedvilas	6–12	–		
1949–50	Leo Gedvilas	12–6	–		
1950–51	Leo Gedvilas	11–6	–		
1951–52	Leo Gedvilas	8–8	–		
1952–53	Leo Gedvilas	9–8	–		
1953–54	Leo Gedvilas	13–3	–		
1954–55	Leo Gedvilas	15–2	–		
1955–56	Leo Gedvilas	8–7	–		
1956–57	Leo Gedvilas	9–7	–		
1957–58	Leo Gedvilas	10–6	–		
Leo Gedvilas:		102–80 (.560)			
Dick Rader (1958–1960)
1958–59	Dick Rader	8–6	–		
1959–60	Dick Rader	11–10	–		
Dick Rader:		19–16 (.543)			
Mike Maksud (1960–1962)
1960–61	Mike Maksud	10–11	–		
1961–62	Mike Maksud	11–15	–		
Mike Maksud:		21–26 (.447)			
Tom Russo (1962–1972)
1962–63	Tom Russo	9–9	–		
1963–64	Tom Russo	9–9	–		
1964–65	Tom Russo	9–9	–		
1965–66	Tom Russo	6–15	–		
1966–67	Tom Russo	8–7	–		
1967–68	Tom Russo	12–5	–		
1968–69	Tom Russo	11–11	–		
1969–70	Tom Russo	10–10	–		
1970–71	Tom Russo	4–21	–		
1971–72	Tom Russo	4–17	–		
Tom Russo:		82–113 (.421)			
Ed McQuillan (1972–1977)
1972–73	Ed McQuillan	6–16	–		
1973–74	Ed McQuillan	8–18	–		
1974–75	Ed McQuillan	8–18	–		
1975–76	Ed McQuillan	8–18	–		
1976–77	Ed McQuillan	8–18	–		
Ed McQuillan:		38–88 (.302)			
Tom Meyer (1977–1983)
1977–78	Tom Meyer	13–14	–		
1978–79	Tom Meyer	13–14	–		
1979–80	Tom Meyer	11–16	–		
1980–81	Tom Meyer	10–17	–		
NCAA Division I (1981–present)
1981–82	Tom Meyer	14–13	–		
Mid-Continent Conference (1982–1994)
1982–83	Tom Meyer	16–12	7–4	4th	
Tom Meyer:		77–86 (.472)	7–4 (.636)		
Willie Little (1983–1987)
1983–84	Willie Little	22–7	12–2	1st	
1984–85	Willie Little	14–14	7–7	5th	
1985–86	Willie Little	13–16	7–7	5th	
1986–87	Willie Little	17–15	9–5	3rd	
Willie Little:		66–52 (.559)	35–21 (.625)		
Bob Hallberg (1987–1996)
1987–88	Bob Hallberg	8–20	4–10	6th	
1988–89	Bob Hallberg	13–17	3–9	8th	
1989–90	Bob Hallberg	16–12	6–6	5th	
1990–91	Bob Hallberg	15–15	5–11	8th	
1991–92	Bob Hallberg	16–14	10–6	3rd	
1992–93	Bob Hallberg	17–15	9–7	4th	
1993–94	Bob Hallberg	20–9	14–4	3rd	
Mid-Continent Conference:		105–102 (.507)	51–53 (.490)		
Midwestern Collegiate Conference/Horizon League (1994–2022)
1994–95	Bob Hallberg	18–9	11–4	T–2nd	
1995–96	Bob Hallberg	10–18	5–11	T–6th	
Midwestern Collegiate:		28–27 (.509)	16–15 (.516)		
Bob Hallberg:		133–129 (.508)	67–68 (.496)		
Jimmy Collins (1996–2010)
1996–97	Jimmy Collins	15–14	11–5	T–6th	
1997–98	Jimmy Collins	22–6	12–2	T–1st	NCAA First Round
1998–99	Jimmy Collins	7–21	2–12	8th	
1999-00	Jimmy Collins	11–20	5–9	7th	
2000–01	Jimmy Collins	11–17	5–9	6th	
2001–02	Jimmy Collins	20–14	8–8	6th	NCAA First Round
2002–03	Jimmy Collins	21–9	12–4	3rd	NIT First Round
2003–04	Jimmy Collins	24–8	12–4	2nd	NCAA First Round
2004–05	Jimmy Collins	15–14	8–8	T–4th	
2005–06	Jimmy Collins	16–15	8–8	T–3rd	
2006–07	Jimmy Collins	14–18	7–9	T–4th	
2007–08	Jimmy Collins	18–15	9–9	T–4th	
2008–09	Jimmy Collins	16–15	7–11	T–6th	
2009–10	Jimmy Collins	8–22	3–15	9th	
Jimmy Collins:		218–208 (.512)	109–113 (.491)		
Howard Moore (2010–2015)
2010–11	Howard Moore	7–24	2–16	T–9th	
2011–12	Howard Moore	8–22	3–15	9th	
2012–13	Howard Moore	18–16	7–9	T–5th	CIT second round
2013–14	Howard Moore	6–25	1–15	9th	
2014–15	Howard Moore	10–24	4–12	7th	
Howard Moore:		49–111 (.306)	17–67 (.202)		
Steve McClain (2015–2020)
2015–16	Steve McClain	5–25	3–15	10th	
2016–17	Steve McClain	17–19	7–11	6th	CBI Semifinals
2017–18	Steve McClain	20–16	12–6	3rd	CIT Runner-Up
2018–19	Steve McClain	16–16	10–8	5th	
2019–20	Steve McClain	18–17	10–8	T–4th	
Steve McClain:		76–93 (.450)	42–48 (.467)		
Luke Yaklich (2020–2024)
2020–21	Luke Yaklich	9–13	6–10	10th	
2021–22	Luke Yaklich	14–16	9–10	8th	
Horizon League:		23–29 (.442)	15–20 (.429)		
Missouri Valley Conference (2022–present)
2022–23	Luke Yaklich	12–20	4–16	11th	
2023–24	Luke Yaklich	12–21	4–16	11th	
Missouri Valley:		24-45 (.348)	8–32 (.200)		
Luke Yaklich:		47–65 (.420)	23–52 (.307)		
Rob Ehsan (2024–present)
2024–25	Rob Ehsan	17-14	10-10	6th	
2025–26	Rob Ehsan	19-16	12-8	5th	NIT First Round
Rob Ehsan:		36-30 (.545)	22–18 (.550)		
Total:		964–1097 (.468)			
National champion Postseason invitational champion Conference regular season champion Conference regular season and conference tournament champion Division regular season champion Division regular season and conference tournament champion Conference tournament champion

== Alumni playing in international leagues ==
- Kelsey Barlow, playing in the Liga Nacional de Básquetbol
- Tarkus Ferguson, playing in the Circuito de Baloncesto de la Costa del Pacífico
- Tai Odiase, playing in the Israeli Basketball Premier League
