= 2021–22 West Coast Conference men's basketball season =

- League: NCAA Division I
- Sport: Men's basketball
- Number of teams: 10

Regular season
- Season champions: Gonzaga
- Runners-up: Saint Mary's
- Season MVP: Drew Timme, Gonzaga

Tournament

Basketball seasons
- ← 2020–21 2022–23 →

2021–22 West Coast Conference men's basketball standings
	Conf.				Overall
Team	W		L	PCT	W		L	PCT
No. 1 Gonzaga †	13	–	1	.929	28	–	4	.875
No. 18 Saint Mary's	12	–	3	.800	26	–	8	.765
Santa Clara	10	–	5	.667	21	–	12	.636
San Francisco	10	–	6	.625	24	–	10	.706
BYU	9	–	6	.600	24	–	11	.686
Portland	7	–	7	.500	19	–	15	.559
San Diego	7	–	9	.438	15	–	16	.484
Pacific	3	–	11	.214	8	–	22	.267
Loyola Marymount	3	–	12	.200	11	–	18	.379
Pepperdine	1	–	15	.063	7	–	25	.219
† 2022 WCC tournament winner Rankings from AP poll

The 2021–22 West Coast Conference men's basketball season began with practices in September 2021 and ended with the 2022 West Coast Conference men's basketball tournament in March 2022. This will be the 71st season for WCC men's basketball, and the 33rd under its current name of "West Coast Conference". The conference was founded in 1952 as the California Basketball Association, became the West Coast Athletic Conference in 1956, and dropped the word "Athletic" in 1989.

== Head coaches ==
=== Coaching changes ===
Two new head coaches will lead their team in the WCC during the 2021–22 season. On March 22, 2021, Shantay Legans, the then coach at Eastern Washington University, revealed via Twitter that he had accepted the position as the head coach at the University of Portland. Then, on July 7, 2021, the University of the Pacific announced that associate head coach Leonard Perry would become the new head coach of the Tigers. The former head coach, Damon Stoudamire, accepted a position as an assistant coach with the Boston Celtics under Ime Udoka. Perry was previously the head basketball coach at the University of Idaho from 2001 to 2006.

=== Coaches ===
Team	Head coach	Previous job	Years at school	Overall record	WCC record	WCC Tournament record	NCAA tournaments	Sweet Sixteens
BYU	Mark Pope	Utah Valley	3	44–15 (.746)	23–6 (.793)	1–2 (.333)	1	0
Gonzaga	Mark Few	Gonzaga (asst.)	23	630–124 (.836)	305–31 (.908)	45–5 (.900)	21	10
Loyola Marymount	Stan Johnson	Marquette (asst.)	2	13–9 (.591)	7–5 (.583)	1–1 (.500)	0	0
Pacific	Leonard Perry	Pacific (asst.)	1	0–0 (–)	0–0 (–)	0–0 (–)	0	0
Pepperdine	Lorenzo Romar	Arizona (asst.)	4	89–90 (.497)	21–25 (.457)	5–3 (.625)	7	3
Portland	Shantay Legans	Eastern Washington	1	0–0 (–)	0–0 (–)	0–0 (–)	1	0
Saint Mary's	Randy Bennett	Saint Louis(asst.)	21	454–192 (.703)	223–98 (.695)	25–17 (.595)	7	1
San Diego	Sam Scholl	San Diego (asst.)	4	35–50 (.412)	11–30 (0.268)	3–3 (0.500)	0	0
San Francisco	Todd Golden	San Francisco (asst.)	3	33–26 (.559)	13–16 (.448)	3–2 (.600)	0	0
Santa Clara	Herb Sendek	Arizona State	6	76–72 (.514)	36–40 (.474)	4–5 (.444)	8	1

Notes:

- Year at school includes 2021–22 season.
- Overall and WCC records are from time at current school and are through the beginning of the 2021–22 season.

== Preseason ==
=== Conference realignment ===
On September 10, 2021, BYU was one of four schools (the others being Cincinnati, Houston, and UCF) that accepted invitations to join the Big 12 Conference beginning with the 2023–24 athletic season. Therefore, BYU remained a member of the WCC for this season and the 2022–23 season, with the WCC potentially dropping to nine teams for the 2023–24 season. West Coast Conference commissioner Gloria Nevarez indicated that the conference is open to adding additional schools to the conference to ensure "continued success" for the league.

=== Preseason poll ===
2021-22 WCC Preseason Men's Basketball Coaches Poll
Rank	Team (First Place Votes)	Points
1.	Gonzaga (9)	81
2.	BYU (1)	72
3.	Saint Mary's	63
4.	Loyola Marymount	56
5.	San Francisco	49
6.	Santa Clara	45
7.	Pepperdine	31
8.	Pacific	24
8.	San Diego	20
10.	Portland	9

=== All-WCC Preseason Men's Basketball team ===
Honor	Recipient
Preseason All-WCC Team	Alex Barcello, BYU
Preseason All-WCC Team	Jamaree Bouyea, San Francisco
Preseason All-WCC Team	Logan Johnson, Saint Mary's
Preseason All-WCC Team	Caleb Lohner, BYU
Preseason All-WCC Team	Andrew Nembhard, Gonzaga
Preseason All-WCC Team	Eli Scott, LMU
Preseason All-WCC Team	Khalil Shabazz, San Francisco
Preseason All-WCC Team	Drew Timme, Gonzaga
Preseason All-WCC Team	Josip Vrankic, Santa Clara
Preseason All-WCC Team	Jalen Williams, Santa Clara

== Rankings ==
Legend
	Improvement in ranking
	Drop in ranking
	Not ranked previous week
RV	Received votes but were not ranked in top 25 of poll
(Italics)	Number of first-place votes

		Pre/ Wk 1	Wk 2	Wk 3	Wk 4	Wk 5	Wk 6	Wk 7	Wk 8	Wk 9	Wk 10	Wk 11	Wk 12	Wk 13	Wk 14	Wk 15	Wk 16	Wk 17	Wk 18	Final
BYU	AP	RV	RV	18	12	24	RV	RV			RV	RV	RV							
BYU	C			18	13	23	RV	RV		RV	RV	RV	RV							
Gonzaga	AP	1 (55)	1 (55)	1 (55)	3 (1)	5	5	4	4	4	2	1 (25)	2 (15)	2 (12)	2 (13)	1 (56)	1 (61)	1 (46)	1 (52)	1 (54)
Gonzaga	C	1 (29)	1 (29)	1 (30)	3	5	5	4	4	4	2	1 (23)	1 (18)	1 (16)	1 (18)	1 (30)	1 (32)	1 (20)	1 (27)	1 (31)
Loyola Marymount	AP																			
Loyola Marymount	C																			
Pacific	AP																			
Pacific	C																			
Pepperdine	AP																			
Pepperdine	C																			
Portland	AP																			
Portland	C																			
Saint Mary's	AP												RV	RV	22	RV	23	19	17	18
Saint Mary's	C						RV	RV	RV	RV			RV	RV	22	RV	23	20	17	16
San Diego	AP																			
San Diego	C																			
San Francisco	AP			RV	RV	RV	RV	RV	RV	RV	RV				RV	RV			RV	RV
San Francisco	C			RV	RV	RV	RV	RV	RV	RV		RV	RV		RV	RV	RV		RV	RV
Santa Clara	AP																			
Santa Clara	C																			

== Regular season ==
=== Conference matrix ===
	BYU	Gonzaga	Loyola Marymount	Pacific	Pepperdine	Portland	Saint Mary's	San Diego	San Francisco	Santa Clara
vs. BYU	–	2–0	0–2	1–1	0–2	0–1	1–1	0–1	1–1	1–0
vs. Gonzaga	0–2	–	0–1	0–1	0–2	0–1	1–1	0–1	0–2	0–2
vs. Loyola Marymount	2–0	1–0	–	1–1	0–1	1–1	2–0	2–0	1–0	2–0
vs. Pacific	1–1	1–0	1–1	–	1–1	2–0	0–0	2–0	1–0	2–0
vs. Pepperdine	2–0	2–0	1–0	1–1	–	2–0	2–0	2–0	2–0	1–0
vs. Portland	1–0	1–0	1–1	0–2	0–2	–	1–0	1–1	1–1	1–0
vs. Saint Mary's	1–1	1–1	0–2	0–0	0–2	0–1	–	0–2	0–2	1–1
vs. San Diego	1–0	1–0	0–2	0–2	0–2	1–1	2–0	–	2–0	2–0
vs. San Francisco	1–1	2–0	0–1	0–1	0–2	1–1	2–0	0–2	–	0–2
vs. Santa Clara	0–1	2–0	0–2	0–2	0–1	0–1	1–1	0–2	2–0	–
Total	9–6	13–1	3–12	3–11	1–15	7–7	12–3	7–9	10–6	10–5

=== Early season tournaments ===
The following table summarizes the multiple-team events (MTE) or early season tournaments in which teams from the West Coast Conference will participate.

Team	Tournament	Dates	Arena	Arena location	Record	Bracketed	Finish	TV partner
BYU	Diamond Head Classic	December 22–25	Stan Sheriff Center	Honolulu, Hawaii	2–1	Yes	3rd	ESPN
Gonzaga	Empire Classic	November 18–19	Madison Square Garden	New York, New York	2–0	No	N/A	ESPN
Loyola Marymount	Jacksonville Classic	November 17–22	UNF Arena	Jacksonville, Florida	2–1	Yes	3rd	CBS
Pacific	Rainbow Classic	November 10–13	Stan Sheriff Center	Honolulu, Hawaii	1–2	No	N/A	N/A
Pepperdine	SoCal Challenge	November 22–24	Pavilion at JSerra	San Juan Capistrano, California	0–3	No	N/A	CBS/FloHoops
Portland	Incarnate Word Tournament	November 26–28	McDermott Center	San Antonio, Texas	2–1	No	N/A	N/A
Saint Mary's	Maui Invitational	November 22–24	Lahaina Civic Center	Maui, Hawaii	2–1	Yes	2nd	ESPN
San Diego	Las Vegas Classic	November 25–26	Orleans Arena	Paradise, Nevada	2–1	Yes	3rd	N/A
San Francisco	Las Vegas Invitational	November 25–26	Orleans Arena	Las Vegas, Nevada	2–0	Yes	1st	Fox Sports
Santa Clara	SoCal Challenge	November 22–24	Pavilion at JSerra	San Juan Capistrano, California	2–1	No	N/A	CBS/FloHoops

=== WCC Player/Freshman of the Week ===
Throughout the year, the West Coast Conference names a player of the week and a freshman of the week as follows:

Week	Date	Player of the Week	Freshman of the Week
1	November 15, 2021	Drew Timme, Gonzaga	Chet Holmgren, Gonzaga
2	November 22, 2021	Alex Barcello, BYU	Chet Holmgren, Gonzaga
3	November 29, 2021	Dan Fotu, Saint Mary's	Chet Holmgren, Gonzaga
4	December 6, 2021	Jamaree Bouyea, San Francisco	Chet Holmgren, Gonzaga
5	December 13, 2021	Jamaree Bouyea, San Francisco	Houston Mallette, Pepperdine
6	December 20, 2021	Andrew Nembhard, Gonzaga	Mike Mitchell Jr., Pepperdine
7	December 27, 2021	Fousseyni Traore, BYU	Fousseyni Traore, BYU
8	January 3, 2022	Logan Johnson, Saint Mary's	Nolan Hickman, Gonzaga
9	January 11, 2022	Yauhen Massalski, San Francisco	Fousseyni Traore, BYU
10	January 17, 2022	Drew Timme, Gonzaga	Chet Holmgren, Gonzaga
11	January 24, 2022	Alex Ducas, Saint Mary's	Chet Holmgren, Gonzaga & Fousseyni Traore, BYU
12	January 31, 2022	Matthias Tass, Saint Mary's	Chet Holmgren, Gonzaga
13	February 7, 2022	Chet Holmgren, Gonzaga	Chet Holmgren, Gonzaga
14	February 14, 2022	Tyler Robertson, Portland	Houston Mallette, Pepperdine
15	February 21, 2022	Tommy Kuhse, Saint Mary's	Chet Holmgren, Gonzaga
16	February 28, 2022	Logan Johnson, Saint Mary's	Fousseyni Traore, BYU

== National awards and teams ==
=== All-Americans ===
The following WCC players were named as national All-Americans as follows:

Player	School	Associated Press	United States Basketball Writers Association	National Association of Basketball Coaches	Sporting News	Consensus Points
Drew Timme	Gonzaga	2	2	2	2	8
Chet Holmgren	Gonzaga	2	3	3	2	6

=== Other National Awards ===
The following WCC players were named to national award watch lists and received awards as follows:

==== Wooden Award – Player of the Year ====
Preseason Top 50	Midseason Top 25	Late Season Top 20	Top 15 Ballot	Wooden 10 All Americans	5 Finalists
Chet Holmgren, Gonzaga	Chet Holmgren, Gonzaga	Chet Holmgren, Gonzaga	Chet Holmgren, Gonzaga	Chet Holmgren, Gonzaga	Drew Timme, Gonzaga
Andrew Nembhard, Gonzaga	Drew Timme, Gonzaga	Drew Timme, Gonzaga	Drew Timme, Gonzaga	Drew Timme, Gonzaga	
Drew Timme, Gonzaga					

==== Naismith Award – Player of the Year ====
Preseason Top 50	Midseason Top 30	10 Semifinalists	4 Finalists
Alex Barcello, BYU	Chet Holmgren, Gonzaga	Chet Holmgren, Gonzaga	(none)
Andrew Nembhard, Gonzaga	Drew Timme, Gonzaga	Drew Timme, Gonzaga	
Chet Holmgren, Gonzaga			
Drew Timme, Gonzaga			

==== Lute Olson – Player of the Year ====
Preseason Top 40	Midseason Top 30	10 Semifinalists	4 Finalists
Alex Barcello, BYU	Alex Barcello, BYU	Chet Holmgren, Gonzaga	(none)
Chet Holmgren, Gonzaga	Chet Holmgren, Gonzaga	Drew Timme, Gonzaga	
Drew Timme, Gonzaga	Drew Timme, Gonzaga		

==== Bob Cousy Award – Point Guard ====
Preseason Top 20	Midseason Top 10	5 Finalists
Andrew Nembhard, Gonzaga	Andrew Nembhard, Gonzaga	Andrew Nembhard, Gonzaga

==== Jerry West Award – Shooting Guard ====
Preseason Top 20	Midseason Top 10	5 Finalists
Hunter Sallis, Gonzaga	(none)	(none)

==== Julius Erving Award – Small Forward ====
Preseason Top 20	Midseason Top 10	5 Finalists
(none)	(none)	(none)

==== Karl Malone Award – Power Forward ====
Preseason Top 20	Midseason Top 10	5 Finalists
Drew Timme, Gonzaga	Chet Holmgren, Gonzaga	Chet Holmgren, Gonzaga

==== Kareem Abdul-Jabbar Award – Center ====
Preseason Top 20	Midseason Top 10	5 Finalists
Chet Holmgren, Gonzaga	Drew Timme, Gonzaga	Drew Timme, Gonzaga

== All-WCC awards and teams ==
On March 2, 2022, the West Coast Conference announced the following awards:

Honor	Recipient	School
Player of the Year	Drew Timme	Gonzaga
Coach of the Year	Randy Bennett	Saint Mary's
Defensive Player of the Year	Chet Holmgren	Gonzaga
Newcomer of the Year	Chet Holmgren	Gonzaga
Sixth Man of the Year	Tommy Kuhse	Saint Mary's
All-WCC First Team	Alex Barcello	BYU
All-WCC First Team	Jamaree Bouyea	San Francisco
All-WCC First Team	Chet Holmgren	Gonzaga
All-WCC First Team	Tommy Kuhse	Saint Mary's
All-WCC First Team	Yauhen Massalski	San Francisco
All-WCC First Team	Andrew Nembhard	Gonzaga
All-WCC First Team	Matthias Tass	Saint Mary's
All-WCC First Team	Drew Timme	Gonzaga
All-WCC First Team	Josip Vrankic	Santa Clara
All-WCC First Team	Jalen Williams	Santa Clara
All-WCC Second Team	Alex Ducas	Saint Mary's
All-WCC Second Team	Logan Johnson	Saint Mary's
All-WCC Second Team	Keshawn Justice	Santa Clara
All-WCC Second Team	Tyler Robertson	Portland
All-WCC Second Team	Eli Scott	LMU
All-WCC Second Team	Khalil Shabazz	San Francisco
All-WCC Freshman Team	Nolan Hickman	Gonzaga
All-WCC Freshman Team	Chet Holmgren	Gonzaga
All-WCC Freshman Team	Maxwell Lewis	Pepperdine
All-WCC Freshman Team	Houston Mallette	Pepperdine
All-WCC Freshman Team	Wayne McKinney III	San Diego
All-WCC Freshman Team	Mike Mitchell Jr.	Pepperdine
All-WCC Freshman Team	Fousseyni Traore	BYU
WCC Honorable Mention	Jeremiah Bailey	Pacific
WCC Honorable Mention	Rasir Bolton	Gonzaga
WCC Honorable Mention	Marcellus Earlington	San Diego
WCC Honorable Mention	Julian Strawther	Gonzaga
WCC Honorable Mention	Moses Wood	Portland

== Postseason ==
=== West Coast Conference tournament ===
Gonzaga defeated Saint Mary's 82–69 in the championship game to win the tournament on March 8. Mark Few was the winning coach and Andrew Nembhard was named the MVP of the tournament.

=== NCAA tournament ===
Three teams from the WCC participated in the 2022 NCAA tournament. Gonzaga received the automatic bid from the WCC and the #1 overall seed. Gonzaga advanced to the Sweet 16, where they were defeated by Arkansas 74–68. Saint Mary's received a 5 seed as an at-large selection and advanced to the second round where they were defeated by UCLA 72–56. San Francisco received a 10 seed as an at-large selection but was defeated in overtime in the first round, 92–87, by Murray State.

=== National Invitation Tournament (NIT) ===
BYU and Santa Clara participated in the 2022 NIT. BYU received a 2 seed and advanced to the quarterfinals where they lost to Washington State 77–58 while Santa Clara lost in the first round to Washington State 63–50.

=== College Basketball Invitational (CBI) tournament ===
No teams from the WCC participated in the 2022 CBI Tournament.

=== The Basketball Classic (TBC) ===
Portland received an invitation to and participated in the 2022 TBC. Portland defeated New Orleans in the first round but lost to Southern Utah in the quarterfinals 77–66.
