= 2021–22 Pacific Tigers men's basketball team =

American college basketball season

2021–22 Pacific Tigers men's basketball
- Conference: West Coast Conference
- Record: 8–22 (3–11 WCC)
- Head coach: Leonard Perry (1st season)
- Assistant coaches: Josh Newman; Luke Wicks
- Home arena: Alex G. Spanos Center

2021–22 West Coast Conference men's basketball standings
	Conf.				Overall
Team	W		L	PCT	W		L	PCT
No. 1 Gonzaga †	13	–	1	.929	28	–	4	.875
No. 18 Saint Mary's	12	–	3	.800	26	–	8	.765
Santa Clara	10	–	5	.667	21	–	12	.636
San Francisco	10	–	6	.625	24	–	10	.706
BYU	9	–	6	.600	24	–	11	.686
Portland	7	–	7	.500	19	–	15	.559
San Diego	7	–	9	.438	15	–	16	.484
Pacific	3	–	11	.214	8	–	22	.267
Loyola Marymount	3	–	12	.200	11	–	18	.379
Pepperdine	1	–	15	.063	7	–	25	.219
† 2022 WCC tournament winner Rankings from AP poll

The 2021–22 Pacific Tigers men's basketball team represented the University of the Pacific during the 2021–22 NCAA Division I men's basketball season. The Tigers were led by first-year head coach Leonard Perry and played their home games at the Alex G. Spanos Center in Stockton, California as members of the West Coast Conference (WCC).

The Tigers finished the season 8–22, 3–11 in WCC play, to finish in eighth place. They lost in the first round of the WCC tournament to Loyola Marymount.

== Previous season ==
The Tigers finished the 2020–21 season 9–9, 6–7 in WCC play, to finish in fifth place. They lost in the second round of the WCC tournament to Santa Clara.

On March 5, 2021 head coach Damon Stoudamire left to join the coaching staff of the NBA's Boston Celtics after five seasons and was replaced by top assistant Leonard Perry on July 7.

== Offseason ==
=== Departures ===
Name	Number	Pos.	Height	Weight	Year	Hometown	Reason for departure
Marial Mading	0	F	6' 11"	200	RS Sophomore	Perth, Australia	Turned pro
Daniss Jenkins	4	G	6' 3"	165	Sophomore	Dallas, TX	Transferred
Jonathan Salazar	10	F	6' 6"	250	Sophomore	Panama	Transferred
Jervay Green	12	G	6' 3"	200	Senior	Denver, CO	Transferred to Talladega College
Jahbril Price-Noel	22	G	6' 7"	215	Junior	Scarborough, ON	Transferred to Wagner
Broc Finstuen	24	G	6' 4"	200	Senior	Pine Island, MN	Graduate transferred to Cleveland State
Justin Moore	25	G	6' 4"	175	RS Senior	San Diego, CA	Graduated
Takori Rooks	30	F	6' 5"	215	Sophomore	Memphis, TN	Walk-on; did not return
James Hampshire	33	C	7' 1"	242	RS Senior	Flagstaff, AZ	Graduate transferred to UNLV
Nigel Shadd	45	F	6' 9"	250	RS Junior	Mesa, AZ	Not on team roster

=== Incoming transfers ===
Name	Number	Pos.	Height	Weight	Year	Hometown	Previous school
Khaleb Wilson-Rouse	0	G	6' 2"	180	Junior	Chicago, IL	New Mexico Military Institute
Alphonso Anderson	10	F	6' 6"	220	GS Senior	Tacoma, WA	Utah State
Sam Freeman	15	C	6' 10"	240	Junior	Dallas, TX	Minnesota
Luke Avdalovic	21	G	6' 5"	190	RS Senior	Folsom, CA	Northern Arizona
Greg Outlaw	24	G/F	6' 4"	175	Junior	Chicago, IL	Central Connecticut
Nick Blake	25	G	6' 6"	220	Sophomore	Las Vegas, NV	UNLV

=== Recruiting class of 2021 ===
College recruiting information
Name	Hometown	School	Height	Weight	Commit date
Jaden Byers; PG	Riverside, CA	Rancho Christian School	6 ft 5 in (1.96 m)	185 lb (84 kg)	Jul 18, 2020
Jaden Byers; PG	Recruit ratings: Scout: Rivals: (0)				
Overall recruit ranking: Scout: 98 Rivals: nr ESPN: nr
Note: In many cases, Scout, Rivals, 247Sports, On3, and ESPN may conflict in their listings of height and weight.; In these cases, the average was taken. ESPN grades are on a 100-point scale.; Sources: "Pacific 2021 Basketball Commitments". Rivals.; "2021 Pacific Basketball Commits". Scout.; "ESPN". ESPN.; "Scout.com Team Recruiting Rankings". Scout.; "2021 Team Ranking". Rivals.

== Roster ==
2021–22 Pacific Tigers men's basketball team
Players
Coaches

Pos.	#	Name	Height	Weight	Year	Previous school	Hometown
G	0	Khaleb Wilson-Rouse	6 ft 2 in (1.88 m)	180 lb (82 kg)	Jr	Prosser Career Academy; New Mexico Military Institute	Chicago, IL
G	1	Jordan Bell	6 ft 8 in (2.03 m)	221 lb (100 kg)	Sr	Inglewood HS; Loyola Marymount	Inglewood, CA
G	2	Jalen Brown	6 ft 3 in (1.91 m)	170 lb (77 kg)	So	Jefferson HS; Eastern Arizona CC	Portland, OR
G	3	Pierre II Crockrell	6 ft 0 in (1.83 m)	175 lb (79 kg)	So	Prolific Prep	Tacoma, WA
G/F	10	Alphonso Anderson	6 ft 6 in (1.98 m)	220 lb (100 kg)	RS Sr	Garfield HS; Utah State	Tacoma, WA
G	11	Jaden Byers	6 ft 2 in (1.88 m)	165 lb (75 kg)	Fr	Rancho Christian School	Riverside, CA
F	13	Jeremiah Bailey	6 ft 6 in (1.98 m)	220 lb (100 kg)	Sr	Monroe Catholic HS; Pima College	Fairbanks, AK
G	14	Greydon Edwards (W)	6 ft 0 in (1.83 m)	—	Fr	Pea Ridge HS	Bentonville, AR
C	15	Sam Freeman	6 ft 10 in (2.08 m)	240 lb (109 kg)	Jr	Northwest HS; Minnesota	Dallas, TX
G	21	Luke Avdalovic	6 ft 5 in (1.96 m)	190 lb (86 kg)	RS Sr	Vista del Lago HS; Northern Arizona	Folsom, CA
G/F	24	Greg Outlaw	6 ft 4 in (1.93 m)	175 lb (79 kg)	Jr	Rezin Orr Academy HS; Central Connecticut State	Chicago, IL
G	25	Nick Blake	6 ft 6 in (1.98 m)	200 lb (91 kg)	So	IMG Academy; UNLV	Las Vegas, NV

Head coach

- Leonard Perry (Idaho)

Assistant coach(es)

- Luke Wicks (Northern State)
- Josh Newman (Arizona State)

Legend

- (C) Team captain
- (S) Suspended
- (I) Ineligible
- (W) Walk-on
- Injured
- Current redshirt

Roster
Last update: August 11, 2025

== Schedule and results ==
Date time, TV	Rank^{#}	Opponent^{#}	Result	Record	High points	High rebounds	High assists	Site (attendance) city, state
Regular season
November 10, 2021*; 4:00 p.m.		vs. Northern Colorado; Outrigger Resorts Rainbow Classic	L 65–67	0–1	14 – Freeman	8 – Anderson	2 – tied	Stan Sheriff Center; Honolulu, HI
November 11, 2021*; 4:00 p.m.		vs. Hawaii–Hilo; Outrigger Resorts Rainbow Classic	W 85–74	1–1	17 – Avdalovic	9 – Bailey	6 – Crockrell II	Stan Sheriff Center; Honolulu, HI
November 13, 2021*; 7:00 p.m., ESPN+		at Hawaii; Outrigger Resorts Rainbow Classic	L 61–73	1–2	16 – tied	6 – Anderson	5 – Crockrell II	Stan Sheriff Center (2,276); Honolulu, HI
November 16, 2021*; 7:00 p.m.		Stanislaus State	W 65–46	2–2	18 – Anderson	13 – Anderson	4 – Crockrell II	Alex G. Spanos Center (1,188); Stockton, CA
November 19, 2021*; 7:00 p.m.		UTEP; Golden Turkey Classic	L 64–73	2–3	15 – Bailey	5 – Anderson	4 – Anderson	Alex G. Spanos Center (1,514); Stockton, CA
November 22, 2021*; 7:00 p.m.		Chicago State; Golden Turkey Classic	W 74–58	3–3	12 – tied	9 – Bell	7 – Crockrell II	Alex G. Spanos Center (173); Stockton, CA
November 26, 2021*; 7:00 p.m.		Arkansas–Pine Bluff; Golden Turkey Classic	W 74–50	4–3	14 – Anderson	13 – Anderson	5 – Crockrell II	Alex G. Spanos Center (1,016); Stockton, CA
December 1, 2021*; 6:00 p.m., ESPN+		at UC Davis	L 57–63	4–4	24 – Bailey	7 – Bell	3 – Anderson	The Pavilion (595); Davis, CA
December 4, 2021*; 5:00 p.m., ESPN+		at Cal State Fullerton	L 57–66	4–5	18 – Anderson	5 – Freeman	7 – Crockrell II	Titan Gym (323); Fullerton, CA
December 11, 2021*; 1:00 p.m.		at San Jose State	L 66–78	4–6	19 – Bell	7 – Bell	5 – Crockrell II	Provident Credit Union Event Center (1,546); San Jose, CA
December 14, 2021*; 7:00 p.m.		UC Santa Barbara	W 80–71	5–6	15 – tied	8 – tied	5 – tied	Alex G. Spanos Center (1,162); Stockton, CA
December 17, 2021*; 7:00 p.m.		North Dakota State	L 61–73	5–7	14 – Blake	9 – Blake	2 – tied	Alex G. Spanos Center (925); Stockton, CA
December 19, 2021*; 12:00 p.m.		UC Davis	L 67–77	5–8	18 – Avdalovic	7 – Bailey	6 – Crockrell II	Alex G. Spanos Center (968); Stockton, CA
December 22, 2021*; 3:00 p.m., P12N		at California	L 53–73	5–9	10 – Byers	6 – tied	3 – Crockrell II	Haas Pavilion (3,712); Berkeley, CA
January 6, 2022; 6:00 p.m., BYUtv		at BYU	L 51–73	5–10 (0–1)	12 – Avdalovic	7 – Bell	3 – tied	Marriott Center (13,584); Provo, UT
January 12, 2022; 7:00 p.m., WCC Network		Santa Clara; Rescheduled from Dec. 30	L 70–84	5–11 (0–2)	23 – Anderson	7 – Bailey	5 – Crockrell II	Alex G. Spanos Center (948); Stockton, CA
January 15, 2022; 4:30 p.m., NBCSCA		at Saint Mary's	Canceled					University Credit Union Pavilion; Moraga, CA
January 20, 2022; 6:00 p.m., NBCSCA		No. 1 Gonzaga	Canceled					Alex G. Spanos Center; Stockton, CA
January 22, 2022; 5:30 p.m., WCC Network		San Diego	L 65–73	5–12 (0–3)	24 – Crockrell II	11 – Anderson	4 – Crockrell II	Alex G. Spanos Center (0); Stockton, CA
January 27, 2022; 7:00 p.m., WCC Network		at Portland	L 56–64	5–13 (0–4)	17 – Anderson	10 – Anderson	3 – Anderson	Chiles Center (1,010); Portland, OR
January 29, 2022; 6:30 p.m., ESPNU		BYU	W 76–73	6–13 (1–4)	20 – Blake	11 – Bailey	7 – Anderson	Alex G. Spanos Center (2,521); Stockton, CA
January 31, 2022; 6:00 p.m., WCC Network		at Santa Clara	L 59–81	6–14 (1–5)	19 – Bailey	7 – Bailey	5 – Crockrell II	Leavey Center (680); Santa Clara, CA
February 3, 2022; 7:00 p.m., WCC Network		Pepperdine; Rescheduled from Jan. 1	W 81–76	7–14 (2–5)	24 – Bailey	9 – Anderson	6 – Crockrell II	Alex G. Spanos Center (866); Stockton, CA
February 5, 2022; 5:00 p.m., WCC Network		at Pepperdine	L 64–70	7–15 (2–6)	17 – Anderson	7 – Anderson	4 – Crockrell II	Firestone Fieldhouse (515); Malibu, CA
February 8, 2022*; 7:00 p.m., P12N		at No. 21 USC	L 68–74	7–16	22 – Anderson	9 – Anderson	4 – Crockrell II	Galen Center (2,189); Los Angeles, CA
February 10, 2022; 6:00 p.m., CBSSN		at No. 2 Gonzaga	L 51–89	7–17 (2–7)	16 – Anderson	8 – Anderson	3 – Crockrell II	McCarthey Athletic Center (6,000); Spokane, WA
February 12, 2022; 6:00 p.m., WCC Network		at San Diego	L 54–60	7–18 (2–8)	14 – Bailey	12 – Bailey	1 – tied	Jenny Craig Pavilion (897); San Diego, CA
February 19, 2022; 7:00 p.m., WCC Network		Loyola Marymount; Rescheduled from Jan. 8	W 69–68	8–18 (3–8)	22 – Bailey	10 – Anderson	9 – Crockrell II	Alex G. Spanos Center (1,014); Stockton, CA
February 21, 2022; 6:00 p.m., WCC Network		San Francisco; Rescheduled from February 15	L 71–104	8–19 (3–9)	20 – Bailey	5 – Anderson	4 – Crockrell II	Alex G. Spanos Center (1,227); Stockton, CA
February 24, 2022; 7:00 p.m., WCC Network		Portland	L 69–75	8–20 (3–10)	26 – Anderson	9 – Anderson	3 – tied	Alex G. Spanos Center (1,093); Stockton, CA
February 26, 2022; 4:30 p.m., NBCSBA		at Loyola Marymount	L 77–90	8–21 (3–11)	19 – Anderson	10 – Bailey	3 – Avdalovic	Gersten Pavilion (844); Los Angeles, CA
WCC tournament
March 3, 2022; 6:00 p.m., WCC Network	(9)	vs. (8) Loyola Marymount; First round	L 66–86	8–22	13 – Anderson	8 – Bailey	9 – Crockrell II	Orleans Arena (1,775); Paradise, NV
*Non-conference game. ^{#}Rankings from AP poll. (#) Tournament seedings in parentheses. All times are in Pacific.
