= 2021–22 Gonzaga Bulldogs men's basketball team =

American college basketball season

2021–22 Gonzaga Bulldogs men's basketball

WCC regular season and tournament champions Empire Classic champions

NCAA tournament, Sweet Sixteen
- Conference: West Coast Conference

Ranking
- Coaches: No. 5
- AP: No. 1
- Record: 28–4 (13–1 WCC)
- Head coach: Mark Few (23rd season)
- Assistant coaches: Brian Michaelson (9th season); Roger Powell Jr. (3rd season); Stephen Gentry (1st season)
- Home arena: McCarthey Athletic Center

2021–22 West Coast Conference men's basketball standings
	Conf.				Overall
Team	W		L	PCT	W		L	PCT
No. 1 Gonzaga †	13	–	1	.929	28	–	4	.875
No. 18 Saint Mary's	12	–	3	.800	26	–	8	.765
Santa Clara	10	–	5	.667	21	–	12	.636
San Francisco	10	–	6	.625	24	–	10	.706
BYU	9	–	6	.600	24	–	11	.686
Portland	7	–	7	.500	19	–	15	.559
San Diego	7	–	9	.438	15	–	16	.484
Pacific	3	–	11	.214	8	–	22	.267
Loyola Marymount	3	–	12	.200	11	–	18	.379
Pepperdine	1	–	15	.063	7	–	25	.219
† 2022 WCC tournament winner Rankings from AP poll

The 2021–22 Gonzaga Bulldogs men's basketball team represented Gonzaga University, located in Spokane, Washington, in the 2021–22 NCAA Division I men's basketball season. The team, also unofficially nicknamed the "Zags", is led by head coach Mark Few, in his 23rd season as head coach. This was the Bulldogs' 18th season at the on-campus McCarthey Athletic Center and 42nd season as a member of the West Coast Conference (WCC). They finished the season 28-4, 13-1 in WCC Play to finish as WCC regular season champions. They defeated San Francisco and Saint Mary’s to be champions of the WCC tournament. They received the WCC’s automatic bid to the NCAA tournament, where they defeated Georgia State and Memphis to advance to the Sweet Sixteen, where they lost to Arkansas.

== Previous season ==
In a season limited due to the ongoing COVID-19 pandemic, the Bulldogs finished the 2020–21 season 31–1 and 15–0 in WCC play to win the regular season championship. They defeated Saint Mary's and BYU in the WCC tournament to win the tournament championship and receive the conference's automatic bid to the NCAA tournament. It was their 22nd straight trip to the NCAA Tournament. The Zags became the first Division I men's team since Kentucky in 2015 to enter the NCAA Tournament without a loss. They received the No. 1 seed in the West region where they beat Norfolk State, Oklahoma, Creighton, and USC to advance to the Final Four. There they defeated UCLA to become the first undefeated team to advance to the national championship game since Indiana State in 1979. The Bulldogs lost their first game of the season to Baylor in the championship game, denying the Bulldogs a perfect season.

== Offseason ==
=== Coaching changes ===
==== Departures ====
Name	Position	Year at Gonzaga	Alma mater (year)	Reason for departure
Tommy Lloyd	Associate head coach	20th	Whitman (1998)	Head coach at Arizona
Ken Nakagawa	Video coordinator	5th	Long Beach State (2014)	Director of Advanced Scouting at Arizona

==== Additions to staff ====
Name	Position	Year at Gonzaga	Alma mater (year)	Previous Job
Stephen Gentry	Assistant coach	1st	Gonzaga (2006)	Assistant coach at Illinois
Kurt Bambauer	Video coordinator	1st	Gonzaga (2017)	Video Coordinator at Vanderbilt

=== Player departures ===
Due to COVID-19, the NCAA ruled in October 2020 that the 2020–21 season would not count against the eligibility of any basketball player, thus giving all players the option to return in 2021–22. This in turn meant that seniors in the 2020–21 season had to declare themselves eligible for the 2021 NBA draft.

Name	Number	Pos.	Height	Weight	Year	Hometown	Reason for departure
Aaron Cook Jr.	4	G	6'1"	180	Senior (redshirt)	St. Louis, MO	Transferred to Georgia
Corey Kispert	24	F	6'7"	220	Senior	Edmonds, WA	Graduated; declared for 2021 NBA draft; selected 15th overall by the Washington Wizards
Joël Ayayi	11	G	6'5"	180	Junior (redshirt)	Bordeaux, France	Declared for 2021 NBA draft; undrafted
Pavel Zakharov	10	F	7'0"	235	Sophomore	St. Petersburg, Russia	Transferred to California Baptist
Oumar Ballo	21	C	7'0"	260	Freshman (redshirt)	Koulikoro, Mali	Transferred to Arizona
Jalen Suggs	1	G	6'4"	205	Freshman	West St. Paul, MN	Declared for 2021 NBA draft; selected 5th overall by the Orlando Magic
Evan Inglesby	32	G	6'4"	200	Freshman	Gresham, OR	Walk-on; left team

=== Incoming transfers ===
Name	Number	Pos.	Height	Weight	Year	Hometown	Previous school	Years remaining	Date eligible
Rasir Bolton	45	G	6'3"	185	Senior	Petersburg, VA	Iowa State	2	October 1, 2021

=== 2021 recruiting class ===
College recruiting
Name	Hometown	School	Height	Weight	Commit date
Kaden Perry #8 C	Battle Ground, WA	Battle Ground	6 ft 9 in (2.06 m)	225 lb (102 kg)	Jun 27, 2019
Kaden Perry #8 C	Recruit ratings: Rivals: 247Sports: ESPN: (84)				
Hunter Sallis #2 CG	Omaha, NE	Millard North	6 ft 5 in (1.96 m)	175 lb (79 kg)	Mar 26, 2021
Hunter Sallis #2 CG	Recruit ratings: Rivals: 247Sports: ESPN: (93)				
Chet Holmgren #1 C	Minneapolis, MN	Minnehaha	7 ft 0 in (2.13 m)	195 lb (88 kg)	Apr 19, 2021
Chet Holmgren #1 C	Recruit ratings: Rivals: 247Sports: ESPN: (97)				
Nolan Hickman #6 PG	Seattle, WA	Wasatch Academy	6 ft 2 in (1.88 m)	185 lb (84 kg)	May 15, 2021
Nolan Hickman #6 PG	Recruit ratings: Rivals: 247Sports: ESPN: (90)				
Overall recruit ranking: Rivals: 4 247Sports: 5 ESPN: 5
Note: In many cases, Scout, Rivals, 247Sports, On3, and ESPN may conflict in their listings of height and weight.; In these cases, the average was taken. ESPN grades are on a 100-point scale.; Sources: "Gonzaga 2021 Basketball Commitments". Rivals.; "2021 Gonzaga Bulldogs Recruiting Class". ESPN.; "2021 Team Ranking". Rivals.

== Preseason ==
=== Mark Few arrest and suspension ===
On September 6, 2021, head coach Mark Few was pulled over by police and arrested for driving under the influence in Coeur d'Alene, Idaho. Few refused sobriety tests on the scene, but was shown to have a blood alcohol level of .119 and .120 from breath tests, well over the legal limit of .08. He later apologized for the incident and pleaded guilty to misdemeanor DUI. The school suspended Few for three games for his actions. However, the suspension notably included two exhibition games and the first game of the regular season, meaning he was able to coach the November 13 game against No. 5 Texas.

=== Preseason rankings ===
Gonzaga was a near-unanimous selection as the No. 1 team in the country in the preseason AP and Coaches poll.

== Roster ==
2021–22 Gonzaga Bulldogs men's basketball team
Players
Coaches

Pos.	#	Name	Height	Weight	Year	Previous school	Hometown
G	23	Matthew Lang	6 ft 3 in (1.91 m)	185 lb (84 kg)	Sr	Jesuit	Portland, OR
G	35	Will Graves (W)	6 ft 5 in (1.96 m)	185 lb (84 kg)	Sr	South Eugene; Lane CC	Eugene, OR
G	3	Andrew Nembhard	6 ft 5 in (1.96 m)	193 lb (88 kg)	Sr	Montverde Academy; Florida	Aurora, ON
G	45	Rasir Bolton	6 ft 3 in (1.91 m)	185 lb (84 kg)	Sr	Massanutten Military Academy; Penn State; Iowa State	Petersburg, VA
F	22	Anton Watson	6 ft 8 in (2.03 m)	225 lb (102 kg)	Jr	Gonzaga Prep	Spokane, WA
G	5	Martynas Arlauskas	6 ft 7 in (2.01 m)	205 lb (93 kg)	Jr	President Valdas Adamkus Gymnasium	Kaunas, Lithuania
F	2	Drew Timme	6 ft 10 in (2.08 m)	235 lb (107 kg)	Jr	Pearce	Richardson, TX
G	55	Dominick Harris (redshirt)	6 ft 3 in (1.91 m)	190 lb (86 kg)	So	Rancho Christian	Murrieta, CA
G	0	Julian Strawther	6 ft 7 in (2.01 m)	205 lb (93 kg)	So	Liberty HS	Las Vegas, NV
F	30	Abe Eagle (W) (redshirt)	6 ft 9 in (2.06 m)	225 lb (102 kg)	So	Chaminade Prep	Los Angeles, CA
F	25	Colby Brooks (W) (redshirt)	6 ft 7 in (2.01 m)	210 lb (95 kg)	So	Loyola HS	Los Angeles, CA
F	33	Ben Gregg	6 ft 10 in (2.08 m)	225 lb (102 kg)	Fr	Clackamas	Clackamas, OR
F	20	Kaden Perry	6 ft 9 in (2.06 m)	225 lb (102 kg)	Fr	Battle Ground	Battle Ground, WA
G	10	Hunter Sallis	6 ft 5 in (1.96 m)	175 lb (79 kg)	Fr	Millard North	Omaha, NE
C	34	Chet Holmgren	7 ft 0 in (2.13 m)	195 lb (88 kg)	Fr	Minnehaha	Minneapolis, MN
G	11	Nolan Hickman	6 ft 2 in (1.88 m)	185 lb (84 kg)	Fr	Wasatch Academy	Seattle, WA
G	15	Joe Few (W)	6 ft 0 in (1.83 m)	160 lb (73 kg)	Fr	Gonzaga Prep	Spokane, WA

Head coach

- Mark Few (Oregon)

Assistant coach(es)

- Brian Michaelson (Gonzaga)
- Roger Powell Jr. (Illinois)
- Stephen Gentry (Gonzaga)

Legend

- (C) Team captain
- (S) Suspended
- (I) Ineligible
- (W) Walk-on
- Injured
- Current redshirt

Roster
Last update: January 27, 2022

- Roster is subject to change as/if players transfer or leave the program for other reasons.
- Matthew Lang was awarded a basketball scholarship for the second semester of the 2021–22 season.

=== Coaching staff ===
Name	Position	Year at Gonzaga	Alma mater (year)
Mark Few	Head coach	23rd	Oregon (1987)
Brian Michaelson	Assistant coach	9th	Gonzaga (2005)
Roger Powell Jr.	Assistant coach	3rd	Illinois (2005)
Stephen Gentry	Assistant coach	1st	Gonzaga (2006)
Jorge Sanz	Director of basketball operations	4th	Florida Atlantic (2011)
Kurt Bambauer	Video coordinator	1st	Gonzaga (2017)
Gary Bell Jr.	Coordinator of basketball administration	3rd	Gonzaga (2015)
Josh Therrien	Athletic trainer	6th	Washington State (2007)
Travis Knight	Strength & conditioning coach	16th	Gonzaga (2000)

== Schedule and results ==
Date time, TV	Rank^{#}	Opponent^{#}	Result	Record	High points	High rebounds	High assists	Site (attendance) city, state
Exhibition
October 31, 2021*; 1:00 p.m., SWX	No. 1	Eastern Oregon	W 115–62		18 – Strawther	9 – Strawther	4 – Hickman	McCarthey Athletic Center (6,000); Spokane, WA
November 5, 2021*; 6:00 p.m., KHQ	No. 1	vs. Lewis–Clark State	W 112–62		25 – Timme	8 – Timme	3 – Tied	McCarthey Athletic Center (6,000); Spokane, WA
Non-conference regular season
November 9, 2021*; 6:00 p.m., KHQ/RTNW	No. 1	Dixie State	W 97–63	1–0	17 – Strawther	13 – Holmgren	7 – Watson	McCarthey Athletic Center (6,000); Spokane, WA
November 13, 2021*; 7:30 p.m., ESPN2	No. 1	No. 5 Texas	W 86–74	2–0	37 – Timme	7 – Timme	8 – Nembhard	McCarthey Athletic Center (6,000); Spokane, WA
November 15, 2021*; 6:00 p.m., KHQ/RTNW	No. 1	Alcorn State	W 84–57	3–0	18 – Strawther	6 – Holmgren	6 – Timme	McCarthey Athletic Center (6,000); Spokane, WA
November 19, 2021*; 6:00 p.m., KHQ/RTNW	No. 1	Bellarmine	W 92–50	4–0	25 – Timme	6 – Tied	7 – Nembhard	McCarthey Athletic Center (6,000); Spokane, WA
November 22, 2021*; 7:00 p.m., ESPNU	No. 1	vs. Central Michigan; Empire Classic	W 107–54	5–0	19 – Holmgren	7 – Sallis	5 – Bolton	T-Mobile Arena (7,029); Paradise, NV
November 23, 2021*; 7:00 p.m., ESPN	No. 1	vs. No. 2 UCLA; Empire Classic	W 83–63	6–0	24 – Nembhard	9 – Strawther	6 – Nembhard	T-Mobile Arena (12,795); Paradise, NV
November 26, 2021*; 7:30 p.m., ESPN	No. 1	vs. No. 5 Duke; Continental Tire Challenge	L 81–84	6–1	20 – Strawther	10 – Strawther	11 – Nembhard	T-Mobile Arena (20,389); Paradise, NV
November 29, 2021*; 7:00 p.m., KHQ/RTNW	No. 3	Tarleton State	W 64–55	7–1	17 – Bolton	12 – Strawther	2 – Tied	McCarthey Athletic Center (6,000); Spokane, WA
December 4, 2021*; 5:00 p.m., ESPN2	No. 3	vs. No. 16 Alabama; Battle in Seattle	L 82–91	7–2	23 – Timme	11 – Holmgren	4 – Tied	Climate Pledge Arena (18,048); Seattle, WA
December 9, 2021*; 6:00 p.m., KHQ/RTNW+	No. 5	Merrimack	W 80–55	8–2	22 – Timme	15 – Holmgren	5 – Watson	McCarthey Athletic Center (6,000); Spokane, WA
December 12, 2021*; 2:00 p.m., ESPN	No. 5	Washington; Rivalry	Canceled due to COVID-19 protocols from Washington					McCarthey Athletic Center; Spokane, WA
December 18, 2021*; 10:00 a.m., CBS	No. 5	vs. No. 25 Texas Tech; Jerry Colangelo Classic	W 69–55	9–2	16 – Nembhard	11 – Holmgren	6 – Nembhard	Footprint Center (7,821); Phoenix, AZ
December 20, 2021*; 6:00 p.m., KHQ/RTNW	No. 4	Northern Arizona	W 95–49	10–2	20 – Holmgren	9 – Holmgren	3 – Tied	McCarthey Athletic Center (6,000); Spokane, WA
December 28, 2021*; 2:00 p.m., KHQ/RTNW	No. 4	North Alabama	W 93–63	11–2	15 – Strawther	10 – Watson	3 – Timme	McCarthey Athletic Center (6,000); Spokane, WA
WCC regular season
January 1, 2022; 4:00 p.m., KHQ/RTNW+	No. 4	at Loyola Marymount	Canceled					Gersten Pavilion; Los Angeles, CA
January 8, 2022; 6:00 p.m., KHQ/RTNW+	No. 2	Pepperdine	W 117–83	12–2 (1–0)	19 – Watson	8 – Holmgren	8 – Nembhard	McCarthey Athletic Center (6,000); Spokane, WA
January 13, 2022; 8:00 p.m., ESPN2	No. 2	BYU; Rivalry	W 110–84	13–2 (2–0)	30 – Timme	7 – Holmgren	12 – Nembhard	McCarthey Athletic Center (6,000); Spokane, WA
January 15, 2022; 1:00 p.m., KAYU/RTNW+	No. 2	at Santa Clara	W 115–83	14–2 (3–0)	32 – Timme	12 – Holmgren	7 – Bolton	Leavey Center (1,100); Santa Clara, CA
January 20, 2022; 6:00 p.m., KHQ/RTNW+	No. 1	at Pacific	Canceled					Alex G. Spanos Center; Stockton, CA
January 20, 2022; 8:00 p.m., CBSSN	No. 1	San Francisco	W 78–62	15–2 (4–0)	23 – Timme	9 – Holmgren	7 – Nembhard	McCarthey Athletic Center (6,000); Spokane, WA
January 27, 2022; 8:00 p.m., CBSSN	No. 2	Loyola Marymount	W 89–55	16–2 (5–0)	21 – Holmgren	9 – Holmgren	5 – Bolton	McCarthey Athletic Center (6,000); Spokane, WA
January 29, 2022; 6:00 p.m., KHQ/RTNW	No. 2	Portland	W 104–72	17–2 (6–0)	22 – Nembhard	11 – Holmgren	4 – Tied	McCarthey Athletic Center (6,000); Spokane, WA
February 3, 2022; 6:00 p.m., ESPN2	No. 2	at San Diego	W 92–62	18–2 (7–0)	23 – Holmgren	12 – Holmgren	7 – Nembhard	Jenny Craig Pavilion (5,433); San Diego, CA
February 5, 2022; 7:00 p.m., ESPN	No. 2	at BYU; Rivalry	W 90–57	19–2 (8–0)	20 – Holmgren	17 – Holmgren	6 – Holmgren	Marriott Center (18,987); Provo, UT
February 10, 2022; 6:00 p.m., CBSSN	No. 2	Pacific	W 89–51	20–2 (9–0)	20 – Bolton	10 – Timme	3 – Tied	McCarthey Athletic Center (6,000); Spokane, WA
February 12, 2022; 7:00 p.m., ESPN2	No. 2	No. 22 Saint Mary's; Rivalry	W 74–58	21–2 (10–0)	25 – Timme	13 – Holmgren	7 – Nembhard	McCarthey Athletic Center (6,000); Spokane, WA
February 16, 2022; 8:00 p.m., ESPN2	No. 1	at Pepperdine	W 86–66	22–2 (11–0)	19 – Timme	17 – Holmgren	14 – Nembhard	Firestone Fieldhouse (2,412); Malibu, CA
February 19, 2022; 6:00 p.m., KHQ/RTNW	No. 1	Santa Clara	W 81–69	23–2 (12–0)	23 – Timme	10 – Holmgren	8 – Nembhard	McCarthey Athletic Center (6,000); Spokane, WA
February 24, 2022; 6:00 p.m., ESPN2	No. 1	at San Francisco	W 89–73	24–2 (13–0)	21 – Holmgren	15 – Holmgren	8 – Timme	War Memorial Gymnasium (3,138); San Francisco, CA
February 26, 2022; 7:00 p.m., ESPN	No. 1	at No. 23 Saint Mary's; Rivalry	L 57–67	24–3 (13–1)	16 – Bolton	8 – Timme	2 – Timme	University Credit Union Pavilion (3,500); Moraga, CA
WCC Tournament
March 7, 2022; 6:00 p.m., ESPN	(1) No. 1	vs. (4) San Francisco; Semifinals	W 81–71	25–3	22 – Timme	10 – Watson	9 – Nembhard	Orleans Arena; Paradise, NV
March 8, 2022; 6:00 p.m., ESPN	(1) No. 1	vs. (2) No. 17 Saint Mary's; Championship	W 82–69	26–3	21 – Nembhard	8 – Holmgren	7 – Nembhard	Orleans Arena; Paradise, NV
NCAA tournament
March 17, 2022*; 1:15 pm, TNT	(1 W) No. 1	vs. (16 W) Georgia State; First Round	W 93–72	27–3	32 – Timme	17 – Holmgren	11 – Nembhard	Moda Center (14,343); Portland, OR
March 19, 2022*; 6:40 p.m., TBS	(1 W) No. 1	vs. (9 W) Memphis; Second Round	W 82–78	28–3	25 – Timme	14 – Timme	5 – Nembhard	Moda Center (17,907); Portland, OR
March 24, 2022*; 4:00 p.m., CBS	(1 W) No. 1	vs. (4 W) No. 17 Arkansas; Sweet Sixteen	L 68–74	28–4	25 – Timme	14 – Holmgren	3 – Tied	Chase Center (17,514); San Francisco, CA
*Non-conference game. ^{#}Rankings from AP Poll. (#) Tournament seedings in parentheses. W=West. All times are in Pacific Time.

== Rankings ==
Ranking movements Legend: ██ Increase in ranking ██ Decrease in ranking т = Tied with team above or below ( ) = First-place votes
	Week																		
Poll	Pre	1	2	3	4	5	6	7	8	9	10	11	12	13	14	15	16	17	Final
AP	1 (55)	1 (55)	1 (55)	3 (1)	5	5	4	4	2	1 (25)	2 (13)	2 (12)	2 (13)	1 (56)	1 (61)	1 (46)	1 (52)	1 (54)	Not released
Coaches	1 (29)	^	1 (30)	3	5	4т	4т	4	2	1 (23)	1 (18)	1т (16)	1 (18)	1 (30)	1 (32)	1 (20)	1 (27)	1 (31)	5

*AP does not release post-NCAA Tournament rankings.
^Coaches did not release a Week 1 poll.
