= 2021–22 San Francisco Dons men's basketball team =

American college basketball season

2021–22 San Francisco Dons men's basketball
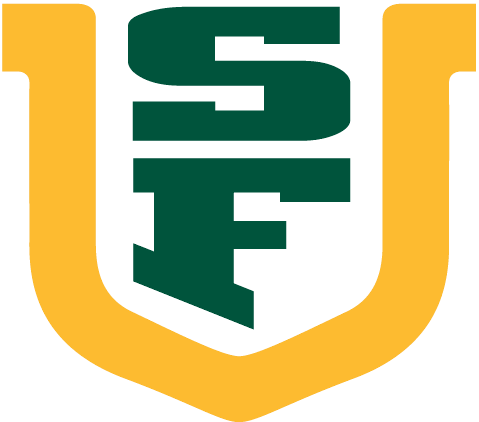

Las Vegas Invitational champions

NCAA tournament, First Round
- Conference: West Coast Conference
- Record: 24–10 (10–6 WCC)
- Head coach: Todd Golden (3rd season)
- Assistant coaches: Chris Gerlufsen; Michael Plank; Jonathan Safir; Vinnie McGhee
- Home arena: War Memorial Gymnasium (Capacity: 3,005)

2021–22 West Coast Conference men's basketball standings
	Conf.				Overall
Team	W		L	PCT	W		L	PCT
No. 1 Gonzaga †	13	–	1	.929	28	–	4	.875
No. 18 Saint Mary's	12	–	3	.800	26	–	8	.765
Santa Clara	10	–	5	.667	21	–	12	.636
San Francisco	10	–	6	.625	24	–	10	.706
BYU	9	–	6	.600	24	–	11	.686
Portland	7	–	7	.500	19	–	15	.559
San Diego	7	–	9	.438	15	–	16	.484
Pacific	3	–	11	.214	8	–	22	.267
Loyola Marymount	3	–	12	.200	11	–	18	.379
Pepperdine	1	–	15	.063	7	–	25	.219
† 2022 WCC tournament winner Rankings from AP poll

The 2021–22 San Francisco Dons men's basketball team represented the University of San Francisco during the 2021–22 NCAA Division I men's basketball season. The Dons were led by third-year head coach Todd Golden, and played their home games at the War Memorial Gymnasium at the Sobrato Center as members of the West Coast Conference.

USF began the season at 10–0, which marked the program's best start to a season since they opened with 26 straight wins in 1976–77. The Dons' perfect season ended with a one-point loss to Grand Canyon on December 18; they ultimately wrapped up their non-conference slate with a 13–2 record heading into WCC play.

The Dons finished conference regular season play at 10–6 and were seeded fourth in that year's WCC tournament. After a win against BYU and a loss to Gonzaga, the Dons received an at-large NCAA tournament bid, their first appearance since 1998. They were placed as a tenth seed in the East region but lost in an overtime game to seventh seed Murray State 92–87.

The day after the tournament loss, March 18, 2022, head coach Todd Golden accepted the head coach role at Florida. Chris Gerlufsen was subsequently named the next head coach.

== Previous season ==
The Dons concluded the 2020–21 season 11–14, 4–9 in WCC play to finish in fifth place. They defeated San Diego in the first round of the WCC tournament before losing to Loyola Marymount.

== Offseason ==
=== Departures ===
Name	Number	Pos.	Height	Weight	Year	Hometown	Reason for departure
Damari Milstead	11	G	6'2"	195	RS junior	Oakland, CA	Transferred to Cal State Fullerton
Trevante Anderson	12	G	6'2"	185	Junior	Tacoma, WA	Transferred to Idaho
Anthony Roy	14	G	6'3"	175	Freshman	Oakland, CA	Transferred to College of Southern Idaho
Taavi Jurkatamm	34	F	6'9"	210	Senior	Tallinn, Estonia	Graduated
Samba Kane	43	C	7'0"	220	Junior	Dakar, Senegal	Transferred to UW–Milwaukee
Emmanuel Nwabueze	45	G	6'3"	215	RS junior	San Francisco, CA	Walk-on; didn't return

=== Incoming transfers ===
Name	Number	Pos.	Height	Weight	Year	Hometown	Previous school
Volodymyr Markovetskyy	33	C	7'2"	270	Sophomore	Truskavets, Ukraine	Transferred from Washington State
Yauhen Massalski	25	F	6'10"	245	Graduate student	Minsk, Belarus	Transferred from San Diego. Was eligible to play immediately, since he graduated from San Diego.
Zane Meeks	5	F	6'9"	215	Sophomore	Prairie Village, KS	Transferred from Nevada
Gabe Stefanini	15	G	6'3"	210	Senior	Bologna, Italy	Transferred from Columbia
Patrick Tapé	11	F	6'9"	233	Graduate Student	Charlotte, NC	Transferred from Duke. Was eligible to play immediately, since he graduated from Duke.

=== 2021 recruiting class ===
College recruiting
Name	Hometown	School	Height	Weight	Commit date
Ndewedo Newbury; C	London, England	The Loomis Chaffee School	6 ft 9 in (2.06 m)	230 lb (100 kg)	Apr 21, 2021
Ndewedo Newbury; C	Recruit ratings: Scout: Rivals: (NR)				
Overall recruit ranking: Scout: NR Rivals: NR ESPN: NR
Note: In many cases, Scout, Rivals, 247Sports, On3, and ESPN may conflict in their listings of height and weight.; In these cases, the average was taken. ESPN grades are on a 100-point scale.; Sources: "San Francisco Dons 2021 Basketball Commitments". Rivals.; "2021 San Francisco Dons Basketball Commits". Scout.; "ESPN". ESPN.; "Scout.com Team Recruiting Rankings". Scout.; "2021 Team Ranking". Rivals.

=== 2022 recruiting class ===
College recruiting (2022)
Name	Hometown	School	Height	Weight	Commit date
Broyce Batchen, Jr. PG	El Sobranto, CA	Southern California Academy	6 ft 2 in (1.88 m)	N/A	Jul 21, 2021
Broyce Batchen, Jr. PG	Recruit ratings: Scout: Rivals: (NR)				
Overall recruit ranking: Scout: NR Rivals: NR ESPN: NR
Note: In many cases, Scout, Rivals, 247Sports, On3, and ESPN may conflict in their listings of height and weight.; In these cases, the average was taken. ESPN grades are on a 100-point scale.; Sources: "San Francisco Dons 2022 Basketball Commitments". Rivals.; "2022 San Francisco Dons Basketball Commits". Scout.; "ESPN". ESPN.; "Scout.com Team Recruiting Rankings". Scout.; "2022 Team Ranking". Rivals.

== Roster ==
2021–22 San Francisco Dons men's basketball team
Players
Coaches

Pos.	#	Name	Height	Weight	Year	Previous school	Hometown
G	0	Khalil Shabazz	6 ft 1 in (1.85 m)	170 lb (77 kg)	RS Sr	Central Washington	Seattle, WA
G	1	Jamaree Bouyea	6 ft 2 in (1.88 m)	180 lb (82 kg)	GS	Palma HS	Seaside, CA
G	2	Julian Rishwain	6 ft 5 in (1.96 m)	190 lb (86 kg)	So	Boston College	Los Angeles, CA
F	3	Isaiah Hawthorne	6 ft 8 in (2.03 m)	205 lb (93 kg)	RS Fr	Tracy HS	Tracy, CA
F	5	Zane Meeks	6 ft 9 in (2.06 m)	215 lb (98 kg)	So	Nevada	Prairie Village, KS
F	10	Josh Kunen	6 ft 8 in (2.03 m)	210 lb (95 kg)	So	Centre of Excellence	Melbourne, VIC, Australia
F	11	Patrick Tapé	6 ft 10 in (2.08 m)	240 lb (109 kg)	GS	Duke	Charlotte, NC
G	12	Justin Bieker (W)	6 ft 5 in (1.96 m)	180 lb (82 kg)	RS Fr	Jesuit HS	Portland, OR
F	14	Maj Dušanić	6 ft 7 in (2.01 m)	215 lb (98 kg)	Fr	Dream City Christian	Ljubljana, Slovenia
G	15	Gabe Stefanini	6 ft 3 in (1.91 m)	215 lb (98 kg)	Sr	Columbia	Bologna, Italy
F	21	Ndewedo Newbury	6 ft 7 in (2.01 m)	238 lb (108 kg)	Fr	The Loomis Chaffee School	London, England, UK
F	22	Dzmitry Ryuny	6 ft 9 in (2.06 m)	205 lb (93 kg)	Jr	Central Park Christian	Minsk, Belarus
F	25	Yauhen Massalski	6 ft 9 in (2.06 m)	240 lb (109 kg)	GS	San Diego	Minsk, Belarus
G	30	Bryce Whitaker (W)	6 ft 0 in (1.83 m)	170 lb (77 kg)	So	Lamar CC	Los Angeles, CA
C	31	Jonas Visser	6 ft 10 in (2.08 m)	240 lb (109 kg)	So	Centre for Sports & Education	Amsterdam, Netherlands
C	33	Volodymyr Markovetskyy	7 ft 2 in (2.18 m)	270 lb (122 kg)	So	Washington State	Truskavets, Ukraine
G	45	Jake Cioe (W)	6 ft 0 in (1.83 m)	175 lb (79 kg)	Fr	Salpointe Catholic HS	Tucson, AZ

Head coach

- Todd Golden (Saint Mary's)

Assistant coach(es)

- Chris Gerlufsen (Randolph–Macon)
- Michael Plank (Willamette)
- Jonathan Safir (Columbia)
- Vinnie McGhee (Cal State Northridge)

Legend

- (C) Team captain
- (S) Suspended
- (I) Ineligible
- (W) Walk-on
- Injured
- Current redshirt

Roster
Last update: 29 December 2021

== Schedule and results ==
Date time, TV	Rank^{#}	Opponent^{#}	Result	Record	High points	High rebounds	High assists	Site (attendance) city, state
Non-conference regular season
November 9, 2021*; 7:30 p.m., WCC Network		LIU	W 98–64	1–0	16 – Shabazz	6 – Kunen	4 – Tapé	War Memorial Gymnasium (1,439); San Francisco, CA
November 11, 2021*; 7:30 p.m., WCC Network		Prairie View A&M	W 92–76	2–0	24 – Bouyea	6 – Massalski	4 – Tied	War Memorial Gymnasium (1,233); San Francisco, CA
November 13, 2021*; 5:30 p.m., WCC Network		vs. Davidson; Chase Center Showcase	W 65–60	3–0	14 – Bouyea	7 – Massalski	4 – Tied	Chase Center (4,175); San Francisco, CA
November 15, 2021*; 6:00 p.m., WCC Network		Samford	W 77–55	4–0	19 – Bouyea	10 – Shabazz	6 – Bouyea	War Memorial Gymnasium (1,033); San Francisco, CA
November 18, 2021*; 7:30 p.m., Stadium		Nevada	W 73–70	5–0	28 – Stefanini	7 – Bouyea	4 – Bouyea	War Memorial Gymnasium (1,690); San Francisco, CA
November 22, 2021*; 6:00 p.m., WCC Network		Morgan State	W 83–67	6–0	22 – Bouyea	9 – Kunen	7 – Bouyea	War Memorial Gymnasium (1,689); San Francisco, CA
November 25, 2021*; 6:30 p.m., FS1		vs. Towson; Las Vegas Invitational semifinals	W 71–61	7–0	20 – Bouyea	9 – Bouyea	5 – Bouyea	Orleans Arena; Paradise, NV
November 26, 2021*; 8:30 p.m., FS1		vs. UAB; Las Vegas Invitational championship	W 63–61	8–0	23 – Massalski	13 – Massalski	3 – Shabazz	Orleans Arena; Paradise, NV
December 4, 2021*; 7:00 p.m., WCC Network		UNLV	W 83–62	9–0	30 – Bouyea	16 – Massalski	6 – Shabazz	War Memorial Gymnasium (1,327); San Francisco, CA
December 8, 2021*; 7:00 p.m., WCC Network		Fresno State	W 71–63	10–0	27 – Bouyea	6 – Bouyea	3 – Bouyea	War Memorial Gymnasium (1,873); San Francisco, CA
December 18, 2021*; 4:30 p.m., FloSports		vs. Grand Canyon; Jerry Colangelo Classic	L 48–49	10–1	18 – Massalski	13 – Massalski	3 – Tied	Footprint Center (1,578); Phoenix, AZ
December 19, 2021*; 3:00 p.m., P12N		at Arizona State	W 66–65	11–1	20 – Shabazz	9 – Massalski	6 – Bouyea	Desert Financial Arena (6,403); Tempe, AZ
December 22, 2021*; 2:00 p.m., WCC Network		Southern Illinois	W 64–52	12–1	20 – Bouyea	9 – Massalski	5 – Bouyea	War Memorial Gymnasium (1,543); San Francisco, CA
December 28, 2021*; 6:00 p.m., WCC Network		Academy of Art	W 111–78	13–1	18 – Tied	9 – Massalski	4 – Tied	War Memorial Gymnasium (1,099); San Francisco, CA
January 6, 2022*; 11:00 a.m., WCC Network		vs. Loyola–Chicago	L 74–79	13–2	20 – Massalski	5 – Tied	4 – Bouyea	Lifetime Activities Center (112); Salt Lake City, UT
WCC regular season
January 8, 2022; 4:00 p.m., NBCSBA		San Diego	W 88–73	14–2 (1–0)	27 – Shabazz	17 – Massalski	6 – Stefanini	War Memorial Gymnasium (1,487); San Francisco, CA
January 13, 2022; 8:00 p.m., CBSSN		Loyola Marymount	W 97–73	15–2 (2–0)	22 – Bouyea	8 – Massalski	6 – Shabazz	War Memorial Gymnasium (1,160); San Francisco, CA
January 15, 2022; 8:00 p.m., CBSSN		BYU	L 69–71	15–3 (2–1)	19 – Bouyea	7 – Tied	3 – Stefanini	War Memorial Gymnasium (2,133); San Francisco, CA
January 20, 2022; 8:00 p.m., CBSSN		at No. 1 Gonzaga	L 62–78	15–4 (2–2)	25 – Bouyea	10 – Massalski	2 – Tied	McCarthey Athletic Center (6,000); Spokane, WA
January 22, 2022; 4:30 p.m., NBCSBA		at Pepperdine	W 71–45	16–4 (3–2)	20 – Rishwain	10 – Massalski	3 – Tied	Firestone Fieldhouse (515); Malibu, CA
January 27, 2022; 7:00 p.m., Stadium		Saint Mary's	L 70–72	16–5 (3–3)	19 – Bouyea	13 – Massalski	4 – Bouyea	War Memorial Gymnasium (2,833); San Francisco, CA
January 29, 2022; 4:00 p.m., Stadium		Santa Clara	W 88–85	17–5 (4–3)	25 – Bouyea	16 – Massalski	4 – Stefanini	War Memorial Gymnasium (3,010); San Francisco, CA
February 3, 2022; 7:00 p.m., CBSSN		at BYU	W 73–59	18–5 (5–3)	16 – Massalski	13 – Massalski	4 – Bouyea	Marriott Center (13,361); Provo, UT
February 5, 2022; 5:00 p.m., WCC Network		at Portland	W 74–71	19–5 (6–3)	22 – Massalski	12 – Massalski	7 – Bouyea	Chiles Center (1,206); Portland, OR
February 8, 2022; 7:00 p.m., WCC Network		Portland	L 68–69	19–6 (6–4)	18 – Stefanini	20 – Massalski	4 – Bouyea	War Memorial Gymnasium (1,827); San Francisco, CA
February 10, 2022; 8:00 p.m., NBCSCA		Pepperdine	W 105–61	20–6 (7–4)	24 – Shabazz	10 – Massalski	6 – Stefanini	War Memorial Gymnasium (2,321); San Francisco, CA
February 12, 2022; 3:00 p.m., Stadium		at Santa Clara	W 74–58	21–6 (8–4)	19 – Massalski	10 – Massalski	5 – Shabazz	Leavey Center (2,011); Santa Clara, CA
February 17, 2022; 7:00 p.m., NBCSBA+		at Saint Mary's; Rescheduled from Jan. 1	L 64–69	21–7 (8–5)	23 – Stefanini	10 – Massalski	4 – Stefanini	University Credit Union Pavilion (3,500); Moraga, CA
February 21, 2022; 6:00 p.m., WCC Network		at Pacific; Rescheduled from Feb. 15	W 104–71	22–7 (9–5)	21 – Shabazz	7 – Markovetskyy	11 – Bouyea	Alex G. Spanos Center (1,227); Stockton, CA
February 24, 2022; 6:00 p.m., ESPN2		No. 1 Gonzaga	L 73–89	22–8 (9–6)	17 – Shabazz	8 – Massalski	5 – Bouyea	War Memorial Gymnasium (3,138); San Francisco, CA
February 26, 2022; 2:00 p.m., NBCSBA		at San Diego	W 78–62	23–8 (10–6)	18 – Rishwain	8 – Massalski	6 – Bouyea	Jenny Craig Pavilion (1,144); San Diego, CA
WCC tournament
March 5, 2022; 7:30 p.m, ESPN2	(4)	vs. (5) BYU; Third round	W 75–63	24–8	22 – Shabazz	9 – Massalski	4 – Bouyea	Orleans Arena (1,799); Paradise, NV
March 7, 2022; 6:00 pm, ESPN	(4)	vs. (1) No. 1 Gonzaga; Semifinals	L 71–81	24–9	27 – Shabazz	8 – Rishwain	3 – Kunen	Orleans Arena; Paradise, NV
NCAA tournament
March 17, 2022; 6:40 p.m, CBS	(10 E)	vs. (7 E) No. 20 Murray State; First Round	L 87–92 ^{OT}	24–10	36 – Bouyea	7 – Kunen	3 – tied	Gainbridge Fieldhouse (16,828); Indianapolis, IN
*Non-conference game. ^{#}Rankings from AP Poll. (#) Tournament seedings in parentheses. All times are in Pacific Time.
