= 2021–22 San Diego Toreros men's basketball team =

American college basketball season

2021–22 San Diego Toreros men's basketball
- Conference: West Coast Conference
- Record: 15–16 (7–9 WCC)
- Head coach: Sam Scholl (4th season)
- Assistant coaches: Martin Bahar; Jerry Brown; Mitch Charlens
- Home arena: Jenny Craig Pavilion

2021–22 West Coast Conference men's basketball standings
| | Conf. | | | | Overall |
| Team | W | | L | PCT | W | | L | PCT |
|---|---|---|---|---|---|---|---|---|
| No. 1 Gonzaga † | 13 | – | 1 | .929 | 28 | – | 4 | .875 |
| No. 18 Saint Mary's | 12 | – | 3 | .800 | 26 | – | 8 | .765 |
| Santa Clara | 10 | – | 5 | .667 | 21 | – | 12 | .636 |
| San Francisco | 10 | – | 6 | .625 | 24 | – | 10 | .706 |
| BYU | 9 | – | 6 | .600 | 24 | – | 11 | .686 |
| Portland | 7 | – | 7 | .500 | 19 | – | 15 | .559 |
| San Diego | 7 | – | 9 | .438 | 15 | – | 16 | .484 |
| Pacific | 3 | – | 11 | .214 | 8 | – | 22 | .267 |
| Loyola Marymount | 3 | – | 12 | .200 | 11 | – | 18 | .379 |
| Pepperdine | 1 | – | 15 | .063 | 7 | – | 25 | .219 |
† 2022 WCC tournament winner Rankings from AP poll

The 2021–22 San Diego Toreros men's basketball team represented the University of San Diego during the 2021–22 NCAA Division I men's basketball season. The Toreros were led by head coach Sam Scholl who was in his fourth and final year at that time. They played their home games at the Jenny Craig Pavilion in San Diego, California, as members of the West Coast Conference (WCC). They finished the season 15–16, 7–9 in WCC play, and got the seventh place. They defeated Pepperdine in the first round of the WCC tournament before losing to Portland in the second round.

On March 6, 2022, the school fired head coach Sam Scholl. The school hired former UCLA and St. John's head coach Steve Lavin on April 8, as the team's new head coach. Lavin had not coached any team since 2015.

== Previous season ==
In a season limited due to the ongoing COVID-19 pandemic, the Toreros finished the 2020–21 season 3–11, 2–7, 9th place in the WCC play. They lost in the first round of the WCC tournament to San Francisco.

== Offseason ==
=== Departures ===
| Name | Number | Pos. | Height | Weight | Year | Hometown | Reason for departure |
|---|---|---|---|---|---|---|---|
| Marion Humphrey | 0 | G | 6'2" | 185 | RS Sophomore | Hoover, AL | Transferred to Salt Lake CC |
| Frankie Hughes | 3 | G | 6'4" | 195 | RS Junior | Cleveland, OH | Graduate transferred to Slippery Rock |
| Finn Sullivan | 5 | G | 6'4" | 175 | Junior | San Diego, CA | Transferred to Vermont |
| Mikal Gjerde | 10 | F | 6'7" | 200 | Sophomore | Haugesund, Norway | Transferred to Rockhurst |
| Jared Rodriguez | 20 | F | 6'7" | 205 | RS Junior | Glendale, AZ | Transferred to Idaho State |
| Chris Herren Jr. | 24 | G | 6'3" | 175 | Junior | Portsmouth, RI | Left the team for personal reasons |
| Yauhen Massalski | 25 | F | 6'10" | 245 | Senior | Minsk, Belarus | Graduate transferred to San Francisco |
| Jason Gallant | 31 | G | 6'2" | 180 | RS Freshman | La Cañada, CA | Transferred to Colorado Christian |
| Ben Pyle | 33 | F | 6'7" | 185 | Junior | McPherson, KS | Transferred to McPherson |
| Jack Vaske | 40 | F | 6'10" | 195 | Freshman | New Canaan, CT | Did not return |

=== Incoming transfers ===
| Name | Number | Pos. | Height | Weight | Year | Hometown | Previous school |
|---|---|---|---|---|---|---|---|
| Bryce Monroe | 0 | G | 5'11" | 170 | Sophomore | San Francisco, CA | Transferred from Sam Houston State |
| Jase Townsend | 1 | G | 6'3" | 175 | Senior | Dallas, TX | Transferred from Denver |
| Marcellus Earlington | 10 | G/F | 6'6" | 240 | Senior | Stony Point, NY | Transferred from St. John's |
| T. J. Berger | 20 | G | 6'4" | 170 | Sophomore | West Chester, PA | Transferred from Georgetown |
| Terrell Brown | 21 | F/C | 6'10" | 235 | GS Senior | Providence, RI | Graduate transferred from Pittsburgh |

=== 2021 recruiting class ===
College recruiting information
| Name | Hometown | School | Height | Weight | Commit date |
|---|---|---|---|---|---|
| Wayne McKinney; PG | San Diego, CA | Coronado High School | 6 ft 0 in (1.83 m) | 185 lb (84 kg) | Jul 30, 2020 |
| Wayne McKinney; PG | Recruit ratings: Scout: Rivals: 247Sports: (NR) | | | | |
| Alijah Kuehl; C | Jacksonville, FL | Bartram Trail High School | 6 ft 10 in (2.08 m) | 220 lb (100 kg) | Sep 27, 2020 |
| Alijah Kuehl; C | Recruit ratings: Scout: Rivals: 247Sports: (NR) | | | | |
| Muon Reath; SF | Ottawa, ON | Toronto Basketball Academy | 6 ft 8 in (2.03 m) | 175 lb (79 kg) | Jun 15, 2021 |
| Muon Reath; SF | Recruit ratings: Scout: Rivals: 247Sports: (NR) | | | | |
Overall recruit ranking: Scout: nr Rivals: nr ESPN: nr
Note: In many cases, Scout, Rivals, 247Sports, On3, and ESPN may conflict in their listings of height and weight.; In these cases, the average was taken. ESPN grades are on a 100-point scale.; Sources: "San Diego Toreros 2021 Basketball Commitments". Rivals.; "2021 San Diego Toreros Basketball Commits". Scout.; "ESPN 2021 San Diego Toreros Basketball recruits". ESPN.; "Scout.com Team Recruiting Rankings". Scout.; "2021 Team Ranking". Rivals.

== Roster ==
2021–22 San Diego Toreros men's basketball team
Players
Coaches

| Pos. | # | Name | Height | Weight | Year | Previous school | Hometown |
|---|---|---|---|---|---|---|---|
| G | 0 | Bryce Monroe | 5 ft 11 in (1.8 m) | 170 lb (77 kg) | So | Archbishop Riordan HS; Sam Houston State | San Francisco, CA |
| G | 1 | Jase Townsend | 6 ft 3 in (1.91 m) | 175 lb (79 kg) | Sr | Skyline HS; Denver | Dallas, TX |
| G | 2 | Joey Calcaterra | 6 ft 3 in (1.91 m) | 165 lb (75 kg) | RS Sr | Marin Catholic HS | Novato, CA |
| G | 3 | Wayne McKinney III | 6 ft 0 in (1.83 m) | 190 lb (86 kg) | Fr | Coronado HS | Coronado, CA |
| F | 4 | Josh Parrish | 6 ft 4 in (1.93 m) | 215 lb (98 kg) | GS | Seguin HS; Rice | Arlington, TX |
| G | 5 | Scotty Prunty | 5 ft 11 in (1.8 m) | 165 lb (75 kg) | So | Cathedral Catholic HS | San Diego, CA |
| G/F | 10 | Marcellus Earlington | 6 ft 6 in (1.98 m) | 240 lb (109 kg) | Sr | Don Bosco Prep; St. John's | Stony Point, NY |
| F | 11 | Yavuz Gultekin | 6 ft 7 in (2.01 m) | 200 lb (91 kg) | Jr | Bishop Walsh HS; Texas A&M | Karşıyaka, Turkey |
| G | 13 | Dominic Muncey | 6 ft 0 in (1.83 m) | 175 lb (79 kg) | Fr | Cathedral Catholic HS | San Diego, CA |
| C | 14 | Alijah Kuehl | 6 ft 10 in (2.08 m) | 235 lb (107 kg) | Fr | Bartram Trail HS | St. Augustine, FL |
| C | 15 | Vladimir Pinchuk | 6 ft 11 in (2.11 m) | 230 lb (104 kg) | RS Sr | Maerkischies Gymnasium; New Mexico | Schwelm, Germany |
| G | 20 | T. J. Berger | 6 ft 4 in (1.93 m) | 170 lb (77 kg) | So | Westtown School; Georgetown | Malvern, PA |
| F/C | 21 | Terrell Brown | 6 ft 10 in (2.08 m) | 235 lb (107 kg) | GS | Tilton School; Pittsburgh | Providence, RI |
| G | 25 | Patrick Caero | 6 ft 4 in (1.93 m) | 195 lb (88 kg) | Fr | Trinity Valley School | Fort Worth, TX |
| G/F | 33 | Muon Reath | 6 ft 8 in (2.03 m) | 185 lb (84 kg) | Fr | Toronto Basketball Academy | Ottawa, ON |

Head coach

- Sam Scholl (San Diego)

Assistant coach(es)

- Jerry Brown (Fresno State)
- Martin Bahar (Vanderbilt)
- Mitch Charlens

Legend

- (C) Team captain
- (S) Suspended
- (I) Ineligible
- (W) Walk-on
- Injured
- Current redshirt

Roster
Last update: April 6, 2024

== Schedule and results ==
| Date time, TV | Rank^{#} | Opponent^{#} | Result | Record | High points | High rebounds | High assists | Site (attendance) city, state |
Non-conference regular season
| November 9, 2021*; 7:30 p.m. | | La Verne | W 103–38 | 1–0 | 15 – Pinchuk | 11 – Gultekin | 4 – tied | Jenny Craig Pavilion (1,012); San Diego, CA |
| November 12, 2021*; 7:00 p.m. | | at Nevada | W 75–68 | 2–0 | 18 – Townsend | 8 – Brown | 4 – Townsend | Lawlor Events Center (7,370); Reno, NV |
| November 15, 2021*; 6:00 p.m., P12N | | at California | L 70–75 | 2–1 | 16 – Townsend | 11 – Brown | 4 – Townsend | Haas Pavilion (421); Berkeley, CA |
| November 17, 2021*; 7:30 p.m. | | UC Riverside | W 74–62 | 3–1 | 21 – Calcaterra | 12 – Brown | 3 – tied | Jenny Craig Pavilion (958); San Diego, CA |
| November 19, 2021*; 7:00 p.m. | | Cal State Fullerton | L 55–57 | 3–2 | 16 – Earlington | 11 – Brown | 5 – Townsend | Jenny Craig Pavilion (1,073); San Diego, CA |
| November 25, 2021*; 10:30 a.m. | | vs. South Alabama; Las Vegas Classic semifinals | L 67–68 | 3–3 | 25 – Townsend | 12 – Pinchuk | 5 – Monroe | Orleans Arena; Paradise, NV |
| November 26, 2021*; 12:30 p.m. | | vs. UIC; Las Vegas Classic 3rd-place game | W 64–52 | 4–3 | 14 – Earlington | 8 – Calcaterra | 3 – Pinchuk | Orleans Arena; Paradise, NV |
| November 28, 2021*; 3:00 p.m. | | Cal State Northridge | L 52–56 | 4–4 | 20 – Earlington | 9 – tied | 5 – Monroe | Jenny Craig Pavilion (889); San Diego, CA |
| December 1, 2021*; 7:00 p.m. | | at Fresno State | L 43–63 | 4–5 | 11 – Pinchuk | 5 – Earlington | 3 – Calcaterra | Save Mart Center (3,132); Fresno, CA |
| December 5, 2021*; 1:00 p.m. | | Cal Poly | W 52–51 | 5–5 | 17 – McKinney III | 5 – tied | 3 – Parrish | Jenny Craig Pavilion (385); San Diego, CA |
| December 11, 2021*; 7:00 p.m. | | Cal Lutheran | W 84–55 | 6–5 | 23 – Earlington | 16 – Earlington | 5 – McKinney III | Jenny Craig Pavilion (966); San Diego, CA |
| December 18, 2021*; 7:00 p.m., FloSports | | vs. Northern Arizona; Jerry Colangelo Classic | W 69–59 | 7–5 | 22 – Earlington | 11 – Earlington | 3 – Berger | Footprint Center (1,578); Phoenix, AZ |
| December 20, 2021*; 7:00 p.m. | | Long Beach State | Canceled due to COVID-19 issues | | | | | Jenny Craig Pavilion; San Diego, CA |
| December 22, 2021*; 7:00 p.m. | | at UNLV | L 57–80 | 7–6 | 16 – Brown | 8 – Brown | 2 – Parrish | Thomas & Mack Center (4,377); Paradise, NV |
WCC regular season
| January 8, 2022; 4:00 p.m., NBCS Bay Area | | at San Francisco | L 73–88 | 7–7 (0–1) | 15 – Monroe | 10 – Brown | 4 – Monroe | War Memorial Gymnasium (1,487); San Francisco, CA |
| January 10, 2022; 7:00 p.m., WCC Network | | at Pepperdine; Rescheduled from Jan. 6 | W 72–62 | 8–7 (1–1) | 15 – Monroe | 10 – Brown | 4 – Monroe | Firestone Fieldhouse (50); Malibu, CA |
| January 13, 2022; 7:00 p.m. | | Portland | W 68–63 ^{OT} | 9–7 (2–1) | 21 – Earlington | 10 – tied | 4 – Calcaterra | Jenny Craig Pavilion; San Diego, CA |
| January 15, 2022; 6:00 p.m. | | Loyola Marymount | W 70–65 | 10–7 (3–1) | 13 – Brown | 12 – tied | 3 – McKinney III | Jenny Craig Pavilion (604); San Diego, CA |
| January 20, 2022; 6:00 p.m., BYUtv | | at BYU | L 71–79 | 10–8 (3–2) | 14 – Townsend | 7 – Earlington | 3 – Townsend | Marriott Center (12,748); Provo, UT |
| January 22, 2022; 5:30 p.m. | | at Pacific | W 73–65 | 11–8 (4–2) | 23 – Earlington | 8 – Brown | 6 – McKinney III | Alex G. Spanos Center; Stockton, CA |
| January 24, 2022; 6:00 p.m., WCC Network/BSW | | at Santa Clara; Rescheduled from Jan. 1 | L 74–78 ^{OT} | 11–9 (4–3) | 13 – tied | 10 – Brown | 3 – tied | Leavey Center (1,100); Santa Clara, CA |
| January 27, 2022; 7:30 p.m., WCC Network | | Pepperdine | W 64–56 | 12–9 (5–3) | 13 – Brown | 11 – Brown | 3 – Calcaterra | Jenny Craig Pavilion (1,020); San Diego, CA |
| January 29, 2022; 4:00 p.m. | | at Loyola Marymount | W 69–65 | 13–9 (6–3) | 16 – Calcaterra | 8 – Earlington | 6 – McKinney III | Gersten Pavilion (906); Los Angeles, CA |
| February 3, 2022; 6:00 p.m., ESPN2 | | No. 2 Gonzaga; Rescheduled from Dec. 30 | L 62–92 | 13–10 (6–4) | 13 – Townsend | 12 – Brown | 2 – Parrish | Jenny Craig Pavilion (5,433); San Diego, CA |
| February 5, 2022; 4:00 p.m., BSSD | | Santa Clara | L 66–79 | 13–11 (6–5) | 23 – Earlington | 8 – Earlington | 3 – McKinney III | Jenny Craig Pavilion (1,221); San Diego, CA |
| February 10, 2022; 6:00 p.m., BSW | | at No. 22 Saint Mary's | L 57–86 | 13–12 (6–6) | 14 – Earlington | 8 – Earlington | 3 – Earlington | University Credit Union Pavilion (2,763); Moraga, CA |
| February 12, 2022; 6:00 p.m. | | Pacific | W 60–54 | 14–12 (7–6) | 14 – Earlington | 6 – Earlington | 3 – Townsend | Jenny Craig Pavilion (897); San Diego, CA |
| February 17, 2022; 7:00 p.m. | | at Portland | L 60–92 | 14–13 (7–7) | 16 – Townsend | 6 – Gultekin | 4 – Townsend | Chiles Center (1,188); Portland, OR |
| February 24, 2022; 7:00 p.m., Stadium | | No. 23 Saint Mary's | L 46–60 | 14–14 (7–8) | 13 – Townsend | 8 – Gultekin | 1 – tied | Jenny Craig Pavilion (1,043); San Diego, CA |
| February 26, 2022; 2:00 p.m., BSSD | | San Francisco | L 62–78 | 14–15 (7–9) | 15 – Earlington | 10 – Pinchuk | 2 – tied | Jenny Craig Pavilion (1,144); San Diego, CA |
WCC tournament
| March 3, 2022; 8:00 p.m., WCC Network | (7) | vs. (10) Pepperdine; First round | W 74–67 | 15–15 | 20 – Calcaterra | 13 – Earlington | 5 – Earlington | Orleans Arena (1,775); Paradise, NV |
| March 4, 2022; 8:00 p.m., WCC Network | (7) | vs. (6) Portland; Second round | L 55–73 | 15–16 | 17 – Townsend | 12 – Brown | 3 – tied | Orleans Arena; Paradise, NV |
*Non-conference game. ^{#}Rankings from AP poll. (#) Tournament seedings in parentheses. All times are in Pacific Time.
