= SoCal Challenge =

Defunct American college basketball tournament

- Sport: College Basketball
- Founded: 2021
- Folded: 2023
- No. of teams: 8 plus one additional team playing in the Showcase
- Country: United States
- Venue: The Pavilion at JSerra
- Last champions: Tarleton State (Sand Division, first title); Bradley (Surf Division, first title)
- Broadcasters: CBSSN, FloHoops
- Website: SoCal Challenge

The SoCal Challenge was an eight-team college basketball tournament held during Monday and Wednesday of Thanksgiving week of the NCAA Division I men's basketball season, with the inaugural tournament taking place in 2021. Following games held at campus sites, teams were placed into either the Sand Division or the Surf Division and compete for the tournament title in their division. Semifinal and final games were held at The Pavilion at JSerra in San Juan Capistrano, California. Each of the games played on campus in the days leading up to the main event involved one team from each division. The event was hosted by the Big West Conference. The final tournament was held in 2023.

== Brackets ==
=== 2023 ===
The 2023 tournament featured one Southern California team: Cal State Bakersfield from the host Big West Conference as well as California from the Pac-12 Conference. On-campus games were hosted by the team listed second below. Following the on-campus games, teams were placed into either the Sand Division or the Surf Division without regard to the outcome of those games. Division semifinal winners met in the finals. Following the tournament, the SoCal Showcase matched California and San Diego State.

==== On-campus games ====
Game recaps:

On-Campus Game; November 13 (P12N)
Cal State Bakersfield	63
California	83

On-Campus Game; November 14 (ESPN+)
Tarleton State	63
Bradley	86

On-Campus Game; November 17 (ESPN+)
Austin Peay	63
UTEP	71

On-Campus Game; November 17 (ESPN+)
Sacramento State	57
Tulane	92

==== Sand Division ====
Game recaps:

Semifinals; November 20 (FloHoops)
Cal State Bakersfield	75
Sacramento State	71
Austin Peay	59
Tarleton State	66

Championship; November 22 (FloHoops)
Cal State Bakersfield	40
Tarleton State	59
Third Place
Sacramento State	71
Austin Peay	74

KiAndre Gaddy of Tarleton State was named most valuable player for the Sand Division.

==== Surf Division ====
Game recaps:

Semifinals; November 20 (CBSSN)
California	72
UTEP	75
Bradley	80
Tulane	77

Championship; November 22 (CBSSN)
UTEP	59
Bradley	63
Third Place (CBSSN)
California	81
Tulane	84

Malevy Leons of Bradley was named most valuable player for the Surf Division.

==== Showcase ====
Game recap:

Showcase; November 25 (MWN)
California	67
San Diego State	76*

* – Denotes overtime period

=== 2022 ===
The 2022 tournament featured two Southern California teams: Cal State Northridge from the host Big West Conference and California Baptist, as well as Minnesota from the Big Ten Conference. On-campus games were hosted by the team listed second below. Following the on-campus games, teams were placed into either the Sand Division or the Surf Division without regard to the outcome of those games. Division semifinal winners met in the finals.

A four-game boys' high school basketball showcase event was held at the tournament site two days before the main tournament began.

==== On-campus games ====
Game recaps:

On-Campus Game; November 15 (ESPN+)
Cal State Northridge	55
California Baptist	62

On-Campus Game; November 17 (ESPN+)
Tennessee State	44
Southern Illinois	57

On-Campus Game; November 17 (BTN)
Central Michigan	60
Minnesota	68

On-Campus Game; November 18 (MWN)
High Point	68
UNLV	78

==== Sand Division ====
Game recaps:

Semifinals; November 21 (FloHoops)
Cal State Northridge	73
Tennessee State	74
High Point	68
Central Michigan	67

Championship; November 23 (FloHoops)
Tennessee State	72
High Point	77
Third Place (FloHoops)
Cal State Northridge	66
Central Michigan	82

Jaden House of High Point was named most valuable player for the Sand Division.

==== Surf Division ====
Game recaps:

Semifinals; November 21 (CBSSN)
California Baptist	61
Minnesota	62*
Southern Illinois	49
UNLV	56

Championship; November 23 (CBSSN)
Minnesota	62
UNLV	71
Third Place (CBSSN)
California Baptist	61
Southern Illinois	64*

* – Denotes overtime period

Keshon Gilbert of UNLV was named most valuable player for the Surf Division.

=== 2021 ===
The inaugural tournament featured Cal Poly from the host Big West Conference, three other schools located in California and TCU from the Big 12 Conference. On-campus games were hosted by the team listed second below. Following the on-campus games, teams were placed into either the Sand Division or the Surf Division without regard to the outcome of those games. Division semifinal winners met in the finals.

A women's beach volleyball event was held two weekends before the men's basketball tournament began.

==== On-campus games ====
Game recaps:

On-Campus Game; November 15
Utah Valley	86*
Pepperdine	74

On-Campus Game; November 15
Idaho	62
Fresno State	69

On-Campus Game; November 18 (ESPN+)
Nicholls	50
TCU	63

On-Campus Game; November 19
Cal Poly	57
Santa Clara	87

* – Denotes overtime period

==== Sand Division ====
Game recaps:

Semifinals; November 22 (FloHoops)
Cal Poly	72
Nicholls	75*
Utah Valley	83
Idaho	45

Championship; November 24 (FloHoops)
Nicholls	63
Utah Valley	74
Third Place (FloHoops)
Cal Poly	67
Idaho	63

* – Denotes overtime period

Fardaws Aimaq of Utah Valley was named most valuable player for the Sand Division.

==== Surf Division ====
Game recaps:

Semifinals; November 22 (CBSSN)
TCU	66
Santa Clara	85
Fresno State	70
Pepperdine	63

Championship; November 24 (CBSSN)
Santa Clara	52
Fresno State	59
Third Place (CBSSN)
TCU	73
Pepperdine	64

Orlando Robinson of Fresno State was named most valuable player for the Surf Division.
