= 2021–22 Pepperdine Waves men's basketball team =

West Coast Conference basketball team

2021–22 Pepperdine Waves men's basketball
- Conference: West Coast Conference
- Record: 7–25 (1–15 WCC)
- Head coach: Lorenzo Romar (4th, 7th overall season)
- Assistant coaches: Ken Bone; Curtis Allen; Gerald Brown
- Home arena: Firestone Fieldhouse

2021–22 West Coast Conference men's basketball standings
	Conf.				Overall
Team	W		L	PCT	W		L	PCT
No. 1 Gonzaga †	13	–	1	.929	28	–	4	.875
No. 18 Saint Mary's	12	–	3	.800	26	–	8	.765
Santa Clara	10	–	5	.667	21	–	12	.636
San Francisco	10	–	6	.625	24	–	10	.706
BYU	9	–	6	.600	24	–	11	.686
Portland	7	–	7	.500	19	–	15	.559
San Diego	7	–	9	.438	15	–	16	.484
Pacific	3	–	11	.214	8	–	22	.267
Loyola Marymount	3	–	12	.200	11	–	18	.379
Pepperdine	1	–	15	.063	7	–	25	.219
† 2022 WCC tournament winner Rankings from AP poll

The 2021–22 Pepperdine Waves men's basketball team represented Pepperdine University during the 2021–22 NCAA Division I men's basketball season. The Waves were led by head coach Lorenzo Romar, in the fourth season of his second stint after coaching the Waves from 1996 to 1999. They played their home games at the Firestone Fieldhouse in Malibu, California as members of the West Coast Conference.

== Previous season ==
In a season limited due to the ongoing COVID-19 pandemic, the Waves finished the 2020–21 season 15–12, 7–6 in WCC play to finish in fourth place. They defeated Santa Clara in the quarterfinals of the WCC tournament before losing in the semifinals to BYU. They received an invitation to College Basketball Invitational where they defeated Longwood, Bellarmine, and Coastal Carolina to win the tournament.

== Offseason ==
=== Departures ===
Name	Number	Pos.	Height	Weight	Year	Hometown	Reason for departure
Sedrick Altman	0	G	6'2"	180	Sophomore	Rialto, CA	Transferred to Rider
Michael Wexler	3	G	5'11"	175	RS Senior	Plymouth, MN	Walk-on; graduated
Colbey Ross	4	G	6'1"	185	Senior	Aurora, CO	Graduated
Andre Ball	10	F	6'7"	190	RS Sophomore	Chino Hills, CA	Transferred to Cal State Dominguez Hills
Kessler Edwards	15	F	6'8"	215	Junior	Rancho Cucamonga, CA	Declare for 2021 NBA draft
Kene Chukwuka	24	F	6'9"	225	Senior	Stockholm, Sweden	Graduated
Everett Perrot	25	F	6'6"	215	RS Sophomore	Elk Grove, CA	Walk-on; transferred
Robbie Heath	44	G	6'3"	180	Sophomore	Whittlesea, Australia	Turned pro

=== Incoming transfers ===
Name	Number	Pos.	Height	Weight	Year	Hometown	Previous school
Braun Hartfield	55	G	6'6"	185	RS Senior	Cleveland, OH	Transferred from San Diego. Under NCAA transfer rules, Hartfield was initially to sit out 2021–22 season, however due to the effects of the COVID-19 pandemic the NCAA ruled on December 16, 2020 that all transfers are immediately eligible. Will have one year of remaining eligibility.
Keith Fisher III	3	F	6'8"	225	Graduate Student	Los Angeles, CA	Graduate transfer from Illinois State.

=== Recruiting classes ===
==== 2021 recruiting class ====
College recruiting information
Name	Hometown	School	Height	Weight	Commit date
Maxwell Lewis #21 PF	Chandler, AZ	AZ Compass Prep	6 ft 7 in (2.01 m)	195 lb (88 kg)	Jun 28, 2021
Maxwell Lewis #21 PF	Recruit ratings: Scout: Rivals: 247Sports: ESPN: (81)				
Houston Mallette #36 SG	Newport Beach, CA	Pacifica Christian High School	6 ft 4 in (1.93 m)	180 lb (82 kg)	Sep 20, 2020
Houston Mallette #36 SG	Recruit ratings: Scout: Rivals: 247Sports: ESPN: (79)				
Mike Mitchell #41 PG	San Jose, CA	Archbishop Mitty High School	6 ft 2 in (1.88 m)	175 lb (79 kg)	Sep 11, 2019
Mike Mitchell #41 PG	Recruit ratings: Scout: Rivals: 247Sports: ESPN: (78)				
Sekou Gassama #45 C	Saint Louis	De Smet Jesuit High School	6 ft 9 in (2.06 m)	205 lb (93 kg)	Apr 12, 2021
Sekou Gassama #45 C	Recruit ratings: Scout: Rivals: 247Sports: ESPN: (76)				
Carson Basham; C	Phoenix, AZ	AZ Compass Prep	6 ft 10 in (2.08 m)	215 lb (98 kg)	Apr 22, 2020
Carson Basham; C	Recruit ratings: Scout: Rivals: 247Sports: ESPN: (NR)				
Jalen Pitre; PF	Long Beach, CA	Long Beach Polytechnic High School	6 ft 8 in (2.03 m)	N/A	Aug 16, 2020
Jalen Pitre; PF	Recruit ratings: Scout: Rivals: 247Sports: ESPN: (NR)				
Overall recruit ranking: Scout: nr Rivals: nr ESPN: nr
Note: In many cases, Scout, Rivals, 247Sports, On3, and ESPN may conflict in their listings of height and weight.; In these cases, the average was taken. ESPN grades are on a 100-point scale.; Sources: "Pepperdine Waves 2021 Basketball Commitments". Rivals.; "2021 Pepperdine Waves Basketball Commits". Scout.; "ESPN 2021 Pepperdine Waves Basketball recruits". ESPN.; "Scout.com Team Recruiting Rankings". Scout.; "2021 Team Ranking". Rivals.

==== 2022 recruiting class ====
College recruiting information (2022)
Name	Hometown	School	Height	Weight	Commit date
Jevon Porter #32 PF	Columbia, MO	Father Tolton Catholic High School	6 ft 6 in (1.98 m)	190 lb (86 kg)	Sep 20, 2020
Jevon Porter #32 PF	Recruit ratings: Scout: Rivals: 247Sports: ESPN: (82)				
Overall recruit ranking: Scout: nr Rivals: nr ESPN: nr
Note: In many cases, Scout, Rivals, 247Sports, On3, and ESPN may conflict in their listings of height and weight.; In these cases, the average was taken. ESPN grades are on a 100-point scale.; Sources: "Pepperdine Waves 2022 Basketball Commitments". Rivals.; "2022 Pepperdine Waves Basketball Commits". Scout.; "ESPN 2022 Pepperdine Waves Basketball recruits". ESPN.; "Scout.com Team Recruiting Rankings". Scout.; "2022 Team Ranking". Rivals.

== Roster ==
2021–22 Pepperdine Waves men's basketball team
Players
Coaches

Pos.	#	Name	Height	Weight	Year	Previous school	Hometown
G	0	Houston Mallette	6 ft 4 in (1.93 m)	155 lb (70 kg)	Fr	Pacifica Christian HS	Oakland, CA
G	1	Mike Mitchell, Jr.	6 ft 2 in (1.88 m)	175 lb (79 kg)	Fr	Archbishop Mitty HS	San Jose, CA
G	2	Darryl Polk Jr.	5 ft 9 in (1.75 m)	155 lb (70 kg)	Sr	Long Beach Poly HS	Long Beach, CA
F	3	Keith Fisher III	6 ft 8 in (2.03 m)	225 lb (102 kg)	GS	Westchester HS; Illinois State	Los Angeles, CA
G	5	Jade' Smith	6 ft 4 in (1.93 m)	165 lb (75 kg)	RS Sr	St. Joseph Notre Dame HS	Oakland, CA
F	10	Paul Jordan (W)	6 ft 5 in (1.96 m)	200 lb (91 kg)	Fr	Long Island Lutheran HS	Glen Cove, NY
C	11	Carson Basham	6 ft 10 in (2.08 m)	210 lb (95 kg)	Fr	AZ Compass Prep	Phoenix, AZ
F	12	Kendall Munson	6 ft 8 in (2.03 m)	220 lb (100 kg)	So	Garfield HS	Seattle, WA
G	13	Malachy Caffrey (W)	6 ft 1 in (1.85 m)	175 lb (79 kg)	So	La Salle HS	Yakima, WA
G	14	Jay Yoon (W)	6 ft 4 in (1.93 m)	195 lb (88 kg)	Sr	Arcadia HS	Arcadia, CA
G	22	Majok Deng	6 ft 5 in (1.96 m)	190 lb (86 kg)	RS So	Salpointe Catholic HS	Tucson, AZ
F	24	Maxwell Lewis	6 ft 7 in (2.01 m)	180 lb (82 kg)	Fr	AZ Compass Prep	Las Vegas, NV
F	31	Jan Zidek	6 ft 9 in (2.06 m)	240 lb (109 kg)	Jr	Gymnasium Ota Pavel	Prague, Czech Republic
C	34	Victor Ohia Obioha	6 ft 9 in (2.06 m)	220 lb (100 kg)	Sr	Hillcrest HS	Owerri, Nigeria
F	35	Aladji Gassama	6 ft 10 in (2.08 m)	205 lb (93 kg)	Fr	De Smet Jesuit HS	Senegal
G	55	Braun Hartfield	6 ft 6 in (1.98 m)	185 lb (84 kg)	RS Sr	Garfield Heights HS; San Diego	Cleveland, OH

Head coach

- Lorenzo Romar (Washington)

Assistant coach(es)

- Ken Bone (Seattle Pacific)
- Curtis Allen (Washington)
- Gerald Brown (Pepperdine)

Legend

- (C) Team captain
- (S) Suspended
- (I) Ineligible
- (W) Walk-on
- Injured
- Current redshirt

Roster

== Schedule and results ==
Date time, TV	Rank^{#}	Opponent^{#}	Result	Record	High points	High rebounds	High assists	Site (attendance) city, state
Exhibition
October 30, 2021*; 7:00 p.m.		at Point Loma Nazarene	L 50–77		14 – Fisher III	9 – Fisher III	2 – Tied	Golden Gymnasium (998); San Diego, CA
Non conference regular season
November 9, 2021*; 5:00 p.m., ESPN+		at Rice	L 63–82	0–1	18 – Mallette	6 – Tied	5 – Tied	Tudor Fieldhouse (1,796); Houston, TX
November 12, 2021*; 7:00 p.m., WCC Network		Idaho State	W 65–60	1–1	17 – Smith	10 – Fisher III	4 – Smith	Firestone Fieldhouse (1,210); Malibu, CA
November 15, 2021*; 7:00 p.m., WCC Network		Utah Valley; SoCal Challenge campus game	L 74–86 ^{OT}	1–2	21 – Mallette	10 – Smith	7 – Mitchell Jr.	Firestone Fieldhouse (435); Malibu, CA
November 17, 2021*; 7:00 p.m., WCC Network		UC Davis	W 72–67	2–2	17 – Mallette	7 – Tied	6 – Fisher III	Firestone Fieldhouse (490); Malibu, CA
November 20, 2021*; 6:00 p.m., ESPN+		at UC Irvine	L 48–82	2–3	13 – Fisher III	5 – Mallette	1 – Mallette	Bren Events Center (1,641); Irvine, CA
November 22, 2021*; 10:00 p.m., CBSSN		vs. Fresno State; SoCal Challenge Surf Division	L 63–70	2–4	20 – Zidek	4 – Tied	6 – Smith	The Pavilion at JSerra; San Juan Capistrano, CA
November 24, 2021*; 7:30 p.m., CBSSN		vs. TCU; SoCal Challenge Surf Division	L 64–73	2–5	17 – Zidek	6 – Tied	8 – Mitchell Jr.	The Pavilion at JSerra (1,700); San Juan Capistrano, CA
November 27, 2021*; 3:00 p.m., WCC Network		Grand Canyon	L 56–59	2–6	13 – Fisher III	8 – Ohia Obioha	5 – Mitchell Jr.	Firestone Fieldhouse (1,570); Malibu, CA
November 30, 2021*; 7:00 p.m., MW Network		at Nevada	L 66–79	2–7	12 – Mitchell Jr.	8 – Tied	4 – Mitchell Jr.	Lawlor Events Center (6,416); Reno, NV
December 3, 2021*; 7:00 p.m., ESPN+		at UC Santa Barbara	L 74–86	2–8	20 – Zidek	8 – Ohia Obioha	5 – Tied	The Thunderdome (2,211); Santa Barbara, CA
December 6, 2021*; 7:00 p.m., WCC Network		San Jose State	W 82–69	3–8	21 – Fisher III	12 – Ohia Obioha	8 – Mitchell Jr.	Firestone Fieldhouse (510); Malibu, CA
December 11, 2021*; 3:00 p.m., WCC Network		Alabama State	W 79–62	4–8	24 – Mallette	10 – Fisher III	7 – Mitchell Jr.	Firestone Fieldhouse (500); Malibu, CA
December 18, 2021*; 5:00 p.m., WCC Network		Southeast Missouri State	W 83–77	5–8	15 – Zidek	13 – Fisher III	6 – Mitchell Jr.	Firestone Fieldhouse (437); Malibu, CA
December 21, 2021*; 6:00 p.m., P12N		at Oregon	L 59–68	5–9	13 – Tied	8 – Ohia Obioha	3 – Tied	Matthew Knight Arena (5,350); Eugene, OR
December 23, 2021*; 1:00 p.m., WCC Network		Westmont	W 96–69	6–9	27 – Lewis	13 – Fisher III	7 – Mitchell Jr.	Firestone Fieldhouse (249); Malibu, CA
WCC regular season
January 8, 2022; 6:00 p.m., WCC Network		at No. 4 Gonzaga	L 83–117	6–10 (0–1)	21 – Mallette	5 – Tied	6 – Polk Jr.	McCarthey Athletic Center (6,000); Spokane, WA
January 10, 2022; 7:00 p.m., WCC Network		San Diego; Rescheduled from Jan. 6	L 62–72	6–11 (0–2)	15 – Smith	9 – Fisher III	6 – Mitchell Jr.	Firestone Fieldhouse (50); Malibu, CA
January 13, 2022; 8:00 p.m., Bally SoCal		Saint Mary's	L 62–77	6–12 (0–3)	17 – Zidek	7 – Zidek	4 – Smith	Firestone Fieldhouse (580); Malibu, CA
January 15, 2022; 5:00 p.m., WCC Network		Portland	L 63–82	6–13 (0–4)	17 – Zidek	9 – Mitchell Jr.	6 – Mitchell Jr.	Firestone Fieldhouse (465); Malibu, CA
January 20, 2022; 8:00 p.m., Bally West		at Loyola Marymount	L 80–85	6–14 (0–5)	28 – Zidek	8 – Mitchell Jr.	8 – Mitchell Jr.	Gersten Pavilion (616); Los Angeles, CA
January 22, 2022; 4:30 p.m., Bally SoCal		San Francisco	L 45–71	6–15 (0–6)	11 – Basham	8 – Basham	3 – Mitchell Jr.	Firestone Fieldhouse (515); Malibu, CA
January 27, 2022; 7:30 p.m., WCC Network		at San Diego	L 56–64	6–16 (0–7)	18 – Lewis	8 – Lewis	6 – Mitchell Jr.	Jenny Craig Pavilion (1,020); San Diego, CA
January 29, 2022; 5:00 p.m., CBSSN		at Saint Mary's	L 57–81	6–17 (0–8)	16 – Lewis	7 – Mitchell Jr.	2 – Mitchell Jr.	University Credit Union Pavilion (3,029); Moraga, CA
February 3, 2022; 7:00 p.m., WCC Network		at Pacific; Rescheduled from Jan. 1	L 76–81	6–18 (0–9)	26 – Lewis	10 – Lewis	3 – Lewis	Alex G. Spanos Center (866); Stockton, CA
February 5, 2022; 5:00 p.m., WCC Network		Pacific	W 70–64	7–18 (1–9)	22 – Lewis	7 – Zidek	2 – Mallette	Firestone Fieldhouse (515); Malibu, CA
February 10, 2022; 8:00 p.m., Bally West		at San Francisco	L 61–105	7–19 (1–10)	23 – Mallette	6 – Munson	3 – Mitchell Jr.	War Memorial Gymnasium (2,321); San Francisco, CA
February 12, 2022; 7:00 p.m., CBSSN		BYU	L 85–91	7–20 (1–11)	31 – Mallette	4 – Tied	7 – Mitchell Jr.	Firestone Fieldhouse (1,575); Malibu, CA
February 16, 2022; 8:00 p.m., ESPN2		No. 1 Gonzaga	L 66–86	7–21 (1–12)	25 – Mallette	7 – Ohia Obioha	4 – Mitchell Jr.	Firestone Fieldhouse (2,412); Malibu, CA
February 19, 2022; 5:00 p.m., WCC Network		at Portland	L 74–77	7–22 (1–13)	22 – Zidek	8 – Mitchell Jr.	6 – Mitchell Jr.	Chiles Center (2,409); Portland, OR
February 24, 2022; 7:00 p.m., WCC Network		Santa Clara	L 73–89	7–23 (1–14)	24 – Mallette	13 – Ohia Obioho	5 – Yoon	Firestone Fieldhouse (825); Malibu, CA
February 26, 2022; 5:00 p.m., ESPNU		at BYU	L 59–75	7–24 (1–15)	23 – Mallette	6 – Mitchell Jr.	8 – Mitchell Jr.	Marriott Center (15,721); Provo, UT
WCC tournament
March 3, 2022; 8:00 p.m., WCC Network	(10)	vs. (7) San Diego; First round	L 67–74	7–25	12 – Mitchell Jr.	10 – Mitchell Jr.	8 – Mitchell Jr.	Orleans Arena (1,775); Paradise, NV
*Non-conference game. ^{#}Rankings from AP Poll. (#) Tournament seedings in parentheses. All times are in Pacific Time.
