= 2021–22 Santa Clara Broncos men's basketball team =

American college basketball season

2021–22 Santa Clara Broncos men's basketball

NIT, First Round
- Conference: West Coast Conference
- Record: 21–12 (10–5 WCC)
- Head coach: Herb Sendek (6th season)
- Assistant coaches: Jason Ludwig; Scott Garson; Ryan Madry
- Home arena: Leavey Center

2021–22 West Coast Conference men's basketball standings
	Conf.				Overall
Team	W		L	PCT	W		L	PCT
No. 1 Gonzaga †	13	–	1	.929	28	–	4	.875
No. 18 Saint Mary's	12	–	3	.800	26	–	8	.765
Santa Clara	10	–	5	.667	21	–	12	.636
San Francisco	10	–	6	.625	24	–	10	.706
BYU	9	–	6	.600	24	–	11	.686
Portland	7	–	7	.500	19	–	15	.559
San Diego	7	–	9	.438	15	–	16	.484
Pacific	3	–	11	.214	8	–	22	.267
Loyola Marymount	3	–	12	.200	11	–	18	.379
Pepperdine	1	–	15	.063	7	–	25	.219
† 2022 WCC tournament winner Rankings from AP poll

The 2021–22 Santa Clara Broncos men's basketball team represented Santa Clara University during the 2021–22 NCAA Division I men's basketball season. The Broncos were led by sixth-year head coach Herb Sendek and played their home games at the Leavey Center as members of the West Coast Conference. They finished the season 21–12, 10–5 in WCC play to finish in third place. They defeated Portland in the third round of the WCC tournament before losing in the semifinals to Saint Mary's. They received an invitation to the National Invitation Tournament, where they lost in the first round to Washington State.

== Previous season ==
In a season limited due to the ongoing COVID-19 pandemic, the Broncos finished the 2020–21 season 12–8, 4–5 in WCC play to finish in sixth place. They defeated Portland and Pacific in the WCC tournament before losing in the quarterfinals to Pepperdine.

== Departures ==
Name	Number	Pos.	Height	Weight	Year	Hometown	Reason for departure
D. J. Mitchell	0	F	6'8"	215	RS Senior	Fresno, CA	Graduated
Christian Carlyle	1	G	6'5"	210	Senior	Jacksonville, FL	Graduated
Trent Hudgens Jr.	2	G	6'2"	175	Freshman	Phoenix, AZ	Transferred to Northern Colorado
Joe Foley	3	G	6'3"	200	Sophomore	Atherton, CA	Walk-on; didn't return
Juan Ducasse	15	F	6'9"	210	RS Sophomore	Montevideo, Uruguay	Signed to play professionally in Argentina with Hispano Americano
Justin Traina	21	G	6'3"	170	RS Sophomore	Patterson, CA	Walk-on; didn't return
Ezekiel Richards	23	C	6'10"	240	RS Sophomore	Oak Park, CA	Transferred to Northern Arizona
Vittorio Reynoso-Avila	25	F	6'5"	200	Senior	La Mirada, CA	Graduated
Guglielmo Caruso	30	F	6'11"	210	Junior	Naples, Italy	Signed to play professionally in Italy with Pallacanestro Varese
Austin Sacks	33	F	6'6"	195	Freshman	Encino, CA	Walk-on; transferred to Balyor
Connor Strambi	35	G	6'4"	175	Freshman	San Mateo, CA	Walk-on; transferred to Skyline College

=== Incoming transfers ===
Name	Number	Pos.	Height	Weight	Year	Hometown	Previous School
P. J. Pipes	2	G	6'2"	190	RS Senior	Woodridge, IL	Green Bay
Parker Braun	23	F	6'8"	217	RS Junior	Overland Park, KS	Missouri
Danilo Djuricic	30	F	6'8"	215	Senior	Brampton, ON	Harvard

== Recruiting ==
College recruiting
Name	Hometown	School	Height	Weight	Commit date
Camaron Tongue #48 PF	Weston, MA	The Rivers School	6 ft 7 in (2.01 m)	220 lb (100 kg)	Sep 3, 2019
Camaron Tongue #48 PF	Recruit ratings: Scout: Rivals: 247Sports: (76)				
Carlos Stewart #51 SG	Baton Rouge, LA	The Dunham School	6 ft 1 in (1.85 m)	185 lb (84 kg)	May 21, 2019
Carlos Stewart #51 SG	Recruit ratings: Scout: Rivals: 247Sports: (76)				
Brenton Knapper; PG	Ontario, ON	Colony High School	6 ft 0 in (1.83 m)	160 lb (73 kg)	Nov 23, 2019
Brenton Knapper; PG	Recruit ratings: Scout: Rivals: 247Sports: (0)				
Max Besselink; PF	Finland	International School of Helsinki	6 ft 7 in (2.01 m)	190 lb (86 kg)	Jun 1, 2020
Max Besselink; PF	Recruit ratings: Scout: Rivals: 247Sports: (0)				
Jacob Holt; PF	Delta, BC	Vancouver College	6 ft 8 in (2.03 m)	193 lb (88 kg)	Jun 24, 2020
Jacob Holt; PF	Recruit ratings: Scout: Rivals: 247Sports: (0)				
Overall recruit ranking: Scout: nr Rivals: nr ESPN: nr
Note: In many cases, Scout, Rivals, 247Sports, On3, and ESPN may conflict in their listings of height and weight.; In these cases, the average was taken. ESPN grades are on a 100-point scale.; Sources: "Santa Clara 2021 Basketball Commitments". Rivals.; "2021 Santa Clara Basketball Commits". Scout.; "ESPN". ESPN.; "Scout.com Team Recruiting Rankings". Scout.; "2021 Team Ranking". Rivals.

=== Recruiting class of 2022 ===
College recruiting (2022)
Name	Hometown	School	Height	Weight	Commit date
Jake Ensminger; PG	Ulm, Germany	Orange Academy	6 ft 8 in (2.03 m)	200 lb (91 kg)	Jul 11, 2021
Jake Ensminger; PG	Recruit ratings: Scout: Rivals: 247Sports: (0)				
Overall recruit ranking: Scout: nr Rivals: nr ESPN: nr
Note: In many cases, Scout, Rivals, 247Sports, On3, and ESPN may conflict in their listings of height and weight.; In these cases, the average was taken. ESPN grades are on a 100-point scale.; Sources: "Santa Clara 2022 Basketball Commitments". Rivals.; "2022 Santa Clara Basketball Commits". Scout.; "ESPN". ESPN.; "Scout.com Team Recruiting Rankings". Scout.; "2022 Team Ranking". Rivals.

== Roster ==
2021–22 Santa Clara Broncos men's basketball team
Players
Coaches

Pos.	#	Name	Height	Weight	Year	Previous school	Hometown
G	0	Brenton Knapper	6 ft 0 in (1.83 m)	160 lb (73 kg)	Fr	Colony HS	Ontario, CA
G	1	Carlos Stewart	6 ft 1 in (1.85 m)	185 lb (84 kg)	Fr	The Dunham School	Baton Rouge, LA
G	2	PJ Pipes	6 ft 2 in (1.88 m)	190 lb (86 kg)	Sr	Lemont HS; Green Bay	Woodridge, IL
G	4	Giordan Williams	6 ft 3 in (1.91 m)	165 lb (75 kg)	Jr	Long Beach Poly HS	Long Beach, CA
G	10	Miguel Tomley	6 ft 3 in (1.91 m)	185 lb (84 kg)	RS So	Tamanawis HS	Surrey, BC
C	12	Jaden Bediako	6 ft 10 in (2.08 m)	240 lb (109 kg)	Jr	Ridley College	Brampton, ON
F	13	Josip Vrankic	6 ft 9 in (2.06 m)	215 lb (98 kg)	RS Sr	Wasatch Academy	Toronto, ON
F	14	Keshawn Justice	6 ft 7 in (2.01 m)	220 lb (100 kg)	Sr	Madison East HS	Madison, WI
F	15	Jacob Holt	6 ft 9 in (2.06 m)	215 lb (98 kg)	Fr	Vancouver College	Ladner, BC
G	20	Eli Barry (W)	6 ft 1 in (1.85 m)	165 lb (75 kg)	Jr	The Westminster Schools	Atlanta, GA
F	21	Camaron Tongue	6 ft 7 in (2.01 m)	220 lb (100 kg)	Fr	Rivers School	Medfield, MA
G	22	Max Dorward (W)	6 ft 5 in (1.96 m)	170 lb (77 kg)	Sr	Palo Alto HS	Palo Alto, CA
F	23	Parker Braun	6 ft 10 in (2.08 m)	217 lb (98 kg)	RS Jr	Blue Valley Northwest HS; Missouri	Overland Park, KS
G	24	Jalen Williams	6 ft 6 in (1.98 m)	190 lb (86 kg)	Jr	Perry HS	Gilbert, AZ
F	30	Danilo Djuricic	6 ft 8 in (2.03 m)	215 lb (98 kg)	Sr	St. Michael's College; Harvard	Brampton, ON
F	33	Max Besselink	6 ft 7 in (2.01 m)	215 lb (98 kg)	Fr	International School of Helsinki	Helsinki, Finland

Head coach

- Herb Sendek (Carnegie Mellon)

Assistant coach(es)

- Jason Ludwig (UCLA)
- Scott Garson (UC Santa Barbara)
- Ryan Madry (West Georgia)

Legend

- (C) Team captain
- (S) Suspended
- (I) Ineligible
- (W) Walk-on
- Injured
- Current redshirt

Roster

== Schedule and results ==
Date time, TV	Rank^{#}	Opponent^{#}	Result	Record	High points	High rebounds	High assists	Site (attendance) city, state
Non-conference regular season
November 9, 2021*; 6:00 p.m., WCC Network		Cal State Fullerton	W 84–77	1–0	29 – Vrankic	8 – Vrankic	5 – Tie	Leavey Center (1,031); Santa Clara, CA
November 12, 2021*; 8:00 p.m., CBSSN		Stanford	W 88–72	2–0	24 – Pipes	13 – Justice	8 – Vrankic	Leavey Center (2,181); Santa Clara, CA
November 16, 2021*; 6:00 p.m., WCC Network		Nevada	W 96–74	3–0	19 – Braun	8 – Tie	5 – Tie	Leavey Center (1,002); Santa Clara, CA
November 19, 2021*; 6:00 p.m., WCC Network		Cal Poly; SoCal Challenge campus game	W 87–57	4–0	26 – J. Williams	7 – J. Williams	5 – Pipes	Leavey Center (1,088); Santa Clara, CA
November 22, 2021*; 7:30 p.m., CBSSN		vs. TCU; SoCal Challenge Surf Division semifinals	W 85–66	5–0	22 – J. Williams	10 – Justice	5 – Tied	The Pavilion at JSerra; San Juan Capistrano, CA
November 24, 2021*; 10:00 p.m., CBSSN		vs. Fresno State; SoCal Challenge Surf Division championship	L 52–59	5–1	12 – Justice	10 – Braun	3 – Tied	The Pavilion at JSerra (1,700); San Juan Capistrano, CA
November 27, 2021*; 4:30 p.m., WCC Network		UC Irvine	L 64–69	5–2	20 – Justice	7 – Justice	5 – Pipes	Leavey Center (834); Santa Clara, CA
November 30, 2021*; 6:00 p.m., WCC Network		Hawaiʻi	W 70–58	6–2	30 – J. Williams	10 – Justice	4 – J. Williams	Leavey Center (1,093); Santa Clara, CA
December 4, 2021*; 2:00 p.m., WCC Network		Louisiana Tech	L 75–78	6–3	28 – J. Williams	12 – Braun	5 – Braun	Leavey Center (821); Santa Clara, CA
December 7, 2021*; 6:00 p.m., WCC Network		Mount St. Mary's	W 88–77	7–3	22 – J. Williams	10 – Justice	6 – J. Williams	Leavey Center (962); Santa Clara, CA
December 11, 2021*; 6:00 p.m., P12N		at California	L 60–72	7–4	13 – Justice	9 – Justice	4 – Pipes	Haas Pavilion (4,606); Berkeley, CA
December 14, 2021*; 6:00 p.m., CBSSN		at Boise State	L 60–72	7–5	12 – Tied	6 – Braun	5 – Pipes	ExtraMile Arena (6,187); Boise, ID
December 17, 2021*; 6:00 p.m., WCC Network		Florida A&M	W 80–66	8–5	25 – J. Williams	6 – Braun	5 – Tied	Leavey Center (675); Santa Clara, CA
December 19, 2021*; 2:00 p.m., WCC Network		Montana	W 79–64	9–5	23 – Justice	11 – Justice	5 – Stewart	Leavey Center (835); Santa Clara, CA
December 21, 2021*; 7:00 p.m., MW Network		at San Jose State	W 79–57	10–5	20 – J. Williams	13 – Justice	6 – Vrankic	Provident Credit Union Event Center (1,761); San Jose, CA
WCC regular season
January 12, 2022; WCC Network		at Pacific; Rescheduled from Dec. 30	W 84–70	11–5 (1–0)	22 – J. Williams	9 – Vrankic	5 – J. Williams	Alex G. Spanos Center (948); Stockton, CA
January 15, 2022; 1:00 p.m., NBCSBA		No. 2 Gonzaga	L 83–115	11–6 (1–1)	17 – J. Williams	7 – Holt	4 – J. Williams	Leavey Center (1,100); Santa Clara, CA
January 20, 2022; 6:00 p.m., CBSSN		at Saint Mary's	L 65–73	11–7 (1–2)	18 – Williams	9 – Braun	4 – Williams	University Credit Union Pavilion (3,056); Moraga, CA
January 24, 2022; 6:00 p.m., WCC Network		San Diego; Rescheduled from Jan. 1	W 78–74 ^{OT}	12–7 (2–2)	22 – Vrankic	8 – Justice	4 – Vrankic	Leavey Center (1,100); Santa Clara, CA
January 27, 2022; 8:00 p.m., ESPNU		BYU	W 77–76	13–7 (3–2)	26 – Williams	10 – Braun	4 – Vrankic	Leavey Center (1,100); Santa Clara, CA
January 29, 2022; 4:00 p.m., Stadium		at San Francisco	L 85–88	13–8 (3–3)	23 – Williams	7 – Bediako	5 – Justice	War Memorial Gymnasium (3,010); San Francisco, CA
January 31, 2022; 6:00 p.m., WCC Network		Pacific	W 81–59	14–8 (4–3)	20 – Vrankic	10 – Justice	5 – Williams	Leavey Center (680); Santa Clara, CA
February 3, 2022; 6:00 p.m., Stadium		Loyola Marymount	W 79–60	15–8 (5–3)	13 – Justice	10 – Justice	4 – Vrankic	Leavey Center (716); Santa Clara, CA
February 5, 2022; 4:00 p.m., NBCSBA		at San Diego	W 79–66	16–8 (6–3)	19 – Williams	11 – Justice	4 – Justice	Jenny Craig Pavilion (1,221); San Diego, CA
February 8, 2022; 8:00 p.m., ESPNU		No. 22 Saint Mary's; Rescheduled from Jan. 6	W 77–72	17–8 (7–3)	21 – Pipes	8 – Vrankic	10 – Williams	Leavey Center (1,714); Santa Clara, CA
February 12, 2022; 3:00 p.m., Stadium		San Francisco	L 58–74	17–9 (7–4)	16 – J. Williams	6 – Vrankic	3 – J. Williams	Leavey Center (2,011); Santa Clara, CA
February 14, 2022; 6:00 p.m., WCC Network		at Portland; Rescheduled from Jan. 8	Canceled					Chiles Center; Portland, OR
February 17, 2022; 8:00 p.m., NBCSCA		at Loyola Marymount	W 84–80	18–9 (8–4)	19 – Pipes	8 – Bediako	5 – Williams	Gersten Pavilion (591); Los Angeles, CA
February 19, 2022; 6:00 p.m., NBCSBA		at No. 1 Gonzaga	L 69–81	18–10 (8–5)	27 – Pipes	10 – Bediako	6 – Williams	McCarthey Athletic Center (6,000); Spokane, WA
February 24, 2022; 7:00 p.m., WCC Network		at Pepperdine	W 89–73	19–10 (9–5)	25 – Williams	8 – Tied	6 – Williams	Firestone Fieldhouse (825); Malibu, CA
February 26, 2022; 2:00 p.m., WCC Network		Portland	W 102–89	20–10 (10–5)	30 – Vrankic	7 – Bediako	9 – Williams	Leavey Center (2,113); Santa Clara, CA
WCC tournament
March 5, 2022; 9:30 p.m., ESPN2	(3)	vs. (6) Portland; Third Round	W 91–67	21–10	24 – J. Williams	7 – Tied	6 – J. Williams	Orleans Arena; Paradise, NV
March 7, 2022; 8:30 pm, ESPN2	(3)	vs. (2) No. 17 Saint Mary's; Semifinals	L 72–75	21–11	21 – Vrankic	12 – Bediako	6 – Williams	Orleans Arena; Paradise, NV
NIT
March 15, 2022*; 8:00 p.m., ESPNU		at (4) Washington State; First Round – SMU Bracket	L 50–63	21–12	19 – Williams	15 – Williams	4 – Williams	Beasley Coliseum (1,389); Pullman, WA
*Non-conference game. ^{#}Rankings from AP Poll. (#) Tournament seedings in parentheses. All times are in Pacific Time.
