= 2022 West Coast Conference men's basketball tournament =

Basketball tournament

- Classification: Division I
- Season: 2021–22
- Teams: 10
- Site: Orleans Arena; Paradise, Nevada
- Champions: Gonzaga (20th title)
- Winning coach: Mark Few (18th title)
- MVP: Andrew Nembhard (Gonzaga)

2021–22 West Coast Conference men's basketball standings
	Conf.				Overall
Team	W		L	PCT	W		L	PCT
No. 1 Gonzaga †	13	–	1	.929	28	–	4	.875
No. 18 Saint Mary's	12	–	3	.800	26	–	8	.765
Santa Clara	10	–	5	.667	21	–	12	.636
San Francisco	10	–	6	.625	24	–	10	.706
BYU	9	–	6	.600	24	–	11	.686
Portland	7	–	7	.500	19	–	15	.559
San Diego	7	–	9	.438	15	–	16	.484
Pacific	3	–	11	.214	8	–	22	.267
Loyola Marymount	3	–	12	.200	11	–	18	.379
Pepperdine	1	–	15	.063	7	–	25	.219
† 2022 WCC tournament winner Rankings from AP poll

The 2022 West Coast Conference men's basketball tournament was the postseason men's basketball tournament for the West Coast Conference (WCC) during the 2021–22 NCAA Division I men's basketball season. The tournament was held during March 3–8, 2022, at the Orleans Arena in Paradise, Nevada. Los Angeles–based University Credit Union was the title sponsor of the tournament for the fourth consecutive year. TritonPoint Wealth and Sterling Global Financial's SCRED fund are the presenting sponsors of the tournament. The winner of the tournament, the Gonzaga Bulldogs, received the conference's automatic bid to the 2022 NCAA Division I men's basketball tournament.

== Venue ==
For the 14th consecutive year, the 2022 WCC Tournament was held in the Orleans Arena. When Orleans Arena is set up for basketball games, the seating capacity is 7,471. The Orleans Arena is located at the 1,886-room Orleans Hotel and Casino, about 1 mile west of the Las Vegas Strip. Tickets for the WCC Tournament typically sell out quickly. In 2021, due to the COVID-19 pandemic, no fans were permitted to attend this tournament.

== Seeds ==
All 10 WCC schools participated in the tournament. Teams are typically seeded by conference record, with a tiebreaker system used to seed teams with identical conference records. However, due to numerous regular-season game cancellations, the WCC announced that the seeding for the 2021 edition would be determined using an adjusted conference winning percentage. With several conference games being canceled during the 2022 regular season, the conference was expected to use the adjusted conference winning percentage for seeding the 2022 tournament. Developed in partnership with Ken Pomeroy, the adjusted conference winning percentage (Pomeroy AWP) takes into account the strength of the opponent and the location where each game was played. The tournament followed a format similar to that used from 2003 to 2011. The 7 through 10 seeds played in the "first round", the 5 and 6 seeds started play in the "second round", and the 3 and 4 seeds started in the "quarterfinals". The top two seeds received byes into the semifinals. As expected, the WCC released the tournament seedings based on the Pomeroy AWP a few days prior to the start of the tournament.

Seed	School	Conference Record	Pomeroy AWP	NET ranking (March 2, 2021)
1	Gonzaga	13–1	.921%	1st
2	Saint Mary's	12–3	.816%	19th
3	Santa Clara	10–5	.673%	72nd
4	San Francisco	10–6	.655%	27th
5	BYU	9–6	.595%	53rd
6	Portland	7–7	.429%	183rd
7	San Diego	7–9	.411%	211th
8	Loyola Marymount	3–12	.222%	212th
9	Pacific	3–11	.183%	289th
10	Pepperdine	1–15	.095%	282nd

== Schedule ==
Session	Game	Time*	Matchup^{#}	Score	Television	Attendance
First round – Thursday, March 3, 2022
1	1	6:00 pm	No. 8 Loyola Marymount vs. No. 9 Pacific	86–66	BYUtv, RSN^{α}	
1	2	8:00 pm	No. 7 San Diego vs. No. 10 Pepperdine	74–67	BYUtv, RSN^{α}	
Second round – Friday, March 4, 2022
2	3	6:00 pm	No. 5 BYU vs. No. 8 Loyola Marymount	85–60	BYUtv, RSN^{α}	
2	4	8:00 pm	No. 6 Portland vs. No. 7 San Diego	73–55	BYUtv, RSN^{α}	
Third round – Saturday, March 5, 2022
3	5	7:30 pm	No. 4 San Francisco vs. No. 5 BYU	75–63	ESPN2	
3	6	9:30 pm	No. 3 Santa Clara vs. No. 6 Portland	91–67	ESPN2	
Semifinals – Monday, March 7, 2022
4	7	6:00 pm	No. 1 Gonzaga vs. No. 4 San Francisco	81–71	ESPN	
4	8	8:30 pm	No. 2 Saint Mary's vs. No. 3 Santa Clara	75–72	ESPN2	
Championship – Tuesday, March 8, 2022
5	9	6:00 pm	No. 1 Gonzaga vs. No. 2 Saint Mary's	82–69	ESPN	
*Game times in PT. #-Rankings denote tournament seeding.

=== Notes ===
^α RSNs airing the games include Bally Sports, AT&T SportsNet Rocky Mountain, and NBC Sports California. (RSNs may not carry every game)

== Bracket ==
First round Thursday, March 3
8	Loyola Marymount	86
9	Pacific	66
7	San Diego	74
10	Pepperdine	67

Second round Friday, March 4
5	BYU	85
8	Loyola Marymount	60
6	Portland	73
7	San Diego	55

Third round Saturday, March 5
4	San Francisco	75
5	BYU	63
3	Santa Clara	91
6	Portland	67

Semifinals; Monday, March 7
1	#1 Gonzaga	81
4	San Francisco	71
2	#17 Saint Mary's	75
3	Santa Clara	72

Championship; Tuesday, March 8
1	#1 Gonzaga	82
2	#17 Saint Mary's	69

* denotes overtime period

== See also ==
- 2022 West Coast Conference women's basketball tournament
- West Coast Conference men's basketball tournament
- West Coast Conference
