= 2021–22 Loyola Marymount Lions men's basketball team =

American college basketball season

2021–22 Loyola Marymount Lions men's basketball
- Conference: West Coast Conference
- Record: 11–18 (3–12 WCC)
- Head coach: Stan Johnson (2nd season)
- Assistant coaches: David Carter; Allen Edwards; Greg Youncofski
- Home arena: Gersten Pavilion

2021–22 West Coast Conference men's basketball standings
	Conf.				Overall
Team	W		L	PCT	W		L	PCT
No. 1 Gonzaga †	13	–	1	.929	28	–	4	.875
No. 18 Saint Mary's	12	–	3	.800	26	–	8	.765
Santa Clara	10	–	5	.667	21	–	12	.636
San Francisco	10	–	6	.625	24	–	10	.706
BYU	9	–	6	.600	24	–	11	.686
Portland	7	–	7	.500	19	–	15	.559
San Diego	7	–	9	.438	15	–	16	.484
Pacific	3	–	11	.214	8	–	22	.267
Loyola Marymount	3	–	12	.200	11	–	18	.379
Pepperdine	1	–	15	.063	7	–	25	.219
† 2022 WCC tournament winner Rankings from AP poll

The 2021–22 Loyola Marymount Lions men's basketball team represented Loyola Marymount University during the 2021–22 NCAA Division I men's basketball season. The Lions were led by second-year head coach Stan Johnson and played their home games at Gersten Pavilion in Los Angeles, California as members of the West Coast Conference.

== Previous season ==
In a season limited due to the ongoing COVID-19 pandemic, the Lions finished the season 13–9 overall and 7–5 in WCC play to finish in third place. They defeated San Francisco in the second round of the WCC tournament before losing in the quarterfinals to Saint Mary's.

== Offseason ==
=== Departures ===
Name	Number	Pos.	Height	Weight	Year	Hometown	Reason for departure
Lazar Nekić	3	F	7'0"	231	Sophomore	Belgrade, Serbia	Transferred
Kodye Pugh	5	F	6'8"	214	RS senior	Baltimore, MD	Graduated
Parker Dortch	11	F	6'7"	211	RS senior	Columbus, NJ	Graduate transferred
Mattias Markusson	14	C	7'3"	265	RS senior	Stockholm, Sweden	Graduated
Luke Frasso	22	G	6'5"	182	Freshman	Palos Verdes, CA	Walk-on; no longer on team roster
L. Simpson	40	G	6'2"	188	Freshman	Chatsworth, CA	Walk-on; transferred

=== Incoming transfers ===
Name	Number	Pos.	Height	Weight	Year	Hometown	Previous school
Gary Harris Jr.	3	G	6'6"	193	Sophomore	Los Angeles, CA	Transferred from Utah in November during the 2020–21 season. Under NCAA transfer rules, Harris Jr. had to sit out until November and was eligible to start in December during the 2021–22 season. He had three and a half years of remaining eligibility.
Kwane Marble II	11	G	6'6"	195	Junior	Denver, CO	Transferred from Wyoming. Under NCAA transfer rules, he had to sit out for the 2021–22 season. Had two years of remaining eligibility.
Cameron Shelton	20	G	6'2"	175	Senior	Chino, CA	Transferred from Northern Arizona. Under NCAA transfer rules, Shelton had to sit out for the 2021–22 season. Had one year of remaining eligibility.
Alex Merkviladze	23	F	6'9"	225	Sophomore	Kutaisi, Georgia	Cal State Northridge

=== 2021 recruiting class ===
College recruiting
Name	Hometown	School	Height	Weight	Commit date
Lamaj Lewis; SG	Bellflower, CA	St. John Bosco High School	6 ft 4 in (1.93 m)	175 lb (79 kg)	May 13, 2020
Lamaj Lewis; SG	Recruit ratings: Scout: Rivals: 247Sports: (0)				
James Nobles; SG	Van Nuys, CA	Birmingham High School	6 ft 3 in (1.91 m)	160 lb (73 kg)	May 13, 2020
James Nobles; SG	Recruit ratings: Scout: Rivals: 247Sports: (0)				
David Elliott; SG	Van Nuys, CA	Birmingham High School	6 ft 2 in (1.88 m)	175 lb (79 kg)	May 14, 2020
David Elliott; SG	Recruit ratings: Scout: Rivals: 247Sports: (0)				
Overall recruit ranking: Scout: nr Rivals: nr ESPN: nr
Note: In many cases, Scout, Rivals, 247Sports, On3, and ESPN may conflict in their listings of height and weight.; In these cases, the average was taken. ESPN grades are on a 100-point scale.; Sources: "Loyola Marymount Lions 2021 Basketball Commitments". Rivals.; "2021 Loyola Marymount Lions Basketball Commits". Scout.; "ESPN 2021 Loyola Marymount Lions Basketball recruits". ESPN.; "Scout.com Team Recruiting Rankings". Scout.; "2021 Team Ranking". Rivals.

== Roster ==
2021–22 Loyola Marymount Lions men's basketball team
Players
Coaches

Pos.	#	Name	Height	Weight	Year	Previous school	Hometown
G/F	0	Eli Scott	6 ft 6 in (1.98 m)	232 lb (105 kg)	RS Sr	Chino Hills HS	Chino Hills, CA
G/F	1	Dameane Douglas	6 ft 7 in (2.01 m)	205 lb (93 kg)	RS Jr	San Joaquin Memorial HS	Hanford, CA
G	2	Joe Quintana	6 ft 2 in (1.88 m)	165 lb (75 kg)	RS Sr	Bonita HS	West Covina, CA
G	3	Gary Harris, Jr.	6 ft 6 in (1.98 m)	193 lb (88 kg)	RS So	Middlebrooks Academy; Siena	Los Angeles, CA
G	4	David Elliott IV	6 ft 3 in (1.91 m)	185 lb (84 kg)	Fr	Birmingham Community Charter HS	Grananda Hills, CA
F	10	Quentin Jackson, Jr.	6 ft 3 in (1.91 m)	185 lb (84 kg)	RS Sr	Cape Fear Christian Academy; Temple	Cary, NC
G	11	Kwane Marble II (redshirt)	6 ft 5 in (1.96 m)	206 lb (93 kg)	Jr	Denver East HS; Wyoming	Denver, CO
G	12	Jalin Anderson	6 ft 3 in (1.91 m)	175 lb (79 kg)	So	Dream City Christian HS	Jackson, TN
G	13	Lamaj Lewis	6 ft 6 in (1.98 m)	205 lb (93 kg)	Fr	St. John Charter HS	Paramount, CA
G	14	James Nobles	6 ft 4 in (1.93 m)	160 lb (73 kg)	Fr	Birmingham Community Charter HS	North Hollywood, CA
G	20	Cameron Shelton (redshirt)	6 ft 2 in (1.88 m)	185 lb (84 kg)	Sr	Damien HS; Northern Arizona	Chino, CA
G	23	Mayoum Mayoum	6 ft 4 in (1.93 m)	180 lb (82 kg)	So	The Potter's House Christian Academy	Melbourne, Australia
F	24	Alex Merkviladze	6 ft 9 in (2.06 m)	230 lb (104 kg)	So	Modesto Christian School; Cal State Northridge	Kutaisi, Georgia
F	34	Keli Leaupepe	6 ft 6 in (1.98 m)	245 lb (111 kg)	Jr	Box Hill Senior	Melbourne, Australia
F	35	Ivan Alipiev	6 ft 8 in (2.03 m)	215 lb (98 kg)	Sr	Lycée Alphonse de Lamartine	Sofia, Bulgaria
G	42	Anthony Yu (W)	6 ft 2 in (1.88 m)	170 lb (77 kg)	So	SPIRE Academy	Foster City, CA

Head coach

- Stan Johnson (Bemidji State)

Assistant coach(es)

- David Carter (Saint Mary's)
- Allen Edwards (Kentucky)
- Greg Youncofski (Kansas)

Legend

- (C) Team captain
- (S) Suspended
- (I) Ineligible
- (W) Walk-on
- Injured
- Current redshirt

Roster

== Schedule and results ==
Date time, TV	Rank^{#}	Opponent^{#}	Result	Record	Site (attendance) city, state
Exhibition
November 5, 2021*; 7:00 p.m.		UC San Diego; Exhibition Charity	W 57-44		Gersten Pavilion; Los Angeles, CA
Non-conference regular season
November 9, 2021*; 7:00 p.m.		Chattanooga	L 64–75	0–1	Gersten Pavilion (1,503); Los Angeles, CA
November 13, 2021*; 4:00 p.m., WCC Network		Arizona Christian	W 74–67	1–1	Gersten Pavilion (850); Los Angeles, CA
November 17, 2021*; 7:00 p.m., WCC Network		Little Rock; Jacksonville Classic on-campus game	W 82–63	2–1	Gersten Pavilion; Los Angeles, CA
November 21, 2021*; 2:30 p.m., CBSSN		vs. Florida State; Jacksonville Classic Duval semifinals	L 45–73	2–2	UNF Arena; Jacksonville, FL
November 22, 2021*; 3:00 p.m., CBSSN		vs. SMU; Jacksonville Classic Duval	W 76–70	3–2	UNF Arena; Jacksonville, FL
November 27, 2021*; 7:00 p.m., WCC Network		Prairie View A&M	W 83–80	4–2	Gersten Pavilion (677); Los Angeles, CA
November 29, 2021*; 7:00 p.m., WCC Network		Grand Canyon	L 72–78	4–3	Gersten Pavilion (1,135); Los Angeles, CA
December 4, 2021*; 4:00 p.m., ESPN+		at Long Beach State	W 77–74	5–3	Walter Pyramid (1,429); Long Beach, CA
December 7, 2021*; 6:00 p.m., ESPNU		at Tulsa	W 60–55	6–3	Reynolds Center (2,518); Tulsa, OK
December 11, 2021*; 4:00 p.m.		New Mexico State	L 58–63	6–4	Gersten Pavilion (996); Los Angeles, CA
December 18, 2021*; 8:00 p.m., CBSSN		at Nevada	L 63–68	6–5	Lawlor Events Center (6,689); Reno, NV
December 21, 2021*; 4:00 p.m., ESPN+		at Bellarmine	W 71–57	7–5	Freedom Hall (1,519); Louisville, KY
WCC regular season
January 1, 2022; 4:00 p.m., WCC Network		No. 4 Gonzaga	Canceled		Gersten Pavilion; Los Angeles, CA
January 13, 2022; 8:00 p.m., CBSSN		at San Francisco	L 73–97	7–6 (0–1)	War Memorial Gymnasium (1,160); San Francisco, CA
January 15, 2022; 7:00 p.m., CBSSN		at San Diego	L 65–70	7–7 (0–2)	Jenny Craig Pavilion (604); San Diego, CA
January 17, 2022; 4:00 p.m., WCC Network		Portland; Rescheduled from Jan. 6	W 70–58	8–7 (1–2)	Gersten Pavilion (635); Los Angeles, CA
January 20, 2022; 8:00 p.m., Bally Sports West		Pepperdine	W 85–80 ^{OT}	9–7 (2–2)	Gersten Pavilion (616); Los Angeles, CA
January 22, 2022; 7:00 p.m., ESPNU		Saint Mary's	L 51–83	9–8 (2–3)	Gersten Pavilion (1,027); Los Angeles, CA
January 27, 2022; 8:00 p.m., CBSSN		at No. 2 Gonzaga	L 55–89	9–9 (2–4)	McCarthey Athletic Center (6,000); Spokane, WA
January 29, 2022; 4:00 p.m., WCC Network		San Diego	L 65–69	9–10 (2–5)	Gersten Pavilion (906); Los Angeles, CA
February 3, 2022; 5:00 p.m., Stadium		at Santa Clara	L 60–79	9–11 (2–6)	Leavey Center (716); Santa Clara, CA
February 5, 2022; 7:00 p.m., CBSSN		at Saint Mary's	L 60–71	9–12 (2–7)	University Credit Union Pavilion (3,044); Moraga, CA
February 10, 2022; 8:00 p.m., ESPNU		BYU	L 82–83 ^{OT}	9–13 (2–8)	Gersten Pavilion (1,090); Los Angeles, CA
February 12, 2022; 7:00 p.m., Bally Sports West		at Portland	L 76–86	9–14 (2–9)	Chiles Center (1,569); Portland, OR
February 17, 2022; 8:00 p.m., Bally Sports West		Santa Clara	L 80–84	9–15 (2–10)	Gersten Pavilion (591); Los Angeles, CA
February 19, 2022; 7:00 p.m., WCC Network		at Pacific; Rescheduled from Jan. 8	L 68–69	9–16 (2–11)	Alex G. Spanos Center (1,014); Stockton, CA
February 24, 2022; 7:00 p.m., CBSSN		at BYU	L 59–79	9–17 (2–12)	Marriott Center (12,569); Provo, UT
February 26, 2022; 4:30 p.m., Bally SoCal		Pacific	W 90–77	10–17 (3–12)	Gersten Pavilion (844); Los Angeles, CA
WCC tournament
March 3, 2022; 6:00 p.m., WCC Network	(8)	vs. (9) Pacific; First round	W 86–66	11–17	Orleans Arena (1,775); Paradise, NV
March 4, 2022; 8:00 p.m., WCC Network	(8)	vs. (5) BYU; Second round	L 60–85	11–18	Orleans Arena; Paradise, NV
*Non-conference game. ^{#}Rankings from AP Poll. (#) Tournament seedings in parentheses.
