= Nolan Hickman =

American basketball player (born 2003)

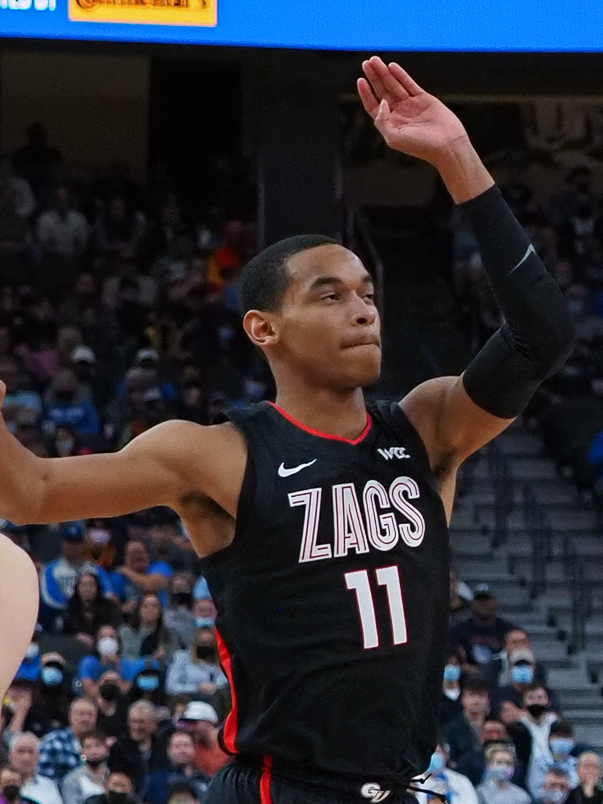
- Hickman with Gonzaga in 2021

No. 2 – Capital City Go-Go
- Position: Point guard / shooting guard
- League: NBA G League

Personal information
- Born: May 7, 2003 (age 23) Seattle, Washington, U.S.
- Listed height: 6 ft 2 in (1.88 m)
- Listed weight: 190 lb (86 kg)

Career information
- High school: Eastside Catholic (Sammamish, Washington); Wasatch Academy (Mount Pleasant, Utah)
- College: Gonzaga (2021–2025)
- NBA draft: 2025: undrafted
- Playing career: 2025–present

Career history
- 2025–present: Capital City Go-Go

Career highlights
- First-team All-WCC (2025); Second-team All-WCC (2024); WCC All-Freshman Team (2022); McDonald's All-American (2021)
- Stats at NBA.com
- Stats at Basketball Reference

Nolan Hickman Jr. (born May 7, 2003) is an American professional basketball player for the Capital City Go-Go of the NBA G League. He played college basketball for the Gonzaga Bulldogs.

== High school career ==
Hickman played basketball for Eastside Catholic School in Sammamish, Washington. As a sophomore, he helped his team reach the Class 3A state semifinals. In his junior season, he averaged about 17 points and three assists per game. Hickman competed for Seattle Rotary on the Amateur Athletic Union circuit. For his final season, he transferred to Wasatch Academy in Mount Pleasant, Utah. As a senior, he averaged 16 points, 5.4 assists and 3.9 rebounds per game. He was named to the McDonald's All-American Game and Jordan Brand Classic rosters and won the Utah Gatorade Player of the Year award.

=== Recruiting ===
Hickman was considered a five-star recruit by ESPN and Rivals, and a four-star recruit by 247Sports. He was one of the highest-ranked point guards in the 2021 class. Hickman originally committed to playing college basketball for Kentucky but later decommitted and was granted a full release from his National Letter of Intent. On May 15, 2021, he committed to Gonzaga over offers from Kansas and Auburn.

College recruiting
Name	Hometown	School	Height	Weight	Commit date
Nolan Hickman; PG	Seattle, WA	Wasatch Academy (UT)	6 ft 2 in (1.88 m)	175 lb (79 kg)	May 15, 2021
Nolan Hickman; PG	Recruit ratings: Rivals: 247Sports: ESPN: (90)				
Overall recruit ranking: Rivals: 23 247Sports: 45 ESPN: 24
Note: In many cases, Scout, Rivals, 247Sports, On3, and ESPN may conflict in their listings of height and weight.; In these cases, the average was taken. ESPN grades are on a 100-point scale.; Sources: "Gonzaga 2021 Basketball Commitments". Rivals.; "2021 Gonzaga Bulldogs Recruiting Class". ESPN.; "2021 Team Ranking". Rivals.

== College career ==
Hickman averaged 5.1 points and 1.5 assists per game. He was named to the West Coast Conference All-Freshman Team. As a sophomore, Hickman averaged 7.7 points and 3.1 rebounds per game. He was named to the Second Team All-West Coast Conference as a junior.

== Career statistics ==
Legend
GP	Games played	GS	Games started	MPG	Minutes per game
FG%	Field goal percentage	3P%	3-point field goal percentage	FT%	Free throw percentage
RPG	Rebounds per game	APG	Assists per game	SPG	Steals per game
BPG	Blocks per game	PPG	Points per game	**Bold**	Career high

=== College ===
Year	Team	GP	GS	MPG	FG%	3P%	FT%	RPG	APG	SPG	BPG	PPG
2021–22	Gonzaga	32	0	17.2	.444	.308	.667	1.5	1.3	.6	.2	5.1
2022–23	Gonzaga	**37**	**36**	28.0	.420	.354	.813	**2.4**	**3.1**	**1.0**	**.3**	7.7
2023–24	Gonzaga	35	35	**35.3**	.471	.413	.883	2.3	2.7	**1.0**	**.3**	**14.0**
2024–25	Gonzaga	35	34	29.7	**.478**	**.445**	**.931**	**2.4**	2.3	**1.0**	**.3**	10.9
Career		139	105	27.8	.457	.395	.853	2.2	2.4	.9	.3	9.5
