= 2021–22 UNLV Runnin' Rebels basketball team =

American college basketball season

2021–22 UNLV Runnin' Rebels basketball
- Conference: Mountain West Conference
- Record: 18–14 (10–8 MW)
- Head coach: Kevin Kruger (1st season)
- Assistant coaches: Carlin Hartman; Tim Buckley; Brandon Chappell
- Home arena: Thomas & Mack Center

2021–22 Mountain West Conference men's basketball standings
	Conf.				Overall
Team	W		L	PCT	W		L	PCT
No. 23 Boise State †	15	–	3	.833	27	–	8	.771
No. 24 Colorado State	14	–	4	.778	25	–	6	.806
San Diego State	13	–	4	.765	23	–	9	.719
Wyoming	13	–	5	.722	25	–	9	.735
UNLV	10	–	8	.556	18	–	14	.563
Fresno State	8	–	9	.471	23	–	13	.639
Utah State	8	–	10	.444	18	–	16	.529
Nevada	6	–	12	.333	13	–	18	.419
New Mexico	5	–	12	.294	13	–	19	.406
Air Force	4	–	13	.235	11	–	18	.379
San Jose State	1	–	17	.056	8	–	23	.258
† Conference tournament winner Rankings from AP poll

The 2021–22 UNLV Runnin' Rebels basketball team represented the University of Nevada, Las Vegas during the 2021–22 NCAA Division I men's basketball season. The Runnin' Rebels were led by first-year head coach Kevin Kruger and played their home games at the Thomas & Mack Center in Paradise, Nevada as members of the Mountain West Conference. They finished the season 18–14, 10–8 in MWC play to finish in fifth place. They lost to Wyoming in the quarterfinals of the MWC tournament. They failed to receive an invite to a postseason tournament.

== Previous season ==
In a season limited due to the ongoing COVID-19 pandemic, the Runnin' Rebels finished the 2020–21 season 12–15, 12–6 in Mountain West play to finish in seventh place. They defeated Air Force in the first round of the Mountain West tournament before losing in the quarterfinals to Utah State.

On March 18, 2021, head coach T. J. Otzelberger left UNLV after two seasons for the Iowa State head coaching job. On March 21, the school announced that assistant coach Kevin Kruger would be promoted to the head coaching position.

== Offseason ==
=== Departures ===
Name	Number	Pos.	Height	Weight	Year	Hometown	Reason for departure
Donovan Yap	0	G	6'3"	175	Freshman	Las Vegas, NV	Transferred to Fresno State
Moses Wood	1	F	6'8"	210	RS Sophomore	Reno, NV	Transferred to Portland
Caleb Grill	3	G	6'3"	195	Sophomore	Wichita, KS	Transferred to Iowa State
David Jenkins Jr.	5	G	6'2"	195	RS Junior	Tacoma, WA	Graduate transferred from Utah
Edoardo Del Cadia	10	F	6'7"	235	Junior	Senigallia, Italy	Transferred to Nicholls
Jhaylon Martinez	12	C	6'11"	260	Freshman	Vallejo, CA	Transferred to UC Riverside
Issac Lindsey	14	G	6'4"	190	Freshman	Mineral Point, WI	Walk-on; transferred to Wisconsin
Nick Blake	22	G	6'6"	220	Freshman	Las Vegas, NV	Transferred to Pacific
Kendrick Gilbert	24	F	6'5"	190	Freshman	Las Vegas, NV	Walk-on; no long on team roster
Devin Tillis	30	F	6'6"	215	Freshman	Los Angeles, CA	Transferred to UC Irvine
Cheikh Mbacke Diong	34	F	6'11"	220	Senior	Dakar, Senegal	Graduate transferred to UCF

=== Incoming transfers ===
Name	Number	Pos.	Height	Weight	Year	Hometown	Previous School
Victor Iwuakor	0	F	6'7"	223	Junior	Abuja, Nigeria	Transferred from Oklahoma. Under NCAA transfer rules, Iwuakor will have to sit out for the 2021–22 season. Will have two years of remaining eligibility.
Mike Nuga	1	G	6'2"	180	GS Senior	Toronto, ON	Transferred from Kent State. Will be eligible to play immediately since Nuga graduated from Kent State.
Justin Webster	2	G	6'3"	180	Junior	Dallas, TX	Transferred from Hawaii. Under NCAA transfer rules, Webster will have to sit out for the 2021–22 season. Will have two years of remaining eligibility.
Donovan Williams	3	G	6’6”	190	Junior	Houston, TX	Transferred from Texas. Under NCAA transfer rules, Williams will have to sit out for the 2021–22 season. Will have two years of remaining eligibility.
Jordan McCabe	5	G	6'0"	188	Senior	Kaukauna, WI	Transferred from West Virginia. Will be eligible to play immediately since McCabe graduated from West Virginia.
David Muoka	12	C	6'10"	211	Junior	Hong Kong	Transferred from Lamar. Under NCAA transfer rules, Muoka will have to sit out for the 2021–22 season. Will have two years of remaining eligibility.
Royce Hamm Jr.	13	F	6'9"	225	GS Senior	Houston, TX	Transferred from Texas. Will be eligible to play immediately since Hamm Jr. graduated from Texas.
Josh Baker	22	G	6'2"	169	Junior	Tempe, AZ	Junior college transferred from Hutchinson CC.
James Hampshire	30	C	7'1"	242	GS Senior	Flagstaff, AZ	Transferred from Pacific. Will be eligible to play immediately since Hampshire graduated from Pacific.

=== 2021 recruiting class ===
College recruiting information
Name	Hometown	School	Height	Weight	Commit date
Keshon Gilbert; PG	Las Vegas, NV	Durango High School	6 ft 1 in (1.85 m)	170 lb (77 kg)	Sep 7, 2019
Keshon Gilbert; PG	Recruit ratings: Scout: Rivals: 247Sports: ESPN: (NR)				
Overall recruit ranking:
Note: In many cases, Scout, Rivals, 247Sports, On3, and ESPN may conflict in their listings of height and weight.; In these cases, the average was taken. ESPN grades are on a 100-point scale.; Sources: "2021 UNLV Basketball Commitments". Rivals.; "2021 Team Ranking". Rivals.

== Roster ==
2021–22 UNLV Runnin' Rebels men's basketball team
Players
Coaches

Pos.	#	Name	Height	Weight	Year	Previous school	Hometown
F	0	Victor Iwuakor (redshirt)	6 ft 7 in (2.01 m)	225 lb (102 kg)	Jr	Oklahoma	Abuja, Nigeria
G	1	Michael Nuga	6 ft 2 in (1.88 m)	180 lb (82 kg)	GS	Kent State	Toronto ON
G	2	Justin Webster (redshirt)	6 ft 3 in (1.91 m)	180 lb (82 kg)	Jr	Hawaii	Dallas, TX
G	3	Donovan Williams (redshirt)	6 ft 6 in (1.98 m)	190 lb (86 kg)	Jr	Texas	Houston, TX
G	5	Jordan McCabe	6 ft 0 in (1.83 m)	190 lb (86 kg)	Sr	West Virginia	Kaukauna, WI
G	10	Keshon Gilbert	6 ft 4 in (1.93 m)	180 lb (82 kg)	Fr	Vashon HS	Las Vegas, NV
C	12	David Muoka (redshirt)	6 ft 10 in (2.08 m)	210 lb (95 kg)	Jr	Lamar	Hong Kong
G	13	Bryce Hamilton	6 ft 4 in (1.93 m)	205 lb (93 kg)	Sr	Pasadena HS	Pasadena, CA
F	14	Royce Hamm Jr.	6 ft 9 in (2.06 m)	225 lb (102 kg)	GS	Texas	Houston, TX
F	15	Reece Brown	6 ft 9 in (2.06 m)	200 lb (91 kg)	RS So	Loomis Chaffee School	Albany, NY
G	22	Josh Baker	6 ft 4 in (1.93 m)	175 lb (79 kg)	Jr	Hutchinson CC	Tempe, AZ
G	24	Trey Hurlburt (W)	5 ft 11 in (1.8 m)	175 lb (79 kg)	Sr	Cal State San Marcos	Las Vegas, NV
C	30	James Hampshire	7 ft 1 in (2.16 m)	240 lb (109 kg)	GS	Pacific	Flagstaff, AZ
G	31	Marvin Coleman (W)	6 ft 3 in (1.91 m)	200 lb (91 kg)	Sr	Foothill HS	Las Vegas, NV

Head coach

- Kevin Kruger (UNLV)

Assistant coach(es)

- Tim Buckley (Bemidji State)
- Carlin Hartman (Tulane)
- Brandon Chappell (Lamar)

Legend

- (C) Team captain
- (S) Suspended
- (I) Ineligible
- (W) Walk-on
- Injured
- Current redshirt

Roster

== Schedule and results ==
Date time, TV	Rank^{#}	Opponent^{#}	Result	Record	High points	High rebounds	High assists	Site (attendance) city, state
Non-conference regular season
November 10, 2021*; 7:00 p.m.		Gardner–Webb	W 64–58	1–0	22 – Hamilton	17 – Hamm Jr.	3 – Baker	Thomas & Mack Center (4,962); Paradise, NV
November 13, 2021*; 5:00 p.m., Stadium		California	W 55–52	2–0	12 – Hamilton	7 – Hamm Jr.	3 – Tied	Thomas & Mack Center (4,937); Paradise, NV
November 15, 2021*; 7:00 p.m., YurView		North Dakota State; Roman Main Event Campus-Site Game	W 64–62	3–0	17 – Hamilton	17 – Hamm Jr.	4 – Coleman	Thomas & Mack Center (4,381); Paradise, NV
November 19, 2021*; 9:30 p.m., ESPN2		vs. No. 4 Michigan; Roman Main Event Semifinals	L 61–74	3–1	21 – Hamilton	10 – Hamm Jr.	5 – McCabe	T-Mobile Arena; Paradise, NV
November 21, 2021*; 9:30 p.m., ESPN2		vs. Wichita State; Roman Main Event Consolation – 3rd Place	L 73–74	3–2	18 – Hamilton	11 – Hamm Jr.	8 – McCabe	T-Mobile Arena (8,624); Paradise, NV
November 24, 2021*; 6:30 p.m.		Whittier	W 101–45	4–2	17 – Webster	9 – Coleman	5 – Webster	Thomas & Mack Center (4,288); Paradise, NV
November 27, 2021*; 2:00 p.m., Stadium		No. 2 UCLA	L 51–73	4–3	18 – Hamilton	4 – Tied	5 – McCabe	Thomas & Mack Center (6,392); Paradise, NV
December 1, 2021*; 5:00 p.m., ESPN+		at SMU	L 64–83	4–4	13 – Hamm Jr.	10 – Hamm Jr.	5 – McCabe	Moody Coliseum (3,399); Dallas, TX
December 4, 2021*; 7:00 p.m.		at San Francisco	L 62–83	4–5	23 – Hamilton	5 – Hamilton	4 – Gilbert	War Memorial Gymnasium (1,327); San Francisco, CA
December 8, 2021*; 7:00 p.m.		vs. Seattle; UNLV at the Mandalay Bay	W 76–56	5–5	21 – Nuga	14 – Hamm Jr.	8 – Nuga	Michelob Ultra Arena (637); Paradise, NV
December 11, 2021*; 7:00 p.m.		vs. Hartford; UNLV at the Mandalay Bay	W 95–78	6–5	33 – Hamilton	7 – Hamm Jr.	11 – McCabe	Michelob Ultra Arena (3,257); Paradise, NV
December 15, 2021*; 7:00 p.m., YurView		Omaha	W 84–71	7–5	26 – Hamilton	12 – Hamm Jr.	5 – Tied	Thomas & Mack Center (4,345); Paradise, NV
December 22, 2021*; 7:00 p.m., YurView		San Diego	W 80–57	8–5	20 – Tied	10 – Hamm Jr.	7 – McCabe	Thomas & Mack Center (4,377); Paradise, NV
Mountain West regular season
January 1, 2022; 1:00 p.m., CBS		San Diego State	L 55–62	8–6 (0–1)	16 – Williams	14 – Hamm Jr.	5 – McCabe	Thomas & Mack Center (5,082); Paradise, NV
January 11, 2022; 8:00 p.m., CBSSN		New Mexico	W 85–56	9–6 (1–1)	29 – Williams	13 – Hamm Jr.	5 – McCabe	Thomas & Mack Center (3,860); Paradise, NV
January 14, 2022; 8:00 p.m., FS1		Fresno State	L 68–73	9–7 (1–2)	24 – Hamilton	8 – Hamm Jr.	3 – McCabe	Thomas & Mack Center (4,976); Paradise, NV
January 17, 2022; 6:00 p.m., CBSSN		at San José State; Rescheduled from January 5	W 81–56	10–7 (2–2)	20 – Williams	9 – Muoka	5 – McCabe	Provident Credit Union Event Center (1,182); San Jose, CA
January 20, 2022; 6:00 p.m., Mountain West Network		at Air Force; Rescheduled from January 8	L 62–69	10–8 (2–3)	32 – Hamilton	9 – Hamm Jr.	2 – Tied	Clune Arena (934); Colorado Springs, CO
January 22, 2022; 12:00 p.m., Stadium		San José State	W 70–62	11–8 (3–3)	30 – Hamilton	14 – Hamm Jr.	4 – Gilbert	Thomas & Mack Center (4,466); Paradise, NV
January 24, 2022; 6:00 p.m., CBSSN		at San Diego State; Originally scheduled for Jan. 18	L 55–80	11–9 (3–4)	23 – Hamilton	8 – Muoka	5 – McCabe	Viejas Arena (10,528); San Diego, CA
January 28, 2022; 6:00 p.m., FS1		at Colorado State	W 88–74	12–9 (4–4)	45 – Hamilton	7 – Hamilton	5 – Tied	Moby Arena (8,083); Fort Collins, CO
February 1, 2022; 7:00 p.m., FS1		Nevada; Battle for Nevada	W 69–58	13–9 (5–4)	17 – Tied	8 – Hamm Jr.	5 – Nuga	Thomas & Mack Center (6,670); Paradise, NV
February 5, 2022; 4:00 p.m., CBSSN		at Utah State	L 75–90	13–10 (5–5)	33 – Hamilton	5 – Tied	8 – McCabe	Smith Spectrum (9,029); Logan, UT
February 8, 2022; 8:00 p.m., MW Network		Air Force	W 78–44	14–10 (6–5)	24 – Hamilton	16 – Hamm, Jr.	10 – McCabe	Thomas & Mack Center (5,312); Paradise, NV
February 11, 2022; 8:00 p.m., FS1		at Boise State	L 63–69	14–11 (6–6)	32 – Hamilton	7 – Hamm, Jr.	6 – McCabe	ExtraMile Arena (7,660); Boise, ID
February 16, 2022; 7:30 p.m., CBSSN		at Fresno State	W 60–57	15–11 (7–6)	17 – Hamilton	8 – Muoka	4 – Hamilton	Save Mart Center (4,723); Fresno, CA
February 19, 2022; 5:00 p.m., CBSSN		Colorado State	W 72–51	16–11 (8–6)	20 – Hamilton	12 – Hamm Jr.	4 – Hamilton	Thomas & Mack Center (6,153); Paradise, NV
February 22, 2022; 8:00 p.m., CBSSN		at Nevada; Battle for Nevada	W 62–54	17–11 (9–6)	27 – Hamilton	12 – Hamm Jr.	7 – McCabe	Lawlor Events Center (9,148); Reno, NV
February 26, 2022; 7:00 p.m., CBSSN		Boise State	L 76–86	17–12 (9–7)	25 – Hamilton	7 – Muoka	5 – McCabe	Thomas & Mack Center (7,176); Paradise, NV
March 2, 2022; 7:30 p.m., FS1		Wyoming	W 64–57	18–12 (10–7)	17 – Hamm Jr.	10 – Hamm Jr.	4 – Hamilton	Thomas & Mack Center (6,204); Paradise, NV
March 5, 2022; 8:00 p.m., FS1		at New Mexico	L 67–76	18–13 (10–8)	28 – Hamilton	10 – Hamm, Jr.	7 – McCabe	The Pit (9,404); Albuquerque, NM
Mountain West tournament
March 10, 2022; 2:30 p.m., CBSSN	(5)	(4) Wyoming; Quarterfinals	L 56–59	18–14	22 – Hamilton	7 – Tied	3 – Hamilton	Thomas & Mack Center; Paradise, NV
*Non-conference game. ^{#}Rankings from AP Poll. (#) Tournament seedings in parentheses. All times are in Pacific Time.
