= 2021–22 Air Force Falcons men's basketball team =

American college basketball season

2021–22 Air Force Falcons men's basketball

Sunshine Slam (Bracket B) champions
- Conference: Mountain West Conference
- Record: 11–18 (4–13 MW)
- Head coach: Joe Scott (6th overall, 2nd straight season)
- Assistant coaches: David Metzendorf; Jared Czech; Maj Marc Holum; Cam Griffin
- Home arena: Clune Arena

2021–22 Mountain West Conference men's basketball standings
	Conf.				Overall
Team	W		L	PCT	W		L	PCT
No. 23 Boise State †	15	–	3	.833	27	–	8	.771
No. 24 Colorado State	14	–	4	.778	25	–	6	.806
San Diego State	13	–	4	.765	23	–	9	.719
Wyoming	13	–	5	.722	25	–	9	.735
UNLV	10	–	8	.556	18	–	14	.563
Fresno State	8	–	9	.471	23	–	13	.639
Utah State	8	–	10	.444	18	–	16	.529
Nevada	6	–	12	.333	13	–	18	.419
New Mexico	5	–	12	.294	13	–	19	.406
Air Force	4	–	13	.235	11	–	18	.379
San Jose State	1	–	17	.056	8	–	23	.258
† Conference tournament winner Rankings from AP poll

The 2021–22 Air Force Falcons men's basketball team represented the United States Air Force Academy during the 2021–22 NCAA Division I men's basketball season. The Falcons, led by head coach Joe Scott in the second season of his second stint as head coach (and sixth overall after coaching at Air Force from 2000 to 2004), played their home games at Clune Arena on the Air Force Academy's main campus in Colorado Springs, Colorado as members of the Mountain West Conference.

The Falcons finished the season 11–18, 4–13 in Mountain West play, and finished in 10th place. They were defeated by Utah State in the first round of the Mountain West tournament, ending their season.

== Previous season ==
In a season limited due to the ongoing COVID-19 pandemic, the Falcons finished the 2020–21 season 5–20, 5–17 in Mountain West play, to finish in 10th place. They lost in the first round of the Mountain West tournament to UNLV.

== Offseason ==
=== Departures ===
Name	Number	Pos.	Height	Weight	Year	Hometown	Reason for departure
Solomon Pierre-Louis	1	G	6' 3"	175	Sophomore	Columbus, OH	No longer on team roster
Glen McClintock	2	G	6' 2"	185	Freshman	Kansas City, MO	Transferred to Northeastern
Logan Morrissey	3	G	6' 4"	195	Freshman	Tampa, FL	No longer on team roster
Chris Joyce	5	G	6' 5"	193	Senior	Jacksonville, FL	Graduated
Ameka Akaya	11	G	6' 6"	215	Senior	Hagerstown, MD	Graduated
Nick René	21	G	6' 0"	175	Junior	Garland, TX	No longer on team roster
Mason Taylor	24	G	6' 4"	185	Sophomore	Kansas City, MO	Transferred
Keaton Van Soelen	44	G	6' 7"	190	Senior	Waukee, IA	Graduated

=== 2021 recruiting class ===
College recruiting information
Name	Hometown	School	Height	Weight	Commit date
Vincent Brady; SF	Indianapolis, IN	Cathedral High School	6 ft 4 in (1.93 m)	185 lb (84 kg)	Oct 27, 2020
Vincent Brady; SF	Recruit ratings: Scout: Rivals: (0)				
Jake Heidbreder; SG	Floyds Knobs, IN	Floyd Central High School	6 ft 4 in (1.93 m)	165 lb (75 kg)	Oct 28, 2020
Jake Heidbreder; SG	Recruit ratings: Scout: Rivals: (0)				
Rytis Petraitis; SF	Conroe, TX	Oak Ridge High School	6 ft 5 in (1.96 m)	180 lb (82 kg)	Oct 28, 2020
Rytis Petraitis; SF	Recruit ratings: Scout: Rivals: (0)				
Overall recruit ranking: Scout: – Rivals: –
Note: In many cases, Scout, Rivals, 247Sports, On3, and ESPN may conflict in their listings of height and weight.; In these cases, the average was taken. ESPN grades are on a 100-point scale.; Sources: "2021 Team Ranking". Rivals.

== Roster ==
2021–22 Air Force Falcons men's basketball team
Players
Coaches

Pos.	#	Name	Height	Weight	Year	Previous school	Hometown
G	0	Joseph Octave	6 ft 4 in (1.93 m)	200 lb (91 kg)	So	Mary Star of the Sea HS	Gardena, CA
G	4	Carter Murphy	6 ft 4 in (1.93 m)	190 lb (86 kg)	Jr	Arcadia HS	Phoenix, AZ
G	10	A. J. Walker	6 ft 2 in (1.88 m)	191 lb (87 kg)	Sr	St. Mary's Hall	San Antonio, TX
G	12	Christian Depollar	6 ft 5 in (1.96 m)	202 lb (92 kg)	So	St. Stephen's & St. Agnes School	Montgomery County, MD
F	15	Abe Kinrade	6 ft 7 in (2.01 m)	200 lb (91 kg)	Sr	Maquoketa HS	Maquoketa, IA
F	22	Nikc Jackson	6 ft 8 in (2.03 m)	195 lb (88 kg)	Jr	Rancho Solano HS	Scottsdale, AZ
G	30	Camden Vander Zwaag	6 ft 4 in (1.93 m)	200 lb (91 kg)	Jr	Johnston HS	Johnston, IA
F	31	CJ Haut	6 ft 8 in (2.03 m)	200 lb (91 kg)	Jr	St. Mary's Prep	Monroe, WI
G	32	Simon Banks	6 ft 1 in (1.85 m)	185 lb (84 kg)	Jr	Brebeuf Jesuit Prep	Indianapolis, IN
G/F	33	Derek Dickenscheidt	6 ft 6 in (1.98 m)	190 lb (86 kg)	So	Cinco Ranch HS	Katy, TX
G	34	Kyle Brown	6 ft 2 in (1.88 m)	185 lb (84 kg)	So	La Cañada HS	La Cañada, CA

Head coach

- Joe Scott (Princeton)

Assistant coach(es)

- Sydney Johnson (Princeton)
- David Metzendorf (Ithaca)
- Jared Czech (Manhattanville)
- Maj Marc Holum (Air Force)
- Cam Griffin (Denver

Legend

- (C) Team captain
- (S) Suspended
- (I) Ineligible
- (W) Walk-on
- Injured
- Current redshirt

Roster
Last update: March 9, 2025

== Schedule and results ==
Date time, TV	Rank^{#}	Opponent^{#}	Result	Record	Site (attendance) city, state
Non-conference regular season
November 11, 2021*; 12:00 p.m., ESPN+		vs. South Dakota	L 53–59	0–1	Sanford Pentagon (1,854); Sioux Falls, SD
November 13, 2021*; 12:00 p.m., ESPN+		at Tulsa; Sunshine Slam campus-site game	W 59–58	1–1	Reynolds Center (2,538); Tulsa, OK
November 17, 2021*; 7:00 p.m.		Texas Southern	W 61–57	2–1	Clune Arena (1,331); Colorado Springs, CO
November 20, 2021*; 12:30 p.m., FloHoops		vs. Holy Cross; Sunshine Slam semifinals	W 72–53	3–1	Ocean Center; Daytona Beach, FL
November 21, 2021*; 12:30 p.m., FloHoops		vs. Bethune–Cookman; Sunshine Slam championship	W 73–65	4–1	Ocean Center; Daytona Beach, FL
November 24, 2021*; 2:00 p.m.		Denver	W 66–65	5–1	Clune Arena (1,076); Colorado Springs, CO
November 27, 2021*; 2:00 p.m.		Idaho State	W 59–48	6–1	Clune Arena (1,245); Colorado Springs, CO
December 4, 2021*; 2:00 p.m., Stadium		Army; Rivalry	W 76–58	7–1	Clune Arena (1,853); Colorado Springs, CO
December 8, 2021*; 7:00 p.m., ESPN+		at Montana	L 48–66	7–2	Dahlberg Arena (2,841); Missoula, MT
December 19, 2021*; 2:00 p.m., ESPN+		at Arkansas State	L 46–68	7–3	First National Bank Arena; Jonesboro, AR
December 21, 2021*; 6:00 p.m., ESPN+		at Tarleton State	L 45–67	7–4	Wisdom Gymnasium (1,423); Stephenville, TX
Mountain West regular season
December 29, 2021; 1:00 p.m.		Utah State	W 49–47	8–4 (1–0)	Clune Arena (1,123); Colorado Springs, CO
January 1, 2022; 2:00 p.m.		at Fresno State	Canceled due to health and safety concerns		Save Mart Center; Fresno, CA
January 4, 2022; 7:00 p.m., Stadium		at No. 20 Colorado State	L 59–67	8–5 (1–1)	Moby Arena (4,977); Fort Collins, CO
January 15, 2022; 3:00 p.m., CBSSN		Nevada	L 68–75	8–6 (1–2)	Clune Arena (1,013); Colorado Springs, CO
January 18, 2022; 7:00 p.m., CBSSN		at Boise State	L 56–62	8–7 (1–3)	ExtraMile Arena (6,993); Boise, ID
January 20, 2022; 7:00 p.m., MW Network		UNLV; Rescheduled from January 8	W 69–62	9–7 (2–3)	Clune Arena (934); Colorado Springs, CO
January 22, 2022; 12:00 p.m., FS1		Colorado State	L 53–73	9–8 (2–4)	Clune Arena (2,579); Colorado Springs, CO
January 25, 2022; 8:00 p.m., MW Network		at San Jose State	W 63–53	10–8 (3–4)	Provident Credit Union Event Center (1,743); San Jose, CA
January 28, 2022; 4:00 p.m., MW Network		Wyoming	L 61–63	10–9 (3–5)	Clune Arena (1,702); Colorado Springs, CO
February 1, 2022; 7:00 p.m., MW Network		at Utah State	L 46–73	10–10 (3–6)	Smith Spectrum (7,545); Logan, UT
February 5, 2022; 6:00 p.m., CBSSN		New Mexico	L 77–91	10–11 (3–7)	Clune Arena (2,723); Colorado Springs, CO
February 8, 2022; 8:00 p.m., MW Network		at UNLV	L 44–78	10–12 (3–8)	Thomas & Mack Center (5,312); Paradise, NV
February 12, 2022; 6:00 p.m., CBSSN		at San Diego State	L 64–76	10–13 (3–9)	Viejas Arena (10,784); San Diego, CA
February 16, 2022; 8:00 p.m., FS1		Boise State	L 59–85	10–14 (3–10)	Clune Arena (1,850); Colorado Springs, CO
February 19, 2022; 2:00 p.m., MW Network		at No. 22 Wyoming	L 67–75	10–15 (3–11)	Arena-Auditorium (8,312); Laramie, WY
February 22, 2022; 7:00 p.m., MW Network		Fresno State	L 40–65	10–16 (3–12)	Clune Arena (545); Colorado Springs, CO
February 26, 2022; 2:00 p.m., Stadium		at New Mexico	L 65–69	10–17 (3–13)	The Pit (9,089); Albuquerque, NM
March 1, 2022; 7:00 p.m., MW Network		San Jose State	W 58–54	11–17 (4–13)	Clune Arena (1,275); Colorado Springs, CO
Mountain West tournament
March 9, 2022; 2:30 p.m., Stadium	(10)	vs. (7) Utah State; First round	L 56–83	11–18	Thomas & Mack Center; Paradise, NV
*Non-conference game. ^{#}Rankings from AP poll. (#) Tournament seedings in parentheses. All times are in Mountain.
