= 2021–22 Wyoming Cowboys basketball team =

American college basketball season

2021–22 Wyoming Cowboys basketball

NCAA tournament, First Four
- Conference: Mountain West Conference
- Record: 25–9 (13–5 MW)
- Head coach: Jeff Linder (2nd season)
- Assistant coaches: Ken DeWeese; Shaun Vandiver; Sundance Wicks
- Home arena: Arena-Auditorium

2021–22 Mountain West Conference men's basketball standings
	Conf.				Overall
Team	W		L	PCT	W		L	PCT
No. 23 Boise State †	15	–	3	.833	27	–	8	.771
No. 24 Colorado State	14	–	4	.778	25	–	6	.806
San Diego State	13	–	4	.765	23	–	9	.719
Wyoming	13	–	5	.722	25	–	9	.735
UNLV	10	–	8	.556	18	–	14	.563
Fresno State	8	–	9	.471	23	–	13	.639
Utah State	8	–	10	.444	18	–	16	.529
Nevada	6	–	12	.333	13	–	18	.419
New Mexico	5	–	12	.294	13	–	19	.406
Air Force	4	–	13	.235	11	–	18	.379
San Jose State	1	–	17	.056	8	–	23	.258
† Conference tournament winner Rankings from AP poll

The 2021–22 Wyoming Cowboys basketball team represented the University of Wyoming during the 2021–22 NCAA Division I men's basketball season. They were led by Jeff Linder in his second year as head coach at Wyoming. The Cowboys played their home games at the Arena-Auditorium in Laramie, Wyoming as members of the Mountain West Conference. They finished the season 25–9, 13–5 in MWC play to finish in fourth place. They defeated UNLV in the quarterfinals of the MWC tournament before losing to Boise State in the semifinals. They received an at-large bid to the NCAA tournament as a No. 12 seed in the East region, where they lost in the First Four to Indiana.

On February 14, 2022, the Cowboys were ranked No. 22 in the AP poll for the first time since 2015.

== Previous season ==
In a season limited due to the ongoing COVID-19 pandemic, the Cowboys finished the 2020–21 season 14–11, 7–9 in Mountain West play to finish in eighth place in the conference. In the Mountain West tournament, they defeated San Jose State before losing to San Diego State in the quarterfinals.

== Offseason ==
=== Departures ===
Name	Number	Pos.	Height	Weight	Year	Hometown	Reason for departure
Marcus Williams	1	G	6'2'	180	Freshman	Dickinson, TX	Transferred to Texas A&M
Drew LaMont	2	F	6'8"	225	Junior	Plantation, FL	Transferred to Georgetown (KY)
Kwane Marble II	3	G	6'6"	195	Sophomore	Denver, CO	Transferred to Loyola Marymount

=== Incoming transfers ===
Name	Number	Pos.	Height	Weight	Year	Hometown	Previous School
Deng Dut	2	G	6'4"	192	Junior	Melbourne, Australia	Junior college transferred from College of Southern Idaho
Brendan Wenzel	5	G	6'7"	203	RS sophomore	San Antonio, TX	Transferred from Utah in December during the 2020–21 season. Under NCAA transfer rules, Wenzel had to sit out until December, and was eligible to start in January during the 2021–22 season.

=== 2021 recruiting class ===
College recruiting
Name	Hometown	School	Height	Weight	Commit date
Ben Bowen; G	Highlands Ranch, CO	Mountain Vista HS	6 ft 5 in (1.96 m)	180 lb (82 kg)	Nov 11, 2020
Ben Bowen; G	Recruit ratings: Scout: Rivals: 247Sports: ESPN:				
Nate Barnhart; F	Lenexa, KS	De Soto HS	7 ft 0 in (2.13 m)	185 lb (84 kg)	Nov 11, 2020
Nate Barnhart; F	Recruit ratings: Scout: Rivals: 247Sports: ESPN:				
Noah Reynolds; G	Peoria, IL	Peoria Notre Dame HS	6 ft 3 in (1.91 m)	190 lb (86 kg)	Apr 21, 2021
Noah Reynolds; G	Recruit ratings: Scout: Rivals: 247Sports: ESPN:				
Overall recruit ranking: Scout: – Rivals: —
Note: In many cases, Scout, Rivals, 247Sports, On3, and ESPN may conflict in their listings of height and weight.; In these cases, the average was taken. ESPN grades are on a 100-point scale.; Sources: "ESPN – Wyoming Cowboys Basketball Recruiting 2021". ESPN.; "2021 Team Ranking". Rivals.

== Roster ==
2021–22 Wyoming Cowboys men's basketball team
Players
Coaches

Pos.	#	Name	Height	Weight	Year	Previous school	Hometown
G	0	Drake Jeffries	6 ft 5 in (1.96 m)	186 lb (84 kg)	RS Sr	Indian Hills CC; Mattoon HS	Mattoon, IL
G	2	Deng Dut	6 ft 4 in (1.93 m)	192 lb (87 kg)	Jr	Simonds Catholic College; College of Southern Idaho	Melbourne, Australia
G	5	Brendan Wenzel	6 ft 7 in (2.01 m)	203 lb (92 kg)	RS So	O'Connor HS; Utah	San Antonio, Texas
F	10	Hunter Thompson	6 ft 10 in (2.08 m)	232 lb (105 kg)	RS Sr	Pine Bluffs HS	Pine Bluffs, WY
F	11	Eoin Nelson	6 ft 10 in (2.08 m)	229 lb (104 kg)	Jr	Otero Junior College; UCD Marian	Dublin, IRE
F	15	Nate Barnhart	7 ft 0 in (2.13 m)	185 lb (84 kg)	Fr	DeSoto HS	Lenexa, KS
G	21	Noah Reynolds	6 ft 3 in (1.91 m)	202 lb (92 kg)	Fr	Notre Dame HS	Peoria, IL
G	22	Kenny Foster	6 ft 5 in (1.96 m)	194 lb (88 kg)	Jr	Smoky Hill HS	Aurora, CO
G	24	Hunter Maldonado	6 ft 7 in (2.01 m)	203 lb (92 kg)	RS Sr	Vista Ridge HS	Colorado Springs, CO
F	25	Jeremiah Oden	6 ft 8 in (2.03 m)	201 lb (91 kg)	So	Sunrise Christian Academy	Chicago, IL
G	31	Cort Roberson (W)	6 ft 0 in (1.83 m)	160 lb (73 kg)	Fr	Stanwood HS	Arlington, WA
F	33	Graham Ike	6 ft 9 in (2.06 m)	252 lb (114 kg)	So	Overland HS	Aurora, CO
G	40	Ben Bowen	6 ft 5 in (1.96 m)	170 lb (77 kg)	Fr	Mountain Vista HS	Highlands Ranch, CO
G	53	Xavier DuSell	6 ft 4 in (1.93 m)	190 lb (86 kg)	So	Arizona Compass Prep	Scottsdale, AZ
F	55	John Grigsby (W)	6 ft 9 in (2.06 m)	211 lb (96 kg)	So	Park Center HS	Louisville, CO

Head coach

- Jeff Linder (Western Colorado)

Assistant coach(es)

- Ken DeWeese (Mary Hardin–Baylor)
- Shaun Vandiver (Colorado)
- Sundance Wicks (Northern State)

Legend

- (C) Team captain
- (S) Suspended
- (I) Ineligible
- (W) Walk-on
- Injured
- Current redshirt

Roster

== Statistics ==
Player	GP	GS	MPG	FG%	3FG%	FT%	RPG	APG	SPG	BPG	PPG
Xavier DuSell	30	20	28.0	.356	.327	.767	2.3	1.0	.5	.1	7.5
Deng Dut	12	1	7.3	.100	.077	.750	.8	1.1	.3	.0	.7
Kenny Foster	9	0	10.7	.278	.154	1.000	2.0	.7	.4	.0	1.8
John Grigsby	7	0	1.8	.286	.167	.000	.3	.0	.0	.0	.7
Graham Ike	33	33	31.7	.510	.273	.716	9.6	1.3	.7	.3	19.5
Drake Jeffries	34	34	36.6	.435	.409	.811	5.4	.7	.6	.5	10.3
Hunter Maldonado	33	33	37.3	.495	.250	.711	5.7	6.3	1.2	.1	18.5
Eoin Nelson	8	0	2.5	1.000	.000	.000	.8	.0	.0	.0	1.0
Jeremiah Oden	34	32	26.6	.521	.306	.736	4.5	.4	.4	.8	7.8
Noah Reynolds	23	0	11.2	.373	.417	.565	1.0	.7	.2	.2	2.9
Hunter Thompson	34	3	11.2	.390	.373	.636	1.5	.3	.0	.1	2.7
Brendan Wenzel	34	14	23.0	.405	.358	.780	2.9	.5	.4	.1	5.2

== Schedule and results ==
Date time, TV	Rank^{#}	Opponent^{#}	Result	Record	High points	High rebounds	High assists	Site (attendance) city, state
Non-conference regular season
November 10, 2021*; 7:00 pm		Detroit Mercy	W 85–47	1–0	22 – Ike	7 – Jeffries	9 – Maldonado	Arena-Auditorium (3,259); Laramie, WY
November 14, 2021*; 2:00 pm		Arkansas–Pine Bluff	W 85–45	2–0	21 – Ike	8 – Ike	4 – Maldonado	Arena-Auditorium (3,023); Laramie, WY
November 18, 2021*; 9:00 p.m., P12N		at Washington	W 77–72 ^{OT}	3–0	26 – Ike	10 – Tied	2 – DuSell	Alaska Airlines Arena (5,670); Seattle, WA
November 22, 2021*; 7:00 p.m.		at Grand Canyon	W 68–61	4–0	17 – Maldonado	7 – Maldonado	7 – Maldonado	GCU Arena (6,872); Phoenix, AZ
November 28, 2021*; 7:00 p.m.		Hastings	W 108–59	5–0	33 – Jeffries	10 – Ike	7 – Dut	Arena-Auditorium (3,291); Laramie, WY
November 29, 2021*; 8:00 pm		at Cal State Fullerton	W 79–66	6–0	21 – Maldonado	9 – Ike	9 – Maldonado	Titan Gym (772); Fullerton, CA
December 2, 2021*; 7:00 pm		Denver	W 77–64	7–0	35 – Ike	14 – Ike	4 – DuSell	Arena-Auditorium (4,030); Laramie, WY
December 4, 2021*; 2:00 pm		McNeese State	W 79–58	8–0	20 – Maldonado	10 – Ike & Oden	5 – Maldonado	Arena-Auditorium (3,726); Laramie, WY
December 8, 2021*; 8:00 p.m., P12N		at No. 11 Arizona	L 65–94	8–1	22 – DuSell	4 – Tied	4 – Maldonado	McKale Center (13,077); Tucson, AZ
December 11, 2021*; 8:00 pm		Utah Valley	W 74–62	9–1	16 – DuSell	9 – Ike	5 – Maldonado	Arena-Auditorium (3,927); Laramie, WY
December 22, 2021*; 3:30 pm, ESPNU		vs. Stanford; Diamond Head Classic Quarterfinals	L 63–66	9–2	25 – Ike	11 – Ike	8 – Maldonado	Stan Sheriff Center (4,041); Honoulu, HI
December 23, 2021*; 4:30 pm, ESPNU		vs. Northern Iowa; Diamond Head Classic Consolation 2nd Round	W 71–69	10–2	17 – Maldonado	7 – Maldonado	6 – Maldonado	Stan Sheriff Center (3,951); Honolulu, HI
December 25, 2021*; 11:30 am, ESPNU		vs. South Florida; Diamond Head Classic 5th Place Game	W 77–57	11–2	22 – Maldonado	7 – Ike	10 – Maldonado	Stan Sheriff Center; Honolulu, HI
Mountain West regular season
January 15, 2022; 7:00 pm, Stadium		at Utah State	W 71–69	12–2 (1–0)	23 – Ike	8 – Ike	6 – Maldonado	Smith Spectrum (8,109); Logan, UT
January 17, 2022; 6:00 p.m., FS1		at Nevada; Rescheduled from January 4	W 77–67	13–2 (2–0)	24 – Ike	11 – Ike	11 – Maldonado	Lawlor Events Center (6,369); Reno, NV
January 19, 2022; 7:00 p.m., MW Network/ATTSN		San José State	W 84–69	14–2 (3–0)	20 – Maldonado	8 – Oden	12 – Maldonado	Arena-Auditorium (4,371); Laramie, WY
January 22, 2022; 5:30 p.m., CBSSN		New Mexico	W 93–91	15–2 (4–0)	29 – Ike	15 – Ike	7 – Maldonado	Arena-Auditorium (5,368); Laramie, WY
January 25, 2022; 7:00 p.m., Stadium		at Boise State	L 62–65	15–3 (4–1)	19 – Ike	9 – Ike	5 – Maldonado	ExtraMile Arena (8,292); Boise, ID
January 28, 2022; 4:00 p.m., MW Network		at Air Force	W 63–61	16–3 (5–1)	31 – Maldonado	9 – Ike	4 – Maldonado	Clune Arena (1,702); Colorado Springs, CO
January 31, 2022; 6:00 p.m., FS1		Colorado State; Border War	W 84–78 ^{OT}	17–3 (6–1)	35 – Maldonado	8 – Ike	7 – Maldonado	Arena-Auditorium (7,539); Laramie, WY
February 3, 2022; 7:00 p.m., MW Network		Boise State; Rescheduled from January 1	W 72–65	18–3 (7–1)	33 – Ike	10 – Tied	7 – Maldonado	Arena-Auditorium (7,063); Laramie, WY
February 6, 2022; 5:00 p.m., FS1		at Fresno State; Rescheduled from January 8	W 61–59	19–3 (8–1)	21 – Maldonado	9 – Jeffries	6 – Maldonado	Save Mart Center (6,017); Fresno, CA
February 8, 2022; 7:00 p.m., Stadium		Utah State	W 78–76 ^{OT}	20–3 (9–1)	28 – Ike	13 – Jeffries	5 – Maldonado	Arena-Auditorium (5,558); Laramie, WY
February 12, 2022; 7:00 p.m., Stadium		at San José State	W 74–52	21–3 (10–1)	25 – Ike	18 – Ike	5 – Maldonado	Provident Credit Union Event Center (2,251); San Jose, CA
February 15, 2022; 7:00 p.m., Stadium	No. 22	at New Mexico	L 66–75	21–4 (10–2)	26 – Ike	7 – Ike	4 – Maldonado	The Pit (8,208); Albuquerque, NM
February 19, 2022; 2:00 p.m., MW Network/ATTSN	No. 22	Air Force	W 75–67	22–4 (11–2)	29 – Maldonado	12 – Ike	8 – Maldonado	Arena-Auditorium (8,312); Laramie, WY
February 23, 2022; 7:00 p.m., CBSSN		at Colorado State; Border War	L 55–61	22–5 (11–3)	22 – Jefferies	13 – Ike	3 – Tied	Moby Arena (8,085); Fort Collins, CO
February 26, 2022; 6:00 p.m., CBSSN		Nevada	W 74–61	23–5 (12–3)	23 – Ike	15 – Ike	6 – Maldonado	Arena-Auditorium (7,855); Laramie, WY
February 28, 2022; 7:00 p.m., CBSSN		San Diego State	L 66–73	23–6 (12–4)	17 – Oden	11 – Maldonado	11 – Maldonado	Arena-Auditorium (5,438); Laramie, WY
March 2, 2022; 8:30 p.m., FS1		at UNLV	L 57–64	23–7 (12–5)	22 – Maldonado	10 – Maldonado	7 – Maldonado	Thomas & Mack Center (6,204); Paradise, NV
March 5, 2022; 2:00 p.m., Stadium		Fresno State	W 68–64 ^{OT}	24–7 (13–5)	21 – DuSell	8 – Ike	8 – Maldonado	Arena-Auditorium (6,230); Laramie, WY
Mountain West tournament
March 10, 2022; 3:30 p.m., CBSSN	(4)	at (5) UNLV; Quarterfinals	W 59–56	25–7	12 – Wenzel	13 – Ike	5 – Maldonado	Thomas & Mack Center; Paradise, NV
March 11, 2022; 7:30 p.m., CBSSN	(4)	vs. (1) Boise State; Semifinals	L 61–68	25–8	18 – Ike	9 – Maldonado	5 – Maldonado	Thomas & Mack Center; Paradise, NV
NCAA tournament
March 15, 2022; 7:10 pm, TruTV	(12 E)	vs. (12 E) Indiana; First Four	L 58–66	25–9	21 – Maldonado	10 – Jeffries	5 – Maldonado	UD Arena (12,522); Dayton, OH
*Non-conference game. ^{#}Rankings from AP Poll. (#) Tournament seedings in parentheses. All times are in Mountain Time.
