= 2021–22 Fresno State Bulldogs men's basketball team =

2021–22 Fresno State Bulldogs men's basketball

SoCal Challenge Surf Division Champions

The Basketball Classic Champions
- Conference: Mountain West Conference
- Record: 23–13 (8–9 MW)
- Head coach: Justin Hutson (4th season)
- Assistant coaches: Tarvish Felton; Keith Brown; Tim Shelton
- Home arena: Save Mart Center (Capacity: 15,596)

2021–22 Mountain West Conference men's basketball standings
	Conf.				Overall
Team	W		L	PCT	W		L	PCT
No. 23 Boise State †	15	–	3	.833	27	–	8	.771
No. 24 Colorado State	14	–	4	.778	25	–	6	.806
San Diego State	13	–	4	.765	23	–	9	.719
Wyoming	13	–	5	.722	25	–	9	.735
UNLV	10	–	8	.556	18	–	14	.563
Fresno State	8	–	9	.471	23	–	13	.639
Utah State	8	–	10	.444	18	–	16	.529
Nevada	6	–	12	.333	13	–	18	.419
New Mexico	5	–	12	.294	13	–	19	.406
Air Force	4	–	13	.235	11	–	18	.379
San Jose State	1	–	17	.056	8	–	23	.258
† Conference tournament winner Rankings from AP poll

The 2021–22 Fresno State Bulldogs men's basketball team represented California State University, Fresno in the 2021–22 NCAA Division I men's basketball season. The Bulldogs were led by fourth-year head coach Justin Hutson and played their home games at the Save Mart Center as members of the Mountain West Conference.

== Previous season ==
In a season limited due to the ongoing COVID-19 pandemic, the Bulldogs finished the 2020–21 season 12–12, 9–11 in Mountain West play to finish in sixth place. They defeated New Mexico in the first round of the Mountain West tournament before losing to Colorado State in the quarterfinals.

== Offseason ==
=== Departures ===
Name	Number	Pos.	Height	Weight	Year	Hometown	Reason for departure
Devin Gage	1	G	6'2"	205	Senior	Chicago, IL	Graduate transferred
Christian Gray	11	F	6'6"	250	RS Senior	Moreno Valley, CA	Graduated
Alec Hickman	20	G	6'4"	190	RS Junior	Riverside, CA	Transferred to Alabama A&M
Assane Diouf	21	C	7'2"	250	RS Sophomore	Dakar, Senegal	Transferred to Austin Peay

=== Incoming transfers ===
Name	Number	Pos.	Height	Weight	Year	Hometown	Previous college
Jemarl Baker Jr.	1	G	6'5"	195	RS Senior	Menifee, CA	Arizona
Donovan Yap	11	G	6'3"	175	Sophomore	Las Vegas, NV	UNLV

=== Recruiting classes ===
==== 2021 recruiting class ====
College recruiting information
Name	Hometown	School	Height	Weight	Commit date
Robert Vaihola; PF	Archbishop Riordan High School	San Francisco, CA	6 ft 8 in (2.03 m)	N/A	May 2, 2021
Robert Vaihola; PF	Recruit ratings: Scout: Rivals: 247Sports: ESPN: (0)				
Overall recruit ranking: Scout: – Rivals: –
Note: In many cases, Scout, Rivals, 247Sports, On3, and ESPN may conflict in their listings of height and weight.; In these cases, the average was taken. ESPN grades are on a 100-point scale.; Sources: "Fresno State Commit List for 2021". Rivals.; "Men's Basketball Recruiting". Scout.; "ESPN – Fresno State Bulldogs Basketball Recruiting 2021". ESPN.; "Scout.com Team Recruiting Rankings". Scout.; "2021 Team Ranking". Rivals.

==== 2022 Recruiting class ====
College recruiting information (2022)
Name	Hometown	School	Height	Weight	Commit date
Joseph Hunter #30 SG	Fresno, CA	San Joaquin Memorial High School	6 ft 3 in (1.91 m)	185 lb (84 kg)	Jul 30, 2021
Joseph Hunter #30 SG	Recruit ratings: Scout: Rivals: 247Sports: ESPN: (82)				
Overall recruit ranking: Scout: – Rivals: –
Note: In many cases, Scout, Rivals, 247Sports, On3, and ESPN may conflict in their listings of height and weight.; In these cases, the average was taken. ESPN grades are on a 100-point scale.; Sources: "Fresno State Commit List for 2022". Rivals.; "Men's Basketball Recruiting". Scout.; "ESPN – Fresno State Bulldogs Basketball Recruiting 2022". ESPN.; "Scout.com Team Recruiting Rankings". Scout.; "2022 Team Ranking". Rivals.

== Roster ==
2021–22 Fresno State Bulldogs men's basketball team
Players
Coaches

Pos.	#	Name	Height	Weight	Year	Previous school	Hometown
G	0	Kyle Harding	6 ft 3 in (1.91 m)	185 lb (84 kg)	Jr	Allan Hancock College	Roosevelt, NY
G	2	Jemarl Baker Jr.	6 ft 5 in (1.96 m)	195 lb (88 kg)	RS Sr	Arizona	Menifee, CA
G	3	Isaiah Hill	6 ft 0 in (1.83 m)	165 lb (75 kg)	Jr	Tulsa	Bakersfield, CA
G	4	Junior Ballard	6 ft 3 in (1.91 m)	185 lb (84 kg)	Sr	Cal Poly	Stockton, CA
G	5	Jordan Campbell	6 ft 4 in (1.93 m)	195 lb (88 kg)	RS Jr	Oregon State	Adelanto, CA
F	10	Orlando Robinson	7 ft 0 in (2.13 m)	235 lb (107 kg)	Jr	Middlebrooks Academy	Las Vegas, NV
G	11	Donavan Yap	6 ft 5 in (1.96 m)	185 lb (84 kg)	So	UNLV	Las Vegas, NV
G	13	Deon Stroud	6 ft 5 in (1.96 m)	200 lb (91 kg)	Jr	UTEP	Fresno, CA
G	22	Destin Whitaker	6 ft 5 in (1.96 m)	185 lb (84 kg)	So	Romeoville HS	Romeoville, IL
G/F	23	Leo Colimerio	6 ft 7 in (2.01 m)	190 lb (86 kg)	So	Wasatch Academy	São Paulo, Brazil
G	25	Anthony Holland	6 ft 5 in (1.96 m)	225 lb (102 kg)	Jr	Notre Dame HS	Riverside, CA
F	30	Robert Vaihola	6 ft 8 in (2.03 m)	245 lb (111 kg)	Fr	Archbishop Riordan HS	San Francisco, CA
G	33	Steven Vasquez (W)	6 ft 2 in (1.88 m)	170 lb (77 kg)	Fr	St. Joseph HS	Santa Maria, CA
C	34	Braxton Meah	7 ft 1 in (2.16 m)	250 lb (113 kg)	So	San Joaquin Memorial HS	Fresno, CA

Head coach

- Justin Hutson (Cal State Bakersfield)

Assistant coach(es)

- Tarvish Felton (Southern Utah)
- Keith Brown (Pacific)
- Tim Shelton (San Diego State)

Legend

- (C) Team captain
- (S) Suspended
- (I) Ineligible
- (W) Walk-on
- Injured
- Current redshirt

Roster

== Schedule and results ==
Date time, TV	Rank^{#}	Opponent^{#}	Result	Record	High points	High rebounds	High assists	Site (attendance) city, state
Exhibition
November 3, 2021*; 7:00 p.m., MW Network		Stanislaus State	W 86–48	–	24 – Robinson, Jr.	7 – Robinson, Jr.	3 – Tied	Save Mart Center (2,463); Fresno, CA
Non-conference regular season
November 9, 2021*; 7:00 p.m., MW Network		Fresno Pacific	W 74–54	1–0	16 – Robinson, Jr.	9 – Colimerio	5 – Hill	Save Mart Center (2,820); Fresno, CA
November 11, 2021*; 7:00 p.m., MW Network		LIU	W 84–60	2–0	17 – Robinson, Jr.	19 – Robinson, Jr.	5 – Baker	Save Mart Center (3,438); Fresno, CA
November 15, 2021*; 7:00 p.m., MW Network		Idaho; SoCal Challenge campus-site game	W 69–62	3–0	27 – Robinson, Jr.	10 – Robinson, Jr.	5 – Hill	Save Mart Center (3,388); Fresno, CA
November 22, 2021*; 10:00 p.m., CBSSN		vs. Pepperdine; SoCal Challenge Surf Division semifinals	W 70–63	4–0	19 – Hill	6 – Robinson, Jr.	4 – Robinson, Jr.	The Pavilion at JSerra; San Juan Capistrano, CA
November 24, 2021*; 10:00 p.m., CBSSN		vs. Santa Clara; SoCal Challenge Surf Division championship	W 59–52	5–0	22 – Robinson, Jr.	8 – Robinson, Jr.	4 – Holland	The Pavilion at JSerra (1,700); San Juan Capistrano, CA
November 28, 2021*; 6:00 p.m., P12N		at California	L 57–65	5–1	25 – Robinson, Jr.	9 – Robinson, Jr.	4 – Holland	Haas Pavilion (3,857); Berkeley, CA
December 1, 2021*; 7:00 p.m., MW Network		San Diego	W 63–43	6–1	15 – Robinson, Jr.	8 – Holland	5 – Robinson, Jr.	Save Mart Center (3,132); Fresno, CA
December 4, 2021*; 7:00 p.m., MW Network		Cal State Northridge	W 61–43	7–1	22 – Robinson, Jr.	9 – Tied	5 – Holland	Save Mart Center (3,762); Fresno, CA
December 8, 2021*; 7:00 p.m., WCC Network		at San Francisco	L 63–71	7–2	19 – Holland	9 – Holland	3 – Hill	War Memorial Gymnasium (1,873); San Francisco, CA
December 11, 2021*; 4:00 p.m., MW Network		UC Irvine	W 63–55	8–2	18 – Baker	8 – Robinson, Jr.	3 – Tied	Save Mart Center (4,501); Fresno, CA
December 17, 2021*; 7:00 p.m., MW Network		Cal Poly	W 83–48	9–2	18 – Tied	10 – Colimeiro	4 – Tied	Save Mart Center (4,461); Fresno, CA
December 21, 2021*; 4:00 p.m., P12N		at Utah	L 50–55	9–3	17 – Robinson, Jr.	10 – Stroud	4 – Stroud	Jon M. Huntsman Center (7,673); Salt Lake City, UT
December 23, 2021*; 6:00 p.m., ESPN+		at Weber State	W 69–43	10–3	22 – Robinson, Jr.	9 – Robinson, Jr.	6 – Hill	Dee Events Center (2,631); Ogden, UT
Mountain West regular season
December 28, 2021; 6:00 p.m., Stadium		at Boise State	L 55–65	10–4 (0–1)	22 – Robinson, Jr.	5 – Robinson, Jr.	3 – Robinson, Jr.	ExtraMile Arena; Boise, ID
January 1, 2022; 1:00 p.m.		Air Force	Canceled					Save Mart Center; Fresno, CA
January 11, 2022; 7:00 p.m.		San José State	W 79–59	11–4 (1–1)	31 – Robinson, Jr.	12 – Robinson, Jr.	5 – Holland	Save Mart Center (2,579); Fresno, CA
January 14, 2022; 8:00 p.m., FS1		at UNLV	W 73–68	12–4 (2–1)	24 – Robinson, Jr.	11 – Robinson, Jr.	3 – Hill	Thomas & Mack Center (4,976); Paradise, NV
January 18, 2022; 8:00 p.m., CBSSN		Utah State	W 61–54	13–4 (3–1)	14 – Stroud	13 – Robinson, Jr.	6 – Robinson, Jr.	Save Mart Center (5,013); Fresno, CA
January 21, 2022; 8:00 p.m., FS1		at Nevada	L 73–77	13–5 (3–2)	26 – Robinson, Jr.	12 – Robinson, Jr.	4 – Tied	Lawlor Events Center (6,944); Reno, NV
January 25, 2022; 6:00 p.m., Stadium		at New Mexico	W 65–60	14–5 (4–2)	22 – Holland	10 – Vaihola	3 – Robinson	The Pit (8,033); Albuquerque, NM
January 28, 2022; 7:30 p.m., FS1		Boise State	L 63–68 ^{OT}	14–6 (4–3)	21 – Robinson	10 – Colimerio	3 – Holland	Save Mart Center (8,250); Fresno, CA
February 1, 2022; 8:00 p.m., CBSSN		at San José State	W 73–43	15–6 (5–3)	18 – Robinson, Jr.	6 – Colimerio	5 – Robinson, Jr.	Provident Credit Union Event Center (2,118); San Jose, CA
February 4, 2022; 8:00 p.m., FS1		Nevada	W 73–56	16–6 (6–3)	21 – Holland	10 – Holland	6 – Hill	Save Mart Center (5,897); Fresno, CA
February 6, 2022; 4:00 p.m, FS1		Wyoming; Rescheduled from January 8	L 59–61	16–7 (6–4)	25 – Hill	10 – Robinson, Jr.	3 – Holland	Save Mart Center (6,017); Fresno, CA
February 11, 2022; 6:30 p.m., CBSSN		at Colorado State	L 50–65	16–8 (6–5)	24 – Robinson, Jr.	12 – Holland	5 – Hill	Moby Arena (8,083); Fort Collins, CO
February 16, 2022; 7:30 p.m., CBSSN		UNLV	L 57–60	16–9 (6–6)	14 – Tied	6 – Campbell	4 – Hill	Save Mart Center (4,723); Fresno, CA
February 19, 2022; 7:00 p.m., CBSSN		San Diego State	L 44–61	16–10 (6–7)	15 – Hill	8 – Robinson	2 – Tied	Save Mart Center (7,261); Fresno, CA
February 22, 2022; 6:00 p.m., MW Network		at Air Force	W 65–40	17–10 (7–7)	26 – Robinson	8 – Meah	4 – Hill	Clune Arena (545); Colorado Springs, CO
February 28, 2022; 7:00 p.m., FS1		New Mexico	W 71–68	18–10 (8–7)	28 – Robinson, Jr.	10 – Robinson, Jr.	5 – Tied	Save Mart Center (4,131); Fresno, CA
March 3, 2022; 8:00 p.m., CBSSN		at San Diego State	L 64–65 ^{2OT}	18–11 (8–8)	19 – Campbell	11 – Robinson Jr.	4 – Hill	Viejas Arena (12,414); San Diego, CA
March 5, 2022; 1:00 p.m., MWN		at Wyoming	L 64–68 ^{OT}	18–12 (8–9)	34 – Robinson, Jr.	9 – Robinson, Jr.	5 – Robinson, Jr.	Arena-Auditorium (6,230); Laramie, WY
Mountain West tournament
March 9, 2022; 4:00 p.m., Stadium	(6)	vs. (11) San José State; First Round	W 69–67 ^{OT}	19–12	31 – Robinson, Jr.	12 – Holland	3 – Tied	Thomas & Mack Center; Paradise, NV
March 10, 2022; 8:30 p.m., CBSSN	(6)	vs. (3) San Diego State; Quarterfinals	L 46–53	19–13	25 – Robinson, Jr.	11 – Robinson, Jr.	3 – Tied	Thomas & Mack Center; Paradise, NV
The Basketball Classic
March 17, 2022*; 7:00 p.m., ESPN+		Eastern Washington; First round	W 83–74	20–13	18 – Holland	9 – Colimerio	5 – Robinson, Jr.	Save Mart Center (1,166); Fresno, CA
March 23, 2022*; 7:00 p.m., ESPN+		Youngstown State; Second round	W 80–71	21–13	16 – Robinson, Jr.	13 – Robinson, Jr.	5 – Tied	Save Mart Center (1,754); Fresno, CA
March 28, 2022*; 7:00 p.m., ESPN+		Southern Utah; Semifinals	W 67–48	22–13	20 – Robinson, Jr.	7 – Tied	7 – Hill	Save Mart Center (3,006); Fresno, CA
April 1, 2022*; 6:00 p.m., ESPN+		at Coastal Carolina; Championship	W 85–74	23–13	20 – Robinson	14 – Robinson	6 – Hill	HTC Center (1,407); Conway, SC
*Non-conference game. ^{#}Rankings from AP Poll. (#) Tournament seedings in parentheses. All times are in Pacific Time.
