= 2021–22 Boise State Broncos men's basketball team =

American college basketball season

2021–22 Boise State Broncos men's basketball

Mountain West regular season champions Mountain West tournament champions

NCAA tournament, First Round
- Conference: Mountain West Conference

Ranking
- AP: No. 23
- Record: 27–8 (15–3 MW)
- Head coach: Leon Rice (12th season)
- Assistant coaches: Mike Burns; Tim Duryea; R-Jay Barsh
- Home arena: ExtraMile Arena

2021–22 Mountain West Conference men's basketball standings
	Conf.				Overall
Team	W		L	PCT	W		L	PCT
No. 23 Boise State †	15	–	3	.833	27	–	8	.771
No. 24 Colorado State	14	–	4	.778	25	–	6	.806
San Diego State	13	–	4	.765	23	–	9	.719
Wyoming	13	–	5	.722	25	–	9	.735
UNLV	10	–	8	.556	18	–	14	.563
Fresno State	8	–	9	.471	23	–	13	.639
Utah State	8	–	10	.444	18	–	16	.529
Nevada	6	–	12	.333	13	–	18	.419
New Mexico	5	–	12	.294	13	–	19	.406
Air Force	4	–	13	.235	11	–	18	.379
San Jose State	1	–	17	.056	8	–	23	.258
† Conference tournament winner Rankings from AP poll

The 2021–22 Boise State Broncos men's basketball team represented Boise State University in the Mountain West Conference during the 2021–22 NCAA Division I men's basketball season. Led by twelfth-year head coach Leon Rice, the Broncos played their home games on campus at ExtraMile Arena in Boise, Idaho. They finished the regular season at 24–7 (15–3 in Mountain West, first).

The top seed in the conference tournament, Boise State defeated Nevada, Wyoming, and San Diego State to win the title and the automatic bid to the NCAA tournament. Seeded eighth in the West region, the Broncos traveled west to Portland, but lost in the first round to Memphis and finished at 27–8.

== Previous season ==
In a season limited due to the ongoing COVID-19 pandemic, the Broncos finished the 2020–21 regular season at 18–7 (14–6 in Mountain West, fourth). They lost in the quarterfinals of the conference tournament to Nevada, and received an at-large bid to the National Invitation Tournament. The Broncos traveled to Texas and defeated SMU in the first round, but fell to eventual champion Memphis in the quarterfinals to finish the season at 19–9 overall.

== Offseason ==
=== Departures ===
Name	Number	Pos.	Height	Weight	Year	Hometown	Reason for departure
RayJ Dennis	10	G	6'2"	177	Sophomore	Oswego, IL	Transferred to Toledo
Donovan Ivory	15	G	6'6"	190	Sophomore	Appleton, WI	Transferred to Green Bay
Derrick Alston Jr.	21	G	6'9"	190	RS senior	Houston, TX	Graduated

=== 2021 recruiting class ===
College recruiting
Name	Hometown	School	Height	Weight	Commit date
RJ Keene #44 SG	The Woodlands, TX	Concordia Lutheran High School	6 ft 5 in (1.96 m)	185 lb (84 kg)	Nov 20, 2020
RJ Keene #44 SG	Recruit ratings: Scout: Rivals: (78)				
Tyson Degenhart; PF	Spokane, WA	Mead High School	6 ft 8 in (2.03 m)	205 lb (93 kg)	Nov 20, 2020
Tyson Degenhart; PF	Recruit ratings: Scout: Rivals: (0)				
Kobe Young; SF	Pasco, WA	Chiawana High School	6 ft 5 in (1.96 m)	205 lb (93 kg)	Apr 20, 2021
Kobe Young; SF	Recruit ratings: Scout: Rivals: (0)				
Overall recruit ranking: Scout: – Rivals: –
Note: In many cases, Scout, Rivals, 247Sports, On3, and ESPN may conflict in their listings of height and weight.; In these cases, the average was taken. ESPN grades are on a 100-point scale.; Sources: "2021 Team Ranking". Rivals.

== Roster ==
2021–22 Boise State Broncos men's basketball team
Players
Coaches

Pos.	#	Name	Height	Weight	Year	Previous school	Hometown
G	1	Kasean Pryor	6 ft 9 in (2.06 m)	200 lb (91 kg)	So	Pioneer HS	Chicago, IL
F	2	Tyson Degenhart	6 ft 7 in (2.01 m)	232 lb (105 kg)	Fr	Mt. Spokane HS	Spokane, WA
G	3	Kobe Young	6 ft 6 in (1.98 m)	204 lb (93 kg)	Fr	Chiawana HS	Pasco, WA
F	4	Burke Smith	6 ft 11 in (2.11 m)	230 lb (104 kg)	So	Trinity Episcopal School	Glen Allen, VA
G	5	RJ Keene	6 ft 6 in (1.98 m)	202 lb (92 kg)	Fr	Concordia Lutheran HS	The Woodlands, TX
G	10	Marcus Shaver Jr.	6 ft 2 in (1.88 m)	185 lb (84 kg)	RS Sr	Shadow Mountain HS; Portland	Phoenix, AZ
G	12	Max Rice (W)	6 ft 5 in (1.96 m)	200 lb (91 kg)	RS Jr	Bishop Kelly HS	Boise, ID
G	13	Pavle Kuzmanovic	6 ft 5 in (1.96 m)	190 lb (86 kg)	So	ABS Primorje 1945	Lužnica, Serbia
G	14	Emmanuel Akot	6 ft 8 in (2.03 m)	210 lb (95 kg)	RS Sr	Wasatch Academy; Arizona	Winnipeg, MB
G	22	Sam Winter (W)	6 ft 2 in (1.88 m)	185 lb (84 kg)	So	Montesano HS	Montesano, WA
F	23	Naje Smith	6 ft 7 in (2.01 m)	205 lb (93 kg)	Sr	Lewis and Clark HS; Cochise College	Spokane, WA
F	24	Abu Kigab	6 ft 7 in (2.01 m)	220 lb (100 kg)	GS	Prolific Prep; Oregon	St. Catharines, ON
C	25	Lukas Milner	6 ft 10 in (2.08 m)	238 lb (108 kg)	Sr	Olathe North HS	Olathe, KS
F	33	Mladen Armus	6 ft 10 in (2.08 m)	240 lb (109 kg)	RS Sr	Southwest Christian Academy; ETSU	Belgrade, Serbia

Head coach

- Leon Rice (Washington State)

Assistant coach(es)

- Mike Burns (Central Washington)
- Tim Duryea (North Texas)
- R-Jay Barsh (Puget Sound)

Legend

- (C) Team captain
- (S) Suspended
- (I) Ineligible
- (W) Walk-on
- Injured
- Current redshirt

Roster

== Schedule and results ==
Date time, TV	Rank^{#}	Opponent^{#}	Result	Record	High points	High rebounds	High assists	Site (attendance) city, state
Non-conference regular season
November 9, 2021*; 7:00 p.m., MW Network		Utah Valley	W 76–56	1–0	18 – Doutrive	7 – Kigab	3 – Kigab	ExtraMile Arena (7,457); Boise, ID
November 13, 2021*; 7:00 p.m., ESPN+		at UC Irvine	L 50–58	1–1	14 – Shaver Jr.	10 – Armus	3 – Akot	Bren Events Center (2,197); Irvine, CA
November 18, 2021*; 12:00 p.m., ESPN2		vs. No. 22 St. Bonaventure; Charleston Classic Quarterfinals	L 61–67	1–2	24 – Akot	10 – Armus	3 – Tied	TD Arena; Charleston, SC
November 19, 2021*; 10:00 a.m., ESPNU		vs. Temple; Charleston Classic consolation round	W 82–62	2–2	16 – Akot	6 – Doutrive	6 – Tied	TD Arena; Charleston, SC
November 21, 2021*; 11:00 a.m., ESPN2		vs. Ole Miss; Charleston Classic Consolation – 5th Place	W 60–50	3–2	13 – Shaver Jr.	13 – Armus	2 – Shaver Jr.	TD Arena (2,407); Charleston, SC
November 26, 2021*; 7:00 p.m., MW Network		Cal State Bakersfield	L 39–46	3–3	15 – Doutrive	9 – Armus	2 – Shaver Jr.	ExtraMile Arena (7,429); Boise, ID
November 30, 2021*; 7:00 p.m., Stadium		Saint Louis	L 82–86 ^{OT}	3–4	27 – Kigab	10 – Armus	3 – Tied	ExtraMile Arena (6,765); Boise, ID
December 3, 2021*; 7:00 p.m., MW Network		Tulsa	W 63–58	4–4	17 – Shaver Jr.	8 – Shaver Jr.	7 – Shaver Jr.	ExtraMile Arena (6,684); Boise, ID
December 7, 2021*; 8:00 p.m., ESPN+		at Cal State Northridge	W 74–48	5–4	21 – Degenhart	7 – Shaver Jr.	7 – Akot	Matadome (448); Northridge, CA
December 10, 2021*; 7:00 p.m., MW Network		Prairie View A&M	W 97–60	6–4	32 – Kigab	10 – Kigab	3 – Shaver Jr.	ExtraMile Arena (6,640); Boise, ID
December 14, 2021*; 7:00 p.m., CBSSN		Santa Clara	W 72–60	7–4	18 – Degenhart	12 – Armus	4 – Akot	ExtraMile Arena (6,187); Boise, ID
December 19, 2021*; 4:00 p.m., MW Network		Montana Tech	W 88–57	8–4	16 – Akot	15 – Armus	7 – Akot	ExtraMile Arena (6,429); Boise, ID
December 22, 2021*; 6:00 p.m., P12N		vs. Washington State; Spokane Showcase	W 58–52	9–4	19 – Kigab	6 – Tied	1 – Tied	Spokane Arena (4,018); Spokane, WA
Mountain West regular season
December 28, 2021; 7:00 p.m., Stadium		Fresno State	W 65–55	10–4 (1–0)	18 – Shaver Jr.	8 – Kigab	6 – Kigab	ExtraMile Arena; Boise, ID
January 12, 2022; 8:30 p.m., FS1		at Nevada	W 85–70	11–4 (2–0)	28 – Shaver Jr.	12 – Armus	5 – Akot	Lawlor Events Center (6,386); Reno, NV
January 15, 2022; 3:30 p.m., FS1		at New Mexico	W 71–63	12–4 (3–0)	18 – Shaver Jr.	13 – Armus	3 – Akot	The Pit (8,279); Albuquerque, NM
January 18, 2022; 7:00 p.m., CBSSN		Air Force	W 62–56	13–4 (4–0)	19 – Degenhart	5 – Kigab	3 – Kigab	ExtraMile Arena (6,993); Boise, ID
January 20, 2022; 7:00 p.m., MW Network		at Utah State; Rescheduled from January 4	W 62–59	14–4 (5–0)	22 – Armus	19 – Armus	2 – Tied	Smith Spectrum (7,548); Logan, UT
January 22, 2022; 7:30 p.m., CBSSN		at San Diego State	W 42–37	15–4 (6–0)	14 – Degenhart	8 – Tied	2 – Akot	Viejas Arena (11,357); San Diego, CA
January 25, 2022; Stadium		Wyoming	W 65–62	16–4 (7–0)	18 – Kigab	5 – Tied	5 – Kigab	ExtraMile Arena (8,292); Boise, ID
January 28, 2022; 9:00 p.m., FS1		at Fresno State	W 68–63 ^{OT}	17–4 (8–0)	16 – Akot	7 – Akot	5 – Akot	Save Mart Center (8,250); Fresno, CA
February 3, 2022; 7:00 p.m., MW Network		at Wyoming; Rescheduled from January 1	L 65–72	17–5 (8–1)	26 – Kigab	6 – Armus	2 – Tied	Arena-Auditorium (7,063); Laramie, WY
February 5, 2022; 4:00 p.m., Stadium		San José State	W 76–60	18–5 (9–1)	23 – Degenhart	11 – Kigab	4 – Rice	ExtraMile Arena (10,456); Boise, ID
February 11, 2022; 9:00 p.m., FS1		UNLV	W 69–63	19–5 (10–1)	18 – Kigab	7 – Tied	3 – Shaver Jr.	ExtraMile Arena (7,660); Boise, ID
February 13, 2022; 2:00 p.m., FS1		Colorado State; Rescheduled from January 7	L 74–77 ^{OT}	19–6 (10–2)	17 – Rice	8 – Rice	5 – Shaver Jr.	ExtraMile Arena (6,684); Boise, ID
February 16, 2022; 8:00 p.m., FS1		at Air Force	W 85–59	20–6 (11–2)	20 – Shaver Jr.	6 – Degenhart	6 – Armus	Clune Arena (1,850); Colorado Springs, CO
February 19, 2022; 4:00 p.m., CBSSN		Utah State	W 68–57	21–6 (12–2)	20 – Shaver Jr	7 – Degenhart	2 – Shaver Jr	ExtraMile Arena (10,252); Boise, ID
February 22, 2022; 7:00 p.m., CBSSN		San Diego State	W 58–57	22–6 (13–2)	21 – Kigab	7 – Tied	2 – Shaver Jr.	ExtraMile Arena (9,193); Boise, ID
February 26, 2022; 8:00 p.m., CBSSN		at UNLV	W 86–76	23–6 (14–2)	27 – Shaver, Jr.	6 – Tied	3 – Akot	Thomas & Mack Center (7,136); Paradise, NV
March 1, 2022; 7:00 p.m., FS2		Nevada	W 73–67	24–6 (15–2)	23 – Kigab	8 – Armus	3 – Tied	ExtraMile Arena (11,954); Boise, ID
March 5, 2022; 6:30 p.m., CBSSN		at Colorado State	L 68–71	24–7 (15–3)	15 – Kigab	6 – Kigab	5 – Kigab	Moby Arena (8,083); Fort Collins, CO
Mountain West tournament
March 10, 2022; 1:00 p.m., CBSSN	(1)	vs. (8) Nevada; Quarterfinals	W 71–69	25–7	22 – Akot	8 – Shaver, Jr.	6 – Kigab	Thomas & Mack Center; Paradise, NV
March 11, 2022; 7:30 p.m., CBSSN	(1)	vs. (4) Wyoming; Semifinals	W 68–61	26–7	22 – Kigab	13 – Armus	4 – Kigab	Thomas & Mack Center; Paradise, NV
March 12, 2022; 4:00 p.m., CBS	(1)	vs. (3) San Diego State; Championship	W 53–52	27–7	13 – Degenhart	9 – Rice	3 – Tied	Thomas & Mack Center; Paradise, NV
NCAA tournament
March 17, 2022*; 11:45 a.m., TNT	(8 W) No. 23	vs. (9 W) Memphis; First Round	L 53–64	27–8	20 – Kigab	11 – Armus	2 – Tied	Moda Center; Portland, OR
*Non-conference game. ^{#}Rankings from AP Poll. (#) Tournament seedings in parentheses. W=West. All times are in Mountain Time.

== Rankings ==
Ranking movements Legend: ██ Increase in ranking ██ Decrease in ranking — = Not ranked RV = Received votes
	Week																			
Poll	Pre	1	2	3	4	5	6	7	8	9	10	11	12	13	14	15	16	17	18	Final
AP	—	—	—	—	—	—	—	—	—	—	—	RV	RV	RV	RV	RV	RV	RV	23	Not released
Coaches	RV	RV^	—	—	—	—	—	—	—	—	RV	RV	RV	RV	RV	RV	RV	RV	23	RV

*AP does not release post-NCAA tournament rankings.
^Coaches did not release a Week 1 poll.
