= 2021–22 Utah State Aggies men's basketball team =

American college basketball season

2021–22 Utah State Aggies men's basketball

Myrtle Beach Invitational champions

NIT, first round
- Conference: Mountain West Conference
- Record: 18–16 (8–10 MW)
- Head coach: Ryan Odom (1st season)
- Assistant coaches: Nate Dixon; Matt Henry; Bryce Crawford
- Home arena: Smith Spectrum

2021–22 Mountain West Conference men's basketball standings
	Conf.				Overall
Team	W		L	PCT	W		L	PCT
No. 23 Boise State †	15	–	3	.833	27	–	8	.771
No. 24 Colorado State	14	–	4	.778	25	–	6	.806
San Diego State	13	–	4	.765	23	–	9	.719
Wyoming	13	–	5	.722	25	–	9	.735
UNLV	10	–	8	.556	18	–	14	.563
Fresno State	8	–	9	.471	23	–	13	.639
Utah State	8	–	10	.444	18	–	16	.529
Nevada	6	–	12	.333	13	–	18	.419
New Mexico	5	–	12	.294	13	–	19	.406
Air Force	4	–	13	.235	11	–	18	.379
San Jose State	1	–	17	.056	8	–	23	.258
† Conference tournament winner Rankings from AP poll

The 2021–22 Utah State Aggies men's basketball team represented Utah State University in the 2021–22 NCAA Division I men's basketball season. The Aggies, led by first-year head coach Ryan Odom, played their home games at the Smith Spectrum in Logan, Utah as members of the Mountain West Conference.

== Previous season ==
In a season limited due to the ongoing COVID-19 pandemic, the Aggies finished the 2020–21 season 20–9, 15–4 in Mountain West play, to finish in second place. In the Mountain West tournament, they defeated UNLV and Colorado State before losing to San Diego State in the championship game. They received an at-large bid to the NCAA tournament as the No. 11 seed in the South region, where they lost to Texas Tech in the first round.

Following the season, head coach Craig Smith left the school to accept the head-coaching position at Utah. Shortly thereafter, the school named UMBC head coach Ryan Odom the team's new head coach.

== Offseason ==
=== Departures ===
Name	Number	Pos.	Height	Weight	Year	Hometown	Reason for departure
Alphonso Anderson	10	F	6' 6"	220	Senior	Tacoma, WA	Graduate transferred to Pacific
Liam McChesney	13	F	6' 10"	185	RS Freshman	Prince Rupert, BC	Transferred to Illinois State
Karson Stastny	21	G	6' 4"	175	Freshman	Celina, TX	Walk-on; transferred
Neemias Queta	23	C	7' 0"	245	Junior	Barreiro, Portugal	Declared for the 2021 NBA draft; selected 39th overall by the Sacramento Kings
Rollie Worster	24	G	6' 3"	200	Freshman	Missoula, MT	Transferred to Utah
Zahar Vedischev	30	G	6' 6"	180	Freshman	Moscow, Russia	Transferred
Marco Anthony	44	G	6' 5"	225	RS Junior	San Antonio, TX	Graduate transferred to Utah
Kuba Karwowski	52	C	7' 2"	220	Senior	Warsaw, Poland	Graduate transferred to Sam Houston State

=== Incoming transfers ===
Name	Number	Pos.	Height	Weight	Year	Hometown	Previous college
Travis Wagstaff	1	F	6' 7"	215	RS Sophomore	Holladay, UT	Junior college transferred from Snow College
Brandon Horvath	4	F	6' 10"	210	Graduate student	West River, MD	Transferred from UMBC. Will be eligible to play immediately since Horvath graduated from UMBC.
RJ Eytle-Rock	5	G	6' 4"	225	Senior	London, England	Transferred from UMBC
Rylan Jones	15	G	6' 0"	178	Junior	Salt Lake City, UT	Transferred from Utah

=== 2021 recruiting class ===
College recruiting
Name	Hometown	School	Height	Weight	Commit date
Muzamil Ameer Hamoda; SG	Riffa, Bahrain	Bridgton Academy	6 ft 6 in (1.98 m)	N/A	Mar 21, 2021
Muzamil Ameer Hamoda; SG	Recruit ratings: Rivals: 247Sports: (0)				
Overall recruit ranking: Scout: – Rivals: – 247Sports: #65
Note: In many cases, Scout, Rivals, 247Sports, On3, and ESPN may conflict in their listings of height and weight.; In these cases, the average was taken. ESPN grades are on a 100-point scale.; Sources: "2021 Team Ranking". Rivals.

== Roster ==
2021–22 Utah State Aggies men's basketball team
Players
Coaches

Pos.	#	Name	Height	Weight	Year	Previous school	Hometown
G	0	Landon Brenchley (W)	6 ft 4 in (1.93 m)	215 lb (98 kg)	Fr	Ridgeline HS	Providence, UT
F	1	Travis Wagstaff	6 ft 7 in (2.01 m)	215 lb (98 kg)	RS So	Olympus HS; Snow College	Salt Lake City, UT
G	2	Sean Bairstow	6 ft 8 in (2.03 m)	190 lb (86 kg)	Jr	Churchie	Brisbane, Australia
G	3	Steven Ashworth	6 ft 1 in (1.85 m)	170 lb (77 kg)	So	Lone Peak HS	Alpine, UT
F	4	Brandon Horvath	6 ft 10 in (2.08 m)	210 lb (95 kg)	GS	Southern; UMBC	West River, MD
G	5	RJ Eytle-Rock	6 ft 4 in (1.93 m)	225 lb (102 kg)	Sr	Barking Abbey School; UMBC	London, England
F	10	Cade Potter	6 ft 8 in (2.03 m)	230 lb (104 kg)	Fr	Orange Lutheran HS	Orange, CA
F	11	Max Shulga	6 ft 4 in (1.93 m)	197 lb (89 kg)	So	Basketball School of Excellence	Kyiv, Ukraine
C	12	Szymon Zapala	6 ft 11 in (2.11 m)	240 lb (109 kg)	So	SMS PZkosz Wladyslawowo	Zaborze, Poland
G	13	Conner Gillis (W)	6 ft 2 in (1.88 m)	150 lb (68 kg)	So	Gaston Christian HS	Charlotte, NC
G	14	Connor Odom (W)	5 ft 11 in (1.8 m)	165 lb (75 kg)	So	Archbishop Spalding HS	Annapolis, MD
G	15	Rylan Jones	6 ft 0 in (1.83 m)	178 lb (81 kg)	Jr	Olympus HS; Utah	Salt Lake City, UT
F	21	Norbert Thelissen (redshirt)	6 ft 7 in (2.01 m)	218 lb (99 kg)	So	Heroes Den Bosch	's-Hertogenbosch, Netherlands
G	22	Brock Miller	6 ft 5 in (1.96 m)	200 lb (91 kg)	RS Sr	Brighton HS	Sandy, UT
F	24	Zee Hamoda	6 ft 7 in (2.01 m)	170 lb (77 kg)	Fr	Bridgton Academy	Riffa, Bahrain
C	32	Trevin Dorius	7 ft 0 in (2.13 m)	240 lb (109 kg)	RS Jr	Wasatch HS	Heber City, UT
F	34	Justin Bean	6 ft 7 in (2.01 m)	210 lb (95 kg)	RS Sr	Southmoore HS	Moore, OK
F	35	Matthew Wickizer	6 ft 9 in (2.06 m)	210 lb (95 kg)	So	Kearns HS	North Salt Lake, UT

Head coach

- Ryan Odom (Hampden–Sydney)

Assistant coach(es)

- Nate Dixon (UNC Wilmington)
- Matt Henry (Trinity (TX))
- Bryce Crawford (Ohio State)

Legend

- (C) Team captain
- (S) Suspended
- (I) Ineligible
- (W) Walk-on
- Injured
- Current redshirt

Roster
Last update: January 12, 2025

== Schedule and results ==
Date time, TV	Rank^{#}	Opponent^{#}	Result	Record	High points	High rebounds	High assists	Site (attendance) city, state
Exhibition
October 27, 2021*; 7:00 p.m.		Montana Western	W 81–51		21 – Bean	10 – Bean	5 – tied	Smith Spectrum (6,390); Logan, UT
Non-conference regular season
November 9, 2021*; 7:30 p.m.		UC Davis	L 69–72	0–1	19 – Horvath	13 – Bean	6 – Jones	Smith Spectrum (6,554); Logan, UT
November 12, 2021*; 4:00 p.m., CBSSN		vs. Richmond; Veterans Classic	W 85–74	1–1	30 – Bean	14 – Bean	5 – Jones	Alumni Hall (3,800); Annapolis, MD
November 18, 2021*; 12:30 pm, ESPNU		vs. Penn; Myrtle Beach Invitational quarterfinals	W 87–79 ^{2OT}	2–1	33 – Bean	16 – Bean	5 – tied	HTC Center (1,156); Conway, SC
November 19, 2021*; 10:00 a.m., ESPN2		vs. New Mexico State; Myrtle Beach Invitational semifinals	W 85–58	3–1	19 – Jones	7 – Bean	4 – tied	HTC Center (1,131); Conway, SC
November 21, 2021*; 1:00 p.m., ESPN2		vs. Oklahoma; Myrtle Beach Invitational championship	W 73–70	4–1	24 – Bean	19 – Bean	5 – Jones	HTC Center (1,101); Conway, SC
November 27, 2021*; 7:00 p.m.		UT Arlington	W 80–61	5–1	24 – Bean	10 – Bean	7 – Jones	Smith Spectrum (8,088); Logan, UT
November 29, 2021*; 7:00 p.m.		Carroll (MT)	W 93–63	6–1	20 – Horvath	11 – Bean	7 – Jones	Smith Spectrum (7,524); Logan, UT
December 2, 2021*; 7:00 p.m., CBSSN		Saint Mary's	L 58–60	6–2	19 – Bean	10 – Bean	3 – Bean	Smith Spectrum (8,888); Logan, UT
December 8, 2021*; 7:00 p.m.		at No. 24 BYU; Old Oquirrh Bucket	L 71–82	6–3	20 – Bean	7 – tied	6 – Jones	Marriott Center (15,669); Provo, UT
December 11, 2021*; 7:00 p.m.		New Orleans	W 82–50	7–3	14 – Bean	9 – Dorius	11 – Jones	Smith Spectrum (8,727); Logan, UT
December 15, 2021*; 7:00 p.m., KJZZ		at Weber State; Old Oquirrh Bucket	W 95–80	8–3	27 – Ashworth	14 – Horvath	6 – Jones	Dee Events Center (6,355); Ogden, UT
December 18, 2021*; 7:00 p.m., BTN		vs. Iowa; Sanford Pentagon Showcase	L 75–94	8–4	18 – Horvath	6 – Horvath	5 – Jones	Sanford Pentagon (3,250); Sioux Falls, SD
December 21, 2021*; 7:00 p.m.		Portland State	W 81–62	9–4	29 – Bean	12 – Bean	8 – Jones	Smith Spectrum (6,945); Logan, UT
Mountain West regular season
December 28, 2021; 1:00 p.m.		at Air Force	L 47–49	9–5 (0–1)	18 – Bean	10 – tied	4 – Ashworth	Clune Arena (1,123); Colorado Springs, CO
January 8, 2022; 6:00 p.m., CBSSN		at New Mexico	W 90–87 ^{OT}	10–5 (1–1)	21 – Bean	11 – Bean	8 – Jones	The Pit (8,338); Albuquerque, NM
January 12, 2022; 6:00 p.m., CBSSN		at Colorado State	L 72–77	10–6 (1–2)	20 – Bairstow	7 – Horvath	4 – Horvath	Moby Arena (4,578); Fort Collins, CO
January 15, 2022; 7:00 p.m.		Wyoming	L 69–71	10–7 (1–3)	19 – tied	13 – Bean	3 – Bean	Smith Spectrum (8,109); Logan, UT
January 18, 2022; 9:00 p.m., CBSSN		at Fresno State	L 54–61	10–8 (1–4)	12 – Bairstow	6 – tied	5 – Bairstow	Save Mart Center (5,013); Fresno, CA
January 20, 2022; 7:00 p.m., Mountain West Network		Boise State; Rescheduled from January 4	L 59–62	10–9 (1–5)	14 – tied	12 – Bean	4 – Ashworth	Smith Spectrum (7,548); Logan, UT
January 26, 2022; 8:30 p.m., FS1		San Diego State	W 75–57	11–9 (2–5)	17 – Ashworth	13 – Bean	5 – Ashworth	Smith Spectrum (7,312); Logan, UT
January 29, 2022; 8:00 p.m., CBSSN		at Nevada	W 78–49	12–9 (3–5)	12 – Bean	7 – Horvath	7 – Ashworth	Lawlor Events Center (7,497); Reno, NV
February 1, 2022; 7:00 p.m., Stadium		Air Force	W 73–46	13–9 (4–5)	17 – Horvath	9 – Horvath	7 – Horvath	Smith Spectrum (7,545); Logan, UT
February 3, 2022; 7:00 p.m., MW Network		San Jose State; Rescheduled from January 1	W 78–62	14–9 (5–5)	19 – Horvath	11 – Horvath	5 – Horvath	Smith Spectrum (8,466); Logan, UT
February 5, 2022; 4:00 p.m., CBSSN		UNLV	W 90–75	15–9 (6–5)	32 – Bean	10 – Bean	7 – Ashworth	Smith Spectrum (9,029); Logan, UT
February 8, 2022; 7:00 p.m., Stadium		at Wyoming	L 76–78 ^{OT}	15–10 (6–6)	20 – Horvath	11 – Bean	6 – Horvath	Arena-Auditorium (5,558); Laramie, WY
February 11, 2022; 7:00 p.m., FS1		Nevada	L 72–85	15–11 (6–7)	29 – Horvath	9 – Bean	6 – Jones	Smith Spectrum (7,866); Logan, UT
February 15, 2022; 8:00 p.m., CBSSN		at San Diego State	L 56–75	15–12 (6–8)	18 – Bean	8 – Bean	5 – Jones	Viejas Arena (10,516); San Diego, CA
February 19, 2022; 4:00 p.m., CBSSN		at Boise State	L 57–68	15–13 (6–9)	16 – Eytle-Rock	7 – tied	3 – tied	ExtraMile Arena (10,252); Boise, ID
February 22, 2022; 8:00 p.m., FS1		New Mexico	W 81–56	16–13 (7–9)	21 – Bean	10 – Bean	6 – Ashworth	Smith Spectrum (7,102); Logan, UT
February 26, 2022; 8:30 p.m., FS1		Colorado State	L 55–66	16–14 (7–10)	14 – Eytle-Rock	11 – Bean	5 – Ashworth	Smith Spectrum (9,219); Logan, UT
March 4, 2022; 9:00 p.m., FS1		at San Jose State	W 75–52	17–14 (8–10)	18 – Bean	11 – Bean	5 – Jones	Provident Credit Union Event Center (2,005); San Jose, CA
Mountain West tournament
March 9, 2022; 2:30 p.m., Stadium	(7)	vs. (10) Air Force; First round	W 83–56	18–14	18 – Horvath	12 – Horvath	6 – Ashworth	Thomas & Mack Center; Paradise, NV
March 10, 2022; 7:00 p.m., CBSSN	(7)	vs. (2) No. 23 Colorado State; Quarterfinals	L 51–53	18–15	17 – Horvath	13 – Bean	5 – Jones	Thomas & Mack Center; Paradise, NV
NIT
March 15, 2022*; 7:00 p.m., ESPN	(4)	Oregon; First round – Texas A&M Bracket	L 72–83	18–16	20 – Ashworth	16 – Bean	5 – Ashworth	Smith Spectrum (7,023); Logan, UT
*Non-conference game. ^{#}Rankings from AP poll. (#) Tournament seedings in parentheses. All times are in Mountain.
