= 2021–22 New Mexico Lobos men's basketball team =

American college basketball season

2021–22 New Mexico Lobos men's basketball
- Conference: Mountain West Conference
- Record: 13–19 (5–12 MW)
- Head coach: Richard Pitino (1st season)
- Assistant coaches: Andy Hill; Isaac Chew; Eric Brown
- Home arena: The Pit

2021–22 Mountain West Conference men's basketball standings
	Conf.				Overall
Team	W		L	PCT	W		L	PCT
No. 23 Boise State †	15	–	3	.833	27	–	8	.771
No. 24 Colorado State	14	–	4	.778	25	–	6	.806
San Diego State	13	–	4	.765	23	–	9	.719
Wyoming	13	–	5	.722	25	–	9	.735
UNLV	10	–	8	.556	18	–	14	.563
Fresno State	8	–	9	.471	23	–	13	.639
Utah State	8	–	10	.444	18	–	16	.529
Nevada	6	–	12	.333	13	–	18	.419
New Mexico	5	–	12	.294	13	–	19	.406
Air Force	4	–	13	.235	11	–	18	.379
San Jose State	1	–	17	.056	8	–	23	.258
† Conference tournament winner Rankings from AP poll

The 2021–22 New Mexico Lobos men's basketball team represented the University of New Mexico during the 2021–22 NCAA Division I men's basketball season. The Lobos were led by first-year head coach Richard Pitino and played their home games at The Pit as members of the Mountain West Conference.

New Mexico finished 13–19, with a 5–12 record in Mountain West play, finishing ninth in the conference. They lost to Nevada in the first round of the Mountain West conference tournament.

== Previous season ==
In a season limited due to the ongoing COVID-19 pandemic, the Lobos finished the 2021–21 season 6–16, 2–15 in Mountain West play to finish in last place. In the Mountain West tournament, they lost in the first round to Fresno State.

Prior to the end of the season, the school announced that Paul Weir would not return as head coach. On March 16, 2021, the school named former Minnesota head coach Richard Pitino the team's new head coach.

== Offseason ==
=== Departures ===
Name	Number	Pos.	Height	Weight	Year	Hometown	Reason for departure
Isaiah Marin	0	G	6'5"	190	Freshman	Phoenix, AZ	Transferred to Indian Hills CC
Bayron Matos	1	F	6'9"	215	RS freshman	Santo Domingo, DR	Transferred to South Florida
Keith McGee	3	G	6'3"	180	RS senior	Rochester, NY	Graduate transferred to Morgan State
Rod Brown	5	F	6'8"	218	RS junior	Memphis, TN	Transferred to Jacksonville
Makuach Maluach	10	G/F	6'5"	190	Senior	Sydney, Australia	Graduated
Daniel Headdings	12	G	6'2"	185	RS freshman	Wasilla, AK	Transferred to Pima CC
Logan Padgett	14	F	6'7"	210	Sophomore	Homewood, AL	Transferred to Shelton State CC
Nolan Doresey	21	G	6'5"	185	Freshman	Knightdale, NC	Transferred to Holy Cross
Eloy Medina	23	G	6'3"	180	Freshman	Albuquerque, NM	Walk-on; transferred
Kurt Wegscheider	30	G	6'4"	185	Sophomore	Bangui, Central African Republic	Transferred
Assane Ndiaye	35	F	7'1"	240	Junior	Dakar, Senegal	Transferred

=== Incoming transfers ===
Name	Number	Pos.	Height	Weight	Year	Hometown	Previous school
KJ Jenkins	0	G	6'2"	165	Junior	Atlanta, GA	Junior college transferred from Kilgore College
Jamal Mashburn Jr.	5	G	6'2"	175	Sophomore	Miami, FL	Transferred from Minnesota
Jaelen House	10	G	6'1"	160	Junior	Phoenix, AZ	Transferred from Arizona State
Jay Allen-Tovar	21	F	6'9"	230	Junior	San Jose, CA	Junior college transferred from Salt Lake CC
Taryn Todd	24	G	6'5"	180	RS sophomore	Vaughan, ON	Transferred from TCU
Gethro Muscadin	35	C	6'10"	220	Sophomore	Gonaïves, Haiti	Transferred from Kansas

=== 2021 recruiting class ===
College recruiting
Name	Hometown	School	Height	Weight	Commit date
Sebastian Forsling; C	Gothenburg, Sweden	Rig Academy	6 ft 11 in (2.11 m)	235 lb (107 kg)	Apr 20, 2021
Sebastian Forsling; C	Recruit ratings: Scout: Rivals: 247Sports: ESPN: (0)				
Birima Seck; C	Glendale, AZ	Dream City Christian	6 ft 11 in (2.11 m)	205 lb (93 kg)	May 21, 2021
Birima Seck; C	Recruit ratings: Scout: Rivals: 247Sports: ESPN: (0)				
Overall recruit ranking:
Note: In many cases, Scout, Rivals, 247Sports, On3, and ESPN may conflict in their listings of height and weight.; In these cases, the average was taken. ESPN grades are on a 100-point scale.; Sources:

== Roster ==
2021–22 New Mexico Lobos men's basketball team
Players
Coaches

Pos.	#	Name	Height	Weight	Year	Previous school	Hometown
G	0	K. J. Jenkins	6 ft 2 in (1.88 m)	175 lb (79 kg)	RS Jr	Creekview HS; Kilgore College	Atlanta, GA
G	1	Saquan Singleton	6 ft 6 in (1.98 m)	190 lb (86 kg)	Sr	Monsignor Scanlan HS; Hutchinson CC	Bronx, NY
C	3	Sebastian Forsling	6 ft 11 in (2.11 m)	240 lb (109 kg)	Fr	RIG Mark	Floda, Sweden
G	4	Emmanuel Kuac	6 ft 7 in (2.01 m)	200 lb (91 kg)	Jr	Kearns HS	Calgary, AB
G	5	Jamal Mashburn Jr.	6 ft 2 in (1.88 m)	185 lb (84 kg)	So	Brewster Academy; Minnesota	Miami, FL
G	10	Jaelen House	6 ft 0 in (1.83 m)	155 lb (70 kg)	Jr	Shadow Mountain HS; Arizona State	Phoenix, AZ
G	13	Javanté Johnson	6 ft 6 in (1.98 m)	190 lb (86 kg)	So	Cheyenne Mountain HS	Colorado Springs, CO
G	20	Clay Patterson (W)	6 ft 1 in (1.85 m)	180 lb (82 kg)	RS Sr	Rio Rancho HS; Fort Lewis	Rio Rancho, NM
F	21	Jay Allen-Tovar	6 ft 9 in (2.06 m)	217 lb (98 kg)	Jr	Valley Christian School; Salt Lake CC	San Jose, CA
F	22	Valdir Manuel	6 ft 10 in (2.08 m)	225 lb (102 kg)	Sr	The Patrick School; Harcum College	Luanda, Angola
G	24	Taryn Todd	6 ft 5 in (1.96 m)	180 lb (82 kg)	RS So	Findlay Prep; TCU	Vaughn, ON
G	30	Jeremiah Francis III	6 ft 1 in (1.85 m)	205 lb (93 kg)	Jr	Pickerington Central HS; North Carolina	Columbus, OH
F	33	Jordan Arroyo (W)	6 ft 7 in (2.01 m)	210 lb (95 kg)	Sr	Atrisco Heritage Academy	Albuquerque, NM
F	34	Birima Seck	6 ft 11 in (2.11 m)	200 lb (91 kg)	Fr	Dream City Christian School	Glendale, AZ
F	35	Gethro Muscadin	6 ft 11 in (2.11 m)	230 lb (104 kg)	So	Kansas	Gonaïves, Haiti

Head coach

- Richard Pitino (Providence)

Assistant coach(es)

- Andy Hill (Eastern Washington)
- Isaac Chew (Avila)
- Eric Brown (Cal State Fullerton)

Legend

- (C) Team captain
- (S) Suspended
- (I) Ineligible
- (W) Walk-on
- Injured
- Current redshirt

Roster

== Schedule and results ==
Date time, TV	Rank^{#}	Opponent^{#}	Result	Record	High points	High rebounds	High assists	Site (attendance) city, state
Exhibition
November 5, 2021*; 7:00 p.m.		New Mexico Highlands	W 101–72		18 – Tied	11 – Johnson	8 – House	The Pit (7,182); Albuquerque, NM
Non-conference regular season
November 10, 2021*; 7:00 p.m.		Florida Atlantic	W 99–92	1–0	30 – House	8 – Allen-Tovar	6 – House	The Pit (8,553); Albuquerque, NM
November 13, 2021*; 4:30 p.m., P12N		at Colorado	L 76–87	1–1	22 – House	5 – Tied	4 – House	CU Events Center (7,115); Boulder, CO
November 15, 2021*; 7:00 p.m.		Grambling State	W 86–61	2–1	18 – Tied	10 – Johnson	7 – House	The Pit (8,010); Albuquerque, NM
November 20, 2021*; 2:00 p.m.		Montana State	W 81–78	3–1	21 – Mashburn, Jr.	10 – Muscadin	4 – Mashburn, Jr.	The Pit (9,084); Albuquerque, NM
November 22, 2021*; 7:00 p.m.		Western New Mexico	W 88–63	4–1	20 – Jenkins	10 – Seck	7 – Francis, III	The Pit (8,047); Albuquerque, NM
November 25, 2021*; 5:00 p.m., FS1		vs. UAB; Las Vegas Invitational Semifinals	L 73–86	4–2	26 – Mashburn, Jr.	5 – House	5 – House	Orleans Arena; Paradise, NV
November 26, 2021*; 7:00 p.m., FS2		vs. Towson; Las Vegas Invitational Consolation – 3rd Place	L 58–73	4–3	26 – Mashburn, Jr.	8 – Johnson	4 – House	Orleans Arena; Paradise, NV
November 30, 2021*; 7:00 p.m., ESPN+		at New Mexico State; Rio Grande Rivalry	W 101–94	5–3	31 – House	11 – Allen-Tovar	5 – House	Pan American Center; Las Cruces, NM
December 6, 2021*; 7:00 p.m.		New Mexico State; Rio Grande Rivalry	L 76-78 ^{OT}	5-4	26 – Mashburn Jr.	11 – Allen	3 – Mashburn Jr.	The Pit (13,019); Albuquerque, NM
December 9, 2021*; 7:00 p.m.		Denver	W 87-67	6-4	21 – Jenkins	11 – Muscadin	2 – Tied	The Pit (8,046); Albuquerque, NM
December 12, 2021*; 1:00 p.m., Stadium		UTEP; Rivalry	L 69–77	6–5	16 – Johnson	10 – Johnson	5 – Singleton	The Pit (9,044); Albuquerque, NM
December 19, 2021*; 1:00 p.m., Stadium		SMU	L 72–90	6–6	25 – Mashburn, Jr.	5 – Todd	7 – House	The Pit (8,394); Albuquerque, NM
December 21, 2021*; 1:00 p.m.		Norfolk State	W 68–54	7–6	16 – House	10 – Allen-Tovar	6 – House	The Pit (8,105); Albuquerque, NM
Mountain West regular season
January 1, 2022; 7:00 p.m., FS1		at Nevada	L 70–79	7–7 (0–1)	18 – House	9 – Kuac	6 – House	Lawlor Events Center (7,224); Reno, NV
January 8, 2022; 6:00 p.m., CBSSN		Utah State	L 87–90 ^{OT}	7–8 (0–2)	29 – Mashburn Jr.	6 – Tied	8 – Mashburn Jr.	The Pit (8,338); Albuquerque, NM
January 11, 2022; 9:00 p.m., CBSSN		at UNLV	L 56–85	7–9 (0–3)	26 – Jenkins	7 – House	3 – House	Thomas & Mack Center (3,860); Paradise, NV
January 15, 2022; 7:00 p.m., CBSSN		San Diego State; Rivalry	Canceled					The Pit; Albuquerque, NM
January 15, 2022; 3:30 p.m., FS1		Boise State; Moved from February 8	L 63–71	7–10 (0–4)	21 – House	8 – Forsling	7 – House	The Pit (8,279); Albuquerque, NM
January 19, 2022; 8:00 p.m., CBSSN		at Colorado State	L 74–80	7–11 (0–5)	18 – Johnson	5 – Jenkins	7 – House	Moby Arena (6,516); Fort Collins, CO
January 22, 2022; 5:30 p.m., CBSSN		at Wyoming	L 91–93	7–12 (0–6)	25 – Allen-Tovar	6 – Allen-Tovar	4 – Tied	Arena-Auditorium (5,368); Laramie, WY
January 25, 2022; 7:00 p.m., Stadium		Fresno State	L 60–65	7–13 (0–7)	19 – House	7 – Allen-Tovar	5 – House	The Pit (8,033); Albuquerque, NM
January 28, 2022; 7:00 p.m., Stadium		San José State	W 86–70	8–13 (1–7)	23 – Mashburn, Jr.	7 – Tied	13 – House	The Pit (8,277); Albuquerque, NM
January 31, 2022; 8:00 p.m., FS1		at San Diego State; Rivalry	L 47–72	8–14 (1–8)	16 – Jenkins	9 – Jenkins	3 – Mashburn, Jr.	Viejas Arena (10,951); San Diego, CA
February 5, 2022; 6:00 p.m., CBSSN		at Air Force	W 91–77	9–14 (2–8)	42 – House	9 – Allen-Tovar	2 – Tied	Clune Arena (2,723); Colorado Springs, CO
February 11, 2022*; 7:00 p.m., MWN		Northern New Mexico	W 78–46	10–14	21 – Mashburn, Jr.	5 – House	10 – Forsling	The Pit (8,214); Albuquerque, NM
February 15, 2022; 7:00 p.m., Stadium		No. 22 Wyoming	W 75–66	11–14 (3–8)	34 – House	8 – Allen-Tovar	6 – House	The Pit (8,208); Albuquerque, NM
February 17, 2022; 7:00 p.m., Mountain West Network		Colorado State; Originally scheduled for Dec. 28	L 68–83	11–15 (3–9)	17 – Tied	7 – Allen-Tovar	4 – Mashburn, Jr.	The Pit (8,404); Albuquerque, NM
February 19, 2022; 2:00 p.m., CBSSN		at San José State	L 55–71	11–16 (3–10)	17 – Mashburn, Jr.	5 – Jenkins	3 – Singleton	Provident Credit Union Event Center (1,682); San Jose, CA
February 22, 2022; 8:00 p.m., FS1		at Utah State	L 56–81	11–17 (3–11)	13 – Mashburn Jr.	6 – Allen-Tovar	3 – Mashburn Jr.	Smith Spectrum (7,102); Logan, UT
February 26, 2022; 2:00 p.m., Stadium		Air Force	W 69–65	12–17 (4–11)	24 – Mashburn, Jr.	12 – Allen-Tovar	2 – Tied	The Pit (9,089); Albuquerque, NM
February 28, 2022; 8:00 p.m., FS1		at Fresno State	L 68–71	12–18 (4–12)	27 – Mashburn, Jr.	9 – Johnson	4 – House	Save Mart Center; Fresno, CA
March 5, 2022; 9:00 p.m., FS1		UNLV	W 76–67	13–18 (5–12)	27 – House	7 – Arroyo	5 – House	The Pit (9,404); Albuquerque, NM
Mountain West tournament
March 9, 2022; 12:00 p.m., Stadium	(9)	vs. (8) Nevada; First Round	L 72–79	13–19	19 – House	7 – Singleton	7 – House	Thomas & Mack Center; Paradise, NV
*Non-conference game. ^{#}Rankings from AP Poll. (#) Tournament seedings in parentheses. All times are in Mountain Time.
