= 2021–22 San Jose State Spartans men's basketball team =

American college basketball season

2021–22 San Jose State Spartans men's basketball
- Conference: Mountain West Conference
- Record: 8–23 (1–17 MW)
- Head coach: Tim Miles (1st season)
- Assistant coaches: Ben Johnson; Damany Hendrix; David Miller
- Home arena: Provident Credit Union Event Center (Capacity: 5,000)

2021–22 Mountain West Conference men's basketball standings
	Conf.				Overall
Team	W		L	PCT	W		L	PCT
No. 23 Boise State †	15	–	3	.833	27	–	8	.771
No. 24 Colorado State	14	–	4	.778	25	–	6	.806
San Diego State	13	–	4	.765	23	–	9	.719
Wyoming	13	–	5	.722	25	–	9	.735
UNLV	10	–	8	.556	18	–	14	.563
Fresno State	8	–	9	.471	23	–	13	.639
Utah State	8	–	10	.444	18	–	16	.529
Nevada	6	–	12	.333	13	–	18	.419
New Mexico	5	–	12	.294	13	–	19	.406
Air Force	4	–	13	.235	11	–	18	.379
San Jose State	1	–	17	.056	8	–	23	.258
† Conference tournament winner Rankings from AP poll

The 2021–22 San Jose State Spartans men's basketball team represented San Jose State University in the 2021–22 NCAA Division I men's basketball season. They were led by first-year head coach Tim Miles and played their games at Provident Credit Union Event Center as members of the Mountain West Conference. They finished the season 8–23, 1–17 in MWC play to finish in last place. They lost to Fresno State in the first round of the MWC tournament.

== Previous season ==
In a season limited due to the ongoing COVID-19 pandemic, the Spartans finished the 2020–21 season 7–24, 3–15 in Mountain West play to finish in 10th place. They lost in the first round of the Mountain West tournament to New Mexico.

On March 12, 2021, the school fired head coach Jean Prioleau after four seasons with a 20–93 overall record. The school announced the hire of former Nebraska head coach Tim Miles as their next head coach on April 6.

== Offseason ==
=== Departures ===
Name	Number	Pos.	Height	Weight	Year	Hometown	Reason for departure
Jalen Dalcourt	2	G	6'2"	170	Junior	Lafayette, LA	Transferred to Louisiana
Hugo Clarkin	5	C	7'0"	215	Freshman	Las Flores, CA	Transferred
Richard Washington	11	G	6'6"	200	Senior	Newport News, VA	Graduated
Seneca Knight	13	G	6'7"	215	Junior	Lafayette, LA	Transferred to BYU
Kasion Hammonds	21	G	6'4"	180	Junior	Highlands Ranch, CO	No longer on team roster
Nate Lacewell	22	F	6'9"	195	Freshman	Missouri, TX	Transferred to Texas State
Ralph Agee	35	F	6'8"	220	Senior	Victorville, CA	Graduate transferred to Rutgers
Chase Courtney	40	F	6'10"	230	Freshman	Scottsdale, AZ	Transferred

=== Incoming transfers ===
Name	Number	Pos.	Height	Weight	Year	Hometown	Previous college
Shon Robinson	2	F	6'11"	220	RS Sophomore	Chicago, IL	Ole Miss
Ibrahima Diallo	5	C	6'10"	220	Junior	Saly, Senegal	Ohio State
Trey Anderson	15	F	6'6"	205	Junior	San Diego, CA	South Carolina
Majok Kuath	23	F	6'6"	185	Junior	Salt Lake City, UT	Hutchinson CC
Tibet Görener	31	F	6'9"	200	Sophomore	Istanbul, Turkey	Arizona
Josh O'Garro	42	G	6'5"	175	Sophomore	George Town, Cayman Islands	Oklahoma

=== 2021 recruiting class ===
College recruiting
Name	Hometown	School	Height	Weight	Commit date
Alvaro Cardenas; PG	Spain	Get Better Academy	6 ft 1 in (1.85 m)	N/A	Jun 2, 2021
Alvaro Cardenas; PG	Recruit ratings: Scout: Rivals: 247Sports: ESPN:				
Myron Amey; SG	Vacaville, CA	Scotland Campus Sports	6 ft 5 in (1.96 m)	N/A	Apr 20, 2021
Myron Amey; SG	Recruit ratings: Scout: Rivals: 247Sports: ESPN:				
Overall recruit ranking: Scout: – Rivals: –
Note: In many cases, Scout, Rivals, 247Sports, On3, and ESPN may conflict in their listings of height and weight.; In these cases, the average was taken. ESPN grades are on a 100-point scale.; Sources: "2021 San Jose State Basketball Recruiting Commits". Scout.; "Scout.com Team Recruiting Rankings". Scout.; "2021 Team Ranking". Rivals.

== Roster ==
2021–22 San Jose State Spartans men's basketball team
Players
Coaches

Pos.	#	Name	Height	Weight	Year	Previous school	Hometown
G	0	M. J. Amey Jr.	6 ft 5 in (1.96 m)	178 lb (81 kg)	Fr	Scotland Prep (Pa.)	Vacaville, California
G	1	Caleb Simmons	6 ft 6 in (1.98 m)	205 lb (93 kg)	RS Sr	Desert Vista HS	Vallejo, California
F	2	Shon Robinson	6 ft 9 in (2.06 m)	205 lb (93 kg)	RS So	Eduprize (Ariz.); Ole Miss	Chicago, Illinois
G	4	Sebastian Mendoza	6 ft 3 in (1.91 m)	195 lb (88 kg)	So	Hillcrest HS	Riverside, California
C	5	Ibrahima Diallo	7 ft 0 in (2.13 m)	220 lb (100 kg)	Jr	Prolific Prep; Ohio State	Saly, Senegal
F	10	Omari Moore	6 ft 6 in (1.98 m)	195 lb (88 kg)	Jr	Pasadena HS	Pasadena, California
G	12	Eduardo Lane	6 ft 11 in (2.11 m)	240 lb (109 kg)	RS Sr	Campinas HS; Marshalltown CC	Aquidauana, Brazil
G	13	Alvaro Cardenas Torre	6 ft 1 in (1.85 m)	180 lb (82 kg)	Fr	Get Better Academy	Granada, Spain
F	15	Trey Anderson	6 ft 7 in (2.01 m)	206 lb (93 kg)	Jr	Mater Dei Catholic; South Carolina	San Diego, California
F	23	Majok Kuath	6 ft 8 in (2.03 m)	183 lb (83 kg)	Jr	Kearns HS; Hutchinson CC	Salt Lake City, Utah
F	24	Michael Ofoegbu	6 ft 7 in (2.01 m)	205 lb (93 kg)	So	Mayfair HS	Lakewood, California
F	31	Tibet Görener	6 ft 9 in (2.06 m)	200 lb (91 kg)	So	Orange Lutheran HS (CA); Arizona	Istanbul, Turkey
G	42	Josh O'Garro	6 ft 6 in (1.98 m)	175 lb (79 kg)	So	Santa Clarita Christian School; Oklahoma	George Town, Cayman Islands
G	44	Trey Smith (W)	6 ft 3 in (1.91 m)	195 lb (88 kg)	Sr	Saddleback Valley Christian HS	Cypress, California
C	50	Harminder Dhaliwal (W)	6 ft 10 in (2.08 m)	235 lb (107 kg)	Jr	Aliso Niguel HS	Laguna Niguel, California

Head coach

- Tim Miles (Mary)

Assistant coach(es)

- Ben Johnson (Green Bay)
- Damany Hendrix (Lamar)
- David Miller (Arizona)

Legend

- (C) Team captain
- (S) Suspended
- (I) Ineligible
- (W) Walk-on
- Injured
- Current redshirt

Roster

== Schedule and results ==
Date time, TV	Rank^{#}	Opponent^{#}	Result	Record	Site (attendance) city, state
Exhibition
November 5, 2021*; 7:00 p.m.		Cal State East Bay	W 60–56		Provident Credit Union Event Center (1,343); San Jose, CA
Non-conference regular season
November 11, 2021*; 7:00 p.m.		Cal State Fullerton	W 78–76	1–0	Provident Credit Union Event Center (1,521); San Jose, CA
November 15, 2021*; 8:00 p.m., P12N		at Stanford	L 62–76	1–1	Maples Pavilion (2,492); Stanford, CA
November 18, 2021*; 7:00 p.m., ESPN+		at California Baptist; Abe Lemons Classic	L 66–67	1–2	CBU Events Center (3,004); Riverside, CA
November 20, 2021*; 12:00 p.m., LHN		at No. 8 Texas; Abe Lemons Classic	L 45–79	1–3	Frank Erwin Center (11,088); Austin, TX
November 23, 2021*; 7:00 p.m., MW Network		Northern Colorado; Abe Lemons Classic	W 75–74	2–3	Provident Credit Union Event Center (1,257); San Jose, CA
November 30, 2021*; 7:00 p.m., MW Network		South Dakota	W 61–52	3–3	Provident Credit Union Event Center (1,181); San Jose, CA
December 3, 2021*; 7:00 p.m., MW Network		North Dakota	W 76–51	4–3	Provident Credit Union Event Center (1,407); San Jose, CA
December 6, 2021*; 7:00 p.m., WCC Network		at Pepperdine	L 69–82	4–4	Firestone Fieldhouse (510); Malibu, CA
December 11, 2021*; 1:00 p.m., MW Network		Pacific	W 78–66	5–4	Provident Credit Union Event Center (1,546); San Jose, CA
December 17, 2021*; 7:00 p.m., WCC Network		at Portland	W 90–78	6–4	Chiles Center (982); Portland, OR
December 21, 2021*; 7:00 p.m., MW Network		Santa Clara	L 57–79	6–5	Provident Credit Union Event Center (1,761); San Jose, CA
January 8, 2022*; 3:30 p.m, MW Network		Bethesda	W 118–43	7–5	Provident Credit Union Event Center (1,082); San Jose, CA
Mountain West regular season
January 11, 2022; 7:00 p.m., MW Network		at Fresno State	L 59–79	7–6 (0–1)	Save Mart Center (2,579); Fresno, CA
January 15, 2022; 3:00 p.m., Stadium		Colorado State	L 42–78	7–7 (0–2)	Provident Credit Union Event Center (1,326); San Jose, CA
January 17, 2022; 6:00 p.m., CBSSN		UNLV; Rescheduled from January 5	L 56–81	7–8 (0–3)	Provident Credit Union Event Center (1,182); San Jose, CA
January 19, 2022; 6:00 p.m., MW Network		at Wyoming	L 69–84	7–9 (0–4)	Arena-Auditorium (4,371); Laramie, WY
January 22, 2022; 12:00 p.m., Stadium		at UNLV	L 62–70	7–10 (0–5)	Thomas & Mack Center (4,466); Paradise, NV
January 25, 2022; 7:00 p.m., NBCSCA		Air Force	L 53–63	7–11 (0–6)	Provident Credit Union Event Center (1,743); San Jose, CA
January 28, 2022; 6:00 p.m., MW Network		at New Mexico	L 70–86	7–12 (0–7)	The Pit (8,277); Albuquerque, NM
February 1, 2022; 8:00 p.m., CBSSN		Fresno State	L 43–73	7–13 (0–8)	Provident Credit Union Event Center (2,118); San Jose, CA
February 3, 2022; 6:00 p.m., MW Network		at Utah State; Rescheduled from January 1	L 62–78	7–14 (0–9)	Smith Spectrum (8,466); Logan, UT
February 5, 2022; 3:00 p.m., Stadium		at Boise State	L 60–76	7–15 (0–10)	ExtraMile Arena (10,456); Boise, ID
February 9, 2022; 8:00 p.m., CBSSN		San Diego State	L 62–72	7–16 (0–11)	Provident Credit Union Event Center (2,541); San Jose, CA
February 12, 2022; 6:00 p.m., Stadium		Wyoming	L 52–74	7–17 (0–12)	Provident Credit Union Event Center (2,251); San Jose, CA
February 15, 2022; 8:00 p.m., FS1		at Nevada	L 72–81	7–18 (0–13)	Lawlor Events Center (6,619); Reno, NV
February 17, 2022; 9:00 p.m., CBSSN		Nevada	L 60–90	7–19 (0–14)	Provident Credit Union Event Center (1,747); San Jose, CA
February 20, 2022; 1:00 p.m., CBSSN		New Mexico	W 71–55	8–19 (1–14)	Provident Credit Union Event Center (1,682); San Jose, CA
February 25, 2022; 8:00 p.m., FS1		San Diego State	L 52–77	8–20 (1–15)	Viejas Arena (12,071); San Diego, CA
March 1, 2022; 6:00 p.m., MW Network		at Air Force	L 54–58	8–21 (1–16)	Clune Arena (1,275); Colorado Springs, CO
March 4, 2022; 8:00 p.m., FS1		Utah State	L 52–75	8–22 (1–17)	Provident Credit Union Event Center (2,005); San Jose, CA
Mountain West tournament
March 9, 2022; 4:00 p.m., Stadium	(11)	vs. (6) Fresno State; First Round	L 67–69 ^{OT}	8–23	Thomas & Mack Center; Paradise, NV
*Non-conference game. ^{#}Rankings from AP Poll. (#) Tournament seedings in parentheses. All times are in Pacific Time.
