= 2022 Mountain West Conference men's basketball tournament =

- Classification: Division I
- Season: 2021–22
- Teams: 11
- Site: Thomas & Mack Center; Paradise, Nevada
- Champions: Boise State (1st title)
- Winning coach: Leon Rice (1st title)
- MVP: Abu Kigab (Boise State)
- Television: Stadium/MWN, CBSSN, CBS/Paramount+

2021–22 Mountain West Conference men's basketball standings
	Conf.				Overall
Team	W		L	PCT	W		L	PCT
No. 23 Boise State †	15	–	3	.833	27	–	8	.771
No. 24 Colorado State	14	–	4	.778	25	–	6	.806
San Diego State	13	–	4	.765	23	–	9	.719
Wyoming	13	–	5	.722	25	–	9	.735
UNLV	10	–	8	.556	18	–	14	.563
Fresno State	8	–	9	.471	23	–	13	.639
Utah State	8	–	10	.444	18	–	16	.529
Nevada	6	–	12	.333	13	–	18	.419
New Mexico	5	–	12	.294	13	–	19	.406
Air Force	4	–	13	.235	11	–	18	.379
San Jose State	1	–	17	.056	8	–	23	.258
† Conference tournament winner Rankings from AP poll

The 2022 Mountain West Conference men's basketball tournament was the postseason men's basketball tournament for the Mountain West Conference. It was held March 9–12, 2022, at the Thomas & Mack Center on the campus of University of Nevada, Las Vegas, in Paradise, Nevada. The tournament champion, the Boise State Broncos, received the conference's automatic bid to the NCAA tournament.

== Seeds ==
The defending champions from the prior season were the San Diego State Aztecs.

All 11 Mountain West schools participated in the tournament. Teams were seeded by conference record with a tiebreaker system to seed teams with identical percentages. The top five teams received byes into the tournament quarterfinals. The remaining teams played in the first round. Tie-breaking procedures remained unchanged since the 2020 tournament.

- Head-to-head record between the tied teams
- Record against the highest-seeded team not involved in the tie, going down through the seedings as necessary
- Higher NET

Seed	School	Conf	Tiebreaker(s)
1	Boise State	15–3	
2	Colorado State	14–4	
3	San Diego State	13–4	
4	Wyoming	13–5	
5	UNLV	10–8	
6	Fresno State	8–9	
7	Utah State	8–10	
8	Nevada	6–12	
9	New Mexico	5–12	
10	Air Force	4–13	
11	San José State	1–17	

== Schedule ==
Game	Time	Matchup	Score	Television	Attendance
First round – Wednesday, March 9
1	11:00 am	No. 8 Nevada vs. No. 9 New Mexico	79–72	Stadium	
2	1:30 pm	No. 7 Utah State vs. No. 10 Air Force	83–56	Stadium	
3	4:00 pm	No. 6 Fresno State vs. No. 11 San José State	69–67 (OT)	Stadium	
Quarterfinals – Thursday, March 10
4	12:00 pm	No. 1 Boise State vs. No. 8 Nevada	71–69	CBSSN	
5	2:30 pm	No. 4 Wyoming vs. No. 5 UNLV	59–56	CBSSN	
6	6:00 pm	No. 2 Colorado State vs. No. 7 Utah State	53−51	CBSSN	
7	8:30 pm	No. 3 San Diego State vs. No. 6 Fresno State	53−46	CBSSN	
Semifinals – Friday, March 11
8	6:30 pm	No. 1 Boise State vs. No. 4 Wyoming	68−61	CBSSN	
9	9:00 pm	No. 2 Colorado State vs. No. 3 San Diego State	58−63	CBSSN	
Championship – Saturday, March 12
10	3:00 pm	No. 1 Boise State vs. No. 3 San Diego State	53–52	CBS/Paramount+	
Game times in PT. Rankings denote tournament seeding.

== Bracket ==
First round Wednesday, March 9 Stadium/MWN
8	Nevada	79
9	New Mexico	72
7	Utah State	83
10	Air Force	56
6	Fresno State	69*
11	San José State	67

Quarterfinals; Thursday, March 10; CBSSN
1	Boise State	71
8	Nevada	69
4	Wyoming	59
5	UNLV	56
2	Colorado State	53
7	Utah State	51
3	San Diego State	53
6	Fresno State	46

Semifinals; Friday, March 11; CBSSN
1	Boise State	68
4	Wyoming	61
2	Colorado State	58
3	San Diego State	63

Championship; Saturday, March 12; CBS/Paramount+
1	Boise State	53
3	San Diego State	52

* denotes overtime period
