= 2021–22 Nevada Wolf Pack men's basketball team =

American college basketball season

2021–22 Nevada Wolf Pack men's basketball

Crossover Classic Champions
- Conference: Mountain West Conference
- Record: 13–18 (6–12 MW)
- Head coach: Steve Alford (3rd season)
- Associate head coach: Craig Neal
- Assistant coaches: Kory Barnett; Bill Duany
- Home arena: Lawlor Events Center

2021–22 Mountain West Conference men's basketball standings
	Conf.				Overall
Team	W		L	PCT	W		L	PCT
No. 23 Boise State †	15	–	3	.833	27	–	8	.771
No. 24 Colorado State	14	–	4	.778	25	–	6	.806
San Diego State	13	–	4	.765	23	–	9	.719
Wyoming	13	–	5	.722	25	–	9	.735
UNLV	10	–	8	.556	18	–	14	.563
Fresno State	8	–	9	.471	23	–	13	.639
Utah State	8	–	10	.444	18	–	16	.529
Nevada	6	–	12	.333	13	–	18	.419
New Mexico	5	–	12	.294	13	–	19	.406
Air Force	4	–	13	.235	11	–	18	.379
San Jose State	1	–	17	.056	8	–	23	.258
† Conference tournament winner Rankings from AP poll

The 2021–22 Nevada Wolf Pack men's basketball team represented the University of Nevada, Reno during the 2021–22 NCAA Division I men's basketball season. The Wolf Pack, led by third-year head coach Steve Alford, played their home games at the Lawlor Events Center in Reno, Nevada as members of the Mountain West Conference.

== Previous season ==
In a season limited due to the ongoing COVID-19 pandemic, the Wolf Pack finished the 2020–21 season 16–10, 10–7 in Mountain West play to finish in fifth place. They defeated Boise State in the quarterfinals of the Mountain West tournament before losing in the semifinals to San Diego State.

== Offseason ==
=== Departures ===
Name	Number	Pos.	Height	Weight	Year	Hometown	Reason for departure
Robby Robinson	1	F	6'8"	225	RS Junior	San Diego, CA	Transferred to New Orleans
Addison Patterson	2	G	6'6"	195	Sophomore	Milton, ON	Left the team for personal reasons
Gabe Bansulo	10	G	6'1"	165	Sophomore	Reno, NV	No longer on team roster
Kane Milling	11	G	6'4"	180	Sophomore	Nantes, France	Transferred to UC Davis
Khristion Courseault	13	G	6'2"	180	RS Sophomore	Los Angeles, CA	Walk-on; transferred
Zane Meeks	15	F	6'9"	215	Sophomore	Prairie Village, KS	Transferred to San Francisco
Zachary Williams	44	F	6'7"	205	Senior	Reno, NV	Walk-on; graduated

=== Incoming transfers ===
Name	Number	Pos.	Height	Weight	Year	Hometown	Previous school
Kenan Blackshear	1	G	6'6"	215	Junior	Orlando, FL	Florida Atlantic
AJ Bramah	2	G/F	6'7"	210	Senior	San Leandro, CA	Robert Morris

=== 2021 recruiting class ===
College recruiting information
Name	Hometown	School	Height	Weight	Commit date
Nick Davidson #42 PF	Mission Viejo, CA	Mater Dei High School	6 ft 8 in (2.03 m)	210 lb (95 kg)	Sep 9, 2020
Nick Davidson #42 PF	Recruit ratings: Scout: Rivals: 247Sports: (77)				
Jalen Weaver #45 SF	Aurora, CO	Southern California Academy	6 ft 4 in (1.93 m)	185 lb (84 kg)	Sep 19, 2020
Jalen Weaver #45 SF	Recruit ratings: Scout: Rivals: 247Sports: (76)				
Overall recruit ranking: Scout: – Rivals: –
Note: In many cases, Scout, Rivals, 247Sports, On3, and ESPN may conflict in their listings of height and weight.; In these cases, the average was taken. ESPN grades are on a 100-point scale.; Sources: "2021 Team Ranking". Rivals.

== Roster ==
2021–22 Nevada Wolf Pack men's basketball team
Players
Coaches

Pos.	#	Name	Height	Weight	Year	Previous school	Hometown
G	0	Jalen Weaver	6 ft 4 in (1.93 m)	185 lb (84 kg)	Fr	Southern California Academy	Aurora, CO
G/F	2	AJ Bramah	6 ft 7 in (2.01 m)	210 lb (95 kg)	Sr	San Leandro HS; Robert Morris	San Leandro, CA
G	1	Kenan Blackshear	6 ft 6 in (1.98 m)	215 lb (98 kg)	Jr	Jones HS; Florida Atlantic	Orlando, FL
G	3	Alem Huseinovic	6 ft 4 in (1.93 m)	190 lb (86 kg)	So	PHHoenix Prep	Zenica, Bosnia and Herzegovina
G	4	Desmond Cambridge Jr.	6 ft 4 in (1.93 m)	180 lb (82 kg)	RS Sr	The Hun School; Brown	Nashville, TN
F	5	Warren Washington	7 ft 0 in (2.13 m)	215 lb (98 kg)	RS Jr	Mission Hills HS; Oregon State	San Marcos, CA
F	11	Nick Davidson	6 ft 8 in (2.03 m)	210 lb (95 kg)	Fr	Mater Dei HS	Santa Ana, CA
F	14	Tré Coleman	6 ft 7 in (2.01 m)	185 lb (84 kg)	So	Jeffersonville HS	Jeffersonville, IN
G	20	Daniel Foster	6 ft 6 in (1.98 m)	185 lb (84 kg)	So	Golden State Prep	Melbourne, Australia
G	21	Jason Mensah (W)	5 ft 11 in (1.8 m)	—	Fr	Green Valley HS	Henderson, NV
F	23	DeAndre Henry	6 ft 7 in (2.01 m)	225 lb (102 kg)	So	PHHoenix Prep	Phoenix, AZ
G	25	Grant Sherfield	6 ft 2 in (1.88 m)	189 lb (86 kg)	Jr	Sunrise Christian Academy; Wichita State	Fort Worth, TX
F	30	Caleb Oden (W)	6 ft 5 in (1.96 m)	170 lb (77 kg)	Fr	Dublin HS	Dublin, CA
F	42	K. J. Hymes Jr.	6 ft 10 in (2.08 m)	210 lb (95 kg)	RS Jr	Hillcrest Prep	Phoenix, AZ
C	50	Will Baker	7 ft 0 in (2.13 m)	245 lb (111 kg)	Jr	Westlake HS; Texas	Austin, TX

Head coach

- Steve Alford (Indiana)

Assistant coach(es)

- Craig Neal (Georgia Tech)
- Kory Barnett (Indiana)
- Bill Duany (Indiana)

Legend

- (C) Team captain
- (S) Suspended
- (I) Ineligible
- (W) Walk-on
- Injured
- Current redshirt

Roster

== Schedule and results ==
Date time, TV	Rank^{#}	Opponent^{#}	Result	Record	High points	High rebounds	High assists	Site (attendance) city, state
Exhibition
November 1, 2021*; 7:00 p.m.		Dominican						Lawlor Events Center; Reno, NV
Non-conference regular season
November 9, 2021*; 7:00 p.m.		Eastern Washington	W 91–76	1–0	22 – Cambridge	9 – Bramah	9 – Sherfield	Lawlor Events Center (7,103); Reno, NV
November 12, 2021*; 7:00 p.m.		San Diego	L 68–75	1–1	18 – Washington	10 – Washington	5 – Blackshear	Lawlor Events Center (7,370); Reno, NV
November 16, 2021*; 6:00 p.m.		at Santa Clara	L 74–96	1–2	23 – Sherfield	6 – Tied	6 – Sherfield	Leavey Center (1,002); Santa Clara, CA
November 18, 2021*; 7:30 p.m., Stadium		at San Francisco	L 70–73	1–3	24 – Baker	7 – Bramah	7 – Sherfield	War Memorial Gymnasium (1,690); San Francisco, CA
November 22, 2021*; 4:00 p.m., ESPN+		vs. South Dakota State; Crossover Classic	L 75–102	1–4	20 – Washington	6 – Washington	5 – Sherfield	Sanford Pentagon (1,643); Sioux Falls, SD
November 23, 2021*; 4:00 p.m., ESPN+		vs. George Mason; Crossover Classic	W 88–69	2–4	31 – Sherfield	6 – Sherfield	6 – Sherfield	Sanford Pentagon (1,600); Sioux Falls, SD
November 24, 2021*; 4:00 p.m., ESPN+		vs. Washington; Crossover Classic	W 81–62	3–4	23 – Sherfield	9 – Tied	5 – Sherfield	Sanford Pentagon (1,239); Sioux Falls, SD
November 30, 2021*; 7:00 p.m.		Pepperdine	W 79–66	4–4	24 – Sherfield	8 – Tied	10 – Sherfield	Lawlor Events Center (6,416); Reno, NV
December 4, 2021*; 1:00 p.m., Stadium		at North Texas	Canceled due to COVID-19 protocols at Nevada					The Super Pit; Denton, TX
December 7, 2021*; 5:00 p.m., ESPN+		at UT Arlington	Canceled due to COVID-19 protocols at Nevada					College Park Center; Arlington, TX
December 15, 2021*; 7:00 p.m.		Minnesota Duluth	W 98–62	5–4	28 – Sherfield	12 – Sherfield	9 – Sherfield	Lawlor Events Center (6,568); Reno, NV
December 18, 2021*; 8:00 p.m., CBSSN		Loyola Marymount	W 68–63	6–4	24 – Sherfield	8 – Washington	4 – Sherfield	Lawlor Events Center (6,689); Reno, NV
December 21, 2021*; 7:00 p.m.		Grand Canyon	Cancelled due to COVID-19 protocols at Grand Canyon					Lawlor Events Center; Reno, NV
December 29, 2021*; 5:00 pm, ESPN+		at No. 6 Kansas	L 61–88	6–5	16 – Tied	6 – Washington	4 – Tied	Allen Fieldhouse (16,300); Lawrence, KS
Mountain West regular season
January 1, 2022; 6:00 p.m., FS1		New Mexico	W 79–70	7–5 (1–0)	18 – Cambridge, Jr.	11 – Tied	10 – Sherfield	Lawlor Events Center (7,224); Reno, NV
January 12, 2022; 7:30 p.m., FS1		Boise State	L 70–85	7–6 (1–1)	26 – Sherfield	7 – Cambridge, Jr.	7 – Sherfield	Lawlor Events Center (6,386); Reno, NV
January 15, 2022; 2:00 p.m., CBSSN		at Air Force	W 75–68	8–6 (2–1)	21 – Sherfield	10 – Baker	5 – Foster	Clune Arena (1,013); Colorado Springs, CO
January 17, 2022; 5:00 p.m., FS1		Wyoming; Rescheduled from January 4	L 67–77	8–7 (2–2)	20 – Sherfield	9 – Cambridge, Jr.	8 – Sherfield	Lawlor Events Center (6,369); Reno, NV
January 21, 2022; 8:00 p.m., FS1		Fresno State	W 77–73	9–7 (3–2)	17 – Sherfield	6 – Foster	7 – Sherfield	Lawlor Events Center (6,944); Reno, NV
January 25, 2022; 6:00 p.m., FS1		at Colorado State	L 66–77	9–8 (3–3)	23 – Cambridge Jr.	9 – Baker	3 – Sherfield	Moby Arena (5,675); Fort Collins, CO
January 29, 2022; 7:00 p.m., CBSSN		Utah State	L 49–78	9–9 (3–4)	12 – Cambridge, Jr.	7 – Cambridge, Jr.	5 – Sherfield	Lawlor Events Center (7,497); Reno, NV
February 1, 2022; 7:30 p.m., FS1		at UNLV; Battle for Nevada	L 58–69	9–10 (3–5)	17 – Blackshear	7 – Cambridge, Jr.	4 – Foster	Thomas & Mack Center (6,670); Paradise, NV
February 4, 2022; 8:00 p.m., FS1		at Fresno State	L 56–73	9–11 (3–6)	16 – Cambridge, Jr.	10 – Cambridge, Jr.	4 – Cambridge, Jr.	Save Mart Center (5,897); Fresno, CA
February 6, 2022; 1:00 p.m., CBSSN		at San Diego State	L 63–65	9–12 (3–7)	18 – Cambridge, Jr.	8 – Tied	6 – Blackshear	Viejas Arena (10,330); San Diego, CA
February 8, 2022; 9:00 p.m., CBSSN		Colorado State	L 72–82	9–13 (3–8)	36 – Cambridge, Jr.	4 – Tied	7 – Sherfield	Lawlor Events Center (6,279); Reno, NV
February 11, 2022; 6:00 p.m., FS1		at Utah State	W 85–72	10–13 (4–8)	27 – Cambridge, Jr.	9 – Tied	8 – Blackshear	Smith Spectrum (7,866); Logan, UT
February 15, 2022; 8:00 p.m., FS1		San José State	W 81–72	11–13 (5–8)	23 – Baker	7 – Cambridge	8 – Sherfield	Lawlor Events Center (6,619); Reno, NV
February 17, 2022; 9:00 p.m., CBSSN		at San José State	W 90–60	12–13 (6–8)	25 – Sherfield	7 – Blackshear	10 – Sherfield	Provident Credit Union Event Center (1,747); San Jose, CA
February 22, 2022; 6:00 p.m., CBSSN		UNLV; Battle for Nevada	L 54–62	12–14 (6–9)	19 – Sherfield	11 – Washington	8 – Sherfield	Lawlor Events Center (9,148); Reno, NV
February 26, 2022; 7:00 p.m., CBSSN		at Wyoming	L 61–74	12–15 (6–10)	12 – Tied	7 – Foster	5 – Sherfield	Arena-Auditorium (7,855); Laramie, WY
March 1, 2022; 6:00 p.m., FS2		at Boise State	L 67–73	12–16 (6–11)	16 – Blackshear	5 – Foster	6 – Sherfield	ExtraMile Arena (11,954); Boise, ID
March 5, 2022; 8:30 p.m., CBSSN		San Diego State	L 78–79	12–17 (6–12)	30 – Sherfield	10 – Washington	7 – Sherfield	Lawlor Events Center (8,173); Reno, NV
Mountain West tournament
March 9, 2022; 11:00 a.m., Stadium	(8)	vs. (9) New Mexico; First Round	W 79–72	13–17	27 – Sherfield	10 – Sherfield	5 – Sherfield	Thomas & Mack Center; Paradise, NV
March 10, 2022; 12:00 p.m., CBSSN	(8)	vs. (1) Boise State; Quarterfinals	L 69–71	13–18	25 – Sherfield	6 – Cambridge, Jr.	6 – Sherfield	Thomas & Mack Center; Paradise, NV
*Non-conference game. (#) Tournament seedings in parentheses. All times are in Pacific Time.
