= 2021–22 San Diego State Aztecs men's basketball team =

American college basketball season

2021–22 San Diego State Aztecs men's basketball

NCAA tournament, first round
- Conference: Mountain West Conference
- Record: 23–9 (13–4 MW)
- Head coach: Brian Dutcher (5th season)
- Assistant coaches: Dave Velasquez; Chris Acker; JayDee Luster
- Offensive scheme: Wheel
- Base defense: Pack-Line
- Home arena: Viejas Arena (Capacity: 12,414)

2021–22 Mountain West Conference men's basketball standings
	Conf.				Overall
Team	W		L	PCT	W		L	PCT
No. 23 Boise State †	15	–	3	.833	27	–	8	.771
No. 24 Colorado State	14	–	4	.778	25	–	6	.806
San Diego State	13	–	4	.765	23	–	9	.719
Wyoming	13	–	5	.722	25	–	9	.735
UNLV	10	–	8	.556	18	–	14	.563
Fresno State	8	–	9	.471	23	–	13	.639
Utah State	8	–	10	.444	18	–	16	.529
Nevada	6	–	12	.333	13	–	18	.419
New Mexico	5	–	12	.294	13	–	19	.406
Air Force	4	–	13	.235	11	–	18	.379
San Jose State	1	–	17	.056	8	–	23	.258
† Conference tournament winner Rankings from AP poll

The 2021–22 San Diego State Aztecs men's basketball team represented San Diego State University during the 2021–22 NCAA Division I men's basketball season. The Aztecs, led by fifth-year head coach Brian Dutcher, played their home games at Viejas Arena as members in the Mountain West Conference. They finished the season 23–9, 13–4 in Mountain West Play to finish in third place. As the No. 3 seed in the Mountain West tournament, they defeated Fresno State and Colorado State to advance to the championship game, where they lost to Boise State. They received an at-large bid to the NCAA tournament as the No. 8 seed in the Midwest Region, where they lost in the first round to Creighton.

== Previous season ==
In a season limited due to the ongoing COVID-19 pandemic, the Aztecs finished the 2020–21 season 23–5, 14–3 in Mountain West play to win the regular season championship. In the Mountain West tournament, they defeated Wyoming, Nevada, and Utah State to win the tournament championship. As a result, they received the conference's automatic bid to the NCAA tournament as the No. 6 seed in the Midwest region. There they lost in the first round to Syracuse.

== Offseason ==
=== Departures ===
Name	Number	Pos.	Height	Weight	Year	Hometown	Reason for departure
Terrell Gomez	3	G	5'8"	165	Senior	Los Angeles, CA	Graduated
Matt Mitchell	11	F	6'6"	235	Senior	Riverside, CA	Graduated
Jordan Schakel	20	G	6'6"	200	Senior	Torrance, CA	Graduated

=== Incoming transfers ===
Name	Number	Pos.	Height	Weight	Year	Hometown	Previous college
Matt Bradley	3	G	6'4"	220	Senior	San Bernardino, CA	California
Jaedon LeDee	13	F	6'9"	240	Senior	Houston, TX	TCU
Chad Baker-Mazara	20	F	6'7"	190	Sophomore	Santo Domingo, DR	Duquesne
Tahirou Diabate	22	F	6'9"	225	RS Senior	Bamako, Mali	Portland

=== 2021 recruiting class ===
College recruiting information
Name	Hometown	School	Height	Weight	Commit date
Demarshay Johnson, Jr. C	Richmond, CA	Salesian High School	6 ft 10 in (2.08 m)	215 lb (98 kg)	Nov 10, 2020
Demarshay Johnson, Jr. C	Recruit ratings: Scout: Rivals: 247Sports: ESPN: (NR)				
Overall recruit ranking:
Note: In many cases, Scout, Rivals, 247Sports, On3, and ESPN may conflict in their listings of height and weight.; In these cases, the average was taken. ESPN grades are on a 100-point scale.; Sources: "2021 San Diego St. Basketball Commitment List". Rivals.; "2020 San Diego St. Player Commits". ESPN.; "2021 Team Ranking". Rivals.

== Roster ==
2021–22 San Diego State Aztecs men's basketball team
Players
Coaches

Pos.	#	Name	Height	Weight	Year	Previous school	Hometown
F	0	Keshad Johnson	6 ft 7 in (2.01 m)	210 lb (95 kg)	Jr	San Leandro HS	Oakland, California
G	2	Adam Seiko	6 ft 3 in (1.91 m)	210 lb (95 kg)	RS Sr	Sierra Canyon HS	Boston, Massachusetts
G	3	Matt Bradley	6 ft 4 in (1.93 m)	220 lb (100 kg)	Sr	Wasatch Academy; California	San Bernardino, California
G	4	Trey Pulliam	6 ft 3 in (1.91 m)	180 lb (82 kg)	RS Sr	A&M Consolidated HS; Navarro College	Bryan, Texas
G	5	Lamont Butler	6 ft 0 in (1.83 m)	200 lb (91 kg)	So	Riverside Poly HS	Moreno Valley, California
G	10	Keith Dinwiddie Jr.	6 ft 0 in (1.83 m)	185 lb (84 kg)	So	Fairfax HS	Los Angeles, California
F	11	Demarshay Johnson Jr. (redshirt)	6 ft 9 in (2.06 m)	210 lb (95 kg)	Fr	Salesian College Prep	Richmond, California
F	13	Jaedon LeDee (redshirt)	6 ft 9 in (2.06 m)	240 lb (109 kg)	Jr	The Kinkaid School; TCU	Houston, Texas
F	14	Cade Alger (W)	6 ft 9 in (2.06 m)	190 lb (86 kg)	RS So	Ripon Christian HS; Seattle	Ripon, California
F	20	Chad Baker-Mazara	6 ft 7 in (2.01 m)	190 lb (86 kg)	So	SPIRE Institute; Duquesne	Santo Domingo, DR
G	21	Jared Barnett (W)	6 ft 1 in (1.85 m)	145 lb (66 kg)	Jr	Westchester HS	Los Angeles, California
F	22	Tahirou Diabate	6 ft 9 in (2.06 m)	225 lb (102 kg)	RS Sr	Teikyo Nagaoka HS; Portland	Bamako, Mali
F	23	Joshua Tomaić	6 ft 9 in (2.06 m)	230 lb (104 kg)	RS Sr	Canarias Basketball Academy; Maryland	Lanzarote, Spain
G	24	Tyler Broughton (W)	6 ft 4 in (1.93 m)	190 lb (86 kg)	So	Tesoro HS	Ladera Ranch, California
G	25	Max Wilson (W) (redshirt)	6 ft 6 in (1.98 m)	190 lb (86 kg)	Fr	Oakton HS	Reston, Virginia
F	31	Nathan Mensah	6 ft 10 in (2.08 m)	230 lb (104 kg)	Sr	Findlay Prep	Accra, Ghana
F	33	Aguek Arop	6 ft 6 in (1.98 m)	220 lb (100 kg)	Sr	Omaha South HS	Omaha, Nebraska
G	42	Triston Broughton (W)	6 ft 4 in (1.93 m)	190 lb (86 kg)	So	Tesoro HS	Ladera Ranch, California

Head coach

- Brian Dutcher (Minnesota)

Assistant coach(es)

- Dave Velasquez (San Diego State)
- Chris Acker (Chaminade)
- JayDee Luster (Wyoming)

Legend

- (C) Team captain
- (S) Suspended
- (I) Ineligible
- (W) Walk-on
- Injured
- Current redshirt

Roster

== Schedule and results ==
Date time, TV	Rank^{#}	Opponent^{#}	Result	Record	High points	High rebounds	High assists	Site (attendance) city, state
Exhibition
November 3, 2021*; 7:00 p.m.		Saint Katherine	W 65–44		15 – Bradley	11 – Mensah	3 – Seiko	Viejas Arena (10,464); San Diego, CA
Non-conference regular season
November 9, 2021*; 7:00 p.m., YurView		UC Riverside	W 66–53	1–0	23 – Bradley	10 – Mensah	2 – Mensah	Viejas Arena (11,729); San Diego, CA
November 12, 2021*; 6:00 p.m., BYUtv		at BYU; Rivalry	L 60–66	1–1	18 – Mensah	8 – Mensah	4 – Pulliam	Marriott Center (16,470); Provo, UT
November 18, 2021*; 7:30 p.m., CBSSN		Arizona State	W 65–63	2–1	14 – Butler	9 – Mensah	4 – Pulliam	Viejas Arena (12,414); San Diego, CA
November 20, 2021*; 7:00 p.m., YurView		UT Arlington	W 68–62	3–1	15 – Bradley	6 – Bradley	3 – Bradley	Viejas Arena (11,903); San Diego, CA
November 25, 2021*; 9:00 p.m., ESPN2		vs. Georgetown; Wooden Legacy Semifinals	W 73–56	4–1	18 – Bradley	7 – Bradley	8 – Pulliam	Anaheim Convention Center (1,402); Anaheim, CA
November 26, 2021*; 8:30 p.m., ESPN2		vs. No. 24 USC; Wooden Legacy Championship	L 43–58	4–2	11 – Pulliam	7 – Mensah	2 – Bradley	Anaheim Convention Center (2,890); Anaheim, CA
November 30, 2021*; 7:00 p.m., Stadium		Long Beach State	W 72–47	5–2	16 – Pulliam	11 – Mensah	5 – Pulliam	Viejas Arena (11,917); San Diego, CA
December 4, 2021*; 10:00 a.m., CBS		at No. 24 Michigan	L 58–72	5–3	22 – Bradley	7 – Johnson	2 – Tied	Crisler Center (12,523); Ann Arbor, MI
December 8, 2021*; 7:00 p.m., YurView		Cal State Fullerton	W 66–56	6–3	22 – Bradley	9 – Mensah	3 – Tied	Viejas Arena (11,823); San Diego, CA
December 17, 2021*; 7:00 p.m., FloSports		vs. Saint Mary's; Jerry Colangelo Classic	W 63–53	7–3	15 – Pulliam	13 – Mensah	6 – Pulliam	Footprint Center (1,500); Phoenix, AZ
December 22, 2021*; 6:00 p.m., Stadium		UC San Diego	W 78–57	8–3	19 – Mensah	9 – Mensah	7 – Pulliam	Viejas Arena (10,912); San Diego, CA
December 28, 2021*; 6:00 p.m., YurView		San Diego Christian	Canceled due to COVID-19 protocols					Viejas Arena; San Diego, CA
Mountain West regular season
January 1, 2022; 1:00 p.m., CBS		at UNLV; Rivalry	W 62–55	9–3 (1–0)	17 – Bradley	11 – Johnson	3 – Seiko	Thomas & Mack Center (5,082); Paradise, NV
January 8, 2022; 1:00 p.m., CBS		No. 20 Colorado State	W 79–49	10–3 (2–0)	26 – Bradley	8 – Arop	4 – Pulliam	Viejas Arena (10,323); San Diego, CA
January 15, 2022; 6:00 p.m., CBSSN		at New Mexico	Canceled					The Pit; Albuquerque, NM
January 22, 2022; 6:00 p.m., CBSSN		Boise State	L 37–42	10–4 (2–1)	10 – Tied	9 – Mensah	3 – Butler	Viejas Arena (11,357); San Diego, CA
January 24, 2022; 6:00 p.m., CBSSN		UNLV; Rivalry/Originally scheduled for Jan. 18	W 80–55	11–4 (3–1)	27 – Bradley	7 – Johnson	4 – Bradley	Viejas Arena (10,528); San Diego, CA
January 26, 2022; 7:30 p.m., FS1		at Utah State	L 57–75	11–5 (3–2)	19 – Bradley	6 – Bradley	5 – Bradley	Smith Spectrum (7,312); Logan, UT
January 31, 2022; 7:00 p.m., FS1		New Mexico	W 72–47	12–5 (4–2)	14 – Tied	10 – Johnson	6 – Pulliam	Viejas Arena (10,951); San Diego, CA
February 4, 2022; 6:00 p.m., FS1		at Colorado State	L 57–58	12–6 (4–3)	27 – Bradley	8 – Arop	3 – Pulliam	Moby Arena (8,063); Fort Collins, CO
February 6, 2022; 1:00 p.m., CBSSN		Nevada	W 65–63	13–6 (5–3)	26 – Bradley	7 – Bradley	3 – Tied	Viejas Arena (10,330); San Diego, CA
February 9, 2022; 8:00 p.m., CBSSN		at San José State	W 72–62	14–6 (6–3)	28 – Bradley	8 – Tomaic	3 – Tied	Provident Credit Union Event Center (2,541); San Jose, CA
February 12, 2022; 5:00 p.m., CBSSN		Air Force	W 76–64	15–6 (7–3)	14 – Mensah	6 – Mensah	5 – Bradley	Viejas Arena (10,784); San Diego, CA
February 15, 2022; 7:00 p.m., CBSSN		Utah State	W 75–56	16–6 (8–3)	22 – Bradley	8 – Mensah	5 – Bradley	Viejas Arena (10,516); San Diego, CA
February 19, 2022; 7:00 p.m., CBSSN		at Fresno State	W 61–44	17–6 (9–3)	20 – Baker-Mazara	7 – Bradley	8 – Pulliam	Save Mart Center (7,261); Fresno, CA
February 22, 2022; 7:00 p.m., CBSSN		at Boise State	L 57–58	17–7 (9–4)	13 – Mensah	11 – Mensah	5 – Bradley	ExtraMile Arena (9,193); Boise, ID
February 25, 2022; 8:00 p.m., FS1		San José State	W 77–52	18–7 (10–4)	16 – Baker-Mazara	13 – Mensah	3 – Tied	Viejas Arena (12,071); San Diego, CA
February 28, 2022; 6:00 p.m., CBSSN		at Wyoming	W 73–66	19–7 (11–4)	30 – Bradley	9 – Mensah	4 – Bradley	Arena-Auditorium (5,438); Laramie, WY
March 3, 2022; 8:00 p.m., CBSSN		Fresno State	W 65–64 ^{2OT}	20–7 (12–4)	26 – Bradley	10 – Bradley	4 – Pulliam	Viejas Arena (12,414); San Diego, CA
March 5, 2022; 7:30 p.m., CBSSN		at Nevada	W 79–78	21–7 (13–4)	24 – Bradley	6 – Tied	4 – Pulliam	Lawlor Events Center (8,173); Reno, NV
Mountain West tournament
March 10, 2022; 8:30 p.m., CBSSN	(3)	vs. (6) Fresno State; Quarterfinals	W 53–46	22–7	11 – Tied	6 – Tied	4 – Butler	Thomas & Mack Center; Paradise, NV
March 11, 2022; 9:00 p.m., CBSSN	(3)	vs. (2) No. 23 Colorado State; Semifinals	W 63–58	23–7	11 – Pulliam	6 – Tied	6 – Pulliam	Thomas & Mack Center; Paradise, NV
March 12, 2022; 3:00 p.m., CBS/Paramount+	(3)	vs. (1) Boise State; Championship	L 52–53	23–8	17 – Bradley	10 – Mensah	3 – Pulliam	Thomas & Mack Center; Paradise, NV
NCAA tournament
March 17, 2022; 4:27 p.m., TruTV	(8 MW)	vs. (9 MW) Creighton; First Round	L 69–72 ^{OT}	23–9	17 – Baker-Mazara	8 – Bradley	3 – Tied	Dickies Arena (10,560); Fort Worth, TX
*Non-conference game. ^{#}Rankings from AP Poll. (#) Tournament seedings in parentheses. All times are in Pacific Time.

== Rankings ==
Ranking movements Legend: ██ Increase in ranking ██ Decrease in ranking — = Not ranked RV = Received votes
	Week																		
Poll	Pre	1	2	3	4	5	6	7	8	9	10	11	12	13	14	15	16	17	Final
AP	RV	RV	—	RV	—	—	—	—	—	—	RV								
Coaches	—	*																	

*AP does not release post-NCAA Tournament rankings. No coaches poll for Week 1.
