= 2021–22 UC Santa Barbara Gauchos men's basketball team =

American college basketball season

2021–22 UC Santa Barbara Gauchos men's basketball
- Conference: Big West Conference
- Record: 17–11 (8–5 Big West)
- Head coach: Joe Pasternack (5th season)
- Associate head coach: John Rillie
- Assistant coaches: Larry Lewis; Ben Tucker
- Home arena: The Thunderdome

2021–22 Big West men's basketball standings
	Conf.				Overall
Team	W		L	PCT	W		L	PCT
Long Beach State	12	–	3	.800	20	–	13	.606
Cal State Fullerton †	11	–	4	.733	21	–	11	.656
Hawai'i	10	–	5	.667	17	–	11	.607
UC Irvine	9	–	5	.643	15	–	10	.600
UC Santa Barbara	8	–	5	.615	17	–	11	.607
UC Riverside	9	–	6	.600	16	–	12	.571
UC Davis	5	–	6	.455	13	–	11	.542
UC San Diego*	7	–	11	.389	13	–	16	.448
Cal State Northridge	3	–	13	.188	7	–	23	.233
Cal State Bakersfield	2	–	12	.143	8	–	19	.296
Cal Poly	2	–	12	.143	7	–	21	.250
† 2022 Big West tournament winner * ineligible for the 2022 NCAA tournament and 2022 Big West tournament due to transition period; Big West games not counted in standings

The 2021–22 UC Santa Barbara Gauchos men's basketball team represented the University of California, Santa Barbara in the 2021–22 NCAA Division I men's basketball season. The Gauchos, led by fifth-year head coach Joe Pasternack, played their home games at The Thunderdome in Santa Barbara, California as members of the Big West Conference. They finished the season 17–11, 8–5 in Big West play to finish in fifth place. They defeated UC Irvine in the quarterfinals of the Big West tournament before losing to Long Beach State in the semifinals.

== Previous season ==
In a season limited due to the ongoing COVID-19 pandemic, the Gauchos finished the season 22–5, 13–3 in Big West play to win the Big West regular season championship. They defeated Long Beach State, UC Davis, and UC Irvine to win the Big West tournament. As a result, they received the conference's automatic bid to the NCAA tournament as the No. 12 seed in the West region. There they lost in the first round to Creighton.

== Roster ==
2021–22 UC Santa Barbara Gauchos men's basketball team
Players
Coaches

Pos.	#	Name	Height	Weight	Year	Previous school	Hometown
G	0	Sékou Touré	6 ft 5 in (1.96 m)	195 lb (88 kg)	Sr	Prolific Prep Academy	Conakry, Guinea
F	1	Jay Nagle	6 ft 8 in (2.03 m)	215 lb (98 kg)	Sr	Will C. Wood HS	Vacaville, CA
G	2	Josh Pierre-Louis	6 ft 4 in (1.93 m)	190 lb (86 kg)	Jr	Temple	Plainfield, NJ
G	3	Ajare Sanni	6 ft 3 in (1.91 m)	180 lb (82 kg)	RS Jr	Pacific	Houston, TX
G	4	Cole Anderson	6 ft 4 in (1.93 m)	185 lb (84 kg)	Fr	Clovis West HS	Fresno, CA
F	5	Miles Norris	6 ft 10 in (2.08 m)	220 lb (100 kg)	Sr	Brewster Academy	San Diego, CA
G	10	Calvin Wishart	6 ft 2 in (1.88 m)	185 lb (84 kg)	RS Jr	Georgia Southern	Delano, MN
G	11	Zach Harvey	6 ft 6 in (1.98 m)	190 lb (86 kg)	Jr	Cincinnati	Overland Park, KS
F	12	Amadou Sow	6 ft 9 in (2.06 m)	235 lb (107 kg)	Sr	Prolific Prep Academy	Bamako, Mali
G	13	Ajay Mitchell	6 ft 4 in (1.93 m)	180 lb (82 kg)	Fr	Limburg United	Ans, Liège, Belgium
F	14	Jakov Kukic	6 ft 10 in (2.08 m)	225 lb (102 kg)	RS So	La Lumiere School	Split, Croatia
F	23	Ariel Bland	6 ft 7 in (2.01 m)	215 lb (98 kg)	Fr	Golden State Prep	Eden Prairie, MN
F	24	Robinson Idehen	6 ft 10 in (2.08 m)	225 lb (102 kg)	GS	Trinity Valley CC	Tudela, Navarre, Spain
F	40	David Pickles	6 ft 10 in (2.08 m)	235 lb (107 kg)	Fr	Mercer Island HS	Seattle, WA
G	50	Gage Gomez	6 ft 3 in (1.91 m)	190 lb (86 kg)	So	Arroyo Grande HS	Arroyo Grande, CA
G	51	Henry Hartwell	6 ft 5 in (1.96 m)	180 lb (82 kg)	Fr	El Camino HS	Oceanside, CA
G	53	Max Sheldon	5 ft 11 in (1.8 m)	180 lb (82 kg)	Fr	San Marcos HS	Santa Barbara, CA

Head coach

- Joe Pasternack (Indiana)

Assistant coach(es)

- John Rillie (Gonzaga)
- Larry Lewis (Morehouse)
- Ben Tucker (Arizona)

Legend

- (C) Team captain
- (S) Suspended
- (I) Ineligible
- (W) Walk-on
- Injured
- Current redshirt

Roster
Last update: January 20, 2022

== Schedule and results ==
Date time, TV	Rank^{#}	Opponent^{#}	Result	Record	Site (attendance) city, state
Non-conference regular season
November 10, 2021*; 7:00 pm, ESPN+		San Francisco State	W 119–65	1–0	The Thunderdome (3,037); Santa Barbara, CA
November 15, 2021*; 8:00 pm, P12N		at Washington State	L 65–73	1–1	Beasley Coliseum (2,928); Pullman, WA
November 20, 2021*; 1:00 pm, ESPN+		Chicago State; Cerebro Sports Cali Jam	W 81–50	2–1	The Thunderdome (824); Santa Barbara, CA
November 24, 2021*; 1:00 pm, ESPN+		Arkansas–Pine Bluff; Cerebro Sports Cali Jam	W 86–58	3–1	The Thunderdome (702); Santa Barbara, CA
November 29, 2021*; 6:00 pm, ESPN+		UT Arlington	L 62–70	3–2	The Thunderdome (483); Santa Barbara, CA
December 3, 2021*; 7:00 pm, ESPN+		Pepperdine	W 86–74	4–2	The Thunderdome (2,211); Santa Barbara, CA
December 5, 2021*; 1:00 pm, ESPN+		California Lutheran	W 87–66	5–2	The Thunderdome (432); Santa Barbara, CA
December 11, 2021*; 3:00 pm, WCCN		at Saint Mary's (CA)	L 59–80	5–3	University Credit Union Pavilion (3,019); Moraga, CA
December 14, 2021*; 7:00 pm, WCCN		at Pacific	L 71–80 ^{OT}	5–4	Alex G. Spanos Center (1,162); Stockton, CA
December 19, 2021*; 7:00 pm, ESPN+		Florida A&M	W 73–62	6–4	The Thunderdome; Santa Barbara, CA
December 22, 2021*; 1:00 pm, ESPN+		Idaho State	W 56–43	7–4	The Thunderdome (526); Santa Barbara, CA
Big West regular season
December 30, 2021; 7:00 pm, ESPN+		at UC San Diego	L 83–85 ^{OT}	7–5	RIMAC Arena (0); La Jolla, CA
January 1, 2022; 6:00 pm, ESPN+		at UC Irvine	Canceled due to COVID-19 protocols		Bren Events Center; Irvine, CA
January 6, 2022; 7:00 pm, ESPN+		Cal Poly	Canceled due to COVID-19 protocols		The Thunderdome; Santa Barbara, CA
January 8, 2022; 7:00 pm, ESPN+		Cal State Bakersfield	Canceled due to COVID-19 protocols		The Thunderdome; Santa Barbara, CA
January 13, 2022; 7:00 pm, ESPN+		at Long Beach State	L 58–65	7–6 (0–1)	Walter Pyramid (812); Long Beach, CA
January 15, 2022; 6:00 pm, ESPN+		at Cal State Fullerton	L 73–79	7–7 (0–2)	Titan Gym (290); Fullerton, CA
January 20, 2022; 7:00 pm, ESPN+		UC Riverside	Canceled due to COVID-19 protocols		The Thunderdome; Santa Barbara, CA
January 22, 2022; 1:00 pm, Spectrum SportsNet		UC Davis	Canceled due to COVID-19 protocols		The Thunderdome; Santa Barbara, CA
January 25, 2022; 7:00 pm, ESPN+		at CSUN	W 72–45	8–7 (1–2)	Matadome (103); Northridge, CA
January 29, 2022; 9:00 pm, ESPN+		at Hawaiʻi	L 62–65	8–8 (1–3)	Stan Sheriff Center (3,735); Honolulu, HI
February 3, 2022; 7:00 pm, ESPN+		UC Irvine	L 52–53	8–9 (1–4)	The Thunderdome (999); Santa Barbara, CA
February 5, 2022*; 1:00 pm, Spectrum SportsNet		UC San Diego	W 84–48	9–9	The Thunderdome (999); Santa Barbara, CA
February 10, 2022; 7:00 pm, ESPN+		at Cal State Bakersfield	W 74–62	10–9 (2–4)	Icardo Center (1,307); Bakersfield, CA
February 12, 2022; 7:00 pm, ESPN+		at Cal Poly	W 69–64	11–9 (3–4)	Mott Athletics Center (2,117); San Luis Obispo, CA
February 17, 2022; 7:00 pm, ESPN+		Cal State Fullerton	L 58–67	11–10 (3–5)	The Thunderdome (1,012); Santa Barbara, CA
February 19, 2022; 7:00 pm, ESPN+		Long Beach State	W 84–71	12–10 (4–5)	The Thunderdome (1,342); Santa Barbara, CA
February 24, 2022; 7:00 pm, ESPN+		at UC Davis	W 76–69 ^{OT}	13–10 (5–5)	University Credit Union Center (1,383); Davis, CA
February 26, 2022; 5:00 pm, ESPN+		UC Riverside	W 97–90 ^{2OT}	14–10 (6–5)	SRC Arena (1,004); Riverside, CA
March 1, 2022; 7:00 pm, ESPN+		CSUN	W 70–61	15–10 (7–5)	The Thunderdome (2,300); Santa Barbara, CA
March 3, 2022; 7:00 pm, ESPN+		Hawaiʻi	W 67–60	16–10 (8–5)	The Thunderdome (2,764); Santa Barbara, CA
Big West tournament
March 10, 2022; 2:30 pm, ESPN+	(5)	vs. (4) UC Irvine; Quarterfinals	W 78–69	17–10	Dollar Loan Center; Henderson, NV
March 11, 2022; 6:00 pm, ESPN+	(5)	vs. (1) Long Beach State; Semifinals	L 64–67	17–11	Dollar Loan Center; Henderson, NV
*Non-conference game. ^{#}Rankings from AP Poll. (#) Tournament seedings in parentheses. W=West. All times are in Pacific.
