= 2021–22 UC Irvine Anteaters men's basketball team =

American college basketball season

2021–22 UC Irvine Anteaters men's basketball
- Conference: Big West Conference
- Record: 15–10 (9–5 Big West)
- Head coach: Russell Turner (12th season)
- Assistant coaches: Ryan Badrtalei; Michael Wilder; Alex Young
- Captains: Collin Welp; Ofure Ujadughele
- Home arena: Bren Events Center (Capacity: 5,000)

2021–22 Big West men's basketball standings
	Conf.				Overall
Team	W		L	PCT	W		L	PCT
Long Beach State	12	–	3	.800	20	–	13	.606
Cal State Fullerton †	11	–	4	.733	21	–	11	.656
Hawai'i	10	–	5	.667	17	–	11	.607
UC Irvine	9	–	5	.643	15	–	10	.600
UC Santa Barbara	8	–	5	.615	17	–	11	.607
UC Riverside	9	–	6	.600	16	–	12	.571
UC Davis	5	–	6	.455	13	–	11	.542
UC San Diego*	7	–	11	.389	13	–	16	.448
Cal State Northridge	3	–	13	.188	7	–	23	.233
Cal State Bakersfield	2	–	12	.143	8	–	19	.296
Cal Poly	2	–	12	.143	7	–	21	.250
† 2022 Big West tournament winner * ineligible for the 2022 NCAA tournament and 2022 Big West tournament due to transition period; Big West games not counted in standings

The 2021–22 UC Irvine Anteaters men's basketball team represented the University of California, Irvine in the 2021–22 NCAA Division I men's basketball season. They played their home games at the Bren Events Center in Irvine, California as a member of the Big West Conference. The Anteaters were led by 12th-year head coach Russell Turner.

== Previous season ==
The team finished the season with an 18–9 (10–4) record finishing 2nd place in the standings and advanced to the 2021 Big West Conference men's basketball tournament where they were defeated by UC Santa Barbara 63–79. The Anteaters continued their success finishing 1st or 2nd for 7 straight seasons in the Big West Conference and 4 straight Big West tournament Championship games (the 2020 Big West Conference men's basketball tournament was canceled due to the COVID-19 pandemic). The school set a new scoring record and the largest margin of victory (80) on November 28, 2020 over NCCAA opponent Bethesda University by the score of 135–55. Also new school records broken in that game were assists (31) and FGs made (56). New Bren Events Center records broken were the most points scored in a first half (70) and game FG % (0.691).

== Roster ==
2021–22 UC Irvine Anteaters men's basketball team
Players
Coaches

Pos.	#	Name	Height	Weight	Year	Previous school	Hometown
F	0	JC Butler	6 ft 5 in (1.96 m)	190 lb (86 kg)	RS Jr	The Prairie School	Racine, Wisconsin
G	1	Dawson Baker	6 ft 4 in (1.93 m)	190 lb (86 kg)	So	Capistrano Valley High School	Coto de Caza, California
G	2	Justin Hohn	6 ft 2 in (1.88 m)	185 lb (84 kg)	RS So	Tea High	Sioux Falls, South Dakota
G	3	Devin Tillis (injured)	6 ft 6 in (1.98 m)	210 lb (95 kg)	So	Windward High	Los Angeles, California
G	4	Andre Henry	6 ft 4 in (1.93 m)	185 lb (84 kg)	So	Saint Francis High School	La Cañada Flintridge, California
G	5	Isaiah Lee	6 ft 2 in (1.88 m)	190 lb (86 kg)	Jr	Australian Institute of Sport	Sydney, NSW, Australia
G	10	Ofure Ujadughele (W,C)	6 ft 5 in (1.96 m)	215 lb (98 kg)	RS So	Chino Hills High School	Chino Hills, California
F	11	Hunter Ruck	6 ft 9 in (2.06 m)	235 lb (107 kg)	So	Rancho Solano Prep	Scottsdale, Arizona
G	13	Austin Johnson	6 ft 9 in (2.06 m)	235 lb (107 kg)	Jr	Link Year Prep/Wheeler High School	Marietta, Georgia
C	15	Bent Leuchten	7 ft 0 in (2.13 m)	258 lb (117 kg)	Fr	Josef-Effner Gymnasium	Karlsfeld, Bavaria, Germany
G	21	Langston Redfield (W)	6 ft 3 in (1.91 m)	180 lb (82 kg)	Fr	Capistrano Valley High School	Mission Viejo, California
G	22	DJ Davis	6 ft 1 in (1.85 m)	170 lb (77 kg)	So	Riverside Polytechnic High School	Moreno Valley, California
F	25	Emmanuel Tshimanga	7 ft 0 in (2.13 m)	270 lb (122 kg)	RS So	Bella Vista Prep	Scottsdale, Arizona
F	31	Dean Keeler	6 ft 11 in (2.11 m)	240 lb (109 kg)	Jr	Marina High School	Westminster, California
F	40	Collin Welp (C)	6 ft 9 in (2.06 m)	225 lb (102 kg)	RS Sr	Seattle Preparatory School	Seattle, Washington
F	43	Akiva McBirney-Griffin (redshirt)	6 ft 9 in (2.06 m)	220 lb (100 kg)	Fr	St John's College, Hamilton	Hamilton, New Zealand

Head coach

- Russell Turner (Hampden–Sydney)

Assistant coach(es)

- Ryan Badrtalei (UCLA)
- Michael Wilder (UC Irvine)
- Alex Young (UC Irvine)

Legend

- (C) Team captain
- (S) Suspended
- (I) Ineligible
- (W) Walk-on
- Injured
- Current redshirt

Roster
Last update: 23 September 2021

== Schedule and results ==
Date time, TV	Rank^{#}	Opponent^{#}	Result	Record	High points	High rebounds	High assists	Site (attendance) city, state
Exhibition
November 05, 2021*; 7:00 pm, ESPN+		Cal State Dominguez Hills	W 84–59	–	15 – Davis	6 – Johnson	6 – Hohn	Bren Events Center (1,114); Irvine, CA
Non-conference regular season
November 09, 2021*; 6:00 pm, ESPN+		at New Mexico State	L 51–62	0–1	13 – Welp	7 – Hohn	1 – Tied	Pan American Center (5,056); Las Cruces, NM
November 13, 2021*; 6:00 pm, ESPN+		Boise State	W 58–50	1–1	11 – Welp	8 – Johnson	6 – Welp	Bren Events Center (2,197); Irvine, CA
November 16, 2021*; 7:00 pm, ESPN+		La Verne	W 100–41	2–1	18 – Butler	7 – Ujadughele	8 – Lee	Bren Events Center (987); Irvine, CA
November 20, 2021*; 6:00 pm, ESPN+		Pepperdine	W 82–48	3–1	19 – Baker	7 – Johnson	4 – Welp	Bren Events Center (1,641); Irvine, CA
November 27, 2021*; 4:30 pm, WCC Network		at Santa Clara	W 69–64	4–1	17 – Welp	10 – Welp	4 – Hohn	Leavey Center (834); Santa Clara, CA
December 03, 2021*; 7:00 pm, ESPN+		Bethesda	W 86–54	5–1	15 – Henry	12 – Johnson	3 – Henry	Bren Events Center (866); Irvine, CA
December 11, 2021*; 4:00 pm, MW Network		at Fresno State	L 55–63	5–2	16 – Davis	8 – Johnson	3 – Tied	Save Mart Center (4,501); Fresno, CA
December 15, 2021*; 6:00 pm, P12N		at No. 10 USC	L 61–66	5–3	24 – Welp	9 – Johnson	2 – Davis	Galen Center (3,253); Los Angeles, CA
December 19, 2021*; 10:00 am		vs. Duquesne	L 54–76	5–4	14 – Tshimanga	4 – Tied	5 – Hohn	LeBron James Arena (211); Akron, OH
December 21, 2021*; 4:00 pm, ESPN3		at Buffalo	Postponed due to COVID-19 issues.					Alumni Arena; Amherst, NY
Big West regular season
December 30, 2021; 7:00 pm, ESPN+		CSUN	Canceled due to COVID-19 protocols.					Bren Events Center; Irvine, CA
January 01, 2022; 6:00 pm, ESPN+		UC Santa Barbara	Canceled due to COVID-19 protocols.					Bren Events Center; Irvine, CA
January 06, 2022; 6:00 pm, ESPN+		at UC Davis	Canceled due to COVID-19 concerns.					University Credit Union Center; Davis, CA
January 08, 2022; 5:00 pm, ESPN+		at UC Riverside	W 68–51	6–4 (1–0)	30 – Welp	8 – Welp	4 – Davis	SRC Arena (0); Riverside, CA
January 11, 2022*; 7:00 pm, ESPN+		UC San Diego	Canceled due to COVID-19 protocols.					Bren Events Center; Irvine, CA
January 13, 2022; 10:00 pm, Spectrum OC16, ESPN+		at Hawaiʻi	L 56–72	6–5 (1–1)	11 – Welp	8 – Welp	2 – Welp	Stan Sheriff Center (3,245); Honolulu, HI
January 20, 2022*; 7:00 pm, ESPN+		Cal State Fullerton	L 63–65	6–6 (1–2)	19 – Davis	9 – Johnson	6 – Lee	Bren Events Center (931); Irvine, CA
January 22, 2022*; 1:00 pm, SNLA, ESPN+		at Long Beach State	L 67–73	6–7 (1–3)	20 – Welp	11 – Welp	3 – Hohn	Walter Pyramid (982); Long Beach, CA
January 27, 2022; 7:00 pm, ESPN+		Cal State Bakersfield	W 57–52	7–7 (2–3)	11 – Johnson	5 – Tied	3 – Hohn	Bren Events Center (790); Irvine, CA
January 29, 2022; 6:00 pm, ESPN+		Cal Poly	W 72–48	8–7 (3–3)	13 – Hohn	6 – Tshimanga	2 – Welp	Bren Events Center (1,532); Irvine, CA
February 03, 2022; 7:00 pm, ESPN+		at UC Santa Barbara	W 53–52	9–7 (4–3)	17 – Welp	8 – Welp	4 – Butler	The Thunderdome (999); Santa Barbara, CA
February 05, 2022; 7:00 pm, ESPN+		at CSUN	W 75–70	10–7 (5–3)	24 – Baker	9 – Welp	3 – Ujadughele	Matadome (300); Northridge, CA
February 10, 2022; 7:00 pm, ESPN+		UC Riverside	W 66–56	11–7 (6–3)	15 – Welp	13 – Welp	3 – Davis	Bren Events Center (1,364); Irvine, CA
February 12, 2022; 7:30 pm, ESPN+		UC Davis	Canceled due to COVID-19 concerns.					Bren Events Center; Irvine, CA
February 15, 2022*; 7:00 pm, ESPN+		at UC San Diego	W 56–50	12–7	14 – Davis	9 – Johnson	4 – Welp	RIMAC Arena (1,753); La Jolla, CA
February 19, 2022; 1:00 pm, SNLA ESPN+		Hawaiʻi	W 77–52	13–7 (7–3)	18 – Welp	13 – Welp	2 – Tied	Bren Events Center (1,529); Irvine, CA
February 24, 2022; 7:00 pm, ESPN+		at Cal State Fullerton	L 64–66	13–9 (7–4)	17 – Welp	5 – Tied	3 – Baker	Titan Gym (1,013); Fullerton, CA
February 26, 2022; 9:00 pm, ESPNU		Long Beach State	W 77–72	14–8 (8–4)	18 – Baker	7 – Welp	7 – Hohn	Bren Events Center (2,480); Irvine, CA
March 03, 2022; 7:00 pm, ESPN+		at Cal Poly	L 54–65	14–9 (8–5)	18 – Baker	5 – Lee	3 – Davis	Mott Athletics Center (1,868); San Luis Obispo, CA
March 05, 2022; 1:00 pm, SNLA, ESPN+		at Cal State Bakersfield	W 66–61	15–9 (9–5)	24 – Davis	8 – Johnson	2 – Tied	Icardo Center (1,323); Bakersfield, CA
Big West tournament
March 10, 2022; 2:30 pm, ESPN+	(4)	vs. (5) UC Santa Barbara; Quarterfinals	L 69–78	15–10	17 – Welp	8 – Welp	2 – Tied	Dollar Loan Center; Henderson, NV
*Non-conference game. ^{#}Rankings from AP Poll. (#) Tournament seedings in parentheses.
