= 2021–22 UC San Diego Tritons men's basketball team =

American college basketball team season

2021–22 UC San Diego Tritons men's basketball
- Conference: Big West Conference
- Record: 13–16 (7–11 Big West)
- Head coach: Eric Olen (9th season)
- Associate head coach: Clint Allard
- Assistant coaches: Nick Booker; Christian Bayne
- Home arena: RIMAC Arena

2021–22 Big West men's basketball standings
	Conf.				Overall
Team	W		L	PCT	W		L	PCT
Long Beach State	12	–	3	.800	20	–	13	.606
Cal State Fullerton †	11	–	4	.733	21	–	11	.656
Hawai'i	10	–	5	.667	17	–	11	.607
UC Irvine	9	–	5	.643	15	–	10	.600
UC Santa Barbara	8	–	5	.615	17	–	11	.607
UC Riverside	9	–	6	.600	16	–	12	.571
UC Davis	5	–	6	.455	13	–	11	.542
UC San Diego*	7	–	11	.389	13	–	16	.448
Cal State Northridge	3	–	13	.188	7	–	23	.233
Cal State Bakersfield	2	–	12	.143	8	–	19	.296
Cal Poly	2	–	12	.143	7	–	21	.250
† 2022 Big West tournament winner * ineligible for the 2022 NCAA tournament and 2022 Big West tournament due to transition period; Big West games not counted in standings

The 2021–22 UC San Diego Tritons men's basketball team represented the University of California, San Diego in the 2021–22 NCAA Division I men's basketball season. The Tritons, led by ninth-year head coach Eric Olen, played their games at the RIMAC Arena as members of the Big West Conference.

The Tritons were ineligible for postseason tournaments, including the NCAA tournament and Big West tournament, as they were in the second year of the a four-year mandatory transition period to Division I. Their conference games did not count on the records of UCSD or any other member of the Big West.

== Previous season ==
In a season limited due to the ongoing COVID-19 pandemic, the Tritons finished the 2020–21 season 7–10, 4–8 in Big West play, although their Big West games were not counted in the conference standings. They were ineligible for the NCAA tournament and Big West tournament as they were in the first year of their transition period from the California Collegiate Athletic Association in Division II.

== Roster ==
2021–22 UC San Diego Tritons men's basketball team
Players
Coaches

Pos.	#	Name	Height	Weight	Year	Previous school	Hometown
G	0	Lunden Taylor	6 ft 3 in (1.91 m)	180 lb (82 kg)	RS Jr	San Joaquin Memorial HS	Fresno, CA
G	2	Michael Pearson Jr.	5 ft 9 in (1.75 m)	160 lb (73 kg)	Fr	Modesto Christian School	Tracy, CA
F	3	Justin DeGraaf	6 ft 7 in (2.01 m)	210 lb (95 kg)	Fr	Hudsonville HS	Hudsonville, MI
G	4	Bryce Pope	6 ft 3 in (1.91 m)	185 lb (84 kg)	RS So	Torrey Pines HS	San Diego, CA
F	5	Fallou Cisse	6 ft 7 in (2.01 m)	216 lb (98 kg)	Fr	Prolific Prep	Thiès, Senegal
F	10	Toni Rocak	6 ft 9 in (2.06 m)	220 lb (100 kg)	Sr	Regis	Geneva, Switzerland
F	11	Matt Gray	6 ft 8 in (2.03 m)	230 lb (104 kg)	RS Jr	Salt Lake CC	Orange, Australia
G	12	Justin Pratt	6 ft 3 in (1.91 m)	195 lb (88 kg)	RS Jr	De La Salle HS	Lafayette, CA
F	13	Jake Kosakowski	6 ft 6 in (1.98 m)	200 lb (91 kg)	RS So	Whitney Young HS	Chicago, IL
G	14	Jake Killingsworth	6 ft 5 in (1.96 m)	210 lb (95 kg)	GS	Columbia	San Carlos, CA
G	20	Vuk Vulikic	6 ft 5 in (1.96 m)	205 lb (93 kg)	So	UTEP	Belgrade, Serbia
G	22	Jace Roquemore	6 ft 5 in (1.96 m)	170 lb (77 kg)	RS So	Foothill HS	Henderson, NV
G	23	Kaden Rasheed	6 ft 1 in (1.85 m)	185 lb (84 kg)	Sr	Santa Margarita HS	Ladera Ranch, CA
G	24	John Diener	6 ft 5 in (1.96 m)	195 lb (88 kg)	RS Jr	Cedarburg HS	Cedarburg, WI
F	33	J'Raan Brooks	6 ft 9 in (2.06 m)	215 lb (98 kg)	Jr	Washington	Seattle, WA
F	35	Francis Nwaokorie	6 ft 7 in (2.01 m)	220 lb (100 kg)	Fr	Champlin Park HS	Brooklyn Park, MN

Head coach

- Eric Olen (Spring Hill)

Assistant coach(es)

- Clint Allard (UC San Diego)
- Nick Booker (Davidson)
- Christian Bayne (UC San Diego)

Legend

- (C) Team captain
- (S) Suspended
- (I) Ineligible
- (W) Walk-on
- Injured
- Current redshirt

Roster
Last update: January 20, 2022

== Schedule and results ==
Date time, TV	Rank^{#}	Opponent^{#}	Result	Record	Site (attendance) city, state
Exhibition
November 5, 2021*; 7:00 pm, ESPN+		at Loyola Marymount	L 44–57	–	Gersten Pavilion; Los Angeles, CA
Non-conference regular season
November 9, 2021*; 2:00 pm, P12N		at California	W 80–67	1–0	Haas Pavilion (3,936); Berkeley, CA
November 13, 2021*; 7:00 pm, ESPN+		George Washington	W 75–55	2–0	RIMAC Arena (2,415); La Jolla, CA
November 16, 2021*; 7:00 pm		San Diego Christian	W 97–60	3–0	RIMAC Arena (2,415); La Jolla, CA
November 20, 2021*; 7:00 pm, ESPN+		at Sacramento State	W 71–56	4–0	Hornets Nest (845); Sacramento, CA
November 24, 2021*; 6:30 pm, ESPN+		at Montana; Zootown Classic	L 61–71	4–1	Dahlberg Arena (2,917); Missoula, MT
November 25, 2021*; 4:00 pm		vs. Southern Miss; Zootown Classic	L 55–56	4–2	Dahlberg Arena (127); Missoula, MT
November 26, 2021*; 4:00 pm		vs. UNC Wilmington; Zootown Classic	Canceled due to COVID-19 protocols		Dahlberg Arena; Missoula, MT
December 2, 2021*; 7:00 pm, ESPN+		Eastern Michigan	W 83–74	5–2	RIMAC Arena (838); La Jolla, CA
December 12, 2021*; 5:00 pm, ESPN+		at Seattle	L 51–73	5–3	Climate Pledge Arena (1,998); Seattle, WA
December 15, 2021*; 6:00 pm, Altitude		at Denver	L 56–64	5–4	Magness Arena (318); Denver, CO
December 18, 2021*; 4:00 pm		Caltech	W 93–52	6–4	RIMAC Arena (404); La Jolla, CA
December 22, 2021*; 6:00 pm, Stadium		at San Diego State	L 57–78	6–5	Viejas Arena (10,912); San Diego, CA
Big West regular season
December 30, 2021; 7:00 pm, ESPN+		UC Santa Barbara	W 85–83 ^{OT}	7–5 (1–0)	RIMAC Arena (0); La Jolla, CA
January 1, 2022; 7:00 pm, ESPN+		CSUN	W 72–64	8–5 (2–0)	RIMAC Arena (0); La Jolla, CA
January 6, 2022; 7:00 pm, ESPN+		at UC Riverside	L 51–59	8–6 (2–1)	UC Riverside Student Recreation Center (0); Riverside, CA
January 8, 2022; 7:00 pm, ESPN+		at UC Davis	L 71–78	8–7 (2–2)	University Credit Union Center (0); Davis, CA
January 11, 2022; 7:00 pm, ESPN+		at UC Irvine	Canceled due to COVID-19 protocols		Bren Events Center; Irvine, CA
January 15, 2022; 9:00 pm, SPECTSN		at Hawaii	L 56–79	8–8 (2–3)	Stan Sheriff Center (3,376); Honolulu, HI
January 20, 2022; 7:00 pm, ESPN+		Long Beach State	L 69–87	8–9 (2–4)	RIMAC Arena (0); La Jolla, CA
January 22, 2022; 6:00 pm, ESPN+		at Cal State Fullerton	L 80–83	8–10 (2–5)	Titan Gym (389); Fullerton, CA
January 27, 2022; 7:00 pm, ESPN+		Cal Poly	L 55–59	8–11 (2–6)	RIMAC Arena (0); La Jolla, CA
January 29, 2022; 7:00 pm, ESPN+		Cal State Bakersfield	W 83–75	9–11 (3–6)	RIMAC Arena (0); La Jolla, CA
February 3, 2022; 7:00 pm, ESPN+		at CSUN	W 83–77	10–11 (4–6)	Matadome (240); Northridge, CA
February 5, 2022; 1:00 pm, Spectrum SportsNet		at UC Santa Barbara	L 48–84	10–12 (4–7)	The Thunderdome (999); Santa Barbara, CA
February 10, 2022; 7:00 pm, ESPN+		UC Davis	Canceled due to COVID-19 protocols		RIMAC Arena; La Jolla, CA
February 12, 2022; 1:00 pm, Spectrum SportsNet/ESPN+		UC Riverside	W 85–62	11–12 (5–7)	RIMAC Arena (724); La Jolla, CA
February 15, 2022; 7:00 pm, ESPN+		UC Irvine	L 50–56	11–13 (5–8)	RIMAC Arena (1,753); La Jolla, CA
February 17, 2022; 7:00 pm, ESPN+		Hawaii	L 53–65	11–14 (5–9)	RIMAC Arena (831); La Jolla, CA
February 24, 2022; 7:00 pm, ESPN+		at Long Beach State	L 87–103	11–15 (5–10)	Walter Pyramid (1,284); Long Beach, CA
February 26, 2022; 1:00 pm, Spectrum SportsNet/ESPN+		Cal State Fullerton	W 81–76	12–15 (6–10)	RIMAC Arena (808); La Jolla, CA
March 3, 2022; 7:00 pm, ESPN+		at Cal State Bakersfield	W 72–70	13–15 (7–10)	Icardo Center (1,207); Bakersfield, CA
March 5, 2022; 7:00 pm, ESPN+		at Cal Poly	L 76–80	13–16 (7–11)	Mott Athletics Center (1,642); San Luis Obispo, CA
*Non-conference game. ^{#}Rankings from AP Poll. (#) Tournament seedings in parentheses. All times are in Pacific Time Zone.
