= 2021–22 Hawaii Rainbow Warriors basketball team =

American college basketball season

2021–22 Hawaii Rainbow Warriors basketball

Las Vegas Classic runner-up
- Conference: Big West Conference
- Record: 17–11 (10–5 Big West)
- Head coach: Eran Ganot (7th season)
- Associate head coach: John Montgomery
- Assistant coaches: Brad Davidson; Mike Thomas
- Captains: Samuta Avea; Jerome Desrosiers; Kamaka Hepa
- Home arena: Stan Sheriff Center (Capacity: 10,300)

2021–22 Big West men's basketball standings
	Conf.				Overall
Team	W		L	PCT	W		L	PCT
Long Beach State	12	–	3	.800	20	–	13	.606
Cal State Fullerton †	11	–	4	.733	21	–	11	.656
Hawai'i	10	–	5	.667	17	–	11	.607
UC Irvine	9	–	5	.643	15	–	10	.600
UC Santa Barbara	8	–	5	.615	17	–	11	.607
UC Riverside	9	–	6	.600	16	–	12	.571
UC Davis	5	–	6	.455	13	–	11	.542
UC San Diego*	7	–	11	.389	13	–	16	.448
Cal State Northridge	3	–	13	.188	7	–	23	.233
Cal State Bakersfield	2	–	12	.143	8	–	19	.296
Cal Poly	2	–	12	.143	7	–	21	.250
† 2022 Big West tournament winner * ineligible for the 2022 NCAA tournament and 2022 Big West tournament due to transition period; Big West games not counted in standings

The 2021–22 Hawaii Rainbow Warriors basketball team represented the University of Hawaiʻi at Mānoa during the 2021–22 NCAA Division I men's basketball season. The Rainbow Warriors were led by seventh-year head coach Eran Ganot and played their games at the SimpliFi Arena at the Stan Sheriff Center as a member of the Big West Conference.

== Previous season ==
The Rainbow Warriors finished the 2020–21 season with a record of 11–10 (9–9 Big West), finishing the season sixth in the conference standings. They participated in the 2021 Big West Conference tournament as the sixth seed, losing to third seed UC Riverside by a score of 62–52.

== Departures ==
=== Players ===
Name	No.	Pos.	Height	Weight	Year	Hometown	Reason for departure
James Jean-Marie	1	F/C	6 ft 8 in (2.03 m)	230 lb (100 kg)	Senior	Montreal, Quebec	Transferred to Portland State
Justin Webster	2	G	6 ft 3 in (1.91 m)	180 lb (82 kg)	Sophomore	Dallas, Texas	Transferred to UNLV
Biwali Bayles	14	G	6 ft 1 in (1.85 m)	185 lb (84 kg)	Freshman	Redfern, New South Wales	Turned professional
Casdon Jardine	22	F	6 ft 7 in (2.01 m)	215 lb (98 kg)	Senior	Twin Falls, Idaho	Graduated
Manel Ayol	23	F	6 ft 7 in (2.01 m)	185 lb (84 kg)	Junior	Melbourne, Australia	Departed program
Justin Hemsley	42	G/F	6 ft 6 in (1.98 m)	195 pounds (88 kg)	Redshirt Junior	Rancho Cucamonga, California	Departed program
Kameron Ng	50	G	5 ft 11 in (1.80 m)	170 pounds (77 kg)	Sophomore	Kaneohe, Hawaii	Transferred to Hawaii–Hilo

=== Staff changes ===
Name	Position	Replacing	Reason for leaving
John Montgomery	Associate head coach	Position established	
Brad Davidson	Assistant coach	Chris Gerlufsen	Named associate head coach at San Francisco
Michael Thomas	Assistant coach	Jabari Trotter	Named assistant coach at Dartmouth
Dominic Drury	Director of basketball operations	Jesse Nakanishi	Undisclosed reasons
Gibson Johnson	Director of player development	Position established	

== Roster ==
2021–22 Hawaii Rainbow Warriors men's basketball team
Players
Coaches

Pos.	#	Name	Height	Weight	Year	Previous school	Hometown
G	0	Junior Madut	6 ft 6 in (1.98 m)	175 lb (79 kg)	Jr	Wyndham HS; Eastern Florida State	Sydney, Australia
G	1	Amoro Lado	6 ft 2 in (1.88 m)	175 lb (79 kg)	So	Vallivue HS; College of Southern Idaho	Nampa, Idaho
G	3	JoVon McClanahan	5 ft 10 in (1.78 m)	175 lb (79 kg)	So	Salesian College Prep; Sheridan College (WY)	Vallejo, California
G	4	Noel Coleman	6 ft 1 in (1.85 m)	175 lb (79 kg)	So	Sunrise Christian Academy; San Diego	Leopoldsburg, Belgium
F	5	Bernardo da Silva	6 ft 9 in (2.06 m)	210 lb (95 kg)	So	Wasatch Academy	Rio das Ostras, Brazil
G	10	Beon Riley	6 ft 6 in (1.98 m)	220 lb (100 kg)	Fr	Cathedral Catholic HS	Chula Vista, California
G	12	Jaka Prevodnik	6 ft 5 in (1.96 m)	195 lb (88 kg)	Fr	St. James (MD)	Kranj, Slovenia
F	20	Zoar Nedd	6 ft 6 in (1.98 m)	210 lb (95 kg)	So	Kapolei HS	Kapolei, Hawaii
F	22	Jerome Desrosiers (C)	6 ft 7 in (2.01 m)	235 lb (107 kg)	Sr	Northfield Mount Hermon School; Princeton	Saint-Hyacinthe, Quebec, Canada
F	24	Brock Heffner	6 ft 8 in (2.03 m)	215 lb (98 kg)	Fr	Grafton HS (WI)	Grafton, Wisconsin
G/F	32	Samuta Avea (injured) (C)	6 ft 6 in (1.98 m)	195 lb (88 kg)	Sr	Kahuku HS	Hauʻula, Hawaii
F	44	Kamaka Hepa (C)	6 ft 10 in (2.08 m)	215 lb (98 kg)	Jr	Jefferson HS (OR); Texas	Utqiagvik, Alaska
G	55	Juan Munoz (injured)	6 ft 0 in (1.83 m)	170 lb (77 kg)	Sr	Panther Creek HS (NC); Longwood	Morrisville, North Carolina

Head coach

- Eran Ganot (Swarthmore)

Assistant coach(es)

- John Montgomery (Loyola Marymount)
  Associate head coach
- Brad Davidson (Sydney)
- Mike Thomas (Hawaiʻi)

Support staff

- Dominic Drury (Saint Mary's)
  Director of Basketball Operations
- Gibson Johnson (Hawaiʻi)
  Director of player development
- Jason Dunne (Hartford)
  Graduate Manager

Strength and conditioning coach(es)

- Tanner Hull (Missouri)

Legend

- (C) Team captain
- (S) Suspended
- (I) Ineligible
- (W) Walk-on
- Injured
- Current redshirt

== Schedule ==
Date time, TV	Rank^{#}	Opponent^{#}	Result	Record	High points	High rebounds	High assists	Site city, state
Exhibition
November 1, 2021*; 7:00 p.m.		Chaminade	W 72–60		19 – Colina	12 – Colina	5 – Riley	Stan Sheriff Center (500); Honolulu, HI
Regular season
November 10, 2021*; 7:00 p.m., Spectrum Sports		Hawaii–Hilo; Outrigger Resorts Rainbow Classic	W 97–67	1–0	17 – Madut	10 – Da Silva	4 – Lado	Stan Sheriff Center (2,180); Honolulu, HI
November 11, 2021*; 7:00 p.m., Spectrum Sports		Northern Colorado; Outrigger Resorts Rainbow Classic	L 81–78	1–1	15 – Desrosiers	11 – Desrosiers	3 – Coleman	Stan Sheriff Center (2,110); Honolulu, HI
November 13, 2021*; 7:00 p.m., Spectrum Sports		Pacific; Outrigger Resorts Rainbow Classic	W 73–61	2–1	21 – Coleman	9 – da Silva	3 – Coleman	Stan Sheriff Center (2,276); Honolulu, HI
November 25, 2021*; 11:00 a.m.		vs. UIC; Las Vegas Classic	W 88–80	3–1	23 – Colina	7 – Colina	4 – Hepa	Orleans Arena; Paradise, NV
November 26, 2021*; 1:00 p.m.		vs. South Alabama; Las Vegas Classic Championship Game	L 72–69	3–2	18 – Madut	10 – Colina	7 – McClanahan	Orleans Arena; Paradise, NV
November 30, 2021*; 4:00 p.m.		at Santa Clara	L 70–58	3–3	13 – Colina	10 – Colina	9 – McClanahan	Leavey Center (1,093); Santa Clara, CA
December 8, 2021*; 7:00 p.m., Spectrum Sports		Hawaii Pacific	W 88–52	4–3	23 – Coleman	7 – Hepa	8 – McClanahan	Stan Sheriff Center (2,269); Honolulu, HI
December 22, 2021*; 7:00 p.m., ESPN2		vs. Vanderbilt; Diamond Head Classic Quarterfinals	L 54–68	4–4	31 – Coleman	7 – Desrosiers	3 – Hepa	Stan Sheriff Center (4,463); Honolulu, HI
December 23, 2021*; ESPN2		vs. South Florida; Diamond Head Classic Consolation round	L 69–76	4–5	22 – Coleman	4 – 2 Tied	3 – 2 Tied	Stan Sheriff Center (3,880); Honolulu, HI
December 25, 2021*; ESPNU		vs. Northern Iowa; Diamond Head Classic 7th place Game	Canceled due to COVID-19 protocols					Stan Sheriff Center; Honolulu, HI
December 30, 2021; 7:00 p.m., Spectrum Sports		UC Davis	Canceled due to COVID-19 protocols					Stan Sheriff Center; Honolulu, HI
January 1, 2022; 7:00 p.m., Spectrum Sports		UC Riverside	Canceled due to COVID-19 protocols					Stan Sheriff Center; Honolulu, HI
January 6, 2022; 5:00 p.m.		at Cal State Fullerton	Canceled due to COVID-19 protocols					Titan Gym; Fullerton, CA
January 8, 2022; 2:00 p.m., ESPN+		at Long Beach State	W 72–67	5–5 (1–0)	22 – Coleman	11 – Desrosiers	3 – 2 Tied	Walter Pyramid (762); Long Beach, CA
January 13, 2022; 7:00 p.m., Spectrum Sports		UC Irvine	W 72–56	6–5 (2–0)	16 – 2 Tied	12 – Da Silva	6 – McClanahan	Stan Sheriff Center (3,245); Honolulu, HI
January 15, 2022*; 7:00 p.m., Spectrum Sports		UC San Diego	W 79–56	7–5	18 – Desrosiers	13 – Desrosiers	6 – McClanahan	Stan Sheriff Center (3,376); Honolulu, HI
January 20, 2022; 5:00 p.m., ESPN+		at Cal State Bakersfield	W 63–59	8–5 (3–0)	17 – Madut	6 – Desrosiers	2 – 4 Tied	Icardo Center (788); Bakersfield, CA
January 22, 2022; 5:00 p.m., ESPN+		at Cal Poly	W 69–56	9–5 (4–0)	14 – Da Silva	8 – Da Silva	3 – Madut	Mott Athletics Center (1,371); San Luis Obispo, CA
January 27, 2022; 7:00 p.m., Spectrum Sports		Cal State Northridge	W 72–65	10–5 (5–0)	19 – Da Silva	9 – Da Silva	4 – Da Silva	Stan Sheriff Center (3,419); Honolulu, HI
January 29, 2022; 7:00 p.m., Spectrum Sports		UC Santa Barbara	W 65–62	11–5 (6–0)	16 – Madut	9 – Madut	4 – McClanahan	Stan Sheriff Center (3,735); Honolulu, HI
February 3, 2022; 6:00 p.m., ESPNU		at UC Riverside	L 59–64	11–6 (6–1)	12 – Hepa	7 – Hepa	4 – McClanahan	SRC Arena (1,117); Riverside, CA
February 5, 2022; 12:00 p.m., ESPN+		at UC Davis	L 65–68	11–7 (6–2)	16 – Hepa	9 – Hepa	3 – Madut	The Pavilion (1,102); Davis, CA
February 10, 2022; 7:00 p.m., ESPN+		Long Beach State	L 66–73	11–8 (6–3)	22 – Coleman	7 – Hepa	5 – Hepa	Stan Sheriff Center (3,767); Honolulu, HI
February 12, 2022; 7:00 p.m., ESPN2		Cal State Fullerton	W 72–55	12–8 (7–3)	24 – Coleman	10 – Madut	5 – Madut	Stan Sheriff Center (4,619); Honolulu, HI
February 17, 2022*; 5:00 p.m., ESPN+		at UC San Diego	W 65–53	13–8	16 – Madut	10 – Coleman	4 – Coleman	RIMAC Arena (831); La Jolla, CA
February 19, 2022; 11:00 a.m., ESPN+		at UC Irvine	L 52–77	13–9 (7–4)	12 – Colina	5 – Desrosiers	3 – McClanahan	Bren Events Center (1,529); Irvine, CA
February 24, 2022; 7:00 p.m., ESPN+		Cal Poly	W 63–54	14–9 (8–4)	14 – Desrosiers	6 – Riley	5 – McClanahan	Stan Sheriff Center (3,699); Honolulu, HI
February 26, 2022; 7:00 p.m., ESPN+		Cal State Bakersfield	W 62–50	15–9 (9–4)	14 – Da Silva	6 – Da Silva	6 – McClanahan	Stan Sheriff Center (4,660); Honolulu, HI
March 3, 2022; 5:00 p.m, ESPN+		at UC Santa Barbara	L 60–67	15–10 (9–5)	19 – Hepa	7 – Hepa	6 – McClanahan	Thunderdome (2,764); Santa Barbara, CA
March 5, 2022; 5:00 p.m., ESPN+		at Cal State Northridge	W 84–62	16–10 (10–5)	18 – Madut	7 – Hepa	5 – McClanahan	Matadome (615); Northridge, CA
Big West tournament
March 10, 2022; 8:30 p.m., ESPN+	(3)	vs. (6) UC Riverside; Quarterfinals	W 68–67	17–10	17 – Madut	12 – Desrosiers	4 – Desrosiers	Dollar Loan Center (N/A); Henderson, NV
March 11, 2022; 8:30 p.m., ESPNU	(3)	vs. (2) Cal State Fullerton; Semifinals	L 46–58	17–11	12 – Colina	10 – Madut	2 – McClanahan	Dollar Loan Center (N/A); Henderson, NV
*Non-conference game. ^{#}Rankings from AP Poll. (#) Tournament seedings in parentheses. All times are in Hawaii–Aleutian Time. Source:
