= 2021–22 UC Davis Aggies men's basketball team =

American college basketball season

2021–22 UC Davis Aggies men's basketball
- Conference: Big West Conference
- Record: 13–11 (5–6 Big West)
- Head coach: Jim Les (11th season)
- Associate head coach: Kyle Nosek
- Assistant coaches: Kyle Vogt; Jonathan Metzger-Jones
- Home arena: University Credit Union Center

2021–22 Big West men's basketball standings
	Conf.				Overall
Team	W		L	PCT	W		L	PCT
Long Beach State	12	–	3	.800	20	–	13	.606
Cal State Fullerton †	11	–	4	.733	21	–	11	.656
Hawai'i	10	–	5	.667	17	–	11	.607
UC Irvine	9	–	5	.643	15	–	10	.600
UC Santa Barbara	8	–	5	.615	17	–	11	.607
UC Riverside	9	–	6	.600	16	–	12	.571
UC Davis	5	–	6	.455	13	–	11	.542
UC San Diego*	7	–	11	.389	13	–	16	.448
Cal State Northridge	3	–	13	.188	7	–	23	.233
Cal State Bakersfield	2	–	12	.143	8	–	19	.296
Cal Poly	2	–	12	.143	7	–	21	.250
† 2022 Big West tournament winner * ineligible for the 2022 NCAA tournament and 2022 Big West tournament due to transition period; Big West games not counted in standings

The 2021–22 UC Davis Aggies men's basketball team represented the University of California, Davis in the 2021–22 NCAA Division I men's basketball season. The Aggies, led by 10th-year head coach Jim Les, played their home games at the University Credit Union Center in Davis, California as members of the Big West Conference.

The Aggies finished the season 13–11, 5–6 in Big West play, to finish in seventh place. They defeated Cal Poly in the first round of the Big West tournament before falling to eventual tournament champion Cal State Fullerton in the quarterfinals.

== Previous season ==
In a season limited due to the ongoing COVID-19 pandemic, the Aggies finished the 2020–21 season 10–8, 6–4 in Big West play, to finish in fourth place. In the Big West tournament, they defeated Cal State Bakersfield in the quarterfinals before falling to top-seeded UC Santa Barbara in the semifinals.

== Roster ==
2021–22 UC Davis Aggies men's basketball team
Players
Coaches

Pos.	#	Name	Height	Weight	Year	Previous school	Hometown
G	0	Kane Milling	6 ft 4 in (1.93 m)	180 lb (82 kg)	So	Nevada	Nantes, France
F	1	Patrick Lambey	6 ft 5 in (1.96 m)	190 lb (86 kg)	Jr	Yuba College	Granite Bay, CA
F	2	Caleb McGill	6 ft 8 in (2.03 m)	215 lb (98 kg)	Fr	Grandview HS	Aurora, CO
F	3	Aaron Murphy	6 ft 6 in (1.98 m)	225 lb (102 kg)	RS Fr	Modesto Christian	Modesto, CA
F	4	Christian Anigwe	6 ft 9 in (2.06 m)	220 lb (100 kg)	Jr	San Jose State	Phoenix, AZ
G	5	Ezra Manjon	5 ft 11 in (1.8 m)	170 lb (77 kg)	Jr	Heritage HS	Antioch, CA
G	10	Leo DeBruhl	6 ft 2 in (1.88 m)	190 lb (86 kg)	Fr	Seattle Academy	Seattle, WA
G	11	Caleb Fuller	6 ft 5 in (1.96 m)	210 lb (95 kg)	Jr	Barking Abbey	Ipswich, England
G	20	B.J. Shaw	6 ft 6 in (1.98 m)	195 lb (88 kg)	So	Brewster Academy	Oakland, CA
G	22	Sione Lose	6 ft 4 in (1.93 m)	170 lb (77 kg)	Fr	Capital Christian HS	Sacramento, CA
G	23	Cameron Niles	6 ft 5 in (1.96 m)	195 lb (88 kg)	Fr	Del Campo HS	Fair Oaks, CA
G	24	Ade Adebayo	6 ft 5 in (1.96 m)	205 lb (93 kg)	So	Barking Abbey	London, England
G	30	Cameron Ba	6 ft 3 in (1.91 m)	180 lb (82 kg)	So	St. Joseph Notre Dame HS	Alameda, CA
G	40	Elijah Pepper	6 ft 4 in (1.93 m)	200 lb (91 kg)	So	Selah HS	Selah, WA
F	55	Francesco Borra	6 ft 11 in (2.11 m)	255 lb (116 kg)	Fr	JSerra Catholic HS	Moncalieri, Italy

Head coach

- Jim Les (Bradley)

Assistant coach(es)

- Kevin Nosek (UC Davis)
- Kyle Vogt (Lakeland)
- Jonathan Metzger-Jones (Pacific)

Legend

- (C) Team captain
- (S) Suspended
- (I) Ineligible
- (W) Walk-on
- Injured
- Current redshirt

Roster
Last update: November 7, 2021

== Schedule and results ==
Date time, TV	Rank^{#}	Opponent^{#}	Result	Record	Site (attendance) city, state
Exhibition
October 30, 2021*; 7:30 p.m.		at William Jessup; Dixie Fire Benefit Game	W 74–64		Warrior Arena; Rocklin, CA
Non-conference regular season
November 9, 2021*; 6:30 p.m.		at Utah State	W 72–69	1–0	Smith Spectrum (6,554); Logan, UT
November 12, 2021*; 2:00 p.m., ESPN+		Eastern Washington	W 84–76	2–0	University Credit Union Center (950); Davis, CA
November 17, 2021*; 7:00 p.m.		at Pepperdine	L 67–72	2–1	Firestone Fieldhouse (490); Malibu, CA
November 23, 2021*; 7:30 p.m.		vs. Sacramento State	L 63–75	2–2	Golden 1 Center (1,507); Sacramento, CA
November 28, 2021*; 2:00 p.m., ESPN+		Academy of Art	L 60–79	2–3	University Credit Union Center (316); Davis, CA
December 1, 2021*; 6:00 p.m., ESPN+		Pacific	W 63–57	3–3	University Credit Union Center (595); Davis, CA
December 4, 2021*; 2:00 p.m., ESPN+		UC Merced	W 81–40	4–3	University Credit Union Center; Davis, CA
December 14, 2021*; 7:00 p.m., P12N		at Oregon State	W 71–64	5–3	Gill Coliseum (2,954); Corvallis, OR
December 19, 2021*; 12:00 p.m.		at Pacific	W 77–67	6–3	Alex G. Spanos Center (968); Stockton, CA
December 22, 2021*; 2:00 p.m., ESPN+		Portland	L 60–65	6–4	University Credit Union Center (574); Davis, CA
Big West regular season
December 28, 2021; 6:00 p.m., ESPN+		UC Riverside	Canceled due to COVID-19 protocols		University Credit Union Center; Davis, CA
December 30, 2021; 10:00 p.m., SPECTSN		at Hawaii	Canceled due to COVID-19 protocols		Stan Sheriff Center; Honolulu, HI
January 6, 2022; 6:00 p.m., ESPN+		UC Irvine	Canceled due to COVID-19 protocols		University Credit Union Center; Davis, CA
January 8, 2022*; 5:00 p.m., ESPN+		UC San Diego	W 78–71	7–4	University Credit Union Center (0); Davis, CA
January 13, 2022; 7:00 p.m., ESPN+		at Cal State Bakersfield	Canceled due to COVID-19 protocols		Icardo Center; Bakersfield, CA
January 15, 2022; 7:00 p.m., ESPN+		at Cal Poly	L 74–82	7–5 (0–1)	Mott Athletics Center (1,862); San Luis Obispo, CA
January 20, 2022; 7:00 p.m., ESPN+		at CSUN	W 64–47	8–5 (1–1)	Matadome (104); Northridge, CA
January 22, 2022; 7:00 p.m., ESPN+		at UC Santa Barbara	Canceled due to COVID-19 protocols		The Thunderdome; Santa Barbara, CA
January 27, 2022; 6:00 p.m., ESPN+		Cal State Fullerton	L 58–74	8–6 (1–2)	University Credit Union Center (579); Davis, CA
January 29, 2022; 5:00 p.m., ESPN+		Long Beach State	L 63–70	8–7 (1–3)	University Credit Union Center (707); Davis, CA
February 1, 2022; 7:00 p.m., ESPN+		at UC Riverside	W 65–60	9–7 (2–3)	SRC Arena (415); Riverside, CA
February 5, 2022; 5:00 p.m., ESPN+		Hawaii	W 68–65	10–7 (3–3)	University Credit Union Center (1,102); Davis, CA
February 10, 2022*; 7:00 p.m., ESPN+		at UC San Diego	Canceled due to COVID-19 protocols		RIMAC Arena; La Jolla, CA
February 12, 2022; 6:00 p.m., ESPN+		at UC Irvine	Canceled due to COVID-19 protocols		Bren Events Center; Irvine, CA
February 17, 2022; 6:00 p.m., ESPN+		Cal Poly	Canceled due to COVID-19 protocols		University Credit Union Center; Davis, CA
February 19, 2022; 5:00 p.m., ESPN+		Cal State Bakersfield	W 81–79	11–7 (4–3)	University Credit Union Center (1,004); Davis, CA
February 24, 2022; 6:00 p.m., ESPN+		UC Santa Barbara	L 69–76 ^{OT}	11–8 (4–4)	University Credit Union Center (1,383); Davis, CA
February 26, 2022; 5:00 p.m., ESPN+		CSUN	W 68–49	12–8 (5–4)	University Credit Union Center (1,549); Davis, CA
March 3, 2022; 7:00 p.m., ESPN+		at Long Beach State	L 65–68	12–9 (5–5)	Walter Pyramid (1,444); Long Beach, CA
March 5, 2022; 6:00 p.m., ESPN+		at Cal State Fullerton	L 59–62	12–10 (5–6)	Titan Gym (760); Fullerton, CA
Big West tournament
March 8, 2022; 8:30 p.m., ESPN+	(7)	vs. (10) Cal Poly; First round	W 63–53	13–10	Dollar Loan Center; Henderson, NV
March 9, 2022; 6:00 p.m., ESPN+	(7)	vs. (2) Cal State Fullerton; Quarterfinals	L 55—73	13–11	Dollar Loan Center; Henderson, NV
*Non-conference game. ^{#}Rankings from AP poll. (#) Tournament seedings in parentheses. All times are in Pacific.
