= 2021–22 Long Beach State Beach men's basketball team =

American college basketball season

2021–22 Long Beach State Beach men's basketball

Big West regular season champions

NIT, First Round
- Conference: Big West Conference
- Record: 20–13 (12–3 Big West)
- Head coach: Dan Monson (15th season)
- Associate head coach: Myke Scholl
- Assistant coaches: Senque Carey; Allen Caveness
- Home arena: Walter Pyramid (Capacity: 4,200)

2021–22 Big West men's basketball standings
| | Conf. | | | | Overall |
| Team | W | | L | PCT | W | | L | PCT |
|---|---|---|---|---|---|---|---|---|
| Long Beach State | 12 | – | 3 | .800 | 20 | – | 13 | .606 |
| Cal State Fullerton † | 11 | – | 4 | .733 | 21 | – | 11 | .656 |
| Hawai'i | 10 | – | 5 | .667 | 17 | – | 11 | .607 |
| UC Irvine | 9 | – | 5 | .643 | 15 | – | 10 | .600 |
| UC Santa Barbara | 8 | – | 5 | .615 | 17 | – | 11 | .607 |
| UC Riverside | 9 | – | 6 | .600 | 16 | – | 12 | .571 |
| UC Davis | 5 | – | 6 | .455 | 13 | – | 11 | .542 |
| UC San Diego* | 7 | – | 11 | .389 | 13 | – | 16 | .448 |
| Cal State Northridge | 3 | – | 13 | .188 | 7 | – | 23 | .233 |
| Cal State Bakersfield | 2 | – | 12 | .143 | 8 | – | 19 | .296 |
| Cal Poly | 2 | – | 12 | .143 | 7 | – | 21 | .250 |
† 2022 Big West tournament winner * ineligible for the 2022 NCAA tournament and 2022 Big West tournament due to transition period; Big West games not counted in standings

The 2021–22 Long Beach State Beach men's basketball team represented California State University, Long Beach in the 2021–22 NCAA Division I men's basketball season. The Beach were led by 15th-year head coach Dan Monson and played their home games at the Walter Pyramid as members of the Big West Conference. They finished the regular season 20–12, 12–3 in Big West play to win the regular season championship, the school's first since 2013 and fourth overall under Monson. They defeated Cal State Bakersfield and UC Santa Barbara to advance to the championship game of the Big West tournament where they lost to Cal State Fullerton. As a regular season champion that did not win its conference tournament, they received an automatic bid to the National Invitation Tournament, losing in the first round at BYU.

== Previous season ==
In a season limited due to the ongoing COVID-19 pandemic, the Beach finished the season 6–12, 4–8 in Big West play to finish in ninth place. They defeated Cal State Northridge in the first round of the Big West tournament before losing to UC Santa Barbara in the quarterfinals.

== Roster ==
2021–22 Long Beach State Beach men's basketball team
Players
Coaches

| Pos. | # | Name | Height | Weight | Year | Previous school | Hometown |
|---|---|---|---|---|---|---|---|
| G | 0 | RJ Rhoden | 6 ft 3 in (1.91 m) | 195 lb (88 kg) | RS Fr | Mainland HS | Daytona Beach, FL |
| F | 2 | Jordan Roberts | 6 ft 9 in (2.06 m) | 200 lb (91 kg) | Sr | Ridgeview HS | Bakersfield, CA |
| G | 3 | Drew Cobb | 6 ft 4 in (1.93 m) | 205 lb (93 kg) | Sr | Fresno City College | Sacramento, CA |
| G | 5 | Eddie Scott | 6 ft 6 in (1.98 m) | 210 lb (95 kg) | Jr | Penn | Bowie, MD |
| F | 10 | AJ George | 6 ft 6 in (1.98 m) | 190 lb (86 kg) | Fr | Hoover HS | Fresno, CA |
| G | 11 | Joel Murray | 6 ft 0 in (1.83 m) | 170 lb (77 kg) | Jr | West Texas A&M | Rowlett, TX |
| G | 12 | Jadon Jones | 6 ft 5 in (1.96 m) | 170 lb (77 kg) | Fr | St. Anthony HS | Long Beach, CA |
| F | 13 | Romelle Mansel | 6 ft 9 in (2.06 m) | 230 lb (104 kg) | So | St. Bernard HS | Playa del Rey, CA |
| G | 14 | Colin Slater | 6 ft 1 in (1.85 m) | 190 lb (86 kg) | Sr | Tulane | New Orleans, LA |
| G | 22 | AJ Neal | 6 ft 1 in (1.85 m) | 180 lb (82 kg) | Fr | West Oaks Academy | Orlando, FL |
| F | 24 | Joe Hampton | 6 ft 8 in (2.03 m) | 235 lb (107 kg) | Sr | East LA CC | Washington, D.C. |
| G | 25 | Aboubacar Traoré | 6 ft 5 in (1.96 m) | 190 lb (86 kg) | Fr | LaBASE Academy | Abidjan, Côte d'Ivoire |
| F | 31 | Tobias Rotegård | 6 ft 7 in (2.01 m) | 200 lb (91 kg) | Fr | UAB | Kongsberg, Norway |
| C | 32 | Trever Irish | 7 ft 0 in (2.13 m) | 230 lb (104 kg) | Jr | Central Arizona CC | Lewiston, ME |
| F | 35 | Raymond Hawkins III | 6 ft 9 in (2.06 m) | 240 lb (109 kg) | So | Alabama | East Oakland, CA |
| C | 40 | Jeffrey Yan | 6 ft 9 in (2.06 m) | 275 lb (125 kg) | So | Capistrano Valley Christian School | Shanghai, China |

Head coach

- Dan Monson (Idaho)

Assistant coach(es)

- Myke Scholl (Loyola Marymount)
- Senque Carey (New Mexico)
- Allen Caveness (Saint Mary's)

Legend

- (C) Team captain
- (S) Suspended
- (I) Ineligible
- (W) Walk-on
- Injured
- Current redshirt

Roster
Last update: November 27, 2021

== Schedule and results ==
On December 8, 2021, freshman Aboubacar Traoré posted 20 rebounds in a 102–69 non-conference win over Bethesda of the NCCAA, thus becoming the first LBSU player with that many boards in a single game since 1983.

| Date time, TV | Rank^{#} | Opponent^{#} | Result | Record | High points | High rebounds | High assists | Site (attendance) city, state |
Exhibition
| November 5, 2021*; 6:00pm, ESPN+ | | Biola | W 82–65 | – | 17 – Slater | 9 – Hampton | 2 – Tied | Walter Pyramid (1,436); Long Beach, CA |
Non-conference regular season
| November 10, 2021*; 6:00pm, ESPN+ | | at Idaho | W 95–89 ^{OT} | 1–0 | 28 – Murray | 10 – Roberts | 5 – Hampton | ICCU Arena (1,723); Moscow, ID |
| November 15, 2021*; 8:00pm, P12N | | at No. 2 UCLA | L 79–100 | 1–1 | 30 – Murray | 7 – Traoré | 3 – Tied | Pauley Pavilion (7,129); Los Angeles, CA |
| November 17, 2021*; 7:00pm, ESPN+ | | Utah Valley | L 78–84 ^{OT} | 1–2 | 18 – Murray | 6 – Mansel | 3 – Tied | Walter Pyramid (1,126); Long Beach, CA |
| November 22, 2021*; 5:00pm | | vs. Missouri State; Naples Invitational 1st round | L 66–92 | 1–3 | 15 – Hampton | 7 – Traoré | 4 – Murray | CSN Fieldhouse (378); Naples, FL |
| November 23, 2021*; 11:30am | | vs. Murray State; Naples Invitational consolation 2nd round | L 43–80 | 1–4 | 14 – Murray | 5 – Tied | 2 – Tied | CSN Fieldhouse (307); Naples, FL |
| November 24, 2021*; 9:00am | | vs. Wright State; Naples Invitational 7th-place game | W 85–76 | 2–4 | 22 – Hampton | 10 – Hampton | 5 – Murray | CSN Fieldhouse (107); Naples, FL |
| November 30, 2021*; 7:00pm, Stadium | | at San Diego State | L 47–72 | 2–5 | 8 – Slater | 7 – Traoré | 2 – Tied | Viejas Arena (11,917); San Diego, CA |
| December 4, 2021*; 4:00pm, ESPN+ | | Loyola Marymount | L 74–77 | 2–6 | 19 – Murray | 8 – Roberts | 3 – Tied | Walter Pyramid (1,429); Long Beach, CA |
| December 8, 2021*; 7:00pm, ESPN+ | | Bethesda | W 102–69 | 3–6 | 21 – Slater | 20 – Traoré | 7 – Slater | Walter Pyramid (1,032); Long Beach, CA |
| December 12, 2021*; 2:00pm, P12N | | at No. 16 USC | L 62–73 | 3–7 | 14 – Murray | 8 – Traoré | 3 – Murray | Galen Center (5,561); Los Angeles, CA |
| December 18, 2021*; 6:00pm, ESPN+ | | La Sierra | Canceled due to COVID-19 protocols | | | | | Walter Pyramid; Long Beach, CA |
| December 20, 2021*; 7:00pm | | at San Diego | Canceled due to COVID-19 protocols | | | | | Jenny Craig Pavilion; San Diego, CA |
| December 28, 2021*; 6:00pm, ESPN+ | | Hope International | Canceled due to COVID-19 protocols | | | | | Walter Pyramid; Long Beach, CA |
Big West regular season
| December 30, 2021; 7:00pm, ESPN+ | | at Cal Poly | Canceled due to COVID-19 protocols | | | | | Mott Athletics Center; San Luis Obispo, CA |
| January 1, 2022; 7:00pm, ESPN+ | | at Cal State Bakersfield | Canceled due to COVID-19 protocols | | | | | Icardo Center; Bakersfield, CA |
| January 4, 2022; 7:00pm, ESPN+ | | at Cal State Fullerton | Canceled due to COVID-19 protocols | | | | | Titan Gym; Fullerton, CA |
| January 5, 2021; 7:00pm, ESPN+ | | Westcliff | W 90–64 | 4–7 | 23 – Slater | 9 – Traore | 3 – Tied | Walter Pyramid (402); Long Beach, CA |
| January 6, 2021; 4:30pm, P12N | | at No. 5 UCLA | L 78–96 | 4–8 | 27 – Jones | 8 – Roberts | 2 – Tied | Pauley Pavilion (236); Los Angeles, CA |
| January 8, 2021; 4:00pm, ESPN+ | | Hawaiʻi | L 67–72 | 4–9 (0–1) | 16 – Slater | 10 – Traore | 4 – Cobb | Walter Pyramid (762); Long Beach, CA |
| January 13, 2022; 7:00pm, ESPN+ | | UC Santa Barbara | W 65–58 | 5–9 (1–1) | 17 – Traore | 7 – Traore | 4 – Slater | Walter Pyramid (812); Long Beach, CA |
| January 15, 2022; 4:00pm, ESPN+ | | CSUN | W 71–55 | 6–9 (2–1) | 16 – Murray | 16 – Traore | 7 – Slater | Walter Pyramid (1,017); Long Beach, CA |
| January 20, 2022*; 7:00pm, ESPN+ | | at UC San Diego | W 87–69 | 7–9 | 20 – Slater | 9 – Traore | 3 – Slater | RIMAC Arena (0); La Jolla, CA |
| January 22, 2022; 4:00pm, ESPN+ | | UC Irvine | W 73–67 | 8–9 (3–1) | 24 – Murray | 7 – Traore | 3 – Murray | Walter Pyramid (982); Long Beach, CA |
| January 27, 2022; 7:00pm, ESPN+ | | at UC Riverside | W 68–62 | 9–9 (4–1) | 16 – Slater | 23 – Traore | 5 – Murray | SRC Arena (0); Riverside, CA |
| January 29, 2022; 2:00pm, ESPN+ | | at UC Davis | W 70–63 | 10–9 (5–1) | 19 – Murray | 7 – Roberts | 4 – Slater | University Credit Union Center (0); Davis, CA |
| February 3, 2022; 7:00pm, ESPN+ | | Cal State Bakersfield | W 74–65 | 11–9 (6–1) | 23 – Slater | 10 – Traore | 5 – Murray | Walter Pyramid (925); Long Beach, CA |
| February 5, 2022; 4:00pm, ESPN+ | | Cal Poly | W 78–65 | 12–9 (7–1) | 25 – Murray | 7 – Traore | 3 – Traore | Walter Pyramid (1,062); Long Beach, CA |
| February 8, 2022; 7:00pm, ESPN+ | | Cal State Fullerton | W 71–61 | 13–9 (8–1) | 19 – Slater | 9 – Traore | 4 – Slater | Walter Pyramid (2,025); Long Beach, CA |
| February 10, 2022; 9:00pm, ESPN+ | | at Hawaiʻi | W 73–66 | 14–9 (9–1) | 18 – Traore | 11 – Traore | 3 – Mansel | Stan Sheriff Center (3,767); Honolulu, HI |
| February 17, 2022; 7:00pm, ESPN+ | | at CSUN | W 72–59 | 15–9 (10–1) | 25 – Jones | 6 – Mansel | 5 – Traore | Matadome (515); Northridge, CA |
| February 19, 2022; 7:00pm, ESPN+ | | at UC Santa Barbara | L 71–84 | 15–10 (10–2) | 28 – Slater | 10 – Traore | 6 – Murray | The Thunderdome (1,342); Santa Barbara, CA |
| February 24, 2022*; 7:00pm, ESPN+ | | UC San Diego | W 103–87 | 16–10 | 27 – Murray | 8 – Tied | 6 – Tied | Walter Pyramid (1,284); Long Beach, CA |
| February 26, 2022; 9:00pm, ESPNU | | at UC Irvine | L 72–77 | 16–11 (10–3) | 20 – Murray | 9 – Jones | 7 – Slater | Bren Events Center (2,480); Irvine, CA |
| March 3, 2022; 7:00pm, ESPN+ | | UC Davis | W 68–65 | 17–11 (11–3) | 21 – Jones | 14 – Traore | 4 – Traore | Walter Pyramid (1,444); Long Beach, CA |
| March 5, 2022; 4:00pm, ESPN+ | | UC Riverside | W 73–72 ^{OT} | 18–11 (12–3) | 26 – Murray | 9 – Traore | 4 – Slater | Walter Pyramid (1,824); Long Beach, CA |
Big West tournament
| March 10, 2022; 12:00 pm, ESPN+ | (1) | vs. (9) Cal State Bakersfield; Quarterfinals | W 72–61 | 19–11 | 25 – Murray | 9 – Traoré | 4 – Tied | Dollar Loan Center; Henderson, NV |
| March 11, 2022; 6:00 pm, ESPN+ | (1) | vs. (5) UC Santa Barbara; Semifinals | W 67–64 | 20–11 | 30 – Slater | 9 – Traoré | 4 – Cobb | Dollar Loan Center; Henderson, NV |
| March 12, 2022; 8:30 pm, ESPN2 | (1) | vs. (2) Cal State Fullerton; Championship | L 71–72 | 20–12 | 24 – Murray | 7 – Tied | 4 – Tied | Dollar Loan Center; Henderson, NV |
NIT
| March 16, 2022*; 6:00 pm, ESPN+ | | at (2) BYU; First Round – SMU Bracket | L 72–93 | 20–13 | 24 – Murray | 7 – Jones | 2 – Murray | Marriott Center (5,511); Provo, UT |
*Non-conference game. ^{#}Rankings from AP Poll. (#) Tournament seedings in parentheses. All times are in Pacific.
