= 2021–22 UC Riverside Highlanders men's basketball team =

American college basketball season

2021–22 UC Riverside Highlanders men's basketball
- Conference: Big West Conference
- Record: 16–12 (9–6 Big West)
- Head coach: Mike Magpayo (2nd season)
- Associate head coach: Michael Czepil (4th season)
- Assistant coaches: Michael Lecak (3rd season); Rob Jones (1st season)
- Home arena: SRC Arena (Capacity: 3,168)

2021–22 Big West men's basketball standings
	Conf.				Overall
Team	W		L	PCT	W		L	PCT
Long Beach State	12	–	3	.800	20	–	13	.606
Cal State Fullerton †	11	–	4	.733	21	–	11	.656
Hawai'i	10	–	5	.667	17	–	11	.607
UC Irvine	9	–	5	.643	15	–	10	.600
UC Santa Barbara	8	–	5	.615	17	–	11	.607
UC Riverside	9	–	6	.600	16	–	12	.571
UC Davis	5	–	6	.455	13	–	11	.542
UC San Diego*	7	–	11	.389	13	–	16	.448
Cal State Northridge	3	–	13	.188	7	–	23	.233
Cal State Bakersfield	2	–	12	.143	8	–	19	.296
Cal Poly	2	–	12	.143	7	–	21	.250
† 2022 Big West tournament winner * ineligible for the 2022 NCAA tournament and 2022 Big West tournament due to transition period; Big West games not counted in standings

The 2021–22 UC Riverside Highlanders men's basketball team represented the University of California, Riverside in the 2021–22 NCAA Division I men's basketball season. The Highlanders, led by second-year head coach Mike Magpayo, played their home games at the on-campus Student Recreation Center Arena (Note: The arena is part of a larger athletics complex called the UC Riverside Student Recreation Center, commonly known as "The SRC".) in Riverside, California as members of the Big West Conference.

== Previous season ==
The Highlanders finished 14–8, including an 8–4 record in conference play, during Magpayo's first season at the helm in 2020–21. After finishing third in the regular-season Big West Conference standings, the Highlanders defeated Hawaii in the quarterfinals of the Big West tournament before being eliminated in the semifinals by UC Irvine. The Highlanders' .636 winning percentage on the season was their best single-season mark since the program transitioned to Division I in 2001.

== Preseason ==
Prior to the season, the future of the men's basketball program was placed into doubt, as UC Riverside's leadership were considering cutting the university's entire athletics department in response to financial strain caused by the COVID-19 pandemic. However, in May 2021, the university announced that they had decided against eliminating athletics and would continue competing at the NCAA Division I level in all sports, thus saving the men's basketball program from extinction.

== Roster ==
For the second straight season, over half of UC Riverside's roster consists of players who are from either Australia or New Zealand.

2021–22 UC Riverside Highlanders men's basketball team
Players
Coaches

Pos.	#	Name	Height	Weight	Year	Previous school	Hometown
G	0	Dragan Elkaz	6 ft 5 in (1.96 m)	205 lb (93 kg)	Sr	Westfields Sports HS	Green Valley, Australia
F	1	J. P. II Moorman	6 ft 7 in (2.01 m)	210 lb (95 kg)	Sr	Temple	Greensboro, NC
G	2	Quinton Ford	6 ft 3 in (1.91 m)	190 lb (86 kg)	RS So	Copperas Cove HS	Copperas Cove, TX
G	3	Kobe Jerome	6 ft 4 in (1.93 m)	190 lb (86 kg)	Fr	Blue Ridge School	New Rochelle, NY
F	4	Daniel Mading	6 ft 9 in (2.06 m)	210 lb (95 kg)	Sr	San Jacinto CC	Perth, Australia
G	5	Zyon Pullin	6 ft 4 in (1.93 m)	205 lb (93 kg)	Jr	College Park HS	Pleasant Hill, CA
G	10	Jeffrey Ofoedu	6 ft 5 in (1.96 m)	210 lb (95 kg)	Fr	Suzanne Cory HS	Melbourne, Australia
G	11	Flynn Cameron	6 ft 5 in (1.96 m)	205 lb (93 kg)	RS Jr	DePaul	Auckland, New Zealand
C	12	Jhaylon Martinez	6 ft 11 in (2.11 m)	260 lb (118 kg)	RS Fr	UNLV	Vallejo, CA
G	14	Wil Tattersall	6 ft 7 in (2.01 m)	210 lb (95 kg)	So	Center of Excellence	Melbourne, Australia
G	22	Dominick Pickett (W)	6 ft 4 in (1.93 m)	195 lb (88 kg)	GS	Rancho Verde HS	Moreno Valley, CA
F	23	Angus McWilliam	6 ft 10 in (2.08 m)	240 lb (109 kg)	RS Jr	TCU	Christchurch, New Zealand
G	24	Jaylen Cross	6 ft 4 in (1.93 m)	185 lb (84 kg)	So	Culver City HS	Melbourne, Australia
C	25	Callum McRae	7 ft 1 in (2.16 m)	295 lb (134 kg)	RS Jr	Palmerston North Boys' HS	Palmerston North, New Zealand
G/F	40	Niyi Olabode	6 ft 5 in (1.96 m)	—	Fr	Miramonte HS	Orinda, CA

Head coach

- Mike Magpayo (UC Santa Barbara)

Assistant coach(es)

- Michael Czepil (Nicholls State)
- Michael Lecak (Pittsburgh)
- Rob Jones (Saint Mary's)

Legend

- (C) Team captain
- (S) Suspended
- (I) Ineligible
- (W) Walk-on
- Injured
- Current redshirt

Roster
Last update: December 12, 2021

== Schedule and results ==
On November 11, the Highlanders upset Pac-12 school Arizona State on the road, 66–65. As time expired in the game, forward J. P. Moorman II sank a buzzer-beating three-pointer from past half-court to stun the Sun Devils in what a USA Today opinion piece called "one of college basketball's shining moments" and "perhaps the shot of the year".

Date time, TV	Rank^{#}	Opponent^{#}	Result	Record	High points	High rebounds	High assists	Site (attendance) city, state
Exhibition
October 30, 2021*; 2:00 p.m.		Cal State Los Angeles	W 90–56	–	17 – Pullin	11 – Pullin	9 – Pullin	SRC Arena (247); Riverside, CA
Non-conference regular season
November 9, 2021*; 7:00 p.m., YurView		at San Diego State	L 53–66	0–1	13 – McRae	5 – 2 tied	4 – 2 tied	Viejas Arena (11,729); San Diego, CA
November 11, 2021*; 5:30 p.m., P12N		at Arizona State	W 66–65	1–1	18 – Cameron	11 – Moorman II	8 – Pullin	Desert Financial Arena (7,594); Tempe, AZ
November 14, 2021*; 2:00 p.m., ESPN+		La Sierra	W 72–54	2–1	18 – Tattersall	12 – McRae	5 – Pullin	SRC Arena (285); Riverside, CA
November 17, 2021*; 7:30 p.m., WCC Network		at San Diego	L 62–74	2–2	20 – Pullin	10 – Pullin	4 – McRae	Jenny Craig Pavilion (958); San Diego, CA
November 20, 2021*; 4:00 p.m., ESPN+		Bethesda; Homecoming	W 95–57	3–2	18 – 2 tied	11 – Martinez	8 – Pullin	SRC Arena (577); Riverside, CA
November 22, 2021*; 6:00 p.m., CUSA.tv		at UTEP; Golden Turkey Classic	W 52–40	4–2	14 – Moorman II	10 – McRae	2 – 3 tied	Don Haskins Center (4,037); El Paso, TX
November 26, 2021*; 2:00 p.m., ESPN+		Florida A&M; Golden Turkey Classic	W 60–49	5–2	17 – Pullin	16 – McRae	5 – Pullin	SRC Arena (212); Riverside, CA
November 29, 2021*; 7:00 p.m., WCC Network		at Saint Mary's	L 50–67	5–3	12 – Pullin	6 – Pullin	3 – Pullin	University Credit Union Pavilion (2,594); Moraga, CA
December 1, 2021*; 7:00 p.m., P12N		at Oregon	L 65–71	5–4	15 – Pickett	7 – Pullin	5 – Pullin	Matthew Knight Arena (5,739); Eugene, OR
December 12, 2021*; 4:00 p.m., ESPN+		Cal Baptist	W 70–54	6–4	19 – Moorman II	14 – McRae	5 – Pullin	SRC Arena (884); Riverside, CA
December 19, 2021*; 2:00 p.m., ESPN+		Sacramento State	Canceled due to COVID-19 protocols					SRC Arena; Riverside, CA
December 22, 2021*; 11:00 a.m., ESPN+		Idaho	Canceled due to COVID-19 protocols					SRC Arena; Riverside, CA
Big West regular season
December 28, 2021; 6:00 p.m., ESPN+		at UC Davis	Canceled due to COVID-19 protocols					University Credit Union Center; Davis, CA
January 1, 2022; 10:00 p.m., ESPN+		at Hawaii	Canceled due to COVID-19 protocols					Stan Sheriff Center; Honolulu, HI
January 6, 2022*; 7:00 p.m., ESPN+		UC San Diego	W 59–51	7–4	13 – Cameron	12 – Pickett	3 – Pickett	SRC Arena (0); Riverside, CA
January 8, 2022; 5:00 p.m., ESPN+		UC Irvine	L 51–68	7–5 (0–1)	16 – Moorman II	6 – McRae	5 – McRae	SRC Arena (0); Riverside, CA
January 13, 2022; 7:00 p.m., ESPN+		at Cal Poly	W 57–46	8–5 (1–1)	13 – Pullin	8 – Cameron	4 – Pullin	Mott Athletics Center (1,263); San Luis Obispo, CA
January 15, 2022; 7:00 p.m., ESPN+		at Cal State Bakersfield	W 65–64	9–5 (2–1)	18 – Pickett	10 – McRae	5 – Pickett	Icardo Center (486); Bakersfield, CA
January 20, 2022; 7:00 p.m., ESPN+		at UC Santa Barbara	Canceled due to COVID-19 protocols					The Thunderdome; Santa Barbara, CA
January 22, 2022; 7:00 p.m., ESPN+		at CSUN	W 77–67	10–5 (3–1)	22 – Tattersall	7 – Pullin	8 – Pullin	Matadome (0); Northridge, CA
January 27, 2022; 7:00 p.m., ESPN+		Long Beach State	L 62–68	10–6 (3–2)	23 – Pullin	11 – McRae	5 – Pullin	SRC Arena (0); Riverside, CA
January 29, 2022; 5:00 p.m., ESPN+		Cal State Fullerton	W 67–54	11–6 (4–2)	18 – Pickett	8 – McRae	3 – Pullin	SRC Arena (0); Riverside, CA
February 1, 2022; 7:00 p.m., ESPN+		UC Davis	L 60–65	11–7 (4–3)	12 – Pickett	9 – Tattersall	3 – Pickett	SRC Arena (415); Riverside, CA
February 3, 2022; 8:00 p.m., ESPNU		Hawaiʻi	W 64–59	12–7 (5–3)	19 – Pullin	9 – Pullin	3 – McRae	SRC Arena (1,117); Riverside, CA
February 10, 2022; 7:00 p.m., ESPN+		at UC Irvine	L 56–66	12–8 (5–4)	14 – Pickett	8 – McRae	3 – Pickett	Bren Events Center (1,364); Irvine, CA
February 12, 2022*; 7:00 p.m., ESPN+		at UC San Diego	L 62–85	12–9	18 – Pickett	5 – Pickett	3 – Cameron	RIMAC Arena (724); La Jolla, CA
February 17, 2022; 7:00 p.m., ESPN+		Cal State Bakersfield	W 79–69	13–9 (6–4)	21 – Pickett	7 – McRae	7 – McRae	SRC Arena (635); Riverside, CA
February 19, 2022; 5:00 p.m., ESPN+		Cal Poly	W 78–58	14–9 (7–4)	19 – Pullin	10 – McRae	7 – McRae	SRC Arena (427); Riverside, CA
February 24, 2022; 7:00 p.m., ESPN+		CSUN	W 79–57	15–9 (8–4)	15 – Elkaz	13 – McRae	5 – Pullin	SRC Arena (576); Riverside, CA
February 26, 2022; 5:00 p.m., ESPN+		UC Santa Barbara	L 90–97 ^{2OT}	15–10 (8–5)	32 – McRae	11 – McRae	6 – Pullin	SRC Arena (1,004); Riverside, CA
March 3, 2022; 8:00 p.m., ESPNU		at Cal State Fullerton	W 75–72	16–10 (9–5)	15 – Pullin	6 – Pullin	8 – Pullin	Titan Gym (1,050); Fullerton, CA
March 5, 2022; 4:00 p.m., ESPN+		at Long Beach State	L 72–73 ^{OT}	16–11 (9–6)	24 – Pullin	10 – McRae	7 – Pullin	Walter Pyramid (1,824); Long Beach, CA
Big West tournament
March 10, 2022; 8:30 p.m., ESPN+	(6)	vs. (3) Hawaii; Quarterfinals	L 67–68	16–12	23 – Pullin	6 – tied	5 – Pullin	Dollar Loan Center; Henderson, NV
*Non-conference game. ^{#}Rankings from AP poll. (#) Tournament seedings in parentheses. All times are in Pacific.
