= 2021–22 Cal Poly Mustangs men's basketball team =

American college basketball season

2021–22 Cal Poly Mustangs men's basketball
- Conference: Big West Conference
- Record: 7–21 (2–12 Big West)
- Head coach: John Smith (3rd season)
- Assistant coaches: David Hanson; Justin Downer; Keith Berard
- Home arena: Mott Athletics Center (Capacity: 3,032)

2021–22 Big West men's basketball standings
	Conf.				Overall
Team	W		L	PCT	W		L	PCT
Long Beach State	12	–	3	.800	20	–	13	.606
Cal State Fullerton †	11	–	4	.733	21	–	11	.656
Hawai'i	10	–	5	.667	17	–	11	.607
UC Irvine	9	–	5	.643	15	–	10	.600
UC Santa Barbara	8	–	5	.615	17	–	11	.607
UC Riverside	9	–	6	.600	16	–	12	.571
UC Davis	5	–	6	.455	13	–	11	.542
UC San Diego*	7	–	11	.389	13	–	16	.448
Cal State Northridge	3	–	13	.188	7	–	23	.233
Cal State Bakersfield	2	–	12	.143	8	–	19	.296
Cal Poly	2	–	12	.143	7	–	21	.250
† 2022 Big West tournament winner * ineligible for the 2022 NCAA tournament and 2022 Big West tournament due to transition period; Big West games not counted in standings

The 2021–22 Cal Poly Mustangs men's basketball team represented California Polytechnic State University in the 2021–22 NCAA Division I men's basketball season. The Mustangs, led by third-year head coach John Smith, played their home games at the Robert A. Mott Athletics Center (Note: Formerly known as Mott Gym) in San Luis Obispo, California, and competed as members of the Big West Conference. They finished the season 7–21, 2–12 in Big West play, to finish 11th (and last) in their conference.

== Roster ==
2021–22 Cal Poly Mustangs men's basketball team
Players
Coaches

Pos.	#	Name	Height	Weight	Year	Previous school	Hometown
PG	0	Hayden Jory	5 ft 11 in (1.8 m)	170 lb (77 kg)	Fr	Cabrillo HS	Lompoc, CA
PG	1	Camren Pierce	5 ft 10 in (1.78 m)	175 lb (79 kg)	So	Etiwanda HS	Rancho Cucamonga, CA
G	2	Trevon Taylor	6 ft 6 in (1.98 m)	210 lb (95 kg)	Jr	James Madison	Chesapeake, VA
G	3	Kobe Sanders	6 ft 6 in (1.98 m)	175 lb (79 kg)	So	Christian HS	San Diego, CA
F	4	Brantly Stevenson	6 ft 4 in (1.93 m)	185 lb (84 kg)	So	Etiwanda HS	Rancho Cucamonga, CA
G	5	Julien Franklin	6 ft 7 in (2.01 m)	200 lb (91 kg)	RS Fr	Oregon State	Brea, CA
G	10	Jacob Davison	6 ft 4 in (1.93 m)	175 lb (79 kg)	GS	Eastern Washington	Long Beach, CA
SG	11	Aidan Prukop	6 ft 4 in (1.93 m)	180 lb (82 kg)	So	Mater Dei HS	Ladera Ranch, CA
F	12	Ajani Kennedy	6 ft 9 in (2.06 m)	225 lb (102 kg)	GS	UT Martin	Moreno Valley, CA
G	13	Nick Carlson	6 ft 0 in (1.83 m)	155 lb (70 kg)	So	Helix HS	La Mesa, CA
F	14	Tuukka Jaakkola	6 ft 10 in (2.08 m)	240 lb (109 kg)	Sr	Helsinki Basketball Academy	Helsinki, Finland
F/C	15	Alimamy Koroma	6 ft 8 in (2.03 m)	220 lb (100 kg)	Jr	Prolific Prep Academy	Freetown, Sierra Leone
F	22	Paxton Burzell	6 ft 8 in (2.03 m)	215 lb (98 kg)	Fr	JSerra Catholic HS	Laguna Beach, CA
G	24	Daniel Esparza	6 ft 2 in (1.88 m)	175 lb (79 kg)	Fr	Sonora HS	Whittier, CA
F	33	Kyle Colvin	6 ft 6 in (1.98 m)	200 lb (91 kg)	RS So	Mission Prep HS	San Luis Obispo, CA
C	35	Matur Dhal	6 ft 11 in (2.11 m)	195 lb (88 kg)	Fr	PHH Prep	Tempe, AZ

Head coach

- John Smith (Dominican (CA))

Assistant coach(es)

- David Hanson (Cal Poly)
- Justin Downer (Jessup)
- Keith Berard (Southern Utah)

Legend

- (C) Team captain
- (S) Suspended
- (I) Ineligible
- (W) Walk-on
- Injured
- Current redshirt

Roster
Last update: December 8, 2021

== Schedule and results ==
Date time, TV	Rank^{#}	Opponent^{#}	Result	Record	High points	High rebounds	High assists	Site (attendance) city, state
Exhibition
November 3, 2021*; 6:00 p.m.		Cal State Los Angeles	W 87–70	–	20 – Davison	6 – Taylor	7 – Davison	Mott Athletics Center; San Luis Obispo, CA
Non-conference regular season
November 9, 2021*; 7:00 p.m.		Westcliff	W 86–53	1–0	17 – Koroma	8 – Koroma	3 – Sanders	Mott Athletics Center (1,090); San Luis Obispo, CA
November 12, 2021*; 2:00 p.m., ESPN+		North Dakota State	L 57–60	1–1	19 – Davison	6 – Pierce	7 – Pierce	Mott Athletics Center (1,289); San Luis Obispo, CA
November 15, 2021*; 7:00 p.m., ESPN+		Sacramento State	L 57–58	1–2	19 – Koroma	10 – Taylor	4 – Pierce	Mott Athletics Center (1,214); San Luis Obispo, CA
November 19, 2021*; 6:00 p.m., WCC Network		at Santa Clara; SoCal Challenge campus game	L 57–87	1–3	18 – Colvin	9 – Franklin	4 – Pierce	Leavey Center (1,088); Santa Clara, CA
November 22, 2021*; 12:00 p.m., FloHoops		vs. Nicholls; SoCal Challenge Sand Division semifinals	L 72–75 ^{OT}	1–4	23 – Koroma	9 – Taylor	4 – Pierce	The Pavilion at JSerra (317); San Juan Capistrano, CA
November 24, 2021*; 12:00 p.m., FloHoops		vs. Idaho; SoCal Challenge Sand Division 3rd-place game	W 67–63	2–4	28 – Colvin	10 – Colvin	3 – Sanders	The Pavilion at JSerra (1,700); San Juan Capistrano, CA
December 2, 2021*; 7:00 p.m., ESPN+		at Cal Baptist	L 55–64	2–5	15 – Pierce	9 – Taylor	6 – Pierce	CBU Events Center (3,401); Riverside, CA
December 5, 2021*; 1:00 p.m., WCC Network		at San Diego	L 51–52	2–6	17 – Koroma	8 – Colvin	8 – Pierce	Jenny Craig Pavilion (385); San Diego, CA
December 11, 2021*; 7:00 p.m., ESPN+		at Portland State	W 61–58	3–6	16 – Davison	6 – tied	2 – tied	Viking Pavilion (812); Portland, OR
December 13, 2021*; 7:00 p.m., WCC Network		at Portland	L 77–78	3–7	27 – Taylor	8 – Taylor	3 – Davison	Chiles Center (889); Portland, OR
December 17, 2021*; 7:00 p.m., MW Network		at Fresno State	L 48–83	3–8	14 – Stevenson	7 – Sanders	2 – tied	Save Mart Center (4,461); Fresno, CA
December 22, 2021*; 7:00 p.m., P12N		at No. 5 UCLA	Canceled due to COVID-19 issues at UCLA					Pauley Pavilion; Los Angeles, CA
Big West regular season
December 30, 2021; 7:00 p.m., ESPN+		Long Beach State	Canceled due to COVID-19 protocols					Mott Athletics Center; San Luis Obispo, CA
January 1, 2022; 7:00 p.m., ESPN+		Cal State Fullerton	Canceled due to COVID-19 protocols					Mott Athletics Center; San Luis Obispo, CA
January 6, 2022; 7:00 p.m., ESPN+		at UC Santa Barbara; Rivalry	Canceled due to COVID-19 protocols					The Thunderdome; Santa Barbara, CA
January 8, 2022; 7:00 p.m., ESPN+		at CSUN	L 55–68	3–9 (0–1)	24 – Colvin	11 – Stevenson	3 – Pierce	Matadome (130); Northridge, CA
January 13, 2022; 7:00 p.m., ESPN+		UC Riverside	L 46–57	3–10 (0–2)	15 – Koroma	9 – Koroma	4 – Sanders	Mott Athletics Center (1,263); San Luis Obispo, CA
January 15, 2022; 7:00 p.m., ESPN+		UC Davis	W 82–74	4–10 (1–2)	21 – Koroma	7 – Koroma	8 – Pierce	Mott Athletics Center (1,862); San Luis Obispo, CA
January 18, 2022; 7:00 p.m., ESPN+		at Cal State Bakersfield	L 60–73	4–11 (1–3)	18 – Koroma	7 – Koroma	2 – tied	Icardo Center (490); Bakersfield, CA
January 22, 2022; 7:00 p.m., ESPN+		Hawaii	L 56–69	4–12 (1–4)	16 – Koroma	10 – Koroma	7 – Pierce	Mott Athletics Center (1,371); San Luis Obispo, CA
January 27, 2022*; 7:00 p.m., ESPN+		at UC San Diego	W 59–55	5–12	19 – Kuroma	8 – Taylor	3 – Pierce	RIMAC Arena (0); La Jolla, CA
January 29, 2022; 6:00 p.m., ESPN+		at UC Irvine	L 48–72	5–13 (1–5)	13 – Taylor	7 – Taylor	2 – Taylor	Bren Events Center (1,532); Irvine, CA
February 3, 2022; 7:00 p.m., ESPN+		at Cal State Fullerton	L 50–61	5–14 (1–6)	14 – Stevenson	8 – Taylor	4 – Taylor	Titan Gym (426); Fullerton, CA
February 5, 2022; 4:00 p.m., ESPN+		at Long Beach State	L 65–78	5–15 (1–7)	22 – Sanders	12 – Koroma	4 – Pierce	Walter Pyramid (1,062); Long Beach, CA
February 10, 2022; 7:00 p.m., ESPN+		CSUN	L 78–83 ^{2OT}	5–16 (1–8)	20 – Koroma	9 – Franklin	4 – Pierce	Mott Athletics Center (1,163); San Luis Obispo, CA
February 12, 2022; 7:00 p.m., ESPN+		UC Santa Barbara; Rivalry	L 64–69	5–17 (1–9)	15 – Taylor	9 – Taylor	5 – Pierce	Mott Athletics Center (2,117); San Luis Obispo, CA
February 17, 2022; 6:00 p.m., ESPN+		at UC Davis	Canceled due to COVID-19 protocols					University Credit Union Center; Davis, CA
February 19, 2022; 5:00 p.m., ESPN+		at UC Riverside	L 58–78	5–18 (1–10)	26 – Koroma	11 – Koroma	5 – Sanders	SRC Arena (427); Riverside, CA
February 22, 2022; 7:00 p.m., ESPN+		Cal State Bakersfield	L 60–61	5–19 (1–11)	14 – Taylor	8 – Stevenson	7 – Pierce	Mott Athletics Center (1,128); San Luis Obispo, CA
February 24, 2022; 9:00 p.m., ESPN+		at Hawaii	L 54–63	5–20 (1–12)	15 – Pierce	7 – Taylor	2 – Pierce	Stan Sheriff Center (3,699); Honolulu, HI
March 3, 2022; 7:00 p.m., ESPN+		UC Irvine	W 65–54	6–20 (2–12)	27 – Koroma	7 – Koroma	6 – Stevenson	Mott Athletics Center (1,868); San Luis Obispo, CA
March 5, 2022*; 7:00 p.m., ESPN+		UC San Diego	W 80–76	7–20	17 – Stevenson	7 – Stevenson	11 – Pierce	Mott Athletics Center (1,642); San Luis Obispo, CA
Big West tournament
March 8, 2022; 8:30 pm, ESPN+	(10)	vs. (7) UC Davis; First round	L 53–63	7–21	20 – Taylor	8 – Taylor	3 – Pierce	Dollar Loan Center; Henderson, NV
*Non-conference game. ^{#}Rankings from AP poll. (#) Tournament seedings in parentheses. All times are in Pacific.
