= 2021–22 Cal State Bakersfield Roadrunners men's basketball team =

American college basketball season

2021–22 Cal State Bakersfield Roadrunners men's basketball
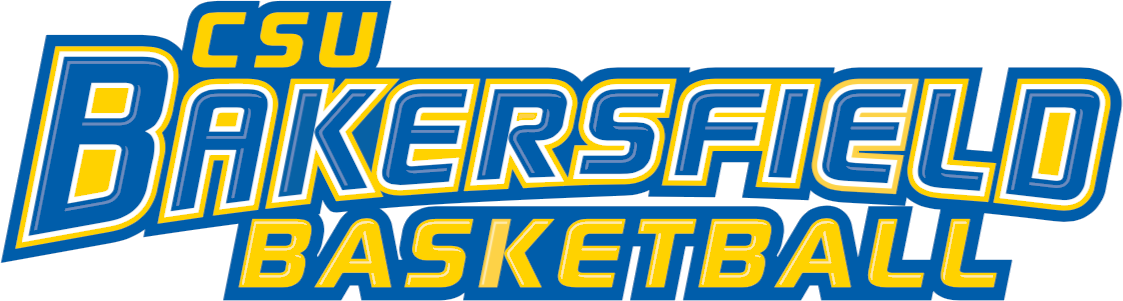
- Conference: Big West Conference
- Record: 8–19 (2–12 Big West)
- Head coach: Rod Barnes (11th season)
- Assistant coaches: Mike Scott (5th season); Brandon Barnes (3rd season); Chris Crevelone (2nd season)
- Home arena: Icardo Center

2021–22 Big West men's basketball standings
	Conf.				Overall
Team	W		L	PCT	W		L	PCT
Long Beach State	12	–	3	.800	20	–	13	.606
Cal State Fullerton †	11	–	4	.733	21	–	11	.656
Hawai'i	10	–	5	.667	17	–	11	.607
UC Irvine	9	–	5	.643	15	–	10	.600
UC Santa Barbara	8	–	5	.615	17	–	11	.607
UC Riverside	9	–	6	.600	16	–	12	.571
UC Davis	5	–	6	.455	13	–	11	.542
UC San Diego*	7	–	11	.389	13	–	16	.448
Cal State Northridge	3	–	13	.188	7	–	23	.233
Cal State Bakersfield	2	–	12	.143	8	–	19	.296
Cal Poly	2	–	12	.143	7	–	21	.250
† 2022 Big West tournament winner * ineligible for the 2022 NCAA tournament and 2022 Big West tournament due to transition period; Big West games not counted in standings

The 2021–22 Cal State Bakersfield Roadrunners men's basketball team represented California State University, Bakersfield in the 2021–22 NCAA Division I men's basketball season. The Roadrunners, led by 11th-year head coach Rod Barnes, played their home games at Icardo Center in Bakersfield, California as members of the Big West Conference.

== Previous season ==
The Roadrunners finished the 2020–21 season 15–11, 9–7 in Big West play, to finish in fifth place. As the #5 seed in the Big West tournament, they were defeated by #4 seed UC Davis in the quarterfinals.

== Roster ==
2021–22 Cal State Bakersfield Roadrunners men's basketball team
Players
Coaches

Pos.	#	Name	Height	Weight	Year	Hometown
G	1	Shaun Williams	6 ft 3 in (1.91 m)	185 lb (84 kg)	RS So	St. Louis, MO
F	2	Travis Henson	6 ft 6 in (1.98 m)	195 lb (88 kg)	Jr	Oxon Hill, MD
F	3	Cameron Smith	6 ft 7 in (2.01 m)	205 lb (93 kg)	Jr	Okolona, MS
G/F	4	Antavion Collum	6 ft 8 in (2.03 m)	240 lb (109 kg)	So	Memphis, TN
G	5	Grehlon Easter	6 ft 3 in (1.91 m)	180 lb (82 kg)	Jr	Little Rock, AR
G/F	10	Justin Edler-Davis	6 ft 4 in (1.93 m)	220 lb (100 kg)	RS Sr	San Diego, CA
F	11	Jack Schoemann	6 ft 7 in (2.01 m)	200 lb (91 kg)	Jr	Prairie Village, KS
G	12	David Walker	6 ft 4 in (1.93 m)	215 lb (98 kg)	So	Toronto, ON
G	13	Dalph Panopio	6 ft 1 in (1.85 m)	180 lb (82 kg)	Fr	Rome, Italy
G	14	Kaleb Higgins	5 ft 10 in (1.78 m)	155 lb (70 kg)	So	Pine Bluff, AR
F	15	Brian Washington	6 ft 6 in (1.98 m)	235 lb (107 kg)	So	Las Vegas, NV
G	21	Jahveon Medearis	6 ft 2 in (1.88 m)	160 lb (73 kg)	Fr	Downey, CA
G/F	22	Justin McCall	6 ft 6 in (1.98 m)	210 lb (95 kg)	Sr	Bakersfield, CA
G	23	Ivan Reynolds	6 ft 4 in (1.93 m)	200 lb (91 kg)	Fr	Pompano Beach, FL
C	24	Ray Somerville	6 ft 10 in (2.08 m)	230 lb (104 kg)	RS Fr	Media, PA
F	32	Shawn Stith	6 ft 8 in (2.03 m)	265 lb (120 kg)	Sr	East Oakland, CA

Head coach

- Rod Barnes (Mississippi)

Assistant coach(es)

- Mike Scott (Fairleigh Dickinson)
- Brandon Barnes (Cal State Bakersfield)
- Chris Crevelone (Adams State)

Legend

- (C) Team captain
- (S) Suspended
- (I) Ineligible
- (W) Walk-on
- Injured
- Current redshirt

Roster
Last update: December 20, 2021

== Schedule and results ==
Date time, TV	Rank^{#}	Opponent^{#}	Result	Record	Site (attendance) city, state
Exhibition
November 6, 2021*; 7:00 p.m., ESPN+		San Diego Christian	W 100–68	–	Icardo Center (802); Bakersfield, CA
Non-conference regular season
November 9, 2021*; 8:00 p.m., P12N		at No. 2 UCLA	L 58–95	0–1	Pauley Pavilion (5,618); Los Angeles, CA
November 13, 2021*; 8:00 p.m., ESPN+		Life Pacific	W 85–60	1–1	Icardo Center (834); Bakersfield, CA
November 18, 2021*; 5:00 p.m., ESPN+		at Northern Arizona	L 64–74	1–2	Rolle Activity Center (567); Flagstaff, AZ
November 22, 2021*; 7:00 p.m., ESPN+		Colorado College	W 99–54	2–2	Icardo Center (830); Bakersfield, CA
November 26, 2021*; 6:00 p.m.		at Boise State	W 46–39	3–2	ExtraMile Arena (7,429); Boise, ID
December 3, 2021*; 7:00 p.m., ESPN+		Benedictine Mesa; Exhibition	W 87–59	–	Icardo Center (702); Bakersfield, CA
December 11, 2021*; 7:00 p.m., ESPN+		Idaho	W 59–58	4–2	Icardo Center (899); Bakersfield, CA
December 15, 2021*; 5:30 p.m., ESPN+		at Abilene Christian	L 59–69	4–3	Teague Center (513); Abilene, TX
December 18, 2021*; 11:00 a.m., P12N		at Colorado	L 46–60	4–4	CU Events Center (5,888); Boulder, CO
December 21, 2021*; 2:00 p.m., ESPN+		Dartmouth	W 61–57	5–4	Icardo Center (840); Bakersfield, CA
Big West regular season
December 30, 2021; 7:00 p.m., ESPN+		Cal State Fullerton	L 67–73	5–5 (0–1)	Icardo Center (962); Bakersfield, CA
January 1, 2022; 1:00 p.m., Spectrum SportsNet		Long Beach State	Canceled due to COVID-19 issues		Icardo Center; Bakersfield, CA
January 6, 2022; 7:00 p.m., ESPN+		at Cal State Northridge	Canceled due to COVID-19 issues		Matadome; Northridge, CA
January 8, 2022; 7:00 p.m., ESPN+		at UC Santa Barbara	Canceled due to COVID-19 issues		The Thunderdome; Santa Barbara, CA
January 13, 2022; 7:00 p.m., ESPN+		UC Davis	Canceled due to COVID-19 issues		Icardo Center; Bakersfield, CA
January 15, 2022; 1:00 p.m., Spectrum SportsNet		UC Riverside	L 64–65	5–6 (0–2)	Icardo Center (486); Bakersfield, CA
January 18, 2022; 7:00 p.m., ESPN+		Cal Poly	W 73–60	6–6 (1–2)	Icardo Center (490); Bakersfield, CA
January 20, 2022; 7:00 p.m., ESPN+		Hawaii	L 59–63	6–7 (1–3)	Icardo Center (788); Bakersfield, CA
January 27, 2022; 7:00 p.m., ESPN+		at UC Irvine	L 52–57	6–8 (1–4)	Bren Events Center (790); Irvine, CA
January 29, 2022*; 7:00 p.m., ESPN+		at UC San Diego	L 75–83	6–9	RIMAC Arena (0); La Jolla, CA
February 3, 2022; 7:00 p.m., ESPN+		at Long Beach State	L 65–74	6–10 (1–5)	Walter Pyramid (925); Long Beach, CA
February 5, 2022; 7:00 p.m., ESPNU		at Cal State Fullerton	L 61–75	6–11 (1–6)	Titan Gym (723); Fullerton, CA
February 10, 2022; 7:00 p.m., ESPN+		UC Santa Barbara	L 62–74	6–12 (1–7)	Icardo Center (1,307); Bakersfield, CA
February 12, 2022; 7:00 p.m., ESPN+		Cal State Northridge	L 65–71	6–13 (1–8)	Icardo Center (960); Bakersfield, CA
February 17, 2022; 7:00 p.m., ESPN+		at UC Riverside	L 69–79	6–14 (1–9)	SRC Arena (635); Riverside, CA
February 19, 2022; 5:00 p.m., ESPN+		at UC Davis	L 79–81	6–15 (1–10)	University Credit Union Center (1,004); Davis, CA
February 22, 2022; 7:00 p.m., ESPN+		at Cal Poly	W 61–60	7–15 (2–10)	Mott Athletics Center (1,128); San Luis Obispo, CA
February 26, 2022; 9:00 p.m., ESPN+		at Hawaii	L 50–62	7–16 (2–11)	Stan Sheriff Center (4,660); Honolulu, HI
March 3, 2022*; 7:00 p.m., ESPN+		UC San Diego	L 70–72	7–17	Icardo Center (1,207); Bakersfield, CA
March 5, 2022; 1:00 p.m., ESPN+		UC Irvine	L 61–66	7–18 (2–12)	Icardo Center (1,323); Bakersfield, CA
Big West tournament
March 8, 2022; 6:00 p.m., ESPN+	(9)	vs. (8) Cal State Northridge; First round	W 58–45	8–18	Dollar Loan Center; Henderson, NV
March 9, 2022; 12:00 p.m., ESPN+	(9)	vs. (1) Long Beach State; Quarterfinals	L 61–72	8–19	Dollar Loan Center; Henderson, NV
*Non-conference game. ^{#}Rankings from AP poll. (#) Tournament seedings in parentheses. All times are in Pacific.
