= 2021–22 Cal State Fullerton Titans men's basketball team =

American college basketball team season

2021–22 Cal State Fullerton Titans men's basketball

Big West tournament champions

NCAA tournament, first round
- Conference: Big West Conference
- Record: 21–11 (11–4 Big West)
- Head coach: Dedrique Taylor (9th season)
- Assistant coaches: Chris Walker; Joey Brooks; Anthony Santos
- Home arena: Titan Gym (Capacity: 4,000)

2021–22 Big West men's basketball standings
	Conf.				Overall
Team	W		L	PCT	W		L	PCT
Long Beach State	12	–	3	.800	20	–	13	.606
Cal State Fullerton †	11	–	4	.733	21	–	11	.656
Hawai'i	10	–	5	.667	17	–	11	.607
UC Irvine	9	–	5	.643	15	–	10	.600
UC Santa Barbara	8	–	5	.615	17	–	11	.607
UC Riverside	9	–	6	.600	16	–	12	.571
UC Davis	5	–	6	.455	13	–	11	.542
UC San Diego*	7	–	11	.389	13	–	16	.448
Cal State Northridge	3	–	13	.188	7	–	23	.233
Cal State Bakersfield	2	–	12	.143	8	–	19	.296
Cal Poly	2	–	12	.143	7	–	21	.250
† 2022 Big West tournament winner * ineligible for the 2022 NCAA tournament and 2022 Big West tournament due to transition period; Big West games not counted in standings

The 2021–22 Cal State Fullerton Titans men's basketball team represented California State University, Fullerton in the 2021–22 NCAA Division I men's basketball season. The Titans, led by ninth-year head coach Dedrique Taylor, played their home games at Titan Gym in Fullerton, California as members of the Big West Conference. They finished the season 21–11, 11–4 in Big West play, to finish in second place. As the No. 2 seed, they defeated UC Davis, Hawaii and Long Beach State to be champions of the Big West tournament. They received the conference's automatic bid to the NCAA tournament as the No. 15 seed in the West Region, where they lost in the first round to Duke.

== Previous season ==
The Titans finished the 2020–21 season 5–6 overall, 4–6 in Big West play, to in seventh in the conference standings. The Big West Conference tournament was cancelled due to the COVID-19 pandemic, ending the Titans' season.

== Roster ==
2021–22 Cal State Fullerton Titans men's basketball team
Players
Coaches

Pos.	#	Name	Height	Weight	Year	Previous school	Hometown
G	0	Jalen Harris	6 ft 1 in (1.85 m)	180 lb (82 kg)	Sr	Casper College	Los Angeles, CA
F	1	Lado Laku	6 ft 10 in (2.08 m)	215 lb (98 kg)	So	Texas A&M–Corpus Christi	Dallas, TX
G	2	Tray Jr. Maddox	6 ft 6 in (1.98 m)	200 lb (91 kg)	Sr	Oakland	Novi, MI
G	3	Latrell Jr. Wrightsell	6 ft 3 in (1.91 m)	189 lb (86 kg)	So	Omaha Central HS	Omaha, NE
G/F	5	Landis Spivey	6 ft 5 in (1.96 m)	170 lb (77 kg)	Sr	Columbia College	Stockton, CA
G	11	Damari Milstead	6 ft 2 in (1.88 m)	195 lb (88 kg)	Sr	San Francisco	Oakland, CA
F	13	Vincent Lee	6 ft 8 in (2.03 m)	230 lb (104 kg)	Jr	Nevada	Midlothian, TX
F	14	Ibrahim Famouke Doumbia	6 ft 7 in (2.01 m)	205 lb (93 kg)	Sr	UCF	Bamako, Mali
G	21	Dante Jr. Maddox	6 ft 2 in (1.88 m)	195 lb (88 kg)	So	Bloom Township HS	Chicago Heights, IL
G	22	Grayson Carper	6 ft 6 in (1.98 m)	190 lb (86 kg)	Jr	Columbia College	Fresno, CA
G	23	Tory San Antonio	6 ft 3 in (1.91 m)	165 lb (75 kg)	Jr	Rancho Verde HS	Moreno Valley, CA
F	24	E.J. Anosike	6 ft 7 in (2.01 m)	236 lb (107 kg)	Sr	Tennessee	East Orange, NJ
G	35	Cameron Carter	6 ft 2 in (1.88 m)	180 lb (82 kg)	Jr	Damonte Ranch HS	Reno, NV

Head coach

- Dedrique Taylor (UC Davis)

Assistant coach(es)

- Chris Walker (Oklahoma)
- Anthony Santos (Cal State Fullerton)
- Joey Brooks (Notre Dame)

Legend

- (C) Team captain
- (S) Suspended
- (I) Ineligible
- (W) Walk-on
- Injured
- Current redshirt

Roster
Last update: July 7, 2025

== Schedule and results ==
Date time, TV	Rank^{#}	Opponent^{#}	Result	Record	Site (attendance) city, state
Exhibition
October 30, 2021*; 7:00 p.m.		Bethesda	W 105–46		Titan Gym; Fullerton, CA
Non-conference regular season
November 9, 2021; 6:00 p.m.		at Santa Clara	L 77–84	0–1	Leavey Center (1,031); Santa Clara, CA
November 11, 2021; 7:00 p.m.		at San Jose State	L 76–78	0–2	Provident Credit Union Event Center (1,521); San Jose, CA
November 16, 2021; 6:00 p.m., ESPN+		George Washington	W 74–59	1–2	Titan Gym (748); Fullerton, CA
November 19, 2021; 7:00 p.m.		at San Diego	W 57–55	2–2	Jenny Craig Pavilion (1,073); San Diego, CA
November 23, 2021; 5:00 p.m., ESPN+		vs. Texas–Rio Grande Valley; NAU Tournament	L 67–72	2–3	Rolle Activity Center (84); Flagstaff, AZ
November 24, 2021; 6:00 p.m., ESPN+		at Northern Arizona; NAU Tournament	W 73–56	3–3	Rolle Activity Center (278); Flagstaff, AZ
November 29, 2021; 7:00 p.m., ESPN+		Wyoming	L 66–79	3–4	Titan Gym (772); Fullerton, CA
December 4, 2021; 5:00 p.m., ESPN+		Pacific	W 66–57	4–4	Titan Gym (323); Fullerton, CA
December 8, 2021; 7:00 p.m.		at San Diego State	L 56–66	4–5	Viejas Arena (11,823); San Diego, CA
December 11, 2021*; 6:00 p.m., ESPN+		Life Pacific	W 87–59	5–5	Titan Gym (511); Fullerton, CA
December 17, 2021*; 7:00 p.m., ESPN+		Redlands	W 93–78	6–5	Titan Gym (509); Fullerton, CA
Big West regular season
December 30, 2021; 7:00 p.m., ESPN+		at Cal State Bakersfield	W 73–67	7–5 (1–0)	Icardo Center (962); Bakersfield, CA
January 1, 2022; 7:00 p.m.		at Cal Poly	Cancelled due to COVID health and safety protocols		Mott Athletics Center; San Luis Obispo, CA
January 4, 2022; 7:00 p.m.		Long Beach State	Cancelled due to COVID health and safety protocols		Titan Gym; Fullerton, CA
January 6, 2022; 7:00 p.m.		Hawaii	Cancelled due to COVID health and safety protocols		Titan Gym; Fullerton, CA
January 13, 2022; 7:00 p.m., ESPN+		CSUN	W 79–64	8–5 (2–0)	Titan Gym (288); Fullerton, CA
January 15, 2022; 6:00 p.m., ESPN+		UC Santa Barbara	W 79–73	9–5 (3–0)	Titan Gym (290); Fullerton, CA
January 20, 2022; 7:00 p.m., ESPN+		at UC Irvine	W 65–63	10–5 (4–0)	Bren Events Center (931); Irvine, CA
January 22, 2022*; 6:00 p.m., ESPN+		UC San Diego	W 83–80	11–5	Titan Gym (389); Fullerton, CA
January 27, 2022; 6:00 p.m., ESPN+		at UC Davis	W 74–58	12–5 (5–0)	University Credit Union Center (579); Davis, CA
January 29, 2022; 5:00 p.m., ESPN+		at UC Riverside	L 54–67	12–6 (5–1)	SRC Arena (0); Riverside, CA
February 3, 2022; 7:00 p.m., ESPN+		Cal Poly	W 61–50	13–6 (6–1)	Titan Gym (426); Fullerton, CA
February 5, 2022; 7:00 p.m., ESPNU		Cal State Bakersfield	W 75–61	14–6 (7–1)	Titan Gym (723); Fullerton, CA
February 8, 2022; 7:00 p.m., ESPN+		at Long Beach State	L 61–71	14–7 (7–2)	Walter Pyramid (2,025); Long Beach, CA
February 12, 2022; 9:00 p.m., ESPN2		at Hawaii	L 55–72	14–8 (7–3)	Stan Sheriff Center (4,619); Honolulu, HI
February 17, 2022; 7:00 p.m., ESPN+		at UC Santa Barbara	W 67–58	15–8 (8–3)	The Thunderdome (1,012); Santa Barbara, CA
February 19, 2022; 7:00 p.m., ESPN+		at CSUN	W 81–73	16–8 (9–3)	Matadome (405); Northridge, CA
February 24, 2022; 7:00 p.m., ESPN+		UC Irvine	W 66–64	17–8 (10–3)	Titan Gym (1,013); Fullerton, CA
February 26, 2022; 1:00 p.m., ESPN+		at UC San Diego	L 76–81	17–9	RIMAC Arena (808); La Jolla, CA
March 3, 2022; 8:00 p.m., ESPNU		UC Riverside	L 72–75	17–10 (10–4)	Titan Gym (1,050); Fullerton, CA
March 5, 2022; 6:00 p.m., ESPN+		UC Davis	W 62–59	18–10 (11–4)	Titan Gym (760); Fullerton, CA
Big West tournament
March 10, 2022; 6:00 p.m., ESPN+	(2)	vs. (7) UC Davis; Quarterfinals	W 73–55	19–10	Dollar Loan Center; Henderson, NV
March 11, 2022; 8:30 p.m., ESPNU	(2)	vs. (3) Hawaii; Semifinals	W 58–46	20–10	Dollar Loan Center; Henderson, NV
March 12, 2022; 8:30 p.m., ESPN2	(2)	vs. (1) Long Beach State; Championship	W 72–71	21–10	Dollar Loan Center; Henderson, NV
NCAA tournament
March 18, 2022; 4:10 p.m., CBS	(15 W)	vs. (2 W) No. 9 Duke; First round	L 61–78	21–11	Bon Secours Wellness Arena (14,295); Greenville, SC
*Non-conference game. ^{#}Rankings from AP poll. (#) Tournament seedings in parentheses. W=West. All times are in Pacific.
