= 2021–22 Cal State Northridge Matadors men's basketball team =

American college basketball season

2021–22 Cal State Northridge Matadors men's basketball
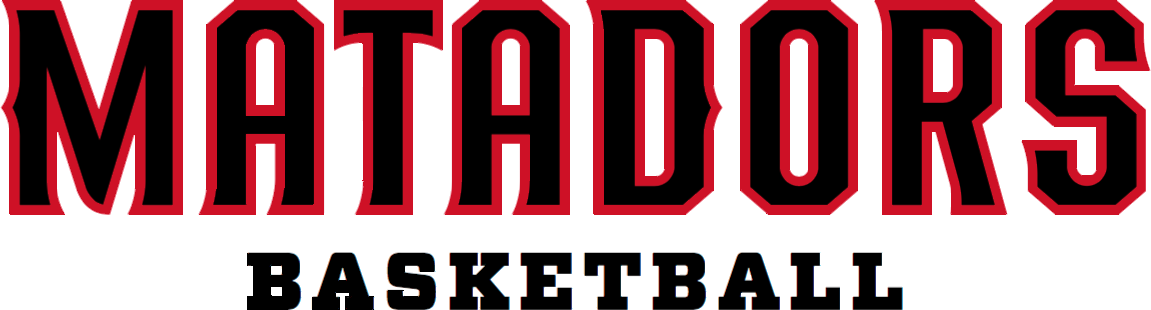
- Conference: Big West Conference
- Record: 7–23 (3–13 Big West)
- Head coach: Trent Johnson (Interim season)
- Assistant coaches: Terry Johnson; Chris Tifft; Brandon Billups
- Home arena: Matadome

2021–22 Big West men's basketball standings
	Conf.				Overall
Team	W		L	PCT	W		L	PCT
Long Beach State	12	–	3	.800	20	–	13	.606
Cal State Fullerton †	11	–	4	.733	21	–	11	.656
Hawai'i	10	–	5	.667	17	–	11	.607
UC Irvine	9	–	5	.643	15	–	10	.600
UC Santa Barbara	8	–	5	.615	17	–	11	.607
UC Riverside	9	–	6	.600	16	–	12	.571
UC Davis	5	–	6	.455	13	–	11	.542
UC San Diego*	7	–	11	.389	13	–	16	.448
Cal State Northridge	3	–	13	.188	7	–	23	.233
Cal State Bakersfield	2	–	12	.143	8	–	19	.296
Cal Poly	2	–	12	.143	7	–	21	.250
† 2022 Big West tournament winner * ineligible for the 2022 NCAA tournament and 2022 Big West tournament due to transition period; Big West games not counted in standings

The 2021–22 Cal State Northridge Matadors men's basketball team represented California State University, Northridge in the 2021–22 NCAA Division I men's basketball season. The Matadors, led by interim head coach Trent Johnson, played their home games at the Matadome in Northridge, California as members of the Big West Conference.

The Matadors finished the season 7–23, 3–13 in Big West play, to finish in eighth place. In the Big West tournament, they were defeated by Cal State Bakersfield in the first round.

== Previous season ==
In a season limited due to the ongoing COVID-19 pandemic, the Matadors finished the 2020–21 season 9–13, 5–9 in Big West play, to finish in eighth place. They lost to Long Beach State in the first round of the Big West tournament.

== Roster ==
2021–22 Cal State Northridge Matadors men's basketball team
Players
Coaches

Pos.	#	Name	Height	Weight	Year	Previous school	Hometown
G	0	Elijah Hardy	6 ft 2 in (1.88 m)	170 lb (77 kg)	Sr	Portland State	Oakland, CA
F	1	Lance Coleman II	6 ft 6 in (1.98 m)	205 lb (93 kg)	RS Sr	Fullerton College	Antioch, CA
G	2	Nick Herrmann	6 ft 2 in (1.88 m)	175 lb (79 kg)	Fr	Torrey Pines HS	San Diego, CA
G	3	Kailen Rains	6 ft 6 in (1.98 m)	195 lb (88 kg)	So	San Ysidro HS	San Diego, CA
G	4	Atin Wright	6 ft 1 in (1.85 m)	160 lb (73 kg)	So	Fairmont Prep	Lakewood, CA
F	5	Miles Brookins	6 ft 9 in (2.06 m)	220 lb (100 kg)	GS	La Salle	Cypress, CA
G	10	Darius Brown II	6 ft 2 in (1.88 m)	195 lb (88 kg)	Sr	Pasadena HS	Pasadena, CA
F	11	Christian Gray	6 ft 6 in (1.98 m)	250 lb (113 kg)	GS	Fresno State	Riverside, CA
G	12	Marcel Stevens	6 ft 2 in (1.88 m)	175 lb (79 kg)	So	Impact Academy	Beverly Hills, CA
F	13	Onyi Eyisi	6 ft 9 in (2.06 m)	225 lb (102 kg)	Sr	Fordham	Napa Valley, CA
G	22	Arman Pezeshkian	5 ft 10 in (1.78 m)	170 lb (77 kg)	RS So	Crescenta Valley HS	Glendale, CA
F	23	Elijah Uche	6 ft 7 in (2.01 m)	215 lb (98 kg)	RS Fr	Granada Hills Charter HS	Granada Hills, CA
F	24	Fidelis Okereke	6 ft 6 in (1.98 m)	240 lb (109 kg)	So	King/Drew HS	Carson, CA
G	25	Darius Beane	6 ft 3 in (1.91 m)	175 lb (79 kg)	Sr	Northern Illinois	Carbondale, IL
G/F	32	Brendan Harrick	6 ft 5 in (1.96 m)	190 lb (86 kg)	RS Jr	Esperanza HS	Anaheim, CA
F	33	Miles James	6 ft 6 in (1.98 m)	210 lb (95 kg)	Sr	East Carolina	Inglewood, CA

Head coach

- Trent Johnson (Boise State)

Assistant coach(es)

- Chris Tifft (Nevada)
- Terry Johnson (Stanislaus State)
- Brandon Billups (TCU)

Legend

- (C) Team captain
- (S) Suspended
- (I) Ineligible
- (W) Walk-on
- Injured
- Current redshirt

Roster
Last update: January 20, 2022

== Schedule and results ==
Date time, TV	Rank^{#}	Opponent^{#}	Result	Record	Site (attendance) city, state
Non-conference regular season
November 9, 2021*; 6:00 p.m., P12N		at USC	L 49–89	0–1	Galen Center (3,321); Los Angeles, CA
November 13, 2021*; 9:00 a.m., ACCNX/ESPN+		at Notre Dame	L 52–68	0–2	Edmund P. Joyce Center (5,062); South Bend, IN
November 19, 2021*; 2:00 p.m., ESPN+		Eastern Washington; Good Sam Empire Classic	L 64–67 ^{OT}	0–3	Matadome (483); Northridge, CA
November 20, 2021*; 12:00 p.m., ESPN+		Dixie State; Good Sam Empire Classic	W 79–73	1–3	Matadome (193); Northridge, CA
November 24, 2021*; 2:00 p.m., ESPN+		Saint Katherine; Good Sam Empire Classic	W 71–62	2–3	Matadome (233); Northridge, CA
November 28, 2021*; 3:00 p.m.		at San Diego	W 56–52	3–3	Jenny Craig Pavilion (889); San Diego, CA
December 4, 2021*; 4:00 p.m.		at Fresno State	L 43–61	3–4	Save Mart Center (3,762); Fresno, CA
December 7, 2021*; 7:00 p.m., ESPN+		Boise State	L 48–74	3–5	Matadome (442); Northridge, CA
December 10, 2021*; 5:00 p.m., ESPN+		at North Dakota State	L 54–68	3–6	Scheels Center (1,403); Fargo, ND
December 18, 2021*; 7:00 p.m., ESPN+		Portland State	W 69–66	4–6	Matadome (400); Northridge, CA
December 22, 2021*; 2:00 p.m., ESPN+		Bethesda	L 80–82	4–7	Matadome (193); Northridge, CA
Big West regular season
December 30, 2021; 7:00 p.m.		at UC Irvine	Canceled due to COVID-19 protocols		Bren Events Center; Irvine, CA
January 1, 2022; 7:00 p.m., ESPN+		at UC San Diego	L 64–72	4–8	RIMAC Arena (0); La Jolla, CA
January 6, 2022; 7:00 p.m., ESPN+		Cal State Bakersfield	Canceled due to COVID-19 protocols		Matadome; Northridge, CA
January 8, 2022; 1:00 p.m., ESPN+		Cal Poly	W 68–55	5–8 (1–0)	Matadome (130); Northridge, CA
January 13, 2022; 7:00 p.m., ESPN+		at Cal State Fullerton	L 64–79	5–9 (1–1)	Titan Gym (288); Fullerton, CA
January 15, 2022; 4:00 p.m., ESPN+		at Long Beach State	L 55–71	5–10 (1–2)	Walter Pyramid (1,017); Long Beach, CA
January 20, 2022; 7:00 p.m., ESPN+		UC Davis	L 47–64	5–11 (1–3)	Matadome (104); Northridge, CA
January 22, 2022; 7:00 p.m., ESPN+		UC Riverside	L 67–77	5–12 (1–4)	Matadome (0); Northridge, CA
January 25, 2022; 7:00 p.m., ESPN+		UC Santa Barbara	L 45–72	5–13 (1–5)	Matadome (103); Northridge, CA
January 27, 2022; 9:00 p.m., ESPN+		at Hawaii	L 65–72	5–14 (1–6)	Stan Sheriff Center (3,419); Honolulu, HI
February 3, 2022; 7:00 p.m., ESPN+		UC San Diego	L 77–83	5–15	Matadome (240); Northridge, CA
February 5, 2022; 7:00 p.m., ESPN+		UC Irvine	L 70–75	5–16 (1–7)	Matadome (300); Northridge, CA
February 10, 2022; 7:00 p.m., ESPN+		at Cal Poly	W 83–78 ^{OT}	6–16 (2–7)	Mott Athletics Center (1,163); San Luis Obispo, CA
February 12, 2022; 7:00 p.m., ESPN+		at Cal State Bakersfield	W 71–65	7–16 (3–7)	Icardo Center (960); Bakersfield, CA
February 17, 2022; 7:00 p.m., ESPN+		Long Beach State	L 59–72	7–17 (3–8)	Matadome (515); Northridge, CA
February 19, 2022; 7:00 p.m., ESPN+		Cal State Fullerton	L 73–81	7–18 (3–9)	Matadome (405); Northridge, CA
February 24, 2022; 7:00 p.m., ESPN+		at UC Riverside	L 57–79	7–19 (3–10)	SRC Arena (576); Riverside, CA
February 26, 2022; 5:00 p.m., ESPN+		at UC Davis	L 49–68	7–20 (3–11)	University Credit Union Center (1,549); Davis, CA
March 1, 2022; 7:00 p.m., ESPN+		at UC Santa Barbara	L 61–70	7–21 (3–12)	The Thunderdome (2,300); Santa Barbara, CA
March 5, 2022; 7:00 p.m., ESPN+		Hawaii	L 62–84	7–22 (3–13)	Matadome (615); Northridge, CA
Big West tournament
March 8, 2022; 6:00 p.m., ESPN+	(8)	vs. (9) Cal State Bakersfield; First round	L 45–58	7–23	Dollar Loan Center; Henderson, NV
*Non-conference game. ^{#}Rankings from AP poll. (#) Tournament seedings in parentheses. All times are in Pacific.
