= 2022 Big West Conference men's basketball tournament =

- Classification: Division I
- Season: 2021–22
- Teams: 10
- Site: Dollar Loan Center; Henderson, Nevada
- Champions: Cal State Fullerton (4th title)
- Winning coach: Dedrique Taylor
- Television: ESPN+ ESPNU; ESPN2

2021–22 Big West men's basketball standings
	Conf.				Overall
Team	W		L	PCT	W		L	PCT
Long Beach State	12	–	3	.800	20	–	13	.606
Cal State Fullerton †	11	–	4	.733	21	–	11	.656
Hawai'i	10	–	5	.667	17	–	11	.607
UC Irvine	9	–	5	.643	15	–	10	.600
UC Santa Barbara	8	–	5	.615	17	–	11	.607
UC Riverside	9	–	6	.600	16	–	12	.571
UC Davis	5	–	6	.455	13	–	11	.542
UC San Diego*	7	–	11	.389	13	–	16	.448
Cal State Northridge	3	–	13	.188	7	–	23	.233
Cal State Bakersfield	2	–	12	.143	8	–	19	.296
Cal Poly	2	–	12	.143	7	–	21	.250
† 2022 Big West tournament winner * ineligible for the 2022 NCAA tournament and 2022 Big West tournament due to transition period; Big West games not counted in standings

The 2022 Big West Conference men's basketball tournament was the postseason men's basketball tournament for the Big West Conference of the 2021–22 NCAA Division I men's basketball season. It was held March 8–12, 2022, at the Dollar Loan Center in Henderson, Nevada. The winner, the Cal State Fullerton Titans, received the conference's automatic bid to the 2022 NCAA tournament.

== Seeds ==
Of the 11 conference teams, 10 were eligible for the tournament. UC San Diego was ineligible for the tournament, as it was in the second year of the four-year transition required for teams transferring to Division I from Division II. Teams were seeded by record within the conference, with a tiebreaker system to seed teams with identical conference records. Unlike previous years, reseeding teams after the quarterfinals did not take place for the 2022 tournament.

Seed	School	Record	Tiebreaker
1	Long Beach State	12–3	
2	Cal State Fullerton	11–4	
3	Hawai'i	10–5	
4	UC Irvine	9–5	
5	UC Santa Barbara	8–5	
6	UC Riverside	9–6	
7	UC Davis	5–6	
8	Cal State Northridge	3–13	
9	Cal State Bakersfield	2–12	2–0 vs Cal Poly
10	Cal Poly	2–12	0–2 vs Cal State Bakersfield

== Schedule and results ==
Game	Time	Matchup	Score	Television
First round – Tuesday, March 8
1	6:00 pm	No. 8 CSUN vs. No. 9 CSU Bakersfield	58–45	ESPN+
2	8:30 pm	No. 7 UC Davis vs. No. 10 Cal Poly	63–53	ESPN+
Quarterfinals – Thursday, March 10
3	12:00 pm	No. 1 Long Beach State vs. No. 9 CSU Bakersfield	72–61	ESPN+
4	2:30 pm	No. 4 UC Irvine vs. No. 5 UC Santa Barbara	69–78	ESPN+
5	6:00 pm	No. 2 CSU Fullerton vs. No. 7 UC Davis	73–55	ESPN+
6	8:30 pm	No. 3 Hawaii vs. No. 6 UC Riverside	68–67	ESPN+
Semifinals – Friday, March 11
7	6:00 pm	No. 1 Long Beach State vs. No. 5 UC Santa Barbara	67–64	ESPN+
8	8:30 pm	No. 2 CSU Fullerton vs. No. 3 Hawaii	58–46	ESPNU
Final – Saturday, March 12
9	8:30 pm	No. 1 Long Beach State vs. No. 2 CSU Fullerton	71-72	ESPN2
*Game times in PST. Rankings denote tournament seed

== Bracket ==
First round March 8 ESPN+
8	Cal State Northridge	45
9	Cal State Bakersfield	58
7	UC Davis	63
10	Cal Poly	53

Quarterfinals; March 10; ESPN+
1	Long Beach State	72
9	Cal State Bakersfield	61
4	UC Irvine	69
5	UC Santa Barbara	78
2	Cal State Fullerton	73
7	UC Davis	55
3	Hawaii	68
6	UC Riverside	67

Semifinals; March 11; ESPN+/ESPNU
1	Long Beach State	67
5	UC Santa Barbara	64
2	Cal State Fullerton	58
3	Hawaii	46

Championship; March 12; ESPN2
1	Long Beach State	71
2	Cal State Fullerton	72
