= UC Riverside Student Recreation Center =

American college recreation center and arena

Student Recreation Center
- SRC
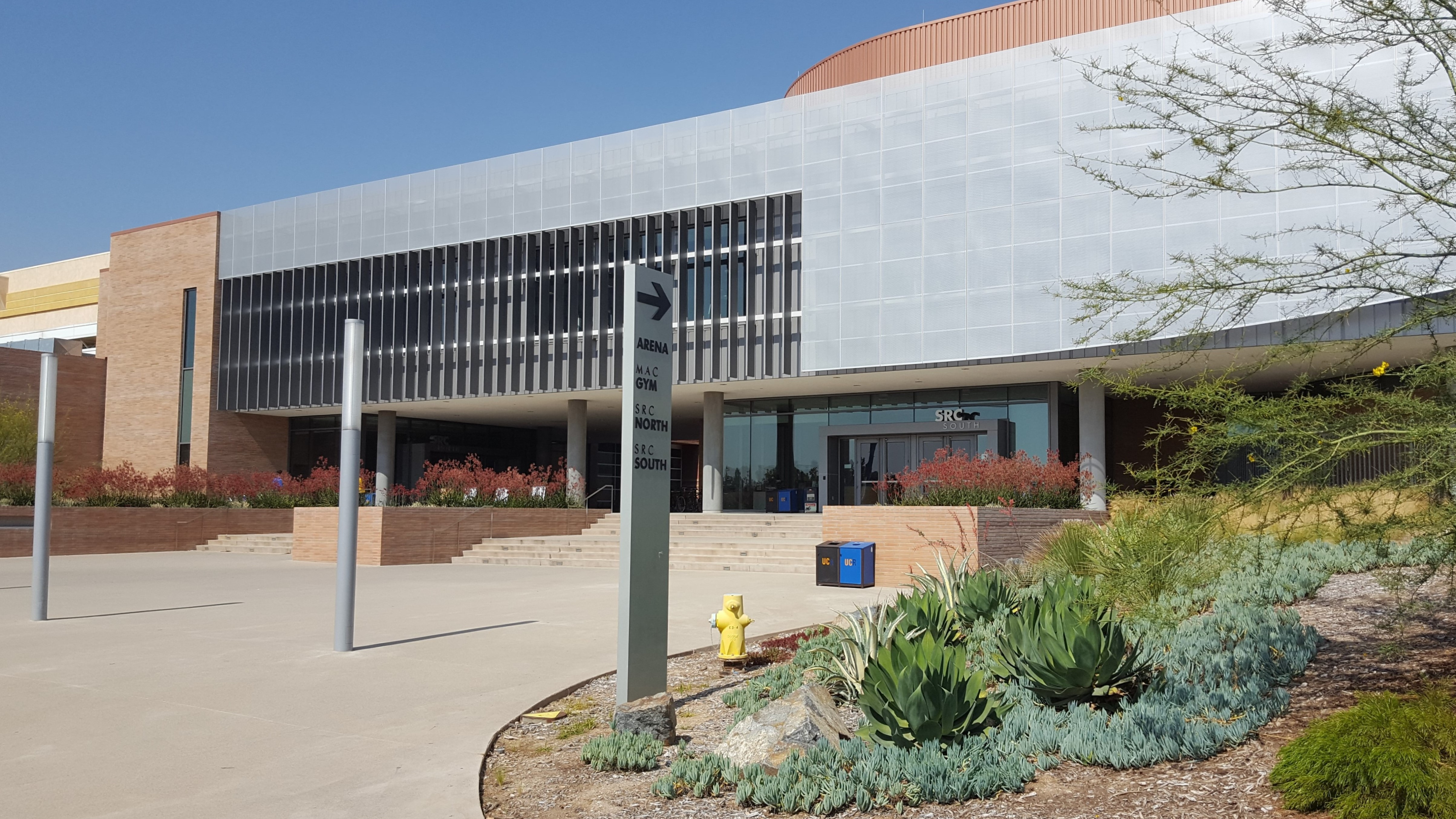
- Interactive map of Student Recreation Center
- Location: Riverside, CA
- Coordinates: 33.97890°N 117.32813°W
- Owner: University of California, Riverside
- Operator: University of California, Riverside Athletics Department
- Capacity: 3,168
- Surface: Multi-surface

Construction
- Opened: 1994

Tenants
- UC Riverside Highlanders men's basketball (NCAA) (1994–present); UC Riverside Highlanders women's basketball (NCAA) (1994–present); UC Riverside Highlanders women's volleyball (NCAA) (1994–present)

Website
- UC Riverside Highlanders Athletics

The UC Riverside Student Recreation Center is available to UCR students for physical fitness, sport activities and general recreational use. The Student Recreation Center Arena (SRC Arena) is located in the building. It is home to the UC Riverside Highlanders men's basketball, women's basketball and women's volleyball teams.

== History ==
The 80,000 square feet (7,400 m^{2}) UC Riverside Student Recreation Center (SRC) opened on January 11, 1994. In 2010, students voted to expand the SRC with funding from their student services' fees. Planning and construction took place over the course of the next four years (2010-2014) with the renovated facility opening on October 3, 2014. The renovations "nearly doubled the size of the current SRC (increasing from 80,000 square feet (7,400 m^{2}) to 155,000 square feet (14,400 m^{2})), adding an indoor climbing wall, an indoor track, a pool, a multi-activity court and newly renovated weight rooms."

== Student Recreation Center Arena ==
The Student Recreation Center Arena (SRC Arena) is located in the building. It seats up to 3,168 people and is home to the UC Riverside Highlanders men's basketball, UC Riverside Highlanders women's basketball and UC Riverside Highlanders women's volleyball teams. The arena offers full locker rooms for the teams.

== Tenants ==
=== UC Riverside Highlanders ===
The athletics department for UC Riverside is located in the building along with the home venue for its basketball and volleyball teams.

== Amenities ==
The Student Recreation Center offers locker rooms, 6,000 square feet (560 m^{2}) weight training facility and 3,000 square feet (280 m^{2}) area dedicated to cardio-fitness machines. The facility also includes a large swimming pool and spa, tennis courts, an indoor running track, an auxiliary gym with multiple courts, four racquetball/wallyball courts, one squash court, a classroom kitchen, an indoor climbing wall and boulder. It also has three multipurpose rooms.

== Uses ==
The Student Recreation Center's main function is for the well-being of the UC Riverside student population through physical fitness and intramural sports. It has also hosted events including student commencement ceremonies, conferences, musical bands and acts.

== Gallery ==
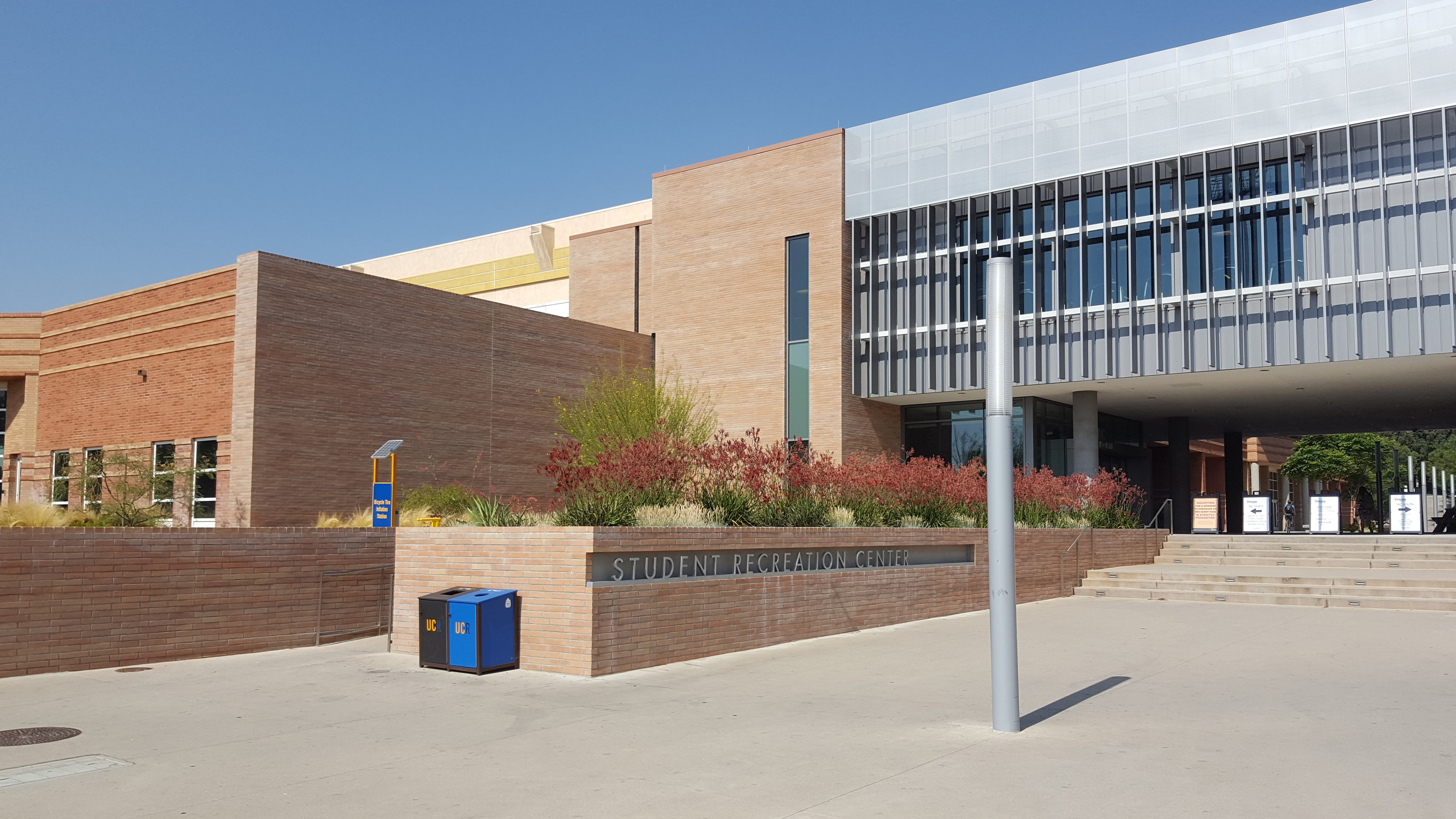
Student Recreation Center

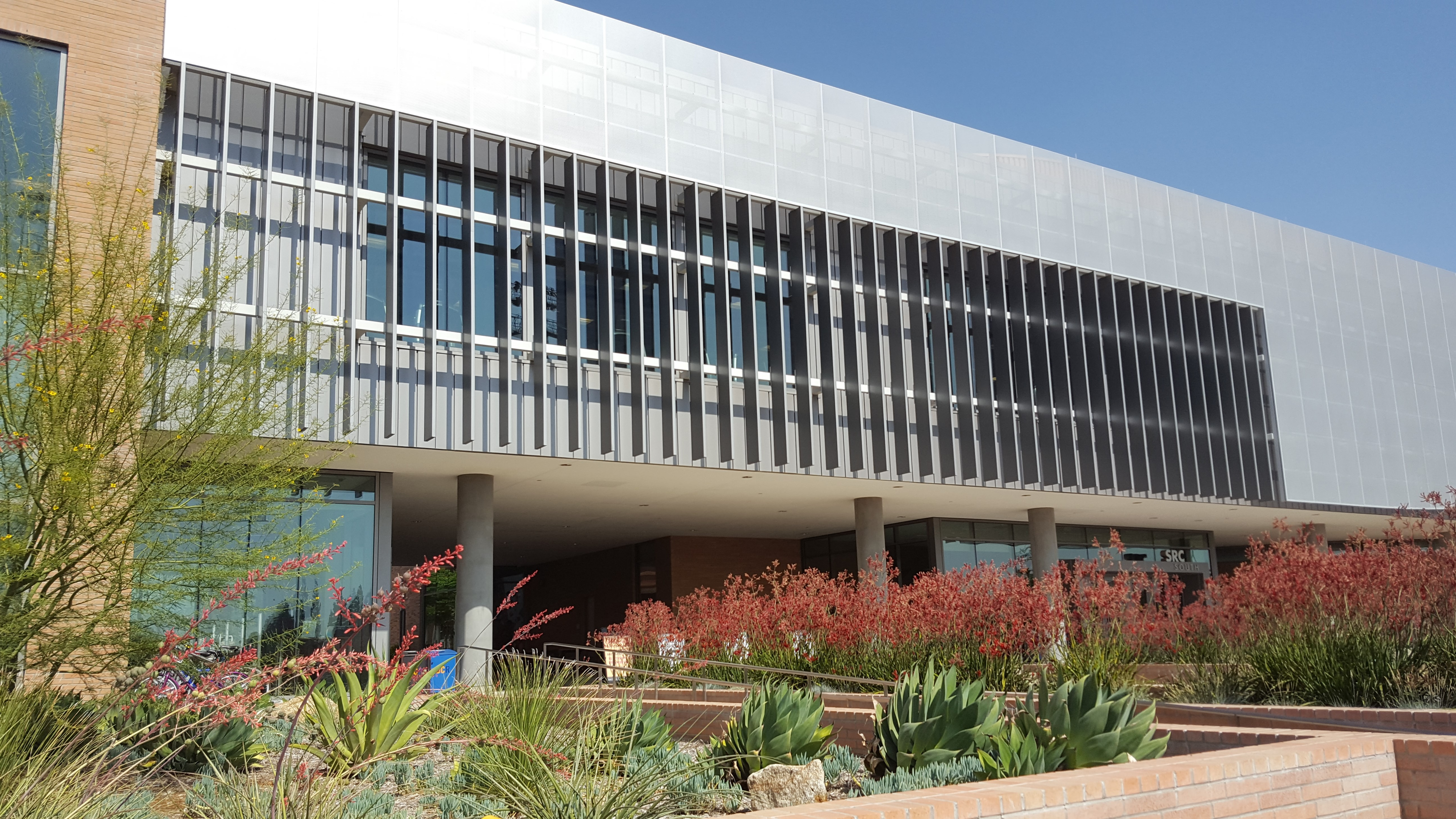
Student Recreation Center-Main Entrance

== See also ==
- UC Riverside Highlanders
- List of NCAA Division I basketball arenas
