= 2022–23 BYU Cougars men's basketball team =

2022–23 BYU Cougars men's basketball
- Conference: West Coast Conference
- Record: 19–15 (7–9 WCC)
- Head coach: Mark Pope (4th season)
- Assistant coaches: Nick Robinson (4th season); Cody Fueger (4th season); Kahil Fennell (1st season)
- Home arena: Marriott Center (Capacity: 17,978 – ↓ 1,009 from 2021–22)

2022–23 West Coast Conference men's basketball standings
	Conf.				Overall
Team	W		L	PCT	W		L	PCT
No. 19 Saint Mary's	14	–	2	.875	27	–	8	.771
No. 9 Gonzaga†	14	–	2	.875	31	–	6	.838
Santa Clara	11	–	5	.688	23	–	10	.697
Loyola Marymount	9	–	7	.563	19	–	12	.613
San Francisco	7	–	9	.438	20	–	14	.588
BYU	7	–	9	.438	19	–	15	.559
Pacific	7	–	9	.438	15	–	18	.455
Portland	5	–	11	.313	14	–	19	.424
San Diego	4	–	12	.250	11	–	20	.355
Pepperdine	2	–	14	.125	9	–	22	.290
† 2023 WCC tournament winner Rankings from AP poll

The 2022–23 BYU Cougars men's basketball team represented Brigham Young University during the 2022–23 NCAA Division I men's basketball season. In head coach Mark Pope's fourth season as BYU's head coach and the Cougars 12th and final season as members of the West Coast Conference (WCC) as they will begin as members of the Big 12 Conference in the 2023–24 season. The Cougars played their home games at the Marriott Center in Provo, Utah.

== Previous season ==
The Cougars finished the 2021–22 season 24–11, 9–6 in WCC play to finish in fifth place. In the WCC tournament, they defeated Loyola Marymount in the second round before losing to San Francisco in the quarterfinals. BYU received an at-large bid to the National Invitation Tournament as a No. 2 seed. They defeated Long Beach State and Northern Iowa before losing in the quarterfinals to Washington State.

== Offseason ==
=== Coaching changes ===
On April 13, it was reported that then BYU assistant coach Chris Burgess had accepted a position as assistant coach at the University of Utah. Some possible expected candidates to replace Burgess included Mark Madsen (Utah Valley head coach), Kahil Fennell (former Louisville assistant), Dave Rice (former UNLV head coach), and Paul Peterson (Wasatch Academy head coach). On May 11, it was reported that Kahil Fennell was expected to fill the position. Two weeks later on May 26, Mark Pope announced that Kahil Fennell had been hired as the new assistant coach.

=== Departures ===
Four scholarship players from the 2021–22 season graduated at the end of the year. Graduates Alex Barcello and Te'Jon Lucas completed their college eligibility, while Gavin Baxter and Richard Harward have one additional year of eligibility remaining. While Richard Harward is expected to end his athletic career, Gavin Baxter entered the transfer portal on April 19. Jeremy DowDell, Nate Hansen, Hunter Erickson, Seneca Knight, and Caleb Lohner also entered the transfer portal during March and April. Additionally, Gideon George entered the transfer portal after declaring for the NBA draft. However, he later withdrew his name from the transfer portal stating, "Finishing what we started."

Name	Number	Position	Height	Weight	Year	Hometown	Reason for Departure
Hunter Erickson	0	G	6'3"	191	Sophomore	Provo, Utah	Entered transfer portal on April 5. Committed to Salt Lake Community College on July 5.
Jeremy DowDell	2	G	6'2"	174	Freshman	Salt Lake City, Utah	Entered transfer portal on March 31 Committed to Westminster College.
Te'Jon Lucas	3	G	6'1"	187	Senior	Milwaukee, Wisconsin	Graduated
Nate Hansen	10	G	6'3"	178	Freshman	Provo, Utah	Entered transfer portal on April 2
Alex Barcello	13	G	6'2"	192	Senior	Chandler, Arizona	Graduated
Seneca Knight	24	F	6'6"	224	Senior	New Orleans, Louisiana	Entered transfer portal on April 30. Committed to Illinois State on May 11.
Caleb Lohner	33	F	6"8"	235	Sophomore	Dallas, Texas	Entered transfer portal on April 19. Committed to Baylor on April 22.
Gavin Baxter	42	F	6'9"	228	Senior	Provo, Utah	Graduated and entered transfer portal on April 19. Committed to Utah as a walk-on on April 29.
Richard Harward	51	C	6'11"	256	Senior	Orem, Utah	Graduated

=== Incoming transfers ===
On May 7, 2022 Rudi Williams committed to BYU with one year of eligibility remaining as a graduate transfer. Williams narrowed his choices to 8 schools which included San Diego State, UConn, Cal, Butler, Xavier, Wichita State and Mason before selecting BYU. Jaxson Robinson announced on Twitter on June 16 that he had committed to BYU. Since Robinson entered the transfer portal after May 1, he required—and received—a waiver to play during the 2022–23 season. After previously committing to St Bonaventure in early June, Noah Waterman announced he would be transferring to BYU on June 27. Waterman previously played basketball at Detroit Mercy and Niagara. On June 30, it was reported that Tredyn Christensen had committed to play for BYU as a preferred walk-on. He previously played two years at Snow College and most recently at Division II Chaminade University of Honolulu. On July 6, the head coach at Umpqua Community College, Daniel Leeworthy, announced that one of his players, Nathan Webb, had committed to play at BYU. Webb will have 3 years of eligibility remaining.

Name	Number	Position	Height	Weight	Year	Hometown	Previous school	Years remaining	Walk-on/ Scholarship	Rivals	247Sports	ESPN	ESPN Grade	Commit date
Noah Waterman	0	G/F	6'11"	210	Junior	Savannah, New York	Finger Lakes Christian School, Detroit Mercy, Niagara	2	Scholarship	N/A	N/A	N/A	N/A	June 27, 2022
Jaxson "Jax" Robinson	2	G	6'6"	185	Junior	Ada, Oklahoma	Texas A&M, Arkansas	3	Scholarship	4-star	4-star	4-star	80	June 16, 2022
Rueadale "Rudi" Williams	3	G	6'2"	190	Senior	Hamilton, Ontario	NE Oklahoma A&M, Kansas State, Coastal Carolina	1	Scholarship	N/A	3-star (JUCO)	N/A	N/A	May 7, 2022
Tredyn Christensen	10	G	6'6"	225	Junior	Eagle Mountain, Utah	Snow College, Chaminade	2	Walk-on	N/A	N/A	N/A	N/A	June 30, 2022
Nathan Webb	33	F	6'7"	205	Junior	Rexburg, Idaho	Umpqua Community College	3	Walk-on	N/A	N/A	N/A	N/A	July 6, 2022

=== Returned missionaries ===
Four returned missionaries were added to the roster for the 2022–23 season. Dallin Hall, Richie Saunders, and Tanner Toolson each hold scholarship positions while Tanner Hayhurst will join as a preferred walk-on. All four players have four years of eligibility remaining.

Name	Number	Position	Height	Weight	Missionary service years	Mission location	Hometown	Previous school	Years remaining	Recruiting class	Rivals	247Sports	ESPN	ESPN Grade
Tanner Toolson	13	G	6'5"	185	2020–21 & 2021–22	Florida	Vancouver, Washington	Union High School	4	2020	N/A	N/A	N/A	N/A
Richie Saunders	15	G	6'5"	180	2020–21 & 2021–22	Washington & Madagascar	Mount Pleasant, Utah	Wasatch Academy	4	2020	3-star	3-star	N/A	N/A
Tanner Hayhurst	24	G	6'6"	175	2020–21 & 2021–22	Louisiana	Eagle, Idaho	Eagle High School	4	2020	N/A	N/A	N/A	N/A
Dallin Hall	30	G	6'3"	180	2020–21 & 2021–22	California & Philippines	Ogden, Utah	Fremont High School	4	2020	3-star	3-star	N/A	N/A

=== Currently serving missionaries ===
Five players are completing missionary service during the 2022–23 academic year. Townsend Tripple delayed his missionary assignment to Argentina and was part of the roster during the 2020–21 season. Jake Wahlin was part of the 2021 recruiting class and plans to join the team for the 2023–24 season after missionary service in Lithuania. Paora Winitana was also part of the 2021 recruiting class and will start missionary service after one year on the team. Collin Chandler and Adam Stewart were part of the 2022 recruiting class.

Name	Number	Position	Height	Weight	Missionary service years	Mission location	Hometown	Previous school	Years remaining	Recruiting class	Rivals	247Sports	ESPN	ESPN Grade
Townsend Tripple	24	F	6'8"	200	2021–22 & 2022–23	Argentina	Meridian, Idaho	Rocky Mountain High School	4	2020	N/A	N/A	N/A	N/A
Paora Winitana	40	G	6'5"	242	2022–23 & 2023–24	California	Hawkes Bay, New Zealand	American Heritage	4	2021	N/A	N/A	N/A	N/A
Jake Wahlin	–	F	6'8"	195	2021–22 & 2022–23	Lithuania	Provo, Utah	Timpview High School	4	2021	3-star	3-star	3-star	75
Collin Chandler	–	G	6'4"	175	2022–23 & 2023–24	Sierra Leone	Farmington, Utah	Farmington High School	4	2022	4-star	4-star	4-star	89
Adam Stewart	–	C	6'10"	210	2022–23 & 2023–24	France	Houston, Texas	Real Salt Lake Adademy	4	2022	N/A	N/A	3-star	78

=== 2022 recruiting class ===
Collin Chandler committed and signed with BYU on November 10, 2021. Chandler was recruited by Utah, Arizona, Stanford, and Utah State. He will go on a mission and enroll at BYU in 2024. He is the highest ranked BYU recruit since Eric Mika in 2013. Adam Stewart committed to BYU after being recruited since 7th grade. He will be a walk-on starting with the 2024–25 season after completing a mission to Paris, France. Braeden Moore committed to BYU after he had originally committed in 2021 to play at Rutgers. He was recruited by Kansas, Wisconsin, Nebraska, Arizona State, Houston, San Diego State, and Auburn. On July 29, 2022, Hao Dong committed to BYU as a walk-on and will join the team for the 2022–23 season.

College recruiting
Name	Hometown	School	Height	Weight	Commit date
Collin Chandler; Guard	Farmington, Utah	Farmington High School	6 ft 4 in (1.93 m)	175 lb (79 kg)	Nov 10, 2021
Collin Chandler; Guard	Recruit ratings: Rivals: 247Sports: ESPN: (89)				
Adam Stewart; Center	Houston, Texas	Real Salt Lake Academy	6 ft 10 in (2.08 m)	210 lb (95 kg)	Apr 16, 2022
Adam Stewart; Center	Recruit ratings: Scout: Rivals: 247Sports: ESPN: (78)				
Braeden Moore; Forward	Nashville, Tennessee	Donda Academy	6 ft 8 in (2.03 m)	210 lb (95 kg)	May 13, 2022
Braeden Moore; Forward	Recruit ratings: Rivals: 247Sports: ESPN: (80)				
Hao Dong; Forward	Beijing, China	Real Salt Lake Academy	6 ft 6 in (1.98 m)	200 lb (91 kg)	Jul 29, 2022
Hao Dong; Forward	Recruit ratings: Rivals: 247Sports: ESPN: (N/A)				
Overall recruit ranking: Scout: nr Rivals: nr 247Sports: nr
Note: In many cases, Scout, Rivals, 247Sports, On3, and ESPN may conflict in their listings of height and weight.; In these cases, the average was taken. ESPN grades are on a 100-point scale.; Sources: "BYU 2022 Basketball Commitments". Rivals.; "ESPN". ESPN.; "2022 Team Ranking". Rivals.com.; "2022 BYU Basketball Commits". 247Sports.

== Roster ==
2022–23 BYU Cougars men's basketball team
Players
Coaches

Pos.	#	Name	Height	Weight	Year	Previous school	Hometown
F	0	Noah Waterman	6 ft 11 in (2.11 m)	215 lb (98 kg)	So	Finger Lakes Christian School; Detroit Mercy; Niagara	Savannah, New York
G	1	Trey Stewart	6 ft 2 in (1.88 m)	189 lb (86 kg)	So	American Fork High School	American Fork, Utah
G	2	Jaxson Robinson	6 ft 7 in (2.01 m)	200 lb (91 kg)	So	Ada High School; Texas A&M; Arkansas	Ada, Oklahoma
G	3	Rudi Williams	6 ft 2 in (1.88 m)	195 lb (88 kg)	Sr	NE Oklahoma A&M; Kansas State; Coastal Carolina	Hamilton, Ontario
F	4	Atiki Ally Atiki	6 ft 9 in (2.06 m)	213 lb (97 kg)	So	London Basketball Academy (Ontario, Canada)	Mwanza, Tanzania
F	5	Gideon George	6 ft 6 in (1.98 m)	210 lb (95 kg)	Sr	New Mexico JC	Minna, Nigeria
F	10	Tredyn Christensen (W)	6 ft 6 in (1.98 m)	235 lb (107 kg)	Jr	Westlake High School; Snow College; Chaminade	Eagle Mountain, Utah
F	12	Braeden Moore	6 ft 9 in (2.06 m)	215 lb (98 kg)	Fr	Donda Academy	Nashville, Tennessee
G	13	Tanner Toolson	6 ft 5 in (1.96 m)	190 lb (86 kg)	Fr	Union High School	Vancouver, Washington
G	15	Richie Saunders	6 ft 5 in (1.96 m)	200 lb (91 kg)	Fr	Wasatch Academy	Riverton, Utah
G	20	Spencer Johnson	6 ft 5 in (1.96 m)	185 lb (84 kg)	RS Jr	American Fork; Weber State; Utah Valley; Salt Lake CC	American Fork, Utah
G	21	Trevin Knell (injured)	6 ft 5 in (1.96 m)	197 lb (89 kg)	Jr	Woods Cross	Woods Cross, Utah
G	24	Tanner Hayhurst (W)	6 ft 6 in (1.98 m)	210 lb (95 kg)	Fr	Eagle High School	Eagle, Idaho
G	30	Dallin Hall	6 ft 3 in (1.91 m)	180 lb (82 kg)	Fr	Fremont High School	Plain City, Utah
F	33	Nate Webb (W)	6 ft 6 in (1.98 m)	210 lb (95 kg)	So	Madison High School; Umpqua Community College	Rexburg, Idaho
F	45	Fousseyni Traore	6 ft 6 in (1.98 m)	254 lb (115 kg)	So	Wasatch Academy	Bamako, Mali
G	51	Jared McGregor (W)	6 ft 2 in (1.88 m)	185 lb (84 kg)	Fr	Westlake High School	Saratoga Springs, Utah
F	55	Hao Dong (W)	6 ft 5 in (1.96 m)	210 lb (95 kg)	Fr	Real Salt Lake Academy	Beijing, China

Head coach

- Mark Pope (Kentucky)

Assistant coach(es)

- Cody Fueger (Utah)
- Nick Robinson (Stanford)
- Kahil Fennell (Redlands)

Legend

- (C) Team captain
- (S) Suspended
- (I) Ineligible
- (W) Walk-on
- Injured
- Current redshirt

Roster

== Media coverage ==
=== Radio ===
Greg Wrubell and Mark Durrant return to call men's basketball for the 2022–23 season. Jason Shepherd will act as the host for most games, though Ben Bagley will fill-in for Shepherd when he has women's soccer, baseball, or college basketball duties.

Affiliates:

- BYU Radio- Flagship Station Nationwide (Dish Network 980, Sirius XM 143, KBYU 89.1 FM HD 2, TuneIn radio, and byuradio.org)
- KSL 102.7 FM and 1160 AM- (Salt Lake City / Provo, Utah and ksl.com)
- KSNA 100.7 FM - Blackfoot / Idaho Falls / Pocatello / Rexburg, Idaho (games)
- KSPZ 105.1 FM and 980 AM- Blackfoot / Idaho Falls / Pocatello / Rexburg, Idaho (coaches' shows)
- KMXD 100.5 FM- Monroe / Manti, Utah
- KSVC 980 AM- Richfield / Manti, Utah
- KDXU 94.9 FM and 890 AM- St. George, Utah

=== Television ===
In September 2019, the West Coast Conference (WCC) agreed to a multi-year deal through the 2026–27 season with ESPN and the CBS Sports Network to broadcast numerous basketball games each year. Previously, the WCC had an agreement with ESPN, but the new agreement adds additional television coverage of basketball games through the CBS Sports Network. Games broadcast on the CBS Sports Network are carried on channel 158 on the Dish Network, channel 221 on DirecTV and channel 269 on Xfinity. Under the terms of the deal, ESPN will broadcast 17 games during the regular season and the CBS Sports Network will broadcast a minimum of 9 games. ESPN will continue to broadcast the quarterfinals, semifinals and the championship game of the WCC tournament. BYU maintains the rights to broadcast home games on BYUtv (11.1 in Salt Lake City, Utah, channel 374 on the Dish Network, and channel 4369/9403 on DirecTV). Meanwhile, Stadium broadcasts will be simulcast on KJZZ or KMYU. The broadcasts became even more important after Sinclair sold KSTU, causing Stadium to leave the Digital 3 station.

== Schedule ==
Date time, TV	Rank^{#}	Opponent^{#}	Result	Record	Site (attendance) city, state
Scrimmage
October 26, 2022*; 7:00pm, BYUtv App		Blue and White Game	W 78–65	–	Marriott Center; Provo, UT
Exhibition
November 2, 2022*; 7:00pm, BYUtv		Ottawa (Arizona)	W 109–69	–	Marriott Center (7,315); Provo, UT
Non-conference regular season
November 7, 2022*; 7:00pm, BYUtv		Idaho State	W 60–56	1–0	Marriott Center (13,972); Provo, UT
November 11, 2022*; 8:30pm, MW Network		at No. 19 San Diego State; Rivalry	L 75–82	1–1	Viejas Arena (12,414); San Diego, CA
November 16, 2022*; 7:00pm, BYUtv		Missouri State	W 66–64	2–1	Marriott Center (12,587); Provo, UT
November 19, 2022*; 7:00pm, BYUtv		Nicholls State	W 87–73	3–1	Marriott Center (13,745); Provo, UT
November 23, 2022*; 3:00pm, ESPN2		vs. USC; Battle 4 Atlantis quarterfinals	L 76–82	3–2	Imperial Arena (465); Paradise Island, The Bahamas
November 24, 2022*; 3:30pm, ESPN3		vs. Butler; Battle 4 Atlantis consolation 2nd round	L 70–75	3–3	Imperial Arena (821); Paradise Island, The Bahamas
November 25, 2022*; 1:30 p.m., ESPNU		vs. Dayton; Battle 4 Atlantis 7th place game	W 79–75 ^{OT}	4–3	Imperial Arena (715); Paradise Island, The Bahamas
November 29, 2022*; 7:00pm, BYUtv		vs. Westminster	W 100–70	5–3	Vivint Arena; Salt Lake City, UT
December 3, 2022*; 1:30pm, BYUtv		vs. South Dakota	L 68–69	5–4	Vivint Arena (11,578); Salt Lake City, UT
December 7, 2022*; 7:00pm, BYUtv		Utah Valley; UCCU Crosstown Clash	L 60–75	5–5	Marriott Center (13,925); Provo, UT
December 10, 2022*; 8:00pm, FS1		vs. No. 21 Creighton; Jack Jones Hoopfest	W 83–80	6–5	Michelob Ultra Arena; Las Vegas, NV
December 15, 2022*; 7:00pm, BYUtv		Western Oregon	W 97–64	7–5	Marriott Center (11,720); Provo, UT
December 17, 2022*; 4:00pm, CBSSN		Utah; Deseret First Duel	W 75–66	8–5	Marriott Center (14,355); Provo, UT
December 20, 2022*; 7:00pm, BYUtv		Lindenwood	W 90–61	9–5	Marriott Center (12,180); Provo, UT
December 22, 2022*; 7:00pm, BYUtv		Weber State	W 63–57	10–5	Marriott Center (13,229); Provo, UT
WCC Regular Season
December 29, 2022; 7:00pm, WCC Network		at Pacific	W 69–49	11–5 (1–0)	Alex G. Spanos Center (2,840); Stockton, CA
December 31, 2022; 7:00pm, BYUtv		Portland	W 71–58	12–5 (2–0)	Marriott Center (13,793); Provo, UT
January 5, 2023; 9:00pm, ESPNU		at Loyola Marymount	L 59–64	12–6 (2–1)	Gersten Pavilion (1,147); Los Angeles, CA
January 7, 2023; 8:00pm		at San Diego	W 68–48	13–6 (3–1)	Jenny Craig Pavilion (2,157); San Diego, CA
January 12, 2023; 7:30pm, ESPN		No. 8 Gonzaga; Rivalry	L 74–75	13–7 (3–2)	Marriott Center (18,987); Provo, UT
January 14, 2023; 7:00pm, BYUtv		Pepperdine	W 91–81	14–7 (4–2)	Marriott Center (14,434); Provo, UT
January 19, 2023; 9:00pm, CBSSN		at Santa Clara	L 76–83	14–8 (4–3)	Leavey Center (2,455); Santa Clara, CA
January 21, 2023; 6:00pm, CBSSN		at San Francisco	L 74–82	14–9 (4–4)	War Memorial Gymnasium; San Francisco, CA
January 28, 2023; 9:00pm, ESPN2		No. 22 Saint Mary's	L 56–57	14–10 (4–5)	Marriott Center (15,843); Provo, UT
February 2, 2023; 7:00pm, CBSSN		Loyola Marymount	W 89–61	15–10 (5–5)	Marriott Center (13,363); Provo, UT
February 4, 2023; 7:00pm, BYUtv		Pacific	W 81–66	16–10 (6–5)	Marriott Center (14,431); Provo, UT
February 9, 2023; 9:00pm, CBSSN		at Pepperdine	L 80–92	16–11 (6–6)	Firestone Fieldhouse (1,059); Malibu, CA
February 11, 2023; 8:00pm, ESPN2		at No. 16 Gonzaga; Rivalry	L 81–88	16–12 (6–7)	McCarthey Athletic Center (6,000); Spokane, WA
February 16, 2023; 7:00pm, CBSSN		Santa Clara	L 74–81	16–13 (6–8)	Marriott Center (13,321); Provo, UT
February 18, 2023; 8:00pm, ESPN2		at No. 17 Saint Mary's	L 65–71	16–14 (6–9)	University Credit Union Pavilion (3,500); Moraga, CA
February 25, 2023; 8:00pm, ESPNU		San Francisco	W 87–61	17–14 (7–9)	Marriott Center (15,990); Provo, UT
WCC tournament
March 3, 2023; 7:00pm, WCC Network	(5)	vs. (8) Portland; Second Round	W 82–71	18–14	Orleans Arena; Paradise, NV
March 4, 2023; 8:00pm, ESPN2	(5)	vs. (4) Loyola Marymount; Quarterfinals	W 73–63	19–14	Orleans Arena; Paradise, NV
March 6, 2023; 6:00pm, ESPN	(5)	vs. (1) No. 16 Saint Mary's; Semifinals	L 69–76	19–15	Orleans Arena; Paradise, NV
*Non-conference game. ^{#}Rankings from AP Poll. (#) Tournament seedings in parentheses. All times are in Mountain Time.

== Future opponents ==
The upcoming 2023–24 season is the first season BYU will play in the Big 12. Their Big 12 conference schedule is expected to be 18 games, or two more compared to the 16 games that the WCC has scheduled for the most recent five years. For the 2023–24 season, the schedule is also expected to include the following non-conference opponents:.

- San Diego State (home)
- Utah (away)
- Big East opponent (Big East–Big 12 Battle)
- Three game MTE (multi-team event)
