= 2021–22 BYU Cougars men's basketball team =

2021–22 BYU Cougars men's basketball

NIT, Quarterfinals
- Conference: West Coast Conference
- Record: 24–11 (9–6 WCC)
- Head coach: Mark Pope (3rd season)
- Assistant coaches: Chris Burgess (3rd season); Cody Fueger (3rd season); Nick Robinson (3rd season)
- Home arena: Marriott Center (Capacity: 18,987)

2021–22 West Coast Conference men's basketball standings
	Conf.				Overall
Team	W		L	PCT	W		L	PCT
No. 1 Gonzaga †	13	–	1	.929	28	–	4	.875
No. 18 Saint Mary's	12	–	3	.800	26	–	8	.765
Santa Clara	10	–	5	.667	21	–	12	.636
San Francisco	10	–	6	.625	24	–	10	.706
BYU	9	–	6	.600	24	–	11	.686
Portland	7	–	7	.500	19	–	15	.559
San Diego	7	–	9	.438	15	–	16	.484
Pacific	3	–	11	.214	8	–	22	.267
Loyola Marymount	3	–	12	.200	11	–	18	.379
Pepperdine	1	–	15	.063	7	–	25	.219
† 2022 WCC tournament winner Rankings from AP poll

The 2021–22 BYU Cougars men's basketball team represented Brigham Young University in the 2021–22 NCAA Division I men's basketball season. It was head coach Mark Pope's third season as BYU's head coach and the Cougars eleventh season as members of the West Coast Conference (WCC). The Cougars played their home games at the Marriott Center in Provo, Utah. They finished the season 24–11, 9–6 in WCC Play to finish in 5th place. They defeated Loyola Marymount in the Second Round of the WCC tournament before losing in the Third Round to San Francisco. They received an at-large bid to the National Invitation Tournament where they defeated Long Beach State and Northern Iowa to advance to the quarterfinals where they lost to Washington State.

== Previous season ==
The Cougars finished the 2020–21 season 20–7, 10–3 in West Coast Conference play to finish in second place. As the Number 2 seed in the WCC Tournament, they lost to Gonzaga in the finals. BYU received an at-large bid to the NCAA tournament as a Number 6 seed. UCLA defeated BYU in the first round of the tournament 73–62.

== Offseason ==
=== Departures ===
Matt Haarms and Brandon Averette waived their additional season of eligibility due to coronavirus and joined professional teams in Europe. Wyatt Lowell, Kolby Lee and Connor Harding all transferred to other Utah colleges and universities. Due to injuries, Jesse Wade graduated early and decided to forgo additional years of college eligibility and end his college basketball career. In mid-July, media reports indicated that Brandon Warr had decided to leave the team to focus on school and that Cameron Pearson had decided to transfer from BYU.

Name	Number	Position	Height	Weight	Year	Hometown	Reason for Departure
Wyatt Lowell	1	F	6'10"	205	Junior	Gilbert, Arizona	Transferred to Snow College
Brandon Warr	2	F	6'5"	210	Senior	Salt Lake City, Utah	Left team to focus on school
Matt Haarms	3	C	7'3"	250	Senior	Amsterdam, Netherlands	Joined professional club in Germany Skyliners Frankfurt
Brandon Averette	4	G	5'11"	185	Senior	Richardson, Texas	Joined professional club in Cyprus AEL Limassol B.C.
Jesse Wade	10	G	6'1"	175	Sophomore	Kaysville, Utah	Graduated early
Cameron Pearson	15	G	6'0"	175	Redshirt Sophomore	Lakewood, Colorado	Graduated
Kolby Lee	40	F	6'9"	260	Junior	Meridian, Idaho	Transferred to Dixie State and then retired in August
Connor Harding	44	G	6"6"	185	Junior	Pocatello, Idaho	Transferred to Utah Valley

=== Incoming transfers ===
Two players joined the roster after entering the transfer portal during the offseason. Te'Jon Lucas was recruited by Utah, Nevada, DePaul and New Mexico State but committed to BYU on May 19. He is a redshirt senior and has one year of eligibility due to COVID-19 eligibility extension. On July 19, Seneca Knight announced he had committed to BYU after two full seasons at San Jose State and transferring to LSU mid-season. He is a junior and was also considering transferring to Georgia Southern and Idaho. On September 24, Knight received a waiver from the NCAA is will be eligible to play for the 2021–22 season.

Name	Number	Position	Height	Weight	Year	Hometown	Previous school	Years remaining	Date eligible	Walk-on/ Scholarship	Rivals	247Sports	ESPN	ESPN Grade
Te'Jon Lucas	3	G	6'2"	180	Redshirt Senior	Milwaukee, Wisconsin	Wisconsin, Milwaukee & Illinois	1	October 1, 2021	Scholarship	3-star	3-star	3-star	79
Seneca Knight	24	G	6'7"	215	Junior	Lafayette, Louisiana	LSU & San Jose State	2	October 1, 2021	Scholarship	N/A	N/A	N/A	N/A

=== Returned missionaries ===
Four returned missionaries were added to the roster for the 2021–22 season. Nate Hansen and Trey Stewart will hold scholarship positions while Casey Brown and Jeremy DowDell will join as preferred walk-ons. Each of the four players have four years of eligibility remaining.

Name	Number	Position	Height	Weight	Missionary service years	Mission location	Hometown	Previous school	Years remaining	Recruiting class	Rivals	247Sports	ESPN	ESPN Grade
Trey Stewart	1	G	6'3"	195	2019–20 & 2020–21	England & Washington	American Fork, UT	American Fork	4	2019	N/A	N/A	4-star	80
Jeremy DowDell	2	G	6'3"	180	2019–20 & 2020–21	Argentina & Houston	Salt Lake City, UT	Olympus	4	2019	N/A	N/A	N/A	N/A
Nate Hansen	10	G	6'3"	165	2019–20 & 2020–21	Arkansas	Provo, UT	Timpview	4	2019	3-star	3-star	N/A	N/A
Casey Brown	55	G	6'3"	175	2019–20 & 2020–21	Argentina & San Jose	Pleasant Grove, UT	Pleasant Grove	4	2019	N/A	N/A	N/A	N/A

=== Currently serving missionaries ===
Six players committed to BYU are completing missionary service during the 2021–22 season. Four of these players - Dallin Hall, Tanner Hayhurst, Richie Saunders and Tanner Toolson will complete their service during the season and will join the roster for the 2022–23 season. Townsend Tripple delayed his missionary assignment to Argentina and was part of the roster during the 2020–21 season. Jake Wahlin was part of the 2021 recruiting class and plans to complete a mission trip and join the team for the 2023–24 season.

Name	Number	Position	Height	Weight	Missionary service years	Mission location	Hometown	Previous school	Years remaining	Recruiting class	Rivals	247Sports	ESPN	ESPN Grade
Dallin Hall	–	G	6'3"	180	2020–21 & 2021–22	Philippines	Ogden, Utah	Fremont High School	4	2020	3-star	3-star	N/A	N/A
Tanner Hayhurst	–	G	6'6"	175	2020–21 & 2021–22	Louisiana	Eagle, Idaho	Eagle High School	4	2020	N/A	N/A	N/A	N/A
Richie Saunders	–	G	6'5"	180	2020–21 & 2021–22	Washington & Madagascar	Mount Pleasant, Utah	Wasatch Academy	4	2020	3-star	3-star	N/A	N/A
Tanner Toolson	–	G	6'5"	185	2020–21 & 2021–22	Florida	Vancouver, Washington	Union High School	4	2020	N/A	N/A	N/A	N/A
Townsend Tripple	24	F	6'8"	200	2021–22 & 2022–23	Argentina	Meridian, Idaho	Rocky Mountain High School	4	2020	N/A	N/A	N/A	N/A
Jake Wahlin	–	F	6'8"	195	2021–22 & 2022–23	Lithuania	Provo, Utah	Timpview High School	4	2021	3-star	3-star	3-star	75

=== 2021 Recruiting class ===
Jake Wahlin committed to BYU in early September and officially signed on November 11, 2020. Wahlin was recruited by Arizona State, San Diego State and New Mexico as well as other schools. He plans to complete a mission trip and join the team for the 2023–24 season. In addition, forward Fousseyni Traore from Wasatch Academy signed with the Cougars on November 19, over schools such as Seton Hall and Utah State. He will join the program for the 2021–22 season. Atiki Ally Atiki, from the London Basketball Academy in Ontario, Canada, verbally committed to BYU on February 15, 2021, and will also join the program for the 2021–22 season. On August 8, 2021, Paora Winitana, from American Heritage School in Utah, committed to BYU as a walk-on. He plans to complete a mission after one year on the team.

College recruiting
Name	Hometown	School	Height	Weight	Commit date
Jake Wahlin; Forward	Provo, Utah	Timpview High School	6 ft 8 in (2.03 m)	195 lb (88 kg)	Sep 16, 2020
Jake Wahlin; Forward	Recruit ratings: Rivals: 247Sports: ESPN: (75)				
Fousseyni Traore; Forward	Bamako, Mali	Wasatch Academy	6 ft 7 in (2.01 m)	235 lb (107 kg)	Nov 19, 2020
Fousseyni Traore; Forward	Recruit ratings: No ratings found				
Atiki Ally Atiki; Center	Mwanza, Tanzania	London Basketball Academy (Ontario, Canada)	6 ft 11 in (2.11 m)	235 lb (107 kg)	Feb 15, 2021
Atiki Ally Atiki; Center	Recruit ratings: Rivals:				
Paora Winitana; Guard	American Fork, Utah	American Heritage School	6 ft 6 in (1.98 m)	245 lb (111 kg)	Aug 8, 2021
Paora Winitana; Guard	Recruit ratings: No ratings found				
Overall recruit ranking: Scout: nr Rivals: nr 247Sports: nr
Note: In many cases, Scout, Rivals, 247Sports, On3, and ESPN may conflict in their listings of height and weight.; In these cases, the average was taken. ESPN grades are on a 100-point scale.; Sources: "BYU 2021 Basketball Commitments". Rivals.; "ESPN". ESPN.; "2021 Team Ranking". Rivals.com.; "2021 BYU Basketball Commits". 247Sports.

=== 2022 Recruiting class ===
Collin Chandler committed and signed with BYU on November 10, 2021. Chandler was recruited by Utah, Arizona, Stanford, and Utah State. He will go on a mission and enroll at BYU in 2024. He is the highest ranked BYU recruit since Eric Mika in 2013. Adam Stewart committed to BYU after being recruited since 7th grade. He will be a walk-on starting with the 2024–25 season after completing a mission to Paris, France. Braeden Moore committed to BYU after he had originally committed in 2021 to play at Rutgers. He was recruited by Kansas, Wisconsin, Nebraska, Arizona State, Houston, San Diego State, and Auburn.

College recruiting
Name	Hometown	School	Height	Weight	Commit date
Collin Chandler; Guard	Farmington, Utah	Farmington High School	6 ft 4 in (1.93 m)	175 lb (79 kg)	Nov 10, 2021
Collin Chandler; Guard	Recruit ratings: Rivals: 247Sports: ESPN: (89)				
Adam Stewart; Center	Houston, Texas	Real Salt Lake Academy	6 ft 10 in (2.08 m)	210 lb (95 kg)	Apr 16, 2022
Adam Stewart; Center	Recruit ratings: Scout: Rivals: 247Sports: ESPN: (78)				
Braeden Moore; Forward	Nashville, Tennessee	Donda Academy	6 ft 8 in (2.03 m)	210 lb (95 kg)	May 13, 2022
Braeden Moore; Forward	Recruit ratings: Rivals: 247Sports: ESPN: (80)				
Overall recruit ranking: Scout: nr Rivals: nr 247Sports: nr
Note: In many cases, Scout, Rivals, 247Sports, On3, and ESPN may conflict in their listings of height and weight.; In these cases, the average was taken. ESPN grades are on a 100-point scale.; Sources: "BYU 2022 Basketball Commitments". Rivals.; "ESPN". ESPN.; "2022 Team Ranking". Rivals.com.; "2022 BYU Basketball Commits". 247Sports.

== Roster ==
2021–22 BYU Cougars men's basketball team
Players
Coaches

Pos.	#	Name	Height	Weight	Year	Previous school	Hometown
G	0	Hunter Erickson	6 ft 3 in (1.91 m)	191 lb (87 kg)	So	Timpview	Provo, UT
G	1	Trey Stewart	6 ft 2 in (1.88 m)	189 lb (86 kg)	Fr	American Fork	American Fork, UT
G	2	Jeremy DowDell (W)	6 ft 2 in (1.88 m)	174 lb (79 kg)	Fr	Olympus	Salt Lake City, UT
G	3	Te'Jon Lucas	6 ft 1 in (1.85 m)	187 lb (85 kg)	GS	Washington; Illinois; Milwaukee	Milwaukee, WI
F	4	Atiki Ally Atiki	6 ft 9 in (2.06 m)	213 lb (97 kg)	Fr	London Basketball Academy (Ontario, Canada)	Mwanza, Tanzania
F	5	Gideon George	6 ft 6 in (1.98 m)	210 lb (95 kg)	Sr	New Mexico JC	Minna, Nigeria
G	10	Nate Hansen	6 ft 3 in (1.91 m)	178 lb (81 kg)	Fr	Timpview	Provo, UT
G	13	Alex Barcello	6 ft 2 in (1.88 m)	192 lb (87 kg)	GS	Corona del Sol; Arizona	Chandler, AZ
G	20	Spencer Johnson	6 ft 5 in (1.96 m)	185 lb (84 kg)	RS Jr	American Fork; Weber State; Utah Valley; Salt Lake CC	American Fork, UT
G	21	Trevin Knell	6 ft 5 in (1.96 m)	197 lb (89 kg)	Jr	Woods Cross	Woods Cross, UT
F	24	Seneca Knight	6 ft 6 in (1.98 m)	224 lb (102 kg)	Jr	Northside; San Jose State; LSU	New Orleans, Louisiana
F	33	Caleb Lohner	6 ft 8 in (2.03 m)	235 lb (107 kg)	So	Wasatch Academy	Dallas, TX
G	40	Paora Winitana (W)	6 ft 5 in (1.96 m)	242 lb (110 kg)	Fr	American Heritage	Hawkes Bay, New Zealand
C	42	Richard Harward (injured)	6 ft 11 in (2.11 m)	256 lb (116 kg)	RS Sr	Orem; Utah Valley	Orem, UT
F	45	Fousseyni Traore	6 ft 6 in (1.98 m)	254 lb (115 kg)	Fr	Wasatch Academy	Bamako, Mali
F	51	Gavin Baxter (injured)	6 ft 9 in (2.06 m)	228 lb (103 kg)	Sr	Timpview	Provo, UT
G	55	Casey Brown (W)	6 ft 1 in (1.85 m)	181 lb (82 kg)	Fr	Pleasant Grove High School	Lindon, UT

Head coach

- Mark Pope (Kentucky)

Assistant coach(es)

- Chris Burgess (Utah)
- Cody Fueger (Utah)
- Nick Robinson (Stanford)

Legend

- (C) Team captain
- (S) Suspended
- (I) Ineligible
- (W) Walk-on
- Injured
- Current redshirt

Roster

== Media coverage ==
=== Radio ===
Greg Wrubell and Mark Durrant return to call men's basketball for the 2021–22 season. Jason Shepherd will act as the host for most games, though Ben Bagley will fill-in for Shepherd when he has women's soccer, baseball, or college basketball duties. Terry Nashif will fill-in for Durrant on a select number of games. Jarom Jordan filled-in for Wrubell Nov. 20 against Central Methodist when Wrubell had football duties, and Shepherd filled-in against Missouri State (Dec. 4) and Weber State (Dec. 18) when Greg had College Cup and Independence Bowl duties. Tyson Jex filled in for Durrant against Creighton (Dec. 11) after weather conditions prevented Durrant from making it to South Dakota.

Affiliates:

- BYU Radio- Flagship Station Nationwide (Dish Network 980, Sirius XM 143, KBYU 89.1 FM HD 2, TuneIn radio, and byuradio.org)
- KSL 102.7 FM and 1160 AM- (Salt Lake City / Provo, Utah and ksl.com)
- KSNA 100.7 FM - Blackfoot / Idaho Falls / Pocatello / Rexburg, Idaho (games)
- KSPZ 105.1 FM and 980 AM- Blackfoot / Idaho Falls / Pocatello / Rexburg, Idaho (coaches' shows)
- KMXD 100.5 FM- Monroe / Manti, Utah
- KSVC 980 AM- Richfield / Manti, Utah
- KDXU 94.9 FM and 890 AM- St. George, Utah

=== Television ===
In September 2019, the West Coast Conference (WCC) agreed to a multi-year deal through the 2026–27 season with ESPN and the CBS Sports Network to broadcast numerous basketball games each year. Previously, the WCC had an agreement with ESPN, but the new agreement adds additional television coverage of basketball games through the CBS Sports Network. Games broadcast on the CBS Sports Network are carried on channel 158 on the Dish Network, channel 221 on DirecTV and channel 269 on Xfinity. Under the terms of the deal, ESPN will broadcast 17 games during the regular season and the CBS Sports Network will broadcast a minimum of 9 games. ESPN will continue to broadcast the quarterfinals, semifinals and the championship game of the WCC tournament. BYU maintains the rights to broadcast home games on BYUtv (11.1 in Salt Lake City, Utah, channel 374 on the Dish Network, and channel 4369/9403 on DirecTV). Meanwhile, Stadium broadcasts will be simulcast on KJZZ or KMYU. The broadcasts became even more important after Sinclair sold KSTU, causing Stadium to leave the Digital 3 station.

== Schedule and results ==
Date time, TV	Rank^{#}	Opponent^{#}	Result	Record	Site (attendance) city, state
Exhibition
November 4, 2021*; 7:00 pm, BYUtv		Colorado Christian	W 63–45	–	Marriott Center (13,000); Provo, UT
Non-conference regular season
November 9, 2021*; 7:00 pm, BYUtv		Cleveland State	W 69–59	1–0	Marriott Center (13,173); Provo, UT
November 12, 2021*; 7:00 pm, BYUtv		San Diego State; Rivalry	W 66–60	2–0	Marriott Center (16,470); Provo, UT
November 16, 2021*; 7:00 pm, ESPN		vs. No. 12 Oregon; Phil Knight Invitational	W 81–49	3–0	Moda Center (4,400); Portland, OR
November 20, 2021*; 7:00 pm, BYUtv		Central Methodist	W 97–61	4–0	Marriott Center (15,220); Provo, UT
November 24, 2021*; 7:00 pm, BYUtv	No. 18	Texas Southern	W 81–64	5–0	Marriott Center (15,646); Provo, UT
November 27, 2021*; 7:30 pm, P12N	No. 18	at Utah; Deseret First Duel	W 75–64	6–0	Huntsman Center (11,443); Salt Lake City, UT
December 1, 2021*; 7:00 pm, BYUtv/ESPN+	No. 12	at Utah Valley; UCCU Crosstown Clash	L 65–72 ^{OT}	6–1	UCCU Center (7,503); Orem, UT
December 4, 2021*; 2:00 pm, CBSSN	No. 12	at Missouri State	W 74–68	7–1	JQH Arena (7,006); Springfield, MO
December 8, 2021*; 7:00 pm, BYUtv	No. 24	Utah State; Rivalry	W 82–71	8–1	Marriott Center (15,669); Provo, UT
December 11, 2021*; 10:00 am, FS1	No. 24	vs. Creighton	L 71–83	8–2	Sanford Pentagon (2,835); Sioux Falls, SD
December 18, 2021*; 6:00 pm, KJZZ/ESPN+		at Weber State	W 89–71	9–2	Dee Events Center (8,922); Ogden, UT
December 22, 2021*; 7:30 pm, ESPNU		vs. South Florida; Diamond Head Classic quarterfinals	W 54–39	10–2	Stan Sheriff Center (4,463); Honolulu, HI
December 23, 2021*; 8:00 pm, ESPN2		vs. Vanderbilt; Diamond Head Classic semifinals	L 67–69	10–3	Stan Sheriff Center (3,880); Honolulu, HI
December 25, 2021*; 4:30 p.m., ESPN2		vs. Liberty; Diamond Head Classic 3rd Place	W 80–75	11–3	Stan Sheriff Center (4,425); Honolulu, HI
December 30, 2021*; 7:00 pm, BYUtv		Westminster (UT)	W 65–53	12–3	Marriott Center (15,808); Provo, UT
WCC Regular Season
January 1, 2022; 8:00 pm, Stadium		at Portland	Canceled		Chiles Center; Portland, OR
January 6, 2022; 7:00 pm, BYUtv		Pacific	W 73–51	13–3 (1–0)	Marriott Center (13,584); Provo, UT
January 8, 2022; 8:00 pm, ESPN2		Saint Mary's	W 52–43	14–3 (2–0)	Marriott Center (17,554); Provo, UT
January 13, 2022; 9:00 p.m., ESPN2		at No. 2 Gonzaga; Rivalry	L 84–110	14–4 (2–1)	McCarthey Athletic Center (6,000); Spokane, WA
January 15, 2022; 9:00 pm, CBSSN		at San Francisco	W 71–69	15–4 (3–1)	War Memorial Gymnasium (2,133); San Francisco, CA
January 20, 2022; 7:00 pm, BYUtv		San Diego	W 79–71	16–4 (4–1)	Marriott Center (12,748); Provo, UT
January 22, 2022; 7:00 pm, BYUtv/Stadium		Portland	W 78–65	17–4 (5–1)	Marriott Center (14,837); Provo, UT
January 27, 2022; 9:00 pm, ESPNU		at Santa Clara	L 76–77	17–5 (5–2)	Leavey Center (1,100); Santa Clara, CA
January 29, 2022; 7:30 pm, ESPNU		at Pacific	L 73–76	17–6 (5–3)	Alex G. Spanos Center (2,521); Stockton, CA
February 3, 2022; 8:00 pm, CBSSN		San Francisco	L 59-73	17-7 (5-4)	Marriott Center (13,361); Provo, UT
February 5, 2022; 8:00 pm, ESPN		No. 2 Gonzaga; Rivalry	L 57–90	17–8 (5–5)	Marriott Center (18,987); Provo, UT
February 10, 2022; 9:00 pm, ESPNU		at Loyola Marymount	W 83–82 ^{OT}	18–8 (6–5)	Gersten Pavilion (1,090); Los Angeles, CA
February 12, 2022; 8:00 p.m., CBSSN		at Pepperdine	W 91–85	19–8 (7–5)	Firestone Fieldhouse (1,575); Malibu, CA
February 19, 2022; 8:00 pm, ESPN2		at Saint Mary's	L 64–69	19–9 (7–6)	University Credit Union Pavilion (3,500); Moraga, CA
February 24, 2022; 8:00 pm, CBSSN		Loyola Marymount	W 79–59	20–9 (8–6)	Marriott Center (12,559); Provo, UT
February 26, 2022; 6:00 pm, ESPNU		Pepperdine	W 75–59	21–9 (9–6)	Marriott Center (15,721); Provo, UT
WCC Tournament
March 4, 2022; 6:00 pm, BYUtv	(5)	vs. (8) Loyola Marymount; Second round	W 85–60	22–9	Orleans Arena (N/A); Paradise, NV
March 5, 2022; 7:30 pm, ESPN2	(5)	vs. (4) San Francisco; Third round	L 63–75	22–10	Orleans Arena (1,799); Paradise, NV
NIT
March 16, 2022*; 7:00 pm, ESPN+	(2)	Long Beach State; First Round – SMU bracket	W 93–72	23–10	Marriott Center (5,511); Provo, UT
March 19, 2022*; 7:00 pm, ESPN+	(2)	Northern Iowa; Second Round – SMU bracket	W 90–71	24–10	Marriott Center (7,554); Provo, UT
March 23, 2022*; 7:00 pm, ESPN2	(2)	(4) Washington State; Quarterfinals – SMU bracket	L 58–77	24–11	Marriott Center (11,148); Provo, UT
*Non-conference game. ^{#}Rankings from AP Poll. (#) Tournament seedings in parentheses. All times are in Mountain Time.

== Game summaries ==
Series Histories are adjusted for the second consecutive season. On the series history the 47 wins the NCAA had BYU forfeit during the 2015–16 and 2016–17 seasons aren't indicated. The forfeits are not added to the loss column. They are merely struck from the win column. All rankings are from the AP poll unless specifically indicated otherwise.

=== Blue/White Scrimmage ===
Broadcasters: Dave McCann, Blaine Fowler, & Spencer Linton
Starting Lineups:

- BYU White: Hunter Erickson, Spencer Johnson, Seneca Knight, Caleb Lohner, Gavin Baxter
- BYU Blue: Trey Stewart, Te'Jon Lucas, Gideon George, Trevin Knell, Richard Harward

BYUtv

Oct 29
7:05 p.m. MDT

Recap

BYU White	62–68	BYU Blue
Scoring by half: 41–43, 21–25
Pts: Fousseyni Traore 20; Rebs: Fousseyni Traore 11; Asts: Hunter Erickson, Caleb Lohner, Fousseyni Traore 3		Pts: Te'Jon Lucas 15; Rebs: Gideon George 6 Asts: Te'Jon Lucas 5

Marriott Center
Provo, UT
Attendance: 4,200
Referees: Not Listed

=== Exhibition: Colorado Christian ===
Broadcasters: Dave McCann, Blaine Fowler, & Spencer Linton
Starting Lineups:

- Colorado Christian: DJ McDonald, Isaiah Alanzo, Andy Stafford, Nic Zeil, Ross Williams
- BYU: Te'Jon Lucas, Gideon George, Alex Barcello, Caleb Lohner, Richard Harward

BYUtv

Nov 4
7:05 p.m. MDT

Recap

Colorado Christian Cougars	45–63	BYU Cougars
Scoring by half: 21–26, 24–37
Pts: DJ McDonald 12; Rebs: Nic Zeil 7 Asts: DJ McDonald 2		Pts: Alex Barcello 16; Rebs: Gideon George, Fousseyni Traore 6 Asts: Te'Jon Lucas 4

Marriott Center
Provo, UT
Attendance: 13,000
Referees: Scott DeBo, Layne Barney, Matt Basham

=== Cleveland State ===
Series History: First Meeting
Broadcasters: Dave McCann, Blaine Fowler, & Spencer Linton
Starting Lineups:

- Cleveland State: Craig Beaudion, Tre Gomillion, Torrey Patton, Deante Johnson, D'Moi Hodge
- BYU: Te'Jon Lucas, Gideon George, Alex Barcello, Caleb Lohner, Gavin Baxter

BYUtv

Nov 9
8:05 p.m. MST

Recap

Cleveland State Vikings	59–69	BYU Cougars
Scoring by half: 27–34, 32–35
Pts: Torrey Patton 14; Rebs: Tre Gomillion, Deante Johnson 7 Asts: Craig Beaudion 5		Pts: Alex Barcello 24; Rebs: Caleb Lohner 9 Asts: Alex Barcello 4

Marriott Center
Provo, UT
Attendance: 13,173
Referees: Wilson Holland, Mark Fulton, Travis Schatzman

=== San Diego State ===
Series History: BYU leads 49–26

Broadcasters: Dave McCann, Blaine Fowler, & Spencer Linton
Starting Lineups:

- San Diego State: Keshad Johnson, Adam Seiko, Matt Bradley, Trey Pulliam, Nathan Mensah
- BYU: Te'Jon Lucas, Gideon George, Alex Barcello, Caleb Lohner, Gavin Baxter

BYUtv

Nov 12
7:05 p.m. MST

Recap

San Diego State Aztecs	60–66	BYU Cougars
Scoring by half: 30–32, 30–34
Pts: Nathan Mensah 18; Rebs: Keshad Johnson 6 Asts: Trey Pulliam 4		Pts: Alex Barcello 17; Rebs: Caleb Lohner, Fousseyni Traore 8 Asts: Te'Jon Lucas 5

Marriott Center
Provo, UT
Attendance: 16,470
Referees: David Hall, Eric Curry, Larry Spaulding

=== Oregon ===
Series History: Oregon leads 14–9
Broadcasters: Roxy Bernstein & Sean Farnham
Starting Lineups:

- BYU: Te'Jon Lucas, Gideon George, Alex Barcello, Caleb Lohner, Gavin Baxter
- Oregon: Quincy Guerrier, Eric Williams Jr, Devion Harmon, Will Richardson, Jacob Young

ESPN

Nov 16
8:00 p.m. MST

Recap

BYU Cougars	81–49	#12/12 Oregon Ducks
Scoring by half: 37-18, 44-31
Pts: Alex Barcello 25; Rebs: Fousseyni Traore, Seneca Knight 6 Asts: Te'Jon Lucas, Seneca Knight, Spencer Johnson 3		Pts: Eric Williams Jr 12; Rebs: Quincy Guerrier, Franck Kepnang 4 Asts: Devion Harmon 3

Moda Center
Portland, OR
Attendance: 4,400
Referees: Not listed

=== Central Methodist ===
Series History: First Meeting

Broadcasters: Dave McCann & Blaine Fowler
Starting Lineups:

- Central Methodist: Tim Cameron, Isaiah May, Jonathan Brown, Fode Camara, Thomas Sowoolu
- BYU: Te'Jon Lucas, Gideon George, Alex Barcello, Caleb Lohner, Gavin Baxter

BYUtv

Nov 20
7:05 p.m. MST

Recap

Central Methodist Eagles	61–97	BYU Cougars
Scoring by half: 29–46, 32–51
Pts: Jonathan Brown 24; Rebs: Isaiah May 6 Asts: Tim Cameron 3		Pts: Caleb Lohner 19; Rebs: Gideon George, Caleb Lohner 7 Asts: Alex Barcello 7

Marriott Center
Provo, UT
Attendance: 15,220
Referees: Larry Spaulding, Tom Nally, Coban Lopez

=== Texas Southern ===
Series History: BYU leads 3–0
Broadcasters: Dave McCann, Blaine Fowler & Spencer Linton
Starting Lineups:

- Texas Southern: Yahuza Rasas, PJ Henry, Bryson Etienne, Justin Hopkins, Brison Gresham
- BYU: Te'Jon Lucas, Gideon George, Alex Barcello, Caleb Lohner, Gavin Baxter

BYUtv

Nov 16
7:05 p.m. MST

Recap

Texas Southern Tigers	64–81	#18/18 BYU Cougars
Scoring by half: 30-43, 34-38
Pts: PJ Henry 21; Rebs: Brison Gresham 7 Asts: Yahuza Rasas, PJ Henry 2		Pts: Te'Jon Lucas 18; Rebs: Gideon George 16; Asts: Te'Jon Lucas 7

Marriott Center
Provo, UT
Attendance: 15,646
Referees: David Hall, Tommy Nunez, Nate Harris

=== Utah ===
Series History: BYU leads 132–129

Broadcasters: Roxy Bernstein & Don MacLean
Starting Lineups:

- BYU: Te'Jon Lucas, Gideon George, Alex Barcello, Caleb Lohner, Gavin Baxter
- Utah: David Jenkins Jr., Both Gach, Riley Battin, Rollie Worster, Branden Carlson

P12 MTN

Nov 20
7:30 p.m. MST

Recap

#18/18 BYU Cougars	75–64	Utah Utes
Scoring by half: 27–29, 48–35
Pts: Te'Jon Lucas 18; Rebs: Caleb Lohner 12; Asts: Te'Jon Lucas 4		Pts: Branden Carlson 17; Rebs: Rollie Worster, Branden Carlson 6 Asts: Rollie Worster 5

Huntsman Center
Salt Lake City, UT
Attendance: 11,443
Referees: Randy McCall, Michael Irving, Kelly Pfeifer

=== Utah Valley ===
Series History: BYU leads 4–1
Broadcasters: Dave McCann, Blaine Fowler, & Spencer Linton
Starting Lineups:

- BYU: Te'Jon Lucas, Alex Barcello, Seneca Knight, Caleb Lohner, Gavin Baxter
- Utah Valley: Le'Tre Darthard, Blaze Nield, Connor Harding, Tim Fuller, Fardaws Aimaq

BYUtv

Dec 1
7:00 p.m. MST

Recap

#12/13 BYU Cougars	65–72 (OT)	Utah Valley Wolverines
Scoring by half: 24–22, 31–33 Overtime: 10–17
Pts: Alex Barcello 17; Rebs: Alex Barcello, Caleb Lohner 11; Asts: Te'Jon Lucas 8		Pts: Fardaws Aimaq, Justin Harmon 24; Rebs: Fardaws Aimaq 22; Asts: Fardaws Aimaq 4

UCCU Center
Orem, UT
Attendance: 7,503
Referees: Kevin Brill, Randy Richardson, Deron White

=== Missouri State ===
Series History: Series even 1–1

Broadcasters: John Sadak & Tim Doyle
Starting Lineups:

- BYU: Te'Jon Lucas, Alex Barcello, Trevin Knell, Seneca Knight, Caleb Lohner
- Missouri State: Isiaih Mosley, Ja'Monta Black, Donovan Clay, Keaton Hervey, Gaige Prim

CBSSN

Dec 4
3:15 p.m. CST

Recap

#12/13 BYU Cougars	74–64	Missouri State Bears
Scoring by half: 35–27, 39–41
Pts: Alex Barcello 21; Rebs: Caleb Lohner, Spencer Johnson 6 Asts: Te'Jon Lucas, Trevin Knell 2		Pts: Jaylen Minnett 19; Rebs: Donovan Clay 8 Asts: Lu'cye Patterson 2

JQH Arena
Springfield, MO
Attendance: 7,006
Referees: Kelly Self, Randy Heimerman, Jeff Malham

=== Utah State ===
Series History: BYU leads 143–92
Broadcasters: Dave McCann, Blaine Fowler, & Spencer Linton
Starting Lineups:

- Utah State: Brandon Horvath, RK Eytle-Rock, Rylan Jones, Brock Miller, Justin Bean
- BYU: Te'Jon Lucas, Alex Barcello, Trevin Knell, Seneca Knight, Caleb Lohner

BYUtv

Dec 8
7:00 p.m. MST

Recap

Utah State Aggies	71–82	#24/23 BYU Cougars
Scoring by half: 33–45, 38–37
Pts: Justin Bean 20; Rebs: Brandon Horvath, Justin Bean 7 Asts: Justin Bean 6		Pts: Alex Barcello 17; Rebs: Gideon George 7 Asts: Te'Jon Lucas 6

Marriott Center
Provo, UT
Attendance: 15,669
Referees: David Hall, Eric Curry, Michael Greenstein

=== Creighton ===
Series History: BYU leads 6–3

Broadcasters: Telly Hughes & Shon Morris
Starting Lineups:

- BYU: Te'Jon Lucas, Alex Barcello, Trevin Knell, Seneca Knight, Caleb Lohner
- Creighton: Ryan Nembhard, Alex O'Connell, Ryan Kalkbrenner, Arthur Kaluma, Ryan Hawkins

FS1

Dec 11
11:00 a.m. CST

Recap

#24/23 BYU Cougars	71–83	Creighton Bluejays
Scoring by half: 30–48, 41–35
Pts: Alex Barcelo 28; Rebs: Gideon George 11; Asts: Alex Barcello 4		Pts: Ryan Hawkins 25; Rebs: Ryan Kalkbrenner 9 Asts: Rati Andronikashvili 3

Sanford Pentagon
Sioux Falls, SD
Attendance: 2,835
Referees: Chris Rastatter, Jeff Clark, Greg Nixon

=== Weber State ===
Series History: BYU leads 33–11
Broadcasters: Dave Fox, Lance Allred, & Tim LaComb
Starting Lineups:

- BYU: Te'Jon Lucas, Atiki Ally Atiki, Alex Barcello, Trevin Knell, Caleb Lohner
- Weber State: Dillon Jones, Seikou Sisoho Jawara, Koby McEwen, Alex Tew, JJ Overton

KJZZ

Dec 18
6:00 p.m. MST

Recap

BYU Cougars	89–71	Weber State Wildcats
Scoring by half: 41–33, 48–38
Pts: Alex Barcello 23; Rebs: Caleb Lohner 8 Asts: Te'Jon Lucas 6		Pts: Dillon Jones 20; Rebs: Dillon Jones 11; Asts: Seikou Sisoho Jawara 4

Dee Events Center
Ogden, UT
Attendance: 8,922
Referees: Doran Gotschall, Kevin Brill, Larry Spaulding

=== South Florida ===
Series History: BYU leads 1–0

Broadcasters: Roxy Bernstein & Corey Williams
Starting Lineups:

- BYU: Te'Jon Lucas, Atiki Ally Atiki, Alex Barcello, Trevin Knell, Caleb Lohner
- South Florida: Javon Greene, Bayron Matos, Sam Hines Jr., Caleb Murphy, Jamie Chaplin

ESPNU

Dec 11
4:30 p.m. HAST

Recap

BYU Cougars	54–39	USF Bulls
Scoring by half: 31–22, 23–17
Pts: Gideon George 11; Rebs: Caleb Lohner 14; Asts: Te'Jon Lucas 7		Pts: Javon Greene 9 Rebs: Jamie Chaplin 6 Asts: Javon Greene 3

Stan Sheriff Center
Honolulu, HI
Attendance: 4,463
Referees: Michael Greenstein, Kevin Brill, Brooks Wells

=== Vanderbilt ===
Series History: Vanderbilt leads 1–0
Broadcasters: Roxy Bernstein & Corey Williams
Starting Lineups:

- BYU: Te'Jon Lucas, Atiki Ally Atiki, Alex Barcello, Trevin Knell, Caleb Lohner
- Vanderbilt: Scotty Pippen Jr., Rodney Chatman, Jordan Wright, Myles Stute, Quentin Millora-Brown

ESPN2

Dec 23
5:00 p.m. HAST

Recap

BYU Cougars	67–69	Vanderbilt Commodores
Scoring by half: 35–30, 32–39
Pts: Alex Barcello 15; Rebs: Fousseyni Traore 15; Asts: Te'Jon Lucas 4		Pts: Scotty Pippen Jr. 23; Rebs: Quentin Millora-Brown 10; Asts: Scotty Pippen Jr., Quentin Millora-Brown 3

Stan Sheriff Center
Honolulu, HI
Attendance: 3,880
Referees: Keith Kimble, Marques Pettigrew, Bart Lenox

=== Liberty ===
Series History: BYU leads 6–3

Broadcasters: Roxy Bernstein & Corey Williams
Starting Lineups:

- Liberty: Darius McGhee, Keegan McDowell, Kyle Rode, Joseph Venzant, Shiloh Robinson
- BYU: Te'Jon Lucas, Alex Barcello, Trevin Knell, Caleb Lohner, Fousseyni Traore

ESPN2

Dec 25
1:30 p.m. HAST

Recap

Liberty Flames	75–80	BYU Cougars
Scoring by half: 33–32, 42–48
Pts: Darius McGhee 29; Rebs: Keegan McDowell 8 Asts: Darius McGhee 5		Pts: Fousseyni Traore 19; Rebs: Fousseyni Traore 13; Asts: Te'Jon Lucas 7

Stan Sheriff Center
Honolulu, HI
Attendance: 4,425
Referees: Michael Greenstein, Marques Pettigrew, Todd Apo

=== Westminster ===
Series History: BYU leads 1–0
Broadcasters: Dave McCann, Kristen Kozlowski & Spencer Linton
Starting Lineups:

- Westminster: Matt Kitzman, Donaval Avila, Reme Torbert, Brayden Johnson, Lewis Johnson
- BYU: Te'Jon Lucas, Alex Barcello, Trevin Knell, Caleb Lohner, Fousseyni Traore

BYUtv

Dec 29
7:00 p.m. MST

Recap

Westminster Griffins	53–65	BYU Cougars
Scoring by half: 24–29, 29–36
Pts: Lewis Johnson 13; Rebs: Brayden Johnson 8 Asts: Matt Kitzman, Taylor Miller 3		Pts: Gideon George 17; Rebs: Gideon George 8 Asts: Te'Jon Lucas, Alex Barcello 5

Marriott Center
Provo, UT
Attendance: 15,808
Referees: Randy McCall, Chris Rastatter, Mike Reed

=== Pacific ===
Series History: BYU leads 12–6
Broadcasters: Dave McCann, Blaine Fowler & Spencer Linton
Starting Lineups:

- Pacific: Khaleb Wilson-Rouse, Pierre Crockrell II, Alphonso Anderson, Sam Freeman, Luke Avdalovic
- BYU: Te'Jon Lucas, Alex Barcello, Trevin Knell, Caleb Lohner, Fousseyni Traore

BYUtv

Jan 6
7:05 p.m. MST

Recap

Pacific Tigers	51–73	BYU Cougars
Scoring by half: 31–35, 20–38
Pts: Luke Avdalovic 12; Rebs: Jordan Bell 7 Asts: Pierre Crockrell II, Jordan Bell 3		Pts: Alex Barcello 15; Rebs: Fousseyni Traore 11; Asts: Alex Barcello, Spencer Johnson 4

Marriott Center
Provo, UT
Attendance: 13,584
Referees: Verne Harris, Rick Batsell, Crystal Hogan

=== Saint Mary's ===
Series History: Series even 16–16
Broadcasters: Eric Rothman & Sean Farnham
Starting Lineups:

- Saint Mary's: Logan Johnson, Augustas Marciulionis, Matthias Tass, Kyle Bowen, Alex Ducas
- BYU: Te'Jon Lucas, Alex Barcello, Trevin Knell, Caleb Lohner, Fousseyni Traore

ESPN2

Jan 8
8:05 p.m. MST

Recap

Saint Mary's Gaels	42–53	BYU Cougars
Scoring by half: 16–28, 27–24
Pts: Matthias Tass 13; Rebs: Matthias Tass 15; Asts: Logan Johnson 5		Pts: Te'Jon Lucas 10; Rebs: Fousseyni Traore 11; Asts: Alex Barcello 4

Marriott Center
Provo, UT
Attendance: 17,554
Referees: Tony Padilla, Larry Spaulding, Klaus Endrissat

=== Gonzaga ===
Series History: Gonzaga leads 21–5
Broadcasters: Dave Flemming & Jay Bilas
Starting Lineups:

- BYU: Te'Jon Lucas, Alex Barcello, Trevin Knell, Caleb Lohner, Fousseyni Traore
- Gonzaga: Julian Strawther, Drew Timme, Andrew Nembhard, Chet Holmgren, Rasir Bolton

ESPN2

Jan 13
8 p.m. PST

Recap

BYU Cougars	84–110	#2/2 Gonzaga Bulldogs
Scoring by half: 49–61, 35–49
Pts: Alex Barcello 19; Rebs: Fousseyni Traore 8 Asts: Alex Barcello, Te'Jon Lucas 4		Pts: Drew Timme 30; Rebs: Chet Holmgren 7 Asts: Andrew Nembhard 12

McCarthey Athletic Center
Spokane, WA
Attendance: 6,000
Referees: Gregory Nixon, Michael Greenstein, Scott Brown

=== San Francisco ===
Series History: BYU leads 21–9
Broadcasters: Chris Lewis & Steve Lappas
Starting Lineups:

- BYU: Te'Jon Lucas, Alex Barcello, Trevin Knell, Caleb Lohner, Fousseyni Traore
- San Francisco: Khalil Shabazz, Jamaree Bouyea, Patrick Tape, Gabe Stefanini, Yauhen Massalski

CBSSN

Jan 15
8 p.m. PST

Recap

BYU Cougars	71–69	San Francisco Dons
Scoring by half: 27–28, 44–41
Pts: Alex Barcello 18; Rebs: Fousseyni Traore 9 Asts: Te'Jon Lucas 5		Pts: Jamaree Bouyea 19; Rebs: Jamaree Bouyea, Patrick Tape, Yauhen Massalski 7 Asts: Gabe Stefanini 3

The Sobrato Center
San Francisco, CA
Attendance: 2,133
Referees: Chis Rastatter, Jim Schipper, Marc A. Beasley

=== San Diego ===
Series History: BYU leads 15–6
Broadcasters: Dave McCann, Blaine Fowler, & Spencer Linton
Starting Lineups:

- San Diego:Joey Calcaterra, Wayne McKinney III, Josh Parrish, Marcellus Earlington, Terrell Brown
- BYU: Te'Jon Lucas, Alex Barcello, Trevin Knell, Caleb Lohner, Fousseyni Traore

BYUtv

Jan 20
7:05 p.m. MST

Recap

San Diego Toreros	71–79	BYU Cougars
Scoring by half: 31–31, 40–48
Pts: Jase Townsend 14; Rebs: Marcellus Earlington 7 Asts: Jase Townsend 3		Pts: Alex Barcello 22; Rebs: Fouysseni Traore 11; Asts: Te'Jon Lucas 4

Marriott Center
Provo, UT
Attendance: 12,748
Referees: Mike Scyphers, Randy Richardson, Nate Harris

=== Portland ===
Series History: BYU leads 21–2
Broadcasters: Dave McCann, Blaine Fowler, & Spencer Linton
Starting Lineups:

- Portland: Moses Wood, Tyler Robertson, Chris Austin, Chika Nduka, Mike Meadows
- BYU: Te'Jon Lucas, Alex Barcello, Trevin Knell, Caleb Lohner, Fousseyni Traore

BYUtv/Stadium

Jan 22
7:05 p.m. MST

Recap

Portland Pilots	65–78	BYU Cougars
Scoring by half: 34–39, 31–39
Pts: Tyler Robertson 15; Rebs: Moses Wood 10; Asts: Tyler Robertson 4		Pts: Te'Jon Lucas 16; Rebs: Fousseyni Traore 10; Asts: Te'Jon Lucas 7

Marriott Center
Provo, UT
Attendance: 14,837
Referees: Deron White, Rick O'Neill, Ryan Holmes

=== Santa Clara ===
Series History: BYU leads 28–6
Broadcasters: Dave Flemming & Sean Farnham
Starting Lineups:

- BYU: Te'Jon Lucas, Alex Barcello, Trevin Knell, Caleb Lohner, Fousseyni Traore
- Santa Clara: PJ Pipes, Josip Vrankic, Keshawn Justice, Parker Braun, Jalen Williams

ESPNU

Jan 27
8:00 p.m. PST

Recap

BYU Cougars	76–77	Santa Clara Broncos
Scoring by half: 39–37, 37–40
Pts: Alex Barcello 20; Rebs: Fousseyni Traore 15; Asts: Alex Barcello 4		Pts: Jalen Williams 26; Rebs: Parker Braun 10; Asts: Josip Vrankic 4

Leavey Center
Santa Clara, CA
Attendance: 1,100
Referees: Tommy Nunez, Deldre Carr, Scott Brown

=== Pacific ===
Series History: BYU leads 13–6
Broadcasters: Eric Rothman & Richie Schueler
Starting Lineups:

- BYU: Te'Jon Lucas, Alex Barcello, Trevin Knell, Caleb Lohner, Fousseyni Traore
- Pacific: Khaleb Wilson-Rouse, Pierre Crockrell II, Alphonso Anderson, Sam Freeman, Luke Avdalovic

ESPNU

Jan 29
5:30 p.m. PST

Recap

BYU Cougars	73–76	Pacific Tigers
Scoring by half: 28–33, 45–44
Pts: Te'Jon Lucas, Gideon George 13; Rebs: Fousseyni Traore 7 Asts: Alex Barcello, Seneca Knight 2		Pts: Nick Blake 20; Rebs: Jeremiah Bailey 11; Asts: Alphonso Anderson 7

Alex G. Spanos Center
Stockton, CA
Attendance: 2,521
Referees: Wilson Holland, Randy Richardson, Klaus Endrissat

=== San Francisco ===
Series History: BYU leads 22–9
Broadcasters: John Sadak & Bob Wenzel
Starting Lineups:

- San Francisco: Khalil Shabazz, Jamaree Bouyea, Patrick Tape, Gabe Stefanini, Yauhen Massalski
- BYU: Te'Jon Lucas, Gideon George, Alex Barcello, Trevin Knell, Fousseyni Traore

CBSSN

Feb 3
8:05 p.m. MST

Recap

San Francisco Dons	73–59	BYU Cougars
Scoring by half: 40–25, 33–34
Pts: Yauhen Massalski 16; Rebs: Yauhen Massalski 13; Asts: Jamaree Bouyea 4		Pts: Alex Barcello 25; Rebs: Caleb Lohner 6 Asts: Te'Jon Lucas, Alex Barcello, Fousseyni Traore 2

Marriott Center
Provo, UT
Attendance: 13,361
Referees: Randy McCall, Rick O'Neill, Jeff Wooten

=== Gonzaga ===
Series History: Gonzaga leads 22–5
Broadcasters: Dave Flemming, Sean Farnham, & Molly McGrath
Starting Lineups:

- Gonzaga: Julian Strawther, Drew Timme, Andrew Nembhard, Chet Holmgren, Rasir Bolton
- BYU: Gideon George, Alex Barcello, Trevin Knell, Seneca Knight, Fousseyni Traore

ESPN

Feb 5
8:05 p.m. MST

Recap

#2/1 Gonzaga Bulldogs	90–57	BYU Cougars
Scoring by half: 47–23, 43–34
Pts: Chet Holmgren 20; Rebs: Chet Holmgren 17; Asts: Chet Holmgren 6		Pts: Gideon George 14; Rebs: Caleb Lohner 9 Asts: Alex Barcello 5

Marriott Center
Provo, UT
Attendance: 18,987
Referees: Chris Rastatter, Michael Greenstein, Deron White

=== Loyola Marymount ===
Series History: BYU leads 14–4
Broadcasters: Dave Flemming & Sean Farnham
Starting Lineups:

- BYU: Te'Jon Lucas, Gideon George, Alex Barcello, Seneca Knight, Fousseyni Traore
- Loyola Marymount: Eli Scott, Joe Quintana, Cam Shelton, Alex Merkviladze, Keli Leaupepe

ESPNU

Feb 10
8:05 p.m. PST

Recap

BYU Cougars	83–82 (OT)	Loyola Marymount Lions
Scoring by half: 33–45, 43–31 Overtime: 7–6
Pts: Fousseyni Traore 19; Rebs: Fousseyni Traore 12; Asts: Te'Jon Lucas 9		Pts: Keli Leaupepe 26; Rebs: Keli Leaupepe 7 Asts: Eli Scott, Cam Shelton, Alex Merkviladze 4

Gersten Pavilion
Los Angeles, CA
Attendance: 1,090
Referees: Michael Irving, Larry Spaulding, Scott Brown

=== Pepperdine ===
Series History: BYU leads 16–10
Broadcasters: Rich Waltz & Steve Wolf
Starting Lineups:

- BYU: Gideon George, Alex Barcello, Trevin Knell, Seneca Knight, Caleb Lohner
- Pepperdine: Houston Mallette, Mike Mitchell Jr., Carson Basham, Maxwell Lewis, Jan Zidek

CBSSN

Feb 12
7:05 p.m. PST

Recap

BYU Cougars	91–85	Pepperdine Waves
Scoring by half: 48–38, 43–47
Pts: Alex Barcello 33; Rebs: Atiki Ally Atiki 8 Asts: Te'Jon Lucas 7		Pts: Houston Mallette 31; Rebs: Carson Basham, Jan Zidek 4 Asts: Mike Mitchell Jr., Darryl Polk Jr. 7

Firestone Fieldhouse
Malibu, CA
Attendance: 1,575
Referees: Coban Lopez, Tom Nally, Klaus Endrissat

=== Saint Mary's ===
Series History: BYU leads 17–16
Broadcasters: Dave Flemming & Sean Farnham
Starting Lineups:

- BYU: Te'Jon Lucas, Gideon George, Alex Barcello, Seneca Knight, Fousseyni Traore
- Saint Mary's: Logan Johnson, Matthias Tass, Tommy Kuhse, Kyle Bowen, Alex Ducas

ESPN2

Feb 19
7:05 p.m. PST

Recap

BYU Cougars	64–69	Saint Mary's Gaels
Scoring by half: 30–34, 34–35
Pts: Alex Barcello 22; Rebs: Caleb Lohner 11; Asts: Te'Jon Lucas 4		Pts: Tommy Kuhse 25; Rebs: Matthias Tass 7 Asts: Tommy Kuhse 4

University Credit Union Pavilion
Moraga, CA
Attendance: 3,500
Referees: Tony Padilla, Glen Mayberry, Jeff Wooten

=== Loyola Marymount ===
Series History: BYU leads 15–4
Broadcasters: John Sadak, Chris Walker, & John Hollinger
Starting Lineups:

- Loyola Marymount: Eli Scott, Joe Quintana, Jalin Anderson, Cam Shelton, Alex Merkviladze
- BYU: Te'Jon Lucas, Gideon George, Alex Barcello, Caleb Lohner, Fousseyni Traore

CBSSN

Feb 24
8:05 p.m. MST

Recap

Loyola Marymount Lions	59–79	BYU Cougars
Scoring by half: 28–45, 31–34
Pts: Alex Merkviladze 15; Rebs: Alex Merkviladze 8 Asts: Jalin Anderson 4		Pts: Te'Jon Lucas 14; Rebs: Caleb Lohner 11; Asts: Alex Barcello 7

Marriott Center
Provo, UT
Attendance: 12,559
Referees: Chris Rastatter, Kelly Pfeifer, Jimmy Casas

=== Pepperdine ===
Series History: BYU leads 17–10
Broadcasters: Eric Rothman & Dane Bradshaw
Starting Lineups:

- Pepperdine: Houston Mallette, Mike Mitchell Jr., Carson Basham, Victor Ohia Obioha, Jay Yoon
- BYU: Te'Jon Lucas, Gideon George, Alex Barcello, Caleb Lohner, Fousseyni Traore

ESPNU

Feb 26
6:05 p.m. MST

Recap

Pepperdine Waves	59–75	BYU Cougars
Scoring by half: 33-36, 26-39
Pts: Houston Mallette 23; Rebs: Carson Basham, Mike Mitchell Jr. 6 Asts: Mike Mitchell Jr. 8		Pts: Fousseyni Traore 25; Rebs: Fousseyni Traore 19; Asts: Te'Jon Lucas, Trevin Knell 4

Marriott Center
Provo, UT
Attendance: 15,721
Referees: Larry Spaulding, Rick O'Neill, Daryl Gelinas

=== WCC 2nd Round: Loyola Marymount ===
Series History: BYU leads 16–4
Broadcasters: Dave McCann & Blaine Fowler
Starting Lineups:

- Loyola Marymount: Eli Scott, Joe Quintana, Lamaj Lewis, Cam Shelton, Alex Merkviladze
- BYU: Te'Jon Lucas, Gideon George, Alex Barcello, Caleb Lohner, Fousseyni Traore

BYUtv

Mar 4
7:00 p.m. MST

Recap

Loyola Marymount Lions	60–85	BYU Cougars
Scoring by half: 28–43, 32–42
Pts: Eli Scott 24; Rebs: Eli Scott 6 Asts: Jalin Anderson 3		Pts: Alex Barcello 22; Rebs: Fousseyni Traore 11; Asts: Te'Jon Lucas 4

Orleans Arena
Las Vegas, NV
Referees: Randy McCall, Michael Greenstein, Eric Curry

=== WCC 3rd Round: San Francisco ===
Series History: BYU leads 22–10
Broadcasters: Dave Flemming & Sean Farnham
Starting Lineups:

- BYU: Te'Jon Lucas, Gideon George, Alex Barcello, Caleb Lohner, Fousseyni Traore
- San Francisco: Khalil Shabazz, Jamaree Bouyea, Patrick Tape, Gabe Stefanini, Yauhen Massalski

ESPN2

Mar 5
6:05 p.m. MST

Recap

BYU Cougars	63–75	San Francisco Dons
Scoring by half: 24-27, 39-48
Pts: Alex Barcello 18; Rebs: Fousseyni Traore 12; Asts: Te'Jon Lucas 4		Pts: Khalil Shabazz 22; Rebs: Yauhen Massalski 9 Asts: Jamaree Bouyea 4

Orleans Arena
Las Vegas, NV
Attendance: 1,799
Referees: Tommy Nunez, Coban Lopez, Klaus Endrissat

=== NIT 1st Round: Long Beach State ===
Series History: BYU leads 6–5
Broadcasters: Roxy Bernstein & Corey Williams
Starting Lineups:

- Long Beach State: Jordan Roberts, Drew Cobb, Joel Murray, Jadon Jones, Colin Slater
- BYU: Te'Jon Lucas, Gideon George, Alex Barcello, Caleb Lohner, Fousseyni Traore

ESPN+

Mar 4
7:05 p.m. MST

Recap

Long Beach State Beach	72–93	BYU Cougars
Scoring by half: 46–41, 26–52
Pts: Joel Murray 24; Rebs: Jadon Jones 7 Asts: Joel Murray 2		Pts: Caleb Lohner 20; Rebs: Atiki Ally Atiki 9 Asts: Te'Jon Lucas 7

Marriott Center
Provo, UT
Attendance: 5,511
Referees: Randy Heimerman, Ryan Holmes, Hames Schipper

=== NIT 2nd Round: Northern Iowa ===
Series History: BYU leads 1–0
Broadcasters: Roxy Bernstein & Corey Williams
Starting Lineups:

- UNI: Nate Heise, Tywhon Pickford, AJ Green, Trae Berhow, Noah Carter
- BYU: Te'Jon Lucas, Gideon George, Alex Barcello, Caleb Lohner, Fousseyni Traore

ESPN+

Mar 19
7:05 p.m. MST

Recap

UNI Panthers	71–90	BYU Cougars
Scoring by half: 42–47, 29–43
Pts: Noah Carter 24; Rebs: Trae Berhow 7 Asts: AJ Green 5		Pts: Gideon George 27; Rebs: Fousseyni Traore 7 Asts: Te'Jon Lucas 8

Marriott Center
Provo, UT
Attendance: 7,554
Referees: Deron White, Frank Harvey, Jimmy Casas

=== NIT Quarterfinal: Washington State ===
Series History: Series even 5–5
Broadcasters: Dave Feldman & Perry Clark
Starting Lineups:

- Washington State: Efe Abogidi, Tyrell Roberts, TJ Bamba, Michael Flowers, Mouhamed Flowers
- BYU: Te'Jon Lucas, Gideon George, Alex Barcello, Caleb Lohner, Fousseyni Traore

ESPN2

Mar 23
7:05 p.m. MST

Recap

Washington State Cougars	77–58	BYU Cougars
Scoring by half: 35–26, 42–32
Pts: Michael Flowers 27; Rebs: DJ Rodman 8 Asts: Michael Flowers 5		Pts: Fousseyni Traore 16; Rebs: Caleb Lohner 11; Asts: Caleb Lohner 5

Marriott Center
Provo, UT
Attendance: 11,148
Referees: Rick Batsell, Brooks Wells, Kevin Brill

== Rankings ==
Ranking movements Legend: ██ Increase in ranking ██ Decrease in ranking — = Not ranked RV = Received votes
	Week																			
Poll	Pre	1	2	3	4	5	6	7	8	9	10	11	12	13	14	15	16	17	18	Final
AP	RV	RV	18	12	24	RV	RV	—	—	RV	RV	RV	RV	—	—	—	—	—	—	—
Coaches	—	—^	18	13	23	RV	RV	—	RV	RV	RV	RV	RV	—	—	—	—	—	—	—

^The Coaches poll did not release a week 1 ranking.

== See also ==
For additional BYU sports info,
