= Jaxson Robinson =

American basketball player (born 2002)

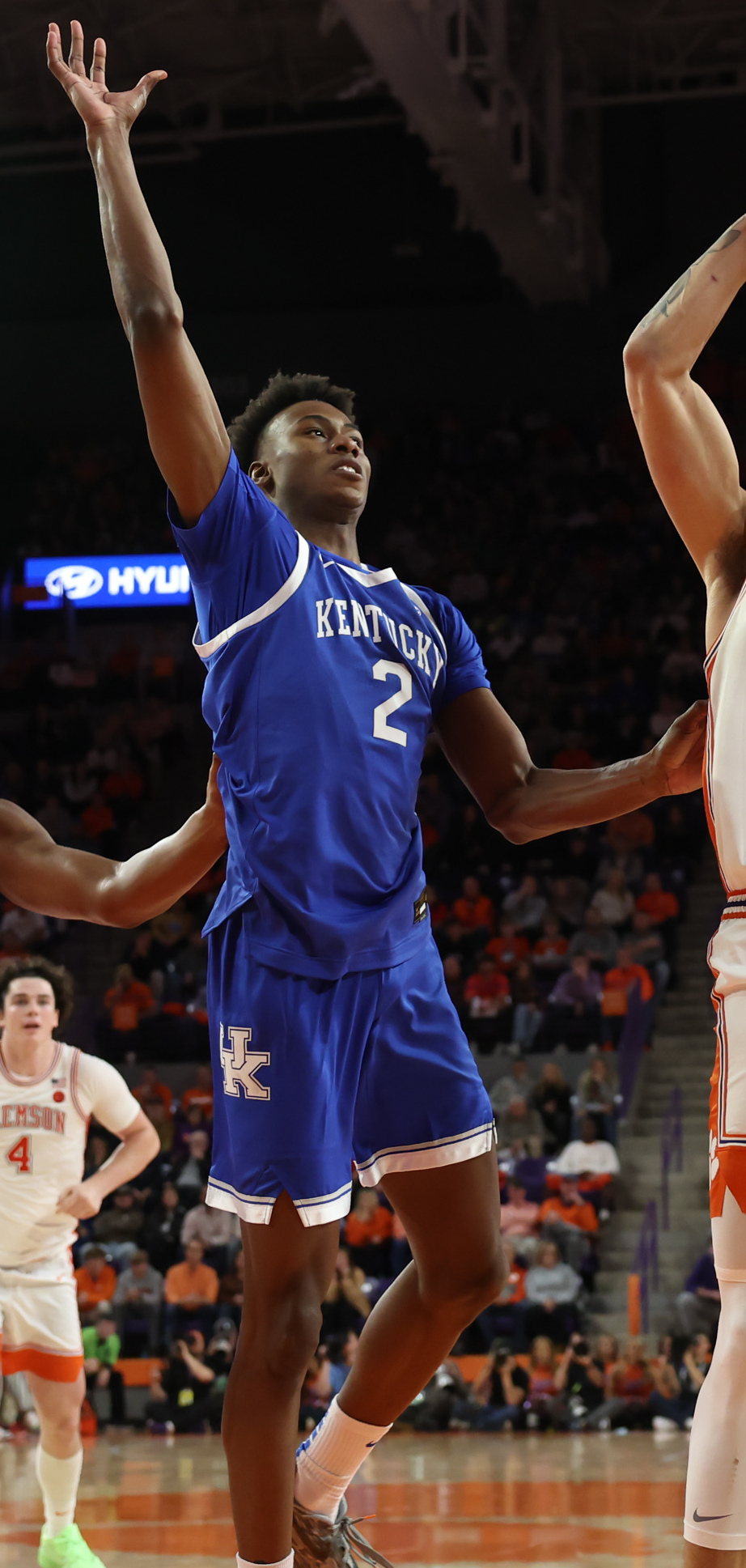

No. 2 – Cleveland Charge
- Position: Shooting guard / small forward
- League: NBA G League

Personal information
- Born: December 3, 2002 (age 23) Durant, Oklahoma, U.S.
- Listed height: 6 ft 7 in (2.01 m)
- Listed weight: 192 lb (87 kg)

Career information
- High school: Ada (Ada, Oklahoma)
- College: Texas A&M (2020–2021); Arkansas (2021–2022); BYU (2022–2024); Kentucky (2024–2025)
- NBA draft: 2025: undrafted
- Playing career: 2025–present

Career history
- 2025–present: Cleveland Charge

Career highlights
- Big 12 Sixth Man of the Year (2024)
- Stats at NBA.com
- Stats at Basketball Reference

Jaxson Robinson (born December 3, 2002) is an American professional basketball player for the Cleveland Charge of the NBA G League. He played college basketball for the Texas A&M Aggies, Arkansas Razorbacks, BYU Cougars and Kentucky Wildcats.

== Early life ==
Robinson grew up in Ada, Oklahoma, and attended Ada High School where he was a standout basketball player. He was ranked a top 50 recruit nationally and helped the team qualify for the state tournament as a junior while averaging 15.4 points and 5.6 rebounds per game. He was named the Area Player of the Year by The Ada News. A four-star prospect and ranked the top player in the state, Robison graduated a year early and reclassified to 2020 while committing to play for the Texas A&M Aggies. In high school, Robinson also played for Team Griffin of the Nike Elite Youth Basketball League (EYBL) and helped them win the U16 Peach Jam tournament.

== College career ==
As a true freshman with the Aggies in the 2020–21 season, Robinson appeared in 14 games as a reserve, totaling 2.6 points per game. He transferred to the Arkansas Razorbacks after the season and started four games while having 3.4 points and 1.3 rebounds per game. He transferred a second time after his only year at Arkansas, joining the BYU Cougars for the 2022–23 season.

Robinson became a starter at BYU in 2022–23, ultimately starting 30 of 33 games while totaling a team-leading 61 three-pointers on the year, along with 8.5 points and 2.9 rebounds per game. He moved to a sixth man role in 2023–24 and had 14.2 points per game while helping the Cougars reach the NCAA Tournament. He was selected the Big 12 Conference Sixth Man of the Year.

Following the season he transferred to Kentucky. Robinson missed four straight games in February 2025 due to a wrist injury before returning in a game against Oklahoma. He re-aggravated the injury against the Sooners, ending his season and necessitating surgery. Robinson averaged 13.0 points and 3.5 rebounds per game, shooting nearly 38% from 3-point range.

== Professional career ==
After going undrafted in the 2025 NBA draft, Robinson was signed by the Cleveland Cavaliers on July 1. He was waived on September 25. He was then added to the training camp roster of the Cavs' NBA G League affiliate, the Cleveland Charge.

== Career statistics ==
Legend
GP	Games played	GS	Games started	MPG	Minutes per game
FG%	Field goal percentage	3P%	3-point field goal percentage	FT%	Free throw percentage
RPG	Rebounds per game	APG	Assists per game	SPG	Steals per game
BPG	Blocks per game	PPG	Points per game	**Bold**	Career high

=== College ===
Year	Team	GP	GS	MPG	FG%	3P%	FT%	RPG	APG	SPG	BPG	PPG
2020–21	Texas A&M	14	4	9.8	.355	.286	.000	1.1	.3	.2	.1	2.1
2021–22	Arkansas	16	4	10.2	.380	.326	**1.000**	1.3	.4	.1	.3	3.4
2022–23	BYU	**33**	**30**	**28.1**	.386	.343	.680	2.9	**1.8**	**.8**	**.5**	8.5
2023–24	BYU	**33**	6	26.4	.426	.354	.908	2.5	1.3	.7	.4	**14.2**
2024–25	Kentucky	24	24	**28.1**	**.432**	**.376**	.763	**3.5**	1.7	.6	**.5**	13.0
Career		120	68	23.1	.412	.351	.818	2.5	1.3	.6	.4	9.6

== Personal life ==
Robinson's aunt is basketball coach and former player Crystal Robinson; his mother also played college basketball.
