= Alex Barcello =

American basketball player (born 1998)

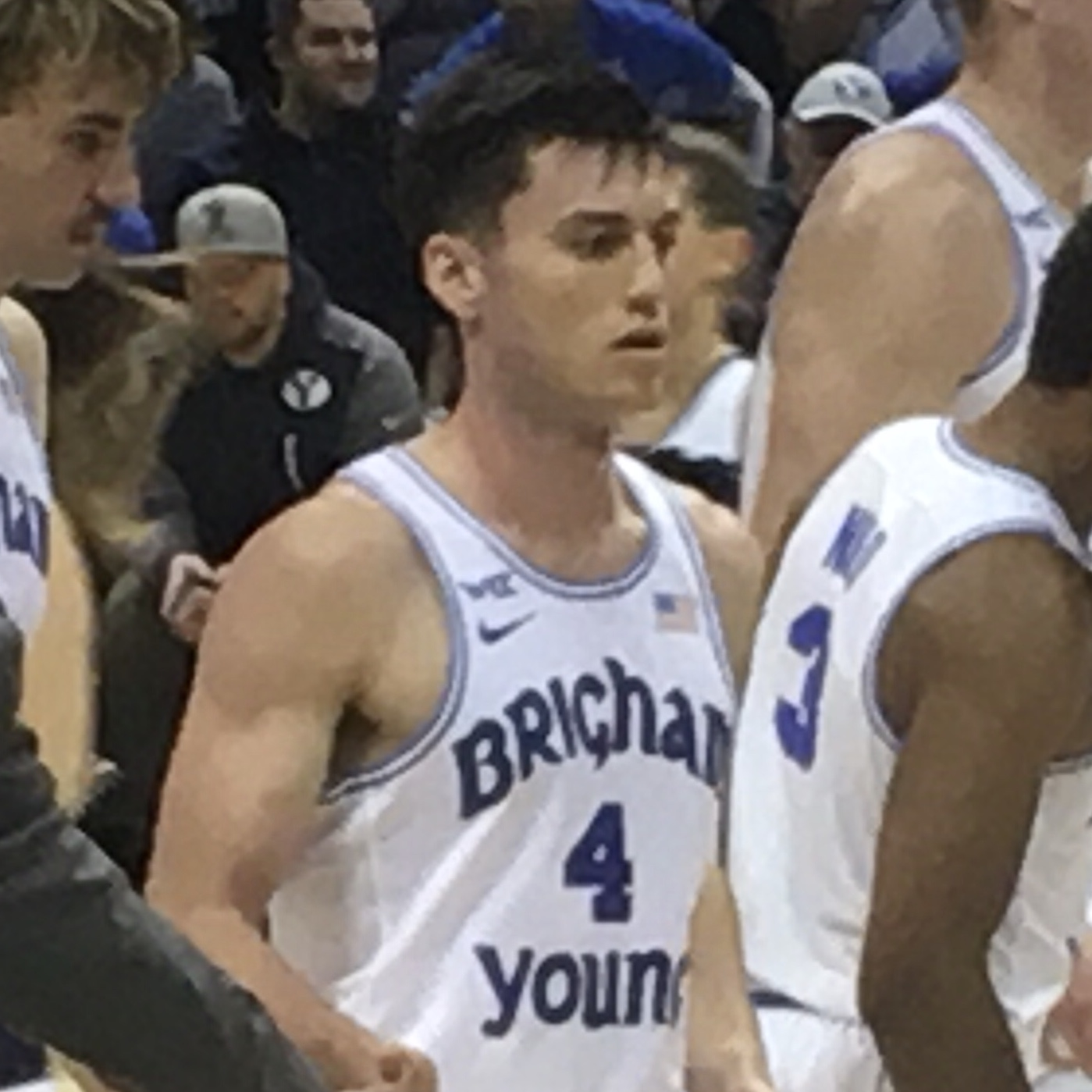
- Barcello with BYU in 2019

No. 28 – Monbus Obradoiro
- Position: Point guard
- League: Liga ACB

Personal information
- Born: August 31, 1998 (age 28) Phoenix, Arizona
- Listed height: 6 ft 2 in (1.88 m)
- Listed weight: 192 lb (87 kg)

Career information
- High school: Corona del Sol (Tempe, Arizona)
- College: Arizona (2017–2019); BYU (2019–2022)
- NBA draft: 2022: undrafted
- Playing career: 2022–present

Career history
- 2022: Kolossos Rodou
- 2022–2023: Oostende
- 2023–2024: Gipuzkoa Basket
- 2024–2025: USC Heidelberg
- 2025–present: Obradoiro

Career highlights
- Belgian League champion (2023); 2× First-team All-WCC (2021, 2022)

Alexander Barcello (born August 31, 1998) is an American professional basketball player for Monbus Obradoiro of the Liga ACB. He played college basketball for the BYU Cougars of the West Coast Conference (WCC) and for the Arizona Wildcats.

== Early life and high school career ==
Barcello was born in the metropolitan area of Phoenix, Arizona, to Edward and Shelli Barcello, who were both former basketball players. Edward "led the state in scoring his senior year at Phoenix Brophy Prep in 1987, graduating with more than 1,000 career points and second only to future Duke star and NBA player Mark Alarie (1982) as the school's all-time leading scorers." Shelli "was the leading rebounder and second-leading scorer on Canyon del Oro's undefeated state championship girls team in 1986–87." Barcello started playing basketball when he was two. He grew up with his three sisters, Sarah, Amanda and Julia.

Barcello played varsity basketball all four years at Corona del Sol High School in Tempe, Arizona to win two state championship titles.

As a freshman in 2013–14, he scored 15 points coming off the bench in the state championship game to help secure the school's third straight state title in overtime. In his sophomore season, he led the school to a 33–1 record and a second state title, and the Aztecs were ranked the consensus No. 3 team in the nation and when he was teammates with No. 1 2018 player Marvin Bagley III, who later transferred. Arizona coach Miller offered Barcello a scholarship after he poured in 51 points in a game as a sophomore against Gilbert Perry and Markus Howard.

In his junior season, in the state tournament, Barcello surpassed 1,000 points in only his second varsity season. He led his team to the Division I tournament as the top seed. In his senior season, Barcello scored 2,254 career points at Corona shooting over 55 percent from the field and almost 90 percent from the charity stripe. He tallied 31 points in his team's win over Christ the King in the Hoophall Classic. He also advanced to the finals of American Family Insurance National 3-Point Shooting Competition. He averaged 24.2 points, 3.0 assists and 5.8 rebounds per game.

=== Recruiting ===
Barcello was considered as one of the best players in the 2017 recruiting class by Scout, Rivals, 247Sports, and ESPN. He was a consensus four-star prospect in the Class of 2017 and committed to play at Arizona over offers from Virginia, Butler, Indiana and Stanford.

College recruiting
Name	Hometown	School	Height	Weight	Commit date
Alex Barcello; PG	Chandler, AZ	Corona del Sol (AZ)	6 ft 2 in (1.88 m)	170 lb (77 kg)	Aug 26, 2016
Alex Barcello; PG	Recruit ratings: Rivals: 247Sports: ESPN: (83)				
Overall recruit ranking: Rivals: 118 247Sports: 124 ESPN: 96
Note: In many cases, Scout, Rivals, 247Sports, On3, and ESPN may conflict in their listings of height and weight.; In these cases, the average was taken. ESPN grades are on a 100-point scale.; Sources: "Arizona 2017 Basketball Commitments". Rivals.; "2017 Arizona Wildcats Recruiting Class". ESPN.; "2017 Team Ranking". Rivals.

== College career ==
=== Arizona ===
In his freshman year at Arizona, Barcello appeared in 21 games from his point guard position. He had a season high of 11 points in their victory over LBSU, which included three makes on four attempts from beyond the arc. He opened his collegiate career with a strong three-game run of 7.7 points, 3.3 rebounds and 3.7 assists per game while shooting 58.3 percent from the field and 57.1 percent from three-point range. Alex scored knocked down a pair of critical baseline jumpers in their run in its win at Oregon State.

In his sophomore season at Arizona, he played in 30 of 32 games for the Wildcats. He registered three double-digit scoring games, opened the season with seven points and three rebounds in 15 minutes against Houston Baptist (11/17). He erupted for 16 points on 6 of 10 shooting in 13 minutes against Georgia Southern (11/29). He scored six points in six minutes at California (1/12/19). He scored seven points in 12 minutes at UCLA (1/25/19). He scored 12 points in 18 minutes at Utah (2/14/19). He notched his third double-digit scoring game of the season versus California (2/21/19), scoring 14 points in 18 minutes, going 7-of-7 from the free throw line. He earned a C.A.T.S. Academics Student-Athlete of the Month for February.

=== BYU ===
Barcello announced he planned to transfer from Arizona prior to the 2019–20 season. He opted to come to BYU where he received a waiver and played immediately instead of sitting out a season. Barcello scored 18 points in a 91–61 win over Weber State on December 21, 2019. He had 18 points and a career-high six three pointers, part of a BYU record 18 three pointers, in a 77–54 win over Loyola Marymount on February 14, 2020. In the regular season finale against Pepperdine, Barcello broke the left scaphoid bone in his wrist, which required surgery after the season was suspended. In his first season at BYU, Barcello averaged 9.3 points, 3.1 rebounds and 1.8 assists per game.

Coming into his senior season, Barcello was named to the Preseason All-West Coast Conference team. On February 25, 2021, Barcello scored a career-high 29 and hit 7-of-7 three-pointers, a program record, in a 79–73 win against San Francisco.

Barcello was again named to the First Team All-WCC in 2022.

== Professional career ==
On June 24, 2022, Barcello joined the Toronto Raptors for the 2022 NBA Summer League.

=== Kolossos H Hotels Rodou (2022) ===
On August 12, 2022, Barcello signed his first professional contract overseas with Kolossos Rhodes of the Greek Basket League. On November 7 of the same year, he mutually parted ways with the club.

=== Filou Oostende (2022–2023) ===
On November 7, 2022, he signed with Filou Oostende of the BNXT League.

=== Acunsa Gipuzkoa BC San Sebastian (2023–2024) ===
On August 10, 2023, Barcello signed with Gipuzkoa Basket of the Primera FEB.

On April 8, 2024, Barcello received Hoops Agents LEB Gold Player of the Week for Round 28. He had 39 points, 3 rebounds and 4 assists to lead his team to victory.

=== MLP Academics Heidelberg (2024–2025) ===
On July 17, 2024, he signed with USC Heidelberg of Basketball Bundesliga.

=== Obradoiro CAB (2025–present) ===
On February 26, 2025, Barcello signed with Obradoiro CAB of Primera FEB.

== Career statistics ==
Legend
GP	Games played	GS	Games started	MPG	Minutes per game
FG%	Field goal percentage	3P%	3-point field goal percentage	FT%	Free throw percentage
RPG	Rebounds per game	APG	Assists per game	SPG	Steals per game
BPG	Blocks per game	PPG	Points per game	**Bold**	Career high

=== College ===
Year	Team	GP	GS	MPG	FG%	3P%	FT%	RPG	APG	SPG	BPG	PPG
2017–18	Arizona	21	0	9.6	.391	.308	.750	1.0	.9	.1	.0	2.4
2018–19	Arizona	30	0	9.6	.393	.292	**.905**	.9	.5	.3	.0	3.3
2019–20	BYU	32	32	30.1	.493	**.486**	.879	3.1	1.8	.9	**.1**	9.3
2020–21	BYU	27	27	32.0	**.523**	.477	.856	**4.7**	**4.3**	**1.0**	.0	16.1
2021–22	BYU	**35**	**35**	**32.1**	.451	.421	.865	3.8	3.3	.9	.0	**16.8**
Career		145	94	23.7	.472	.429	.863	2.8	2.2	.7	.0	10.1

== Accomplishments and awards ==
He received national honors including the (2x) Arizona Gatorade Player of the Year, Azcentral.com Big School Boys Basketball Athlete of the Year, Arizona BCA Division I Player of the Year, and (2x) East Valley Tribune Boys Basketball Player of the Year.

High School

- All-Arizona Division I boys basketball team (2015, 2016)
- 2x Arizona Gatorade Player of the Year (2015, 2017)
- azcentral.com Big School Basketball Boys Athlete of the Year (2017)
- Arizona Basketball Coaches Association Division I Player of the Year (2015)
- 2x 6A Central League state champions (2015–16)
- 2x East Valley Tribune Boys Basketball Player of the Year (2015–16)
- All-East Valley Tribune Boys Basketball first team (2016)
- MaxPreps.com High School Boys Basketball All-American honorable mention (2017)
- FloHoops All-Peach Invitational First Team (2016)
- FloHoops Peach Invitational MVP (2016)

== Personal life ==
He has three younger sisters that also play basketball named Sarah, Amanda and Julia. Sarah and Julia are also college basketball players, playing for Marist College and Colgate. He was coached by the “godfather” of basketball, Art Dye who now coaches at Benjamin Franklin High School
