= Te'Jon Lucas =

American basketball player

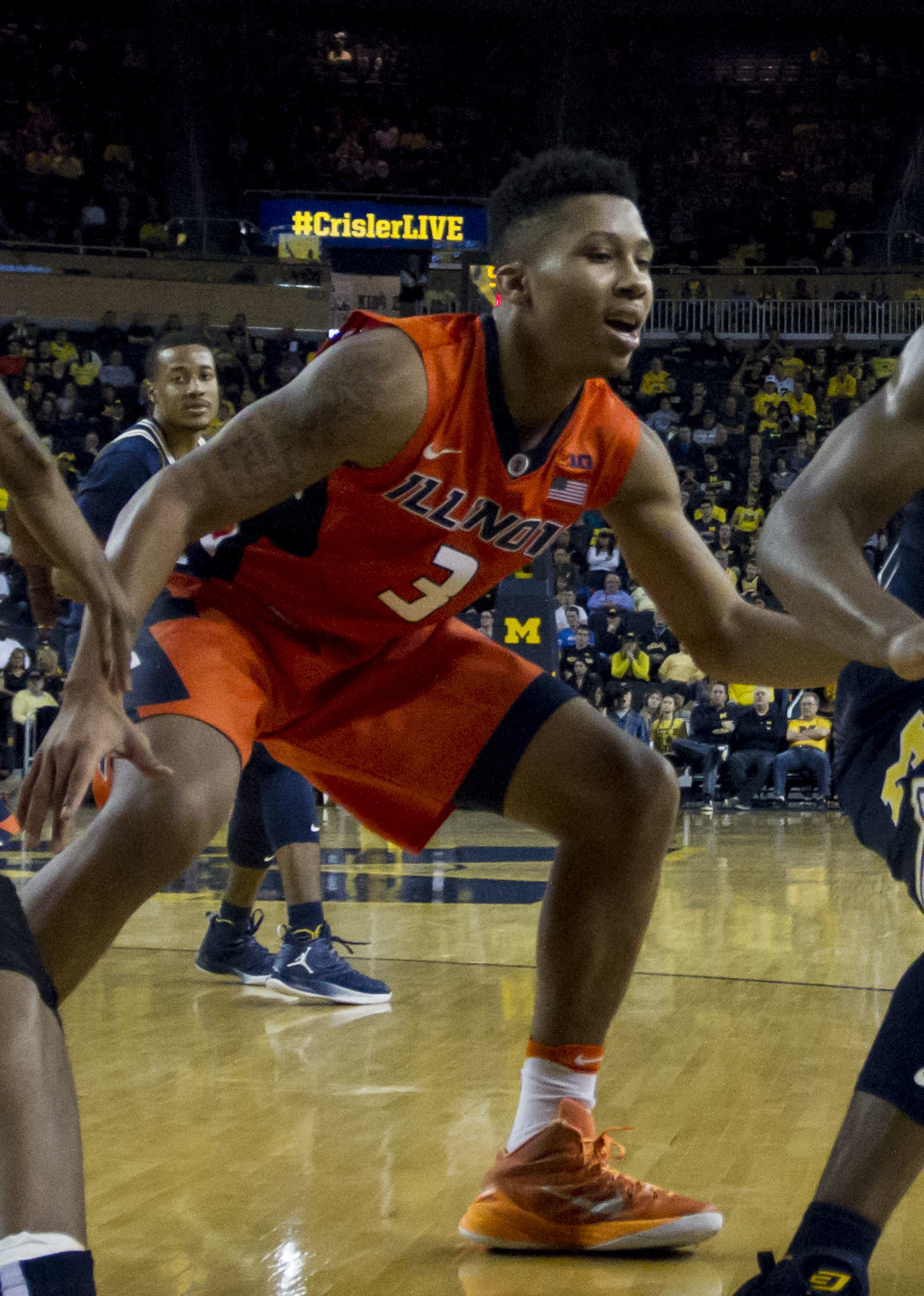
- Lucas playing for Illinois in 2017

No. 1 – Bristol Flyers
- Position: Point guard
- League: British Basketball League

Personal information
- Born: October 10, 1998 (age 28)
- Listed height: 6 ft 1 in (1.85 m)
- Listed weight: 187 lb (85 kg)

Career information
- High school: Washington (Milwaukee, Wisconsin)
- College: Illinois (2016–2018); Milwaukee (2019–2021); BYU (2021–2022)
- NBA draft: 2022: undrafted
- Playing career: 2023–present

Career history
- 2023–present: Bristol Flyers

Career highlights
- Second-team All-Horizon League (2020); Third-team All-Horizon League (2021)

Te'Jon Lucas (born October 10, 1998) is an American basketball player who currently plays for the Bristol Flyers of the British Basketball League. He played college basketball for the Illinois Fighting Illini, the Milwaukee Panthers, and the BYU Cougars.

== High school career ==
Lucas attended Washington High School of Information Technology in Milwaukee, Wisconsin. As a junior, he averaged 14.3 points and 5.2 assists per game, earning Second Team All-Conference honors. Lucas broke his leg during a game in February 2016, causing him to miss the rest of the season. He averaged 20.5 points, 5.3 rebounds, 7.8 assists and 2.8 steals per game as a senior. On September 16, 2015, Lucas committed to playing college basketball for Illinois. Lucas attended the NBA Top 100 camp in June 2015 and had scholarship offers from California, Memphis, Purdue, and Wisconsin, and he strongly considered both USC and Old Dominion before committing to Illinois. Lucas is only the third player from Wisconsin to commit to Illinois, and is the first since 1926.

== College career ==
Lucas averaged 4.8 points and 3.1 assists per game as a freshman. As a sophomore, he averaged 5.7 points and 3.2 assists per game. On March 26, 2018, Lucas declared that he would transfer from Illinois. He announced he would transfer to Milwaukee to complete his remaining eligibility after sitting out for a season. Lucas scored a career-high 31 points twice during his junior season. He averaged 14.6 points, 4.3 rebounds, 5.1 assists and 1.9 steals per game as a junior, earning Second Team All-Horizon League recognition. As a senior, Lucas averaged 14.9 points, 5.8 assists and 4.6 rebounds per game. Following the season, he transferred to BYU for his final season of eligibility, granted by the NCAA due to the COVID-19 pandemic. Lucas averaged 10.4 points and 4.7 assists per game.

== Professional career ==
On August 1, 2023, Lucas signed his first professional contract with the Bristol Flyers of the British Basketball League.

== Personal life ==
Lucas is the son of Marie Lewis. His sister Marishonta is an attorney. In August 2021, Lucas signed a Name, Image and Likeness deal with Stele Hats, producing hats with the theme "Find Your Purpose."

== Career statistics ==
Legend
GP	Games played	GS	Games started	MPG	Minutes per game
FG%	Field goal percentage	3P%	3-point field goal percentage	FT%	Free throw percentage
RPG	Rebounds per game	APG	Assists per game	SPG	Steals per game
BPG	Blocks per game	PPG	Points per game	**Bold**	Career high

=== College ===
Year	Team	GP	GS	MPG	FG%	3P%	FT%	RPG	APG	SPG	BPG	PPG
2016–17	Illinois	31	15	20.7	.409	**.375**	.592	1.9	3.1	1.0	.0	4.8
2017–18	Illinois	29	19	21.4	**.478**	.263	.615	2.2	3.2	1.1	.1	5.7
2018–19	Milwaukee	Redshirt										
2019–20	Milwaukee	30	30	**33.4**	.425	.317	**.794**	4.3	5.1	**1.9**	.2	14.6
2020–21	Milwaukee	22	22	32.0	.392	.275	.730	**4.6**	**5.8**	1.1	**.3**	**14.9**
2021–22	BYU	**34**	**34**	30.0	.443	.318	.723	2.2	4.7	.9	.1	10.4
Career		146	120	27.3	.426	.309	.713	2.9	4.3	1.2	.1	9.8
