= Cody Fueger =

American basketball coach

Current position
- Title: Assistant coach
- Team: Kentucky
- Conference: SEC

Biographical details
- Born: August 10, 1983 (age 43); Milwaukee, Wisconsin, U.S.
- Education: University of Utah

Coaching career (HC unless noted)
- 2002–2007: Utah (video coord./student assistant)
- 2007–2011: Louisiana Tech (DBO)
- 2011–2012: UC Riverside (DBO)
- 2012–2013: Utah State (DBO)
- 2013–2015: BYU (DBO)
- 2015–2019: Utah Valley (assistant)
- 2019–2024: BYU (assistant)
- 2024–present: Kentucky (assistant)

Cody William Fueger (born August 10, 1983) is an American college basketball coach who is currently an assistant coach for the University of Kentucky. Fueger previously served as an assistant at BYU starting in 2019 before following Head Coach Mark Pope to Kentucky in 2024.

== Career ==
Fueger began his career at Utah while he was still a student. He served as video coordinator and student assistant under Head Coach Rick Majerus. Utah would go on to become MWC regular season champions in 2003 and 2005, as well as winning a MWC tournament championship in 2004.

In 2007, Fueger became Director of Basketball Operations at Louisiana Tech. After four seasons, Fueger left for UC Riverside. The next season he arrived at Utah State. At the end of the season, he would move on to BYU where he would serve alongside assistant coach Mark Pope.

In 2015, Pope took the head coaching job at Utah Valley and brought Fueger on as an assistant. Pope and Fueger returned to BYU in 2019 as head coach and assistant. In 2024, Mark Pope became the head coach at the University of Kentucky. Soon after, Cody Fueger was named an assistant coach.
