= Nick Robinson (basketball) =

American basketball coach

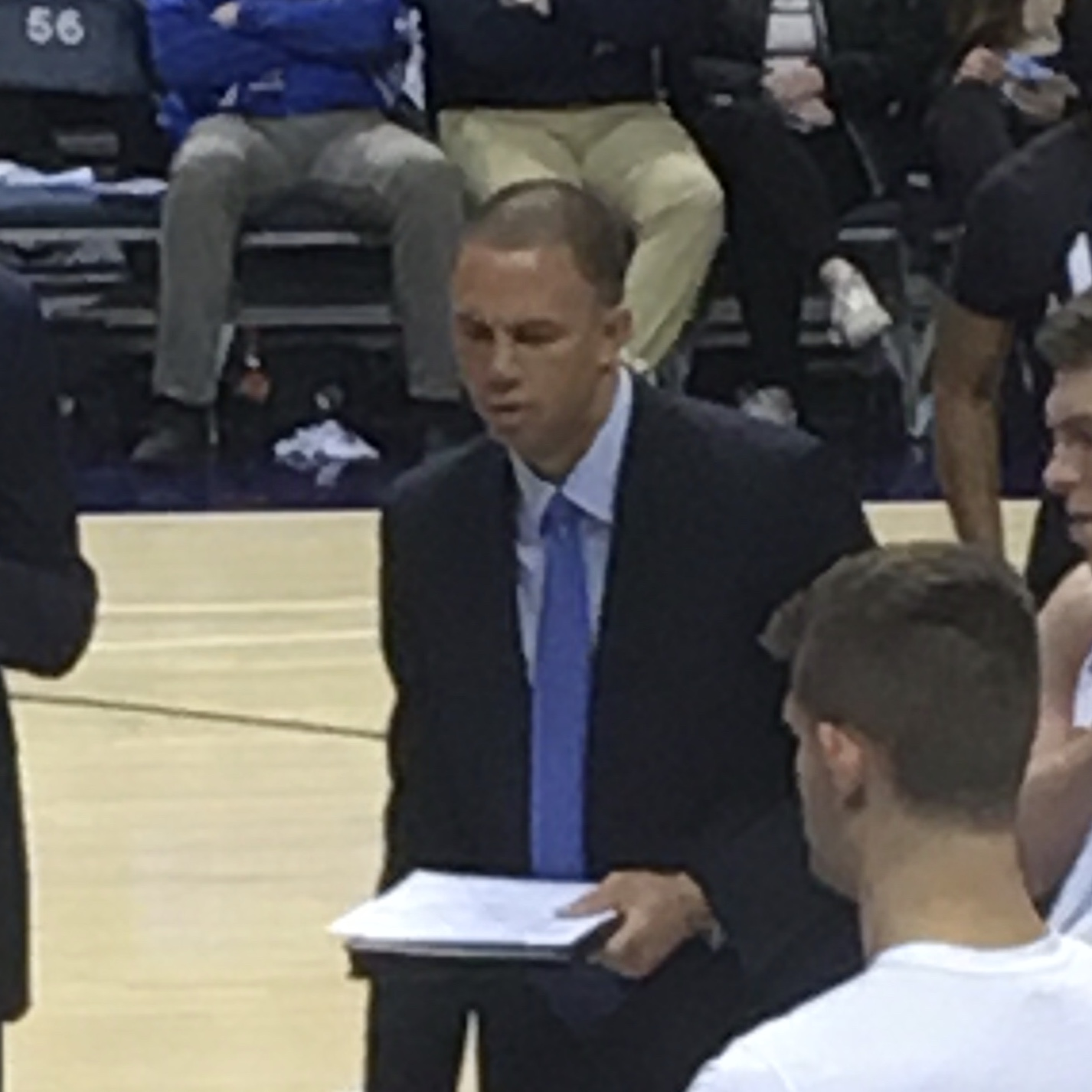

Current position
- Title: Assistant coach
- Team: Kentucky
- Conference: SEC

Biographical details
- Born: November 2, 1979 (age 46); Liberty, Missouri, U.S.

Playing career
- 2001–2005: Stanford
- Position: Forward

Coaching career (HC unless noted)
- 2005–2006: Rio Rancho HS (assistant)
- 2006–2007: Stanford (dir. of ops.)
- 2007–2008: Stanford (assistant)
- 2008–2009: William Jewell (assistant)
- 2009–2010: LSU (executive asst. to HC)
- 2010–2011: LSU (dir. of ops.)
- 2011–2012: LSU (assistant)
- 2012–2016: Southern Utah
- 2017–2019: Seattle (assistant)
- 2019–2024: BYU (assistant)
- 2024–present: Kentucky (dir. of ops.)

Head coaching record
- Overall: 29–90

Nicholas Stromberg Robinson (born November 2, 1979) is an American college basketball coach who is currently the director of basketball operations for the University of Kentucky. Robinson previously served as an assistant at BYU starting in 2019 before following Head Coach Mark Pope to Kentucky in 2024.

== Early life and education ==
Born in Salt Lake City, Utah, Robinson graduated from Liberty High School in 1998. After high school, Robinson went on a two-year LDS mission to Maceió, Brazil. In 2000, Robinson enrolled at Stanford University, where he would play on the Stanford Cardinal men's basketball team from 2001 to 2005, under coach Mike Montgomery in the first three years and Trent Johnson in his last. He was team captain in his junior and senior years, including the 2003–04 season in which Stanford went 30–2, a season which featured a game-winning shot from him against Arizona. Robinson averaged 8.2 points and 4.6 rebounds in his senior season. Robinson graduated in 2005 with a bachelor's degree in political science and master's degree in sociology.

== Coaching career ==
Robinson was a volunteer assistant coach at Rio Rancho High School in Rio Rancho, New Mexico in the 2005–06 season. The following season, Robinson returned to Stanford to become director of basketball operations, again under Trent Johnson. Stanford promoted Robinson to assistant coach the following year. In the 2008–09 season, Robinson was assistant at NAIA William Jewell College.

Reuniting with Trent Johnson at LSU in 2009, Robinson first served as Johnson's executive assistant for the 2009–10 season and director of basketball operations in 2010–11 before becoming an assistant coach again in the 2011–12 season.

From 2012 to 2016, Robinson was head coach at Southern Utah. Robinson went 29–90 in four years and was fired on March 9, 2016.

Robinson was hired to be an assistant coach at Seattle University men's basketball ahead of the 2017–2018 season. In April 2019, he was named as an assistant coach to Mark Pope at Brigham Young University.

In 2024, Robinson was hired as director of basketball operations for the University of Kentucky.

== Head coaching record ==
Statistics overview
Season	Team	Overall	Conference	Standing	Postseason
Southern Utah Thunderbirds (Big Sky Conference) (2012–2016)
2012–13	Southern Utah	11–20	8–12	6th	
2013–14	Southern Utah	2–27	1–19	11th	
2014–15	Southern Utah	10–19	7–11	9th	
2015–16	Southern Utah	6–24	3–15	T–11th	
Southern Utah:		29–90	19–57		
Total:		29–90			
