= Chris Burgess =

American former professional basketball player and current assistant

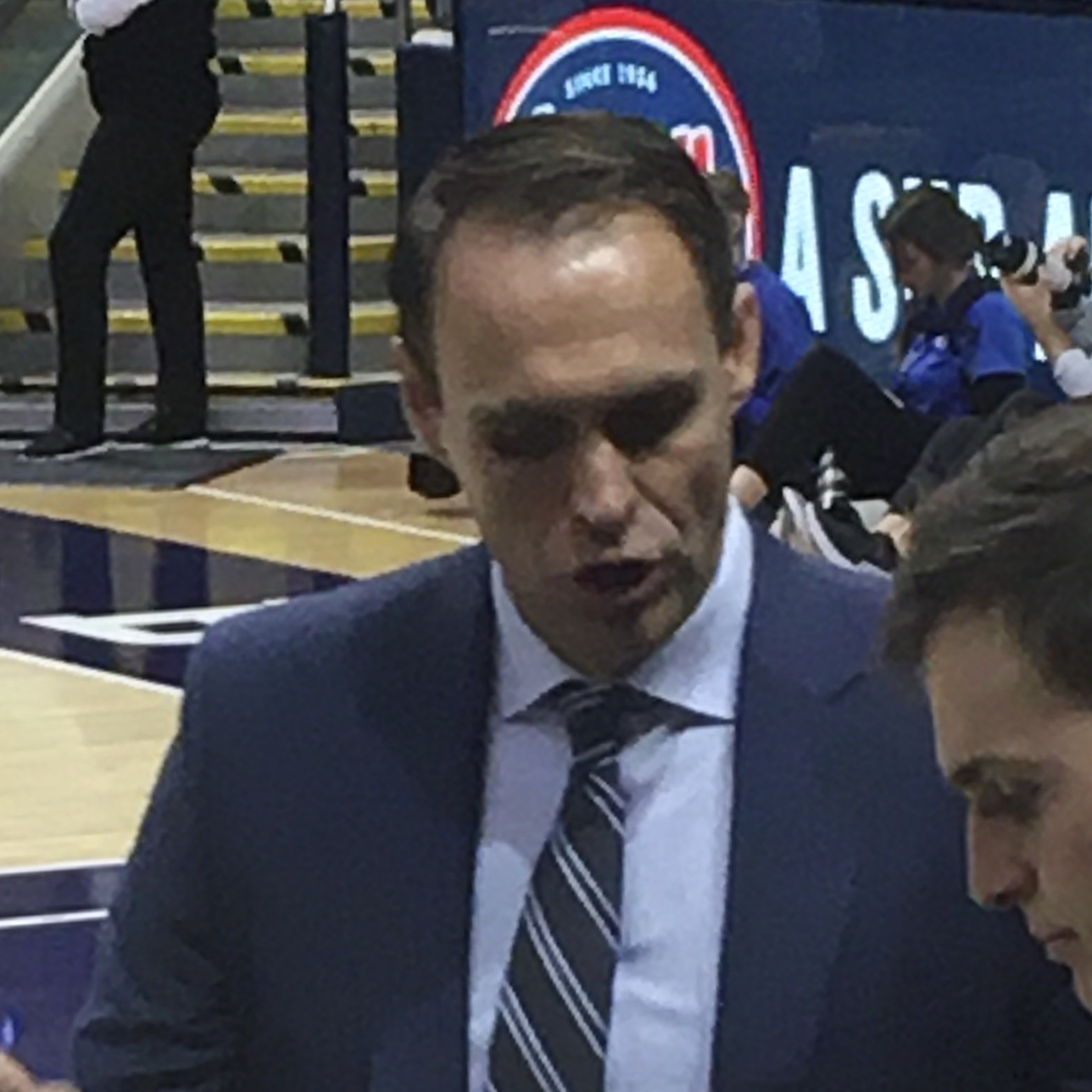

BYU Cougars
- Title: Assistant coach
- League: Big 12

Personal information
- Born: April 23, 1979 (age 47) Provo, Utah, U.S.
- Listed height: 6 ft 10 in (2.08 m)
- Listed weight: 244.2 lb (111 kg)

Career information
- High school: Mater Dei (Santa Ana, California); Woodbridge (Irvine, California)
- College: Duke (1997–1999); Utah (2000–2002)
- NBA draft: 2002: undrafted
- Playing career: 2002–2013
- Position: Power forward / center
- Coaching career: 2015–present

Career history

Playing
- 2002: Idaho Stampede
- 2003: Tuborg Sports Club
- 2004–2005: Cairns Taipans
- 2005: San Miguel Beermen
- 2005–2006: Cairns Taipans
- 2006: Criollos de Caguas
- 2006–2007: Mobis Phoebus
- 2007–2008: TTNet Beykoz
- 2008: Gigantes de Carolina
- 2008: BC Donetsk
- 2008–2009: Erdemirspor
- 2009–2010: Al Wasl
- 2010: Sharjah
- 2010–2011: Zastal Zielona Góra
- 2011–2012: Trefl Sopot
- 2012: Guaynabo Mets
- 2012–2013: Baniyas
- 2013: Al Ahli
- 2013: Al Shabab

Coaching
- 2015–2019: Utah Valley (assistant)
- 2019–2022: BYU (assistant)
- 2022–2024: Utah (assistant)
- 2024–present: BYU (assistant)

Career highlights
- As player: All-NBL First Team (2005); All-NBL Third Team (2006); First-team Parade All-American (1997); McDonald's All-American (1997)

Chris Burgess (born April 23, 1979) is an American basketball coach who is currently serving as an assistant coach of the Brigham Young University (BYU) men's basketball team. Burgess has held assistant coaching roles at three universities in Utah, including three years at BYU (from 2019 to 2022) prior to rejoining the staff in 2024. As a player, Burgess played power forward and center and spent a decade playing professionally in the U.S. and internationally.

== College career ==
Burgess was recruited by several high-profile programs out of high school, as the No. 1 recruit in the country and a McDonald's All-American. He narrowed his choices to Duke and BYU. He ultimately signed with the Blue Devils, later explaining that the opportunity to play for coach Mike Krzyzewski was a major deciding factor. Burgess played at Duke for two years, reaching the Elite Eight in 1998 and playing in the championship game in 1999. During both seasons, Burgess played a supporting role off the bench, averaging (freshman) 4.3 points, 3.4 rebounds, shooting 50.8% from the field, and playing 12.5 minutes a game; and averaging (sophomore) 5.4 points, 3.9 rebounds, shooting 61.4% from the field, and playing 15.6 minutes a game.

Burgess subsequently transferred to the Utah, but he suffered three different injuries. He averaged 7.8 points, 5.9 rebounds, 1.2 blocks, and shot 53.5% from the field while averaging 21.6 minutes a game his junior year. He averaged a team high in 5 statistical categories with 13.2 points, 7.2 rebounds, 1.2 blocks, and shot 66% from the field while averaging 25.5 minutes a game his senior year.

== Professional playing career ==
Burgess was not drafted into the National Basketball Association (NBA). He played for the Idaho Stampede of the Continental Basketball Association, after which he spent a decade between various professional teams based in Australia, Korea, Philippines, Poland, Puerto Rico, Turkey, and Ukraine. He also participated in training camps or summer leagues for several NBA teams including the Phoenix Suns, the Boston Celtics, and the Washington Wizards.

== Coaching career ==
Burgess coached at Utah Valley for four years before following coach Mark Pope to BYU. Burgess coached at BYU for three years and then took the job at Utah. In 2024, Burgess returned to BYU as the lead assistant coach under new coach Kevin Young.

== Personal life ==
Burgess is married to Lesa Zollinger of Millville, Utah; they have three daughters and two sons. He is a member of the Church of Jesus Christ of Latter-day Saints.
