= American Heritage School (Utah) =

Location
- 736 North 1100 East; American Fork, Utah 84003; United States

Information
- Funding type: Private
- Established: 1970
- Grades: K–12
- Enrollment: 1300 students
- Colors: Red; White; Blue
- Athletics: UHSAA
- Mascot: Patriot
- Team name: Patriots
- Website: af.americanheritageschool.org

American Heritage School is a private school serving grades K–12 located in American Fork, Utah, United States. It is an accredited member of the Northwest Association of Independent Schools (NWAIS) and Cognia.

== Description ==
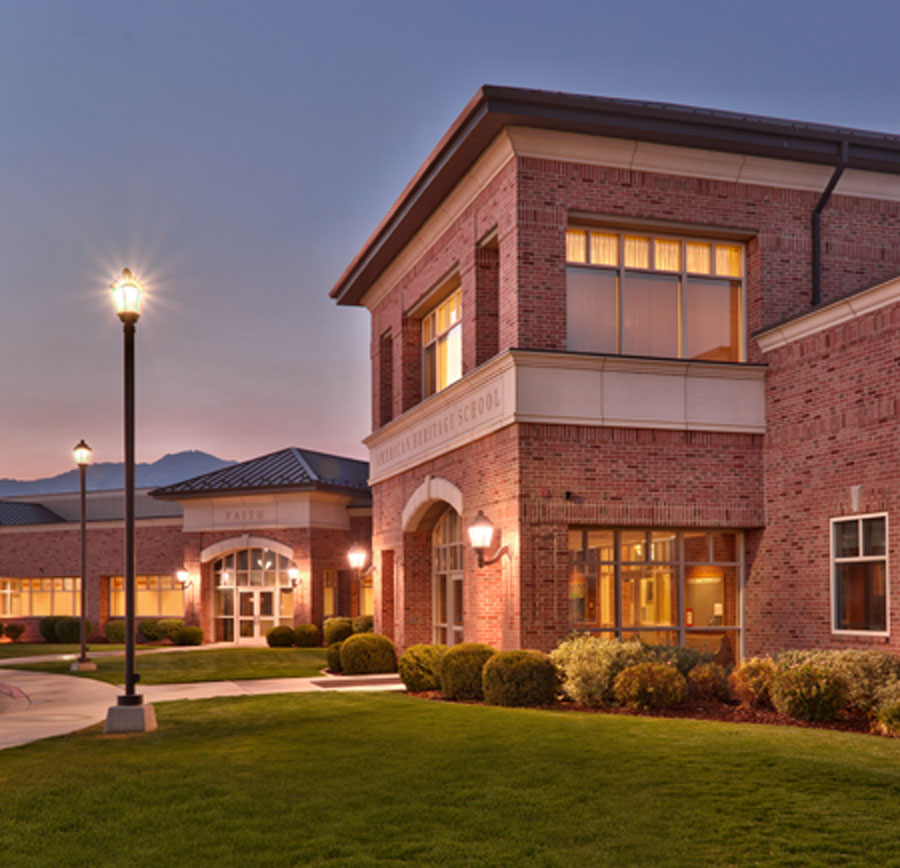
American Heritage School, July 2012

AHS serves 1,300 students in grades K–12 on campus with approximately 5,000 students participating in distance education and homeschool courses offered by American Heritage Worldwide, the school's distance education program. AHS also offers an online diploma-granting option, AHS Online High School. In 2022, American Heritage opened a new campus in downtown Salt Lake City that serves more than 200 students in grades K–12. AHS is funded through tuition and private donations and accepts no public funding.

American Heritage School offers a full array of academic, fine arts, and athletics opportunities for its students. Activities include ballroom, choir, drama, orchestra, experiential learning, student government, basketball, baseball, cross country, dance, golf, soccer, tennis, track and field, and volleyball.

== History ==
After Brigham Young High School closed its doors in 1968, several parents with children at that school and other area schools banded together to create American Heritage School, which opened its doors in 1970 with an enrollment of 85 students. Though the school is oriented toward The Church of Jesus Christ of Latter-day Saints, it is not legally affiliated with Brigham Young University or The Church of Jesus Christ of Latter-day Saints.

In 2002, the school moved from its Pleasant Grove, Utah location to a new 11-acre (4.5 ha), $20 million K–8 campus across from the Mount Timpanogos Utah Temple in American Fork. The entire campus was funded through private donations. In 2009, the school completed a $5 million building expansion to provide for capacity to offer high school grades as well as to accommodate growth in elementary and middle school grades. American Heritage School then launched their accredited, worldwide Home and Distance Education program called Latter-day Learning in the fall of 2010 (now known as American Heritage Worldwide), which serves families in all 50 states and approximately 70 countries around the world.

In the fall of 2018, American Heritage completed another campus expansion that added a basketball arena, classrooms, football/soccer stadium, track, baseball field, and tennis courts encompassed within an additional 29 acres (12 ha), bringing the campus to 40 acres (16 ha). As is the school's practice, the 2018 expansion was completely funded with donations from private donors, with no funds coming from tuition or public sources.

After a two-year review process, American Heritage announced a second campus location would be opened in downtown Salt Lake City in the fall of 2022.

AHS added a third indoor recreation space (the Patriot Auxiliary Court/PAC) and completed an additional high school phase in the fall of 2021. Again, all funds used in the expansion were provided by private donors.

== School traditions ==
One of the central traditions of American Heritage School is music. The school has an official song, “Children of Liberty,” written by one of its original teachers. The song is sung at assemblies, parent meetings, and student devotional performances. The song also forms the goals and philosophy of American Heritage School. It reminds students to “learn from the past,” seek “truth, honor, and charity,” and “let your ray glow.

In addition to its 1,300 on-campus students, American Heritage also enrolls approximately 600 students in award-winning after-school orchestra (Lyceum Philharmonic) that has been featured on PBS, and choir programs (Heritage Youth Choirs) that are open to the community.

Another long-standing school tradition includes the Christmas Teddy Bear Hug, where students donate hundreds of teddy bears each Christmas and then all line up to hug each bear before sending the bears to children in need.

The patriotic program, "The Spirit of America Speaks," has been performed each year since the very early days of the school and highlights "God's divine hand in guiding His children throughout the centuries".

The school also focuses on Shakespeare with plays, costumes, food, and readings of Shakespeare's great works.

The school has developed a week-long celebration of the U.S. Constitution with character re-enactments, a large festival and extensive fireworks show, and study of that most pivotal document during "Constitution Month" in September.

== Other schools using the American Heritage School name ==
American Heritage School has granted permission for the use of the name "American Heritage" by other "sister" schools, including "American Heritage Academy of Las Vegas.” While these separate entities are not legally affiliated with American Heritage Schools, Inc., and are not administered or directed by American Heritage School, they have modeled their schools' mission statements and curricula after that of American Heritage School.
