= Mark Pope =

American basketball player and coach (born 1972)

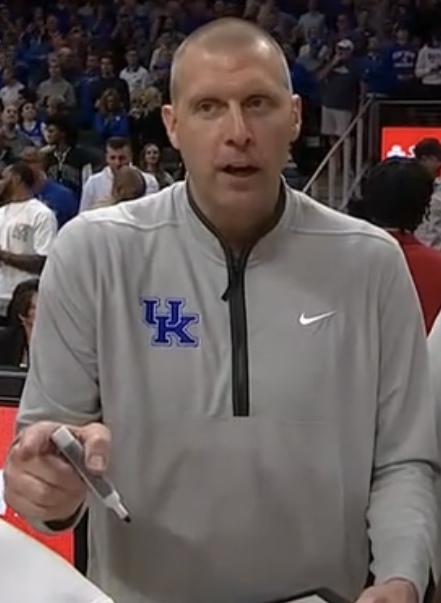
- Pope with Kentucky in 2024

Kentucky Wildcats
- Title: Head coach
- League: Southeastern Conference

Personal information
- Born: September 11, 1972 (age 54) Omaha, Nebraska, U.S.
- Listed height: 6 ft 10 in (2.08 m)
- Listed weight: 235 lb (107 kg)

Career information
- High school: Newport (Bellevue, Washington)
- College: Washington (1991–1993); Kentucky (1994–1996)
- NBA draft: 1996: 2nd round, 52nd overall pick
- Drafted by: Indiana Pacers
- Playing career: 1997–2005
- Position: Power forward / small forward
- Number: 43, 41
- Coaching career: 2009–present

Career history

Playing
- 1996–1997: Anadolu Efes S.K.
- 1997–1999: Indiana Pacers
- 1999: La Crosse Bobcats
- 1999–2000: Ülkerspor
- 2000–2002: Milwaukee Bucks
- 2003–2005: Denver Nuggets

Coaching
- 2009–2010: Georgia (assistant)
- 2010–2011: Wake Forest (assistant)
- 2011–2015: BYU (assistant)
- 2015–2019: Utah Valley
- 2019–2024: BYU
- 2024–2026: Kentucky

Career highlights
- NCAA national champion (1996); Pac-10 Freshman of the Year (1992)

Career statistics
- Points: 285 (1.9 ppg)
- Assists: 63 (0.4 apg)
- Rebound: 261 (1.7 rpg)
- Stats at NBA.com
- Stats at Basketball Reference

Mark Edward Pope (born September 11, 1972) is an American collegiate basketball coach and former player who is head men's basketball coach at the University of Kentucky, his alma mater.

As a player, Pope played power forward and small forward. He was Pac-10 Freshman of the Year with the Washington Huskies and then transferred to Kentucky, where he served as a team captain of its 1996 NCAA national championship team. After college, Pope spent almost a decade playing professionally in the U.S. and internationally.

Pope has held various coaching roles at the collegiate level. Prior to taking the helm at his alma mater, he was the head coach at Utah Valley from 2015 to 2019 and BYU from 2019 to 2024.

== Playing career ==
Pope played at Newport High School in Bellevue, Washington, a suburb east of Seattle. In college, he played two years nearby at the University of Washington under head coach Lynn Nance and earned Pac-10 Freshman of the Year honors in 1992 after setting a freshman single-season school record with 8.1 rebounds per game. After his second season with the Huskies in 1993, Nance resigned and Pope transferred to the University of Kentucky, then led by head coach Rick Pitino. After sitting out the 1994 season due to NCAA transfer rules, Pope appeared in every game for the Wildcats over the next two seasons, winning two SEC championships. As a senior, he was a team captain on the 1996 team that won the NCAA national championship, averaging 7.6 points in 20.3 minutes per game.

Following his college career, Pope was a second-round pick for the Indiana Pacers in the 1996 NBA draft. He played six seasons in the NBA for the Pacers, Milwaukee Bucks, and Denver Nuggets; his playing career ended in 2005.

== Coaching career ==
=== Early coaching jobs ===
In 2006, Pope enrolled in medical school at Columbia University College of Physicians and Surgeons in New York City. In 2009, he left medical school and joined Mark Fox's coaching staff at the University of Georgia as director of basketball operations for the 2009–10 season. Fox was an assistant coach when both were at Washington. The following season (2010–11), Pope moved to Wake Forest to serve as an assistant under Jeff Bzdelik.

From 2011 to 2015, Pope was an assistant under Dave Rose at BYU. In four years, Pope helped the Cougars to four straight 20-win seasons and four straight postseason appearances, including three NCAA Tournament bids and a trip to the semifinals of the 2013 NIT.

=== Utah Valley (2015–2019) ===
In 2015, Pope was hired as the head coach at Utah Valley University (UVU). In four years at UVU (2015–19), Pope's teams made improvements each season, going from 12 wins in 2015–16 to 25 in 2018–19. He also led the Wolverines to three-straight postseason appearances (2017, 2018, 2019) and back-to-back 20-win seasons (2017–18, 2018–19).

=== BYU (2019–2024) ===
On April 10, 2019, Pope was hired to replace Dave Rose as BYU's 19th men's basketball head coach, after Rose's retirement. In his first season, Pope led the Cougars to a 24–8 record, the most wins for a first-year coach in program history. He became just the second first-year BYU coach to lead his team into the top 25 and the first to end his debut season ranked. The Cougars entered the top 25 as No. 23 in the AP Poll on Feb. 17 and jumped to as high as No. 14. In league play, Pope guided the Cougars to a record of 13–3, second in the West Coast Conference (WCC). The 13 wins – which included a 91–78 victory over No. 2 Gonzaga in the Marriott Center – were tied for the most by BYU during their time in the WCC. Gonzaga was the highest-ranked team BYU has defeated in the history of the Marriott Center. The Cougars finished the regular season on a nine-game win streak, the team's longest win streak in WCC play. BYU boasted one of the most efficient offenses in the nation in 2019–20, evidenced by top 5 national rankings in several statistical categories. The team was projected to be a lock for an at-large bid for the NCAA Tournament, which would have been their first berth since 2015. However, the COVID-19 pandemic cancelled the tournament and prematurely ended the successful season. BYU ended the season at No. 18 in the AP Poll and No. 16 in the USA Today Coaches Poll.

Pope's early success with the Cougars continued in 2020–21. BYU finished 10–3 in WCC play. The team reached the finals of the WCC Tournament, losing to Gonzaga, 88–78, in the championship. The team received an at-large bid for the NCAA Tournament for the first time since 2015. They were defeated in the first round by UCLA, 73–62. On January 20, 2022, BYU defeated San Diego 79–71, which marked Pope's 60th career win at BYU and made him the fastest BYU head coach ever to reach that benchmark. The win also gave the Cougars a 16–4 record for the season, which was Pope's best start through 20 games as head coach. Pope and the Cougars went 24–11 in 2021–22 and ended their season in the quarterfinals of the NIT. During 2022–23, BYU failed to reach 20 wins for the first time in Pope's tenure as head coach, going 19–15 overall and 7–9 in-conference for the Cougars' final season as a member of the WCC. The Cougars failed to reach the postseason for the first time since 2019.

On July 1, 2023, BYU became a member of the Big 12 Conference, with Pope coaching the Cougars in their first-ever season as part of a major conference in 2023–24. BYU posted a 22–9 regular season record and a 10–8 record in Big 12 play during the 2023–24 season. The Cougars advanced to the quarterfinals of the Big 12 tournament, where they were defeated by Texas Tech. They received a bid to the NCAA Tournament as a 6-seed and lost to Duquesne in the Round of 64.

=== Kentucky (2024–present) ===
On April 12, 2024, Pope was hired to become the 23rd men's basketball head coach at Kentucky, replacing John Calipari.

Pope's coaching debut at Kentucky was a 103–62 win against Wright State University. The score received some media attention for being a 41-point win, as #41 was the number of Pope when he was a player at Kentucky.

In Pope's third game as coach, ranked #19, he faced Kentucky's long-time rival #6 Duke University in the Champions Classic in Atlanta, Georgia. He won 77–72 in his first win against a ranked team as head coach of UK, giving the Wildcats their first win over Duke since 2015.

== Personal life ==
Pope and his wife, Lee Anne, a former assistant to talk show host David Letterman, have four daughters. Lee Anne is the daughter of the late Lynn Archibald, the head basketball coach at Idaho State University (1977–1982), the University of Utah (1983–1989); and was an assistant at BYU in the 1990s. Pope is a member of the Church of Jesus Christ of Latter-day Saints.

== Career statistics ==
Legend
GP	Games played	GS	Games started	MPG	Minutes per game
FG%	Field goal percentage	3P%	3-point field goal percentage	FT%	Free throw percentage
RPG	Rebounds per game	APG	Assists per game	SPG	Steals per game
BPG	Blocks per game	PPG	Points per game	**Bold**	Career high

=== NBA ===
==== Regular season ====
Year	Team	GP	GS	MPG	FG%	3P%	FT%	RPG	APG	SPG	BPG	PPG
1997–98	Indiana	28	0	6.9	.341	**.333**	.588	.9	.3	.1	.2	1.4
1998–99	Indiana	4	0	6.5	.143	.000	.000	1.0	.0	.0	.0	.5
2000–01	Milwaukee	**63**	**45**	**15.0**	.437	.208	**.629**	**2.3**	**.6**	**.3**	**.4**	**2.4**
2001–02	Milwaukee	45	12	9.5	.396	.160	.524	1.6	.4	.2	.2	1.9
2003–04	Denver	4	0	5.0	**.500**	–	.000	.8	.0	.1	.0	.5
2004–05	Denver	9	0	3.0	.333	–	–	.9	.1	.1	.2	.4
Career		153	57	10.7	.401	.179	.573	1.7	.4	.2	.3	1.9

==== Playoffs ====
Year	Team	GP	GS	MPG	FG%	3P%	FT%	RPG	APG	SPG	BPG	PPG
1998	Indiana	**7**	0	6.0	**.667**	.000	**1.000**	.7	.1	.1	.0	1.3
2001	Milwaukee	6	**3**	**7.7**	.500	.000	–	**2.0**	**.3**	**.3**	.0	**1.7**
Career		13	3	6.8	.563	.000	1.000	1.3	.2	.2	.0	1.5

== Head coaching record ==
Record table
Season	Team	Overall	Conference	Standing	Postseason
Utah Valley Wolverines (Western Athletic Conference) (2015–2019)
2015–16	Utah Valley	12–18	6–8	5th	
2016–17	Utah Valley	17–17	6–8	5th	CBI Semifinal
2017–18	Utah Valley	23–11	10–4	2nd	CBI Quarterfinal
2018–19	Utah Valley	25–10	12–4	2nd	CBI Quarterfinal
Utah Valley:		77–56 (.579)	34–24 (.586)		
BYU Cougars (West Coast Conference) (2019–2023)
2019–20	BYU	24–8	13–3	2nd	No Postseason (COVID-19)
2020–21	BYU	20–7	10–3	2nd	NCAA Division I Round of 64
2021–22	BYU	24–11	9–6	5th	NIT Quarterfinal
2022–23	BYU	19–15	7–9	T–5th	
BYU Cougars (Big 12 Conference) (2023–2024)
2023–24	BYU	23–11	10–8	T–5th	NCAA Division I Round of 64
BYU:		110–52 (.679)	49–29 (.628)		
Kentucky Wildcats (Southeastern Conference) (2024–present)
2024–25	Kentucky	24–12	10–8	T–6th	NCAA Division I Sweet 16
2025–26	Kentucky	22–14	10–8	T–7th	NCAA Division I Round of 32
2026–27	Kentucky	4–2	0–0		
Kentucky:		50–28 (.641)	20–16 (.556)		
Total:		237–136 (.635)			
