= 2021–22 ASUN Conference men's basketball season =

- League: NCAA Division I
- Sport: Basketball
- Number of teams: 12

Regular season
- Champions: Jacksonville State Gamecocks

Tournament
- Champions: Bellarmine Knights
- Runners-up: Jacksonville Dolphins

Seasons
- ← 2020-21 2022-23 →

2021–22 ASUN men's basketball standings
	Conf.				Overall
Team	W		L	PCT	W		L	PCT
East
Liberty	12	–	4	.750	22	–	11	.667
Jacksonville	11	–	5	.688	21	–	10	.677
Florida Gulf Coast	10	–	6	.625	22	–	12	.647
Kennesaw State	7	–	9	.438	13	–	18	.419
North Florida	7	–	9	.438	11	–	20	.355
Stetson	5	–	11	.313	11	–	19	.367
West
Jacksonville State^	13	–	3	.813	21	–	11	.656
Bellarmine* †	11	–	5	.688	20	–	13	.606
Central Arkansas	7	–	9	.438	11	–	20	.355
Lipscomb	6	–	10	.375	14	–	19	.424
Eastern Kentucky	5	–	11	.313	13	–	18	.419
North Alabama*	2	–	14	.125	9	–	21	.300
*Ineligible for the 2022 NCAA tournament due to transition from Division II^Due to Bellarmine's ineligibility, the regular-season champions Jacksonville State took their NCAA tournament berth instead.
† 2022 ASUN tournament winner

The 2021–22 ASUN Conference men's basketball season started non-conference play on November 9, 2021, and began conference play on January 4, 2022. The regular season ended on February 26, 2022, followed by the 2022 ASUN men's basketball tournament held March 1–8, 2022.

The conference's regular season champions, the Jacksonville State Gamecocks, were awarded the conference's automatic bid to the 2022 NCAA Division I men's basketball tournament. The conference tournament was won by the Bellarmine Knights, who were ineligible for the NCAA tournament due to their transitional status moving from NCAA Division II to NCAA Division I.

== Conference changes ==
Due to the offseason additions of Central Arkansas, Eastern Kentucky, and Jacksonville State, the ASUN changed the conference play format. The conference was split into East and West Divisions. The East includes Florida Gulf Coast, Jacksonville, Kennesaw State, Liberty, North Florida and Stetson, while the West features Bellarmine, Central Arkansas, Eastern Kentucky, Jacksonville State, Lipscomb and North Alabama. Conference play consists of 96 total games, with each team playing 16 games. Each team plays home-and-home against the other teams in its own division, and single games against teams from the other division evenly split between home and away games.

== Head coaches ==
=== Coaching changes ===
Jacksonville hired Jordan Mincy after Tony Jasick was fired after going 11–13.

=== Coaches ===
Team	Head coach	Previous Job	Years at School	Record at School	ASUN Record	ASUN Titles	NCAA Tournaments
Bellarmine	Scott Davenport	Louisville (Assistant)	17	375-120	10-3	0	0
Central Arkansas	Anthony Boone	Central Arkansas (Assistant)	3	14-33	0-0	0	0
Eastern Kentucky	A. W. Hamilton	NC State (Assistant)	4	51-42	0-0	0	0
Florida Gulf Coast	Michael Fly	Florida Gulf Coast (Assistant)	4	34-48	20-21	0	0
Jacksonville	Jordan Mincy	Florida (Assistant)	1	0-0	0-0	0	0
Jacksonville State	Ray Harper	Western Kentucky	6	97-64	0-0	0	1
Kennesaw State	Amir Abdur-Rahim	Georgia (Assistant)	3	6-47	2-29	0	0
Liberty	Ritchie McKay	Virginia (Associate HC)	9	177-93	38-7	3	2
Lipscomb	Lennie Acuff	Alabama–Huntsville	3	31-28	18-13	0	0
North Alabama	Tony Pujol	Wyoming (Assistant)	4	34-49	22-25	0	0
North Florida	Matthew Driscoll	Baylor (Assistant)	13	192-194	111-84	1	1
Stetson	Donnie Jones	Dayton (Assistant)	3	28-32	16-16	0	0

Notes:

- Year at school includes 2021–22 season.
- Overall and ASUN records are from the time at current school and are through the end of the 2020–21 season.
- NCAA Tournament appearances are from the time at current school only, and refer solely to Division I. Before Ballarmine started its transition to Division I, Scott Davenport had led the Knights to 12 Division II tournament appearances.

== Preseason Awards ==
The ASUN preseason men's basketball poll was released on October 20, 2021.

=== Preseason men's basketball polls ===
==== Coaches Poll ====
First Place Votes in Parentheses

1. Liberty (9) - 141
2. Eastern Kentucky (1) - 126
3. Jacksonville State - 103
4. Bellarmine (1) - 97
5. Lipscomb - 89
6. Florida Gulf Coast - 88
7. North Florida (1) - 82
8. Stetson - 67
9. North Alabama - 49
10. Jacksonville - 40
11. Kennesaw State - 37
12. Central Arkansas - 17

==== Media Poll ====
First Place Votes in Parentheses

1. Liberty (30) - 276
2. Eastern Kentucky (2) - 288
3. Bellarmine / Lipscomb - 284
4. Jacksonville State - 240
5. North Florida - 230
6. Florida Gulf Coast - 200
7. Stetson - 176
8. North Alabama - 174
9. Jacksonville - 94
10. Central Arkansas - 80
11. Kennesaw State - 0

=== Preseason Honors ===
Honor	Recipient
Preseason Player of the Year	Darius McGhee, Liberty*
Preseason Defensive Player of the Year	Kevin Samuel, Florida Gulf Coast
Preseason All-ASUN First Team	Darius McGhee, Liberty*
Preseason All-ASUN First Team	Ahsan Asadullah, Lipscomb*
Preseason All-ASUN First Team	Dylan Penn, Bellarmine
Preseason All-ASUN First Team	Braxton Beverly, Eastern Kentucky
Preseason All-ASUN First Team	Jomaru Brown, Eastern Kentucky
Preseason All-ASUN First Team	Kevin Samuel, Florida Gulf Coast
Preseason All-ASUN First Team	Kevion Nolan, Jacksonville
Preseason All-ASUN First Team	Darian Adams, Jacksonville State
Preseason All-ASUN First Team	Carter Hendricksen, North Florida
Preseason All-ASUN First Team	Rob Perry, Stetson

*unanimous selection

== Regular season ==
=== Conference standings ===
North Division		Conference		Division		Overall		
Rank	Team	Record	Percent	Record	Percent	Record	Percent	Tiebreaker
1	Liberty	5-0	1.000	4-0	1.000	13-6	.684	
2	Kennesaw State	3-1	.750	3-0	1.000	8-9	.471	
3	Jacksonville	3-2	.600	3-1	.750	11-6	.647	
4	Florida Gulf Coast	2-4	.333	2-3	.400	12-8	.600	Ahead of Stetson based on Head-to-Head Win %
5	Stetson	2-4	.333	1-4	.200	8-11	.421	
6	North Florida	0-6	.000	0-5	.000	4-16	.200	

South Division		Conference		Division		Overall		
Rank	Team	Record	Percent	Record	Percent	Record	Percent	Tiebreaker
1	Jacksonville State	5-0	1.000	4-0	1.000	12-6	.667	
1	Bellarmine	5-0	1.000	4-0	1.000	11-8	.579	
3	Central Arkansas	3-2	.600	3-2	.600	6-12	.333	
4	Eastern Kentucky	2-4	.333	1-4	.200	10-10	.500	Ahead of Lipscomb based on Head-to-Head Win %
5	Lipscomb	2-4	.333	1-4	.200	9-12	.429	
6	North Alabama	1-5	.167	1-4	.200	8-11	.421	

Combined Divisions		Conference		Overall		
Rank	Team	Record	Percent	Record	Percent	Tiebreaker
1	Liberty	5-0	1.000	13-6	.684	
1	Jacksonville State	5-0	1.000	12-6	.667	
1	Bellarmine	5-0	1.000	11-8	.579	
4	Kennesaw State	3-1	.750	8-9	.471	
5	Jacksonville	3-2	.600	11-6	.647	
5	Central Arkansas	3-2	.600	6-12	.333	
7	Florida Gulf Coast	2-4	.333	12-8	.600	Ahead of Lipscomb and Stetson based on Win % between 2-4 teams
7	Eastern Kentucky	2-4	.333	10-10	.500	Ahead of Lipscomb and Stetson based on Win % between 2-4 teams
9	Lipscomb	2-4	.333	9-12	.429	
9	Stetson	2-4	.333	8-11	.421	
11	North Alabama	1-5	.167	8-11	.421	
12	North Florida	0-6	.000	4-16	.200	

=== Conference Matrix ===
	Bellarmine	Central Arkansas	Eastern Kentucky	Florida Gulf Coast	Jacksonville	Jacksonville State	Kennesaw State	Liberty	Lipscomb	North Alabama	North Florida	Stetson
vs. Bellarmine	–	0-1	0-1		0-1				0-1	0-1		
vs. Central Arkansas	1-0	–	0-1			1-0			0-1	0-1		
vs. Eastern Kentucky	1-0	1-0	–			1-0			0-1	1-0	0-1	
vs. Florida Gulf Coast				–	1-0	1-0	1-0	1-0			0-1	0-1
vs. Jacksonville	1-0			0-1	–			1-0			0-1	0-1
vs. Jacksonville State		0-1	0-1	0-1		–			0-1	0-1		
vs. Kennesaw State				0-1			–		1-0		0-1	0-1
vs. Liberty				0-1	0-1			–			0-1	0-1
vs. Lipscomb	1-0	1-0	1-0			1-0	0-1		–	0-1		
vs. North Alabama	1-0	1-0	0-1			1-0			1-0	–		1-0
vs. North Florida			1-0	1-0	1-0		1-0	1-0			–	1-0
vs. Stetson				1-0	1-0		1-0	1-0		0-1	0-1	−

=== Players of the Week ===
Week	Player(s) of the Week	School	Newcomer of the Week	School
Nov. 15	Ahsan Asadullah	Lipscomb	Jacob Ognacevic	Lipscomb
Nov. 22	Ahsan Asadullah (2)	Lipscomb (2)	Darious Hall	Central Arkansas
Nov. 29	Tavian Dunn-Martin	Florida Gulf Coast	Jannson Williams	Eastern Kentucky
Dec. 6	Cyrus Largie	Florida Gulf Coast (2)	Kevin Samuel	Florida Gulf Coast
Dec. 13	Tavian Dunn-Martin (2)	Florida Gulf Coast (3)	Jarius Hicklen	North Florida
Dec. 20	Christiaan Jones	Stetson	Jacob Ognacevic (2)	Lipscomb (2)
Dec. 27	Darius McGhee	Liberty	Ibbe Klintman	Central Arkansas (2)
Jan. 3	Devontae Blanton	Eastern Kentucky	Cameron Hunter	Central Arkansas (3)
Jan. 10	Ahsan Asadullah (3)	Lipscomb (3)	Cameron Hunter (2)	Central Arkansas (4)
Jan. 18	Darius McGhee (2)	Liberty (2)	Osayi Osifo	Jacksonville
Jan. 24	Dylan Penn	Bellarmine	Tavian Dunn-Martin	Florida Gulf Coast (2)
Jan. 31	Kayne Henry	Jacksonville State	Mike Marsh	Jacksonville (2)
Feb. 7	Tavian Dunn-Martin (3)	Florida Gulf Coast (4)	Kevin Samuel (2)	Florida Gulf Coast (3)
Feb. 14	Tavian Dunn-Martin (4)	Florida Gulf Coast (5)	Camren Hunter	Central Arkansas (5)
Feb. 21	Jarius Hicklen	North Florida	Tavian Dunn-Martin (2)	Florida Gulf Coast (4)
Feb. 28	Darius McGhee (3)	Liberty (3)	Tavian Dunn-Martin (3)	Florida Gulf Coast (5)

=== Records against other conferences ===
Power 7 Conferences	Record	Power 7 Conferences	Record
ACC	0-7	American	1-3
Big East	0-2	Big Ten	0-2
Big 12	0-6	Pac-12	0-6
SEC	1-11	Power 7 Total	2-37
Other Division I Conferences	Record	Other Division I Conferences	Record
America East	1-0	Atlantic 10	2-2
Big Sky	None	Big South	3-3
Big West	None	Colonial	4-2
Conference USA	2-7	Horizon League	4-0
Ivy League	1-0	MAAC	0-5
MAC	3-2	MEAC	3-0
MVC	1-3	MWC	None
NEC	None	OVC	2-5
Patriot League	1-0	SoCon	1-5
Southland	1-1	SWAC	7-0
Summit League	1-1	Sun Belt	1-3
WAC	1-2	WCC	0-5
Other Division I Total			39-46
NCAA Division I Total			41-83
NCAA Division II Total			1-0
NCAA Division III Total			9-0
NAIA Total			16-0
NCCAA Total			12-0
USCAA Total			1-0
Total Non-Conference Record			80-83

== Conference tournament ==
The 2022 ASUN Tournament was held at the higher seeded team's home court from March 1, 2022 to March 8, 2022.

First Round; Tuesday, March 1st, 2022 ESPN+
3W	Central Arkansas	74
6E	Stetson	73
4E	Kennesaw State	82
5W	Eastern Kentucky	73
3E	Florida Gulf Coast	81
6W	North Alabama	72
4W	Lipscomb	74
5E	North Florida	65

Quarterfinals; Thursday, March 3rd, 2022 ESPN+
2E	Jacksonville	79
3W	Central Arkansas	69
1W	Jacksonville State	78
4E	Kennesaw State	67
2W	Bellarmine	81
3E	Florida Gulf Coast	68
1E	Liberty	52
4W	Lipscomb	47

Semifinals; Saturday, March 5th, 2022 ESPN+
2E	Jacksonville	54
1W	Jacksonville State	51
2W	Bellarmine	53
1E	Liberty	50

Championship game Tuesday, March 8th, 2022 ESPN
2E	Jacksonville	72
2W	Bellarmine	77
