= 2021–22 Stetson Hatters men's basketball team =

American college basketball season

2021–22 Stetson Hatters men's basketball
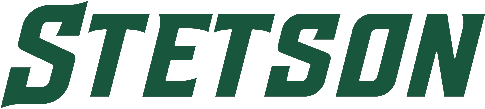
- Conference: ASUN Conference
- East Division
- Record: 11–19 (5–11 ASUN)
- Head coach: Donnie Jones (3rd season)
- Assistant coaches: Shawn Finney; Jonathan Mitchell; Adam Williams
- Home arena: Edmunds Center

2021–22 ASUN men's basketball standings
	Conf.				Overall
Team	W		L	PCT	W		L	PCT
East
Liberty	12	–	4	.750	22	–	11	.667
Jacksonville	11	–	5	.688	21	–	10	.677
Florida Gulf Coast	10	–	6	.625	22	–	12	.647
Kennesaw State	7	–	9	.438	13	–	18	.419
North Florida	7	–	9	.438	11	–	20	.355
Stetson	5	–	11	.313	11	–	19	.367
West
Jacksonville State^	13	–	3	.813	21	–	11	.656
Bellarmine* †	11	–	5	.688	20	–	13	.606
Central Arkansas	7	–	9	.438	11	–	20	.355
Lipscomb	6	–	10	.375	14	–	19	.424
Eastern Kentucky	5	–	11	.313	13	–	18	.419
North Alabama*	2	–	14	.125	9	–	21	.300
† 2022 ASUN tournament winner *Ineligible for the 2022 NCAA tournament due to transition from Division II^Due to Bellarmine's ineligibility, the regular-season champions Jacksonville State took their NCAA tournament berth instead.

The 2021–22 Stetson Hatters men's basketball team represented Stetson University in the 2021–22 NCAA Division I men's basketball season. The Hatters, led by third-year head coach Donnie Jones, played their home games at the Edmunds Center in DeLand, Florida as members of the East Division of the ASUN Conference. They finished the season 11–19, 5–11 in ASUN play to finish in last place in the East division. They lost in the first round of the ASUN tournament to Central Arkansas.

== Previous season ==
In a season limited due to the ongoing COVID-19 pandemic, the Hatters finished the 2020–21 season 12–15, 7–9 in ASUN play to finish in seventh place. In the ASUN tournament, the Hatters defeated Bellarmine before losing to Liberty in the semifinals. They received a bid to the College Basketball Invitational tournament. They defeated Bowling Green in the quarterfinals before losing to Coastal Carolina in the semifinals.

== Roster ==
2021–22 Stetson Hatters men's basketball team
Players
Coaches

Pos.	#	Name	Height	Weight	Year	Previous school	Hometown
G	0	Christiaan Jones	6 ft 5 in (1.96 m)	195 lb (88 kg)	GS	Cardinal Newman HS	Columbia, SC
G/F	1	Wheza Panzo	6 ft 7 in (2.01 m)	210 lb (95 kg)	Jr	The Potter's House (FL)	Mississauga, Ontario Canada
G	2	Rob Perry	6 ft 4 in (1.93 m)	210 lb (95 kg)	Jr	4A Sports Academy	Orlando, FL
G	3	Tasos Cook	6 ft 2 in (1.88 m)	180 lb (82 kg)	Fr	Westerville Central HS	Westerville, OH
G	4	Keith Lamar	6 ft 6 in (1.98 m)	190 lb (86 kg)	So	Eagle's Landing HS	Stockbridge, GA
G	5	Giancarlo Valdez	6 ft 3 in (1.91 m)	170 lb (77 kg)	So	Decatur Heritage Christian Academy	Santo Domingo, Dominican Republic
G	11	Chase Johnston	6 ft 2 in (1.88 m)	185 lb (84 kg)	So	Purdue Fort Wayne	Boca Raton, FL
F	12	Josh Smith	6 ft 8 in (2.03 m)	215 lb (98 kg)	So	Monrovia HS	Monrovia, IN
F/C	15	Mahamadou Diawara	6 ft 10 in (2.08 m)	249 lb (113 kg)	Jr	Massanutten Military Academy	Bamako, Mali
F/C	21	Aubin Gateretse	6 ft 11 in (2.11 m)	210 lb (95 kg)	Fr	Calusa Prep School	Charleroi, Belgium
G	22	Davante Robinson	6 ft 0 in (1.83 m)	190 lb (86 kg)	Jr	Destiny Christian School	Oklahoma City, OK
G/F	23	James Nichols	6 ft 5 in (1.96 m)	210 lb (95 kg)	Sr	Highlands Christian Academy	Deerfield Beach, FL
F/C	24	Alex Crawford	6 ft 7 in (2.01 m)	187 lb (85 kg)	Fr	Coronado HS	Chula Vista, CA
G	30	Stephan Swenson	6 ft 2 in (1.88 m)	195 lb (88 kg)	So	Westminster Academy	Brussels, Belgium
F	33	Wyatt Hollmann	6 ft 7 in (2.01 m)	210 lb (95 kg)	RS Jr	Embry–Riddle	DeLand, FL
F/C	35	Alvin Tumblin	6 ft 7 in (2.01 m)	205 lb (93 kg)	Fr	Santa Fe Catholic HS	Sebring, FL
G		Cyncier Harrison	5 ft 11 in (1.8 m)	160 lb (73 kg)	Fr	Providence Day School	Charlotte, NC

Head coach

- Donnie Jones (Pikeville)

Assistant coach(es)

- Shawn Finney (Fairmont State)
- Jonathan Mitchell (Rutgers)
- Adam Williams (Marshall)

Legend

- (C) Team captain
- (S) Suspended
- (I) Ineligible
- (W) Walk-on
- Injured
- Current redshirt

Roster
Last update: January 15, 2022

== Schedule and results ==
Date time, TV	Rank^{#}	Opponent^{#}	Result	Record	Site (attendance) city, state
Non-conference regular season
November 9, 2021*; 7:30 pm, YouTube		Florida Memorial	W 74–67	1–0	Edmunds Center (526); DeLand, FL
November 12, 2021*; 7:30 pm, ACCNX		at Georgia Tech	L 52–77	1–1	McCamish Pavilion (4,082); Atlanta, GA
November 17, 2021*; 7:00 pm, ESPN+		at Miami (OH)	L 65–80	1–2	Millett Hall (1,000); Oxford, OH
November 19, 2021*; 8:00 pm, ESPN+		at Lamar	W 60–59	2–2	Montagne Center (3,532); Beaumont, TX
November 27, 2021*; 3:00 pm, ESPN+		Campbell	L 58–60	2–3	Edmunds Center (387); DeLand, FL
December 1, 2021*; 7:00 pm, CUSA TV		at Florida Atlantic	L 73–83	2–4	FAU Arena (1,347); Boca Raton, FL
December 4, 2021*; 7:00 pm, CUSA TV		at FIU	L 65–72	2–5	Ocean Bank Convocation Center (0); Miami, FL
December 11, 2021*; 3:00 pm, ESPN+		Ohio	L 45–55	2–6	Edmunds Center (43); DeLand, FL
December 13, 2021*; 7:00 pm, ESPN+		Johnson (FL)	W 104–58	3–6	Edmunds Center (415); DeLand, FL
December 16, 2021*; 7:00 pm, ESPN+		College of Charleston	W 67–59	4–6	Edmunds Center (399); DeLand, FL
December 20, 2021*; 7:00 pm, ACCN		at Miami (FL)	L 72–82	4–7	Watsco Center (2,232); Coral Gables, FL
December 22, 2021*; 2:00 pm, ESPN+		Piedmont	W 97–53	5–7	Edmunds Center (348); DeLand, FL
December 30, 2021*; 3:00 pm, ESPN+		Point	W 77–65	6–7	Edmunds Center (310); DeLand, FL
ASUN regular season
January 4, 2022; 7:00 pm, ESPN+		Liberty	L 59–75	6–8 (0–1)	Edmunds Center (483); DeLand, FL
January 8, 2022; 5:00 pm, ESPN+		at North Florida	W 68–66 ^{OT}	7–8 (1–1)	UNF Arena (1,434); Jacksonville, FL
January 11, 2022; 7:00 pm, ESPN+		at Jacksonville	L 50–57	7–9 (1–2)	Swisher Gymnasium (987); Jacksonville, FL
January 15, 2022; 4:00 pm, ESPN+		Kennesaw State	L 49–77	7–10 (1–3)	Edmunds Center (464); DeLand, FL
January 18, 2022; 7:00 pm, ESPN+		Florida Gulf Coast	L 91–93 ^{OT}	7–11 (1–4)	Edmunds Center (0); DeLand, FL
January 22, 2022; 4:30 pm, ESPN+		at North Alabama	W 67–65	8–11 (2–4)	Flowers Hall (627); Florence, AL
January 27, 2022; 7:30 pm, ESPN+		Bellarmine	L 47–72	8–12 (2–5)	Edmunds Center (510); DeLand, FL
January 29, 2022; 4:00 pm, ESPN+		Eastern Kentucky	L 95–113	9–12 (3–5)	Edmunds Center (0); DeLand, FL
February 3, 2022; 8:15 pm, ESPN+		at Lipscomb	W 77–71	10–12 (4–5)	Allen Arena (2,655); Nashville, TN
February 5, 2022; 4:15 pm, ESPN+		at Central Arkansas	L 75–79	10–13 (4–6)	Farris Center (1,874); Conway, AR
February 9, 2022; 7:30 pm, ESPN+		Jacksonville State	W 63–57	11–13 (5–6)	Edmunds Center (654); DeLand, FL
February 12, 2022; 4:00 pm, ESPN+		at Florida Gulf Coast	L 82–89 ^{OT}	11–14 (5–7)	Alico Arena (2,369); Fort Myers, FL
February 16, 2022; 7:00 pm, ESPN+		Jacksonville	L 45–67	11–15 (5–8)	Edmunds Center (622); DeLand, FL
February 19, 2022; 7:00 pm, ESPN+		at Liberty	L 82–88	11–16 (5–9)	Liberty Arena (3,646); Lynchburg, VA
February 23, 2022; 7:00 pm, ESPN+		at Kennesaw State	L 71–75	11–17 (5–10)	KSU Convocation Center (917); Kennesaw, GA
February 26, 2022; 1:00 pm, ESPN+		North Florida	L 69–74 ^{OT}	11–18 (5–11)	Edmunds Center (704); DeLand, FL
ASUN tournament
March 1, 2022; 7:00 pm, ESPN+	(E6)	(W3) Central Arkansas; First round	L 73–74	11–19	Farris Center (2,055); Conway, AR
*Non-conference game. ^{#}Rankings from AP Poll. (#) Tournament seedings in parentheses. All times are in Eastern.
