= 2021–22 North Florida Ospreys men's basketball team =

American college basketball season

2021–22 North Florida Ospreys men's basketball
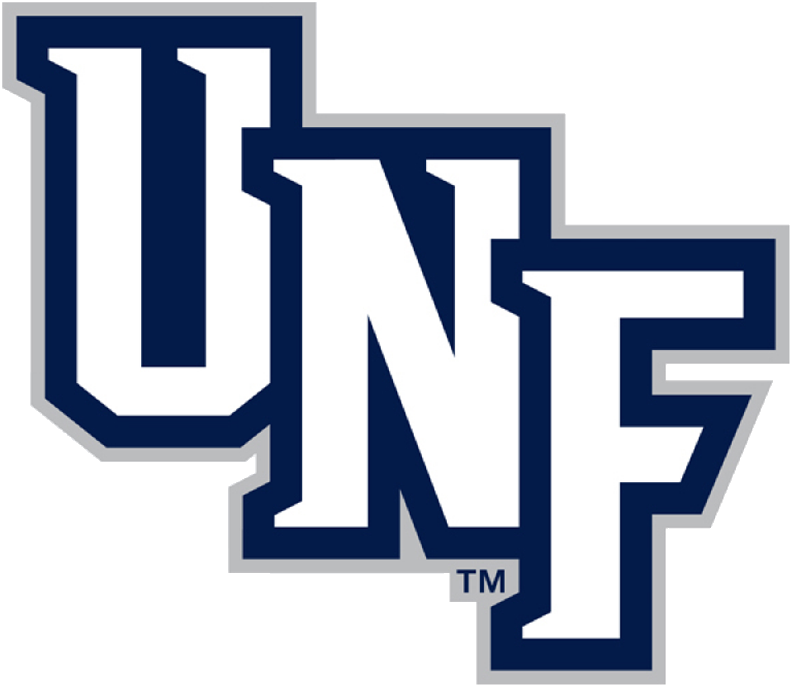
- Conference: ASUN Conference
- East Division
- Record: 11–20 (7–9 ASUN)
- Head coach: Matthew Driscoll (13th season)
- Associate head coach: Bobby Kennen
- Assistant coaches: Bruce Evans; Stephen Perkins
- Home arena: UNF Arena

2021–22 ASUN men's basketball standings
	Conf.				Overall
Team	W		L	PCT	W		L	PCT
East
Liberty	12	–	4	.750	22	–	11	.667
Jacksonville	11	–	5	.688	21	–	10	.677
Florida Gulf Coast	10	–	6	.625	22	–	12	.647
Kennesaw State	7	–	9	.438	13	–	18	.419
North Florida	7	–	9	.438	11	–	20	.355
Stetson	5	–	11	.313	11	–	19	.367
West
Jacksonville State^	13	–	3	.813	21	–	11	.656
Bellarmine* †	11	–	5	.688	20	–	13	.606
Central Arkansas	7	–	9	.438	11	–	20	.355
Lipscomb	6	–	10	.375	14	–	19	.424
Eastern Kentucky	5	–	11	.313	13	–	18	.419
North Alabama*	2	–	14	.125	9	–	21	.300
† 2022 ASUN tournament winner *Ineligible for the 2022 NCAA tournament due to transition from Division II^Due to Bellarmine's ineligibility, the regular-season champions Jacksonville State took their NCAA tournament berth instead.

The 2021–22 North Florida Ospreys men's basketball team represented the University of North Florida in the 2021–22 NCAA Division I men's basketball season. The Ospreys, led by 13th-year head coach Matthew Driscoll, played their home games at the UNF Arena in Jacksonville, Florida as members of the East Division of the ASUN Conference.

== Previous season ==
In a season limited due to the ongoing COVID-19 pandemic, the Ospreys finished the 2020–21 season 8–15, 6–6 in ASUN play, to finish in fourth place. In the ASUN tournament, they lost to North Alabama in the quarterfinals.

== Roster ==
2021–22 North Florida Ospreys men's basketball team
Players
Coaches

Pos.	#	Name	Height	Weight	Year	Previous school	Hometown
G	0	Emmanuel Adedoyin	6 ft 2 in (1.88 m)	161 lb (73 kg)	So	Oak Ridge HS	Orlando, FL
G	2	Chaz Lanier	6 ft 4 in (1.93 m)	175 lb (79 kg)	Fr	The Ensworth School	Nashville, TN
F	3	Carter Hendricksen	6 ft 7 in (2.01 m)	217 lb (98 kg)	Jr	Lexington Christian Academy	Mount Sterling, KY
G	4	Jordan Preaster	6 ft 6 in (1.98 m)	200 lb (91 kg)	So	Bethune–Cookman	Orlando, FL
G/F	5	Dorian James	6 ft 7 in (2.01 m)	202 lb (92 kg)	RS So	Chain of Lakes Collegiate HS	Winter Haven, FL
G	10	Jarius Hicklen	6 ft 3 in (1.91 m)	175 lb (79 kg)	So	Oklahoma Baptist	Dallas, TX
G	11	Brandon Rasmussen	6 ft 4 in (1.93 m)	183 lb (83 kg)	Fr	Potters House Academy	Christiansted, U.S. Virgin Islands
G	13	Max Hrdlicka	6 ft 6 in (1.98 m)	200 lb (91 kg)	Fr	Glynn Academy	Brunswick, GA
G	15	Jose Placer	6 ft 1 in (1.85 m)	174 lb (79 kg)	RS So	UMBC	Orlando, FL
F	21	Jonathan Aybar	6 ft 9 in (2.06 m)	183 lb (83 kg)	Fr	Central Pointe Christian Academy	Kissimmee, FL
G/F	23	Josh Berenbaum	6 ft 8 in (2.03 m)	215 lb (98 kg)	Fr	Calvary Christian HS	Clearwater, FL
F	24	Jadyn Parker	6 ft 10 in (2.08 m)	180 lb (82 kg)	Fr	West Brunswick HS	Shallotte, NC

Head coach

- Matthew Driscoll (Slippery Rock)

Assistant coach(es)

- Bobby Kennen (Palm Beach Atlantic)
- Bruce Evans (Furman)
- Stephen Perkins (Baylor)

Legend

- (C) Team captain
- (S) Suspended
- (I) Ineligible
- (W) Walk-on
- Injured
- Current redshirt

Roster
Last update: January 15, 2022

== Schedule and results ==
Date time, TV	Rank^{#}	Opponent^{#}	Result	Record	Site (attendance) city, state
Regular season
November 9, 2021*; 7:00 pm, ESPN+		at Texas Tech	L 74–89	0–1	United Supermarkets Arena (14,245); Lubbock, TX
November 10, 2021*; 7:00 pm, SECN+		at Texas A&M	L 46–64	0–2	Reed Arena (5,129); College Station, TX
November 12, 2021*; 7:00 pm, ESPN+		at Grand Canyon	L 51–65	0–3	GCU Arena (7,305); Phoenix, AZ
November 15, 2021*; 7:00 pm, P12N		at Arizona State	L 63–72	0–4	Desert Financial Arena (6,977); Tempe, AZ
November 17, 2021*; 7:30 pm, P12N		at No. 2 UCLA	L 63–98	0–5	Pauley Pavilion (7,103); Los Angeles, CA
November 20, 2021*; 2:00 pm		Webber International	W 103–43	1–5	UNF Arena (1,449); Jacksonville, FL
November 26, 2021*; 7:00 pm, SECN		at No. 10т Kentucky	L 52–86	1–6	Rupp Arena (19,350); Lexington, KY
November 28, 2021*; 12:00 pm		at FIU	L 69–84	1–7	Ocean Bank Convocation Center (223); Miami, FL
December 2, 2021*; 7:00 pm		Edward Waters	W 103–57	2–7	UNF Arena (1,727); Jacksonville, FL
December 5, 2021*; 2:00 pm, CUSA.tv		at FAU	L 41–76	2–8	FAU Arena (1,358); Boca Raton, FL
December 8, 2021*; 7:00 pm, SECN		at No. 20 Florida	L 55–85	2–9	O'Connell Center (7,705); Gainesville, FL
December 11, 2021*; 2:00 pm, ESPN+		Austin Peay	W 91–84	3–9	UNF Arena (1,872); Jacksonville, FL
December 18, 2021*; 2:00 pm, ESPN+		Trinity Baptist	W 92–44	4–9	UNF Arena (1,001); Jacksonville, FL
December 29, 2021*; 7:00 pm		at Kansas State	Canceled due to COVID-19 protocols		Bramlage Coliseum; Manhattan, KS
December 30, 2021*; 7:00 pm		Florida National	Canceled due to COVID-19 protocols		UNF Arena; Jacksonville, FL
December 31, 2021*; 7:00 pm		Keiser	Canceled due to COVID-19 protocols		UNF Arena; Jacksonville, FL
January 5, 2022; 7:30 pm, ESPN+		at Florida Gulf Coast	L 67–74	4–10 (0–1)	Alico Arena (1,830); Fort Myers, FL
January 8, 2022; 5:00 pm, ESPN+		Stetson	L 66–68 ^{OT}	4–11 (0–2)	UNF Arena (1,434); Jacksonville, FL
January 11, 2022; 7:00 pm, ESPN+		at Liberty	L 56–71	4–12 (0–3)	Liberty Arena (3,315); Lynchburg, VA
January 15, 2022; 5:00 pm, ESPN+		Jacksonville	L 51–54	4–13 (0–4)	UNF Arena (2,781); Jacksonville, FL
January 17, 2022; 7:00 pm, ESPN+		Kennesaw State	L 60–62	4–14 (0–5)	UNF Arena (1,357); Jacksonville, FL
January 20, 2022*; 12:00 pm, ACCRSN		at Florida State; Rescheduled from December 21	L 73–86	4–15	Donald L. Tucker Civic Center (2,088); Tallahassee, FL
January 22, 2022; 7:00 pm, ESPN+		at Eastern Kentucky	L 58–67	4–16 (0–6)	Alumni Coliseum (2,527); Richmond, KY
January 27, 2022; 7:00 pm, ESPN+		Central Arkansas	W 93–74	5–16 (1–6)	UNF Arena (1,447); Jacksonville, FL
January 29, 2022; 7:00 pm, ESPN+		Lipscomb	L 74–77	5–17 (1–7)	UNF Arena (1,793); Jacksonville, FL
February 3, 2022; 7:00 pm, ESPN+		at Jacksonville State	W 88–76	6–17 (2–7)	Pete Mathews Coliseum (2,312); Jacksonville, AL
February 5, 2022; 4:30 pm, ESPN+		at North Alabama	W 71–58	7–17 (3–7)	Flowers Hall (781); Florence, AL
February 9, 2022; 7:00 pm, ESPN+		Bellarmine	L 70–73	7–18 (3–8)	UNF Arena (1,329); Jacksonville, FL
February 12, 2022; 5:00 pm, ESPN+		at Kennesaw State	W 74–72	8–18 (4–8)	KSU Convocation Center (939); Kennesaw, GA
February 15, 2022; 7:00 pm, ESPN+		Liberty	W 72–69	9–18 (5–8)	UNF Arena (1,569); Jacksonville, FL
February 19, 2022; 5:00 pm, ESPN+		Florida Gulf Coast	W 70–64	10–18 (6–8)	UNF Arena (2,481); Jacksonville, FL
February 23, 2022; 7:00 pm, ESPN+		at Jacksonville	L 39–71	10–19 (6–9)	Swisher Gymnasium (1,489); Jacksonville, FL
February 26, 2022; 1:00 pm, ESPN+		at Stetson	W 84–79 ^{OT}	11–19 (7–9)	Edmunds Center (704); DeLand, FL
ASUN tournament
March 1, 2022; 7:00 pm, ESPN+	(E4)	at (W5) Lipscomb; First round	L 65–74	11–20	Allen Arena (1,079); Nashville, TN
*Non-conference game. ^{#}Rankings from AP poll. (#) Tournament seedings in parentheses. All times are in Eastern.
