= 2021–22 North Alabama Lions men's basketball team =

American college basketball season

2021–22 North Alabama Lions men's basketball
- Conference: ASUN Conference
- West Division
- Record: 9–21 (2–14 ASUN)
- Head coach: Tony Pujol (4th season)
- Assistant coaches: Ahmad Smith; Willie Watson; Tom Berryman
- Home arena: Flowers Hall

2021–22 ASUN men's basketball standings
	Conf.				Overall
Team	W		L	PCT	W		L	PCT
East
Liberty	12	–	4	.750	22	–	11	.667
Jacksonville	11	–	5	.688	21	–	10	.677
Florida Gulf Coast	10	–	6	.625	22	–	12	.647
Kennesaw State	7	–	9	.438	13	–	18	.419
North Florida	7	–	9	.438	11	–	20	.355
Stetson	5	–	11	.313	11	–	19	.367
West
Jacksonville State^	13	–	3	.813	21	–	11	.656
Bellarmine* †	11	–	5	.688	20	–	13	.606
Central Arkansas	7	–	9	.438	11	–	20	.355
Lipscomb	6	–	10	.375	14	–	19	.424
Eastern Kentucky	5	–	11	.313	13	–	18	.419
North Alabama*	2	–	14	.125	9	–	21	.300
† 2022 ASUN tournament winner *Ineligible for the 2022 NCAA tournament due to transition from Division II^Due to Bellarmine's ineligibility, the regular-season champions Jacksonville State took their NCAA tournament berth instead.

The 2021–22 North Alabama Lions men's basketball team represented the University of North Alabama in the 2021–22 NCAA Division I men's basketball season. The Lions, led by third-year head coach Tony Pujol, played their home games at Flowers Hall in Florence, Alabama, as members of the West division of the ASUN Conference. They finished the season 9–21, 2–14 in ASUN play to finish in last place in the West division. They lost to Florida Gulf Coast in the first round of the ASUN tournament.

This season marked North Alabama's final year of a four-year transition period from Division II to Division I. As a result, the Lions were not eligible for NCAA postseason play.

== Previous season ==
In a season limited due to the ongoing COVID-19 pandemic, the Lions finished the 2020–21 season 13–11, 7–8 in ASUN play to finish in fifth place. They defeated North Florida and Florida Gulf Coast before losing in the finals of the ASUN tournament to Liberty.

== Roster ==
2021–22 North Alabama Lions men's basketball team
Players
Coaches

Pos.	#	Name	Height	Weight	Year	Hometown
G	0	Will Soucie	6 ft 5 in (1.96 m)	200 lb (91 kg)	Fr	Califon, NJ
G	1	Detalian Brown	6 ft 3 in (1.91 m)	195 lb (88 kg)	Fr	Chicago, IL
G	2	Daniel Ortiz	6 ft 0 in (1.83 m)	180 lb (82 kg)	Fr	Shreveport, LA
G	3	Jamari Blackmon	6 ft 1 in (1.85 m)	205 lb (93 kg)	Jr	Hoover, AL
G	4	Omar Figueroa	6 ft 0 in (1.83 m)	165 lb (75 kg)	Fr	Carolina, Puerto Rico
C	10	Sawyer Wright	6 ft 8 in (2.03 m)	210 lb (95 kg)	Fr	Tuscumbia, AL
G	11	C.J. Brim	5 ft 9 in (1.75 m)	170 lb (77 kg)	Sr	Tupelo, MS
F	12	Isaac Chatman	6 ft 6 in (1.98 m)	200 lb (91 kg)	Jr	Cordova, AL
F	14	Payton Youngblood	6 ft 5 in (1.96 m)	200 lb (91 kg)	RS Sr	Birmingham, AL
F	23	Deraje Agbaosi	6 ft 8 in (2.03 m)	205 lb (93 kg)	Fr	Union, NJ
G	24	Aleksa Matic	6 ft 4 in (1.93 m)	210 lb (95 kg)	Jr	Belgrade, Serbia
F	33	Damian Forrest	6 ft 10 in (2.08 m)	220 lb (100 kg)	So	Fort Collins, CO
F	34	Dallas Howell	6 ft 7 in (2.01 m)	210 lb (95 kg)	Fr	Coffee Springs, AL
F	35	Pape Momar Cisse	6 ft 10 in (2.08 m)	195 lb (88 kg)	Fr	Dakar, Senegal

Head coach

- Tony Pujol (Sterling)

Assistant coach(es)

- Ahmad Smith (Cedar Valley)
- Willie Watson (Alabama)
- Tom Berryman (Alabama)

Legend

- (C) Team captain
- (S) Suspended
- (I) Ineligible
- (W) Walk-on
- Injured
- Current redshirt

Roster
Last update: January 12, 2022

== Schedule and results ==
Date time, TV	Rank^{#}	Opponent^{#}	Result	Record	High points	High rebounds	High assists	Site (attendance) city, state
Non-conference regular season
November 10, 2021*; 7:00 pm, SECN+		at Mississippi State	L 49–75	0–1	14 – Blackmon	6 – Chatman	4 – Brim	Humphrey Coliseum (6,671); Starkville, MS
November 13, 2021*; 4:00 pm		at Virgin Islands	W 99–47	1–1	20 – Ortiz	8 – Howell	6 – Ortiz	Sports & Fitness Center (56); Saint Thomas, U.S. Virgin Islands
November 19, 2021*; 6:30 pm, ESPN3		vs. Manhattan; MAAC/ASUN Challenge	L 51–55	1–2	13 – Blackmon	9 – Youngblood	2 – Blackmon	HP Field House (287); Kissimmee, FL
November 20, 2021*; 7:30 pm, ESPN3		vs. Iona; MAAC/ASUN Challenge	L 65–81	1–3	11 – 2 Tied	8 – Forrest	2 – Chatman	HP Field House (398); Kissimmee, FL
November 23, 2021*; 8:00 pm, ESPN+		Oakwood	W 105–50	2–3	15 – Youngblood	8 – Forrest	3 – 3 Tied	Flowers Hall (488); Florence, AL
November 28, 2021*; 3:30 pm, YouTube		at Alabama State	W 81–69	3–3	15 – 2 Tied	9 – Chatman	6 – Blackmon	Dunn–Oliver Acadome (450); Montgomery, AL
December 1, 2021*; 8:00 pm, ESPN+		Mississippi Valley State	W 72–58	4–3	13 – Youngblood	7 – Ortiz	3 – 3 Tied	Flowers Hall (543); Florence, AL
December 5, 2021*; 2:00 pm, ESPN+		Carver	W 103–40	5–3	22 – Ortiz	7 – Ortiz	3 – 5 Tied	Flowers Hall (229); Florence, AL
December 8, 2021*; 6:00 pm, ESPN+		Alabama A&M	W 56–45	6–3	12 – Ortiz	8 – Forrest	4 – Blackmon	Flowers Hall (633); Florence, AL
December 14, 2021*; 8:00 pm, SECN		at No. 13 Auburn	L 44–70	6–4	12 – Ortiz	7 – Forrest	2 – Ortiz	Auburn Arena (9,121); Auburn, AL
December 18, 2021*; 2:00 pm, ESPN+		Southeastern Baptist	W 106–40	7–4	23 – Figueroa	10 – Forrest	5 – Soucie	Flowers Hall (522); Florence, AL
December 22, 2021*; 6:00 pm, ESPN+		at UCF	L 64–75	7–5	17 – Blackmon	6 – Forrest	6 – Brim	Addition Financial Arena (3,273); Orlando, FL
December 28, 2021*; 4:00 pm		at No. 4 Gonzaga	L 63–93	7–6	15 – Brim	8 – Momar Cisse	2 – 2 Tied	McCarthey Athletic Center (6,000); Spokane, WA
ASUN Conference regular season
January 4, 2022; 7:00 pm, ESPN+		at Lipscomb	L 74–84	7–7 (0–1)	22 – Blackmon	7 – Youngblood	4 – Brim	Allen Arena (1,669); Nashville, TN
January 8, 2022; 8:00 pm, ESPN+		Jacksonville State	L 55–65	7–8 (0–2)	20 – Ortiz	7 – Momar Cisse	4 – Blackmon	Flowers Hall (1,029); Florence, AL
January 11, 2022; 6:00 pm, ESPN+		Eastern Kentucky	W 76–75	8–8 (1–2)	20 – Ortiz	10 – Forrest	4 – Brim	Flowers Hall (896); Florence, AL
January 15, 2022; 3:00 pm, ESPN+		at Central Arkansas	L 88–89 ^{OT}	8–9 (1–3)	23 – Soucie	7 – 2 Tied	3 – Brown	Farris Center (912); Conway, AR
January 18, 2022; 6:00 pm, ESPN+		at Bellarmine	L 60–68	8–10 (1–4)	15 – Ortiz	7 – Ortiz	3 – Brim	Freedom Hall (1,228); Louisville, KY
January 22, 2022; 3:30 pm, ESPN+		Stetson	L 65–67	8–11 (1–5)	24 – Blackmon	7 – Chatman	4 – Brim	Flowers Hall (627); Florence, AL
January 27, 2022; 6:00 pm, ESPN+		Liberty	L 53–72	8–12 (1–6)	14 – Brim	8 – Forrest	3 – Brim	Liberty Arena (2,860); Lynchburg, VA
January 29, 2022; 4:00 pm, ESPN+		at Kennesaw State	W 71–58	9–12 (2–6)	21 – Ortiz	8 – Brim	5 – Brim	KSU Convocation Center (1,194); Kennesaw, GA
February 3, 2022; 8:00 pm, ESPN+		Jacksonville	L 50–56	9–13 (2–7)	15 – Ortiz	9 – Chatman	3 – Brim	Flowers Hall (719); Florence, AL
February 5, 2022; 3:30 pm, ESPN+		North Florida	L 58–71	9–14 (2–8)	14 – Ortiz	11 – Chatman	3 – Blackmon	Flowers Hall (781); Florence, AL
February 9, 2022; 6:30 pm, ESPN+		at Florida Gulf Coast	L 60–92	9–15 (2–9)	12 – Ortiz	5 – Ortiz	1 – 4 Tied	Alico Arena (1,945); Fort Myers, FL
February 12, 2022; 3:30 pm, ESPN+		Bellarmine	L 69–75	9–16 (2–10)	18 – Brim	10 – Soucie	3 – Blackmon	Flowers Hall (687); Florence, AL
February 16, 2022; 6:30 pm, ESPN+		at Eastern Kentucky	L 76–80 ^{OT}	9–17 (2–11)	22 – Brim	14 – Howell	5 – Brim	Alumni Coliseum (2,177); Richmond, KY
February 19, 2022; 3:30 pm, ESPN+		Lipscomb	L 72–75	9–18 (2–12)	27 – Ortiz	9 – Soucie	5 – Brim	Flowers Hall (833); Florence, AL
February 23, 2022; 6:00 pm, ESPN+		Central Arkansas	L 72–81	9–19 (2–13)	31 – Ortiz	12 – Soucie	3 – Brown	Flowers Hall (724); Florence, AL
February 26, 2022; 1:00 pm, ESPN+		at Jacksonville State	L 52–69	9–20 (2–14)	27 – Ortiz	7 – Ortiz	1 – Tied	Pete Mathews Coliseum (2,280); Jacksonville, AL
ASUN tournament
March 1, 2022; 6:00 pm, ESPN+	(W6)	at (E3) Florida Gulf Coast; First round	L 72–81	9–21	29 – Ortiz	7 – Chatman	2 – Soucie	Alico Arena (2,043); Fort Myers, FL
*Non-conference game. ^{#}Rankings from AP Poll. (#) Tournament seedings in parentheses. All times are in Central.
