= 2021–22 Florida Gulf Coast Eagles men's basketball team =

American college basketball season

2021–22 Florida Gulf Coast Eagles men's basketball
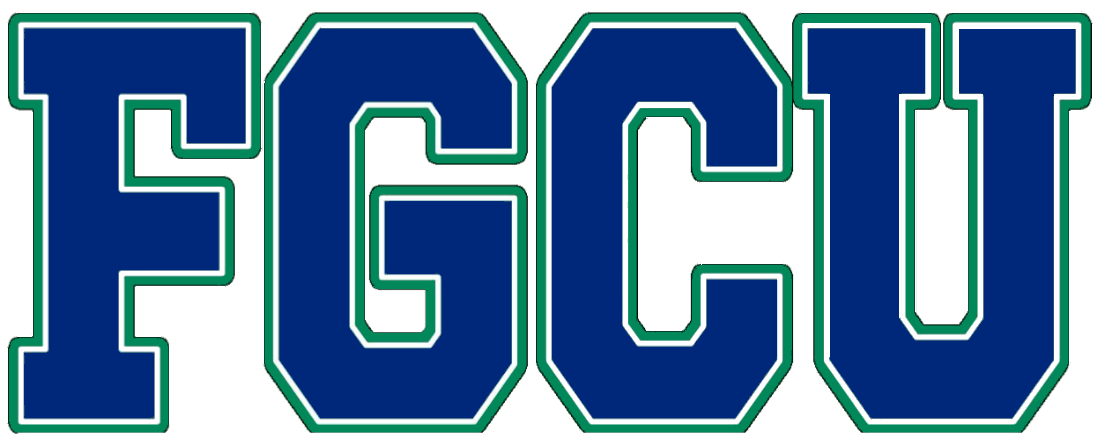

The Basketball Classic, Second Round
- Conference: ASUN Conference
- East Division
- Record: 22–12 (10–6 ASUN)
- Head coach: Michael Fly (4th season)
- Assistant coaches: Orin Bailey, Jr. (1st season); Justin Furr (4th season); Kevin Sutton (1st season)
- Home arena: Alico Arena

2021–22 ASUN men's basketball standings
	Conf.				Overall
Team	W		L	PCT	W		L	PCT
East
Liberty	12	–	4	.750	22	–	11	.667
Jacksonville	11	–	5	.688	21	–	10	.677
Florida Gulf Coast	10	–	6	.625	22	–	12	.647
Kennesaw State	7	–	9	.438	13	–	18	.419
North Florida	7	–	9	.438	11	–	20	.355
Stetson	5	–	11	.313	11	–	19	.367
West
Jacksonville State^	13	–	3	.813	21	–	11	.656
Bellarmine* †	11	–	5	.688	20	–	13	.606
Central Arkansas	7	–	9	.438	11	–	20	.355
Lipscomb	6	–	10	.375	14	–	19	.424
Eastern Kentucky	5	–	11	.313	13	–	18	.419
North Alabama*	2	–	14	.125	9	–	21	.300
† 2022 ASUN tournament winner *Ineligible for the 2022 NCAA tournament due to transition from Division II^Due to Bellarmine's ineligibility, the regular-season champions Jacksonville State took their NCAA tournament berth instead.

The 2021–22 Florida Gulf Coast Eagles men's basketball team represented Florida Gulf Coast University in the 2021–22 NCAA Division I men's basketball season. The Eagles, led by fourth-year head coach Michael Fly, played their home games at Alico Arena in Fort Myers, Florida as members of the East division of the ASUN Conference. They finished the regular season 21–11, 10–6 to finish in third place in the East division in ASUN play. They defeated North Alabama in the first round of the ASUN tournament before losing to Bellarmine in the quarterfinals. They received an invite to The Basketball Classic, formerly known as the CollegeInsider.com Tournament.

On March 5, 2022, the school fired Michael Fly as head coach. On March 14, the school named former Penn State head coach Pat Chambers the team's new head coach.

== Previous season ==
In a season limited due to the ongoing COVID-19 pandemic, the Eagles finished the 2020–21 season 10–8, 4–5 in ASUN Play to finish in sixth place. They lost in the semifinals of the ASUN tournament to North Alabama.

== Roster ==
2021–22 Florida Gulf Coast Eagles men's basketball team
Players
Coaches

Pos.	#	Name	Height	Weight	Year	Previous school	Hometown
F	0	Dakota Rivers	6 ft 8 in (2.03 m)	208 lb (94 kg)	Jr	Windermere HS	Windermere, FL
G	1	Luis Rolon	6 ft 2 in (1.88 m)	205 lb (93 kg)	So	Central Pointe Christian Academy	Ponce, Puerto Rico
G	2	Caleb Catto	6 ft 5 in (1.96 m)	182 lb (83 kg)	Sr	Southwest Florida Christian Academy	Cape Coral, FL
G	3	Franco Miller Jr.	6 ft 3 in (1.91 m)	201 lb (91 kg)	RS Jr	Ole Miss	Freeport, Bahamas
G	4	Cyrus Largie	6 ft 3 in (1.91 m)	204 lb (93 kg)	Jr	Mater Lakes Academy	Miramar, FL
G	5	Tavian Dunn-Martin	5 ft 8 in (1.73 m)	155 lb (70 kg)	GS	Duquesne	Huntington, WV
F	10	Zach Anderson	6 ft 7 in (2.01 m)	205 lb (93 kg)	So	Apopka HS	Apopka, FL
G	11	Matt Halvorsen	6 ft 1 in (1.85 m)	183 lb (83 kg)	GS	Western Carolina	Kingsport, TN
G	13	Victor Rosa	6 ft 5 in (1.96 m)	188 lb (85 kg)	So	Central Pointe Christian Academy	Naranjito, Puerto Rico
C	15	Andre Weir	6 ft 10 in (2.08 m)	265 lb (120 kg)	RS Fr	Richmond	Hollywood, FL
F	20	Chance Jackson (W)	6 ft 6 in (1.98 m)	202 lb (92 kg)	Jr	Plant HS	Tampa, Florida
C	21	Kevin Samuel	6 ft 11 in (2.11 m)	255 lb (116 kg)	Sr	TCU	Codrington Village, Barbuda
F	23	Carlos Rosario	6 ft 8 in (2.03 m)	220 lb (100 kg)	Jr	McNeese State	Santo Domingo, Dominican Republic
G	32	Austin Richie	6 ft 6 in (1.98 m)	226 lb (103 kg)	Sr	Tulsa	Glenwood, IL
F	44	Kyle Riemenschneider (W)	6 ft 5 in (1.96 m)	205 lb (93 kg)	So	Fort Myers HS	Fort Myers, FL
G	51	Lenny Ricca (W)	6 ft 2 in (1.88 m)	170 lb (77 kg)	Jr	St. Thomas Aquinas HS	Weston, FL

Head coach

- Michael Fly (Kentucky)

Assistant coach(es)

- Orin Bailey Jr. (Houston)
- Justin Furr (Wingate)
- Kevin Sutton (James Madison)

Legend

- (C) Team captain
- (S) Suspended
- (I) Ineligible
- (W) Walk-on
- Injured
- Current redshirt

Roster
Last update: January 15, 2022

== Schedule and results ==
Date time, TV	Rank^{#}	Opponent^{#}	Result	Record	Site (attendance) city, state
Non-conference regular season
November 9, 2021*; 7:30 pm, ESPN+		Florida National	W 94–57	1–0	Alico Arena (2,058); Fort Myers, FL
November 13, 2021*; 2:00 pm, ESPN+		at Loyola–Chicago	L 77–89	1–1	Joseph J. Gentile Arena (3,239); Chicago, IL
November 16, 2021*; 6:00 pm, ESPNU		No. 25 USC	L 61–78	1–2	Alico Arena (4,509); Fort Myers, FL
November 21, 2021*; 6:00 pm, ESPN+		Eckerd	W 99–59	2–2	Alico Arena (1,531); Fort Myers, FL
November 23, 2021*; 7:00 pm, ESPN+		Rhode Island	W 67–66	3–2	Alico Arena (2,231); Fort Myers, FL
November 26, 2021*; 7:00 pm, ESPN+		Western Michigan; Hilton Garden Inn FGCU Invitational	W 77–67	4–2	Alico Arena (1,962); Fort Myers, FL
November 27, 2021*; 7:00 pm, ESPN+		Southeastern Louisiana; Hilton Garden Inn FGCU Invitational	W 90–71	5–2	Alico Arena (1,857); Fort Myers, FL
November 28, 2021*; 6:00 pm, ESPN+		Purdue Fort Wayne; Hilton Garden Inn FGCU Invitational	W 85–78	6–2	Alico Arena (1,671); Fort Myers, FL
December 1, 2021*; 7:00 pm, ESPN+		at FIU	L 61–77	6–3	Ocean Bank Convocation Center (446); Miami, FL
December 4, 2021*; 7:00 pm, ESPN+		Dartmouth	W 78–68	7–3	Alico Arena (1,910); Fort Myers, FL
December 7, 2021*; 7:00 pm, Facebook Live		at Florida A&M	W 69–55	8–3	Al Lawson Center (2,313); Tallahassee, FL
December 11, 2021*; 7:00 pm, ESPN+		at Robert Morris	W 85–74	9–3	UPMC Events Center (1,171); Moon Township, PA
December 19, 2021*; 2:00 pm, ESPN+		Mercer	W 67–55	10–3	Alico Arena (1,711); Fort Myers, FL
December 22, 2021*; 7:00 pm, ESPN3		at Canisius	L 90-97 ^{OT}	10–4	Koessler Athletic Center (735); Buffalo, NY
ASUN regular season
January 5, 2022; 7:30 pm, ESPN+		North Florida	W 74–67	11–4 (1–0)	Alico Arena (1,830); Fort Myers, FL
January 8, 2022; 6:00 pm, ESPN+		at Jacksonville	L 66–69	11–5 (1–1)	Swisher Gymnasium (1,024); Jacksonville, FL
January 13, 2022; 4:00 pm, ESPN+		at Kennesaw State	L 53–77	11–6 (1–2)	KSU Convocation Center (628); Kennesaw, GA
January 15, 2022; 7:00 pm, ESPN+		Liberty	L 75–78	11–7 (1–3)	Alico Arena (2,358); Fort Myers, FL
January 18, 2022; 7:00 pm, ESPN+		at Stetson	W 93–91 ^{OT}	12–7 (2–3)	Edmunds Center (0); DeLand, FL
January 22, 2022; 5:00 pm, ESPN+		at Jacksonville State	L 71–79	12–8 (2–4)	Pete Mathews Coliseum (2,432); Jacksonville, AL
January 27, 2022; 5:00 pm, ESPN+		Eastern Kentucky	W 77–73	13–8 (3–4)	Alico Arena (2,234); Fort Myers, FL
January 29, 2022; 7:00 pm, ESPN+		Bellarmine	L 63–74	13–9 (3–5)	Alico Arena (2,536); Fort Myers, FL
February 3, 2022; 8:45 pm, ESPN+		at Central Arkansas	W 95–93 ^{OT}	14–9 (4–5)	Farris Center (1,085); Conway, AR
February 5, 2022; 5:00 pm, ESPN+		at Lipscomb	W 77–68	15–9 (5–5)	Allen Arena (2,660); Nashville, TN
February 9, 2022; 7:00 pm, ESPN+		North Alabama	W 92–60	16–9 (6–5)	Alico Arena (1,945); Fort Myers, FL
February 12, 2022; 4:00 pm, ESPN+		Stetson	W 89–82 ^{OT}	17–9 (7–5)	Alico Arena (2,369); Fort Myers, FL
February 16, 2022; 7:00 pm, ESPN+		Kennesaw State	W 82–76	18–9 (8–5)	Alico Arena (1,857); Fort Myers, FL
February 19, 2022; 5:00 pm, ESPN+		at North Florida	L 64–70	18–10 (8–6)	UNF Arena (2,481); Jacksonville, FL
February 23, 2022; 7:00 pm, ESPN+		at Liberty	W 82–72 ^{OT}	19–10 (9–6)	Liberty Arena (3,583); Lynchburg, VA
February 26, 2022; 1:00 pm, ESPN+		Jacksonville	W 76–69	20–10 (10–6)	Alico Arena (2,589); Fort Myers, FL
ASUN tournament
March 1, 2022; 7:00 pm, ESPN+	(E3)	(W6) North Alabama; First round	W 81–72	21–10	Alico Arena (2,043); Fort Myers, FL
March 3, 2022; 7:00 pm, ESPN+	(E3)	at (W2) Bellarmine; Quarterfinals	L 68–81	21–11	Freedom Hall (1,593); Louisville, KY
The Basketball Classic
March 16, 2022*; 7:00 pm, ESPN+		Detroit Mercy; First round	W 95–79	22–11	Alico Arena; Fort Myers, FL
March 21, 2022*; 7:00 pm, ESPN+		at Coastal Carolina; Second round	L 68–84	22–12	HTC Center (825); Conway, SC
*Non-conference game. ^{#}Rankings from AP Poll. (#) Tournament seedings in parentheses. All times are in Eastern Time.
