= 2021–22 Jacksonville State Gamecocks men's basketball team =

American college basketball season

2021–22 Jacksonville State Gamecocks men's basketball

Atlantic Sun regular season and West Division champions

NCAA tournament, First Round
- Conference: ASUN Conference
- West Division
- Record: 21–11 (13–3 ASUN)
- Head coach: Ray Harper (6th season)
- Assistant coaches: Tommy Wade; Jake Morton; Tysor Anderson
- Home arena: Pete Mathews Coliseum

2021–22 ASUN men's basketball standings
	Conf.				Overall
Team	W		L	PCT	W		L	PCT
East
Liberty	12	–	4	.750	22	–	11	.667
Jacksonville	11	–	5	.688	21	–	10	.677
Florida Gulf Coast	10	–	6	.625	22	–	12	.647
Kennesaw State	7	–	9	.438	13	–	18	.419
North Florida	7	–	9	.438	11	–	20	.355
Stetson	5	–	11	.313	11	–	19	.367
West
Jacksonville State^	13	–	3	.813	21	–	11	.656
Bellarmine* †	11	–	5	.688	20	–	13	.606
Central Arkansas	7	–	9	.438	11	–	20	.355
Lipscomb	6	–	10	.375	14	–	19	.424
Eastern Kentucky	5	–	11	.313	13	–	18	.419
North Alabama*	2	–	14	.125	9	–	21	.300
† 2022 ASUN tournament winner *Ineligible for the 2022 NCAA tournament due to transition from Division II^Due to Bellarmine's ineligibility, the regular-season champions Jacksonville State took their NCAA tournament berth instead.

The 2021–22 Jacksonville State Gamecocks men's basketball team represented Jacksonville State University in the 2021–22 NCAA Division I men's basketball season. The Gamecocks, led by sixth-year head coach Ray Harper, played home games at the Pete Mathews Coliseum in Jacksonville, Alabama. JSU returned to the ASUN Conference, which it had left in 2003 to join the OVC, on July 1, 2021. Although Jacksonville State lost the conference semifinal to Jacksonville, Jacksonville State got the ASUN automatic bid as the conference tournament champion Bellarmine were ineligible for the NCAA tournament due to them undergoing their transition to Division I, with Jacksonville State earning the bid due to them winning the regular season title. They lost in the first round of the NCAA Tournament to Auburn.

== Previous season ==
In a season limited due to the ongoing COVID-19 pandemic, the Gamecocks finished the 2020–21 season 18–9, 13–6 in OVC play to finish in fourth place. They lost in the semifinals of the OVC tournament to Belmont.

== Roster ==
2021–22 Jacksonville State Gamecocks men's basketball team
Players
Coaches

Pos.	#	Name	Height	Weight	Year	Hometown
G	0	Jalen Finch	6 ft 1 in (1.85 m)	165 lb (75 kg)	Jr	Raleigh, NC
G	1	Demaree King	6 ft 0 in (1.83 m)	180 lb (82 kg)	Jr	Tulsa, OK
G	2	Semaj Henderson	6 ft 2 in (1.88 m)	180 lb (82 kg)	Fr	Chicago, IL
C	3	Maros Zeliznak	6 ft 11 in (2.11 m)	265 lb (120 kg)	Jr	Košice, Slovakia
F	4	Marcellus Brigham Jr.	6 ft 7 in (2.01 m)	210 lb (95 kg)	Fr	Memphis, TN
F	5	Caleb Byrd	6 ft 7 in (2.01 m)	160 lb (73 kg)	Fr	Atlanta, GA
F	10	Juwan Perdue	6 ft 6 in (1.98 m)	200 lb (91 kg)	So	Sumter, SC
G/F	11	Kayne Henry	6 ft 7 in (2.01 m)	210 lb (95 kg)	Sr	London, England
G/F	13	Jay Pal	6 ft 9 in (2.06 m)	190 lb (86 kg)	So	Omaha, NE
G	15	JJ Platt	6 ft 1 in (1.85 m)	180 lb (82 kg)	Fr	Nashville, TN
G	20	Tanguy Touze	6 ft 3 in (1.91 m)	180 lb (82 kg)	Fr	Pontault-Combault, France
G	22	Jalen Gibbs	6 ft 3 in (1.91 m)	185 lb (84 kg)	Sr	Indian Head, MD
G	23	Darian Adams	6 ft 3 in (1.91 m)	200 lb (91 kg)	Sr	Montgomery, AL
F	24	Amanze Ngumezi	6 ft 9 in (2.06 m)	245 lb (111 kg)	Jr	Savannah, GA
F/C	50	Brandon Huffman	6 ft 10 in (2.08 m)	255 lb (116 kg)	Sr	Goldsboro, NC
G	55	Cam Pope	6 ft 1 in (1.85 m)	180 lb (82 kg)	Fr	Louisville, KY

Head coach

- Ray Harper (Kentucky Wesleyan)

Assistant coach(es)

- Tommy Wade (Southeast Missouri State)
- Jake Morton (Miami (FL))
- Tysor Anderson (Georgia Tech)

Legend

- (C) Team captain
- (S) Suspended
- (I) Ineligible
- (W) Walk-on
- Injured
- Current redshirt

Roster
Last update: January 12, 2022

== Schedule and results ==
Date time, TV	Rank^{#}	Opponent^{#}	Result	Record	High points	High rebounds	High assists	Site (attendance) city, state
Exhibition
November 3, 2021*; 6:00 pm		Georgia Southwestern State	W 82–63		17 – Adams	9 – 2 Tied	5 – Gibbs	Pete Mathews Coliseum (303); Jacksonville, AL
Non-conference regular season
November 9, 2021*; 7:00 pm, ESPN+		at Wichita State	L 57–60	0–1	15 – Henry	7 – Huffman	8 – Adams	Charles Koch Arena (8,040); Wichita, KS
November 13, 2021*; 4:00 pm, ESPN+		Alabama A&M	W 70–47	1–1	15 – Gibbs	10 – Huffman	6 – 2 Tied	Pete Mathews Coliseum (749); Jacksonville, AL
November 16, 2021*; 6:00 pm, ESPN+		at Troy	L 65–69 ^{3OT}	1–2	20 – Finch	10 – Henry	5 – Adams	Trojan Arena (2,159); Troy, AL
November 22, 2021*; 4:30 pm, FloHoops		vs. Valparaiso; Nassau Championship quarterfinal	L 70–78	1–3	23 – King	9 – Huffman	5 – Adams	Baha Mar Convention Center (0); Nassau, Bahamas
November 24, 2021*; 1:30 pm, FloHoops		vs. Drexel; Nassau Championship 5th place game	W 72–64	2–3	16 – 2 Tied	6 – Henry	3 – Adams	Baha Mar Convention Center (0); Nassau, Bahamas
November 27, 2021*; 12:00 pm, FloHoops		at Elon	W 93–81	3–3	40 – Gibbs	7 – Huffman	8 – King	Schar Center (1,522); Elon, NC
December 4, 2021*; 7:30 pm, ESPN+		South Alabama	L 64–74	3–4	17 – Adams	6 – Henry	5 – Finch	Pete Mathews Coliseum (804); Jacksonville, AL
December 8, 2021; 6:00 pm, ESPN+		at VCU	L 52–66	3–5	12 – Gibbs	7 – Huffman	3 – Finch	Siegel Center (6,621); Richmond, VA
December 13, 2021; 6:00 pm, ESPN+		LaGrange College	W 110–80	4–5	31 – Adams	11 – Pal	7 – Adams	Pete Mathews Coliseum (413); Jacksonville, AL
December 15, 2021; 6:00 pm, ESPN+		FIU	W 66–59	5–5	16 – Gibbs	5 – 3 Tied	3 – Adams	Pete Mathews Coliseum (515); Jacksonville, AL
December 18, 2021; 7:30 pm, SECN		at No. 6 Alabama	L 59–65	5–6	18 – Adams	7 – 2 Tied	3 – King	Coleman Coliseum (10,064); Tuscaloosa, AL
December 21, 2021; 2:00 pm, ESPN+		at Little Rock	W 87–67	6–6	32 – King	8 – 2 Tied	10 – Finch	Jack Stephens Center (977); Little Rock, AR
December 28, 2021; 6:00 pm, ESPN+		Carver	W 123–59	7–6	21 – King	8 – Henry	10 – Finch	Pete Mathews Coliseum (428); Jacksonville, AL
December 30, 2021; 7:30 pm, ESPN+		Middle Georgia	Canceled due to COVID-19 protocols					Pete Mathews Coliseum; Jacksonville, AL
ASUN Conference regular season
January 8, 2022; 8:00 pm, ESPN+		at North Alabama	W 65–55	8–6 (1–0)	18 – Adams	7 – Adams	3 – Finch	Flowers Hall (1,029); Florence, AL
January 11, 2022; 6:00 pm, ESPN+		Lipscomb	W 88–83	9–6 (2–0)	24 – Adams	8 – Adams	10 – Adams	Pete Mathews Coliseum (2,216); Jacksonville, AL
January 15, 2022; 6:00 pm, ESPN+		at Eastern Kentucky	W 76–65	10–6 (3–0)	21 – Gibbs	13 – Huffman	7 – Finch	Alumni Coliseum (2,479); Richmond, KY
January 18, 2022; 7:00 pm, ESPN+		at Central Arkansas	W 86–81	11–6 (4–0)	20 – King	7 – Adams	6 – 2 Tied	Farris Center (1,945); Conway, AR
January 22, 2022; 4:00 pm, ESPN+		Florida Gulf Coast	W 79–71	12–6 (5–0)	20 – King	10 – Huffman	4 – King	Pete Mathews Coliseum (2,432); Jacksonville, AL
January 24, 2022; 6:00 pm, ESPN+		Bellarmine; Rescheduled from January 4	W 65–60	13–6 (6–0)	24 – Henry	9 – Finch	4 – Finch	Pete Mathews Coliseum (2,287); Jacksonville, AL
January 27, 2022; 6:30 pm, ESPN+		at Kennesaw State	W 70–64	14–6 (7–0)	22 – Adams	10 – Huffman	8 – Finch	KSU Convocation Center (1,531); Kennesaw, GA
January 29, 2022; 6:00 pm, ESPN+		at Liberty	W 77–67	15–6 (8–0)	21 – Gibbs	7 – 2 Tied	6 – Finch	Liberty Arena (3,272); Lynchburg, VA
February 3, 2022; 7:30 pm, ESPN+		North Florida	L 76–88	15–7 (8–1)	19 – Huffman	8 – Henry	4 – Henry	Pete Mathews Coliseum (2,312); Jacksonville, AL
February 5, 2022; 4:00 pm, ESPN+		Jacksonville	W 64–58	16–7 (9–1)	22 – Adams	13 – Henry	6 – Finch	Pete Mathews Coliseum (2,978); Jacksonville, AL
February 9, 2022; 6:00 pm, ESPN+		at Stetson	L 57–63	16–8 (9–2)	19 – Adams	11 – Huffman	3 – Finch	Edmunds Center (654); DeLand, FL
February 12, 2022; 4:00 pm, ESPN+		Central Arkansas	L 62–72	16–9 (9–3)	15 – Adams	10 – Henry	4 – Adams	Pete Mathews Coliseum (2,856); Jacksonville, AL
February 16, 2022; 6:00 pm, ESPN+		at Lipscomb	W 78–67	17–9 (10–3)	21 – Finch	8 – Adams	6 – Finch	Allen Arena (1,795); Nashville, TN
February 20, 2022; 6:00 pm, ESPN+		at Bellarmine	W 82–67	18–9 (11–3)	22 – Gibbs	6 – Henry	6 – Finch	Freedom Hall (2,375); Louisville, KY
February 23, 2022; 6:00 pm, ESPN+		Eastern Kentucky	W 81–68	19–9 (12–3)	27 – Adams	7 – Huffman	6 – Finch	Pete Mathews Coliseum (2,433); Jacksonville, AL
February 26, 2022; 1:00 pm, ESPN+		North Alabama	W 69–52	20–9 (13–3)	13 – Adams	5 – Tied	4 – Finch	Pete Mathews Coliseum (2,280); Jacksonville, AL
ASUN tournament
March 3, 2022; 7:00 pm, ESPN+	(W1)	(E4) Kennesaw State; Quarterfinals	W 78–67	21–9	17 – Adams	9 – Zeliznak	5 – Adams	Pete Mathews Coliseum (2,732); Jacksonville, AL
March 5, 2022; 7:00 pm, ESPN+	(W1)	(E2) Jacksonville; Semifinals	L 51–54	21–10	14 – Henry	7 – Zeliznak	5 – Finch	Pete Mathews Coliseum (2,950); Jacksonville, AL
NCAA tournament
March 18, 2022; 11:40 am, TruTV	(15 MW)	vs. (2 MW) No. 8 Auburn; First Round	L 61–80	21–11	20 – Gibbs	7 – Huffman	5 – King	Bon Secours Wellness Arena (14,255); Greenville, SC
*Non-conference game. ^{#}Rankings from AP Poll. (#) Tournament seedings in parentheses. All times are in Central.
