= 2021–22 Bellarmine Knights men's basketball team =

American college basketball season

2021–22 Bellarmine Knights men's basketball
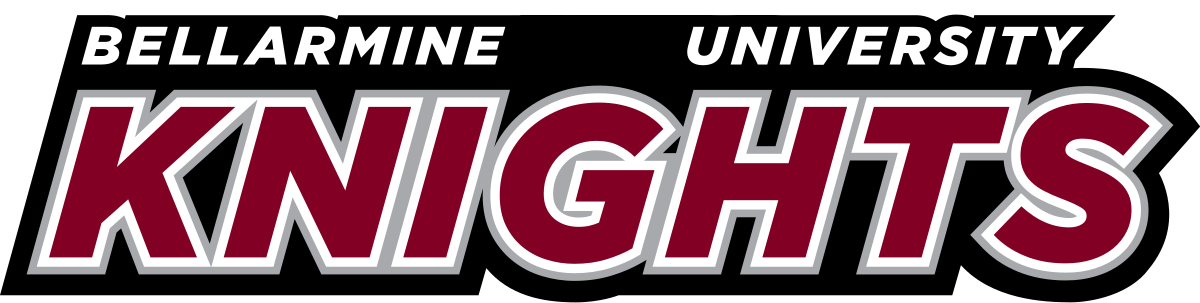

ASUN tournament champions
- Conference: ASUN Conference
- Record: 20–13 (11–5 ASUN)
- Head coach: Scott Davenport (17th season)
- Assistant coaches: Doug Davenport; Beau Braden; Al Davis
- Home arena: Freedom Hall

2021–22 ASUN men's basketball standings
	Conf.				Overall
Team	W		L	PCT	W		L	PCT
East
Liberty	12	–	4	.750	22	–	11	.667
Jacksonville	11	–	5	.688	21	–	10	.677
Florida Gulf Coast	10	–	6	.625	22	–	12	.647
Kennesaw State	7	–	9	.438	13	–	18	.419
North Florida	7	–	9	.438	11	–	20	.355
Stetson	5	–	11	.313	11	–	19	.367
West
Jacksonville State^	13	–	3	.813	21	–	11	.656
Bellarmine* †	11	–	5	.688	20	–	13	.606
Central Arkansas	7	–	9	.438	11	–	20	.355
Lipscomb	6	–	10	.375	14	–	19	.424
Eastern Kentucky	5	–	11	.313	13	–	18	.419
North Alabama*	2	–	14	.125	9	–	21	.300
† 2022 ASUN tournament winner *Ineligible for the 2022 NCAA tournament due to transition from Division II^Due to Bellarmine's ineligibility, the regular-season champions Jacksonville State took their NCAA tournament berth instead.

The 2021–22 Bellarmine Knights men's basketball team represented Bellarmine University in the 2021–22 NCAA Division I men's basketball season. The Knights, led by 17th-year head coach Scott Davenport, played their home games at Freedom Hall in Louisville, Kentucky as members of the West Division of the ASUN Conference. They finished the season 20–13, 11–5 in ASUN play, to finish in second place in the West division. They defeated Florida Gulf Coast, Liberty, and Jacksonville to win the ASUN tournament championship. Because the Knights were in the second year of a four-year transition period from Division II to Division I, they were not eligible for NCAA postseason play. As a result, the conference's automatic bid to the NCAA tournament went to regular season champion Jacksonville State.

== Previous season ==
In a season limited due to the ongoing COVID-19 pandemic, the Knights finished the 2020–21 season 14–8, 10–3 in ASUN play, to finish in second place. The season marked Bellarmine's first year of a four-year transition period from Division II to Division I. They lost in the first round of the ASUN tournament to Stetson. They received an invitation to the College Basketball Invitational tournament where they defeated Army in the quarterfinals before losing in the semifinals to Pepperdine.

== Roster ==
2021–22 Bellarmine Knights men's basketball team
Players
Coaches

Pos.	#	Name	Height	Weight	Year	Previous school	Hometown
F	0	Ethan Claycomb	6 ft 7 in (2.01 m)	205 lb (93 kg)	GS	Indiana State	Vincennes, IN
G	1	Juston Betz	6 ft 3 in (1.91 m)	190 lb (86 kg)	RS Sr	Providence	New Albany, IN
G	2	Alec Pfriem	6 ft 5 in (1.96 m)	205 lb (93 kg)	Jr	Moeller HS	Cincinnati, OH
G	4	Landin Hacker	6 ft 0 in (1.83 m)	180 lb (82 kg)	Fr	Center Grove HS	Greenwood, IN
G	5	Ben Johnson	6 ft 3 in (1.91 m)	185 lb (84 kg)	Fr	Lexington Christian Academy	Lexington, KY
G	10	Garrett Tipton	6 ft 4 in (1.93 m)	195 lb (88 kg)	RS Jr	Bishop Hartley HS	Columbus, OH
G	13	Dylan Penn	6 ft 3 in (1.91 m)	190 lb (86 kg)	Sr	Reitz Memorial HS	Evansville, IN
F	14	Sam DeVault	6 ft 10 in (2.08 m)	220 lb (100 kg)	Jr	Austin Peay	Evansville, IN
G	20	Jaylen Fairman	6 ft 2 in (1.88 m)	180 lb (82 kg)	Fr	Jeffersonville HS	Jeffersonville, IN
G	22	Bash Wieland	6 ft 6 in (1.98 m)	205 lb (93 kg)	Jr	Lakota East HS	Cincinnati, OH
F	23	Ayden Mudd	6 ft 7 in (2.01 m)	195 lb (88 kg)	Fr	St. Xavier HS	Louisville, KY
F	24	Eli Roberts	6 ft 7 in (2.01 m)	220 lb (100 kg)	So	Manual HS	Louisville, KY
G	25	CJ Fleming	6 ft 0 in (1.83 m)	180 lb (82 kg)	GS	La Salle HS	Cincinnati, OH
F	30	Nick Thelen	6 ft 7 in (2.01 m)	220 lb (100 kg)	Jr	Covington Catholic HS	Edgewood, KY
C	33	Baylor Younker	6 ft 10 in (2.08 m)	220 lb (100 kg)	RS Jr	Grace Christian Academy (TN)	Knoxville, TN
G	34	Drew Comer	6 ft 4 in (1.93 m)	185 lb (84 kg)	RS So	Greensburg HS	Greensburg, IN
F	42	Curt Hopf	6 ft 8 in (2.03 m)	220 lb (100 kg)	Fr	Barr-Reeve HS	Ferdinand, IN
G	55	Zac Jennings	6 ft 5 in (1.96 m)	205 lb (93 kg)	So	Cooper HS	Burlington, KY

Head coach

- Scott Davenport (Louisville)

Assistant coach(es)

- Doug Davenport (Bellarmine)
- Beau Braden (Centre)
- Al Davis (Bellarmine)

Legend

- (C) Team captain
- (S) Suspended
- (I) Ineligible
- (W) Walk-on
- Injured
- Current redshirt

Roster
Last update: January 15, 2022

== Schedule and results ==
Date time, TV	Rank^{#}	Opponent^{#}	Result	Record	Site (attendance) city, state
Exhibition
October 28, 2021*; 7:00 pm		Tiffin	W 90–87		Freedom Hall (1,313); Louisville, KY
Non-conference regular season
November 9, 2021*; 7:00 pm, BTN+		at No. 7 Purdue	L 67–96	0–1	Mackey Arena (14,804); West Lafayette, IN
November 13, 2021*; 8:00 pm, ESPN+		at Murray State	L 59–78	0–2	CFSB Center (3,613); Murray, KY
November 17, 2021*; 10:00 pm, WCC Network		at Saint Mary's	L 64–73	0–3	University Credit Union Pavilion (2,265); Moraga, CA
November 19, 2021*; 9:00 pm, RTNW		at No. 1 Gonzaga	L 50–92	0–4	McCarthey Athletic Center (6,000); Spokane, WA
November 22, 2021*; 8:00 pm, ESPN+		vs. No. 2 UCLA; Empire Classic	L 62–75	0–5	T-Mobile Arena (7,001); Las Vegas, NV
November 23, 2021*; 7:00 pm, ESPN+		vs. Central Michigan; Empire Classic	W 76–69	1–5	T-Mobile Arena; Las Vegas, NV
November 28, 2021*; 3:00 pm, ESPN+		Franklin	W 75–38	2–5	Freedom Hall (1,117); Louisville, KY
November 30, 2021*; 7:00 pm, ESPN+		at West Virginia	L 55–74	2–6	WVU Coliseum (9,523); Morgantown, WV
December 5, 2021*; 3:00 pm, ESPN+		Defiance	W 92–43	3–6	Freedom Hall (911); Louisville, KY
December 9, 2021*; 7:00 pm, ESPN+		Asbury	W 87–55	4–6	KFC Yum! Center (863); Louisville, KY
December 10, 2021*; 7:00 pm, ESPN+		Midway	W 89–39	5–6	Freedom Hall (710); Louisville, KY
December 15, 2021*; 8:00 pm		at South Dakota	L 64–78	5–7	Sanford Coyote Sports Center (753); Vermillion, SD
December 18, 2021*; 2:00 pm, ESPN3		at Miami (OH)	W 77–68	6–7	Millett Hall (1,202); Oxford, OH
December 21, 2021*; 7:00 pm, ESPN+		Loyola Marymount	L 57–71	6–8	Freedom Hall (1,519); Louisville, KY
December 29, 2021*; 8:00 pm		at Bradley	Canceled due to COVID-19 issues		Peoria Civic Center; Peoria, IL
ASUN Conference regular season
January 8, 2022; 7:00 pm, ESPN+		Eastern Kentucky	W 66–61	7–8 (1–0)	Freedom Hall (2,782); Louisville, KY
January 11, 2022; 7:00 pm, ESPN+		Central Arkansas	W 85–63	8–8 (2–0)	Freedom Hall (1,571); Louisville, KY
January 15, 2022; 5:00 pm, ESPN+		at Lipscomb	W 77–71	9–8 (3–0)	Allen Arena (3,026); Nashville, TN
January 18, 2022; 7:00 pm, ESPN+		North Alabama	W 68–60	10–8 (4–0)	Freedom Hall (1,228); Louisville, KY
January 22, 2022; 7:00 pm, ESPN+		Jacksonville	W 76–73 ^{OT}	11–8 (5–0)	Freedom Hall (1,839); Louisville, KY
January 24, 2022; 7:00 pm, ESPN+		at Jacksonville State; Rescheduled from January 4	L 60–65	11–9 (5–1)	Pete Mathews Coliseum (2,287); Jacksonville, AL
January 27, 2022; 7:30 pm, ESPN+		at Stetson	W 72–47	12–9 (6–1)	Edmunds Center (510); DeLand, FL
January 29, 2022; 7:00 pm, ESPN+		at Florida Gulf Coast	W 74–63	13–9 (7–1)	Alico Arena (2,536); Fort Myers, FL
February 3, 2022; 1:30 pm, ESPN+		Liberty	L 53–66	13–10 (7–2)	Freedom Hall (743); Louisville, KY
February 5, 2022; 7:00 pm, ESPN+		Kennesaw State	L 70–75	13–11 (7–3)	Freedom Hall (1,564); Louisville, KY
February 9, 2022; 7:00 pm, ESPN+		at North Florida	W 73–70	14–11 (8–3)	UNF Arena (1,329); Jacksonville, FL
February 12, 2022; 4:30 pm, ESPN+		at North Alabama	W 75–69	15–11 (9–3)	Flowers Hall (687); Florence, AL
February 16, 2022; 8:00 pm, ESPN+		at Central Arkansas	W 79–69	16–11 (10–3)	Farris Center (1,918); Conway, AR
February 20, 2022; 7:00 pm, ESPN+		Jacksonville State	L 67–82	16–12 (10–4)	Freedom Hall (2,375); Louisville, KY
February 23, 2022; 7:00 pm, ESPN+		Lipscomb	W 76–73	17–12 (11–4)	Freedom Hall (1,376); Louisville, KY
February 26, 2022; 1:00 pm, ESPN+		at Eastern Kentucky	L 58–72	17–13 (11–5)	Alumni Coliseum (4,911); Richmond, KY
ASUN tournament
March 3, 2022; 7:00 pm, ESPN+	(W2)	(E3) Florida Gulf Coast; Quarterfinals	W 81–68	18–13	Freedom Hall (1,593); Louisville, KY
March 5, 2022; 6:00 pm, ESPN+	(W2)	at (E1) Liberty; Semifinals	W 53–50	19–13	Liberty Arena (3,515); Lynchburg, VA
March 8, 2022; 5:00 pm, ESPN2	(W2)	(E2) Jacksonville; Championship	W 77–72	20–13	Freedom Hall (6,251); Louisville, KY
*Non-conference game. ^{#}Rankings from AP poll. (#) Tournament seedings in parentheses. All times are in Eastern.
