= 2021–22 Central Arkansas Bears basketball team =

American college basketball season

2021–22 Central Arkansas Bears basketball
- Conference: ASUN Conference
- West Division
- Record: 11–20 (7–9 ASUN)
- Head coach: Anthony Boone (2nd season)
- Assistant coaches: Jeff Price; Brock Widders; John Cranford
- Home arena: Farris Center (Capacity: 6,000)

2021–22 ASUN men's basketball standings
	Conf.				Overall
Team	W		L	PCT	W		L	PCT
East
Liberty	12	–	4	.750	22	–	11	.667
Jacksonville	11	–	5	.688	21	–	10	.677
Florida Gulf Coast	10	–	6	.625	22	–	12	.647
Kennesaw State	7	–	9	.438	13	–	18	.419
North Florida	7	–	9	.438	11	–	20	.355
Stetson	5	–	11	.313	11	–	19	.367
West
Jacksonville State^	13	–	3	.813	21	–	11	.656
Bellarmine* †	11	–	5	.688	20	–	13	.606
Central Arkansas	7	–	9	.438	11	–	20	.355
Lipscomb	6	–	10	.375	14	–	19	.424
Eastern Kentucky	5	–	11	.313	13	–	18	.419
North Alabama*	2	–	14	.125	9	–	21	.300
† 2022 ASUN tournament winner *Ineligible for the 2022 NCAA tournament due to transition from Division II^Due to Bellarmine's ineligibility, the regular-season champions Jacksonville State took their NCAA tournament berth instead.

The 2021–22 Central Arkansas Bears basketball team represented the University of Central Arkansas (UCA) in the 2021–22 NCAA Division I men's basketball season. The Bears, led by second-year head coach Anthony Boone, played their home games at the on-campus Farris Center in Conway, Arkansas. This was the Bears' first season as members of the West Division of the ASUN Conference.

The Bears finished the season 11–20, 7–9 in ASUN play, to finish in third place in the West Division. In the ASUN tournament, they defeated Stetson in the first round before losing to Jacksonville in the quarterfinals.

== Previous season ==
The Bears finished the 2020–21 season 5–19, 4–12 in Southland Conference play, to finish in twelfth place. They failed to qualify for the Southland Conference tournament. UCA left the Southland Conference in July 2021 to join the ASUN Conference.

== Roster ==
2021–22 Central Arkansas Bears men's basketball team
Players
Coaches

Pos.	#	Name	Height	Weight	Year	Hometown
PF	0	SK Shittu	6 ft 9 in (2.06 m)	225 lb (102 kg)	Sr	Rogers, AR
G/F	1	Ibbe Klintman	6 ft 8 in (2.03 m)	200 lb (91 kg)	Fr	Malmö, Sweden
G	2	Lewis McDaniel	6 ft 3 in (1.91 m)	180 lb (82 kg)	So	Nashville, TN
G/F	4	Darious Hall	6 ft 7 in (2.01 m)	205 lb (93 kg)	Jr	Little Rock, AR
G	5	Masai Olowokere	6 ft 5 in (1.96 m)	195 lb (88 kg)	So	Brooklyn, NY
G	11	Vincent Reeves	6 ft 5 in (1.96 m)	200 lb (91 kg)	Fr	Tuscaloosa, AL
G/F	13	Eddy Kayouloud	6 ft 9 in (2.06 m)	230 lb (104 kg)	Jr	Paris, France
G	14	Collin Cooper	6 ft 2 in (1.88 m)	190 lb (86 kg)	So	Fayetteville, AR
G	20	Brendan Simmons	6 ft 2 in (1.88 m)	195 lb (88 kg)	Fr	El Dorado, AR
C	21	Jonas Munson	7 ft 0 in (2.13 m)	220 lb (100 kg)	RS Fr	Alexandria, VA
G	22	Trey South	6 ft 3 in (1.91 m)	170 lb (77 kg)	Fr	Spring, TX
G	23	Camren Hunter	6 ft 3 in (1.91 m)	200 lb (91 kg)	Fr	Bryant, AR
F	24	Jared Chatham	6 ft 8 in (2.03 m)	185 lb (84 kg)	Sr	Los Angeles, CA
G/F	25	Elias Cato	6 ft 8 in (2.03 m)	200 lb (91 kg)	Fr	Queensland, Australia
C	32	Churchill Bounds	6 ft 10 in (2.08 m)	260 lb (118 kg)	Fr	Cumberland, MD
G/F	34	Jaxson Baker	6 ft 7 in (2.01 m)	205 lb (93 kg)	So	Phoenix, AZ

Head coach

- Anthony Boone (Mississippi)

Assistant coach(es)

- Jeff Price (Marshall)
- Brock Widders (Lyon)
- John Cranford (Liberty)

Legend

- (C) Team captain
- (S) Suspended
- (I) Ineligible
- (W) Walk-on
- Injured
- Current redshirt

Roster
Last update: January 16, 2022

== Schedule and results ==
Date time, TV	Rank^{#}	Opponent^{#}	Result	Record	Site (attendance) city, state
Non-conference regular season
November 9, 2021*; 7:00 p.m., ESPN+		at Saint Louis	L 61–96	0–1	Chaifetz Arena (4,805); St. Louis, MO
November 12, 2021*; 5:30 p.m., FS2		at Butler	L 53–85	0–2	Hinkle Fieldhouse (7,390); Indianapolis, IN
November 17, 2021*; 7:00 p.m., ESPN+		at Baylor	L 47–92	0–3	Ferrell Center (6,667); Waco, TX
November 20, 2021*; 3:15 p.m.		Oral Roberts	W 70–67	1–3	Farris Center (685); Conway, AR
November 24, 2021*; 1:00 p.m., ESPN+		at New Orleans; University of New Orleans Classic	L 63–90	1–4	Lakefront Arena (994); New Orleans, LA
November 25, 2021*; 3:00 p.m.		vs. VMI; University of New Orleans Classic	L 67–73	1–5	Lakefront Arena (347); New Orleans, LA
November 26, 2021*; 3:00 p.m.		vs. Presbyterian; University of New Orleans Classic	L 66–75	1–6	Lakefront Arena (307); New Orleans, LA
December 1, 2021*; 7:00 p.m., SEC+		at Arkansas	L 60–97	1–7	Bud Walton Arena (19,200); Fayetteville, AR
December 4, 2021*; 4:00 p.m., ESPN+		at Arkansas State	L 82–95	1–8	First National Bank Arena (951); Jonesboro, AR
December 14, 2021*; 7:00 p.m.		Little Rock	Postponed due to COVID-19 issues		Farris Center; Conway, AR
December 18, 2021*; 7:00 p.m., ESPN3		at Missouri State	L 70–106	1–9	JQH Arena (2,561); Springfield, MO
December 20, 2021*; 12:00 p.m.		Hendrix College	W 90–56	2–9	Farris Center (512); Conway, AR
December 29, 2021*; 7:00 p.m., SEC+		at Texas A&M	L 59–85	2–10	Reed Arena (7,674); College Station, TX
December 31, 2021*; 12:00 p.m.		Champion Christian	W 119–47	3–10	Farris Center (279); Conway, AR
ASUN Conference regular season
January 4, 2022; 6:00 p.m., ESPN+		at Eastern Kentucky	W 79–72	4–10 (1–0)	Alumni Coliseum (1,478); Richmond, KY
January 9, 2022; 3:15 p.m., ESPN+		Lipscomb	W 93–88	5–10 (2–0)	Farris Center (539); Conway, AR
January 11, 2022; 6:00 p.m., ESPN+		at Bellarmine	L 63–85	5–11 (2–1)	Freedom Hall (1,571); Louisville, KY
January 15, 2022; 3:15 p.m., ESPN+		North Alabama	W 89–88 ^{OT}	6–11 (3–1)	Farris Center (912); Conway, AR
January 18, 2022; 7:00 p.m., ESPN+		Jacksonville State	L 81–86	6–12 (3–2)	Farris Center (1,945); Conway, AR
January 27, 2022; 6:00 p.m., ESPN+		at North Florida	L 74–93	6–13 (3–3)	UNF Arena (1,447); Jacksonville, FL
January 29, 2022; 5:00 p.m., ESPN+		at Jacksonville	L 59–79	6–14 (3–4)	Swisher Gymnasium (938); Jacksonville, FL
February 3, 2022; 7:45 p.m., ESPN+		Florida Gulf Coast	L 93–95 ^{OT}	6–15 (3–5)	Farris Center (1,085); Conway, AR
February 5, 2022; 3:15 p.m., ESPN+		Stetson	W 79–75	7–15 (4–5)	Farris Center (1,874); Conway, AR
February 9, 2022; 6:30 p.m., ESPN+		at Kennesaw State	L 72–83	7–16 (4–6)	KSU Convocation Center (1,190); Kennesaw, GA
February 12, 2022; 4:00 p.m., ESPN+		at Jacksonville State	W 72–62	8–16 (5–6)	Pete Mathews Coliseum (2,856); Jacksonville, AL
February 16, 2022; 7:00 p.m., ESPN+		Bellarmine	L 69–79	8–17 (5–7)	Farris Center (1,918); Conway, AR
February 19, 2022; 3:15 p.m., ESPN+		Eastern Kentucky	W 83–76	9–17 (6–7)	Farris Center (1,683); Conway, AR
February 21, 2022; 7:00 p.m., ESPN+		Liberty; Rescheduled from January 22	L 66–85	9–18 (6–8)	Farris Center (2,145); Conway, AR
February 23, 2022; 7:00 p.m., ESPN+		at North Alabama	W 81–72	10–18 (7–8)	Flowers Hall (724); Florence, AL
February 26, 2022; 1:00 p.m., ESPN+		at Lipscomb	L 66–81	10–19 (7–9)	Allen Arena (0); Nashville, TN
ASUN tournament
March 1, 2022; 6:00 p.m., ESPN+	(W3)	(E6) Stetson; First round	W 74–73	11–19	Farris Center (2,055); Conway, AR
March 3, 2022; 6:00 p.m., ESPN+	(W3)	at (E2) Jacksonville; Quarterfinals	L 69–79	11–20	Swisher Gymnasium (1,033); Jacksonville, FL
*Non-conference game. ^{#}Rankings from AP poll. (#) Tournament seedings in parentheses. All times are in Central.
