= 2021–22 Jacksonville Dolphins men's basketball team =

American college basketball season

2021–22 Jacksonville Dolphins men's basketball
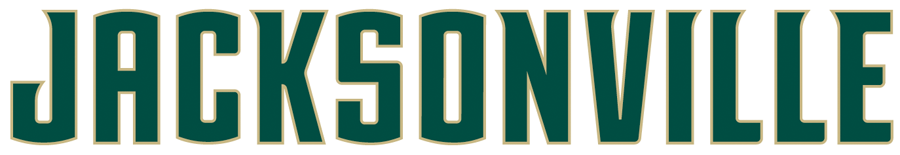
- Conference: ASUN Conference
- East Division
- Record: 21–10 (11–5 ASUN)
- Head coach: Jordan Mincy (1st season)
- Assistant coaches: Trevor Deloach; Scott Cherry; Vince Martin
- Home arena: Swisher Gymnasium

2021–22 ASUN men's basketball standings
	Conf.				Overall
Team	W		L	PCT	W		L	PCT
East
Liberty	12	–	4	.750	22	–	11	.667
Jacksonville	11	–	5	.688	21	–	10	.677
Florida Gulf Coast	10	–	6	.625	22	–	12	.647
Kennesaw State	7	–	9	.438	13	–	18	.419
North Florida	7	–	9	.438	11	–	20	.355
Stetson	5	–	11	.313	11	–	19	.367
West
Jacksonville State^	13	–	3	.813	21	–	11	.656
Bellarmine* †	11	–	5	.688	20	–	13	.606
Central Arkansas	7	–	9	.438	11	–	20	.355
Lipscomb	6	–	10	.375	14	–	19	.424
Eastern Kentucky	5	–	11	.313	13	–	18	.419
North Alabama*	2	–	14	.125	9	–	21	.300
† 2022 ASUN tournament winner *Ineligible for the 2022 NCAA tournament due to transition from Division II^Due to Bellarmine's ineligibility, the regular-season champions Jacksonville State took their NCAA tournament berth instead.

The 2021–22 Jacksonville Dolphins men's basketball team represented Jacksonville University in the 2021–22 NCAA Division I men's basketball season. The Dolphins, led by 1st-year head coach Jordan Mincy, played their home games at Swisher Gymnasium on the university's Jacksonville, Florida campus as members of the East Division of the ASUN Conference.

== Previous season ==
In a season limited due to the ongoing COVID-19 pandemic, the Dolphins finished the 2020–21 season 11–13, 5–9 in ASUN play to finish in eighth place. They did not compete in the ASUN tournament due to COVID-19 protocols.

== Roster ==
2021–22 Jacksonville Dolphins men's basketball team
Players
Coaches

Pos.	#	Name	Height	Weight	Year	Previous school	Hometown
F	0	Rod Brown	6 ft 8 in (2.03 m)	218 lb (99 kg)	RS Jr	New Mexico	Memphis, TN
G	1	Tommy Bruner	6 ft 1 in (1.85 m)	180 lb (82 kg)	RS So	USC Upstate	Columbia, SC
F	2	Isaiah Broady	6 ft 7 in (2.01 m)	175 lb (79 kg)	Fr	Compass Prep	Chandler, AZ
G	3	Kevion Nolan	6 ft 2 in (1.88 m)	170 lb (77 kg)	RS Jr	Samford	Anniston, AL
F	5	Bryce Workman	6 ft 7 in (2.01 m)	230 lb (104 kg)	RS Jr	Sickles HS	Tampa, FL
G	10	Gyasi Powell	6 ft 2 in (1.88 m)	185 lb (84 kg)	RS Fr	Davis & Elkins College	Jacksonville, FL
G	11	Jordan Davis	6 ft 2 in (1.88 m)	195 lb (88 kg)	GS	Middle Tennessee	Irmo, SC
F	12	Mike Marsh	6 ft 10 in (2.08 m)	250 lb (113 kg)	RS So	Dodge City CC	Columbia, SC
F	13	Matthew Lentz	6 ft 7 in (2.01 m)	215 lb (98 kg)	Fr	Durant HS	Seffner, FL
G	14	Carson Brown	6 ft 1 in (1.85 m)	180 lb (82 kg)	Fr	South Walton HS	Miramar Beach, FL
F	15	Osayi Osifo	6 ft 8 in (2.03 m)	225 lb (102 kg)	RS Jr	Florida	McKinney, TX
G	23	Tyreese Davis	6 ft 6 in (1.98 m)	210 lb (95 kg)	RS So	Link Prep	Kansas City, MO
G	31	George Pridgett	5 ft 10 in (1.78 m)	153 lb (69 kg)	Fr	Roswell HS	Boston, MA
G	34	Thomas Owen	6 ft 4 in (1.93 m)	185 lb (84 kg)	RS Jr	St. Francis HS	Dunwoody, GA

Head coach

- Jordan Mincy (Kent State)

Assistant coach(es)

- Vince Martin (Jacksonville)
- Trevor Deloach (UNCW)
- Scott Cherry (North Carolina)

Legend

- (C) Team captain
- (S) Suspended
- (I) Ineligible
- (W) Walk-on
- Injured
- Current redshirt

Roster
Last update: January 15, 2022

== Schedule and results ==
Date time, TV	Rank^{#}	Opponent^{#}	Result	Record	Site (attendance) city, state
Non-conference regular season
November 9, 2021*; 7:00 pm, ESPN+		Trinity Baptist	W 79–43	1–0	Swisher Gymnasium (904); Jacksonville, FL
November 13, 2021*; 2:00 pm, ESPN+		North Carolina A&T	W 63–54	2–0	Swisher Gymnasium (1,015); Jacksonville, FL
November 16, 2021*; 7:00 pm, ESPN+		at UCF	L 54–63	2–1	Addition Financial Arena (3,937); Orlando, FL
November 24, 2021*; 9:00 pm, BTN		at Minnesota	L 44–55	2–2	Williams Arena (9,250); Minneapolis, MN
November 27, 2021*; 6:00 pm, ESPN+		Coastal Georgia	W 83–54	3–2	Swisher Gymnasium (752); Jacksonville, FL
December 2, 2021*; 8:00 pm, ESPN+		at Charleston Southern	W 67–56	4–2	Buccaneer Field House (668); North Charleston, SC
December 7, 2021*; 7:00 pm, SECN+		at Georgia	L 58–69	4–3	Stegeman Coliseum (6,017); Athens, GA
December 11, 2021*; 3:00 pm, ESPN+		UNCW	W 77–48	5–3	Swisher Gymnasium (unknown); Jacksonville, FL
December 14, 2021*; 8:00 pm, CUSA.tv		at Southern Miss	W 62–51	6–3	Reed Green Coliseum (3,057); Hattiesburg, MS
December 18, 2021*; 4:00 pm, ESPN+		Webber International	W 87–48	7–3	Swisher Gymnasium (402); Jacksonville, FL
December 21, 2021*; 2:00 pm, ACCN		at Pittsburgh	L 55–64	7–4	Petersen Events Center (7,392); Pittsburgh, PA
December 29, 2021*; 4:00 pm, ESPN+		Carver	W 98–45	8–4	Swisher Gymnasium (402); Jacksonville, FL
January 2, 2022*; 2:00 pm		at Campbell	Canceled due to COVID-19 issues		Gore Arena; Buies Creek, NC
ASUN Conference regular season
January 8, 2022; 6:00 pm, ESPN+		Florida Gulf Coast	W 69–66	9–4 (1–0)	Swisher Gymnasium (1,024); Jacksonville, FL
January 11, 2022; 7:00 pm, ESPN+		Stetson	W 57–50	10–4 (2–0)	Swisher Gymnasium (987); Jacksonville, FL
January 15, 2022; 5:00 pm, ESPN+		at North Florida	W 54–51	11–4 (3–0)	UNF Arena (2,781); Jacksonville, FL
January 18, 2022; 7:00 pm, ESPN+		at Liberty	L 49–88	11–5 (3–1)	Liberty Arena (2,823); Lynchburg, VA
January 22, 2022; 7:00 pm, ESPN+		at Bellarmine	L 73–76	11–6 (3–2)	Freedom Hall (1,839); Louisville, KY
January 24, 2022; 5:00 pm, ESPN+		at Kennesaw State; Rescheduled from January 5	L 68–76	11–7 (3–3)	KSU Convocation Center (843); Kennesaw, GA
January 27, 2022; 7:00 pm, ESPN+		Lipscomb	W 66–59	12–7 (4–3)	Swisher Gymnasium (1,024); Jacksonville, FL
January 29, 2022; 6:00 pm, ESPN+		Central Arkansas	W 79–59	13–7 (5–3)	Swisher Gymnasium (938); Jacksonville, FL
February 3, 2022; 9:00 pm, ESPN+		at North Alabama	W 56–50	14–7 (6–3)	Flowers Hall (719); Florence, AL
February 5, 2022; 5:00 pm, ESPN+		at Jacksonville State	L 58–64	14–8 (6–4)	Pete Mathews Coliseum (2,978); Jacksonville, AL
February 9, 2022; 7:00 pm, ESPN+		Eastern Kentucky	W 81–68	15–8 (7–4)	Swisher Gymnasium (876); Jacksonville, FL
February 12, 2022; 6:00 pm, ESPN+		Liberty	W 73–69	16–8 (8–4)	Swisher Gymnasium (1,121); Jacksonville, FL
February 16, 2022; 7:00 pm, ESPN+		at Stetson	W 67–45	17–8 (9–4)	Edmunds Center (622); DeLand, FL
February 19, 2022; 6:00 pm, ESPN+		Kennesaw State	W 59–56	18–8 (10–4)	Swisher Gymnasium (986); Jacksonville, FL
February 23, 2022; 7:00 pm, ESPN+		North Florida	W 71–39	19–8 (11–4)	Swisher Gymnasium (1,489); Jacksonville, FL
February 26, 2022; 1:00 pm, ESPN+		at Florida Gulf Coast	L 69–76	19–9 (11–5)	Alico Arena (2,589); Fort Myers, FL
ASUN tournament
March 3, 2022; 7:00 pm, ESPN+	(E2)	(W3) Central Arkansas; Quarterfinals	W 79–69	20–9	Swisher Gymnasium (1,033); Jacksonville, FL
March 5, 2022; 7:00 pm, ESPN+	(E2)	at (W1) Jacksonville State; Semifinals	W 54–51	21–9	Pete Mathews Coliseum (2,950); Jacksonville, AL
March 8, 2022; 5:00 pm, ESPN2	(E2)	at (W2) Bellarmine; Championship	L 72–77	21–10	Freedom Hall (6,251); Louisville, KY
*Non-conference game. ^{#}Rankings from AP Poll. (#) Tournament seedings in parentheses. All times are in Eastern.
