= 2021–22 Liberty Flames basketball team =

American college basketball season

2021–22 Liberty Flames basketball

Atlantic Sun East Division champions
- Conference: ASUN Conference
- East Division
- Record: 22–11 (12–4 ASUN)
- Head coach: Ritchie McKay (7th (9th overall) season)
- Assistant coaches: Brad Soucie (7th (9th) season); Derek Johnston (4th season); Joe Pierre III (2nd season)
- Home arena: Liberty Arena

2021–22 ASUN men's basketball standings
	Conf.				Overall
Team	W		L	PCT	W		L	PCT
East
Liberty	12	–	4	.750	22	–	11	.667
Jacksonville	11	–	5	.688	21	–	10	.677
Florida Gulf Coast	10	–	6	.625	22	–	12	.647
Kennesaw State	7	–	9	.438	13	–	18	.419
North Florida	7	–	9	.438	11	–	20	.355
Stetson	5	–	11	.313	11	–	19	.367
West
Jacksonville State^	13	–	3	.813	21	–	11	.656
Bellarmine* †	11	–	5	.688	20	–	13	.606
Central Arkansas	7	–	9	.438	11	–	20	.355
Lipscomb	6	–	10	.375	14	–	19	.424
Eastern Kentucky	5	–	11	.313	13	–	18	.419
North Alabama*	2	–	14	.125	9	–	21	.300
† 2022 ASUN tournament winner *Ineligible for the 2022 NCAA tournament due to transition from Division II^Due to Bellarmine's ineligibility, the regular-season champions Jacksonville State took their NCAA tournament berth instead.

The 2021–22 Liberty Flames men's basketball team represented Liberty University in the 2021–22 NCAA Division I men's basketball season. The team played its home games in Lynchburg, Virginia at Liberty Arena. The team were led by Ritchie McKay, who was in the seventh season of his current stint as head coach and ninth overall. Liberty competed as a member of the East Division of the ASUN Conference.

The Flames finished the season 22–11, 12–4 in ASUN play, to finish in first place in the East Division. They defeated Lipscomb in the quarterfinals of the ASUN tournament before falling to Bellarmine in the semifinals.

== Previous season ==
In a season limited due to the ongoing COVID-19 pandemic, the Flames finished the 2020–21 season 23–6, 11–2 in ASUN play, to finish in first place in the ASUN. They defeated Kennesaw State, Stetson and North Alabama to win the ASUN tournament. As a result, they received the conference's automatic bid to the NCAA tournament as the No. 13 seed in the Midwest region. They lost in the first round to Oklahoma State.

== Roster ==
2021–22 Liberty Flames men's basketball team
Players
Coaches

Pos.	#	Name	Height	Weight	Year	Previous school	Hometown
G	1	Brody Peebles	6 ft 2 in (1.88 m)	—	Fr	Hartselle HS	Hartselle, AL
G	2	Darius McGhee	5 ft 9 in (1.75 m)	—	Sr	Blue Ridge School	Roxboro, NC
G	3	Isiah Warfield	6 ft 5 in (1.96 m)	—	So	Central Valley HS	Monaca, PA
G	4	Stephen Burggraf	6 ft 0 in (1.83 m)	160 lb (73 kg)	Jr	Liberty Christian Academy	Lynchburg, VA
F	5	Bryson Spell	6 ft 9 in (2.06 m)	—	Fr	Cape Henry Collegiate School	Virginia Beach, VA
G	11	Jonathan Jackson	6 ft 4 in (1.93 m)	—	So	Blue Valley HS	Dallas, TX
G	13	DJ Moore	6 ft 3 in (1.91 m)	—	Fr	Worthington Christian HS	Worthington, OH
G/F	20	Keegan McDowell	6 ft 6 in (1.98 m)	180 lb (82 kg)	RS Sr	Moeller HS	Cincinnati, OH
G	21	Gabriel McKay	6 ft 2 in (1.88 m)	—	Jr	Trevecca Nazarene	Lynchburg, VA
F	22	Kyle Rode	6 ft 7 in (2.01 m)	—	Jr	Lexington Christian Academy	Lexington, KY
G	23	Joseph Venzant	6 ft 3 in (1.91 m)	—	Fr	Midland HS	Midland, TX
F	24	Micaiah Abii	6 ft 7 in (2.01 m)	—	So	Liberty HS	Frisco, TX
F	32	Blake Preston	6 ft 9 in (2.06 m)	—	RS Jr	Charlotte Christian School	Charlotte, NC
F	33	Shiloh Robinson	6 ft 7 in (2.01 m)	—	Jr	Kearney HS	Kearney, NE

Head coach

- Ritchie McKay (Seattle Pacific)

Assistant coach(es)

- Brad Soucie (Christian Heritage (CA))
- Derek Johnston (Alabama–Huntsville)
- Joe Pierre III (Oklahoma State)

Legend

- (C) Team captain
- (S) Suspended
- (I) Ineligible
- (W) Walk-on
- Injured
- Current redshirt

Roster
Last update: October 26, 2025

== Schedule and results ==
Date time, TV	Rank^{#}	Opponent^{#}	Result	Record	Site (attendance) city, state
Non-conference regular season
November 11, 2021*; 7:00 p.m., ESPN+		Regent	W 85–24	1–0	Liberty Arena (4,034); Lynchburg, VA
November 15, 2021*; 7:00 p.m., ESPNU		at LSU	L 58–74	1–1	Pete Maravich Assembly Center (8,940); Baton Rouge, LA
November 19, 2021*; 5:00 p.m., ESPNU		vs. Iona; MAAC/ASUN Challenge	L 50–54	1–2	HP Field House (367); Kissimmee, FL
November 20, 2021*; 6:00 p.m., ESPN3		vs. Manhattan; MAAC/ASUN Challenge	L 60–76	1–3	HP Field House (432); Kissimmee, FL
November 23, 2021*; 5:00 p.m.		at Bethune–Cookman	W 59–51	2–3	Ocean Center (150); Daytona Beach, FL
November 27, 2021*; 5:00 p.m.		Maryland Eastern Shore	W 73–61	3–3	Liberty Arena (3,000); Lynchburg, VA
December 2, 2021*; 7:00 p.m., ESPN+		Missouri	W 66–45	4–3	Liberty Arena (4,005); Lynchburg, VA
December 5, 2021*; 7:00 p.m., ESPN+		Delaware State	W 96–60	5–3	Liberty Arena (2,634); Lynchburg, VA
December 11, 2021*; 7:00 p.m., FloSports		vs. Stephen F. Austin; Hall of Fame Classic	L 51–63	5–4	Dickies Arena (2,848); Fort Worth, TX
December 13, 2021*; 7:00 p.m., ESPN+		Carver College	W 95–36	6–4	Liberty Arena (2,188); Lynchburg, VA
December 17, 2021*; 1:30 p.m., ESPN+		vs. East Carolina; Basketball Hall of Fame Shootout	W 74–64	7–4	Spectrum Center (0); Charlotte, NC
December 22, 2021*; 4:00 p.m., ESPNU		vs. Northern Iowa; Diamond Head Classic quarterfinals	W 76–74	8–4	Stan Sheriff Center (0); Honolulu, HI
December 23, 2021*; 4:00 p.m., ESPN2		vs. Stanford; Diamond Head Classic semifinals	L 76–79	8–5	Stan Sheriff Center (0); Honolulu, HI
December 25, 2021*; 6:30 p.m., ESPN2		vs. BYU; Diamond Head Classic	L 75–80	8–6	Stan Sheriff Center (4,425); Honolulu, HI
December 31, 2021*; 1:00 p.m., ESPN+		Boyce College	W 91–60	9–6	Liberty Arena (2,552); Lynchburg, VA
ASUN Conference regular season
January 4, 2022; 7:00 p.m., ESPN+		at Stetson	W 75–59	10–6 (1–0)	Edmunds Center (483); DeLand, FL
January 11, 2022; 7:00 p.m., ESPN+		North Florida	W 71–56	11–6 (2–0)	Liberty Arena (3,315); Lynchburg, VA
January 15, 2022; 7:00 p.m., ESPN+		at Florida Gulf Coast	W 78–75	12–6 (3–0)	Alico Arena (2,358); Fort Myers, FL
January 18, 2022; 7:00 p.m., ESPN+		at Jacksonville	W 88–49	13–6 (4–0)	Liberty Arena (2,823); Lynchburg, VA
January 27, 2022; 7:00 p.m., ESPN+		North Alabama	W 72–53	14–6 (5–0)	Liberty Arena (2,860); Lynchburg, VA
January 29, 2022; 7:00 p.m., ESPN+		Jacksonville State	L 67–77	14–7 (5–1)	Liberty Arena (3,272); Lynchburg, VA
January 31, 2022; 7:00 p.m., ESPN+		at Kennesaw State; Rescheduled from January 20	W 65–50	15–7 (6–1)	KSU Convocation Center (835); Kennesaw, GA
February 3, 2022; 7:00 p.m., ESPN+		at Bellarmine	W 66–53	16–7 (7–1)	Freedom Hall (743); Louisville, KY
February 5, 2022; 7:00 p.m., ESPN+		at Eastern Kentucky	W 91–84	17–7 (8–1)	Alumni Coliseum (4,017); Richmond, KY
February 8, 2022; 7:00 p.m., ESPN+		Lipscomb	W 78–69	18–7 (9–1)	Liberty Arena (3,075); Lynchburg, VA
February 12, 2022; 6:00 p.m., ESPN+		at Jacksonville	L 69–73	18–8 (9–2)	Swisher Gymnasium (1,121); Jacksonville, FL
February 15, 2022; 7:00 p.m., ESPN+		at North Florida	L 69–72	18–9 (9–3)	UNF Arena (1,569); Jacksonville, FL
February 19, 2022; 7:00 p.m., ESPN+		Stetson	W 88–82	19–9 (10–3)	Liberty Arena (3,646); Lynchburg, VA
February 21, 2022; 8:00 p.m., ESPN+		at Central Arkansas; Rescheduled from January 22	W 85–66	20–9 (11–3)	Farris Center (2,145); Conway, AR
February 23, 2022; 7:00 p.m., ESPN+		Florida Gulf Coast	L 72–82 ^{OT}	20–10 (11–4)	Liberty Arena (3,583); Lynchburg, VA
February 26, 2022; 1:00 p.m., ESPN+		Kennesaw State; Rescheduled from January 8	W 100–93 ^{OT}	21–10 (12–4)	Liberty Arena (3,112); Lynchburg, VA
ASUN tournament
March 3, 2022; 7:00 p.m., ESPN+	(E1)	(W4) Lipscomb; Quarterfinals	W 52–47	22–10	Liberty Arena (2,486); Lynchburg, VA
March 5, 2022; 6:00 p.m., ESPN+	(E1)	(W2) Bellarmine; Semifinals	L 50–53	22–11	Liberty Arena (3,515); Lynchburg, VA
*Non-conference game. ^{#}Rankings from AP poll. (#) Tournament seedings in parentheses. All times are in Eastern.
