= 2021–22 Eastern Kentucky Colonels men's basketball team =

American college basketball season

2021–22 Eastern Kentucky Colonels men's basketball
- Conference: ASUN Conference
- West Division
- Record: 13–18 (5–11 ASUN)
- Head coach: A. W. Hamilton (4th season)
- Assistant coaches: Steve Lepore; Mike Allen; Patrick Blake
- Home arena: McBrayer Arena

2021–22 ASUN men's basketball standings
	Conf.				Overall
Team	W		L	PCT	W		L	PCT
East
Liberty	12	–	4	.750	22	–	11	.667
Jacksonville	11	–	5	.688	21	–	10	.677
Florida Gulf Coast	10	–	6	.625	22	–	12	.647
Kennesaw State	7	–	9	.438	13	–	18	.419
North Florida	7	–	9	.438	11	–	20	.355
Stetson	5	–	11	.313	11	–	19	.367
West
Jacksonville State^	13	–	3	.813	21	–	11	.656
Bellarmine* †	11	–	5	.688	20	–	13	.606
Central Arkansas	7	–	9	.438	11	–	20	.355
Lipscomb	6	–	10	.375	14	–	19	.424
Eastern Kentucky	5	–	11	.313	13	–	18	.419
North Alabama*	2	–	14	.125	9	–	21	.300
† 2022 ASUN tournament winner *Ineligible for the 2022 NCAA tournament due to transition from Division II^Due to Bellarmine's ineligibility, the regular-season champions Jacksonville State took their NCAA tournament berth instead.

The 2021–22 Eastern Kentucky Colonels men's basketball team represented Eastern Kentucky University in the 2021–22 NCAA Division I men's basketball season. The Colonels, led by fourth-year head coach A. W. Hamilton, played their home games at McBrayer Arena within Alumni Coliseum as members of the West Division of the ASUN Conference.

== Previous season ==
In a season limited due to the ongoing COVID-19 pandemic, the Colonels finished the 2020–21 season 22–7, 15–5 in OVC play to finish in third place. They lost to Morehead State in the semifinals of the OVC tournament in their 73rd and final season as members of the Ohio Valley Conference. EKU joined the ASUN Conference on July 1, 2021.

== Roster ==
2021–22 Eastern Kentucky Colonels men's basketball team
Players
Coaches

Pos.	#	Name	Height	Weight	Year	Hometown
G	0	Russhard Cruickshank	6 ft 0 in (1.83 m)	172 lb (78 kg)	Sr	Milwaukee, Wisconsin
G	1	Trevin Wade	5 ft 11 in (1.8 m)	166 lb (75 kg)	Jr	Marietta, Georgia
F	2	Iran Bennett	6 ft 10 in (2.08 m)	322 lb (146 kg)	RS Jr	Charlotte, North Carolina
F	3	Jannson Williams	6 ft 9 in (2.06 m)	221 lb (100 kg)	RS Sr	Newnan, Georgia
G	4	Curt Lewis	6 ft 5 in (1.96 m)	222 lb (101 kg)	RS Fr	Louisville, Kentucky
G	5	Cooper Robb	6 ft 1 in (1.85 m)	184 lb (83 kg)	Jr	Georgetown, Kentucky
G	10	Braxton Beverly	5 ft 10 in (1.78 m)	185 lb (84 kg)	Sr	Vicco, Kentucky
G	11	Jomaru Brown	6 ft 2 in (1.88 m)	186 lb (84 kg)	Jr	Raleigh, North Carolina
F	12	Michael Wardy	6 ft 7 in (2.01 m)	203 lb (92 kg)	Jr	Lincoln, Nebraska
F	13	Tariq Balogun	6 ft 10 in (2.08 m)	237 lb (108 kg)	So	London, England
G/F	14	Devontae Blanton	6 ft 6 in (1.98 m)	214 lb (97 kg)	Fr	Macedonia, Ohio
G	15	Isaiah Minter	5 ft 11 in (1.8 m)	175 lb (79 kg)	RS So	Richmond, Kentucky
G	20	Wade Pelfrey	5 ft 11 in (1.8 m)	167 lb (76 kg)	Fr	Hazard, Kentucky
G	23	DaShawn Jackson	6 ft 3 in (1.91 m)	196 lb (89 kg)	Fr	Lexington, Kentucky
F	24	Michael Moreno	6 ft 7 in (2.01 m)	225 lb (102 kg)	So	Georgetown, Kentucky
G	30	Jordan Reeves-Young	6 ft 3 in (1.91 m)	170 lb (77 kg)	RS Fr	Brooklyn, New York

Head coach

- A. W. Hamilton (Marshall)

Assistant coach(es)

- Steve Lepore (Wake Forest)
- Mike Allen (Ohio)
- Patrick Blake (Louisville)

Legend

- (C) Team captain
- (S) Suspended
- (I) Ineligible
- (W) Walk-on
- Injured
- Current redshirt

Roster
Last update: January 16, 2022

== Schedule and results ==
Date time, TV	Rank^{#}	Opponent^{#}	Result	Record	Site (attendance) city, state
Non-conference regular season
November 9, 2021*; 7:00 pm, ESPN+		Georgetown (KY)	W 93–63	1–0	McBrayer Arena (3,581); Richmond, KY
November 11, 2021*; 8:00 pm, ESPN+		Ohio Valley	W 103–74	2–0	McBrayer Arena (2,237); Richmond, KY
November 13, 2021*; 7:00 pm, ESPN+		at Milwaukee	W 77–71	3–0	UW–Milwaukee Panther Arena (4,318); Milwaukee, WI
November 16, 2021*; 7:00 pm, ESPN+		James Madison	L 78–79	3–1	McBrayer Arena (3,791); Richmond, KY
November 20, 2021*; 7:30 pm, ESPN+		Albany	W 77–64	4–1	McBrayer Arena (2,251); Richmond, KY
November 22, 2021*; 7:00 pm, ESPN+		Eastern Illinois	W 82–43	5–1	McBrayer Arena (2,196); Richmond, KY
November 26, 2021*; 7:00 pm, ESPN+		at West Virginia	L 77–80	5–2	WVU Coliseum (10,062); Morgantown, WV
November 28, 2021*; 4:30 pm, ESPN+		at Radford	L 75–88	5–3	Dedmon Center (1,500); Radford, VA
December 4, 2021*; 7:00 pm, ESPN+		at Western Kentucky	L 80–85	5–4	E. A. Diddle Arena (4,249); Bowling Green, KY
December 7, 2021*; 10:00 pm, P12N		at No. 16 USC	L 68–80	5–5	Galen Center (2,608); Los Angeles, CA
December 11, 2021*; 7:00 pm, ESPN+		Marshall	L 69–80	5–6	McBrayer Arena (4,071); Richmond, KY
December 15, 2021*; 7:00 pm, ESPN+		Midway	W 121–67	6–6	McBrayer Arena (1,636); Richmond, KY
December 18, 2021*; 7:00 pm, ESPN+		Northern Kentucky	W 81-68 ^{OT}	7–6	McBrayer Arena (3,057); Richmond, KY
December 22, 2021*; 11:00 am		at Bryant	Canceled due to COVID-19 protocols		Chace Athletic Center; Smithfield, RI
December 31, 2021*; 3:00 pm, ESPN+		Alice Lloyd	W 106–52	8–6	McBrayer Arena (2,061); Richmond, KY
ASUN Conference regular season
January 4, 2022; 7:00 pm, ESPN+		Central Arkansas	L 72–79	8–7 (0–1)	McBrayer Arena (1,478); Richmond, KY
January 8, 2022; 7:00 pm, ESPN+		at Bellarmine	L 61–66	8–8 (0–2)	Freedom Hall (2,782); Louisville, KY
January 11, 2022; 7:00 pm, ESPN+		at North Alabama	L 75–76	8–9 (0–3)	Flowers Hall (896); Florence, AL
January 15, 2022; 7:00 pm, ESPN+		Jacksonville State	L 65–76	8–10 (0–4)	McBrayer Arena (2,479); Richmond, KY
January 18, 2022; 7:00 pm, ESPN+		Lipscomb	W 86–72	9–10 (1–4)	McBrayer Arena (2,593); Richmond, KY
January 22, 2022; 7:00 pm, ESPN+		North Florida	W 67–58	10–10 (2–4)	McBrayer Arena (2,527); Richmond, KY
January 27, 2022; 5:00 pm, ESPN+		at Florida Gulf Coast	L 73–77	10–11 (2–5)	Alico Arena (2,234); Fort Myers, FL
January 29, 2022; 4:00 pm, ESPN+		at Stetson	L 95–113	10–12 (2–6)	Edmunds Center (0); DeLand, FL
February 3, 2022; 7:30 pm, ESPN+		Kennesaw State	W 82–81 ^{3OT}	11–12 (3–6)	McBrayer Arena (2,397); Richmond, KY
February 5, 2022; 7:00 pm, ESPN+		Liberty	L 84–91	11–13 (3–7)	McBrayer Arena (4,017); Richmond, KY
February 9, 2022; 7:00 pm, ESPN+		at Jacksonville	L 68–81	11–14 (3–8)	Swisher Gymnasium (876); Jacksonville, FL
February 12, 2022; 5:00 pm, ESPN+		at Lipscomb	L 73–83	11–15 (3–9)	Allen Arena (1,344); Nashville, TN
February 16, 2022; 7:30 pm, ESPN+		North Alabama	W 80–76 ^{OT}	12–15 (4–9)	McBrayer Arena (2,177); Richmond, KY
February 19, 2022; 4:15 pm, ESPN+		at Central Arkansas	L 76–83	12–16 (4–10)	Farris Center (1,683); Conway, AR
February 23, 2022; 7:00 pm, ESPN+		at Jacksonville State	L 68–81	12–17 (4–11)	Pete Mathews Coliseum (2,433); Jacksonville, AL
February 26, 2022; 1:00 pm, ESPN+		Bellarmine	W 72–58	13–17 (5–11)	McBrayer Arena (4,911); Richmond, KY
ASUN tournament
March 1, 2022; 6:00 pm, ESPN+	(W5)	at (E4) Kennesaw State; First round	L 73–82	13–18	KSU Convocation Center (1,194); Kennesaw, GA
*Non-conference game. ^{#}Rankings from AP Poll. (#) Tournament seedings in parentheses. All times are in Eastern.
