= 2021–22 Kennesaw State Owls men's basketball team =

American college basketball season

2021–22 Kennesaw State Owls men's basketball
- Conference: ASUN Conference
- East Division
- Record: 13–18 (7–9 ASUN)
- Head coach: Amir Abdur-Rahim (3rd season)
- Associate head coach: Ben Fletcher
- Assistant coaches: Pershin Williams; William Small
- Home arena: KSU Convocation Center

2021–22 ASUN men's basketball standings
	Conf.				Overall
Team	W		L	PCT	W		L	PCT
East
Liberty	12	–	4	.750	22	–	11	.667
Jacksonville	11	–	5	.688	21	–	10	.677
Florida Gulf Coast	10	–	6	.625	22	–	12	.647
Kennesaw State	7	–	9	.438	13	–	18	.419
North Florida	7	–	9	.438	11	–	20	.355
Stetson	5	–	11	.313	11	–	19	.367
West
Jacksonville State^	13	–	3	.813	21	–	11	.656
Bellarmine* †	11	–	5	.688	20	–	13	.606
Central Arkansas	7	–	9	.438	11	–	20	.355
Lipscomb	6	–	10	.375	14	–	19	.424
Eastern Kentucky	5	–	11	.313	13	–	18	.419
North Alabama*	2	–	14	.125	9	–	21	.300
† 2022 ASUN tournament winner *Ineligible for the 2022 NCAA tournament due to transition from Division II^Due to Bellarmine's ineligibility, the regular-season champions Jacksonville State took their NCAA tournament berth instead.

The 2021–22 Kennesaw State Owls men's basketball team represented Kennesaw State University in the 2021–22 NCAA Division I men's basketball season. The Owls, led by third-year head coach Amir Abdur-Rahim, played their home games at the KSU Convocation Center in Kennesaw, Georgia as members of the East Division of the ASUN Conference.

== Previous season ==
In a season limited by the ongoing COVID-19 pandemic, the Owls finished the 2020–21 season 5–19, 2–13 in ASUN play to finish in last place. They lost in the first round of the ASUN tournament to Liberty.

== Roster ==
2021–22 Kennesaw State Owls men's basketball team
Players
Coaches

Pos.	#	Name	Height	Weight	Year	Previous school	Hometown
F	0	Demond Robinson	6 ft 8 in (2.03 m)	264 lb (120 kg)	Jr	Murray State	Montgomery, AL
G	1	Terrell Burden	5 ft 10 in (1.78 m)	170 lb (77 kg)	Jr	Campbell HS	Smyrna, GA
F	2	Nate Springs	6 ft 10 in (2.08 m)	217 lb (98 kg)	RS Jr	Ohio	Charlotte, NC
G	3	Chris Youngblood	6 ft 4 in (1.93 m)	218 lb (99 kg)	So	East Coweta HS	Tuscaloosa, AL
F	4	Cole LaRue	6 ft 9 in (2.06 m)	236 lb (107 kg)	So	McGill–Toolen HS	Mobile, AL
G	5	Brandon Stroud	6 ft 6 in (1.98 m)	200 lb (91 kg)	So	East Coweta HS	Atlanta, GA
F	10	Alex Peterson	6 ft 7 in (2.01 m)	218 lb (99 kg)	Sr	Missouri State–West Plains	Tappahannock, VA
G	12	Jamir Moultrie	6 ft 1 in (1.85 m)	172 lb (78 kg)	RS Sr	North Carolina Central	Wilmington, DE
G	13	Kasen Jennings	6 ft 3 in (1.91 m)	202 lb (92 kg)	So	Langston Hughes HS	Fairburn, GA
G	14	Isaiah Reddish	6 ft 5 in (1.96 m)	201 lb (91 kg)	Sr	Barton College	Durham, NC
F	15	Mayson Quartlebaum	6 ft 6 in (1.98 m)	240 lb (109 kg)	So	Lawrence HS	Lawrence, KS
F	21	Armani Harris	6 ft 6 in (1.98 m)	204 lb (93 kg)	Jr	Newton HS	Brooklyn, NY
G	22	Spencer Rodgers	6 ft 4 in (1.93 m)	188 lb (85 kg)	Sr	Southwest Mississippi CC	Lawrenceville, GA

Head coach

- Amir Abdur-Rahim (Southeastern Louisiana)

Assistant coach(es)

- Ben Fletcher (Troy)
- William Small (Belhaven)
- Pershin Williams (North Florida)

Legend

- (C) Team captain
- (S) Suspended
- (I) Ineligible
- (W) Walk-on
- Injured
- Current redshirt

Roster
Last update: January 15, 2022

== Schedule and results ==
Date time, TV	Rank^{#}	Opponent^{#}	Result	Record	Site (attendance) city, state
Non-conference regular season
November 9, 2021*; 8:00 pm, ESPN+		at Iowa State	L 73–84	0–1	Hilton Coliseum (12,180); Ames, IA
November 11, 2021*; 8:30 pm, FS1		at Creighton	L 44–51	0–2	CHI Health Center Omaha (16,092); Omaha, NE
November 14, 2021*; 4:00 pm, ESPN+		Piedmont	W 81–57	1–2	KSU Convocation Center (1,028); Kennesaw, GA
November 15, 2021*; 5:00 pm, ESPN+		Carver	W 117–58	2–2	KSU Convocation Center (764); Kennesaw, GA
November 19, 2021*; 7:00 pm, ESPN+		Belmont	L 78–97	2–3	KSU Convocation Center (1,262); Kennesaw, GA
November 23, 2021*; 8:00 pm, ACCN		at Wake Forest	L 61–92	2–4	LJVM Coliseum (3,554); Winston-Salem, NC
November 28, 2021*; 4:00 pm, ESPN+		Charleston Southern	W 89–52	3–4	KSU Convocation Center (742); Kennesaw, GA
December 1, 2021*; 7:00 pm, ESPN+		Mercer	L 71–73	3–5	KSU Convocation Center (1,518); Kennesaw, GA
December 5, 2021*; 2:00 pm, ESPN+		at Wofford	L 62–88	3–6	Jerry Richardson Indoor Stadium (857); Spartanburg, SC
December 11, 2021*; 4:00 pm, ESPN+		Voorhees	W 80–56	4–6	KSU Convocation Center (936); Kennesaw, GA
December 18, 2021*; 7:00 pm, ESPN+		at Samford	L 84–85	4–7	Pete Hanna Center (713); Homewood, AL
December 22, 2021*; 7:30 pm, ESPNU		at Nebraska	L 74–88	4–8	Pinnacle Bank Arena (14,519); Lincoln, NE
December 30, 2021*; 7:00 pm, ESPN+		Toccoa Falls	W 108–51	5–8	KSU Convocation Center (787); Kennesaw, GA
ASUN Conference regular season
January 13, 2022; 7:00 pm, ESPN+		Florida Gulf Coast	W 77–53	6–8 (1–0)	KSU Convocation Center (628); Kennesaw, GA
January 15, 2022; 4:00 pm, ESPN+		at Stetson	W 77–49	7–8 (2–0)	Edmunds Center (464); DeLand, FL
January 17, 2022; 7:00 pm, ESPN+		at North Florida	W 62–60	8–8 (3–0)	UNF Arena (1,357); Jacksonville, FL
January 22, 2022; 5:00 pm, ESPN+		at Lipscomb	L 73–77	8–9 (3–1)	Allen Arena (0); Nashville, TN
January 24, 2022; 5:00 pm, ESPN+		Jacksonville; Rescheduled from January 5	W 76–68	9–9 (4–1)	KSU Convocation Center (843); Kennesaw, GA
January 27, 2022; 7:30 pm, ESPN+		Jacksonville State	L 64–70	9–10 (4–2)	KSU Convocation Center (1,531); Kennesaw, GA
January 29, 2022; 5:30 pm, ESPN+		North Alabama	L 58–71	9–11 (4–3)	KSU Convocation Center (1,194); Kennesaw, GA
January 31, 2022; 7:00 pm, ESPN+		Liberty; Rescheduled from January 20	L 50–65	9–12 (4–4)	KSU Convocation Center (835); Kennesaw, GA
February 3, 2022; 7:30 pm, ESPN+		at Eastern Kentucky	L 81–82 ^{3OT}	9–13 (4–5)	Alumni Coliseum (2,397); Richmond, KY
February 5, 2022; 7:00 pm, ESPN+		at Bellarmine	W 75–70	10–13 (5–5)	Freedom Hall (1,564); Louisville, KY
February 9, 2022; 7:30 pm, ESPN+		Central Arkansas	W 83–72	11–13 (6–5)	KSU Convocation Center (1,190); Kennesaw, GA
February 12, 2022; 5:00 pm, ESPN+		North Florida	L 72–74	11–14 (6–6)	KSU Convocation Center (939); Kennesaw, GA
February 16, 2022; 7:00 pm, ESPN+		at Florida Gulf Coast	L 76–82	11–15 (6–7)	Alico Arena (1,857); Fort Myers, FL
February 19, 2022; 6:00 pm, ESPN+		at Jacksonville	L 56–59	11–16 (6–8)	Swisher Gymnasium (986); Jacksonville, FL
February 23, 2022; 7:00 pm, ESPN+		Stetson	W 75–71	12–16 (7–8)	KSU Convocation Center (917); Kennesaw, GA
February 26, 2022; 1:00 pm, ESPN+		at Liberty; Rescheduled from January 8	L 93–100 ^{OT}	12–17 (7–9)	Liberty Arena (3,112); Lynchburg, VA
ASUN tournament
March 1, 2022; 7:00 pm, ESPN+	(E4)	(W5) Eastern Kentucky; First round	W 82–73	13–17	KSU Convocation Center (1,194); Kennesaw, GA
March 3, 2022; 7:00 pm, ESPN+	(E4)	at (W1) Jacksonville State; Quarterfinals	L 67–78	13–18	Pete Mathews Coliseum (2,732); Jacksonville, Alabama
*Non-conference game. ^{#}Rankings from AP Poll. (#) Tournament seedings in parentheses. All times are in Eastern.
