= 2021–22 Lipscomb Bisons men's basketball team =

American college basketball season

2021–22 Lipscomb Bisons men's basketball
- Conference: ASUN Conference
- West Division
- Record: 14–19 (6–10 ASUN)
- Head coach: Lennie Acuff (3rd season)
- Assistant coaches: Kevin Carroll; Roger Idstrom; Tyler Murray
- Home arena: Allen Arena

2021–22 ASUN men's basketball standings
	Conf.				Overall
Team	W		L	PCT	W		L	PCT
East
Liberty	12	–	4	.750	22	–	11	.667
Jacksonville	11	–	5	.688	21	–	10	.677
Florida Gulf Coast	10	–	6	.625	22	–	12	.647
Kennesaw State	7	–	9	.438	13	–	18	.419
North Florida	7	–	9	.438	11	–	20	.355
Stetson	5	–	11	.313	11	–	19	.367
West
Jacksonville State^	13	–	3	.813	21	–	11	.656
Bellarmine* †	11	–	5	.688	20	–	13	.606
Central Arkansas	7	–	9	.438	11	–	20	.355
Lipscomb	6	–	10	.375	14	–	19	.424
Eastern Kentucky	5	–	11	.313	13	–	18	.419
North Alabama*	2	–	14	.125	9	–	21	.300
† 2022 ASUN tournament winner *Ineligible for the 2022 NCAA tournament due to transition from Division II^Due to Bellarmine's ineligibility, the regular-season champions Jacksonville State took their NCAA tournament berth instead.

The 2021–22 Lipscomb Bisons men's basketball team represented Lipscomb University in the 2021–22 NCAA Division I men's basketball season. The Bisons, led by third-year head coach Lennie Acuff, played their home games at the Allen Arena in Nashville, Tennessee as members of the West Division of the ASUN Conference (ASUN).

The Bisons finished the season 14–19, 6–10 in ASUN play, to finish in fourth place in the West Division. In the ASUN tournament, they defeated North Florida in the first round before losing to Liberty in the quarterfinals.

== Previous season ==
The Bisons finished the 2020–21 season 15–12, 9–6 in ASUN play, to finish in third place. In the quarterfinals of the ASUN tournament, the Bisons lost to Florida Gulf Coast.

== Roster ==
2021–22 Lipscomb Bisons men's basketball team
Players
Coaches

Pos.	#	Name	Height	Weight	Year	Previous school	Hometown
G	0	KJ Johnson	6 ft 3 in (1.91 m)	165 lb (75 kg)	So	Marshall County HS	Lewisburg, TN
G	1	Greg Jones	6 ft 3 in (1.91 m)	200 lb (91 kg)	Jr	Wakeland HS	Frisco, TX
G	2	Will Pruitt	6 ft 3 in (1.91 m)	195 lb (88 kg)	Fr	Mt. Juliet HS	Mt. Juliet, TN
G	3	Trae Benham	6 ft 3 in (1.91 m)	205 lb (93 kg)	Fr	Concord Academy	Concord, NC
G	4	Tanner Shulman	6 ft 4 in (1.93 m)	200 lb (91 kg)	Fr	McCallie School	Chattanooga, TN
F	5	Kaleb Coleman	6 ft 7 in (2.01 m)	215 lb (98 kg)	So	Oak Ridge HS	Orlando, FL
G	10	Gray Weaver	6 ft 3 in (1.91 m)	180 lb (82 kg)	Fr	Owensboro Catholic HS	Owensboro, KY
G	11	Quincy Clark	6 ft 2 in (1.88 m)	180 lb (82 kg)	Fr	Westerville Central HS	Westerville, OH
F	13	Parker Hazen	6 ft 8 in (2.03 m)	210 lb (95 kg)	GS	Iowa Western CC	Columbia City, IN
G	14	Tommy Murr	6 ft 1 in (1.85 m)	165 lb (75 kg)	Fr	Lindsey Lane Christian School	Athens, AL
C	23	Ahsan Asadullah	6 ft 9 in (2.06 m)	275 lb (125 kg)	Jr	North Clayton HS	Atlanta, GA
G	24	Jason Montgomery	6 ft 5 in (1.96 m)	200 lb (91 kg)	So	Drury	St. Louis, MO
C	35	Grant Asman	6 ft 10 in (2.08 m)	210 lb (95 kg)	Fr	Kimberly HS	Kimberly, WI
F	41	Jacob Ognacevic	6 ft 7 in (2.01 m)	220 lb (100 kg)	Fr	Valparaiso	Sheboygan, WI

Head coach

- Lennie Acuff (Shorter)

Assistant coach(es)

- Kevin Carroll (Berry)
- Roger Idstrom (Mars Hill)
- Tyler Murray (Hampden–Sydney)

Legend

- (C) Team captain
- (S) Suspended
- (I) Ineligible
- (W) Walk-on
- Injured
- Current redshirt

Roster
Last update: January 16, 2022

== Schedule and results ==
Date time, TV	Rank^{#}	Opponent^{#}	Result	Record	Site (attendance) city, state
Non-conference regular season
November 9, 2021*; 7:00 p.m.		Birmingham–Southern	W 105–98	1–0	Allen Arena (2,161); Nashville, TN
November 12, 2021*; 6:30 p.m.		vs. College of Charleston; Rising Coaches Classic	L 77–86	1–1	TD Arena (4,151); Charleston, SC
November 13, 2021*; 6:30 p.m.		vs. South Carolina State; Rising Coaches Classic	W 93–81	2–1	TD Arena (232); Charleston, SC
November 14, 2021*; 9:30 a.m.		vs. Loyola (MD); Rising Coaches Classic	W 70–65	3–1	TD Arena (144); Charleston, SC
November 17, 2021*; 6:00 p.m.		at Dayton	W 78–59	4–1	UD Arena (13,407); Dayton, OH
November 23, 2021*; 6:00 p.m.		at Tennessee Tech	L 77–88	4–2	Eblen Center (692); Cookeville, TN
November 28, 2021*; 4:00 p.m.		Kentucky Christian	W 86–67	5–2	Allen Arena (1,528); Nashville, TN
December 2, 2021*; 7:00 p.m.		at Belmont	L 65–94	5–3	Curb Event Center (3,856); Nashville, TN
December 5, 2021*; 4:00 p.m., ESPN+		Chattanooga	L 64–85	5–4	Allen Arena (2,081); Nashville, TN
December 8, 2021*; 6:00 p.m., ACCN		at Miami (FL)	L 59–76	5–5	Watsco Center (2,753); Coral Gables, FL
December 12, 2021*; 4:00 p.m., ESPN+		Tennessee State	L 65–73	5–6	Allen Arena (1,983); Nashville, TN
December 15, 2021*; 8:00 p.m., ACCN		at Florida State	L 60–97	5–7	Donald L. Tucker Civic Center (5,027); Tallahassee, FL
December 19, 2021*; 4:00 p.m., ESPN+		Tennessee Wesleyan	W 98–64	6–7	Allen Arena (1,022); Nashville, TN
December 22, 2021*; 7:00 p.m., SECN		at No. 17 LSU	L 60–95	6–8	Pete Maravich Assembly Center (10,767); Baton Rouge, LA
December 30, 2021*; 7:00 p.m., ESPN+		Alabama A&M	W 66–63	7–8	Allen Arena (1,175); Nashville, TN
ASUN Conference regular season
January 4, 2022; 7:00 p.m., ESPN+		North Alabama	W 84–74	8–8 (1–0)	Allen Arena (1,669); Nashville, TN
January 8, 2022; 3:15 p.m., ESPN+		at Central Arkansas	L 88–93	8–9 (1–1)	Farris Center (539); Conway, AR
January 11, 2022; 6:00 p.m., ESPN+		at Jacksonville State	L 83–88	8–10 (1–2)	Pete Mathews Coliseum (2,216); Jacksonville, AL
January 15, 2022; 4:00 p.m., ESPN+		Bellarmine	L 71–77	8–11 (1–3)	Allen Arena (3,026); Nashville, TN
January 18, 2022; 4:00 p.m., ESPN+		at Eastern Kentucky	L 72–86	8–12 (1–4)	Alumni Coliseum (2,593); Richmond, KY
January 22, 2022; 4:00 p.m., ESPN+		Kennesaw State	W 77–73	9–12 (2–4)	Allen Arena (0); Nashville, TN
January 27, 2022; 6:00 p.m., ESPN+		at Jacksonville	L 59–66	9–13 (2–5)	Swisher Gymnasium (1,024); Jacksonville, FL
January 29, 2022; 4:00 p.m., ESPN+		at North Florida	W 77–74	10–13 (3–5)	UNF Arena (1,793); Jacksonville, FL
February 3, 2022; 7:15 p.m., ESPN+		Stetson	L 71–77	10–14 (3–6)	Allen Arena (2,655); Nashville, TN
February 5, 2022; 4:00 p.m., ESPN+		Florida Gulf Coast	L 68–77	10–15 (3–7)	Allen Arena (2,660); Nashville, TN
February 8, 2022; 6:00 p.m., ESPN+		at Liberty	L 69–78	10–16 (3–8)	Liberty Arena (3,075); Lynchburg, VA
February 12, 2022; 4:00 p.m., ESPN+		Eastern Kentucky	W 83–73	11–16 (4–8)	Allen Arena (1,344); Nashville, TN
February 16, 2022; 7:00 p.m., ESPN+		Jacksonville State	L 67–78	11–17 (4–9)	Allen Arena (1,795); Nashville, TN
February 19, 2022; 3:30 p.m., ESPN+		at North Alabama	W 75–72	12–17 (5–9)	Flowers Hall (833); Florence, AL
February 23, 2022; 6:00 p.m., ESPN+		at Bellarmine	L 73–76	12–18 (5–10)	Freedom Hall (1,376); Louisville, KY
February 26, 2022; 1:00 p.m., ESPN+		Central Arkansas	W 81–66	13–18 (6–10)	Allen Arena; Nashville, TN
ASUN tournament
March 1, 2022; 6:00 p.m., ESPN+	(W4)	(E5) North Florida; First round	W 74–65	14–18	Allen Arena (1,079); Nashville, TN
March 3, 2022; 6:00 p.m., ESPN+	(W4)	at (E1) Liberty; Quarterfinals	L 47–52	14–19	Liberty Arena (2,486); Lynchburg, VA
*Non-conference game. ^{#}Rankings from AP poll. (#) Tournament seedings in parentheses. All times are in Central.
