= 2022 ASUN men's basketball tournament =

American college basketball postseason tournament

- Classification: Division I
- Season: 2021–22
- Teams: 12
- Site: Campus sites
- Champions: Bellarmine
- Winning coach: Scott Davenport (1st title)
- MVP: Dylan Penn (Bellarmine)
- Television: ESPN+, ESPN

The 2022 ASUN men's basketball tournament was the conference postseason tournament for the ASUN Conference. The tournament was the 43rd year the league has conducted a postseason tournament. The tournament was held March 1, 3, 5, and 8, 2022 at campus sites of the higher seeds. The winner, Bellarmine, did not receive the conference's automatic bid to the 2022 NCAA Division I men's basketball tournament due to not being eligible because of a transition from Division II. Instead the regular season conference champion, Jacksonville State, was awarded the conference's automatic bid.

2021–22 ASUN men's basketball standings
| | Conf. | | | | Overall |
| Team | W | | L | PCT | W | | L | PCT |
|---|---|---|---|---|---|---|---|---|
East
| Liberty | 12 | – | 4 | .750 | 22 | – | 11 | .667 |
| Jacksonville | 11 | – | 5 | .688 | 21 | – | 10 | .677 |
| Florida Gulf Coast | 10 | – | 6 | .625 | 22 | – | 12 | .647 |
| Kennesaw State | 7 | – | 9 | .438 | 13 | – | 18 | .419 |
| North Florida | 7 | – | 9 | .438 | 11 | – | 20 | .355 |
| Stetson | 5 | – | 11 | .313 | 11 | – | 19 | .367 |
West
| Jacksonville State^ | 13 | – | 3 | .813 | 21 | – | 11 | .656 |
| Bellarmine* † | 11 | – | 5 | .688 | 20 | – | 13 | .606 |
| Central Arkansas | 7 | – | 9 | .438 | 11 | – | 20 | .355 |
| Lipscomb | 6 | – | 10 | .375 | 14 | – | 19 | .424 |
| Eastern Kentucky | 5 | – | 11 | .313 | 13 | – | 18 | .419 |
| North Alabama* | 2 | – | 14 | .125 | 9 | – | 21 | .300 |
† 2022 ASUN tournament winner *Ineligible for the 2022 NCAA tournament due to transition from Division II^Due to Bellarmine's ineligibility, the regular-season champions Jacksonville State took their NCAA tournament berth instead.

== Seeds ==
All teams in the conference qualified for the tournament. Teams were seeded by their record in conference play, with a tiebreaker system to seed teams with identical conference records. The top two teams from each division received byes into the quarterfinals. Kennesaw State got a higher seed than North Florida through the NET ranking tiebreaker.

The two tiebreakers used by the ASUN are: 1) head-to-head record of teams with identical record and 2) NCAA NET Rankings available on day following the conclusion of ASUN regular season play. These tiebreakers are also used to separate teams with the same seed from opposite divisions if necessary. This proved relevant when both #2 seeds, Bellarmine and Jacksonville, advanced to the championship game. With both having identical conference records, the tiebreaker was applied, and Bellarmine received home court by virtue of its win over Jacksonville in the teams' only regular-season game.

| Seed | School | Conference | NET ranking (February 28, 2021) |
|---|---|---|---|
| #1 East | Liberty | 12–4 | 116th |
| #1 West | Jacksonville State | 13–3 | 138th |
| #2 East | Jacksonville | 11–5 | 168th |
| #2 West | Bellarmine | 11–5 | 220th |
| #3 East | Florida Gulf Coast | 10–6 | 189th |
| #3 West | Central Arkansas | 7–9 | 319th |
| #4 East | Kennesaw State | 7–9 | 230th |
| #4 West | Lipscomb | 6–10 | 276th |
| #5 East | North Florida | 7–9 | 274th |
| #5 West | Eastern Kentucky | 5–11 | 265th |
| #6 East | Stetson | 5–11 | 306th |
| #6 West | North Alabama | 2–14 | 314th |

== Schedule ==
| Game | Time | Matchup | Score | Television |
First round – Tuesday, March 1 – Campus Sites
| 1 | 6:00 pm | E6 Stetson at W3 Central Arkansas | 73–74 | ESPN+ |
| 2 | 6:00 pm | W5 Eastern Kentucky at E4 Kennesaw State | 73–82 | ESPN+ |
| 3 | 6:00 pm | W6 North Alabama at E3 Florida Gulf Coast | 72–81 | ESPN+ |
| 4 | 6:00 pm | E5 North Florida at W4 Lipscomb | 65–74 | ESPN+ |
Quarterfinals – Thursday, March 3 – Campus Sites
| 5 | 6:00 pm | W3 Central Arkansas at E2 Jacksonville | 69–79 | ESPN+ |
| 6 | 6:00 pm | E4 Kennesaw State at W1 Jacksonville State | 67–78 | ESPN+ |
| 7 | 6:00 pm | E3 Florida Gulf Coast at W2 Bellarmine | 68–81 | ESPN+ |
| 8 | 6:00 pm | W4 Lipscomb at E1 Liberty | 47–52 | ESPN+ |
Semifinals – Saturday, March 5 – Campus Sites
| 9 | 6:00 pm | E2 Jacksonville at W1 Jacksonville State | 54–51 | ESPN+ |
| 10 | 5:00 pm | W2 Bellarmine at E1 Liberty | 53–50 | ESPN+ |
Championship – Tuesday, March 8 – Campus Sites
| 11 | 4:00 pm | E2 Jacksonville at W2 Bellarmine | 72–77 | ESPN |
Game times in CT. Rankings denote tournament seed

== Bracket ==
Because Bellarmine won the ASUN Tournament, the conference's top overall seed, Jacksonville State, claimed the automatic bid to the NCAA Tournament. The same would have applied if North Alabama had won the tournament, but the Lions were eliminated in the first round.

First Round; Tuesday, March 1st, 2022 ESPN+
3W | Central Arkansas | 74
6E | Stetson | 73
4E | Kennesaw State | 82
5W | Eastern Kentucky | 73
3E | Florida Gulf Coast | 81
6W | North Alabama | 72
4W | Lipscomb | 74
5E | North Florida | 65

Quarterfinals; Thursday, March 3rd, 2022 ESPN+
2E | Jacksonville | 79
3W | Central Arkansas | 69
1W | Jacksonville State | 78
4E | Kennesaw State | 67
2W | Bellarmine | 81
3E | Florida Gulf Coast | 68
1E | Liberty | 52
4W | Lipscomb | 47

Semifinals; Saturday, March 5th, 2022 ESPN+
2E | Jacksonville | 54
1W | Jacksonville State | 51
2W | Bellarmine | 53
1E | Liberty | 50

Championship game Tuesday, March 8th, 2022 ESPN
2E | Jacksonville | 72
2W | Bellarmine | 77
