= 2021–22 Summit League men's basketball season =

2021-22 Summit League men's basketball season
- League: NCAA Division I
- Sport: Basketball
- Teams: 10

Regular Season
- Regular season champion: South Dakota State
- Season MVP: Baylor Scheierman, South Dakota State

Summit League tournament
- Champions: South Dakota State
- Runners-up: North Dakota State

Seasons
- ← 2020–21 2022–23 →

2021–22 Summit League men's basketball standings
	Conf.				Overall
Team	W		L	PCT	W		L	PCT
South Dakota State †	18	–	0	1.000	30	–	5	.857
North Dakota State	13	–	5	.722	23	–	10	.697
Kansas City	12	–	6	.667	19	–	12	.613
Oral Roberts	12	–	6	.667	19	–	12	.613
South Dakota	11	–	7	.611	19	–	12	.613
Western Illinois	7	–	11	.389	16	–	16	.500
Denver	7	–	11	.389	11	–	21	.344
St. Thomas *	4	–	14	.222	10	–	20	.333
Omaha	4	–	14	.222	5	–	25	.167
North Dakota	2	–	16	.111	6	–	25	.194
† 2022 Summit League tournament winner * Ineligible for the 2022 NCAA tournament due to transition from Division III

The 2021–22 Summit League Conference men's basketball season started non-conference play on November 9, 2021, and began conference play on December 20, 2021. The regular season ended on February 26, 2022, setting up the 2022 Summit League men's basketball tournament from March 5 to March 8.
South Dakota State was the regular season champion, finishing with a perfect 18-0 conference record for the first time in conference and team history. The Jacks would go on to win the Summit League tournament as well, beating North Dakota State to reach their first NCAA tournament berth in four years.

== Conference changes ==
Due to the addition of St. Thomas (MN), the conference schedule was expanded to 18 games. Each team played every team twice, once at home and once on the road.

== Head coaches ==
=== Coaching changes ===
Denver hired Jeff Wulbrun after Rodney Billups was let go.

=== Coaches ===
Team	Head Coach	Previous Job	Years At School	Record at School	Summit League Record	Summit League Titles	NCAA Tournaments	NCAA Sweet 16's
Denver	Jeff Wulbrun	Stanford (Assistant)	1	0-0	0-0	0	0	0
Kansas City	Billy Donlon	Northwestern (Assistant)	3	27-27	7-7	0	0	0
Omaha	Derrin Hansen	Omaha (Assistant)	17	246-233*	64-74	0	0**	0***
North Dakota	Paul Sather	Northern State (Assistant)	3	24-35	15-17	0	0	0
North Dakota State	David Richman	North Dakota State (Assistant)	8	136-87	69-41	3	2	0
Oral Roberts	Paul Mills	Baylor (Assistant)	5	57-66	31-30	1	1	1
St. Thomas	John Tauer	St. Thomas (Assistant)	11	224-57^	0-0	0	0^^	0^^^
South Dakota	Todd Lee	Grand Canyon (Assistant)	4	47-40	28-19	0	0	0
South Dakota State	Eric Henderson	South Dakota State (Assistant)	3	38-17	22-6	1	1	0
Western Illinois	Rob Jeter	Minnesota (Assistant)	2	7-15	5-9	0	0	0

Notes:

- Year at school includes 2021–22 season.
- Overall and Summit League records are from the time at current school and are through the end of the 2020–21 season.
- NCAA Tournament appearances are from the time at current school only.

*110 Wins and 68 Losses at Division II level

**2 NCAA Division II Tournaments

***1 NCAA Division II Sweet 16's and 1 NCAA Division II Elite 8

^All wins and losses at Division III level

^^8 NCAA Division III Tournaments

^^^4 NCAA Division III Sweet 16, 2 NCAA Division III Final Fours, and 1 NCAA Division III National Championship

== Preseason awards ==
The Preseason Summit League men's basketball polls was released on October 12, 2021.

=== Preseason men's basketball polls ===
First Place Votes in Parentheses

1. South Dakota State (23) - 636
2. North Dakota State (7) - 606
3. Oral Roberts (6) - 545
4. South Dakota - 480
5. Western Illinois - 356
6. Kansas City - 341
7. North Dakota - 279
8. Omaha - 255
9. Denver - 217
10. St. Thomas 120

=== Preseason honors ===
Honor	Recipient
Preseason Player of the Year	Max Abmas, Oral Roberts
Preseason All-Summit League First Team	Max Abmas, Oral Roberts
Preseason All-Summit League First Team	Josiah Allick, Kansas City
Preseason All-Summit League First Team	Sam Griesel, North Dakota State
Preseason All-Summit League First Team	Rocky Kreuser, North Dakota State
Preseason All-Summit League First Team	Baylor Scheierman, South Dakota State
Preseason All-Summit League First Team	Douglas Wilson, South Dakota State
Preseason All-Summit League Second Team	Will Carius, Western Illinois
Preseason All-Summit League Second Team	Tyree Eady, North Dakota State
Preseason All-Summit League Second Team	Noah Freidel, South Dakota State
Preseason All-Summit League Second Team	Xavier Fuller, South Dakota
Preseason All-Summit League Second Team	Tasos Kamateros, South Dakota

== Regular season ==
=== Conference standings ===
		Conference		Overall		
Rank	Team	Record	Percent	Record	Percent	Tiebreaker
1	South Dakota State	18–0	1.000	30–5	.857	
2	North Dakota State	13–5	.722	23–10	.697	
3	Kansas City	12–6	.667	19–12	.613	
4	Oral Roberts	12–6	.667	19–12	.613	
5	South Dakota	11–7	.611	19–12	.613	
6	Western Illinois	7–11	.389	16–16	.500	
7	Denver	7–11	.389	11–21	.344	
8	St. Thomas	4–14	.222	10–20	.333	
9	Omaha	4–14	.222	5–25	.167	
10	North Dakota	2–16	.111	6–25	.194	

=== Conference matrix ===
	Denver	Kansas City	Omaha	North Dakota	North Dakota State	Oral Roberts	St. Thomas	South Dakota	South Dakota State	Western Illinois
vs. Denver	–	1-1	1-1	0-2	2-0	2-0	0-2	2-0	2-0	1-1
vs. Kansas City	1-1	–	1-1	0-2	0-2	2-0	0-2	0-2	2-0	2-0
vs. Omaha	1-1	1-1	–	1-1	2-0	2-0	2-0	2-0	2-0	1-1
vs. North Dakota	2-0	2-0	1-1	–	2-0	2-0	1-1	2-0	2-0	2-0
vs. North Dakota State	0-2	2-0	0-2	0-2	–	0-2	0-2	0-2	2-0	1-1
vs. Oral Roberts	0-2	0-2	0-2	0-2	2-0	–	0-2	1-1	2-0	1-1
vs. St. Thomas	2-0	2-0	0-2	1-1	2-0	2-0	–	2-0	2-0	1-1
vs. South Dakota	0-2	2-0	0-2	0-2	2-0	1-1	0-2	–	2-0	0-2
vs. South Dakota State	0-2	0-2	0-2	0-2	0-2	0-2	0-2	0-2	–	0-2
vs. Western Illinois	1-1	2-0	1-1	0-2	1-1	1-1	1-1	2-0	1-0	–

=== Players of the Week ===
Week	Player(s) of the Week	School
Nov. 15	Baylor Scheierman	South Dakota State
Nov. 22	Evan Gilyard II	Kansas City
Nov. 29	Noah Freidel	South Dakota State (2)
Dec. 6	Colton Sandage	Western Illinois
Dec. 13	Baylor Scheierman (2)	South Dakota State (3)
Dec. 20	Francis Lacis	Oral Roberts
Dec. 27	Trent Massner	Western Illinois (2)
Jan. 3	Max Abmas	Oral Roberts (2)
Jan. 10	Max Abmas (2)	Oral Roberts (3)
Jan. 17	Trent Massner (2)	Western Illinois (3)
Jan. 24	Tevin Smith	Denver
Jan. 31	Max Abmas (3)	Oral Roberts (3)
Feb. 7	Marvin Nesbitt Jr. Baylor Scheierman (3)	Kansas City (2); South Dakota State (4)
Feb. 14	Sam Griesel	North Dakota State
Feb. 21	Evan Gilyard II (2)	Kansas City (3)
Feb. 28	Luke Appel	South Dakota State (5)

=== Records against other conferences ===
Power 7 Conferences	Record	Power 7 Conferences	Record
ACC	None	American	1-0
Big East	0-2	Big Ten	1-5
Big 12	0-5	Pac-12	1-2
SEC	1-1	Power 7 Total	4-15
Other Division I Conferences	Record	Other Division I Conferences	Record
Atlantic 10	1-1	ASUN	1-1
America East	None	Big Sky	5-7
Big South	None	Big West	3-0
Colonial	None	Conference USA	0-3
Horizon League	3-2	Ivy League	None
MAAC	1-0	MAC	3-0
MEAC	None	MVC	2-5
MWC	2-8	NEC	1-0
OVC	3-4	Patriot League	None
SoCon	None	Southland	2-2
SWAC	2-0	Sun Belt	3-2
WAC	2-6	WCC	2-0
Other Division I Total			40-41
NCAA Division I Total			40-56
NCAA Division II Total			2-0
NCAA Division III Total			7-0
NAIA Total			9-1
NCCAA Total			4-0
Total Non-Conference Record			62-57

=== Points scored ===
Team	For	Against	Difference
Denver	2257	2380	-123
Kansas City	2311	2085	+226
North Dakota	2178	2444	-266
North Dakota State	2469	2267	+202
Omaha	2088	2505	-417
Oral Roberts	2582	2306	+276
St. Thomas	2241	2260	-19
South Dakota	2329	2198	+131
South Dakota State	3005	2561	+444
Western Illinois	2493	2470	+23

Through March 8, 2022

=== Home attendance ===
Team	Arena	Capacity	Total Games	Average Attendance	Attendance High	Total Attendance	% of Capacity
Denver	Hamilton Gymnasium	2,500	13	792	1,607; Nov. 7 vs. Regis	10,305	31.7%
Kansas City	Swinney Recreation Center	1,500	13†	749	**1,558**; Feb. 26 vs. South Dakota St	9,738	50.0%
North Dakota	Betty Engelstad Sioux Center	3,300	15	1,380	2,541; Feb. 26 vs. North Dakota St	20,712	41.8%
North Dakota State	Scheels Center	5,460	15	1,913	3,510; Dec. 22 vs. North Dakota	28,700	35.0%
Omaha	Baxter Arena	7,898	10†	1,348	1,957; Jan. 29 vs. Kansas City	13,480	17.0%
Oral Roberts	Mabee Center	10,154	15	4,047	6,094; Nov. 26 vs. Oklahoma St	60,714	39.9%
St. Thomas	Schoenecker Arena	1,800	13	947	1,405; Feb. 12 vs. North Dakota St	12,323	52.7%
South Dakota	Sanford Coyote Sports Center	6,000	15	1,658	4,224; Feb. 5 vs. South Dakota St	24,883	27.6%
South Dakota State	Frost Arena	6,500	14	2,298	3,821; Jan. 29 vs. North Dakota St	32,180	35.4%
Western Illinois	Western Hall	5,139	12†	886	1,500; Nov. 16 vs. Iowa Wesleyan	10,635	17.2%

Bold - Exceed capacity
† - Does not include games where an attendance figure was not given
As of February 27, 2022
Does not include exhibition games

=== All-League Honors ===
Honor	Recipient
Player of the Year	Baylor Scheierman, South Dakota State
Defensive Player of the Year	Marvin Nesbitt Jr., Kansas City
Sixth Man of the Year	Luke Appel, South Dakota State
Freshman of the Year	Paul Bruns, North Dakota
Newcomer of the Year	Evan Gilyard II, Kansas City
Coach of the Year	Eric Henderson, South Dakota State
All-Summit League First Team	Max Abmas, Oral Roberts
All-Summit League First Team	Evan Gilyard II, Kansas City
All-Summit League First Team	Sam Griesel, North Dakota State
All-Summit League First Team	Rocky Kreuser, North Dakota State
All-Summit League First Team	Baylor Scheierman, South Dakota State
All-Summit League First Team	Douglas Wilson, South Dakota State
All-Summit League Second Team	Mason Archambault, South Dakota
All-Summit League Second Team	Trenton Massner, Western Illinois
All-Summit League Second Team	Marvin Nesbitt Jr., Kansas City
All-Summit League Second Team	Kruz Perrott-Hunt, South Dakota
All-Summit League Second Team	Arkel Lamar, Kansas City
All-Summit League Honorable Mention	Luke Barisic, Western Illinois
All-Summit League Honorable Mention	Paul Bruns, North Dakota
All-Summit League Honorable Mention	K.J. Hunt, Denver
All-Summit League Honorable Mention	Tasos Kamateros, South Dakota
All-Summit League Honorable Mention	Issac McBride, Oral Roberts
All-Defensive Team	Boogie Anderson, South Dakota
All-Defensive Team	Tyree Eady, North Dakota State
All-Defensive Team	Trenton Massner, Western Illinois
All-Defensive Team	Marvin Nesbitt Jr., Kansas City
All-Defensive Team	Douglas Wilson, South Dakota State
All-Newcomer Team	Luka Barisic, Western Illinois
All-Newcomer Team	Evan Gilyard II, Kansas City
All-Newcomer Team	K.J. Hunt, Denver
All-Newcomer Team	Trenton Massner, Western Illinois
All-Newcomer Team	Zeke Mayo, South Dakota State

== Postseason ==
=== Conference tournament ===
The top 8 teams from the Summit League qualify for the conference tournament. The tournament is at the Denny Sanford Premier Center in Sioux Falls, South Dakota.

Quarterfinals; March 5 & 6 ESPN+
1	South Dakota State	87
8	Omaha	79
4	Kansas City	61
5	South Dakota	74
2	North Dakota State	82
7	Denver	62
3	Oral Roberts	80
6	Western Illinois	68

Semifinals; March 7 ESPN+
1	South Dakota State	83
5	South Dakota	60
2	North Dakota State	92
3	Oral Roberts	72

Championship; March 8 ESPN2
1	South Dakota State	75
2	North Dakota State	69

=== NCAA tournament ===
Only South Dakota State was selected to participate in the tournament as the conference's automatic bid.

Seed	Region	School	First Round	Second Round	Sweet Sixteen	Elite Eight	Final Four	Championship
No. 13	Buffalo Regional	South Dakota State	No. 4 Providence	—	—	—	—	—
	1 Bid	W-L (%):	0–1 (.000)	0–0 (–)	0–0 (–)	0–0 (–)	0–0 (–)	TOTAL: 0–1 (.000)
