= 2021–22 South Dakota State Jackrabbits men's basketball team =

American college basketball season

2021–22 South Dakota State Jackrabbits men's basketball

Summit League regular season and tournament champions

NCAA tournament, First Round
- Conference: Summit League
- Record: 30–5 (18–0 The Summit)
- Head coach: Eric Henderson (3rd season)
- Associate head coach: Rob Klinkefus
- Assistant coaches: Bryan Petersen; Khyle Marshall
- Home arena: Frost Arena

2021–22 Summit League men's basketball standings
	Conf.				Overall
Team	W		L	PCT	W		L	PCT
South Dakota State †	18	–	0	1.000	30	–	5	.857
North Dakota State	13	–	5	.722	23	–	10	.697
Kansas City	12	–	6	.667	19	–	12	.613
Oral Roberts	12	–	6	.667	19	–	12	.613
South Dakota	11	–	7	.611	19	–	12	.613
Western Illinois	7	–	11	.389	16	–	16	.500
Denver	7	–	11	.389	11	–	21	.344
St. Thomas *	4	–	14	.222	10	–	20	.333
Omaha	4	–	14	.222	5	–	25	.167
North Dakota	2	–	16	.111	6	–	25	.194
† 2022 Summit League tournament winner * Ineligible for the 2022 NCAA tournament due to transition from Division III

The 2021–22 South Dakota State Jackrabbits men's basketball team represented South Dakota State University in the 2021–22 NCAA Division I men's basketball season. The Jackrabbits, led by third-year head coach Eric Henderson, played their home games at Frost Arena in Brookings, South Dakota, as members of the Summit League. They finished the season 30–5, 18–0 in Summit League Play to finish as regular season champions. As the No. 1 seed, they defeated Omaha, South Dakota, and North Dakota State to win the Summit League tournament. They received the conference’s automatic bid to the NCAA tournament as the No. 13 seed in the Midwest Region, where they lost in the first round to Providence.

This was the first season in program history that the Jackrabbits eclipsed 30 wins in a single campaign.

== Previous season ==
In a season limited due to the ongoing COVID-19 pandemic, the Jackrabbits finished the 2020–21 season 16–7, 9–3 in Summit League play to finish as Summit League regular season champions. They defeated Omaha in the quarterfinals of the Summit League tournament, before being upset by the No. 4-seeded and eventual tournament champions, Oral Roberts, in the semifinals.

== Roster ==
2021–22 South Dakota State Jackrabbits men's basketball team
Players
Coaches

Pos.	#	Name	Height	Weight	Year	Previous school	Hometown
G	0	Jaylon Gentry	5 ft 9 in (1.75 m)	175 lb (79 kg)	Jr	Central Wyoming College	Brown Deer, WI
G	1	Matt Mims	6 ft 0 in (1.83 m)	175 lb (79 kg)	So	Xavier HS	Cedar Rapids, IA
G	2	Zeke Mayo	6 ft 3 in (1.91 m)	179 lb (81 kg)	Fr	Lawrence HS	Lawrence, KS
G	3	Baylor Scheierman	6 ft 6 in (1.98 m)	205 lb (93 kg)	So	Aurora HS	Aurora, NE
G/F	10	David Wingett	6 ft 7 in (2.01 m)	210 lb (95 kg)	So	Memphis	Winnebago, NE
F	13	Luke Appel	6 ft 8 in (2.03 m)	240 lb (109 kg)	Jr	Kirkwood CC	Marshalltown, IA
G	15	Noah Freidel	6 ft 4 in (1.93 m)	200 lb (91 kg)	So	Tea HS	Tea, SD
F	22	Aaron Fiegen	6 ft 7 in (2.01 m)	200 lb (91 kg)	So	Madison HS	Madison, SD
G	30	Charlie Easley	6 ft 2 in (1.88 m)	185 lb (84 kg)	So	Nebraska	Lincoln, NE
F	32	Matt Dentlinger	6 ft 8 in (2.03 m)	240 lb (109 kg)	RS Jr	Kuemper Catholic HS	Arcadia, IA
F	33	Broden Lien	6 ft 8 in (2.03 m)	235 lb (107 kg)	Fr	Andrews Osborne Academy	Flom, MN
G	34	Alex Arians	6 ft 4 in (1.93 m)	200 lb (91 kg)	RS Sr	Edgewood HS	Madison, WI
F	35	Douglas Wilson	6 ft 7 in (2.01 m)	220 lb (100 kg)	GS	Kirkwood CC	Des Moines, IA

Head coach

- Eric Henderson (Wayne State (NE))

Assistant coach(es)

- Rob Klinkefus (Buena Vista)
- Bryan Petersen (Iowa State)
- Khyle Marshall (Butler)

Legend

- (C) Team captain
- (S) Suspended
- (I) Ineligible
- (W) Walk-on
- Injured
- Current redshirt

Roster
Last update: October 26, 2021

== Schedule and results ==
Date time, TV	Rank^{#}	Opponent^{#}	Result	Record	Site (attendance) city, state
Non-conference regular season
November 9, 2021*; 8:15 pm, MidcoSN/ESPN+		Bradley	W 81–65	1–0	Frost Arena (2,445); Brookings, SD
November 12, 2021*; 7:00 pm, SECN+		at No. 14 Alabama	L 88–104	1–1	Coleman Coliseum (10,546); Tuscaloosa, AL
November 14, 2021*; 2:00 pm, ESPN+		at Stephen F. Austin	W 83–71	2–1	William R. Johnson Coliseum (1,878); Nacogdoches, TX
November 17, 2021*; 7:00 pm, MidcoSN/ESPN+		Montana State	W 91–74	3–1	Frost Arena (1,761); Brookings, SD
November 18, 2021*; 8:15 pm, MidcoSN/ESPN+		Presentation	W 99–62	4–1	Frost Arena (1,531); Brookings, SD
November 22, 2021*; 6:00 pm, ESPN+		vs. Nevada; Crossover Classic	W 102–75	5–1	Sanford Pentagon (1,643); Sioux Falls, SD
November 23, 2021*; 8:30 pm, ESPN+		vs. Washington; Crossover Classic	L 76–87	5–2	Sanford Pentagon (1,600); Sioux Falls, SD
November 24, 2021*; 8:30 pm, ESPN+		vs. George Mason; Crossover Classic	W 80–76	6–2	Sanford Pentagon (1,626); Sioux Falls, SD
November 30, 2021*; 7:00 pm		Prairie View A&M	W 99–90	7–2	Frost Arena (1,296); Brookings, SD
December 3, 2021*; 7:00 pm		Minnesota Morris	W 112–47	8–2	Frost Arena (1,284); Brookings, SD
December 8, 2021*; 8:00 pm, ESPN+		at Idaho	L 84–98	8–3	ICCU Arena (1,051); Moscow, ID
December 11, 2021*; 2:00 pm, P12N		vs. Washington State	W 77–74	9–3	Spokane Arena (1,686); Spokane, WA
December 15, 2021*; 6:00 pm, ESPN+		at Missouri State	L 63–75	9–4	JQH Arena (3,027); Springfield, MO
Summit League regular season
December 20, 2021; 7:00 pm, MidcoSN2/ESPN+		Kansas City	W 89–57	10–4 (1–0)	Frost Arena (1,483); Brookings, SD
December 22, 2021; 7:00 pm, MidcoSN/ESPN+		Oral Roberts	W 82–76	11–4 (2–0)	Frost Arena (1,955); Brookings, SD
December 30, 2021; 7:00 pm, ESPN+		at North Dakota State	W 90–86	12–4 (3–0)	Scheels Center (3,408); Fargo, ND
January 1, 2022; 7:00 pm, MidcoSN		at North Dakota	Postponed due to COVID-19 issues		Betty Engelstad Sioux Center; Grand Forks, ND
January 8, 2022; 6:00 pm, MidcoSN/ESPN+		South Dakota	W 84–65	13–4 (4–0)	Frost Arena (3,351); Brookings, SD
January 13, 2022; 7:30 pm		at Omaha	W 95–86	14–4 (5–0)	Baxter Arena; Omaha, NE
January 15, 2022; 2:00 pm		Denver	W 80–62	15–4 (6–0)	Frost Arena (1,595); Brookings, SD
January 20, 2022; 7:00 pm		at St. Thomas	W 92–77	16–4 (7–0)	Schoenecker Arena (1,153); St. Paul, MN
January 22, 2022; 2:00 pm		at Western Illinois	W 93–75	17–4 (8–0)	Western Hall (1,206); Macomb, IL
January 27, 2022; 7:00 pm, MidcoSN/ESPN+		North Dakota	W 96–61	18–4 (9–0)	Frost Arena (1,856); Brookings, SD
January 29, 2022; 2:00 pm, MidcoSN2/ESPN+		North Dakota State	W 80–76	19–4 (10–0)	Frost Arena (3,821); Brookings, SD
January 31, 2022; 7:00 pm, MidcoSN		at North Dakota; Rescheduled from January 1	W 70–64	20–4 (11–0)	Betty Engelstad Sioux Center (1,254); Grand Forks, ND
February 5, 2022; 7:00 pm, MidcoSN/ESPN+		at South Dakota	W 89–79	21–4 (12–0)	Sanford Coyote Sports Center (4,224); Vermillion, SD
February 10, 2022; 8:00 pm		at Denver	W 84–61	22–4 (13–0)	Hamilton Gymnasium (767); Denver, CO
February 12, 2022; 4:15 pm, MidcoSN		Omaha	W 82–61	23–4 (14–0)	Frost Arena (3,380); Brookings, SD
February 17, 2022; 7:00 pm, MidcoSN2/ESPN+		Western Illinois	W 91–66	24–4 (15–0)	Frost Arena (3,345); Brookings, SD
February 19, 2022; 2:00 pm, MidcoSN/ESPN+		St. Thomas	W 79–60	25–4 (16–0)	Frost Arena (3,122); Brookings, SD
February 24, 2022; 7:00 pm		at Oral Roberts	W 106–102 ^{OT}	26–4 (17–0)	Mabee Center (4,894); Tulsa, OK
February 26, 2022; 7:00 pm		at Kansas City	W 86–75	27–4 (18–0)	Swinney Recreation Center (1,558); Kansas City, MO
Summit League tournament
March 5, 2022; 6:00 pm, ESPN+	(1)	vs. (8) Omaha; Quarterfinals	W 87–79	28–4	Denny Sanford Premier Center (9,336); Sioux Falls, SD
March 7, 2022; 6:00 pm, ESPN+	(1)	vs. (5) South Dakota; Semifinals	W 83–60	29–4	Denny Sanford Premier Center (10,418); Sioux Falls, SD
March 8, 2022; 8:00 pm, ESPN2	(1)	vs. (2) North Dakota State; Championship	W 75–69	30–4	Denny Sanford Premier Center; Sioux Falls, SD
NCAA tournament
March 17, 2022; 11:40 am, truTV	(13 MW)	vs. (4 MW) No. 13 Providence; First Round	L 57–66	30–5	KeyBank Center; Buffalo, NY
*Non-conference game. ^{#}Rankings from AP Poll. (#) Tournament seedings in parentheses. All times are in Central.
