= 2021–22 St. Thomas Tommies (Minnesota) men's basketball team =

American college basketball season

2021–22 St. Thomas (Minnesota) Tommies men's basketball
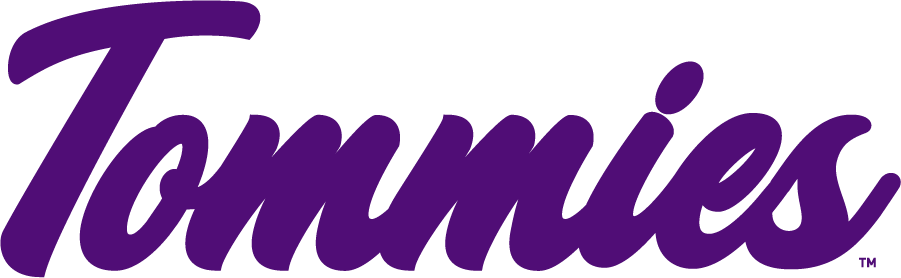
- Conference: Summit League
- Record: 10–20 (4–14 Summit)
- Head coach: John Tauer (11th season)
- Assistant coaches: Mike Maker; Cameron Rundles
- Home arena: Schoenecker Arena

2021–22 Summit League men's basketball standings
| | Conf. | | | | Overall |
| Team | W | | L | PCT | W | | L | PCT |
|---|---|---|---|---|---|---|---|---|
| South Dakota State † | 18 | – | 0 | 1.000 | 30 | – | 5 | .857 |
| North Dakota State | 13 | – | 5 | .722 | 23 | – | 10 | .697 |
| Kansas City | 12 | – | 6 | .667 | 19 | – | 12 | .613 |
| Oral Roberts | 12 | – | 6 | .667 | 19 | – | 12 | .613 |
| South Dakota | 11 | – | 7 | .611 | 19 | – | 12 | .613 |
| Western Illinois | 7 | – | 11 | .389 | 16 | – | 16 | .500 |
| Denver | 7 | – | 11 | .389 | 11 | – | 21 | .344 |
| St. Thomas * | 4 | – | 14 | .222 | 10 | – | 20 | .333 |
| Omaha | 4 | – | 14 | .222 | 5 | – | 25 | .167 |
| North Dakota | 2 | – | 16 | .111 | 6 | – | 25 | .194 |
† 2022 Summit League tournament winner * Ineligible for the 2022 NCAA tournament due to transition from Division III

The 2021–22 St. Thomas Tommies men's basketball team represented the University of St. Thomas in the 2021–22 NCAA Division I men's basketball season. The Tommies, led by 11th-year head coach John Tauer, played their home games at Schoenecker Arena in Saint Paul, Minnesota as members of the Summit League.

The season marked St. Thomas's first year of a five-year transition period from Division III to Division I, an incredibly rare and historic jump that bypasses Division II altogether. As a result, the Tommies are not eligible for NCAA postseason play until 2026–27 and were unable participate in the 2022 Summit League tournament despite finishing eighth place (via overall record tiebreaker) in the Summit League standings.

The Tommies finished the season 10–20, 4–14 in Summit League play, to finish in a tie for eighth place.

== Previous season ==
In a season limited due to the ongoing COVID-19 pandemic, the Tommies finished the 2020–21 NCAA Division III men's basketball season 7–0 overall, 5–0 in MIAC play. Although they were atop the MIAC standings at the time the conference season was canceled due to the COVID-19 pandemic, the MIAC did not officially recognize a regular season champion. Per the NCAA Division III blanket waiver issued in October 2020, student-athletes were allowed to compete up to the established dates of competition maximums without being charged a season of intercollegiate participation during the 2020–21 academic year.

The season marked the last season the Tommies competed in Division III basketball. They had earned four trips to the Division III Final Four (1994, 2011, 2013, 2016) and won two national championships (2011, 2016) during that time.

== Roster ==
2021–22 St. Thomas (Minnesota) Tommies men's basketball team
Players
Coaches

| Pos. | # | Name | Height | Weight | Year | Previous school | Hometown |
|---|---|---|---|---|---|---|---|
| G | 1 | Kevin Cunningham | 6 ft 0 in (1.83 m) | 170 lb (77 kg) | Sr | Loyola Academy | Glenview, IL |
| G | 2 | Ben Nau | 6 ft 2 in (1.88 m) | 185 lb (84 kg) | Fr | Central High School | Brookfield, WI |
| G | 3 | Zach Theisen | 6 ft 0 in (1.83 m) | 175 lb (79 kg) | Sr | Osseo High School | Maple Grove, MN |
| G | 4 | Anders Nelson | 6 ft 0 in (1.83 m) | 175 lb (79 kg) | Sr | Edina High School | Edina, MN |
| F | 5 | Parker Bjorklund | 6 ft 6 in (1.98 m) | 195 lb (88 kg) | Sr | Chaska High School | Chaska, MN |
| G | 10 | Riley Miller | 6 ft 3 in (1.91 m) | 185 lb (84 kg) | Sr | Benilde-St. Margaret's | Eden Prairie, MN |
| G | 12 | Ryan Dufault | 6 ft 0 in (1.83 m) | 175 lb (79 kg) | Fr | Waseca High School | Waseca, MN |
| G/F | 20 | Courtney Jr. Brown | 6 ft 7 in (2.01 m) | 215 lb (98 kg) | Jr | East Ridge High School | Cottage Grove, MN |
| G | 22 | Burt Hedstrom | 6 ft 4 in (1.93 m) | 205 lb (93 kg) | GS | Minnetonka High School | Minnetonka, MN |
| F | 23 | Will Engels | 6 ft 5 in (1.96 m) | 215 lb (98 kg) | Jr | Benet Academy | Clarendon Hills, IL |
| G | 24 | Ryan Lindberg | 6 ft 3 in (1.91 m) | 195 lb (88 kg) | GS | Wayzata High School | Plymouth, MN |
| F | 31 | Brooks Allen | 6 ft 7 in (2.01 m) | 210 lb (95 kg) | Jr | Shakopee High School | Shakopee, MN |
| G | 32 | Dom Martinelli | 6 ft 4 in (1.93 m) | 200 lb (91 kg) | So | Glenbrook South High School | Glenview, IL |
| F | 33 | Bennett Kwiecinski | 6 ft 9 in (2.06 m) | 210 lb (95 kg) | So | Loyola Academy | Chicago, IL |

Head coach

- John Tauer (St. Thomas (MN))

Assistant coach(es)

- Mike Maker (Cal Baptist)
- Gameli Ahelegbe (Minnesota State)
- Cameron Rundles (Wofford)

Legend

- (C) Team captain
- (S) Suspended
- (I) Ineligible
- (W) Walk-on
- Injured
- Current redshirt

Roster
Last update: October 24, 2021

== Schedule and results ==
| Date time, TV | Rank^{#} | Opponent^{#} | Result | Record | High points | High rebounds | High assists | Site (attendance) city, state |
Regular season
| November 9, 2021*; 7:00 p.m., ESPN+ | | at Chicago State | L 72–77 | 0–1 | 19 – Bjorklund | 9 – Bjorklund | 5 – Miller | Jones Convocation Center (300); Chicago, IL |
| November 13, 2021*; 1:00 p.m. | | at St. Francis | W 91–73 | 1–1 | 30 – Miller | 6 – Engels | 6 – Nelson | Daniel Lynch Gymnasium (212); Brooklyn Heights, NY |
| November 15, 2021*; 6:00 p.m., ESPN+ | | at Fordham | L 78–84 | 1–2 | 29 – Nelson | 10 – Bjorklund | 4 – Miller | Rose Hill Gymnasium (698); The Bronx, NY |
| November 19, 2021*; 4:00 p.m., ESPN+ | | at Youngstown State | L 75–79 | 1–3 | 20 – Miller | 6 – Bjorklund | 4 – Nelson | Beeghly Center (1,393); Youngstown, OH |
| November 20, 2021*; 3:45 p.m. | | vs. Niagara | W 76–67 | 2–3 | 19 – Nelson | 11 – Bjorklund | 5 – Nelson | Beeghly Center (1,390); Youngstown, OH |
| November 21, 2021*; 12:00 p.m. | | vs. SIU Edwardsville | W 86–73 | 3–3 | 24 – 2 tied | 7 – Bjorklund | 5 – Nelson | Beeghly Center (1,439); Youngstown, OH |
| November 27, 2021*; 3:00 p.m., ESPN+ | | at Seattle | L 64–81 | 3–4 | 20 – Miller | 6 – Hedstrom | 5 – Miller | Redhawk Center (999); Seattle, WA |
| December 2, 2021*; 7:00 p.m. | | Crown College | W 73–53 | 4–4 | 22 – Miller | – 3 tied | – N/A | Schoenecker Arena (1,008); St. Paul, MN |
| December 5, 2021*; 2:00 p.m., ESPN3 | | at Drake | L 64–74 | 4–5 | 22 – Miller | 11 – Bjorklund | 2 – 2 tied | Knapp Center (2,674); Des Moines, IA |
| December 11, 2021*; 7:00 p.m. | | Montana State | L 65–72 | 4–6 | 17 – Nelson | 8 – Allen | 4 – Nelson | Schoenecker Arena (1,096); St. Paul, MN |
| December 14, 2021*; 7:00 p.m. | | Northland | W 109–50 | 5–6 | 17 – Cunningham | 8 – Engels | 4 – 3 tied | Schoenecker Arena (694); St. Paul, MN |
| December 20, 2021; 7:00 p.m. | | at Omaha | W 80–73 | 6–6 (1–0) | 22 – 2 tied | 8 – Allen | 4 – 2 tied | Baxter Arena (1,483); Omaha, NE |
| December 22, 2021; 3:00 p.m. | | at Denver | L 74–75 | 6–7 (1–1) | 23 – Nelson | 8 – Allen | 3 – 2 tied | Magness Arena (910); Denver, CO |
| December 29, 2021*; 7:00 p.m. | | North Central | W 97–45 | 7–7 | 18 – Hedstrom | 12 – Bjorklund | 8 – Nelson | Schoenecker Arena (662); St. Paul, MN |
| January 1, 2022; 2:00 p.m. | | Western Illinois | W 89–66 | 8–7 (2–1) | 20 – Nelson | 5 – 2 tied | 5 – Nelson | Schoenecker Arena (797); St. Paul, MN |
| January 6, 2022; 7:00 p.m. | | Oral Roberts | L 66–81 | 8–8 (2–2) | 21 – Bjorklund | 6 – Nelson | 3 – Bjorklund | Schoenecker Arena (1,241); St. Paul, MN |
| January 8, 2022; 7:00 pm | | Kansas City | Postponed due to COVID-19 issues | | | | | Schoenecker Arena; St. Paul, MN |
| January 13, 2022; 7:00 pm | | at North Dakota State | Postponed due to COVID-19 issues | | | | | Scheels Center; Fargo, ND |
| January 15, 2022; 1:00 pm | | at North Dakota | Postponed due to COVID-19 issues | | | | | Betty Engelstad Sioux Center; Grand Forks, ND |
| January 20, 2022; 7:00 p.m. | | South Dakota State | L 77–92 | 8–9 (2–3) | 18 – Lindberg | 3 – 5 tied | 3 – 3 tied | Schoenecker Arena (1,153); St. Paul, MN |
| January 22, 2022; 7:00 p.m. | | South Dakota | L 79–90 | 8–10 (2–4) | 24 – Miller | 6 – 2 tied | 4 – Miller | Schoenecker Arena (746); St. Paul, MN |
| January 25, 2022; 7:00 p.m., ESPN+ | | at North Dakota State; Rescheduled from January 13 | L 56–77 | 8–11 (2–5) | 18 – Allen | 8 – Allen | 3 – Allen | Scheels Center (1,240); Fargo, ND |
| January 29, 2022; 2:00 p.m. | | at Western Illinois | L 52–81 | 8–12 (2–6) | 12 – Nelson | 5 – Martinelli | 4 – Miller | Western Hall (589); Macomb, IL |
| February 3, 2022; 7:00 p.m. | | at Kansas City | L 72–81 | 8–13 (2–7) | 26 – Bjorklund | 8 – Bjorklund | 4 – Nelson | Swinney Recreation Center (584); Kansas City, MO |
| February 5, 2022; 7:00 p.m. | | at Oral Roberts | L 66–88 | 8–14 (2–8) | 25 – Bjorklund | 6 – Bjorklund | 2 – 2 tied | Mabee Center (4,412); Tulsa, OK |
| February 8, 2022; 7:00 p.m. | | Kansas City; Rescheduled from January 8 | L 67–76 | 8–15 (2–9) | 19 – Lindberg | 9 – Bjorklund | 4 – Nelson | Schoenecker Arena (710); St. Paul, MN |
| February 10, 2022; 7:00 p.m. | | North Dakota | L 70–78 | 8–16 (2–10) | 13 – Miller | 7 – Nelson | 2 – 2 tied | Schoenecker Arena (890); St. Paul, MN |
| February 12, 2022; 7:00 p.m. | | North Dakota State | L 64–75 | 8–17 (2–11) | 17 – 2 tied | 6 – Bjorklund | 2 – 2 tied | Schoenecker Arena (1,405); St. Paul, MN |
| February 17, 2022; 7:00 p.m., ESPN+ | | at South Dakota | L 60–81 | 8–18 (2–12) | 17 – Miller | 6 – Hedstrom | 4 – Bjorklund | Sanford Coyote Sports Center (1,770); Vermillion, SD |
| February 19, 2022; 2:00 p.m., ESPN3 | | at South Dakota State | L 60–79 | 8–19 (2–13) | 27 – Miller | 8 – Bjorklund | 4 – Allen | Frost Arena (3,122); Brookings, SD |
| February 22, 2022; 12:00 p.m. | | at North Dakota; Rescheduled from January 15 | W 84–74 | 9–19 (3–13) | 14 – Lindberg | 11 – Allen | 4 – Hedstrom | Betty Engelstad Sioux Center (1,173); Grand Forks, ND |
| February 24, 2022; 7:00 p.m. | | Denver | L 80–91 | 9–20 (3–14) | 22 – Allen | 6 – Allen | 3 – 2 tied | Schoenecker Arena (770); St. Paul, MN |
| February 26, 2022; 7:00 p.m. | | Omaha | W 95–74 | 10–20 (4–14) | 20 – Nelson | 9 – Bjorklund | 3 – Nelson | Schoenecker Arena (1,150); St. Paul, MN |
*Non-conference game. ^{#}Rankings from AP poll. (#) Tournament seedings in parentheses. All times are in Central.
