= 2021–22 North Dakota State Bison men's basketball team =

American college basketball season

2021–22 North Dakota State Bison men's basketball
- Conference: Summit League
- Record: 23–10 (13–5 Summit)
- Head coach: David Richman (8th season)
- Associate head coach: Kyan Brown
- Assistant coaches: Joshua Jones; Josh Sash
- Home arena: Scheels Center

2021–22 Summit League men's basketball standings
	Conf.				Overall
Team	W		L	PCT	W		L	PCT
South Dakota State †	18	–	0	1.000	30	–	5	.857
North Dakota State	13	–	5	.722	23	–	10	.697
Kansas City	12	–	6	.667	19	–	12	.613
Oral Roberts	12	–	6	.667	19	–	12	.613
South Dakota	11	–	7	.611	19	–	12	.613
Western Illinois	7	–	11	.389	16	–	16	.500
Denver	7	–	11	.389	11	–	21	.344
St. Thomas *	4	–	14	.222	10	–	20	.333
Omaha	4	–	14	.222	5	–	25	.167
North Dakota	2	–	16	.111	6	–	25	.194
† 2022 Summit League tournament winner * Ineligible for the 2022 NCAA tournament due to transition from Division III

The 2021–22 North Dakota State Bison men's basketball team represented North Dakota State University in the 2021–22 NCAA Division I men's basketball season. The Bison, led by eighth-year head coach David Richman, played their home games at the Scheels Center in Fargo, North Dakota, as members of the Summit League.
The Bison went into the Summit League tournament as the number 2 seed. They beat Denver and Oral Roberts before falling to South Dakota State in the championship game.

== Previous season ==
The Bison finished the 2020–21 season 15–12, 11–5 in Summit League play to finish in third place. In the Summit League tournament, they defeated Kansas City in the quarterfinals, South Dakota in the semifinals, before falling to Oral Roberts in the championship game.

== Roster ==
2021–22 North Dakota State Bison men's basketball team
Players
Coaches

Pos.	#	Name	Height	Weight	Year	Hometown
G	0	Dezmond McKinney	6 ft 0 in (1.83 m)	180 lb (82 kg)	Fr	Raytown South High School	Raytown, MO
G	2	Willie Guy	5 ft 11 in (1.8 m)	190 lb (86 kg)	So	Des Moines Area Community College	Cedar Rapids, IA
G	3	Tyree Eady	6 ft 5 in (1.96 m)	210 lb (95 kg)	Jr	Middleton High School	Middleton, WI
F	4	Grant Nelson	6 ft 11 in (2.11 m)	225 lb (102 kg)	Fr	Devils Lake High School	Devils Lake, ND
G/F	5	Sam Griesel	6 ft 6 in (1.98 m)	220 lb (100 kg)	Jr	Lincoln East High School	Lincoln, NE
G	11	Jarius Cook	6 ft 3 in (1.91 m)	180 lb (82 kg)	So	Park Center High School	Brooklyn Park, MN
G	12	Andrew Kallman	6 ft 4 in (1.93 m)	190 lb (86 kg)	Sr	Northern State	Chaska, MN
G	21	Boden Skunberg	6 ft 5 in (1.96 m)	205 lb (93 kg)	Fr	Jamestown High School	Jamestown, ND
F	22	Joshua Streit	6 ft 8 in (2.03 m)	230 lb (104 kg)	Fr	Eden Valley-Watkins High School	Watkins, MN
G	23	Maleeck Harden-Hayes	6 ft 7 in (2.01 m)	185 lb (84 kg)	So	Moorhead High School	Moorhead, MN
G	24	Grayson Haman	6 ft 4 in (1.93 m)	195 lb (88 kg)	Fr	Fargo Davies High School	Fargo, ND
F	32	Andrew Morgan	6 ft 10 in (2.08 m)	235 lb (107 kg)	Fr	Waseca High School	Waseca, MN
G	33	Kolbe Rada	6 ft 1 in (1.85 m)	185 lb (84 kg)	Fr	Pius X Catholic High School	Ceresco, NE
F	34	Rocky Kreuser	6 ft 10 in (2.08 m)	245 lb (111 kg)	Sr	Totino-Grace High School	White Bear Lake, MN

Head coach

- David Richman (North Dakota State)

Assistant coach(es)

- Kyan Brown (Oral Roberts)
- Joshua Jones (Eastern Kentucky)
- Josh Sash (William Penn)

Legend

- (C) Team captain
- (S) Suspended
- (I) Ineligible
- (W) Walk-on
- Injured
- Current redshirt

Roster
Last update: December 19, 2021

== Offseason ==
=== Departures ===
Name	Number	Pos.	Height	Weight	Year	Hometown	Reason for departure
Jaxon Knotek	0	G	6'6"	215	Junior	River Falls, Wisconsin	Transferred to American
Donald Carter III	25	G	6'0"	195	Junior	Minneapolis, Minnesota	Unknown Destination
Odell Wilson	32	F	6'6"	245	Sophomore	Minneapolis, Minnesota	Transferred to Missouri SW State (Division II)
Tyler Witz	44	F	6'9"	245	Senior	Clearwater, Florida	Transferred to Saginaw Valley State (Division II)

=== Incoming transfers ===
Name	Number	Pos.	Height	Weight	Year	Hometown	Previous School
Willie Guy	2	G	5'11"	190	Sophomore	Cedar Rapids, Iowa	Des Moines Area Community College
Andrew Kallman	12	G	6'4"	190	Senior	Chaska, Minnesota	Northern State

=== Recruiting class ===
==== 2021 Recruiting Class ====
College recruiting information
Name	Hometown	School	Height	Weight	Commit date
Andrew Morgan; PF	Waseca, Minnesota	Waseca High School	6 ft 10 in (2.08 m)	235 lb (107 kg)	Oct 16, 2020
Andrew Morgan; PF	Recruit ratings: Scout: Rivals: 247Sports: ESPN: (0)				
Joshua Streit; PF	Watkins, Minnesota	Eden Valley-Watkins High School	6 ft 8 in (2.03 m)	200 lb (91 kg)	Jan 9, 2021
Joshua Streit; PF	Recruit ratings: Scout: Rivals: 247Sports: ESPN: (0)				
Kolbe Rada; G	Ceresco, Nebraska	Pius X Catholic High School	6 ft 1 in (1.85 m)	185 lb (84 kg)	Oct 9, 2020
Kolbe Rada; G	Recruit ratings: Scout: Rivals: 247Sports: ESPN: (0)				
Overall recruit ranking:
Note: In many cases, Scout, Rivals, 247Sports, On3, and ESPN may conflict in their listings of height and weight.; In these cases, the average was taken. ESPN grades are on a 100-point scale.; Sources: "2021 Team Ranking". Rivals.

== Schedule and results ==
Date time, TV	Rank^{#}	Opponent^{#}	Result	Record	Site (attendance) city, state
Exhibition
November 1, 2021*; 7:00 pm		Minot State	W 85–54	–	Scheels Center (1,158); Fargo, ND
Non-conference regular season
November 9, 2021*; 7:00 pm, WDAY Xtra/ESPN3		Concordia–Moorhead	W 88–44	1–0	Scheels Center (1,606); Fargo, ND
November 12, 2021*; 4:00 pm, ESPN+		at Cal Poly	W 60–57	2–0	Mott Athletics Center (1,289); San Luis Obispo, CA
November 15, 2021*; 9:00 pm		at UNLV; Roman Main Event On-Campus Game	L 62–64	2–1	Thomas & Mack Center (4,381); Paradise, NV
November 16, 2021*; 8:00 pm, P12N		at Arizona; Roman Main Event On-Campus Game	L 45–97	2–2	McKale Center (12,059); Tucson, AZ
November 22, 2021*; 7:00 pm, WDAY Xtra/ESPN+		Tarleton State; Roman Main Event On-Campus Game	W 54–53	3–2	Scheels Center (1,673); Fargo, ND
November 27, 2021*; 7:00 pm, WDAY Xtra/ESPN+		Idaho	W 90–73	4–2	Scheels Center (1,896); Fargo, ND
November 30, 2021*; 8:00 pm, FS2		at Creighton	L 55–80	4–3	CHI Health Center Omaha (15,428); Omaha, NE
December 2, 2021*; 7:00 pm, WDAY Xtra/ESPN+		Northland	W 114–51	5–3	Scheels Center (1,003); Fargo, ND
December 7, 2021*; 8:00 pm, ESPN+		at Montana State	L 49–68	5–4	Brick Breeden Fieldhouse (2,669); Bozeman, MT
December 10, 2021*; 7:00 pm, WDAY Xtra/ESPN+		Cal State Northridge	W 68–54	6–4	Scheels Center (1,403); Fargo, ND
December 13, 2021*; 7:00 pm, WDAY Xtra/ESPN+		Indiana State	W 77–70	7–4	Scheels Center (1,434); Fargo, ND
December 17, 2021*; 9:00 pm		at Pacific	W 73–61	8–4	Alex G. Spanos Center (925); Stockton, CA
Summit League regular season
December 22, 2021; 7:00 pm, WDAY Xtra/ESPN+		North Dakota	W 86–76	9–4 (1–0)	Scheels Center (3,510); Fargo, ND
December 30, 2021; 7:00 pm, WDAY Xtra/ESPN+		South Dakota State	L 86–90	9–5 (1–1)	Scheels Center (3,408); Fargo, ND
January 8, 2022; 12:00 pm		at Omaha	W 71–67	10–5 (2–1)	Baxter Arena (1,185); Omaha, NE
January 10, 2022; 8:00 pm, Altitude 2		at Denver	W 87–69	11–5 (3–1)	Hamilton Gymnasium (526); Denver, CO
January 15, 2022; 1:00 pm, WDAY Xtra/ESPN+		Western Illinois	L 79–90 ^{OT}	11–6 (3–2)	Scheels Center (1,634); Fargo, ND
January 20, 2022; 7:00 pm		at Kansas City	L 77–80	11–7 (3–3)	Swinney Recreation Center (631); Kansas City, MO
January 22, 2022; 7:00 pm		at Oral Roberts	W 72–71	12–7 (4–3)	Mabee Center (4,233); Tulsa, OK
January 25, 2022; 7:00 pm, WDAY Xtra/ESPN+		St. Thomas; Rescheduled from January 13	W 77–56	13–7 (5–3)	Scheels Center (1,290); Fargo, ND
January 27, 2022; 7:00 pm		at South Dakota	W 74–62 ^{OT}	14–7 (6–3)	Sanford Coyote Sports Center (1,837); Vermillion, SD
January 29, 2022; 2:00 pm, MidcoSN2/ESPN+		at South Dakota State	L 76–80	14–8 (6–4)	Frost Arena (3,821); Brookings, SD
February 3, 2022; 7:00 pm, WDAY Xtra/ESPN+		Omaha	W 71–64	15–8 (7–4)	Scheels Center (1,356); Fargo, ND
February 5, 2022; 1:00 pm, WDAY Xtra/ESPN+		Denver	W 73–65	16–8 (8–4)	Scheels Center (1,860); Fargo, ND
February 7, 2022; 7:00 pm, WDAY Xtra/ESPN+		South Dakota; Rescheduled from January 1	W 76–74	17–8 (9–4)	Scheels Center (1,343); Fargo, ND
February 10, 2022; 6:00 pm, ESPN+		at Western Illinois	W 84–81 ^{2OT}	18–8 (10–4)	Western Hall (798); Macomb, IL
February 12, 2022; 7:00 pm		at St. Thomas	W 75–64	19–8 (11–4)	Schoenecker Arena (1,405); St. Paul, MN
February 17, 2022; 7:00 pm, WDAY Xtra/ESPN+		Oral Roberts	W 77–59	20–8 (12–4)	Scheels Center (2,601); Fargo, ND
February 19, 2022; 1:00 pm, WDAY Xtra/ESPN+		Kansas City	L 71–85	20–9 (12–5)	Scheels Center (2,683); Fargo, ND
February 26, 2022; 1:00 pm, MidcoSN2/ESPN+		at North Dakota	W 79–53	21–9 (13–5)	Betty Engelstad Sioux Center (2,541); Grand Forks, ND
Summit League tournament
March 5, 2022; 8:30 pm, MidcoSN/ESPN+	(2)	vs. (7) Denver; Quarterfinals	W 82–62	22–9	Denny Sanford Premier Center (9,336); Sioux Falls, SD
March 7, 2022; 8:30 pm, MidcoSN/ESPN+	(2)	vs. (3) Oral Roberts; Semifinals	W 92–72	23–9	Denny Sanford Premier Center (10,418); Sioux Falls, SD
March 8, 2022; 8:00 pm, ESPN2	(2)	vs. (1) South Dakota State; Championship	L 69–75	23–10	Denny Sanford Premier Center (10,072); Sioux Falls, SD
*Non-conference game. ^{#}Rankings from AP Poll. (#) Tournament seedings in parentheses. All times are in Central.

== Season Honors ==
=== First-Team All-Summit League ===
- Rocky Kreuser
- Sam Griesel

=== Summit League All-Defensive Team ===
- Tyree Eady

=== Summit League All-Tournament Team ===
- Sam Griesel
- Grant Nelson
