= 2021–22 South Dakota Coyotes men's basketball team =

American college basketball season

2021–22 South Dakota Coyotes men's basketball
- Conference: Summit League
- Record: 19–12 (11–7 The Summit)
- Head coach: Todd Lee (4th season)
- Assistant coaches: Eddie Hill; Casey Kasperbauer; Roman Gentry
- Home arena: Sanford Coyote Sports Center

2021–22 Summit League men's basketball standings
	Conf.				Overall
Team	W		L	PCT	W		L	PCT
South Dakota State †	18	–	0	1.000	30	–	5	.857
North Dakota State	13	–	5	.722	23	–	10	.697
Kansas City	12	–	6	.667	19	–	12	.613
Oral Roberts	12	–	6	.667	19	–	12	.613
South Dakota	11	–	7	.611	19	–	12	.613
Western Illinois	7	–	11	.389	16	–	16	.500
Denver	7	–	11	.389	11	–	21	.344
St. Thomas *	4	–	14	.222	10	–	20	.333
Omaha	4	–	14	.222	5	–	25	.167
North Dakota	2	–	16	.111	6	–	25	.194
† 2022 Summit League tournament winner * Ineligible for the 2022 NCAA tournament due to transition from Division III

The 2021–22 South Dakota Coyotes men's basketball team represented the University of South Dakota in the 2021–22 NCAA Division I men's basketball season. The Coyotes, led by fourth-year head coach Todd Lee, played their home games at the Sanford Coyote Sports Center in Vermillion, South Dakota as members of the Summit League. They finished the season 19–12, 11–7 in Summit League play to finish in fifth place. They defeated Kansas City in the quarterfinals of the Summit League tournament before losing to South Dakota State in the semifinals.

On March 10, 2022, the school fired head coach Todd Lee after four years. On March 15, the school named Utah State assistant Eric Peterson the team's new head coach.

== Previous season ==
In a season limited due to the ongoing COVID-19 pandemic, the Coyotes finished the 2020–21 season 14–11, 11–4 in Summit League play to finish in second place. As the No. 2 seed in the Summit League tournament, they defeated Western Illinois in the quarterfinals, before falling to North Dakota State in the semifinals.

== Roster ==
2021–22 South Dakota Coyotes men's basketball team
Players
Coaches

Pos.	#	Name	Height	Weight	Year	Hometown
G	0	Boogie Anderson	6 ft 3 in (1.91 m)	200 lb (91 kg)	Sr	Chandler, AZ
G	2	Ty Walker	6 ft 0 in (1.83 m)	—	Fr	Des Moines, IA
G	3	Xavier Fuller	6 ft 4 in (1.93 m)	170 lb (77 kg)	Sr	Mesa, AZ
G	5	Kruz Perrott-Hunt	6 ft 3 in (1.91 m)	195 lb (88 kg)	Jr	Auckland, New Zealand
G	10	A.J. Plitzuweit	6 ft 2 in (1.88 m)	170 lb (77 kg)	Jr	Vermillion, SD
G	11	Mason Archambault	6 ft 0 in (1.83 m)	188 lb (85 kg)	Sr	Rapid City, SD
F	12	Hunter Goodrick	6 ft 7 in (2.01 m)	215 lb (98 kg)	RS So	Sydney, Australia
F	13	Graham Cassoutt	6 ft 7 in (2.01 m)	—	Fr	Papillion, NE
G	15	Keaton Kutcher	6 ft 2 in (1.88 m)	—	Fr	Mount Vernon, IA
G	20	Max Burchill	6 ft 4 in (1.93 m)	200 lb (91 kg)	So	Sioux Falls, SD
G	22	Erik Oliver	6 ft 1 in (1.85 m)	—	Jr	Cheyenne, WY
G	24	Kanon Koster	6 ft 4 in (1.93 m)	220 lb (100 kg)	Jr	Kearney, NE
G	25	Damani Hayes	6 ft 4 in (1.93 m)	223 lb (101 kg)	Sr	Mankato, MN
F	32	Nikola Zizic	6 ft 11 in (2.11 m)	238 lb (108 kg)	So	Podgorica, Montenegro
F	34	Tasos Kamateros	6 ft 8 in (2.03 m)	240 lb (109 kg)	Jr	Athens, Greece
F	45	Brady Heiman	6 ft 11 in (2.11 m)	210 lb (95 kg)	Jr	Springfield, NE

Head coach

- Todd Lee (South Dakota)

Assistant coach(es)

- Eddie Hill (Washington State)
- Casey Kasperbauer (South Dakota)
- Roman Gentry (South Dakota)

Legend

- (C) Team captain
- (S) Suspended
- (I) Ineligible
- (W) Walk-on
- Injured
- Current redshirt

Roster
Last update: November 30, 2021

== Schedule and results ==
Date time, TV	Rank^{#}	Opponent^{#}	Result	Record	Site (attendance) city, state
Exhibition
November 4, 2021*; 7:00 pm		Simpson	W 98–47	–	Sanford Coyote Sports Center (792); Vermillion, SD
Non-conference regular season
November 11, 2021*; 1:30 pm, MidcoSN/ESPN+		vs. Air Force	W 59–53	1–0	Sanford Pentagon (1,854); Sioux Falls, SD
November 14, 2021*; 2:00 pm, MC22/ESPN+		at Drake	L 50–99	1–1	Knapp Center (2,827); Des Moines, IA
November 19, 2021*; 7:00 pm		Southern	W 71–68	2–1	Sanford Coyote Sports Center (1,130); Vermillion, SD
November 21, 2021*; 2:00 pm		Tennessee State	W 83–66	3–1	Sanford Coyote Sports Center (847); Vermillion, SD
November 23, 2021*; 7:00 pm		Presentation	W 99–58	4–1	Sanford Coyote Sports Center (795); Vermillion, SD
November 27, 2021*; 1:00 pm, BTN+		at Nebraska	L 70–83	4–2	Pinnacle Bank Arena (15,685); Lincoln, NE
November 30, 2021*; 9:00 pm		at San Jose State	L 52–61	4–3	Provident Credit Union Event Center (1,181); San Jose, CA
December 3, 2021*; 7:00 pm		Waldorf	W 93–37	5–3	Sanford Coyote Sports Center (859); Vermillion, SD
December 7, 2021*; 1:00 pm, ESPN+		at Northern Colorado	L 69–74	5–4	Bank of Colorado Arena (1,115); Greeley, CO
December 11, 2021*; 3:30 pm		Northern Arizona	W 76–71 ^{OT}	6–4	Sanford Coyote Sports Center (1,832); Vermillion, SD
December 15, 2021*; 7:00 pm		Bellarmine	W 78–64	7–4	Sanford Coyote Sports Center (753); Vermillion, SD
Summit League regular season
December 20, 2021; 7:00 pm, MidcoSN/ESPN+		Oral Roberts	L 73–82	7–5 (0–1)	Sanford Coyote Sports Center (1,516); Vermillion, SD
December 22, 2021; 7:00 pm		Kansas City	L 57–68	7–6 (0–2)	Sanford Coyote Sports Center (1,635); Vermillion, SD
December 30, 2021; 7:00 pm		at North Dakota	Postponed due to COVID-19 protocols		Betty Engelstad Sioux Center; Grand Forks, ND
January 1, 2022; 1:00 pm, WDAY Xtra/ESPN+		at North Dakota State	Postponed due to COVID-19 protocols		Scheels Center; Fargo, ND
January 8, 2022; 6:00 pm, MidcoSN2/ESPN+		at South Dakota State	L 65–84	7–7 (0–3)	Frost Arena (3,351); Brookings, SD
January 10, 2022; 7:00 pm, ESPN+		at North Dakota; Rescheduled from December 30	W 75–68	8–7 (1–3)	Betty Engelstad Sioux Center (1,207); Grand Forks, ND
January 13, 2022; 7:00 pm, MidcoSN/ESPN+		Denver	W 80–71	9–7 (2–3)	Sanford Coyote Sports Center (1,090); Vermillion, SD
January 15, 2022; 4:00 pm, MidcoSN2/ESPN+		Omaha	W 105–70	10–7 (3–3)	Sanford Coyote Sports Center (1,669); Vermillion, SD
January 20, 2022; 7:00 pm		at Western Illinois	Postponed due to COVID-19 protocols		Western Hall; Macomb, IL
January 22, 2022; 7:00 pm		at St. Thomas	W 90–79	11–7 (4–3)	Schoenecker Arena (746); St. Paul, MN
January 24, 2022; 6:00 pm		at Western Illinois; Rescheduled from January 20	W 75–72	12–7 (5–3)	Western Hall; Macomb, IL
January 27, 2022; 7:00 pm		North Dakota State	L 62–74 ^{OT}	12–8 (5–4)	Sanford Coyote Sports Center (1,837); Vermillion, SD
January 29, 2022; 4:00 pm		North Dakota	W 71–58	13–8 (6–4)	Sanford Coyote Sports Center (2,112); Vermillion, SD
February 5, 2022; 7:00 pm, MidcoSN/ESPN+		South Dakota State	L 79–89	13–9 (6–5)	Sanford Coyote Sports Center (4,224); Vermillion, SD
February 7, 2022; 7:00 pm, WDAY Xtra/ESPN+		at North Dakota State; Rescheduled from January 1	L 74–76	13–10 (6–6)	Scheels Center (1,343); Fargo, ND
February 10, 2022; 7:00 pm		at Omaha	W 91–69	14–10 (7–6)	Baxter Arena (1,198); Omaha, NE
February 12, 2022; 3:00 pm		at Denver	W 84–76	15–10 (8–6)	Hamilton Gymnasium (1,229); Denver, CO
February 17, 2022; 7:00 pm, MidcoSN/ESPN+		St. Thomas	W 81–60	16–10 (9–6)	Sanford Coyote Sports Center (1,770); Vermillion, SD
February 19, 2022; 4:00 pm, MidcoSN2/ESPN+		Western Illinois	W 78–65	17–10 (10–6)	Sanford Coyote Sports Center (2,814); Vermillion, SD
February 24, 2022; 7:00 pm		at Kansas City	L 63–72	17–11 (10–7)	Swinney Recreation Center (1,046); Kansas City, MO
February 26, 2022; 7:00 pm, ORUSN		at Oral Roberts	W 92–87	18–11 (11–7)	Mabee Center (5,364); Tulsa, OK
Summit League tournament
March 6, 2022; 6:00 pm, ESPN+	(5)	vs. (4) Kansas City; Quarterfinals	W 74–61	19–11	Denny Sanford Premier Center (7,364); Sioux Falls, SD
March 7, 2022; 6:00 pm, ESPN+	(5)	vs. (1) South Dakota State; Semifinals	L 60–83	19–12	Denny Sanford Premier Center (10,418); Sioux Falls, SD
*Non-conference game. ^{#}Rankings from AP Poll. (#) Tournament seedings in parentheses. All times are in Central.
