= 2021–22 Oral Roberts Golden Eagles men's basketball team =

American college basketball season

2021–22 Oral Roberts Golden Eagles men's basketball
- Conference: Summit League
- Record: 19–12 (12–6 The Summit)
- Head coach: Paul Mills (5th season)
- Assistant coaches: Sam Patterson; Russell Springmann; Kenton Paulino
- Home arena: Mabee Center

2021–22 Summit League men's basketball standings
	Conf.				Overall
Team	W		L	PCT	W		L	PCT
South Dakota State †	18	–	0	1.000	30	–	5	.857
North Dakota State	13	–	5	.722	23	–	10	.697
Kansas City	12	–	6	.667	19	–	12	.613
Oral Roberts	12	–	6	.667	19	–	12	.613
South Dakota	11	–	7	.611	19	–	12	.613
Western Illinois	7	–	11	.389	16	–	16	.500
Denver	7	–	11	.389	11	–	21	.344
St. Thomas *	4	–	14	.222	10	–	20	.333
Omaha	4	–	14	.222	5	–	25	.167
North Dakota	2	–	16	.111	6	–	25	.194
† 2022 Summit League tournament winner * Ineligible for the 2022 NCAA tournament due to transition from Division III

The 2021–22 Oral Roberts Golden Eagles men's basketball team represented Oral Roberts University in the 2021–22 NCAA Division I men's basketball season. The Golden Eagles, led by fifth-year head coach Paul Mills, played their home games at the Mabee Center in Tulsa, Oklahoma, as members of the Summit League.

== Previous season ==
In a season limited due to the ongoing COVID-19 pandemic, the Golden Eagles finished the 2020–21 season 18–11, 10–5 in Summit League play to finish in fourth place. In the Summit League tournament, they defeated North Dakotas and top-seeded South Dakota State to advance to the championship game. There they defeated North Dakota State to win the tournament championship. As a result, they received the conference's automatic bid to the NCAA tournament as the No. 15 seed in the South region, the school's first appearance since 2008. In the First Round, they upset No. 2-seeded Ohio State in overtime, becoming the first No. 15 seed since 2016, and just the ninth overall, to win a first-round game. In the Second Round, they defeated Florida, becoming just the second No. 15 seed to advance to the Sweet 16, the other being Florida Gulf Coast in 2013. In the Sweet 16, they matched up against Arkansas for their second meeting of the season, having played each other in the regular season, an Arkansas win. After a potential game-winning three missed at the buzzer, Arkansas came away with the win, preventing Oral Roberts from becoming the first-ever No. 15 to advance to the Elite Eight.

== Roster ==
2021–22 Oral Roberts Golden Eagles men's basketball team
Players
Coaches

Pos.	#	Name	Height	Weight	Year	Hometown
F/C	1	Elijah Lufile	6 ft 7 in (2.01 m)	280 lb (127 kg)	RS Sr	Milton, Ontario, Canada
G	2	Kareem Thompson	6 ft 5 in (1.96 m)	200 lb (91 kg)	Jr	Florence, Alabama
G	3	Max Abmas	6 ft 0 in (1.83 m)	174 lb (79 kg)	Jr	Rockwall, Texas
G	4	Jamie Bergens	6 ft 2 in (1.88 m)	180 lb (82 kg)	So	Almere, Netherlands
G	5	Jonathan Alexandre	6 ft 5 in (1.96 m)	195 lb (88 kg)	So	Pétion-Ville, Haiti
G	10	Issac McBride	6 ft 0 in (1.83 m)	175 lb (79 kg)	So	Little Rock, Arkansas
G	11	Carlos Jürgens	6 ft 4 in (1.93 m)	200 lb (91 kg)	RS Jr	Tartu, Estonia
C	13	Nate Clover III	6 ft 8 in (2.03 m)	240 lb (109 kg)	So	Port Arthur, Texas
F	14	DeShang Weaver	6 ft 7 in (2.01 m)	205 lb (93 kg)	RS Jr	Houston, Texas
G	20	Trey Phipps	6 ft 2 in (1.88 m)	180 lb (82 kg)	So	Tulsa, Oklahoma
F	22	Francis Lacis	6 ft 7 in (2.01 m)	220 lb (100 kg)	Sr	Riga, Latvia
F	23	Sir Issac Herron	6 ft 9 in (2.06 m)	210 lb (95 kg)	Fr	Houston, Texas
G	25	Elijah Lawrence	5 ft 10 in (1.78 m)	160 lb (73 kg)	Fr	Bellaire, Texas
F	33	Luka Tekavcic	6 ft 11 in (2.11 m)	200 lb (91 kg)	Fr	Grosuplje, Slovenia
F	45	Ismael Plet	6 ft 7 in (2.01 m)	230 lb (104 kg)	So	Amsterdam, Netherlands

Head coach

- Paul Mills (Texas A&M)

Assistant coach(es)

- Sam Patterson (Baylor)
- Russell Springmann (Salisbury)
- Kenton Paulino (Texas)

Legend

- (C) Team captain
- (S) Suspended
- (I) Ineligible
- (W) Walk-on
- Injured
- Current redshirt

Roster
Last update: December 17, 2021

== Schedule and results ==
Date time, TV	Rank^{#}	Opponent^{#}	Result	Record	Site (attendance) city, state
Non-conference regular season
November 9, 2021*; 8:30 pm, Stadium		at Colorado State	L 80–109	0–1	Moby Arena (7,287); Fort Collins, CO
November 12, 2021*; 7:00 pm, ORUSN		Southwestern Christian	W 121–50	1–1	Mabee Center (3,714); Tulsa, OK
November 18, 2021*; 7:00 pm, ORUSN		Haskell	W 89–46	2–1	Mabee Center (3,112); Tulsa, OK
November 20, 2021*; 3:15 pm, ORUSN		at Central Arkansas	L 67–70	2–2	Farris Center (685); Conway, AR
November 23, 2021*; 7:00 pm, ORUSN		Rogers State	W 91–31	3–2	Mabee Center (2,974); Tulsa, OK
November 26, 2021*; 3:00 pm, ORUSN		Oklahoma State	L 77–78 ^{OT}	3–3	Mabee Center (6,094); Tulsa, OK
November 29, 2021*; 7:00 pm, ORUSN		Tulsa; PSO Mayor's Cup	W 87–80	4–3	Mabee Center (1,016); Tulsa, OK
December 2, 2021*; 7:00 pm, Big 12 Now		at TCU	L 63–71	4–4	Schollmaier Arena (5,023); Fort Worth, TX
December 4, 2021*; 7:00 pm		at Houston Baptist	W 85–67	5–4	Sharp Gymnasium (1,000); Houston, TX
December 11, 2021*; 3:00 pm, ESPN3		at Missouri State	L 60–69	5–5	JQH Arena (4,002); Springfield, MO
December 16, 2021*; 7:00 pm, ORUSN		UT Arlington	W 71–62	6–5	Mabee Center (3,238); Tulsa, OK
Summit League regular season
December 20, 2021; 7:00 pm, MidcoSN/ESPN+		at South Dakota	W 82–73	7–5 (1–0)	Sanford Coyote Sports Center (1,516); Vermillion, SD
December 22, 2021; 7:00 pm, MidcoSN/ESPN+		at South Dakota State	L 76–82	7–6 (1–1)	Frost Arena (1,955); Brookings, SD
December 30, 2021; 7:00 pm, ORUSN		Denver	W 83–66	8–6 (2–1)	Mabee Center (2,896); Tulsa, OK
January 1, 2022; 7:00 pm, ORUSN		Omaha	W 107–62	9–6 (3–1)	Mabee Center (2,136); Tulsa, OK
January 6, 2022; 7:00 pm		at St. Thomas	W 81–66	10–6 (4–1)	Schoenecker Arena (1,241); St. Paul, MN
January 8, 2022; 2:00 pm		at Western Illinois	W 87–86	11–6 (5–1)	Western Hall (1,022); Macomb, IL
January 15, 2022; 7:00 pm		at Kansas City	W 84–72	12–6 (6–1)	Swinney Recreation Center (766); Kansas City, MO
January 20, 2022; 7:00 pm, ORUSN		North Dakota	W 80–76	13–6 (7–1)	Mabee Center (3,819); Tulsa, OK
January 22, 2022; 7:00 pm, ORUSN		North Dakota State	L 71–72	13–7 (7–2)	Mabee Center (4,233); Tulsa, OK
January 27, 2022; 7:00 pm		at Omaha	W 100–88	14–7 (8–2)	Baxter Arena (1,688); Omaha, NE
January 29, 2022; 3:00 pm		at Denver	W 89–80	15–7 (9–2)	Hamilton Gymnasium (839); Denver, CO
February 3, 2022; 7:00 pm, ORUSN		Western Illinois	L 85–90	15–8 (9–3)	Mabee Center (4,136); Tulsa, OK
February 5, 2022; 7:00 pm, ORUSN		St. Thomas	W 88–66	16–8 (10–3)	Mabee Center (4,412); Tulsa, OK
February 12, 2022; 7:00 pm, ORUSN		Kansas City	W 91–86	17–8 (11–3)	Mabee Center (4,453); Tulsa, OK
February 17, 2022; 7:00 pm, ESPN+		at North Dakota State	L 59–77	17–9 (11–4)	Scheels Center (2,601); Fargo, ND
February 19, 2022; 1:00 pm		at North Dakota	W 87–73	18–9 (12–4)	Betty Engelstad Sioux Center (1,400); Grand Forks, ND
February 24, 2022; 7:00 pm, ORUSN		South Dakota State	L 102–106 ^{OT}	18–10 (12–5)	Mabee Center (4,894); Tulsa, OK
February 26, 2022; 7:00 pm, ORUSN		South Dakota	L 87–92	18–11 (12–6)	Mabee Center (5,364); Tulsa, OK
Summit League tournament
March 6, 2022; 8:30 pm, ESPN+	(3)	vs. (6) Western Illinois; Quarterfinals	W 80–68	19–11	Denny Sanford Premier Center (7,364); Sioux Falls, SD
March 7, 2022; 8:30 pm, ESPN+	(3)	vs. (2) North Dakota State; Semifinals	L 72–92	19–12	Denny Sanford Premier Center (10,418); Sioux Falls, SD
*Non-conference game. ^{#}Rankings from AP Poll. (#) Tournament seedings in parentheses. All times are in Central.
