= 2021–22 Western Illinois Leathernecks men's basketball team =

American college basketball season

2021–22 Western Illinois Leathernecks men's basketball

The Basketball Classic, first round
- Conference: Summit League
- Record: 16–16 (7–11 The Summit)
- Head coach: Rob Jeter (2nd season)
- Associate head coach: Chad Boudreau
- Assistant coaches: Kyle Heikkinen; Nick Irvin
- Home arena: Western Hall

2021–22 Summit League men's basketball standings
	Conf.				Overall
Team	W		L	PCT	W		L	PCT
South Dakota State †	18	–	0	1.000	30	–	5	.857
North Dakota State	13	–	5	.722	23	–	10	.697
Kansas City	12	–	6	.667	19	–	12	.613
Oral Roberts	12	–	6	.667	19	–	12	.613
South Dakota	11	–	7	.611	19	–	12	.613
Western Illinois	7	–	11	.389	16	–	16	.500
Denver	7	–	11	.389	11	–	21	.344
St. Thomas *	4	–	14	.222	10	–	20	.333
Omaha	4	–	14	.222	5	–	25	.167
North Dakota	2	–	16	.111	6	–	25	.194
† 2022 Summit League tournament winner * Ineligible for the 2022 NCAA tournament due to transition from Division III

The 2021–22 Western Illinois Leathernecks men's basketball team represented Western Illinois University in the 2021–22 NCAA Division I men's basketball season. The Leathernecks, led by second-year head coach Rob Jeter, played their home games at Western Hall in Macomb, Illinois, as members of the Summit League. They finished the regular season 16–15, 7–11 in Summit League play, to finish in a tie for sixth place. As the No. 6 seed in the Summit League tournament, they lost to Oral Roberts in the quarterfinals. They received an invitation to The Basketball Classic postseason tournament, formerly known as the CollegeInsider.com Tournament.

== Previous season ==
In a season limited due to the ongoing COVID-19 pandemic, the Leathernecks finished the 2020–21 season 7–15, 5–9 in Summit League play, to finish in seventh place. They lost to South Dakota in the quarterfinals of the Summit League tournament.

== Roster ==
2021–22 Western Illinois Leathernecks men's basketball team
Players
Coaches

Pos.	#	Name	Height	Weight	Year	Previous school	Hometown
G	1	Quinlan Bennett	6 ft 4 in (1.93 m)	190 lb (86 kg)	Jr	Lamar	Chicago, IL
F	2	Tamell Pearson	6 ft 10 in (2.08 m)	223 lb (101 kg)	Jr	UAB	Chicago, IL
F	3	Cameron Burrell	6 ft 7 in (2.01 m)	175 lb (79 kg)	Jr	Highland CC	Chicago, IL
G	5	Trenton Massner	6 ft 2 in (1.88 m)	175 lb (79 kg)	Jr	Northwestern State	Wapello, IA
G	11	Jadrian Flores	6 ft 3 in (1.91 m)	180 lb (82 kg)	Jr	Highland CC	Lake in the Hills, IL
F	12	Adam Anhold	6 ft 8 in (2.03 m)	240 lb (109 kg)	Jr	Highland CC	Janesville, WI
G	13	Braden Lamar	6 ft 5 in (1.96 m)	190 lb (86 kg)	Fr	Bishop Gorman HS	Las Vegas, NV
G	15	Colton Sandage	6 ft 2 in (1.88 m)	190 lb (86 kg)	Jr	Vincennes	Bloomington, IL
G	21	Robert IV Jeter	6 ft 0 in (1.83 m)	180 lb (82 kg)	Fr	East Ridge HS	Woodbury, MN
G	22	KJ Lee	6 ft 8 in (2.03 m)	170 lb (77 kg)	Fr	Fort Zumwalt North HS	O'Fallon, MO
F	23	Ramean Hinton	6 ft 5 in (1.96 m)	180 lb (82 kg)	Fr	Curie HS	Chicago, IL
G	24	George Dixon	6 ft 5 in (1.96 m)	230 lb (104 kg)	Sr	Eastern Illinois	Milwaukee, WI
F	25	Will Carius	6 ft 7 in (2.01 m)	225 lb (102 kg)	GS	Monmouth College	Bettendorf, IA
G	40	Matthew Wade	6 ft 0 in (1.83 m)	160 lb (73 kg)	Fr	Golda Meir School	Milwaukee, WI
F	44	Luka Barisic	6 ft 10 in (2.08 m)	240 lb (109 kg)	GS	UTSA	Osijek, Croatia

Head coach

- Rob Jeter (UW–Platteville)

Assistant coach(es)

- Chad Boudreau (Hannibal–LaGrange)
- Kyle Heikkinen (UW–Whitewater)
- Nick Irvin (Fresno State)

Legend

- (C) Team captain
- (S) Suspended
- (I) Ineligible
- (W) Walk-on
- Injured
- Current redshirt

Roster
Last update: November 5, 2021

== Schedule and results ==
Date time, TV	Rank^{#}	Opponent^{#}	Result	Record	Site (attendance) city, state
Exhibition
October 27, 2021*; 6:00 p.m.		Illinois–Springfield	W 92–80	–	Western Hall (1,050); Macomb, IL
November 1, 2021*; 6:00 p.m.		Monmouth College	W 88–34	–	Western Hall (500); Macomb, IL
Regular season
November 9, 2021*; 7:00 p.m., BTN+		at Nebraska	W 75–74	1–0	Pinnacle Bank Arena (15,312); Lincoln, NE
November 12, 2021*; 6:00 p.m.		Culver–Stockton	W 91–69	2–0	Western Hall (940); Macomb, IL
November 16, 2021*; 6:00 p.m.		Iowa Wesleyan	W 97–71	3–0	Western Hall (1,500); Macomb, IL
November 20, 2021*; 7:00 p.m., FS2		at DePaul	L 80–84	3–1	Wintrust Arena (2,642); Chicago, IL
November 22, 2021*; 6:00 p.m., ESPN+		at Northern Kentucky	W 69–67	4–1	BB&T Arena (2,065); Highland Heights, KY
November 24, 2021*; 2:00 p.m., ESPN3		at Eastern Michigan	L 68–72	4–2	George Gervin GameAbove Center (1,145); Ypsilanti, MI
November 27, 2021*; 2:00 p.m.		Miami (OH)	W 79–67	5–2	Western Hall (506); Macomb, IL
December 1, 2021*; 6:00 p.m.		Ball State	W 93–80	6–2	Western Hall (998); Macomb, IL
December 4, 2021*; 1:00 p.m.		UT Martin	W 81–64	7–2	Western Hall; Macomb, IL
December 5, 2021*; 1:00 p.m., ESPN3		at Central Michigan	W 97–70	8–2	McGuirk Arena (1,299); Mount Pleasant, MI
December 18, 2021*; 2:00 p.m.		Eastern Illinois	W 71–54	9–2	Western Hall (1,004); Macomb, IL
December 20, 2021; 8:00 p.m.		at Denver	W 84–80 ^{OT}	10–2 (1–0)	Hamilton Gymnasium (682); Denver, CO
December 22, 2021; 7:00 p.m.		at Omaha	L 78–84	10–3 (1–1)	Baxter Arena (1,430); Omaha, NE
December 29, 2021*; 7:00 p.m.		at Iowa	L 71–92	10–4	Carver–Hawkeye Arena (15,056); Iowa City, IA
January 1, 2022; 7:00 p.m.		at St. Thomas	L 66–89	10–5 (1–2)	Schoenecker Arena (797); St. Paul, MN
January 6, 2022; 6:00 p.m.		Kansas City	Postponed due to COVID-19 issues		Western Hall; Macomb, IL
January 8, 2022; 2:00 p.m.		Oral Roberts	L 86–87	10–6 (1–3)	Western Hall (1,022); Macomb, IL
January 13, 2022; 7:00 p.m., ESPN+		at North Dakota	W 73–68	11–6 (2–3)	Betty Engelstad Sioux Center (1,258); Grand Forks, ND
January 15, 2022; 1:00 p.m., ESPN+		at North Dakota State	W 90–79 ^{OT}	12–6 (3–3)	Scheels Center (1,634); Fargo, ND
January 20, 2022; 6:00 p.m.		South Dakota	Postponed due to COVID-19 issues		Western Hall; Macomb, IL
January 22, 2022; 2:00 p.m.		South Dakota State	L 75–93	12–7 (3–4)	Western Hall (1,206); Macomb, IL
January 24, 2022; 6:00 p.m.		South Dakota; Rescheduled from January 20	L 72–75	12–8 (3–5)	Western Hall; Macomb, IL
January 29, 2022; 2:00 p.m.		St. Thomas	W 81–52	13–8 (4–5)	Western Hall (589); Macomb, IL
January 31, 2022; 6:00 p.m.		Kansas City; Rescheduled from January 6	L 75–83	13–9 (4–6)	Western Hall (633); Macomb, IL
February 3, 2022; 7:00 p.m.		at Oral Roberts	W 90–85	14–9 (5–6)	Mabee Center (4,136); Tulsa, OK
February 5, 2022; 7:00 p.m.		at Kansas City	L 82–91	14–10 (5–7)	Swinney Recreation Center (876); Kansas City, MO
February 10, 2022; 6:00 p.m., ESPN+		North Dakota State	L 81–84 ^{2OT}	14–11 (5–8)	Western Hall (789); Macomb, IL
February 12, 2022; 2:00 p.m., ESPN3		North Dakota	W 70–68	15–11 (6–8)	Western Hall (827); Macomb, IL
February 17, 2022; 7:00 p.m., ESPN+		at South Dakota State	L 66–91	15–12 (6–9)	Frost Arena (3,345); Brookings, SD
February 19, 2022; 4:00 p.m., ESPN3		at South Dakota	L 65–78	15–13 (6–10)	Sanford Coyote Sports Center (2,814); Vermillion, SD
February 24, 2022; 6:00 p.m., ESPN+		Omaha	W 88–76	16–13 (7–10)	Western Hall (621); Macomb, IL
February 26, 2022; 2:00 p.m., ESPN3		Denver	L 77–83	16–14 (7–11)	Western Hall; Macomb, IL
Summit League tournament
March 6, 2022; 8:30 p.m., ESPN+	(6)	vs. (3) Oral Roberts; Quarterfinals	L 68–80	16–15	Denny Sanford Premier Center (7,364); Sioux Falls, SD
The Basketball Classic
March 19, 2022; 2:00 p.m., ESPN+		at UTEP; First round	L 54–80	16–16	Don Haskins Center (3,500); El Paso, TX
*Non-conference game. ^{#}Rankings from AP poll. (#) Tournament seedings in parentheses. All times are in Central.
