= 2021–22 Denver Pioneers men's basketball team =

American college basketball season

2021–22 Denver Pioneers men's basketball
- Conference: Summit League
- Record: 11–21 (7–11 The Summit)
- Head coach: Jeff Wulbrun (1st season)
- Associate head coach: Brandon Dunson
- Assistant coaches: Rob Zewe; Rob Williams
- Home arena: Hamilton Gymnasium

2021–22 Summit League men's basketball standings
	Conf.				Overall
Team	W		L	PCT	W		L	PCT
South Dakota State †	18	–	0	1.000	30	–	5	.857
North Dakota State	13	–	5	.722	23	–	10	.697
Kansas City	12	–	6	.667	19	–	12	.613
Oral Roberts	12	–	6	.667	19	–	12	.613
South Dakota	11	–	7	.611	19	–	12	.613
Western Illinois	7	–	11	.389	16	–	16	.500
Denver	7	–	11	.389	11	–	21	.344
St. Thomas *	4	–	14	.222	10	–	20	.333
Omaha	4	–	14	.222	5	–	25	.167
North Dakota	2	–	16	.111	6	–	25	.194
† 2022 Summit League tournament winner * Ineligible for the 2022 NCAA tournament due to transition from Division III

The 2021–22 Denver Pioneers men's basketball team represented the University of Denver in the 2021–22 NCAA Division I men's basketball season. The Pioneers, led by first-year head coach Jeff Wulbrun, played their home games at Hamilton Gymnasium in Denver, Colorado, as members of the Summit League.

== Previous season ==
In a season limited due to the ongoing COVID-19 pandemic, the Pioneers finished the 2020–21 season 2–19, 1–13 in Summit League play to finish in last place. They failed to qualify for the Summit League tournament.

On March 1, 2021, the school announced that there would be a "change in leadership," ending Rodney Billups' five-year tenure with the team. On March 29, it was announced that Stanford associate head coach Jeff Wulbrun would be the Pioneers' new head coach.

== Roster ==
2021–22 Denver Pioneers men's basketball team
Players
Coaches

Pos.	#	Name	Height	Weight	Year	Hometown
G	0	Payton Moore	6 ft 4 in (1.93 m)	215 lb (98 kg)	Jr	Los Angeles, CA
G	1	Tevin Smith	6 ft 5 in (1.96 m)	195 lb (88 kg)	Fr	Danville, IL
G	2	KJ Hunt	6 ft 3 in (1.91 m)	170 lb (77 kg)	Jr	Little Rock, AR
G	3	Korey Hess	5 ft 11 in (1.8 m)	160 lb (73 kg)	So	Centennial, CO
G	4	Taelyr Gatlin	6 ft 3 in (1.91 m)	180 lb (82 kg)	Sr	Jackson, MS
G	5	Coban Porter	6 ft 4 in (1.93 m)	200 lb (91 kg)	Fr	Columbia, MO
G	10	Drake Muller	6 ft 4 in (1.93 m)	195 lb (88 kg)	So	Cedar Hill, TX
G	11	Jordan Johnson	6 ft 1 in (1.85 m)	170 lb (77 kg)	So	Memphis, TN
F	13	Felipe Motta	6 ft 7 in (2.01 m)	196 lb (89 kg)	Fr	Brindisi, Italy
F	15	Pedro Lopez-Sanvicente	6 ft 8 in (2.03 m)	200 lb (91 kg)	Fr	Canary Islands, Spain
F	22	Tristan Green	6 ft 9 in (2.06 m)	220 lb (100 kg)	Sr	Boerne, TX
F	23	James Sanders IV	6 ft 3 in (1.91 m)	200 lb (91 kg)	Jr	Fountain, CO
F	24	Michael Henn	6 ft 8 in (2.03 m)	225 lb (102 kg)	Sr	Bellevue, WA
F	25	Touko Tainamo	6 ft 9 in (2.06 m)	210 lb (95 kg)	Fr	Helsinki, Finland
F	42	JaVonni Bickham	6 ft 6 in (1.98 m)	225 lb (102 kg)	Jr	Minneapolis, MN

Head coach

- Jeff Wulbrun (Cal State Fullerton)

Assistant coach(es)

- Brandon Dunson (Arizona State)
- Rob Zewe (Pittsburgh)
- Rob Williams (UAB)

Legend

- (C) Team captain
- (S) Suspended
- (I) Ineligible
- (W) Walk-on
- Injured
- Current redshirt

Roster
Last update: December 18, 2021

== Schedule and results ==
Date time, TV	Rank^{#}	Opponent^{#}	Result	Record	Site (attendance) city, state
Non-conference regular season
November 9, 2021*; 7:00 pm		Regis	W 68–65	1–0	Hamilton Gymnasium (1,607); Denver, CO
November 12, 2021*; 6:00 pm		Ottawa (AZ)	L 71–72	1–1	Hamilton Gymnasium (981); Denver, CO
November 15, 2021*; 4:00 pm		vs. IUPUI; UTSA Invitational	W 63–47	2–1	Convocation Center (197); San Antonio, TX
November 16, 2021*; 6:30 pm, CUSA TV		at UTSA; UTSA Invitational	L 64–78	2–2	Convocation Center (848); San Antonio, TX
November 17, 2021*; 12:00 pm		vs. Texas A&M–Corpus Christi; UTSA Invitational	L 67–69	2–3	Convocation Center (124); San Antonio, TX
November 21, 2021*; 2:00 pm		Houston Baptist	W 74–61	3–3	Hamilton Gymnasium (550); Denver, CO
November 24, 2021*; 2:00 pm, MWN		at Air Force	L 65–66	3–4	Clune Arena (1,076); Colorado Springs, CO
November 27, 2021*; 3:00 pm, ESPN+		at Utah Valley	L 68–77 ^{OT}	3–5	UCCU Center (1,386); Orem, UT
December 2, 2021*; 7:00 pm, MWN		at Wyoming	L 64–77	3–6	Arena-Auditorium (4,030); Laramie, WY
December 5, 2021*; 12:00 pm, ESPN+		at Texas State	L 58–71	3–7	Strahan Arena; San Marcos, TX
December 9, 2021*; 7:00 pm, MWN		at New Mexico	L 67–87	3–8	The Pit (8,046); Albuquerque, NM
December 11, 2021*; 7:00 pm, ESPN+		at Dixie State	L 62–82	3–9	Burns Arena (1,276); St. George, UT
December 15, 2021*; 7:00 pm, Altitude 2		UC San Diego	W 64–56	4–9	Hamilton Gymnasium (318); Denver, CO
Summit League regular season
December 20, 2021; 7:00 pm, Altitude		Western Illinois	L 80–84 ^{OT}	4–10 (0–1)	Hamilton Gymnasium (682); Denver, CO
December 22, 2021; 2:00 pm		St. Thomas	W 75–74	5–10 (1–1)	Hamilton Gymnasium (910); Denver, CO
December 30, 2021; 6:00 pm, ORSN		at Oral Roberts	L 66–83	5–11 (1–2)	Mabee Center (2,896); Tulsa, OK
January 8, 2022; 2:00 pm, Altitude 2		North Dakota	L 69–87	5–12 (1–3)	Hamilton Gymnasium (526); Denver, CO
January 10, 2022; 7:00 pm, Altitude 2		North Dakota State	W 93–74	6–12 (2–3)	Hamilton Gymnasium (727); Denver, CO
January 13, 2022; 6:00 pm, MidcoSN/ESPN+		at South Dakota	L 71–80	6–13 (2–4)	Sanford Coyote Sports Center (1,090); Vermillion, SD
January 15, 2022; 1:00 pm		at South Dakota State	L 62–80	6–14 (2–5)	Frost Arena (1,595); Brookings, SD
January 17, 2022; 6:00 pm		at Kansas City; Rescheduled from January 1	W 63–55	7–14 (3–5)	Swinney Recreation Center (495); Kansas City, MO
January 22, 2022; 2:00 pm		Omaha	W 94–63	8–14 (4–5)	Hamilton Gymnasium (695); Denver, CO
January 27, 2022; 7:00 pm, Altitude		Kansas City	L 61–72	8–15 (4–6)	Hamilton Gymnasium (474); Denver, CO
January 29, 2022; 2:00 pm		Oral Roberts	L 80–89	8–16 (4–7)	Hamilton Gymnasium (839); Denver, CO
February 3, 2022; 6:00 pm, MidcoSN/ESPN+		at North Dakota	W 81–79 ^{OT}	9–16 (5–7)	Betty Engelstad Sioux Center (1,296); Grand Forks, ND
February 5, 2022; 12:00 pm, ESPN+		at North Dakota State	L 65–73	9–17 (5–8)	Scheels Center (1,860); Fargo, ND
February 10, 2022; 7:00 pm, Altitude 2		South Dakota State	L 61–84	9–18 (5–9)	Hamilton Gymnasium (767); Denver, CO
February 12, 2022; 2:00 pm		South Dakota	L 76–84	9–19 (5–10)	Hamilton Gymnasium (1,229); Denver, CO
February 17, 2022; 6:00 pm		at Omaha	L 69–72	9–20 (5–11)	Baxter Arena (1,367); Omaha, NE
February 24, 2022; 6:00 pm		at St. Thomas	W 91–80	10–20 (6–11)	Schoenecker Arena (770); St. Paul, MN
February 26, 2022; 1:00 pm, ESPN3		at Western Illinois	W 83–77	11–20 (7–11)	Western Hall (0); Macomb, IL
Summit League tournament
March 5, 2022; 6:30 pm, ESPN+	(7)	vs. (2) North Dakota State; Quarterfinals	L 62–82	11–21	Denny Sanford Premier Center (9,336); Sioux Falls, SD
*Non-conference game. ^{#}Rankings from AP Poll. (#) Tournament seedings in parentheses. All times are in Mountain.
