= 2021–22 Omaha Mavericks men's basketball team =

American college basketball season

2021–22 Omaha Mavericks men's basketball
- Conference: Summit League
- Record: 5–25 (4–14 The Summit)
- Head coach: Derrin Hansen (17th season)
- Assistant coaches: Pat Eberhart; Tyler Erwin; Jake Koch
- Home arena: Baxter Arena

2021–22 Summit League men's basketball standings
	Conf.				Overall
Team	W		L	PCT	W		L	PCT
South Dakota State †	18	–	0	1.000	30	–	5	.857
North Dakota State	13	–	5	.722	23	–	10	.697
Kansas City	12	–	6	.667	19	–	12	.613
Oral Roberts	12	–	6	.667	19	–	12	.613
South Dakota	11	–	7	.611	19	–	12	.613
Western Illinois	7	–	11	.389	16	–	16	.500
Denver	7	–	11	.389	11	–	21	.344
St. Thomas *	4	–	14	.222	10	–	20	.333
Omaha	4	–	14	.222	5	–	25	.167
North Dakota	2	–	16	.111	6	–	25	.194
† 2022 Summit League tournament winner * Ineligible for the 2022 NCAA tournament due to transition from Division III

The 2021–22 Omaha Mavericks men's basketball team represented the University of Nebraska Omaha in the 2021–22 NCAA Division I men's basketball season. The Mavericks, led by 17th-year head coach Derrin Hansen, played their home games at Baxter Arena in Omaha, Nebraska, as members of the Summit League.

== Previous season ==
The Mavericks finished the 2020–21 season 5–20, 3–11 in Summit League play to finish in eighth place. They lost to South Dakota State in the quarterfinals of the Summit League tournament.

== Roster ==
2021–22 Omaha Mavericks men's basketball team
Players
Coaches

Pos.	#	Name	Height	Weight	Year	Hometown
G	0	Sam'i Roe	6 ft 1 in (1.85 m)	180 lb (82 kg)	Sr	Atlantic City, NJ
G	1	Nick Ferrarini	6 ft 5 in (1.96 m)	190 lb (86 kg)	Sr	Omaha, NE
G/F	2	Darrius Hughes	6 ft 7 in (2.01 m)	230 lb (104 kg)	Jr	Kansas City, MO
G	3	Kyle Luedtke	6 ft 5 in (1.96 m)	190 lb (86 kg)	Jr	Omaha, NE
G	11	La'Mel Robinson	6 ft 0 in (1.83 m)	160 lb (73 kg)	So	Riverside, MO
F	13	Wanjang Tut	6 ft 8 in (2.03 m)	205 lb (93 kg)	Sr	Omaha, NE
C	14	Dylan Brougham	6 ft 9 in (2.06 m)	195 lb (88 kg)	So	Riverside, MO
G	15	Grant Frickenstein	6 ft 3 in (1.91 m)	170 lb (77 kg)	So	Fremont, NE
F	21	Devin Evans	6 ft 9 in (2.06 m)	200 lb (91 kg)	Jr	Conyers, GA
G	22	Marco Smith	6 ft 2 in (1.88 m)	175 lb (79 kg)	Sr	Kansas City, KS
F	23	Frankie Fidler	6 ft 7 in (2.01 m)	200 lb (91 kg)	Fr	Bellevue, NE
G	25	Felix Lemetti	6 ft 1 in (1.85 m)	190 lb (86 kg)	Jr	Stockholm, Sweden
F	33	Akol Arop	6 ft 5 in (1.96 m)	203 lb (92 kg)	So	Omaha, NE
F	44	Isaiah Poor Bear-Chandler	6 ft 7 in (2.01 m)	250 lb (113 kg)	Sr	Omaha, NE

Head coach

- Derrin Hansen (Nebraska Wesleyan)

Assistant coach(es)

- Pat Eberhart (Adams State)
- Tyler Erwin (Midland)
- Jake Koch (Northern Iowa)

Legend

- (C) Team captain
- (S) Suspended
- (I) Ineligible
- (W) Walk-on
- Injured
- Current redshirt

Roster
Last update: November 16, 2021

== Schedule and results ==
Date time, TV	Rank^{#}	Opponent^{#}	Result	Record	Site (attendance) city, state
Non-conference regular season
November 9, 2021*; 7:00 pm		Hastings	W 67–57	1–0	Ralston Arena; Ralston, NE
November 13, 2021*; 11:00 am, ESPN+		at Ball State	L 69–73	1–1	Worthen Arena (2,752); Muncie, IN
November 17, 2021*; 7:00 pm, Big 12 Now		at Kansas State	L 64–79	1–2	Bramlage Coliseum (5,259); Manhattan, KS
November 20, 2021*; 8:00 pm, ESPN+		at Montana; Big Sky/Summit League Challenge	L 47–68	1–3	Dahlberg Arena (2,967); Missoula, MT
November 23, 2021*; 7:00 pm, Big 12 Now		at Texas Tech	L 40–96	1–4	United Supermarkets Arena (12,670); Lubbock, TX
November 26, 2021*; 1:00 pm, BTN+		at No. 3 Purdue	L 40–97	1–5	Mackey Arena (14,804); West Lafayette, IN
November 30, 2021*; 7:00 pm		SIU Edwardsville	L 65–75	1–6	Baxter Arena; Omaha, NE
December 4, 2021*; 12:00 pm		Eastern Washington; Big Sky/Summit League Challenge	L 81–92	1–7	Baxter Arena (1,111); Omaha, NE
December 8, 2021*; 8:00 pm		Drake	L 70–78	1–8	Baxter Arena; Omaha, NE
December 11, 2021*; 7:00 pm		Texas A&M–Corpus Christi	L 73–87	1–9	Baxter Arena (1,058); Omaha, NE
December 15, 2021*; 9:00 pm		at UNLV	L 71–84	1–10	Thomas & Mack Center (4,345); Paradise, NV
Summit League regular season
December 20, 2021; 7:00 pm		St. Thomas	L 73–80	1–11 (0–1)	Baxter Arena (1,483); Omaha, NE
December 22, 2021; 7:00 pm		Western Illinois	W 84–78	2–11 (1–1)	Baxter Arena (1,430); Omaha, NE
January 1, 2022; 7:00 pm		at Oral Roberts	L 62–107	2–12 (1–2)	Mabee Center (2,136); Tulsa, OK
January 6, 2022; 7:00 pm		North Dakota	W 98–82	3–12 (2–2)	Baxter Arena (1,003); Omaha, NE
January 8, 2022; 12:00 pm		North Dakota State	L 67–71	3–13 (2–3)	Baxter Arena (1,185); Omaha, NE
January 10, 2022; 7:00 pm		at Kansas City; Rescheduled from December 30	L 61–64	3–14 (2–4)	Swinney Recreation Center (495); Kansas City, MO
January 13, 2022; 7:30 pm		South Dakota State	L 86–95	3–15 (2–5)	Baxter Arena; Omaha, NE
January 15, 2022; 4:00 pm, ESPN+		at South Dakota	L 70–105	3–16 (2–6)	Sanford Coyote Sports Center (1,669); Vermillion, SD
January 22, 2022; 3:00 pm		at Denver	L 63–94	3–17 (2–7)	Hamilton Gymnasium (695); Denver, CO
January 27, 2022; 7:00 pm		Oral Roberts	L 88–100	3–18 (2–8)	Baxter Arena (1,688); Omaha, NE
January 29, 2022; 7:00 pm		Kansas City	W 69–68	4–18 (3–8)	Baxter Arena (1,957); Omaha, NE
February 3, 2022; 7:00 pm, ESPN+		at North Dakota State	L 64–71	4–19 (3–9)	Scheels Center (1,356); Fargo, ND
February 5, 2022; 1:00 pm, ESPN+		at North Dakota	L 85–92	4–20 (3–10)	Betty Engelstad Sioux Center (1,477); Grand Forks, ND
February 10, 2022; 7:00 pm		South Dakota	L 69–91	4–21 (3–11)	Baxter Arena (1,198); Omaha, NE
February 12, 2022; 4:15 pm		at South Dakota State	L 61–82	4–22 (3–12)	Frost Arena (3,380); Brookings, SD
February 17, 2022; 7:00 pm		Denver	W 72–69	5–22 (4–12)	Baxter Arena (1,367); Omaha, NE
February 24, 2022; 6:00 pm, ESPN+		at Western Illinois	L 76–88	5–23 (4–13)	Western Hall (621); Macomb, IL
February 26, 2022; 7:00 pm		at St. Thomas	L 74–95	5–24 (4–14)	Schoenecker Arena (1,150); St. Paul, MN
Summit League tournament
March 5, 2022; 6:00 pm, ESPN+	(8)	vs. (1) South Dakota State; Quarterfinals	L 79–87	5–25	Denny Sanford Premier Center (9,336); Sioux Falls, SD
*Non-conference game. ^{#}Rankings from AP Poll. (#) Tournament seedings in parentheses. All times are in Central.
