= 2021–22 North Dakota Fighting Hawks men's basketball team =

American college basketball season

2021–22 North Dakota Fighting Hawks men's basketball
- Conference: Summit League
- Record: 6–25 (2–16 The Summit)
- Head coach: Paul Sather (3rd season)
- Assistant coaches: Jamie Stevens; Zach Horstman; Steven Aldridge
- Home arena: Betty Engelstad Sioux Center

2021–22 Summit League men's basketball standings
	Conf.				Overall
Team	W		L	PCT	W		L	PCT
South Dakota State †	18	–	0	1.000	30	–	5	.857
North Dakota State	13	–	5	.722	23	–	10	.697
Kansas City	12	–	6	.667	19	–	12	.613
Oral Roberts	12	–	6	.667	19	–	12	.613
South Dakota	11	–	7	.611	19	–	12	.613
Western Illinois	7	–	11	.389	16	–	16	.500
Denver	7	–	11	.389	11	–	21	.344
St. Thomas *	4	–	14	.222	10	–	20	.333
Omaha	4	–	14	.222	5	–	25	.167
North Dakota	2	–	16	.111	6	–	25	.194
† 2022 Summit League tournament winner * Ineligible for the 2022 NCAA tournament due to transition from Division III

The 2021–22 North Dakota Fighting Hawks basketball team represented the University of North Dakota in the 2021–22 NCAA Division I men's basketball season. The Fighting Hawks were led by third-year head coach Paul Sather and played their home games at the Betty Engelstad Sioux Center in Grand Forks, North Dakota, as members of the Summit League.

== Previous season ==
Under second-year head coach Paul Sather, the Fighting Hawks accumulated a record of 9–17 (8–8 Summit) and placed 5th overall in the conference, which was their highest finish in the conference since joining. The Fighting Hawks lost in the first round of the 2021 Summit League tournament to Oral Roberts who eventually made it to the Sweet Sixteen of the 2021 NCAA Division I men's basketball tournament.

== Roster ==
2021–22 North Dakota Fighting Hawks men's basketball team
Players
Coaches

Pos.	#	Name	Height	Weight	Year	Hometown
G	0	Caleb Nero	6 ft 2 in (1.88 m)	180 lb (82 kg)	Jr	Tulsa, Oklahoma
G	2	Matt Norman	6 ft 4 in (1.93 m)	195 lb (88 kg)	So	Orem, Utah
G	3	Reid Grant	6 ft 3 in (1.91 m)	185 lb (84 kg)	Fr	Johnston, Iowa
F	4	A'Jahni Levias	6 ft 6 in (1.98 m)	215 lb (98 kg)	Fr	Vallejo, California
G	5	Jackson Anderson	6 ft 2 in (1.88 m)	170 lb (77 kg)	Fr	Hillsboro, North Dakota
F	10	Tsotne Tsartsidze	6 ft 9 in (2.06 m)	235 lb (107 kg)	So	Tbilisi, Georgia
G	11	Bentiu Panoam	6 ft 2 in (1.88 m)	168 lb (76 kg)	Sr	Anchorage, Alaska
F	12	Gavin McGrath	6 ft 10 in (2.08 m)	205 lb (93 kg)	Fr	Onalaska, Wisconsin
G	15	Brady Danielson	6 ft 4 in (1.93 m)	200 lb (91 kg)	Jr	York, Nebraska
G	21	Ethan Igbanugo	6 ft 3 in (1.91 m)	191 lb (87 kg)	Sr	Lakeville, Minnesota
G	23	Paul Bruns	6 ft 4 in (1.93 m)	190 lb (86 kg)	Fr	Jefferson, South Dakota
F	32	Brendan Howard	6 ft 5 in (1.96 m)	230 lb (104 kg)	Jr	Great Falls, Montana
F	34	Brian Matthews	6 ft 9 in (2.06 m)	230 lb (104 kg)	Fr	Chicago, Illinois
F	35	Mitchell Sueker	6 ft 9 in (2.06 m)	220 lb (100 kg)	Sr	Marshall, Minnesota

Head coach

- Paul Sather

Assistant coach(es)

- Jamie Stevens
- Zach Horstman
- Steven Aldridge

Legend

- (C) Team captain
- (S) Suspended
- (I) Ineligible
- (W) Walk-on
- Injured
- Current redshirt

Roster
Last update: November 15, 2021

== Schedule and results ==
Date time, TV	Rank^{#}	Opponent^{#}	Result	Record	Site (attendance) city, state
Exhibition
November 1, 2021*; 7:00 pm		Mayville State	W 68–64	–	Betty Engelstad Sioux Center (1,234); Grand Forks, ND
Non-conference regular season
November 9, 2021*; 7:00 pm, BSN		Milwaukee	L 60–75	0–1	Betty Engelstad Sioux Center (1,628); Grand Forks, ND
November 15, 2021*; 7:00 pm, MidcoSN/ESPN+		Montana	W 79–77	1–1	Betty Engelstad Sioux Center (1,263); Grand Forks, ND
November 19, 2021*; 2:00 pm, CUSA.tv		vs. Troy; Paradise Classic	W 74–72	2–1	FAU Arena (122); Boca Raton, FL
November 20, 2021*; 5:00 pm, CUSA.tv		at Florida Atlantic; Paradise Classic	L 79–98	2–2	FAU Arena (926); Boca Raton, FL
November 21, 2021*; 1:00 pm, CUSA.tv		vs. UT Martin; Paradise Classic	L 72–77	2–3	FAU Arena (292); Boca Raton, FL
November 24, 2021*; 10:00 am		at FIU	L 56–65	2–4	Ocean Bank Convocation Center; Miami, FL
November 28, 2021*; 4:00 pm, Big 12 Now		at Kansas State	L 42–84	2–5	Bramlage Coliseum (4,998); Manhattan, KS
November 30, 2021*; 7:00 pm		Presentation College	W 72–55	3–5	Betty Engelstad Sioux Center (1,250); Grand Forks, ND
December 3, 2021*; 9:00 pm		at San Jose State	L 51–76	3–6	Provident Credit Union Event Center (1,407); San Jose, CA
December 7, 2021*; 9:00 pm, ESPN+		at California Baptist	L 71–89	3–7	CBU Events Center (2,606); Riverside, CA
December 11, 2021*; 1:00 pm, MidcoSN2/ESPN+		Eastern Washington	L 60–76	3–8	Betty Engelstad Sioux Center (1,280); Grand Forks, ND
December 14, 2021*; 7:00 pm		North Central	W 110–65	4–8	Betty Engelstad Sioux Center (1,137); Grand Forks, ND
December 18, 2021*; 1:00 pm		Dixie State	L 69–78	4–9	Betty Engelstad Sioux Center (1,187); Grand Forks, ND
Summit League regular season
December 22, 2021; 7:00 pm, WDAY Xtra/ESPN+		at North Dakota State	L 76–86	4–10 (0–1)	Scheels Center (3510); Fargo, ND
January 1, 2022; 7:00 pm		South Dakota State	Postponed due to COVID-19 issues		Betty Engelstead Sioux Center; Grand Forks, ND
January 6, 2022; 7:00 pm		at Omaha	L 82–98	4–11 (0–2)	Baxter Arena (1,003); Omaha, NE
January 8, 2022; 3:00 pm		at Denver	L 74–93	4–12 (0–3)	Hamilton Gymnasium (727); Denver, CO
January 10, 2022; 7:00 pm, MidcoSN/ESPN+		South Dakota; Rescheduled from December 30	L 68–75	4–13 (0–4)	Betty Engelstad Sioux Center (1,207); Grand Forks, ND
January 13, 2022; 7:00 pm, ESPN+		Western Illinois	L 68–73	4–14 (0–5)	Betty Engelstead Sioux Center (1,258); Grand Forks, ND
January 15, 2022; 1:00 pm		St. Thomas	Postponed due to COVID-19 issues		Betty Engelstead Sioux Center; Grand Forks, ND
January 20, 2022; 7:00 pm		at Oral Roberts	L 76–80	4–15 (0–6)	Mabee Center (3,819); Tulsa, OK
January 22, 2022; 7:00 pm		at Kansas City	L 74–79	4–16 (0–7)	Swinney Recreation Center (572); Kansas City, MO
January 27, 2022; 7:00 pm, MidcoSN/ESPN+		at South Dakota State	L 61–96	4–17 (0–8)	Frost Arena (1,856); Brookings, SD
January 29, 2022; 4:00 pm, GoYotes.com		at South Dakota	L 58–71	4–18 (0–9)	Sanford Coyote Sports Center (2,112); Vermillion, SD
January 31, 2022; 7:00 pm, MidcoSN/ESPN+		South Dakota State; Rescheduled from January 1	L 64–70	4–19 (0–10)	Betty Engelstead Sioux Center (1,254); Grand Forks, ND
February 3, 2022; 7:00 pm, MidcoSN/ESPN+		Denver	L 79–81 ^{OT}	4–20 (0–11)	Betty Engelstead Sioux Center (1,296); Grand Forks, ND
February 5, 2022; 1:00 pm, MidcoSN2/ESPN+		Omaha	W 92–85	5–20 (1–11)	Betty Engelstead Sioux Center (1,477); Grand Forks, ND
February 10, 2022; 7:00 pm		at St. Thomas	W 92–85	6–20 (2–11)	Schoenecker Arena (1,477); St. Paul, MN
February 12, 2022; 2:00 pm, ESPN3		at Western Illinois	L 68–70	6–21 (2–12)	Western Hall (827); Macomb, IL
February 17, 2022; 7:00 pm, BSN		Kansas City	L 65–80	6–22 (2–13)	Betty Engelstead Sioux Center (1,361); Grand Forks, ND
February 19, 2022; 1:00 pm, BSN		Oral Roberts	L 73–87	6–23 (2–14)	Betty Engelstead Sioux Center (1,400); Grand Forks, ND
February 22, 2022; 12:00 pm		St. Thomas; Rescheduled from January 15	L 74–84	6–24 (2–15)	Betty Engelstead Sioux Center (1,173); Grand Forks, ND
February 26, 2022; 1:00 pm, MidcoSN2/ESPN3		North Dakota State	L 53–79	6–25 (2–16)	Betty Engelstead Sioux Center (2,541); Grand Forks, ND
*Non-conference game. ^{#}Rankings from AP Poll. (#) Tournament seedings in parentheses. All times are in Central.
