= 2021–22 Kansas City Roos men's basketball team =

American college basketball season

2021–22 Kansas City Roos men's basketball
- Conference: Summit League
- Record: 19–12 (12–6 The Summit)
- Head coach: Billy Donlon (3rd season)
- Assistant coaches: Steve Payne (3rd season); Vince Fritz (1st season); Matt Vest (1st season)
- Home arena: Swinney Recreation Center

2021–22 Summit League men's basketball standings
	Conf.				Overall
Team	W		L	PCT	W		L	PCT
South Dakota State †	18	–	0	1.000	30	–	5	.857
North Dakota State	13	–	5	.722	23	–	10	.697
Kansas City	12	–	6	.667	19	–	12	.613
Oral Roberts	12	–	6	.667	19	–	12	.613
South Dakota	11	–	7	.611	19	–	12	.613
Western Illinois	7	–	11	.389	16	–	16	.500
Denver	7	–	11	.389	11	–	21	.344
St. Thomas *	4	–	14	.222	10	–	20	.333
Omaha	4	–	14	.222	5	–	25	.167
North Dakota	2	–	16	.111	6	–	25	.194
† 2022 Summit League tournament winner * Ineligible for the 2022 NCAA tournament due to transition from Division III

The 2021–22 Kansas City Roos men's basketball team represented the University of Missouri–Kansas City during the 2021–22 NCAA Division I men's basketball season. The Roos, led by third-year head coach Billy Donlon, played their home games on-campus at Swinney Recreation Center in Kansas City, Missouri as a returning member of the Summit League.

The Roos finished the season 19–12 overall, 12–6 in Summit League play, to finish in a tie for third place. They were defeated by South Dakota in the Summit League tournament quarterfinal round.

Approximately six weeks following the end of the season, Coach Donlon announced his resignation as head coach in order to "pursue other opportunities". Within four days, Donlon was announced as the associate head coach at Clemson University, reuniting with head coach Brad Brownell. Brownell and Donlon were both assistant coaches at the University of North Carolina Wilmington (UNCW) in 2001–02. Donlon continued on at UNCW as an assistant coach when Brownell was named the program's head coach (2002–06). Donlon followed Brownell to his next stop at Wright State University (WSU), becoming his associate head coach (2006–10). Donlon ultimately was named the head coach at WSU when Brownell went to Clemson.

== Previous season ==
The Roos finished the 2020–21 season with a record of 11–13 overall, 7–7 in Summit League play to finish in a tie for fifth place.

== Roster ==
2021–22 Kansas City Roos men's basketball team
Players
Coaches

Pos.	#	Name	Height	Weight	Year	Previous school	Hometown
G	1	Evan II Gilyard	5 ft 10 in (1.78 m)	—	GS	New Mexico State/ UTEP Simeon Career	Chicago, IL
F	3	Arkel Lamar	6 ft 5 in (1.96 m)	235 lb (107 kg)	GS	UMBC St. Thomas More School/ St. Thomas Aquinas HS	Bridgeport, CT
G	33	Marvin Jr. Nesbitt	6 ft 4 in (1.93 m)	180 lb (82 kg)	GS	Butler College Preparatory HS	Chicago, IL
G	5	Shemarri Allen	6 ft 4 in (1.93 m)	—	Jr	Cowley Believe Sports Academy/ T. C. Roberson HS/ Victory Christian Center	Arden, NC
F	20	Josiah Allick	6 ft 8 in (2.03 m)	240 lb (109 kg)	Jr	Lincoln North Star HS	Lincoln, NE
G	11	Anderson Kopp	6 ft 5 in (1.96 m)	190 lb (86 kg)	Jr	Lamar St. Thomas HS	Houston, TX
F	10	Hidde Roessink	6 ft 10 in (2.08 m)	220 lb (100 kg)	Jr	Oklahoma State Rodenborch-College HS	Arnhem, Netherlands
G	4	Jacob Johnson	6 ft 5 in (1.96 m)	200 lb (91 kg)	RS So	Champlin Park HS	Brooklyn Park, MN
G	21	Sam Martin	6 ft 0 in (1.83 m)	185 lb (84 kg)	RS So	Burleson HS	Houston, TX
F	35	Caden Boser	6 ft 8 in (2.03 m)	200 lb (91 kg)	So	Memorial HS	Eau Claire, WI
F	44	Trace Evans	6 ft 9 in (2.06 m)	—	So	Lake Region State Lambton HS	Newcastle, Australia
G	15	Paxton Payne	6 ft 2 in (1.88 m)	185 lb (84 kg)	So	Smithville HS	Kansas City, MO
G	0	Timothy Barnes	6 ft 3 in (1.91 m)	185 lb (84 kg)	Fr	Gray Collegiate Academy	West Columbia, SC
F	12	Blake Bowman	6 ft 5 in (1.96 m)	—	Fr	Derby College	Derby, United Kingdom
F	34	Jack Chapman	6 ft 7 in (2.01 m)	—	Fr	Blue Valley Northwest HS	Overland Park, KS
G	2	Justus Peuser	6 ft 1 in (1.85 m)	—	Fr	Rheingauschule Geisenheim	Rüdesheim, Germany

Head coach

- Billy Donlon (UNC Wilmington)

Assistant coach(es)

- Steve Payne (Union Commonwealth)
- Vince Fritz (Sacred Heart)
- Matt Vest (Wright State)

Legend

- (C) Team captain
- (S) Suspended
- (I) Ineligible
- (W) Walk-on
- (5Y) Fifth-year senior
- Injured
- Current redshirt

Roster
Last update: November 3, 2024

== Schedule & results ==
Date time, TV	Rank^{#}	Opponent^{#}	Result	Record	High points	High rebounds	High assists	Site (attendance) city, state
Regular Season
November 9, 2021*; 7:00 p.m., B1G+		at Minnesota	L 56–71	0–1	21 – Allick	7 – Nesbitt Jr.	5 – Johnson	Williams Arena (8,975); Minneapolis, MN
November 12, 2021*; 7:00 p.m., B1G+		at Iowa	L 57–89	0–2	11 – Kopp	8 – Nesbitt Jr.	3 – Gilyard II	Carver–Hawkeye Arena (11,133); Iowa City, IA
November 15, 2021*; 7:00 p.m., SECN+		at Missouri	W 80–66	1–2	28 – Gilyard II	7 – Kopp	4 – Nesbitt Jr.	Mizzou Arena (6,887); Columbia, MO
November 17, 2021*; 7:00 p.m.		Kansas Christian	W 99–36	2–2	17 – Allick, Kopp	8 – Nesbitt Jr., Allick	6 – Peuser	Swinney Recreation Center (605); Kansas City, MO
November 22, 2021*; 8:00 p.m., ESPN+		at Idaho State	W 74–58	3–2	30 – Gilyard II	5 – Nesbitt Jr., Boser	2 – Gilyard II	Reed Gym (1,176); Pocatello, ID
November 27, 2021*; 6:00 p.m.		vs. Morehead State; CollegeInsider.com Eracism Invitational round-robin	L 62–70	3–3	17 – Allick, Kopp	11 – Nesbitt Jr.	5 – Allick	First National Bank Arena (181); Jonesboro, AR
November 28, 2021*; 3:00 p.m., ESPN+		at Arkansas State; CollegeInsider.com Eracism Invitational round-robin	L 55–66	3–4	12 – Allick	9 – Allick	3 – Nesbitt Jr., Martin	First National Bank Arena (801); Jonesboro, AR
December 4, 2021*; 7:00 p.m.		Calvary	W 94–32	4–4	22 – Martin	12 – Johnson	9 – Allen	Swinney Recreation Center (612); Kansas City, MO
December 10, 2021*; 7:00 p.m.		Green Bay	W 64–55	5–4	18 – Allick	7 – Allick	5 – Gilyard II	Swinney Recreation Center (1,052); Kansas City, MO
December 12, 2021*; 2:00 p.m., ESPN+		at SIUE	L 56–60	5–5	19 – Gilyard II	8 – Nesbitt Jr.	4 – Gilyard II, Kopp	First Community Arena (687); Edwardsville, IL
December 20, 2021; 7:00 p.m., ESPN+		at South Dakota State	L 57–89	5–6 (0–1)	11 – Barnes	5 – Evans	2 – Johnson, Martin	Frost Arena (1,438); Brookings, SD
December 22, 2021; 7:00 p.m.		at South Dakota	W 68–57	6–6 (1–1)	31 – Gilyard II	7 – Nesbitt Jr.	2 – Gilyard II, Allen	Sanford Coyote Sports Center (1,635); Vermillion, SD
December 30, 2021; 7:00 p.m.		Omaha; Rescheduled to January 10, 2022	Postponed (COVID–19 pandemic)					Swinney Recreation Center; Kansas City, MO
January 1, 2022; 7:00 p.m.		Denver; Rescheduled to January 17, 2022	Postponed (COVID–19 pandemic)					Swinney Recreation Center; Kansas City, MO
January 6, 2022; 6:00 p.m.		at Western Illinois; Rescheduled to January 31, 2022	Postponed (COVID–19 pandemic)					Western Hall; Macomb, IL
January 8, 2022; 7:00 p.m.		at St. Thomas; Rescheduled to February 8, 2022	Postponed (COVID–19 pandemic)					Schoenecker Arena; St. Paul, MN
January 10, 2022; 7:00 p.m.		Omaha; Rescheduled from December 30, 2021	W 64–61	7–6 (2–1)	20 – Lamar	8 – Nesbitt Jr.	7 – Gilyard II	Swinney Recreation Center (495); Kansas City, MO
January 11, 2022*; 7:00 p.m.		Baptist Bible	W 98–57	8–6	19 – Kopp	7 – Lamar, Nesbitt Jr.	5 – Gilyard II, Allen	Swinney Recreation Center (446); Kansas City, MO
January 15, 2022; 7:00 p.m.		Oral Roberts	L 72–84	8–7 (2–2)	19 – Nesbitt Jr.	9 – Lamar, Nesbitt Jr.	5 – Gilyard II	Swinney Recreation Center (766); Kansas City, MO
January 17, 2022; 7:00 p.m.		Denver; Rescheduled from January 1, 2022	L 55–63	8–8 (2–3)	16 – Gilyard II	7 – Kopp	3 – Lamar	Swinney Recreation Center (495); Kansas City, MO
January 20, 2022; 7:00 p.m.		North Dakota State	W 80–77	9–8 (3–3)	24 – Lamar	6 – Lamar, Nesbitt Jr.	6 – Nesbitt Jr.	Swinney Recreation Center (631); Kansas City, MO
January 22, 2022; 7:00 p.m.		North Dakota	W 79–74	10–8 (4–3)	30 – Gilyard II	9 – Lamar	4 – Lamar, Nesbitt Jr.	Swinney Recreation Center (572); Kansas City, MO
January 24, 2022*; 6:00 p.m.		Spurgeon	W 111–44	11–8	27 – Chapman	14 – Chapman	7 – Kopp	Swinney Recreation Center; Kansas City, MO
January 27, 2022; 8:00 p.m.		at Denver	W 72–61	12–8 (5–3)	23 – Gilyard II	8 – Nesbitt Jr.	3 – Boser	Hamilton Gymnasium (474); Denver, CO
January 29, 2022; 7:00 p.m.		at Omaha	L 68–69	12–9 (5–4)	17 – Gilyard II	10 – Lamar	2 – Gilyard II, Lamar	Baxter Arena (1,957); Omaha, NE
January 31, 2022; 6:00 p.m.		at Western Illinois; Rescheduled from January 6, 2022	W 83–75	13–9 (6–4)	33 – Gilyard II	12 – Nesbitt Jr.	8 – Gilyard II	Western Hall (633); Macomb, IL
February 3, 2022; 7:00 p.m.		St. Thomas	W 81–72	14–9 (7–4)	23 – Gilyard II	10 – Nesbitt Jr.	6 – Gilyard II	Swinney Recreation Center (584); Kansas City, MO
February 5, 2022; 7:00 p.m.		Western Illinois	W 91–82	15–9 (8–4)	26 – Nesbitt Jr.	8 – Lamar	4 – Lamar, Allen	Swinney Recreation Center (876); Kansas City, MO
February 8, 2022; 7:00 p.m.		at St. Thomas; Rescheduled from January 8, 2022	W 76–67	16–9 (9–4)	22 – Nesbitt Jr.	7 – Lamar, Allick	2 – Gilyard II, Nesbitt Jr.	Schoenecker Arena (710); St. Paul, MN
February 12, 2022; 7:00 p.m.		at Oral Roberts	L 86–91	16–10 (9–5)	29 – Gilyard II	13 – Nesbitt Jr.	6 – Gilyard II	Mabee Center (4,453); Tulsa, OK
February 17, 2022; 7:00 p.m.		at North Dakota	W 80–65	17–10 (10–5)	19 – Gilyard II	11 – Allick	6 – Gilyard II	Betty Engelstad Sioux Center (1,361); Grand Forks, ND
February 19, 2022; 1:00 p.m., ESPN3		at North Dakota State	W 75–61	18–10 (11–5)	33 – Gilyard II	7 – Lamar	7 – Gilyard II	Scheels Center (2,683); Fargo, ND
February 24, 2022; 7:00 p.m.		South Dakota	W 72–63	19–10 (12–5)	20 – Gilyard II	12 – Allick	4 – Allick	Swinney Recreation Center (1,046); Kansas City, MO
February 26, 2022; 7:00 p.m., ESPN+		South Dakota State	L 75–86	19–11 (12–6)	21 – Allick	7 – Nesbitt Jr., Allick	5 – Nesbitt Jr.	Swinney Recreation Center (1,558); Kansas City, MO
Summit League tournament
March 6, 2022*; 6:00 p.m., ESPN+	(4)	vs. (5) South Dakota; Quarterfinals	L 61–74	19–12	19 – Nesbitt Jr.	9 – Lamar	4 – Nesbitt Jr.	Denny Sanford Premier Center (7,364); Sioux Falls, SD
*Non-conference game. ^{#}Rankings from AP poll. (#) Tournament seedings in parentheses. All times are in Central.
