= Douglas Wilson (basketball) =

American basketball player

Personal information
- Born: January 7, 1999 (age 27) Evanston, Illinois, U.S.
- Listed height: 6 ft 7 in (2.01 m)
- Listed weight: 220 lb (100 kg)

Career information
- High school: Herbert Hoover (Des Moines, Iowa)
- College: Kirkwood CC (2017–2019); South Dakota State (2019–2022)
- NBA draft: 2022: undrafted
- Position: Power forward

Career history
- 2023–2024: Álftanes

Career highlights
- Summit League Player of the Year (2020); 2× First-team All-Summit League (2020, 2022); Second-team All-Summit League (2021); Summit League tournament MVP (2022); Summit League Newcomer of the Year (2020); NJCAA Division II Player of the Year (2019); First-team NJCAA DII All-American (2019); Second-team NJCAA DII All-American (2018)

Douglas Wilson (born January 7, 1999) is an American professional basketball player. He played college basketball for the Kirkwood CC Eagles and the South Dakota State Jackrabbits.

== Early life ==
Wilson was born in Evanston, Illinois and grew up in Des Moines, Iowa and attended Herbert Hoover High School. Wilson averaged 17.9 points per game on 58.2 percent shooting and grabbed 309 rebounds as a senior. He was named All-Central Iowa Metro League.

== College career ==
Wilson began his college career at Kirkwood Community College. As a freshman, he averaged 14.1 points, 6.6 rebounds and 1.9 blocks per game and was named a NJCAA Division II Second Team All-American. Following the end of the season, he committed to transfer to South Dakota State after his sophomore season. He averaged 21 points and 8.7 rebounds per game as a sophomore and was named a first team NJCAA All-American, the Iowa Community College Athletic Conference Player of the Year and the DII Player of the Year as he led the Eagles to the NJCAA Division II national championship.

Wilson became an immediate starter at power forward for the Jackrabbits. He was named the Summit League Men's Basketball Player of the Year and Newcomer of the Year as well as First Team All-Summit League recognition in his first season with the team. Wilson missed the Summit League quarterfinal loss to Purdue Fort Wayne with an injury. He averaged 18.7 points and 6.4 rebounds per game on a team that finished 22–10. As a senior, Wilson averaged 16.7 points, 5.4 rebounds and 2.3 assists per game, earning Second Team All-Summit League honors. He opted to return for an additional season of eligibility, granted by the NCAA due to the COVID-19 pandemic.

In 2022, Wilson was named to the First Team All-Summit League, while teammate Baylor Scheierman was named Player of the Year.

== Professional career ==
In October 2022, Wilson signed with ALM Evreux Basket in France but never played for the team after failing a physical due to a possible enlarged heart. After getting a green light from doctors, Wilson signed with Álftanes of the Icelandic Úrvalsdeild karla in June 2023. In 20 games for Álftanes, he averaged 18.9 points and 8.6 rebounds per game.

== Career statistics ==
Legend
GP	Games played	GS	Games started	MPG	Minutes per game
FG%	Field goal percentage	3P%	3-point field goal percentage	FT%	Free throw percentage
RPG	Rebounds per game	APG	Assists per game	SPG	Steals per game
BPG	Blocks per game	PPG	Points per game	**Bold**	Career high

=== College ===
==== NCAA Division I ====
Year	Team	GP	GS	MPG	FG%	3P%	FT%	RPG	APG	SPG	BPG	PPG
2019–20	South Dakota State	29	29	**29.7**	**.629**	.167	.667	**6.4**	1.8	.8	**.8**	**18.7**
2020–21	South Dakota State	19	18	28.6	.506	–	.611	5.4	**2.3**	**1.2**	.6	16.7
2021–22	South Dakota State	**34**	**34**	25.0	.569	**.333**	**.684**	5.5	1.6	.9	.6	16.4
Career		82	81	27.5	.576	.250	.659	5.8	1.8	.9	.7	17.3

==== JUCO ====
Year	Team	GP	GS	MPG	FG%	3P%	FT%	RPG	APG	SPG	BPG	PPG
2017–18	Kirkwood CC	30	30	23.0	**.692**	–	.462	6.6	.6	.5	**1.9**	14.1
2018–19	Kirkwood CC	**34**	**33**	**25.2**	.670	**1.000**	**.700**	**8.7**	**2.4**	**.9**	1.8	**21.0**
Career		64	63	24.2	.679	1.000	.621	7.7	1.6	.7	1.8	17.8
