= 2022 Summit League men's basketball tournament =

- Classification: Division I
- Season: 2021–22
- Teams: 8
- Site: Denny Sanford Premier Center; Sioux Falls, South Dakota
- Champions: South Dakota State (6th title)
- Winning coach: Eric Henderson (1st title)
- MVP: Douglas Wilson
- Television: ESPN+, ESPN2

2021–22 Summit League men's basketball standings
| | Conf. | | | | Overall |
| Team | W | | L | PCT | W | | L | PCT |
|---|---|---|---|---|---|---|---|---|
| South Dakota State † | 18 | – | 0 | 1.000 | 30 | – | 5 | .857 |
| North Dakota State | 13 | – | 5 | .722 | 23 | – | 10 | .697 |
| Kansas City | 12 | – | 6 | .667 | 19 | – | 12 | .613 |
| Oral Roberts | 12 | – | 6 | .667 | 19 | – | 12 | .613 |
| South Dakota | 11 | – | 7 | .611 | 19 | – | 12 | .613 |
| Western Illinois | 7 | – | 11 | .389 | 16 | – | 16 | .500 |
| Denver | 7 | – | 11 | .389 | 11 | – | 21 | .344 |
| St. Thomas * | 4 | – | 14 | .222 | 10 | – | 20 | .333 |
| Omaha | 4 | – | 14 | .222 | 5 | – | 25 | .167 |
| North Dakota | 2 | – | 16 | .111 | 6 | – | 25 | .194 |
* Ineligible for the 2022 NCAA tournament due to transition from Division III
† 2022 Summit League tournament winner

The 2022 Summit League men's basketball tournament was the postseason men's basketball tournament for the Summit League for the 2021–22 season. All tournament games were played at the Denny Sanford Premier Center in Sioux Falls, South Dakota, during March 5–8, 2022.

Top-seeded South Dakota State defeated second-seeded North Dakota State, 75–69, to claim their first title in four years as well as the conference's automatic bid to the NCAA tournament.

== Seeds ==
The top eight teams by conference record in the Summit League will compete in the conference tournament. St. Thomas was not eligible, due to its transition from Division III. Teams are seeded by record within the conference, with a tiebreaker system to seed teams with identical conference records. The tiebreakers operate in the following order:

1. Head-to-head record.
2. Record against the top-seeded team not involved in the tie, going down through the standings until the tie is broken.

| Seed | School | Conf. record | Tiebreaker(s) |
|---|---|---|---|
| 1 | South Dakota State | 18–0 | |
| 2 | North Dakota State | 13–5 | |
| 3 | Oral Roberts | 12–6 | 2–0 vs. Kansas City |
| 4 | Kansas City | 12–6 | 0–2 vs. Oral Roberts |
| 5 | South Dakota | 11–7 | |
| 6 | Western Illinois | 7–11 | 1–1 vs. North Dakota State |
| 7 | Denver | 7–11 | 0–2 vs. North Dakota State |
| 8 | Omaha | 4–14 | |

== Schedule and results ==
| Game | Time | Matchup | Score | Television |
Quarterfinals – Saturday, March 5
| 1 | 6:00 pm | No. 1 South Dakota State vs. No. 8 Omaha | 87–79 | MidcoSN/ESPN+ |
| 2 | 8:30 pm | No. 2 North Dakota State vs. No. 7 Denver | 82–62 | MidcoSN/ESPN+ |
Quarterfinals – Sunday, March 6
| 3 | 6:00 pm | No. 4 Kansas City vs. No. 5 South Dakota | 74–61 | MidcoSN/ESPN+ |
| 4 | 8:30 pm | No. 3 Oral Roberts vs. No. 6 Western Illinois | 80–68 | MidcoSN/ESPN+ |
Semifinals – Monday, March 7
| 5 | 6:00 pm | No. 1 South Dakota State vs. No. 5 South Dakota | 83–60 | MidcoSN/ESPN+ |
| 6 | 8:30 pm | No. 2 North Dakota State vs. No. 3 Oral Roberts | 92–72 | MidcoSN/ESPN+ |
Final – Tuesday, March 8
| 7 | 8:00 pm | No. 1 South Dakota State vs. No. 2 North Dakota State | 75-69 | ESPN2 |
*Game times in CST. Rankings denote tournament seed. Reference:

== Bracket ==
Quarterfinals; March 5 & 6 ESPN+
1 | South Dakota State | 87
8 | Omaha | 79
4 | Kansas City | 61
5 | South Dakota | 74
2 | North Dakota State | 82
7 | Denver | 62
3 | Oral Roberts | 80
6 | Western Illinois | 68

Semifinals; March 7 ESPN+
1 | South Dakota State | 83
5 | South Dakota | 60
2 | North Dakota State | 92
3 | Oral Roberts | 72

Final; March 8 ESPN2
1 | South Dakota State | 75
2 | North Dakota State | 69

== All-Tournament Team ==
The following players were named to the All-Tournament Team:

| Player | School |
|---|---|
| Douglas Wilson (MVP) | South Dakota State |
| Baylor Scheierman | South Dakota State |
| Sam Griesel | North Dakota State |
| Grant Nelson | North Dakota State |
| Max Abmas | Oral Roberts |
