= Eric Henderson (basketball) =

American basketball coach (born 1978)

Current position
- Title: Head coach
- Team: Drake
- Conference: MVC
- Record: 14–20 (.412)

Biographical details
- Born: May 30, 1978 (age 48)

Playing career
- 1996–2000: Wayne State (NE)

Coaching career (HC unless noted)
- 2001–2003: Wayne State (NE) (assistant)
- 2003–2005: Wayne HS (girls)
- 2009–2014: Burlington Catholic Central HS
- 2014–2016: North Dakota State (assistant)
- 2016–2019: South Dakota State (assistant)
- 2019–2025: South Dakota State
- 2025–present: Drake

Head coaching record
- Overall: 143–80 (.641)
- Tournaments: 0–2 (NCAA Division I)

Accomplishments and honors

Championships
- 4 Summit League regular season (2020, 2021, 2022, 2024); 2 Summit League tournament (2022, 2024)

Awards
- 2× Summit League Coach of the Year (2020, 2022)

Eric Nicholas Henderson (born May 30, 1978) is an American basketball coach. He currently coaches the Drake Bulldogs men's basketball team.

== Playing career ==
Henderson played college basketball at Wayne State College in Nebraska under Greg McDermott where he registered 876 rebounds and 160 career steals. He was inducted into the Wayne State College Athletic Hall of Fame in 2008.

== Coaching career ==
After graduation, Henderson joined the coaching staff of his alma mater from 2001 to 2003. He would then enter the high school ranks as the girls basketball coach at Wayne High School until 2005. He then joined the Iowa State men's basketball program as a graduate manager and learning specialist under McDermott. Henderson would return to coaching high school in 2009 and spent five seasons as the head boys basketball coach at Burlington Catholic Central High School, while also serving as the school's athletic director and principal. In 2014, Henderson joined the staff at North Dakota State, and was part of the Bison's 2015 NCAA tournament squad. Two years later, Henderson would join conference rival South Dakota State's coaching staff, rising to associate head coach.

On March 27, 2019, Henderson was named the 22nd head coach in Jackrabbits history, replacing T. J. Otzelberger who accepted the head coaching position at UNLV. After leading the Jackrabbits to a 13-3 conference record in his first season, Henderson was named Summit League coach of the year.

South Dakota State accumulated a 129-60 record with Henderson as head coach. His six-year tenure guiding the program saw the Jacks claim four Summit League regular season titles, along with two conference tournament championships which led to two NCAA Tournament appearances in 2022 and 2024.

On March 28, 2025, Henderson became the coach of the Drake Bulldogs. In the team's first season under Henderson, Drake finished 9th in the 11-team Missouri Valley Conference, despite featuring the conference's leading scorer Jalen Quinn. But with Quinn leading the way, Drake managed to upset the No. 8-ranked Southern Illinois and then the No. 1 Belmont Bruins in the 2026 Arch Madness conference tournament before falling to the University of Illinois Chicago in the semifinal game.

== Head coaching record ==
Record table
Season	Team	Overall	Conference	Standing	Postseason
South Dakota State Jackrabbits (Summit League) (2019–2025)
2019–20	South Dakota State	22–10	13–3	T–1st	No postseason held
2020–21	South Dakota State	16–7	9–3	1st	
2021–22	South Dakota State	30–5	18–0	1st	NCAA Division I Round of 64
2022–23	South Dakota State	19–13	13–5	2nd	
2023–24	South Dakota State	22–13	12–4	1st	NCAA Division I Round of 64
2024–25	South Dakota State	20–12	11–5	3rd	
South Dakota State:		129–60 (.683)	76–20 (.792)		
Drake Bulldogs (Missouri Valley Conference) (2025–present)
2025–26	Drake	14–20	6–14	9th	
2026–27	Drake	0–0	0–0		
Drake:		14–20 (.412)	6–14 (.300)		
Total:		143–80 (.641)			
National champion Postseason invitational champion Conference regular season champion Conference regular season and conference tournament champion Division regular season champion Division regular season and conference tournament champion Conference tournament champion
