= John Tauer =

American psychologist, professor and basketball coach (born 1972)

Current position
- Title: Head coach
- Team: St. Thomas
- Conference: Summit League
- Record: 315–117 (.729)

Biographical details
- Born: September 18, 1972 (age 54)

Playing career
- 1991–1995: St. Thomas

Coaching career (HC unless noted)
- 2000–2011: St. Thomas (assistant)
- 2011–present: St. Thomas

Head coaching record
- Overall: 315–117 (.729)
- Tournaments: 15–6 (NCAA DIII); 0–1 (NIT)

Accomplishments and honors

Championships
- NCAA Division III National Champion (2016); 8x MIAC Regular Season (2011–2017, 2018–2020); 4x MIAC Tournament (2011–2013, 2014–2016)

Johnny Tauer (born September 18, 1972) is an American psychologist, professor, and basketball coach. He is the current head coach of the St. Thomas Tommies men's basketball team.

== Playing career ==
Tauer played collegiately under Steve Fritz at St. Thomas, where he was an all-MIAC selection his senior year, and part of the Tommies 1994 NCAA Division III Final Four team. He ranks 14th in school history in scoring, 15th in rebounding and is sixth all time in MIAC history in three-point baskets.

== Coaching career ==
After earning his doctorate in social psychology the University of Wisconsin–Madison, Tauer returned to St. Thomas as a professor and assistant men's basketball coach under Fritz. Upon Fritz's retirement in 2011 after the Tommies' 2011 NCAA Division III men's basketball tournament title win, Tauer was elevated to head coach on an interim basis before earning the job permanently.

As a member of the Tommies staff as an assistant or head coach, Tauer has guided the team to 12-straight MIAC championships from 2005 to 2017, and won a share of 14 of the last 15 MIAC regular season titles along with 14 NCAA tournament appearances, including a national title in 2016. Tauer lead the Tommies into the Division I ranks as St. Thomas joined the Summit League for the 2021–22 season.

== Personal life ==
Tauer is a tenured professor of psychology at St. Thomas.

== Head coaching record ==
Record table
Season	Team	Overall	Conference	Standing	Postseason
St. Thomas Tommies (MIAC) (2011–2021)
2011–12	St. Thomas	22–7	16–4	1st	NCAA DIII Second Round
2012–13	St. Thomas	30–2	19–1	1st	NCAA DIII Final Four
2013–14	St. Thomas	22–6	18–2	1st	NCAA DIII First Round
2014–15	St. Thomas	24–4	17–3	1st	NCAA DIII First Round
2015–16	St. Thomas	30–3	18–2	1st	NCAA DIII National Champion
2016–17	St. Thomas	19–8	15–5	1st	NCAA DIII First Round
2017–18	St. Thomas	14–12	12–8	6th	
2018–19	St. Thomas	24–5	18–2	1st	NCAA DIII Sweet Sixteen
2019–20	St. Thomas	26–3	19–1	T–1st	NCAA DIII Sweet Sixteen
2020–21	St. Thomas	7–0	5–0	1st^{†}	
St. Thomas Tommies (Summit League) (2021–present)
2021–22	St. Thomas	10–20	4–14	T–8th	
2022–23	St. Thomas	19–14	9–9	T–4th	
2023–24	St. Thomas	20–13	9–7	4th	
2024–25	St. Thomas	24–10	12–4	2nd	
2025–26	St. Thomas	24–10	12–4	2nd	NIT First Round
2026–27	St. Thomas	0–0	0–0		
St. Thomas:		315–117 (.729)	194–64 (.752)		
Total:		315–117 (.729)			
National champion Postseason invitational champion Conference regular season champion Conference regular season and conference tournament champion Division regular season champion Division regular season and conference tournament champion Conference tournament champion

†Although they were atop the MIAC standings at the time the 2020–21 season was cut short due to the COVID-19 pandemic, the MIAC is not officially recognizing a regular season champion.
