= Kirkwood Community College =

Public college in Cedar Rapids, Iowa, US

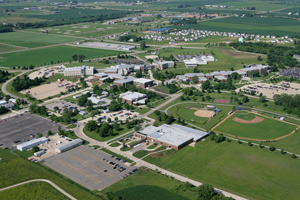
- Aerial view of Kirkwood campus
- Type: Public community college
- Established: 1966
- President: Kristie Fisher
- Location: Cedar Rapids, Iowa, United States; 41°54′40″N 91°39′6″W
- Colors: Blue/White
- Mascot: Eagles
- Website: www.kirkwood.edu

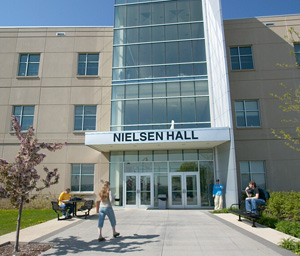
Nielsen Hall on Main Campus in Cedar Rapids

Kirkwood Community College is a public community college in Cedar Rapids, Iowa with several additional regional and county centers located in Belle Plaine, Coralville, Hiawatha, Monticello, Tipton, Vinton, Washington and Williamsburg.

== History ==
Area Ten Community College opened in several locations in Cedar Rapids in 1966, serving an enrollment of 199 students. In 1969, the college officially changed its name to Kirkwood Community College, after Samuel J. Kirkwood, an early abolitionist and Iowa's American Civil War Governor.

In 2018, the college named Dr. Lori Sundberg as the school's fifth president and the first woman to hold the position. The student enrollment during the 2018-2019 year was 16,781, with an average class size of 21, and 330 international students from 100 countries.

== Academics ==
Kirkwood Community College is accredited by the Higher Learning Commission (HLC). Kirkwood offers over 120 different degrees, diplomas, and certifications. Kirkwood also offers a program in 47 high schools throughout Iowa for high school students to obtain college credits during their junior and senior years.

== Athletics ==
The Kirkwood Eagles athletic programs consist of men's and women's basketball, baseball, softball, volleyball, and men's golf. The college is a member of the National Junior College Athletic Association (NJCAA), competing in the Iowa Community College Athletic Conference (ICCAC). Kirkwood's colors are blue and white, and its mascot is an eagle named "Sammy".
