= Sanford Coyote Sports Center =

Arena in Vermillion, South Dakota

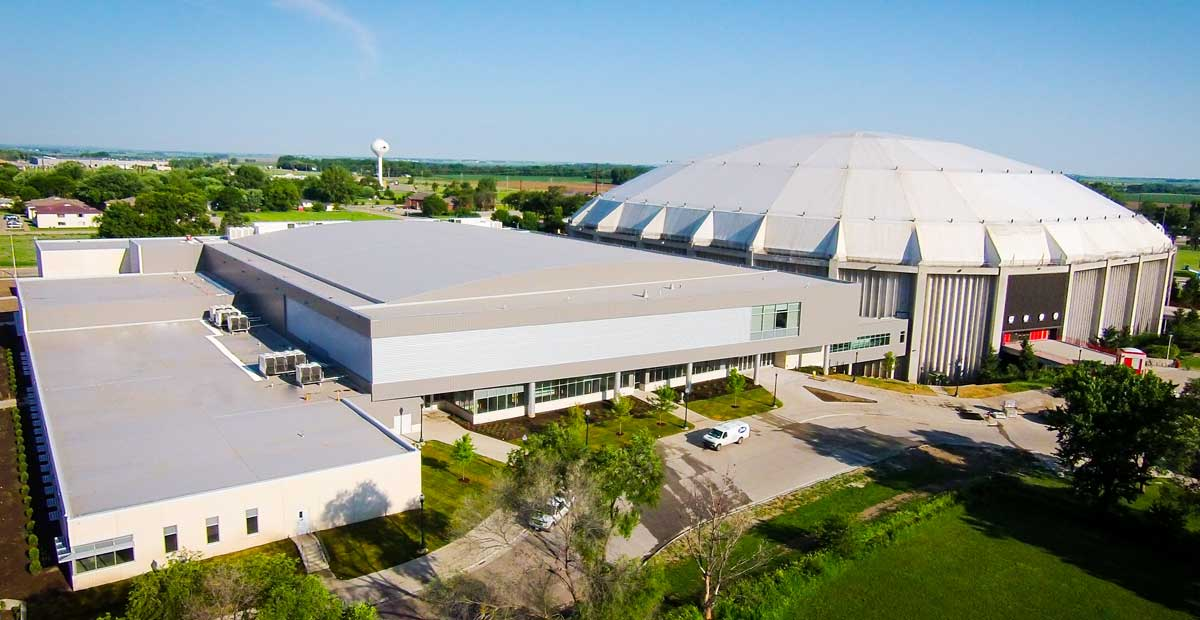

- Location in South Dakota Location in the United States
- Location: N. Dakota St. Vermillion, SD 57069
- Coordinates: 42°47′24.4″N 96°55′40.1″W
- Owner: University of South Dakota
- Operator: University of South Dakota
- Capacity: 6,000

Construction
- Opened: August 30, 2016
- Cost: $73 million

Tenants
- South Dakota men's basketball (2016– ) South Dakota women's basketball (2016– ) South Dakota volleyball (2016– )

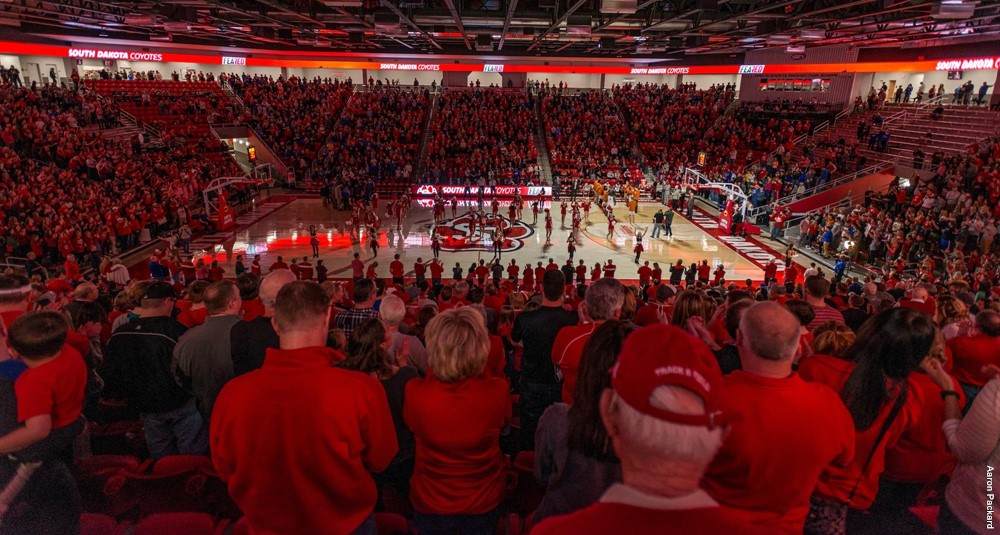
Court view inside the arena.

The Sanford Coyote Sports Center is an indoor arena located on the campus of the University of South Dakota (USD) in Vermillion, South Dakota. The facility opened in 2016 and hosts the university's men's basketball, women's basketball, and women's volleyball teams. It has a seating capacity of 6,000. The center is named after a major supporter of the athletic program, Sanford Health, which donated $20 million to help with construction of the facility.

The facility is connected to the DakotaDome, which had previously been home to all of the new arena's main tenants and remains home to Coyote football, track & field, and swimming & diving. In addition to the main arena, it houses athletic department offices, training and meeting facilities, two practice courts, a video production room that controls display boards at all USD sports venues, and an area set aside for future expansion of the USD occupational and physical therapy programs. Additionally, it includes luxury boxes that allow their fans to watch events at both the Sanford Coyote Sports Center and DakotaDome.

The first event in the new arena was a Coyote volleyball match against North Dakota on August 30, 2016, with the Coyotes winning 3–1 by sets.

== See also ==
- List of NCAA Division I basketball arenas
