= Western Hall =

Multi-purpose arena in Macomb, Illinois

- Interactive map of Western Hall
- Location: Macomb, Illinois
- Coordinates: 40.471589°N 90.685201°W
- Owner: Western Illinois University
- Operator: Western Illinois Athletics
- Capacity: 5,139
- Surface: Hardwood
- Public transit: Go West Transit

Construction
- Opened: 1964

Tenant
- Western Illinois Leathernecks (NCAA)

LeRoy A. Ufkes Court at Western Hall is a 5,139-seat multi-purpose arena in Macomb, Illinois. It was built in 1964. It is home to the Western Illinois University Leathernecks men's and women's basketball teams and the women's volleyball team.

== History and features ==
Completed in 1964, its stadium-style seats, combined with bleachers in the upper levels, accommodate 5,139 fans surrounding the maple wood floor.

The playing surface in Western Hall has undergone several changes in its history. Originally a wooden floor, the regulation-size court was replaced with a tartan floor in 1973 and, prior to the 1993-94 basketball season, upgraded with a parquet floor similar to that in the old Boston Garden. In 2014, the parquet floor was replaced with a maple wood floor. The court is surrounded by a Chem-turf jogging track.

The building underwent massive construction in 1997 with the addition of the $8 million Student Recreation Center to its south. The SRC serves as host to all intramural and club sports, and houses a swimming pool, racquetball courts, suspended jogging track and state-of-the-art exercise equipment.

In the summer of 1999, the court received a face lift with a new floor design featuring Rocky, the WIU mascot, and it was refinished during the summer of 2000. The latest addition to Western Hall, a new training facility for all WIU athletic programs and locker room for the Leatherneck football program which was added onto the East Arena, was completed in July 2000.

== Events ==
Besides serving as the home for varsity basketball and volleyball, Western Hall houses numerous athletic and physical education activities and many major Bureau of Cultural Affairs events, including concerts, musicals and multi-cultural entertainment events for all ages. One of the highlights of the 1999-2000 BCA season was an appearance by Bill Cosby.

== See also ==
- Western Illinois Leathernecks men's basketball
- Western Illinois Leathernecks women's basketball
- Western Illinois Leathernecks
- List of NCAA Division I basketball arenas
