= List of Omaha Mavericks men's basketball head coaches =

The following is a list of Omaha Mavericks men's basketball head coaches. There have been 22 head coaches of the Mavericks in their 110-season history.

Omaha's current head coach is Chris Crutchfield. He was hired as the Mavericks' head coach in March 2022, replacing Derrin Hansen, who was fired following the 2021–22 season.

No.	Tenure	Coach	Years	Record	Pct.
1	1910–1912 (Note: There are no records available for these seasons.)	Gus Miller	2	–	–
2	1912–1913	Dutch Nagle	1	3–2	.600
3	1913–1916 (Note: There are no records available for the 1913–14 season.)	Jim Meyers	3	9–5	.643
4	1918–1919	Ed Evans	1	1–12	.077
5	1919–1927	Ernie Adams	8	58–34	.630
6	1927–1929	Lloyd M. Bradfield	2	3–27	.100
7	1929–1931	Bill Graves	2	8–21	.276
8	1931–1935	Cecil L. Hartman	4	56–12	.824
9	1935–1938	Johnny Baker	3	10–30	.250
10	1938–1941; 1943–1944	Stu Baller	4	35–29	.547
11	1941–1943; 1945–1948	Harold Johnk	5	30–60	.333
12	1948–1952	Don Pflasterer	4	40–46	.465
13	1952–1955	Virgil Yelkin	3	40–33	.548
14	1955–1959	Jack Cotton	4	27–85	.241
15	1959–1961	Sonny Means	2	7–37	.159
16	1961–1969	Jim Borsheim	8	73–101	.420
17	1969–1994	Bob Hanson	25	382–313	.550
18	1994–1995	Tim Carter	1	11–16	.407
19	1995–2001	Kevin Lehman	6	72–91	.442
20	2001–2005	Kevin McKenna	4	89–33	.730
21	2005–2022	Derrin Hansen	17	253–260	.493
22	2022–present	Chris Crutchfield	1	9–23	.281
Totals		22 coaches	110 seasons	1,216–1,270	.489
Records updated through end of 2022–23 season Source
