= 2021–22 NCAA Division I men's basketball season =

Basketball season

- Preseason AP No. 1: Gonzaga Bulldogs
- Regular season: November 9, 2021 – March 13, 2022
- NCAA Tournament: 2022
- Tournament dates: March 15 – April 4, 2022
- National Championship: Caesars Superdome; New Orleans, Louisiana
- NCAA Champions: Kansas Jayhawks
- Other champions: Xavier Musketeers (NIT), UNC Wilmington Seahawks (CBI); Fresno State Bulldogs (TBC)
- Player of the Year (Naismith, Wooden): Oscar Tshiebwe, Kentucky Wildcats

The 2021–22 NCAA Division I men's basketball season began on November 9, 2021 and concluded on March 13, 2022. The 2022 NCAA Division I men's basketball tournament culminated the season and began on March 15 and concluded on April 4 with the championship game at the Caesars Superdome in New Orleans, Louisiana.

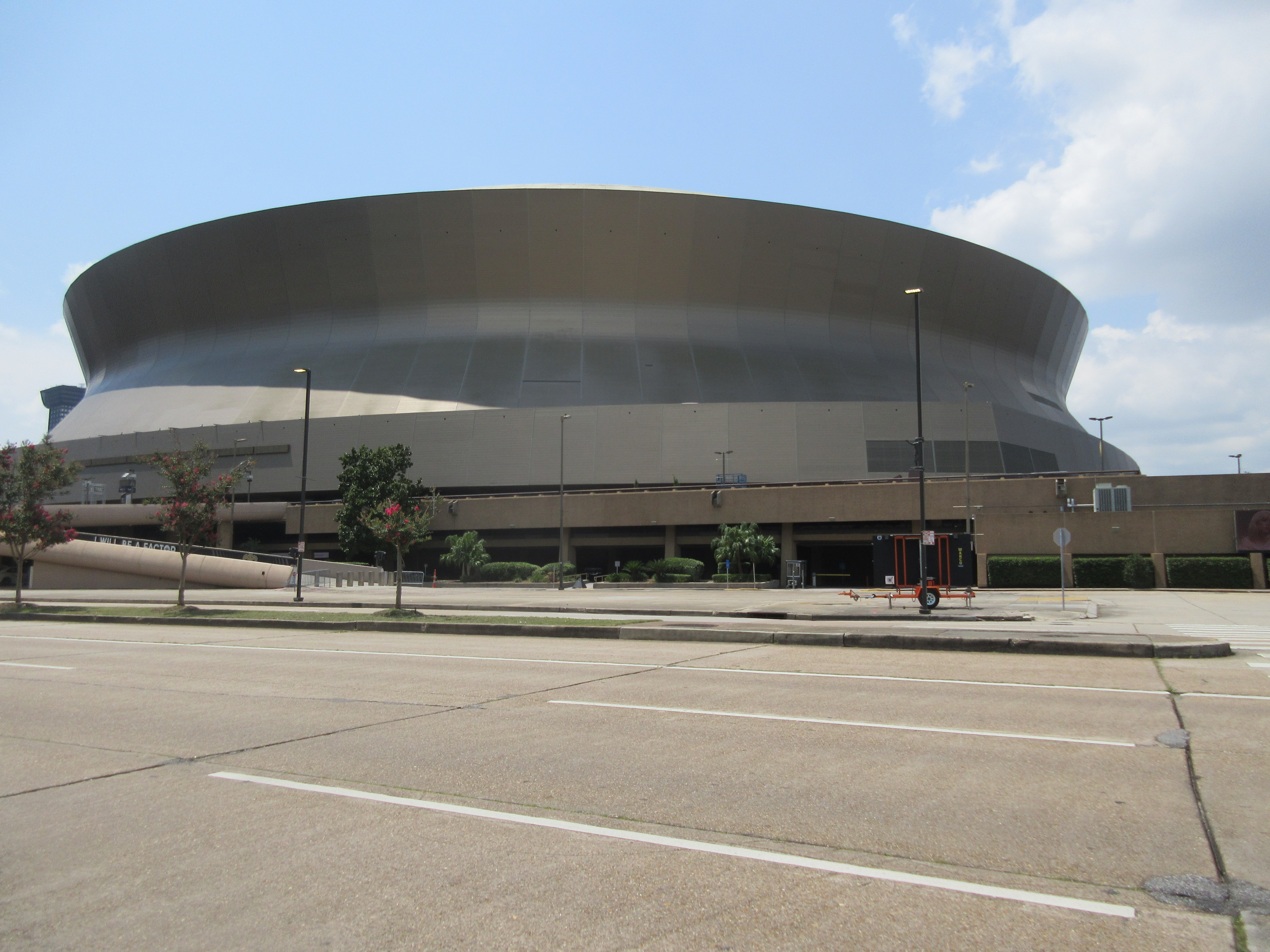
Caesars Superdome in New Orleans, Louisiana, hosted the NCAA men's Final Four.

== Rule changes ==
Following the Supreme Court of the United States June 2021 ruling in the National Collegiate Athletic Association v. Alston case, student athlete compensation, such as payment for name, image and likeness (NIL), became permissible for NCAA scholarship athletes on July 1, 2021.

The following rule changes have been recommended by the NCAA Basketball Rules Committee to the Playing Rules Oversight Panel for the 2021–22 season:

- Flopping can result in a technical foul.
- Increase to six personal fouls before disqualification, with a maximum of four fouls allowed per half (experimental in NIT for 2022). If a player commits four personal fouls in a single half they will be disqualified for the remainder of the game.
- Allowance at the league level for coaches to use technology, live statistics and video on the bench.
- Team timeouts can serve as/replace media timeouts (e.g., team calls timeout at the 18-minute mark in a half, that would be used as the under-16-minute media timeout).
- Shot clocks will now be able to display tenths of a second, similar to the NBA.

== Season headlines ==
Two of the most significant developments impacting the 2021–22 season took place before the end of the 2020–21 school year, with one occurring before the start of the 2020–21 basketball season.

- On October 14, 2020, the NCAA announced that all student-athletes in winter sports during the 2020–21 school year, including men's and women's basketball, would receive an extra year of athletic eligibility.
- On April 15, 2021, the NCAA Division I Council adopted legislation that extended the so-called "one-time transfer exception" to all D-I sports, with the Division I Board of Directors ratifying this on April 28. This allows student-athletes in baseball, men's and women's basketball, football, and men's ice hockey to transfer one time without having to sit out a year, placing them under the same transfer regulations that previously applied to all other D-I sports.

Other news:

- May 6 – The University of Hartford's governing board voted to begin the process of transitioning the school's athletic program from Division I to NCAA Division III. The plan calls for the following steps:
  - January 2022: Formal request for reclassification with the NCAA
  - 2022–23: No athletic scholarships will be awarded to incoming students.
  - 2023–24: Become a provisional member in a D-III conference to be determined; transition remaining students off athletic scholarships by the end of that school year
  - 2024–25: Become a full member of the aforementioned D-III conference
  - 2025–26: Full D-III membership
- May 18 – The office of the U.S. Attorney for the Western District of Kentucky released an indictment of former Louisville assistant Dino Gaudio for attempted extortion. The indictment accused Gaudio, whose contract with Louisville was not renewed after the 2020–21 season, of threatening to report NCAA rules violations in the Louisville program to media unless he received an additional 17 months of salary. Gaudio would plead guilty on June 4 and was sentenced to a year of probation and a $10,000 fine on August 27. In fallout from the case, Louisville suspended head coach Chris Mack without pay for the first 6 games of the 2021–22 season. The university concluded that he failed to follow its guidelines and procedures in relation to the incident.
- July 30 – Oklahoma and Texas formally accepted invitations to join the Southeastern Conference following the 2024–25 season.
- September 3 – Multiple media outlets reported that the Big 12 was on the verge of inviting four schools—American Athletic Conference members Cincinnati, Houston, and UCF, plus BYU, a West Coast Conference member and an FBS independent in football. All four schools were reportedly preparing membership applications, and their future entrance could be approved as early as the next scheduled meeting of Big 12 presidents on September 10. The entry timeline was uncertain at the time of the report, but would most likely be in 2024, and on September 10 the four schools were officially announced as incoming Big 12 members no later than 2024–25.
- October 21 – Six Conference USA members were announced as incoming members of The American Athletic Conference at a future date—Charlotte, Florida Atlantic, North Texas, Rice, UAB, and UTSA.
- October 22 – The Action Network reported that C-USA member Southern Miss had accepted an invitation to join the Sun Belt Conference in 2023, though no formal announcement had then been made. The report added that the Sun Belt was preparing to add two other C-USA members, Marshall and Old Dominion, as well as Colonial Athletic Association member James Madison. At the time, some formal announcements of new members were expected on October 25, but a Marshall announcement was likely to wait until after announcing its new president on October 28. The report also indicated that the Sun Belt would expel its two full non-football members, Little Rock and UT Arlington, after the 2022–23 season.
- October 25 – The Associated Press preseason All-American team was released. Gonzaga forward Drew Timme was the lone unanimous selection (63 votes). Joining him on the team were Illinois center Kofi Cockburn, UCLA guard Johnny Juzang, Villanova guard Collin Gillespie, and Indiana forward Trayce Jackson-Davis.
- October 26 – Southern Miss was officially announced as a Sun Belt member, effective no later than July 2023. In other Sun Belt realignment news, it was reported that Old Dominion's arrival would be announced later that week, and that James Madison's board had scheduled an emergency meeting on October 29 (presumably to discuss a Sun Belt invitation).
- October 27 – Old Dominion was officially announced as a Sun Belt member, also effective no later than July 2023. This marked ODU's return to that conference after an absence of more than 30 years.
- October 30 – The day after both the Sun Belt Conference and Marshall issued tweets indicating that the Thundering Herd had accepted a Sun Belt invitation, this move was officially announced.
- November 5 – Conference USA, which had nine of its schools depart to other conferences, announced that ASUN Conference members Jacksonville State and Liberty and Western Athletic Conference members New Mexico State and Sam Houston would join C-USA no later than July 2023.
- November 6 – James Madison made its move to the Sun Belt official, initially effective no later than July 2023.
- November 12
  - The WAC announced that Incarnate Word would join from the Southland Conference in July 2022.
  - Utah governor Spencer Cox signed a bill passed by the Utah State Legislature that changed the name of Dixie State University to Utah Tech University, effective in the 2022–23 school year. The nickname of Trailblazers will not be affected.
- November 16
  - The Atlantic 10 Conference announced that Loyola Chicago would join from the Missouri Valley Conference after the 2021–22 season.
  - CBS Sports reported that the MVC had entered into talks with three schools regarding future membership—Summit League member Kansas City, Ohio Valley Conference member Murray State, and non-football Sun Belt member UT Arlington. The report indicated that the latter two schools were seen as the strongest candidates, but all three were likely to receive invitations in the coming months.
- December 9 – The other Sun Belt member without a football program, Little Rock, announced that it would join the Ohio Valley Conference on July 1, 2022.
- January 7 – Murray State was announced as a new member of the MVC, effective July 1.
- January 21 – UT Arlington announced it would return to the WAC, in which it had been a member in the 2012–13 school year, effective July 1.
- January 25 – The Colonial Athletic Association announced that it would add three members effective that July—Big South Conference member Hampton, Metro Atlantic Athletic Conference member Monmouth, and Stony Brook, already a CAA football member and otherwise in the America East Conference.
- January 26 – UIC was announced as a new member of the MVC, effective July 1.
- February 2 – The Sun Belt and James Madison both reported the latter's admission to the conference is on July 1, rather than 2023.
- February 7 – The University of Southern Indiana, currently a member of the Division II Great Lakes Valley Conference, announced that it would begin a transition to Division I in 2022–23, with a D-I conference affiliation to be announced in the coming days. A committee report issued in January indicated three leagues believed to be the ASUN Conference, Horizon League, and Ohio Valley Conference were possible landing spots.
- February 9 – Southern Indiana was announced as a new member of the OVC, effective July 1.
- February 11 – Marshall, Old Dominion, and Southern Miss, which were initially announced as moving from C-USA to the Sun Belt no later than 2023, jointly announced that they intended to leave C-USA in July 2022. All three schools claimed that in December 2021, they had notified C-USA of their intent to leave C-USA after the 2021–22 school year, but that C-USA did not attempt to negotiate a resolution to this issue. C-USA had stated in late January that it expected the three departing schools to remain in the conference through 2022–23.
- February 20 – Michigan head coach Juwan Howard, upset with a time-out called by Wisconsin head coach Greg Gard as Wisconsin was leading by an insurmountable margin with about 30 seconds remaining, took a swing at a Wisconsin assistant coach in the handshake line after the game ended. It resulted in a brawl in which police officers had to separate players and coaches from both teams. The next day, Howard was suspended for the final five games of Michigan's regular season, with associate head coach Phil Martelli serving as interim head coach during Howard's suspension. Michigan players Moussa Diabaté and Terrance Williams II, as well as Wisconsin player Jahcobi Neath, all also received one-game suspensions for their roles in the brawl.
- February 22 – The Colonial Athletic Association announced that North Carolina A&T would join from the Big South Conference on July 1. (The football team will join the CAA football league, legally a separate entity, in 2023.)
- February 23
  - Marshall filed suit in its local court against C-USA in an attempt to make its planned move to the Sun Belt Conference in July 2022.
  - The OVC announced the July 2022 entry of another Division II upgrader, Lindenwood.
- March 1 – While not directly related to basketball, the Sun Belt Conference's release of its 2022 football schedule notably included all three schools set to move from C-USA (Marshall, Old Dominion, Southern Miss). The SBC release did not mention the ongoing dispute between C-USA and the three schools, or the prospect of those schools being unable to join for the 2022–23 school year.
- March 5 – Duke head coach Mike Krzyzewski coached his final home game at Cameron Indoor Stadium, the culmination of a 42-year career at the school. Over 90 former Duke players attended the game in a 94–81 loss to rival North Carolina. The average sold ticket price to attend the game was over $6,000—more than the average price for a Super Bowl LVI ticket.
- March 29
  - Conference USA, Marshall, Old Dominion, and Southern Miss issued a joint statement that all parties had reached a settlement that will allow the three schools to join the Sun Belt Conference in July 2022.
  - The America East Conference announced that Bryant would join from the Northeast Conference on July 1, 2022.
- April 5 – The Northeast Conference announced the addition of current Division II member Stonehill, effective July 1, 2022.
- May 2 – Mount St. Mary's announced they would join the Metro Atlantic beginning July 1, 2022.
- May 6 – Queens University of Charlotte, a member of the Division II South Atlantic Conference, announced they would be joining the ASUN on July 1, 2022.

=== Milestones and records ===
- During the season, the following players reached the 2,000 career point milestone – UConn guard R. J. Cole, Richmond forward Grant Golden, Hofstra guard Zach Cooks, Appalachian State guard Justin Forrest, Arizona State guard Marreon Jackson, Stony Brook guard Jahlil Jenkins, Washington State guard Michael Flowers, Texas Tech forward Bryson Williams, UAB guard Michael Ertel, Weber State guard Koby McEwen, Maryland guard Fatts Russell, Loyola Marymount swingman Eli Scott, Iowa guard Jordan Bohannon, Richmond guard Jacob Gilyard, North Carolina forward Brady Manek, and Kansas guard Remy Martin.
  - Additionally, Golden collected his 1,000th rebound in Richmond's Atlantic 10 tournament semifinal win over Dayton, becoming the first player to hit the career 2,000 point, 1,000 rebound mark in the season.
- November 18 — Iowa guard Jordan Bohannon set the Big Ten record for career three-point field goals when he hit his 375th in a game against Alabama State. Bohannon passed Ohio State's Jon Diebler.
- December 4 — Alabama became the first program ever to defeat top 5 teams in both football and basketball on the same day. The Crimson Tide football team defeated top-ranked Georgia in the 2021 SEC Championship Game 41–24 and then later the basketball team beat third-ranked Gonzaga 91–82 in Seattle.
- December 5 – Richmond guard Jacob Gilyard set the new all-time NCAA Division I career steals record, securing his 386th steal to surpass Providence's John Linehan (385), whose record had stood since 2002.
  - On December 22, he became the first Division I player to reach 400 steals in a win over Bucknell.
- December 6 – Purdue ascended to the No. 1 national ranking in the AP Poll for the first time in program history.
- January 6 – In Iowa's 87–78 loss at Wisconsin, Jordan Bohannon appeared in his 158th career game, surpassing the all-time Division I men's record previously held by Ohio State's David Lighty from 2006 to 2011.
- January 15 – Liberty's Darius McGhee scored a school-record 48 points, including 37 in the second half, in a 78–75 win against Florida Gulf Coast.
- January 24 – Auburn climbed to No. 1 in the AP Poll for the first time in program history.
- February 5–16 – With wins over Michigan State, Ohio State, Wisconsin, and Illinois, Rutgers became the first unranked team in D-I men's history to defeat ranked teams in four consecutive regular-season games.
- February 26 – All of the top six teams in the AP poll (Gonzaga, Arizona, Auburn, Purdue, Kansas, and Kentucky) lost, as well as No. 9 Texas Tech. This broke the previous record of six AP top-10 teams losing on the same day, and was also the first time in the history of the AP Poll that the top six teams lost on the same day.
- March 8 – Bellarmine won the ASUN tournament, defeating Jacksonville 77–72. The Knights, in their second year of a four-year transition from Division II, will be ineligible for the NCAA tournament or NIT until the 2024–25 season; under ASUN rules, the conference's automatic bid went to Jacksonville State, which had the best regular-season conference record. Bellarmine became the first D-I men's team in at least the last 25 years to win its conference tournament while being ineligible for the NCAA tournament.

== Conference membership changes ==
Eleven schools joined new conferences, including a school transitioning from Division III.

School	Former conference	New conference
Abilene Christian	Southland Conference	Western Athletic Conference
Bethune–Cookman	Mid-Eastern Athletic Conference	Southwestern Athletic Conference
Central Arkansas	Southland Conference	ASUN Conference
Eastern Kentucky	Ohio Valley Conference	ASUN Conference
Florida A&M	Mid-Eastern Athletic Conference	Southwestern Athletic Conference
Jacksonville State	Ohio Valley Conference	ASUN Conference
Lamar	Southland Conference	Western Athletic Conference
North Carolina A&T	Mid-Eastern Athletic Conference	Big South Conference
St. Thomas	Minnesota Intercollegiate Athletic Conference (D-III)	Summit League
Sam Houston	Southland Conference	Western Athletic Conference
Stephen F. Austin	Southland Conference	Western Athletic Conference

The 2021–22 season was the last for 21 Division I schools in their then-current conferences. Five NCAA Division II schools started transitions to D-I after the season.

- Austin Peay moved from the Ohio Valley Conference (OVC) and Queens (NC) also moved from the South Atlantic Conference (D-II) to the ASUN Conference (ASUN).
- Belmont and Murray State, both OVC members, and UIC of the Horizon League left for the Missouri Valley Conference (MVC).
- Bryant left the Northeast Conference (NEC) for the America East.
- Chicago State left the Western Athletic Conference (WAC), becoming an independent for the time being.
- Hampton, Monmouth, North Carolina A&T, and Stony Brook left their respective conferences (Hampton, NCAT: Big South; Monmouth: MAAC; Stony Brook: America East) for the Colonial Athletic Association.
- Hartford left the America East as part of its ongoing transition to Division III, becoming an independent for 2022–23. It eventually found a D-III home in the Commonwealth Coast Conference, which it joins in July 2023.
- Four schools joined the Sun Belt Conference (SBC)—James Madison from the CAA, and Marshall, Old Dominion, and Southern Miss from Conference USA.
- Lamar, which had previously announced that it would leave the WAC in 2023 to return to the Southland Conference, accelerated this move to 2022–23.
- Lindenwood, Little Rock, and Southern Indiana left their respective conferences (Lindenwood, Southern Indiana: D-II Great Lakes Valley Conference; Little Rock: SBC) for the OVC.
- Loyola Chicago left the MVC for the Atlantic 10 Conference.
- Mount St. Mary's left the NEC for the Metro Atlantic Athletic Conference (MAAC).
- Southern Utah and UT Arlington, respectively, left the Big Sky Conference and SBC for the WAC. Incarnate Word had announced a move to the WAC, but backed out of that plan and remained in the Southland.
- Stonehill left the D-II Northeast-10 Conference (NE-10) for the NEC.
- Texas A&M–Commerce left the D-II Lone Star Conference for the Southland Conference.

== Arenas ==
=== New arenas ===
- This was the first season for High Point at the 4,500-seat Qubein Center (full name: Nido and Mariana Qubein Arena and Conference Center). The new arena was originally intended to open for the 2020–21 season, but was delayed due to COVID-19 issues. The facility officially opened on the weekend of September 24–26; the first sports event was a men's basketball exhibition against Division II Mount Olive on November 4, 2021. The regular-season opener was a men's and women's doubleheader against nearby Elon on November 9.
- This was the first season for Idaho at the new 4,200-seat Idaho Central Credit Union Arena. The first event in the new arena was an exhibition against NAIA Evergreen State on October 29. The first regular-season game was the season opener against Long Beach State on November 10, 2021, won by The Beach 95–89 in overtime. The game served as a homecoming for The Beach's head coach Dan Monson, who played football at Idaho before an injury ended his playing career and is the son of Vandals coaching legend Don Monson.

=== Arenas of new D-I teams ===
- St. Thomas plays at its existing on-campus facility, Schoenecker Arena (capacity 1,800).

=== Arenas closing ===
The following D-I programs planned to open new arenas for the 2022–23 season. All will move within their current campuses unless otherwise indicated.

- Alabama A&M will leave Elmore Gymnasium for the new Alabama A&M Events Center; the venue is scheduled to open in July 2022.
- Austin Peay planned to leave the on-campus Winfield Dunn Center for the new F&M Bank Arena in downtown Clarksville, Tennessee. However, construction delays led to this move being put off until 2023–24.
- Georgia State will leave GSU Sports Arena for a facility tentatively named Georgia State Convocation Center.
- Texas will leave the Frank Erwin Center, which will be demolished to accommodate an expansion of the university's medical school, for the Moody Center.
- Vermont will leave Patrick Gymnasium for the Tarrant Event Center.

== Season outlook ==
The top 25 from the AP and USA Today Coaches polls.

=== Pre-season polls ===
AP
Ranking	Team
1	Gonzaga (55)
2	UCLA (8)
3	Kansas
4	Villanova
5	Texas
6	Michigan
7	Purdue
8	Baylor
9	Duke
10	Kentucky
11	Illinois
12	Memphis
13	Oregon
14	Alabama
15	Houston
16	Arkansas
17	Ohio State
18	Tennessee
19	North Carolina
20	Florida State
21	Maryland
22	Auburn
23	St. Bonaventure
24	Connecticut
25	Virginia

USA Today Coaches
Ranking	Team
1	Gonzaga (29)
2	UCLA (2)
3	Kansas
4	Villanova
5	Texas
6	Michigan
7	Purdue
8	Baylor
9	Duke
10	Illinois
11	Kentucky
12	Oregon
13	Alabama
14	Houston
15	Arkansas
16	Memphis
17	Tennesseeт; Ohio Stateт
19	Florida State
20	North Carolina
21	Maryland
22	Auburn
23	Connecticut
24	St. Bonaventure
25	Virginia

=== Final polls ===
AP
Ranking	Team
1	Gonzaga (54)
2	Arizona (7)
3	Kansas
4	Baylor
5	Tennessee
6	Villanova
7	Kentucky
8	Auburn
9	Duke
10	Purdue
11	UCLA
12	Texas Tech
13	Providence
14	Wisconsin
15	Houston
16	Iowa
17	Arkansas
18	Saint Mary's
19	Illinois
20	Murray State
21	Connecticut
22	Southern California
23	Boise State
24	Colorado State
25	Texas

USA Today Coaches
Ranking	Team
1	Kansas (32)
2	North Carolina
3	Duke
4	Villanova
5	Gonzaga
6	Arizona
7	Houston
8	Arkansas
9	Baylor
10	Purdue
11	UCLA
12	Texas Tech
13	Providence
14	Auburn
15	Tennessee
16т	Miami (FL)
16т	Kentucky
18	Wisconsin
19	Illinois
20	Saint Mary's
21	Iowa
22	Murray State
23	Iowa State
24	Saint Peter's
25	Michigan

== Regular season top 10 matchups ==
Rankings reflect the AP poll Top 25.

- November 9
  - No. 9 Duke defeated No. 10 Kentucky, 79–71 (Champions Classic, Madison Square Garden, New York, NY)
- November 12
  - No. 2 UCLA defeated No. 4 Villanova, 86–77^{OT} (Pauley Pavilion, Los Angeles, CA)
- November 13
  - No. 1 Gonzaga defeated No. 5 Texas, 86–74 (McCarthey Athletic Center Spokane, WA)
- November 21
  - No. 6 Purdue defeated No. 5 Villanova, 80–74 (Hall of Fame Tip Off, Mohegan Sun Arena, Uncasville, CT)
- November 23
  - No. 1 Gonzaga defeated No. 2 UCLA, 83–63 (Empire Classic, T-Mobile Arena, Las Vegas, NV)
- November 26
  - No. 5 Duke defeated No. 1 Gonzaga, 84–81 (Continental Tire Challenge, T-Mobile Arena, Las Vegas, NV)
- December 12
  - No. 2 Baylor defeated No. 6 Villanova, 57–36 (Ferrell Center, Waco, TX)
- January 1
  - No. 1 Baylor defeated No. 8 Iowa State, 77–72 (Hilton Coliseum, Ames, IA)
- January 25
  - No. 7 UCLA defeated No. 3 Arizona, 75–59 (Pauley Pavilion, Los Angeles, CA)
- February 3
  - No. 7 Arizona defeated No. 3 UCLA, 76–66 (McKale Center, Tucson, AZ)
- February 5
  - No. 10 Kansas defeated No. 8 Baylor, 83–59 (Allen Fieldhouse, Lawrence, KS)
- February 15
  - No. 10 Villanova defeated No. 8 Providence, 89–84 (Dunkin' Donuts Center, Providence, RI)
- February 26
  - No. 10 Baylor defeated No. 5 Kansas, 80–70 (Ferrell Center, Waco, TX)
- March 1
  - No. 10 Wisconsin defeated No. 8 Purdue, 70–67 (Kohl Center, Madison, WI)
- March 12
  - No. 9 Tennessee defeated No. 5 Kentucky, 69–62 (2022 SEC men's basketball tournament, Amalie Arena, Tampa, FL)

== Regular season ==
=== Early-season tournaments ===
Names	Dates	Location	No. teams	Champion
Asheville Championship	November 12–14	Harrah's Cherokee Center (Asheville, NC)	4	Minnesota
Charleston Classic	November 18–21	TD Arena (Charleston, SC)	8	St. Bonaventure
Myrtle Beach Invitational	November 18–21	HTC Center (Conway, SC)	8	Utah State
Roman Main Event	November 19–21	T-Mobile Arena (Las Vegas, NV)	4	Arizona
Paradise Jam tournament	November 19–22	Sports and Fitness Center (Saint Thomas, VI)	8	Colorado State
Hall of Fame Tip Off	November 20–21	Mohegan Sun Arena (Uncasville, CT)	4	Purdue
Sunshine Slam	November 20–21	Ocean Center (Daytona Beach, FL)	8	Utah (A Bracket); Air Force (B Bracket)
Jacksonville Classic	November 20–22	UNF Arena (Jacksonville, FL)	8	Florida State (Duval Bracket); Boston University (Jax Bracket)
Legends Classic	November 22–23	Prudential Center (Newark, NJ)	4	Virginia
Hall of Fame Classic	November 22–23	T-Mobile Center (Kansas City, MO)	4	Arkansas
Gulf Coast Showcase	November 22–24	Hertz Arena (Estero, FL)	8	Oakland
Nassau Championship	November 22–24	Baha Mar Convention Center (Nassau, Bahamas)	4	Toledo
Naples Invitational	November 22–24	Community School of Naples (Naples, FL)	8	East Tennessee State
Maui Invitational	November 22–24	Michelob Ultra Arena (Las Vegas, NV)	8	Wisconsin
Fort Myers Tip-Off	November 22–24	Suncoast Credit Union Arena (Fort Myers, FL)	8	Florida (Beach); Southern Utah (Palms)
SoCal Challenge	November 22–24	The Pavilion at JSerra (San Juan Capistrano, CA)	8	Fresno State (Surf); Utah Valley (Sand)
Cancún Challenge	November 23–24	Moon Palace Golf & Spa Resort (Cancún, MX)	8	Saint Louis (Riviera); Middle Tennessee (Mayan)
Battle 4 Atlantis	November 24–26	Imperial Arena (Paradise Island, Nassau, Bahamas)	8	Baylor
NIT Season Tip-Off	November 24–26	Barclays Center (Brooklyn, NY)	4	Iowa State
ESPN Events Invitational	November 25–28	HP Field House (Lake Buena Vista, FL)	8	Dayton
Las Vegas Classic	November 25–26	Orleans Arena (Las Vegas Valley, NV)	4	South Alabama
Las Vegas Invitational	November 25–26	Orleans Arena (Las Vegas Valley, NV)	4	San Francisco
Bahamas Championship	November 25–27	Baha Mar Convention Center (Nassau, Bahamas)	4	Louisville
Wooden Legacy	November 25–26	Anaheim Convention Center (Anaheim, CA)	4	USC
Emerald Coast Classic	November 26–27	The Arena at NFSC (Niceville, FL)	4	LSU; Samford
Sun Bowl Invitational	December 21–22	Don Haskins Center (El Paso, TX)	4	Bradley
Diamond Head Classic	December 23–25	Stan Sheriff Center (Honolulu, HI)	8	Canceled due to COVID-19 issues
Southland Basketball Tip-Off	January 6–8	Leonard E. Merrell Center (Katy, TX)	8	Southeastern Louisiana

=== Upsets ===
An upset is a victory by an underdog team. In the context of NCAA Division I men's basketball, this generally constitutes an unranked team defeating a team currently ranked in the top 25. This list will highlight those upsets of ranked teams by unranked teams as well as upsets of No. 1 teams. Rankings are from the AP poll. Bold type indicates winning teams in "true road games"—i.e., those played on an opponent's home court (including secondary homes).

Winner	Score	Loser	Date	Tournament/event	Notes
**Navy**	66–58	No. 25 Virginia	November 9, 2021		
Florida	71–55	No. 20 Florida State	November 14, 2021	Rivalry	
Marquette	67–66	No. 10 Illinois	November 15, 2021	Gavitt Tipoff Games	
**Seton Hall**	67–65	No. 4 Michigan	November 16, 2021	Gavitt Tipoff Games	
**BYU**	81–49	No. 12 Oregon	November 16, 2021	Phil Knight Invitational	
**George Mason**	71–66	No. 20 Maryland	November 17, 2021		
Xavier	71–65	No. 19 Ohio State	November 18, 2021	Gavitt Tipoff Games	
Arizona	80–62	No. 4 Michigan	November 21, 2021	Roman Main Event	
Ohio State	79–76	No. 21 Seton Hall	November 22, 2021	Fort Myers Tip-Off	
Cincinnati	71–51	No. 14 Illinois	November 22, 2021	Hall of Fame Classic	
Wisconsin	65–63	No. 12 Houston	November 23, 2021	Maui Invitational	
Iowa State	82–70	No. 25 Xavier	November 24, 2021	NIT Season Tip-Off	
Michigan State	64–60	No. 22 UConn	November 25, 2021	Battle 4 Atlantis	
Iona	72–68	No. 10 Alabama	November 25, 2021	ESPN Events Invitational	First win ever by a MAAC team over an AP top-10 team
Dayton	74–73	No. 4 Kansas	November 26, 2021	ESPN Events Invitational	
Iowa State	78–59	No. 9 Memphis	November 26, 2021	NIT Season Tip-Off	
No. 5 Duke	84–81	No. 1 Gonzaga	November 26, 2021	Continental Tire Challenge	
**Northern Iowa**	90–80	No. 16 St. Bonaventure	November 27, 2021		
Ohio State	71–66	No. 1 Duke	November 30, 2021	ACC–Big Ten Challenge	
Georgia	82–79	No. 18 Memphis	December 1, 2021		
Oklahoma	74–67	No. 14 Florida	December 1, 2021		
North Carolina	72–51	No. 24 Michigan	December 1, 2021	ACC–Big Ten Challenge	
Utah Valley	72–65^{OT}	No. 12 BYU	December 1, 2021	UCCU Crosstown Clash	Utah Valley's first ever win over an AP top-25 team
Ole Miss	67–63	No. 18 Memphis	December 4, 2021	Rivalry	
**Texas Southern**	69–54	No. 20 Florida	December 6, 2021		First SWAC team to upset a ranked SEC team
Texas Tech	57–52^{OT}	No. 13 Tennessee	December 7, 2021	Jimmy V Classic	
West Virginia	56–53	No. 15 UConn	December 8, 2021	Big East–Big 12 Battle	
Rutgers	70–68	No. 1 Purdue	December 9, 2021		First victory over a No. 1 team in program history
Creighton	83–71	No. 24 BYU	December 11, 2021		
Oklahoma	88–66	No. 12 Arkansas	December 11, 2021		
Notre Dame	66–62	No. 10 Kentucky	December 11, 2021		
Maryland	70–68	No. 20 Florida	December 12, 2021	Basketball Hall of Fame Invitational	
Memphis	92–78	No. 6 Alabama	December 14, 2021		
Creighton	79–59	No. 9 Villanova	December 17, 2021		
**Providence**	57–53	No. 20 UConn	December 18, 2021		
Hofstra	89–81	No. 24 Arkansas	December 18, 2021		
Davidson	79–78	No. 10 Alabama	December 21, 2021	C. M. Newton Classic	
Marquette	88–56	No. 16 Providence	January 4, 2022		
Indiana	67–51	No. 13 Ohio State	January 6, 2022		
Oklahoma State	64–51	No. 14 Texas	January 8, 2022		
Missouri	92–86	No. 15 Alabama	January 8, 2022		
San Diego State	79–49	No. 20 Colorado State	January 8, 2022		
Oklahoma	79–66	No. 11 Iowa State	January 8, 2022		
**Miami (FL)**	76–74	No. 2 Duke	January 8, 2022		
Stanford	75–69	No. 5 USC	January 11, 2022		
**No. 19 Texas Tech**	65–62	No. 1 Baylor	January 11, 2022		Baylor loses after being the last undefeated team in Division I
DePaul	96–92	No. 20 Seton Hall	January 13, 2022		
**Oregon**	84–81^{OT}	No. 3 UCLA	January 13, 2022		
Kansas State	62–51	No. 19 Texas Tech	January 15, 2022		
**Northwestern**	64–62	No. 10 Michigan State	January 15, 2022		
Marquette	73–72	No. 20 Seton Hall	January 15, 2022		
**Arkansas**	65–58	No. 12 LSU	January 15, 2022		
**Oklahoma State**	61–54	No. 1 Baylor	January 15, 2022		
Mississippi State	78–76	No. 24 Alabama	January 15, 2022		
**Oregon**	79–69	No. 5 USC	January 15, 2022		
**Kansas State**	66–65	No. 23 Texas	January 18, 2022		
Florida State	79–78^{OT}	No. 6 Duke	January 18, 2022		
Alabama	70–67	No. 13 LSU	January 19, 2022		
**Marquette**	57–54	No. 11 Villanova	January 19, 2022		
Indiana	68–65	No. 4 Purdue	January 20, 2022	Rivalry/Indiana National Guard Governor's Cup	
Maryland	81–65	No. 17 Illinois	January 21, 2022		
**Missouri State**	79–69	No. 22 Loyola–Chicago	January 22, 2022		
**TCU**	59–44	No. 15 Iowa State	January 22, 2022		
Marquette	75–64	No. 20 Xavier	January 23, 2022		
**VCU**	70–68	No. 25 Davidson	January 26, 2022		
**Stanford**	64–61	No. 15 USC	January 27, 2022		
TCU	77–68	No. 19 LSU	January 29, 2022	Big 12/SEC Challenge	
Alabama	87–78	No. 4 Baylor	January 29, 2022	Big 12/SEC Challenge	
Texas	52–51	No. 18 Tennessee	January 29, 2022	Big 12/SEC Challenge	
**Creighton**	59–55	No. 17 UConn	February 1, 2022		
**Ole Miss**	76–72	No. 25 LSU	February 1, 2022		
**DePaul**	69–65	No. 21 Xavier	February 5, 2022		
Rutgers	84–63	No. 13 Michigan State	February 5, 2022		
Vanderbilt	75–66	No. 25 LSU	February 5, 2022		
Arizona State	87–84^{3OT}	No. 3 UCLA	February 5, 2022		
**Virginia**	69–68	No. 7 Duke	February 7, 2022		
Arkansas	80–76^{OT}	No. 1 Auburn	February 8, 2022		
Santa Clara	77–72	No. 22 Saint Mary's	February 8, 2022		
Rutgers	66–64	No. 16 Ohio State	February 9, 2022		
SMU	85–83	No. 6 Houston	February 9, 2022	Rivalry	
Seton Hall	73–71	No. 25 Xavier	February 9, 2022		
Oklahoma	70–55	No. 9 Texas Tech	February 9, 2022		
Michigan	82–58	No. 3 Purdue	February 10, 2022		
**Rutgers**	73–65	No. 14 Wisconsin	February 12, 2022		
**Memphis**	69–59	No. 6 Houston	February 12, 2022		
Butler	85–79	No. 18 Marquette	February 12, 2022		
Penn State	62–58	No. 19 Michigan State	February 15, 2022		
New Mexico	75–66	No. 22 Wyoming	February 15, 2022		
Rutgers	70–59	No. 12 Illinois	February 16, 2022		First unranked D-I men's team to defeat ranked teams in four consecutive regular-season games
Florida	63–62	No. 2 Auburn	February 19, 2022		
**Iowa**	75–62	No. 18 Ohio State	February 19, 2022		
Oregon	68–63	No. 12 UCLA	February 24, 2022		
Michigan State	68–65	No. 4 Purdue	February 26, 2022		
TCU	69–66	No. 9 Texas Tech	February 26, 2022		
Colorado	79–63	No. 2 Arizona	February 26, 2022		
No. 23 Saint Mary's	67–57	No. 1 Gonzaga	February 26, 2022	Rivalry	
Maryland	75–60	No. 22 Ohio State	February 27, 2022		
**Nebraska**	78–70	No. 23 Ohio State	March 1, 2022		
TCU	74–64	No. 6 Kansas	March 1, 2022		
**Texas A&M**	87–71	No. 25 Alabama	March 2, 2022		
Creighton	64–62	No. 18 UConn	March 2, 2022		
LSU	80–77^{OT}	No. 25 Alabama	March 5, 2022		
Oklahoma State	52–51	No. 12 Texas Tech	March 5, 2022		
**North Carolina**	94–81	No. 4 Duke	March 5, 2022	Rivalry	Mike Krzyzewski's last regular-season game as coach
Memphis	75–61	No. 14 Houston	March 6, 2022		
**Michigan**	75–69	No. 23 Ohio State	March 6, 2022	Rivalry	
**Nebraska**	74–73	No. 10 Wisconsin	March 6, 2022		
TCU	65–60	No. 22 Texas	March 10, 2022	Big 12 tournament	
Oklahoma	72–67	No. 3 Baylor	March 10, 2022	Big 12 Tournament	
Indiana	65–63	No. 16 Illinois	March 11, 2022	Big Ten tournament	
Texas A&M	67–62	No. 4 Auburn	March 11, 2022	SEC tournament	
Creighton	85–58	No. 11 Providence	March 11, 2022	Big East tournament	
Michigan State	69–63	No. 12 Wisconsin	March 11, 2022	Big Ten tournament	
Virginia Tech	72–59	No. 25 North Carolina	March 11, 2022	ACC tournament	
San Diego State	63–58	No. 23 Colorado State	March 11, 2022	Mountain West tournament	
Texas A&M	82–64	No. 15 Arkansas	March 12, 2022	SEC Tournament	
Virginia Tech	82–67	No. 7 Duke	March 12, 2022	ACC Tournament	Mike Krzyzewski's last conference tournament game as coach

In addition to the above listed upsets in which an unranked team defeated a ranked team, there were eight non-Division I teams to defeat a Division I team this season. Bold type indicates winning teams in "true road games"—i.e., those played on an opponent's home court (including secondary homes).

Winner	Score	Loser	Date	Tournament/event
**Salisbury** (Division III)	91–78	Delaware State	November 12, 2021	
**Ottawa (AZ)** (NAIA)	72–71	Denver	November 12, 2021	
Hawaii–Hilo (Division II)	87–79^{OT}	Northern Colorado	November 13, 2021	Outrigger Hotels Rainbow Classic
**Texas A&M–Commerce** (Division II)	65–62	UTSA	November 15, 2021	210 San Antonio Shootout
**Concordia Texas** (Division III)	80–76	Incarnate Word	November 16, 2021	
**Saginaw Valley State** (Division II)	80–63	Western Michigan	November 18, 2021	
**Academy of Art** (Division II)	79–60	UC Davis	November 28, 2021	
**Bethesda** (NCCAA)	82–80	Cal State Northridge	December 22, 2021	

=== Conference winners and tournaments ===
Each of the 32 Division I athletic conferences ended its regular season with a single-elimination tournament. The team with the best regular-season record in each conference received the number one seed in each tournament, with tiebreakers used as needed in the case of ties for the top seeding. Unless otherwise noted, the winners of these tournaments received automatic invitations to the 2022 NCAA Division I men's basketball tournament.

Conference	Regular season first place	Conference player of the year	Conference coach of the Year	Conference tournament	Tournament venue (city)	Tournament winner
America East Conference	Vermont	Ryan Davis, Vermont	John Becker, Vermont	2022 America East men's basketball tournament	Campus sites	Vermont
American Athletic Conference	Houston	Kendric Davis, SMU	Kelvin Sampson, Houston	2022 American Athletic Conference men's basketball tournament	Dickies Arena (Fort Worth, TX)	Houston
ASUN Conference	Liberty (East); Jacksonville State (West) (Note: These conferences chose to seed their tournament by division, with both divisional champions being top seeds in different halves of the bracket.)	Darius McGhee, Liberty	Ray Harper, Jacksonville State	2022 ASUN men's basketball tournament	Campus sites	Bellarmine (Note: Jacksonville State, which had the best record in regular-season conference play, received the ASUN automatic bid because Bellarmine is ineligible for NCAA-sponsored postseason play during its transition from Division II.)
Atlantic 10 Conference	Davidson	Luka Brajkovic, Davidson	Bob McKillop, Davidson	2022 Atlantic 10 men's basketball tournament	Capital One Arena (Washington, D.C.)	Richmond
Atlantic Coast Conference	Duke	Alondes Williams, Wake Forest	Steve Forbes, Wake Forest	2022 ACC men's basketball tournament	Barclays Center (Brooklyn, NY)	Virginia Tech
Big 12 Conference	Kansas, (Note: Top seed in conference tournament.); Baylor	Ochai Agbaji, Kansas	Scott Drew, Baylor	2022 Big 12 men's basketball tournament	T-Mobile Center (Kansas City, MO)	Kansas
Big East Conference	Providence	Collin Gillespie, Villanova	Ed Cooley, Providence	2022 Big East men's basketball tournament	Madison Square Garden (New York, NY)	Villanova
Big Sky Conference	Montana State	Jubrile Belo, Montana State	Danny Sprinkle, Montana State	2022 Big Sky Conference men's basketball tournament	Idaho Central Arena (Boise, ID)	Montana State
Big South Conference	Longwood (North); Winthrop (South)	D. J. Burns, Winthrop	Griff Aldrich, Longwood	2022 Big South Conference men's basketball tournament	Bojangles Coliseum (Charlotte, NC)	Longwood
Big Ten Conference	Illinois, Wisconsin	Johnny Davis, Wisconsin	Greg Gard, Wisconsin	2022 Big Ten men's basketball tournament	Gainbridge Fieldhouse (Indianapolis, IN)	Iowa
Big West Conference	Long Beach State	Colin Slater, Long Beach State	Dan Monson, Long Beach State	2022 Big West Conference men's basketball tournament	Dollar Loan Center (Henderson, NV)	Cal State Fullerton
Colonial Athletic Association	Towson, UNC Wilmington	Aaron Estrada, Hofstra	Takayo Siddle, UNC Wilmington	2022 CAA men's basketball tournament	Entertainment and Sports Arena (Washington, D.C.)	Delaware
Conference USA	Middle Tennessee (East); North Texas (West)	Jordan Walker, UAB	Nick McDevitt, Middle Tennessee	2022 Conference USA men's basketball tournament	Ford Center at The Star (Frisco, TX)	UAB
Horizon League	Cleveland State, Purdue Fort Wayne	Jamal Cain, Oakland & Antoine Davis, Detroit Mercy	Jon Coffman, Purdue Fort Wayne	2022 Horizon League men's basketball tournament	Quarterfinals: Campus sites Semifinals and final: Indiana Farmers Coliseum (Indianapolis, IN)	Wright State
Ivy League	Princeton	Tosan Evbuomwan, Princeton	Brian Earl, Cornell	2022 Ivy League men's basketball tournament	Lavietes Pavilion (Boston, MA)	Yale
Metro Atlantic Athletic Conference	Iona	Tyson Jolly, Iona	Rick Pitino, Iona	2022 MAAC men's basketball tournament	Boardwalk Hall (Atlantic City, NJ)	Saint Peter's
Mid-American Conference	Toledo	Sincere Carry, Kent State	Rob Senderoff, Kent State	2022 Mid-American Conference men's basketball tournament	Rocket Mortgage FieldHouse (Cleveland, OH)	Akron
Mid-Eastern Athletic Conference	Norfolk State	Joe Bryant Jr., Norfolk State	Robert Jones, Norfolk State	2022 MEAC men's basketball tournament	Norfolk Scope (Norfolk, VA)	Norfolk State
Missouri Valley Conference	Northern Iowa	A. J. Green, Northern Iowa	Ben Jacobson, Northern Iowa	2022 Missouri Valley Conference men's basketball tournament	Enterprise Center (St. Louis, MO)	Loyola Chicago
Mountain West Conference	Boise State	David Roddy, Colorado State	Leon Rice, Boise State	2022 Mountain West Conference men's basketball tournament	Thomas & Mack Center (Paradise, NV)	Boise State
Northeast Conference	Bryant	Alex Morales, Wagner	Jared Grasso, Bryant	2022 Northeast Conference men's basketball tournament	Campus sites	Bryant
Ohio Valley Conference	Murray State	KJ Williams, Murray State	Matt McMahon, Murray State	2022 Ohio Valley Conference men's basketball tournament	Ford Center (Evansville, IN)	Murray State
Pac-12 Conference	Arizona	Bennedict Mathurin, Arizona	Tommy Lloyd, Arizona	2022 Pac-12 Conference men's basketball tournament	T-Mobile Arena (Paradise, NV)	Arizona
Patriot League	Colgate	Sukhmail Mathon, Boston University	Ed DeChellis, Navy	2022 Patriot League men's basketball tournament	Campus sites	Colgate
Southeastern Conference	Auburn	Oscar Tshiebwe, Kentucky	Bruce Pearl, Auburn	2022 SEC men's basketball tournament	Amalie Arena (Tampa, FL)	Tennessee
Southern Conference	Chattanooga	Malachi Smith, Chattanooga	Lamont Paris, Chattanooga (Coaches) & Bucky McMillan, Samford (Media)	2022 Southern Conference men's basketball tournament	Harrah's Cherokee Center (Asheville, NC)	Chattanooga
Southland Conference	Nicholls	Ty Gordon, Nicholls	David Kiefer, Southeastern Louisiana	2022 Southland Conference men's basketball tournament	Leonard E. Merrell Center (Katy, TX)	Texas A&M–Corpus Christi
Southwestern Athletic Conference	Alcorn State	M. J. Randolph, Florida A&M	Landon Bussie, Alcorn State	2022 SWAC men's basketball tournament	Bartow Arena (Birmingham, AL)	Texas Southern
Summit League	South Dakota State	Baylor Scheierman, South Dakota State	Eric Henderson, South Dakota State	2022 Summit League men's basketball tournament	Denny Sanford Premier Center (Sioux Falls, SD)	South Dakota State
Sun Belt Conference	Texas State	Norchad Omier, Arkansas State	Terrence Johnson, Texas State	2022 Sun Belt Conference men's basketball tournament	Pensacola Bay Center (Pensacola, FL)	Georgia State
West Coast Conference	Gonzaga	Drew Timme, Gonzaga	Randy Bennett, Saint Mary's	2022 West Coast Conference men's basketball tournament	Orleans Arena (Paradise, NV)	Gonzaga
Western Athletic Conference	New Mexico State, Seattle, Stephen F. Austin	Teddy Allen, New Mexico State	Chris Victor, Seattle	2022 WAC men's basketball tournament	Orleans Arena (Paradise, NV)	New Mexico State

=== Statistical leaders ===
Source for additional stats categories

**Points per game**			**Rebounds per game**			**Assists per game**			**Steals per game**		
Player	School	PPG	Player	School	RPG	Player	School	APG	Player	School	SPG
Peter Kiss	Bryant	25.2	Oscar Tshiebwe	Kentucky	15.1	Yuri Collins	Saint Louis	7.9	Nendah Tarke	Coppin St.	2.94
Darius McGhee	Liberty	24.6	Fardaws Aimaq	Utah Valley	13.6	Jalen Moore	Oakland	7.7	Jacob Gilyard	Richmond	2.92
Antoine Davis	Detroit Mercy	23.9	Armando Bacot	North Carolina	13.1	Sahvir Wheeler	Kentucky	6.9	Ace Baldwin Jr.	VCU	2.54
Keegan Murray	Iowa	23.5	Norchad Omier	Arkansas St.	12.2	Grant Sherfield	Nevada	6.4	DeWayne Cox	Prairie View A&M	2.52
Max Abmas	Oral Roberts	22.8	Chuba Ohams	Fordham	11.6	Hunter Maldonado	Wyoming	6.3	Darrion Trammell	Seattle	2.52

**Blocked shots per game**			**Field goal percentage**			**Three-point field goal percentage**			**Free throw percentage**		
Player	School	BPG	Player	School	FG%	Player	School	3FG%	Player	School	FT%
Jamarion Sharp	Western Kentucky	4.62	Enrique Freeman	Akron	66.54	Kyle Foster	Howard	45.85	Foster Loyer	Davidson	93.65
Walker Kessler	Auburn	4.56	DaRon Holmes II	Dayton	64.89	Demaree King	Jacksonville State	45.16	Mason Archambault	South Dakota	93.01
Johni Broome	Morehead State	3.85	Zach Edey	Purdue	64.81	Joe French	Bethune–Cookman	44.12	Shawn Williams	Arkansas–Pine Bluff	92.68
Chet Holmgren	Gonzaga	3.66	Ryan Kalkbrenner	Creighton	64.55	Foster Loyer	Davidson	43.79	Joe Quintana	Loyola Marymount	92.50
Ike Obiagu	Seton Hall	3.21	Kevin Samuel	Florida Gulf Coast	64.36	Nijel Pack	Kansas State	43.58	RJ Glasper	Incarnate Word	91.76

=== Conference standings ===
2021–22 America East Conference men's basketball standings
	Conf.				Overall
Team	W		L	PCT	W		L	PCT
Vermont †	17	–	1	.944	28	–	6	.824
UMBC	11	–	7	.611	18	–	14	.563
Stony Brook*	10	–	8	.556	18	–	13	.581
New Hampshire	10	–	8	.556	15	–	13	.536
Hartford	9	–	9	.500	12	–	20	.375
Albany	9	–	9	.500	13	–	18	.419
Binghamton	8	–	10	.444	12	–	17	.414
UMass Lowell	7	–	11	.389	15	–	16	.484
NJIT	6	–	12	.333	11	–	18	.379
Maine	3	–	15	.167	6	–	23	.207
† 2022 AmEast tournament winner *Ineligible for the 2022 AmEast tournament due to changing conferences in 2022

2021–22 American Athletic Conference men's basketball standings
	Conf.				Overall
Team	W		L	PCT	W		L	PCT
No. 15 Houston †	15	–	3	.833	32	–	6	.842
SMU	13	–	4	.765	24	–	9	.727
Memphis	13	–	5	.722	22	–	11	.667
Temple	10	–	7	.588	17	–	12	.586
Tulane	10	–	8	.556	14	–	15	.483
UCF	9	–	9	.500	18	–	12	.600
Wichita State	6	–	9	.400	15	–	13	.536
Cincinnati	7	–	11	.389	18	–	15	.545
East Carolina	6	–	11	.353	15	–	15	.500
Tulsa	4	–	14	.222	11	–	20	.355
South Florida	3	–	15	.167	8	–	23	.258
† 2022 AAC tournament winner Rankings from AP poll

2021–22 Atlantic 10 men's basketball standings
	Conf.				Overall
Team	W		L	PCT	W		L	PCT
Davidson	15	–	3	.833	27	–	7	.794
Dayton	14	–	4	.778	24	–	11	.686
VCU	14	–	4	.778	22	–	10	.688
St. Bonaventure	12	–	5	.706	23	–	10	.697
Saint Louis	12	–	6	.667	23	–	12	.657
Richmond †	10	–	8	.556	24	–	13	.649
George Washington	8	–	9	.471	12	–	18	.400
Fordham	8	–	10	.444	16	–	16	.500
George Mason	7	–	9	.438	14	–	16	.467
UMass	7	–	11	.389	15	–	17	.469
Rhode Island	5	–	12	.294	15	–	16	.484
La Salle	5	–	13	.278	11	–	19	.367
Saint Joseph's	5	–	13	.278	11	–	19	.367
Duquesne	1	–	16	.059	6	–	24	.200
† 2022 A-10 tournament winner

2021–22 ACC men's basketball standings
	Conf.				Overall
Team	W		L	PCT	W		L	PCT
No. 9 Duke	16	–	4	.800	32	–	7	.821
North Carolina	15	–	5	.750	29	–	10	.744
Notre Dame	15	–	5	.750	24	–	11	.686
Miami (FL)	14	–	6	.700	26	–	11	.703
Wake Forest	13	–	7	.650	25	–	10	.714
Virginia	12	–	8	.600	21	–	14	.600
Virginia Tech †	11	–	9	.550	23	–	13	.639
Florida State	10	–	10	.500	17	–	14	.548
Syracuse	9	–	11	.450	16	–	17	.485
Clemson	8	–	12	.400	17	–	16	.515
Louisville	6	–	14	.300	13	–	19	.406
Boston College	6	–	14	.300	13	–	20	.394
Pittsburgh	6	–	14	.300	11	–	21	.344
Georgia Tech	5	–	15	.250	12	–	20	.375
NC State	4	–	16	.200	11	–	21	.344
† 2022 ACC tournament winner Rankings from AP poll

2021–22 ASUN men's basketball standings
	Conf.				Overall
Team	W		L	PCT	W		L	PCT
East
Liberty	12	–	4	.750	22	–	11	.667
Jacksonville	11	–	5	.688	21	–	10	.677
Florida Gulf Coast	10	–	6	.625	22	–	12	.647
Kennesaw State	7	–	9	.438	13	–	18	.419
North Florida	7	–	9	.438	11	–	20	.355
Stetson	5	–	11	.313	11	–	19	.367
West
Jacksonville State^	13	–	3	.813	21	–	11	.656
Bellarmine* †	11	–	5	.688	20	–	13	.606
Central Arkansas	7	–	9	.438	11	–	20	.355
Lipscomb	6	–	10	.375	14	–	19	.424
Eastern Kentucky	5	–	11	.313	13	–	18	.419
North Alabama*	2	–	14	.125	9	–	21	.300
† 2022 ASUN tournament winner *Ineligible for the 2022 NCAA tournament due to transition from Division II^Due to Bellarmine's ineligibility, the regular-season champions Jacksonville State took their NCAA tournament berth instead.

2021–22 Big 12 men's basketball standings
	Conf.				Overall
Team	W		L	PCT	W		L	PCT
No. 3 Kansas †	14	–	4	.778	34	–	6	.850
No. 4 Baylor	14	–	4	.778	27	–	7	.794
No. 12 Texas Tech	12	–	6	.667	27	–	10	.730
No. 25 Texas	10	–	8	.556	22	–	12	.647
TCU	8	–	10	.444	21	–	13	.618
Oklahoma State*	8	–	10	.444	15	–	15	.500
Iowa State	7	–	11	.389	22	–	13	.629
Oklahoma	7	–	11	.389	19	–	16	.543
Kansas State	6	–	12	.333	14	–	17	.452
West Virginia	4	–	14	.222	16	–	17	.485
† 2022 Big 12 Tournament winner *Oklahoma State was ineligible for both the 2022 Big 12 Tournament and the 2022 NCAA tournament due to postseason ban imposed by the NCAA. Rankings from AP poll

2021–22 Big East men's basketball standings
	Conf.				Overall
Team	W		L	PCT	W		L	PCT
No. 13 Providence	14	–	3	.824	27	–	6	.818
No. 6 Villanova †	16	–	4	.800	30	–	8	.789
No. 21 UConn	13	–	6	.684	23	–	10	.697
Creighton	12	–	7	.632	23	–	12	.657
Seton Hall	11	–	8	.579	21	–	11	.656
Marquette	11	–	8	.579	19	–	13	.594
Xavier	8	–	11	.421	23	–	13	.639
St. John's	8	–	11	.421	17	–	15	.531
Butler	6	–	14	.300	14	–	19	.424
DePaul	6	–	14	.300	15	–	16	.484
Georgetown	0	–	19	.000	6	–	25	.194
† 2022 Big East tournament winner Rankings from AP poll

2021–22 Big Sky men's basketball standings
	Conf.				Overall
Team	W		L	PCT	W		L	PCT
Montana State †	16	–	4	.800	27	–	8	.771
Southern Utah	14	–	6	.700	23	–	12	.657
Northern Colorado	13	–	7	.650	22	–	16	.579
Weber State	13	–	7	.650	21	–	12	.636
Montana	11	–	9	.550	18	–	14	.563
Eastern Washington	11	–	9	.550	18	–	16	.529
Portland State	10	–	10	.500	14	–	17	.452
Sacramento State	6	–	14	.300	11	–	18	.379
Idaho	6	–	14	.300	9	–	22	.290
Idaho State	5	–	15	.250	7	–	23	.233
Northern Arizona	5	–	15	.250	9	–	23	.281
† Conference tournament winner

2021–22 Big South men's basketball standings
	Conf.				Overall
Team	W		L	PCT	W		L	PCT
North
Longwood †	15	–	1	.938	26	–	7	.788
Campbell	8	–	8	.500	16	–	13	.552
High Point	7	–	9	.438	14	–	18	.438
Radford	7	–	9	.438	11	–	18	.379
North Carolina A&T	6	–	10	.375	12	–	20	.375
Hampton	5	–	11	.313	9	–	19	.321
South
Winthrop	14	–	2	.875	23	–	9	.719
Gardner–Webb	11	–	5	.688	18	–	13	.581
USC Upstate	10	–	6	.625	15	–	17	.469
UNC Asheville	8	–	8	.500	17	–	15	.531
Presbyterian	4	–	12	.250	12	–	20	.375
Charleston Southern	1	–	15	.063	6	–	25	.194
† 2022 Big South tournament winner

2021–22 Big Ten Conference men's basketball standings
	Conf.				Overall
Team	W		L	PCT	W		L	PCT
No. 19 Illinois	15	–	5	.750	23	–	10	.697
No. 14 Wisconsin	15	–	5	.750	25	–	8	.758
No. 10 Purdue	14	–	6	.700	29	–	8	.784
Rutgers	12	–	8	.600	18	–	14	.563
No. 16 Iowa †	12	–	8	.600	26	–	10	.722
Ohio State	12	–	8	.600	20	–	12	.625
Michigan State	11	–	9	.550	23	–	13	.639
Michigan	11	–	9	.550	19	–	15	.559
Indiana	9	–	11	.450	21	–	14	.600
Maryland	7	–	13	.350	15	–	17	.469
Penn State	7	–	13	.350	14	–	17	.452
Northwestern	7	–	13	.350	15	–	16	.484
Nebraska	4	–	16	.200	10	–	22	.313
Minnesota	4	–	16	.200	13	–	17	.433
† Conference tournament winner Rankings from AP poll

2021–22 Big West men's basketball standings
	Conf.				Overall
Team	W		L	PCT	W		L	PCT
Long Beach State	12	–	3	.800	20	–	13	.606
Cal State Fullerton †	11	–	4	.733	21	–	11	.656
Hawai'i	10	–	5	.667	17	–	11	.607
UC Irvine	9	–	5	.643	15	–	10	.600
UC Santa Barbara	8	–	5	.615	17	–	11	.607
UC Riverside	9	–	6	.600	16	–	12	.571
UC Davis	5	–	6	.455	13	–	11	.542
UC San Diego*	7	–	11	.389	13	–	16	.448
Cal State Northridge	3	–	13	.188	7	–	23	.233
Cal State Bakersfield	2	–	12	.143	8	–	19	.296
Cal Poly	2	–	12	.143	7	–	21	.250
† 2022 Big West tournament winner * ineligible for the 2022 NCAA tournament and 2022 Big West tournament due to transition period; Big West games not counted in standings

2021–22 Conference USA men's basketball standings
	Conf.				Overall
Team	W		L	PCT	W		L	PCT
East
Middle Tennessee	13	–	5	.722	26	–	11	.703
Western Kentucky	11	–	7	.611	19	–	13	.594
Florida Atlantic	11	–	7	.611	19	–	15	.559
Charlotte	10	–	8	.556	17	–	14	.548
Old Dominion	8	–	10	.444	13	–	19	.406
FIU	5	–	13	.278	15	–	17	.469
Marshall	4	–	14	.222	12	–	21	.364
West
North Texas	16	–	2	.889	25	–	7	.781
UAB †	14	–	4	.778	27	–	8	.771
Louisiana Tech	12	–	6	.667	24	–	10	.706
UTEP	11	–	7	.611	20	–	14	.588
Rice	7	–	11	.389	16	–	17	.485
UTSA	3	–	15	.167	10	–	22	.313
Southern Miss	1	–	17	.056	7	–	26	.212
† 2022 C-USA Tournament winner

2021–22 CAA men's basketball standings
	Conf.				Overall
Team	W		L	PCT	W		L	PCT
Towson	15	–	3	.833	25	–	9	.735
UNC Wilmington	15	–	3	.833	27	–	9	.750
Hofstra	13	–	5	.722	21	–	11	.656
Drexel	10	–	8	.556	15	–	14	.517
Delaware †	10	–	8	.556	22	–	13	.629
Charleston	8	–	10	.444	17	–	15	.531
Elon	7	–	11	.389	10	–	22	.313
James Madison*	6	–	12	.333	15	–	14	.517
William & Mary	4	–	14	.222	5	–	27	.156
Northeastern	2	–	16	.111	9	–	22	.290
† 2022 CAA tournament winner *Ineligible for conference tournament due to changing conferences in 2022

2021–22 Horizon League men's basketball standings
	Conf.				Overall
Team	W		L	PCT	W		L	PCT
Cleveland State	15	–	6	.714	20	–	11	.645
Purdue Fort Wayne	15	–	6	.714	21	–	12	.636
Northern Kentucky	14	–	6	.700	20	–	12	.625
Wright State †	15	–	7	.682	22	–	14	.611
Oakland	12	–	7	.632	20	–	12	.625
Detroit Mercy	10	–	7	.588	14	–	15	.483
Youngstown State	12	–	9	.571	19	–	15	.559
UIC	9	–	10	.474	14	–	16	.467
Milwaukee	8	–	14	.364	10	–	22	.313
Robert Morris	5	–	16	.238	8	–	23	.258
Green Bay	4	–	16	.200	5	–	25	.167
IUPUI	1	–	16	.059	3	–	26	.103
† 2022 Horizon League tournament winner

2021–22 Ivy League men's basketball standings
	Conf.				Overall
Team	W		L	PCT	W		L	PCT
Princeton	12	–	2	.857	23	–	7	.767
Yale †	11	–	3	.786	19	–	12	.613
Penn	9	–	5	.643	12	–	16	.429
Cornell	7	–	7	.500	15	–	11	.577
Dartmouth	6	–	8	.429	9	–	16	.360
Harvard	5	–	9	.357	13	–	13	.500
Brown	5	–	9	.357	13	–	16	.448
Columbia	1	–	13	.071	4	–	22	.154
† 2022 Ivy League Tournament winner

2021–22 MAAC men's basketball standings
	Conf.				Overall
Team	W		L	PCT	W		L	PCT
Iona	17	–	3	.850	25	–	8	.758
Saint Peter's †	14	–	6	.700	22	–	12	.647
Siena	12	–	8	.600	15	–	14	.517
Monmouth	11	–	9	.550	21	–	13	.618
Niagara	9	–	11	.450	14	–	16	.467
Marist	9	–	11	.450	14	–	16	.467
Fairfield	8	–	12	.400	15	–	18	.455
Manhattan	8	–	12	.400	15	–	15	.500
Rider	8	–	12	.400	14	–	19	.424
Canisius	7	–	13	.350	11	–	21	.344
Quinnipiac	7	–	13	.350	14	–	17	.452
† 2022 MAAC tournament winner

2021–22 Mid-American Conference men's basketball standings
	Conf.				Overall
Team	W		L	PCT	W		L	PCT
Toledo	17	–	3	.850	26	–	8	.765
Kent State	16	–	4	.800	23	–	11	.676
Ohio	14	–	6	.700	25	–	10	.714
Akron †	14	–	6	.700	24	–	10	.706
Buffalo	13	–	6	.684	19	–	11	.633
Ball State	9	–	10	.474	14	–	17	.452
Miami (OH)	8	–	12	.400	14	–	18	.438
Central Michigan	6	–	12	.333	7	–	23	.233
Bowling Green	6	–	14	.300	13	–	18	.419
Northern Illinois	6	–	14	.300	9	–	21	.300
Eastern Michigan	5	–	15	.250	10	–	21	.323
Western Michigan	4	–	16	.200	8	–	23	.258
† 2022 MAC tournament winner

2021–22 MEAC men's basketball standings
	Conf.				Overall
Team	W		L	PCT	W		L	PCT
Norfolk State †	12	–	2	.857	24	–	7	.774
Howard	9	–	5	.643	16	–	13	.552
North Carolina Central	8	–	5	.615	16	–	15	.516
Morgan State	7	–	6	.538	13	–	15	.464
South Carolina State	7	–	7	.500	15	–	16	.484
Maryland Eastern Shore	6	–	8	.429	11	–	16	.407
Coppin State	6	–	8	.429	9	–	23	.281
Delaware State	0	–	14	.000	2	–	26	.071
† 2022 MEAC tournament winner

2021–22 Missouri Valley Conference men's basketball standings
	Conf.				Overall
Team	W		L	PCT	W		L	PCT
Northern Iowa	14	–	4	.778	20	–	12	.625
Missouri State	13	–	5	.722	23	–	11	.676
Drake	13	–	5	.722	25	–	11	.694
Loyola Chicago †	13	–	5	.722	25	–	8	.758
Bradley	11	–	7	.611	17	–	14	.548
Southern Illinois	9	–	9	.500	16	–	14	.533
Valparaiso	6	–	12	.333	14	–	18	.438
Illinois State	5	–	13	.278	13	–	20	.394
Indiana State	4	–	14	.222	11	–	20	.355
Evansville	2	–	16	.111	6	–	24	.200
† 2022 MVC tournament winner

2021–22 Mountain West Conference men's basketball standings
	Conf.				Overall
Team	W		L	PCT	W		L	PCT
No. 23 Boise State †	15	–	3	.833	27	–	8	.771
No. 24 Colorado State	14	–	4	.778	25	–	6	.806
San Diego State	13	–	4	.765	23	–	9	.719
Wyoming	13	–	5	.722	25	–	9	.735
UNLV	10	–	8	.556	18	–	14	.563
Fresno State	8	–	9	.471	23	–	13	.639
Utah State	8	–	10	.444	18	–	16	.529
Nevada	6	–	12	.333	13	–	18	.419
New Mexico	5	–	12	.294	13	–	19	.406
Air Force	4	–	13	.235	11	–	18	.379
San Jose State	1	–	17	.056	8	–	23	.258
† Conference tournament winner Rankings from AP poll

2021–22 Northeast Conference men's basketball standings
	Conf.				Overall
Team	W		L	PCT	W		L	PCT
Bryant †	16	–	2	.889	22	–	10	.688
Wagner	15	–	3	.833	21	–	6	.778
LIU	12	–	6	.667	16	–	14	.533
Merrimack*	10	–	8	.556	14	–	16	.467
Mount St. Mary's	9	–	9	.500	14	–	16	.467
St. Francis Brooklyn	7	–	11	.389	10	–	20	.333
Sacred Heart	6	–	12	.333	10	–	20	.333
Saint Francis (PA)	5	–	13	.278	9	–	21	.300
Central Connecticut	5	–	13	.278	8	–	24	.250
Fairleigh Dickinson	5	–	13	.278	4	–	22	.154
† 2022 NEC tournament winner * ineligible for the 2022 NCAA tournament due to transition period

2021–22 Ohio Valley Conference men's basketball standings
	Conf.				Overall
Team	W		L	PCT	W		L	PCT
No. 20 Murray State †	18	–	0	1.000	31	–	3	.912
Belmont	15	–	3	.833	25	–	8	.758
Morehead State	13	–	5	.722	23	–	11	.676
Southeast Missouri State	8	–	9	.471	14	–	18	.438
Tennessee State	8	–	10	.444	14	–	18	.438
Austin Peay	8	–	10	.444	12	–	17	.414
Tennessee Tech	7	–	10	.412	11	–	21	.344
SIU Edwardsville	5	–	13	.278	11	–	21	.344
UT Martin	4	–	14	.222	8	–	22	.267
Eastern Illinois	3	–	15	.167	5	–	26	.161
† 2022 OVC tournament winner Rankings from AP poll

2021–22 Pac-12 Conference men's basketball standings
	Conf.				Overall
Team	W		L	PCT	W		L	PCT
No. 2 Arizona †	18	–	2	.900	33	–	4	.892
No. 11 UCLA	15	–	5	.750	27	–	8	.771
No. 22 USC	14	–	6	.700	26	–	8	.765
Colorado	12	–	8	.600	21	–	12	.636
Oregon	11	–	9	.550	20	–	15	.571
Washington	11	–	9	.550	17	–	15	.531
Washington State	11	–	9	.550	22	–	15	.595
Arizona State	10	–	10	.500	14	–	17	.452
Stanford	8	–	12	.400	16	–	16	.500
California	5	–	15	.250	12	–	20	.375
Utah	4	–	16	.200	11	–	20	.355
Oregon State	1	–	19	.050	3	–	28	.097
† Conference tournament winner Rankings from AP poll

2021–22 Patriot League men's basketball standings
	Conf.				Overall
Team	W		L	PCT	W		L	PCT
Colgate †	16	–	2	.889	23	–	12	.657
Navy	12	–	6	.667	21	–	11	.656
Boston University	11	–	7	.611	22	–	13	.629
Lehigh	10	–	8	.556	13	–	19	.406
Army	9	–	9	.500	15	–	16	.484
Loyola	8	–	10	.444	14	–	16	.467
Holy Cross	7	–	11	.389	9	–	22	.290
Lafayette	7	–	11	.389	10	–	20	.333
Bucknell	5	–	13	.278	9	–	23	.281
American	5	–	13	.278	10	–	22	.313
† 2022 Patriot League tournament winner

2021–22 Southeastern Conference men's basketball standings
	Conf.				Overall
Team	W		L	PCT	W		L	PCT
No. 14 Auburn	15	–	3	.833	28	–	6	.824
No. 16 Kentucky	14	–	4	.778	26	–	8	.765
No. 15 Tennessee †	14	–	4	.778	27	–	8	.771
No. 8 Arkansas	13	–	5	.722	28	–	9	.757
LSU	9	–	9	.500	22	–	12	.647
Alabama	9	–	9	.500	19	–	14	.576
South Carolina	9	–	9	.500	18	–	13	.581
Texas A&M	9	–	9	.500	27	–	13	.675
Florida	9	–	9	.500	20	–	14	.588
Mississippi State	8	–	10	.444	18	–	16	.529
Vanderbilt	7	–	11	.389	19	–	17	.528
Missouri	5	–	13	.278	12	–	21	.364
Ole Miss	4	–	14	.222	13	–	19	.406
Georgia	1	–	17	.056	6	–	26	.188
† 2022 SEC tournament winner Rankings from AP poll

2021–22 SWAC men's basketball standings
	Conf.				Overall
Team	W		L	PCT	W		L	PCT
Alcorn State	14	–	4	.778	17	–	17	.500
Texas Southern †	13	–	5	.722	19	–	13	.594
Southern	12	–	6	.667	17	–	14	.548
Florida A&M	11	–	7	.611	13	–	17	.433
Alabama A&M	10	–	8	.556	12	–	18	.400
Grambling State	9	–	9	.500	12	–	20	.375
Jackson State	9	–	9	.500	11	–	19	.367
Prairie View A&M	8	–	10	.444	8	–	19	.296
Alabama State	8	–	10	.444	9	–	21	.300
Bethune–Cookman	7	–	11	.389	9	–	21	.300
Arkansas–Pine Bluff	5	–	13	.278	7	–	24	.226
Mississippi Valley State	2	–	16	.111	2	–	26	.071
† 2022 SWAC tournament winner

2021–22 Southern Conference men's basketball standings
	Conf.				Overall
Team	W		L	PCT	W		L	PCT
Chattanooga †	14	–	4	.778	27	–	8	.771
Furman	12	–	6	.667	22	–	12	.647
Samford	10	–	8	.556	21	–	11	.656
Wofford	10	–	8	.556	19	–	13	.594
VMI	9	–	9	.500	16	–	16	.500
UNC Greensboro	9	–	9	.500	17	–	15	.531
Mercer	8	–	10	.444	16	–	17	.485
East Tennessee State	7	–	11	.389	15	–	17	.469
The Citadel	6	–	12	.333	13	–	17	.433
Western Carolina	5	–	13	.278	11	–	21	.344
† 2022 SoCon Tournament winner

2021–22 Southland Conference men's basketball standings
	Conf.				Overall
Team	W		L	PCT	W		L	PCT
Nicholls	11	–	3	.786	21	–	12	.636
Southeastern Louisiana	10	–	4	.714	19	–	15	.559
New Orleans	10	–	4	.714	18	–	14	.563
Texas A&M–Corpus Christi †	7	–	7	.500	23	–	12	.657
Houston Baptist	6	–	8	.429	11	–	18	.379
Northwestern State	5	–	9	.357	9	–	23	.281
McNeese State	4	–	10	.286	11	–	22	.333
Incarnate Word	3	–	11	.214	7	–	25	.219
† 2022 Southland tournament winner

2021–22 Summit League men's basketball standings
	Conf.				Overall
Team	W		L	PCT	W		L	PCT
South Dakota State †	18	–	0	1.000	30	–	5	.857
North Dakota State	13	–	5	.722	23	–	10	.697
Kansas City	12	–	6	.667	19	–	12	.613
Oral Roberts	12	–	6	.667	19	–	12	.613
South Dakota	11	–	7	.611	19	–	12	.613
Western Illinois	7	–	11	.389	16	–	16	.500
Denver	7	–	11	.389	11	–	21	.344
St. Thomas *	4	–	14	.222	10	–	20	.333
Omaha	4	–	14	.222	5	–	25	.167
North Dakota	2	–	16	.111	6	–	25	.194
† 2022 Summit League tournament winner * Ineligible for the 2022 NCAA tournament due to transition from Division III

2021–22 Sun Belt Conference men's basketball standings
	Conf.				Overall
Team	W		L	PCT	W		L	PCT
Texas State	12	–	3	.800	21	–	8	.724
Appalachian State	12	–	6	.667	19	–	15	.559
Georgia State †	9	–	5	.643	18	–	11	.621
Troy	10	–	6	.625	20	–	12	.625
South Alabama	9	–	7	.563	21	–	12	.636
Arkansas State	8	–	7	.533	18	–	11	.621
Coastal Carolina	8	–	8	.500	19	–	14	.576
Louisiana	8	–	9	.471	16	–	15	.516
UT Arlington	7	–	10	.412	11	–	18	.379
Georgia Southern	5	–	11	.313	13	–	16	.448
Louisiana–Monroe	5	–	13	.278	13	–	18	.419
Little Rock	3	–	11	.214	9	–	19	.321
† 2022 Sun Belt Tournament winner

2021–22 WAC men's basketball standings
	Conf.				Overall
Team	W		L	PCT	W		L	PCT
New Mexico State †	14	–	4	.778	27	–	7	.794
Seattle	14	–	4	.778	23	–	9	.719
Stephen F. Austin	14	–	4	.778	22	–	10	.688
Grand Canyon	13	–	5	.722	23	–	8	.742
Sam Houston State	13	–	5	.722	19	–	14	.576
Abilene Christian	11	–	7	.611	25	–	11	.694
Utah Valley	10	–	8	.556	20	–	12	.625
Tarleton State *	9	–	9	.500	14	–	17	.452
California Baptist *	7	–	11	.389	18	–	16	.529
Dixie State *	6	–	12	.333	13	–	17	.433
Texas–Rio Grande Valley	3	–	15	.167	8	–	23	.258
Chicago State	3	–	15	.167	7	–	25	.219
Lamar	0	–	18	.000	2	–	27	.069
† 2022 WAC tournament winner * ineligible for the 2022 NCAA tournament due to transition from NCAA Division II

2021–22 West Coast Conference men's basketball standings
	Conf.				Overall
Team	W		L	PCT	W		L	PCT
No. 1 Gonzaga †	13	–	1	.929	28	–	4	.875
No. 18 Saint Mary's	12	–	3	.800	26	–	8	.765
Santa Clara	10	–	5	.667	21	–	12	.636
San Francisco	10	–	6	.625	24	–	10	.706
BYU	9	–	6	.600	24	–	11	.686
Portland	7	–	7	.500	19	–	15	.559
San Diego	7	–	9	.438	15	–	16	.484
Pacific	3	–	11	.214	8	–	22	.267
Loyola Marymount	3	–	12	.200	11	–	18	.379
Pepperdine	1	–	15	.063	7	–	25	.219
† 2022 WCC tournament winner Rankings from AP poll

== Postseason ==
=== Tournament upsets ===
For this list, an "upset" is defined as a win by a team seeded 5 or more spots below its defeated opponent.

Date	Winner	Score	Loser	Region	Round
March 17	Michigan (#11) (Note: Entered the game as the betting favorite in Las Vegas sports books.)	75–63	Colorado State (#6)	South	First round
March 17	Richmond (#12)	67–63	Iowa (#5)	Midwest	First round
March 17	New Mexico State (#12)	70–63	UConn (#5)	West	First round
March 17	Saint Peter's (#15)	85–79^{OT}	Kentucky (#2)	East	First round
March 18	Notre Dame (#11)	78–64	Alabama (#6)	West	First round
March 18	Iowa State (#11)	59–54	LSU (#6)	Midwest	First round
March 19	North Carolina (#8)	93–86^{OT}	Baylor (#1)	East	Second round
March 19	Saint Peter's (#15)	70–60	Murray State (#7)	East	Second round
March 19	Michigan (#11)	76–68	Tennessee (#3)	South	Second round
March 20	Iowa State (#11)	54–49	Wisconsin (#3)	Midwest	Second round
March 20	Miami (FL) (#10)	79–61	Auburn (#2)	Midwest	Second round
March 25	Saint Peter's (#15)	67–64	Purdue (#3)	East	Sweet 16
April 2	North Carolina (#8)	81–77	Duke (#2)	East	Final Four

== Award winners ==
=== 2022 Consensus All-Americans ===
Consensus First Team
Player	Position	Class	Team
Ochai Agbaji	G	Senior	Kansas
Kofi Cockburn	C	Junior	Illinois
Johnny Davis	G/F	Sophomore	Wisconsin
Keegan Murray	F	Sophomore	Iowa
Oscar Tshiebwe	F	Junior	Kentucky

Consensus Second Team
Player	Position	Class	Team
Paolo Banchero	F	Freshman	Duke
Chet Holmgren	F	Freshman	Gonzaga
Jaden Ivey	G	Sophomore	Purdue
Bennedict Mathurin	G	Sophomore	Arizona
Jabari Smith	F	Freshman	Auburn
Drew Timme	F	Junior	Gonzaga

=== Major player of the year awards ===
- Wooden Award: Oscar Tshiebwe, Kentucky
- Naismith Award: Oscar Tshiebwe, Kentucky
- Associated Press Player of the Year: Oscar Tshiebwe, Kentucky
- NABC Player of the Year: Oscar Tshiebwe, Kentucky
- Oscar Robertson Trophy (USBWA): Oscar Tshiebwe, Kentucky
- Sporting News Player of the Year: Oscar Tshiebwe, Kentucky

=== Major freshman of the year awards ===
- Wayman Tisdale Award (USBWA): Jabari Smith, Auburn
- NABC Freshman of the Year: Jabari Smith, Auburn

=== Major coach of the year awards ===
- Associated Press Coach of the Year: Tommy Lloyd, Arizona
- Henry Iba Award (USBWA): Tommy Lloyd, Arizona
- NABC Coach of the Year: Tommy Lloyd, Arizona
- Naismith College Coach of the Year: Ed Cooley, Providence
- Sporting News Coach of the Year: Ed Cooley, Providence

=== Other major awards ===
- Naismith Starting Five:
  - Bob Cousy Award (best point guard): Collin Gillespie, Villanova
  - Jerry West Award (best shooting guard): Johnny Davis, Wisconsin
  - Julius Erving Award (best small forward): Wendell Moore Jr., Duke
  - Karl Malone Award (best power forward): Keegan Murray, Iowa
  - Kareem Abdul-Jabbar Award (best center): Oscar Tshiebwe, Kentucky
- Pete Newell Big Man Award (best big man): Oscar Tshiebwe, Kentucky
- NABC Defensive Player of the Year: Walker Kessler, Auburn
- Naismith Defensive Player of the Year: Walker Kessler, Auburn
- Lute Olson Award: Johnny Davis, Wisconsin
- Senior CLASS Award (top senior on and off the court): Jacob Gilyard, Richmond
- Robert V. Geasey Trophy (top player in Philadelphia Big 5): Collin Gillespie, Villanova
- Haggerty Award (top player in NYC metro area): Ron Harper Jr., Rutgers
- Ben Jobe Award (top minority coach): Kelvin Sampson, Houston
- Hugh Durham Award (top mid-major coach): Robert Jones, Norfolk State
- Jim Phelan Award (top head coach): Mark Adams, Texas Tech
- Lefty Driesell Award (top defensive player): KC Ndefo, Saint Peter's
- Lou Henson Award (top mid-major player): Malachi Smith, Chattanooga
- Skip Prosser Man of the Year Award (coach with moral character): Jay McAuley, Wofford
- Academic All-American of the Year (top scholar-athlete): Ben Vander Plas, Ohio
- Elite 90 Award (top GPA among upperclass players at Final Four): Michael Savarino, Duke
- Perry Wallace Most Courageous Award: Andrew Jones, Texas (shared with Justin Hardy of Division III Washington (MO))

== Coaching changes ==
Many teams will change coaches during the season and after it ends.

Team	Former coach	Interim coach	New coach	Reason
Alabama A&M	Dylan Howard		Otis Hughley	Alabama A&M parted ways with Howard on March 22, 2022 after four seasons and a 31–76 record. Otis Hughley Jr. was named the new head coach of the Bulldogs on April 18.
Alabama State	Mo Williams		Tony Madlock	Williams resigned on March 9, 2022 after two seasons and a 13–35 record at Alabama State. South Carolina State head coach Madlock was hired by the Hornets on April 11.
Ball State	James Whitford		Michael Lewis	Ball State announced on March 14, 2022 that Whitford will not return, finishing his nine-year tenure with a 131–148 record. UCLA assistant coach Lewis was hired by the Cardinals on March 25.
Butler	LaVall Jordan		Thad Matta	Butler fired Jordan on April 1, 2022 after five seasons, in which the Bulldogs went 83–74 with only one NCAA tournament appearance, and went 14–19 this year despite bringing back almost everyone from last year's roster. Former Butler head coach Matta, who was serving as associate athletic director at Indiana, was brought back on April 3.
Chattanooga	Lamont Paris		Dan Earl	Paris left Chattanooga after five seasons to accept the South Carolina job on March 24, 2022. The Mocs hired Dan Earl from conference foe VMI as their next head coach on March 31.
The Citadel	Duggar Baucom		Ed Conroy	The Citadel parted ways with Baucom on March 10, 2022 after a 77–136 record in seven seasons. Vanderbilt associate head coach Conroy, a Citadel alum who previously served as head coach of the Bulldogs from 2006 to 2010, was hired as his replacement on March 23.
Cleveland State	Dennis Gates		Daniyal Robinson	Gates left Cleveland State on March 22, 2022 after three seasons for the Missouri head coaching job. Iowa State assistant Robinson was hired by the Vikings on April 5.
Davidson	Bob McKillop		Matt McKillop	Bob McKillop announced his retirement on June 17, 2022, effective immediately. During his 33 seasons at Davidson, McKillop had a record of 634–380, with by far the most wins in program history; led the Wildcats to 10 NCAA tournament appearances, 15 regular-season conference titles (13 in the Southern Conference, 2 in the Atlantic 10 Conference), and 8 conference tournament titles (7 SoCon, 1 A-10); and was a conference coach of the year 11 times (9 SoCon, 2 A-10). His son Matt, a former Davidson player who had been on his staff since 2008 and had been his top assistant since 2016, was named as his successor.
Duke	Mike Krzyzewski		Jon Scheyer	Krzyzewski announced on June 2, 2021 that he would retire after the 2021–22 season, his 42nd at Duke. The university announced that former Blue Devils player and current top assistant Scheyer would succeed Krzyzewski.
East Carolina	Joe Dooley		Michael Schwartz	ECU fired Dooley, who was in his second stint as head coach, on March 11, 2022 after four seasons and a 44–67 record. The Pirates hired Tennessee assistant Schwartz as his replacement on March 16.
Elon	Mike Schrage		Billy Taylor	Schrage resigned from Elon on April 5, 2022 after three seasons to become an assistant coach at Duke. Iowa assistant Taylor was hired by the Phoenix on April 15.
Evansville	Todd Lickliter		David Ragland	Evansville fired Lickliter, along with his entire coaching staff, on May 5, 2022 after 2-plus seasons and a 15–53 record. Butler assistant coach and Evansville native Ragland was hired by the Purple Aces on May 24.
Fairleigh Dickinson	Greg Herenda		Tobin Anderson	FDU parted ways with Herenda on April 25, 2022 after nine seasons and a 105–164 record, including going 24–56 the last three seasons after making the NCAA tournament in 2019. Tobin Anderson, head coach at D2 St. Thomas Aquinas (NY) the past 9 seasons, was hired by the Knights on May 2.
Florida Gulf Coast	Michael Fly		Pat Chambers	FGCU parted ways with Fly on March 5, 2022 after four seasons and a 55–58 record. However, since the Eagles were invited to the inaugural TBC tournament, he was allowed to coach them during the tournament. Former Penn State head coach Chambers was hired by the school on March 14.
Florida	Mike White	Al Pinkins	Todd Golden	White left Florida on March 13, 2022 after seven seasons to take the opening at conference rival Georgia. Associate head coach Pinkins was named as interim head coach for Florida's postseason (ultimately the NIT). On March 18, the Gators hired San Francisco head coach Golden as the permanent replacement.
Fordham	Kyle Neptune		Keith Urgo	Neptune left Fordham on April 20, 2022 after a single season to return to his previous employer of Villanova as their new head coach. The Rams promoted associate head coach Urgo on April 28.
George Washington	Jamion Christian		Chris Caputo	GW parted ways with Christian on March 14, 2022 after three seasons and a 29–50 overall record. On April 1, Miami assistant coach Chris Caputo was named the new head coach of the Colonials.
Georgia	Tom Crean		Mike White	Georgia fired Crean on March 10, 2022 after four seasons. Under Crean, the Bulldogs were 47–75 overall, including a 6–26 record this season. Three days later, White was hired from conference rival Florida.
Georgia State	Rob Lanier		Jonas Hayes	Lanier left Georgia State on March 27, 2022 after three seasons to accept the SMU head coaching job. Xavier assistant coach Jonas Hayes, who led the Musketeers to the NIT Championship as the interim head coach, was hired by the Panthers on April 6.
High Point	Tubby Smith		G. G. Smith	The elder Smith announced his resignation on February 16, 2022 after 3½ seasons at his alma mater, with his son and Panthers associate head coach G. G. taking over.
Illinois State	Dan Muller	Brian Jones	Ryan Pedon	Illinois State initially announced on February 13, 2022 that Muller would not return as head coach in 2022–23, but would continue to coach the team through the end of the 2021–22 season. However, the following day, Muller informed the university that he was stepping down as head coach effective immediately, as he did not want to become a distraction to his players. Associate HC Brian Jones was subsequently named as interim head coach. Muller, a member of the school's Hall of Fame as a Redbirds player, was 167–150 overall in ten-plus seasons at ISU and 11–15 overall and 4–9 in conference play this season at the time of the announcement. On March 4, Ohio State assistant Pedon was named as the permanent replacement.
Jackson State	Wayne Brent		Mo Williams	Brent announced on March 4, 2022 that he would retire at the end of the season, his ninth at Jackson State. Jackson, MS native and former Alabama State head coach Williams was hired by the Tigers on March 14.
Kansas City	Billy Donlon		Marvin Menzies	Donlon and UMKC mutually agreed to part ways on April 21, 2022 after three seasons and a 46–39 record. Former New Mexico State and UNLV head coach Menzies was hired by the Roos on April 26.
Kansas State	Bruce Weber		Jerome Tang	On March 10, 2022, Weber announced his resignation from his position at Kansas State. Weber amassed a 184–147 overall record, including an 82–98 mark in Big 12 play during his ten-year tenure with the Wildcats. On March 21, longtime Baylor assistant Jerome Tang was hired as the new head coach.
Lafayette	Fran O'Hanlon		Mike Jordan	O'Hanlon, the winningest head coach in Patriot League history, announced on January 21, 2022 that he would retire at the end of the season after 27 years at Lafayette. Colgate assistant coach Jordan was hired by the Leopards on March 29.
La Salle	Ashley Howard		Fran Dunphy	La Salle fired Howard on March 21, 2022 after four seasons and a 45–71 record. Former Penn and Temple head coach and La Salle alum Fran Dunphy was hired by the Explorers on April 5.
LIU	Derek Kellogg		Rod Strickland	LIU fired Kellogg on June 30, 2022, after 5 seasons and replaced him with Strickland, who was serving as program director of NBA G League Ignite.
Louisiana Tech	Eric Konkol		Talvin Hester	Konkol left Louisiana Tech on March 21, 2022 after seven seasons to accept the Tulsa head coaching job. Texas Tech assistant Hester, who was an assistant coach with the Bulldogs from 2018 to 2021, was hired on March 28.
Louisville	Chris Mack	Mike Pegues	Kenny Payne	Mack and Louisville agreed to an immediate separation finalized on January 26, 2022. Mack, in his fourth season at Louisville, had led the Cardinals to an NCAA tournament berth in his first season in 2019 and missed out on a second berth due to COVID-19, but the Cardinals failed to make the NCAA tournament in 2021. In 2021–22, he was suspended for the first six games due to his alleged involvement in NCAA violations, and the Cardinals went 6–8 after his return amid speculation that he had lost the locker room. Top assistant Pegues, who had taken over for Mack during his suspension, was named interim head coach. Payne, a New York Knicks assistant and former Cardinals player, was officially announced as the permanent replacement on March 18.
LSU	Will Wade	Kevin Nickelberry	Matt McMahon	LSU fired Wade on March 12, 2022, four days after receiving a notice of allegations from the NCAA that accused Wade of five Level I violations of NCAA rules. While Wade was 108–54 in five seasons at LSU, his entire tenure took place in the shadow of the late-2010s federal investigation into recruiting-related corruption in D-I men's basketball. Top assistant Nickelberry was named interim head coach for the 2022 postseason. The Tigers hired Murray State's Matt McMahon as their new head coach on March 21.
Maine	Richard Barron	Jai Steadman	Chris Markwood	Maine and Barron mutually agreed to part ways on February 17, 2022 after 3½ seasons, in which the Bears went 21–75 overall. Assistant coach Steadman was named interim head coach for the rest of the season. Boston College assistant and Maine alum Markwood was named the permanent replacement on March 21.
Maryland	Mark Turgeon	Danny Manning	Kevin Willard	Turgeon resigned on December 4, 2021. Even though he had led the Terrapins to a 226–116 overall record in his ten-plus seasons, with five NCAA tournament appearances in the previous seven seasons, the Terrapins had finished in the Big Ten's top four only once in the past four seasons, and struggled to a 5–3 start in 2021–22. Manning, who had been hired as a Maryland assistant in 2020, was named interim head coach for the rest of the season. Seton Hall head coach Willard was hired by the school on March 21, 2022.
Miami (OH)	Jack Owens		Travis Steele	Miami and Owens mutually agreed to part ways on March 23, 2022 after five seasons, in which the Redhawks went 70–83 with one winning season. Former Xavier head coach Travis Steele was hired by the school on March 31.
Milwaukee	Pat Baldwin		Bart Lundy	Milwaukee fired Baldwin on March 2, 2022 after five seasons and a 57–92 overall record. Bart Lundy, head coach at Division II Queens College (NC) the past 9 years, was hired by the Panthers on March 19.
Mississippi State	Ben Howland		Chris Jans	Mississippi State fired Howland on March 17, 2022, the day after the Bulldogs' season ended with a first-round NIT loss. Howland, who had taken UCLA to three Final Fours, was unable to duplicate that success at State, only leading the Bulldogs to one NCAA tournament appearance in seven seasons. While the Bulldogs were 134–98 overall during Howland's tenure, they were 59–67 in the SEC and never finished higher than fourth in the conference. Jans, previously head coach at New Mexico State, was officially announced as Howland's replacement on March 20.
Mississippi Valley State	Lindsey Hunter		George Ivory	Hunter resigned from MVSU on March 11, 2022 after three seasons and a 7–75 record. Delta Devils assistant Ivory was promoted to head coach three days later.
Missouri	Cuonzo Martin		Dennis Gates	Martin was fired on March 11, 2022 after five seasons at Missouri, in which the Tigers were 78–77 overall. Cleveland State head coach Dennis Gates was hired as Martin's replacement on March 22.
Murray State	Matt McMahon		Steve Prohm	McMahon left Murray State after seven seasons to accept the LSU job on March 21, 2022. Steve Prohm, the man that McMahon took over for in 2015, was re-hired by the Racers on March 25.
New Mexico State	Chris Jans		Greg Heiar	Jans left New Mexico State on March 20, 2022 after five seasons for the Mississippi State opening. Heiar was hired by the Aggies on March 27, less than two weeks after having coached Northwest Florida State to the NJCAA Division I national title.
North Carolina A&T	Willie Jones	Phillip Shumpert	Monté Ross	Jones was fired from N.C A&T on August 18, 2022, although athletic director Earl Hilton would not comment on the specifics of Jones's firing. He had two years remaining on a four-year contract (through the 2023–24 season) that paid him a base salary of $194,750. Hilton said that Jones would be paid for 12 more months. Phillip Shumpert, an assistant coach, was appointed to lead the team in 2022–23. North Carolina A&T stated they would conduct a search for the new full-time head coach after the coming season. Jones went 37–35, including 24–15 against league opponents, after he took over for Jay Joyner in December 2019. After the season ended, Temple assistant and former Delaware head coach Ross was hired by the Aggies on April 10, 2023.
Northwestern State	Mike McConathy		Corey Gipson	McConathy retired on March 14, 2022 after 23 seasons at Northwestern State, finishing with 330 wins. Missouri State associate head coach Gipson was hired by the Demons a week later.
Omaha	Derrin Hansen		Chris Crutchfield	Omaha fired Hansen on March 6, 2022 after 17 seasons, including the Mavericks' transition from Division II to Division I, and a 253–260 overall record. On March 18, Oregon assistant coach and Omaha alum Crutchfield was hired as the new head coach.
Rhode Island	David Cox		Archie Miller	Cox was fired on March 11, 2022 after four seasons at Rhode Island, in which the Rams went 64–55 with no postseason appearances. It was reported on March 16 that the Rams were finalizing a deal with former Dayton and Indiana head coach Archie Miller to be their new head coach, which became official two days later.
Sacramento State	Brian Katz	Brandon Laird	David Patrick	Katz, citing health reasons, announced his retirement on November 5, 2021 after 13 seasons at Sacramento State. Current associate head coach Brandon Laird served as the interim head coach of the Hornets for the 2021–22 season. On April 5, 2022, Oklahoma associate head coach David Patrick was named the new coach of Sacramento State.
Saint Peter's	Shaheen Holloway		Bashir Mason	After the Peacocks' historic Elite Eight run as a 15 seed, Holloway departed Saint Peter's on March 30, 2022 after four seasons to accept the head coaching job at his alma mater of Seton Hall, where he was an assistant from 2010 to 2018. Wagner head coach Mason, a native of Saint Peter's home of Jersey City, was hired as his replacement on April 12.
San Diego	Sam Scholl		Steve Lavin	San Diego announced on March 6, 2022 that Scholl would not return as head coach, ending his four-year tenure at his alma mater with a 50–66 overall record. Former UCLA and St. John's head coach Steve Lavin was hired by the Toreros on April 6.
San Francisco	Todd Golden		Chris Gerlufsen	Golden left San Francisco on March 18, 2022 after three seasons for the Florida head coaching job. The Dons promoted associate head coach Gerlufsen that same day.
Seattle	Jim Hayford	Chris Victor		Hayford, who was set to begin his 5th season at Seattle, resigned on November 11, 2021, less than a week after he was placed on administrative leave and a report was published that he had twice repeated racial slurs. Redhawk assistant coach Victor was initially named as interim head coach for the season, but on March 1, 2022, Seattle removed the interim tag from Victor and officially named him head coach.
Seton Hall	Kevin Willard		Shaheen Holloway	Willard left Seton Hall on March 20, 2022 after 12 seasons for the Maryland head coaching job. Saint Peter's head coach and fellow Seton Hall alum Shaheen Holloway, who led the Peacocks to a miracle Elite Eight run as a 15 seed in this year's NCAA tournament, was hired as the school's next head coach on March 30. Holloway previously served as an assistant coach for the Pirates from 2010 to 2018 prior to taking the Saint Peter's job.
SMU	Tim Jankovich		Rob Lanier	Jankovich announced his retirement on March 22, 2022 after six seasons at SMU and 17 overall. The Mustangs hired Georgia State head coach Rob Lanier as their next head coach on March 27.
South Carolina	Frank Martin		Lamont Paris	South Carolina fired Martin on March 14, 2022 after ten seasons, in which the Gamecocks went 171–147 overall with only one NCAA tournament appearance (a Final Four run in 2017). The school officially hired Chattanooga's Lamont Paris as their next head coach on March 24.
South Carolina State	Tony Madlock		Erik Martin	Madlock left SC State on April 11, 2022 after one season for the Alabama State head coaching job. After a 3-month search, the Bulldogs hired West Virginia assistant Martin on July 11.
South Dakota	Todd Lee		Eric Peterson	South Dakota parted ways with Lee on March 10, 2022 after four seasons and a 66–52 record. Utah assistant coach Peterson, a former assistant with the Coyotes from 2014 to 2018, was hired on March 15.
Tulsa	Frank Haith		Eric Konkol	Haith announced his resignation from Tulsa on March 12, 2022. Under his eight-year tenure, the Golden Hurricane went 138–108 overall, but this season was the team's first 20-loss season since 2005. On March 21, Louisiana Tech head coach Eric Konkol was named the new coach at the school.
UMass	Matt McCall		Frank Martin	UMass announced on March 1, 2022 that McCall would not return as head coach after the season. McCall, who was in his fifth season at UMass, was 58–81 overall and 28–52 in the Atlantic 10. The Minutemen's only winning season under his tenure was 2020–21, when they were 8–7 overall and 6–4 in conference in a COVID-19-shortened campaign. At the time of the announcement, UMass was 12–16 (5–11 A-10) with two regular-season games remaining after a February 28 loss to Fordham. Former South Carolina and Kansas State head coach Martin was hired on March 25.
Villanova	Jay Wright		Kyle Neptune	Wright announced his retirement on April 20, 2022 after 21 seasons and a 520–197 record at Villanova, including four Final Four appearances and two national titles with the Wildcats. Neptune, who served ten total seasons on Wright's staff, with eight as an assistant, before leaving in 2021 to become Fordham head coach, was announced as Wright's successor.
VMI	Dan Earl		Andrew Wilson	Earl left VMI after seven seasons to accept the Chattanooga job on March 31, 2022. James Madison assistant coach Wilson was named the new head coach of the Keydets on April 11.
Wagner	Bashir Mason		Donald Copeland	Mason left Wagner on April 12, 2022 after ten seasons for the Saint Peter's head coaching job. Seton Hall assistant Copeland was hired by the Seahawks on April 21.
Weber State	Randy Rahe		Eric Duft	Rahe, the program's winningest head coach with 316 wins, announced his retirement on May 16, 2022 after 16 seasons and was succeeded by Wildcat assistant Duft.
Western Michigan	Clayton Bates		Dwayne Stephens	Western Michigan parted ways with Bates on March 7, 2022 after a 13–39 overall record in two seasons. Longtime Michigan State associate head coach Stephens was hired by the Broncos on April 4.
Xavier	Travis Steele	Jonas Hayes	Sean Miller	Xavier and Steele mutually agreed to part ways on March 16, 2022 after four seasons at the school with a 70–50 record and no NCAA Tournament appearances. The move came a day after the Musketeers defeated Cleveland State in the first round of the NIT. Assistant coach Hayes served as the team's interim head coach for the remainder of the NIT (which Xavier ultimately won). On March 19, Sean Miller, who was head coach at X from 2004 to 2009 before leaving for Arizona, was re-hired by the school.

== Attendances ==
The top 30 NCAA Division I men's basketball teams by average home attendance:

#	Team	Home games	Total attendance	Average attendance
1	Syracuse	16	320,279	20,017
2	Kentucky	18	348,082	19,338
3	Arkansas	19	361,412	19,022
4	North Carolina	17	315,115	18,536
5	Tennessee	16	291,236	18,202
6	Creighton	15	249,158	16,611
7	Wisconsin	16	264,075	16,505
8	Kansas	17	276,300	16,253
9	Indiana	18	285,208	15,845
10	Nebraska	19	290,371	15,283
11	Purdue	17	251,668	14,804
12	Michigan State	15	221,955	14,797
13	Illinois	16	235,044	14,690
14	Memphis	15	210,948	14,063
15	Texas Tech	18	251,515	13,973
16	BYU	17	235,540	13,855
17	Marquette	16	215,925	13,495
18	Arizona	17	228,040	13,414
19	Dayton	17	227,919	13,407
20	Ohio State	16	212,412	13,276
21	Louisville	16	211,867	13,242
22	Maryland	18	234,937	13,052
23	Iowa State	19	244,457	12,866
24	Virginia	18	230,275	12,793
25	Texas	19	235,563	12,398
26	NC State	17	207,165	12,186
27	Iowa	18	217,895	12,105
28	Michigan	15	179,294	11,953
29	West Virginia	17	196,098	11,535
30	San Diego State	15	169,972	11,331

== See also ==
- 2021–22 NCAA Division I women's basketball season
