= Jack Cotton (basketball) =

American basketball player

Personal information
- Born: October 25, 1924 Miles City, Montana, U.S.
- Died: September 26, 2016 (aged 91)
- Listed height: 6 ft 7 in (2.01 m)
- Listed weight: 200 lb (91 kg)

Career information
- College: Wyoming (1947–1948)
- Playing career: 1948–1950
- Position: Power forward / center
- Number: 28
- Coaching career: 1950–1967

Career history

Playing
- 1948–1950: Denver Nuggets

Coaching
- 1950–1953: Dodge City HS
- 1953–1955: Southwestern (KS)
- 1955–1959: Omaha
- 1959–1967: Adams State
- Stats at NBA.com
- Stats at Basketball Reference

John James Cotton (October 25, 1924 – September 26, 2016) was an American professional basketball small forward who played one season in the National Basketball Association (NBA) with the Denver Nuggets during the 1949–50 NBA season. He attended the University of Wyoming.

== Career playing statistics ==
Legend
GP	Games played	FGM	Field-goals made
FG%	Field-goal percentage	FTM	Free-throws made
FTA	Free-throws attempted	FT%	Free-throw percentage
APG	Assists per game	PTS	Points
PPG	Points per game	**Bold**	Career high

=== College ===
Year	Team	FGM	FTM	FTA	FT%	PTS
1947–48	Wyoming	18	11	22	.500	47

=== NBL ===
==== Regular season ====
Year	Team	GP	FGM	FTM	FTA	FT%	PTS	PPG
1948–49	Denver	57	71	67	121	.554	209	3.7

=== NBA ===
==== Regular season ====
Year	Team	GP	FG%	FT%	APG	PPG
1949–50	Denver	54	.292	.509	1.2	5.1
