= Lloyd M. Bradfield =

American football and basketball coach

Biographical details
- Born: February 15, 1901
- Died: June 7, 1986 (aged 85); Cass County, Minnesota

Coaching career (HC unless noted)

Football
- 1926–1927: Omaha

Basketball
- 1927–1929: Omaha

Head coaching record
- Overall: 5–11 (football); 3–27 (basketball)

Lloyd Merton Bradfield (February 15, 1901 – June 7, 1986) was an American football and basketball coach. He served as the head football coach (1926–1927) and head basketball (1927–1929) at the University—now known as of University of Nebraska–Omaha. Bradfield was also the school's dean of men.

== Head coaching record ==
=== Football ===
| Year | Team | Overall | Conference | Standing | Bowl/playoffs |
|---|---|---|---|---|---|
Omaha Cardinals (Nebraska College Athletic Conference) (1926–1927)
| 1926 | Omaha | 2–5 | 0–5 | T–12th | |
| 1927 | Omaha | 3–6 | 1–5 | 12th | |
| Omaha: | | 5–11 | 1–10 | | |
| Total: | | 5–11 | | | |
