= Cecil L. Hartman =

American football player and sports coach (1900–1988)

Biographical details
- Born: May 13, 1900
- Died: February 13, 1988 (aged 87); Omaha, Nebraska, U.S.

Playing career

Football
- 1921–1923: Nebraska
- Position: Fullback

Coaching career (HC unless noted)

Football
- 1925–1926: Tabor (IA)
- 1927–1929: Cotner (assistant)
- 1930: Cotner
- 1931–1942: Omaha

Basketball
- 1931–1935: Omaha

Track and field
- 1931–1943: Omaha

Administrative career (AD unless noted)
- 1931–1943: Omaha

Head coaching record
- Overall: 53–49–13 (football); 56–12 (basketball)

Accomplishments and honors

Championships
- Football; 1 NCAC (1930; 2 NIAA (1934–1935)

Cecil LeRoy "Sed" Hartman (May 13, 1900 – February 13, 1988) was an American college football player, coach of college football, college basketball and track and field, and athletics administrator. He served as the head football coach at Tabor College in Tabor, Iowa from 1925 to 1926, Cotner College in Lincoln, Nebraska in 1920, and the University of Omaha—now known as the University of Nebraska Omaha—from 1931 to 1942. He was also the head basketball coach at Omaha from 1931 to 1935, tallying a mark of 56–12. Hartman played college football for the Nebraska Cornhuskers football team from 1921 to 1923 and was a member of multiple Missouri Valley Conference championship teams.

Hartman served an officer in the United States Navy during World War II, reaching the rank of lieutenant commander before his discharge in 1945. He later worked in construction and real estate in Omaha, Nebraska. Hartman died in his sleep from apparent heart failure, on February 13, 1988, at the Paxton Manor in Omaha.

== Head coaching record ==
=== Football ===
Year	Team	Overall	Conference	Standing	Bowl/playoffs
Tabor Cardinals (Independent) (1925–1926)
1925	Tabor	5–3			
1926	Tabor	1–4–1			
Tabor:		6–7–1			
Cotner Bulldogs (Nebraska College Athletic Conference) (1930)
1930	Cotner	6–1–1	5–1	1st	
Cotner:		6–1–1	5–1		
Omaha Cardinals (Nebraska Intercollegiate Athletic Association) (1931–1933)
1931	Omaha	6–1–1	1–1–1	T–2nd	
1932	Omaha	5–2–1	2–0–1	2nd	
1933	Omaha	5–3–1	2–1–1	2nd	
1934	Omaha	4–1–2	3–0–1	1st	
Omaha Cardinals (Nebraska Intercollegiate Athletic Association / North Central Conference) (1935)
1935	Omaha	6–3	4–0 / 1–3	1st / 6th	
Omaha Cardinals/Indians (North Central Conference) (1936–1942)
1936	Omaha	2–3–2	1–2–2	5th	
1937	Omaha	2–6	0–5	7th	
1938	Omaha	2–5–1	1–3–1	6th	
1939	Omaha	3–5	1–3	4th	
1940	Omaha	2–3–2	1–3–1	6th	
1941	Omaha	3–4–1	2–3	4th	
1942	Omaha	1–5	0–4	8th	
Omaha:		41–41–11			
Total:		53–49–13			
National championship Conference title Conference division title or championship game berth
