= Derrin Hansen =

American basketball player and coach

Biographical details
- Born: December 15, 1967 (age 58)

Playing career
- 1987–1991: Nebraska Wesleyan

Coaching career (HC unless noted)
- 1991–1993: Elmwood-Murdock HS
- 1993–1995: Nebraska–Kearney (GA)
- 1995–1998: Mid-Plains CC (assistant)
- 1998–2005: Omaha (assistant)
- 2005–2022: Omaha

Head coaching record
- Overall: 253–260 (.493)

Accomplishments and honors

Awards
- Summit League Coach of the Year (2019)

Derrin Hansen (born December 15, 1967) is an American college basketball coach who was most recently the head men's basketball coach at University of Nebraska Omaha. He became head coach after coach Kevin McKenna left to become an assistant at Creighton in July 2005. Hansen was named Summit League Coach of the Year in 2019, after leading the Mavericks to a Division I-program record 19 victories. On March 6, 2022, UNO athletic director Adrian Dowell decided to "make a change in leadership for the head coach position" after two straight 5-win seasons, dismissing Hansen after 17 seasons.

== Early life ==
Hansen is a native of St. Paul, Nebraska and attended Nebraska Wesleyan University in Lincoln, Nebraska.

== Head coaching record ==
Record table
Season	Team	Overall	Conference	Standing	Postseason
Omaha Mavericks (North Central Conference) (2005–2008)
2005–06	Omaha	15–16	4–8	6th	
2006–07	Omaha	12–16	3–10	6th	
2007–08	Omaha	25–7	7–5	3rd	NCAA Div II Regional semifinals
Omaha Mavericks (Mid-America Intercollegiate Athletics Association) (2008–2011)
2008–09	Omaha	17–11	11–9		
2009–10	Omaha	22–9	12–8		NCAA Div II Quarterfinals
2010–11	Omaha	19–9	15–7		
Omaha Mavericks (Independent) (2011–2012)
2011–12	Omaha	11–18			
Omaha Mavericks (The Summit League) (2012–2022)
2012–13	Omaha	11–20	6–10	6th	
2013–14	Omaha	17–15	5–9	6th	CIT second round
2014–15	Omaha	12–17	5–11	8th	
2015–16	Omaha	18–14	10–6	3rd	CBI first round
2016–17	Omaha	18–14	9–7	3rd	
2017–18	Omaha	9–22	4–10	7th	
2018–19	Omaha	21–11	13–3	2nd	
2019–20	Omaha	16–16	9–7	T–4th	
2020–21	Omaha	5–19	3–11	8th	
2021–22	Omaha	5–25	4–14	9th	
Omaha:		253–260 (.493)	120–135 (.471)		
Total:		253–260 (.493)			
National champion Postseason invitational champion Conference regular season champion Conference regular season and conference tournament champion Division regular season champion Division regular season and conference tournament champion Conference tournament champion
