= Chris Crutchfield =

American basketball coach (born 1968)

Current position
- Title: Head coach
- Team: Omaha
- Conference: Summit
- Record: 62–71 (.466)

Biographical details
- Born: December 20, 1968 (age 57); Hopkinsville, Kentucky, U.S.

Playing career
- 1989–1992: Omaha

Coaching career (HC unless noted)
- 1995–1996: Omaha (assistant)
- 1996–1997: UTSA (assistant)
- 1997–1999: Tyler JC (assistant)
- 1999–2001: Tyler JC
- 2001–2005: New Mexico State (assistant)
- 2006–2007: TCU (assistant)
- 2007–2011: Oral Roberts (assistant)
- 2011–2019: Oklahoma (assistant)
- 2019–2020: Arkansas (assistant)
- 2020–2021: East Central
- 2021–2022: Oregon (assistant)
- 2022–present: Omaha

Administrative career (AD unless noted)
- 2005–2006: TCU (DBO)

Head coaching record
- Overall: 62–71 (.466) (NCAA DI); 10–9 (.526) (NCAA DII); 35–29 (.547) (NJCAA)
- Tournaments: 0–1 (NCAA DI)

Accomplishments and honors

Championships
- Summit League regular season (2025); Summit League tournament (2025)

Awards
- Ben Jobe Award (2025); Summit League Coach of the Year (2025)

Chris DeShawn Crutchfield (born December 20, 1968) is an American basketball coach who is the current head coach of the Omaha Mavericks men's basketball team.

== Playing career ==
Crutchfield was a two-sport athlete at Omaha, where he was a member of the basketball and football teams.

== Coaching career ==
Beginning his coaching career at his alma mater Omaha, Crutchfield would then move to UTSA before landing at Tyler Junior College where he would be an assistant, then head coach from 1999 to 2001 where he would compile a 35–29 overall record. Crutchfield would then join Lou Henson's staff at New Mexico State from 2001 to 2005 before assistant coaching stops at TCU and Oral Roberts.

In 2011, Crutchfield landed on Lon Kruger's coaching staff at Oklahoma where he was a part of six NCAA Tournament appearances, including the Sooners' 2016 Final Four team. In 2019, Crutchfield would join Eric Musselman at Arkansas for a single season before taking the head coaching position at East Central, a Division II institution. In his lone season at the helm of East Central, Crutchfield guided the team to a 10–9 mark before heading back to the Division I ranks as an assistant under Dana Altman at Oregon.

On March 18, 2022, Crutchfield was named the 22nd head coach in Omaha men's basketball history, replacing Derrin Hansen.

== Head coaching record ==
Record table
Season	Team	Overall	Conference	Standing	Postseason
Tyler JC (NJCAA Region XIV) (1999–2001)
1999–00	Tyler JC	20–13	N/A		
2000–01	Tyler JC	15–16	N/A		
Tyler JC:		35–29 (.547)	0–0 (–)		
East Central Tigers (GAC) (2020–2021)
2020–21	East Central	10–9	9–8		
East Central:		10–9 (.526)	9–8 (.529)		
Omaha Mavericks (Summit) (2022–present)
2022–23	Omaha	9–23	4–14	10th	
2023–24	Omaha	15–18	7–9	6th	
2024–25	Omaha	22–13	13–3	1st	NCAA Division I Round of 64
2025–26	Omaha	16–17	8–8	T–4th	
2026–27	Omaha	0–0	0–0		
Omaha:		62–71 (.466)	33–33 (.500)		
Total:		107–109 (.495)			
National champion Postseason invitational champion Conference regular season champion Conference regular season and conference tournament champion Division regular season champion Division regular season and conference tournament champion Conference tournament champion
