= Omaha Mavericks men's basketball =

Basketball team of the University of Nebraska, Omaha

2026–27 Omaha Mavericks men's basketball team
- University: University of Nebraska Omaha
- Head coach: Chris Crutchfield (5th season)
- Location: Omaha, Nebraska
- Arena: Baxter Arena (capacity: 7,898)
- Conference: Summit League
- Nickname: Mavericks
- Colors: Crimson and black

NCAA Division I tournament Sweet Sixteen
- NCAA Division II; 1975, 1982

NCAA Division I tournament appearances
- NCAA Division II; 1975, 1976, 1977, 1979, 1982, 1983, 1984, 2002, 2004, 2005, 2008, 2010 NCAA Division I 2025

Conference tournament champions
- North Central: 2004, 2008; MIAA: 2010; Summit League: 2025

Conference regular-season champions
- North Central: 1979, 1984, 2004, 2005; Summit League: 2025

Uniforms
Home	Away

The Omaha Mavericks men's basketball team, also called the Nebraska–Omaha Mavericks, (Note: Although the school has completed the rebranding of its athletic program as "Omaha", and both The Summit League and National Collegiate Hockey Conference now follow this usage, national media such as ESPN usually use the hyphenated "Nebraska-Omaha".) represents the University of Nebraska Omaha in Omaha, Nebraska, United States. The Mavericks compete in The Summit League. Led by head coach Chris Crutchfield, they play their games at the on-campus Baxter Arena, which they moved to at the start of the 2015–16 season.

The 2015–16 season was also the first in which they were eligible for the NCAA tournament, NIT, or Summit League tournament; they had been ineligible during the school's four-year transition from Division II to Division I, which began in the 2011–12 season. During this period, they made one appearance in the CIT, a tournament which is not directly sponsored by the NCAA, in 2014. They made their first ever appearance in the NCAA Division I men's basketball tournament in 2025 after winning the Summit League tournament.

== History ==
=== Conference affiliations ===
- Independent – 1910–11 to 1933–34
- North Central Conference – 1934–35 to 1942–43
- Independent – 1943–44 to 1976–77
- North Central Conference – 1977–78 to 2007–08
- Mid-America Intercollegiate Athletics Association – 2008–09 to 2010–11
- NCAA Division I Independent – 2011–12
- Summit League – 2012–13 to Present

=== Season-by-season results ===
Record table
Season	Coach	Overall	Conference	Standing	Postseason
Gus Miller (1910–1912)
1910–11	Gus Miller	–	–	–	–
1911–12	Gus Miller	–	–	–	–
Gus Miller:		–	–		
Dutch Nagle (1912–1913)
1912–13	Dutch Nagle	3–2	–	–	–
Dutch Nagle:		3–2	–		
Jim Meyers (1913–1916)
1913–14	Jim Meyers	–	–	–	–
1914–15	Jim Meyers	5–1	–	–	–
1915–16	Jim Meyers	4–4	–	–	–
Jim Meyers:		9–5	–		
Ed Evans (1918–1919)
1918–19	Ed Evans	1–12	–	–	–
Ed Evans:		1–12	–		
Ernie Adams (1919–1927)
1919–20	Ernie Adams	13–1	–	–	–
1920–21	Ernie Adams	9–1	–	–	–
1921–22	Ernie Adams	6–4	–	–	–
1922–23	Ernie Adams	9–3	–	–	–
1923–24	Ernie Adams	3–8	–	–	–
1924–25	Ernie Adams	4–4	–	–	–
1925–26	Ernie Adams	8–3	–	–	–
1926–27	Ernie Adams	6–10	–	–	–
Ernie Adams:		56–34	–		
Lloyd M. Bradfield (1927–1929)
1927–28	Lloyd M. Bradfield	0–16	–	–	–
1928–29	Lloyd M. Bradfield	3–11	–	–	–
Lloyd M. Bradfield:		3–27	–		
Bill Graves (1929–1931)
1929–30	Bill Graves	2–12	–	–	–
1930–31	Bill Graves	6–9	–	–	–
Bill Graves:		8–21	–		
Cecil L. Hartman (1931–1934)
1931–32	Cecil L. Hartman	20–0	–	–	–
1932–33	Cecil L. Hartman	10–4	–	–	–
1933–34	Cecil L. Hartman	14–4	–	–	–
Cecil L. Hartman (North Central Conference) (1934–1935)
1934–35	Cecil L. Hartman	12–4	3–4	4th	–
Cecil L. Hartman:		56–12	3–4		
Johnny Baker (North Central Conference) (1935–1938)
1935–36	Johnny Baker	4–10	3–9	7th	–
1936–37	Johnny Baker	4–11	1–6	7th	–
1937–38	Johnny Baker	2–9	1–6	6th	–
Johnny Baker:		10–30	5–21		
Stu Baller (North Central Conference) (1938–1941)
1938–39	Stu Baller	8–9	2–6	7th	–
1939–40	Stu Baller	6–3	2–6	5th	–
1940–41	Stu Baller	12–13	5–3	3rd	–
Harold Johnk (North Central Conference) (1941–1943)
1941–42	Harold Johnk	6–15	3–5	5th	–
1942–43	Harold Johnk	4–7	0–6	8th	–
Stu Baller (1943–1944)
1943–44	Stu Baller	9–4	–	–	–
Stu Baller:		35–29	9–15		
Harold Johnk (1945–1948)
1945–46	Harold Johnk	4–15	–	–	–
1946–47	Harold Johnk	9–10	–	–	–
1947–48	Harold Johnk	7–13	–	–	–
Harold Johnk:		30–50	3–11		
Don Pflasterer (1948–1952)
1948–49	Don Pflasterer	10–10	–	–	–
1949–50	Don Pflasterer	13–10	–	–	–
1950–51	Don Pflasterer	4–15	–	–	–
1951–52	Don Pflasterer	13–11	–	–	–
Don Pflasterer:		40–46	–		
Virgil Yelkin (1952–1955)
1952–53	Virgil Yelkin	15–8	–	–	–
1953–54	Virgil Yelkin	10–15	–	–	–
1954–55	Virgil Yelkin	15–10	–	–	–
Virgil Yelkin:		40–33	–		
Jack Cotton (1955–1959)
1955–56	Jack Cotton	6–18	–	–	–
1956–57	Jack Cotton	9–16	–	–	–
1957–58	Jack Cotton	9–18	–	–	–
1958–59	Jack Cotton	3–33	–	–	–
Jack Cotton:		27–85	–		
Sonny Means (1959–1961)
1959–60	Sonny Means	4–18	–	–	–
1960–61	Sonny Means	3–19	–	–	–
Sonny Means:		7–37	–		
Jim Borsheim (1961–1969)
1961–62	Jim Borsheim	5–14	–	–	–
1962–63	Jim Borsheim	10–11	–	–	–
1963–64	Jim Borsheim	12–10	–	–	–
1964–65	Jim Borsheim	10–13	–	–	–
1965–66	Jim Borsheim	8–14	–	–	–
1966–67	Jim Borsheim	13–10	–	–	–
1967–68	Jim Borsheim	8–13	–	–	–
1968–69	Jim Borsheim	7–16	–	–	–
Jim Borsheim:		73–101	–		
Bob Hanson (1969–1977)
1969–70	Bob Hanson	16–10	–	–	–
1970–71	Bob Hanson	12–12	–	–	–
1971–72	Bob Hanson	12–14	–	–	–
1972–73	Bob Hanson	17–11	–	–	–
1973–74	Bob Hanson	17–9	–	–	–
1974–75	Bob Hanson	17–11	–	–	NCAA Regional Finals
1975–76	Bob Hanson	16–13	–	–	NCAA regional semifinals
1976–77	Bob Hanson	17–12	–	–	NCAA regional semifinals
Bob Hanson (North Central Conference) (1977–1994)
1977–78	Bob Hanson	9–18	7–7	5th	–
1978–79	Bob Hanson	20–9	9–3	1st	NCAA regional semifinals
1979–80	Bob Hanson	12–14	6–8	5th	–
1980–81	Bob Hanson	17–11	9–5	3rd	–
1981–82	Bob Hanson	22–7	11–3	2nd	NCAA Regional Finals
1982–83	Bob Hanson	19–11	14–4	2nd	NCAA regional semifinals
1983–84	Bob Hanson	23–7	15–3	1st	NCAA regional semifinals
1984–85	Bob Hanson	13–15	8–10	7th	–
1985–86	Bob Hanson	19–9	11–7	2nd	–
1986–87	Bob Hanson	14–14	8–10	6th	–
1987–88	Bob Hanson	14–14	7–11	9th	–
1988–89	Bob Hanson	14–14	6–12	8th	–
1989–90	Bob Hanson	21–9	13–5	2nd	–
1990–91	Bob Hanson	17–13	9–9	6th	–
1991–92	Bob Hanson	15–13	9–9	6th	–
1992–93	Bob Hanson	5–21	2–16	10th	–
1993–94	Bob Hanson	4–22	2–16	10th	–
Bob Hanson:		382–313	146–138		
Tim Carter (North Central Conference) (1994–1995)
1994–95	Tim Carter	11–16	5–13	10th	–
Tim Carter:		11–16	5–13		
Kevin Lehman (North Central Conference) (1995–2001)
1995–96	Kevin Lehman	6–21	1–17	10th	–
1996–97	Kevin Lehman	13–14	6–12	7th	–
1997–98	Kevin Lehman	11–16	5–13	9th	–
1998–99	Kevin Lehman	15–12	8–10	6th	–
1999–00	Kevin Lehman	18–11	10–8	5th	–
2000–01	Kevin Lehman	9–17	3–15	10th	–
Kevin Lehman:		72–91	33–75		
Kevin McKenna (North Central Conference) (2001–2005)
2001–02	Kevin McKenna	24–9	13–5	2nd	NCAA regional semifinals
2002–03	Kevin McKenna	20–10	8–8	6th	–
2003–04	Kevin McKenna	22–8	10–4	1st	NCAA regional quarterfinals
2004–05	Kevin McKenna	23–6	9–3	1st	NCAA regional quarterfinals
Kevin McKenna:		89–33	40–20		
Derrin Hansen (North Central Conference) (2005–2008)
2005–06	Derrin Hansen	15–16	4–8	6th	–
2006–07	Derrin Hansen	12–16	3–10	6th	–
2007–08	Derrin Hansen	25–7	7–5	3rd	NCAA regional semifinals
Derrin Hansen (Mid-America Intercollegiate Athletics Association) (2008–2011)
2008–09	Derrin Hansen	17–11	11–9	–	–
2009–10	Derrin Hansen	22–9	12–8	–	NCAA regional quarterfinals
2010–11	Derrin Hansen	19–10	15–7	–	–
Derrin Hansen (2011–2012)
2011–12	Derrin Hansen	11–18	Independent	–	–
Derrin Hansen (Summit League) (2012–2022)
2012–13	Derrin Hansen	11–20	6–10	6th	–
2013–14	Derrin Hansen	17–15	5–9	6th	CIT 2nd Round
2014–15	Derrin Hansen	12–17	5–11	8th	–
2015–16	Derrin Hansen	18–14	10–6	3rd	CBI 1st Round
2016–17	Derrin Hansen	18–14	9–7	3rd	-
2017–18	Derrin Hansen	9–22	4–10	7th	-
2018–19	Derrin Hansen	21–11	13–3	2nd	-
2019–20	Derrin Hansen	16–16	9–7	5th	-
2020–21	Derrin Hansen	5–19	3–11	8th	
2021–22	Derrin Hansen	5–25	4–14	9th	
Derrin Hansen:		253–260	120–133		
Chris Crutchfield (Summit League) (2022–Present)
2022–23	Chris Crutchfield	9–23	4–14	10th	
2023–24	Chris Crutchfield	15–18	7–9	6th	
2024–25	Chris Crutchfield	22–12	13–3	1st	NCAA tournament
2025–26	Chris Crutchfield	16–17	8–8	T–4th	
Chris Crutchfield:		72–70	32–34		
Total:		1,212–1,289	389–455		
National champion Postseason invitational champion Conference regular season champion Conference regular season and conference tournament champion Division regular season champion Division regular season and conference tournament champion Conference tournament champion

== Postseason ==
=== NCAA Division I ===
Year	Seed	Round	Opponent	Result
2025	#15	First Round	#2 St. John's	L 53–83

=== NCAA Division II ===
The Mavericks have appeared in 12 NCAA Division II Tournaments. Their combined record is 7–14.

Year	Round	Opponent	Result
1975	Regional semifinals Regional Finals	Augustana (SD); North Dakota	W 69–61; L 71–84
1976	Regional semifinals Regional 3rd-place game	North Dakota; Mankato State	L 74–86 ^{OT} L 73–95
1977	Regional semifinals Regional 3rd-place game	Green Bay; Augustana (SD)	L 63–89; W 93–91
1979	Regional semifinals Regional 3rd-place game	Northern Iowa; North Dakota	L 72–84; W 86–75
1982	Regional semifinals Finals	Lewis; North Dakota	W 78–69; L 75–83
1983	Regional semifinals Regional 3rd-place game	Morningside; Ferris State	L 79–80; L 75–81
1984	Regional semifinals Regional 3rd-place game	Wayne State; Northern Michigan	L 70–82; W 84–81
2002	Regional Quarterfinals; Regional semifinals	Fort Lewis; South Dakota State	W 88–58; L 76–96
2004	Regional Quarterfinals	South Dakota	L 71–82
2005	Regional Quarterfinals	Winona State	L 58–64
2008	Regional Quarterfinals; Regional semifinals	Fort Lewis; Winona State	W 82–76; L 67–80
2010	Regional Quarterfinals	Tarleton State	L 71–75

=== NAIA tournament results ===
The Mavericks have appeared in the NAIA tournament one time. Their record is 0–1.

Year	Round	Opponent	Result
1941	First round	Baltimore	L 35–52

=== CIT results ===
The Mavericks have appeared in one CollegeInsider.com Postseason Tournament (CIT). Their record is 1–1.

Year	Round	Opponent	Result
2014	First round Second Round	North Dakota; Murray State	W 91–75; L 62–86

=== CBI results ===
The Mavericks have appeared in one College Basketball Invitational (CBI). Their record is 0–1.

Year	Round	Opponent	Result
2016	First round	Duquesne	L 112–120

== Notable players ==
=== All–Americans ===
- 1992: Phil Cartwright

=== All–Conference ===
==== All–NCC Team ====
- 1940: Ron Salyards, Forward
- 1941: Ron Salyards, Forward
- 1941: Robert Mathews, Guard
- 1942: Robert Mathews, Guard
- 1979: Derrick Jackson, Guard
- 1979: Rick Wilks, Forward
- 1981: Jim Gregory, Forward
- 1982: Dean Thompson, Guard
- 1983: Dean Thompson, Guard
- 1984: Dean Thompson, Guard
- 1983: Terry Sodawasser, Center
- 1986: Dwayne King, Guard
- 1987: Mark Miller, Guard
- 1988: Bryan Leach, Guard
- 1990: Trent Neal, Guard
- 1990: Phil Cartwright, Center
- 1991: Thor Palamore, Forward
- 1992: Phil Cartwright, Center
- 1996: John Skokan, Center
- 1999: Corey Griffin, Forward
- 2002: Alvin Mitchell, Guard
- 2002: Adam Wetzel, Center
- 2003: Adam Wetzel, Center
- 2004: Tola Dada, Forward
- 2004: Ty Graham, Forward
- 2005: Ryan Curtis, Forward
- 2005: Calvin Kapels, Guard
- 2005: Abdul Mills, Guard
- 2006: Calvin Kapels, Guard
- 2008: Michael Jenkins

==== All–MIAA Team ====
- 2009: Michael Jenkins
- 2010: Tyler Bullock & Andrew Bridger
- 2011: Tyler Bullock & Mitch Albers

==== All–Summit Team ====
- 2016: Tra-Deon Hollins
- 2017: Tra-Deon Hollins
- 2019: Mitch Hahn
- 2019: Zach Jackson
- 2024: Frankie Fidler
- 2025: Marquel Sutton
- 2025: JJ White
- 2026: Paul Djobet

=== Summit League Player of the Year ===
- 2025: Marquel Sutton

=== NCC Player of the Year ===
- 1984: Dean Thompson
- 2004: Tola Dada

=== NCC Freshman of the Year ===
- 2003: Ryan Curtis

=== UNO 1,000 Points/500 Rebounds club ===
- Player (Years) Points/Rebounds
- Sam Singleton (1962–66) 1,101/508
- Bill Haas (1964–67) 1,064/518
- Pat Roehrig (1971–75) 1,006/640
- Dennis Forrest (1973–77) 1,660/557
- Glenn Moberg (1975–79) 1,077/531
- Terry Sodawasser (1981–85) 1,093/625
- Thor Palamore (1987–91) 1,309/476
- Phil Cartwright (1988–92) 1,457/946
- Tola Dada (2000–04) 1,017/583
- Ryan Curtis (2002–06) 1,051/717
- Calvin Kapels (2002–06) 1,102/571
- John Karhoff (2010–2014) 1,348/524
- Tre'Shawn Thurman (2014–17) 1,164/624
- Marquel Sutton (2022–25) 1,373/633
