= Kevin McKenna (basketball) =

American basketball player and coach (born 1959)

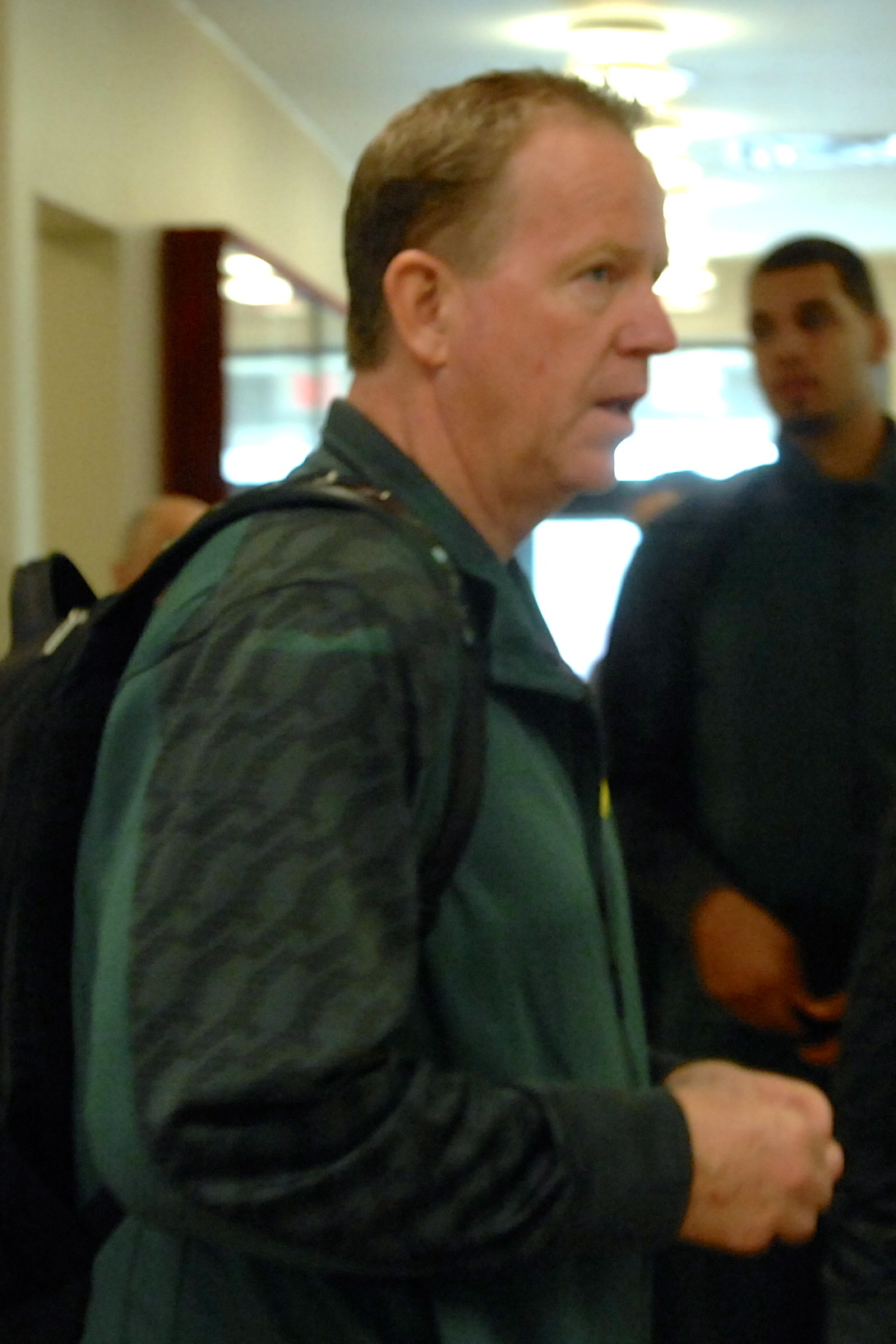

Oregon Ducks
- Title: Assistant head coach
- League: Pac-12 Conference

Personal information
- Born: January 8, 1959 (age 67) Saint Paul, Minnesota, U.S.
- Listed height: 6 ft 5 in (1.96 m)
- Listed weight: 195 lb (88 kg)

Career information
- High school: Palatine Township (Palatine, Illinois)
- College: Creighton (1977–1981)
- NBA draft: 1981: 4th round, 88th overall pick
- Drafted by: Los Angeles Lakers
- Playing career: 1981–1990
- Position: Shooting guard
- Number: 30, 21, 33, 3, 12
- Coaching career: 1989–present

Career history

Playing
- 1981–1982: Los Angeles Lakers
- 1982–1983: Las Vegas/Albuquerque Silvers
- 1983–1984: Indiana Pacers
- 1984–1985: New Jersey Nets
- 1985–1986: Kansas City Sizzlers
- 1986: Washington Bullets
- 1986–1988: New Jersey Nets
- 1989–1990: La Crosse Catbirds

Coaching
- 1989–1990: La Crosse Catbirds (assistant)
- 1990–1993: Sioux Falls Skyforce
- 1994–2001: Creighton (assistant)
- 2001–2005: Nebraska–Omaha
- 2005–2007: Creighton (assistant)
- 2007–2010: Indiana State
- 2010–present: Oregon (assistant)

Career highlights
- As player: NBA champion (1982); 2× First-team All-MVC (1980, 1981); As head coach: 2× NCC regular season champion (2004, 2005); NCC Tournament champion (2004); 2× NCC Coach of the Year (2004, 2005)
- Stats at NBA.com
- Stats at Basketball Reference

Kevin Robert McKenna (born January 8, 1959) is an American former basketball player. He is currently an assistant basketball coach at the University of Oregon. Born in Saint Paul, Minnesota, McKenna played professionally in the National Basketball Association (NBA) from 1981 to 1988. He played college basketball for the Creighton Bluejays.

McKenna was the 19th pick in the fourth round of the 1981 NBA draft by the Los Angeles Lakers.

He spent four highly successful years as head coach of NCAA Division II Nebraska-Omaha, where he guided the Mavericks to four consecutive 20-win seasons, two North Central Conference titles and three appearances in the NCAA Division II Tournament.

McKenna was named the NCC Coach of the Year in both 2004 and 2005 as well as North Central Regional Coach of the Year by the National Association of Basketball Coaches (NABC) in 2005. He finished with an 89–33 mark in his tenure at UNO.

As a high school player, McKenna starred at Palatine High School in Palatine, Illinois before moving on to Creighton University from 1977 to 1981. McKenna led the Creighton Bluejays to a Missouri Valley Conference (MVC) regular-season championship, two MVC Tournament titles and a pair of NCAA Tournaments. He was an All-MVC pick and team MVP in each of his final two seasons.

He remains the only person in MVC history to win an MVC regular-season title, an MVC Tournament championship, an NBA championship and a CBA title.

In the summer of 2009, McKenna was selected as the head coach of the Athletes in action AIA college basketball team during a tour of Poland and Germany.

== Career playing statistics ==
Legend
GP	Games played	GS	Games started	MPG	Minutes per game
FG%	Field goal percentage	3P%	3-point field goal percentage	FT%	Free throw percentage
RPG	Rebounds per game	APG	Assists per game	SPG	Steals per game
BPG	Blocks per game	PPG	Points per game	**Bold**	Career high

=== NBA ===
==== Regular season ====
Year	Team	GP	GS	MPG	FG%	3P%	FT%	RPG	APG	SPG	BPG	PPG
1981–82	L.A. Lakers	36	0	6.6	.322	.000	.647	.8	.4	.3	.1	1.9
1983–84	Indiana	**61**	**13**	15.1	.410	.176	.816	1.6	1.9	.8	.1	6.3
1984–85	New Jersey	29	7	**18.4**	**.455**	.385	.884	**1.7**	**2.0**	**1.0**	**.2**	5.7
1985–86	Washington	30	1	14.3	.367	.360	.833	1.2	.8	**1.0**	.1	5.8
1986–87	New Jersey	56	3	16.8	.454	**.419**	.754	1.4	1.7	**1.0**	.1	**7.2**
1987–88	New Jersey	31	2	12.7	.394	.320	**.960**	1.0	1.3	.5	.1	4.1
Career		243	26	14.2	.414	.367	.819	1.3	1.4	.8	.1	5.4

==== Playoffs ====
Year	Team	GP	GS	MPG	FG%	3P%	FT%	RPG	APG	SPG	BPG	PPG
1986	Washington	1	0	2.0	–	–	–	.0	.0	.0	.0	.0

== Head coaching record ==
Record table
Season	Team	Overall	Conference	Standing	Postseason
Nebraska-Omaha (North Central Conference) (2001–2005)
2001–02	Nebraska–Omaha	24–9	13–5		NCAA II North Central Regional
2002–03	Nebraska–Omaha	20–10	8–8		
2003–04	Nebraska Omaha	22–8	10–4	1st	NCAA II North Central Regional
2004–05	Nebraska Omaha	23–6	9–3	1st	NCAA II North Central Regional
Nebraska–Omaha:		89–33 (.730)	40–20 (.667)		
Indiana State (Missouri Valley Conference) (2007–2010)
2007–08	Indiana State	15–16	8–10	T–7th	
2008–09	Indiana State	11–21	7–11	9th	
2009–10	Indiana State	17–15	9–9	T–5th	CBI First Round
Indiana State:		43–52 (.453)	24–30 (.444)		
Total:		132–85 (.608)			
National champion Postseason invitational champion Conference regular season champion Conference regular season and conference tournament champion Division regular season champion Division regular season and conference tournament champion Conference tournament champion
