= 2020–21 Oral Roberts Golden Eagles men's basketball team =

American college basketball season

2020–21 Oral Roberts Golden Eagles men's basketball

Summit League tournament champions

NCAA tournament, Sweet Sixteen
- Conference: Summit League
- Record: 18–11 (10–5 The Summit)
- Head coach: Paul Mills (4th season)
- Assistant coaches: Solomon Bozeman; Russell Springmann; Sam Patterson
- Home arena: Mabee Center

2020–21 Summit League men's basketball standings
	Conf.				Overall
Team	W		L	PCT	W		L	PCT
South Dakota State	9	–	3	.750	16	–	7	.696
South Dakota	11	–	4	.733	14	–	11	.560
North Dakota State	11	–	5	.688	15	–	12	.556
Oral Roberts †	10	–	5	.667	18	–	11	.621
North Dakota	8	–	8	.500	9	–	17	.346
Kansas City	7	–	7	.500	11	–	13	.458
Western Illinois	5	–	9	.357	7	–	15	.318
Omaha	3	–	11	.214	5	–	20	.200
Denver	1	–	13	.071	2	–	19	.095
† 2021 Summit League Tournament winner

The 2020–21 Oral Roberts Golden Eagles men's basketball team represented Oral Roberts University in the 2020–21 NCAA Division I men's basketball season. The Golden Eagles, led by fourth-year head coach Paul Mills, played their home games at the Mabee Center in Tulsa, Oklahoma, as members of the Summit League. They finished the season 18–11, 10–5 in Summit League Play to finish in 4th place. They defeated North Dakota, South Dakota State, and North Dakota State to be champions of the Summit League tournament. They received the conference’s automatic bid to the NCAA tournament where they upset Ohio State and Florida to advance to the Sweet Sixteen where they lost to Arkansas.

== Previous season ==
The Golden Eagles finished the 2019–20 season 17–14, 9–7 in Summit League play to finish in a tie for fourth place. They defeated Omaha in the quarterfinals of the Summit League tournament, before losing in the semifinals to North Dakota State.

== Roster ==
2020–21 Oral Roberts Golden Eagles men's basketball team
Players
Coaches

Pos.	#	Name	Height	Weight	Year	Previous school	Hometown
F	0	Kevin Obanor	6 ft 8 in (2.03 m)	225 lb (102 kg)	RS Jr	Mount Zion Christian Academy	Houston, Texas
F/C	1	Elijah Lufile	6 ft 8 in (2.03 m)	275 lb (125 kg)	RS Jr	Midland College	Milton, Ontario, Canada
G	2	Kareem Thompson	6 ft 6 in (1.98 m)	190 lb (86 kg)	So	East Central Community College	Florence, Alabama
G	3	Max Abmas	6 ft 1 in (1.85 m)	165 lb (75 kg)	So	Jesuit Dallas	Rockwall, Texas
G	4	Jamie Bergens	6 ft 2 in (1.88 m)	185 lb (84 kg)	Fr	West Nottingham Academy	Almere, Netherlands
G	5	D'Mauria Jones	6 ft 3 in (1.91 m)	220 lb (100 kg)	RS Sr	Antelope Valley College	Los Angeles, California
G	10	RJ Glasper	6 ft 0 in (1.83 m)	180 lb (82 kg)	RS Sr	Arkansas Tech	Forrest City, Arkansas
G	11	Carlos Jürgens	6 ft 5 in (1.96 m)	195 lb (88 kg)	RS So	Tartu Art Gymnasium	Tartu, Estonia
G	12	Justin Lovvorn	6 ft 3 in (1.91 m)	170 lb (77 kg)	RS Sr	Hardin–Simmons	Dallas, Texas
C	13	Nate Clover III	6 ft 8 in (2.03 m)	255 lb (116 kg)	Fr	Port Arthur Memorial High School	Port Arthur, Texas
F	14	DeShang Weaver	6 ft 8 in (2.03 m)	200 lb (91 kg)	RS So	Cypress Falls High School	Houston, Texas
F	22	Francis Lācis	6 ft 7 in (2.01 m)	215 lb (98 kg)	Jr	Riga Centre Language School	Riga, Latvia
G	23	Sheldon Stevens	6 ft 3 in (1.91 m)	160 lb (73 kg)	Jr	Southern Arkansas Tech	Grandview, Missouri
G	30	Jonathan Alexandre	6 ft 6 in (1.98 m)	190 lb (86 kg)	Fr	Legacy Christian Academy	Pétion-Ville, Haiti
F	45	Ismael Plet	6 ft 7 in (2.01 m)	220 lb (100 kg)	Fr	Virginia Episcopal School	Amsterdam, Netherlands

Head coach

- Paul Mills (Texas A&M)

Assistant coach(es)

- Solomon Bozeman (Little Rock)
- Russell Springmann (Salisbury)
- Sam Patterson (Baylor)

Legend

- (C) Team captain
- (S) Suspended
- (I) Ineligible
- (W) Walk-on
- Injured
- Current redshirt

Roster
Last update: December 8, 2020

== Schedule and results ==
Date time, TV	Rank^{#}	Opponent^{#}	Result	Record	Site (attendance) city, state
Non-conference regular season
November 25, 2020*; 6:00 pm, SECN+		at Missouri	L 64–91	0–1	Mizzou Arena; Columbia, MO
November 28, 2020*; 7:00 pm, ORUSN		Rogers State	W 93–63	1–1	Mabee Center (1,570); Tulsa, OK
December 2, 2020*; 6:00 pm, ESPN+		at Wichita State	L 80–85	1–2	Charles Koch Arena (100); Wichita, KS
December 5, 2020*; 7:00 pm, ORUSN		Southwestern Christian	Postponed to December 12 due to COVID-19 issues		Mabee Center; Tulsa, OK
December 8, 2020*; 7:00 pm, ESPN+/ORUSN		at Oklahoma State	L 78–83	1–3	Gallagher-Iba Arena (3,350); Stillwater, OK
December 12, 2020*; 2:00 pm, ORUSN		Tulsa; PSO Mayor's Cup	Canceled due to COVID-19 issues at Tulsa		Mabee Center; Tulsa, OK
December 12, 2020*; 2:00 pm		Southwestern Christian	W 111–58	2–3	Mabee Center (1,183); Tulsa, OK
December 15, 2020*; 7:00 pm, ORUSN		Bacone	W 96–65	3–3	Mabee Center (1,308); Tulsa, OK
December 16, 2020*; 7:00 pm, FSOK+		at Oklahoma	L 65–79	3–4	Lloyd Noble Center (2,000); Norman, OK
December 19, 2020*; 2:00 pm, ORUSN		UT Arlington	Canceled by agreement		Mabee Center; Tulsa, OK
December 20, 2020*; 1:00 pm, SECN		at Arkansas	L 76–87	3–5	Bud Walton Arena (4,201); Fayetteville, AR
Summit League regular season
January 2, 2021; 7:00 pm		at Omaha	W 95–83	4–5 (1–0)	Baxter Arena (547); Omaha, NE
January 3, 2021; 7:00 pm		at Omaha	W 86–75	5–5 (2–0)	Baxter Arena (361); Omaha, NE
January 8, 2021; 7:30 pm, ORUSN		North Dakota	L 71–72	5–6 (2–1)	Mabee Center (1,370); Tulsa, OK
January 9, 2021; 7:30 pm, ORUSN		North Dakota	W 74–57	6–6 (3–1)	Mabee Center (1,447); Tulsa, OK
January 15, 2021; 1:00 pm		at Denver	W 88–84	7–6 (4–1)	Hamilton Gymnasium; Denver, CO
January 16, 2021; 1:00 pm		at Denver	W 91–82	8–6 (5–1)	Hamilton Gymnasium; Denver, CO
January 23, 2021; 7:00 pm, ORUSN		Kansas City	W 60–58	9–6 (6–1)	Mabee Center (1,790); Tulsa, OK
January 24, 2021; 7:00 pm, ORUSN		Kansas City	L 76–81	9–7 (6–2)	Mabee Center (1,584); Tulsa, OK
February 5, 2021; 7:30 pm		at North Dakota State	L 54–61	9–8 (6–3)	Scheels Center; Fargo, ND
February 6, 2021; 7:30 pm		at North Dakota State	W 80–74	10–8 (7–3)	Scheels Center; Fargo, ND
February 13, 2021; 7:00 pm, ORUSN		South Dakota State	W 103–86	11–8 (8–3)	Mabee Center (1,594); Tulsa, OK
February 14, 2021; 7:00 pm, ORUSN		South Dakota State	L 80–95	11–9 (8–4)	Mabee Center (1,320); Tulsa, OK
February 20, 2021; 4:00 pm		at South Dakota	L 84–86	11–10 (8–5)	Sanford Coyote Sports Center (1,007); Vermillion, SD
February 21, 2021; 3:00 pm		at South Dakota	canceled due to COVID-19 issues		Sanford Coyote Sports Center; Vermillion, SD
February 27, 2021; 7:00 pm, ORUSN		Western Illinois	W 85–81	12–10 (9–5)	Mabee Center; Tulsa, OK
February 28, 2021; 7:00 pm, ORUSN		Western Illinois	W 95–59	13–10 (10–5)	Mabee Center; Tulsa, OK
Summit League tournament
March 7, 2021; 5:45 pm, MidcoSN/ESPN+	(4)	vs. (5) North Dakota; Quarterfinals	W 76–65	14–10	Sanford Pentagon (200); Sioux Falls, SD
March 8, 2021; 5:45 pm, MidcoSN/ESPN+	(4)	vs. (1) South Dakota State; Semifinals	W 90–88	15–10	Sanford Pentagon (200); Sioux Falls, SD
March 9, 2021; 8:00 pm, ESPN2	(4)	vs. (3) North Dakota State; Championship	W 75–72	16–10	Sanford Pentagon; Sioux Falls, SD
NCAA tournament
March 19, 2021; 2:00 pm, CBS	(15 S)	vs. (2 S) No. 7 Ohio State; First Round	W 75–72 ^{OT}	17–10	Mackey Arena; West Lafayette, IN
March 21, 2021; 6:45 pm, truTV	(15 S)	vs. (7 S) Florida; Second Round	W 81–78	18–10	Indiana Farmers Coliseum (979); Indianapolis, IN
March 27, 2021; 6:25 pm, TBS	(15 S)	vs. (3 S) No. 10 Arkansas; Sweet Sixteen	L 70–72	18–11	Bankers Life Fieldhouse; Indianapolis, IN
*Non-conference game. ^{#}Rankings from AP Poll. (#) Tournament seedings in parentheses. All times are in Central.
