= 2020–21 Summit League men's basketball season =

- League: NCAA Division I
- Sport: Basketball
- Teams: 9

Regular season

Tournament

Summit League men's basketball seasons
- 2019–20 2021–22

2020–21 Summit League men's basketball standings
	Conf.				Overall
Team	W		L	PCT	W		L	PCT
South Dakota State	9	–	3	.750	16	–	7	.696
South Dakota	11	–	4	.733	14	–	11	.560
North Dakota State	11	–	5	.688	15	–	12	.556
Oral Roberts †	10	–	5	.667	18	–	11	.621
North Dakota	8	–	8	.500	9	–	17	.346
Kansas City	7	–	7	.500	11	–	13	.458
Western Illinois	5	–	9	.357	7	–	15	.318
Omaha	3	–	11	.214	5	–	20	.200
Denver	1	–	13	.071	2	–	19	.095
† 2021 Summit League Tournament winner

The 2020–21 Summit League men's basketball season began with practices in October 2020, followed by the start of the 2020–21 NCAA Division I men's basketball season in November. Conference play began in January 2021 and will conclude in March 2021.

== Membership changes ==
The conference both gained and lost a member after the 2019–20 season. Purdue Fort Wayne left for the Horizon League and was replaced by Kansas City, which returned to the Summit after a seven-year absence spent in the Western Athletic Conference.

== Preseason awards ==
Preseason awards were announced by the league office on October 26, 2020.

=== Preseason men's basketball coaches poll ===
Rank	Team
1.	South Dakota State (33)- 608
2.	Oral Roberts- 504
3.	North Dakota State (3)- 466
4.	Omaha- 379
5.	South Dakota- 354
6.	North Dakota- 301
7.	Kansas City- 248
8.	Denver- 203
9.	Western Illinois- 167
(first place votes)

=== Preseason All-Summit League teams ===
Honor	Recipient
Preseason Player of the Year	Douglas Wilson, South Dakota State
Preseason All-Summit League First Team	Noah Friedel, South Dakota State
Preseason All-Summit League First Team	Kevin Obanor, Oral Roberts
Preseason All-Summit League First Team	Matt Pile, Omaha
Preseason All-Summit League First Team	Filip Rebraca, North Dakota
Preseason All-Summit League First Team	Stanley Umude, South Dakota
Preseason All-Summit League First Team	Douglas Wilson, South Dakota State
Preseason All-Summit League Second Team	Max Abmas, Oral Roberts
Preseason All-Summit League Second Team	Matt Dentlinger, South Dakota State
Preseason All-Summit League Second Team	Rocky Kreuser, North Dakota State
Preseason All-Summit League Second Team	Marlon Ruffin, Omaha
Preseason All-Summit League Second Team	Jase Townsend, Denver

== Conference matrix ==
	Denver	Kansas City	North Dakota	North Dakota State	Omaha	Oral Roberts	South Dakota	South Dakota State	Western Illinois
vs. Denver	–	2−0	1−1	2−0	2−0	2−0	2−0	0−0	2−0
vs. Kansas City	0–2	–	1−1	1−1	0−2	1−1	2−0	2−0	0−0
vs. North Dakota	1−1	1−1	–	1−1	1−1	1−1	0−2	2−0	1−1
vs. North Dakota State	0−2	1−1	1−1	–	0−2	1−1	1−1	1−1	0−2
vs. Omaha	0−2	2−0	1−1	2−0	–	2−0	2−0	0−0	2−0
vs. Oral Roberts	0−2	1−1	1−1	1−1	0−2	–	1−0	1−1	0−2
vs. South Dakota	0−2	0−2	2−0	1−1	0−2	0−1	–	1−1	0−2
vs. South Dakota State	0−0	0−2	0−2	1−1	0−0	1−1	1−1	–	0−2
vs. Western Illinois	0−2	0−0	1−1	2−0	0−2	2−0	2−0	2−0	–
Total	1−13	7−7	8−8	11−5	3−11	10−5	11−4	9−3	5−9

== All-Summit League awards ==
=== Summit League men's basketball weekly awards ===
Week	Player(s) of the Week	School
Nov 30	Marlon Ruffin	Omaha
Dec 7	Baylor Scheierman	South Dakota State
Dec 14	Stanley Umude (1)	South Dakota
Dec 21	Kevin Obanor (1)	Oral Roberts
Dec 28	Rocky Kreuser (1)	North Dakota State
Jan 4	Kevin Obanor (2)	Oral Roberts
Jan 11	Rocky Kreuser (2)	North Dakota State
Jan 18	Jase Townsend	Denver
Jan 25	Brandon McKissic	Kansas City
Feb 1	Stanley Umude (2)	South Dakota
Feb 8	Kevin Obanor (3)	Oral Roberts
Feb 15	Max Abmas (1)	Oral Roberts
Feb 22	A.J. Plitzuweit	South Dakota
Mar 1	Max Abmas (2)	Oral Roberts
