= 2020–21 Kansas City Roos men's basketball team =

American college basketball season

2020–21 Kansas City Roos men's basketball
- Conference: The Summit League
- Record: 11–13 (7–7 Summit)
- Head coach: Billy Donlon (2nd season)
- Assistant coaches: Lucas McKay (2nd season); Steve Payne (2nd season); Rodney Perry (2nd season)
- Home arena: Swinney Recreation Center

2020–21 Summit League men's basketball standings
	Conf.				Overall
Team	W		L	PCT	W		L	PCT
South Dakota State	9	–	3	.750	16	–	7	.696
South Dakota	11	–	4	.733	14	–	11	.560
North Dakota State	11	–	5	.688	15	–	12	.556
Oral Roberts †	10	–	5	.667	18	–	11	.621
North Dakota	8	–	8	.500	9	–	17	.346
Kansas City	7	–	7	.500	11	–	13	.458
Western Illinois	5	–	9	.357	7	–	15	.318
Omaha	3	–	11	.214	5	–	20	.200
Denver	1	–	13	.071	2	–	19	.095
† 2021 Summit League Tournament winner

The 2020–21 Kansas City Roos men's basketball team represented the University of Missouri–Kansas City during the 2020–21 NCAA Division I men's basketball season. The Roos, led by second-year head coach Billy Donlon, played their home games on-campus at Swinney Recreation Center in Kansas City, Missouri as a returning member of The Summit League (Summit).

The Roos finished the season 11–13, 7–7 in Summit play to finish in a tie for fifth place. They were defeated by North Dakota State University in the Summit tournament quarterfinal round.

== Previous season ==
The Kangaroos finished the 2019–20 season with a record of 16–14 overall, 8–7 in the Western Athletic Conference (WAC) to finish in fourth place.

== Roster ==
2020–21 Kansas City Roos men's basketball team
Players
Coaches

Pos.	#	Name	Height	Weight	Year	Previous school	Hometown
F	14	Arkel Lamar	6 ft 5 in (1.96 m)	235 lb (107 kg)	Sr	UMBC; St. Thomas More School/ St. Thomas Aquinas HS	Bridgeport, CT
G	3	Brandon McKissic	6 ft 3 in (1.91 m)	195 lb (88 kg)	Sr	St. Louis University HS	Ferguson, MO
G	33	Marvin Nesbitt, Jr.	6 ft 4 in (1.93 m)	180 lb (82 kg)	Sr	Butler College Preparatory HS	Chicago, IL
G	0	Zion Williams	6 ft 4 in (1.93 m)	193 lb (88 kg)	Sr	Wallace State CC; Saint Mark's HS	Maybrook, NY
F	12	Jonathan Bolden	6 ft 7 in (2.01 m)	225 lb (102 kg)	Jr	Sparkman HS	Harvest, AL
G	14	Kyle Brown	6 ft 1 in (1.85 m)	190 lb (86 kg)	Jr	Northwest College; Charlotte Basketball Academy	Harlem, NY
G	11	Franck Kamgain	6 ft 2 in (1.88 m)	195 lb (88 kg)	Jr	Wheeling Jesuit; DME Academy/ Center HS	Kansas City, MO
F	20	Josiah Allick	6 ft 7 in (2.01 m)	215 lb (98 kg)	So	Lincoln North Star HS	Lincoln, NE
G	2	Demarius Pitts	6 ft 4 in (1.93 m)	180 lb (82 kg)	So	Virginia Union; Springfield Commonwealth Academy/ Frederick Douglass HS	Clinton, MD
F	10	Hidde Roessink	6 ft 10 in (2.08 m)	220 lb (100 kg)	So	Oklahoma State; Rodenborch-College HS	Arnhem, Netherlands
G	4	Jacob Johnson	6 ft 5 in (1.96 m)	180 lb (82 kg)	RS Fr	Champlin Park HS	Brooklyn Park, MN
G	21	Sam Martin	6 ft 0 in (1.83 m)	185 lb (84 kg)	RS Fr	Burleson HS	Houston, TX
C	30	Brayden Mitchell	6 ft 10 in (2.08 m)	200 lb (91 kg)	RS Fr	Wellston HS	Wellston, OK
F	35	Caden Boser	6 ft 8 in (2.03 m)	200 lb (91 kg)	Fr	Memorial HS	Eau Claire, WI
G	5	Tyre Boykin	6 ft 1 in (1.85 m)	175 lb (79 kg)	Fr	West Bladen HS	White Oak, NC
F	40	Devon House	6 ft 7 in (2.01 m)	280 lb (127 kg)	Fr	Newman Central Catholic HS	Sterling, IL
G	32	Kaimen Lennox	6 ft 2 in (1.88 m)	165 lb (75 kg)	Fr	Truman HS	Independence, MO
G	15	Paxton Payne	6 ft 2 in (1.88 m)	185 lb (84 kg)	Fr	Smithville HS	Kansas City, MO
G	13	D'Anthony Pennington (redshirt)	6 ft 2 in (1.88 m)	160 lb (73 kg)	Fr	North Kansas City HS	Kansas City, MO

Head coach

- Billy Donlon (UNC Wilmington)

Assistant coach(es)

- Lucas McKay (UNC Wilmington)
- Steve Payne (Union Commonwealth)
- Rodney Perry (Missouri State)

Legend

- (C) Team captain
- (S) Suspended
- (I) Ineligible
- (W) Walk-on
- (5Y) Fifth-year Senior
- Injured
- Current redshirt

Roster
Last update: November 3, 2024

== Schedule & Results ==
Date time, TV	Rank^{#}	Opponent^{#}	Result	Record	High points	High rebounds	High assists	Site (attendance) city, state
Non–League Regular Season
November 25, 2020*; 3:00 PM		Culver–Stockton	W 105–35	1–0	21 – Allick	7 – Nesbitt, Jr.	5 – Williams, Johnson	Swinney Recreation Center (1); Kansas City, MO
November 27, 2020*; 4:00 PM		at Avila; Negro Leagues Baseball Museum; Tipoff Classic [Semifinal]	Revised (COVID–19 pandemic)					Mabee Fieldhouse; Kansas City, MO
November 27, 2020*; 4:00 PM		vs. Greenville; Negro Leagues Baseball Museum; Tipoff Classic [Semifinal]	W 138–97	2–0	29 – Allick	11 – Nesbitt, Jr.	7 – Nesbitt, Jr., Martin	Mabee Fieldhouse (203); Kansas City, MO
November 28, 2020*; 4:00 PM		vs. Southeast Missouri State; Negro Leagues Baseball Museum; Tipoff Classic [Final]	L 66–71	2–1	16 – McKissic	8 – Nesbitt, Jr.	5 – Williams	Mabee Fieldhouse (175); Kansas City, MO
November 30, 2020*; 7:00 PM, ESPNU		at Kansas State	L 58–62	2–2	24 – McKissic	5 – Nesbitt, Jr. Williams	3 – McKissic, Nesbitt, Jr. Williams	Fred Bramlage Coliseum; Manhattan, KS
December 5, 2020*; 7:00 PM		South Dakota	Canceled (COVID–19 pandemic)					Swinney Recreation Center; Kansas City, MO
December 10, 2020*; 7:00 PM, FS1		at Minnesota	L 61–90	2–3	10 – McKissic, Pitts	7 – McKissic, Allick	5 – McKissic	Williams Arena; Minneapolis, MN
December 12, 2020*; 11:00 AM		at Toledo	L 57–64	2–4	21 – McKissic	5 – Williams	4 – Williams	John F. Savage Arena; Toledo, OH
December 15, 2020*; 6:00 PM		Spurgeon	Canceled (COVID–19 pandemic)					Swinney Recreation Center; Kansas City, MO
December 16, 2020*; 6:00 PM		Spurgeon	Canceled (COVID–19 pandemic)					Swinney Recreation Center; Kansas City, MO
December 19, 2020*; 12:00 PM		Kansas Christian; Doubleheader (Game 1)	W 98–42	3–4	24 – Allick	12 – Johnson	11 – Martin	Swinney Recreation Center; Kansas City, MO
December 19, 2020*; 5:00 PM		Kansas Christian; Doubleheader (Game 2)	W 95–36	4–4	20 – Allick	13 – Allick	7 – Lennox	Swinney Recreation Center; Kansas City, MO
December 23, 2020*; 7:00 PM, FSMW		at Saint Louis	L 46–62	4–5	18 – McKissic	9 – Allick	5 – McKissic	Chaifetz Arena; St. Louis, MO
League Regular Season
January 2, 2021; 3:30 PM		at North Dakota	L 45–52	4–6 (0–1)	14 – Allick	11 – Allick	3 – McKissic	Betty Engelstad Sioux Center (600); Grand Forks, ND
January 3, 2021; 3:30 PM, ESPN3		at North Dakota	W 75–53	5–6 (1–1)	23 – Allick	8 – McKissic	5 – Williams	Betty Engelstad Sioux Center (464); Grand Forks, ND
January 8, 2021; 7:00 PM		South Dakota	L 64–66	5–7 (1–2)	19 – McKissic	12 – Nesbitt, Jr.	5 – Williams	Swinney Recreation Center; Kansas City, MO
January 9, 2021; 7:00 PM		South Dakota	L 62–68	5–8 (1–3)	19 – Allick	10 – Allick	3 – Williams	Swinney Recreation Center; Kansas City, MO
January 15, 2021; 7:00 PM		at Western Illinois	Canceled (COVID–19 pandemic)					Western Hall; Macomb, IL
January 16, 2021; 7:00 PM		at Western Illinois	Canceled (COVID–19 pandemic)					Western Hall; Macomb, IL
January 23, 2021; 7:00 PM		at Oral Roberts	L 58–60	5–9 (1–4)	20 – McKissic	10 – Williams	3 – McKissic, Kamgain	Mabee Center (1,790); Tulsa, OK
January 24, 2021; 7:00 PM		at Oral Roberts	W 81–76	6–9 (2–4)	24 – McKissic	5 – Lamar, Williams, Allick	4 – Kamgain	Mabee Center (1,584); Tulsa, OK
January 29, 2021; 7:00 PM		North Dakota State	L 67–71	6–10 (2–5)	19 – Lamar	7 – Lamar, Williams	7 – Kamgain	Swinney Recreation Center; Kansas City, MO
January 30, 2021; 7:00 PM		North Dakota State	W 49–47	7–10 (3–5)	12 – Williams	9 – Lamar	6 – Kamgain	Swinney Recreation Center; Kansas City, MO
February 12, 2021; 7:00 PM		Omaha	W 62–52	8–10 (4–5)	29 – McKissic	7 – Williams	5 – McKissic	Swinney Recreation Center; Kansas City, MO
February 13, 2021; 7:00 PM		Omaha	W 55–47	9–10 (5–5)	21 – Allick	11 – Allick	5 – Allick	Swinney Recreation Center; Kansas City, MO
February 19, 2021; 7:00 PM		Denver	W 68–57	10–10 (6–5)	20 – Nesbitt, Jr.	11 – Williams	6 – Kamgain	Swinney Recreation Center; Kansas City, MO
February 20, 2021; 7:00 PM		Denver	W 80–69	11–10 (7–5)	23 – Kamgain	7 – Nesbitt, Jr. Williams, Pitts	8 – McKissic	Swinney Recreation Center; Kansas City, MO
February 26, 2021; 7:30 PM		at South Dakota State	L 49–67	11–11 (7–6)	17 – McKissic	4 – Nesbitt, Jr. Boser	2 – Williams, Kamgain	Frost Arena (798); Brookings, SD
February 27, 2021; 7:30 PM		at South Dakota State	L 77–89	11–12 (7–7)	17 – Allick	3 – Allick, Pitts	5 – Pitts	Frost Arena (768); Brookings, SD
League Tournament
March 7, 2021*; 8:45 PM, MidCoSN/ESPN+	(6)	vs. (3) North Dakota State [Quarterfinal]	L 65–69	11–13	23 – Allick	10 – Allick	4 – Williams	Sanford Pentagon (200); Sioux Falls, SD
*Non-conference game. ^{#}Rankings from AP Poll. (#) Tournament seedings in parentheses. All times are in Central Standard Time (CST).
