= Dakota Showcase =

College basketball event held in Sioux Falls, South Dakota

The CU Mortgage Dakota Showcase was a college basketball event held in Sioux Falls, South Dakota at the Sanford Pentagon. It was a non-conference showcase that featured four Summit League men's basketball teams: North Dakota, North Dakota State, South Dakota State, and South Dakota. It was formed during the 2020–21 season as a way to add games to each team's schedule which were all majorly affected by the COVID-19 pandemic. No fans were allowed at the event and all of the teams followed COVID-19 protocols.

== Teams ==
Team	Head coach	2020–21 record	Classic record
North Dakota	Paul Sather	9–17	1–2
North Dakota State	David Richman	15–12	2–1
South Dakota	Todd Lee	14–11	1–2
South Dakota State	Eric Henderson	16–7	2–1

== Game results ==
December 10, 2020

Winning team	Score	Losing team
North Dakota	75–71	South Dakota
South Dakota State	77–75	North Dakota State

December 11, 2020

Winning team	Score	Losing team
South Dakota State	74–62	North Dakota
North Dakota State	74–67	South Dakota

December 12, 2020

Winning team	Score	Losing team
North Dakota State	53–52	North Dakota
South Dakota	91–78	South Dakota State
