= Max Abmas =

American basketball player (born 2001)

- Abmas with Petkim Spor in 2026

No. 3 – Petkim Spor
- Position: Point guard
- League: BSL

Personal information
- Born: April 2, 2001 (age 25) Rockwall, Texas, U. S.
- Listed height: 5 ft 11 in (1.80 m)
- Listed weight: 162 lb (73 kg)

Career information
- High school: Jesuit Dallas (Dallas, Texas)
- College: Oral Roberts (2019–2023); Texas (2023–2024)
- NBA draft: 2024: undrafted
- Playing career: 2024–present

Career history
- 2024–2026: Salt Lake City Stars
- 2026: Mets de Guaynabo
- 2026–present: Petkim Spor

Career highlights
- NBA G League Sportsmanship Award (2026); NBA G League Winter Showcase Championship MVP (2025); Lou Henson Award (2021); Third-team All-American – NABC (2023); Academic All-American of the Year (2024); First-team Academic All-American (2024); 3× AP Honorable mention All-American (2021–2023); NCAA scoring champion (2021); 2× Summit League Player of the Year (2021, 2023); 3× First-team All-Summit League (2021–2023); Second-team All-Big 12 (2024); Big 12 All-Newcomer team (2024); Summit League All-Newcomer Team (2020); 2× Summit League tournament MVP (2021, 2023)
- Stats at NBA.com
- Stats at Basketball Reference

Maxwell Abmas (/ˈeɪsməs/ AYSS-məss; born April 2, 2001) is an American professional basketball player for Petkim Spor of the Basketbol Süper Ligi (BSL). He played college basketball for the Texas Longhorns and Oral Roberts Golden Eagles. He is one of 12 players in NCAA Division I college men's basketball history to score more than 3,000 career points.

== Early life ==
Abmas attended Jesuit College Preparatory School of Dallas. He joined the varsity team in his sophomore season. As a senior, he averaged 19.1 points and 3.7 assists per game. He was named District 9-6A co-MVP. Abmas competed for 3-D Sports on the Amateur Athletic Union circuit. He was lightly recruited and committed to playing college basketball for Oral Roberts over offers from Army, Navy, Air Force and Marist.

== College career ==
=== Oral Roberts (2019–2023) ===
As a freshman at Oral Roberts, he was a regular starter and averaged 14.4 points, earning Summit League All-Newcomer Team honors. On December 8, 2020, he recorded 36 points, nine assists and six rebounds in an 83–78 loss to Oklahoma State. On February 13, 2021, Abmas scored a career-high 42 points in a 103–86 win over South Dakota State. Two days later, he was named Lou Henson National Mid-Major Player of the Week. On February 27, Abmas scored 41 points in an 85–81 victory over Western Illinois.

At the close of the 2020–21 season, Abmas was named the Summit League Player of the Year and first-team all-conference. He helped his team win the Summit League tournament, where he was named MVP, and earn an NCAA tournament berth. In the first round of the NCAA tournament, he led 15th-seeded Oral Roberts to a 75–72 upset win over second-seeded Ohio State in overtime, scoring 29 points. In the second round, Abmas scored 26 points to help upset seventh-seeded Florida, 81–78. In the Sweet 16, Abmas scored 25 points in a 72–70 loss to Arkansas. With this performance, Abmas became the first player to score at least 25 points in each of the first three rounds at a single tournament since Stephen Curry during the 2008 NCAA tournament. His play at the tournament has led many to draw comparisons between him and both Curry and Jimmer Fredette. On May 9, 2021, he declared for the 2021 NBA draft while maintaining his college eligibility. He withdrew from the draft on the day of the deadline.

As a junior, Abmas was named to the First Team All-Summit League. After earning second team All-Big 12 recognition, he earned Men's Basketball Academic All-America of the Year recognition.

=== Texas (2023–2024) ===
On May 5, 2023, Abmas signed an Athletic Scholarship Agreement to play basketball at the University of Texas.

In February 2024, Abmas was one of 30 players selected to the 2024 Jersey Mike's Naismith Trophy Men's College Player of the Year Midseason Team.

On February 5, 2024, Abmas was named the Big 12 conference Newcomer of the Week for the third time.

In April 2024, Abmas was named College Sports Communicators Academic All-America Division I Men's Basketball Team Member of the Year. He was also one of five players named to the CSC Academic All-America first-team. Abmas was the first player in program history to receive the Academic All-American of the Year honor and just the third student-athlete at the school to be recognized as the Academic All-American of the Year in their respective sport. He played and started in all 34 games that season and led the team in scoring, assists and minutes. He tied the single-season record for most three pointers made in Big 12 conference play, sharing the mark with Kevin Durant and Daniel Gibson.

In April 2024, Abmas was selected for the Portsmouth Invitational Tournament. At Portsmouth, he played in 3 games and averaged 8.7 points, 3 rebounds, and 2.7 assists.

== Professional career ==
=== Salt Lake City Stars (2024–2026) ===
After going undrafted in the 2024 NBA draft, Abmas joined the Utah Jazz for the 2024 NBA Summer League and on September 16, 2024, he signed with the team. However, he was waived on October 8 and on October 28, he joined the Salt Lake City Stars.

=== Mets de Guaynabo (2026) ===
On April 6, 2026, Abmas signed with the Mets de Guaynabo of the Baloncesto Superior Nacional in Puerto Rico.

=== Petkim Spor (2026–present) ===
On July 21, 2026, he signed with Petkim Spor of the Basketbol Süper Ligi (BSL).

== Personal life ==
Abmas is the son of Troy and Erika Abmas. His father worked in cybersecurity and his mom was a respiratory therapist. His father played high school football in Shreveport, LA. Abmas has two siblings.

== Career statistics ==
Legend
GP	Games played	GS	Games started	MPG	Minutes per game
FG%	Field goal percentage	3P%	3-point field goal percentage	FT%	Free throw percentage
RPG	Rebounds per game	APG	Assists per game	SPG	Steals per game
BPG	Blocks per game	PPG	Points per game	**Bold**	Career high

=== Professional ===
Year	Team	GP	GS	MPG	FG%	3P%	FT%	RPG	APG	SPG	BPG	PPG
2024-25	Salt Lake City Stars	34	4	25.0	.411	.382	.809	3.4	4.1	0.8	0.1	13.6
2025-26	Salt Lake City Stars	36	26	30.6	.437	.379	.817	3.6	4.3	1.1	0.1	17.4
2026	Mets Guaynabo	10	9	30.8	.505	.400	.926	2.6	5.4	0.5	0.0	15.9

=== College ===
*	Led NCAA Division I

Year	Team	GP	GS	MPG	FG%	3P%	FT%	RPG	APG	SPG	BPG	PPG
2019–20	Oral Roberts	31	31	29.5	.411	.366	.830	2.2	1.4	1.0	**.2**	14.4
2020–21	Oral Roberts	28	28	**37.0**	**.477**	**.429**	.890	3.2	3.8	**1.5**	**.2**	**24.5***
2021–22	Oral Roberts	30	30	36.8	.422	.389	.850	3.4	3.7	1.0	.1	22.8
2022–23	Oral Roberts	**34**	**34**	36.1	.436	.373	**.919**	**4.4**	4.0	1.1	**.2**	21.9
2023–24	Texas	**34**	**34**	35.0	.425	.362	.900	3.1	**4.1**	0.9	.1	16.8
Career		157	157	34.8	.435	.383	.884	3.3	3.4	1.1	.2	19.9

== See also ==
- List of NCAA Division I men's basketball season scoring leaders
- List of NCAA Division I men's basketball career scoring leaders
- List of NCAA Division I men's basketball career 3-point scoring leaders
