= 2020–21 Omaha Mavericks men's basketball team =

American college basketball season

2020–21 Omaha Mavericks men's basketball
- Conference: Summit League
- Record: 5–20 (3–11 The Summit)
- Head coach: Derrin Hansen (16th season)
- Assistant coaches: Pat Eberhart; Tyler Erwin; Jake Koch
- Home arena: Baxter Arena

2020–21 Summit League men's basketball standings
	Conf.				Overall
Team	W		L	PCT	W		L	PCT
South Dakota State	9	–	3	.750	16	–	7	.696
South Dakota	11	–	4	.733	14	–	11	.560
North Dakota State	11	–	5	.688	15	–	12	.556
Oral Roberts †	10	–	5	.667	18	–	11	.621
North Dakota	8	–	8	.500	9	–	17	.346
Kansas City	7	–	7	.500	11	–	13	.458
Western Illinois	5	–	9	.357	7	–	15	.318
Omaha	3	–	11	.214	5	–	20	.200
Denver	1	–	13	.071	2	–	19	.095
† 2021 Summit League Tournament winner

The 2020–21 Omaha Mavericks men's basketball team represented the University of Nebraska Omaha in the 2020–21 NCAA Division I men's basketball season. The Mavericks, led by 16th-year head coach Derrin Hansen, played their home games at Baxter Arena in Omaha, Nebraska, as members of the Summit League.

== Previous season ==
The Mavericks finished the 2019–20 season 16–16, 9–7 in Summit League play to finish in a tie for fourth place. They lost in the quarterfinals of the Summit League tournament to Oral Roberts.

== Roster ==
2020–21 Omaha Mavericks men's basketball team
Players
Coaches

Pos.	#	Name	Height	Weight	Year	Previous school	Hometown
G	0	Sam'i Roe	6 ft 1 in (1.85 m)	180 lb (82 kg)	Jr	Independence Community College	Atlantic City, New Jersey
G	1	Nick Ferrarini	6 ft 5 in (1.96 m)	190 lb (86 kg)	Jr	Wayne State	Omaha, Nebraska
G/F	2	Darrius Hughes	6 ft 7 in (2.01 m)	230 lb (104 kg)	So	Rockhurst High School	Kansas City, Missouri
G	3	Kyle Luedtke	6 ft 5 in (1.96 m)	190 lb (86 kg)	So	Creighton Prep	Omaha, Nebraska
G	5	Zach Thornhill	6 ft 4 in (1.93 m)	185 lb (84 kg)	Jr	St. James Academy	Lenexa, Kansas
G	10	Ayo Akinwole	6 ft 0 in (1.83 m)	165 lb (75 kg)	Sr	Papillion-La Vista High School	Papillion, Nebraska
G	11	La'Mel Robinson	6 ft 0 in (1.83 m)	160 lb (73 kg)	RS Fr	Park Hill South High School	Riverside, Missouri
F	13	Wanjang Tut	6 ft 8 in (2.03 m)	205 lb (93 kg)	RS So	The Skill Factory Prep	Omaha, Nebraska
C	14	Dylan Brougham	6 ft 9 in (2.06 m)	195 lb (88 kg)	Fr	Park Hill South High School	Riverside, Missouri
G	15	Grant Frickenstein	6 ft 3 in (1.91 m)	170 lb (77 kg)	RS Fr	Archbishop Bergan High School	Fremont, Nebraska
G	20	Jadin Booth	6 ft 2 in (1.88 m)	175 lb (79 kg)	Fr	Westside High School	Omaha, Nebraska
F	21	Devin Evans	6 ft 9 in (2.06 m)	200 lb (91 kg)	So	Southwest Mississippi Community College	Conyers, Georgia
G	22	Marco Smith	6 ft 2 in (1.88 m)	175 lb (79 kg)	Jr	UMKC	Kansas City, Kansas
G/F	23	Marlon Ruffin	6 ft 5 in (1.96 m)	195 lb (88 kg)	Jr	Highland Community College	Madison, Wisconsin
C	24	Nathan Brusseau	6 ft 11 in (2.11 m)	225 lb (102 kg)	So	New Prague High School	New Prague, Minnesota
F	40	Matt Pile	6 ft 8 in (2.03 m)	240 lb (109 kg)	Sr	Eisenhower High School	Wichita, Kansas

Head coach

- Derrin Hansen (Nebraska Wesleyan)

Assistant coach(es)

- Pat Eberhart (Adams State)
- Tyler Erwin (Midland)
- Jake Koch (Northern Iowa)

Legend

- (C) Team captain
- (S) Suspended
- (I) Ineligible
- (W) Walk-on
- Injured
- Current redshirt

Roster
Last update: December 8, 2020

== Schedule and results ==
Date time, TV	Rank^{#}	Opponent^{#}	Result	Record	Site (attendance) city, state
Non-conference regular season
November 25, 2020*; 1:00 pm		vs. Austin Peay; Gulf Coast Showcase	L 66–72	0–1	Hertz Arena (50); Estero, FL
November 26, 2020*; 10:00 am		vs. Middle Tennessee; Gulf Coast Showcase	W 60–59	1–1	Hertz Arena (50); Estero, FL
November 28, 2020*; 10:00 am		vs. Abilene Christian; Gulf Coast Showcase	L 58–70	1–2	Hertz Arena (50); Estero, FL
December 1, 2020*; 4:00 pm, FS1		at No. 9 Creighton	L 67–94	1–3	CHI Health Center Omaha (251); Omaha, NE
December 3, 2020*; 7:00 pm, ESPN3		at Drake	L 66–87	1–4	Knapp Center (89); Des Moines, IA
December 5, 2020*; 2:00 pm, ESPN+		at SIU Edwardsville	W 65–63	2–4	First Community Arena; Edwardsville, IL
December 11, 2020*; 6:00 pm, ESPN2		at No. 5 Kansas	L 55-90	2-5	Allen Fieldhouse (2,500); Lawrence, KS
December 16, 2020*; 4:00 pm, P12N		at Colorado	L 49-91	2-6	CU Events Center (0); Boulder, CO
December 17, 2020*; 8:00 pm, MWN		at Wyoming	L 78-82	2-7	Arena-Auditorium (0); Laramie, WY
December 29, 2020*; 7:00 pm, Big 12 Now		at Kansas State	L 58–60	2–8	Bramlage Coliseum (519); Manhattan, KS
Summit League regular season
January 2, 2021; 7:00 pm		Oral Roberts	L 83–95	2–9 (0–1)	Baxter Arena (547); Omaha, NE
January 3, 2021; 7:00 pm		Oral Roberts	L 75–86	2–10 (0–2)	Baxter Arena (361); Omaha, NE
January 8, 2021; 7:30 pm, MidcoSN		at North Dakota State	L 69–71	2–11 (0–3)	Scheels Center (954); Fargo, ND
January 9, 2021; 7:30 pm, MidcoSN		at North Dakota State	L 66–80	2–12 (0–4)	Scheels Center (1,245); Fargo, ND
January 15, 2021; 7:00 pm		South Dakota State	Canceled due to COVID-19 issues		Baxter Arena; Omaha, NE
January 16, 2021; 7:00 pm		South Dakota State	Canceled due to COVID-19 issues		Baxter Arena; Omaha, NE
January 29, 2021; 8:00 pm, MidcoSN		at South Dakota	L 59–91	2–13 (0–5)	Sanford Coyote Sports Center (743); Vermillion, SD
January 30, 2021; 7:00 pm, MidcoSN		at South Dakota	L 93–97	2–14 (0–6)	Sanford Coyote Sports Center (619); Vermillion, SD
February 6, 2021; 8:00 pm		Western Illinois	L 77–85	2–15 (0–7)	Baxter Arena; Omaha, NE
February 7, 2021; 8:00 pm		Western Illinois	L 73–75	2–16 (0–8)	Baxter Arena; Omaha, NE
February 12, 2021; 7:00 pm		at Kansas City	L 52–62	2–17 (0–9)	Swinney Recreation Center; Kansas City, MO
February 13, 2021; 7:00 pm		at Kansas City	L 47–55	2–18 (0–10)	Swinney Recreation Center; Kansas City, MO
February 19, 2021; 7:00 pm		North Dakota	W 72–62	3–18 (1–10)	Baxter Arena; Omaha, NE
February 20, 2021; 7:00 pm		North Dakota	L 69–81	3–19 (1–11)	Baxter Arena; Omaha, NE
February 26, 2021; 2:00 pm		at Denver	W 80–76	4–19 (2–11)	Hamilton Gymnasium; Denver, DO
February 27, 2021; 7:00 pm		at Denver	W 80–76	5–19 (3–11)	Hamilton Gymnasium; Denver, CO
Summit League tournament
March 6, 2020; 5:45 pm, MidcoSN/ESPN+	(8)	vs. (1) South Dakota State; Quarterfinals	L 71–84	5–20	Sanford Pentagon; Sioux Falls, SD
*Non-conference game. ^{#}Rankings from AP Poll. (#) Tournament seedings in parentheses. All times are in Central.
