= Cal State Bakersfield Roadrunners men's basketball =

2026–27 Cal State Bakersfield Roadrunners men's basketball team
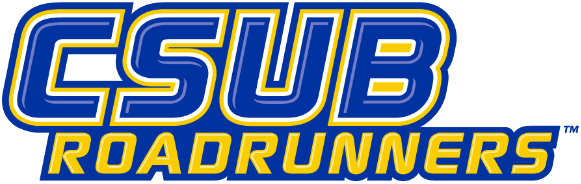
- University: California State University, Bakersfield
- Head coach: Todd Lee (1st season)
- Location: Bakersfield, California
- Arena: Icardo Center (capacity: 3,500)
- Conference: Big West Conference
- Nickname: Roadrunners
- Colors: Blue and gold

NCAA Division I tournament champions
- Division II: 1993, 1994, 1997
Other NCAA Division I tournament results
Runner-up	Division II: 1990
Final Four	Division II: 1982, 1983, 1990, 1991, 1992, 1993, 1994, 1997
Elite Eight	Division II: 1982, 1983, 1990, 1991, 1992, 1993, 1994, 1996, 1997
Appearances	Division II: 1973, 1976, 1982, 1983, 1984, 1988, 1989, 1990, 1991, 1992, 1993, 1994, 1995, 1996, 1997, 1998, 2001, 2002, 2003, 2004, 2006; Division I: 2016

Conference tournament champions
- 2016

Conference regular-season champions
- 2017

Uniforms
Home	Away	Alternate

The Cal State Bakersfield Roadrunners men's basketball represents California State University, Bakersfield in Bakersfield, California, United States. The team is currently led by head coach Todd Lee and competes in the Big West Conference.

The Roadrunners joined NCAA Division I in 2007. During their time in NCAA Division II they participated in 21 NCAA Division II Tournaments. They advanced to the final four eight times and are three time national champions (1993, 1994, 1997). They won the Western Athletic Conference Tournament in 2016 earning their first bid to the NCAA Division I men's basketball tournament.

== Postseason appearances ==
=== NCAA Division I Tournament results ===
The Roadrunners have appeared in the NCAA Division I Tournament one time. Their record is 0–1.

Year	Round	Opponent	Result
2016	First round	Oklahoma	L 68–82

=== NCAA Division II Tournament results ===
The Roadrunners have appeared in the NCAA Division II Tournament 21 times. Their combined record is 41–20. They are three time NCAA Division II national champions (1993, 1994, 1997).

Year	Round	Opponent	Result
1973	Regional semifinals Regional Finals	San Diego; UC Riverside	W 50–44; L 54–61
1976	Regional semifinals Regional Finals	UC Davis; Puget Sound	W 87–65; L 65–75
1982	Regional semifinals Regional Finals; Elite Eight; Final Four; National 3rd-place game	San Francisco State; Cal Poly SLO; North Dakota; UDC; Kentucky Wesleyan	W 58–50; W 58–55; W 67–65; L 71–76; L 66–77
1983	Regional semifinals Regional Finals; Elite Eight; Final Four	Humboldt State; Chapman; Southeast Missouri State; Wright State	W 72–48; W 78–66; W 75–70; L 50–57
1984	Regional semifinals Regional 3rd-place game	Kentucky Wesleyan; Bellarmine	L 85–96; L 71–81
1988	Regional semifinals Regional 3rd-place game	Alaska-Anchorage; Sacramento State	L 82–89 ^{OT} W 90–89
1989	Regional semifinals Regional Finals	Cal State Dominguez Hills; UC Riverside	W 64–61; L 60–63
1990	Regional semifinals Regional Finals; Elite Eight; Final Four; National Championship Game	Humboldt State; Central Missouri State; Bridgeport; Morehouse; Kentucky Wesleyan	W 76–58; W 68–64; W 87–72; W 85–60; L 79–93
1991	Regional semifinals Regional Finals; Elite Eight; Final Four	UC Riverside; Alaska-Anchorage; Southwest Baptist; Bridgeport	W 75–52; W 78–68; W 55–52; L 66–73 ^{OT}
1992	Regional semifinals Regional Finals; Elite Eight; Final Four	Chico State; UC Riverside; Jacksonville State; Virginia Union	W 99–78; W 72–70 ^{OT} W 89–59; L 66–69
1993	Regional semifinals Regional Finals; Elite Eight; Final Four; National Championship Game	Grand Canyon; Alaska-Anchorage; North Carolina Central; Wayne State; Troy State	W 98–68; W 78–69; W 86–80; W 61–57; W 85–72
1994	Regional semifinals Regional Finals; Elite Eight; Final Four; National Championship Game	Alaska-Anchorage; UC Riverside; Indiana (PA); Washburn; Southern Indiana	W 92–61; W 75–62; W 87–69; W 67–64; W 92–86
1995	Regional Quarterfinals	Cal State Los Angeles	L 66–70 ^{OT}
1996	Regional semifinals Regional Finals; Elite Eight	Grand Canyon; Seattle Pacific; Northern Kentucky	W 71–65; W 78–65; L 55–56
1997	Regional semifinals Regional Finals; Elite Eight; Final Four; National Championship Game	Grand Canyon; Montana State-Billings; Southern Connecticut State; Salem-Teikyo; Northern Kentucky	W 80–70; W 90–78; W 65–62; W 81–68; W 57–56
1998	Regional semifinals	Seattle Pacific	L 60–62
2001	Regional Quarterfinals; Regional semifinals	Humboldt State; Western Washington	W 99–88; L 86–95 ^{OT}
2002	Regional Quarterfinals; Regional semifinals	Montana State-Billings; Cal State San Bernardino	W 84–81; L 62–66
2003	Regional Quarterfinals; Regional semifinals	BYU-Hawaiʻi; Cal Poly Pomona	W 50–41; L 49–62
2004	Regional Quarterfinals	Alaska-Fairbanks	L 82–91
2006	Regional Quarterfinals; Regional semifinals	Somona State; Seattle Pacific	W 71–68; L 75–81

=== NIT results ===
The Roadrunners have appeared in one National Invitation Tournament (NIT). Their record is 3–1.

Year	Round	Opponent	Result
2017	First round Second Round; Quarterfinals; Semifinals	California; Colorado State; UT Arlington; Georgia Tech	W 73–66; W 81–63; W 80–76; L 61–76

=== CIT results ===
The Roadrunners have appeared twice in the CollegeInsider.com Postseason Tournament (CIT). Their combined record is 2–2.

Year	Round	Opponent	Result
2012	First round	Utah State	L 69–75
2019	First round Second Round; Quarterfinals	Cal State Fullerton; Southern Utah; Green Bay	W 66–58; W 70–67; L 65–80
