= 2020–21 North Dakota Fighting Hawks men's basketball team =

American college basketball season

2020–21 North Dakota Fighting Hawks men's basketball
- Conference: Summit League
- Record: 9–17 (8–8 The Summit)
- Head coach: Paul Sather (2nd season)
- Assistant coaches: Jamie Stevens; Zach Horstman; Dani Mihailovic
- Home arena: Betty Engelstad Sioux Center

2020–21 Summit League men's basketball standings
	Conf.				Overall
Team	W		L	PCT	W		L	PCT
South Dakota State	9	–	3	.750	16	–	7	.696
South Dakota	11	–	4	.733	14	–	11	.560
North Dakota State	11	–	5	.688	15	–	12	.556
Oral Roberts †	10	–	5	.667	18	–	11	.621
North Dakota	8	–	8	.500	9	–	17	.346
Kansas City	7	–	7	.500	11	–	13	.458
Western Illinois	5	–	9	.357	7	–	15	.318
Omaha	3	–	11	.214	5	–	20	.200
Denver	1	–	13	.071	2	–	19	.095
† 2021 Summit League Tournament winner

The 2020–21 North Dakota Fighting Hawks basketball team represented the University of North Dakota in the 2020–21 NCAA Division I men's basketball season. The Fighting Hawks were led by second-year head coach Paul Sather and played their home games at the Betty Engelstad Sioux Center in Grand Forks, North Dakota, as members of the Summit League.

== Previous season ==
Under first-year head coach Paul Sather, the Fighting Hawks finished the 2019–20 season with a record of 15–18 overall, 7–9 in Summit League play, to finish sixth place. It was a monumental year for the Fighting Hawks as they reached the championship game of the Summit League tournament for the first time before losing to rival North Dakota State. The Fighting Hawks also defeated Big Ten opponent Nebraska during the regular season by a score of 75–74.

== Roster ==
2020–21 North Dakota Fighting Hawks men's basketball team
Players
Coaches

Pos.	#	Name	Height	Weight	Year	Hometown
G	0	Caleb Nero	6 ft 2 in (1.88 m)	176 lb (80 kg)	So	Tulsa, OK
G/F	1	Seybian Sims	6 ft 7 in (2.01 m)	200 lb (91 kg)	Jr	Iowa City, IA
G	2	Carlos Jr. Ramsay	6 ft 5 in (1.96 m)	190 lb (86 kg)	Fr	Milwaukee, WI
F	3	Andrew Bergan	6 ft 8 in (2.03 m)	180 lb (82 kg)	Fr	Aberdeen, SD
G	4	Tyree Ihenacho	6 ft 4 in (1.93 m)	192 lb (87 kg)	Fr	Prior Lake, MN
G	10	Nate Shockey	6 ft 3 in (1.91 m)	193 lb (88 kg)	Fr	Elmhurst, IL
G	11	Bentiu Panoam	6 ft 2 in (1.88 m)	168 lb (76 kg)	Sr	Anchorage, AK
F	12	Filip Rebrača	6 ft 9 in (2.06 m)	222 lb (101 kg)	Jr	Sombor, Serbia
G	15	Brady Danielson	6 ft 4 in (1.93 m)	200 lb (91 kg)	So	York, NE
G	21	Ethan Igbanugo	6 ft 3 in (1.91 m)	191 lb (87 kg)	Jr	Lakeville, MN
F	32	Gertautas Urbonavicius	6 ft 7 in (2.01 m)	227 lb (103 kg)	So	Vilnius, Lithuania
G	34	De'Sean Allen-Eikens	6 ft 6 in (1.98 m)	219 lb (99 kg)	So	Williston, ND
F	35	Mitchell Sueker	6 ft 9 in (2.06 m)	220 lb (100 kg)	Jr	Marshall, MN

Head coach

- Paul Sather

Assistant coach(es)

- Jamie Stevens
- Zach Horstman
- Dani Mihailovic

Legend

- (C) Team captain
- (S) Suspended
- (I) Ineligible
- (W) Walk-on
- Injured
- Current redshirt

Roster
Last update: November 26, 2020

== Schedule and results ==
Date time, TV	Rank^{#}	Opponent^{#}	Result	Record	Site (attendance) city, state
Non-conference regular season
November 25, 2020*; 12:00 p.m.		at Miami (OH)	L 67–81	0–1	Millett Hall (No fans allowed); Oxford, OH
December 2, 2020*; 8:00 p.m.		at Dixie State	L 73–74	0–2	Burns Arena (475); St. George, UT
December 4, 2020*; 8:00 p.m.		at Minnesota	L 67–76	0–3	Williams Arena (No fans allowed); Minneapolis, MN
December 10, 2020*; 5:30 p.m.		vs. South Dakota; Dakota Showcase	W 75–71	1–3	Sanford Pentagon (No fans allowed); Sioux Falls, SD
December 11, 2020*; 5:30 p.m.		vs. South Dakota State; Dakota Showcase	L 62–74	1–4	Sanford Pentagon (No fans allowed); Sioux Falls, SD
December 12, 2020*; 5:30 p.m.		vs. North Dakota State; Dakota Showcase	L 52–53	1–5	Sanford Pentagon (No fans allowed); Sioux Falls, SD
December 17, 2020*; 1:00 p.m.		at Southern Illinois	L 64–85	1–6	Banterra Center (No fans allowed); Carbondale, IL
December 18, 2020*; 3:00 p.m.		at Southern Illinois	L 50–62	1–7	Banterra Center (No fans allowed); Carbondale, IL
December 22, 2020*; 6:00 p.m.		at Drake	L 55–88	1–8	Knapp Center (325); Des Moines, IA
Summit League regular season
January 2, 2021; 3:30 p.m., ESPN+		Kansas City	W 52–45	2–8 (1–0)	Betty Engelstad Sioux Center (600); Grand Forks, ND
January 3, 2021; 3:30 p.m., ESPN3		Kansas City	L 53–77	2–9 (1–1)	Betty Engelstad Sioux Center (464); Grand Forks, ND
January 8, 2021; 7:30 p.m., ORUSN		at Oral Roberts	W 72–71	3–9 (2–1)	Mabee Center (1370); Tulsa, OK
January 9, 2021; 7:30 p.m., ORUSN		at Oral Roberts	L 57–74	3–10 (2–2)	Mabee Center (1447); Tulsa OK
January 15, 2021; 7:30 p.m., MidcoSN		North Dakota State	L 45–62	3–11 (2–3)	Betty Engelstad Sioux Center (650); Grand Forks, ND
January 16, 2021; 7:30 p.m., MidcoSN		North Dakota State	W 82–78 ^{OT}	4–11 (3–3)	Betty Engelstad Sioux Center (650); Grand Forks, ND
January 22, 2021; 7:30 p.m., MidcoSN2		at South Dakota State	L 73–92	4–12 (3–4)	Frost Arena (787); Brookings, SD
January 23, 2021; 7:30 p.m.		at South Dakota State	L 74–85	4–13 (3–5)	Frost Arena (786); Brookings, SD
January 29, 2021; 7:30 p.m., MidcoSN2		Western Illinois	W 83–81	5–13 (4–5)	Betty Engelstad Sioux Center (558); Grand Forks, ND
January 30, 2021; 7:30 p.m., MidcoSN2		Western Illinois	L 87–99	5–14 (4–6)	Betty Engelstad Sioux Center (556); Grand Forks, ND
February 5, 2021; 2:00 p.m.		at Denver	W 85–82 ^{OT}	6–14 (5–6)	Hamilton Gymnasium (No fans allowed); Denver, CO
February 6, 2021; 2:00 p.m.		at Denver	L 81–85 ^{OT}	6–15 (5–7)	Hamilton Gymnasium (No fans allowed); Denver, CO
February 13, 2021; 2:30 p.m., MidcoSN		South Dakota	W 85–76	7–15 (6–7)	Betty Engelstad Sioux Center (650); Grand Forks, ND
February 14, 2021; 2:30 p.m., MidcoSN		South Dakota	W 85–81	8–15 (7–7)	Betty Engelstad Sioux Center (650); Grand Forks, ND
February 19, 2021; 7:00 p.m.		at Omaha	L 62–72	8–16 (7–8)	Baxter Arena (388); Omaha, NE
February 20, 2021; 7:00 p.m.		at Omaha	W 81–69	9–16 (8–8)	Baxter Arena (586); Omaha, NE
Summit League tournament
March 7, 2020; 5:45 p.m., MidcoSN/ESPN+	(5)	vs. (4) Oral Roberts; Quarterfinals	L 65–76	9–17	Sanford Pentagon; Sioux Falls, SD
*Non-conference game. ^{#}Rankings from AP poll. (#) Tournament seedings in parentheses. All times are in Central.
