= 2020–21 Western Illinois Leathernecks men's basketball team =

American college basketball season

2020–21 Western Illinois Leathernecks men's basketball
- Conference: Summit League
- Record: 7–15 (5–9 The Summit)
- Head coach: Rob Jeter (1st season)
- Associate head coach: Chad Boudreau
- Assistant coaches: Kyle Heikkinen; Nick Irvin
- Home arena: Western Hall

2020–21 Summit League men's basketball standings
	Conf.				Overall
Team	W		L	PCT	W		L	PCT
South Dakota State	9	–	3	.750	16	–	7	.696
South Dakota	11	–	4	.733	14	–	11	.560
North Dakota State	11	–	5	.688	15	–	12	.556
Oral Roberts †	10	–	5	.667	18	–	11	.621
North Dakota	8	–	8	.500	9	–	17	.346
Kansas City	7	–	7	.500	11	–	13	.458
Western Illinois	5	–	9	.357	7	–	15	.318
Omaha	3	–	11	.214	5	–	20	.200
Denver	1	–	13	.071	2	–	19	.095
† 2021 Summit League Tournament winner

The 2020–21 Western Illinois Leathernecks men's basketball team represented Western Illinois University in the 2020–21 NCAA Division I men's basketball season. The Leathernecks, led by first-year head coach Rob Jeter, played their home games at Western Hall in Macomb, Illinois, as members of the Summit League.

== Previous season ==
The Leathernecks finished the 2019–20 season 5–21, 2–14 in Summit League play to finish in last place. They failed to qualify for the Summit League tournament.

On March 3, 2020, the school announced that head coach Billy Wright's contract would not be renewed. He finished at Western Illinois with a six-year record of 53–115. On March 30, the school announced former Milwaukee head coach Rob Jeter would be hired as the new head coach.

== Roster ==
2020–21 Western Illinois Leathernecks men's basketball team
Players
Coaches

Pos.	#	Name	Height	Weight	Year	Previous school	Hometown
G	1	Anthony Jones	6 ft 5 in (1.96 m)	190 lb (86 kg)	Sr	Coffeyville Community College	Indianapolis, Indiana
F	2	Tamell Pearson	6 ft 10 in (2.08 m)	223 lb (101 kg)	Jr	UAB	Chicago, Illinois
G	3	Justin Brookens	5 ft 9 in (1.75 m)	175 lb (79 kg)	Jr	Iowa Lakes Community College	Milwaukee, Wisconsin
F	10	Cameron Burrell	6 ft 7 in (2.01 m)	175 lb (79 kg)	Jr	Highland Community College	Chicago, Illinois
F	11	Rod Johnson Jr.	6 ft 7 in (2.01 m)	200 lb (91 kg)	GS	Chattanooga	Sun Prairie, Wisconsin
F	12	Adam Anhold	6 ft 8 in (2.03 m)	240 lb (109 kg)	Jr	Highland Community College	Janesville, Wisconsin
G	14	Braden Lamar	6 ft 5 in (1.96 m)	190 lb (86 kg)	Fr	Bishop Gorman High School	Las Vegas, Nevada
G	15	JJ Flores	6 ft 3 in (1.91 m)	180 lb (82 kg)	Jr	Highland Community College	Lake in the Hills, Illinois
G	20	Colton Sandage	6 ft 2 in (1.88 m)	190 lb (86 kg)	Jr	Vincennes	Bloomington, Illinois
G	21	Robert Jeter IV	6 ft 0 in (1.83 m)	180 lb (82 kg)	Fr	East Ridge High School	Woodbury, Minnesota
G	22	Marcus Watson Jr.	6 ft 0 in (1.83 m)	170 lb (77 kg)	Fr	Morgan Park High School	Chicago, Illinois
F	23	Ramean Hinton	6 ft 5 in (1.96 m)	180 lb (82 kg)	Fr	Curie High School	Chicago, Illinois
F	25	Will Carius	6 ft 7 in (2.01 m)	225 lb (102 kg)	GS	Monmouth College	Bettendorf, Iowa
F	30	Jake Weyhrich	6 ft 7 in (2.01 m)	210 lb (95 kg)	Sr	Monmouth College	Manito, Illinois
G	35	Erik Talton	6 ft 1 in (1.85 m)	155 lb (70 kg)	Jr	Weatherford College	DeSoto, Texas
G	40	Matthew Wade	6 ft 0 in (1.83 m)	160 lb (73 kg)	Fr	Golda Meir School	Milwaukee, Wisconsin

Head coach

- Rob Jeter (UW–Platteville)

Assistant coach(es)

- Chad Boudreau (Hannibal–LaGrange)
- Kyle Heikkinen (UW–Whitewater)
- Nick Irvin (Fresno State)

Legend

- (C) Team captain
- (S) Suspended
- (I) Ineligible
- (W) Walk-on
- Injured
- Current redshirt

Roster
Last update: December 6, 2020

== Schedule and results ==
Date time, TV	Rank^{#}	Opponent^{#}	Result	Record	Site (attendance) city, state
Non-conference regular season
December 3, 2020*; 7:00 pm, BTN		at No. 3 Iowa	L 58–99	0–1	Carver–Hawkeye Arena (543); Iowa City, IA
December 6, 2020*; 2:30 pm		Central Michigan	L 73–79	0–2	Western Hall; Macomb, IL
December 9, 2020*; 5:30 pm, ESPN+		at Miami (OH); Miami Invitational	L 57–67	0–3	Millett Hall; Oxford, OH
December 10, 2020*; 2:00 pm, ESPN+		vs. Mount St. Joseph; Miami Invitational	W 80–55	1–3	Millett Hall; Oxford, OH
December 12, 2020*; 4:00 pm, ESPN+		at Eastern Illinois	L 88–92	1–4	Lantz Arena; Charleston, IL
December 20, 2020*; 1:00 pm, ESPN+		at UT Martin	W 81–63	2–4	Skyhawk Arena; Martin, TN
December 23, 2020*; 8:00 pm, FS1		at DePaul	L 72–91	2–5	Wintrust Arena; Chicago, IL
Summit League regular season
January 2, 2021; 7:00 pm		North Dakota State	L 50–68	2–6 (0–1)	Western Hall; Macomb, IL
January 3, 2021; 7:00 pm		North Dakota State	L 67–78	2–7 (0–2)	Western Hall; Macomb, IL
January 8, 2021; 7:30 pm		at South Dakota State	L 77–83	2–8 (0–3)	Frost Arena (623); Brookings, SD
January 9, 2021; 7:30 pm		at South Dakota State	L 63–92	2–9 (0–4)	Frost Arena (711); Brookings, SD
January 15, 2021; 7:00 pm		Kansas City	Canceled due to COVID-19 issues		Western Hall; Macomb, IL
January 16, 2021; 7:00 pm		Kansas City	Canceled due to COVID-19 issues		Western Hall; Macomb, IL
January 22, 2021; 7:00 pm		South Dakota	L 60–65	2–10 (0–5)	Western Hall; Macomb, IL
January 23, 2021; 7:00 pm		South Dakota	L 74–84	2–11 (0–6)	Western Hall; Macomb, IL
January 29, 2021; 7:30 pm, ESPN3		at North Dakota	L 81–83	2–12 (0–7)	Betty Engelstad Sioux Center (558); Grand Forks, ND
January 30, 2021; 7:00 pm, ESPN+		at North Dakota	W 99–87	3–12 (1–7)	Betty Engelstad Sioux Center (556); Grand Forks, ND
February 6, 2021; 8:00 pm		at Omaha	W 85–77	4–12 (2–7)	Baxter Arena; Omaha, NE
February 7, 2021; 8:00 pm		at Omaha	W 75–73	5–12 (3–7)	Baxter Arena; Omaha, NE
February 12, 2021; 7:00 pm		Denver	W 75–69	6–12 (4–7)	Western Hall; Macomb, IL
February 13, 2021; 7:00 pm		Denver	W 82–75	7–12 (5–7)	Western Hall; Macomb, IL
February 27, 2021; 7:00 pm		at Oral Roberts	L 81–85	7–13 (5–8)	Mabee Center; Tulsa, OK
February 28, 2021; 7:00 pm		at Oral Roberts	L 59–95	7–14 (5–9)	Mabee Center; Tulsa, OK
Summit League tournament
March 6, 2021; 8:45 pm, MidcoSN/ESPN+	(7)	vs. (2) South Dakota; Quarterfinals	L 69–86	7–15	Sanford Pentagon; Sioux Falls, SD
*Non-conference game. ^{#}Rankings from AP Poll. (#) Tournament seedings in parentheses. All times are in Central.
