= 2020–21 South Dakota Coyotes men's basketball team =

American college basketball season

2020–21 South Dakota Coyotes men's basketball
- Conference: Summit League
- Record: 14–11 (11–4 The Summit)
- Head coach: Todd Lee (3rd season)
- Assistant coaches: Gameli Ahelegbe; Brad Davidson; Casey Kasperbauer
- Home arena: Sanford Coyote Sports Center

2020–21 Summit League men's basketball standings
	Conf.				Overall
Team	W		L	PCT	W		L	PCT
South Dakota State	9	–	3	.750	16	–	7	.696
South Dakota	11	–	4	.733	14	–	11	.560
North Dakota State	11	–	5	.688	15	–	12	.556
Oral Roberts †	10	–	5	.667	18	–	11	.621
North Dakota	8	–	8	.500	9	–	17	.346
Kansas City	7	–	7	.500	11	–	13	.458
Western Illinois	5	–	9	.357	7	–	15	.318
Omaha	3	–	11	.214	5	–	20	.200
Denver	1	–	13	.071	2	–	19	.095
† 2021 Summit League Tournament winner

The 2020–21 South Dakota Coyotes men's basketball team represented the University of South Dakota during the 2020–21 NCAA Division I men's basketball season. The Coyotes, led by third-year head coach Todd Lee, played their home games at the Sanford Coyote Sports Center in Vermillion, South Dakota as members of the Summit League.

== Previous season ==
The Coyotes finished the 2018–19 season 20–12, 10–6 in Summit League play to finish in third place. They lost in the quarterfinals of the Summit League tournament to North Dakota.

== Roster ==
2020–21 South Dakota Coyotes men's basketball team
Players
Coaches

Pos.	#	Name	Height	Weight	Year	Hometown
G	0	Stanley Umude	6 ft 6 in (1.98 m)	210 lb (95 kg)	Sr	San Antonio, Texas
G	1	Ty Chisom	6 ft 4 in (1.93 m)	190 lb (86 kg)	Sr	Chicago, Illinois
G	2	Boogie Anderson	6 ft 3 in (1.91 m)	187 lb (85 kg)	Jr	Chandler, Arizona
G	3	Xavier Fuller	6 ft 4 in (1.93 m)	170 lb (77 kg)	Jr	Mesa, Arizona
G	5	Kruz Perrott-Hunt	6 ft 3 in (1.91 m)	195 lb (88 kg)	So	Auckland, New Zealand
G	10	A.J. Plitzuweit	6 ft 2 in (1.88 m)	170 lb (77 kg)	RS So	Vermillion, South Dakota
G	11	Mason Archambault	6 ft 0 in (1.83 m)	188 lb (85 kg)	Jr	Rapid City, South Dakota
F	12	Hunter Goodrick	6 ft 7 in (2.01 m)	215 lb (98 kg)	So	Sydney, Australia
G	20	Max Burchill	6 ft 2 in (1.88 m)	198 lb (90 kg)	Fr	Sioux Falls, South Dakota
F	23	Edin Smjecanin	6 ft 7 in (2.01 m)	219 lb (99 kg)	Fr	Sarajevo, Bosnia and Herzegovina
G	24	Kanon Koster	6 ft 4 in (1.93 m)	220 lb (100 kg)	RS So	Kearney, Nebraska
G	25	Damani Hayes	6 ft 4 in (1.93 m)	223 lb (101 kg)	Jr	Mankato, Minnesota
F	32	Nikola Zizic	6 ft 11 in (2.11 m)	238 lb (108 kg)	Fr	Podogorica, Montenegro
F	34	Tasos Kamateros	6 ft 8 in (2.03 m)	240 lb (109 kg)	So	Athens, Greece
F	45	Brady Heiman	6 ft 11 in (2.11 m)	210 lb (95 kg)	So	Springfield, Nebraska
G	55	D.J. Dial	5 ft 8 in (1.73 m)	150 lb (68 kg)	So	Cleveland, Ohio

Head coach

- Todd Lee (South Dakota)

Assistant coach(es)

- Gameli Ahelegbe (Minnesota State)
- Brad Davidson (North Dakota)
- Casey Kasperbauer (South Dakota)

Legend

- (C) Team captain
- (S) Suspended
- (I) Ineligible
- (W) Walk-on
- Injured
- Current redshirt

Roster
Last update: 2020-11-12

== Schedule and results ==
Date time, TV	Rank^{#}	Opponent^{#}	Result	Record	Site (attendance) city, state
Non-conference Regular season
Nov 25, 2020*; 7:00 pm, ESPN+		vs. Colorado; Little Apple Classic	L 61–84	0–1	Bramlage Coliseum; Manhattan, KS
Nov 27, 2020*; 1:00 pm		vs. Drake; Little Apple Classic	L 53–69	0–2	Bramlage Coliseum; Manhattan, KS
Dec 1, 2020*; 8:00 pm, BTN		at Nebraska	L 69–76	0–3	Pinnacle Bank Arena (25); Lincoln, NE
Dec 5, 2020; 7:00 pm		at Kansas City	Canceled		Swinney Recreation Center; Kansas City, MO
Dec 10, 2020*; 5:30 pm		vs. North Dakota; Dakota Showcase	L 71–75	0–4	Sanford Pentagon; Sioux Falls, SD
Dec 11, 2020*; 8:00 pm		vs. North Dakota State; Dakota Showcase	L 67–74	0–5	Sanford Pentagon; Sioux Falls, SD
Dec 12, 2020*; 8:00 pm		vs. South Dakota State; Dakota Showcase	W 91–78	1–5	Sanford Pentagon; Sioux Falls, SD
Dec 18, 2020*; 6:00 pm		Drake	L 57–75	1–6	Sanford Coyote Sports Center; Vermillion, SD
Dec 20, 2020*; 5:00 pm		Mount Marty	W 84–44	2–6	Sanford Coyote Sports Center; Vermillion, SD
Summit League Regular season
Jan 2, 2021; 4:00 pm, ESPN3		Denver	W 93–54	3–6 (1–0)	Sanford Coyote Sports Center (559); Vermillion, SD
Jan 3, 2021; 4:00 pm, ESPN+		Denver	W 79–57	4–6 (2–0)	Sanford Coyote Sports Center (420); Vermillion, SD
Jan 8, 2021; 7:00 pm		at Kansas City	W 66–64	5–6 (3–0)	Swinney Recreation Center; Kansas City, MO
Jan 9, 2021; 7:00 pm		at Kansas City	W 68–62	6–6 (4–0)	Swinney Recreation Center; Kansas City, MO
Jan 22, 2021; 7:00 pm		at Western Illinois	W 65–60	7–6 (5–0)	Western Hall; Macomb, IL
Jan 23, 2021; 7:00 pm		at Western Illinois	W 84–74	8–6 (6–0)	Western Hall; Macomb, IL
Jan 29, 2021; 8:00 pm, MidcoSN		Omaha	W 91–59	9–6 (7–0)	Sanford Coyote Sports Center (743); Vermillion, SD
Jan 30, 2021; 7:00 pm, MidcoSN		Omaha	W 97–93	10–6 (8–0)	Sanford Coyote Sports Center (619); Vermillion, SD
Feb 5, 2021; 7:30 pm, MidcoSN2		at South Dakota State	W 64–56	11–6 (9–0)	Frost Arena (895); Brookings, SD
Feb 6, 2021; 7:30 pm, MidcoSN2		at South Dakota State	L 78–89	11–7 (9–1)	Frost Arena (913); Brookings, SD
Feb 12, 2021; 7:00 pm, MidcoSN		at North Dakota	L 76–85	11–8 (9–2)	Betty Engelstad Sioux Center (650); Grand Forks, ND
Feb 13, 2021; 7:30 pm, MidcoSN		at North Dakota	L 81–85	11–9 (9–3)	Betty Engelstad Sioux Center (650); Grand Forks, ND
Feb 20, 2021; 4:00 pm		Oral Roberts	W 86–84	12–9 (10–3)	Sanford Coyote Sports Center (1,007); Vermillion, SD
Feb 21, 2021; 3:00 pm		Oral Roberts	Canceled due to COVID-19 issues		Sanford Coyote Sports Center; Vermillion, SD
Feb 27, 2021; 4:00 pm		North Dakota State	W 80–71	13–9 (11–3)	Sanford Coyote Sports Center; Vermillion, SD
Feb 28, 2021; 4:00 pm		North Dakota State	L 77–89	13–10 (11–4)	Sanford Coyote Sports Center; Vermillion, SD
Summit League tournament
Mar 6, 2020; 8:45 pm, MidcoSN/ESPN+	(2)	vs. (7) Western Illinois; Quarterfinals	W 86–69	14–10	Sanford Pentagon; Sioux Falls, SD
Mar 8, 2020; 8:45 pm, MidcoSN/ESPN+	(2)	vs. (3) North Dakota State; Semifinals	L 75–79	14–11	Sanford Pentagon; Sioux Falls, SD
*Non-conference game. ^{#}Rankings from AP Poll. (#) Tournament seedings in parentheses. All times are in Central Time.
