= 2020–21 Denver Pioneers men's basketball team =

American college basketball season

2020–21 Denver Pioneers men's basketball
- Conference: Summit League
- Record: 2–19 (1–13 The Summit)
- Head coach: Rodney Billups (5th season)
- Assistant coaches: Bacari Alexander; Raman Sposato; Dwight Thorne II
- Home arena: Hamilton Gymnasium

2020–21 Summit League men's basketball standings
	Conf.				Overall
Team	W		L	PCT	W		L	PCT
South Dakota State	9	–	3	.750	16	–	7	.696
South Dakota	11	–	4	.733	14	–	11	.560
North Dakota State	11	–	5	.688	15	–	12	.556
Oral Roberts †	10	–	5	.667	18	–	11	.621
North Dakota	8	–	8	.500	9	–	17	.346
Kansas City	7	–	7	.500	11	–	13	.458
Western Illinois	5	–	9	.357	7	–	15	.318
Omaha	3	–	11	.214	5	–	20	.200
Denver	1	–	13	.071	2	–	19	.095
† 2021 Summit League Tournament winner

The 2020–21 Denver Pioneers men's basketball team represented the University of Denver in the 2020–21 NCAA Division I men's basketball season. The Pioneers, led by fifth-year head coach Rodney Billups, played their home games at Hamilton Gymnasium in Denver, Colorado as members of the Summit League. In a season limited due to the ongoing COVID-19 pandemic, the Pioneers finished the season 2–19, 1–13 in Summit League play, to finish in last place. They failed to qualify for the Summit League tournament.

On March 1, 2021, the school fired Billups after five seasons as head coach. On March 29, the school named former Stanford associate head coach Jeff Wulbrun the team's new head coach.

== Previous season ==
The Pioneers finished the 2019–20 season 7–24, 3–13 in Summit League play, to finish in eighth place. They lost in the quarterfinals of the Summit League tournament to North Dakota State.

== Roster ==
2020–21 Denver Pioneers men's basketball team
Players
Coaches

Pos.	#	Name	Height	Weight	Year	Previous school	Hometown
G	0	Kobey Lam	6 ft 2 in (1.88 m)	170 lb (77 kg)	So	Williston State College	Vaughan, ON
G	1	Korey Hess	5 ft 11 in (1.8 m)	160 lb (73 kg)	Fr	Arapahoe High School	Centennial, CO
G	2	Roscoe Eastmond	5 ft 9 in (1.75 m)	150 lb (68 kg)	So	Wheeler High School	Marietta, GA
G	3	Jase Townsend	6 ft 3 in (1.91 m)	175 lb (79 kg)	Jr	Skyline High School	Dallas, TX
G	4	Taelyr Gatlin	6 ft 3 in (1.91 m)	180 lb (82 kg)	Jr	Brighton High School	Jackson, MS
G	5	Drake Muller	6 ft 4 in (1.93 m)	195 lb (88 kg)	Fr	Greenhill School	Cedar Hill, TX
G	11	Noah Baylis	5 ft 11 in (1.8 m)	165 lb (75 kg)	Fr	Flint Powers Catholic High School	Flint, MI
G	12	Iseri Palacio	6 ft 0 in (1.83 m)	170 lb (77 kg)	Jr	Fort Collins High School	Fort Collins, CO
G	13	Khalil Johnson	6 ft 3 in (1.91 m)	170 lb (77 kg)	Jr	Three Rivers Community College	Long Island, NY
G	14	Ryan Heath	6 ft 5 in (1.96 m)	190 lb (86 kg)	So	DeWitt High School	Lansing, MI
F	15	James IV Sanders	6 ft 3 in (1.91 m)	200 lb (91 kg)	So	Fountain-Fort Carson High School	Fountain, CO
F	20	Sam Jr. Hines	6 ft 6 in (1.98 m)	210 lb (95 kg)	Fr	Wheeler High School	Marietta, GA
F	21	Robert Jones	6 ft 10 in (2.08 m)	225 lb (102 kg)	So	Prior Lake High School	Prior Lake, MN
F	22	Tristan Green	6 ft 9 in (2.06 m)	220 lb (100 kg)	Jr	Ranger College	Boerne, TX
F	24	Frank Ryder	6 ft 10 in (2.08 m)	235 lb (107 kg)	Sr	Colorado	Boulder, CO
G	30	Eric Moenkhaus	6 ft 3 in (1.91 m)	180 lb (82 kg)	So	Lincoln Trail College	Greenwood, IN
F	42	JaVonni Bickham	6 ft 6 in (1.98 m)	225 lb (102 kg)	So	Minnehaha Academy	Minneapolis, MN

Head coach

- Rodney Billups (Denver)

Assistant coach(es)

- Bacari Alexander (Detroit Mercy)
- Raman Sposato (Oregon)
- Dwight Thorne II (Colorado)

Legend

- (C) Team captain
- (S) Suspended
- (I) Ineligible
- (W) Walk-on
- Injured
- Current redshirt

Roster
Last update: December 4, 2020

== Schedule and results ==
Date time, TV	Rank^{#}	Opponent^{#}	Result	Record	Site (attendance) city, state
Non-conference regular season
November 25, 2020*; 6:00 p.m.		Colorado Christian	Canceled due to COVID-19 protocols		Hamilton Gymnasium; Denver, CO
November 28, 2020*; 1:00 p.m.		Regis	W 82–66	1–0	Hamilton Gymnasium; Denver, CO
December 2, 2020*		at Air Force	Canceled due to COVID-19 protocols		Clune Arena; Colorado Springs, CO
December 6, 2020*; 1:00 p.m.		UC Riverside	L 63–83	1–1	Hamilton Gymnasium; Denver, CO
December 9, 2020*; 7:00 p.m., MWN		at Wyoming	L 61–83	1–2	Arena-Auditorium; Laramie, WY
December 12, 2020*; 1:00 p.m.		Dixie State	L 70–73	1–3	Hamilton Gymnasium; Denver, CO
December 16, 2020*; 6:00 p.m., Altitude 2		Northern Colorado	L 75–83	1–4	Hamilton Gymnasium; Denver, CO
December 19, 2020*; 12:00 p.m., Altitude		Texas State	L 68–70	1–5	Hamilton Gymnasium; Denver, CO
December 22, 2021*; 1:00 p.m., Altitude		Northern Arizona	L 65–68	1–6	Hamilton Gymnasium; Denver, CO
December 29, 2021*; 7:00 p.m.		at Grand Canyon	Canceled due to COVID-19 protocols		GCU Arena; Phoenix, AZ
Summit League regular season
January 2, 2021; 3:00 p.m., MidcoSN		at South Dakota	L 54–93	1–7 (0–1)	Sanford Coyote Sports Center (559); Vermillion, SD
January 3, 2021; 3:00 p.m., MidcoSN		at South Dakota	L 57–79	1–8 (0–2)	Sanford Coyote Sports Center (420); Vermillion, SD
January 15, 2021; 1:00 p.m.		Oral Roberts	L 84–88	1–9 (0–3)	Hamilton Gymnasium; Denver, CO
January 16, 2021; 1:00 p.m.		Oral Roberts	L 82–91	1–10 (0–4)	Hamilton Gymnasium; Denver, CO
January 22, 2021; 6:30 p.m.		at North Dakota State	L 58–70	1–11 (0–5)	Scheels Center (1,277); Fargo, ND
January 23, 2021; 6:30 p.m., MidcoSN		at North Dakota State	L 58–84	1–12 (0–6)	Scheels Center (1,568); Fargo, ND
January 29, 2021; 7:00 p.m., Altitude 2		South Dakota State	Canceled due to COVID-19 protocols		Hamilton Gymnasium; Denver, CO
January 30, 2021; 7:00 p.m., Altitude 2		South Dakota State	Canceled due to COVID-19 protocols		Hamilton Gymnasium; Denver, CO
February 5, 2021; 1:00 p.m.		North Dakota	L 82–85 ^{OT}	1–13 (0–7)	Hamilton Gymnasium; Denver, CO
February 6, 2021; 1:00 p.m.		North Dakota	W 85–81 ^{OT}	2–13 (1–7)	Hamilton Gymnasium; Denver, CO
February 12, 2021; 6:00 p.m.		at Western Illinois	L 69–75	2–14 (1–8)	Western Hall; Macomb, IL
February 13, 2021; 6:00 p.m.		at Western Illinois	L 75–82	2–15 (1–9)	Western Hall; Macomb, IL
February 19, 2021; 6:00 p.m.		at Kansas City	L 57–68	2–16 (1–10)	Swinney Recreation Center; Kansas City, MO
February 20, 2021; 6:00 p.m.		at Kansas City	L 69–80	2–17 (1–11)	Swinney Recreation Center; Kansas City, MO
February 26, 2021; 1:00 p.m.		Omaha	L 76–80	2–18 (1–12)	Hamilton Gymnasium; Denver, CO
February 27, 2021; 6:00 p.m.		Omaha	L 76–80	2–19 (1–13)	Hamilton Gymnasium; Denver, CO
*Non-conference game. ^{#}Rankings from AP poll. (#) Tournament seedings in parentheses. All times are in Mountain.
