= 2020–21 North Dakota State Bison men's basketball team =

American college basketball season

2020–21 North Dakota State Bison men's basketball
- Conference: Summit League
- Record: 15–12 (11–5 The Summit)
- Head coach: David Richman (7th season)
- Assistant coaches: Kyan Brown; Joshua Jones; Josh Sash
- Home arena: Scheels Center

2020–21 Summit League men's basketball standings
	Conf.				Overall
Team	W		L	PCT	W		L	PCT
South Dakota State	9	–	3	.750	16	–	7	.696
South Dakota	11	–	4	.733	14	–	11	.560
North Dakota State	11	–	5	.688	15	–	12	.556
Oral Roberts †	10	–	5	.667	18	–	11	.621
North Dakota	8	–	8	.500	9	–	17	.346
Kansas City	7	–	7	.500	11	–	13	.458
Western Illinois	5	–	9	.357	7	–	15	.318
Omaha	3	–	11	.214	5	–	20	.200
Denver	1	–	13	.071	2	–	19	.095
† 2021 Summit League Tournament winner

The 2020–21 North Dakota State Bison men's basketball team represented North Dakota State University in the 2020–21 NCAA Division I men's basketball season. The Bison, led by 7th-year head coach David Richman, played their home games at the Scheels Center in Fargo, North Dakota, as members of the Summit League.

== Previous season ==
The Bison finished the 2019–20 season 25–8, 13–3 in Summit League play to finish in a tie for the Summit League regular season championship. They defeated Denver, Oral Roberts, and North Dakota to become champions of the 2020 Summit League tournament. They earned the Summit League's automatic bid to the NCAA tournament, however, the tournament was cancelled amid the COVID-19 pandemic.

== Roster ==
2020–21 North Dakota State Bison men's basketball team
Players
Coaches

Pos.	#	Name	Height	Weight	Year	Previous school	Hometown
G	0	Dezmond McKinney	6 ft 0 in (1.83 m)	170 lb (77 kg)	Fr	Raytown South High School	Raytown, Missouri
G	2	Jaxon Knotek	6 ft 6 in (1.98 m)	215 lb (98 kg)	Jr	River Falls High School	River Falls, Wisconsin
G	3	Tyree Eady	6 ft 5 in (1.96 m)	210 lb (95 kg)	Jr	Middleton High School	Middleton, Wisconsin
F	4	Grant Nelson	6 ft 10 in (2.08 m)	215 lb (98 kg)	Fr	Devils Lake High School	Devils Lake, North Dakota
G/F	5	Sam Griesel	6 ft 6 in (1.98 m)	215 lb (98 kg)	Jr	Lincoln East High School	Lincoln, Nebraska
G	11	Jarius Cook	6 ft 3 in (1.91 m)	180 lb (82 kg)	So	Park Center High School	Brooklyn Park, Minnesota
G	21	Boden Skunberg	6 ft 5 in (1.96 m)	205 lb (93 kg)	Fr	Jamestown High School	Jamestown, North Dakota
G	23	Maleeck Harden-Hayes	6 ft 7 in (2.01 m)	185 lb (84 kg)	So	Moorhead High School	Moorhead, Minnesota
G	24	Grayson Haman	6 ft 3 in (1.91 m)	190 lb (86 kg)	Fr	Fargo Davies High School	Fargo, North Dakota
G	25	Donald Carter III	6 ft 0 in (1.83 m)	195 lb (88 kg)	Jr	Scottsdale Community College	Minneapolis, Minnesota
F	32	Odell Wilson	6 ft 6 in (1.98 m)	245 lb (111 kg)	So	Minneapolis North High School	Minneapolis, Minnesota
F	34	Rocky Kreuser	6 ft 10 in (2.08 m)	245 lb (111 kg)	Sr	Totino-Grace High School	White Bear Lake, Minnesota
F	44	Tyler Witz	6 ft 9 in (2.06 m)	245 lb (111 kg)	Sr	Olney Central College	Clearwater, Florida

Head coach

- David Richman (North Dakota State)

Assistant coach(es)

- Kyan Brown (Oral Roberts)
- Joshua Jones (Eastern Kentucky)
- Josh Sash (William Penn)

Legend

- (C) Team captain
- (S) Suspended
- (I) Ineligible
- (W) Walk-on
- Injured
- Current redshirt

Roster
Last update: December 8, 2020

== Schedule and results ==
Date time, TV	Rank^{#}	Opponent^{#}	Result	Record	Site (attendance) city, state
Non-conference regular season
November 25, 2020*; 2:00 pm		vs. Nevada; Golden Window Classic	L 48–62	0–1	Pinnacle Bank Arena; Lincoln, NE
November 28, 2020*; 11:00 am, BTN		at Nebraska; Golden Window Classic	L 57–79	0–2	Pinnacle Bank Arena; Lincoln, NE
November 29, 2020*; 3:30 pm, FS1		at No. 11 Creighton	L 58–69	0–3	CHI Health Center Omaha (252); Omaha, NE
December 5, 2020*; 3:00 pm, ESPN+		at No. 7 Kansas	L 61–65	0–4	Allen Fieldhouse; Lawrence, KS
December 10, 2020*; 8:00 pm, MidcoSN		vs. South Dakota State; Dakota Showcase	L 75–77	0–5	Sanford Pentagon; Sioux Falls, SD
December 11, 2020*; 8:00 pm, MidcoSN		vs. South Dakota; Dakota Showcase	W 74–67	1–5	Sanford Pentagon; Sioux Falls, SD
December 12, 2020*; 5:30 pm, MidcoSN		vs. North Dakota; Dakota Showcase	W 53–52	2–5	Sanford Pentagon; Sioux Falls, SD
December 22, 2020*; 8:00 pm, ESPNU		at TCU	L 82–89	2–6	Schollmaier Arena (1,669); Fort Worth, TX
Summit League regular season
January 2, 2021; 7:00 pm		at Western Illinois	W 68–50	3–6 (1–0)	Western Hall; Macomb, IL
January 3, 2021; 7:00 pm		at Western Illinois	W 78–67	4–6 (2–0)	Western Hall; Macomb, IL
January 8, 2021; 7:30 pm, ESPN+		Omaha	W 71–69	5–6 (3–0)	Scheels Center (954); Fargo, ND
January 9, 2021; 7:30 pm, ESPN+		Omaha	W 80–66	6–6 (4–0)	Scheels Center (1,245); Fargo, ND
January 15, 2021; 7:30 pm, MidcoSN		at North Dakota	W 62–45	7–6 (5–0)	Betty Engelstad Sioux Center (650); Grand Forks, ND
January 16, 2021; 7:30 pm, MidcoSN		at North Dakota	L 78–82 ^{OT}	7–7 (5–1)	Betty Engelstad Sioux Center (650); Grand Forks, ND
January 22, 2021; 7:30 pm		Denver	W 70–58	8–7 (6–1)	Scheels Center (1,277); Fargo, ND
January 23, 2021; 7:30 pm, MidcoSN		Denver	W 84–58	9–7 (7–1)	Scheels Center (1,568); Fargo, ND
January 29, 2021; 7:00 pm		at Kansas City	W 71–67	10–7 (8–1)	Swinney Recreation Center; Kansas City, MO
January 30, 2021; 7:00 pm		at Kansas City	L 47–49	10–8 (8–2)	Swinney Recreation Center; Kansas City, MO
February 5, 2021; 7:30 pm		Oral Roberts	W 61–54	11–8 (9–2)	Scheels Center (1,072); Fargo, ND
February 6, 2021; 7:30 pm		Oral Roberts	L 74–80	11–9 (9–3)	Scheels Center (1,547); Fargo, ND
February 19, 2021; 7:30 pm, MidcoSN		South Dakota State	L 67–68	11–10 (9–4)	Scheels Center (1,734); Fargo, ND
February 20, 2021; 7:30 pm, MidcoSN		South Dakota State	W 84–82	12–10 (10–4)	Scheels Center (2,754); Fargo, ND
February 27, 2021; 4:00 pm		at South Dakota	L 71–80	12–11 (10–5)	Sanford Coyote Sports Center; Vermillion, SD
February 28, 2021; 4:00 pm, MidcoSN2		at South Dakota	W 89–77	13–11 (11–5)	Sanford Coyote Sports Center; Vermillion, SD
Summit League tournament
March 7, 2021; 8:45 pm, MidcoSN/ESPN+	(3)	vs. (6) Kansas City; Quarterfinals	W 69–65	14–11	Sanford Pentagon; Sioux Falls, SD
March 8, 2021; 8:45 pm, MidcoSN/ESPN+	(3)	vs. (2) South Dakota; Semifinals	W 79–75	15–11	Sanford Pentagon; Sioux Falls, SD
March 9, 2021; 8:00 pm, ESPN2	(3)	vs. (4) Oral Roberts; Championship	L 72–75	15–12	Sanford Pentagon; Sioux Falls, SD
*Non-conference game. ^{#}Rankings from AP Poll. (#) Tournament seedings in parentheses. All times are in Central.
