= 2021 Summit League men's basketball tournament =

- Classification: Division I
- Season: 2020–21
- Teams: 8
- Site: Sanford Pentagon; Sioux Falls, South Dakota
- Champions: Oral Roberts (4th title)
- Winning coach: Paul Mills (1st title)
- MVP: Max Abmas (Oral Roberts)
- Television: MidcoSN/MidcoSN2/ESPN+/ESPN2

2020–21 Summit League men's basketball standings
	Conf.				Overall
Team	W		L	PCT	W		L	PCT
South Dakota State	9	–	3	.750	16	–	7	.696
South Dakota	11	–	4	.733	14	–	11	.560
North Dakota State	11	–	5	.688	15	–	12	.556
Oral Roberts †	10	–	5	.667	18	–	11	.621
North Dakota	8	–	8	.500	9	–	17	.346
Kansas City	7	–	7	.500	11	–	13	.458
Western Illinois	5	–	9	.357	7	–	15	.318
Omaha	3	–	11	.214	5	–	20	.200
Denver	1	–	13	.071	2	–	19	.095
† 2021 Summit League Tournament winner

The 2021 Summit League men's basketball tournament was the postseason men's basketball tournament for the Summit League for the 2020–21 season. All tournament games were played at the Sanford Pentagon in Sioux Falls, South Dakota, from March 6–9, 2021.

Fourth-seeded Oral Roberts defeated third-seeded North Dakota State, 75-72, to claim their fourth Summit League title and earn the automatic bid to the NCAA tournament.

== Seeds ==
The top eight teams by conference record in the Summit League competed in the conference tournament. Teams were seeded by record within the conference, with a tiebreaker system to seed teams with identical conference records. The tiebreakers operate in the following order:

1. Head-to-head record.
2. Record against the top-seeded team not involved in the tie, going down through the standings until the tie is broken.

Seed	School	Conf. record	Tiebreaker(s)
1	South Dakota State	9–3	
2	South Dakota	11–4	
3	North Dakota State	11–5	
4	Oral Roberts	10–5	
5	North Dakota	8–8	2–0 vs. South Dakota
6	Kansas City	7–7	0–2 vs. South Dakota
7	Western Illinois	5–9	
8	Omaha	3–11	

== Schedule and results ==
Game	Time	Matchup	Score	Television
Quarterfinals – Saturday, March 6
1	5:45 pm	No. 1 South Dakota State vs. No. 8 Omaha	84–71	MidcoSN/ESPN+
2	8:45 pm	No. 2 South Dakota vs. No. 7 Western Illinois	86–69	MidcoSN/ESPN+
Quarterfinals – Sunday, March 7
3	5:45 pm	No. 4 Oral Roberts vs. No. 5 North Dakota	76–65	MidcoSN/ESPN+
4	8:45 pm	No. 3 North Dakota State vs. No. 6 Kansas City	69–65	MidcoSN/ESPN+
Semifinals – Monday, March 8
5	5:45 pm	No. 1 South Dakota State vs. No. 4 Oral Roberts	88–90	MidcoSN/ESPN+
6	8:45 pm	No. 2 South Dakota vs. No. 3 North Dakota State	75–79	MidcoSN/ESPN+
Final – Tuesday, March 9
7	8:00 pm	No. 4 Oral Roberts vs. No. 3 North Dakota State	75–72	ESPN2
*Game times in CST. Rankings denote tournament seed.

== Bracket ==
Quarterfinals; March 6 & 7 TV: MidcoSN
1	South Dakota State	84
8	Omaha	71
4	Oral Roberts	76
5	North Dakota	65
2	South Dakota	86
7	Western Illinois	69
3	North Dakota State	69
6	Kansas City	65

Semifinals; March 8 TV: MidcoSN
1	South Dakota State	88
4	Oral Roberts	90
2	South Dakota	75
3	North Dakota State	79

Final; March 9 TV: ESPN2
4	Oral Roberts	75
3	North Dakota State	72

== All-Tournament Team ==
The following players were named to the All-Tournament Team:

Player	School
Max Abmas (MVP)	Oral Roberts
Kevin Obanor	Oral Roberts
Tyree Eady	North Dakota State
Rocky Kreuser	North Dakota State
Stanley Umude	South Dakoka
