= Kevin Obanor =

American basketball player (born 1999)

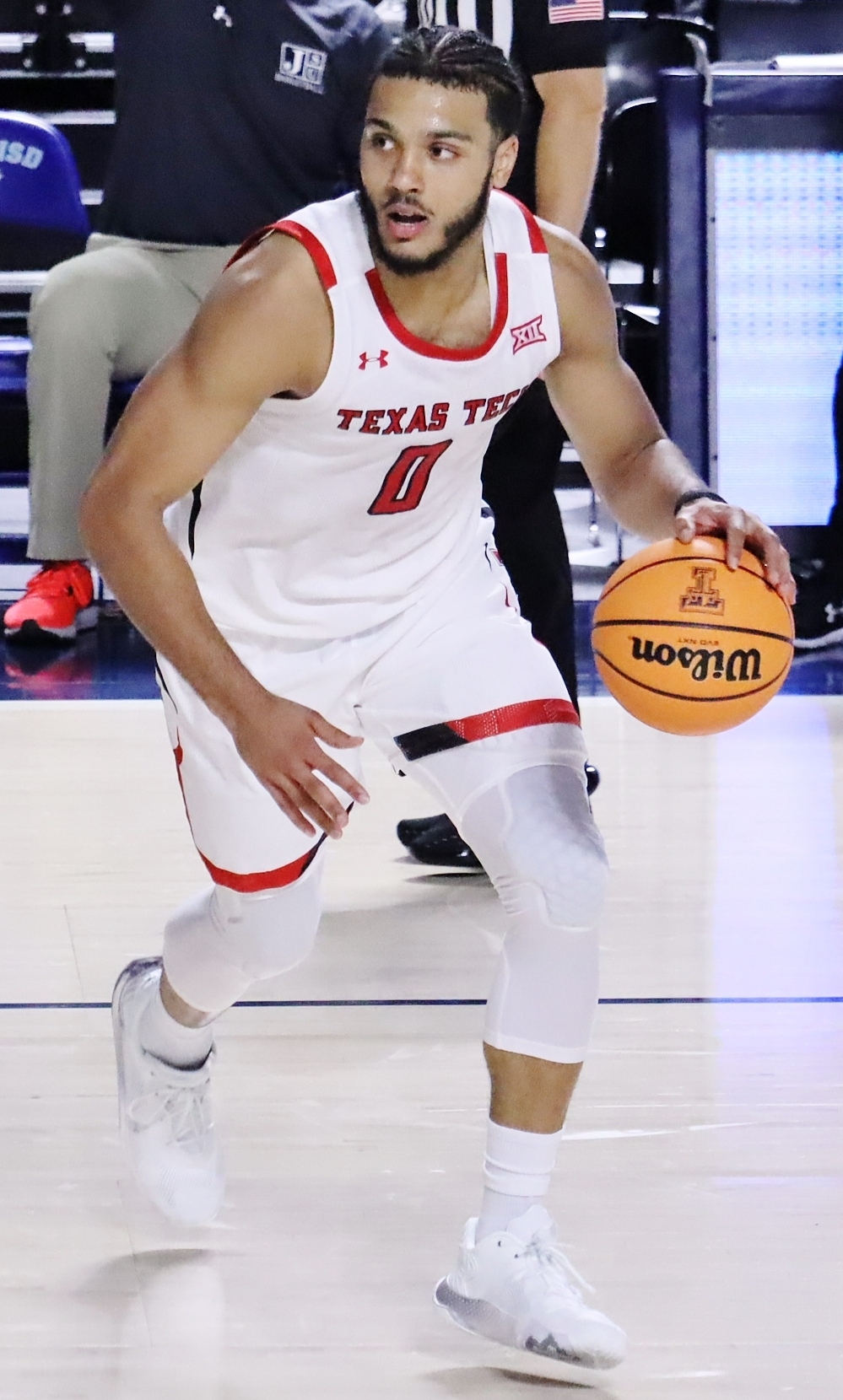
- Obanor with Texas Tech in 2022

Free agent
- Position: Small forward

Personal information
- Born: June 12, 1999 (age 27) Houston, Texas, U.S.
- Listed height: 6 ft 8 in (2.03 m)
- Listed weight: 235 lb (107 kg)

Career information
- High school: Alief Hastings (Houston, Texas); Mount Zion Christian Academy (Durham, North Carolina)
- College: Oral Roberts (2018–2021); Texas Tech (2021–2023)
- NBA draft: 2023: undrafted
- Playing career: 2023–present

Career history
- 2023–2024: Raptors 905
- 2024–2025: Long Island Nets
- 2025: Filou Oostende

Career highlights
- First-team All-Summit League (2021); Second-team All-Summit League (2019); Summit League Freshman of the Year (2019)
- Stats at NBA.com
- Stats at Basketball Reference

Kevin Charles Obanor (born June 12, 1999) is an American professional basketball player who last played for Filou Oostende of Belgian BNXT League and the Champions League. He played college basketball for the Oral Roberts Golden Eagles and the Texas Tech Red Raiders.

== Early life and high school career ==
Obanor grew up in Houston, Texas and was cut from his eighth-grade basketball team. He began focusing on basketball as a sophomore at Alief Hastings High School after experiencing a growth spurt. Obanor transferred to Mount Zion Christian Academy, where he also competed in football and cross country. He received some major Division I college attention, but was ranked a two-star prospect. Obanor committed to Oral Roberts, as he was drawn to their faith-based mission.

== College career ==
Obanor skipped his final semester of high school and arrived at Oral Roberts in January 2018, opting to redshirt the season. As a redshirt freshman, Obanor led the Golden Eagles in scoring with 14.4 points per game while also posting 7.2 rebounds per game. He was named Summit League Freshman of the Year as well as Second Team All-Summit League. He averaged 12.3 points and 6.8 rebounds per game as a sophomore.

On January 2, 2021, Obanor scored a career-high 39 points and had 10 rebounds in a 95–83 win against Omaha. He recorded 14 points in the semifinals of the Summit League Tournament against South Dakota State, including a buzzer-beating tip-in to carry the Golden Eagles to a 90–88 victory. Obanor helped 15 seed Oral Roberts reach the Sweet 16 of the NCAA Tournament. He posted 30 points and 11 rebounds in the upset against Ohio State, followed by 28 points and 11 rebounds against Florida. As a redshirt junior, Obanor averaged 18.7 points and 9.6 rebounds per game. He was named to the First Team All-Summit League.

Following the season, Obanor transferred to Texas Tech, choosing the Red Raiders over Arkansas. He averaged 10 points and 5.5 rebounds per game. Obanor announced after the season that he was returning for his fifth season of eligibility. On January 30, 2023, Obanor posted 24 points and 13 rebounds in an 80–77 overtime win over Iowa State and surpassed the 2,000-point mark.

== Professional career ==
After going undrafted in the 2023 NBA draft, Obanor joined the Toronto Raptors for the 2023 NBA Summer League. On August 1, 2023, he signed with the Raptors, but was waived on September 28. On October 30, he joined Raptors 905.

On October 19, Obanor signed with Toronto, but was waived the same day. On October 28, he rejoined Raptors 905, but was waived on December 16.

On December 19, 2024, Obanor joined the Long Island Nets.

For the 2025–26 season, Obanor signed with Filou Oostende of the Belgian BNXT League and the Champions League. He played only two games and left the team on October 28, 2025.

== Career statistics ==
Legend
| GP | Games played | GS | Games started | MPG | Minutes per game |
| FG% | Field goal percentage | 3P% | 3-point field goal percentage | FT% | Free throw percentage |
| RPG | Rebounds per game | APG | Assists per game | SPG | Steals per game |
| BPG | Blocks per game | PPG | Points per game | **Bold** | Career high |

=== College ===
| Year | Team | GP | GS | MPG | FG% | 3P% | FT% | RPG | APG | SPG | BPG | PPG |
|---|---|---|---|---|---|---|---|---|---|---|---|---|
| 2017–18 | Oral Roberts | Redshirt | | | | | | | | | | |
| 2018–19 | Oral Roberts | 28 | 11 | 22.4 | **.583** | .413 | .827 | 7.2 | .5 | .1 | .3 | 14.4 |
| 2019–20 | Oral Roberts | 31 | 28 | 24.6 | .475 | .388 | .800 | 6.8 | .7 | .4 | **.8** | 12.3 |
| 2020–21 | Oral Roberts | 28 | 28 | **31.9** | .503 | **.463** | **.875** | **9.6** | **1.1** | .5 | .7 | **18.7** |
| 2021–22 | Texas Tech | **37** | **37** | 26.1 | .467 | .336 | .761 | 5.5 | .5 | .3 | .4 | 10.0 |
| 2022–23 | Texas Tech | 32 | 32 | 30.9 | .492 | .331 | .810 | 6.4 | .9 | **.8** | .4 | 14.4 |
| Career | | 156 | 136 | 27.2 | .501 | .381 | .820 | 7.0 | .7 | .4 | .5 | 13.7 |

== See also ==
- List of NCAA Division I men's basketball players with 2,000 points and 1,000 rebounds
