= Mount Zion Christian Academy =

American, private, christian school in North Carolina

Location
- 3519 Fayetteville St; Durham, North Carolina 27707; United States; 35°57′21″N 78°54′23″W

Information
- Type: Private, day school, boarding school
- Religious affiliation: Christian
- Established: 1986
- Principal: Peggy McIlwain
- Grades: K–12
- Colors: Gold, maroon, and black
- Athletics: North Carolina Independent Schools Athletic Association (NCISAA)
- Team name: Mighty Warriors
- Website: www.mzcadurham.org

Mount Zion Christian Academy (MZCA) is a private, college preparatory, non-denominational, co-educational Christian day school (grades K–12) and boarding school (grades 9–12) located in Durham, North Carolina. The Academy is most noted for its successful prep basketball program. The prep program has produced many college players, International players and NBA players.

== Notable alumni ==
=== Basketball players ===
- Marquis Daniels, NBA player
- Cleanthony Early, professional basketball player
- Cory Hightower, NBA player
- Steven Hunter, NBA player
- Jarrett Jack, NBA player
- Tracy McGrady, seven-time NBA All-Star
- Kevin Obanor, professional basketball player
- Brandon Rush, NBA player, 2015 NBA champion with Golden State Warriors
- Amar'e Stoudemire, six-time NBA All-Star, now serves as player development assistant for the Brooklyn Nets
- Rodney White, professional basketball player
- Elijah Wilson, professional basketball player
