= 2020–21 South Dakota State Jackrabbits men's basketball team =

American college basketball season

2020–21 South Dakota State Jackrabbits men's basketball

Summit League regular season champions
- Conference: Summit League
- Record: 16–7 (9–3 The Summit)
- Head coach: Eric Henderson (2nd season)
- Associate head coach: Rob Klinkefus
- Assistant coaches: Bryan Petersen; Tramel Barnes
- Home arena: Frost Arena

2020–21 Summit League men's basketball standings
	Conf.				Overall
Team	W		L	PCT	W		L	PCT
South Dakota State	9	–	3	.750	16	–	7	.696
South Dakota	11	–	4	.733	14	–	11	.560
North Dakota State	11	–	5	.688	15	–	12	.556
Oral Roberts †	10	–	5	.667	18	–	11	.621
North Dakota	8	–	8	.500	9	–	17	.346
Kansas City	7	–	7	.500	11	–	13	.458
Western Illinois	5	–	9	.357	7	–	15	.318
Omaha	3	–	11	.214	5	–	20	.200
Denver	1	–	13	.071	2	–	19	.095
† 2021 Summit League Tournament winner

The 2020–21 South Dakota State Jackrabbits men's basketball team represented South Dakota State University in the 2020–21 NCAA Division I men's basketball season. The Jackrabbits, led by second-year head coach Eric Henderson, played their home games at Frost Arena in Brookings, South Dakota, as members of the Summit League.

== Previous season ==
The Jackrabbits finished the 2019–20 season 22–10, 13–3 in Summit League play to finish in a tie for the Summit League regular season championship. As the #2 seed in the Summit League tournament, they were upset in the quarterfinals by #7 seed Purdue Fort Wayne.

== Roster ==
2020–21 South Dakota State Jackrabbits men's basketball team
Players
Coaches

Pos.	#	Name	Height	Weight	Year	Previous school	Hometown
G	0	Cooper Cornemann	6 ft 2 in (1.88 m)	170 lb (77 kg)	Fr	Yankton High School	Yankton, South Dakota
G	1	Matt Mims	6 ft 0 in (1.83 m)	180 lb (82 kg)	So	Xavier High School	Cedar Rapids, Iowa
G	3	Baylor Scheierman	6 ft 6 in (1.98 m)	180 lb (82 kg)	So	Aurora High School	Aurora, Nebraska
G	4	Willie Mfum	6 ft 2 in (1.88 m)	205 lb (93 kg)	Fr	Spring Creek Academy	Columbus, Ohio
F	13	Luke Appel	6 ft 8 in (2.03 m)	235 lb (107 kg)	Jr	Kirkwood Community College	Marshalltown, Iowa
G	15	Noah Freidel	6 ft 4 in (1.93 m)	185 lb (84 kg)	So	Tea High School	Tea, South Dakota
F	22	Aaron Fiegen	6 ft 7 in (2.01 m)	215 lb (98 kg)	So	Madison High School	Madison, South Dakota
G	30	Charlie Easley	6 ft 2 in (1.88 m)	190 lb (86 kg)	So	Nebraska	Lincoln, Nebraska
F	32	Matt Dentlinger	6 ft 8 in (2.03 m)	240 lb (109 kg)	Jr	Kuemper Catholic High School	Arcadia, Iowa
G	34	Alex Arians	6 ft 4 in (1.93 m)	210 lb (95 kg)	Jr	Edgewood High School	Madison, Wisconsin
F	35	Douglas Wilson	6 ft 7 in (2.01 m)	210 lb (95 kg)	Sr	Kirkwood Community College	Des Moines, Iowa
G/F	50	David Wingett	6 ft 7 in (2.01 m)	205 lb (93 kg)	So	Memphis	Winnebago, Nebraska

Head coach

- Eric Henderson (Wayne State (NE))

Assistant coach(es)

- Rob Klinkefus (Buena Vista)
- Brian Petersen (Iowa State)
- Tramel Barnes (Southwest Minnesota State)

Legend

- (C) Team captain
- (S) Suspended
- (I) Ineligible
- (W) Walk-on
- Injured
- Current redshirt

Roster
Last update: December 4, 2020

== Schedule and results ==
Date time, TV	Rank^{#}	Opponent^{#}	Result	Record	Site (attendance) city, state
Non-conference regular season
November 25, 2020*; 6:00 pm, ESPN2		vs. No. 15 West Virginia; Crossover Classic quarterfinals	L 71–79	0–1	Sanford Pentagon (0); Sioux Falls, SD
November 26, 2020*; 6:30 pm, ESPN2		vs. Utah State; Crossover Classic consolation 2nd round	W 83–59	1–1	Sanford Pentagon (0); Sioux Falls, SD
November 27, 2020*; 5:30 pm, ESPN2		vs. Saint Mary's; Crossover Classic 5th place game	L 59–72	1–2	Sanford Pentagon (0); Sioux Falls, SD
December 2, 2020*; 6:00 pm, Big 12 Now		at Iowa State	W 71–68	2–2	Hilton Coliseum (0); Ames, IA
December 4, 2020*; 7:00 pm, ESPN3		at Bradley	W 88–84	3–2	Carver Arena (0); Peoria, IL
December 10, 2020*; 8:00 pm, MidcoSN2		vs. North Dakota State; Dakota Showcase	W 77–75	4–2	Sanford Pentagon (0); Sioux Falls, SD
December 11, 2020*; 5:30 pm, MidcoSN2		vs. North Dakota; Dakota Showcase	W 74–62	5–2	Sanford Pentagon (0); Sioux Falls, SD
December 12, 2020*; 8:00 pm, MidcoSN2		vs. South Dakota; Dakota Showcase	L 78–91	5–3	Sanford Pentagon (0); Sioux Falls, SD
January 4, 2021*; 6:00 pm		Mount Mary	W 93–50	6–3	Frost Arena (353); Brookings, SD
Summit League regular season
January 8, 2021; 7:30 pm		Western Illinois	W 83–77	7–3 (1–0)	Frost Arena (623); Brookings, SD
January 9, 2021; 7:30 pm		Western Illinois	W 92–63	8–3 (2–0)	Frost Arena (711); Brookings, SD
January 15, 2021; 7:00 pm		at Omaha	Canceled due to COVID-19 issues		Baxter Arena; Omaha, NE
January 16, 2021; 7:00 pm		at Omaha	Canceled due to COVID-19 issues		Baxter Arena; Omaha, NE
January 22, 2021; 7:30 pm, MidcoSN2		North Dakota	W 92–73	9–3 (3–0)	Frost Arena (787); Brookings, SD
January 23, 2021; 7:30 pm		North Dakota	W 85–74	10–3 (4–0)	Frost Arena (786); Brookings, SD
January 29, 2021; 8:00 pm		at Denver	Canceled due to COVID-19 issues		Hamilton Gymnasium; Denver, CO
January 30, 2021; 8:00 pm		at Denver	Canceled due to COVID-19 issues		Hamilton Gymnasium; Denver, CO
February 5, 2021; 7:30 pm, MidcoSN2		South Dakota	L 56–64	10–4 (4–1)	Frost Arena; Brookings, SD
February 6, 2021; 7:30 pm, MidcoSN2		South Dakota	W 89–78	11–4 (5–1)	Frost Arena; Brookings, SD
February 13, 2021; 7:00 pm		at Oral Roberts	L 86–103	11–5 (5–2)	Mabee Center; Tulsa, OK
February 14, 2021; 7:00 pm		at Oral Roberts	W 95–80	12–5 (6–2)	Mabee Center; Tulsa, OK
February 19, 2021; 7:30 pm, MidcoSN2		at North Dakota State	W 68–67	13–5 (7–2)	Scheels Center; Fargo, ND
February 20, 2021; 7:30 pm, MidcoSN2		at North Dakota State	L 82–84	13–6 (7–3)	Scheels Center; Fargo, ND
February 26, 2021; 7:30 pm, MidcoSN2		Kansas City	W 67–49	14–6 (8–3)	Frost Arena (798); Brookings, SD
February 27, 2021; 7:30 pm, MidcoSN2		Kansas City	W 89–77	15–6 (9–3)	Frost Arena; Brookings, SD
Summit League tournament
March 6, 2021; 5:45 pm, MidcoSN/ESPN+	(1)	vs. (8) Omaha; Quarterfinals	W 84–71	16–6	Sanford Pentagon; Sioux Falls, SD
March 8, 2021; 5:45 pm, MidcoSN/ESPN+	(1)	vs. (4) Oral Roberts; Semifinals	L 88–90	16–7	Sanford Pentagon; Sioux Falls, SD
*Non-conference game. ^{#}Rankings from AP Poll. (#) Tournament seedings in parentheses. All times are in Central.
