= Todd Lee =

American college basketball coach (born 1964)

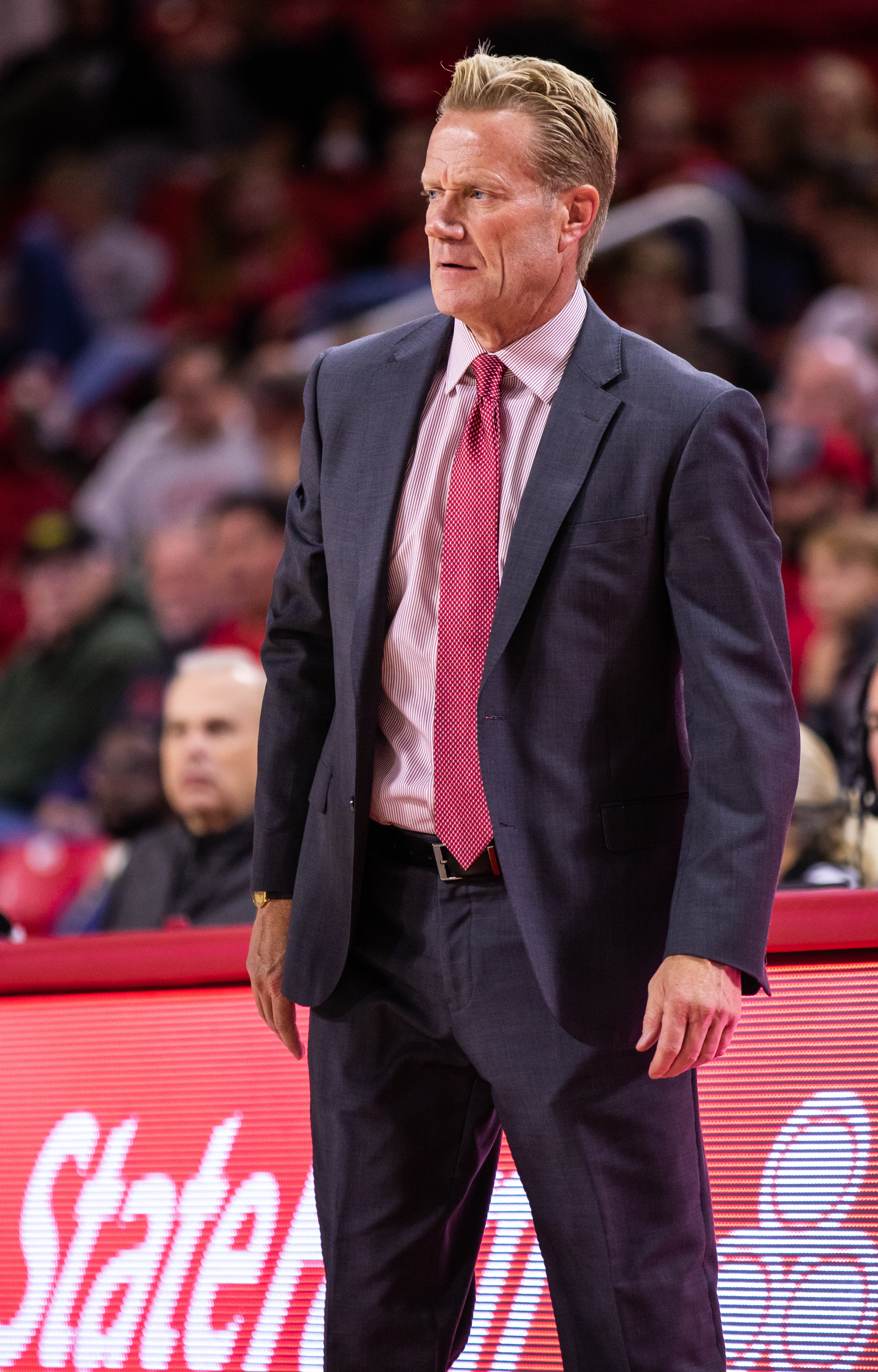
- Lee in 2019

Current position
- Title: Head coach
- Team: Cal State Bakersfield
- Conference: Big West

Biographical details
- Born: February 20, 1964 (age 62); Huron, South Dakota, U.S.
- Education: University of South Dakota ('86)

Coaching career (HC unless noted)
- 1986–1989: Southwestern CC (assistant)
- 1989–1992: San Diego (assistant)
- 1992–1994: Rapid City Thrillers (assistant)
- 1994–1997: Cal State Bakersfield (assistant)
- 1997–2005: UC Irvine (assistant)
- 2005–2013: Kentucky Wesleyan
- 2013–2018: Grand Canyon (assistant)
- 2018–2022: South Dakota
- 2023–2024: Arkansas (assistant)
- 2024–2026: USC (assistant)
- 2026–present: Cal State Bakersfield

Administrative career (AD unless noted)
- 2022–2023: Arkansas (director of scouting)

Head coaching record
- Overall: 220–133 (.623)
- Tournaments: 2–5 (NCAA Division II)

Accomplishments and honors

Awards
- Summit League Coach of the Year (2021)

Todd Walter Lee (born February 20, 1964) is an American college basketball coach who is the head coach at California State University, Bakersfield, a position he has held since 2026. He is the former head coach at the University of South Dakota. Lee served as an assistant at USC and the University of Arkansas under Eric Musselman.

== Coaching career ==
=== Assistant coach (1986–2005) ===
After graduating from the University of South Dakota in 1986, Lee's first coaching job was as an assistant coach at Southwestern College in California where he stayed until 1989 when he joined Hank Egan's staff at San Diego from 1989 to 1992. Lee then headed to the professional ranks for two seasons as an assistant coach for the Rapid City Thrillers of the CBA under Eric Musselman.

Lee returned to college coaching as an assistant coach under Pat Douglass at Cal State Bakersfield where he was on staff for the Roadrunners 1997 NCAA Division II national title winning squad. Lee followed Douglass to UC Irvine as an assistant coach and was on staff until 2005.

=== Kentucky Wesleyan (2005–2013) ===
On May 28, 2005, Lee became head coach at Kentucky Wesleyan, an NCAA Division II school. Inheriting a program with limited scholarships due to NCAA sanctions, Lee had only 20 wins in his first two seasons. However, in eight seasons at Kentucky Wesleyan, Lee went 154-81 with five straight NCAA Division II Tournament appearances from 2008 to 2012, advancing to the Sweet 16 round in 2012.

=== Grand Canyon assistant (2013–2018) ===
On April 9, 2013, Lee joined Dan Majerle's staff at Grand Canyon as the team transitioned to Division I.

=== South Dakota (2018–2022) ===
On April 4, 2018 Lee was named the 19th head coach in South Dakota history, replacing Craig Smith, who departed for the Utah State head coaching position. Following a second place finish in the Summit League for the 2020–21 season, Lee was named Summit League Coach of the Year. He was fired on March 10, 2022, despite finishing with a 66-52 mark in four seasons.

=== Arkansas (2022–2024) ===
After his release from South Dakota, Lee was hired by Arkansas head coach Eric Musselman in 2022 as an assistant coach and director of scouting.

=== USC (2024–2025) ===
Following the 2023–24 season, Lee followed Musselman to USC to serve as assistant coach.

=== Cal State Bakersfield (2026–present) ===
On March 26, 2026, Lee was named the head coach at California State University, Bakersfield. Regarding the selection, President Vernon Harper stated, "I am thrilled to announce that CSUB has selected the visionary leader and proven winner who will guide the Roadrunner men’s basketball team to a new era of excellence, integrity and pride. This is a proud day for our Athletics Program, the university and our community of supporters. Please join me in welcoming back Coach Lee and reminding him of the hospitality that makes Kern County the heart of California."

== Personal life ==
Lee grew up in Huron, South Dakota. He has three children; when he took the job at South Dakota in 2018, his wife and children stayed in Arizona.

== Head coaching record ==
Record table
Season	Team	Overall	Conference	Standing	Postseason
Kentucky Wesleyan Panthers (Great Lakes Valley Conference) (2005–2013)
2005–06	Kentucky Wesleyan	7–19	4–15	12th	
2006–07	Kentucky Wesleyan	13–14	6–13	12th	
2007–08	Kentucky Wesleyan	24–8	14–5	3rd	NCAA Division II First Round
2008–09	Kentucky Wesleyan	19–9	11–7	5th	NCAA Division II first round
2009–10	Kentucky Wesleyan	29–5	16–2	1st	NCAA Division II first round
2010–11	Kentucky Wesleyan	19–10	10–8	5th	NCAA Division II first round
2011–12	Kentucky Wesleyan	23–8	12–6	6th	NCAA Division II regional final
2012–13	Kentucky Wesleyan	20–8	11–7	7th	
Kentucky Wesleyan:		154–81 (.655)	84–63 (.571)		
South Dakota Coyotes (Summit League) (2018–2022)
2018–19	South Dakota	13–17	7–9	T–5th	
2019–20	South Dakota	20–12	10–6	3rd	
2020–21	South Dakota	14–11	11–4	2nd	
2021–22	South Dakota	19–12	11–7	5th	
South Dakota:		66–52 (.559)	39–26 (.600)		
Cal State Bakersfield Roadrunners (Big West Conference) (2026–present)
2026–27	Cal State Bakersfield	0–0	0–0	TBD	
Cal State Bakersfield:		0–0 (–)	0–0 (–)		
Total:		220–133 (.623)			
National champion Postseason invitational champion Conference regular season champion Conference regular season and conference tournament champion Division regular season champion Division regular season and conference tournament champion Conference tournament champion
