= Sanford Pentagon =

Multi-purpose arena in Sioux Falls, South Dakota

Coordinates: 43.593056°N 96.758611°W

- "The Pentagon"

- The Pentagon during the St. John's–Wisconsin game, November 2013

- Location within South Dakota Location within the United States
- Address: 2210 W. Pentagon Place
- Location: Sioux Falls, South Dakota
- Owner: Sanford Health
- Operator: Sanford Health
- Capacity: 3,250

Construction
- Groundbreaking: May 15, 2012
- Opened: September 2013
- Cost: $19 million
- Architect: JLG Architects

Tenant
- Sioux Falls Skyforce (NBAGL) (2013–present) Augustana Vikings (NSIC) (2019-present)

The Sanford Pentagon (colloquially known as The Pentagon) is an indoor arena located in Sioux Falls, South Dakota. The Pentagon opened in September 2013 and has a seating capacity of 3,250 spectators. It hosts the Sioux Falls Skyforce of the NBA G League. The facility is known for hosting a wide range of sporting events including: regional youth basketball tournaments, NCAA Division I basketball games, NCAA Division II basketball games and tournaments, mixed martial arts events, and occasional concerts.

== Major events ==
=== 2013 ===
The Pentagon's first major event was hosted on October 10, 2013. The Minnesota Timberwolves played the Milwaukee Bucks in the main court as a preseason exhibition game, and television coverage was provided by Fox Sports North. The Wolves defeated the Bucks by a score of 98–89 in front of an announced crowd of 3,250.

On November 8, 2013, the Pentagon hosted its first NCAA Division I men's basketball game between the then 20th ranked Wisconsin Badgers and the St. John's Red Storm. The game was televised on the Big Ten Network. Wisconsin won the game 86–75 in front of a sellout crowd of 3,523.

=== 2014 ===
On November 18, 2014, the Pentagon hosted an early season non-conference NCAA Division I basketball game between the then 11th ranked Wichita State Shockers and the Memphis Tigers. The game was televised by ESPN as part of their Tip-Off Marathon programming. The Shockers won that game 71–56 in front of a sellout crowd.

On November 30, 2014, the South Dakota State Jackrabbits took on the Florida Gulf Coast Eagles, winning 71–58. The announced attendance was 3,250 and coverage was provided by Fox Sports North.

For the third and final NCAA Division I basketball game of the 2014–15 season at the Sanford Pentagon, the UNLV Runnin' Rebels played the South Dakota Coyotes on December 13, 2014. UNLV won the game 75-61 and the game was televised by Midco Sports Network and ESPN3.

=== 2015 ===
On March 16, 2015, it was announced that the Iowa State Cyclones men's basketball team would play the Colorado Buffaloes men's basketball team on November 13, 2015, in an early season non-conference match-up.

=== 2020 ===
An early-season Division I basketball tournament—the Crossover Classic—was announced for the Pentagon in 2020. It served as a de facto replacement for the Battle 4 Atlantis tournament in Nassau, Bahamas, which was cancelled due to the COVID-19 pandemic. Most of the teams that were invited to said tournament were invited to the Crossover Classic, but only two would partake in the event.

The site was also home to the Dakota Showcase, which hosted all four Division I teams from the Dakotas. This included North Dakota, North Dakota State, South Dakota State, and South Dakota.

=== 2024 ===
On June 20, 2024, it was announced that the Pentagon would host an early-season showcase on November 4, 2024 (the opening day of the 2024–25 college basketball season), known as The Field of 68 Opening Day Showcase; presented by the podcast network The Field of 68, the event will feature a tripleheader of men's basketball games involving teams from mid-major conferences, including College of Charleston and Southern Illinois, McNeese State and South Dakota State, and Saint Louis and Santa Clara.

The Pentagon will also host pairs of games involving the Iowa Hawkeyes' and Nebraska Cornhuskers' men's and women's basketball teams; the Cornhuskers will play South Dakota and Saint Mary's women's and men's teams on November 16 and 17 respectively, the women's Hawkeyes will play Kansas on November 20, and the men's Hawkeyes will play Utah on December 21.

=== Annual/recurring ===
On December 11, 2013, it was announced that the Sanford Pentagon would be home to multiple NCAA Division II championships. These include the 2017 and 2018 NCAA Men's Division II Basketball Championships, the 2015, 2016, and 2018 NCAA Women's Division II Basketball Championships (except for the championship final in 2016, which will be held at Bankers Life Fieldhouse in Indianapolis), and the 2016 and 2020 NCAA Division II Women's Volleyball Championship. Beginning in 2018, it will also be the home to the NAIA Division II men's basketball championship.

Beginning in 2014, it is also home to the Northern Sun Intercollegiate Conference basketball tournament. The NSIC is an NCAA Division II conference with schools located mainly in Minnesota, South Dakota, and North Dakota.

=== List of NCAA Division I men's basketball games at Sanford Pentagon ===
Date	Winning team	Losing team	Event/Tournament
Nov. 8, 2013	Wisconsin 86	St. John's 75	
Nov. 18, 2014	#11 Wichita State 71	Memphis 56	
Nov. 30, 2014	Florida Gulf Coast 71	South Dakota State 58	
Dec. 13, 2014	UNLV 75	South Dakota 61	
Nov. 13, 2015	#7 Iowa State 68	Colorado 62	
Dec. 12, 2015	Oklahoma State 62	Minnesota 60	
Dec. 27, 2015	South Dakota State 65	Middle Tennessee 61	
Dec. 28, 2015	South Dakota 89	Florida Gulf Coast 81	
Nov. 25, 2016	East Tennessee State 86	Milwaukee 62	
Nov. 25, 2016	UC Irvine 63	South Dakota State 52	
Nov. 26, 2016	Milwaukee 54	UC Irvine 37	
Nov 26, 2016	East Tennessee State 71	South Dakota State 59	
Nov. 27, 2016	East Tennessee State 72	UC Irvine 66	
Nov. 27, 2016	South Dakota State 81	Milwaukee 58	
Dec. 3, 2016	Minnesota 56	Vanderbilt 52	
Nov. 24, 2017	Northern Colorado 80	Youngstown State 67	
Nov. 24, 2017	South Dakota 84	Southern Mississippi 71	
Nov. 25, 2017	Southern Mississippi 71	Youngstown State 64	
Nov. 25, 2017	Northern Colorado 63	South Dakota 62	
Nov. 26, 2017	Northern Colorado 77	Southern Mississippi 63	
Nov. 26, 2017	South Dakota 81	Youngstown State 53	
Dec. 2, 2017	Missouri State 73	South Dakota State 53	
Dec. 22, 2017	Iowa 80	Colorado 73	
Dec. 16, 2018	#25 Nebraska 79	Oklahoma State 56	
Feb. 7, 2019	Omaha 107*	South Dakota 102*	
Nov. 5, 2019	#20 St. Mary's 65*	Wisconsin 63*	
Nov. 9, 2019	Oklahoma 71	Minnesota 62	
Dec. 20, 2019	Northern Colorado 87	South Dakota 68	
Nov. 25, 2020	Memphis 73	Saint. Mary's 56	Bad Boy Mowers Crossover Classic
Nov. 25, 2020	Western Kentucky 93	Northern Iowa 87	Bad Boy Mowers Crossover Classic
Nov. 25, 2020	#15 West Virginia 79	South Dakota State 71	Bad Boy Mowers Crossover Classic
Nov. 25, 2020	VCU 85	Utah State 69	Bad Boy Mowers Crossover Classic
Nov. 26, 2020	Western Kentucky 93	Memphis 69	Bad Boy Mowers Crossover Classic
Nov. 26, 2020	#15 West Virginia 78	VCU 66	Bad Boy Mowers Crossover Classic
Nov. 26, 2020	Saint Mary's 66	Northern Iowa 64	Bad Boy Mowers Crossover Classic
Nov. 26, 2020	South Dakota State 65	Utah State 44	Bad Boy Mowers Crossover Classic
Nov. 27, 2020	#15 West Virginia 70	Western Kentucky 64	Bad Boy Mowers Crossover Classic
Nov. 27, 2020	Saint Mary's 72	South Dakota State 59	Bad Boy Mowers Crossover Classic
Nov. 27, 2020	Utah State 82	Northern Iowa 71	Bad Boy Mowers Crossover Classic
Nov. 27, 2020	VCU 70	Memphis 59	Bad Boy Mowers Crossover Classic
Dec. 10, 2020	North Dakota 75	South Dakota 71	Dakota Showcase
Dec. 10, 2020	South Dakota State 77	North Dakota State 75	Dakota Showcase
Dec. 11, 2020	South Dakota State 74	North Dakota 62	Dakota Showcase
Dec. 11, 2020	North Dakota State 74	South Dakota 67	Dakota Showcase
Dec. 12, 2020	North Dakota State 53	North Dakota 52	Dakota Showcase
Dec. 12, 2020	South Dakota 91	South Dakota State 78	Dakota Showcase
Dec. 19, 2020	#1 Gonzaga 99	#3 Iowa 88	
Mar. 6, 2021	South Dakota State 84	Omaha 71	2021 Summit League Basketball Championships
Mar. 6, 2021	South Dakota 86	Western Illinois 69	2021 Summit League Basketball Championships
Mar. 7, 2021	Oral Roberts 76	North Dakota 65	2021 Summit League Basketball Championships
Mar. 7, 2021	North Dakota State 69	Kansas City 65	2021 Summit League Basketball Championships
Mar. 8, 2021	Oral Roberts 90	South Dakota State 88	2021 Summit League Basketball Championships
Mar. 8, 2021	North Dakota State 79	South Dakota 75	2021 Summit League Basketball Championships
Mar. 9, 2021	Oral Roberts 75	North Dakota State 72	2021 Summit League Basketball Championships
Nov. 22, 2021	South Dakota State 102	Nevada 75	Crossover Classic
Nov. 22, 2021	Washington 77	George Mason 74	Crossover Classic
Nov. 23, 2021	Nevada 88	George Mason 69	Crossover Classic
Nov. 23, 2021	Washington 87	South Dakota State 76	Crossover Classic
Nov. 24, 2021	Nevada 81	Washington 62	Crossover Classic
Nov. 24, 2021	South Dakota State 80	George Mason 76	Crossover Classic
Dec. 11, 2021	Creighton 83	#24 BYU 71	
Dec. 18, 2021	Iowa 94	Utah State 75	
Nov. 15, 2022	South Dakota State 66	St. Bonaventure 62	
Dec. 2, 2022	#6 Baylor 64	#14 Gonzaga 63	Peacock Classic
Nov. 7, 2023	#20 Baylor 88	Auburn 82	
Nov. 10, 2023	South Dakota 100	UT-Rio Grande Valley 79	
Nov. 18, 2023	Nebraska 84	Oregon State 63	
Dec. 1, 2023	South Dakota State 61	Towson 48	
Dec. 17, 2023	Syracuse 83	Oregon 63	
Nov. 4, 2024	College of Charleston 90	Southern Illinois 80	Field of 68 Showcase
Nov. 4, 2024	Santa Clara 85	Saint Louis 78	Field of 68 Showcase
Nov. 4, 2024	South Dakota State 80	McNeese State 73	Field of 68 Showcase
Nov. 17, 2024	St. Mary's 77	Nebraska 74	
Dec. 21, 2024	Iowa 95	Utah 88	
Nov. 3, 2025	Murray State 85	Omaha 77	Field of 68 Showcase
Nov. 3, 2025	Drake 77	Northern Arizona 71	Field of 68 Showcase
Nov. 3, 2025	South Dakota State 75	Merrimack 66	Field of 68 Showcase
Nov. 10, 2025	Iowa State 96	Mississippi State 80	
Nov. 15, 2025	Nebraska 105	Oklahoma 99	
Nov. 22, 2025	San Francisco 77	Minnesota 65	
Dec. 15, 2025	Wyoming 87	South Dakota State 72	
Nov. 15, 2026	#25 Nebraska 102	Boise State 75	

=== List of NCAA Division I women's basketball games at Sanford Pentagon ===
Date	Winning team	Losing team	Event/Tournament
Nov. 21, 2013	Drake 89*	South Dakota 81*	
Nov. 11, 2016	South Dakota 75	SIU-Edwardsville 65	
Nov. 21, 2018	South Dakota 73	Wichita State 64	
Nov. 15, 2019	South Dakota State 77	Dakota Wesleyan 46	
Nov. 28, 2020	#1 South Carolina 81	South Dakota 71	Bad Boy Mower's Crossover Classic
Nov. 29, 2020	#1 South Carolina 79	#21 Gonzaga 72	Bad Boy Mower's Crossover Classic
Nov. 30, 2020	#21 Gonzaga 54	South Dakota 50	Bad Boy Mower's Crossover Classic
Mar. 6, 2021	Omaha 52	#21 South Dakota State 40	2021 Summit League Women's Basketball Championships
Mar. 6, 2021	South Dakota 89	Oral Roberts 66	2021 Summit League Women's Basketball Championships
Mar. 7, 2021	Western Illinois 60	Kansas City 59	2021 Summit League Women's Basketball Championships
Mar. 7, 2021	North Dakota State 79	Denver 67	2021 Summit League Women's Basketball Championships
Mar. 8, 2021	Omaha 69	Western Illinois 55	2021 Summit League Women's Basketball Championships
Mar. 8, 2021	South Dakota 81	North Dakota State 55	2021 Summit League Women's Basketball Championships
Mar. 9, 2021	South Dakota 66	Omaha 43	2021 Summit League Women's Basketball Championships
Nov. 12, 2021	#1 South Carolina 72	South Dakota 41	2021 Mammoth Sports Construction Invitational
Nov. 12, 2021	#22 Arizona 61*	#6 Louisville 59*	2021 Mammoth Sports Construction Invitational
Dec. 15, 2022	#1 South Carolina 62	South Dakota State 44	
Nov. 6, 2023	#22 Creighton 75	North Dakota State 52	
Nov. 25, 2023	South Dakota 72	South Carolina State 52	
Nov. 16, 2024	Nebraska 113	South Dakota 70	
Nov. 20, 2024	Iowa 71	Kansas 58	
Nov. 16, 2025	Nebraska 82	North Dakota State 70	
Nov. 20, 2025	South Dakota State 72	Gonzaga 63	
Nov. 14, 2026	Nebraska 105	Kansas 73	2026 MarketBeat Invintational
Nov. 14, 2026	Minnesota 68	Kansas State 65	2026 MarketBeat Invintational

=== Appearances ===
Number of App.	School	Record W/L	Notable Wins
19	South Dakota State	10-9	
13	South Dakota	6-7	
10	(W) South Dakota	6-4	2021 Summit League Women's Tournament Champions
6	North Dakota State	4-2	
5	Nebraska	4-1	
5	St. Mary's	4-1	
4	Northern Colorado	4-0	
4	(W) South Carolina	4-0	#21 Gonzaga
4	Iowa	3-1	
4	North Dakota	1-3	
4	Memphis	1-3	
3	(W) Nebraska	3-0	
3	E. Tennessee State	3-0	
3	West Virginia	3-0	2020 Bad Boy Mower's Crossover Classic Champions
3	Oral Roberts	3-0	2021 Summit League Men's Tournament Champions
3	Washington	2-1	
3	Nevada	2-1	
3	VCU	2-1	
3	Western Kentucky	2-1	
3	(W) Omaha	2-1	#21 South Dakota State
3	Milwaukee	1-2	
3	UC Irvine	1-2	
3	Southern Mississippi	1-2	
3	Utah State	1-2	
3	Minnesota	1-2	
3	(W) South Dakota State	1-2	
3	(W) North Dakota State	1-2	
3	Omaha	1-2	
3	George Mason	0-3	
3	Youngstown State	0-3	
2	Baylor	2-0	vs. #14 Gonzaga
2	Florida Gulf Coast	1-1	
2	Oklahoma State	1-1	
2	Gonzaga	1-1	vs. #3 Iowa
2	(W) Gonzaga	1-1	
2	(W) Western Illinois	1-1	
2	(W) Kansas	0-2	
2	Colorado	0-2	
1	(W) Minnesota	1-0	
1	Wisconsin	1-0	
1	Wichita State	1-0	
1	UNLV	1-0	
1	Iowa State	1-0	
1	Missouri State	1-0	
1	Creighton	1-0	vs. #24 BYU
1	Syracuse	1-0	
1	(W) Creighton	1-0	
1	(W) Arizona	1-0	#6 Louisville
1	St. John's	0-1	
1	Vanderbilt	0-1	
1	Oregon	0-1	
1	Middle Tennessee	0-1	
1	UT-Rio Grande Valley	0-1	
1	Oregon State	0-1	
1	St. Bonaventure	0-1	
1	BYU	0-1	
1	Kansas City	0-1	
1	Western Illinois	0-1	
1	Towson	0-1	
1	(W) Drake	0-1	
1	(W) SIU-Edwardsville	0-1	
1	(W) Wichita State	0-1	
1	(W) Dakota Wesleyan	0-1	
1	(W) Oral Roberts	0-1	
1	(W) Kansas City	0-1	
1	(W) Denver	0-1	
1	(W) Louisville	0-1	
1	(W) South Carolina State	0-1	
1	Utah	0-1	
1	Boise State	0-1	
1	(W) Kansas State	0-1	
