= 2021–22 Western Michigan Broncos men's basketball team =

American college basketball season

2021–22 Western Michigan Broncos men's basketball
- Conference: Mid-American Conference
- Record: 8–23 (4–16 MAC)
- Head coach: Clayton Bates (2nd season)
- Assistant coaches: Thomas Kelley; Kristof Kendrick; Jacob Bullock
- Home arena: University Arena

2021–22 Mid-American Conference men's basketball standings
	Conf.				Overall
Team	W		L	PCT	W		L	PCT
Toledo	17	–	3	.850	26	–	8	.765
Kent State	16	–	4	.800	23	–	11	.676
Ohio	14	–	6	.700	25	–	10	.714
Akron †	14	–	6	.700	24	–	10	.706
Buffalo	13	–	6	.684	19	–	11	.633
Ball State	9	–	10	.474	14	–	17	.452
Miami (OH)	8	–	12	.400	14	–	18	.438
Central Michigan	6	–	12	.333	7	–	23	.233
Bowling Green	6	–	14	.300	13	–	18	.419
Northern Illinois	6	–	14	.300	9	–	21	.300
Eastern Michigan	5	–	15	.250	10	–	21	.323
Western Michigan	4	–	16	.200	8	–	23	.258
† 2022 MAC tournament winner

The 2021–22 Western Michigan Broncos men's basketball team represented Western Michigan University in the 2021–22 NCAA Division I men's basketball season. The Broncos, led by second-year head coach Clayton Bates, played their home games at University Arena in Kalamazoo, Michigan as members of the Mid-American Conference (MAC). They finished the season 8–23, 4–16 in MAC play, to finish in last place. They failed to qualify for the MAC tournament.

On March 7, 2022, head coach Clayton Bates resigned after only two seasons. On April 5, the school named longtime Michigan State assistant Dwayne Stephens the team's new head coach.

== Previous season ==
In a season limited due to the ongoing COVID-19 pandemic, the Broncos finished the 2020–21 season 5–16, 4–12 in MAC play, to finish in ninth place. As a result, they failed to qualify for the MAC tournament.

== Offseason ==
=== Departures ===
Departures
Name	Number	Pos.	Height	Weight	Year	Hometown	Previous school
Chase Barrs	1	F	6'9"	210	Sophomore	Tampa, FL	Transferred to Florida A&M
William Boyer-Richard	20	G	6'1"	190	Junior	Drummondville, QC	Graduated; transferred to Brock University
Rafael Cruz Jr.	11	G	6'1"	185	Senior	Chicago, IL	Graduated
Patrick Emilien	15	F	6'6"	205	Junior	Toronto, ON	Transferred to St. Francis (NY)
Daylan Hamilton	4	G	6'3"	–	Freshman	Houston, TX	Transferred to Triton College
Jaylon Holmes	24	G	6'5"	–	RS Sophomore	Gary, IN	
Greg Lee	23	F	6'9"	–	Senior	Rockford, IL	Transferred to Penn State
Luke Toliver	10	G	6'3"	190	Junior	Paw Paw, MI	Transferred to Grand Valley State
Jason Whitens	30	G	6'4"	185	RS Junior	Powers, MI	Transferred to Michigan State
Kawanise Wilkins	0	F	6'5"	230	RS Junior	Chicago, IL	Graduated; transferred to Tarleton State

=== Incoming transfers ===
On April 28, 2021, the NCAA officially adopted a measure that would allow athletes in all sports to transfer once without sitting out a season beginning with the 2021–22 season.

Incoming transfers
Name	Number	Pos.	Height	Weight	Year	Hometown	Previous school
Markeese Hastings	0	F	6'7"	195	RS Sophomore	Wyoming, MI	Butler
Mileek McMillan	1	F	6'9"	225	Senior	Merrillville, IN	Valparaiso
Lamar Norman Jr.	11	G	6'1"	175	Junior	Grand Rapids, MI	Duquesne
Mack Smith	32	G	6'2"	210	Junior	Indianapolis, IN	Eastern Illinois

=== Recruiting class ===
==== 2021 recruiting class ====
College recruiting information
Name	Hometown	School	Height	Weight	Commit date
Gus Etchison; G	Arcadia, IN	Hamilton Heights High School	5 ft 11 in (1.80 m)	145 lb (66 kg)	Jul 16, 2019
Gus Etchison; G	Recruit ratings: Scout: Rivals: (NR)				
Shemani Fuller; F	The Bronx, NY	Woodstock Academy	6 ft 8 in (2.03 m)	N/A	Aug 19, 2021
Shemani Fuller; F	Recruit ratings: Scout: Rivals: (NR)				
Cameron Kimble; G	Las Vegas, NV	Clark High School	6 ft 5 in (1.96 m)	180 lb (82 kg)	May 25, 2021
Cameron Kimble; G	Recruit ratings: Scout: Rivals: (NR)				
Owen Lobsinger; F	Flint, MI	Flint Powers Catholic	6 ft 9 in (2.06 m)	225 lb (102 kg)	Jun 14, 2020
Owen Lobsinger; F	Recruit ratings: Scout: Rivals: (NR)				
Jack Stefanski; F	Frankfort, MI	Frankfort High School	6 ft 6 in (1.98 m)	205 lb (93 kg)	May 24, 2021
Jack Stefanski; F	Recruit ratings: Scout: Rivals: (NR)				
Overall recruit ranking:
Note: In many cases, Scout, Rivals, 247Sports, On3, and ESPN may conflict in their listings of height and weight.; In these cases, the average was taken. ESPN grades are on a 100-point scale.; Sources: "2021 Western Michigan Basketball Commits". Rivals.; "2021 Western Michigan Basketball Commits". Scout.; "2021 Western Michigan Basketball Commits". ESPN.; "Scout.com Team Recruiting Rankings". Scout.; "2021 Team Ranking". Rivals.

== Roster ==
2021–22 Western Michigan Broncos men's basketball team
Players
Coaches

Pos.	#	Name	Height	Weight	Year	Previous school	Hometown
F	0	Markeese Hastings	6 ft 7 in (2.01 m)	195 lb (88 kg)	RS So	Butler University	Wyoming, MI
F	1	Mileek McMillan	6 ft 9 in (2.06 m)	225 lb (102 kg)	Sr	Valparaiso University	Merrillville, IN
G	2	Adrian Martin	6 ft 3 in (1.91 m)	185 lb (84 kg)	Jr	Lanier High School	Sugar Hill, GA
G	3	B. Artis White	5 ft 10 in (1.78 m)	155 lb (70 kg)	So	Canton High School	Canton, MI
G	11	Lamar Jr. Norman	6 ft 1 in (1.85 m)	175 lb (79 kg)	Jr	Duquesne University	Grand Rapids, MI
G	12	Josiah Freeman	6 ft 3 in (1.91 m)	205 lb (93 kg)	Fr	Manassas Park High School	Manassas Park, VA
G	14	Cameron Kimble	6 ft 5 in (1.96 m)	180 lb (82 kg)	Fr	Clark High School	Las Vegas, NV
F	20	Owen Lobsinger	6 ft 9 in (2.06 m)	225 lb (102 kg)	Fr	Powers Catholic High School	Flint, Michigan
F	21	Gus Etchison	5 ft 11 in (1.8 m)	145 lb (66 kg)	Fr	Hamilton Heights High School	Arcadia, IN
C	22	Titus Wright	6 ft 8 in (2.03 m)	220 lb (100 kg)	So	Thomasville High School	Thomasville, GA
F	23	Shemani Fuller	6 ft 8 in (2.03 m)	—	Fr	Woodstock Academy	The Bronx, NY
G	32	Mack Smith	6 ft 2 in (1.88 m)	210 lb (95 kg)	Sr	Eastern Illinois University	Indianapolis, IN
F	33	Jack Stefanski	6 ft 6 in (1.98 m)	205 lb (93 kg)	Fr	Frankfort High School	Frankfort, MI
F	34	Danny Kolp	6 ft 9 in (2.06 m)	215 lb (98 kg)	Jr	Northwood University	Petoskey, MI

Head coach

- Clayton Bates (Florida)

Assistant coach(es)

- Thomas Kelley (Michigan State)
- Kristof Kendrick (Western Michigan)
- Jacob Bullock (Aquinas (MI))

Legend

- (C) Team captain
- (S) Suspended
- (I) Ineligible
- (W) Walk-on
- Injured
- Current redshirt

Roster
Last update: October 14, 2021

== Schedule and results ==
Date time, TV	Rank^{#}	Opponent^{#}	Result	Record	High points	High rebounds	High assists	Site (attendance) city, state
Exhibition
November 6, 2021*; 1:00 p.m.		Kalamazoo	W 77–47	–	16 – Etchison	6 – McMillan	3 – tied	University Arena (1,185); Kalamazoo, MI
Non-conference regular season
November 10, 2021*; 7:00 p.m., ESPN3		Hope	W 76–58	1–0	23 – Norman Jr.	10 – Hastings	3 – Norman Jr.	University Arena (1,442); Kalamazoo, MI
November 12, 2021*; 6:30 p.m., BTN		at Michigan State	L 46–90	1–1	13 – Smith	8 – Hastings	3 – Etchison	Breslin Center (14,797); East Lansing, MI
November 18, 2021*; 7:00 p.m., ESPN3/ESPN+		Saginaw Valley State	L 63–80	1–2	25 – Norman Jr.	7 – tied	5 – Martin	University Arena (1,208); Kalamazoo, MI
November 22, 2021*; 8:30 p.m., BTN		at Iowa	L 61–109	1–3	19 – Norman Jr.	7 – Wright	5 – Smith	Carver-Hawkeye Arena (10,044); Iowa City, IA
November 26, 2021*; 7:00 p.m., ESPN+		at Florida Gulf Coast; Hilton Garden Inn FGCU Invitational	L 67–77	1–4	24 – Norman Jr.	8 – Hastings	4 – Norman Jr.	Alico Arena (1,962); Fort Myers, FL
November 27, 2021*; 4:30 p.m.		vs. Purdue Fort Wayne; Hilton Garden Inn FGCU Invitational	W 93–85 ^{OT}	2–4	20 – Martin	8 – McMillan	5 – Smith	Alico Arena (212); Fort Myers, FL
November 28, 2021*; 1:30 p.m.		vs. Southeastern Louisiana; Hilton Garden Inn FGCU Invitational	W 81–77 ^{OT}	3–4	31 – Norman Jr.	12 – Hastings	3 – Martin	Alico Arena (212); Fort Myers, FL
December 5, 2021*; 2:00 p.m., ESPN3/ESPN+		Valparaiso	L 60–71	3–5	13 – Norman Jr.	9 – Smith	3 – Etchison	University Arena (1,883); Kalamazoo, MI
December 11, 2021*; 1:00 p.m.		Detroit Mercy	L 64–83	3–6	13 – Smith	9 – Wright	3 – Norman Jr.	University Arena (1,873); Kalamazoo, MI
December 17, 2021*; 7:00 p.m., ESPN3/ESPN+		Aquinas	W 67–56	4–6	17 – Norman Jr.	10 – Smith	2 – Martin	University Arena (1,408); Kalamazoo, MI
December 20, 2021*; 7:00 p.m., ACCN		at Notre Dame	L 52–85	4–7	15 – Norman Jr.	8 – Hastings	2 – Smith	Purcell Pavilion (4,903); South Bend, IN
MAC regular season
December 29, 2021; 7:00 p.m., ESPN3		at Toledo	L 56–83	4–8 (0–1)	10 – Norman Jr.	18 – Hastings	2 – Hastings	Savage Arena (4,028); Toledo, OH
January 1, 2022; 3:30 p.m., ESPN3		Ohio	L 47–59	4–9 (0–2)	21 – Norman Jr.	14 – Hastings	2 – Hastings	University Arena (1,353); Kalamazoo, MI
January 4, 2022; 7:00 p.m., ESPN+		Eastern Michigan	L 79–85	4–10 (0–3)	34 – Norman Jr.	11 – Wright	4 – Norman Jr.	University Arena (1,119); Kalamazoo, MI
January 11, 2022; 7:00 p.m., ESPN3		Buffalo	L 64–78	4–11 (0–4)	12 – Hastings	6 – Lobsinger	4 – Smith	University Arena (1,226); Kalamazoo, MI
January 15, 2022; 2:00 p.m., ESPN+		Miami (OH)	L 62–70	4–12 (0–5)	26 – Norman Jr.	9 – Hastings	3 – Freeman	University Arena (1,588); Kalamazoo, MI
January 18, 2022; 7:00 p.m., ESPN3		at Akron	L 73–74	4–13 (0–6)	23 – White	8 – Hastings	4 – Norman Jr.	James A. Rhodes Arena (1,611); Akron, OH
January 22, 2022; 2:00 p.m., ESPN3		Bowling Green	L 75–82	4–14 (0–7)	20 – Norman Jr.	13 – Hastings	4 – White	University Arena (1,462); Kalamazoo, MI
January 25, 2022; 7:00 p.m., ESPN3		at Kent State	L 64–75	4–15 (0–8)	22 – Norman Jr.	14 – Hastings	4 – Smith	MAC Center (2,134); Kent, OH
January 29, 2022; 3:30 p.m., ESPN3		at Ball State	L 72–83	4–16 (0–9)	22 – Norman Jr.	9 – Hastings	3 – White	Worthen Arena (3,786); Muncie, IN
February 1, 2022; 7:00 p.m., ESPN3		Northern Illinois	L 56–75	4–17 (0–10)	24 – Norman Jr.	12 – Hastings	3 – White	University Arena (1,217); Kalamazoo, MI
February 3, 2022; 7:00 p.m., ESPN3		at Central Michigan; Rescheduled from January 8	L 55–65	4–18 (0–11)	18 – Norman Jr.	10 – Hastings	1 – 4 tied	McGuirk Arena (1,700); Mount Pleasant, MI
February 5, 2022; 2:00 p.m., ESPN3		at Ohio	L 64–77	4–19 (0–12)	30 – Norman Jr.	10 – Hastings	3 – White	Convocation Center (7,588); Athens, OH
February 8, 2022; 7:00 p.m., ESPN3		at Miami (OH)	L 57–62	4–20 (0–13)	12 – Norman Jr.	8 – Hastings	2 – 2 tied	Millett Hall (1,285); Oxford, OH
February 12, 2022; 2:00 p.m., ESPN+		Central Michigan	W 77–63	5–20 (1–13)	25 – Norman Jr.	8 – Hastings	5 – Etchison	University Arena (2,072); Kalamazoo, MI
February 15, 2022; 7:00 p.m., ESPN3		Akron	W 61–57 ^{OT}	6–20 (2–13)	19 – Norman Jr.	11 – Hastings	4 – White	University Arena (1,269); Kalamazoo, MI
February 19, 2022; 3:30 p.m., ESPN3		at Buffalo	L 73–87	6–21 (2–14)	23 – Norman Jr.	8 – Hastings	4 – Etchison	Alumni Arena (4,666); Amherst, NY
February 22, 2022; 7:00 p.m., ESPN3		Toledo	L 50–92	6–22 (2–15)	9 – 2 tied	7 – 2 tied	3 – Hastings	University Arena (1,660); Kalamazoo, MI
February 26, 2022; 5:00 p.m., ESPN3		at Bowling Green	W 78–67	7–22 (3–15)	16 – Norman Jr.	9 – Hastings	3 – White	Stroh Center (2,825); Bowling Green, OH
March 1, 2022; 7:00 p.m., ESPN+		at Eastern Michigan	W 71–60	8–22 (4–15)	35 – Norman Jr.	7 – White	4 – White	George Gervin GameAbove Center (1,311); Ypsilanti, MI
March 4, 2022; 6:00 p.m., ESPN+		Ball State	L 63–64	8–23 (4–16)	16 – Smith	12 – Hastings	4 – Norman Jr.	University Arena (1,570); Kalamazoo, MI
*Non-conference game. ^{#}Rankings from AP poll. (#) Tournament seedings in parentheses. All times are in Eastern.
