= 2021–22 Mid-American Conference men's basketball season =

- League: NCAA Division I
- Sport: Basketball
- Teams: 12

Regular season
- Champions: Toledo
- Runners-up: Kent State
- Season MVP: Sincere Carry

Tournament

Mid-American men's basketball seasons
- 2020–21 2022–23

2021–22 Mid-American Conference men's basketball standings
	Conf.				Overall
Team	W		L	PCT	W		L	PCT
Toledo	17	–	3	.850	26	–	8	.765
Kent State	16	–	4	.800	23	–	11	.676
Ohio	14	–	6	.700	25	–	10	.714
Akron †	14	–	6	.700	24	–	10	.706
Buffalo	13	–	6	.684	19	–	11	.633
Ball State	9	–	10	.474	14	–	17	.452
Miami (OH)	8	–	12	.400	14	–	18	.438
Central Michigan	6	–	12	.333	7	–	23	.233
Bowling Green	6	–	14	.300	13	–	18	.419
Northern Illinois	6	–	14	.300	9	–	21	.300
Eastern Michigan	5	–	15	.250	10	–	21	.323
Western Michigan	4	–	16	.200	8	–	23	.258
† 2022 MAC tournament winner

The 2021–22 Mid-American Conference men's basketball season began with practices in October 2021, followed by the start of the 2021–22 NCAA Division I men's basketball season in November. Conference began in January 2021 and concluded in March 2022. Toledo won their second straight MAC regular season title with a 17–3 conference record.

Fourth seeded Akron defeated Kent State in the final of the MAC tournament. With the automatic bid, Akron was the only MAC schools to qualify for the NCAA tournament where they lost to UCLA in the first round. Toledo accepted a bid to the National Invitation Tournament where they lost to Dayton in the first round. Ohio accepted a bid to the College Basketball Invitational. Kent State accepted a bid to The Basketball Classic.

== Preseason awards ==
The preseason coaches' poll and league awards were announced by the league office on November 3, 2021.

=== Preseason men's basketball coaches poll ===
(First place votes in parentheses)

1. Buffalo (11) 143
2. Ohio 126
3. Toledo (1) 107
4. Kent State 98
5. Akron (2) 95
6. Bowling Green 93
7. Miami 92
8. Ball State 54
9. Western Michigan 44
10. Central Michigan 34
11. Eastern Michigan 29
12. Northern Illinois 21

MAC tournament champions: Buffalo (8), Bowling Green (1), Kent State (1), Miami (1), Toledo (1)

=== Honors ===
Honor	Recipient
Preseason All-MAC First Team	Daeqwon Plowden, Bowling Green
Preseason All-MAC First Team	Josh Mballa, Buffalo
Preseason All-MAC First Team	Jeenathan Williams, Buffalo
Preseason All-MAC First Team	Ben Vander Plas, Ohio
Preseason All-MAC First Team	Ryan Rollins, Toledo
Preseason All-MAC Second Team	K. J. Walton, Akron
Preseason All-MAC Second Team	Sincere Carry, Kent State
Preseason All-MAC Second Team	Dae Dae Grant, Miami
Preseason All-MAC Second Team	Jason Carter, Ohio
Preseason All-MAC Second Team	B. Artis White, Western Michigan

== Conference matrix ==
	Akron	Ball State	Bowling Green	Buffalo	Central Michigan	Eastern Michigan	Kent State	Miami (OH)	Northern Illinois	Ohio	Toledo	Western Michigan
vs. Akron	–	0–2	0–2	0–1	0–2	0–2	2–0	0–2	1–1	1–1	1–0	1–1
vs. Ball State	2–0	–	0–2	2–0	1–0	0–2	2–0	0–1	1–1	1–0	1–1	0–2
vs. Bowling Green	2–0	2–0	–	2–0	1–0	0–1	2–0	1–1	0–2	1–1	2–0	1–1
vs. Buffalo	1–0	0–2	0–2	–	0–1	0–2	1–1	1–1	0–2	1–0	2–0	0–2
vs. Central Michigan	2–0	0–1	0–1	1–0	–	2–0	1–1	1–1	0–1	2–0	2–0	1–1
vs. Eastern Michigan	2–0	2–0	1–0	2–0	0–2	–	2–0	1–1	1–1	2–0	1–0	1–1
vs. Kent State	0–2	0–2	0–2	1–1	1–1	0–2	–	0–1	1–1	1–1	0–2	0–1
vs. Miami (OH)	2–0	1–0	1–1	1–1	1–1	1–1	1–0	–	0–2	2–0	2–0	0–2
vs. Northern Illinois	1–1	1–1	2–0	2–0	1–0	1–1	1–1	2–0	–	1–1	2–0	0–1
vs. Ohio	1–1	0–1	1–1	0–1	0–2	0–2	1–1	0–2	1–1	–	2–0	0–2
vs. Toledo	0–1	1–1	0–2	0–2	0–2	0–1	2–0	0–2	0–2	0–2	−	0–2
vs. Western Michigan	1–1	2–0	1–1	2–0	1–1	1–1	1–0	2–0	1–0	2–0	2–0	-
Total	14–6	9–10	6–14	13–6	6–12	5–15	16–4	8–12	6–14	14–6	17–3	4–16

== All-MAC awards ==
=== Mid-American men's basketball weekly awards ===
Week	Player(s) of the Week	School	Newcomer of the Week	School
Nov 15	Mark Sears	Ohio		
Nov 22	Maceo Jack	Buffalo		
Nov 29	Ryan Rollins	Toledo		
Dec 6	Enrique Freeman	Akron		
Dec 13	Bryce McBride	Eastern Michigan		
Dec 20	Mark Sears	Ohio		
Dec 27	Mark Sears	Ohio		
Jan 3	Ali Ali / Mekhi Lairy	Akron / Miami		
Jan 10	Mark Sears	Ohio		
Jan 17	JT Shumate	Toledo		
Jan 24	Ryan Rollins	Toledo		
Jan 31	Mark Sears / Ryan Rollins	Ohio / Toledo		
Feb 7	Jason Carter	Ohio		
Feb 14	Ryan Rollins	Toledo		
Feb 21	Sincere Carry / Josh Mballa	Kent State / Buffalo		
Feb 28	Sincere Carry / Jeenathan Williams	Kent State / Buffalo		
Mar 7	Sincere Carry / Setric Millner Jr.	Kent State / Toledo		

== Postseason ==
=== Postseason awards ===
1. Coach of the Year: Rob Senderoff, Kent State
2. Player of the Year: Sincere Carry, Kent State
3. Freshman of the Year: Payton Sparks, Ball State
4. Defensive Player of the Year: Enrique Freeman, Akron
5. Sixth Man of the Year: Justyn Hamilton, Kent State

=== Honors ===
Honor	Recipient
Postseason All-MAC First Team	Jeenathan Williams, Buffalo
Postseason All-MAC First Team	Sincere Carry, Kent State
Postseason All-MAC First Team	Mark Sears, Ohio
Postseason All-MAC First Team	Ben Vander Plas, Ohio
Postseason All-MAC First Team	Ryan Rollins, Toledo
Postseason All-MAC Second Team	Ali Ali, Akron
Postseason All-MAC Second Team	Enrique Freeman, Akron
Postseason All-MAC Second Team	Josh Mballa, Buffalo
Postseason All-MAC Second Team	Ronaldo Segu, Buffalo
Postseason All-MAC Second Team	JT Shumate, Toledo
Postseason All-MAC Third Team	Payton Sparks, Ball State
Postseason All-MAC Third Team	Daeqwon Plowden, Bowling Green
Postseason All-MAC Third Team	Jason Carter, Ohio
Postseason All-MAC Third Team	Setric Millner Jr., Toledo
Postseason All-MAC Third Team	Lamar Norman Jr., Western Michigan
Postseason All-MAC Honorable Mention	Xavier Castaneda, Akron
Postseason All-MAC Honorable Mention	Kevin Miller, Central Michigan
Postseason All-MAC Honorable Mention	Malique Jacobs, Kent State
Postseason All-MAC Honorable Mention	Dae Dae Grant, Miami
Postseason All-MAC Honorable Mention	Keshawn Williams, Northern Illinois
All-MAC Freshman Team	Payton Sparks, Ball State
All-MAC Freshman Team	Jaylin Sellers, Ball State
All-MAC Freshman Team	Kevin Miller, Central Michigan
All-MAC Freshman Team	Mo Njie, Eastern Michigan
All-MAC Freshman Team	Ra’Heim Moss, Toledo
All-MAC Defensive Team	Enrique Freeman, Akron
All-MAC Defensive Team	Daeqwon Plowden, Bowling Green
All-MAC Defensive Team	Josh Mballa, Buffalo
All-MAC Defensive Team	Malique Jacobs, Kent State
All-MAC Defensive Team	Sincere Carry, Kent State

== See also ==
2021–22 Mid-American Conference women's basketball season
