= 2021–22 Ball State Cardinals men's basketball team =

American college basketball season

2021–22 Ball State Cardinals men's basketball
- Conference: Mid-American Conference
- Record: 14–17 (9–10 MAC)
- Head coach: James Whitford (9th season)
- Assistant coaches: Ben Botts (4th season); Linc Darner (1st season); Khristian Smith (1st season)
- Home arena: Worthen Arena

2021–22 Mid-American Conference men's basketball standings
	Conf.				Overall
Team	W		L	PCT	W		L	PCT
Toledo	17	–	3	.850	26	–	8	.765
Kent State	16	–	4	.800	23	–	11	.676
Ohio	14	–	6	.700	25	–	10	.714
Akron †	14	–	6	.700	24	–	10	.706
Buffalo	13	–	6	.684	19	–	11	.633
Ball State	9	–	10	.474	14	–	17	.452
Miami (OH)	8	–	12	.400	14	–	18	.438
Central Michigan	6	–	12	.333	7	–	23	.233
Bowling Green	6	–	14	.300	13	–	18	.419
Northern Illinois	6	–	14	.300	9	–	21	.300
Eastern Michigan	5	–	15	.250	10	–	21	.323
Western Michigan	4	–	16	.200	8	–	23	.258
† 2022 MAC tournament winner

The 2021–22 Ball State Cardinals men's basketball team represented Ball State University in the 2021–22 NCAA Division I men's basketball season. The Cardinals, led by ninth-year head coach James Whitford, played their home games at Worthen Arena in Muncie, IN as members of the Mid-American Conference. They finished the season 14–17, 9–10 in MAC play to finish in sixth place. They lost to Ohio in the quarterfinals of the MAC tournament.

On March 14, 2022, the school fired head coach James Whitford. On March 25, UCLA assistant coach Michael Lewis was named the team's new head coach.

== Previous season ==
In a season limited due to the ongoing COVID-19 pandemic, the Cardinals finished the 2020–21 season 7–11, 5–8 in MAC play to finish in a tie for eighth place. The Cardinals lost to Toledo in the quarterfinals of the MAC tournament.

== Offseason ==
=== Departures ===
Departures
Name	Pos.	Height	Weight	Year	Hometown	Notes
Jarron Coleman	G	6'5	205	Redshirt Sophomore	Indianapolis, IN	Transferred to Missouri
Ishmael El-Amin	G	6'3	180	Senior	Minneapolis, MN	Transferred to Rhode Island
Zach Gunn	F	6'6	210	Redshirt Senior	Fishers, IN	Transferred to IUPUI
Brachen Hazen	F	6'8	210	Redshirt Senior	Columbia City, IN	Transferred to Lipscomb
Chris Robinson	G	6'2	185	Sophomore	Indianapolis, IN	
K.J. Walton	G	6'3	200	Redshirt Senior	Indianapolis, IN	Transferred to Akron

=== Incoming transfers ===
Transfers
Name	Pos.	Height	Weight	Year	Hometown	Previous school
Tyler Cochran	G	6'2	220	Junior	Bolingbrook, IL	Northern Illinois
Demarius Jacobs	G	6'2	185	Senior	Chicago, IL	Saint Louis
Mickey Pearson Jr.	F	6'7	210	Junior	Lincoln, AL	TCU

=== Recruiting class ===
College recruiting information
Name	Hometown	School	Height	Weight	Commit date
Basheer Jihad; PF	Farmington Hills, MI	North Farmington High School	6 ft 8 in (2.03 m)	210 lb (95 kg)	Apr 14, 2021
Basheer Jihad; PF	Recruit ratings: Scout: Rivals: 247Sports: (NR)				
Jaylin Sellers; SG	Columbus, GA	George Washington Carver High School	6 ft 4 in (1.93 m)	175 lb (79 kg)	Nov 11, 2020
Jaylin Sellers; SG	Recruit ratings: Rivals: 247Sports: (NR)				
Payton Sparks; C	Winchester, IN	Winchester Community High School	6 ft 9 in (2.06 m)	240 lb (110 kg)	Jul 17, 2020
Payton Sparks; C	Recruit ratings: Rivals: 247Sports: (NR)				
Overall recruit ranking:
Note: In many cases, Scout, Rivals, 247Sports, On3, and ESPN may conflict in their listings of height and weight.; In these cases, the average was taken. ESPN grades are on a 100-point scale.; Sources: "2021 Team Ranking". Rivals.

== Roster ==
2021–22 Ball State Cardinals men's basketball team
Players
Coaches

Pos.	#	Name	Height	Weight	Year	Hometown
F	0	Miryne Thomas	6 ft 8 in (2.03 m)	200 lb (91 kg)	RS Sr	Cleveland, Ohio
G	1	Demarius Jacobs	6 ft 2 in (1.88 m)	185 lb (84 kg)	Sr	Chicago, Illinois
G	2	Luke Bumbalough	6 ft 1 in (1.85 m)	180 lb (82 kg)	Jr	New Castle, Indiana
G	3	Teemu Suokas	6 ft 2 in (1.88 m)	185 lb (84 kg)	So	Helsinki, Finland
G	4	Josh Bryan	6 ft 5 in (1.96 m)	185 lb (84 kg)	Jr	Muncie, Indiana
C	5	Payton Sparks	6 ft 9 in (2.06 m)	240 lb (109 kg)	Fr	Winchester, Indiana
F	11	Basheer Jihad	6 ft 9 in (2.06 m)	220 lb (100 kg)	Fr	Detroit, Michigan
G/F	12	Jaylin Sellers	6 ft 4 in (1.93 m)	180 lb (82 kg)	Fr	Columbus, Georgia
G	13	Kani Acree	6 ft 6 in (1.98 m)	185 lb (84 kg)	RS Jr	Carbondale, Illinois
F	14	Mickey Pearson Jr.	6 ft 7 in (2.01 m)	210 lb (95 kg)	Jr	Lincoln, Alabama
G	23	Tyler Cochran	6 ft 2 in (1.88 m)	220 lb (100 kg)	Jr	Bolingbrook, Illinois
G	24	Jalen Windham	6 ft 5 in (1.96 m)	180 lb (82 kg)	Jr	Indianapolis, Indiana
C	34	Ben Hendriks	6 ft 10 in (2.08 m)	215 lb (98 kg)	Jr	Mississauga, Ontario
C	44	Blake Huggins	6 ft 10 in (2.08 m)	245 lb (111 kg)	RS Sr	Union City, Tennessee

Head coach

- James Whitford (Wisconsin)

Assistant coach(es)

- Ben Botts (Purdue Fort Wayne)
- Linc Darner (Purdue)
- Khristian Smith (Indiana State)

Legend

- (C) Team captain
- (S) Suspended
- (I) Ineligible
- (W) Walk-on
- Injured
- Current redshirt

Roster
Last update: November 30, 2021

== Schedule and results ==
Date time, TV	Rank^{#}	Opponent^{#}	Result	Record	High points	High rebounds	High assists	Site (attendance) city, state
Exhibition
November 3, 2021*; 7:00 pm		Michigan Tech	L 69–70	0–0	13 – Cochran	7 – Cochran	5 – Cochran	Worthen Arena (1,721); Muncie, IN
Non-conference regular season
November 7, 2021*; 7:00 pm, ESPN+		at Georgia Southern	L 71–82	0–1	21 – Bumbalough	12 – Sparks	3 – Tied	Hanner Fieldhouse (2,654); Statesboro, GA
November 13, 2021*; 12:00 pm, ESPN+/ESPN3		Omaha	W 73–69	1–1	14 – Windham	6 – Tied	8 – Bumbalough	Worthen Arena (2,752); Muncie, IN
November 18, 2021*; 8:00 pm, CBS Sports		vs. FIU; Jersey Mike's Classic	L 60–73	1–2	14 – Jihad	6 – Bumbalough	4 – Tied	McArthur Center (205); St. Petersburg, FL
November 19, 2021*; 5:30 pm, CBS Sports		vs. Weber State; Jersey Mike's Classic	L 74–85	1–3	14 – Bumbalough	5 – Pearson	5 – Cochran	McArthur Center (375); St. Petersburg, FL
November 21, 2021*; 2:30 pm, CBS Sports		vs. UMass; Jersey Mike's Classic	W 89–86	2–3	22 – Cochran	8 – Tied	4 – Tied	McArthur Center (376); St. Petersburg, FL
November 27, 2021*; 7:00 pm, ESPN+/ESPN3		Indiana State	W 97–75	3–3	15 – Cochran	10 – Thomas	5 – Tied	Worthen Arena (3,017); Muncie, IN
December 1, 2021*; 7:00 pm, ESPN3		at Western Illinois	L 80–93	3–4	17 – Bumbalough	9 – Bumbalough	5 – Sparks	Western Hall (998); Macomb, IL
December 8, 2021*; 6:30 pm, FS1		at Xavier	L 50–96	3–5	10 – Tied	4 – Tied	2 – Tied	Cintas Center (9,865); Cincinnati, OH
December 12, 2021*; 1:00 pm, ESPN3		IU Kokomo	W 85–58	4–5	19 – Cochran	7 – Sparks	5 – Tied	Worthen Arena (2,881); Muncie, IN
December 18, 2021*; 4:00 pm, ESPN+		at Illinois State	L 64–85	4–6	14 – Cochran	7 – Cochran	3 – Jacobs	Redbird Arena (2,704); Normal, IL
December 21, 2021*; 7:00 pm, ESPN3		Eastern Illinois	W 75–55	5–6	16 – Sparks	10 – Cochran	6 – Cochran	Worthen Arena (3,279); Muncie, IN
MAC regular season
January 1, 2022; 6:00 pm, ESPN3		Bowling Green	W 81–80	6–6 (1–0)	21 – Bumbalough	14 – Thomas	4 – Bumbalough	Worthen Arena (2,160); Muncie, IN
January 4, 2022; 7:00 pm, ESPN3		at Kent State	L 65–66	6–7 (1–1)	23 – Cochran	9 – Tied	4 – Thomas	Worthen Arena; Muncie, IN
January 8, 2022; 3:30 pm, ESPN+		at Eastern Michigan	W 78–72	7–7 (2–1)	20 – Bumbalough	6 – Tied	4 – Jacobs	George Gervin GameAbove Center (2,242); Ypsilanti, MI
January 11, 2022; 7:00 pm, ESPN3		Akron	L 74–84	7–8 (2–2)	23 – Sparks	10 – Sparks	6 – Jacobs	James A. Rhodes Arena (1,815); Akron, OH
January 14, 2022; 6:00 pm, CBS Sports		Buffalo	L 68–74	7–9 (2–3)	28 – Cochran	16 – Sparks	2 – Tied	Worthen Arena (3,563); Muncie, IN
January 18, 2022; 7:00 pm, ESPN3		at Toledo	L 70–83	7–10 (2–4)	17 – Sparks	14 – Sparks	4 – Jacobs	Savage Arena (3,635); Toledo, OH
January 22, 2022; 7:00 pm, ESPN3		at Central Michigan	Postponed due to COVID-19 issues					McGuirk Arena; Mount Pleasant, MI
January 25, 2022; 7:00 pm, ESPN+		at Miami	W 81–64	8–10 (3–4)	26 – Thomas	8 – Thomas	5 – Cochran	Worthen Arena (2,739); Muncie, IN
January 27, 2022; 8:00 pm, ESPN3		at Northern Illinois; Rescheduled from December 29	W 74–67	9–10 (4–4)	17 – Cochran	8 – Sparks	4 – Bumbalough	Convocation Center (613); DeKalb, IL
January 29, 2022; 3:30 pm, ESPN3		Western Michigan	W 83–72	10–10 (5–4)	18 – Thomas	10 – Sparks	3 – Tied	Worthen Arena (3,786); Muncie, IN
February 1, 2022; 7:00 pm, ESPN+		at Ohio	L 63–87	10–11 (5–5)	17 – Windham	11 – Sparks	2 – Tied	Convocation Center (4,721); Athens, OH
February 5, 2022; 3:30 pm, ESPN+		Toledo	W 93–83	11–11 (6–5)	18 – Sparks	11 – Sparks	5 – Thomas	Worthen Arena (3,321); Muncie, IN
February 8, 2022; 7:00 pm, ESPN3		Central Michigan	L 85–89 ^{OT}	11–12 (6–6)	17 – Thomas	13 – Sparks	5 – Bumbalough	Worthen Arena (2,628); Muncie, IN
February 12, 2022; 2:00 pm, ESPN+		at Buffalo	L 74–80	11–13 (6–7)	19 – Sparks	12 – Sparks	8 – Cochran	Alumni Arena (3,014); Amherst, NY
February 15, 2022; 7:00 pm, ESPN+		Northern Illinois	L 58–64	11–14 (6–8)	16 – Sparks	10 – Cochran	2 – Tied	Worthen Arena (2,918); Muncie, IN
February 19, 2022; 5:00 pm, ESPN3		at Bowling Green	W 91–82	12–14 (7–8)	18 – Thomas	11 – Sparks	4 – Cochran	Stroh Center (1,928); Bowling Green, OH
February 22, 2022; 7:00 pm, ESPN3		Kent State	L 82–93	12–15 (7–9)	19 – Thomas	6 – Sparks	8 – Jacobs	MAC Center (2,221); Kent, OH
February 26, 2022; 3:30 pm, ESPN3		Eastern Michigan	W 75–64	13–15 (8–9)	17 – Sparks	10 – Sparks	3 – Thomas	Worthen Arena (4,576); Muncie, IN
March 1, 2022; 7:00 pm, ESPN3		Akron	L 60–79	13–16 (8–10)	18 – Cochran	10 – Cochran	3 – Bumbalough	Worthen Arena (3,003); Muncie, IN
March 4, 2022; 6:00 pm, ESPN+		at Western Michigan	W 64–63	14–16 (9–10)	16 – Sellers	10 – Sparks	3 – Sparks	University Arena (1,570); Kalamazoo, MI
MAC tournament
March 10, 2022; 5:30 p.m., ESPN+	(6)	vs. (3) Ohio; Quarterfinals	L 67–77	14–17	20 – Sparks	14 – Sparks	3 – Cochran	Rocket Mortgage FieldHouse; Cleveland, OH
*Non-conference game. ^{#}Rankings from AP Poll. (#) Tournament seedings in parentheses. All times are in Eastern Time.
