= 2021–22 Miami RedHawks men's basketball team =

American college basketball season

2021–22 Miami RedHawks men's basketball
- Conference: Mid-American Conference
- Record: 14–18 (8–12 MAC)
- Head coach: Jack Owens (5th season)
- Associate head coach: Jeff Rutter (5th season)
- Assistant coaches: J.R. Reynolds (5th season); Adam Hood (5th season)
- Home arena: Millett Hall

2021–22 Mid-American Conference men's basketball standings
	Conf.				Overall
Team	W		L	PCT	W		L	PCT
Toledo	17	–	3	.850	26	–	8	.765
Kent State	16	–	4	.800	23	–	11	.676
Ohio	14	–	6	.700	25	–	10	.714
Akron †	14	–	6	.700	24	–	10	.706
Buffalo	13	–	6	.684	19	–	11	.633
Ball State	9	–	10	.474	14	–	17	.452
Miami (OH)	8	–	12	.400	14	–	18	.438
Central Michigan	6	–	12	.333	7	–	23	.233
Bowling Green	6	–	14	.300	13	–	18	.419
Northern Illinois	6	–	14	.300	9	–	21	.300
Eastern Michigan	5	–	15	.250	10	–	21	.323
Western Michigan	4	–	16	.200	8	–	23	.258
† 2022 MAC tournament winner

The 2021–22 Miami RedHawks men's basketball team represented Miami University in the 2021–22 NCAA Division I men's basketball season. The RedHawks, led by fifth-year head coach Jack Owens, played their home games at Millett Hall in Oxford, Ohio as members of the Mid-American Conference (MAC). They finished the season 14–18, 8–12 in MAC play, to finish in seventh place. They lost in the quarterfinals of the MAC tournament to Kent State.

Following the season, the school parted ways with head coach Jack Owens. On April 1, 2022, the school named former Xavier head coach Travis Steele the team's new head coach.

== Previous season ==
In a season limited due to the ongoing COVID-19 pandemic, the RedHawks finished the 2020–21 season 12–11, 9–8 in MAC play, to finish in seventh place. In the MAC tournament, they were defeated by Buffalo in the quarterfinals.

== Roster ==
2021–22 Miami RedHawks men's basketball team
Players
Coaches

Pos.	#	Name	Height	Weight	Year	Hometown
F	0	Javin Etzler	6 ft 8 in (2.03 m)	215 lb (98 kg)	RS So	Convoy, OH
F	1	Kamari Williams	6 ft 7 in (2.01 m)	175 lb (79 kg)	So	Sandy Spring, MD
G	2	Mekhi Lairy	5 ft 8 in (1.73 m)	140 lb (64 kg)	Sr	Evansville, IN
G	3	Dae Dae Grant	6 ft 2 in (1.88 m)	185 lb (84 kg)	Jr	Lorain, OH
G	4	Isaiah Coleman-Lands	6 ft 0 in (1.83 m)	165 lb (75 kg)	RS Sr	Indianapolis, IN
F	5	Precious Ayah	6 ft 6 in (1.98 m)	240 lb (109 kg)	RS Sr	Bayelsa State, Nigeria
F	11	James Beck	6 ft 8 in (2.03 m)	215 lb (98 kg)	RS Sr	Grand Rapids, MI
F	13	Dalonte Brown	6 ft 7 in (2.01 m)	215 lb (98 kg)	Sr	Toledo, OH
F	14	Luka Eller	6 ft 7 in (2.01 m)	220 lb (100 kg)	So	Mentor, OH
F	15	Jackson Kenyon	6 ft 8 in (2.03 m)	215 lb (98 kg)	Jr	Deerfield, IL
C	21	Jackson Ames	6 ft 11 in (2.11 m)	255 lb (116 kg)	So	Batavia, OH
G	22	Myja White	6 ft 1 in (1.85 m)	185 lb (84 kg)	RS Jr	Terre Haute, IN
G	24	Marr Avance	6 ft 1 in (1.85 m)	178 lb (81 kg)	Fr	Indianapolis, IN
G	25	Wil Stevens	6 ft 5 in (1.96 m)	185 lb (84 kg)	Jr	Chicago, IL
G	30	Bryson Tatum	6 ft 4 in (1.93 m)	180 lb (82 kg)	So	Urbana, IL
F	33	Elijah McNamara	6 ft 9 in (2.06 m)	215 lb (98 kg)	Sr	Pickerington, OH
F	35	Curtis IV Harrison	6 ft 7 in (2.01 m)	225 lb (102 kg)	Fr	Cincinnati, OH

Head coach

- Jack Owens (Eastern Illinois)

Assistant coach(es)

- Jeff Rutter (Winona State)
- J.R. Reynolds (Eastern Illinois)
- Kenneth Lowe (Purdue)

Legend

- (C) Team captain
- (S) Suspended
- (I) Ineligible
- (W) Walk-on
- Injured
- Current redshirt

Roster
Last update: October 28, 2021

== Schedule and results ==
Date time, TV	Rank^{#}	Opponent^{#}	Result	Record	Site (attendance) city, state
Exhibition
November 4, 2021*; 7:00 p.m.		Capital	W 69–44		Millett Hall; Oxford, OH
Non-conference regular season
November 9, 2021*; 7:30 p.m., ACCNX		at Georgia Tech	W 72–69	1–0	McCamish Pavilion (4,221); Atlanta, GA
November 13, 2021*; 2:00 p.m., ESPN3		Lamar	W 104–75	2–0	Millett Hall (1,163); Oxford, OH
November 17, 2021*; 7:00 p.m., ESPN3		Stetson	W 80–65	3–0	Millett Hall (1,000); Oxford, OH
November 20, 2021*; 2:00 p.m., ESPN3		Heidelberg	W 90–45	4–0	Millett Hall (1,147); Oxford, OH
November 23, 2021*; 7:00 p.m., ESPN3		Defiance College	W 99–47	5–0	Millett Hall (859); Oxford, OH
November 27, 2021*; 3:00 p.m.		at Western Illinois	L 67–79	5–1	Western Hall (506); Macomb, IL
December 1, 2021*; 7:00 p.m., ESPN+		Cincinnati	L 58–59	5–2	Millett Hall (7,285); Oxford, OH
December 4, 2021*; 1:00 p.m., ESPN3		at Indiana State	L 68–69	5–3	Hulman Center (3,456); Terre Haute, IN
December 14, 2021*; 7:00 p.m., ACCNX		at Clemson	L 76–89	5–4	Littlejohn Coliseum (5,154); Clemson, SC
December 18, 2021*; 2:00 p.m., ESPN3		Bellarmine	L 66–77	5–5	Millett Hall (1,202); Oxford, OH
December 21, 2021*; 2:00 p.m., ESPN3		Spalding	W 80–56	6–5	Millett Hall (722); Oxford, OH
MAC regular season
December 29, 2021; 4:00 p.m., ESPN3		at Buffalo	W 91–81	7–5 (1–0)	Alumni Arena (2,221); Amherst, NY
January 8, 2022; 5:00 p.m., ESPN3		at Bowling Green; Rescheduled from January 4	L 83–87 ^{OT}	7–6 (1–1)	Stroh Center (2,179); Bowling Green, OH
January 11, 2022; 7:00 p.m., ESPN+		Toledo	L 72–75	7–7 (1–2)	Millett Hall (913); Oxford, OH
January 15, 2022; 2:00 p.m., ESPN+		at Western Michigan	W 70–62	8–7 (2–2)	University Arena (1,588); Kalamazoo, MI
January 18, 2022; 7:00 p.m., ESPN3		Ohio	L 63–86	8–8 (2–3)	Millett Hall (1,311); Oxford, OH
January 22, 2022; 3:30 p.m., ESPN3		Northern Illinois	W 85–82 ^{OT}	9–8 (3–3)	Millett Hall (1,214); Oxford, OH
January 25, 2022; 7:00 p.m., ESPN+		at Ball State	L 64–81	9–9 (3–4)	Worthen Arena (2,739); Muncie, IN
January 29, 2022; 3:00 p.m., ESPN3		at Eastern Michigan	L 75–85	9–10 (3–5)	George Gervin GameAbove Center (1,459); Ypsilanti, MI
February 1, 2022; 7:00 p.m., ESPN+		Kent State	L 65–78	9–11 (3–6)	Millett Hall (1,930); Oxford, OH
February 4, 2022; 6:30 p.m., ESPN3		at Akron	L 55–66	9–12 (3–7)	James A. Rhodes Arena (1,794); Akron, OH
February 6, 2022; 4:00 p.m., ESPN3		Akron; Rescheduled from January 8	L 59–71	9–13 (3–8)	Millett Hall (1,597); Oxford, OH
February 8, 2022; 7:00 p.m., ESPN3		Western Michigan	W 62–57	10–13 (4–8)	Millett Hall (1,285); Oxford, OH
February 12, 2022; 3:30 p.m., ESPN+		Bowling Green	W 94–78	11–13 (5–8)	Millett Hall (4,699); Oxford, OH
February 15, 2022; 7:00 p.m., ESPN3		at Ohio	L 78–91	11–14 (5–9)	Convocation Center (7,990); Athens, OH
February 19, 2022; 4:30 p.m., ESPN+		at Northern Illinois	W 78–75	12–14 (6–9)	Convocation Center (1,507); DeKalb, IL
February 22, 2022; 7:00 p.m., ESPN3		Buffalo	L 84–86	12–15 (6–10)	Millett Hall (1,798); Oxford, OH
February 24, 2022; 7:00 p.m., ESPN3		Central Michigan; Rescheduled from January 1	L 69–83	12–16 (6–11)	Millett Hall (1,221); Oxford, OH
February 26, 2022; 2:00 p.m., ESPN3		at Toledo	L 73–88	12–17 (6–12)	Savage Arena (5,539); Toledo, OH
March 1, 2022; 7:00 p.m., ESPN+		at Central Michigan	W 75–61	13–17 (7–12)	McGuirk Arena (1,229); Mount Pleasant, MI
March 4, 2022; 7:00 p.m., ESPN+		Eastern Michigan	W 76–63	14–17 (8–12)	Millett Hall (3,331); Oxford, OH
MAC tournament
March 10, 2022; 3:00 p.m., ESPN+	(7)	vs. (2) Kent State; Quarterfinals	L 75–85	14–18	Rocket Mortgage FieldHouse; Cleveland, OH
*Non-conference game. ^{#}Rankings from AP poll. (#) Tournament seedings in parentheses. All times are in Eastern.
