= 2021–22 Eastern Michigan Eagles men's basketball team =

American college basketball season

2021–22 Eastern Michigan Eagles men's basketball

Michigan MAC Trophy
- Conference: Mid-American Conference
- Record: 10–21 (5–15 MAC)
- Head coach: Stan Heath (1st season)
- Assistant coaches: Shawn Trice (1st season); Bob Simon (1st season); Drew Denisco (1st season)
- Home arena: George Gervin GameAbove Center

2021–22 Mid-American Conference men's basketball standings
	Conf.				Overall
Team	W		L	PCT	W		L	PCT
Toledo	17	–	3	.850	26	–	8	.765
Kent State	16	–	4	.800	23	–	11	.676
Ohio	14	–	6	.700	25	–	10	.714
Akron †	14	–	6	.700	24	–	10	.706
Buffalo	13	–	6	.684	19	–	11	.633
Ball State	9	–	10	.474	14	–	17	.452
Miami (OH)	8	–	12	.400	14	–	18	.438
Central Michigan	6	–	12	.333	7	–	23	.233
Bowling Green	6	–	14	.300	13	–	18	.419
Northern Illinois	6	–	14	.300	9	–	21	.300
Eastern Michigan	5	–	15	.250	10	–	21	.323
Western Michigan	4	–	16	.200	8	–	23	.258
† 2022 MAC tournament winner

The 2021–22 Eastern Michigan Eagles men's basketball team represented Eastern Michigan University during the 2021–22 NCAA Division I men's basketball season. The Eagles, led by first-year head coach Stan Heath, played their home games at the George Gervin GameAbove Center in Ypsilanti, Michigan as members of the Mid-American Conference (MAC).

The Eagles finished the season 10–21 and 5–15 in MAC play to finish in eleventh place. They failed to qualify for the MAC tournament. They won the Michigan MAC Trophy.

== Previous season ==
In a season limited due to the ongoing COVID-19 pandemic, the Eagles finished the 2020–21 season 6–12, 3–11 in conference play, to finish in 10th place in the MAC. They failed to qualify for the MAC tournament.

Following the season, the school announced it was parting ways with head coach Rob Murphy after ten seasons. On April 12, 2021, the school hired Eastern Michigan alum and former Kent State, Arkansas and South Florida head coach Stan Heath as the team's new head coach.

== Offseason ==
=== Departures ===
Departures
Name	Number	Pos.	Height	Weight	Year	Hometown	Previous school
Miles Gibson	2	G/F	6' 6"	195	RS Junior	Richmond, VA	Transferred to Metropolitan State
Ty Groce	1	F	6' 8"	215	RS Senior	Ypsilanti, MI	Graduated; Transferred to Butler
Chris James	13	G	6' 2"	170	Sophomore	Long Beach, CA	Transferred to College of Southern Idaho
James Love III	21	F	6' 11"	225	RS Senior	Fort Lauderdale, FL	Graduated
Drew Lowder	3	G	6' 0"	170	Sophomore	Jackson, MI	
Yeikson Montero	0	G	6' 5"	205	RS Senior	Santo Domingo, Dominican Republic	Graduated
Noah Morgan	5	G/F	6' 5"	180	Senior	Mount Vernon, NY	Graduated; Transferred to Morehouse College
Luis Pacheco	10	F	6' 8"	245	RS Freshman	Queens, NY	

=== Incoming transfers ===
On April 28, 2021, the NCAA officially adopted a measure that would allow athletes in all sports to transfer once without sitting out a season beginning with the 2021–22 season.

Incoming transfers
Name	Number	Pos.	Height	Weight	Year	Hometown	Previous school
Noah Farrakhan	5	G	6' 2"	165	Freshman	Newark, NJ	East Carolina
Colin Golson Jr.	1	F	6' 6"	230	Freshman	Detroit, MI	Siena
Yusuf Jihad	22	C	6' 8"	220	RS Freshman	Farmington Hills, MI	Oakland
Kevin-David Rice	0	G	6' 4"	200	Freshman	Flint, MI	Delta College
Monty Scott	2	G	6' 5"	200	Senior	Union, NJ	Portland State
Nate Scott	25	G	6' 8"	210	Senior	Naperville, IL	Northern Illinois

=== Recruiting class ===
==== 2021 recruiting class ====
College recruiting information
Name	Hometown	School	Height	Weight	Commit date
Malcolm Clements; G	Ypsilanti, MI	Arbor Preparatory High School	6 ft 3 in (1.91 m)	170 lb (77 kg)	04/27/2021 (verbal)
Malcolm Clements; G	Recruit ratings: Scout: Rivals: (NR)				
Prakash Ketterhagen; G	Kalamazoo, MI	New Rochelle High School	6 ft 5 in (1.96 m)	200 lb (91 kg)	09/13/2021 (verbal)
Prakash Ketterhagen; G	Recruit ratings: Scout: Rivals: (NR)				
Mo Njie; C	Centerville, OH	Centerville High School	6 ft 10 in (2.08 m)	245 lb (111 kg)	06/2/2021 (verbal)
Mo Njie; C	Recruit ratings: Scout: Rivals: (NR)				
Javantae Randle; F	Detroit, MI	Frederick Douglass Academy	6 ft 10 in (2.08 m)	210 lb (95 kg)	05/14/2021 (verbal)
Javantae Randle; F	Recruit ratings: Scout: Rivals: (NR)				
Luka Savicevic; G	Skopje, Macedonia	Sports Academy Skopje	6 ft 3 in (1.91 m)	150 lb (68 kg)	May 26, 2021
Luka Savicevic; G	Recruit ratings: Scout: Rivals: (NR)				
Overall recruit ranking:
Note: In many cases, Scout, Rivals, 247Sports, On3, and ESPN may conflict in their listings of height and weight.; In these cases, the average was taken. ESPN grades are on a 100-point scale.; Sources: "2021 Eastern Michigan Basketball Commits". Rivals.; "2021 Eastern Michigan Basketball Commits". Scout.; "2021 Eastern Michigan Basketball Commits". ESPN.; "Scout.com Team Recruiting Rankings". Scout.; "2021 Team Ranking". Rivals.

== Roster ==
2021–22 Eastern Michigan Eagles men's basketball team
Players
Coaches

Pos.	#	Name	Height	Weight	Year	Previous school	Hometown
G	0	Kevin-David Rice	6 ft 4 in (1.93 m)	200 lb (91 kg)	Fr	Delta College	Flint, MI
F	1	Colin Jr. Golson	6 ft 6 in (1.98 m)	230 lb (104 kg)	Fr	Sienna College	Detroit, MI
G	2	Monty Scott	6 ft 5 in (1.96 m)	200 lb (91 kg)	Sr	Portland State	Union, NJ
G	3	Luka Savicevic	6 ft 3 in (1.91 m)	150 lb (68 kg)	Fr	Sports Academy Skopje	Skopje, Macedonia
G	4	Bryce McBride	6 ft 2 in (1.88 m)	175 lb (79 kg)	Jr	Dyersburg State Community College	Jackson, TN
G	5	Noah Farrakhan	6 ft 2 in (1.88 m)	155 lb (70 kg)	Fr	The Patrick School	Newark, NJ
G	10	Darion Spottsville	6 ft 4 in (1.93 m)	205 lb (93 kg)	Sr	South Mountain Community College	Phoenix, AZ
G	12	Andrew Wells	6 ft 1 in (1.85 m)	160 lb (73 kg)	Fr	International Sports Academy	East Lansing, MI
C	13	Mo Njie	6 ft 10 in (2.08 m)	245 lb (111 kg)	Fr	Centerville High School	Centerville, OH
G	14	Malcolm Clements (W)	6 ft 3 in (1.91 m)	170 lb (77 kg)	Fr	Arbor Preparatory High School	Ypsilanti, MI
F	15	Axel Okongo	7 ft 0 in (2.13 m)	240 lb (109 kg)	Sr	Missouri	Saâcy-sur-Marne, France
C	22	Yusuf Jihad	6 ft 8 in (2.03 m)	220 lb (100 kg)	RS Fr	Oakland	Farmington Hills, MI
F	23	Thomas Binelli	6 ft 10 in (2.08 m)	240 lb (109 kg)	Sr	Monroe College	Bologna, Italy
G/F	25	Nate Scott	6 ft 8 in (2.03 m)	210 lb (95 kg)	Sr	Northern Illinois	Naperville, IL
F	33	Derek Jr. Ballard	6 ft 8 in (2.03 m)	225 lb (102 kg)	RS Jr	Southfield-Lathrup High School	Southfield, MI
F	35	Javantae Randle	6 ft 10 in (2.08 m)	210 lb (95 kg)	Fr	Frederick Douglass	Detroit, MI
G	45	Prakash Ketterhagen (W)	6 ft 5 in (1.96 m)	200 lb (91 kg)	Fr	New Rochelle High School	Kalamazoo, MI

Head coach

- Stan Heath (Eastern Michigan)

Assistant coach(es)

- Shawn Trice (Penn)
- Bob Simon (Eastern Michigan)
- Drew Denisco (Wittenberg)

Legend

- (C) Team captain
- (S) Suspended
- (I) Ineligible
- (W) Walk-on
- Injured
- Current redshirt

Roster

== Schedule and results ==
Date time, TV	Rank^{#}	Opponent^{#}	Result	Record	High points	High rebounds	High assists	Site (attendance) city, state
Exhibition
October 28, 2021*; 7:00 p.m., ESPN+		at Oakland; Charity Exhibition	W 74–69		27 – Farrakhan	7 – Farrakhan	6 – Farrakhan	Athletics Center O'rena (1,112); Rochester, MI
November 5, 2021*; 7:00 p.m.		Goshen	W 94–66		18 – tied	8 – tied	4 – Spottsville	George Gervin GameAbove Center (475); Ypsilanti, MI
Non-conference regular season
November 9, 2021*; 6:30 p.m., BTN		at Indiana	L 62–68	0–1	18 – Farrakhan	10 – N. Scott	3 – M. Scott	Simon Skjodt Assembly Hall (17,222); Bloomington, IN
November 12, 2021*; 6:00 p.m., ESPN3		Illinois State	W 103–98 ^{2OT}	1–1	28 – M. Scott	8 – McBride	4 – Farrakhan	George Gervin GameAbove Center (1,905); Ypsilanti, MI
November 18, 2021*; 7:00 p.m., ESPN+		at Northern Kentucky; Blue Demon Classic	L 73–74	1–2	21 – Farrakhan	7 – Njie	3 – Scott	BB&T Arena (2,220); Highland Heights, KY
November 20, 2021*; 5:00 p.m., BTN+		at Michigan State	L 59–83	1–3	13 – Farrakhan	8 – McBride	5 – Scott	Breslin Center (14,797); East Lansing, MI
November 24, 2021*; 3:00 p.m., ESPN3		Western Illinois; Blue Demon Classic	W 72–68	2–3	16 – Scott	7 – Scott	3 – Scott	George Gervin GameAbove Center (1,145); Ypsilanti, MI
November 28, 2021*; 2:00 p.m., FS1		at DePaul; Blue Demon Classic	L 63–101	2–4	18 – Scott	4 – Golson Jr.	3 – McBride	Wintrust Arena (2,194); Chicago, IL
December 2, 2021*; 10:00 p.m., ESPN+		at UC San Diego	L 74–83	2–5	16 – Golson	7 – N. Scott	4 – Savicevic	RIMAC Arena (838); San Diego, CA
December 5, 2021*; 4:00 p.m., ESPN3		Northwood	W 79–57	3–5	20 – Farrakhan	5 – tied	3 – M. Scott	George Gervin GameAbove Center (1,243); Ypsilanti, MI
December 8, 2021*; 7:00 p.m.		Niagara	W 60–58	4–5	19 – McBride	6 – Golson	4 – Farrakhan	George Gervin GameAbove Center (1,111); Ypsilanti, MI
December 11, 2021*; 1:00 p.m., ESPN+		FIU	W 92–88 ^{4OT}	5–5	27 – Farrakhan	11 – M. Scott	5 – N. Scott	George Gervin GameAbove Center (3,991); Ypsilanti, MI
December 20, 2021*; 7:00 p.m., ESPN3		at Valparaiso	L 55–67	5–6	17 – Farrakhan	8 – N. Scott	4 – M. Scott	Athletics–Recreation Center (1293); Valparaiso, IN
MAC regular season
January 4, 2022; 7:00 p.m., ESPN+		at Western Michigan; Michigan MAC Trophy	W 85–79	6–6 (1–0)	25 – Farrakhan	9 – Spottsville	4 – Farrakhan	University Arena (1,119); Kalamazoo, MI
January 8, 2022; 3:30 p.m., ESPN+		Ball State	L 72–78	6–7 (1–1)	16 – Golson	9 – N. Scott	3 – Spottsville	George Gervin GameAbove Center (2,242); Ypsilanti, MI
January 11, 2022; 7:00 p.m., ESPN3		Central Michigan; Michigan MAC Trophy	W 99–68	7–7 (2–1)	16 – McBride	7 – Nije	5 – Spottsville	George Gervin GameAbove Center (1,131); Ypsilanti, MI
January 15, 2022; 4:30 p.m., ESPN3		at Northern Illinois	L 70–77	7–8 (2–2)	27 – Farrakhan	5 – Spottsville	4 – Spottsville	Convocation Center (1,035); DeKalb, IL
January 18, 2022; 7:00 p.m., ESPN+		Kent State	L 47–56	7–9 (2–3)	20 – McBride	6 – Nije	2 – tied	George Gervin GameAbove Center (1,063); Ypsilanti, MI
January 22, 2022; 7:00 p.m., ESPN3		at Akron	L 44–46	7–10 (2–4)	14 – Golson	8 – N. Scott	3 – N. Scott	James A. Rhodes Arena (2,090); Akron, OH
January 25, 2022; 7:00 p.m., ESPN+		at Bowling Green	L 71–85	7–11 (2–5)	16 – Golson	6 – N. Scott	3 – McBride	Stroh Center (1,951); Bowling Green, OH
January 29, 2022; 3:00 p.m., ESPN3		Miami (OH)	W 85–75	8–11 (3–5)	28 – Farrakhan	10 – Scott	7 – Farrakhan	George Gervin GameAbove Center (1,459); Ypsilanti, MI
February 1, 2022; 7:00 p.m., ESPN3		Toledo	L 66–86	8–12 (3–6)	17 – Farrakhan	8 – Nije	4 – Farrakhan	George Gervin GameAbove Center (1,791); Ypsilanti, MI
February 3, 2022; 7:00 p.m., ESPN3		at Ohio; Rescheduled from December 28	L 68–81	8–13 (3–7)	16 – Scott	6 – Scott	4 – Farrakhan	Convocation Center (3,121); Athens, OH
February 5, 2022; 2:00 p.m., ESPN+		at Kent State	L 71–90	8–14 (3–8)	20 – Spottsville	7 – Scott	4 – McBride	MAC Center (1,943); Kent, OH
February 8, 2022; 7:00 p.m., ESPN3		at Buffalo	L 64–102	8–15 (3–9)	12 – McBride	4 – tied	3 – McBride	Alumni Arena (3,146); Buffalo, NY
February 12, 2022; 3:30 p.m., ESPN3		Ohio	L 56–74	8–16 (3–10)	12 – Spottsville	7 – Scott	2 – Scott	George Gervin GameAbove Center (1,208); Ypsilanti, MI
February 15, 2022; 7:00 p.m., ESPN+		at Central Michigan; Michigan MAC Trophy	W 75–70	9–16 (4–10)	24 – Farrakhan	5 – tied	4 – Farrakhan	McGuirk Arena (1,253); Mount Pleasant, MI
February 17, 2022; 12:00 p.m., ESPN3		Buffalo; Rescheduled from January 1	L 69–83	9–17 (4–11)	14 – Farrakhan	7 – tied	4 – Savicevic	George Gervin GameAbove Center (500); Ypsilanti, MI
February 19, 2022; 3:00 p.m., ESPN3		Akron	L 48–67	9–18 (4–12)	21 – Farrakhan	8 – Scott	2 – tied	George Gervin GameAbove Center (1,584); Ypsilanti, MI
February 22, 2022; 7:00 p.m., ESPN3		Northern Illinois	W 74–72	10–18 (5–12)	31 – Farrakhan	11 – Spottsville	7 – Scott	George Gervin GameAbove Center (1,294); Ypsilanti, MI
February 26, 2022; 3:30 p.m., ESPN3		at Ball State	L 64–75	10–19 (5–13)	27 – Farrakhan	8 – Scott	3 – Spottsville	Worthen Arena (4,576); Muncie, IN
March 1, 2022; 7:00 p.m., ESPN+		Western Michigan; Michigan MAC Trophy	L 60–71	10–20 (5–14)	12 – Rice	10 – Spottsville	5 – Spottsville	George Gervin GameAbove Center (1,311); Kalamazoo, MI
March 4, 2022; 3:00 p.m., ESPN+		at Miami (OH)	L 63–76	10–21 (5–15)	16 – Nije	10 – Nije	5 – Savicevic	Millett Hall (3,331); Oxford, OH
*Non-conference game. ^{#}Rankings from AP poll. (#) Tournament seedings in parentheses. All times are in Eastern.

== Awards ==
- Dec. 13, 2021 Bryce McBride (MAC Player of the Week)
- Mo Njie (MAC All-Freshman)
