= 2021–22 Buffalo Bulls men's basketball team =

American college basketball season

2021–22 Buffalo Bulls men's basketball
- Conference: Mid-American Conference
- Record: 19–11 (13–6 MAC)
- Head coach: Jim Whitesell (3rd season)
- Assistant coaches: Jamie Quarles (5th season); Angres Thorpe (3rd season); Brendan Foley (2nd season)
- Home arena: Alumni Arena

2021–22 Mid-American Conference men's basketball standings
	Conf.				Overall
Team	W		L	PCT	W		L	PCT
Toledo	17	–	3	.850	26	–	8	.765
Kent State	16	–	4	.800	23	–	11	.676
Ohio	14	–	6	.700	25	–	10	.714
Akron †	14	–	6	.700	24	–	10	.706
Buffalo	13	–	6	.684	19	–	11	.633
Ball State	9	–	10	.474	14	–	17	.452
Miami (OH)	8	–	12	.400	14	–	18	.438
Central Michigan	6	–	12	.333	7	–	23	.233
Bowling Green	6	–	14	.300	13	–	18	.419
Northern Illinois	6	–	14	.300	9	–	21	.300
Eastern Michigan	5	–	15	.250	10	–	21	.323
Western Michigan	4	–	16	.200	8	–	23	.258
† 2022 MAC tournament winner

The 2021–22 Buffalo Bulls men's basketball team represented the University at Buffalo in the 2021–22 NCAA Division I men's basketball season. The Bulls, led by third-year head coach Jim Whitesell, played their home games at Alumni Arena in Amherst, New York as members of the Mid-American Conference.

== Previous season ==
The Bulls finished the 2020–21 season 16–9, 12–5 in MAC play to finish in second place. In the MAC tournament, they defeated Miami (OH) in the first round, Akron in the quarterfinals, advancing to the championship game. In the title game, they lost to Ohio. They received an invitation to the NIT, where they would lose to Colorado State in the first round.

== Roster ==
2021–22 Buffalo Bulls men's basketball team
Players
Coaches

Pos.	#	Name	Height	Weight	Year	Previous school	Hometown
F	0	Kuluel Mading	6 ft 9 in (2.06 m)	202 lb (92 kg)	Fr	The Burlington School	High Point, NC
F	1	LaQuill Hardnett	6 ft 8 in (2.03 m)	205 lb (93 kg)	Jr	Cincinnati	Philadelphia, PA
G	2	Kidtrell Blocker	6 ft 5 in (1.96 m)	180 lb (82 kg)	Fr	Tennessee Prep	Rochester, NY
G	3	Curtis Jones	6 ft 5 in (1.96 m)	165 lb (75 kg)	Fr	Indian Hills CC	Minneapolis, MN
G	4	Keishawn Brewton	6 ft 2 in (1.88 m)	185 lb (84 kg)	RS Sr	Coastal Carolina	Spartanburg, SC
F	5	Zaakir Williamson	6 ft 7 in (2.01 m)	255 lb (116 kg)	Fr	Neumann Goretti HS	Philadelphia, PA
G	10	Ronaldo Segu	6 ft 0 in (1.83 m)	165 lb (75 kg)	Sr	Orlando Christian Prep	Orlando, FL
F	11	Jeenathan Williams	6 ft 5 in (1.96 m)	205 lb (93 kg)	Sr	Prolific Prep	Rochester, NY
G	20	Ty Perry	6 ft 3 in (1.91 m)	210 lb (95 kg)	Jr	Fordham	Boston, MA
F	21	Dominic Johnson	6 ft 5 in (1.96 m)	220 lb (100 kg)	GS	Catholic Central HS	Windsor, ON
F	22	Lucas Saleh	6 ft 6 in (1.98 m)	210 lb (95 kg)	Jr	Feather River College	Tiburon, CA
G	23	Jamon Bivens	6 ft 3 in (1.91 m)	190 lb (86 kg)	RS Sr	Fayette County HS	Atlanta, GA
F	24	Tra'Von Fagan	6 ft 8 in (2.03 m)	211 lb (96 kg)	GS	Florida SouthWestern State	Waterloo, IA
G	33	Maceo Jack	6 ft 5 in (1.96 m)	207 lb (94 kg)	Sr	George Washington	Amherst, NY
F	34	Josh Mballa	6 ft 7 in (2.01 m)	220 lb (100 kg)	Sr	Texas Tech	Bordeaux, France
C	41	Brock Bertram	6 ft 11 in (2.11 m)	244 lb (111 kg)	GS	Apple Valley HS	Apple Valley, MN
C	42	David Skogman	6 ft 10 in (2.08 m)	228 lb (103 kg)	RS So	Waukesha West HS	Waukesha, WI

Head coach

- Jim Whitesell (Luther)

Assistant coach(es)

- Jamie Quarles (Augusta)
- Angres Thorpe (St. Leo)
- Brendan Foley (Kansas State)

Legend

- (C) Team captain
- (S) Suspended
- (I) Ineligible
- (W) Walk-on
- Injured
- Current redshirt

Roster
Last update: January 9, 2022

== Schedule and results ==
Date time, TV	Rank^{#}	Opponent^{#}	Result	Record	High points	High rebounds	High assists	Site (attendance) city, state
Exhibition
November 4, 2021*; 7:30 pm, ESPN3		Medaille	W 105–54	–	19 – 2 Tied	10 – 2 Tied	5 – 2 Tied	Alumni Arena (2,143); Amherst, NY
Non-conference regular season
November 10, 2021*; 6:30 pm, BTN		at No. 6 Michigan	L 76–88	0–1	32 – Williams	8 – 2 Tied	4 – Segu	Crisler Center (12,707); Ann Arbor, MI
November 15, 2021*; 8:00 pm, ESPN+		at North Texas	W 69–66	1–1	18 – Jack	10 – Mballa	6 – Williams	The Super Pit (3,058); Denton, TX
November 20, 2021*; 2:00 pm, ESPN3		Rider; Cancún Challenge campus-site game	W 87–65	2–1	19 – Williams	7 – 2 Tied	6 – Jones	Alumni Arena (2,338); Amherst, NY
November 23, 2021*; 6:00 pm, CBSSN		vs. Stephen F. Austin; Cancún Challenge Riviera Semifinals	L 78–79	2–2	25 – Segu	9 – Mballa	4 – Segu	Hard Rock Hotel Riviera (103); Cancún, Mexico
November 24, 2021*; 6:00 pm, CBSSN		vs. Illinois State; Cancún Challenge Riviera Consolation	W 106–90	3–2	29 – Mballa	8 – Mballa	8 – Segu	Hard Rock Hotel Riviera (144); Cancún, Mexico
November 29, 2021*; 7:00 pm, ESPN3		Point Park	W 94–49	4–2	19 – Mballa	12 – Mballa	7 – Segu	Alumni Arena (1,702); Amherst, NY
December 4, 2021*; 4:00 pm, NBCSN Digital		at St. Bonaventure	L 65–68	4–3	23 – Williams	7 – Fagan	4 – Segu	Reilly Center (4,860); St. Bonaventure, NY
December 8, 2021*; 8:00 pm, ESPN+		at Western Kentucky	W 77–67	5–3	19 – Mballa	9 – Mballa	7 – Segu	E. A. Diddle Arena (3,689); Bowling Green, KY
December 11, 2021*; 1:00 pm, ESPN3		St. John Fisher	W 100–58	6–3	18 – Mballa	7 – Mballa	4 – Jack	Alumni Arena (1,682); Amherst, NY
December 18, 2021*; 5:00 pm, GoGriffs.com		vs. Canisius	L 64–65	6–4	13 – Williams	14 – Williams	5 – Segu	KeyBank Center (3,686); Buffalo, NY
December 21, 2021*; 7:00 pm, ESPN3		UC Irvine	Postponed due to COVID-19 protocols at UC Irvine					Alumni Arena; Amherst, NY
MAC regular season
December 29, 2021; 4:00 pm, ESPN3		Miami (OH)	L 81–91	6–5 (0–1)	26 – Mballa	17 – Mballa	7 – Segu	Alumni Arena (2,221); Amherst, NY
January 1, 2022; 2:00 pm, ESPN+		at Akron	L 76–88	6–6 (0–2)	19 – 2 Tied	5 – Williams	4 – 2 Tied	James A. Rhodes Arena (1,510); Akron, OH
January 5, 2022; 7:00 pm, ESPN3		Bowling Green	W 99–88	7–6 (1–2)	21 – Williams	15 – Skogman	7 – Segu	Alumni Arena (1,301); Amherst, NY
January 11, 2022; 7:00 pm, ESPN3		at Western Michigan	W 78–64	8–6 (2–2)	17 – Segu	11 – Skogman	3 – Jones	University Arena (1,226); Kalamazoo, MI
January 14, 2022; 6:00 pm, CBSSN		at Ball State	W 74–68	9–6 (3–2)	20 – Williams	11 – Skogman	7 – Segu	Worthen Arena (3,563); Muncie, IN
January 18, 2022; 7:00 pm, ESPN+		Central Michigan	Postponed due COVID-19 issues					Alumni Arena; Amherst, NY
January 21, 2022; 8:00 pm, CBSSN		Kent State	W 64–51	10–6 (4–2)	25 – Williams	11 – Williams	6 – Williams	Alumni Arena (2,056); Amherst, NY
January 25, 2022; 7:00 pm, ESPN+		at Toledo	L 75–86	10–7 (4–3)	24 – Williams	13 – Mballa	3 – Skogman	Savage Arena (3,927); Toledo, OH
January 28, 2022; 7:00 pm, ESPNU		Ohio	L 53–74	10–8 (4–4)	13 – Williams	7 – Williams	2 – Jack	Alumni Arena (2,131); Amherst, NY
February 5, 2022; 7:00 pm, ESPN3		at Central Michigan	W 74–54	11–8 (5–4)	19 – Williams	9 – Jack	5 – Williams	McGuirk Arena (1,933); Mount Pleasant, MI
February 8, 2022; 7:00 pm, ESPN3		Eastern Michigan	W 102–64	12–8 (6–4)	22 – Jack	9 – Jack	9 – Segu	Alumni Arena (3,146); Amherst, NY
February 12, 2022; 2:00 pm, ESPN+		Ball State	W 80–74	13–8 (7–4)	24 – Williams	13 – Skogman	6 – Segu	Alumni Arena (3,014); Amherst, NY
February 15, 2022; 7:00 pm, ESPN+		at Bowling Green	W 112–85	14–8 (8–4)	20 – Mballa	11 – Mballa	6 – Segu	Stroh Center (1,910); Bowling Green, OH
February 17, 2022; 12:00 pm, ESPN3		at Eastern Michigan; Rescheduled from January 1	W 83–69	15–8 (9–4)	19 – Mballa	13 – Mballa	3 – Williams	George Gervin GameAbove Center (500); Ypsilanti, MI
February 19, 2022; 4:00 pm, ESPN3		Western Michigan	W 87–73	16–8 (10–4)	24 – Williams	9 – Mballa	6 – Segu	Alumni Arena (4,666); Amherst, NY
February 22, 2022; 7:00 pm, ESPN3		at Miami (OH)	W 86–84	17–8 (11–4)	23 – Mballa	17 – Mballa	9 – Segu	Millett Hall (1,798); Oxford, OH
February 24, 2022; 8:00 pm, ESPN3		at Northern Illinois; Rescheduled from January 4	W 79–68	18–8 (12–4)	28 – Williams	9 – Skogman	6 – Segu	Convocation Center (521); DeKalb, IL
February 26, 2022; 2:00 pm, ESPN3		Northern Illinois	W 70–60	19–8 (13–4)	18 – Williams	15 – Mballa	4 – Williams	Alumni Arena (4,990); Amherst, NY
March 1, 2022; 7:00 pm, ESPN3		Toledo	L 76–92	19–9 (13–5)	20 – Segu	10 – Mballa	5 – Segu	Alumni Arena (5,470); Amherst, NY
March 4, 2022; 7:00 pm, ESPN+		at Kent State	L 65–70	19–10 (13–6)	20 – Sincere	10 – Mballa	9 – Sincere	MAC Center (4,283); Kent, OH
MAC Tournament
March 10, 2022; 1:30 pm, ESPN+	(5)	vs. (4) Akron; Quarterfinals	L 68–70	19–11	17 – Williams	8 – Skogman	4 – Williams	Rocket Mortgage FieldHouse; Cleveland, OH
*Non-conference game. ^{#}Rankings from AP Poll. (#) Tournament seedings in parentheses. All times are in Eastern.
