= 2021–22 Central Michigan Chippewas men's basketball team =

American college basketball season

2021–22 Central Michigan Chippewas men's basketball
- Conference: Mid-American Conference
- Record: 7–23 (6–12 MAC)
- Head coach: Tony Barbee (1st season)
- Assistant coaches: Shane Heirman (1st season); Marlon Williamson (1st season); Chris McMillian (1st season)
- Home arena: McGuirk Arena

2021–22 Mid-American Conference men's basketball standings
	Conf.				Overall
Team	W		L	PCT	W		L	PCT
Toledo	17	–	3	.850	26	–	8	.765
Kent State	16	–	4	.800	23	–	11	.676
Ohio	14	–	6	.700	25	–	10	.714
Akron †	14	–	6	.700	24	–	10	.706
Buffalo	13	–	6	.684	19	–	11	.633
Ball State	9	–	10	.474	14	–	17	.452
Miami (OH)	8	–	12	.400	14	–	18	.438
Central Michigan	6	–	12	.333	7	–	23	.233
Bowling Green	6	–	14	.300	13	–	18	.419
Northern Illinois	6	–	14	.300	9	–	21	.300
Eastern Michigan	5	–	15	.250	10	–	21	.323
Western Michigan	4	–	16	.200	8	–	23	.258
† 2022 MAC tournament winner

The 2021–22 Central Michigan Chippewas men's basketball team represented Central Michigan University in the 2021–22 NCAA Division I men's basketball season. The Chippewas, led by new head coach Tony Barbee, played their home games at McGuirk Arena in Mount Pleasant, Michigan as members of the Mid-American Conference.

== Previous season ==
The Chippewas finished the season 7–16, 3–13 in MAC play to finish in 11th place. They failed to qualify for the MAC tournament.

Following the season, fired head coach, Keno Davis, after nine years.

== Offseason ==
=== Departures ===
Departures
Name	Pos.	Height	Weight	Year	Hometown	Notes
Matt Beachler	G	6'4	200	RS Junior	Lowell, MI	Graduated
Travon Broadway Jr.	G	6'5	182	Senior	Miami, FL	Graduated, playing overseas for KK Kožuv
Preston Enloe	G	6'3	190	RS Junior	Plano, TX	Graduated
Tyler Hankins	F	6'9	225	Senior	Bartlett, IL	Graduated
Caleb Huffman	G	6'4	185	Junior	Broken Arrow, OK	Transferred to Nicholls
Devontae Lane	G	6'3	205	Senior	Iowa City, IA	Graduated
PJ Mitchell	G	6'0	188	RS Sophomore	Detroit, MI	Transferred to Fort Valley State
Malik Muhammad	F	6'9	235	Junior	Los Angeles, CA	Transferred to Southern Utah
Meikkel Murray	G	6'6	190	Junior	Bronx, NY	
Ra'Shad Weekly-McDaniels	G	6'1	215	Freshman	St. Louis, MO	Transferred to Moberly Area Community College

=== Incoming transfers ===
Transfers
Name	Pos.	Height	Weight	Year	Hometown	Previous school
Cameron Healy	G	6'3	190	Graduate Student	Sydney, Australia	Albany
Harrison Henderson	F	6'11	240	Graduate Student	Dallas, TX	Southern
Jermaine Jackson Jr.	G	6'0	175	Graduate Student	Detroit, MI	LIU
Oscar Lopez Jr.	G	6'4	200	Junior	Cypress, CA	DePaul
Rastislav Sipkovsky	F	6'5	210	Sophomore	Sereď, Slovakia	Hartford
Miroslav Stafl	F	6'11	235	Junior	Liberec, Czech Republic	Hartford
Brian Taylor	G/F	6'6	205	Junior	Detroit, MI	UIC
Ryan Wade	G	6'2	185	Junior	Ann Arbor, MI	Holy Cross

=== 2021 recruiting class ===
College recruiting information
Name	Hometown	School	Height	Weight	Commit date
Tony Green; SG	Naples, Florida	Naples High School	6 ft 6 in (1.98 m)	180 lb (82 kg)	
Tony Green; SG	Recruit ratings: Scout: Rivals: (NR)				
Kevin Miller; PG	Chicago, Illinois	Victory Rock Prep	6 ft 0 in (1.83 m)	165 lb (75 kg)	
Kevin Miller; PG	Recruit ratings: Scout: Rivals: (NR)				
Nicolas Pavrette; C	Lyon, France	Central Pointe Christian Academy	6 ft 11 in (2.11 m)	210 lb (95 kg)	
Nicolas Pavrette; C	Recruit ratings: Scout: Rivals: (NR)				
Jack Webb; SG	Shawnee Mission, Kansas	Shawnee Mission South High School	6 ft 4 in (1.93 m)	195 lb (88 kg)	
Jack Webb; SG	Recruit ratings: Scout: Rivals: (NR)				
Overall recruit ranking:
Note: In many cases, Scout, Rivals, 247Sports, On3, and ESPN may conflict in their listings of height and weight.; In these cases, the average was taken. ESPN grades are on a 100-point scale.; Sources: "2021 Team Ranking". Rivals.

== Roster ==
2021–22 Central Michigan Chippewas men's basketball team
Players
Coaches

Pos.	#	Name	Height	Weight	Year	Hometown
G/F	0	Brian Taylor	6 ft 6 in (1.98 m)	205 lb (93 kg)	Jr	Detroit, Michigan
F	1	Ralph Bissainthe	6 ft 7 in (2.01 m)	205 lb (93 kg)	RS Sr	North Miami, Florida
G	2	Boopie Miller	6 ft 0 in (1.83 m)	165 lb (75 kg)	Fr	Chicago, Illinois
F	3	Harrison Henderson	6 ft 11 in (2.11 m)	240 lb (109 kg)	GS	Dallas, Texas
G	4	Ryan Wade	6 ft 2 in (1.88 m)	185 lb (84 kg)	Jr	Ann Arbor, Michigan
G	5	Jack Webb (W)	6 ft 4 in (1.93 m)	195 lb (88 kg)	Fr	Leawood, Kansas
G	10	Jermaine Jackson Jr.	6 ft 0 in (1.83 m)	175 lb (79 kg)	GS	Detroit, Michigan
G	11	Cameron Healy	6 ft 3 in (1.91 m)	190 lb (86 kg)	GS	Sydney, Australia
F	12	Miroslav Stafl	6 ft 11 in (2.11 m)	235 lb (107 kg)	Jr	Liberec, Czech Republic
F	14	Rastislav Sipkovsky	6 ft 5 in (1.96 m)	210 lb (95 kg)	So	Sereď, Slovakia
F	15	Aundre Polk	6 ft 10 in (2.08 m)	210 lb (95 kg)	So	Detroit, Michigan
C	22	Nicholas Pavrette	6 ft 12 in (2.13 m)	210 lb (95 kg)	Fr	Lyon, France
G	23	Dylan Jergens (W)	6 ft 0 in (1.83 m)	160 lb (73 kg)	So	Mendon, Michigan
G/F	24	Tony Green	6 ft 6 in (1.98 m)	180 lb (82 kg)	Fr	Naples, Florida
G	32	Oscar Lopez Jr.	6 ft 4 in (1.93 m)	200 lb (91 kg)	Jr	Cypress, California
F	34	Caleb Hodgson	6 ft 10 in (2.08 m)	235 lb (107 kg)	RS So	Dansville, Michigan

Head coach

- Tony Barbee (UMass)

Assistant coach(es)

- Shane Heirman (Tulsa)
- Marlon Williamson (Youngstown State)
- Chris McMillian (Wyoming)

Legend

- (C) Team captain
- (S) Suspended
- (I) Ineligible
- (W) Walk-on
- Injured
- Current redshirt

Roster
Last update: January 6, 2022

== Schedule and results ==
Date time, TV	Rank^{#}	Opponent^{#}	Result	Record	Site (attendance) city, state
Exhibition
November 5, 2021*; 7:00 pm		Olivet College	W 114–66		McGuirk Arena; Mount Pleasant, MI
Non-conference regular season
November 9, 2021*; 8:00 pm, SECN+		at Missouri	L 68–78	0–1	Mizzou Arena (7,272); Columbia, MO
November 13, 2021*; 6:00 pm, FS2		at DePaul	L 66–99	0–2	Wintrust Arena (2,466); Chicago, Illinois
November 15, 2021*; 8:00 pm, ESPN+		at Eastern Illinois	W 62–61	1–2	Lantz Arena (1,175); Charleston, IL
November 22, 2021*; 11:00 pm, ESPNU		vs. No. 1 Gonzaga; Empire Classic	L 54–107	1–3	T-Mobile Arena (7,029); Las Vegas, NV
November 23, 2021*; 7:00 pm, ESPN+		vs. Bellarmine; Empire Classic	L 69–76	1–4	T-Mobile Arena; Las Vegas, NV
November 29, 2021*; 7:00 pm, SECN+		at Kentucky	L 57–85	1–5	Rupp Arena (18,080); Lexington, KY
December 1, 2021*; 6:30 pm, FS1		at Xavier	L 45–78	1–6	Cintas Center (9,449); Cincinnati, OH
December 5, 2021*; 2:00 pm, ESPN3		Western Illinois	L 70–97	1–7	McGuirk Arena (1,299); Mount Pleasant, MI
December 8, 2021*; 7:00 pm, ESPN+		at Youngstown State	L 77–84	1–8	Beeghly Center (2,060); Youngstown, OH
December 11, 2021*; 4:30 pm, ESPN3		UIC	L 67–71	1–9	McGuirk Arena (1,334); Mount Pleasant, MI
December 19, 2021*; 1:00 pm, ESPN+		at Detroit Mercy	L 75–89	1–10	Calihan Hall (1,921); Detroit, MI
MAC regular season
December 29, 2021; 7:00 pm, BoxCast		at Kent State	W 72–69	2–10 (1–0)	MAC Center (802); Kent, OH
January 4, 2022; 7:00 pm, ESPN3		Toledo	L 54–82	2–11 (1–1)	McGuirk Arena (1,075); Mount Pleasant, MI
January 11, 2022; 7:00 pm, ESPN3		at Eastern Michigan	L 68–99	2–12 (1–2)	George Gervin GameAbove Center (1,131); Ypsilanti, MI
January 18, 2022; 7:00 pm, ESPN+		at Buffalo	Postponed due to COVID-19 issues		Alumni Arena; Amherst, NY
January 22, 2022; 7:00 pm, ESPN3		Ball State	Postponed due to COVID-19 issues		McGuirk Arena; Mount Pleasant, MI
January 25, 2022; 7:00 pm, ESPN3		Akron	L 56–60	2–13 (1–3)	McGuirk Arena (1,156); Mount Pleasant, MI
January 29, 2022; 4:00 pm, ESPN3		at Northern Illinois	W 69–63	3–13 (2–3)	Convocation Center (773); DeKalb, IL
February 1, 2022; 7:00 pm, ESPN+		Bowling Green	W 78–74	4–13 (3–3)	McGuirk Arena (1,274); Mount Pleasant, MI
February 3, 2022; 7:00 pm, ESPN3		Western Michigan; Rescheduled from January 8	W 65–55	5–13 (4–3)	McGuirk Arena (1,700); Mount Pleasant, MI
February 5, 2022; 5:00 pm, ESPN3		Buffalo	L 54–74	5–14 (4–4)	McGuirk Arena (1,933); Mount Pleasant, MI
February 8, 2022; 7:00 pm, ESPN3		at Ball State	W 89–85 ^{OT}	6–14 (5–4)	Worthen Arena (2,628); Muncie, IN
February 10, 2022; 7:00 pm, ESPN3		Ohio; Rescheduled from January 15	L 72–81	6–15 (5–5)	McGuirk Arena (1,286); Mount Pleasant, MI
February 12, 2022; 2:00 pm, ESPN+		at Western Michigan	L 63–77	6–16 (5–6)	University Arena (2,072); Kalamazoo, MI
February 15, 2022; 7:00 pm, ESPN+		Eastern Michigan	L 70–75	6–17 (5–7)	McGuirk Arena (1,253); Mount Pleasant, MI
February 19, 2022; 2:00 pm, ESPN+		at Toledo	L 66–68	6–18 (5–8)	Savage Arena (5,049); Toledo, OH
February 22, 2022; 7:00 pm, ESPN3		at Ohio	L 50–76	6–19 (5–9)	Convocation Center (5,861); Athens, OH
February 24, 2022; 7:00 pm, ESPN3		at Miami; Rescheduled from January 1	W 83–69	7–19 (6–9)	Millett Hall (1,221); Oxford, OH
February 26, 2022; 7:00 pm, ESPN3		Kent State	L 71–73	7–20 (6–10)	McGuirk Arena (1,832); Mount Pleasant, MI
March 1, 2022; 7:00 pm, ESPN+		Miami	L 61–75	7–21 (6–11)	McGuirk Arena (1,229); Mount Pleasant, MI
March 4, 2022; 7:00 pm, ESPN+		at Akron	L 56–57	7–22 (6–12)	James A. Rhodes Arena (2,128); Akron, OH
MAC tournament
March 10, 2022; 11:00 am, ESPN+	(8)	vs. (1) Toledo; Quarterfinals	L 71–72	7–23	Rocket Mortgage FieldHouse; Cleveland, OH
*Non-conference game. ^{#}Rankings from AP Poll. (#) Tournament seedings in parentheses. All times are in Eastern.
