= 2021–22 Kent State Golden Flashes men's basketball team =

American college basketball season

2021–22 Kent State Golden Flashes men's basketball

The Basketball Classic, First Round
- Conference: Mid-American Conference
- Record: 23–11 (16–4 MAC)
- Head coach: Rob Senderoff (11th season)
- Associate head coach: Aaron Fuss (3rd season)
- Assistant coaches: Julian Sullinger (4th season); Randal Holt (1st season)
- Home arena: MAC Center

2021–22 Mid-American Conference men's basketball standings
	Conf.				Overall
Team	W		L	PCT	W		L	PCT
Toledo	17	–	3	.850	26	–	8	.765
Kent State	16	–	4	.800	23	–	11	.676
Ohio	14	–	6	.700	25	–	10	.714
Akron †	14	–	6	.700	24	–	10	.706
Buffalo	13	–	6	.684	19	–	11	.633
Ball State	9	–	10	.474	14	–	17	.452
Miami (OH)	8	–	12	.400	14	–	18	.438
Central Michigan	6	–	12	.333	7	–	23	.233
Bowling Green	6	–	14	.300	13	–	18	.419
Northern Illinois	6	–	14	.300	9	–	21	.300
Eastern Michigan	5	–	15	.250	10	–	21	.323
Western Michigan	4	–	16	.200	8	–	23	.258
† 2022 MAC tournament winner

The 2021–22 Kent State Golden Flashes men's basketball team represented Kent State University in the 2021–22 NCAA Division I men's basketball season. The Golden Flashes, led by 11th-year head coach Rob Senderoff, played their home games at the Memorial Athletic and Convocation Center, also known as the MAC Center, in Kent, Ohio as members of the Mid-American Conference (MAC). It is the program's 106th season of play and 71st as a member of the MAC.

== Previous season ==
The Golden Flashes finished the 2020–21 season 15–8 overall, 12–6 in MAC play to finish fourth place in conference. They lost to Ohio in the first round of the MAC tournament.

== Offseason ==
=== Departures ===
Departures
Name	Pos.	Height	Weight	Year	Hometown	Notes
Evan Bainbridge	F	6'9	205	Junior	Stow, OH	Transferred to Ashland
Kalin Bennett	F	6'11	300	Junior	Little Rock, AR	Transferred to Morehouse
James Jordan	G	6'5	180	Senior	Detroit, MI	Transferred to Eastern New Mexico
Michael Nuga	G	6'2	180	Graduate Student	Toronto, Ontario	Transferred to UNLV
Gabe O'Neal	F	6'7	240	Senior	Cincinnati, OH	Transferred to Bowling Green
Danny Pippen	F	6'9	232	Redshirt Senior	Detroit, MI	Graduated - playing for the Greensboro Swarm in the NBA G League

=== Incoming transfers ===
Transfers
Name	Pos.	Height	Weight	Year	Hometown	Previous school
Sincere Carry	G	6'1	185	Redshirt Junior	Solon, OH	Duquesne
Andrew Garcia	G	6'5	224	Graduate Student	Harlem, NY	Georgia
DJ Johnson	F	6'8	184	Redshirt Junior	Brooklyn, NY	Rhode Island
Akeem Odusipe	F	6'8	225	Redshirt Freshman	Lagos, Nigeria	Vanderbilt

=== Recruiting class ===
College recruiting information
Name	Hometown	School	Height	Weight	Commit date
Cli'Ron Hornbeak; C	Toledo, OH	St. Francis de Sales School	6 ft 9 in (2.06 m)	245 lb (111 kg)	Nov 11, 2020
Cli'Ron Hornbeak; C	Recruit ratings: Rivals: 247Sports: (NR)				
Julius Rollins; SF	Country Club Hills, IL	Hillcrest High School	6 ft 6 in (1.98 m)	170 lb (77 kg)	Nov 11, 2020
Julius Rollins; SF	Recruit ratings: Scout: Rivals: 247Sports: (NR)				
Jalen Sullinger; PG	Columbus, OH	Thomas Worthington High School	5 ft 10 in (1.78 m)	170 lb (77 kg)	Nov 11, 2020
Jalen Sullinger; PG	Recruit ratings: Scout: Rivals: 247Sports: (NR)				
Overall recruit ranking:
Note: In many cases, Scout, Rivals, 247Sports, On3, and ESPN may conflict in their listings of height and weight.; In these cases, the average was taken. ESPN grades are on a 100-point scale.; Sources: "2021 Team Ranking". Rivals.

== Roster ==
2021–22 Kent State Golden Flashes men's basketball team
Players
Coaches

Pos.	#	Name	Height	Weight	Year	Hometown
G	0	Julius Rollins	6 ft 5 in (1.96 m)	189 lb (86 kg)	Fr	Chicago, Illinois
F	1	VonCameron Davis	6 ft 5 in (1.96 m)	216 lb (98 kg)	RS Fr	Columbus, Ohio
G	2	Malique Jacobs	6 ft 3 in (1.91 m)	194 lb (88 kg)	RS Jr	Wilmington, North Carolina
G	3	Sincere Carry	6 ft 1 in (1.85 m)	185 lb (84 kg)	RS Jr	Solon, Ohio
G	4	Andrew Garcia	6 ft 5 in (1.96 m)	224 lb (102 kg)	GS	Harlem, New York
F	5	DJ Johnson	6 ft 8 in (2.03 m)	184 lb (83 kg)	RS Jr	Brooklyn, New York
G	11	Giovanni Santiago	6 ft 1 in (1.85 m)	164 lb (74 kg)	RS So	Bayamón, Puerto Rico
G	13	Jalen Sullinger	5 ft 10 in (1.78 m)	170 lb (77 kg)	Fr	Columbus, Ohio
F	14	Tervell Beck	6 ft 7 in (2.01 m)	231 lb (105 kg)	RS Sr	Cleveland, Ohio
G	15	Mike Digiulio	6 ft 0 in (1.83 m)	170 lb (77 kg)	RS Fr	Buffalo, New York
F	21	Justyn Hamilton	6 ft 11 in (2.11 m)	208 lb (94 kg)	RS Sr	Charlotte, North Carolina
F	32	Gabe O'Neal	6 ft 7 in (2.01 m)	240 lb (109 kg)	Jr	Cincinnati, Ohio
G	33	Jeremiah Hernandez	6 ft 4 in (1.93 m)	180 lb (82 kg)	RS So	Chicago, Illinois
F	34	Akeem Odusipe	6 ft 8 in (2.03 m)	225 lb (102 kg)	RS Fr	Lagos, Nigeria
F	40	Jarred Logan	6 ft 5 in (1.96 m)	199 lb (90 kg)	RS Fr	Elyria, Ohio
C	42	Cli'Ron Hornbeak	6 ft 9 in (2.06 m)	224 lb (102 kg)	Fr	Toledo, Ohio

Head coach

- Rob Senderoff (Albany/Miami (FL))

Assistant coach(es)

- Aaron Fuss (Ohio State)
- Julian Sullinger (Kent State)
- Randal Holt (Kent State)

Legend

- (C) Team captain
- (S) Suspended
- (I) Ineligible
- (W) Walk-on
- Injured
- Current redshirt

Roster
Last update: November 27, 2021

== Schedule and results ==
Date time, TV	Rank^{#}	Opponent^{#}	Result	Record	High points	High rebounds	High assists	Site (attendance) city, state
Non-conference regular season
November 12, 2021*; 6:30 pm, FS1		at Xavier	L 59–73	0–1	18 – Carry	9 – Jacobs	4 – Carry	Cintas Center (10,224); Cincinnati, OH
November 16, 2021*; 7:00 pm, ESPN3		Oberlin College	W 84–38	1–1	14 – Tied	10 – Davis	5 – Santiago	MAC Center (1,682); Kent, OH
November 22, 2021*; 12:00 pm, FloHoops		vs. James Madison; Naples Invitational First Round	W 74–69	2–1	18 – Jacobs	7 – Tied	5 – Jacobs	Community School of Naples (607); Naples, FL
November 23, 2021*; 5:30 pm, FloHoops		vs. George Washington; Naples Invitational Semifinals	W 77–69	3–1	20 – Carry	7 – Jacobs	7 – Jacobs	Community School of Naples (307); Naples, FL
November 24, 2021*; 8:00 pm, FloHoops		vs. East Tennessee State; Naples Invitational Championship	L 51–57	3–2	21 – Carry	12 – Jacobs	4 – Carry	Community School of Naples (237); Naples, FL
November 30, 2021*; 7:00 pm, ESPN3		Point Park	W 107–41	4–2	24 – Sullinger	12 – Hamilton	8 – Carry	MAC Center (1,214); Kent, OH
December 6, 2021*; 7:00 pm, ESPN3		Towson	L 58–73	4–3	17 – Carry	5 – Tied	5 – Carry	MAC Center (1,397); Kent, OH
December 9, 2021*; 7:00 pm, ESPN3		Detroit Mercy	W 69–52	5–3	23 – Jacobs	11 – Jacobs	5 – Santiago	MAC Center (2,176); Kent, OH
December 12, 2021*; 4:00 pm, ESPN2		at West Virginia	L 50–63	5–4	18 – Carry	12 – Hamilton	5 – Carry	WVU Coliseum (11,532); Morgantown, WV
December 19, 2021*; 5:30 pm, ESPN3		Southern	L 76–78	5–5	14 – Carry	8 – Hamilton	5 – Carry	MAC Center (1,234); Kent, OH
December 21, 2021*; 6:00 pm, ESPN3		Cleveland State	Canceled due to COVID-19 issues at Cleveland State					MAC Center; Kent, OH
MAC regular season
December 29, 2021; 4:30 pm, BoxCast		Central Michigan	L 69–72	5–6 (0–1)	22 – Carry	5 – Tied	6 – Jacobs	MAC Center (802); Kent, OH
January 1, 2022; 2:00 pm, ESPN3		Toledo	W 66–63	6–6 (1–1)	19 – Carry	11 – Hamilton	4 – Carry	MAC Center (701); Kent, OH
January 4, 2022; 7:00 pm, ESPN3		at Ball State	W 66–65	7–6 (2–1)	26 – Carry	8 – Hamilton	6 – Carry	Worthen Arena (2,885); Muncie, IN
January 7, 2022; 6:30 pm, CBSSN		at Ohio	L 72–80	7–7 (2–2)	26 – Carry	8 – Tied	6 – Carry	Convocation Center (4,576); Athens, OH
January 11, 2022; 7:00 pm, ESPN3		Northern Illinois	L 63–65	7–8 (2–3)	16 – Tied	10 – Jacobs	6 – Carry	MAC Center (1,423); Kent, OH
January 14, 2022; 8:00 pm, CBSSN		Akron	W 67–55	8–8 (3–3)	32 – Carry	7 – Jacobs	4 – Jacobs	MAC Center (1,791); Kent, OH
January 18, 2022; 7:00 pm, ESPN+		at Eastern Michigan	W 56–47	9–8 (4–3)	17 – Jacobs	5 – Tied	6 – Carry	George Gervin GameAbove Center (1,063); Ypsilanti, MI
January 21, 2022; 8:00 pm, CBSSN		at Buffalo	L 51–64	9–9 (4–4)	11 – Beck	9 – Hamilton	5 – Carry	Alumni Arena (2,056); Amherst, NY
January 25, 2022; 7:00 pm, ESPN3		Western Michigan	W 75–64	10–9 (5–4)	18 – Garcia	10 – Jacobs	6 – Jacobs	MAC Center (2,134); Kent, OH
January 29, 2022; 5:00 pm, ESPN3		at Bowling Green	W 91–83	11–9 (6–4)	30 – Carry	11 – Jacobs	7 – Tied	Stroh Center (2,475); Bowling Green, OH
February 1, 2022; 7:00 pm, ESPN+		at Miami (OH)	W 78–65	12–9 (7–4)	20 – Carry	10 – Hamilton	4 – Tied	Millett Hall (1,930); Oxford, OH
February 5, 2022; 2:00 pm, ESPN+		Eastern Michigan	W 90–71	13–9 (8–4)	21 – Santiago	7 – Carry	6 – Jacobs	MAC Center (1,943); Kent, OH
February 8, 2022; 7:00 pm, ESPN3		Bowling Green	W 76–68	14–9 (9–4)	18 – Santiago	8 – Jacobs	5 – Carry	MAC Center (1,677); Kent, OH
February 11, 2022; 7:00 pm, ESPN2		at Akron	W 66–64	15–9 (10–4)	19 – Carry	10 – Jacobs	3 – Jacobs	James A. Rhodes Arena (3,699); Akron, OH
February 15, 2022; 6:00 pm, CBSSN		at Toledo	W 72–59	16–9 (11–4)	23 – Carry	8 – Tied	5 – Carry	Savage Arena (4,570); Toledo, OH
February 18, 2022; 7:00 pm, CBSSN		Ohio	W 75–52	17–9 (12–4)	14 – Tied	9 – Jacobs	7 – Carry	MAC Center (4,875); Kent, OH
February 22, 2022; 7:00 pm, ESPN3		Ball State	W 93–82	18–9 (13–4)	42 – Carry	11 – Jacobs	10 – Jacobs	MAC Center (2,221); Kent, OH
February 26, 2022; 7:00 pm, ESPN3		at Central Michigan	W 73–71	19–9 (14–4)	21 – Garcia	10 – Garcia	3 – Jacobs	McGuirk Arena (1,832); Mount Pleasant, MI
March 1, 2022; 8:00 pm, ESPN3		at Northern Illinois	W 63–55	20–9 (15–4)	22 – Carry	9 – Jacobs	6 – Carry	Convocation Center (706); DeKalb, IL
March 4, 2022; 6:00 pm, ESPNU		Buffalo	W 70–65	21–9 (16–4)	20 – Carry	9 – Jacobs	9 – Carry	MAC Center (4,283); Kent, OH
MAC tournament
March 10, 2022; 4:00 pm, ESPN+	(2)	vs. (7) Miami (OH); Quarterfinals	W 85–75	22–9	21 – Jacobs	11 – Jacobs	8 – Carry	Rocket Mortgage FieldHouse; Cleveland, OH
March 11, 2022; 7:30 pm, CBSSN	(2)	vs. (3) Ohio; Semifinals	W 67–61	23–9	19 – Jacobs	10 – Jacobs	5 – Jacobs	Rocket Mortgage FieldHouse; Cleveland, OH
March 12, 2022; 7:30 pm, ESPN2	(2)	vs. (4) Akron; Championship	L 55–75	23–10	19 – Hamilton	8 – Hamilton	4 – Jacobs	Rocket Mortgage FieldHouse (8,361); Cleveland, OH
The Basketball Classic
March 16, 2022; 9:00 pm, ESPN+		at Southern Utah; First round – Willis Reed Game	L 79–83	23–11	28 – Jacobs	5 – Tied	5 – Jacobs	America First Event Center (1,316); Cedar City, UT
*Non-conference game. ^{#}Rankings from AP Poll. (#) Tournament seedings in parentheses. All times are in Eastern Time.
