= 2022 MAC men's basketball tournament =

- Classification: Division I
- Season: 2021–22
- Teams: 8
- Site: Rocket Mortgage FieldHouse; Cleveland, Ohio
- Champions: Akron (4th title)
- Winning coach: John Groce (3rd title)
- MVP: Enrique Freeman (Akron)
- Television: CBSSN, ESPN2, ESPN+
- MAC men's basketball tournaments

2021–22 Mid-American Conference men's basketball standings
	Conf.				Overall
Team	W		L	PCT	W		L	PCT
Toledo	17	–	3	.850	26	–	8	.765
Kent State	16	–	4	.800	23	–	11	.676
Ohio	14	–	6	.700	25	–	10	.714
Akron †	14	–	6	.700	24	–	10	.706
Buffalo	13	–	6	.684	19	–	11	.633
Ball State	9	–	10	.474	14	–	17	.452
Miami (OH)	8	–	12	.400	14	–	18	.438
Central Michigan	6	–	12	.333	7	–	23	.233
Bowling Green	6	–	14	.300	13	–	18	.419
Northern Illinois	6	–	14	.300	9	–	21	.300
Eastern Michigan	5	–	15	.250	10	–	21	.323
Western Michigan	4	–	16	.200	8	–	23	.258
† 2022 MAC tournament winner

The 2022 Mid-American Conference men's basketball tournament was the postseason men's basketball tournament for the Mid-American Conference (MAC) held March 10–12, 2022. The entire tournament was played at Rocket Mortgage FieldHouse in Cleveland, Ohio. The tournament champion, the Akron Zips, received the conference's automatic bid to the 2022 NCAA tournament where they lost in the first round to UCLA.

== Format ==
As with the 2021 tournament, only the top eight teams qualify. The winner of the tournament will receive the MAC's automatic bid to the 2022 NCAA tournament.

== Venue ==
The 2022 MAC tournament is scheduled to be held at Rocket Mortgage FieldHouse for the 23rd consecutive season. The venue, located in downtown Cleveland at One Center Court, is the home of the Cleveland Cavaliers of the National Basketball Association (NBA) and has a seating capacity for basketball of 19,432.

== Seeds ==
Eight out of the 12 MAC teams qualified for the tournament. Teams were seeded by record within the conference, with a tiebreaker system to seed teams with identical conference records.

Seed	School	Conference record	Tiebreaker
1	Toledo	17–3	
2	Kent State	16–4	
3	Ohio	14–6	1–1 vs. Kent State
4	Akron	14–6	0–2 vs. Kent State
5	Buffalo	13–6	
6	Ball State	9–10	
7	Miami	8–12	
8	Central Michigan	6–12	
DNQ	Bowling Green	6–14	
DNQ	Northern Illinois	6–14	
DNQ	Eastern Michigan	5–15	
DNQ	Western Michigan	4–16	

== Schedule ==
Game	Time	Matchup	Score	Television
Quarterfinals – Thursday, March 10 – Rocket Mortgage FieldHouse, Cleveland, OH
1	11:00 am	No. 8 Central Michigan vs. No. 1 Toledo	71–72	ESPN+
2	1:30 pm	No. 5 Buffalo vs. No. 4 Akron	68–70	ESPN+
3	4:00 pm	No. 7 Miami vs. No. 2 Kent State	75–85	ESPN+
4	6:30 pm	No. 6 Ball State vs. No. 3 Ohio	67–77	ESPN+
Semifinals – Friday, March 11 – Rocket Mortgage FieldHouse, Cleveland, OH
5	5:00 pm	No. 4 Akron vs. No. 1 Toledo	70-62	CBSSN
6	Approx. 7:30 pm	No. 3 Ohio vs. No. 2 Kent State	61-67	CBSSN
Championship – Saturday, March 12 – Rocket Mortgage FieldHouse, Cleveland, OH
7	7:30 pm	No. 4 Akron vs. No. 2 Kent State	75-55	ESPN2
Game times in ET. Rankings denote tournament seed

* denotes overtime period

== Bracket ==
Quarterfinals; Thursday, March 10, 2022; ESPN+
1	Toledo	72
8	Central Michigan	71
4	Akron	70
5	Buffalo	68
2	Kent State	85
7	Miami (OH)	75
3	Ohio	77
6	Ball State	67

Semifinals; Friday, March 11, 2022; CBSSN
1	Toledo	62
4	Akron	70
2	Kent State	67
3	Ohio	61

Championship; Saturday, March 12, 2022; ESPN2
4	Akron	75
2	Kent State	55

== All-Tournament Team ==
Tournament MVP – Enrique Freeman, Akron

Player	Team
Mark Sears	Ohio
Sincere Carry	Kent State
Ali Ali	Akron
Xavier Castaneda	Akron
Enrique Freeman	Akron

== See also ==
- 2022 MAC women's basketball tournament
