= 2021–22 Northern Illinois Huskies men's basketball team =

American college basketball season

2021–22 Northern Illinois Huskies men's basketball
- Conference: Mid-American Conference
- Record: 9–21 (6–14 MAC)
- Head coach: Rashon Burno (1st season)
- Assistant coaches: Steve Christinsen; Drew Gladstone; Branden McDonald
- Home arena: Convocation Center

2021–22 Mid-American Conference men's basketball standings
	Conf.				Overall
Team	W		L	PCT	W		L	PCT
Toledo	17	–	3	.850	26	–	8	.765
Kent State	16	–	4	.800	23	–	11	.676
Ohio	14	–	6	.700	25	–	10	.714
Akron †	14	–	6	.700	24	–	10	.706
Buffalo	13	–	6	.684	19	–	11	.633
Ball State	9	–	10	.474	14	–	17	.452
Miami (OH)	8	–	12	.400	14	–	18	.438
Central Michigan	6	–	12	.333	7	–	23	.233
Bowling Green	6	–	14	.300	13	–	18	.419
Northern Illinois	6	–	14	.300	9	–	21	.300
Eastern Michigan	5	–	15	.250	10	–	21	.323
Western Michigan	4	–	16	.200	8	–	23	.258
† 2022 MAC tournament winner

The 2021–22 Northern Illinois Huskies men's basketball team represented Northern Illinois University in the 2021–22 NCAA Division I men's basketball season. The Huskies were led by first-year head coach Rashon Burno, played their home games at the Convocation Center in DeKalb, Illinois as members of the Mid-American Conference. They finished the season 9–21, 6–14 in MAC play to finish a tie for ninth place. They failed to qualify for the MAC tournament.

== Previous season ==
In a season limited due to the ongoing COVID-19 pandemic, the Huskies finished the 2020–21 season 3–16, 2–12 in MAC play to finish in last place. They failed to qualify for the MAC tournament which had been limited to provide that the bottom four finishers would not be eligible. The MAC also announced the removal of divisions in cost-cutting measure partly attributed to COVID-19.

On January 3, 2021, it was announced that head coach Mark Montgomery had been relieved of his duties after the team's 1–7 start to the season. Associate head coach Lamar Chapman was named interim head coach for the remainder of the season. On March 6, the school named Arizona State assistant Rashon Burno the new head coach.

== Roster ==
2021–22 Northern Illinois Huskies men's basketball team
Players
Coaches

Pos.	#	Name	Height	Weight	Year	Previous school	Hometown
G	0	Keshawn Williams	6 ft 3 in (1.91 m)	175 lb (79 kg)	So	Tulsa	Chicago Heights, IL
G	1	Trendon Hankerson	6 ft 2 in (1.88 m)	185 lb (84 kg)	Sr	Novi HS	Novi, MI
G	2	Kaleb Thornton	6 ft 0 in (1.83 m)	175 lb (79 kg)	Jr	Iowa Western CC	Bolingbrook, IL
G	3	Noah Kon	6 ft 1 in (1.85 m)	180 lb (82 kg)	Fr	Houston Christian HS	Houston, TX
F	4	Montavious Myrick	6 ft 8 in (2.03 m)	215 lb (98 kg)	Fr	North Atlanta HS	Atlanta, GA
F	5	Chris Osten	6 ft 9 in (2.06 m)	215 lb (98 kg)	Sr	Arizona State	Crowley, LA
G	10	Zion Russell	6 ft 0 in (1.83 m)	185 lb (84 kg)	Fr	National Christian Academy	Upper Marlboro, MD
F	11	Chinedu Kingsley Okanu	6 ft 7 in (2.01 m)	225 lb (102 kg)	Sr	Vincennes	Lynwood, IL
F	12	Zool Kueth	6 ft 7 in (2.01 m)	210 lb (95 kg)	Sr	Pratt CC	Gallatin, TN
C	13	Adong Makuoi	6 ft 9 in (2.06 m)	220 lb (100 kg)	Sr	Daytona State College	Edmonton, Alberta, Canada
G	22	Edward Manuel	6 ft 6 in (1.98 m)	190 lb (86 kg)	Jr	Navarro College	Lake Charles, LA
G	24	Darweshi Hunter	6 ft 5 in (1.96 m)	200 lb (91 kg)	Jr	Weber State	Cincinnati, OH
F	25	Drew Wiemers	6 ft 4 in (1.93 m)	200 lb (91 kg)	Jr	Benedictine	Coal Valley, IL
G	50	Anthony Crump	6 ft 8 in (2.03 m)	210 lb (95 kg)	Sr	Middle Tennessee	Inkster, MI

Head coach

- Rashon Burno (DePaul)

Assistant coach(es)

- Steve Christiansen (Northern Illinois)
- Drew Gladstone (DePaul)
- Branden McDonald (Virginia Union)

Legend

- (C) Team captain
- (S) Suspended
- (I) Ineligible
- (W) Walk-on
- Injured
- Current redshirt

Roster

== Schedule and results ==
Date time, TV	Rank^{#}	Opponent^{#}	Result	Record	Site (attendance) city, state
Exhibition
October 30, 2021*; 1:00 pm		St. Francis	W 80–57	–	Convocation Center (103); DeKalb, IL
Non-conference regular season
November 9, 2021*; 7:00 pm, P12N		at Washington	W 71–64	1–0	Alaska Airlines Arena (6,356); Seattle, WA
November 12, 2021*; 6:00 pm, BTN+		at Indiana	L 49–85	1–1	Simon Skjodt Assembly Hall (17,222); Bloomington, IN
November 18, 2021*; 7:00 pm, SECN+		at Missouri; Jacksonville Classic campus game	L 37–54	1–2	Mizzou Arena (6,302); Columbia, MO
November 21, 2021*; 11:00 am		vs. Boston University; Jacksonville Classic (Jax Bracket) semifinal	L 58–76	1–3	UNF Arena (450); Jacksonville, FL
November 22, 2021*; 10:00 am		vs. Little Rock; Jacksonville Classic (Jax Bracket) consolation	L 60–67	1–4	UNF Arena (180); Jacksonville, FL
November 27, 2021*; 7:00 pm, FS2		at Marquette	L 66–80	1–5	Fiserv Forum (13,272); Milwaukee, WI
December 1, 2021*; 7:00 pm, ESPN3		Eastern Illinois	W 55–45	2–5	Convocation Center (1,153); DeKalb, IL
December 4, 2021*; 1:00 pm, BSOH/ESPN+		at Dayton	L 41–79	2–6	UD Arena (13,407); Dayton, OH
December 13, 2021*; 12:00 pm, ESPN+		at Chicago State	W 70–59	3–6	Jones Convocation Center (262); Chicago, IL
December 19, 2021*; 1:00 pm, ESPN+		at UIC	L 60–61	3–7	Credit Union 1 Arena (2148); Chicago, IL
December 22, 2021*; 7:00 pm, ESPN3		Indiana State	Canceled due to COVID-19 protocols		Convocation Center; DeKalb, IL
MAC regular season
January 8, 2022; 1:00 pm, ESPN3		at Toledo	L 63–94	3–8 (0–1)	Savage Arena (3,780); Toledo, OH
January 11, 2022; 6:00 pm, ESPN3		at Kent State	W 65–63	4–8 (1–1)	MAC Center (1,423); Kent, OH
January 15, 2022; 3:30 pm, ESPN3		Eastern Michigan	W 77–70	5–8 (2–1)	Convocation Center (1,035); DeKalb, IL
January 18, 2022; 7:00 pm, ESPN3		Bowling Green	L 83–92	5–9 (2–2)	Convocation Center (553); DeKalb, IL
January 22, 2022; 2:30 pm, ESPN3		at Miami (OH)	L 82–85 ^{OT}	5–10 (2–3)	Millett Hall (1,214); Oxford, OH
January 25, 2022; 6:00 pm, ESPN+		at Ohio	L 62–74	5–11 (2–4)	Convocation Center (4,783); Athens, OH
January 27, 2022; 8:00 pm, ESPN3		Ball State; Rescheduled from December 29	L 67–74	5–12 (2–5)	Convocation Center (613); DeKalb, IL
January 29, 2022; 3:00 pm, ESPN3		Central Michigan	L 63–69	5–13 (2–6)	Convocation Center (773); DeKalb, IL
February 1, 2022; 6:00 pm, ESPN3		at Western Michigan	W 75–56	6–13 (3–6)	University Arena (1,217); Kalamazoo, MI
February 5, 2022; 4:00 pm, ESPN3		at Bowling Green	L 65–87	6–14 (3–7)	Stroh Center (1,995); Bowling Green, OH
February 8, 2022; 7:00 pm, ESPN3		Akron	L 64–70	6–15 (3–8)	Convocation Center (653); DeKalb, IL
February 12, 2022; 3:30 pm, ESPN+		Toledo	L 72–100	6–16 (3–9)	Convocation Center (1,141); DeKalb, IL
February 15, 2022; 6:00 pm, ESPN+		at Ball State	W 64–58	7–16 (4–9)	Worthen Arena (2,918); Muncie, IN
February 17, 2022; 6:00 pm, ESPN3		at Akron; Rescheduled from January 1	W 66–63	8–16 (5–9)	Rhodes Arena (2,076); Akron, OH
February 19, 2022; 3:30 pm, ESPN+		Miami (OH)	L 75–78	8–17 (5–10)	Convocation Center (1,507); DeKalb, IL
February 22, 2022; 6:00 pm, ESPN3		at Eastern Michigan	L 72–74	8–18 (5–11)	George Gervin GameAbove Center (1,294); Ypsilanti, MI
February 24, 2022; 7:00 pm, ESPN3		Buffalo; Rescheduled from January 4	L 68–79	8–19 (5–12)	Convocation Center (521); DeKalb, IL
February 26, 2022; 1:00 pm, ESPN3		at Buffalo	L 60–70	8–20 (5–13)	Alumni Arena (4,990); Buffalo, NY
March 1, 2022; 7:00 pm, ESPN3		Kent State	L 55–63	8–21 (5–14)	Convocation Center (706); DeKalb, IL
March 4, 2022; 7:00 pm, ESPN+		Ohio	W 58–57	9–21 (6–14)	Convocation Center (794); DeKalb, IL
*Non-conference game. ^{#}Rankings from AP Poll. (#) Tournament seedings in parentheses. All times are in Eastern.
