= 2021–22 Akron Zips men's basketball team =

American college basketball season

2021–22 Akron Zips men's basketball

MAC tournament champions

NCAA tournament, First Round
- Conference: Mid-American Conference
- Record: 24–10 (14–6 MAC)
- Head coach: John Groce (5th season)
- Associate head coach: Dustin Ford (5th season)
- Assistant coaches: Rob Fulford (5th season); Robby Pridgen (5th season)
- Home arena: James A. Rhodes Arena

2021–22 Mid-American Conference men's basketball standings
	Conf.				Overall
Team	W		L	PCT	W		L	PCT
Toledo	17	–	3	.850	26	–	8	.765
Kent State	16	–	4	.800	23	–	11	.676
Ohio	14	–	6	.700	25	–	10	.714
Akron †	14	–	6	.700	24	–	10	.706
Buffalo	13	–	6	.684	19	–	11	.633
Ball State	9	–	10	.474	14	–	17	.452
Miami (OH)	8	–	12	.400	14	–	18	.438
Central Michigan	6	–	12	.333	7	–	23	.233
Bowling Green	6	–	14	.300	13	–	18	.419
Northern Illinois	6	–	14	.300	9	–	21	.300
Eastern Michigan	5	–	15	.250	10	–	21	.323
Western Michigan	4	–	16	.200	8	–	23	.258
† 2022 MAC tournament winner

The 2021–22 Akron Zips men's basketball team represented the University of Akron during the 2021–22 NCAA Division I men's basketball season. The Zips, led by fifth-year head coach John Groce, played their home games at the James A. Rhodes Arena in Akron, Ohio as members of the Mid-American Conference. They finished the season 24–10, 14–6 in MAC play to finish a tie for third place. As the No. 4 seed, they defeated Buffalo, Toledo, and Kent State to win the MAC tournament. They received the conference’s automatic bid to the NCAA tournament as the No. 13 seed in the East Region, where they lost in the first round to UCLA.

== Previous season ==
In a season limited due to the ongoing COVID-19 pandemic, the Zips finished the 2020–21 season 15–8, 12–6 in MAC play to finish in a tie for third place. They defeated Bowling Green in the quarterfinals of the MAC tournament before losing to Buffalo in the semifinals.

== Roster ==
2021–22 Akron Zips men's basketball team
Players
Coaches

Pos.	#	Name	Height	Weight	Year	Previous school	Hometown
G/F	0	Michael Wynn	6 ft 6 in (1.98 m)	204 lb (93 kg)	Jr	Wake Forest	Albany, NY
G	2	Greg Tribble	6 ft 1 in (1.85 m)	195 lb (88 kg)	So	Huntington Prep	Cincinnati, OH
G	3	Kobe Mitchell	6 ft 2 in (1.88 m)	190 lb (86 kg)	Fr	Harrison Central HS	Cadiz, OH
G	4	Bryan Trimble Jr.	6 ft 2 in (1.88 m)	203 lb (92 kg)	Jr	St. John's	Kansas City, MO
G	11	Garvin Clarke	6 ft 0 in (1.83 m)	184 lb (83 kg)	Fr	Cleveland Heights HS	Euclid, OH
G	12	Pat Mayfield	6 ft 5 in (1.96 m)	185 lb (84 kg)	Fr	Burlington Central HS	Elgin, IL
G	13	Xavier Castaneda	6 ft 1 in (1.85 m)	188 lb (85 kg)	Jr	South Florida	Chicago, IL
G	20	Evan Wilson	6 ft 2 in (1.88 m)	200 lb (91 kg)	Fr	Noblesville HS	Noblesville, IN
C	21	Aziz Bandaogo	7 ft 0 in (2.13 m)	215 lb (98 kg)	Fr	NBA Academy Africa	Dakar, Senegal
G/F	22	Mikal Dawson	6 ft 5 in (1.96 m)	222 lb (101 kg)	So	Huntington Prep	Huntington, WV
F	23	Sekou Kalle	6 ft 10 in (2.08 m)	224 lb (102 kg)	Fr	DeSales HS	Louisville, KY
G/F	24	Ali Ali	6 ft 8 in (2.03 m)	196 lb (89 kg)	So	East Noble HS	Kendallville, IN
F	25	Enrique Freeman	6 ft 7 in (2.01 m)	206 lb (93 kg)	So	St. Martin de Porres HS	Cleveland, OH
G	34	Nate Johnson	6 ft 3 in (1.91 m)	204 lb (93 kg)	Fr	Lakota East HS	Liberty Township, OH

Head coach

- John Groce (Taylor)

Assistant coach(es)

- Dustin Ford (Ohio)
- Rob Fulford (Marshall)
- Robby Pridgen (Roanoke)

Legend

- (C) Team captain
- (S) Suspended
- (I) Ineligible
- (W) Walk-on
- Injured
- Current redshirt

Roster
Last update: January 29, 2022

== Schedule and results ==
Date time, TV	Rank^{#}	Opponent^{#}	Result	Record	High points	High rebounds	High assists	Site (attendance) city, state
Exhibition
October 29, 2021*; 7:00 pm, ESPN+		at West Virginia; Charity Exhibition	L 59–74	–	13 – Ali	4 – Castaneda	11 – Freeman	WVU Coliseum (9,434); Morgantown, WV
Non-conference regular season
November 9, 2021*; 6:00 pm, ESPN2		at No. 17 Ohio State	L 66–67	0–1	17 – Ali	9 – Freeman	2 – Tied	Value City Arena (11,947); Columbus, OH
November 13, 2021*; 7:00 pm		Point Park	W 102–46	1–1	18 – Freeman	14 – Freeman	6 – Walton	James A. Rhodes Arena (2,022); Akron, OH
November 18, 2021*; 7:00 pm		Wheeling	W 99–38	2–1	15 – Freeman	13 – Freeman	3 – Tied	James A. Rhodes Arena (1,620); Akron, OH
November 22, 2021*; 5:00 pm, FloHoops		vs. Fordham; Gulf Coast Showcase quarterfinals	L 43–63	2–2	9 – Freeman	11 – Freeman	2 – Dawson	Hertz Arena (370); Estero, FL
November 23, 2021*; 1:30 pm, FloHoops		vs. Appalachian State; Gulf Coast Showcase Consolation 2nd Round	L 45–57	2–3	15 – Freeman	10 – Freeman	3 – Clarke	Hertz Arena (401); Estero, FL
November 24, 2021*; 11:00 am, FloHoops		vs. Evansville; Gulf Coast Showcase 7th place game	W 69–60	3–2	20 – Ali	10 – Freeman	3 – 2 tied	Hertz Arena (150); Estero, FL
December 1, 2021*; 7:00 pm, ESPN+		Marshall	W 88–86	4–3	24 – Freeman	14 – Freeman	5 – Ali	James A. Rhodes Arena (1,752); Akron, OH
December 4, 2021*; 7:00 pm, ESPN+		Southern	W 79–62	5–3	19 – Tribble	13 – Freeman	7 – Ali	James A. Rhodes Arena (1,690); Akron, OH
December 12, 2021*; 2:00 pm, ESPN+		Florida A&M	W 73–66	6–3	17 – Castaneda	11 – Freeman	5 – Castaneda	James A. Rhodes Arena (1,529); Akron, OH
December 15, 2021*; 7:00 pm, ESPN+		at Wright State	W 66–48	7–3	12 – Holden	7 – Basile	2 – Holden	Nutter Center (3,503); Dayton, OH
December 20, 2021*; 7:00 pm, ESPN3		Radford	Postponed due to COVID-19 issues at Akron					James A. Rhodes Arena; Akron, OH
MAC regular season
January 1, 2022; 7:00 pm, ESPN+		Buffalo	W 88–76	8–3 (1–0)	32 – Ali	10 – Freeman	4 – Ali	James A. Rhodes Arena (1,510); Akron, OH
January 4, 2022; 6:00 pm, CBSSN		Ohio	L 63–69	8–4 (1–1)	22 – Ali	10 – Freeman	4 – Ali	James A. Rhodes Arena (1,750); Akron, OH
January 11, 2022; 7:00 pm, ESPN3		Ball State	W 84–74	9–4 (2–1)	29 – Castaneda	12 – Freeman	6 – Castaneda	James A. Rhodes Arena (1,815); Akron, OH
January 14, 2022; 8:00 pm, CBSSN		at Kent State	L 55–67	9–5 (2–2)	21 – Castaneda	7 – Freeman	3 – Tribble	MAC Center (1,791); Kent, OH
January 18, 2022; 7:00 pm, ESPN3		Western Michigan	W 74–73	10–5 (3–2)	18 – Ali	8 – Freeman	6 – Castaneda	James A. Rhodes Arena (1,611); Akron, OH
January 20, 2022; 7:00 pm, ESPN3		at Bowling Green; Rescheduled from December 29	W 91–66	11–5 (4–2)	33 – Trimble Jr.	10 – Freeman	6 – Castaneda	Stroh Center (1,867); Bowling Green, OH
January 22, 2022; 7:00 pm, ESPN3		Eastern Michigan	W 46–44	12–5 (5–2)	15 – Ali	14 – Freeman	3 – Castaneda	James A. Rhodes Arena (2,090); Akron, OH
January 25, 2022; 7:00 pm, ESPN3		at Central Michigan	W 60–56	13–5 (6–2)	16 – Freeman	11 – Freeman	4 – Tribble	McGuirk Arena (1,156); Mount Pleasant, MI
January 28, 2022; 7:00 pm, CBSSN		at Toledo	L 76–84	13–6 (6–3)	18 – Trimble Jr.	10 – Freeman	4 – 2 tied	Savage Arena (5,489); Toledo, OH
February 4, 2022; 7:30 pm, CBSSN		Miami (OH)	W 66–55	14–6 (7–3)	21 – Freeman	13 – Freeman	4 – Ali	James A. Rhodes Arena (1,794); Akron, OH
February 6, 2022; 2:00 pm, ESPN3		at Miami (OH); Rescheduled from January 8	W 71–59	15–6 (8–3)	21 – Ali	10 – Freeman	3 – Freeman	Millett Hall (1,597); Oxford, OH
February 8, 2022; 8:00 pm, ESPN3		at Northern Illinois	W 70–64	16–6 (9–3)	21 – Freeman	13 – Freeman	5 – Ali	Convocation Center; DeKalb, IL
February 11, 2022; 7:00 pm, ESPN2		Kent State	L 64–66	16–7 (9–4)	21 – Freeman	13 – Freeman	4 – Tribble	James A. Rhodes Arena (3,699); Akron, OH
February 15, 2022; 7:00 pm, ESPN3		at Western Michigan	L 57–61 ^{OT}	16–8 (9–5)	16 – Freeman	18 – Freeman	3 – Freeman	University Arena (1,269); Kalamazoo, MI
February 17, 2022; 6:00 pm, ESPN3		at Northern Illinois; Rescheduled from January 1	L 63–66	16–9 (9–6)	20 – Ali	11 – Freeman	3 – Castaneda	Rhodes Arena (2,076); Akron, OH
February 19, 2022; 3:00 pm, ESPN3		at Eastern Michigan	W 67–48	17–9 (10–6)	17 – Ali	8 – Freeman	3 – Freeman	George Gervin GameAbove Center (1,584); Ypsilanti, MI
February 22, 2022; 7:00 pm, ESPN3		Bowling Green	W 82–68	18–9 (11–6)	17 – 2 tied	11 – Freeman	6 – Ali	James A. Rhodes Arena (1,830); Akron, OH
February 25, 2022; 6:00 pm, ESPN+		at Ohio	W 91–83	19–9 (12–6)	22 – Ali	9 – Freeman	3 – 2 tied	Convocation Center; Athens, OH
March 1, 2022; 7:00 pm, ESPN+		at Ball State	W 79–60	20–9 (13–6)	22 – Castaneda	16 – Freeman	4 – Freeman	Worthen Arena (3,003); Muncie, IN
March 4, 2022; 7:00 pm, ESPN+		Central Michigan	W 57–56	21–9 (14–6)	17 – Castaneda	8 – Dawson	3 – Ali	James A. Rhodes Arena (2,128); Akron, OH
MAC tournament
March 10, 2022; 1:30 pm, ESPN+	(4)	vs. (5) Buffalo; Quarterfinals	W 70–68	22–9	19 – Ali	9 – Freeman	4 – Castaneda	Rocket Mortgage FieldHouse; Cleveland, OH
March 11, 2022; 5:00 pm, CBSSN	(4)	vs. (1) Toledo; Semifinals	W 70–62	23–9	26 – Castaneda	10 – Freeman	4 – Tribble	Rocket Mortgage FieldHouse; Cleveland, OH
March 12, 2022; 7:30 pm, ESPN2	(4)	vs. (2) Kent State; Championship	W 75–55	24–9	23 – Freeman	8 – Freeman	5 – Tribble	Rocket Mortgage FieldHouse (8,361); Cleveland, OH
NCAA tournament
March 17, 2022; 6:50 pm, TBS	(13 E)	vs. (4 E) No. 11 UCLA; First Round	L 53–57	24–10	18 – Castaneda	10 – Freeman	1 – Castaneda	Moda Center (14,217); Portland, OR
*Non-conference game. ^{#}Rankings from AP Poll. (#) Tournament seedings in parentheses. E=East. All times are in Eastern Time.
