= 2021–22 Bowling Green Falcons men's basketball team =

American college basketball season

2021–22 Bowling Green Falcons men's basketball
- Conference: Mid-American Conference
- Record: 13–18 (6–14 MAC)
- Head coach: Michael Huger (7th season)
- Assistant coaches: Kevin Noon (6th season); Brandon Watkins (2nd season); Steven Wright (2nd season)
- Home arena: Stroh Center

2021–22 Mid-American Conference men's basketball standings
	Conf.				Overall
Team	W		L	PCT	W		L	PCT
Toledo	17	–	3	.850	26	–	8	.765
Kent State	16	–	4	.800	23	–	11	.676
Ohio	14	–	6	.700	25	–	10	.714
Akron †	14	–	6	.700	24	–	10	.706
Buffalo	13	–	6	.684	19	–	11	.633
Ball State	9	–	10	.474	14	–	17	.452
Miami (OH)	8	–	12	.400	14	–	18	.438
Central Michigan	6	–	12	.333	7	–	23	.233
Bowling Green	6	–	14	.300	13	–	18	.419
Northern Illinois	6	–	14	.300	9	–	21	.300
Eastern Michigan	5	–	15	.250	10	–	21	.323
Western Michigan	4	–	16	.200	8	–	23	.258
† 2022 MAC tournament winner

The 2021–22 Bowling Green Falcons men's basketball team represented Bowling Green State University in the 2021–22 NCAA Division I men's basketball season. The Falcons, led by seventh-year head coach Michael Huger, played their home games at the Stroh Center in Bowling Green, Ohio as members of the Mid-American Conference (MAC). They finished the season 13–18 overall, 6–14 in MAC play, to finish in a tie for ninth place.

== Previous season ==
The Falcons finished the 2020–21 season 14–12 overall, 10–8 in MAC play, to finish in sixth place in the conference. They received an invitation to the CBI where they lost in the quarterfinals to Stetson.

== Offseason ==
=== Departures ===
Departures
Name	Pos.	Height	Weight	Year	Hometown	Notes
Justin Turner	G	6' 4"	205	Redshirt senior	Detroit, MI	Declared for 2021 NBA draft
Davin Zeigler	G	6' 3"	175	Sophomore	Cleveland, OH	Transferred to Indian Hills Community College

=== Incoming transfers ===
Transfers
Name	Pos.	Height	Weight	Year	Hometown	Previous school
Samari Curtis	G	6' 4"	190	Junior	Xenia, OH	Evansville
Myron Gordon	G	6' 3"	180	Graduate student	Bordentown, NJ	Samford
Brenton Mills	G	6' 3"	185	Sophomore	Allen, TX	Binghamton
Gabe O'Neal	F	6' 7"	240	Junior	Cincinnati, OH	Kent State
Joe Reece	F	6' 9"	215	Junior	St. Louis, MO	Old Dominion

=== 2021 recruiting class ===
College recruiting information
Name	Hometown	School	Height	Weight	Commit date
Ubong Abasi Etim; PF	Richmond, CA	North Little Rock High School	6 ft 9 in (2.06 m)	210 lb (95 kg)	Nov 26, 2020
Ubong Abasi Etim; PF	Recruit ratings: ESPN:				
Overall recruit ranking:
Note: In many cases, Scout, Rivals, 247Sports, On3, and ESPN may conflict in their listings of height and weight.; In these cases, the average was taken. ESPN grades are on a 100-point scale.; Sources: "2021 Team Ranking". Rivals.

== Roster ==
2021–22 Bowling Green Falcons men's basketball team
Players
Coaches

Pos.	#	Name	Height	Weight	Year	Hometown
F	0	Ubong Abasi Etim	6 ft 9 in (2.06 m)	210 lb (95 kg)	Fr	Richmond, CA
G	1	Brenton Mills	6 ft 3 in (1.91 m)	185 lb (84 kg)	So	Allen, TX
G	2	Josiah Fulcher	6 ft 3 in (1.91 m)	185 lb (84 kg)	So	Lima, OH
G	3	Caleb Fields	6 ft 2 in (1.88 m)	185 lb (84 kg)	Sr	Cape May Court House, NJ
G	5	Kaden Metheny	5 ft 11 in (1.8 m)	180 lb (82 kg)	So	Morgantown, WV
G/F	10	Cam Young	6 ft 7 in (2.01 m)	210 lb (95 kg)	So	Swedesboro, NJ
G/F	11	Trey Diggs	6 ft 6 in (1.98 m)	210 lb (95 kg)	GS	Niceville, FL
G	12	Isaac Elsasser (W)	6 ft 4 in (1.93 m)	185 lb (84 kg)	Jr	Bowling Green, OH
G/F	13	Chandler Turner	6 ft 7 in (2.01 m)	210 lb (95 kg)	Jr	Detroit, MI
G	15	Samari Curtis	6 ft 4 in (1.93 m)	190 lb (86 kg)	Jr	Xenia, OH
F	20	Joe Reece	6 ft 9 in (2.06 m)	215 lb (98 kg)	Jr	St. Louis, MO
F	21	Matiss Kulackovskis	6 ft 9 in (2.06 m)	215 lb (98 kg)	RS Sr	Saldus, Latvia
G/F	25	Daeqwon Plowden	6 ft 6 in (1.98 m)	215 lb (98 kg)	Sr	Philadelphia, PA
F	32	Gabe O'Neal	6 ft 7 in (2.01 m)	240 lb (109 kg)	Jr	Cincinnati, OH
G	33	Jackson Watson (W)	6 ft 1 in (1.85 m)	180 lb (82 kg)	So	Libertyville, IL
G	55	Myron Gordon	6 ft 3 in (1.91 m)	180 lb (82 kg)	GS	Bordentown, NJ

Head coach

- Michael Huger (Bowling Green)

Assistant coach(es)

- Kevin Noon (Rider/Bowling Green)
- Brandon Watkins (Penn State)
- Steve Wright (Bowling Green)

Legend

- (C) Team captain
- (S) Suspended
- (I) Ineligible
- (W) Walk-on
- Injured
- Current redshirt

Roster
Last update: November 6, 2024

== Schedule and results ==
Date time, TV	Rank^{#}	Opponent^{#}	Result	Record	Site (attendance) city, state
Exhibition
November 4, 2021*; 7:00 p.m.		Fairmont State	W 91–89 ^{OT}		Stroh Center; Bowling Green, OH
Non-conference regular season
November 9, 2021*; 7:30 p.m., ESPN+		at Western Carolina	L 71–79 ^{OT}	0–1	Ramsey Center (1,862); Cullowhee, NC
November 12, 2021*; 7:00 p.m.		Ohio Wesleyan	W 101–60	1–1	Stroh Center (1,050); Bowling Green, OH
November 15, 2021*; 6:30 p.m., BTN		No. 19 Ohio State; Fort Myers Tip-Off	L 58–89	1–2	Value City Arena (9,808); Columbus, OH
November 19, 2021*; 5:30 p.m., ESPN3		Norfolk State; Fort Myers Tip-Off	L 84–90	1–3	Stroh Center (1,325); Bowling Green, OH
November 23, 2021*; 2:30 p.m.		vs. Milwaukee; Fort Myers Tip-Off	W 82–68	2–3	Suncoast Credit Union Arena (574); Fort Myers, FL
November 24, 2021*; 1:30 p.m.		vs. Southern Utah; Fort Myers Tip-Off	L 73–87	2–4	Suncoast Credit Union Arena (388); Fort Myers, FL
November 28, 2021*; 2:00 p.m., ESPN3		Chicago State	W 75–57	3–4	Stroh Center (1,314); Bowling Green, OH
December 1, 2021*; 7:00 p.m., ESPN+		at Duquesne	W 78–70	4–4	UPMC Cooper Fieldhouse (2,111); Pittsburgh, PA
December 7, 2021*; 7:00 p.m., ESPN3		Oakland	W 73–72	5–4	Stroh Center (2,060); Bowling Green, OH
December 19, 2021*; 2:00 p.m., ESPN3		Robert Morris	W 100–74	6–4	Stroh Center (1,964); Bowling Green, OH
December 21, 2021*; 12:00 p.m.		Carlow	W 129–50	7–4	Stroh Center (1,820); Bowling Green, OH
MAC regular season
January 1, 2022; 6:00 p.m., ESPN3		at Ball State	L 80–81	7–5 (0–1)	Worthen Arena (2,160); Muncie, IN
January 5, 2022; 7:00 p.m., ESPN3		at Buffalo	L 88–99	7–6 (0–2)	Alumni Arena (1,301); Amherst, NY
January 8, 2022; 5:00 p.m., ESPN+		Miami; Rescheduled from January 4	W 87–83 ^{OT}	8–6 (1–2)	Stroh Center (2,179); Bowling Green, OH
January 11, 2022; 7:00 p.m., ESPN3		at Ohio	L 78–85	8–7 (1–3)	Convocation Center (6,811); Athens, OH
January 15, 2022; 5:00 p.m., ESPN3		at Toledo	L 78–91	8–8 (1–4)	Stroh Center (3,366); Bowling Green, OH
January 18, 2022; 8:00 p.m., ESPN3		at Northern Illinois	W 92–83	9–8 (2–4)	Convocation Center (553); DeKalb, IL
January 20, 2022; 7:00 p.m., ESPN3		Akron; Rescheduled from December 29	L 66–91	9–9 (2–5)	Stroh Center (1,867); Bowling Green, OH
January 22, 2022; 2:00 p.m., ESPN3		at Western Michigan	W 82–75	10–9 (3–5)	University Arena (1,462); Kalamazoo, MI
January 25, 2022; 7:00 p.m., ESPN+		Eastern Michigan	W 85–71	11–9 (4–5)	Stroh Center (1,951); Bowling Green, OH
January 29, 2022; 5:00 p.m., ESPN+		Kent State	L 83–91	11–10 (4–6)	Stroh Center (2,475); Bowling Green, OH
February 1, 2022; 7:00 p.m., ESPN+		at Central Michigan	L 74–78	11–11 (4–7)	McGuirk Arena (1,274); Mount Pleasant, MI
February 5, 2022; 5:00 p.m., ESPN3		Northern Illinois	W 87–65	12–11 (5–7)	Stroh Center (1,995); Bowling Green, OH
February 8, 2022; 7:00 p.m., ESPN3		at Kent State	L 68–76	12–12 (5–8)	MAC Center (1,677); Kent, OH
February 12, 2022; 3:30 p.m., ESPN+		Miami	L 78–94	12–13 (5–9)	Millett Hall (4,699); Oxford, OH
February 15, 2022; 7:00 p.m., ESPN+		Buffalo	L 85–112	12–14 (5–10)	Stroh Center (1,910); Bowling Green, OH
February 19, 2022; 5:00 p.m., ESPN3		Ball State	L 82–91	12–15 (5–11)	Stroh Center (1,928); Bowling Green, OH
February 22, 2022; 7:00 p.m., ESPN3		at Akron	L 68–82	12–16 (5–12)	James A. Rhodes Arena (1,830); Akron, OH
February 26, 2022; 5:00 p.m., ESPN3		Western Michigan	L 67–78	12–17 (5–13)	Stroh Center (2,825); Bowling Green, OH
March 1, 2022; 7:00 p.m., ESPN+		Ohio	W 80–77	13–17 (6–13)	Stroh Center (2,068); Bowling Green, OH
March 4, 2022; 7:00 p.m., ESPN+		at Toledo	L 56–96	13–18 (6–14)	Savage Arena (6,712); Toledo, OH
*Non-conference game. ^{#}Rankings from AP poll. (#) Tournament seedings in parentheses. All times are in Eastern.
