= Jacob Bullock =

American basketball head coach

Personal information
- Born: 1994 (age 31–32)
- Position: Guard
- Coaching career: 2020–present

Career history

Coaching
- 2020–2022: Western Michigan Broncos (assistant)

Jacob Bullock (born c. 1994) is an American basketball head coach who is currently an assistant coach of Western Michigan Broncos under head coach Clayton Bates. He played college basketball at Aquinas College, where he ranked sixth all-time in points in school history.

== Career ==
On June 29, 2020, it was reported that Bullock, after spending a few years as the director of basketball operations for the Western Michigan Broncos, he would be promoted to being an assistant coach.

Bates, in an interview, stated, "Jake is passionate about the teaching the game of basketball and his ability to communicate with our student-athletes makes him perfect for this role."
