= Enrique Freeman =

American basketball player (born 2000)

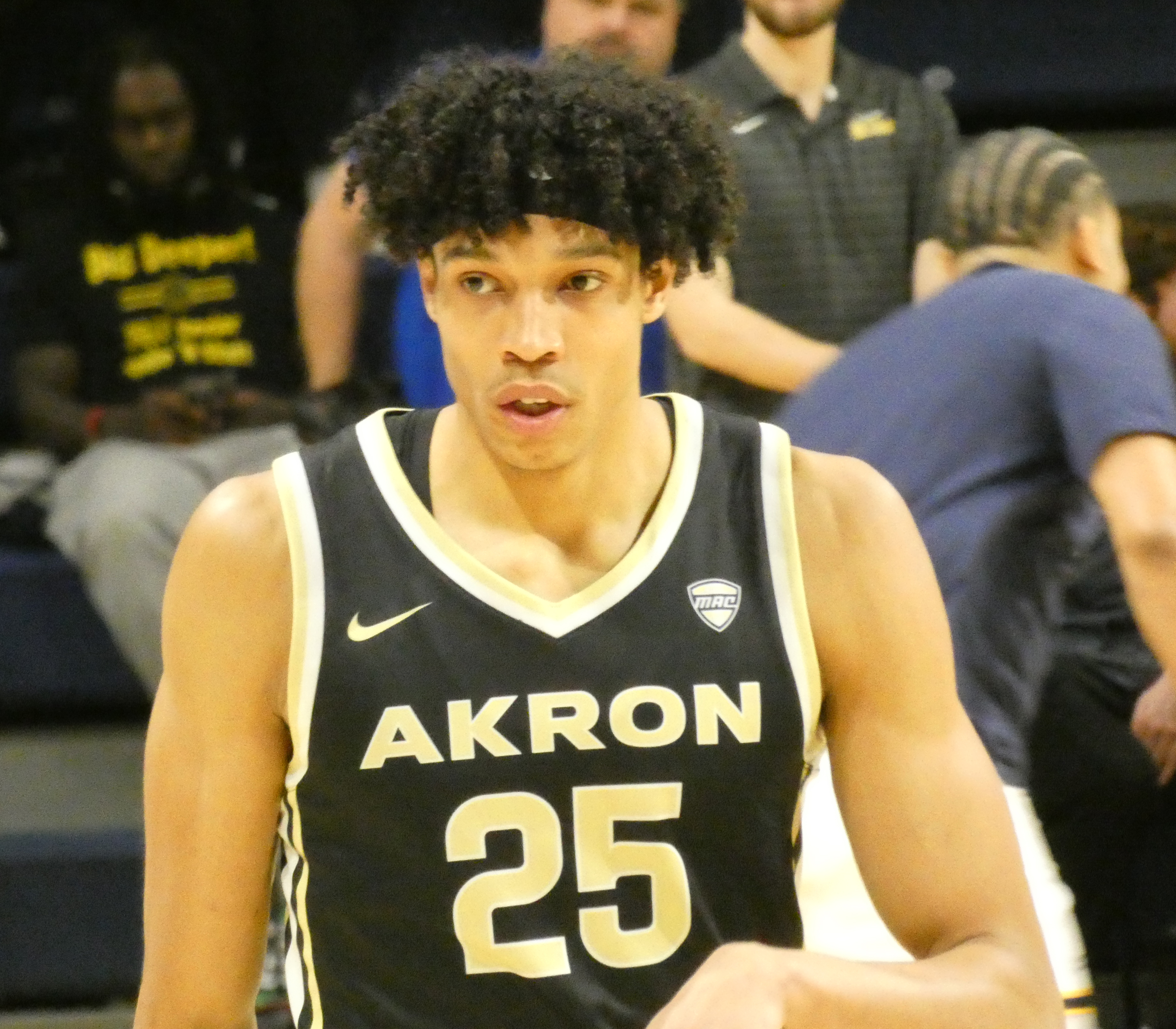
- Freeman with Akron in 2024

No. 25 – Iowa Wolves
- Position: Power forward
- League: NBA G League

Personal information
- Born: July 29, 2000 (age 26) Cleveland, Ohio, U.S.
- Listed height: 6 ft 7 in (2.01 m)
- Listed weight: 220 lb (100 kg)

Career information
- High school: St. Martin de Porres (Cleveland, Ohio)
- College: Akron (2019–2024)
- NBA draft: 2024: 2nd round, 50th overall pick
- Drafted by: Indiana Pacers
- Playing career: 2024–present

Career history
- 2024–2025: Indiana Pacers
- 2024–2025: →Indiana Mad Ants
- 2025–2026: Minnesota Timberwolves
- 2025–2026: →Iowa Wolves
- 2026–present: Iowa Wolves

Career highlights
- AP honorable mention All-American (2024); MAC Player of the Year (2024); 2× First-team All-MAC (2023, 2024); Second-team All-MAC (2022); MAC Defensive Player of the Year (2022); 4× MAC All-Defensive team (2021–2024); NCAA rebounding leader (2024); 2× MAC tournament MVP (2022, 2024)
- Stats at NBA.com
- Stats at Basketball Reference

Enrique Gabriel Freeman (born July 29, 2000) is an American professional basketball player for the Iowa Wolves of the NBA G League. He played college basketball for the Akron Zips.

== College career ==
After a prep career at St. Martin de Porres High School in Cleveland, Freeman had no college basketball offers. He accepted an academic scholarship to the University of Akron and at the urging of friends and family, tried out for a walk-on spot with the school's basketball team, earning a roster spot. He played sparingly as a freshman, totaling 13 minutes on the season. He grew four inches (10 cm) between his first and second years and earned a scholarship and a starting role for the Zips. He earned his first Mid-American Conference (MAC) all-defensive team honor.

As Freeman established himself as one of the top defensive players in the MAC during the 2021–22 season, his offense began to develop as well. He averaged a double-double for the season and led the nation in field goal percentage. He earned second-team All-MAC honors and was named the conference Defensive Player of the Year. He led the Zips to a MAC tournament title, and was named the tournament MVP.

Following the 2022–23 season, Freeman declared for the 2023 NBA draft but retained his college eligibility. He worked out for several teams but ultimately decided to return to Akron for his senior season.

Entering his final season at Akron, Freeman was named preseason All-MAC and added to the 20-man watch list for the Karl Malone Award for top power forward in the nation. On February 2, 2024, he was named to the 10-man finalist pool for the award.

At the close of the regular season, Freeman was named MAC Player of the Year.

== Professional career ==
On June 27, 2024, Freeman was selected with the 50th overall pick by the Indiana Pacers in the 2024 NBA draft. On August 8, Freeman signed a two-way contract with the team. Freeman made his NBA debut on October 23, in a 115–109 win over the Detroit Pistons, scoring two points. He appeared in 22 games (including one start) for Indiana during his rookie campaign, averaging 2.1 points and 1.4 rebounds.

On August 1, 2025, Freeman signed a two-way contract with the Minnesota Timberwolves. He made four appearances for the Timberwolves during the 2025–26 NBA season, recording averages of 3.3 points, 2.5 rebounds, and 0.5 assists.

On July 2, 2026, Freeman re–signed with Minnesota on a two–way contract. On October 17, 2026, Freeman was waived.

== Career statistics ==
Legend
GP	Games played	GS	Games started	MPG	Minutes per game
FG%	Field goal percentage	3P%	3-point field goal percentage	FT%	Free throw percentage
RPG	Rebounds per game	APG	Assists per game	SPG	Steals per game
BPG	Blocks per game	PPG	Points per game	**Bold**	Career high

*	Led NCAA Division I

=== NBA ===
Year	Team	GP	GS	MPG	FG%	3P%	FT%	RPG	APG	SPG	BPG	PPG
2024–25	Indiana	**22**	**1**	8.2	.432	.100	.684	1.4	.4	.1	.1	2.1
2025–26	Minnesota	4	0	**9.3**	**.500**	**.500**	**.750**	**2.5**	**.5**	**.5**	**.8**	**3.3**
Career		26	1	8.4	.444	.214	.696	1.5	.4	.2	.2	2.3

=== College ===
Year	Team	GP	GS	MPG	FG%	3P%	FT%	RPG	APG	SPG	BPG	PPG
2019–20	Akron	7	0	1.9	**1.000**	—	**.750**	.6	.0	.0	.1	.7
2020–21	Akron	23	20	22.3	.740	—	.659	9.2	.3	.5	**1.9**	7.9
2021–22	Akron	34	34	28.8	.665	.000	.649	10.8	1.4	.5	1.1	13.2
2022–23	Akron	33	33	31.2	.616	.333	.616	11.2	**1.9**	.6	1.2	16.8
2023–24	Akron	**35**	**35**	**32.5**	.584	**.370**	.728	**12.9***	1.6	**.8**	1.7	**18.6**
Career		132	122	27.8	.628	.350	.670	10.6	1.3	.6	1.4	14.0

== National team career ==
Freeman plays for the Puerto Rico national basketball team.

== Personal life ==
Freeman is of Puerto Rican descent.
