= 2021–22 Illinois State Redbirds men's basketball team =

American college basketball season

2021–22 Illinois State Redbirds men's basketball
- Conference: Missouri Valley Conference
- Record: 13–20 (5–13 MVC)
- Head coach: Dan Muller (10th season; 26 games); Brian Jones, interim (7 games)
- Associate head coach: Brian Jones (prior to interim head coach) (3rd season)
- Assistant coaches: Marcus Belcher (3rd season); Rob Johnson (1st season)
- Home arena: Doug Collins Court at Redbird Arena

2021–22 Missouri Valley Conference men's basketball standings
| | Conf. | | | | Overall |
| Team | W | | L | PCT | W | | L | PCT |
|---|---|---|---|---|---|---|---|---|
| Northern Iowa | 14 | – | 4 | .778 | 20 | – | 12 | .625 |
| Missouri State | 13 | – | 5 | .722 | 23 | – | 11 | .676 |
| Drake | 13 | – | 5 | .722 | 25 | – | 11 | .694 |
| Loyola Chicago † | 13 | – | 5 | .722 | 25 | – | 8 | .758 |
| Bradley | 11 | – | 7 | .611 | 17 | – | 14 | .548 |
| Southern Illinois | 9 | – | 9 | .500 | 16 | – | 14 | .533 |
| Valparaiso | 6 | – | 12 | .333 | 14 | – | 18 | .438 |
| Illinois State | 5 | – | 13 | .278 | 13 | – | 20 | .394 |
| Indiana State | 4 | – | 14 | .222 | 11 | – | 20 | .355 |
| Evansville | 2 | – | 16 | .111 | 6 | – | 24 | .200 |
† 2022 MVC tournament winner

The 2021–22 Illinois State Redbirds men's basketball team represented Illinois State University during the 2021–22 NCAA Division I men's basketball season. The Redbirds played their home games at Doug Collins Court at Redbird Arena in Normal, Illinois as members of the Missouri Valley Conference. The team finished the season 13–20, 5–13 in MVC play to finish in eighth place. They defeated Indiana State in the opening round of the MVC tournament before losing to Northern Iowa in the quarterfinals.

Twenty-six games into his tenth season as head coach, Dan Muller was notified by the school he would not be retained; however, the school stated he would be allowed to finish out the remainder of the season. A day later, Muller announced that he would step aside immediately with associate head coach Brian Jones then being named interim coach for the remainder of the season. On March 7, 2022, the school named Ohio State assistant coach Ryan Pedon as the team's new head coach.

== Previous season ==
In a season limited due to the ongoing COVID-19 pandemic, the Redbirds finished the 2020–21 season 7–18, 4–14 in MVC play to finish in 10th place. In the MVC tournament, they lost to Northern Iowa in the first round.

== Offseason ==
=== Departures ===
| Name | # | Pos. | Height | Weight | Year | Hometown | Comment |
|---|---|---|---|---|---|---|---|
| DJ Horne | 0 | G | 6'1" | 175 | Sophomore | Raleigh, NC | Arizona State |
| Dedric Boyd | 1 | G | 6'4" | 195 | RS Junior | Brownsville, TN | Tennessee State |
| Dusan Mahorcic | 21 | F | 6'10" | 240 | Junior | Belgrade, Serbia | Utah |

=== 2021 recruiting class ===
College recruiting information
| Name | Hometown | School | Height | Weight | Commit date |
|---|---|---|---|---|---|
| Julian Samuels; G | Annawan, IL | Central Pointe Christian Academy | 6 ft 1 in (1.85 m) | 160 lb (73 kg) | |
| Julian Samuels; G | Recruit ratings: Scout: Rivals: 247Sports: (NR) | | | | |
| Elijah Williams; G | Lilburn, GA | Providence Christian Academy | 6 ft 7 in (2.01 m) | 180 lb (82 kg) | |
| Elijah Williams; G | Recruit ratings: Scout: Rivals: 247Sports: (NR) | | | | |
Overall recruit ranking:
Note: In many cases, Scout, Rivals, 247Sports, On3, and ESPN may conflict in their listings of height and weight.; In these cases, the average was taken. ESPN grades are on a 100-point scale.; Sources: "2021 Team Ranking". Rivals.

=== Incoming transfers ===
| Name | Pos. | Height | Weight | Year | Hometown | Prior school |
|---|---|---|---|---|---|---|
| Mark Freeman | G | 5'11" | 165 | Junior | Memphis, TN | Tennessee State |
| Kendall Lewis | F | 6'7" | 190 | Junior | Snellville, GA | Appalachian State |
| Ryan Schmitt | F | 6'11" | 225 | Junior | Van Meter, IA | Des Moines Area CC |
| Liam McChesney | F | 6'10" | 200 | RS Sophomore | Prince Rupert, BC | Utah State |

== Roster ==
2021–22 Illinois State Redbirds men's basketball team
Players
Coaches

| Pos. | # | Name | Height | Weight | Year | Previous school | Hometown |
|---|---|---|---|---|---|---|---|
| G | 0 | Mark Freeman | 5 ft 11 in (1.8 m) | 165 lb (75 kg) | Jr | Southwind HS; Tennessee State | Memphis, TN |
| F | 1 | Sy Chatman | 6 ft 8 in (2.03 m) | 230 lb (104 kg) | RS Jr | Cretin-Derham HS; Massachusetts | Minneapolis, MN |
| G | 2 | Josiah Strong | 6 ft 4 in (1.93 m) | 195 lb (88 kg) | Sr | Champlin Park HS; Navy; Iowa Western Community College | Brooklyn Park, MN |
| G | 3 | Howard Fleming Jr. | 6 ft 5 in (1.96 m) | 200 lb (91 kg) | So | Male HS | Louisville, KY |
| F | 4 | Abdou Ndiaye | 6 ft 9 in (2.06 m) | 200 lb (91 kg) | RS Jr | The Nation Christian Academy | Louga, Senegal |
| G | 5 | Julian Samuels (W) | 6 ft 1 in (1.85 m) | 160 lb (73 kg) | Fr | Annawan HS; Central Pointe Christian Academy | Annawan, IL |
| G | 10 | Emon Washington | 6 ft 5 in (1.96 m) | 190 lb (86 kg) | So | South Cobb HS | Atlanta, GA |
| F | 11 | Alston Andrews | 6 ft 9 in (2.06 m) | 230 lb (104 kg) | So | Ocoee HS | Detroit, MI |
| G | 12 | Antonio Reeves | 6 ft 6 in (1.98 m) | 185 lb (84 kg) | Jr | Simeon Career Academy | Chicago, IL |
| F | 13 | Liam McChesney | 6 ft 10 in (2.08 m) | 200 lb (91 kg) | RS So | Charles Hays Secondary School; Utah State | Prince Rupert, BC |
| G | 14 | Nik Stadelman (W) | 6 ft 0 in (1.83 m) | 185 lb (84 kg) | So | Guilford HS | Rockford, IL |
| F | 22 | Kendall Lewis | 6 ft 8 in (2.03 m) | 210 lb (95 kg) | Jr | Shiloh HS; Appalachian State | Snellville, GA |
| F | 23 | Harouna Sissoko | 6 ft 7 in (2.01 m) | 215 lb (98 kg) | RS So | Grand View Christian School | Kayes, Mali |
| G | 24 | Jayden Johnson (W) | 6 ft 6 in (1.98 m) | 210 lb (95 kg) | So | Batavia HS | Batavia, IL |
| F | 25 | Alex Kotov | 6 ft 10 in (2.08 m) | 230 lb (104 kg) | Jr | Montverde Academy; Palm Beach State College; Daytona State College | Moscow, Russia |
| G | 34 | Malcolm Miller (W) | 6 ft 4 in (1.93 m) | 210 lb (95 kg) | RS So | Shelbyville HS | Shelbyville, IL |
| G | 45 | Elijah Williams (W) | 6 ft 5 in (1.96 m) | 195 lb (88 kg) | Fr | Providence Christian Academy | Lawrenceville, GA |
| F | 50 | Ryan Schmitt | 6 ft 11 in (2.11 m) | 225 lb (102 kg) | Jr | Van Meter HS; Des Moines Area CC | Van Meter, IA |

Head coach

- Dan Muller (Illinois State) - ending February 13, 2022
- Brian Jones (Northern Iowa) - beginning February 14, 2022

Assistant coach(es)

- Brian Jones (Northern Iowa) - ending February 13, 2022
- Marcus Belcher (Southern Illinois)
- Rob Johnson (Norfolk State)

Legend

- (C) Team captain
- (S) Suspended
- (I) Ineligible
- (W) Walk-on
- Injured
- Current redshirt

Roster
Last update: February 15, 2022

== Schedule and results ==
| Date time, TV | Rank^{#} | Opponent^{#} | Result | Record | High points | High rebounds | High assists | Site (attendance) city, state |
Exhibition
| November 4, 2021*; 7:00 pm | | Davenport | W 85–59 | | 34 – Reeves | 8 – Lewis | 10 – Freeman | Redbird Arena; Normal, IL |
Regular season
| November 9, 2021*; 7:00 pm, ESPN3 | | UNC Wilmington | W 68–63 | 1–0 | 29 – Reeves | 10 – Chatman | 3 – Tied | Redbird Arena (2,642); Normal, IL |
| November 12, 2021*; 5:00 pm, ESPN3 | | at Eastern Michigan | L 98–103 ^{2OT} | 1–1 | 32 – Reeves | 13 – Chatman | 2 – Tied | George Gervin; GameAbove Center (1,905); Ypsilanti, MI |
| November 16, 2021*; 7:00 pm, ESPN3 | | Murray State | L 65–77 | 1–2 | 19 – Reeves | 7 – Lewis | 4 – Freeman | Redbird Arena (2,904); Normal, IL |
| November 20, 2021*; 6:00 pm, ESPN+ | | Bucknell; Cancún Challenge; Campus Game | W 105–100 ^{OT} | 2–2 | 34 – Freeman | 11 – Chatman | 7 – Freeman | Redbird Arena (2,576); Normal, IL |
| November 23, 2021*; 7:30 pm, CBSSN | | vs. Saint Louis; Cancún Challenge; Riviera Division (Semifinal) | L 76–82 | 2–3 | 20 – Reeves | 4 – Reeves | 6 – Fleming Jr. | Riviera Maya (103); Cancún, Mexico |
| November 24, 2021*; 5:00 pm, CBSSN | | vs. Buffalo; Cancún Challenge; Riviera Division (Consolation) | L 90–106 | 2–4 | 22 – Lewis | 5 – Tied | 4 – Strong | Riviera Maya (144); Cancún, Mexico |
| November 27, 2021*; 8:00 pm, Marquee | | Purdue Northwest | W 81–71 | 3–4 | 20 – Reeves | 12 – Chatman | 7 – Freeman | Redbird Arena (1,024); Normal, IL |
| December 1, 2021; 7:00 pm, ESPN+ | | Missouri State | W 79–74 ^{OT} | 4–4 (1–0) | 22 – Reeves | 6 – 3 Tied | 5 – Fleming Jr. | Redbird Arena (2,902); Normal, IL |
| December 4, 2021*; 3:00 pm, ESPN3 | | Jackson State | L 55–61 | 4–5 | 14 – Reeves | 6 – Lewis | 4 – Freeman | Redbird Arena (3,089); Normal, IL |
| December 11, 2021*; 2:00 pm, ESPN+ | | at Chicago State | W 81–71 | 5–5 | 28 – Reeves | 6 – Lewis | 4 – Freeman | Emil and Patricia Jones; Convocation Center (267); Chicago, IL |
| December 14, 2021*; 7:00 pm, ESPN+ | | Quincy | W 81–63 | 6–5 | 19 – Reeves | 7 – Chatman | 4 – Freeman | Redbird Arena (2,039); Normal, IL |
| December 18, 2021*; 3:00 pm, Marquee | | Ball State | W 85–64 | 7–5 | 23 – Strong | 9 – Lewis | 6 – Freeman | Redbird Arena (2,704); Normal, IL |
| December 21, 2021*; 2:00 pm, ESPN+ | | UTSA | W 81–64 | 8–5 | 21 – Reeves | 10 – Reeves | 8 – Freeman | Redbird Arena (2.345); Normal, IL |
| December 29, 2021*; 7:00 pm, BTN | | at No. 24 Wisconsin | L 85–89 | 8–6 | 23 – Reeves | 7 – Chatman | 3 – Tied | Kohl Center (15,718); Madison, WI |
| January 2, 2022; 1:00 pm, ESPN+ | | at Valparaiso | L 76–81 ^{OT} | 8–7 (1–1) | 24 – Reeves | 7 – Tied | 4 – Strong | Athletics–Recreation Center (1,267); Valparaiso, IN |
| January 12, 2022; 7:00 pm, MVC TV | | at Drake | L 75–86 | 8–8 (1–2) | 20 – Lewis | 5 – Tied | 6 – Strong | The Knapp Center (2,702); Des Moines, IA |
| January 16, 2022; 7:00 pm, Marquee | | Bradley; I–74 Rivalry | W 74–65 | 9–8 (2–2) | 24 – Reeves | 7 – Chatman | 4 – Strong | Redbird Arena (4,072); Normal, IL |
| January 19, 2022; 7:00 pm, ESPN+ | | at Missouri State | L 63–88 | 9–9 (2–3) | 19 – Freeman | 7 – Chatman | 4 – Strong | JQH Arena (3,362); Springfield, MO |
| January 21, 2022; 6:00 pm, ESPN+ | | Evansville | W 94–56 | 10–9 (3–3) | 16 – Reeves | 5 – Fleming Jr. | 4 – Fleming Jr. | Redbird Arena (2,721); Normal, IL |
| January 23, 2022; 1:00 pm, MVC TV | | at Evansville (Rescheduled from January 9) | L 53–56 | 10–10 (3–4) | 23 – Reeves | 5 – Strong | 3 – Freeman | Ford Center (3,354); Evansville, IN |
| January 26, 2022; 7:00 pm, ESPN+ | | Drake | L 88–89 ^{OT} | 10–11 (3–5) | 25 – Reeves | 11 – Lewis | 10 – Freeman | Redbird Arena (3,515); Normal, IL |
| January 29, 2022; 1:00 pm, ESPN+ | | at Northern Iowa | L 64–79 | 10–12 (3–6) | 19 – McChesney | 8 – McChesney | 4 – Strong | McLeod Center (2,669); Cedar Falls, IA |
| February 2, 2022; 7:00 pm, ESPN+ | | at Loyola Chicago | L 64–78 | 10–13 (3–7) | 20 – Reeves | 5 – Fleming Jr. | 3 – Freeman | Joseph J. Gentile Arena (3,097); Chicago, IL |
| February 5, 2022; 7:00 pm, Marquee | | Southern Illinois | L 69–75 | 10–14 (3–8) | 18 – Strong | 8 – McChesney | 5 – Reeves | Redbird Arena (4,276); Normal, IL |
| February 9, 2022; 7:00 pm, Marquee | | Valparaiso | W 78–75 ^{OT} | 11–14 (4–8) | 34 – Reeves | 10 – McChesney | 3 – Freeman | Redbird Arena (2,443); Normal, IL |
| February 12, 2022; 1:00 pm, ESPN+ | | at Indiana State | L 57–60 | 11–15 (4–9) | 13 – McChesney | 10 – Lewis | 4 – Fleming Jr. | Hulman Center (2,766); Terre Haute, IN |
| February 15, 2022; 7:00 pm, ESPN+ | | Northern Iowa | L 70–72 | 11–16 (4–10) | 27 – Reeves | 14 – Lewis | 4 – Lewis | Redbird Arena (3,039); Normal, IL |
| February 19, 2022; 1:00 pm, MVC TV | | at Bradley; I–74 Rivalry | L 64–72 | 11–17 (4–11) | 20 – Reeves | 6 – Freeman | 2 – Tied | Carver Arena (6,902); Peoria, IL |
| February 21, 2022; 7:00 pm, ESPN+ | | Loyola Chicago (Rescheduled from January 5) | L 50–59 | 11–18 (4–12) | 15 – Reeves | 7 – Fleming Jr. | 2 – Tied | Redbird Arena (3,354); Normal, IL |
| February 23, 2022; 7:00 pm, ESPN+ | | at Southern Illinois | L 69–90 | 11–19 (4–13) | 18 – Reeves | 6 – Lewis | 5 – Freeman | Banterra Center (4,390); Carbondale, IL |
| February 26, 2022; 3:00 pm, ESPN+ | | Indiana State | W 86–66 | 12–19 (5–13) | 28 – Reeves | 6 – Reeves | 6 – Freeman | Redbird Arena (3,665); Normal, IL |
MVC Tournament
| March 3, 2022; 6:00 pm, MVC TV | (8) | vs. (9) Indiana State; Opening Round | W 58–53 | 13–19 | 15 – Reeves | 8 – Lewis | 4 – Fleming Jr. | Enterprise Center (2,904); St. Louis, MO |
| March 4, 2022; 12:00 pm, MVC TV | (8) | vs. (1) Northern Iowa; Quarterfinal | L 65–78 | 13–20 | 20 – Fleming Jr. | 6 – Strong | 4 – Reeves | Enterprise Center (5,394); St. Louis, MO |
*Non-conference game. ^{#}Rankings from AP Poll. (#) Tournament seedings in parentheses. All times are in Central Time.
