= 2020–21 Loyola Ramblers men's basketball team =

American college basketball season

2020–21 Loyola Ramblers men's basketball

Missouri Valley regular season and tournament champions

NCAA tournament, Sweet Sixteen
- Conference: Missouri Valley Conference

Ranking
- Coaches: No. 12
- AP: No. 17
- Record: 26–5 (16–2 MVC)
- Head coach: Porter Moser (10th season)
- Assistant coaches: Jermaine Kimbrough; Matt Gordon; Drew Valentine
- Home arena: Joseph J. Gentile Arena

2020–21 Missouri Valley Conference men's basketball standings
	Conf.				Overall
Team	W		L	PCT	W		L	PCT
No. 17 Loyola Chicago †	16	–	2	.889	26	–	5	.839
Drake	15	–	3	.833	26	–	5	.839
Missouri State	12	–	6	.667	17	–	7	.708
Indiana State	11	–	7	.611	15	–	10	.600
Evansville	7	–	11	.389	9	–	16	.360
Valparaiso	7	–	11	.389	10	–	18	.357
Northern Iowa	7	–	11	.389	10	–	15	.400
Bradley	6	–	12	.333	12	–	16	.429
Southern Illinois	5	–	13	.278	12	–	14	.462
Illinois State	4	–	14	.222	7	–	18	.280
† 2021 MVC tournament winner Rankings from AP poll

The 2020–21 Loyola Ramblers men's basketball team represented Loyola University Chicago during the 2020–21 NCAA Division I men's basketball season. The Ramblers, led by 10th-year head coach Porter Moser, played their home games at the Joseph J. Gentile Arena in Chicago, Illinois as members of the Missouri Valley Conference. They finished the season 26–5, 16–2 in MVC play to win the regular season championship. They defeated Southern Illinois, Illinois State, and Drake to win the MVC tournament championship. As a result, they received the conference's automatic bid to the NCAA tournament as a No. 8 seed in the Midwest region. There they defeated No. 9-seeded Georgia Tech and upset No. 1-seeded Illinois to advance to the Sweet Sixteen. In the Sweet Sixteen, they lost to Oregon State.

On April 3, 2021, Moser left Loyola to accept the head coaching position at Oklahoma. A few days later, the school announced that assistant coach Drew Valentine would take over as the Ramblers' head coach.

== Previous season ==
The Ramblers finished the 2019–20 season 21–11, 13–5 in MVC play to finish in second place. They lost in the quarterfinals of the MVC tournament to Valparaiso. All postseason play was canceled due to the ongoing COVID-19 pandemic.

== Offseason ==
=== Departures ===
Name	Number	Pos.	Height	Weight	Year	Hometown	Reason for departure
Bruno Skokna	4	G	6'4"	175	Senior	Zagreb, Croatia	Graduated
Jalon Pipkins	50	G	6'4"	180	Junior	Paris, TX	Transferred to Purdue Fort Wayne

=== Incoming transfers ===
Name	Number	Pos.	Height	Weight	Year	Hometown	Previous School
Damezi Anderson	35	F	6'7"	225	Junior	South Bend, IN	Transferred from Indiana.

=== 2020 recruiting class ===
College recruiting information
Name	Hometown	School	Height	Weight	Commit date
Jacob Hutson; C	Edina, MN	Edina (MN)	6 ft 10 in (2.08 m)	240 lb (110 kg)	Sep 27, 2018
Jacob Hutson; C	Recruit ratings: (N/R)				
Baylor Hebb; PG / SG	Colleyville, TX	Heritage (TX)	6 ft 2 in (1.88 m)	170 lb (77 kg)	Sep 9, 2019
Baylor Hebb; PG / SG	Recruit ratings: Rivals: 247Sports: ESPN: (N/R)				
Overall recruit ranking: 247Sports: 158
Note: In many cases, Scout, Rivals, 247Sports, On3, and ESPN may conflict in their listings of height and weight.; In these cases, the average was taken. ESPN grades are on a 100-point scale.; Sources: "2020 Loyola Ramblers Recruiting Class". ESPN.; "2020 Team Ranking". Rivals.

== Roster ==
2020–21 Loyola Ramblers men's basketball team
Players
Coaches

Pos.	#	Name	Height	Weight	Year	Previous school	Hometown
G	0	Paxson Wojcik	6 ft 4 in (1.93 m)	185 lb (84 kg)	So	La Lumiere	Charleston, SC
G	1	Lucas Williamson	6 ft 4 in (1.93 m)	205 lb (93 kg)	Sr	Whitney Young	Chicago, IL
G	2	Jake Baughman (W)	6 ft 3 in (1.91 m)	180 lb (82 kg)	RS Sr	Central Catholic	Bloomington, IL
G	4	Braden Norris	6 ft 0 in (1.83 m)	180 lb (82 kg)	RS So	Hilliard Bradley; Oakland	Hilliard, OH
G	5	Keith Clemons	6 ft 1 in (1.85 m)	180 lb (82 kg)	Sr	Wesley Christian; Vincennes	Norcross, GA
F	10	Tom Welch	6 ft 8 in (2.03 m)	220 lb (100 kg)	So	Naperville North	Naperville, IL
G	12	Marquise Kennedy	6 ft 1 in (1.85 m)	175 lb (79 kg)	So	Brother Rice	Chicago, IL
G	13	Baylor Hebb	6 ft 2 in (1.88 m)	170 lb (77 kg)	Fr	Heritage	Colleyville, TX
C	22	Jacob Hutson	6 ft 10 in (2.08 m)	240 lb (109 kg)	Fr	Edina	Edina, MN
G	23	Cooper Kaifes	6 ft 3 in (1.91 m)	195 lb (88 kg)	RS So	Mill Valley	Shawnee, KS
G/F	24	Tate Hall	6 ft 6 in (1.98 m)	220 lb (100 kg)	RS Sr	Greenfield-Central; Indianapolis	Greenfield, IN
C	25	Cameron Krutwig	6 ft 9 in (2.06 m)	255 lb (116 kg)	Sr	Jacobs	Algonquin, IL
F	30	Aher Uguak	6 ft 7 in (2.01 m)	225 lb (102 kg)	RS Sr	Harry Ainlay; New Mexico	Edmonton, AB
G	31	Sami Ismail (W)	6 ft 1 in (1.85 m)	182 lb (83 kg)	Jr	Carl Sandburg	Orland Park, IL
F	33	Franklin Agunanne	6 ft 9 in (2.06 m)	245 lb (111 kg)	Jr	La Lumiere	Abuja, Nigeria
F	35	Damezi Anderson	6 ft 7 in (2.01 m)	225 lb (102 kg)	Jr	Riley; Indiana	South Bend, IN
F	45	Will Alcock (W)	6 ft 7 in (2.01 m)	205 lb (93 kg)	Jr	Zionsville Community	Zionsville, IN

Head coach

- Porter Moser (Creighton)

Assistant coach(es)

- Jermaine Kimbrough (Virginia Tech)
- Matt Gordon (Illinois State)
- Drew Valentine (Oakland)

Legend

- (C) Team captain
- (S) Suspended
- (I) Ineligible
- (W) Walk-on
- Injured
- Current redshirt

Roster

== Schedule and results ==
Date time, TV	Rank^{#}	Opponent^{#}	Result	Record	Site (attendance) city, state
Regular season
December 5, 2020*; 2:00 pm, ESPN3		Lewis	W 76–48	1–0	Joseph J. Gentile Arena; Chicago, IL
December 9, 2020*; 2:00 pm, ESPN+		Chicago State	W 88–51	2–0	Joseph J. Gentile Arena; Chicago, IL
December 13, 2020*; 1:00 pm, ESPN+		at UIC	W 77–66	3–0	Credit Union 1 Arena; Chicago, IL
December 15, 2020*; 7:00 pm, BTN		at No. 12 Wisconsin	L 63–77	3–1	Kohl Center; Madison, WI
December 18, 2020*; 5:00 pm, ESPN+		vs. Richmond	L 73–75	3–2	Indiana Convention Center; Indianapolis, IN
December 22, 2020*; 12:00 pm, ESPN+		St. Francis (IL)	W 92–55	4–2	Joseph J. Gentile Arena; Chicago, IL
December 27, 2020; 3:00 pm, ESPN+		Illinois State	W 90–60	5–2 (1–0)	Joseph J. Gentile Arena; Chicago, IL
December 28, 2020; 7:00 pm, CBSSN		Illinois State	W 86–55	6–2 (2–0)	Joseph J. Gentile Arena; Chicago, IL
January 2, 2021*; 6:30 pm, ESPN+		North Texas	W 57–49	7–2	Joseph J. Gentile Arena; Chicago, IL
January 10, 2021; 5:30 pm, ESPN2		at Indiana State	L 71–76	7–3 (2–1)	Hulman Center (80); Terre Haute, IN
January 11, 2021; 6:00 pm, CBSSN		at Indiana State	W 58–48	8–3 (3–1)	Hulman Center (90); Terre Haute, IN
January 16, 2021; 5:00 pm, ESPN2		Northern Iowa	W 72–57	9–3 (4–1)	Joseph J. Gentile Arena; Chicago, IL
January 17, 2021; 4:00 pm, ESPN		Northern Iowa	W 88–46	10–3 (5–1)	Joseph J. Gentile Arena; Chicago, IL
January 20, 2021; 6:00 pm, ESPN+		at Valparaiso	W 75–39	11–3 (6–1)	Athletics–Recreation Center (95); Valparaiso, IN
January 24, 2021; 3:00 pm, ESPN+		at Bradley	W 69–56	12–3 (7–1)	Carver Arena; Peoria, IL
January 25, 2021; 6:00 pm, CBSSN		at Bradley	W 65–58	13–3 (8–1)	Carver Arena; Peoria, IL
January 31, 2021; 2:00 pm, CBSSN		at Missouri State	W 72–46	14–3 (9–1)	JQH Arena (1,505); Springfield, MO
February 1, 2021; 7:00 pm, ESPN+		at Missouri State	W 70–50	15–3 (10–1)	JQH Arena (1,122); Springfield, MO
February 6, 2021; 1:00 pm, ESPN+		Evansville	W 68–55	16–3 (11–1)	Joseph J. Gentile Arena; Chicago, IL
February 7, 2021; 1:00 pm, ESPN+		Evansville	W 69–58	17–3 (12–1)	Joseph J. Gentile Arena; Chicago, IL
February 13, 2021; 11:00 am, ESPN2	No. 22	at Drake	W 81–54	18–3 (13–1)	Knapp Center (864); Des Moines, IA
February 14, 2021; 2:00 pm, ESPN2	No. 22	at Drake	L 50–51 ^{OT}	18–4 (13–2)	Knapp Center (921); Des Moines, IA
February 17, 2021; 7:00 pm, ESPN+	No. 22	Valparaiso	W 54–52	19–4 (14–2)	Joseph J. Gentile Arena; Chicago, IL
February 26, 2021; 8:00 pm, CBSSN	No. 21	Southern Illinois	W 60–52	20–4 (15–2)	Joseph J. Gentile Arena; Chicago, IL
February 27, 2021; 5:00 pm, ESPN2	No. 21	Southern Illinois	W 65–58 ^{OT}	21–4 (16–2)	Joseph J. Gentile Arena; Chicago, IL
MVC tournament
March 5, 2021; 11:00 am, ESPN+	(1) No. 20	vs. (9) Southern Illinois; Quarterfinals	W 73–49	22–4	Enterprise Center (830); St. Louis, MO
March 6, 2021; 12:00 pm, CBSSN	(1) No. 20	vs. (4) Indiana State; Semifinals	W 65–49	23–4	Enterprise Center (938); St. Louis, MO
March 7, 2021; 1:00 pm, CBS	(1) No. 20	vs. (2) Drake; Championship	W 75–65	24–4	Enterprise Center (1,265); St. Louis, MO
NCAA tournament
March 19, 2021; 3:00 pm, TBS	(8 MW) No. 17	vs. (9 MW) Georgia Tech; First Round	W 71–60	25–4	Hinkle Fieldhouse (1,072); Indianapolis, IN
March 21, 2021; 11:10 am, CBS	(8 MW) No. 17	vs. (1 MW) No. 2 Illinois; Second Round	W 71–58	26–4	Bankers Life Fieldhouse (3,670); Indianapolis, IN
March 27, 2021; 1:40 pm, CBS	(8 MW) No. 17	vs. (12 MW) Oregon State; Sweet Sixteen	L 58–65	26–5	Bankers Life Fieldhouse (3,639); Indianapolis, IN
*Non-conference game. ^{#}Rankings from AP Poll. (#) Tournament seedings in parentheses. All times are in Central Time.

== Rankings ==
Ranking movements Legend: ██ Increase in ranking ██ Decrease in ranking — = Not ranked RV = Received votes
	Week																		
Poll	Pre	1	2	3	4	5	6	7	8	9	10	11	12	13	14	15	16	17	Final
AP	—	—	—	—	—	—	—	—	—	—	—	RV	22	22	21	20	18	17	Not released
Coaches	—	—^	—	—	—	—	—	—	—	—	RV	RV	23	23	22	22	18	16	12

*AP does not release post-NCAA Tournament rankings
^Coaches did not release a Week 1 poll.
