= 2020–21 Southern Illinois Salukis men's basketball team =

American college basketball season

2020–21 Southern Illinois Salukis men's basketball
- Conference: Missouri Valley Conference
- Record: 12–14 (5–13 MVC)
- Head coach: Bryan Mullins (2nd season)
- Assistant coaches: Brendan Mullins; Pat Monaghan; Jevon Mamon
- Home arena: Banterra Center

2020–21 Missouri Valley Conference men's basketball standings
	Conf.				Overall
Team	W		L	PCT	W		L	PCT
No. 17 Loyola Chicago †	16	–	2	.889	26	–	5	.839
Drake	15	–	3	.833	26	–	5	.839
Missouri State	12	–	6	.667	17	–	7	.708
Indiana State	11	–	7	.611	15	–	10	.600
Evansville	7	–	11	.389	9	–	16	.360
Valparaiso	7	–	11	.389	10	–	18	.357
Northern Iowa	7	–	11	.389	10	–	15	.400
Bradley	6	–	12	.333	12	–	16	.429
Southern Illinois	5	–	13	.278	12	–	14	.462
Illinois State	4	–	14	.222	7	–	18	.280
† 2021 MVC tournament winner Rankings from AP poll

The 2020–21 Southern Illinois Salukis men's basketball team represented Southern Illinois University Carbondale during the 2020–21 NCAA Division I men's basketball season. The Salukis were led by second-year head coach Bryan Mullins and played their home games at the Banterra Center (formerly SIU Arena) in Carbondale, Illinois as members of the Missouri Valley Conference. In as season limited due to the ongoing COVID-19 pandemic, the Salukis finished the season 12–14, 5–13 in MVC play to finish in ninth place. They defeated Bradley in the first round of the MVC tournament before losing to Loyola in the quarterfinals.

== Previous season ==
The Salukis finished the 2019–20 season 16–16, 10–8 in MVC play, finishing in fifth place. In the MVC tournament, the Salukis were eliminated by No. 4-seeded Bradley in the quarterfinals.

== Roster ==
2020–21 Southern Illinois Salukis men's basketball team
Players
Coaches

Pos.	#	Name	Height	Weight	Year	Previous school	Hometown
G	0	Eric Butler	6 ft 3 in (1.91 m)	170 lb (77 kg)	Fr	Orlando Christian Prep	Orlando, FL
F	1	Marcus Domask (injured)	6 ft 6 in (1.98 m)	215 lb (98 kg)	So	Waupun High School	Waupun, WI
G	3	Dalton Banks	6 ft 2 in (1.88 m)	170 lb (77 kg)	Fr	North High School	Eau Clair, WI
G	5	Lance Jones	6 ft 1 in (1.85 m)	200 lb (91 kg)	So	Evanston Township	Evanston, IL
G	10	Ben Harvey	6 ft 5 in (1.96 m)	205 lb (93 kg)	RS So	Eastern Illinois	Jonesboro, AR
F	11	J.D. Muila	6 ft 8 in (2.03 m)	235 lb (107 kg)	Jr	Indian Hills Community College	Ottawa, ON
F	12	Sekou Dembele	6 ft 7 in (2.01 m)	230 lb (104 kg)	RS So	Central Park Christian School	Bamako, Mali
C	14	Kyler Filewich	6 ft 9 in (2.06 m)	250 lb (113 kg)	Fr	Orangeview Prep	Winnipeg, MB
F	21	Will Keller	6 ft 7 in (2.01 m)	220 lb (100 kg)	Sr	John A. Logan	Marion, IL
G	22	Steven Verplancken Jr.	6 ft 4 in (1.93 m)	205 lb (93 kg)	So	Glenville State	San Pedro, DR
G	24	Trent Brown	6 ft 2 in (1.88 m)	175 lb (79 kg)	So	Pinnacle High School	Scottsdale, AZ
G	25	Jakolby Long	6 ft 5 in (1.96 m)	210 lb (95 kg)	RS Sr	Southern Utah	Oklahoma City, OK
G	32	Chris Cross	6 ft 2 in (1.88 m)	195 lb (88 kg)	Fr	Urbana High School	Urbana, IL
F	33	Anthony D’Avanzo	6 ft 8 in (2.03 m)	205 lb (93 kg)	RS Sr	Lewis University; Notre Dame College Prep	Harwood Heights, IL

Head coach

- Bryan Mullins (Southern Illinois)

Assistant coach(es)

- Brendan Mullins (Saint Michael's)
- Pat Monaghan (Lewis)
- Jevon Marmon (Barat College)

Legend

- (C) Team captain
- (S) Suspended
- (I) Ineligible
- (W) Walk-on
- Injured
- Current redshirt

Roster

== Schedule and results ==
Date time, TV	Rank^{#}	Opponent^{#}	Result	Record	Site city, state
Non-conference regular season
Dec 2, 2020*; 6:30 pm, ESPN+		Southeast Missouri State	W 87–79 ^{OT}	1–0	Show Me Center; Cape Girardeau, MO
Dec 6, 2020*; 4:00 pm, ESPN3		Quincy University	W 102–61	2–0	Banterra Center; Carbondale, IL
December 11, 2020*; 6:30 pm, ESPN3		Murray State; Charles Helleny Tip-off Classic	W 70–66	3–0	Banterra Center; Carbondale, IL
Dec 17, 2020*; 1:00 pm, ESPN3		North Dakota	W 85–64	4–0	Banterra Center; Carbondale, IL
Dec 18, 2020*; 3:00 pm, ESPN3		North Dakota	W 62–50	5–0	Banterra Center; Carbondale, IL
Dec 21, 2020*; 6:30 pm, FS1		Butler	W 76–73	6–0	Hinkle Fieldhouse; Indianapolis, IN
Missouri Valley regular season
Dec 27, 2020; 3:00 pm, ESPN+		Evansville	W 63–57	7–0 (1–0)	Banterra Center; Carbondale, IL
Dec 28, 2020; 5:00 pm, ESPN+		Evansville	L 72–84	7–1 (1–1)	Banterra Center; Carbondale, IL
Jan 3, 2021; 5:00 pm, ESPNU		at Drake	L 55–73	7–2 (1–2)	Knapp Center; Des Moines, IA
Jan 4, 2021; 6:00 pm, CBSSN		at Drake	L 55–86	7–3 (1–3)	Knapp Center; Des Moines, IA
Jan 25, 2021; 6:00 pm, ESPN+		at Indiana State	L 66–69	7–4 (1–4)	Hulman Center; Terre Haute, IN
Jan 26, 2021; 4:00 pm, ESPN+		at Indiana State	L 59–71	7–5 (1–5)	Hulman Center; Terre Haute, IN
Jan 30, 2021; 3:00 pm, FSMW		Northern Iowa	L 62–74	7–6 (1–6)	Banterra Center; Carbondale, IL
Jan 31, 2021; 5:00 pm, ESPN2		Northern Iowa	W 71–68	8–6 (2–6)	Banterra Center; Carbondale, IL
Feb 6, 2021; 3:00 pm, FSMW		at Bradley	L 66–74	8–7 (2–7)	Carver Arena; Peoria, IL
Feb 7, 2021; 3:00 pm, ESPN3		at Bradley	W 69–68	9–7 (3–7)	Carver Arena; Peoria, IL
Feb 10, 2021; 7:00 pm, FSMW		at Missouri State	L 53–65	9–8 (3–8)	JQH Arena; Springfield, MO
Feb 13, 2021; 3:00 pm, ESPN3		Illinois State	L 55–80	9–9 (3–9)	Banterra Center; Carbondale, IL
Feb 14, 2021; 3:00 pm, ESPN3		Illinois State	W 59–49	10–9 (4–9)	Banterra Center; Carbondale, IL
Feb 17, 2021; 8:15 pm, Marquee/ESPN3		Missouri State	L 53–68	10–10 (4–10)	Banterra Center; Carbondale, IL
Feb 21, 2021; 4:00 pm, Marquee/ESPN3		Valparaiso	L 65–66	10–11 (4–11)	Banterra Center; Carbondale, IL
Feb 22, 2021; 6:00 pm, ESPN+		Valparaiso	W 67–64	11–11 (5–11)	Banterra Center; Carbondale, IL
Feb 26, 2021; 8:00 pm, CBSSN		at No. 21 Loyola	L 52–60	11–12 (5–12)	Joseph J. Gentile Arena; Chicago, IL
Feb 27, 2021; 5:00 pm, ESPN2		at No. 21 Loyola	L 58–65 ^{OT}	11–13 (5–13)	Joseph J. Gentile Arena; Chicago, IL
MVC tournament
Mar 4, 2021; 5:00 pm, FSMW	(9)	vs. (8) Bradley; First Round	W 73–63	12–13	Enterprise Center (771); St. Louis, MO
Mar 5, 2021; 11:00 am, FSMW	(9)	vs. (1) No. 20 Loyola; Quarterfinals	L 49–73	12–14	Enterprise Center; St. Louis, MO
*Non-conference game. ^{#}Rankings from AP Poll. (#) Tournament seedings in parentheses. All times are in Central Time.
