= 2020–21 Missouri State Bears basketball team =

American college basketball season

2020–21 Missouri State Bears basketball
- Conference: Missouri Valley Conference
- Record: 17–7 (12–6 MVC)
- Head coach: Dana Ford (3rd season)
- Associate head coach: Corey Gipson
- Assistant coaches: Jase Herl; Sheldon Everett
- Home arena: JQH Arena

2020–21 Missouri Valley Conference men's basketball standings
	Conf.				Overall
Team	W		L	PCT	W		L	PCT
No. 17 Loyola Chicago †	16	–	2	.889	26	–	5	.839
Drake	15	–	3	.833	26	–	5	.839
Missouri State	12	–	6	.667	17	–	7	.708
Indiana State	11	–	7	.611	15	–	10	.600
Evansville	7	–	11	.389	9	–	16	.360
Valparaiso	7	–	11	.389	10	–	18	.357
Northern Iowa	7	–	11	.389	10	–	15	.400
Bradley	6	–	12	.333	12	–	16	.429
Southern Illinois	5	–	13	.278	12	–	14	.462
Illinois State	4	–	14	.222	7	–	18	.280
† 2021 MVC tournament winner Rankings from AP poll

The 2020–21 Missouri State Bears basketball team represented Missouri State University during the 2020–21 NCAA Division I men's basketball season. The Bears, led by third-year head coach Dana Ford, played their home games at JQH Arena in Springfield, Missouri as members of the Missouri Valley Conference. In a season limited by the ongoing COVID-19 pandemic, they finished the season 17–7, 12–6 in MVC play to finish in third place. They defeated Valparaiso in the quarterfinals of the MVC tournament before losing to Drake in the semifinals.

== Previous season ==
The Bears finished the 2019–20 season 16–17, 9–9 in MVC play to finish in a tie for sixth place. They defeated Indiana State in the quarterfinals of the MVC tournament before losing in the semifinals to Valparaiso. All postseason play was thereafter canceled due to the ongoing COVID-19 pandemic.

== Roster ==
2020–21 Missouri State Bears men's basketball team
Players
Coaches

Pos.	#	Name	Height	Weight	Year	Previous school	Hometown
G	0	DeMarcus Sharp	6 ft 3 in (1.91 m)	170 lb (77 kg)	Jr	Charleston HS; Colby CC	Charleston, MO
G	1	Isiaih Mosley	6 ft 5 in (1.96 m)	201 lb (91 kg)	So	Rock Bridge HS	Columbia, MO
G	2	Elijah Bridgers	6 ft 1 in (1.85 m)	170 lb (77 kg)	Fr	Kickapoo HS	Springfield, MO
G	3	Spencer Brown	6 ft 2 in (1.88 m)	192 lb (87 kg)	RS Sr	Fayetteville HS; Lyon College	Fayetteville, AR
G	4	Ja'Monta Black	6 ft 4 in (1.93 m)	190 lb (86 kg)	So	Rock Bridge HS	Columbia, MO
G	5	Jake Branham (redshirt)	6 ft 1 in (1.85 m)	172 lb (78 kg)	RS So	Springfield Catholic HS; Central Methodist	Springfield, MO
G	11	Raphe Ayres	6 ft 5 in (1.96 m)	204 lb (93 kg)	Fr	Vermont Academy	Arlington, VT
F	13	Melvyn Ebonkoli	6 ft 7 in (2.01 m)	227 lb (103 kg)	Fr	Putnam Science Academy	Trappes, France
G/F	14	Keaton Hervey	6 ft 7 in (2.01 m)	200 lb (91 kg)	Jr	Cedar Park HS; New Mexico JC	Cedar Park, TX
F	20	Nic Tata	6 ft 10 in (2.08 m)	261 lb (118 kg)	Jr	Mt. Eliza Secondary; Blinn CC	Melbourne, Australia
C	25	Darian Scott	6 ft 11 in (2.11 m)	208 lb (94 kg)	RS Jr	Centennial HS	Las Vegas, NV
C	33	Dawson Carper	7 ft 0 in (2.13 m)	278 lb (126 kg)	Jr	Rampart HS; Hawaii	Colorado Springs, CO
F	34	Jared Ridder	6 ft 8 in (2.03 m)	230 lb (104 kg)	RS Jr	Kickapoo HS; Xavier	Springfield, MO
F	44	Gaige Prim	6 ft 8 in (2.03 m)	235 lb (107 kg)	Sr	Grandview HS; South Plains CC	Aurora, CO
G	52	Lu'Cye Patterson	6 ft 1 in (1.85 m)	220 lb (100 kg)	Fr	Minnesota Prep Academy	Minneapolis, MN
G	55	Skylar Wicks	6 ft 5 in (1.96 m)	200 lb (91 kg)	Fr	Surge Christian Academy	Jersey City, NJ

Head coach

- Dana Ford (Illinois State)

Assistant coach(es)

- Corey Gipson (Austin Peay)
- Jase Herl (Colorado Mesa)
- Sheldon Everett (South Carolina)

Legend

- (C) Team captain
- (S) Suspended
- (I) Ineligible
- (W) Walk-on
- Injured
- Current redshirt

Roster
Last update: December 29, 2020

== Schedule and results ==
Date time, TV	Rank^{#}	Opponent^{#}	Result	Record	Site city, state
Regular season
December 16, 2020*; 7:00 pm, ESPN3		William Jewell	W 73–64	1–0	JQH Arena (1,279); Springfield, MO
December 19, 2020*; 7:00 pm, ESPN3		Northwestern State	W 94–67	2–0	JQH Arena (1,064); Springfield, MO
December 21, 2020*; 7:00 pm, ESPN3		Little Rock	W 85–77	3–0	JQH Arena (1,201); Springfield, MO
December 27, 2020; 3:00 pm, ESPN+		at Northern Iowa	W 79–59	4–0 (1–0)	McLeod Center (668); Cedar Falls, IA
December 28, 2020; 7:00 pm, ESPN+		at Northern Iowa	L 75–85	4–1 (1–1)	McLeod Center; Cedar Falls, IA
January 2, 2021; 5:00 pm, ESPN+		Indiana State	W 84–74	5–1 (2–1)	JQH Arena (1,139); Springfield, MO
January 3, 2021; 3:00 pm, ESPN3		Indiana State	W 70–66	6–1 (3–1)	JQH Arena (1,139); Springfield, MO
January 9, 2021; 1:00 pm, ESPN+		at Valparaiso	W 81–68	7–1 (4–1)	Athletics–Recreation Center; Valparaiso, IN
January 10, 2021; 1:00 pm, ESPN+		at Valparaiso	W 78–68	8–1 (5–1)	Athletics–Recreation Center (80); Valparaiso, IN
January 17, 2021*; 5:00 pm		Missouri S&T	W 94–49	9–1	JQH Arena (592); Springfield, MO
January 26, 2021; 7:00 pm, ESPN+		Drake	L 61–68	9–2 (5–2)	JQH Arena (1,989); Springfield, MO
January 27, 2021; 8:00 pm, ESPN+		Drake	L 73–78	9–3 (5–3)	JQH Arena (1,744); Springfield, MO
January 31, 2021; 2:00 pm, CBSSN		Loyola	L 46–72	9–4 (5–4)	JQH Arena (1,505); Springfield, MO
February 1, 2021; 7:00 pm, ESPN+		Loyola	L 50–70	9–5 (5–5)	JQH Arena (1,122); Springfield, MO
February 6, 2021; 2:00 pm, ESPN3		at Illinois State	W 74–67	10–5 (6–5)	Redbird Arena; Normal, IL
February 7, 2021; 2:00 pm, ESPN3		at Illinois State	W 72–62	11–5 (7–5)	Redbird Arena; Normal, IL
February 10, 2021; 7:00 pm, ESPN3		Southern Illinois	W 65–53	12–5 (8–5)	JQH Arena (917); Springfield, MO
February 13, 2021; 5:00 pm, ESPN+		Bradley	W 80–58	13–5 (9–5)	JQH Arena (1,372); Springfield, MO
February 14, 2021; 3:00 pm, ESPN+		Bradley	W 72–57	14–5 (10–5)	JQH Arena (801); Springfield, MO
February 17, 2020; 8:15 pm, ESPN3		at Southern Illinois	W 68–53	15–5 (11–5)	Banterra Center; Carbondale, IL
February 26, 2021; 6:00 pm, ESPN+		at Evansville	W 90–81	16–5 (12–5)	Ford Center; Evansville, IN
February 27, 2021; 6:00 pm, ESPN+		at Evansville	L 63–72	16–6 (12–6)	Ford Center; Evansville, IN
MVC tournament
March 5, 2021; 8:00 pm, ESPN+	(3)	vs. (6) Valparaiso; Quarterfinals	W 66–55	17–6	Enterprise Center; St. Louis, MO
March 6, 2021; 3:00 pm, CBSSN	(3)	vs. (2) Drake; Semifinals	L 69–71	17–7	Enterprise Center; St. Louis, MO
*Non-conference game. ^{#}Rankings from AP Poll. (#) Tournament seedings in parentheses. All times are in Central Time.
