= 2020–21 Missouri Valley Conference men's basketball season =

- League: NCAA Division I
- Sport: Basketball
- Teams: 10
- TV partner(s): CBS, CBSSN, FOX, FS1, FSN

Regular Season
- Season champions: Loyola–Chicago

Tournament
- Champions: Loyola–Chicago

Basketball seasons
- ← 2019–20 2021–22 →

2020–21 Missouri Valley Conference men's basketball standings
	Conf.				Overall
Team	W		L	PCT	W		L	PCT
No. 17 Loyola Chicago †	16	–	2	.889	26	–	5	.839
Drake	15	–	3	.833	26	–	5	.839
Missouri State	12	–	6	.667	17	–	7	.708
Indiana State	11	–	7	.611	15	–	10	.600
Evansville	7	–	11	.389	9	–	16	.360
Valparaiso	7	–	11	.389	10	–	18	.357
Northern Iowa	7	–	11	.389	10	–	15	.400
Bradley	6	–	12	.333	12	–	16	.429
Southern Illinois	5	–	13	.278	12	–	14	.462
Illinois State	4	–	14	.222	7	–	18	.280
† 2021 MVC tournament winner Rankings from AP poll

The 2020–21 Missouri Valley Conference men's basketball season began with practices in October 2020, followed by the start of the 2020–21 NCAA Division I men's basketball season in November. Conference play began in January 2021.

== Preseason ==
=== Preseason poll ===
The preseason awards and coaches' poll was released by the league office on October 14, 2020.

Rank	Team
1.	Northern Iowa (30) 426
2.	Loyola–Chicago (13) 405
3.	Bradley (1) 341
4.	Indiana State 282
5.	Southern Illinois 235
6.	Missouri State 210
7.	Drake 207
8.	Valparaiso 148
9.	Illinois State 112
10.	Evansville 54
(first place votes)

=== Preseason All-Missouri Valley teams ===
Honor	Recipient
Preseason Player of the Year	A. J. Green, Northern Iowa
Preseason All-MVC First Team	Elijah Childs, Bradley
Preseason All-MVC First Team	A. J. Green, Northern Iowa
Preseason All-MVC First Team	Tyreke Key, Indiana State
Preseason All-MVC First Team	Cameron Krutwig, Loyola–Chicago
Preseason All-MVC First Team	Austin Phyfe, Northern Iowa
Preseason All-MVC Second Team	Donovan Clay, Valparaiso
Preseason All-MVC Second Team	Marcus Domask, Southern Illinois
Preseason All-MVC Second Team	Jake LaRavia, Indiana State
Preseason All-MVC Second Team	Roman Penn, Drake
Preseason All-MVC Second Team	Gaige Prim, Missouri State
Preseason All-MVC Third Team	Trae Berhow, Northern Iowa
Preseason All-MVC Third Team	Keith Fisher III, Illinois State
Preseason All-MVC Third Team	Tate Hall, Loyola–Chicago
Preseason All-MVC Third Team	Marquise Kennedy, Loyola–Chicago
Preseason All-MVC Third Team	Tremell Murphy, Drake

== Regular season ==
=== Conference matrix ===
This table summarizes the head-to-head results between teams in conference play.

	Bradley	Drake	Evansville	Illinois State	Indiana State	Loyola– Chicago	Missouri State	Northern Iowa	Southern Illinois	Valparaiso
vs BU	–	1–1	0–2	2–0	2–0	2–0	2–0	1–1	1–1	1–1
vs DU	1–1	–	0–2	0–2	0–2	1–1	0–2	0–2	0–2	1–1
vs UE	2–0	2–0	–	1–1	2–0	2–0	1–1	0–2	1–1	0–2
vs IlSU	0–2	2–0	1–1	–	2–0	2–0	2–0	2–0	1–1	2–0
vs InSU	0–2	2–0	0–2	0–2	–	1–1	2–0	1–1	0–2	1–1
vs LU	0–2	1–1	0–2	0–2	1–1	–	0–2	0–2	0–2	0–2
vs MSU	0–2	2–0	1–1	0–2	0–2	2–0	–	1–1	0–2	0–2
vs UNI	1–1	2–0	2–0	0–2	1–1	2–0	1–1	–	1–1	1–1
vs SIU	1–1	2–0	1–1	1–1	2–0	2–0	2–0	1–1	–	1–1
vs VU	1–1	1–1	2–0	0–2	1–1	2–0	2–0	1–1	1–1	–
Total	6–12	15–3	7–11	4–14	11–7	16–2	12–6	7–11	5–13	7–11

=== Player of the week ===
Throughout the season, the Missouri Valley Conference named a player of the week and a newcomer of the week each Monday.

Week	Player of the week	Newcomer of the week
1	Elijah Childs, Bradley	Josiah Strong, Illinois State
2	Marcus Domask, Southern Illinois	Ben Harvey, Southern Illinois
3	Cameron Krutwig, Loyola-Chicago	ShanQuan Hemphill, Drake
4	Marcus Domask, Southern Illinois; Gaige Prim, Missouri State	ShanQuan Hemphill, Drake
5	Isiaih Mosley, Missouri State	Samari Curtis, Evansville
6	Isiaih Mosley, Missouri State	Rienk Mast, Bradley
7	Tate Hall, Loyola-Chicago	Terry Nolan Jr., Bradley
8	Ben Krikke, Valparaiso	Kyler Filewich, Southern Illinois
9	Cameron Krutwig, Loyola-Chicago	Darnell Brodie, Drake
10	Isiaih Mosley, Missouri State	Sheldon Edwards, Valparaiso
11	Tyreke Key, Indiana State	Darnell Brodie, Drake
12	Gaige Prim, Missouri State; Joseph Yesufu, Drake	Emon Washington, Illinois State
13	Shamar Givance, Evansville	Bowen Born, Northern Iowa

== Postseason ==
=== Coaches ===
Honor	Recipient
Coach of the Year	Darian DeVries, Drake

=== All-Conference Teams ===
Honor	Recipient
Larry Bird Player of the Year	Cameron Krutwig, Loyola–Chicago
Defensive MVP	Lucas Williamson, Loyola–Chicago
Sixth-Man of the Year	Joseph Yesufu, Drake
Newcomer of the Year	ShanQuan Hemphill, Drake
Freshman of the Year	Bowen Born, Northern Iowa
First Team
First Team	Tyreke Key, Indiana State
First Team	Cameron Krutwig, Loyola–Chicago
First Team	Isiaih Mosley, Missouri State
First Team	Roman Penn, Drake
First Team	Gaige Prim, Missouri State
Second Team
Second Team	Elijah Childs, Bradley
Second Team	Shamar Givance, Evansville
Second Team	ShanQuan Hemphill, Drake
Second Team	Jake LaRavia, Indiana State
Second Team	Lucas Williamson, Loyola–Chicago
Third Team
Third Team	D J Horne, Illinois State
Third Team	Lance Jones, Southern Illinois
Third Team	Ben Krikke, Valparaiso
Third Team	Austin Phyfe, Northern Iowa
Third Team	Aher Uguak, Loyola–Chicago
