= 2020–21 Evansville Purple Aces men's basketball team =

American college basketball season

2020–21 Evansville Purple Aces men's basketball
- Conference: Missouri Valley Conference
- Record: 9–16 (7–11 MVC)
- Head coach: Todd Lickliter (1st season)
- Assistant coaches: Logan Baumann; Thomas Jackson; Brandon Crone
- Home arena: Ford Center

2020–21 Missouri Valley Conference men's basketball standings
	Conf.				Overall
Team	W		L	PCT	W		L	PCT
No. 17 Loyola Chicago †	16	–	2	.889	26	–	5	.839
Drake	15	–	3	.833	26	–	5	.839
Missouri State	12	–	6	.667	17	–	7	.708
Indiana State	11	–	7	.611	15	–	10	.600
Evansville	7	–	11	.389	9	–	16	.360
Valparaiso	7	–	11	.389	10	–	18	.357
Northern Iowa	7	–	11	.389	10	–	15	.400
Bradley	6	–	12	.333	12	–	16	.429
Southern Illinois	5	–	13	.278	12	–	14	.462
Illinois State	4	–	14	.222	7	–	18	.280
† 2021 MVC tournament winner Rankings from AP poll

The 2020–21 Evansville Purple Aces men's basketball team represented the University of Evansville in the 2020–21 NCAA Division I men's basketball season. The Purple Aces were led by head coach Todd Lickliter in his first full season at Evansville and played their home games at the Ford Center as members of the Missouri Valley Conference (MVC). In a season limited due to the ongoing COVID-19 pandemic, they finished the season 9–16, 7–11 in MVC play to finish in a three-way tie for fifth place. As the No. 5 seed in the MVC tournament, they lost to Indiana State in the quarterfinals.

== Previous season ==
The Purple Aces finished the 2019–20 season 9–23, 0–18 in MVC play to finish in last place. They lost in the first round of the MVC tournament to Valparaiso.

They were coached by Walter McCarty until he was placed on administrative leave on December 27 for alleged Title IX violations and ultimately fired on January 21. Assistant coach Bennie Seltzer acted as interim coach until Todd Lickliter was hired as the new head coach.

== Preseason ==
In the conference's preseason poll, Evansville was picked to finish last in the MVC.

== Roster ==
2020–21 Evansville Purple Aces men's basketball team
Players
Coaches

Pos.	#	Name	Height	Weight	Year	Previous school	Hometown
G	0	Gage Bobe	6 ft 0 in (1.83 m)	170 lb (77 kg)	So	South Knox	Vincennes, IN
G	1	Emmette Page	6 ft 2 in (1.88 m)	180 lb (82 kg)	Jr	Ossesso Senior High School	Brooklyn Park, MN
F	2	Jack Levitch	6 ft 7 in (2.01 m)	195 lb (88 kg)	Sr	Trinity High School	Louisville, ky
G	3	Jawaun Newton	6 ft 3 in (1.91 m)	170 lb (77 kg)	Jr	Burges	El Paso
G	4	Devan Straub (W)	6 ft 2 in (1.88 m)	190 lb (86 kg)	RS Sr	Mater Dei; IU Kokomo	Evansville, IN
G	5	Shamar Givance	5 ft 10 in (1.78 m)	155 lb (70 kg)	Jr	First Love Christian Academy	Toronto, ON
F	10	Evan Kuhlman	6 ft 8 in (2.03 m)	220 lb (100 kg)	Sr	Lakota East	Liberty Township, OH
G	11	Thomasi Gilgeous-Alexander	6 ft 5 in (1.96 m)	160 lb (73 kg)	So	The Potter's House Christian Academy	Hamilton, ON
F	23	Trey Hall	6 ft 9 in (2.06 m)	200 lb (91 kg)	Fr	Link Year Prep	Willimantic, CT
G	24	Alex Matthews	6 ft 5 in (1.96 m)	210 lb (95 kg)	Fr	John Hardin HS	Elizabethtown, ky
G	30	Noah Frederking	6 ft 4 in (1.93 m)	210 lb (95 kg)	Sr	Okawville	Okawville, IL
F	31	Iyen Enaruna	6 ft 9 in (2.06 m)	210 lb (95 kg)	Jr	Cloud County CC	Amsterdam, Netherlands
G	41	Samari Curtis	6 ft 4 in (1.93 m)	190 lb (86 kg)	So	Xenia HS; Nebraska	Xenia, OH
F	42	Peace Ilegomah	6 ft 9 in (2.06 m)	240 lb (109 kg)	Sr	Montverde Academy; Pittsburgh	Benin City, Nigeria

Head coach

- Todd Lickliter (Butler)

Assistant coach(es)

- Logan Baumann (Louisville)
- Thomas Jackson (Butler)
- Brandon Crone (Butler)

Legend

- (C) Team captain
- (S) Suspended
- (I) Ineligible
- (W) Walk-on
- Injured
- Current redshirt

Roster

== Schedule and results ==
Date time, TV	Rank^{#}	Opponent^{#}	Result	Record	Site city, state
Non-conference regular season
Nov 25, 2020*; 3:00 pm, ACCN		Louisville; Wade Houston Tipoff Classic	L 44–79	0–1	KFC Yum! Center; Louisville, KY
Nov 27, 2020*; 12:00 pm, ESPN3		Prairie View A&M; Wade Houston Tipoff Classic	L 61–64	0–2	KFC Yum! Center; Louisville, KY
Dec 2, 2020*; 7:00 pm, ESPN+		at UT Martin	L 87–93 ^{2OT}	0–3	Skyhawk Arena; Martin, TN
~~Dec 6, 2020~~*; ~~TBA~~		~~IUPUI~~	Canceled due to COVID-19		~~Ford Center~~; ~~Evansville, IN~~
Dec 9, 2020*; 6:00 pm		Eastern Illinois	W 68–65	1–3	Ford Center; Evansville, IN
~~Dec 12, 2020~~*; ~~2:00 pm~~		~~Saint Louis~~	Canceled due to COVID-19		~~Chaifetz Arena~~; ~~Saint Louis, MO~~
Dec 15, 2020*; 6:00 pm		Southeast Missouri State	W 63–61 ^{OT}	2–3	Ford Center; Evansville, IN
Dec 21, 2020*; 6:00 pm, ESPN+		Belmont	L 63–72	2–4	Ford Center; Evansville, IN
Missouri Valley Conference regular season
Dec 27, 2020; 3:00 pm, ESPN+		at Southern Illinois	L 57–63	2–5 (0–1)	SIU Arena; Carbondale, IL
Dec 28, 2020; 5:00 pm, ESPN+		at Southern Illinois	W 84–72	3–5 (1–1)	SIU Arena; Carbondale, IL
Jan 2, 2021; 3:00 pm, ESPN+		Northern Iowa	W 65–61	4–5 (2–1)	Ford Center; Evansville, IN
Jan 3, 2021; 3:00 pm, ESPN+		Northern Iowa	W 70–64	5–5 (3–1)	Ford Center; Evansville, IN
Jan 9, 2021; 1:00 pm, ESPN3		Illinois State	W 57–48	6–5 (4–1)	Ford Center; Evansville, IN
Jan 10, 2021; 1:00 pm, ESPN3		Illinois State	L 68–73	6–6 (4–2)	Ford Center; Evansville, IN
Jan 16, 2021; 3:00 pm, ESPN3		at Bradley	L 60–69	6–7 (4–3)	Carver Arena; Peoria, IL
Jan 17, 2021; 3:00 pm, ESPN3		at Bradley	L 55–86	6–8 (4–4)	Peoria Civic Center; Peoria, IL
Jan 31, 2021; 3:00 pm, ESPN3		Valparaiso	W 70–52	7–8 (5–4)	Ford Center; Evansville, IN
Feb 1, 2021; 6:00 pm, ESPN3		Valparaiso	W 58–51	8–8 (6–4)	Ford Center; Evansville, IN
Feb 6, 2021; 1:00 pm, ESPN+		at Loyola	L 55–68	8–9 (6–5)	Joseph J. Gentile Arena; Chicago, IL
Feb 7, 2021; 1:00 pm, ESPN+		at Loyola	L 58–69	8–10 (6–6)	Joseph J. Gentile Arena; Chicago, IL
Feb 14, 2021; 3:00 pm, ESPN3		Indiana State	L 70–76	8–11 (6–7)	Ford Center; Evansville, IN
Feb 17, 2021; 4:00 pm, ESPN3		at Indiana State	L 73–98	8–12 (6–8)	Hulman Center; Terre Haute, IN
Feb 21, 2021; 3:00 pm, ESPN+		at Drake	L 71–85	8–13 (6–9)	Knapp Center; Des Moines, IA
Feb 22, 2021; 6:00 pm, ESPN+		at Drake	L 63–74	8–14 (6–10)	Knapp Center; Des Moines, IA
Feb 26, 2021; 6:00 pm, ESPN+		Missouri State	L 81–90	8–15 (6–11)	Ford Center; Evansville, IN
Feb 27, 2021; 6:00 pm, ESPN+		Missouri State	W 72–63	9–15 (7–11)	Ford Center; Evansville, IN
MVC tournament
March 5, 2021; 2:00 pm, ESPN+	(5)	vs. (4) Indiana State; Quarterfinals	L 43–53	9–16	Enterprise Center; St. Louis, MO
*Non-conference game. ^{#}Rankings from AP Poll. (#) Tournament seedings in parentheses. All times are in Central Time.
