= 2020–21 Valparaiso University men's basketball team =

American college basketball season

2020–21 Valparaiso University men's basketball
- Conference: Missouri Valley Conference
- Record: 10–18 (7–11 MVC)
- Head coach: Matt Lottich (5th season)
- Assistant coaches: Luke Gore; Rob Holloway; Matt Bowen
- Home arena: Athletics–Recreation Center

2020–21 Missouri Valley Conference men's basketball standings
	Conf.				Overall
Team	W		L	PCT	W		L	PCT
No. 17 Loyola Chicago †	16	–	2	.889	26	–	5	.839
Drake	15	–	3	.833	26	–	5	.839
Missouri State	12	–	6	.667	17	–	7	.708
Indiana State	11	–	7	.611	15	–	10	.600
Evansville	7	–	11	.389	9	–	16	.360
Valparaiso	7	–	11	.389	10	–	18	.357
Northern Iowa	7	–	11	.389	10	–	15	.400
Bradley	6	–	12	.333	12	–	16	.429
Southern Illinois	5	–	13	.278	12	–	14	.462
Illinois State	4	–	14	.222	7	–	18	.280
† 2021 MVC tournament winner Rankings from AP poll

The 2020–21 Valparaiso University men's basketball team represented Valparaiso University during the 2020–21 NCAA Division I men's basketball season. Valpo, led by fifth-year head coach Matt Lottich, played their home games at the Athletics–Recreation Center as members of the Missouri Valley Conference. They finished the season 10–18, 7–11 in MVC play to finish a three-way tie for fifth place. As the No. 6 seed in the MVC tournament, they lost to Missouri State in the quarterfinals.

In February 2021, the school officially retired the use of the Crusaders name and mascot due to its use by certain hate groups.

== Previous season ==
The Crusaders finished the 2019–20 season 19–16, 9–9 in MVC play to finish in a tie for sixth place. As the No. 7 seed in the MVC tournament, they defeated Evansville, Loyola–Chicago, and Missouri State to advance to the championship game where they lost to Bradley. All further postseason play was canceled shortly thereafter due to the ongoing COVID-19 pandemic.

== Offseason ==
=== Departures ===
Name	Number	Pos.	Height	Weight	Year	Hometown	Reason for departure
Javon Freeman-Liberty	0	G	6'3"	175	Sophomore	Chicago, IL	Transferred to DePaul
John Kiser	33	G/F	6'5"	205	Senior	Noblesville, IN	Graduated
Ryan Fazekas	35	G/F	6'7"	220	RS Senior	Chesterton, IN	Graduated

=== Incoming transfers ===
Name	Number	Pos.	Height	Weight	Year	Hometown	Previous School
Goodnews Kpegeol	0	G	6'5"	200	RS Sophomore	St. Paul, MN	Transferred from Southwest Mississippi CC.

=== 2020 recruiting class ===
College recruiting
Name	Hometown	School	Height	Weight	Commit date
Sheldon Edwards #13 SG	West Palm Beach, FL	Palm Beach Lakes / TLAP Sports Academy	6 ft 4 in (1.93 m)	180 lb (82 kg)	
Sheldon Edwards #13 SG	Recruit ratings: No ratings found				
Jacob Ognacevic #34 PF	Sheboygan, Wisconsin	Sheboygan Area Lutheran	6 ft 8 in (2.03 m)	210 lb (95 kg)	
Jacob Ognacevic #34 PF	Recruit ratings: No ratings found				
Connor Barrett #35 SG	Chicago, Illinois	Loyola Academy	6 ft 6 in (1.98 m)	200 lb (91 kg)	
Connor Barrett #35 SG	Recruit ratings: No ratings found				
Overall recruit ranking:
Note: In many cases, Scout, Rivals, 247Sports, On3, and ESPN may conflict in their listings of height and weight.; In these cases, the average was taken. ESPN grades are on a 100-point scale.; Sources:

== Roster ==
2020–21 Valparaiso Crusaders men's basketball team
Players
Coaches

Pos.	#	Name	Height	Weight	Year	Previous school	Hometown
G	0	Goodnews Kpegeol	6 ft 5 in (1.96 m)	200 lb (91 kg)	RS So	North HS; Kansas State/SW Mississippi CC	St. Paul, MN
G	1	Sigurd Lorange	5 ft 11 in (1.8 m)	185 lb (84 kg)	So	Metis Videregaende Skole	Trondheim, Norway
G	2	Zion Morgan	6 ft 5 in (1.96 m)	190 lb (86 kg)	RS Sr	Kenwood; UNLV/Wabash Valley	Chicago, IL
G	3	Steven Helm	6 ft 2 in (1.88 m)	180 lb (82 kg)	RS So	Valparaiso HS; Carroll	Valparaiso, IN
G	4	Daniel Sackey	5 ft 9 in (1.75 m)	175 lb (79 kg)	Jr	Thornlea	Winnipeg, MB
G/F	5	Donovan Clay	6 ft 7 in (2.01 m)	205 lb (93 kg)	So	Alton HS	Alton, IL
G	10	Eron Gordon	6 ft 3 in (1.91 m)	205 lb (93 kg)	RS Sr	Cathedral HS; Seton Hall	Indianapolis, IN
C	11	Emil Freese-Vilien	6 ft 10 in (2.08 m)	255 lb (116 kg)	So	Falkonergardens Gymnasium	Copenhagen, Denmark
G/F	12	Tyler Fricke (W)	6 ft 1 in (1.85 m)	170 lb (77 kg)	Fr	Buffalo Grove HS	Arlington Heights, IL
G	13	Sheldon Edwards	6 ft 4 in (1.93 m)	180 lb (82 kg)	Fr	Palm Beach Lakes HS; TLAP Sports Academy	West Palm Beach, FL
G	15	Luke Morrill (W)	6 ft 2 in (1.88 m)	200 lb (91 kg)	So	Montini Catholic HS	Lombard, IL
F	21	Brock Pappas (W)	6 ft 4 in (1.93 m)	205 lb (93 kg)	Jr	Washington Township HS	Valparaiso, IN
F	22	Mileek McMillan	6 ft 8 in (2.03 m)	230 lb (104 kg)	Sr	Merrillville HS	Merrillville, IN
F	23	Ben Krikke	6 ft 9 in (2.06 m)	230 lb (104 kg)	So	Jasper Place HS	Edmonton, AB
G	25	Nick Robinson	6 ft 5 in (1.96 m)	215 lb (98 kg)	RS Sr	Kenwood; Saint Joseph's	Chicago, IL
F	34	Jacob Ognacevic	6 ft 8 in (2.03 m)	210 lb (95 kg)	Fr	Sheboygan Lutheran HS	Sheboygan, WI
G/F	35	Connor Barrett	6 ft 6 in (1.98 m)	200 lb (91 kg)	Fr	Loyola Academy	Chicago, IL

Head coach

- Matt Lottich (Stanford)

Assistant coach(es)

- Luke Gore (Bethel (TN))
- Todd Townsend (Marquette)
- Rob Holloway (Eastern Illinois)

Legend

- (C) Team captain
- (S) Suspended
- (I) Ineligible
- (W) Walk-on
- Injured
- Current redshirt

Roster
Last update: January 1, 2021

== Schedule and results ==
Date time, TV	Rank^{#}	Opponent^{#}	Result	Record	Site (attendance) city, state
Regular season
November 27, 2020*; 6:00 pm, SECN		at Vanderbilt	L 71–77	0–1	Memorial Gymnasium (0); Nashville, TN
December 1, 2020*; 6:00 pm, ESPN3		at UIC	L 50–66	0–2	Credit Union 1 Arena (0); Chicago, IL
December 4, 2020*; 6:00 pm, BTN		at Purdue	L 61–68	0–3	Mackey Arena (0); West Lafayette, IN
December 6, 2020*; 1:00 pm, ESPN3		Judson	W 85–45	1–3	Athletics–Recreation Center (66); Valparaiso, IN
December 9, 2020*; 6:00 pm, ESPN3		SIU Edwardsville	W 80–58	2–3	Athletics–Recreation Center (60); Valparaiso, IN
December 12, 2020*; 3:30 pm, ESPN3		at Central Michigan	L 79–84	2–4	McGuirk Arena (0); Mount Pleasant, MI
December 16, 2020; 6:00 pm		Eastern Michigan; Canceled due to lack of available scholarship players for Eastern Michigan			Athletics–Recreation Center; Valparaiso, IN
December 17, 2020*; 5:30 pm, ESPN3		Purdue Northwest	W 89–71	3–4	Athletics–Recreation Center (74); Valparaiso, IN
December 19, 2020*; 1:00 pm, ESPN3		at Toledo	L 57–71	3–5	Savage Arena (0); Toledo, OH
December 21, 2020; 6:00 pm, ESPN3		Mount St. Joseph; Canceled due to COVID-19 protocols			Athletics–Recreation Center; Valparaiso, IN
January 9, 2021; 1:00 pm, ESPN+		Missouri State	L 68–81	3–6 (0–1)	Athletics–Recreation Center; Valparaiso, IN
January 10, 2021; 1:00 pm, ESPN+		Missouri State	L 68–78	3–7 (0–2)	Athletics–Recreation Center (80); Valparaiso, IN
January 16, 2021*; 3:00 pm, FS1		at DePaul	L 58–77	3–8	Wintrust Arena; Chicago, IL
January 20, 2021; 6:00 pm, ESPN+		Loyola–Chicago	L 39–75	3–9 (0–3)	Athletics–Recreation Center; Valparaiso, IN
January 23, 2021; 5:00 pm, ESPN3		at Illinois State	W 69–60	4–9 (1–3)	Redbird Arena; Normal, IL
January 24, 2021; 5:00 pm, ESPN3		at Illinois State	W 70–66	5–9 (2–3)	Redbird Arena; Normal, IL
January 28, 2021; 6:00 pm, ESPN3		Bradley	W 91–85 ^{2OT}	6–9 (3–3)	Athletics–Recreation Center (77); Valparaiso, IN
January 31, 2021; 3:00 pm, ESPN3		at Evansville	L 52–70	6–10 (3–4)	Ford Center; Evansville, IN
February 1, 2021; 6:00 pm, ESPN3		at Evansville	L 51–58	6–11 (3–5)	Ford Center; Evansville, IN
February 6, 2021; 1:00 pm, ESPN3		No. 25 Drake	L 77–80	6–12 (3–6)	Athletics–Recreation Center (123); Valparaiso, IN
February 7, 2021; 1:00 pm, ESPN+		No. 25 Drake	W 74–57	7–12 (4–6)	Athletics–Recreation Center (119); Valparaiso, IN
February 10, 2021; 6:00 pm, ESPN3		Bradley	L 52–76	7–13 (4–7)	Athletics–Recreation Center (88); Valparaiso, IN
February 13, 2021; 6:00 pm, ESPN+		at Northern Iowa	W 70–57	8–13 (5–7)	McLeod Center (713); Cedar Falls, IA
February 14, 2021; 6:00 pm, ESPN+		at Northern Iowa	L 60–74	8–14 (5–8)	McLeod Center (953); Cedar Falls, IA
February 17, 2021; 7:00 pm, ESPN+		at No. 22 Loyola–Chicago	L 52–54	8–15 (5–9)	Joseph J. Gentile Arena; Chicago, IL
February 20, 2021; 4:00 pm, ESPN+		at Southern Illinois	W 66–65	9–15 (6–9)	Banterra Center; Carbondale, IL
February 21, 2021; 6:00 pm, ESPN+		at Southern Illinois	L 64–67	9–16 (6–10)	Banterra Center; Carbondale, IL
February 26, 2021; 6:00 pm, ESPN3		Indiana State	L 43–58	9–17 (6–11)	Athletics–Recreation Center; Valparaiso, IN
February 27, 2021; 5:00 pm, ESPN+		Indiana State	W 70–58	10–17 (7–11)	Athletics–Recreation Center (128); Valparaiso, IN
MVC tournament
March 5, 2021; 8:00 pm, ESPN+	(6)	vs. (3) Missouri State; Quarterfinals	L 55–66	10–18	Enterprise Center; St. Louis, MO
*Non-conference game. ^{#}Rankings from AP Poll. (#) Tournament seedings in parentheses. All times are in Central Time.
