= Mark Freeman (basketball) =

American basketball player

No. 0 – James Madison Dukes
- Position: Point guard
- League: Sun Belt Conference

Personal information
- Born: October 6, 2000 (age 26)
- Listed height: 5 ft 11 in (1.80 m)
- Listed weight: 170 lb (77 kg)

Career information
- High school: Southwind (Memphis, Tennessee); The Skill Factory (Atlanta, Georgia)
- College: Tennessee State (2019–2021); Illinois State (2021–2022); Morehead State (2022–2024); James Madison (2024–present)

Career highlights
- OVC Player of the Year (2023); First-team All-OVC (2023); Second-team All-OVC (2021); Sun Belt Newcomer of the Year (2025); First-team All-Sun Belt (2025)

Mark Freeman (born October 6, 2000) is an American college basketball player for the James Madison Dukes of the Sun Belt Conference. He previously played for the Morehead State Eagles and Tennessee State Tigers of the Ohio Valley Conference and the Illinois State Redbirds of the Missouri Valley Conference.

== High school career ==
Freeman attended Southwind High School in Memphis, Tennessee. As a senior, he averaged 22 points and 8 assists per game and led Southwind to a 29–2 record and a spot in the regional semifinals. Freeman was a TSWA All-State honoree and a finalist for the Class AAA Mr. Basketball award. He initially committed to LIU Brooklyn, but opted to reclassify to the Class of 2019. Freeman played a season at The Skill Factory and signed with Tennessee State.

== College career ==
As a freshman, Freeman averaged 6.5 points and 4.2 assists per game. He averaged 17.1 points, 4.6 assists, and 4.1 rebounds per game as a sophomore, earning Second Team All-OVC honors. Freeman opted to transfer to Illinois State. On November 20, 2021, he scored a career-high 34 points in a 105–100 overtime win over Bucknell. Freeman averaged 8.8 points, 3.5 assists and 2.6 rebounds per game for the Redbirds. Following the season, Freeman transferred to Morehead State. As a senior, he averaged 15 points and 3.7 rebounds per game and led the Eagles to a regular-season OVC championship. He was named OVC Player of the Year as well as First Team All-OVC.

=== College ===
Year	Team	GP	GS	MPG	FG%	3P%	FT%	RPG	APG	SPG	BPG	PPG
2019–20	Tennessee State	30	16	28.4	.352	.294	.729	2.8	4.3	.8	.0	6.5
2020–21	Tennessee State	21	20	35.1	.397	.284	.817	4.1	4.6	2.0	.0	17.1
2021–22	Illinois State	31	14	25.0	.382	.386	.875	3.5	1.0	.0	-	8.8
2022–23	Morehead State	30	30	30.3	.405	.362	.864	2.8	3.7	1.2	.0	15.0
2023–24	Morehead State	Medical Redshirt										
Career		112	80	29.2	.388	.333	.833	3.0	4.0	1.2	.0	11.4
