= 2020–21 Indiana State Sycamores men's basketball team =

American college basketball season

2020–21 Indiana State Sycamores men's basketball
- Conference: Missouri Valley Conference
- Record: 15–10 (11–7 MVC)
- Head coach: Greg Lansing (11th season)
- Assistant coaches: Brett Carey; Kareem Richardson; Jake Odum
- Home arena: Hulman Center

2020–21 Missouri Valley Conference men's basketball standings
	Conf.				Overall
Team	W		L	PCT	W		L	PCT
No. 17 Loyola Chicago †	16	–	2	.889	26	–	5	.839
Drake	15	–	3	.833	26	–	5	.839
Missouri State	12	–	6	.667	17	–	7	.708
Indiana State	11	–	7	.611	15	–	10	.600
Evansville	7	–	11	.389	9	–	16	.360
Valparaiso	7	–	11	.389	10	–	18	.357
Northern Iowa	7	–	11	.389	10	–	15	.400
Bradley	6	–	12	.333	12	–	16	.429
Southern Illinois	5	–	13	.278	12	–	14	.462
Illinois State	4	–	14	.222	7	–	18	.280
† 2021 MVC tournament winner Rankings from AP poll

The 2020–21 Indiana State Sycamores men's basketball team represented Indiana State University in the 2020–21 NCAA Division I men's basketball season. The Sycamores, led by 11th-year head coach Greg Lansing, played their home games at the newly renovated Hulman Center in Terre Haute, Indiana as members of the Missouri Valley Conference. In a season limited by the ongoing COVID-19 pandemic, the Sycamores finished the season 15–10, 11–7 in MVC play to finish in fourth place. They defeated Evansville in the quarterfinals of the MVC tournament before losing to Loyola in the semifinals.

== Previous season ==
The Sycamores finished the 2019–20 season 18–12, 11–7 in MVC play to finish in a tie for third place. They lost in the quarterfinals of the MVC tournament to Missouri State.

== Roster ==
2020–21 Indiana State Sycamores men's basketball team
Players
Coaches

Pos.	#	Name	Height	Weight	Year	Previous school	Hometown
G	0	Cam Bacote	6 ft 3 in (1.91 m)	175 lb (79 kg)	Jr	Maryland Eastern Shore	Hampton, Virginia
C	1	Tre Williams	6 ft 7 in (2.01 m)	250 lb (113 kg)	So	Woodstock Academy	Reynoldsburg, Ohio
F	2	Kailex Stephens	6 ft 7 in (2.01 m)	214 lb (97 kg)	Jr	Tallahassee Community College	Tuscaloosa, Alabama
G/F	3	Jake LaRavia	6 ft 9 in (2.06 m)	228 lb (103 kg)	So	Lawrence Central High School	Indianapolis, Indiana
G	4	Cooper Neese	6 ft 4 in (1.93 m)	185 lb (84 kg)	Jr	Cloverdale High School	Cloverdale, Indiana
G	5	Jared Hankins	6 ft 4 in (1.93 m)	195 lb (88 kg)	RS Fr	Lawrence North High School	Indianapolis, Indiana
G	10	Julian Larry	6 ft 3 in (1.91 m)	185 lb (84 kg)	Fr	iSchool Entrepreneurial Academy	Frisco, Texas
G	11	Tyreke Key	6 ft 3 in (1.91 m)	205 lb (93 kg)	Sr	Clay County High School (TN)	Celina, Tennessee
G	13	Sam Mervis	5 ft 11 in (1.8 m)	172 lb (78 kg)	Fr	University High School	Indianapolis, Indiana
G	14	Tobias Howard Jr.	6 ft 2 in (1.88 m)	185 lb (84 kg)	GS	Towson	Lithonia, Georgia
G	20	Cobie Barnes	6 ft 6 in (1.98 m)	222 lb (101 kg)	So	Floyd Central High School	Floyds Knobs, Indiana
C	21	Ndongo Ndaw	6 ft 8 in (2.03 m)	220 lb (100 kg)	Jr	Butler Community College	New York, New York
G	44	Randy Miller Jr.	6 ft 2 in (1.88 m)	185 lb (84 kg)	GS	North Carolina Central	Odenton, Maryland
C	50	Nick Hittle	6 ft 10 in (2.08 m)	245 lb (111 kg)	Fr	Culver Academies	Indianapolis, Indiana

Head coach

- Greg Lansing (South Dakota)

Assistant coach(es)

- Brett Carey (UNC Asheville)
- Kareem Richardson (Evansville)
- Jake Odum (Indiana State)

Legend

- (C) Team captain
- (S) Suspended
- (I) Ineligible
- (W) Walk-on
- Injured
- Current redshirt

Roster
Last update: December 22, 2020

== Schedule and results ==
Date time, TV	Rank^{#}	Opponent^{#}	Result	Record	Site (attendance) city, state
Non-conference regular season
December 8, 2020*; 5:00 pm, ESPN3		Truman State	W 80–66	1–0	Hulman Center (60); Terre Haute, IN
December 12, 2020*; 7:30 pm, BTN		at Purdue	L 68–80	1–1	Mackey Arena (200); West Lafayette, IN
December 15, 2020*; 8:00 pm, FSMW/FSIN/FSKC		at Saint Louis	L 59–78	1–2	Chaifetz Arena; St. Louis, MO
December 19, 2020*; 1:00 pm, ESPN3		Ball State	W 67–57	2–2	Hulman Center (100); Terre Haute, IN
December 22, 2020*; 1:00 pm, ESPN3		Southeast Missouri State	W 72–66	3–2	Hulman Center (100); Terre Haute, IN
Missouri Valley regular season
December 27, 2020; 1:00 pm, ESPN+		Drake	L 63–81	3–3 (0–1)	Hulman Center (200); Terre Haute, IN
December 28, 2020; 5:00 pm, ESPN3		Drake	L 66–73	3–4 (0–2)	Hulman Center; Terre Haute, IN
January 2, 2021; 6:00 pm, ESPN+		at Missouri State	L 74–84	3–5 (0–3)	JQH Arena (1,139); Springfield, MO
January 3, 2021; 4:00 pm, ESPN3		at Missouri State	L 66–70	3–6 (0–4)	JQH Arena (1,139); Springfield, MO
January 10, 2021; 5:30 pm, ESPN2		Loyola	W 76–71	4–6 (1–4)	Hulman Center (80); Terre Haute, IN
January 11, 2021; 6:00 pm, CBSSN		Loyola	L 48–58	4–7 (1–5)	Hulman Center (90); Terre Haute, IN
January 16, 2021; 4:00 pm, Fox Sports		at Illinois State	W 73–65	5–7 (2–5)	Redbird Arena; Normal, IL
January 17, 2021; 3:00 pm, ESPN3		at Illinois State	W 74–68	6–7 (3–5)	Redbird Arena; Normal, IL
January 25, 2021; 6:00 pm, ESPN+		Southern Illinois	W 69–66	7–7 (4–5)	Hulman Center; Terre Haute, IN
January 26, 2021; 4:00 pm, ESPN+		Southern Illinois	W 71–59	8–7 (5–5)	Hulman Center; Terre Haute, IN
January 31, 2021; 3:00 pm, ESPN3		Bradley	W 60–57	9–7 (6–5)	Hulman Center (75); Terre Haute, IN
February 1, 2021; 4:00 pm, ESPN3		Bradley	W 67–55	10–7 (7–5)	Hulman Center (75); Terre Haute, IN
February 6, 2021; 5:00 pm, ESPNU		at Northern Iowa	W 61–57	11–7 (8–5)	McLeod Center; Cedar Falls, IA
February 7, 2021; 3:00 pm, Fox Sports		at Northern Iowa	L 67–70	11–8 (8–6)	McLeod Center (826); Cedar Falls, IA
February 14, 2021; 3:00 pm, ESPN3		at Evansville	W 76–70	12–8 (9–6)	Ford Center (1,503); Evansville, IN
February 17, 2021; 4:00 pm, ESPN3		Evansville	W 87–73	13–8 (10–6)	Hulman Center (65); Terre Haute, IN
February 26, 2021; 6:00 pm, ESPN3		at Valparaiso	W 58–43	14–8 (11–6)	Athletics–Recreation Center; Valparaiso, IN
February 27, 2021; 5:00 pm, ESPN+		at Valparaiso	L 58–70	14–9 (11–7)	Athletics–Recreation Center (128); Valparaiso, IN
MVC tournament
March 5, 2021; 2:00 pm, ESPN+	(4)	vs. (5) Evansville; Quarterfinals	W 53–43	15–9	Enterprise Center; St. Louis, MO
March 6, 2021; 1:00 pm, CBSSN	(4)	vs. (1) No. 20 Loyola; Semifinals	L 49–65	15–10	Enterprise Center; St. Louis, MO
*Non-conference game. ^{#}Rankings from AP Poll. (#) Tournament seedings in parentheses. All times are in Eastern.
