= 2020–21 Bradley Braves men's basketball team =

American college basketball season

2020–21 Bradley Braves men's basketball
- Conference: Missouri Valley Conference
- Record: 12–16 (6–12 MVC)
- Head coach: Brian Wardle (6th season)
- Assistant coaches: Drew Adams; Mike Bargen; Jimmie Foster
- Home arena: Carver Arena

2020–21 Missouri Valley Conference men's basketball standings
	Conf.				Overall
Team	W		L	PCT	W		L	PCT
No. 17 Loyola Chicago †	16	–	2	.889	26	–	5	.839
Drake	15	–	3	.833	26	–	5	.839
Missouri State	12	–	6	.667	17	–	7	.708
Indiana State	11	–	7	.611	15	–	10	.600
Evansville	7	–	11	.389	9	–	16	.360
Valparaiso	7	–	11	.389	10	–	18	.357
Northern Iowa	7	–	11	.389	10	–	15	.400
Bradley	6	–	12	.333	12	–	16	.429
Southern Illinois	5	–	13	.278	12	–	14	.462
Illinois State	4	–	14	.222	7	–	18	.280
† 2021 MVC tournament winner Rankings from AP poll

The 2020–21 Bradley Braves men's basketball team represented Bradley University during the 2020–21 NCAA Division I men's basketball season. The Braves, led by sixth-year head coach Brian Wardle, play their home games at Carver Arena in Peoria, Illinois as members of the Missouri Valley Conference. In a season limited by the ongoing COVID-19 pandemic, the Braves finished the season 12–16, 6–12 in MVC play to finish in eighth place. They lost to Southern Illinois in the first round of the MVC tournament.

== Previous season ==
The Braves finished the 2019–20 season 23–11, 11–7 in MVC play to finish in a tie for third place. They defeated Southern Illinois, Drake, and Valparaiso to win the MVC tournament for the second consecutive year. As a result, they received the conference's automatic bid to the NCAA tournament. However, the NCAA Tournament was thereafter canceled due to the ongoing COVID-19 pandemic.

== Offseason ==
=== 2020 recruiting class ===
College recruiting information
Name	Hometown	School	Height	Weight	Commit date
Jayson Kent #20 SG	Oak Forest, IL	Oak Forest High School	6 ft 7 in (2.01 m)	190 lb (86 kg)	Apr 1, 2020
Jayson Kent #20 SG	Recruit ratings: Scout: Rivals: 247Sports: (NR)				
Connor Linke #34 PF	St. Charles, IL	St. Charles North High School	6 ft 9 in (2.06 m)	225 lb (102 kg)	Oct 27, 2019
Connor Linke #34 PF	Recruit ratings: Scout: Rivals: 247Sports: (NR)				
Darius Hannah #35 PF	Milwaukee, WI	Milwaukee Academy of Science	6 ft 8 in (2.03 m)	190 lb (86 kg)	Sep 24, 2019
Darius Hannah #35 PF	Recruit ratings: Scout: Rivals: 247Sports: (NR)				
Overall recruit ranking: Scout: – Rivals: –
Note: In many cases, Scout, Rivals, 247Sports, On3, and ESPN may conflict in their listings of height and weight.; In these cases, the average was taken. ESPN grades are on a 100-point scale.; Sources: "Bradley Commit List for 2020". Rivals.; "2020 Team Ranking". Rivals.

== Roster ==
2020–21 Bradley Braves men's basketball team
Players
Coaches

Pos.	#	Name	Height	Weight	Year	Previous school	Hometown
G	0	Danya Kingsby (S)	6 ft 1 in (1.85 m)	175 lb (79 kg)	Sr	Hamilton HS; Southern Idaho	Milwaukee, WI
C	1	Ari Boya	7 ft 1 in (2.16 m)	245 lb (111 kg)	Jr	Scotland Prep	Douala, Cameroon
G	2	Antonio Thomas	6 ft 2 in (1.88 m)	185 lb (84 kg)	So	East HS	Memphis, TN
G	4	Terry Nolan, Jr. (S)	6 ft 4 in (1.93 m)	190 lb (86 kg)	RS Jr	Our Lady of Mount Carmel HS; George Washington	Baltimore, MD
G	5	Sean East II	6 ft 3 in (1.91 m)	175 lb (79 kg)	So	Combine Academy; UMass	Louisville, KY
F	10	Elijah Childs (S)	6 ft 8 in (2.03 m)	230 lb (104 kg)	Sr	Lee's Summit West HS	Kansas City, MO
G/F	14	Riley Burger	6 ft 5 in (1.96 m)	200 lb (91 kg)	So	Totino-Grace HS	Orono, MN
G/F	20	Jayson Kent	6 ft 7 in (2.01 m)	190 lb (86 kg)	Fr	Oak Forest HS	Oak Forest, IL
G	21	Kevin McAdoo	6 ft 2 in (1.88 m)	180 lb (82 kg)	RS Jr	West Bloomfield HS; Eastern Michigan	Pontiac, MI
F	22	Ja'Shon Henry	6 ft 6 in (1.98 m)	230 lb (104 kg)	Jr	Athol Murray College of Notre Dame	Saskatoon, Saskatchewan
G	23	Ville Tahvanainen	6 ft 4 in (1.93 m)	210 lb (95 kg)	So	Helsinki Basketball Academy	Helsinki, Finland
F	25	Thomas Hall (W)	6 ft 7 in (2.01 m)	220 lb (100 kg)	Fr	Metamora Township HS	Metamora, IL
F	34	Connor Linke	6 ft 9 in (2.06 m)	225 lb (102 kg)	Fr	St. Charles North HS	St. Charles, IL
F	35	Darius Hannah	6 ft 8 in (2.03 m)	190 lb (86 kg)	Fr	Milwaukee Academy of Science	Milwaukee, WI
F	51	Rienk Mast	6 ft 9 in (2.06 m)	240 lb (109 kg)	RS Fr	Donar Groningen	Groningen, Netherlands

Head coach

- Brian Wardle (Marquette)

Assistant coach(es)

- Drew Adams (Tennessee)
- Mike Bargen (Marquette)
- Jimmie Foster (South Dakota)

Legend

- (C) Team captain
- (S) Suspended
- (I) Ineligible
- (W) Walk-on
- Injured
- Current redshirt

Roster
Last update: December 31, 2020

== Schedule and results ==
Date time, TV	Rank^{#}	Opponent^{#}	Result	Record	Site (attendance) city, state
Non-conference regular season
November 25, 2020*; 2:00 pm		vs. Toledo; Xavier Invitational	W 61–59	0–1	Cintas Center (111); Cincinnati, OH
November 26, 2020*; 11:00 am		at Xavier; Xavier Invitational	L 50–51	1–1	Cintas Center (300); Cincinnati, OH
November 27, 2020*; 2:00 pm		vs. Oakland; Xavier Invitational	W 74–60	2–1	Cintas Center (58); Cincinnati, OH
December 1, 2020*; 7:00 pm, ESPN3		Judson	W 105–32	3–1	Carver Arena (0); Peoria, IL
December 4, 2020*; 7:00 pm, ESPN3		South Dakota State	L 84–88	3–2	Carver Arena (0); Peoria, IL
December 5, 2020*; 2:00 pm, ESPN3		Saint Joseph's	Canceled due to COVID-19 issues		Carver Arena; Peoria, IL
December 7, 2020*; 7:00 pm, ESPN3		Lewis	W 95–62	4–2	Carver Arena (0); Peoria, IL
December 17, 2020*; 7:00 pm, ESPN3		Jackson State	W 83–60	5–2	Carver Arena (0); Peoria, IL
December 19, 2020*; 7:00 pm, ESPN3		Miami (OH)	W 69–68	6–2	Carver Arena (0); Peoria, IL
December 22, 2020*; 6:00 pm, SECN		at No. 14 Missouri	L 53–54	6–3	Mizzou Arena (2,956); Columbia, MO
Missouri Valley Conference regular season
January 10, 2021; 3:00 pm, ESPN+		at Northern Iowa	L 72–78	6–4 (0–1)	McLeod Center (708); Cedar Falls, IA
January 11, 2021; 7:00 pm, ESPN+		at Northern Iowa	W 75–73	7–4 (1–1)	McLeod Center (608); Cedar Falls, IA
January 16, 2021; 3:00 pm, ESPN3		Evansville	W 69–60	8–4 (2–1)	Carver Arena; Peoria, IL
January 17, 2021; ESPN3		Evansville	W 86–55	9–4 (3–1)	Carver Arena; Peoria, IL
January 20, 2021; 8:00 pm, ESPN3		Illinois State	L 56–71	9–5 (3–2)	Carver Arena; Peoria, IL
January 24, 2021; 3:00 pm, ESPN+		Loyola	L 56–69	9–6 (3–3)	Carver Arena; Peoria, IL
January 25, 2021; 6:00 pm, CBSSN		Loyola	L 58–65	9–7 (3–4)	Carver Arena; Peoria, IL
January 28, 2021; 6:00 pm, ESPN3		at Valparaiso	L 85–91 ^{2OT}	9–8 (3–5)	Athletics–Recreation Center (77); Valparaiso, IN
January 31, 2021; 3:00 pm, ESPN3		at Indiana State	L 57–60	9–9 (3–6)	Hulman Center (75); Terre Haute, IN
February 1, 2021; 4:00 pm, ESPN3		at Indiana State	L 55–67	9–10 (3–7)	Hulman Center (75); Terre Haute, IN
February 6, 2021; 3:00 pm, ESPN3		Southern Illinois	W 74–66	10–10 (4–7)	Carver Arena; Peoria, IL
February 7, 2021; 3:00 pm, ESPN3		Southern Illinois	L 68–69	10–11 (4–8)	Carver Arena; Peoria, IL
February 10, 2020; 6:00 pm, ESPN3		at Valparaiso	W 76–52	11–11 (5–8)	Athletics–Recreation Center (88); Valparaiso, IN
February 13, 2021; 5:00 pm, ESPN+		at Missouri State	L 58–80	11–12 (5–9)	JQH Arena (1,372); Springfield, MO
February 14, 2021; 3:00 pm, ESPN+		at Missouri State	L 57–72	11–13 (5–10)	JQH Arena (801); Springfield, MO
February 18, 2021; 6:00 pm, ESPN+		Illinois State	L 71–88	11–14 (5–11)	Carver Arena; Peoria, IL
February 26, 2021; 6:00 pm, ESPN+		Drake	L 71–80	11–15 (5–12)	Carver Arena; Peoria, IL
February 27, 2021; 6:00 pm, ESPN+		Drake	W 67–61	12–15 (6–12)	Carver Arena; Peoria, IL
MVC tournament
March 4, 2021; 5:00 pm, ESPN+	(8)	vs. (9) Southern Illinois; First round	L 63–73	12–16	Enterprise Center; St. Louis, MO
*Non-conference game. ^{#}Rankings from AP Poll. (#) Tournament seedings in parentheses. All times are in Central Time.
