= 2020–21 Drake Bulldogs men's basketball team =

American college basketball season

2020–21 Drake Bulldogs men's basketball

NCAA tournament, First Round
- Conference: Missouri Valley Conference
- Record: 26–5 (15–3 MVC)
- Head coach: Darian DeVries (3rd season)
- Assistant coaches: Larry Blunt; Marty Richter; Matt Gatens
- Home arena: Knapp Center

2020–21 Missouri Valley Conference men's basketball standings
| | Conf. | | | | Overall |
| Team | W | | L | PCT | W | | L | PCT |
|---|---|---|---|---|---|---|---|---|
| No. 17 Loyola Chicago † | 16 | – | 2 | .889 | 26 | – | 5 | .839 |
| Drake | 15 | – | 3 | .833 | 26 | – | 5 | .839 |
| Missouri State | 12 | – | 6 | .667 | 17 | – | 7 | .708 |
| Indiana State | 11 | – | 7 | .611 | 15 | – | 10 | .600 |
| Evansville | 7 | – | 11 | .389 | 9 | – | 16 | .360 |
| Valparaiso | 7 | – | 11 | .389 | 10 | – | 18 | .357 |
| Northern Iowa | 7 | – | 11 | .389 | 10 | – | 15 | .400 |
| Bradley | 6 | – | 12 | .333 | 12 | – | 16 | .429 |
| Southern Illinois | 5 | – | 13 | .278 | 12 | – | 14 | .462 |
| Illinois State | 4 | – | 14 | .222 | 7 | – | 18 | .280 |
† 2021 MVC tournament winner Rankings from AP poll

The 2020–21 Drake Bulldogs men's basketball team represented Drake University during the 2020–21 NCAA Division I men's basketball season. The Bulldogs are led by third-year head coach Darian DeVries. They played their home games at Knapp Center on campus in Des Moines, Iowa, as members of the Missouri Valley Conference (MVC). In a season limited due to the ongoing COVID-19 pandemic, the Bulldogs finished the season 26–5, 15–3 in MVC play to finish in second place. In the quarterfinals of the MVC tournament, they advanced to the semifinals after Northern Iowa was forced to forfeit due to COVID-19 issues. They defeated Missouri State in the semifinals before losing to Loyola in the championship game. They received an at-large bid to the NCAA tournament as a No. 11 seed in the First Four. They defeated Wichita State to advance to the First Round where they were eliminated by USC.

== Previous season ==
The Bulldogs finished the season 20–14, 8–10 in MVC play to finish in eighth place. They defeated Illinois State and Northern Iowa to advance to the semifinals of the MVC tournament where they lost to Bradley. All postseason tournaments were thereafter canceled due to the ongoing COVID-19 pandemic.

== Offseason ==
=== Departures ===
| Name | Number | Pos. | Height | Weight | Year | Hometown | Reason for departure |
|---|---|---|---|---|---|---|---|
| Brady Ernst | 31 | F | 6'10" | 230 | RS Senior | Clinton, IA | Graduated. |
| Samm Jones | 1 | G | 5'11" | 196 | Junior | Minneapolis, MN | Transferred to Davenport University. |
| Liam Robbins | 21 | C | 7'0" | 235 | Sophomore | Davenport, IA | Transferred to Minnesota. |

=== Incoming transfers ===
| Name | Number | Pos. | Height | Weight | Year | Hometown | Previous School |
|---|---|---|---|---|---|---|---|
| ShanQuan Hemphill | 4 | F | 6'6" | 195 | Senior | Gary, IN | Transferred from Green Bay. Missed almost all of 2019–20 season with lower body injury; petitioned for and was granted a medical waiver that gave him a sixth season of eligibility. |
| Darnell Brodie | 51 | F | 6'10" | 275 | Junior | Newark, NJ | Transferred from Seton Hall. Played just 3 games during 2019–20 season due to injuries and illnesses. Granted hardship waiver that gave him immediate eligibility for 2020–21 season. |

=== 2020 recruiting class ===
College recruiting information
| Name | Hometown | School | Height | Weight | Commit date |
|---|---|---|---|---|---|
| Bryceson Burns #11 G/F | Houston, TX | Westfield High School | 6 ft 5 in (1.96 m) | 190 lb (86 kg) | Apr 8, 2020 |
| Bryceson Burns #11 G/F | Recruit ratings: Scout: Rivals: (NR) | | | | |
| Jordan Kwiecinski #21 PF | Chicago, IL | Loyola Academy | 6 ft 9 in (2.06 m) | 195 lb (88 kg) | Jul 27, 2019 |
| Jordan Kwiecinski #21 PF | Recruit ratings: Scout: Rivals: (NR) | | | | |
Overall recruit ranking:
Note: In many cases, Scout, Rivals, 247Sports, On3, and ESPN may conflict in their listings of height and weight.; In these cases, the average was taken. ESPN grades are on a 100-point scale.; Sources: "2020 Team Ranking". Rivals.

== Roster ==
2020–21 Drake Bulldogs men's basketball team
Players
Coaches

| Pos. | # | Name | Height | Weight | Year | Previous school | Hometown |
|---|---|---|---|---|---|---|---|
| G | 0 | D. J. Wilkins | 6 ft 2 in (1.88 m) | 182 lb (83 kg) | RS Jr | Florida Southwestern State; Merrillville | Merrillville, IN |
| G | 1 | Joseph Yesufu | 6 ft 0 in (1.83 m) | 180 lb (82 kg) | So | Bolingbrook | Bolingbrook, IL |
| F | 2 | Tremell Murphy | 6 ft 6 in (1.98 m) | 210 lb (95 kg) | RS Sr | Florida Southwestern State; Griffith | Griffith, IN |
| G | 3 | Garrett Sturtz (W) | 6 ft 3 in (1.91 m) | 175 lb (79 kg) | Jr | Newton | Newton, IA |
| F | 4 | ShanQuan Hemphill | 6 ft 6 in (1.98 m) | 195 lb (88 kg) | Sr | Green Bay; Michigan City | Gary, IN |
| G | 10 | Okay Djamgouz | 6 ft 5 in (1.96 m) | 182 lb (83 kg) | RS Fr | London Basketball Academy | Toronto, Canada |
| G/F | 11 | Bryceson Burns | 6 ft 5 in (1.96 m) | 190 lb (86 kg) | Fr | Westfield | Houston, TX |
| G | 12 | Roman Penn (injured) | 6 ft 0 in (1.83 m) | 185 lb (84 kg) | RS Jr | Siena; Bishop Noll | Calumet City, IL |
| F | 13 | Issa Samake | 6 ft 8 in (2.03 m) | 220 lb (100 kg) | RS Fr | Grand View Christian | Des Moines, IA |
| G | 14 | Noah Thomas | 6 ft 2 in (1.88 m) | 163 lb (74 kg) | Sr | 22 Ft Academy | Sydney, Australia |
| G | 20 | Jonah Jackson | 6 ft 3 in (1.91 m) | 210 lb (95 kg) | Sr | John A. Logan College; Merrillville | Merrillville, IN |
| F | 21 | Jordan Kwiecinski | 6 ft 9 in (2.06 m) | 195 lb (88 kg) | Fr | Loyola Academy | Chicago, IL |
| G/F | 22 | Andrew Barrett (W) | 6 ft 5 in (1.96 m) | 183 lb (83 kg) | Jr | Alleman | Rock Island, IL |
| F | 24 | Nate Ferguson | 6 ft 8 in (2.03 m) | 210 lb (95 kg) | RS Fr | Lemont | Lemont, IL |
| G | 25 | Connor Gholson (W) | 6 ft 3 in (1.91 m) | 192 lb (87 kg) | RS Jr | Newton | Newton, IA |
| G | 41 | Deven Dahlke (W) | 6 ft 2 in (1.88 m) | 185 lb (84 kg) | Fr | St. Mary's | Phoenix, AZ |
| F | 51 | Darnell Brodie | 6 ft 10 in (2.08 m) | 275 lb (125 kg) | Jr | Seton Hall; Newark East Side | Newark, NJ |

Head coach

- Darian DeVries (Northern Iowa)

Assistant coach(es)

- Larry Blunt (James Madison)
- Marty Richter (Simpson)
- Matt Gatens (Iowa)

Legend

- (C) Team captain
- (S) Suspended
- (I) Ineligible
- (W) Walk-on
- Injured
- Current redshirt

Roster

== Schedule and results ==
| Date time, TV | Rank^{#} | Opponent^{#} | Result | Record | Site (attendance) city, state |
Non-conference regular season
| Nov 25, 2020*; 1:00 pm, ESPNU | | at Kansas State; Little Apple Classic | W 80–70 | 1–0 | Bramlage Coliseum; Manhattan, KS |
| Nov 27, 2020*; 1:00 pm | | vs. South Dakota; Little Apple Classic | W 69–53 | 2–0 | Bramlage Coliseum; Manhattan, KS |
| Dec 3, 2020*; 7:00 pm, ESPN3 | | Omaha | W 87–66 | 3–0 | Knapp Center (89); Des Moines, IA |
| Dec 6, 2020*; 2:00 pm, ESPN3 | | St. Ambrose | W 97–53 | 4–0 | Knapp Center; Des Moines, IA |
| Dec 9, 2020*; 7:00 pm, ESPN3 | | McKendree | W 90–66 | 5–0 | Knapp Center (83); Des Moines, IA |
| Dec 13, 2020*; 1:00 pm, ESPN+ | | Air Force | W 81–53 | 6–0 | Knapp Center (141); Des Moines, IA |
| Dec 18, 2020*; 5:00 pm | | at South Dakota | W 75–57 | 7–0 | Sanford Coyote Sports Center (382); Vermillion, SD |
| Dec 20, 2020*; 2:00 pm, ESPN+ | | Chicago State | W 111–67 | 8–0 | Knapp Center (331); Des Moines, IA |
| Dec 22, 2020*; 6:00 pm, ESPN+ | | North Dakota | W 88–55 | 9–0 | Knapp Center (325); Des Moines, IA |
MVC regular season
| Dec 27, 2020; 12:00 pm, ESPN+ | | at Indiana State | W 81–63 | 10–0 (1–0) | Hulman Center (200); Terre Haute, IN |
| Dec 28, 2020; 4:00 pm, ESPN3 | | at Indiana State | W 73–66 | 11–0 (2–0) | Hulman Center; Terre Haute, IN |
| Jan 3, 2021; 5:00 pm, ESPNU | | Southern Illinois | W 73–55 | 12–0 (3–0) | Knapp Center; Des Moines, IA |
| Jan 4, 2021; 6:00 pm, CBSSN | | Southern Illinois | W 86–55 | 13–0 (4–0) | Knapp Center; Des Moines, IA |
| Jan 26, 2021; 7:00 pm, MVC TV | | at Missouri State | W 68–61 | 14–0 (5–0) | JQH Arena (1,989); Springfield, MO |
| Jan 27, 2021; 8:00 pm, ESPN+ | | at Missouri State | W 78–73 | 15–0 (6–0) | JQH Arena (1,744); Springfield, MO |
| Jan 31, 2021; 2:00 pm, ESPN3 | | Illinois State | W 78–76 ^{OT} | 16–0 (7–0) | Knapp Center (947); Des Moines, IA |
| Feb 1, 2021; 6:00 pm, ESPN3 | No. 25 | Illinois State | W 95–60 | 17–0 (8–0) | Knapp Center (737); Des Moines, IA |
| Feb 6, 2021; 1:00 pm, ESPN3 | No. 25 | at Valparaiso | W 80–77 | 18–0 (9–0) | Athletics–Recreation Center; Valparaiso, IN |
| Feb 7, 2021; 1:00 pm, ESPN+ | No. 25 | at Valparaiso | L 57–74 | 18–1 (9–1) | Athletics–Recreation Center; Valparaiso, IN |
| Feb 10, 2021; 6:00 pm, CBSSN | | Northern Iowa | W 80–59 | 19–1 (10–1) | Knapp Center (971); Des Moines, IA |
| Feb 13, 2021; 11:00 am, ESPN2 | | No. 22 Loyola–Chicago | L 54–81 | 19–2 (10–2) | Knapp Center (864); Des Moines, IA |
| Feb 14, 2021; 2:00 pm, ESPN2 | | No. 22 Loyola–Chicago | W 51–50 ^{OT} | 20–2 (11–2) | Knapp Center (921); Des Moines, IA |
| Feb 17, 2021; 7:00 pm, ESPN+ | | at Northern Iowa | W 77–69 | 21–2 (12–2) | McLeod Center (914); Cedar Falls, IA |
| Feb 21, 2021; 3:00 pm, MVC TV | | Evansville | W 85–71 | 22–2 (13–2) | Knapp Center (753); Des Moines, IA |
| Feb 22, 2021; 6:00 pm, ESPN+ | | Evansville | W 74–63 | 23–2 (14–2) | Knapp Center (675); Des Moines, IA |
| Feb 26, 2021; 6:00 pm, MVC TV | | at Bradley | W 80–71 | 24–2 (15–2) | Carver Arena; Peoria, IL |
| Feb 27, 2021; 6:00 pm, ESPN+ | | at Bradley | L 61–67 | 24–3 (15–3) | Carver Arena; Peoria, IL |
MVC tournament
| March 5, 2021; 5:00 pm, ESPN+ | (2) | vs. (7) Northern Iowa; Quarterfinals | Won by forfeit due to COVID-19 issues at UNI (Note: Prior to the game, the MVC announced that due to a positive COVID-19 test within the Northern Iowa program and subsequent contact tracing, the Panthers would not have enough available players to compete. Therefore, in accordance with policies that had been in place all season, the contest was canceled and the MVC ruled that Drake would advance to the semifinals.) | | Enterprise Center; St. Louis, MO |
| March 6, 2021; 3:00 pm, CBSSN | (2) | vs. (3) Missouri State; Semifinals | W 71–69 | 25–3 | Enterprise Center (1,178); St. Louis, MO |
| March 7, 2021; 1:00 pm, CBS | (2) | vs. (1) No. 20 Loyola–Chicago; Championship | L 65–75 | 25–4 | Enterprise Center (1,265); St. Louis, MO |
NCAA tournament
| March 18, 2021; 5:27 pm, TBS | (11 W) | vs. (11 W) Wichita State; First Four | W 53–52 | 26–4 | Mackey Arena (2,825); West Lafayette, IN |
| March 20, 2021; 3:30 pm, TNT | (11 W) | vs. (6 W) No. 23 USC; First Round | L 56–72 | 26–5 | Bankers Life Fieldhouse; Indianapolis, IN |
*Non-conference game. ^{#}Rankings from AP Poll. (#) Tournament seedings in parentheses. All times are in Central Time.

== Rankings ==
Ranking movements Legend: ██ Increase in ranking ██ Decrease in ranking — = Not ranked RV = Received votes
| | Week | | | | | | | | | | | | | | | | | | |
| Poll | Pre | 1 | 2 | 3 | 4 | 5 | 6 | 7 | 8 | 9 | 10 | 11 | 12 | 13 | 14 | 15 | 16 | 17 | Final |
|---|---|---|---|---|---|---|---|---|---|---|---|---|---|---|---|---|---|---|---|
| AP | — | — | — | — | — | — | RV | RV | RV | RV | RV | 25 | RV | RV | RV | RV | RV | — | Not released |
| Coaches | — | —^ | — | RV | — | — | RV | RV | RV | RV | RV | 25 | RV | RV | RV | RV | RV | RV | RV |

*AP does not release post-NCAA Tournament rankings
^Coaches did not release a Week 1 poll.
