= 2020–21 Northern Iowa Panthers men's basketball team =

American college basketball season

2020–21 Northern Iowa Panthers men's basketball
- Conference: Missouri Valley Conference
- Record: 10–15 (7–11 MVC)
- Head coach: Ben Jacobson (15th season)
- Assistant coaches: P. J. Hogan; Erik Crawford; Kyle Green
- Home arena: McLeod Center

2020–21 Missouri Valley Conference men's basketball standings
	Conf.				Overall
Team	W		L	PCT	W		L	PCT
No. 17 Loyola Chicago †	16	–	2	.889	26	–	5	.839
Drake	15	–	3	.833	26	–	5	.839
Missouri State	12	–	6	.667	17	–	7	.708
Indiana State	11	–	7	.611	15	–	10	.600
Evansville	7	–	11	.389	9	–	16	.360
Valparaiso	7	–	11	.389	10	–	18	.357
Northern Iowa	7	–	11	.389	10	–	15	.400
Bradley	6	–	12	.333	12	–	16	.429
Southern Illinois	5	–	13	.278	12	–	14	.462
Illinois State	4	–	14	.222	7	–	18	.280
† 2021 MVC tournament winner Rankings from AP poll

The 2020–21 Northern Iowa Panthers men's basketball team represented the University of Northern Iowa during the 2020–21 NCAA Division I men's basketball season. The Panthers, led by 15th-year head coach Ben Jacobson, played their home games at the McLeod Center in Cedar Falls, Iowa as members of the Missouri Valley Conference (MVC). In a season limited due to the ongoing COVID-19 pandemic, the Panthers finished the season 10–15, 7–11 in MVC play, to finish in a three-way tie for fifth place. As the No. 7 seed in the MVC tournament, they defeated Illinois State in the first round before being forced to forfeit their quarterfinal game against Drake due to positive COVID-19 tests.

== Previous season ==
The Panthers finished the 2019–20 season 25–6, 14–4 in MVC play, to win the MVC regular-season championship. They lost in the quarterfinals of the MVC tournament to Drake. As a regular-season conference champion who failed to win their conference tournament, they were set to receive an automatic bid to NIT. However, all postseason tournaments were thereafter canceled due to the ongoing COVID-19 pandemic.

== Offseason ==
=== Departures ===
Name	Number	Pos.	Height	Weight	Year	Hometown	Reason for departure
Logan Wolf	10	G	6'4"	220	Freshman	Cedar Falls, IA	Walk-on and dual-sport athlete (football); left basketball program to focus on football.
Lincoln Conrey	12	F	6'5"	203	Senior	Waterloo, IA	Graduated
Justin Dahl	15	C	7'0"	261	RS Senior	Carver, MN	Graduated
Shandon Goldman	20	F	6'10"	220	Senior	Evansville, AR	Graduated
Isaiah Brown	24	G	6'7"	180	Senior	Flower Mound, TX	Graduated
Spencer Haldeman	30	G	6'1"	175	RS Senior	Peosta, IA	Graduated
Luke McDonnell	34	F	6'9"	212	RS Senior	Dubuque, IA	Graduated

=== 2020 recruiting class ===
College recruiting information
Name	Hometown	School	Height	Weight	Commit date
Nate Heise #0 SG	Lake City, MN	Lincoln High School	6 ft 4 in (1.93 m)	191 lb (87 kg)	May 13, 2019
Nate Heise #0 SG	Recruit ratings: Scout: Rivals: (N/A)				
Bowen Born #13 PG	Norwalk, IA	Norwalk High School	5 ft 11 in (1.80 m)	170 lb (77 kg)	Aug 24, 2019
Bowen Born #13 PG	Recruit ratings: Scout: Rivals: (N/A)				
Tytan Anderson #32 SF	Eldridge, IA	North Scott High School	6 ft 6 in (1.98 m)	185 lb (84 kg)	Aug 14, 2018
Tytan Anderson #32 SF	Recruit ratings: Scout: Rivals: (N/A)				
Overall recruit ranking:
Note: In many cases, Scout, Rivals, 247Sports, On3, and ESPN may conflict in their listings of height and weight.; In these cases, the average was taken. ESPN grades are on a 100-point scale.; Sources: "2020 Team Ranking". Rivals.

=== 2021 recruiting class ===
College recruiting information (2021)
Name	Hometown	School	Height	Weight	Commit date
Michael Duax; SF	Dubuque, IA	Hempstead High School	6 ft 5 in (1.96 m)	200 lb (91 kg)	Feb 11, 2020
Michael Duax; SF	Recruit ratings: Scout: Rivals: (N/A)				
Chase Courbat; C	Cedar Falls, IA	Cedar Falls High School	6 ft 10 in (2.08 m)	230 lb (100 kg)	Aug 26, 2020
Chase Courbat; C	Recruit ratings: Scout: Rivals: (N/A)				
Landon Wolf; SG	Cedar Falls, IA	Cedar Falls High School	6 ft 5 in (1.96 m)	185 lb (84 kg)	Oct 23, 2020
Landon Wolf; SG	Recruit ratings: Scout: Rivals: (N/A)				
Overall recruit ranking:
Note: In many cases, Scout, Rivals, 247Sports, On3, and ESPN may conflict in their listings of height and weight.; In these cases, the average was taken. ESPN grades are on a 100-point scale.; Sources: "2020 Team Ranking". Rivals.

== Roster ==
2020–21 Northern Iowa Panthers men's basketball team
Players
Coaches

Pos.	#	Name	Height	Weight	Year	Previous school	Hometown
G	0	Nate Heise	6 ft 4 in (1.93 m)	191 lb (87 kg)	Fr	Lincoln	Lake City, MN
F	1	Cole Henry	6 ft 9 in (2.06 m)	235 lb (107 kg)	RS Fr	Oskaloosa	Oskaloosa, IA
G	2	Evan Gauger (W)	6 ft 2 in (1.88 m)	175 lb (79 kg)	RS Fr	Indianola	Indianola, IA
G	3	Tywhon Pickford	6 ft 4 in (1.93 m)	200 lb (91 kg)	Sr	Maple Grove	Minneapolis, MN
G	4	A. J. Green (injured)	6 ft 4 in (1.93 m)	190 lb (86 kg)	Jr	Cedar Falls	Cedar Falls, IA
G	11	Trae Berhow	6 ft 5 in (1.96 m)	198 lb (90 kg)	Sr	Watertown Mayer; Pepperdine	Watertown, MN
G	13	Bowen Born	5 ft 11 in (1.8 m)	170 lb (77 kg)	Fr	Norwalk	Norwalk, IA
F	14	Goanar Mar	6 ft 7 in (2.01 m)	215 lb (98 kg)	Sr	DeLaSalle; George Mason	Minneapolis, MN
G	22	Antwan Kimmons	6 ft 0 in (1.83 m)	185 lb (84 kg)	So	Tartan	Oakdale, MN
F	23	Derek Krogmann (W)	6 ft 7 in (2.01 m)	235 lb (107 kg)	RS Fr	West Delaware	Manchester, IA
F	32	Tytan Anderson	6 ft 6 in (1.98 m)	185 lb (84 kg)	Fr	North Scott	Eldridge, IA
F	33	Drew Daniel (W)	6 ft 6 in (1.98 m)	205 lb (93 kg)	Fr	Dowling Catholic	West Des Moines, IA
F	34	James Betz	6 ft 6 in (1.98 m)	226 lb (103 kg)	So	Garner–Hayfield–Ventura	Ventura, IA
F	35	Noah Carter	6 ft 6 in (1.98 m)	229 lb (104 kg)	So	Dubuque Senior	Dubuque, IA
F	50	Austin Phyfe	6 ft 9 in (2.06 m)	235 lb (107 kg)	RS Jr	Waverly-Shell Rock	Waverly, IA

Head coach

- Ben Jacobson (North Dakota)

Assistant coach(es)

- P. J. Hogan (Morningside)
- Erik Crawford (Iowa State)
- Kyle Green (Hamline)

Legend

- (C) Team captain
- (S) Suspended
- (I) Ineligible
- (W) Walk-on
- Injured
- Current redshirt

Roster
Last update: July 28, 2024

== Schedule and results ==
Date time, TV	Rank^{#}	Opponent^{#}	Result	Record	Site (attendance) city, state
Regular season
November 25, 2020*; 3:30 p.m., ESPNU		vs. Western Kentucky; Bad Boy Mowers Crossover Classic	L 87–93	0–1	Sanford Pentagon (0); Sioux Falls, SD
November 26, 2020*; 4:30 p.m., ESPN		vs. Saint Mary's; Bad Boy Mowers Crossover Classic	L 64–66	0–2	Sanford Pentagon (0); Sioux Falls, SD
November 27, 2020*; 3:00 p.m., ESPNU		vs. Utah State; Bad Boy Mowers Crossover Classic	L 71–82	0–3	Sanford Pentagon (0); Sioux Falls, SD
December 4, 2020*; 6:00 p.m., ESPN+		St. Ambrose	W 98–53	1–3	McLeod Center (0); Cedar Falls, IA
December 9, 2020*; 5:00 p.m., ESPN+		at No. 19 Richmond	L 68–78	1–4	Robins Center (0); Richmond, VA
December 27, 2020; 3:00 p.m., ESPN+		Missouri State	L 59–79	1–5 (0–1)	McLeod Center (668); Cedar Falls, IA
December 28, 2020; 7:00 p.m., ESPN+		Missouri State	W 85–75	2–5 (1–1)	McLeod Center (0); Cedar Falls, IA
January 2, 2021; 3:00 p.m., ESPN+		at Evansville	L 61–65	2–6 (1–2)	Ford Center (0); Evansville, IN
January 3, 2021; 3:00 p.m., ESPN+		at Evansville	L 64–70	2–7 (1–3)	Ford Center (0); Evansville, IN
January 10, 2021; 3:00 p.m., ESPN+		Bradley	W 78–72	3–7 (2–3)	McLeod Center (708); Cedar Falls, IA
January 11, 2021; 7:00 p.m., ESPN+		Bradley	L 73–75	3–8 (2–4)	McLeod Center (608); Cedar Falls, IA
January 16, 2021; 5:00 p.m., ESPN2		at Loyola	L 57–72	3–9 (2–5)	Joseph J. Gentile Arena (0); Chicago, IL
January 17, 2021; 4:00 p.m., ESPN		at Loyola	L 46–88	3–10 (2–6)	Joseph J. Gentile Arena (0); Chicago, IL
January 25, 2021*; 6:00 p.m., ESPN+		Coe	W 70–60	4–10	McLeod Center (515); Cedar Falls, IA
January 30, 2021; 3:00 p.m., ESPN3		at Southern Illinois	W 74–62	5–10 (3–6)	Banterra Center (0); Carbondale, IL
January 31, 2021; 5:00 p.m., ESPN2		at Southern Illinois	L 68–71	5–11 (3–7)	Banterra Center (0); Carbondale, IL
February 6, 2021; 5:00 p.m., ESPNU		Indiana State	L 57–61	5–12 (3–8)	McLeod Center (0); Cedar Falls, IA
February 7, 2021; 3:00 p.m., ESPN3		Indiana State	W 70–67	6–12 (4–8)	McLeod Center (826); Cedar Falls, IA
February 10, 2021; 6:00 p.m., CBSSN		at Drake	L 59–80	6–13 (4–9)	Knapp Center (971); Des Moines, IA
February 13, 2021; 6:00 p.m., ESPN+		Valparaiso	L 57–70	6–14 (4–10)	McLeod Center (713); Cedar Falls, IA
February 14, 2021; 6:00 p.m., ESPN+		Valparaiso	W 74–60	7–14 (5–10)	McLeod Center (953); Cedar Falls, IA
February 17, 2021; 7:00 p.m., ESPN+		Drake	L 69–77	7–15 (5–11)	McLeod Center (914); Cedar Falls, IA
February 26, 2021; 8:00 p.m., ESPNU		at Illinois State	W 70–56	8–15 (6–11)	Redbird Arena; Normal, IL
February 27, 2021; 5:00 p.m., CBSSN		at Illinois State	W 94–87 ^{2OT}	9–15 (7–11)	Redbird Arena; Normal, IL
MVC tournament
March 4, 2021; 8:00 p.m., ESPN+	(7)	vs. (10) Illinois State; First round	W 65–60	10–15	Enterprise Center; St. Louis, MO
March 5, 2021; 5:00 p.m., ESPN+	(7)	vs. (2) Drake; Quarterfinals	Forfeit (Note: Prior to the game, the MVC announced that due to a positive COVID-19 test within the Northern Iowa program and subsequent contact tracing, the Panthers would not have enough available players to compete. Therefore, in accordance with policies that had been in place all season, the contest was canceled and the MVC ruled that Drake would advance to the semifinals.)		Enterprise Center; St. Louis, MO
*Non-conference game. ^{#}Rankings from AP poll. (#) Tournament seedings in parentheses. All times are in Central.
