= Cameron Krutwig =

American basketball player (born 1998)

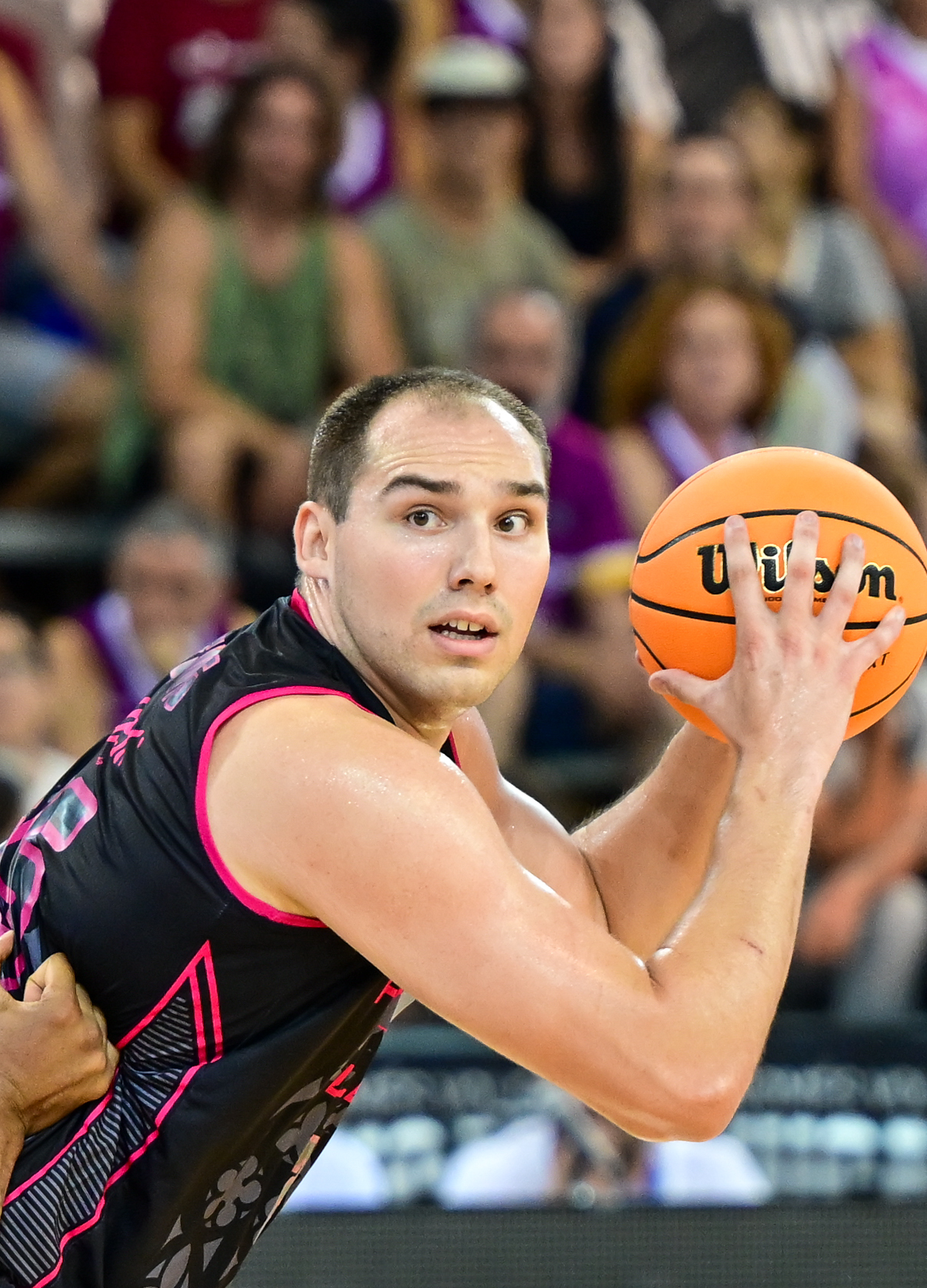
- Krutwig with Força Lleida in 2025

No. 25 – Phoenix Hagen
- Position: Center
- League: Basketball Bundesliga

Personal information
- Born: December 21, 1998 (age 27)
- Listed height: 6 ft 9 in (2.06 m)
- Listed weight: 255 lb (116 kg)

Career information
- High school: Jacobs (Algonquin, Illinois)
- College: Loyola Chicago (2017–2021)
- NBA draft: 2021: undrafted
- Playing career: 2021–present

Career history
- 2021–2022: Telenet Giants Antwerp
- 2022: Blackwater Bossing
- 2022–2023: Ibaraki Robots
- 2023: Betis
- 2023–2024: Força Lleida
- 2024–2025: Palencia
- 2025–2026: Força Lleida
- 2026–present: Phoenix Hagen

Career highlights
- Third-team All-American – AP (2021); MVC Player of the Year (2021); 3× First-team All-MVC (2019–2021); Third-team All-MVC (2018); MVC Freshman of the Year (2018); MVC All-Newcomer Team (2018); MVC tournament MVP (2021)

Cameron David Krutwig (born December 21, 1998) is an American professional basketball player for the Phoenix Hagen of the German Basketball Bundesliga (BBL). Nicknamed "King Krut", he played college basketball for the Loyola Ramblers. Krutwig drew national attention after helping the 2017–18 Ramblers reach the Final Four of the 2018 NCAA tournament.

== High school career ==
His older brother Conrad played collegiately at South Dakota. Cameron Krutwig attended Jacobs High School in Algonquin, Illinois, where he was coached by Jimmy Roberts. As a junior, Krutwig averaged 17.7 points, 12.7 rebounds, 2.5 assists and 2.6 blocks, shooting 65 percent from the field. He led Jacobs to a Fox Valley Conference championship and its second Class 4A regional title in three seasons. In the state sectional semifinal loss to Rockford Auburn, Krutwig had 26 points and 14 rebounds. Krutwig was ranked Illinois's top center in his class by 247Sports. He received more than 20 scholarship offers, and committed to Loyola Chicago in August 2016. As a senior, he led the team to a 30–2 record and a sectional championship. In the sectional final, he nearly posted a quadruple double with 20 points, 24 rebounds, 12 blocks and nine assists.

== College career ==
Krutwig became a starter three games into his freshman season and averaged 10.5 points, 6.1 rebounds and 1.8 assists per game. Coach Porter Moser praised him for his passing acumen and encouraged him to become more physical and score more when conference play began. Krutwig set season highs of 21 points and 13 rebounds in an 81–65 win over Bradley on January 13, 2018. He was named to the Third Team All-Missouri Valley Conference and Freshman of the Year. He received media attention for his Will Ferrell impressions and off-key Christmas caroling. In the NCAA Tournament, he contributed seven points and four assists against Tennessee in a second-round victory. Krutwig helped Loyola to a rare Final Four appearance. Although the Ramblers lost to Michigan 69–57 in the Final Four, Krutwig led the team with 17 points.

Coming into his sophomore season, Krutwig was named to the Preseason Second Team All-MVC. He had a career-high 24 points in a 65–61 loss to Missouri State on February 17, 2019. Krutwig averaged 14.8 points and 7.2 rebounds per game as a sophomore. He was named to the First Team All-MVC.

On November 16, 2019, Krutwig matched his career-high of 24 points in an 85–68 win over Saint Joseph's. On December 18, Krutwig registered a triple-double of 22 points, 10 rebounds, and 10 assists in a 78–70 win over Vanderbilt. At the conclusion of the 2019–20 regular season, Krutwig was named to the First Team All-MVC and received the second-most votes for player of the year behind A. J. Green. On January 11, 2021, in a game against Indiana State, Krutwig became just the fourth player in MVC history to amass 1,500 points, 800 rebounds and 300 assists. The other three players to have done so are College Basketball Hall of Famers Oscar Robertson, Larry Bird and Hersey Hawkins.

At the close of the 2020–21 regular season, Krutwig was named the MVC Player of the Year and his third consecutive first-team All-MVC selection. In the NCAA tournament, Krutwig led the team with 19 points, 12 rebounds, and 5 assists in a second round upset victory over No. 1 seed Illinois. The Ramblers eventually fell to Oregon State in the Sweet Sixteen. After the season, Krutwig announced he would not use his extra year of eligibility and instead declare for the 2021 NBA draft.

== Professional career ==
On June 30, 2021, Krutwig signed his first professional contract with the Telenet Giants Antwerp of the Pro Basketball League.

On August 9, 2022, he signed with the Blackwater Bossing of the Philippine Basketball Association (PBA) as the team's import for the 2022–23 PBA Commissioner's Cup.

On November 29, Krutwig signed with Ibaraki Robots of the Japanese B.League.

In July 2023, Krutwig signed with Real Betis Baloncesto of Spain's LEB Oro basketball league, but was released after the team's ownership changed. He subsequently signed with Força Lleida CE.

On July 14, 2026, he signed with Phoenix Hagen of the German Basketball Bundesliga (BBL).

== Personal life ==
Krutwig is a fan of the Chicago Bears of the National Football League. He is also a harmonicist, and cites the Bee Gees, Hall & Oates, Tears for Fears, and Phil Collins among his favorite artists and influences. Krutwig and his wife, Jess, were married in 2023.

== Career statistics ==
Legend
GP	Games played	GS	Games started	MPG	Minutes per game
FG%	Field goal percentage	3P%	3-point field goal percentage	FT%	Free throw percentage
RPG	Rebounds per game	APG	Assists per game	SPG	Steals per game
BPG	Blocks per game	PPG	Points per game	**Bold**	Career high

=== College ===
Year	Team	GP	GS	MPG	FG%	3P%	FT%	RPG	APG	SPG	BPG	PPG
2017–18	Loyola	**38**	**34**	23.7	.598	–	**.735**	6.1	1.7	.5	.7	10.5
2018–19	Loyola	34	**34**	28.2	**.629**	**.333**	.578	7.2	2.4	.6	1.0	14.8
2019–20	Loyola	32	32	**31.3**	.563	.000	.690	**8.1**	**4.2**	**1.2**	.6	**15.1**
2020–21	Loyola	30	30	28.5	.574	–	.684	7.0	3.0	1.1	**1.1**	15.0
Career		134	130	27.7	.590	.143	.667	7.1	2.8	.8	.9	13.7
