= 2021 Missouri Valley Conference men's basketball tournament =

- Classification: Division I
- Season: 2020–21
- Teams: 10
- Site: Enterprise Center; St. Louis, Missouri
- Champions: Loyola-Chicago (2nd title)
- Winning coach: Porter Moser (2nd title)
- MVP: Cameron Krutwig (Loyola-Chicago)
- Television: CBS, CBSSN, MVC TV

2020–21 Missouri Valley Conference men's basketball standings
	Conf.				Overall
Team	W		L	PCT	W		L	PCT
No. 17 Loyola Chicago †	16	–	2	.889	26	–	5	.839
Drake	15	–	3	.833	26	–	5	.839
Missouri State	12	–	6	.667	17	–	7	.708
Indiana State	11	–	7	.611	15	–	10	.600
Evansville	7	–	11	.389	9	–	16	.360
Valparaiso	7	–	11	.389	10	–	18	.357
Northern Iowa	7	–	11	.389	10	–	15	.400
Bradley	6	–	12	.333	12	–	16	.429
Southern Illinois	5	–	13	.278	12	–	14	.462
Illinois State	4	–	14	.222	7	–	18	.280
† 2021 MVC tournament winner Rankings from AP poll

The 2021 Missouri Valley Conference men's basketball tournament, popularly referred to as "Arch Madness", was a postseason men's basketball tournament that completed the 2020–21 season in the Missouri Valley Conference. The tournament was held at the Enterprise Center in St. Louis, Missouri from March 4–7, 2021.

Despite the conference being the only conference to complete their entire conference schedule in the 2020–21 season, the tournament was marred by a positive COVID test in the Northern Iowa program prior to their quarterfinal matchup against Drake. Despite subsequent negative tests, contact tracing combined with St. Louis health protocols required UNI to forfeit the game advancing Drake to the next round.

== Seeds ==
Teams were seeded by conference record, with ties broken by the overall record in conference games played between the tied teams, then (if necessary) by comparison of records between the tying institutions versus the top team in the standings (and continuing from top to bottom of standings, as necessary, with the team having the better record against that team receiving the better seed). The top six seeds received opening–round byes.

Seed	School	Conference	Tiebreaker 1	Tiebreaker 2
1	Loyola-Chicago	16–2		
2	Drake	15–3		
3	Missouri State	12–6		
4	Indiana State	11–7		
5	Evansville	7–11	4–0 vs. VU, UNI	
6	Valparaiso	7–11	1–3 vs. UE, UNI	0–2 vs. LU, 1–1 vs. DU
7	Northern Iowa	7–11	1–3 vs. UE, VU	0–2 vs. LU, 0–2 vs. DU
8	Bradley	6–12		
9	Southern Illinois	5–13		
10	Illinois State	4–14		

== Schedule ==
Game	Time *	Matchup	Score	Television
Opening Round – Thursday, March 4
1	5:08 pm	#8 Bradley vs. #9 Southern Illinois	63–73	MVC TV
2	8:08 pm	#7 Northern Iowa vs. #10 Illinois State	65–60	MVC TV
Quarterfinals – Friday, March 5
3	11:08 am	#1 Loyola-Chicago vs. #9 Southern Illinois	73–49	MVC TV
4	2:08 pm	#4 Indiana State vs. #5 Evansville	53–43	MVC TV
5	5:08 pm	#2 Drake vs. #7 Northern Iowa	Canceled (Note: Northern Iowa withdrew from the MVC Tournament due to a positive COVID-19 test, which led to the game being cancelled, and Drake advancing in the tournament.)	MVC TV
6	8:08 pm	#3 Missouri State vs. #6 Valparaiso	66–55	MVC TV
Semifinals – Saturday, March 6
7	12:05 pm	#1 Loyola-Chicago vs. #4 Indiana State	65–49	CBSSN
8	3:05 pm	#2 Drake vs. #3 Missouri State	71–69	CBSSN
Final – Sunday, March 7
9	1:10 pm	#1 Loyola-Chicago vs. #2 Drake	75–65	CBS
* Game times in CST; rankings denote tournament seed.

== Tournament bracket ==
Opening Round; Thursday, March 4 MVC TV
8	Bradley	63
9	Southern Illinois	73
7	Northern Iowa	65
10	Illinois State	60

Quarterfinals; Friday, March 5 MVC TV
1	No. 20 Loyola-Chicago	73
9	Southern Illinois	49
4	Indiana State	53
5	Evansville	43
2	Drake
7	~~Northern Iowa~~
3	Missouri State	66
6	Valparaiso	55

Semifinals; Saturday, March 6 CBSSN
1	No. 20 Loyola-Chicago	65
4	Indiana State	49
2	Drake	71
3	Missouri State	69

Final; Sunday, March 7 CBS
1	No. 20 Loyola-Chicago	75
2	Drake	65

=== Postseason History Multiple Bids ===
NCAA tournament
MVC NCAA Tournament Teams
2021	(8) Loyola (Chicago)	(11) Drake
