= 2020–21 Illinois State Redbirds men's basketball team =

American college basketball season

2020–21 Illinois State Redbirds men's basketball
- Conference: Missouri Valley Conference
- Record: 7–18 (4–14 MVC)
- Head coach: Dan Muller (9th season)
- Associate head coach: Brian Jones
- Assistant coaches: Brian Reese; Marcus Belcher
- Home arena: Doug Collins Court at Redbird Arena

2020–21 Missouri Valley Conference men's basketball standings
	Conf.				Overall
Team	W		L	PCT	W		L	PCT
No. 17 Loyola Chicago †	16	–	2	.889	26	–	5	.839
Drake	15	–	3	.833	26	–	5	.839
Missouri State	12	–	6	.667	17	–	7	.708
Indiana State	11	–	7	.611	15	–	10	.600
Evansville	7	–	11	.389	9	–	16	.360
Valparaiso	7	–	11	.389	10	–	18	.357
Northern Iowa	7	–	11	.389	10	–	15	.400
Bradley	6	–	12	.333	12	–	16	.429
Southern Illinois	5	–	13	.278	12	–	14	.462
Illinois State	4	–	14	.222	7	–	18	.280
† 2021 MVC tournament winner Rankings from AP poll

The 2020–21 Illinois State Redbirds men's basketball team represented Illinois State University during the 2020–21 NCAA Division I men's basketball season. The Redbirds, led by ninth-year head coach Dan Muller, played their home games at Doug Collins Court at Redbird Arena in Normal, Illinois as members of the Missouri Valley Conference. In a season limited due to the ongoing COVID-19 pandemic, they finished the season 7–18, 4–14 in MVC play to finish in 10th place. In the MVC tournament, they lost to Northern Iowa in the first round.

== Previous season ==
The Redbirds finished the 2019–20 season 10–21, 5–13 in MVC play to finish in ninth place. In the MVC tournament, they lost to Drake in the first round.

== Offseason ==
=== Departures ===
Name	#	Pos.	Height	Weight	Year	Hometown	Comment
Jaycee Hillsman	25	G	6'6"	230	RS Senior	Champaign, IL	Graduation
Zach Copeland	2	G	6'4"	195	Senior	Oakland, CA	Graduation
Ricky Torres	3	G	6'2"	180	Senior	Pinellas Park, FL	Graduation
Matt Chastain	22	G	6'6"	210	RS Junior	LeRoy, IL	Retired due to injury
Lijah Donnelly	15	G	6'2"	170	RS Junior	Bloomington, IL	Lincoln College
Keith Fisher III	5	F	6'8"	220	RS Junior	Los Angeles, CA	Opted out due to the COVID-19 pandemic
Taylor Bruninga	32	F	6'8"	210	RS Sophomore	Mapleton, IL	Retired due to injury
Rey Idowu	13	F	6'9"	240	Sophomore	Melbourne, FL	Tulsa

=== 2020 recruiting class ===
College recruiting information
Name	Hometown	School	Height	Weight	Commit date
Alston Andrews; F	Detroit, MI	Ocoee High School	6 ft 9 in (2.06 m)	220 lb (100 kg)	Nov 18, 2019
Alston Andrews; F	Recruit ratings: Scout: Rivals: 247Sports: (NR)				
Howard Fleming Jr. G	Louisville, KY	Male High School	6 ft 5 in (1.96 m)	190 lb (86 kg)	Nov 20, 2019
Howard Fleming Jr. G	Recruit ratings: Scout: Rivals: 247Sports: (NR)				
Emon Washington; G	Atlanta, GA	South Cobb High School	6 ft 6 in (1.98 m)	175 lb (79 kg)	Nov 13, 2019
Emon Washington; G	Recruit ratings: Scout: Rivals: 247Sports: (NR)				
Overall recruit ranking:
Note: In many cases, Scout, Rivals, 247Sports, On3, and ESPN may conflict in their listings of height and weight.; In these cases, the average was taken. ESPN grades are on a 100-point scale.; Sources: "2020 Team Ranking". Rivals.

=== Incoming transfers ===
Name	Pos.	Height	Weight	Year	Hometown	Prior school
Sy Chatman	F	6'8"	220	Junior	Minneapolis, MN	UMass
Dusan Mahorcic	F	6'10"	240	Junior	Belgrade, Serbia	Moberly Area Community College
Josiah Strong	G	6'3"	195	Junior	Brooklyn Park, MN	Iowa Western Community College
Alex Kotov	F	6'10"	220	Sophomore	Moscow, Russia	Daytona State College

== Roster ==
2020–21 Illinois State Redbirds men's basketball team
Players
Coaches

Pos.	#	Name	Height	Weight	Year	Previous school	Hometown
G	0	DJ Horne	6 ft 1 in (1.85 m)	175 lb (79 kg)	So	Trinity Academy	Raleigh, NC
G	1	Dedric Boyd	6 ft 4 in (1.93 m)	195 lb (88 kg)	RS Jr	Haywood High School; Eastern Kentucky	Brownsville, TN
G	2	Josiah Strong	6 ft 3 in (1.91 m)	195 lb (88 kg)	Jr	Champlin Park High School; Navy; Iowa Western Community College	Brooklyn Park, MN
G	3	Howard Fleming Jr.	6 ft 5 in (1.96 m)	195 lb (88 kg)	Fr	Male High School	Louisville, KY
F	4	Abdou Ndiaye	6 ft 9 in (2.06 m)	195 lb (88 kg)	RS So	The Nation Christian Academy	Louga, Senegal
G	10	Emon Washington	6 ft 6 in (1.98 m)	190 lb (86 kg)	Fr	South Cobb High School	Atlanta, GA
F	11	Alston Andrews	6 ft 9 in (2.06 m)	230 lb (104 kg)	Fr	Ocoee High School	Detroit, MI
G	12	Antonio Reeves	6 ft 5 in (1.96 m)	185 lb (84 kg)	So	Simeon Career Academy	Chicago, IL
G	14	Nik Stadelman (W)	6 ft 0 in (1.83 m)	180 lb (82 kg)	Fr	Guilford High School	Rockford, IL
F	21	Dusan Mahorcic	6 ft 10 in (2.08 m)	240 lb (109 kg)	Jr	Notre Dame College Prep; Lewis; Moberly Area Community College	Belgrade, Serbia
F	23	Harouna Sissoko	6 ft 7 in (2.01 m)	215 lb (98 kg)	RS Fr	Grand View Christian School	Kayes, Mali
G	24	Jayden Johnson (W)	6 ft 6 in (1.98 m)	205 lb (93 kg)	Fr	Batavia High School	Batavia, IL
F	25	Alex Kotov	6 ft 10 in (2.08 m)	220 lb (100 kg)	So	Montverde Academy; Palm Beach State College; Daytona State College	Moscow, Russia
F	30	Sy Chatman (L)	6 ft 8 in (2.03 m)	220 lb (100 kg)	Jr	Cretin-Derham High School; Massachusetts	Minneapolis, MN
G	34	Malcolm Miller (injured) (W)	6 ft 4 in (1.93 m)	210 lb (95 kg)	RS Fr	Shelbyville High School	Shelbyville, IL

Head coach

- Dan Muller (Illinois State)

Assistant coach(es)

- Brian Jones (Northern Iowa)
- Brian Reese (North Carolina)
- Marcus Belcher (Southern Illinois)

Legend

- (C) Team captain
- (S) Suspended
- (I) Ineligible
- (W) Walk-on
- Injured
- Current redshirt

Roster
Last update: March 24, 2021

NOTE: (L) indicates left team in-season

== Schedule and results ==
Date time, TV	Rank^{#}	Opponent^{#}	Result	Record	High points	High rebounds	High assists	Site (attendance) city, state
Non-Conference Regular Season
November 25, 2020*; 1:00 pm, ESPN		at No. 23 Ohio State; Columbus Multi-Team Event	L 67–94	0–1	17 – Reeves	7 – Reeves	7 – Fleming Jr.	Value City Arena (0); Columbus, OH
November 28, 2020*; 12:00 pm		vs. UMass Lowell; Columbus Multi-Team Event	W 82–72	1–1	21 – Strong	10 – Sissoko	2 – 3 tied	Covelli Center (0); Columbus, OH
December 2, 2020*; 5:00 pm, ESPN3		Greenville	W 177–108	2–1	30 – Washington	7 – 3 tied	11 – Strong	Redbird Arena (0); Normal, IL
December 5, 2020*; 5:00 pm, ESPN+		at Murray State	L 65–76	2–2	16 – Reeves	9 – Mahorcic	5 – Strong	CFSB Center (1,290); Murray, KY
December 12, 2020*; 6:00 pm, ESPN3		at Ball State	L 66–82	2–3	15 – Boyd	13 – Mahorcic	4 – Strong	John E. Worthen Arena (107); Muncie, IN
December 15, 2020*; 2:00 pm, ESPN3		Chicago State	W 91–62	3–3	22 – Horne	9 – Fleming Jr.	6 – Strong	Redbird Arena (0); Normal, IL
Missouri Valley Conference Regular Season
December 27, 2020; 3:00 pm, (FSIN/FSKC/FSMW/NBCSCH)		at Loyola-Chicago	L 60–90	3–4 (0–1)	18 – Horne	8 – Mahorcic	2 – 3 tied	Joseph J. Gentile Arena (0); Chicago, IL
December 28, 2020; 6:00 pm, CBSSN		at Loyola-Chicago	L 55-86	3–5 (0–2)	21 – Strong	6 – Horne	3 – 4 tied	Joseph J. Gentile Arena (0); Chicago, IL
January 2, 2021; 4:30 pm		Valparaiso	postponed due to COVID-19 issues at Valparaiso; rescheduled for January 23, 2021					Redbird Arena; Normal, IL
January 3, 2021; 4:30 pm		Valparaiso	postponed due to COVID-19 issues at Valparaiso; rescheduled for January 24, 2021					Redbird Arena; Normal, IL
January 9, 2021; 1:00 pm, ESPN3		at Evansville	L 48-57	3–6 (0–3)	11 – Reeves	11 – Mahorcic	2 – tied	Ford Center (0); Evansville, IN
January 10, 2021; 1:00 pm, ESPN3		at Evansville	W 73–68	4–6 (1–3)	21 – Reeves	9 – Sissoko	2 – tied	Ford Center (0); Evansville, IN
January 16, 2021; 3:00 pm, MVC-TV		Indiana State	L 65–73	4–7 (1–4)	16 – Horne	9 – Mahorcic	5 – Horne	Redbird Arena (0); Normal, IL
January 17, 2021; 3:00 pm, Marquee		Indiana State	L 68–74	4–8 (1–5)	19 – Boyd	11 – Mahorcic	4 – Strong	Redbird Arena (0); Normal, IL
January 20, 2021; 8:00 pm, Marquee		Bradley; I–74 Rivalry (site swap with February 17, 2021 game)	W 71–56	5–8 (2–5)	23 – Horne	9 – Mahorcic	4 – Fleming Jr.	Redbird Arena (0); Normal, IL
January 23, 2021; 5:00 pm, Marquee		Valparaiso	L 60–69	5–9 (2–6)	19 – Horne	10 – Fleming Jr.	4 – Fleming Jr.	Redbird Arena (0); Normal, IL
January 24, 2021; 5:00 pm, Marquee		Valparaiso	L 66–70	5–10 (2–7)	20 – Horne	6 – tied	3 – tied	Redbird Arena (0); Normal, IL
January 31, 2021; 2:00 pm, ESPN3		at Drake	L 76–78 ^{OT}	5–11 (2–8)	27 – Reeves	7 – Horne	4 – tied	The Knapp Center (947); Des Moines, IA
February 1, 2021; 6:00 pm, ESPN3		at No. 25 Drake	L 60–95	5–12 (2–9)	20 – Reeves	7 – Ndiaye	3 – Fleming Jr.	The Knapp Center (737); Des Moines, IA
February 6, 2021; 2:00 pm, ESPN3		Missouri State	L 67–74	5–13 (2–10)	23 – Horne	8 – Mahorcic	3 – Horne	Redbird Arena (0); Normal, IL
February 7, 2021; 2:00 pm, Marquee		Missouri State	L 62–72	5–14 (2–11)	18 – Horne	15 – Mahorcic	3 – Fleming Jr.	Redbird Arena (0); Normal, IL
February 13, 2021; 3:00 pm, ESPN3		at Southern Illinois	W 80–55	6–14 (3–11)	17 – Horne	10 – Washington	6 – Fleming Jr.	Banterra Center (0); Carbondale, IL
February 14, 2021; 3:00 pm, ESPN3		at Southern Illinois	L 49–59	6–15 (3–12)	14 – Strong	8 – Fleming Jr.	3 – Horne	Banterra Center (0); Carbondale, IL
February 17, 2021; 7:00 pm, ESPN3		at Bradley	rescheduled for February 18, 2021 due to scheduling issues					Carver Arena; Peoria, IL
February 18, 2021; 6:00 pm, ESPN3		at Bradley; I-74 Rivalry	W 88–71	7–15 (4–12)	20 – Washington	8 – Washington	5 – Fleming Jr.	Carver Arena (0); Peoria, IL
February 26, 2021; 8:00 pm, ESPNU		Northern Iowa	L 56–70	7–16 (4–13)	18 – Mahorcic	8 – Mahorcic	4 – Fleming Jr.	Redbird Arena (0); Normal, IL
February 27, 2021; 5:00 pm, CBSSN		Northern Iowa	L 87–94 ^{2OT}	7–17 (4–14)	34 – Horne	9 – Mahorcic	5 – Horne	Redbird Arena (0); Normal, IL
State Farm Missouri Valley Conference {MVC} tournament
March 4, 2021*; 8:08 pm, MVC-TV	(10)	vs. (7) Northern Iowa; Opening Round	L 60–65	7–18	15 – Mahorcic	7 – 3 tied	4 – Horne	Enterprise Center (663); St. Louis, MO
*Non-conference game. ^{#}Rankings from AP Poll. (#) Tournament seedings in parentheses. All times are in Central Time.

NOTE: limited capacity or no spectators allowed per the corresponding local COVID-19 health guidelines.
