= 2026–27 Mid-American Conference men's basketball season =

2025–26 Mid-American Conference men's basketball season
- League: NCAA Division I
- Sport: Basketball
- Teams: 12

Regular season

Tournament
- Venue: Rocket Arena, Cleveland, Ohio

Mid-American men's basketball seasons
- ← 2025–26 2027–28 →

2026–27 Mid-American Conference men's basketball standings
	Conf.				Overall
Team	W		L	PCT	W		L	PCT
Central Michigan	0	–	0	–	4	–	0	1.000
Akron	0	–	0	–	3	–	0	1.000
Bowling Green	0	–	0	–	3	–	0	1.000
Miami (OH)	0	–	0	–	3	–	0	1.000
Western Michigan	0	–	0	–	4	–	1	.800
Eastern Michigan	0	–	0	–	2	–	1	.667
Ohio	0	–	0	–	2	–	1	.667
UMass	0	–	0	–	2	–	1	.667
Buffalo	0	–	0	–	2	–	2	.500
Toledo	0	–	0	–	2	–	3	.400
Ball State	0	–	0	–	1	–	3	.250
Kent State	0	–	0	–	1	–	3	.250
† 2027 MAC tournament winner As of November 18, 2026; Rankings from AP poll

The 2026–27 Mid-American Conference men's basketball season will begin with practices in October 2026, followed by the start of the 2026–27 NCAA Division I men's basketball season in November. Conference play will begin in December 2026 and conclude in March 2027. The 2027 MAC tournament will be held at Rocket Arena in Cleveland, Ohio for the 28th consecutive season. It will be the first MAC season without Northern Illinois since 1996–97. The conference moved to a balanced twenty-two game conference round-robin schedule, where every team can play each other team home and away, for this season.

== Head coaches ==
=== Coaching changes ===
==== Akron ====
On March 30, 2026, John Groce accepted the head coach position at the College of Charleston. Associate head coach Dustin Ford was promoted to head coach.

==== Ball State ====
On March 7, 2026, Ball State fired coach Michael Lewis after a 12–19 season and a 61–64 overall record in four seasons at the school. In March 2026, Ball State hired SMU associate head coach Chris Capko as the new head coach.

==== Eastern Michigan ====
Stan Heath and Eastern Michigan mutually agreed to part ways on March 8, 2026 after a 10–21 season as his contract expired. He was 57–99 in five seasons at the school. On March 17, 2026, Eastern Michigan hired Clemson associate head coach Billy Donlon as the program's 31st head coach.

==== Western Michigan ====
Following a 10–21 season, Western Michigan fired Dwayne Stephens on March 10, 2026. He was 42–84 overall in four seasons. on March 23, 2026, Western Michigan hired Kahil Fennell as the new head coach. Fennel was the head coach at UTRGV for the prior two seasons with a 35–29 overall record.

=== Coaches ===
Team	Head coach	Previous job	Years at school	Overall record	School record	MAC record	MAC titles	MAC Tournament titles	NCAA tournaments	NCAA Final Fours	NCAA Championships
Akron	Dustin Ford	Akron (Assoc. HC)	1	0–0 (–)	0–0 (–)	0–0 (–)	0	0	0	0	0
Ball State	Chris Capko	SMU (Assoc. HC)	1	0–0 (–)	0–0 (–)	0–0 (–)	0	0	0	0	0
Bowling Green	Todd Simon	Southern Utah	4	179–160 (.528)	52–46 (.531)	27–27 (.500)	0	0	0	0	0
Buffalo	George Halcovage	Villanova (Assoc. HC)	4	30–64 (.319)	30–64 (.319)	13–41 (.241)	0	0	0	0	0
Central Michigan	Andy Bronkema	Ferris State	2	288–126 (.696)	10–21 (.323)	6–12 (.333)	0	0	0	0	0
Eastern Michigan	Billy Donlon	Clemson (Assoc. HC)	1	155–133 (.538)	0–0 (–)	0–0 (–)	0	0	0	0	0
Kent State	Rob Senderoff	Kent State (Asst.)	16	312–186 (.627)	312–186 (.627)	163–105 (.608)	1	2	2	0	0
Miami	Travis Steele	Xavier	5	154–98 (.611)	84–48 (.636)	47–25 (.653)	1	0	1	0	0
Ohio	Jeff Boals	Stony Brook	8	184–135 (.577)	129–93 (.581)	73–51 (.589)	0	1	1	0	0
Toledo	Tod Kowalczyk	Green Bay	17	451–323 (.583)	315–211 (.599)	177–108 (.621)	5	0	0	0	0
UMass	Frank Martin	South Carolina	5	350–260 (.574)	62–59 (.512)	7–11 (.389)	0	0	0	0	0
Western Michigan	Kahil Fennell	UT Rio Grande Valley	4	35–29 (.547)	0–0 (–)	0–0 (–)	0	0	0	0	0

Notes:

- Appearances, titles, etc. are from time with current school only.
- Years at school includes 2026–27 season.
- MAC records are from time at current school only.
- All records are through the beginning of the season.

Source -

== Preseason ==
The MAC Men’s & Women’s Basketball Tip-Off was held on Tuesday, October 20, 2026. Each team had their head coach and a student athlete from both the men's and women's basketball team for interviews.

MAC Men's Basketball Preview Coaches & Student-Athletes

- Akron: Head Coach Dustin Ford and Tahj Staveskie (Redshirt Senior Guard
- Ball State: Head Coach Chris Capko and Babatunde Durodola (Junior Forward)
- Bowling Green: Head Coach Todd Simon and Josiah Shackelford (Junior Guard)
- Buffalo: Head Coach George Halcovage III and Drew Steffe (Senior Guard)
- Central Michigan: Head Coach Coach Andy Bronkema and Phat Phat Brooks (Junior Guard)
- Eastern Michigan: Head Coach Billy Donlon and Mohammad Habhab (Redshirt Sophomore Forward)
- Kent State: Head Coach Rob Senderoff and Jamal Sumlin (Redshirt Senior Guard)
- Miami: Head Coach Travis Steele and Luke Skaljac (Junior Guard)
- Ohio: Head Coach Jeff Boals and Javan Simmons (Redshirt Senior Forward)
- Toledo: Head Coach Tod Kowalczyk and Austin Parks (Senior Center)
- UMass: Head Coach Frank Martin and Jayden Ndjigue (Senior Guard/Forward)
- Western Michigan: Head Coach Kahil Fennell and Jaylen Washington (Junior Guard)

=== Preseason men's basketball coaches poll ===
Men's Basketball Preseason Poll
Place	Team	Points	First place votes
1.	Miami	133	9
2.	Toledo	117	2
3.	Akron	110	--
4.	Kent State	108	1
5.	Ohio	82	--
6.	UMass	79	--
7.	Bowling Green	63	--
8.	Western Michigan	58	--
9.	Eastern Michigan	56	--
10.	Buffalo	47	--
11.	Ball State	40	--
12.	Central Michigan	25	--

MAC Tournament Champions:Miami (5), Toledo (2), UMass (2), Kent State (1)

=== MAC Preseason All-Conference ===
Honor	Recipient
Preseason All-MAC First Team	Mohammad Habhab, Eastern Michigan, Forward, R-So.
Preseason All-MAC First Team	Evan Ipsaro, Miami, Guard, Sr.
Preseason All-MAC First Team	Javan Simmons, Ohio, Forward, R-Sr.
Preseason All-MAC First Team	Luke Skaljac, Miami, Guard, Jr.,
Preseason All-MAC First Team	Chansey Willis Jr., Kent State, Guard, Sr.
Preseason All-MAC Second Team	Sean Jones, Toledo, Guard, R-Sr.
Preseason All-MAC Second Team	Evan Mahaffey, Akron, Wing, 5th-Sr
Preseason All-MAC Second Team	Austin Parks, Toledo, Center, Sr.
Preseason All-MAC Second Team	Jackson Paveletzke, Ohio, Guard, 5th-Sr.
Preseason All-MAC Second Team	Tahj Staveskie, Akron, Guard, R-Sr.

== See also ==
2026–27 Mid-American Conference women's basketball season
