= 2021–22 Ohio Bobcats men's basketball team =

American college basketball season

2021–22 Ohio Bobcats men's basketball

CBI, Quarterfinals
- Conference: Mid-American Conference
- Record: 25–10 (14–6 MAC)
- Head coach: Jeff Boals (3rd season)
- Assistant coaches: Lamar Thornton (3rd season); Kyle Barlow (3rd season); Lee Martin (2nd season)
- Home arena: Convocation Center

2021–22 Mid-American Conference men's basketball standings
	Conf.				Overall
Team	W		L	PCT	W		L	PCT
Toledo	17	–	3	.850	26	–	8	.765
Kent State	16	–	4	.800	23	–	11	.676
Ohio	14	–	6	.700	25	–	10	.714
Akron †	14	–	6	.700	24	–	10	.706
Buffalo	13	–	6	.684	19	–	11	.633
Ball State	9	–	10	.474	14	–	17	.452
Miami (OH)	8	–	12	.400	14	–	18	.438
Central Michigan	6	–	12	.333	7	–	23	.233
Bowling Green	6	–	14	.300	13	–	18	.419
Northern Illinois	6	–	14	.300	9	–	21	.300
Eastern Michigan	5	–	15	.250	10	–	21	.323
Western Michigan	4	–	16	.200	8	–	23	.258
† 2022 MAC tournament winner

The 2021–22 Ohio University Bobcats men's basketball team represented Ohio University for the 2021–22 NCAA Division I men's basketball season. The Bobcats were led by third-year head coach Jeff Boals, who was a 1995 graduate of Ohio University. The team played their home games at the Convocation Center in Athens, Ohio as a member of the Mid-American Conference.

Ohio completed non-conference play with a record of 9–2 with wins over OVC favorite Belmont, Horizon favorite Cleveland St., and rival Marshall with losses only to Kentucky and LSU. Ohio opened conference play 5–0 to extend their winning streak to nine games. Ohio lost to Toledo in the next game and fell into second place in the MAC standings. After a win against Western Michigan, Ohio regained first place with a conference record of 10–1. With an overall record of 19–3, they stood alone in Ohio basketball history for the best record after 22 games. Their five-game winning streak was snapped in the following game with a second loss to Toledo which left both teams with two losses in MAC conference play. After three consecutive wins following the Toledo loss, the Bobcats then lost 4 out of their last 5 conference games and finished the regular season 23–8 and 14–6 in conference play which was tied for third place in the MAC. During the lone win with that five game stretch, starting power forward Ben Vander Plas scored the fourth triple double in program history in a win against Central Michigan. After the regular season Vander Plas was named the Division I Academic All-American of the Year

After defeating Ball State in the quarterfinals, the Bobcats lost to Kent State in the semi-finals of the MAC tournament. Ohio was the #3 seed in the CBI. They defeated Rice in the first round before losing to Abilene Christian in the second round.

== Previous season ==
In a season limited due to the ongoing COVID-19 pandemic, the Bobcats finished the 2020–21 season 17–8, 9–5 in MAC play to finish in fourth place. As the No. 5 seed in the MAC tournament, they defeated Kent State, Toledo, and Buffalo to win the tournament championship. As a result, they received the conference's automatic bid to the NCAA tournament as the No. 13 seed in the West region. There they upset No. 4-seeded ACC champion Virginia in the first round before losing to No. 5-seeded Creighton in the second round.

== Offseason ==
During the offseason, point guard Jason Preston declared for the NBA draft, while 2021 starting forward Dwight Wilson III suffered a season-ending injury.

=== 2022 NBA draft ===
NBA draft
Round	Pick	Player	Position	NBA Team
Jason Preston	2	33	PG	Orlando Magic (rights traded to LA Clippers)

=== Departures ===
Departures
Name	Number	Pos.	Height	Weight	Year	Hometown	Reason
Jason Preston	0	G	6'4"	187	Junior	Orlando, Florida	Declared for NBA draft
Jalen White	21	G	6'5"	180	Freshman	Pasadena, Texas	Transferred to Nicholls State
Nolan Foster	22	C	6'10"	222	Sophomore	Mattawan, Michigan	Transferred to Marian University
Rifen Miguel	23	F	6'8"	240	Junior	Luanda, Angola	Transferred to Troy
Mason McMurray	24	F	6'7"	220	RS sophomore	Stow, Ohio	Transferred to USC-Aiken

=== Incoming transfers ===
Incoming transfers
Name	Number	Pos.	Height	Weight	Year	Hometown	Reason
Tommy Schmock	22	G	5'11"	180	Senior	Cleveland, Ohio	Transferred from Findlay. Had one year of eligibility remaining.
Jason Carter	30	F	6'8"	227	RS senior	Johnstown, Ohio	Transferred from Xavier. Had one year of eligibility remaining.
Luke Frazier*	13	G	6'5"	170	Freshman	Mentor, Ohio	Transferred from Dayton. Will have four years of eligibility remaining.

* Walk-on in 2021–22

=== Recruiting class ===
College recruiting
Name	Hometown	School	Height	Weight	Commit date
AJ Clayton; PF	Duncan Falls, OH	Philo	6 ft 7 in (2.01 m)	195 lb (88 kg)	Jul 26, 2020
AJ Clayton; PF	Recruit ratings: Scout: Rivals: 247Sports: (78)				
IJ Ezuma; PF	Raleigh, NC	Hargrave Military Academy	6 ft 8 in (2.03 m)	240 lb (110 kg)	
IJ Ezuma; PF	Recruit ratings: Scout: Rivals: 247Sports: (NR)				
Olumide Adelodun; SF	Calgary, AB	Canada Topflight Academy West	6 ft 6 in (1.98 m)	215 lb (98 kg)	
Olumide Adelodun; SF	Recruit ratings: Scout: Rivals: 247Sports: (NR)				
Overall recruit ranking:
Note: In many cases, Scout, Rivals, 247Sports, On3, and ESPN may conflict in their listings of height and weight.; In these cases, the average was taken. ESPN grades are on a 100-point scale.; Sources: "2021 Team Ranking". Rivals.

== Preseason ==
Before the season, Ohio was picked second in the MAC preseason poll. Ben Vander Plas was named to the preseason first team all-conference, while Jason Carter was on the second team.

=== Preseason rankings ===
MAC preseason poll
Predicted finish	Team	Votes (1st place)
1	Buffalo	143 (11)
2	Ohio	126
3	Toledo	107 (1)
4	Kent State	98
5	Akron	95
6	Bowling Green	93
7	Miami	92
8	Ball State	54
9	Western Michigan	44
10	Central Michigan	34
11	Eastern Michigan	29
12	Northern Illinois	21

MAC Tournament Champions: Buffalo (8), Bowling Green (1), Kent State (1), Miami (1), Toledo (1)

=== Preseason All-MAC ===
Preseason All-MAC teams
Team	Player	Position	Year
1st	Ben Vander Plas	F	Sr.
2nd	Jason Carter	F	GS

== Roster ==
2021–22 Ohio Bobcats men's basketball team
Players
Coaches

Pos.	#	Name	Height	Weight	Year	Previous school	Hometown
G	1	Mark Sears	6 ft 1 in (1.85 m)	185 lb (84 kg)	So	Hargrave	Muscle Shoals, Alabama
G	2	Miles Brown	6 ft 1 in (1.85 m)	180 lb (82 kg)	Jr	Northstar Christian	Rochester, New York
F	3	Ben Roderick	6 ft 5 in (1.96 m)	205 lb (93 kg)	Jr	Olentangy Liberty	Powell, Ohio
F	4	Dwight Wilson III (injured) (redshirt)	6 ft 8 in (2.03 m)	250 lb (113 kg)	GS	Lincoln	Tallahassee, Florida
F	5	Ben Vander Plas	6 ft 8 in (2.03 m)	232 lb (105 kg)	RS Sr	Ripon	Ripon, Wisconsin
G	10	Olumide Adelodun	6 ft 6 in (1.98 m)	215 lb (98 kg)	Fr	Canada Topflight Academy West	Calgary, Alberta
F	11	Sam Towns	6 ft 9 in (2.06 m)	190 lb (86 kg)	So	Pickerington Central	Columbus, Ohio
G	12	John Tenerowicz (W)	6 ft 1 in (1.85 m)	185 lb (84 kg)	Sr	St. Ignatius	Cleveland, Ohio
G	13	Luke Frazier (W)	6 ft 5 in (1.96 m)	170 lb (77 kg)	So	Lake Catholic	Mentor, Ohio
G	14	Michael Brown, Jr. (W)	5 ft 10 in (1.78 m)	156 lb (71 kg)	Jr	Northstar Christian	Rochester, New York
G	15	Lunden McDay	6 ft 3 in (1.91 m)	185 lb (84 kg)	Jr	St. Vincent–St. Mary	Akron, Ohio
F	21	IJ Ezuma	6 ft 8 in (2.03 m)	240 lb (109 kg)	Fr	Hargrave Military Academy	Raleigh, North Carolina
G	22	Tommy Schmock	5 ft 11 in (1.8 m)	180 lb (82 kg)	Sr	St. Edward	Cleveland, Ohio
F	23	AJ Clayton	6 ft 7 in (2.01 m)	195 lb (88 kg)	Fr	Philo	Duncan Falls, Ohio
G	24	Josh McDaniel (W)	6 ft 4 in (1.93 m)	230 lb (104 kg)	Sr	Westerville Central	Westerville, Ohio
F	30	Jason Carter	6 ft 8 in (2.03 m)	227 lb (103 kg)	GS	Johnstown-Monroe	Johnstown, Ohio
F	32	Colin Granger	6 ft 9 in (2.06 m)	230 lb (104 kg)	So	Lambert	Suwanee, Georgia

Head coach

- Jeff Boals (Ohio)

Assistant coach(es)

- Lamar Thornton (Ohio Dominican)
- Kyle Barlow (Concordia–Ann Arbor)
- Lee Martin (Catawba)

Legend

- (C) Team captain
- (S) Suspended
- (I) Ineligible
- (W) Walk-on
- Injured
- Current redshirt

Roster

=== Support staff ===
2021-22 Ohio Bobcats support staff
Jake Ness - director of basketball operations; Mike Cifliku - graduate assistant	Source:

== Schedule and results ==
Date time, TV	Rank^{#}	Opponent^{#}	Result	Record	High points	High rebounds	High assists	Site (attendance) city, state
Exhibition
November 6, 2021*; 2:00 pm		Capital	W 92–66		17 – Schmock	7 – Towns	4 – Sears	Convocation Center (6,362); Athens, OH
Non-conference regular season
November 9, 2021*; 7:00 pm, ESPN+		Belmont	W 92–80	1–0	27 – Sears	10 – Carter	7 – Vander Plas	Convocation Center (6,123); Athens, OH
November 13, 2021*; 7:00 pm, ESPN+		at Cleveland State	W 67–56	2–0	15 – Sears	9 – Vander Plas	5 – 2 Tied	Wolstein Center (3,166); Cleveland, OH
November 15, 2021*; 7:00 pm, ESPN3		Robert Morris; Kentucky Classic	W 85–72	3–0	18 – Carter	11 – 2 Tied	3 – Carter	Convocation Center (6,180); Athens, OH
November 19, 2021*; 7:00 pm, SECN		at No. 13 Kentucky; Kentucky Classic	L 59–77	3–1	19 – Vander Plas	6 – Vander Plas	5 – Sears	Rupp Arena (19,045); Lexington, KY
November 22, 2021*; 7:00 pm, ESPN+		Mount St. Mary's; Kentucky Classic	W 73–59	4–1	15 – Sears	7 – Carter	7 – Sears	Convocation Center (5,178); Athens, OH
November 26, 2021*; 4:00 pm, ESPN3		Concordia (MI)	W 88–68	5–1	19 – Brown	7 – Carter	4 – Tied	Convocation Center (4,350); Athens, OH
December 1, 2021*; 7:00 pm, SECN+/ESPN+		at LSU	L 51–66	5–2	12 – Vander Plas	9 – Carter	3 – Carter	Pete Maravich Assembly Center (11,328); Baton Rouge, LA
December 4, 2021*; 3:30 pm, ESPN3		Saint Francis (PA)	W 78–75	6–2	24 – Sears	8 – Sears	6 – Schmock	Convocation Center (4,371); Athens, OH
December 11, 2021*; 3:00 pm, ESPN+		at Stetson	W 55–45	7–2	13 – Sears	9 – Vander Plas	2 – 2 Tied	Edmunds Center (473); DeLand, FL
December 15, 2021*; 7:00 pm, ESPN+		Marshall	W 75–65	8–2	24 – Sears	9 – Carter	4 – Vander Plas	Convocation Center (6,227); Athens, OH
December 21, 2021*; 12:00 pm		USC Upstate	W 85–70	9–2	33 – Sears	8 – Sears	4 – Vander Plas	Convocation Center (2,517); Athens, OH
MAC regular season
December 28, 2021; 7:00 pm, ESPN3		Eastern Michigan	Postponed due to COVID-19 issues					Convocation Center; Athens, OH
January 1, 2022; 3:30 pm, ESPN3		at Western Michigan	W 59–47	10–2 (1–0)	21 – Sears	8 – Carter	2 – Sears	University Arena (1,353); Kalamazoo, MI
January 4, 2022; 6:00 pm, CBSSN		at Akron	W 69–63	11–2 (2–0)	24 – Sears	8 – Sears	5 – Sears	James A. Rhodes Arena (1,750); Akron, OH
January 7, 2022; 6:30 pm, CBSSN		Kent State	W 80–72	12–2 (3–0)	28 – Sears	8 – Carter	5 – Vander Plas	Convocation Center (4,576); Athens, OH
January 11, 2022; 7:00 pm, ESPN3		Bowling Green	W 85–78	13–2 (4–0)	22 – Carter	8 – Carter	4 – Vander Plas	Convocation Center (6,811); Athens, OH
January 15, 2022; 4:30 pm, ESPN3		at Central Michigan	Postponed due to COVID-19 issues					McGuirk Arena; Mount Pleasant, MI
January 18, 2022; 7:00 pm, ESPN3		at Miami (OH)	W 86–63	14–2 (5–0)	23 – Vander Plas	9 – Towns	9 – Sears	Millett Hall (1,311); Oxford, OH
January 21, 2022; 6:00 pm, CBSSN		Toledo	L 69–87	14–3 (5–1)	19 – Carter	7 – Tied	4 – Brown	Convocation Center (8,069); Athens, OH
January 25, 2022; 7:00 pm, ESPN+		Northern Illinois	W 74–62	15–3 (6–1)	25 – Sears	8 – Carter	6 – Sears	Convocation Center (4,783); Athens, OH
January 29, 2022; 7:00 pm, ESPNU		at Buffalo	W 74–53	16–3 (7–1)	27 – Sears	11 – Vander Plas	4 – Sears	Alumni Arena (2,131); Buffalo, NY
February 1, 2022; 7:00 pm, ESPN3		Ball State	W 87–63	17–3 (8–1)	18 – 2 Tied	7 – Vander Plas	6 – Sears	Convocation Center (4,721); Athens, OH
February 3, 2022; 2:00 pm, ESPN3		Eastern Michigan; Resched. from Dec. 28	W 81–68	18–3 (9–1)	20 – Sears	8 – Carter	5 – Sears	Convocation Center (3,121); Athens, OH
February 5, 2022; 2:00 pm, ESPN3		Western Michigan	W 77-64	19–3 (10–1)	27 – Carter	11 – Vander Plas	6 – Sears	Convocation Center (7,588); Athens, OH
February 8, 2022; 7:00 pm, ESPN3		at Toledo	L 62–77	19–4 (10–2)	17 – Schmock	8 – Vander Plas	6 – Vander Plas	Savage Arena (5,881); Toledo, OH
February 10, 2022; 7:00 pm, ESPN+		at Central Michigan; Resched. from Jan. 15	W 81–72	20–4 (11–2)	24 – Vander Plas	7 – Roderick	6 – Vander Plas	McGuirk Arena (1,286); Mount Pleasant, MI
February 12, 2022; 3:30 pm, ESPN3		at Eastern Michigan	W 74-56	21–4 (12–2)	27 – Sears	12 – Brown	5 – Sears	George Gervin GameAbove Center (1,208); Ypsilanti, MI
February 15, 2022; 7:00 pm, ESPN3		Miami (OH)	W 91–78	22–4 (13–2)	30 – Vander Plas	11 – Sears	6 – Tied	Convocation Center (7,990); Athens, OH
February 18, 2022; 7:00 pm, CBSSN		at Kent State	L 52–75	22–5 (13–3)	12 – Carter	8 – Vander Plas	3 – Roderick	MAC Center (4,875); Kent, OH
February 22, 2022; 7:00 pm, ESPN3		Central Michigan	W 76–50	23–5 (14–3)	23 – Schmock	10 – Vander Plas	10 – Vander Plas	Convocation Center (5,861); Athens, OH
February 25, 2022; 6:00 pm, CBSSN		Akron	L 83–91	23–6 (14–4)	20 – Sears	7 – Sears	7 – Sears	Convocation Center (8,896); Athens, OH
March 1, 2022; 7:00 pm, ESPN+		at Bowling Green	L 77–80	23–7 (14–5)	25 – Vander Plas	13 – Sears	5 – Sears	Stroh Center (2,068); Bowling Green, OH
March 4, 2022; 8:00 pm, ESPN+		at Northern Illinois	L 57–58	23–8 (14–6)	19 – Sears	8 – Sears	8 – Sears	Convocation Center (794); DeKalb, IL
MAC Tournament
March 10, 2022; 6:30 p.m., ESPN+	(3)	vs. (6) Ball State; Quarterfinals	W 77–67	24–8	24 – Sears	18 – Carter	5 – Sears	Rocket Mortgage FieldHouse; Cleveland, OH
March 11, 2022; 6:30 p.m., CBSSN	(3)	vs. (2) Kent State; Semi-finals	L 61–67	24–9	20 – Vander Plas	7 – Carter	2 – Vander Plas	Rocket Mortgage FieldHouse; Cleveland, OH
MAC Tournament
March 19, 2022; 7:30 p.m., FloHoops	(3)	vs. (14) Rice; First Round	W 65–64	25–9	26 – Carter	12 – Carter	3 – Vander Plas	Ocean Center (799); Daytona Beach, FL
March 21, 2022; 8:30 p.m., FloHoops	(3)	vs. (6) Abilene Christian; Quarterfinals	L 86–91	25–10	35 – Sears	11 – Vander Plas	4 – Vander Plas	Ocean Center (706); Daytona Beach, FL
*Non-conference game. ^{#}Rankings from AP Poll. (#) Tournament seedings in parentheses. All times are in Eastern Time.

== Statistics ==
=== Team statistics ===
Final 2021–22 statistics

Record	Ohio	OPP
Scoring	2591	2378
Scoring average	74.03	67.94
Field goals – att	898–2084	868–1958
3-pt. field goals – att	316–942	231–734
Free throws – att	479–657	411–540
Rebounds	1194	1225
Assists	441	397
Turnovers	368	498
Steals	263	199
Blocked shots	91	114

=== Player statistics ===
			Minutes		Scoring		Total FGs			3-point FGs			Free-throws			Rebounds								
Player	GP	GS	Tot	Avg	Pts	Avg	FG	FGA	Pct	3FG	3FA	Pct	FT	FTA	Pct	Off	Def	Tot	Avg	A	PF	TO	Stl	Blk
Mark Sears	35	35	1250	35.7	686	19.6	218	491	0.444	60	147	0.408	190	215	0.884	69	141	210	6	144	66	112	59	4
Ben Vander Plas	35	35	1237	35.3	499	14.3	166	363	0.457	67	198	0.338	100	138	0.725	40	197	237	6.8	107	81	63	62	16
Jason Carter	34	34	975	28.7	464	13.6	190	405	0.469	23	95	0.242	61	101	0.604	74	153	227	6.7	39	67	42	41	36
Tommy Schmock	35	2	762	21.8	232	6.6	77	199	0.387	60	159	0.377	18	26	0.692	5	63	68	1.9	54	57	27	27	2
Ben Roderick	33	33	812	24.6	224	6.8	77	224	0.344	28	126	0.222	42	67	0.627	30	71	101	3.1	27	67	26	21	3
Miles Brown	31	30	917	29.6	218	7	72	171	0.421	41	106	0.387	33	44	0.75	12	67	79	2.5	47	53	32	32	7
AJ Clayton	34	0	340	10	113	3.3	40	94	0.426	26	68	0.382	7	14	0.5	24	45	69	2	10	35	10	4	10
Sam Towns	27	2	278	10.3	56	2.1	23	57	0.404	3	18	0.167	7	14	0.5	27	41	68	2.5	6	25	18	12	3
IJ Ezuma	28	1	188	6.7	44	1.6	17	38	0.447	0	1	0	10	21	0.476	15	18	33	1.2	4	36	10	2	9
Lunden McDay	5	0	96	19.2	28	5.6	9	20	0.45	5	11	0.455	5	6	0.833	3	3	6	1.2	1	5	1	2	0
Michael Brown	3	2	68	22.7	10	3.3	3	6	0.5	1	4	0.25	3	4	0.75	1	2	3	1	0	2	1	0	0
Olumide Adelodun	13	0	39	3	8	0.6	3	11	0.273	2	8	0.25	0	0	0	1	3	4	0.3	2	5	4	1	1
Luke Frazier	5	0	11	2.2	4	0.8	2	3	0.667	0	0	0	0	2	0	0	0	0	0	0	0	0	0	0
John Tenerowicz	3	0	9	3	4	1.3	1	1	1	0	0	0	2	2	1	0	1	1	0.3	0	2	1	0	0
Josh McDaniel	2	0	6	3	1	0.5	0	1	0	0	1	0	1	3	0.333	0	0	0	0	0	2	0	0	0
Colin Granger	3	0	12	4	0	0	0	0	0	0	0	0	0	0	0	0	2	2	0.7	0	2	2	0	0
Total	35	-	7000	-	2591	74.0	898	2084	0.431	316	942	0.335	479	657	0.729	351	843	1194	34.1	441	505	368	263	91
Opponents	35	-	7000	-	2378	67.9	868	1958	0.443	231	734	0.315	411	540	0.761	295	930	1225	35.0	397	641	498	199	114

Legend
GP	Games played	GS	Games started	Avg	Average per game
FG	Field-goals made	FGA	Field-goal attempts	Off	Offensive rebounds
Def	Defensive rebounds	A	Assists	TO	Turnovers
Blk	Blocks	Stl	Steals	High	Team high

=== Team and individual highs ===
==== Team game highs ====
Team game highs
Stat	High	Opponent	Date
Points	92	Belmont	November 9, 2021
Field goals made	33	Belmont	November 9, 2021
Field goal attempts	75	Bowling Green	March 1, 2022
3 points made	16	Belmont	November 9, 2021
3 points attempted	41	Bowling Green	March 1, 2022
Free throws made	26	USC Upstate	December 21, 2021
Free throw attempts	33	USC Upstate \ Kent State	December 21, 2021 \ February 22, 2022
Rebounds	43	Bowling Green \ Central Michigan	January 1, 2020 \ February 22, 2022
Assists	22	Central Michigan	February 22, 2022
Steals	13	Concordia	November 26, 2021
Blocked shots	7	Saint Francis (PA)	December 4, 2021
Turnovers	20	Saint Francis (PA)	December 4, 2021
Fouls	24	Akron	February 25, 2022

==== Individual game highs ====
Individual game highs
Stat	High	Player	Opponent	Date
Points	35	Mark Sears	Abilene Christian	March 21, 2022
Field goals made	12	Jason Carter	Western Michigan	February 5, 2021
Field goal attempts	20	Mark Sears	Miami (OH)	February 15, 2022
3 points made	7	Tommy Schmock	Central Michigan	February 22, 2022
3 points attempted	14	Tommy Schmock	Central Michigan	February 22, 2022
Free throws made	14	Mark Sears	Abilene Christian	March 21, 2022
Free throw attempts	19	Mark Sears	Abilene Christian	March 21, 2022
Rebounds	18	Jason Carter	Ball State	March 10, 2022
Assists	10	Ben Vander Plas	Central Michigan	February 22, 2022
Steals	5	Mark Sears	Concordia	November 26, 2021
Blocked shots	3	Jason Carter	3 games	
Turnovers	8	Mark Sears	Saint Francis (PA)	December 4, 2021
Fouls	5	Various		

== Awards and honors ==
=== Weekly awards ===
Weekly award honors
Honors	Player	Position	Date awarded	Source
MAC Player of the Week	Mark Sears	G	November 15	
MAC Player of the Week	Mark Sears	G	December 20	
MAC Player of the Week	Mark Sears	G	December 27	
MAC Player of the Week	Mark Sears	G	January 10	
MAC Player of the Week	Mark Sears	G	January 31	
MAC Player of the Week	Jason Carter	F	February 7	

=== Midseason awards watchlists ===
Midseason award honors
Honors	Player	Position	Year	Source
Lou Henson National Player of the Year	Mark Sears	G	So.	

=== All-MAC Awards ===
Postseason All-MAC teams
Team	Player	Position	Year
1st	Mark Sears	G	So.
1st	Ben Vander Plas	F	Sr.
3rd	Jason Carter	F	GS

=== National awards ===
National award honors
Honors	Player	Position	Ref.
Division I Academic All-American of the Year	Ben Vander Plas	F	

== Rankings ==
Ranking movements Legend: ██ Increase in ranking ██ Decrease in ranking — = Not ranked RV = Received votes
	Week																				
Poll	Pre	1	2	3	4	5	6	7	8	9	10	11	12	13	14	15	16	17	18	19	Final
AP	—	RV	RV	RV	—	—	—	—	—	—	—	—	—	—	RV	—	—	—	—	—	Not released
Coaches	—	—^	—	—	—	—	—	—	—	—	—	—	—	—	—	—	—	—	—	—	

*AP does not release post-NCAA Tournament rankings.
^Coaches do not release a Week 1 poll.
