= 2026–27 Akron Zips men's basketball team =

American college basketball season

2026–27 Akron Zips men's basketball
- Conference: Mid-American Conference
- Record: 3–1 (0–0 MAC)
- Head coach: Dustin Ford (1st season)
- Associate head coach: Jay Shunnar (1st season)
- Assistant coaches: Devan Morrow (3rd season); Joshua Jones (1st season); Todd May (1st season)
- Home arena: James A. Rhodes Arena

2026–27 Mid-American Conference men's basketball standings
	Conf.				Overall
Team	W		L	PCT	W		L	PCT
Miami (OH)	0	–	0	–	3	–	0	1.000
Central Michigan	0	–	0	–	4	–	1	.800
Western Michigan	0	–	0	–	4	–	1	.800
Akron	0	–	0	–	3	–	1	.750
Bowling Green	0	–	0	–	3	–	1	.750
Eastern Michigan	0	–	0	–	2	–	1	.667
Ohio	0	–	0	–	2	–	1	.667
Buffalo	0	–	0	–	2	–	2	.500
UMass	0	–	0	–	2	–	2	.500
Toledo	0	–	0	–	2	–	3	.400
Kent State	0	–	0	–	1	–	3	.250
Ball State	0	–	0	–	1	–	4	.200
† 2027 MAC tournament winner As of November 19, 2026; Rankings from AP poll

The 2026–27 Akron Zips men's basketball team represented the University of Akron during the 2026–27 NCAA Division I men's basketball season. The Zips, led by first-year head coach Dustin Ford, play their home games at the James A. Rhodes Arena in Akron, Ohio as members of the Mid-American Conference.

== Previous season ==
The Zips finished second in the MAC with a 17–1 record and won the MAC tournament besting the fourth seeded Toledo 79–76. As a 12 seed, they lost their first-round matchup in the NCAA tournament to Texas Tech 71–91.

Following the conclusion of the 2025–26 season, John Groce decided to step down as head coach of the team, which led to Dustin Ford being given the job to replace Groce.

== Offseason ==
=== Departures ===
Departures
Name	Number	Pos.	Height	Weight	Year	Hometown	Reason for departure
Amani Lyles	0	F	6' 9"	240	Sr	Columbus, Ohio	Transferred to Cincinnati
Shammah Scott	1	G	6' 2"	200	Gr	Cleveland, Ohio	Graduated
Rich Brisco	2	F	6' 8"	240	R-Fr	Brooklyn, New York	Transferred to Rider
Sharron Young	3	G	6' 0"	160	So	Morgantown, West Virginia	Transferred to Western Kentucky
Eric Mahaffey	4	G	6' 6"	200	R-Fr	Cincinnati, Ohio	Transferred to Cincinnati
Tavari Johnson	5	G	6' 0"	170	Sr	La Grange Park, Illinois	Transferred to Charleston
Conner Groce	11	G	6' 0"	165	R-Fr	Champaign, Illinois	Transferred to Charleston
Bowen Hardman	15	G	6' 3"	190	Sr	Cincinnati, Ohio	Personal Reasons
Ognjen Stankovic	16	W	6' 8"	205	Fr	Belgrade, Serbia	Transferred to Manhattan

=== Incoming transfers ===
Incoming transfers
Name	Number	Pos.	Height	Weight	Year	Hometown	Previous school
Exavier Wilson	1	G	6' 1"	170	R-Fr	Columbia, Missouri	Kansas State
Tahj Staveskie	2	G	6' 1"	185	R-Sr	Sandusky, Ohio	Incarnate Word
Buddy Hammer Jr.	4	F	6' 7"	215	Sr	Westville, Oklahoma	North Texas
Ty Pence	8	G	6' 6"	205	Sr	St. Joseph, Illinois	Illinois State
Max Burton	10	F	6' 10"	240	R-Sr	Williamston, Michigan	Western Michigan
Kamrin Oriol	11	G	6' 3"	190	Gr	St. Petersburg, Florida	North Florida
Colin White	22	F	6' 6"	220	Jr	Ottawa, Ohio	Ohio State

=== Recruiting class ===
College recruiting
Name	Hometown	School	Height	Weight	Commit date
RJ Jones; SG	Cleveland, Ohio	St. Ignatius High School	6 ft 4 in (1.93 m)	175 lb (79 kg)	Jun 19, 2025
RJ Jones; SG	Recruit ratings: Rivals: 247Sports: ESPN: (N/A)				
Devan Christion; PF	Las Vegas, Nevada	Ed W. Clark High School	6 ft 9 in (2.06 m)	N/A	Oct 7, 2025
Devan Christion; PF	Recruit ratings: Rivals: 247Sports: ESPN: (N/A)				
Overall recruit ranking:
Note: In many cases, Scout, Rivals, 247Sports, On3, and ESPN may conflict in their listings of height and weight.; In these cases, the average was taken. ESPN grades are on a 100-point scale.; Sources: "2026 Team Ranking". Rivals.

== Preseason ==
On October 20, 2026, the MAC released the preseason coaches poll. Akron was picked to finish third in the MAC regular season.

=== Preseason rankings ===
MAC preseason poll
Predicted finish	Team	Votes (1st place)
1	Miami (OH)	130 (9)
2	Toledo	117 (2)
3	Akron	110
4	Kent State	108 (1)
5	Ohio	82
6	UMass	79
7	Bowling Green	63
8	Western Michigan	58
9	Eastern Michigan	56
10	Buffalo	47
11	Ball State	40
12	Central Michigan	25

MAC Tournament Champions: Miami (OH) (5), Toledo (4), UMass (2), Kent State (1)

=== Preseason All-MAC ===
Preseason All-MAC teams
Team	Player	Position	Year
Second	Evan Mahaffey	Wing	5th-Sr
Second	Tahj Staveski	Guard	R-Sr

== Roster ==
2025–26 Akron Zips men's basketball team
Players
Coaches

Pos.	#	Name	Height	Weight	Year	Previous school	Hometown
G	1	Exavier Wilson	6 ft 1 in (1.85 m)	170 lb (77 kg)	RS Fr	Kansas State	Columbia, Missouri
G	2	Tahj Staveskie	6 ft 1 in (1.85 m)	185 lb (84 kg)	RS Sr	Incarnate Word	Sandusky, Ohio
F	4	Buddy Hammer Jr.	6 ft 7 in (2.01 m)	215 lb (98 kg)	Sr	North Texas	Westville, Oklahoma
F	5	Chabi Barre	6 ft 10 in (2.08 m)	225 lb (102 kg)	RS Sr	Duquesne	Cotonou, Benin
G	6	Tai Perkins	6 ft 0 in (1.83 m)	150 lb (68 kg)	RS Fr	Westerville North High School	Westerville, Ohio
G	7	Josh Henderson	6 ft 5 in (1.96 m)	170 lb (77 kg)	RS Fr	Westerville Central High School	Westerville, Ohio
G	8	Ty Pence	6 ft 6 in (1.98 m)	205 lb (93 kg)	Sr	Illinois State	St. Joseph, Illinois
G	9	Cody Head	6 ft 3 in (1.91 m)	195 lb (88 kg)	RS Jr	Arkansas State	Cleveland, Ohio
F	10	Max Burton	6 ft 10 in (2.08 m)	240 lb (109 kg)	RS Sr	Western Michigan	Williamston, Michigan
G	11	Karmin Oriol	6 ft 3 in (1.91 m)	190 lb (86 kg)		North Florida	St. Petersburg, Florida
G/F	12	Evan Mahaffey	6 ft 6 in (1.98 m)	215 lb (98 kg)		Ohio State	Cincinnati, Ohio
G	15	RJ Jones	6 ft 5 in (1.96 m)	175 lb (79 kg)	Fr	St. Ignatius	Cleveland, Ohio
F	19	Devan Christion	6 ft 9 in (2.06 m)	—	Fr	Ed W. Clark High School	Las Vegas, Nevada
G/F	21	Zach Halligan	6 ft 5 in (1.96 m)	210 lb (95 kg)	RS Jr	Walsh Jesuit High School	Uniontown, Ohio
F	22	Colin White	6 ft 6 in (1.98 m)	220 lb (100 kg)	Jr	Ohio State	Ottawa, Ohio
G/F	23	Marvin Musiime-Kamali	6 ft 6 in (1.98 m)	195 lb (88 kg)	RS Jr	Cushing Academy	Brockton, Massachusetts

Head coach

- Dustin Ford (Ohio)

Assistant coach(es)

- Jay Shunnar(Michigan)
- Devan Morrow (Ohio State)
- Joshua Jones (Eastern Kentucky)
- Todd May (Ohio)
- Jordan Amati (West Virginia)

Legend

- (C) Team captain
- (S) Suspended
- (I) Ineligible
- (W) Walk-on
- Injured
- Current redshirt

Roster
Last update: November 12, 2026

== Schedule and results ==
Date time, TV	Rank^{#}	Opponent^{#}	Result	Record	High points	High rebounds	High assists	Site (attendance) city, state
Regular season
November 2, 2026*; 8:00 p.m., ESPN+		Louisiana; MAC-SBC Challenge	W 75–65	1–0	19 – Pence	11 – Mahaffey	3 – Mahaffey	Cajundome (2,408); Lafayette, LA
November 9, 2026*; 7:00 p.m.		Muskingum	W 112–64	2–0	22 – Staveskie	10 – Hammer Jr.	5 – Mahaffey	James A. Rhodes Arena; Akron, OH
November 14, 2026*; 12:00 p.m., ESPN+		Tulane	W 65–63	3–0	17 – Pence	10 – Barre	5 – Mahaffey	James A. Rhodes Arena; Akron, OH
November 17, 2026*; 7:00 p.m., ESPN+		Bucknell	L 49–53	3–1	13 – Mahaffey	8 – Mahaffey	2 – Musiime-Kamali	Sojka Pavilion (722); Lewisburg,PA
November 20, 2026*; 6:00 p.m.		West Virginia Tech						James A. Rhodes Arena; Akron, OH
November 23, 2026*; 1:30 p.m., ESPNU		vs. Wright State; ESPN Events Invitational						State Farm Fieldhouse; Kissimmee, FL
November 24, 2026*; 12:30 p.m., ESPN2		vs. Belmont; ESPN Events Invitational						State Farm Fieldhouse; Kissimmee, FL
November 25, 2026*; 3:00 p.m., ESPNU		vs. Appalachian State; ESPN Events Invitational						State Farm Fieldhouse; Kissimmee, FL
December 2, 2026; 7:00 p.m., ESPN+		Ball State						James A. Rhodes Arena; Akron, OH
December 13, 2026*; 2:00 p.m.		Frostburg State						James A. Rhodes Arena; Akron, OH
December 16, 2026; 6:30 p.m., ESPN+		at Buffalo						Broadview Arena; Buffalo, NY
December 19, 2026; 2:00 p.m., ESPN+		Bowling Green						James A. Rhodes Arena; Akron, OH
January 29, 2026; 7:00 p.m., ESPN+		at UMass						William D. Mullins Memorial Center; Amherst, MA
January 2, 2027; 2:00 p.m., ESPN+		Western Michigan						James A. Rhodes Arena; Akron, OH
January 5, 2027; 7:00 p.m., ESPN+		at Ohio						Convocation Center; Athens, OH
January 8, 2027; 7:00 p.m., ESPN2		Miami (OH)						James A. Rhodes Arena; Akron, OH
January 12, 2027; 6:30 p.m., ESPN+		at Eastern Michigan						George Gervin GameAbove Center; Ypsilanti, MI
January 15, 2027; 8:00 p.m., CBSSN		at Toledo						Savage Arena; Toledo, OH
January 19, 2027; 7:00 p.m., ESPN+		Central Michigan						James A. Rhodes Arena; Akron, OH
January 22, 2027; 8:00 p.m., ESPNU		at Miami (OH)						Millett Hall; Oxford, OH
January 26, 2027; 7:00 p.m., ESPN+		Ohio						James A. Rhodes Arena; Akron, OH
January 30, 2027; 2:00 p.m., ESPN+		UMass						James A. Rhodes Arena; Akron, OH
February 2, 2027; 7:00 p.m., ESPN+		at Western Michigan						University Arena; Kalamazoo, MI
February 6, 2027; TBD, TBD		TBD; MAC-SBC Challenge						James A. Rhodes Arena; Akron, OH
February 9, 2027; 7:00 p.m., ESPN+		Buffalo						James A. Rhodes Arena; Akron, OH
February 13, 2027; TBD, TBD		at Kent State						MAC Center; Kent, OH
February 16, 2027; 7:00 p.m., ESPN+		at Bowling Green						Stroh Center; Bowling Green, OH
February 20, 2027; TBD, TBD		Eastern Michigan						James A. Rhodes Arena; Akron, OH
February 23, 2027; 7:00 p.m., ESPN+		Toledo						James A. Rhodes Arena; Akron, OH
March 27, 2027; TBD, TBD		at Ball State						Worthen Arena; Muncie, IN
March 2, 2027; 7:00 PM., ESPN+		at Central Michigan						McGuirk Arena; Mount Pleasant, MI
March 5, 2027; TBD, TBD		at Kent State						James A. Rhodes Arena; Akron, OH
*Non-conference game. ^{#}Rankings from AP Poll. (#) Tournament seedings in parentheses. MW=Midwest. All times are in Eastern.
