= 2026–27 UMass Minutemen basketball team =

American college basketball season

2026–27 UMass Minutemen basketball
- Conference: Mid-American Conference
- Head coach: Frank Martin (5th season)
- Associate head coach: Allen Edwards (4th season)
- Assistant coaches: Brian Steele (4th season); Matt Figger (2nd season)
- Home arena: Mullins Center

2026–27 Mid-American Conference men's basketball standings
	Conf.				Overall
Team	W		L	PCT	W		L	PCT
Miami (OH)	0	–	0	–	4	–	0	1.000
Central Michigan	0	–	0	–	4	–	1	.800
Western Michigan	0	–	0	–	4	–	1	.800
Akron	0	–	0	–	3	–	1	.750
Bowling Green	0	–	0	–	3	–	1	.750
Eastern Michigan	0	–	0	–	3	–	1	.750
Ohio	0	–	0	–	3	–	1	.750
Buffalo	0	–	0	–	2	–	2	.500
UMass	0	–	0	–	2	–	2	.500
Toledo	0	–	0	–	2	–	3	.400
Kent State	0	–	0	–	1	–	3	.250
Ball State	0	–	0	–	1	–	4	.200
† 2027 MAC tournament winner As of November 19, 2026; Rankings from AP poll

The 2026–27 UMass Minutemen basketball team represented the University of Massachusetts Amherst during the 2026–27 NCAA Division I men's basketball season. The Minutemen, led by fifth-year head coach Frank Martin, play their home games at the William D. Mullins Memorial Center in Amherst, Massachusetts as members of the Mid-American Conference.

== Previous season ==
The Minutemen finished the 2025–26 season 17–16, 7–11 in MAC play, to finish tied for 7th place. They qualified for the MAC tournament as the 8th seed where they upset previously unbeaten and 20th ranked Miami in the quarterfinals. They lost to Toledo the following day in the semifinal.

== Roster ==
2025–26 UMass Minutemen men's basketball team
Players
Coaches

Pos.	#	Name	Height	Weight	Year	Previous school	Hometown
G	0	Danny Carbuccia	5 ft 11 in (1.8 m)	178 lb (81 kg)	So	Archbishop Stepinac High School	Yonkers, NY
F/C	1	Abdullah Ahmed	6 ft 10 in (2.08 m)	220 lb (100 kg)	Jr	Westchester Knicks; BYU	Cairo, Egypt
F	2	Dwayne Wimbly Jr.	6 ft 6 in (1.98 m)	205 lb (93 kg)	So	St. Thomas Aquinas High School	Fort Lauderdale, FL
G	3	Jordan Clayton	6 ft 2 in (1.88 m)	185 lb (84 kg)	Sr	Bradford Christian; Northwestern	Medford, MA
G	5	Cam Hailey	5 ft 11 in (1.8 m)	175 lb (79 kg)	Fr	Western Reserve	Dorchester, MA
G	6	Christian Martin	6 ft 4 in (1.93 m)	196 lb (89 kg)	Fr	Wilbraham & Monson	Columbia, SC
G	9	Josh Engel (W)	6 ft 0 in (1.83 m)	170 lb (77 kg)	RS So	Ranney School	Manalapan, NJ
G	10	Junjie Wang	6 ft 9 in (2.06 m)	250 lb (113 kg)	Sr	NBA Global Academy; San Francisco	Xuzhou, China
G	11	Jayden Ndjigue	6 ft 4 in (1.93 m)	206 lb (93 kg)	Sr	The Rivers School	Ayer, MA
G	12	Noa Zemljić	6 ft 5 in (1.96 m)	214 lb (97 kg)	Fr	KK Cedevita	Zagreb, Croatia
F	13	Luka Damjanac	6 ft 10 in (2.08 m)	260 lb (118 kg)	Jr	Wilbraham & Monson Academy	Vienna, Austria
F	14	Heimir Helgason	6 ft 9 in (2.06 m)	200 lb (91 kg)	Fr	North Tampa Christian Academy	Njarðvík, Iceland
F/C	25	Dimitri Clerc	6 ft 10 in (2.08 m)	255 lb (116 kg)	Sr	Pensacola State	Lausanne, Switzerland
G	27	Rollie Castineyra (W)	6 ft 2 in (1.88 m)	195 lb (88 kg)	RS Jr	Phillips Exeter Academy (NH)	Marblehead, MA
F/C	34	Cheick Sylla	6 ft 9 in (2.06 m)	240 lb (109 kg)	Fr	Bridgton Academy	Bamako, Mali

Head coach

- Frank Martin (FIU)

Assistant coach(es)

- Allen Edwards (Kentucky)
- Brian Steele (South Carolina)
- Matt Figger (Eastern Kentucky)

Legend

- (C) Team captain
- (S) Suspended
- (I) Ineligible
- (W) Walk-on
- Injured
- Current redshirt

Roster
Last update: November 18, 2026

== Schedule and results ==
Date time, TV	Rank^{#}	Opponent^{#}	Result	Record	High points	High rebounds	High assists	Site (attendance) city, state
Exhibition
October 11, 2026*; 3:00 p.m.		Rhode Island	W 81–69		16 – Tied	6 – Tied	–	Mullins Center; Amherst, MA
October 18, 2026*; 2:00 p.m.		Brown	W 88–86		31 – Wang	7 – Clayton	3 – Wimbley Jr.	Mullins Center; Amherst, MA
October 23, 2026*; 7:00 p.m.		at Harvard	W 82–74		16 – Wang	–	–	Lavietes Pavilion; Cambridge, MA
Regular season
November 2, 2026*; 7:00 p.m., ESPN+		at Troy	W 71–60	1–0	18 – Wang	13 – Wang	8 – Carbuccia	Trojan Arena (3,899); Troy, AL
November 6, 2026*; 4:00 p.m., ESPN+		vs. Boston College; Hall of Fame Series - Boston	L 55–71	1–1	15 – Wimbley Jr.	6 – Tied	6 – Carbuccia	TD Garden (4,734); Boston, MA
November 11, 2026*; 7:00 p.m., ESPN+		UMass Lowell	W 72–62	2–1	28 – Wang	10 – Wimbley Jr.	7 – Carbuccia	Mullins Center (3,034); Amherst, MA
November 17, 2026*; 7:30 p.m., ESPN+		Bryant	L 79–83 ^{OT}	2–2	18 – Wimbley Jr.	12 – Wimbley Jr.	6 – Carbuccia	Mullins Center (2,533); Amherst, MA
*Non-conference game. ^{#}Rankings from AP Poll. (#) Tournament seedings in parentheses. All times are in Eastern.
