= 2026–27 Eastern Michigan Eagles men's basketball team =

American college basketball season

2026–27 Eastern Michigan Eagles men's basketball
- Conference: Mid-American Conference
- Record: 1–0 (0–0 MAC)
- Head coach: Billy Donlon (1st season)
- Associate head coach: Martin McGillan (1st season)
- Assistant coaches: John Bowler (1st season); Vince Fritz (1st season); Hassan Nizam (1st season)
- Home arena: George Gervin GameAbove Center

2026–27 Mid-American Conference men's basketball standings
	Conf.				Overall
Team	W		L	PCT	W		L	PCT
Akron	0	–	0	–	1	–	0	1.000
Bowling Green	0	–	0	–	1	–	0	1.000
Central Michigan	0	–	0	–	1	–	0	1.000
Eastern Michigan	0	–	0	–	1	–	0	1.000
Miami (OH)	0	–	0	–	1	–	0	1.000
Ohio	0	–	0	–	1	–	0	1.000
UMass	0	–	0	–	1	–	0	1.000
Ball State	0	–	0	–	0	–	1	.000
Buffalo	0	–	0	–	0	–	1	.000
Kent State	0	–	0	–	0	–	1	.000
Toledo	0	–	0	–	0	–	1	.000
Western Michigan	0	–	0	–	0	–	1	.000
† 2027 MAC tournament winner As of November 6, 2026; Rankings from AP poll

The 2026–27 Eastern Michigan Eagles men's basketball team will represent Eastern Michigan University during the 2026–27 NCAA Division I men's basketball season. The Eagles, led by first-year head coach Billy Donlon, will play their home games at the George Gervin GameAbove Center in Ypsilanti, Michigan as members of the Mid-American Conference (MAC).

On March 17, 2026, Donlon was hired as the teams 31st head coach.

== Previous season ==
The Eagles finished the 2025–26 season 10–21, 4–14 in MAC play, to finish tied for 11th place. They failed to qualify for the MAC tournament for the fourth time in Stan Heath's five year tenure. On March 8, 2026, Heath and Eastern Michigan mutually parted ways as his contract expired. He was 57–99 in five seasons.

== Offseason ==
=== Departures ===
Departures
Name	Number	Pos.	Height	Year	Hometown	Reason for departure
Mak Manciel	1	G	6' 4"	Senior	Detroit, MI	Graduated
Mehki Ellison	3	G	6' 0"	Senior	Flint, MI	Graduated
Aidan Rubio	7	G/F	6' 7"	RS Junior	Flint, MI	Entered transfer portal
Mbaye N'Diaye	8	G	6' 5"	RS Freshman	Thiès, Senegal	Transferred to Florida SouthWestern
Addison Patterson	9	F	6' 7"	RS Senior	Mississauga, ON	Graduated
Jon Sanders II	10	G	6' 2"	Senior	Detroit, MI	Graduated
Godslove Nwabude	13	F	6' 9"	Sophomore	Anambra State, Nigeria	Transferred to Kent State
John Shanu II	33	C	6' 11"	RS Senior	Houston, TX	Graduated
Merritt Alderink	35	F	6' 7"	Sophomore	Zeeland, MI	Transferred to Ferris State
Cooper Smith	45	G	6' 1"	Graduate	Mio, Michigan	Graduated

=== Incoming transfers ===
Incoming transfers
Name	Number	Pos.	Height	Weight	Year	Hometown	Previous school
Kaden Johnson	1	F	6' 11"	230	RS Senior	Hartford, MI	Huntington
Emanuel Richards	2	G	6' 5"	200	Senior	Irmo, SC	Longwood
Jabri Fitzpatrick	3	G	6' 2"	175	Junior	North Brunswick, NJ	New Haven
Omar Suleiman	7	F	6' 6"	200	RS Sophomore	Canton, MI	Lake Superior State
DaCory Porter	12	G	6' 4"	175	Senior	Jackson, MS	Delta State
Jordan Wright	13	F	6' 6"	225	Junior	Clinton Township, MI	Oakland CC
Kilian Brockhoff	14	F	6' 8"	240	Senior	Cuxhaven, Germany	William & Mary
Max Booher	20	G	6' 4"	190	Sophomore	Greenwood, IN	Quincy
Jaiden Martin	30	G	6' 4"	225	Junior	Milwaukee, WI	Parkland

== Roster ==
2026–27 Eastern Michigan Eagles men's basketball team
Players
Coaches

Pos.	#	Name	Height	Weight	Year	Previous school	Hometown
G	0	Gregory Lawson II	6 ft 3 in (1.91 m)	200 lb (91 kg)	So	Faith Family Academy of Oak Cliff	Saginaw, MI
F	1	Kaden Johnson	6 ft 11 in (2.11 m)	230 lb (104 kg)	RS Sr	Huntington	Hartford, MI
G	2	Emanuel Richards	6 ft 4 in (1.93 m)	200 lb (91 kg)	Sr	Longwood	Irmo, SC
G	3	Jabri Fitzpatrick	6 ft 2 in (1.88 m)	175 lb (79 kg)	Jr	New Haven	North Brunswick Township, NJ
F	4	Mohammad Habhab	6 ft 9 in (2.06 m)	220 lb (100 kg)	RS So	Central Michigan	Dearborn, MI
G	5	Braelon Green	6 ft 3 in (1.91 m)	180 lb (82 kg)	Sr	Bowling Green	Southfield, MI
F	7	Omar Suleiman	6 ft 6 in (1.98 m)	200 lb (91 kg)	RS So	Lake Superior State	Canton, MI
G	12	DaCory Porter	6 ft 4 in (1.93 m)	175 lb (79 kg)	Sr	Delta State	Jackson, MS
F	13	Jordan Wright	6 ft 6 in (1.98 m)	225 lb (102 kg)	Jr	Oakland Community College	Clinton Township, MI
F	14	Kilian Brockhoff	6 ft 8 in (2.03 m)	240 lb (109 kg)	Sr	William & Mary	Cuxhaven, Germany
G	20	Max Booher	6 ft 4 in (1.93 m)	190 lb (86 kg)	So	Quincy	Greenwood, IN
G	30	Jaiden Martin	6 ft 4 in (1.93 m)	225 lb (102 kg)	Jr	Parkland	Milwaukee, WI
G	44	Aviv Aronov	6 ft 5 in (1.96 m)	200 lb (91 kg)	Fr	Huntington Prep	Tel Aviv, Israel

Head coach

- Billy Donlon (UNC Wilmington)

Assistant coach(es)

- Martin McGillan (UNC Wilmington)
- John Bowler (Eastern Michigan)
- Vince Fritz (Missouri Southern)
- Hassan Nizam (Capella)
- Cam Carter (Cal State Fullerton)

Legend

- (C) Team captain
- (S) Suspended
- (I) Ineligible
- (W) Walk-on
- Injured
- Current redshirt

Roster
Last update: October, 2026

== Schedule and results ==
Date time, TV	Rank^{#}	Opponent^{#}	Result	Record	High points	High rebounds	High assists	Site (attendance) city, state
Exhibition
October 11, 2026*; 2:00 p.m.		at Michigan	L 62-87	–	11 – Tied	6 – Johnson	4 – Green	Crisler Center (7,123); Ann Arbor, MI
Regular season
November 2, 2026*; 7:00 p.m., ESPN+		at Coastal Carolina; MAC-SBC Challenge	W 71–70	1–0	34 – Habhab	13 – Habhab	4 – Green	HTC Center (1,886); Conway, SC
November 6, 2026*; 7:00 p.m., ESPN+		at Xavier						Cintas Center; Cincinnati, OH
November 11, 2026*; 6:30 p.m., ESPN+		Great Lakes Christian						George Gervin GameAbove Center; Ypsilanti, MI
November 18, 2026*; 6:30 p.m., ESPN+		Detroit Mercy						George Gervin GameAbove Center; Ypsilanti, MI
November 21, 2026*; 1:00 p.m., ESPN+		Denver						George Gervin GameAbove Center; Ypsilanti, MI
November 24, 2026*; 6:00 p.m.		vs. Kennesaw State; Cancún Challenge Riviera Division Semifinal						Hard Rock Hotel Riviera Maya; Cancún, Mexico
November 25, 2026*; TBA, TBA		at UTEP/Charleston; Cancún Challenge Riviera Division						Hard Rock Hotel Riviera Maya; Cancún, Mexico
December 2, 2026; 6:30 p.m., ESPN+		UMass						George Gervin GameAbove Center; Ypsilanti, MI
December 5, 2026; 1:00 p.m., ESPN+		at Ball State						Worthen Arena; Muncie, IN
December 9, 2026; TBA, ESPN+		at Toledo						Savage Arena; Toledo, OH
December 12, 2026; 2:00 p.m., ESPN+		Central Michigan						George Gervin GameAbove Center; Ypsilanti, MI
December 19, 2026*; 1:30 p.m., ACC Network		at Louisville						KFC Yum! Center; Louisville, KY
December 21, 2026*; 6:30 p.m., ESPN+		Grace Christian						George Gervin GameAbove Center; Ypsilanti, MI
January 2, 2027; TBA, ESPN+		at Miami (OH)						Millett Hall; Oxford, OH
January 5, 2027; TBA, ESPN+		at Western Michigan						University Arena; Kalamazoo, MI
January 9, 2027; 3:30 p.m., ESPN+		Bowling Green						George Gervin GameAbove Center; Ypsilanti, MI
January 12, 2027; 6:30 p.m., ESPN+		Akron						George Gervin GameAbove Center; Ypsilanti, MI
January 16, 2027; TBA, ESPN+		at Ohio						Convocation Center; Athens, OH
January 19, 2027; 6:30 p.m., ESPN+		Kent State						George Gervin GameAbove Center; Yspilanti, MI
January 23, 2027; 3:30 p.m., ESPN+		Ball State						George Gervin GameAbove Center; Ypsilanti, MI
January 26, 2027; TBA, ESPN+		at Buffalo						Broadview Arena; Amherst, NY
January 30, 2027; 2:00 p.m., ESPN+		Western Michigan						George Gervin GameAbove Center; Ypsilanti, MI
February 2, 2027; 6:30 p.m., ESPN+		Toledo						George Gervin GameAbove Center; Ypsilanti, MI
February 6, 2027*; 2:00 p.m., ESPN+		TBD; MAC-SBC Challenge						George Gervin GameAbove Center; Ypsilanti, MI
February 9, 2027; 7:00 p.m., ESPN+		at Central Michigan						McGuirk Arena; Mount Pleasant, MI
February 13, 2027; 12:30 p.m., ESPN+		at UMass						Mullins Center; Amherst, MA
February 16, 2027; 6:30 p.m., ESPN+		Ohio						George Gervin GameAbove Center; Ypsilanti, MI
February 20, 2027; TBA, ESPN+		at Akron						James A. Rhodes Arena; Akron, OH
February 23, 2027; 6:30 p.m, ESPN+		Miami (OH)						George Gervin GameAbove Center; Ypsilanti, MI
February 27, 2027; 3:30 p.m., ESPN+		Buffalo						George Gervin GameAbove Center; Ypsilanti, MI
March 2, 2027; TBA, ESPN+		at Kent State						Memorial Athletic and Convocation Center; Kent, OH
March 5, 2027; TBA, ESPN+		at Bowling Green						Stroh Center; Bowling Green, OH
MAC Tournament
March 10-13, 2027†; TBA, ESPN		vs. TBA; Quarterfinals						Rocket Arena; Cleveland, OH
*Non-conference game. ^{#}Rankings from AP Poll. (#) Tournament seedings in parentheses. All times are in Eastern Time.
