= 2026–27 Miami RedHawks men's basketball team =

American college basketball season

2026–27 Miami RedHawks men's basketball
- Conference: Mid-American Conference
- Record: 5–0 (0–0 MAC)
- Head coach: Travis Steele (5th season)
- Associate head coach: Khristian Smith (5th season)
- Assistant coaches: Ben Botts (2nd season); Andrew Dakich (1st season); Carl Richburg (3rd season); Elijah Pennington (3rd season)
- Home arena: Millett Hall

2026–27 Mid-American Conference men's basketball standings
	Conf.				Overall
Team	W		L	PCT	W		L	PCT
Miami (OH)	0	–	0	–	4	–	0	1.000
Western Michigan	0	–	0	–	5	–	1	.833
Akron	0	–	0	–	4	–	1	.800
Eastern Michigan	0	–	0	–	4	–	1	.800
Ohio	0	–	0	–	3	–	1	.750
Central Michigan	0	–	0	–	4	–	2	.667
Bowling Green	0	–	0	–	3	–	2	.600
UMass	0	–	0	–	3	–	2	.600
Toledo	0	–	0	–	3	–	3	.500
Buffalo	0	–	0	–	2	–	3	.400
Kent State	0	–	0	–	2	–	3	.400
Ball State	0	–	0	–	1	–	4	.200
† 2027 MAC tournament winner As of November 22, 2026; Rankings from AP poll

The 2026–27 Miami RedHawks men's basketball team represents Miami University during the 2026–27 NCAA Division I men's basketball season. The RedHawks, led by fifth-year head coach Travis Steele, play their home games at Millett Hall in Oxford, Ohio as members of the Mid-American Conference (MAC).

== Previous Season ==
The RedHawks finished the 2025-26 season 32–2, 18–0 in MAC play to finish in first place. Miami won every game in the regular season to become the first MAC team to win all of its conference games in the regular season. The team concluded the season with active school record streaks for consecutive home wins (31) and consecutive road wins (15). During the season, it established a school record for consecutive weeks ranked (7) and set MAC record for consecutive MAC game wins (18 going into the tournament). Having only tournament game losses they concluded the season with an active 33-game consecutive regular season games win streak and a 20-game consecutive MAC regular season game win streak. The team also set a record for most wins by three points or fewer by an undefeated team (8). The team's 32 wins established a single-season school record by surpassing the prior season's total of 25. The 20th ranked RedHawks were eliminated in the quarterfinals of the MAC tournament to UMass, marking their first loss of the season. As a result, they were no longer ranked and only receiving votes in both polls. Despite the MAC tourney loss, they earned an at-large bid to the NCAA tournament. Miami's bid was the MAC conference's first at large bid since the Wally Szczerbiak-led 1998–99 Miami RedHawks team and the school's first invitation since the 2006–07 Miami RedHawks. They advanced to the round of 64 with a First Four win (the team's 32nd of the season) over SMU before falling in the first round to 23rd-ranked Tennessee. 32 wins equalled the 2018–19 Buffalo Bulls who had set the MAC conference single-season record in 2019. The First Four win was the school's first NCAA tournament win since the 1998–99 team's success at the 1999 NCAA tournament.

== Offseason ==
=== Departures ===
Departures
Name	Number	Pos.	Height	Weight	Year	Hometown	Reason for departure
Eian Elmer	0	G/F	6'6"	215	Junior	Cincinnati, Ohio	Transferred to Wisconsin
Trey Perry	1	G	6'2"	185	Freshman	Liberty Township, Ohio	Transferred to Coastal Carolina
Brady Ganley	4	G	6'3"	180	Freshman	Brecksville, Ohio	
Peter Suder	5	G	6'5"	215	Senior	Carmel, Indiana	Exhausted eligibility
Jack Sauer	6	G	6'2"	180	Freshman	Loveland, Ohio	
Eli Yofan	8	G	6'2"	205	Senior	Pittsburgh, Pennsylvania	
Brant Byers	22	G/F	6'8"	200	Sophomore	Chambersburg, Pennsylvania	Transferred to Penn State
Blake Anderson	33	G	6'4"	205	Junior	Evansville, Indiana	

=== Incoming transfers ===
Incoming transfers
Name	Number	Pos.	Height	Weight	Year	Hometown	Previous school
Preston Copeland	5	F	6'9"	215	Sophomore	Clayton, North Carolina	Ball State
Stevie Elam	8	G	6'3"	210	Sophomore	Adrian, Michigan	Milwaukee
Rich Rolf	9	F	6'7"	220	Redshirt senior	Centerville, Ohio	Youngstown State

=== Recruiting class ===
College recruiting
Name	Hometown	School	Height	Weight	Commit date
Alan Horton; F/C	Toledo, Ohio	St. Francis de Sales School	6 ft 9 in (2.06 m)	240 lb (110 kg)	
Alan Horton; F/C	Recruit ratings: Rivals: 247Sports: ESPN: (N/A)				
Anthony Fresh; G	Jeffersonville, Indiana	Charlestown	6 ft 4 in (1.93 m)	180 lb (82 kg)	
Anthony Fresh; G	Recruit ratings: Rivals: 247Sports: ESPN: (N/A)				
Danny Kelly; F	Cincinnati, Ohio	Archbishop Moeller High School	6 ft 5 in (1.96 m)	210 lb (95 kg)	
Danny Kelly; F	Recruit ratings: Rivals: 247Sports: ESPN: (N/A)				
Overall recruit ranking:
Note: In many cases, Scout, Rivals, 247Sports, On3, and ESPN may conflict in their listings of height and weight.; In these cases, the average was taken. ESPN grades are on a 100-point scale.; Sources: "2026 Team Ranking". Rivals.

== Preseason ==
On October 20, 2026, the MAC released the preseason coaches poll. Miami was picked to finish first in the MAC regular season. Of 12 prediction votes (one from each school) Miami received nine first place votes for the conference standings and five votes to win the MAC Tournament. Guards Evan Ipsaro (senior) and Luke Skaljac (junior) were both voted to the preseason all-MAC first team. The team also began the season ranked first in the Collegeinsider Preseason Mid-Major Top 25® Poll with 18 of 31 first place votes. Miami began its home schedule vying with Akron for the 2nd longest home winning streak in the nation behind Duke.

=== Preseason rankings ===
MAC preseason poll
Predicted finish	Team	Votes (1st place)	1st place
1.	Miami	130	9
2.	Toledo	117	2
3.	Akron	110	--
4.	Kent State	108	1
5.	Ohio	82	--
6.	UMass	79	--
7.	Bowling Green	63	--
8.	Western Michigan	58	--
9.	Eastern Michigan	56	--
10.	Buffalo	47	--
11.	Ball State	40	--
12.	Central Michigan	25	--

MAC Tournament Champions: Miami (5), Toledo (2), UMass (2), Kent State (1)

=== Preseason All-MAC ===
Preseason All-MAC teams
Team	Player	Position	Year
1st	Evan Ipsaro	G	Sr.
1st	Luke Skaljac	G	Jr.

== Roster ==
2026–27 Miami RedHawks men's basketball team
Players
Coaches

Pos.	#	Name	Height	Weight	Year	Previous school	Hometown
F/C	00	Alan Horton	6 ft 9 in (2.06 m)	240 lb (109 kg)	Fr	St. Francis de Sales School	Toledo, Ohio
G	1	Anthony Fresh	6 ft 4 in (1.93 m)	180 lb (82 kg)	Fr	Charlestown	Jeffersonville, Indiana
G	2	Evan Ipsaro	6 ft 0 in (1.83 m)	185 lb (84 kg)	Sr	Covington Catholic High School	Cincinnati
G	3	Luke Skaljac	6 ft 2 in (1.88 m)	190 lb (86 kg)	Jr	Brecksville-Broadview Heights High School	Brecksville, Ohio
F	5	Preston Copeland	6 ft 9 in (2.06 m)	215 lb (98 kg)	So	Clayton High School	Clayton, North Carolina
G	6	Justin Kirby	6 ft 4 in (1.93 m)	190 lb (86 kg)	So	Fishers High School	Fishers, Indiana
F	7	Ethan Wright	6 ft 6 in (1.98 m)	190 lb (86 kg)	Sr	Spring Valley Academy	Philadelphia
G	8	Stevie Elam	6 ft 3 in (1.91 m)	210 lb (95 kg)	So	Adrian High School	Adrian, Michigan
F	9	Rich Rolf	6 ft 7 in (2.01 m)	220 lb (100 kg)	RS Sr	Centerville High School	Centerville, Ohio
F	11	Almar Atlason	6 ft 8 in (2.03 m)	230 lb (104 kg)	Sr	Sunrise Christian Academy	Reykjavík, Iceland
F	13	Antwone Woolfolk	6 ft 9 in (2.06 m)	250 lb (113 kg)		Charles F. Brush High School	Cleveland
F	20	Tyler Robbins	6 ft 10 in (2.08 m)	250 lb (113 kg)	So	Upper St. Clair	Pittsburgh
G	21	Leshawn Stowers	6 ft 5 in (1.96 m)	195 lb (88 kg)	RS Fr	Peoria Central	Peoria, Illinois
F	24	Jackson Kotecki	6 ft 9 in (2.06 m)	225 lb (102 kg)	Sr	St. Ignatius College Prep	Chicago
F	25	Kyle Waltz	6 ft 7 in (2.01 m)	220 lb (100 kg)	So	York Community High School	Elmhurst, Illinois
F	35	Danny Kelly	6 ft 5 in (1.96 m)	210 lb (95 kg)	Fr	Archbishop Moeller High School	Cincinnati

Head coach

- Travis Steele (Butler)

Assistant coach(es)

- Khristian Smith (Indiana State)
- Ben Botts (Purdue Fort Wayne)
- Carl Richburg (Miami (OH))
- Elijah Pennington (IUPUI)
- Andrew Dakich ((Michigan))

Legend

- (C) Team captain
- (S) Suspended
- (I) Ineligible
- (W) Walk-on
- Injured
- Current redshirt

Roster
Last update: 10 November 2025

== Schedule and results ==
Duke lost to Illinois on November 17, ending the nation's longest Division I streak at 35 games. This meant that Miami's November 18 home victory over Defiance tied them with Akron for the nation's longest win streak at 33.

Date time, TV	Rank^{#}	Opponent^{#}	Result	Record	High points	High rebounds	High assists	Site (attendance) city, state
Preseason
October 26, 2026*; 7:00 p.m.		IU East; Banner Ceremony	W 86–56		–	–	–	Millett Hall; Oxford, OH
Regular season
November 2, 2026*; 7:00 p.m., ESPN+		James Madison; MAC-SBC Challenge	W 86–77	1–0	19 – Skaljac	10 – Woolfolk	6 – Tied	Atlantic Union Bank Center (4,071); Harrisonburg, VA
November 7, 2026*; 5:00 p.m., ESPN+		Bellarmine	W 80–73	2–0	15 – Tied	7 – Waltz	5 – Ipsaro	Millett Hall (4,342); Oxford, Ohio
November 14, 2026*; 2:00 p.m., ESPN+		Evansville	W 86–78	3–0	19 – Waltz	7 – Elam	9 – Skaljac	Ford Center (2,652); Evansville, IN
November 18, 2026*; 7:00 p.m., ESPN+		Defiance	W 91–69	4–0	16 – Elam	9 – Waltz	11 – Skaljac	Millett Hall (3,029); Oxford, Ohio
November 22, 2026*; 12:00 p.m.		vs. UIC; Jacksonville Classic	W 71–60	5–0	18 – Elam	6 – Copeland	6 – Ipsaro	The Reef (123); Jacksonville, FL
November 25, 2026*; 1:00 p.m., ESPN+		Eastern Kentucky						Millett Hall; Oxford, Ohio
December 2, 2026*; 7:00 p.m., ESPN+		Central Michigan						Millett Hall; Oxford, Ohio
December 5, 2026; 2:00 p.m., ESPN+		Buffalo						Broadview Arena; Buffalo, NY
December 12, 2026*; 1:00 p.m.		High Point; Riley Decker Showcase						Novant Health Fieldhouse; Greensboro, NC
December 16, 2026; 7:00 p.m., ESPN+		Bowling Green						Stroh Center; Bowling Green, OH
December 19, 2026; 1:00 p.m., ESPN+		Ball State						Millett Hall; Oxford, Ohio
December 22, 2026*; 7:00 p.m., ESPN+		Wright State						Millett Hall; Oxford, Ohio
December 29, 2026*; 7:00 p.m., ESPN+		Union Commonwealth						Millett Hall; Oxford, Ohio
January 2, 2027; 2:00 p.m.		Eastern Michigan						Millett Hall; Oxford, Ohio
January 5, 2027; 7:00 p.m.		Toledo						Savage Arena; Toledo, OH
January 8, 2027; 7:00 p.m.		Akron						James A. Rhodes Arena; Akron, OH
January 12, 2027; 7:00 p.m.		Western Michigan						Millett Hall; Oxford, Ohio
January 16, 2027; 6:00 p.m.		Kent State						Memorial Athletic and Convocation Center; Kent, OH
January 19, 2027; 7:00 p.m.		Buffalo						Millett Hall; Oxford, Ohio
January 22, 2027; 8:00 p.m.		Akron						Millett Hall; Oxford, Ohio
January 26, 2027; 6:00 p.m.		UMass						Mullins Center; Amherst, MA
January 29, 2027; 7:00 p.m.		Ohio						Convocation Center; Athens, OH
February 2, 2027; 7:00 p.m.		Kent State						Millett Hall; Oxford, Ohio
February 6, 2027*; 1:00 p.m.		Sun Belt (TBD); MAC-SBC Challenge						Millett Hall; Oxford, Ohio
February 9, 2027; 7:00 p.m.		Bowling Green						Millett Hall; Oxford, Ohio
February 13, 2027; 1:30 p.m.		Ball State						Worthen Arena; Muncie, IN
February 16, 2027; 7:00 p.m.		Toledo						Millett Hall; Oxford, Ohio
February 20, 2027; 7:00 p.m.		Central Michigan						McGuirk Arena; Mount Pleasant, MI
February 23, 2027; 6:30 p.m.		Eastern Michigan						George Gervin GameAbove Center; Ypsilanti, MI
February 27, 2027; 3:30 p.m.		Ohio						Millett Hall; Oxford, Ohio
March 2, 2027; 7:00 p.m.		Western Michigan						University Arena; Kalamazoo, MI
March 5, 2027; 7:00 p.m.		Massachusetts						Millett Hall; Oxford, Ohio
MAC tournament
March 10, 2027; TBD		MAC tournament						Rocket Arena; Cleveland, OH
March 11, 2027; TBD		MAC tournament						Rocket Arena; Cleveland, Ohio
March 12, 2027; TBD		MAC tournament						Rocket Arena; Cleveland, Ohio
March 13, 2027; TBD		MAC tournament						Rocket Arena; Cleveland, Ohio
*Non-conference game. ^{#}Rankings from AP Poll. (#) Tournament seedings in parentheses. All times are in Eastern Time Zone.

== Rankings ==
Ranking movements Legend: — = Not ranked
	Week																				
Poll	Pre	1	2	3	4	5	6	7	8	9	10	11	12	13	14	15	16	17	18	19	Final
AP	—	—																			
Coaches	—	—																			

== See also ==
2026–27 Miami RedHawks women's basketball team
