= 2026–27 Ohio Bobcats men's basketball team =

American college basketball season

2026–27 Ohio Bobcats men's basketball
- Conference: Mid-American Conference
- Record: 3–1 (– MAC)
- Head coach: Jeff Boals (8th season)
- Assistant coaches: Lamar Thornton (8th season); Kyle Barlow (8th season); Lee Martin (7th season); Casey Crawford (2nd season)
- Home arena: Convocation Center

2026–27 Mid-American Conference men's basketball standings
	Conf.				Overall
Team	W		L	PCT	W		L	PCT
Miami (OH)	0	–	0	–	4	–	0	1.000
Central Michigan	0	–	0	–	4	–	1	.800
Western Michigan	0	–	0	–	4	–	1	.800
Akron	0	–	0	–	3	–	1	.750
Bowling Green	0	–	0	–	3	–	1	.750
Eastern Michigan	0	–	0	–	3	–	1	.750
Ohio	0	–	0	–	3	–	1	.750
Buffalo	0	–	0	–	2	–	2	.500
UMass	0	–	0	–	2	–	2	.500
Toledo	0	–	0	–	2	–	3	.400
Kent State	0	–	0	–	1	–	3	.250
Ball State	0	–	0	–	1	–	4	.200
† 2027 MAC tournament winner As of November 19, 2026; Rankings from AP poll

The 2026–27 Ohio University Bobcats men's basketball team will represent Ohio University for the 2026–27 NCAA Division I men's basketball season. The Bobcats will be led by eighth-year head coach Jeff Boals, who was a 1995 graduate of Ohio University. They will play their home games at the Convocation Center in Athens, Ohio, as a member of the Mid-American Conference.

== Previous season ==
The Bobcats were picked to finish fourth the conference but finished with a 15–17 record. They began with a 1–6 record entering through Thanksgiving and could not recover as the program suffered its first losing season under Boals. They finished tied for fifth in the MAC with a 9–9 conference record. They lost in the first round of the MAC tournament for the second straight season.

== Offseason ==
=== Departures ===
Departures
Name	Number	Pos.	Height	Weight	Year	Hometown	Reason
Elijah Elliot	6	SG	6'4"	192	Sophomore	Orlando, Florida	Transferred to North Florida.
Ayden Evans	5	PF	6'8"	205	Sophomore	Radcliff, Kentucky	Transferred to Maine.
Jordan Fisher	24	SF	6'5"	185	Freshman	Reynoldsburg, Ohio	Transferred to Central State
Aidan Hadaway	10	SF	6'8"	190	Senior	Lafayette, Georgia	Transferred to Green Bay
Dior Conners	3	G	6'3"	183	Senior	Columbus, Ohio	Exhausted Eligibility
Ajay Sheldon	0	G	6'1"	190	Senior	Dublin, Ohio	Exhausted Eligibility
Jalen Breath	22	PG	6'8"	185	Senior	Oklahoma City, Oklahoma	Exhausted Eligibility
JJ Kelly	4	G	6'9"	195	Freshman	Chambersburg, Pennsylvania	Transferred to UTSA.
Chase Boals*	15	F	6'5"	253	Freshman	New Albany, Ohio	Retired

* Walk-on in 2025–26

=== Incoming transfers ===
Incoming Transfers
Name	Number	Pos.	Height	Weight	Year	Hometown	Reason
Kolton Mitchell	14	PG	6'1"	150	Sophomore	Coeur d'Alene, Idaho	Transferred from Idaho. Will have two years of eligibility remaining.
Kyler D'Augustino	12	PG	6'2"	185	Junior	Albany, Ohio	Transferred from IU Indy. Will have one year of eligibility remaining.
Moek Icke	8	C	7'1"	223	Sophomore	Purmerend, Netherlands	Transferred from Rhode Island. Will have three years of eligibility remaining.

=== Recruiting class ===
College recruiting
Name	Hometown	School	Height	Weight	Commit date
Ché Brogan; SF	Melbourne, Australia	Mater Dei	6 ft 5 in (1.96 m)	170 lb (77 kg)	
Ché Brogan; SF	Recruit ratings: No ratings found				
Dusan Makitan; PF	Banja Luka, Bosnia and Herzegovina		6 ft 9 in (2.06 m)	N/A	
Dusan Makitan; PF	Recruit ratings: No ratings found				
Jorden Bowens; SF	Reynoldsburg, Ohio	Reynoldsburg High School	6 ft 6 in (1.98 m)	190 lb (86 kg)	
Jorden Bowens; SF	Recruit ratings: No ratings found				
Xavier McKinney; SG	Reynoldsburg, Ohio	Reynoldsburg High School	6 ft 4 in (1.93 m)	170 lb (77 kg)	
Xavier McKinney; SG	Recruit ratings: No ratings found				
Siebe Ledegen; SF	Aalst, Belgium		6 ft 6 in (1.98 m)	N/A	
Siebe Ledegen; SF	Recruit ratings: No ratings found				
Marin Petkov; PG	Skopje, North Macedonia		6 ft 4 in (1.93 m)	N/A	
Marin Petkov; PG	Recruit ratings: No ratings found				
Overall recruit ranking:
Note: In many cases, Scout, Rivals, 247Sports, On3, and ESPN may conflict in their listings of height and weight.; In these cases, the average was taken. ESPN grades are on a 100-point scale.; Sources: "2026 Team Ranking". Rivals.

== Preseason ==
On October 20, 2026 the MAC released the preseason coaches poll. Ohio was picked to finish fifth in the MAC regular season. Ohio received zero first place votes and zero votes to win the MAC Tournament.

=== Preseason rankings ===
MAC preseason poll
Predicted finish	Team	Votes (1st place)	1st place
1.	Miami	133	9
2.	Toledo	117	2
3.	Akron	110	--
4.	Kent State	108	1
5.	Ohio	82	--
6.	UMass	79	--
7.	Bowling Green	63	--
8.	Western Michigan	58	--
9.	Eastern Michigan	56	--
10.	Buffalo	47	--
11.	Ball State	40	--
12.	Central Michigan	25	--

MAC Tournament Champions: Miami (5), Toledo (2), UMass (2), Kent State (1)

=== Preseason All-MAC ===
Preseason All-MAC teams
Team	Player	Position	Year
2nd	Jackson Paveletzke	G	5th-Sr.

== Roster ==
2026–27 Ohio Bobcats men's basketball team
Players
Coaches

Pos.	#	Name	Height	Weight	Year	Previous school	Hometown
F	0	Christian Trudic	6 ft 5 in (1.96 m)	194 lb (88 kg)	Fr	Run The Show Prep	Chagrin Falls, OH
F	1	Javon Simmons	6 ft 7 in (2.01 m)	259 lb (117 kg)	RS Sr	Gahanna Lincoln; Toledo	Gahanna, OH
F	2	Jordie Bowens	6 ft 6 in (1.98 m)	197 lb (89 kg)	Fr	Reynoldsburg	Reynoldsburg, OH
G	3	Jackson Paveletzke	6 ft 2 in (1.88 m)	184 lb (83 kg)		Kimberly; Iowa State	Kimberly, WI
G	4	Ché Brogan	6 ft 5 in (1.96 m)	190 lb (86 kg)	Fr	Centre of Excellence	Melbourne, Australia
F	5	Zay Mosley	6 ft 7 in (2.01 m)	228 lb (103 kg)	So	Oak Ridge	Pemberton, NJ
C	8	Moek Icke	7 ft 1 in (2.16 m)	244 lb (111 kg)	RS So	Rhode Island	Purmerend, Netherlands
G	10	Siebe Ledegen	6 ft 7 in (2.01 m)	198 lb (90 kg)	GS	Okapi Aalst	Aalst, Belgium
G	11	Carter Reese (W)	6 ft 3 in (1.91 m)	212 lb (96 kg)	Sr	Westerville North; Ohio Northern	Westerville, OH
G	12	Kyler D'Augustino	6 ft 1 in (1.85 m)	207 lb (94 kg)	Sr	Alexander; IU Indy	Albany, OH
F	13	Dusan Makitan	6 ft 8 in (2.03 m)	219 lb (99 kg)	Fr	Ikogea	Banja Luka, Bosnia & Herzegovina
G	14	Kolton Mitchell	6 ft 1 in (1.85 m)	163 lb (74 kg)	RS Jr	Lake City; Idaho	Coeur d'Alene, ID
F	17	Kiir Kuany	6 ft 9 in (2.06 m)	197 lb (89 kg)	RS Sr	Huntington Prep	Melbourne, Australia
G	21	Jessie Burris	6 ft 5 in (1.96 m)	185 lb (84 kg)	RS Sr	Delaware Hayes	Delaware, OH
G	24	Marin Petkov	6 ft 4 in (1.93 m)	188 lb (85 kg)	GS	MZT Skopje	Skopje, North Macedonia

Head coach

- Jeff Boals (Ohio)

Assistant coach(es)

- Lamar Thornton (Ohio Dominican)
- Kyle Barlow (Concordia–Ann Arbor)
- Lee Martin (Catawba)
- Casey Crawford (Ohio)

Legend

- (C) Team captain
- (S) Suspended
- (I) Ineligible
- (W) Walk-on
- Injured
- Current redshirt

Roster
Last update: October 14, 2026

=== Support staff ===
2026-27 Ohio Bobcats support staff
- Jake Ness – Director of Basketball Operations
- Makale Foreman - Graduate Assistant
- Sara Legarsky – Senior Director of Athletics Communications
- Kieran Murphy – Head Student Manager
- Jessica Arquette – Ohio Athletics Sports Dietitian

== Schedule and results ==
Date time, TV	Rank^{#}	Opponent^{#}	Result	Record	High points	High rebounds	High assists	Site (attendance) city, state
Regular season
November 2, 2026*; 8:00 p.m., ESPN+		at South Alabama; MAC-SBC Challenge	W 86–77	1–0	21 – Mitchell	11 – Makitan	7 – Paveletzke	Mitchell Center (1537); Mobile, AL
November 7, 2026*; 1:00 p.m., ESPN+		North Carolina A&T	W 80–70	2–0	18 – Simmons	13 – Makitan	6 – Paveletzke	Convocation Center (5,123); Athens, OH
November 13, 2026*; 7:00 p.m., B1G+		at Purdue	L 62–80	2–1	16 – Paveletzke	8 – Makitan	3 – Paveletzke	Mackey Arena (14,876); West Lafayette, IN
November 18, 2026*; 7:00 p.m., ESPN+		Morehead State	W 91–77	3–1	24 – Paveletzke	9 – Simmons	8 – Paveletzke	Convocation Center (2,023); Athens, OH
November 24, 2026*; 11:00 a.m., TBA		vs. New Mexico State; Jacksonville Classic						The Reef; Jacksonville, FL
November 25, 2026*; 11:00 a.m., TBA		vs. Rice; Jacksonville Classic						The Reef; Jacksonville, FL
December 2, 2026; 7:00 p.m., ESPN+		Toledo						Convocation Center; Athens, OH
December 5, 2026; 3:00 p.m., ESPN+		at Central Michigan						McGuirk Arena; Mount Pleasant, MI
December 13, 2026*; 4:00 p.m., ESPN+		Kent State Tuscarawas						Convocation Center; Athens, OH
December 16, 2026; 7:00 p.m., ESPN+		at Ball State						Worthen Arena; Muncie, IN
December 19, 2026; 2:00 p.m., ESPN+		Buffalo						Convocation Center; Athens, OH
December 23, 2026*; 3:00 p.m., ESPN+		at Robert Morris						UPMC Events Center; Moon Township, PA
December 29, 2026*; 3:00 p.m., ESPN+		Bryant & Stratton						Convocation Center; Athens, OH
January 2, 2027; 2:00 p.m., TBA		at Bowling Green						Stroh Center; Bowling Green, OH
January 5, 2027; 7:00 p.m., ESPN+		Akron						Convocation Center; Athens, OH
January 9, 2027; 2:00 p.m., ESPN+		UMass						Convocation Center; Athens, OH
January 12, 2027; 7:00 p.m., TBA		at Kent State						MAC Center; Kent, OH
January 16, 2027; 2:00 p.m., ESPN+		Eastern Michigan						Convocation Center; Athens, OH
January 19, 2027; 7:00 p.m., ESPN+		Western Michigan						Convocation Center; Athens, OH
January 23, 2027; 12:00 p.m., TBA		at UMass						Mullins Center; Amherst, MA
January 26, 2027; 7:00 p.m., TBA		at Akron						James A. Rhodes Arena; Akron, OH
January 29, 2027; 7:00 p.m., CBSSN		Miami (OH)						Convocation Center; Athens, OH
February 2, 2027; 6:30 p.m., TBA		at Buffalo						Alumni Arena; Amherst, NY
February 6, 2027*; 2:00 p.m., ESPN+		TBA; MAC-SBC Challenge						Convocation Center; Athens, OH
February 9, 2027; 7:00 p.m., TBA		at Western Michigan						University Arena; Kalamazoo, MI
February 13, 2027; 2:00 p.m., ESPN+		Central Michigan						Convocation Center; Athens, OH
February 16, 2027; 6:30 p.m., TBA		at Eastern Michigan						George Gervin GameAbove Center; Ypsilanti, MI
February 20, 2027; 4:00 p.m., ESPN+		Ball State						Convocation Center; Athens, OH
February 23, 2027; 7:00 p.m., ESPN+		Kent State						Convocation Center; Athens, OH
February 27, 2027; 3:30 p.m., TBA		at Miami (OH)						Millett Hall; Oxford, OH
March 2, 2027; 7:00 p.m., ESPN+		Bowling Green						Convocation Center; Athens, OH
March 5, 2027; 7:00 p.m., TBA		at Toledo						Savage Arena; Toledo, OH
MAC Tournament
March 11, 2026†; TBA, ESPN+		vs. TBA; Quarterfinals						Rocket Arena; Cleveland, OH
*Non-conference game. ^{#}Rankings from AP Poll. (#) Tournament seedings in parentheses. All times are in Eastern Time.

† If a top eight finisher in MAC
