= 2027 MAC men's basketball tournament =

Basketball tournament

- Classification: Division I
- Season: 2026–27
- Teams: 8
- Site: Rocket Arena; Cleveland, Ohio
- MAC men's basketball tournaments

2026–27 Mid-American Conference men's basketball standings
	Conf.				Overall
Team	W		L	PCT	W		L	PCT
Akron	0	–	0	–	0	–	0	–
Ball State	0	–	0	–	0	–	0	–
Bowling Green	0	–	0	–	0	–	0	–
Buffalo	0	–	0	–	0	–	0	–
Central Michigan	0	–	0	–	0	–	0	–
Eastern Michigan	0	–	0	–	0	–	0	–
Kent State	0	–	0	–	0	–	0	–
Miami (OH)	0	–	0	–	0	–	0	–
Ohio	0	–	0	–	0	–	0	–
Toledo	0	–	0	–	0	–	0	–
UMass	0	–	0	–	0	–	0	–
Western Michigan	0	–	0	–	0	–	0	–
† 2027 MAC tournament winner

The 2027 Mid-American Conference men's basketball tournament will be the postseason men's basketball tournament for the Mid-American Conference (MAC) held March 11–13, 2027. The entire tournament will be played at Rocket Arena in Cleveland, Ohio.

== Format ==
As with all MAC tournaments since 2021, only the top eight teams will qualify. However, under a new format this year, the #1 and #2 seeds in both tournaments will receive byes into the semifinals, while the $3 and #4 seeds will receive byes into the quarterfinals. The winner of the tournament will receive the MAC's automatic bid to the 2027 NCAA tournament.

== Venue ==
The 2027 MAC tournament will be held at Rocket Arena for the 28th consecutive season. The venue, located in downtown Cleveland at One Center Court, is the home of the Cleveland Cavaliers of the National Basketball Association (NBA) and has a seating capacity for basketball of 19,432.

== Seeds ==
Eight out of the twelve MAC teams will qualify for the tournament. Teams will be seeded by record within the conference, with a tiebreaker system to seed teams with identical conference records.

Seed	School	Conference record	Tiebreaker
1			
2			
3			
4			
5			
6			
7			
8			
DNQ			
DNQ			
DNQ			
DNQ			

== Schedule ==
Session	Game	Time*	Matchup	Score	Attendance	Television
Quarterfinals – Wednesday, March 10 – Rocket Arena, Cleveland, OH
1	1	TBA				
1	2	TBA				
Semifinals – Thursday, March 11 – Rocket Arena, Cleveland, OH
2	3	TBA				
2	4	TBA				
Semifinals – Friday, March 12 – Rocket Arena, Cleveland, OH
3	5	TBA				
3	6	TBA				
Championship – Saturday, March 13 – Rocket Arena, Cleveland, OH
4	7	TBA				
*Game times in EDT. ()-Rankings denote tournament seeding.

== Bracket ==
First Round; Wednesday, March 10, 2027
5
8
6
7

Quarterfinals; Thursday, March 11, 2027
4
3

Semifinals; Friday, March 12, 2027
1
2

Championship; Saturday, March 13, 2027

== See also ==
- 2027 MAC women's basketball tournament
