= Dustin Ford =

American basketball player and coach

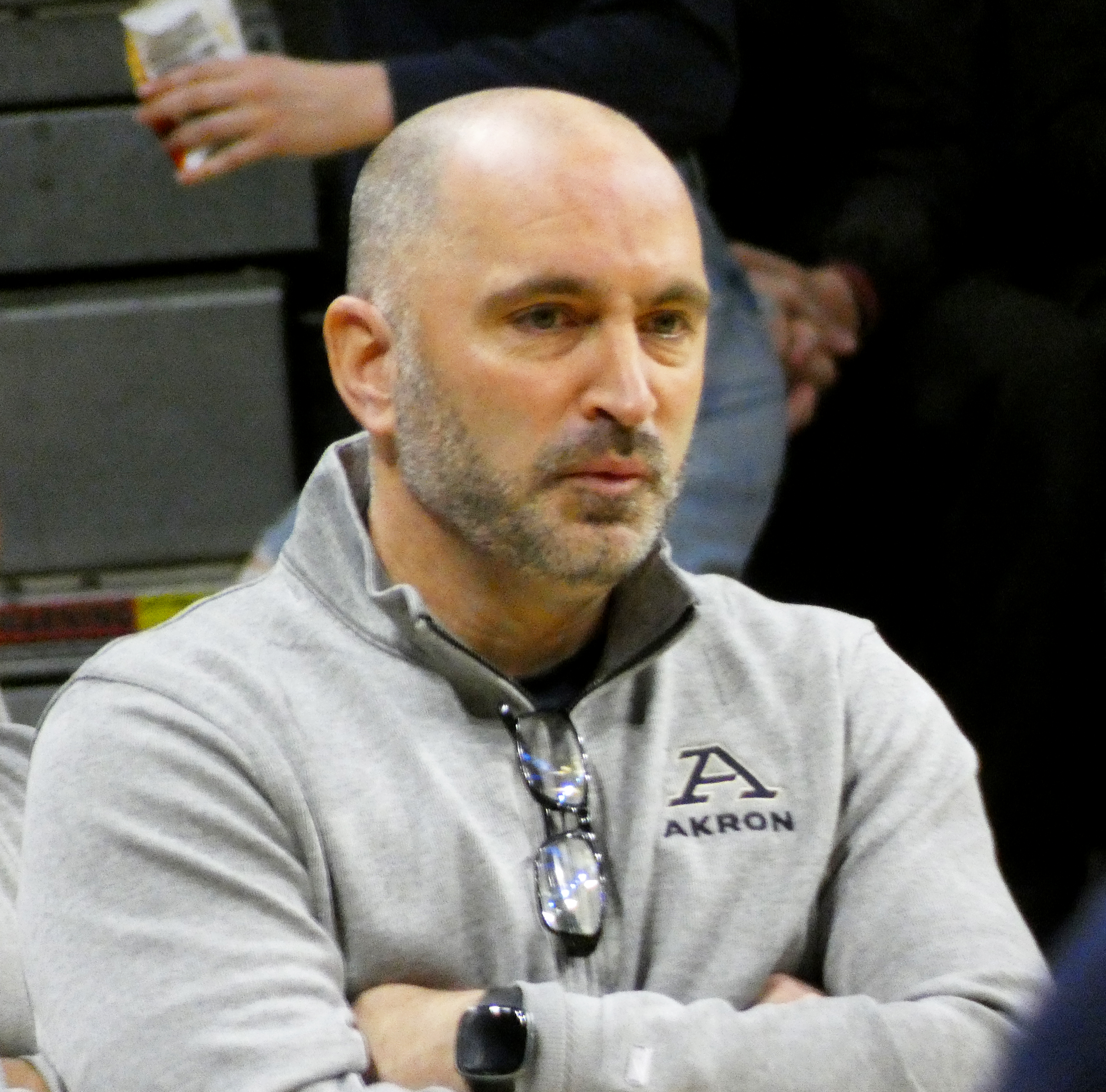
- Ford with Akron in 2024

Current position
- Title: Head coach
- Team: Akron
- Conference: MAC
- Record: 2–0 (1.000)

Biographical details
- Born: June 11, 1978 (age 48); Cambridge, Ohio, U.S.
- Education: Ohio University (2001)

Playing career
- 1998–2001: Ohio
- Position: Point guard

Coaching career (HC unless noted)
- 2002–2005: Jackson HS
- 2006–2008: Western Carolina (assistant)
- 2008–2009: Western Carolina (associate HC)
- 2009–2012: Ohio (assistant)
- 2013–2017: Illinois (assistant)
- 2017–2026: Akron (associate HC)
- 2026–present: Akron

Head coaching record
- Overall: 2–0 (1.000)

Accomplishments and honors

Championships
- 6× MAC tournament championship (2010, 2012, 2022, 2024, 2025, 2026)

Dustin Ford (born June 11, 1978) is an American basketball coach who is the head men's basketball coach at the University of Akron. Prior to being promoted to head coach, he served as an assistant coach at the University of Illinois, Ohio University and Western Carolina University. Ford's older brother, Geno, is currently the head coach at Stony Brook in Stony Brook, New York and his father, Gene, was a longtime high school head coach in Ohio and the head coach at NCAA Division III Muskingum University in New Concord, Ohio.

== Playing career ==
After graduating from Cambridge High School in Cambridge, Ohio, Ford attended Ohio University in Athens, Ohio where he earned his Bachelor of Science degree in communication studies in 2001.

At Ohio, Ford was a four-year letter winner as a point guard for the Bobcats under head coach Larry Hunter. During his junior and senior seasons, Ford led the Bobcats in 3-point field goals.

== Coaching career ==
Ford first served as a college assistant for 3 years at Western Carolina University for his former head coach at Ohio, Larry Hunter. While on staff for the Catamounts, Ford recruited two future Southern Conference Defensive Players of the year in Brigham Waginger (2010) and Richie Gordon (2011). Waginger is currently an assistant coach at Western Carolina and Gordon is playing professionally in France.

In 2009, Ford returned to Ohio to join coach John Groce as an assistant. During his time at Ohio, he helped the Bobcats win two Mid-American Conference men's basketball tournament championships. In 2010 and 2012 Ohio went into the NCAA Division I men's basketball tournament, culminating with a Sweet-Sixteen appearance against North Carolina.

When coach Groce accepted the head coach position at the University of Illinois in 2012, Ford went with him as an assistant coach. Ford helped the Fighting Illini win the 2012 Maui Invitational Tournament, win a 2013 NCAA Division I men's basketball tournament game against Colorado, and post a 23 win season in his first season at Illinois. The following season, Illinois made an appearance in the 2014 National Invitation Tournament.

=== Akron ===
As the associate head coach at Akron under Groce, he was part MAC championship teams in 2020 and 2025 and four MAC tournament wins and NCAA appearances (2022, 2024, 2025, 2026). After Groce accepted the head coach position at the College of Charleston, he was promoted to head coach on March 30, 2026.

== Head coaching record ==
Record table
Season	Team	Overall	Conference	Standing	Postseason
Akron (Mid-American Conference) (2026–present)
2026–27	Akron	2–0	0–0		
Akron:		2–0 (1.000)	0–0 (–)		
Total:		2–0 (1.000)			
National champion Postseason invitational champion Conference regular season champion Conference regular season and conference tournament champion Division regular season champion Division regular season and conference tournament champion Conference tournament champion
