= Chris Capko =

American basketball coach (born 1983)

Current position
- Title: Head coach
- Team: Ball State
- Conference: MAC
- Record: 1–3 (.250)

Biographical details
- Born: October 30, 1983 (age 43)

Playing career
- 2002–2003: Florida
- 2003–2007: South Florida
- Position: Guard

Coaching career (HC unless noted)
- 2008–2009: Marshall (GA)
- 2009–2011: Stetson (assistant)
- 2011–2013: Georgia Southern (assistant)
- 2015–2016: FIU (assistant)
- 2016–2024: USC (assistant)
- 2024–2026: SMU (AHC)
- 2026–present: Ball State

Administrative career (AD unless noted)
- 2013–2015: USC (DBO)

Head coaching record
- Overall: 1–3 (.250)

Christopher James Capko (born October 30, 1983) is an American college basketball coach and former player. He is currently the head coach for the Ball State Cardinals men's basketball team. He played college basketball for the Florida Gators and South Florida Bulls and has previously worked as a coach for the Marshall Thundering Herd, Stetson Hatters, Georgia Southern Eagles, USC Trojans, FIU Panthers and SMU Mustangs.

== Early life ==
Capko is from Lakeland, Florida. He attended Kathleen Senior High School in Lakeland where he played basketball as a point guard and was one of the top players for the 2001 state championship team. He was a team captain and three-year starter, earning first-team all-county honors as a senior while setting the school assists record. Capko also played baseball in high school.

== College career ==
After high school, Capko walked-on to play college basketball for the Florida Gators in 2002. He appeared in 10 games during the 2002–03 season before transferring to the South Florida, sitting out the 2003–04 season. He was a walk-on at South Florida as well and a backup during the 2004–05 season, before seeing time as a starter at point guard the next year. That season, Capko started 23 games and averaged 2.9 points and 4.4 assists per game, placing fifth in the Big East Conference in assists. He served as team captain as a senior in 2006–07, averaging 1.8 points and 2.2 assists in 18 games played. Capko graduated from South Florida in 2006 with a bachelor's degree in mass communication. He later attended Marshall University, earning a master's degree in adult and technical education in 2009.

== Coaching career ==
=== Assistant coach (2008–26) ===
While at Marshall, Capko served as a graduate assistant for the Marshall Thundering Herd men's basketball team. He became an assistant coach for the Stetson Hatters in 2009 and served two seasons in that role before joining the Georgia Southern Eagles as an assistant in 2011. In 2013, Capko was hired by Andy Enfield as the director of basketball operations for the USC Trojans. He served two years in that role before working as an assistant for the FIU Panthers from 2015 to 2016, after which he returned to USC as an assistant. At USC, Capko helped the school have a top-30 ranked recruiting class in eight straight years, while more than 10 of the players he coached later went into the National Basketball Association (NBA), including Bronny James, Evan Mobley, Isaiah Collier and Onyeka Okongwu. In 2024, he left USC to become the associate head coach under Enfield for the SMU Mustangs.

=== Ball State (2026–present) ===
In March 2026, Capko was hired as the new head coach for the Ball State Cardinals.

== Head coaching record ==
Record table
Season	Team	Overall	Conference	Standing	Postseason
Ball State Cardinals (Mid-American Conference) (2026–present)
2026–27	Ball State	1–3	0–0		
Ball State:		1–3 (.250)	0–0 (–)		
Total:		1–3 (.250)			
National champion Postseason invitational champion Conference regular season champion Conference regular season and conference tournament champion Division regular season champion Division regular season and conference tournament champion Conference tournament champion
