= Billy Donlon =

American college basketball coach

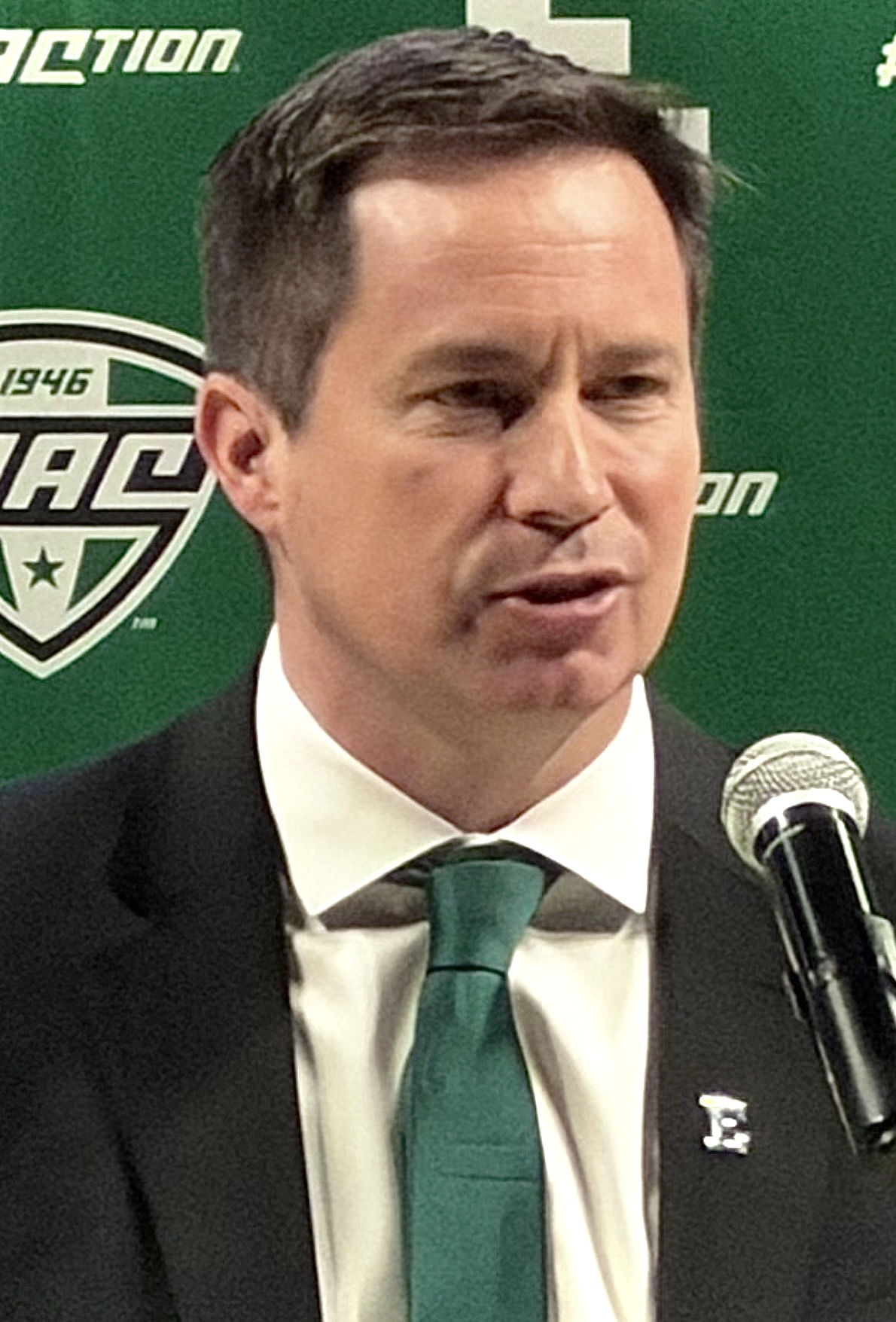
- Donlon in 2026

Current position
- Title: Head coach
- Team: Eastern Michigan
- Conference: MAC
- Record: 2–1

Biographical details
- Born: February 10, 1977 (age 49); Northbrook, Illinois, U.S.

Playing career
- 1996–1999: UNC Wilmington
- Position: Guard

Coaching career (HC unless noted)
- 1999–2000: American (assistant)
- 2000–2001: St. Peters (assistant)
- 2001–2006: UNC Wilmington (assistant)
- 2006–2010: Wright State (assoc. HC)
- 2010–2016: Wright State
- 2016–2017: Michigan (assistant)
- 2017–2019: Northwestern (assistant)
- 2019–2022: Kansas City
- 2022–2026: Clemson (associate HC)
- 2026–present: Eastern Michigan

Head coaching record
- Overall: 156–134 (.538)

Accomplishments and honors

Awards
- Horizon League Coach of the Year (2013)

William Joseph Donlon (born February 10, 1977) is an American college basketball coach who is the head coach for Eastern Michigan University. He has previously served as head coach at Wright State University and at the University of Missouri-Kansas City.

== Playing career ==
Donlon played four years of basketball at UNC Wilmington under Jerry Wainwright, scoring 901 career points and handing out 457 assists. After graduation, Donlon played professionally in France, Germany, and Ireland.

== Coaching career ==
=== Assistant coach (1999–2010) ===
Donlon started his coaching career with American and St. Peters as an assistant coach before returning to his alma mater to be an assistant coach under Brad Brownell for four seasons at UNC Wilmington. He followed Brownell when he accepted the position at Wright State.

=== Wright State (2010–2016) ===
Donlon was elevated to the position of head coach at Wright State following Brownell's departed for Clemson University. At the time of his hiring, Wright State athletic director Bob Grant praised Donlon's basketball knowledge and expertise.

On March 18, 2016, Wright State fired Donlon after 6 seasons as head coach.

=== Return to assistant coaching (2016–2019) ===
On May 4, 2016, Donlon was named assistant head coach for the Michigan Wolverines men's basketball team.

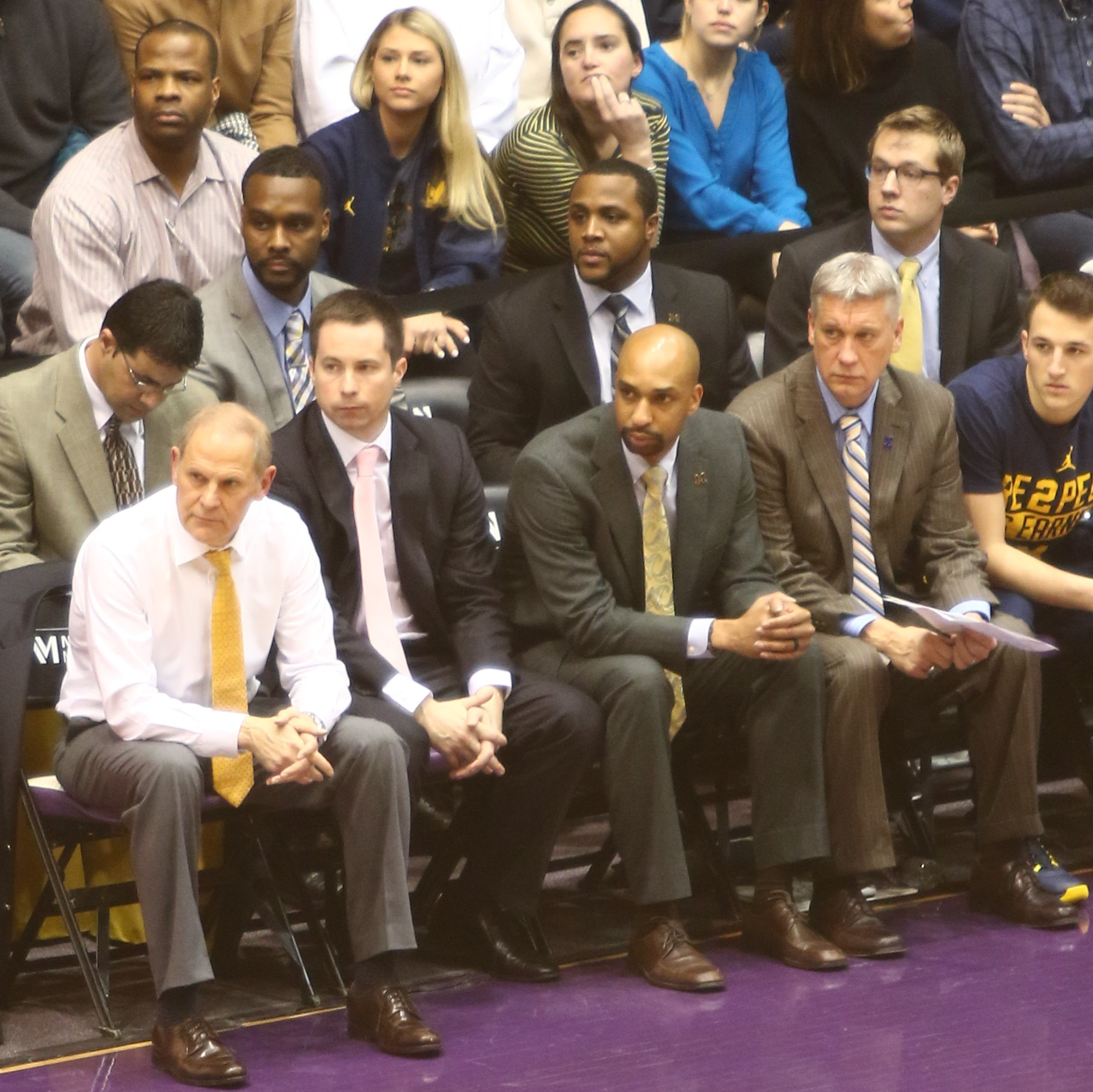
Donlon (second from left) coaching for Michigan

On June 25, 2017, Donlon was hired as an assistant coach for the Northwestern Wildcats men's basketball team, replacing Pat Baldwin, who had taken the head coaching job at Milwaukee.

=== Kansas City (2019–2022) ===
On March 26, 2019, Donlon was named the head coach of the University of Missouri-Kansas City. He replaced Kareem Richardson, and was the first Kansas City coach to take the position with previous head coaching experience since 2001. On April 21, 2022 Donlon resigned as head coach in order to "pursue other opportunities."

=== Third assistant coaching stint (2022–2026) ===
On April 25, 2022 Donlon was announced as the associate head coach at Clemson University, reuniting with Brownell for the third time as an assistant coach.

=== Eastern Michigan (2026–present) ===
On March 17, 2026, Donlon was hired as the 31st head coach at Eastern Michigan University following the firing of Stan Heath. He remained with Clemson throughout the 2026 NCAA tournament.

== Head coaching record ==
Record table
Season	Team	Overall	Conference	Standing	Postseason
Wright State Raiders (Horizon League) (2010–2016)
2010–11	Wright State	19–14	10–8	T–5th	
2011–12	Wright State	13–19	7–11	8th	
2012–13	Wright State	23–13	10–6	T–3rd	CBI Semifinal
2013–14	Wright State	21–15	10–6	3rd	CIT Second Round
2014–15	Wright State	11–20	3–13	8th	
2015–16	Wright State	22–13	13–5	T–2nd	
Wright State:		109–94 (.537)	53–49 (.520)		
Kansas City Roos (Western Athletic Conference) (2019–2020)
2019–20	Kansas City	16–14	8–7	4th	
Kansas City Roos (The Summit League) (2020–2022)
2020–21	Kansas City	11–13	7–7	T–5th	
2021–22	Kansas City	19–12	12–6	3rd	
Kansas City:		46–39 (.541)	27–20 (.574)		
Eastern Michigan Eagles (Mid-American Conference) (2026–present)
2026–27	Eastern Michigan	0–0	0–0		
Eastern Michigan:		1-1 (–)	0–0 (–)		
Total:		156–134 (.538)	80–69 (.537)		
National champion Postseason invitational champion Conference regular season champion Conference regular season and conference tournament champion Division regular season champion Division regular season and conference tournament champion Conference tournament champion
