= Philo High School =

Location
- 4000 Millers Lane; Duncan Falls, (Muskingum County), Ohio 43734; United States
- Coordinates: 39°53′02″N 81°54′37″W

Information
- Type: Public, Coeducational high school
- Superintendent: Kacey Cottrill
- Principal: Scott Mosebrook
- Teaching staff: 34.50 (FTE)
- Grades: 9-12
- Student to teacher ratio: 12.29
- Colors: Blue & Gold
- Athletics conference: Muskingum Valley League
- Nickname: Electrics
- Rivals: Maysville, John Glenn and Crooksville
- Athletic Director: Dave Thomas
- Website: website

Philo High School is a public high school in Duncan Falls, Ohio that serves grades 9-12. It is the only high school in the Franklin Local School District. The school colors, as well as the district colors, are gold and blue. They are nicknamed the "Philo Electrics" which they adopted in 1931 after the nearby, former Philo Power Plant. The current principal is Scott Mosebrook.
