= Jeff Boals =

American basketball coach (born 1972)

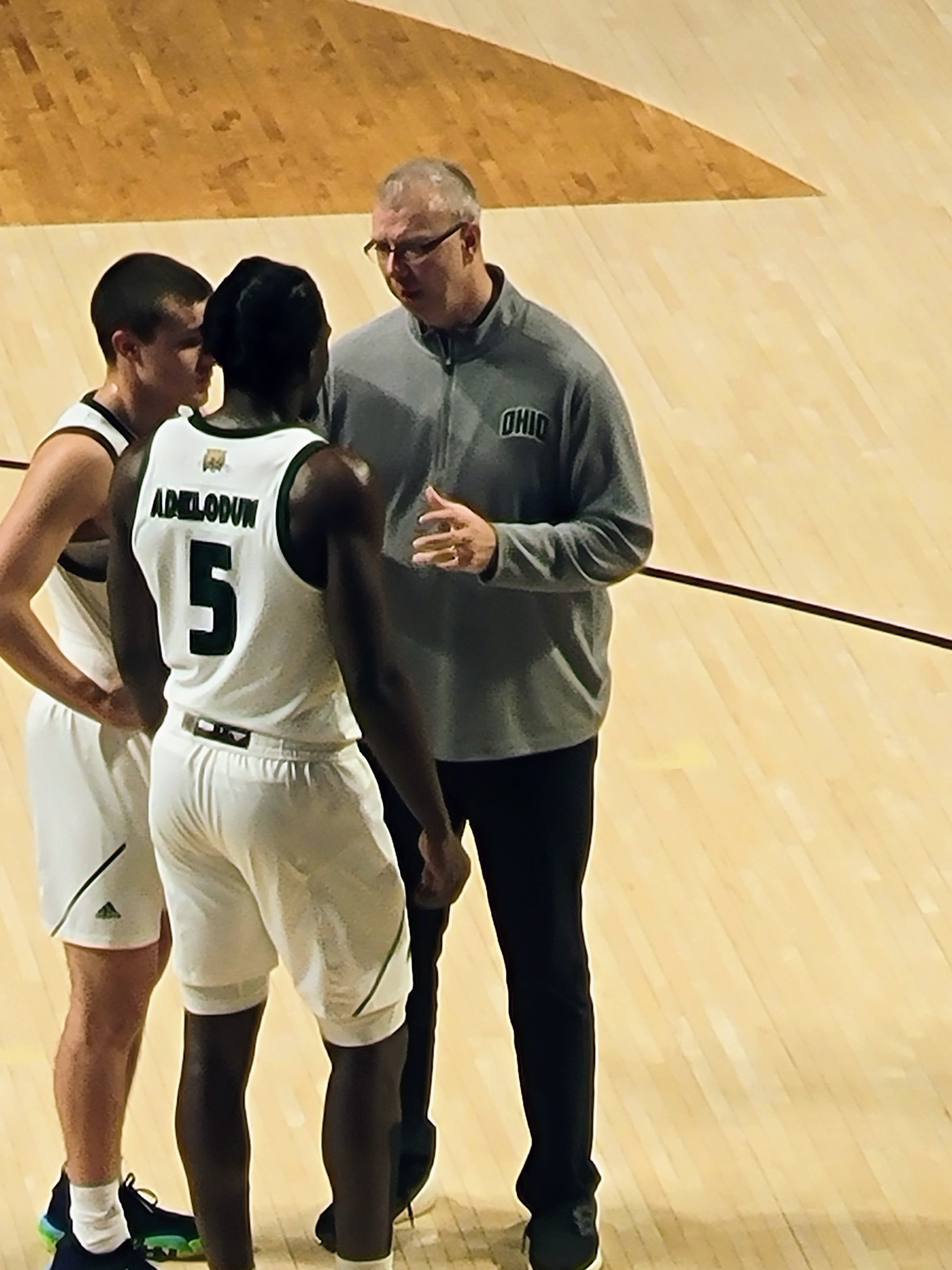
- Boals in 2022

Current position
- Title: Head coach
- Team: Ohio
- Conference: MAC
- Record: 132–94 (.584)
- Annual salary: $581,000

Biographical details
- Born: September 5, 1972 (age 54); Magnolia, Ohio, U.S.

Playing career
- 1991–1995: Ohio

Coaching career (HC unless noted)
- 1995–1996: Ohio (asst.)
- 1996–1999: Charleston (WV) (asst.)
- 1999–2003: Marshall (asst.)
- 2003–2004: Charleston (WV) (assoc. HC)
- 2004–2006: Robert Morris (asst.)
- 2006–2009: Akron (asst.)
- 2009–2016: Ohio State (asst.)
- 2016–2019: Stony Brook
- 2019–present: Ohio

Head coaching record
- Overall: 187–136 (.579)
- Tournaments: 1–1 (NCAA Division I); 1–2 (CBI)

Accomplishments and honors

Championships
- MAC tournament (2021)

Jeff Boals (born September 5, 1972) is the head coach of the Ohio Bobcats men's basketball team. Boals spent seven years as an assistant coach for the Ohio State Buckeyes men's basketball team under the tutelage of Thad Matta. In his first head coaching job, he replaced Steve Pikiell as the head coach for the Stony Brook Seawolves for three years.

== Playing career ==
A 1995 graduate of Ohio University with a Bachelor of Science degree in biological sciences, Boals was a four-year letterwinner on the Bobcats' basketball team. Also a two-year captain, he helped guide Ohio to a 1994 MAC regular season and tournament championship to send the Bobcats to the NCAA tournament, the next season the program won the Preseason National Invitation tournament. In the preseason NIT, the Bobcats notched road victories over Ohio State and Virginia before edging New Mexico State and George Washington at Madison Square Garden. Boals suffered a torn ACL in his senior year of college that ended his playing career.

== Coaching career ==
Boals landed his first coaching job as an assistant coach at his alma mater after graduating. He then took an assistant coaching job at the University of Charleston in West Virginia, where he stayed for three seasons before joining Marshall as an assistant coach from 1999 to 2003. Boals returned to Charleston as the associate head coach, for one season before jumping back to the Division I ranks with Robert Morris, then to Akron. He joined the coaching staff of Ohio State in 2009, led by Thad Matta, where he was a part of three Big Ten Conference regular-season titles, four NCAA Tournament Sweet 16 appearances, an Elite Eight, and a Final Four appearance in 2012. The Buckeyes' record was 193–62 with Boals as assistant coach. Boals recruited players such as D'Angelo Russell and Jared Sullinger to play for Ohio State.

=== Stony Brook ===
On April 8, 2016, Boals was named the 11th head coach in Stony Brook men's basketball history, and its third since moving to Division I. In Boals' first season as head coach, the Seawolves finished 18–14 (12–4), second in the America East Conference. Boals led the Seawolves to their first 20-win season under his tenure in 2018–19 after which they earned a bid to the CBI.

=== Ohio ===
On March 17, 2019, Boals resigned from Stony Brook to accept a head coaching position at his alma mater, Ohio University. Boals' contract with Ohio is for five years, with a $581,100 yearly salary. The Bobcats went 17–15 in Boals first season with Ohio. Following the 2019–2020 season, the MAC tournament was cancelled due to the start of the coronavirus pandemic. The next season Boals lead his 2020–21 team to a 17–8 record including 3 wins in the MAC tournament. They received the conference's automatic bid to the NCAA tournament as the No. 13 seed in the West region. There they upset No. 4-seeded Virginia in the first round before falling to No. 5-seeded Creighton in the second round. The Bobcats were led in the tournament by their point guard Jason Preston who declared for the NBA draft where he was the 33rd pick and acquired by the Los Angeles Clippers His 2021–22 team opened with a school best 19–3 record but struggled down the stretch to finish 25–10. His 2022-23 team had a lot of roster turnover and slipped to 19–14. His 2023-24 team finished 20–13 and tied for second in the conference. Entering the 2024-25 season, the Bobcats received 11 of the 12 first place votes to win the MAC but could only post a 16–16 record. They failed to do better in the 2025–26 season with the first losing record under Boals at 15–17. They lost in the quarterfinals of the MAC tournament for the second straight year.

== Head coaching record ==
Record table
Season	Team	Overall	Conference	Standing	Postseason
Stony Brook Seawolves (America East Conference) (2016–2019)
2016–17	Stony Brook	18–14	12–4	2nd	CBI First Round
2017–18	Stony Brook	13–19	7–9	5th	
2018–19	Stony Brook	24–9	12–4	2nd	CBI First Round*
Stony Brook:		55–42 (.567)	31–17 (.646)		
Ohio Bobcats (Mid-American Conference) (2019–present)
2019–20	Ohio	17–15	8–10	5th (East)	**
2020–21	Ohio	17–8	9–5	5th	NCAA Division I Round of 32
2021–22	Ohio	25–10	14–6	3rd	CBI Quarterfinals
2022–23	Ohio	19–14	10–8	5th	
2023–24	Ohio	20–13	13–5	T–2nd	
2024–25	Ohio	16–16	10–8	T–4th	
2025–26	Ohio	15–17	9–9	T–5th	
2026–27	Ohio	3–1	0–0		
Ohio:		132–94 (.584)	73–51 (.589)		
Total:		187–136 (.579)			
National champion Postseason invitational champion Conference regular season champion Conference regular season and conference tournament champion Division regular season champion Division regular season and conference tournament champion Conference tournament champion

*Boals left for Ohio prior to the 2019 CBI and did not coach in the Seawolves' games.
** MAC tournament had to stop due to COVID-19 pandemic.
