= Frank Martin (basketball) =

American basketball coach (born 1966)

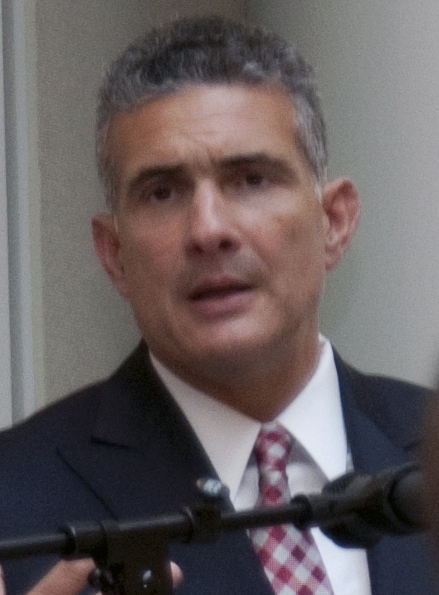
- Martin in 2011

Current position
- Title: Head coach
- Team: UMass
- Conference: MAC
- Record: 64–61 (.512)

Biographical details
- Born: March 23, 1966 (age 60); Miami, Florida, U.S.
- Education: FIU, B.S. (1993)

Coaching career (HC unless noted)
- 1985–1993: Miami HS (FL) (assistant)
- 1993–1995: North Miami HS (FL)
- 1995–1998: Miami HS (FL)
- 1999–2000: Booker T. Washington HS (FL)
- 2000–2004: Northeastern (assistant)
- 2004–2006: Cincinnati (assistant)
- 2006–2007: Kansas State (assistant)
- 2007–2012: Kansas State
- 2012–2022: South Carolina
- 2022–present: UMass

Head coaching record
- Overall: 352–262 (.573) (college)
- Tournaments: 10–5 (NCAA Division I); 2–2 (NIT)

Accomplishments and honors

Championships
- NCAA Regional — Final Four (2017)

Awards
- Jim Phelan Award (2017); USBWA District VI Coach of the Year (2010); NABC District 8 Coach of the Year (2010); Big 12 Coach of the Year (2010)

Francisco José Martin (born March 23, 1966) is an American basketball coach serving as the head coach for the University of Massachusetts men's basketball team. Martin was previously the head coach of the University of South Carolina men's basketball team for ten seasons. Prior to that, he was the head coach of Kansas State University for five seasons.

Martin has led his teams to a total of five NCAA tournaments and one Final Four appearance as a head coach. He was named the Big 12 Conference Men's Basketball Coach of the Year in 2010. He won the Jim Phelan Award in 2017.

== Early life and career ==
Martin, who grew up in Miami, Florida, is the son of Cuban political exiles and the first American-born member of his family. He graduated with a bachelor's degree in physical education from Florida International University in 1993. One of the two jobs he held while attending FIU was that of a bouncer at a local nightclub. He decided to become a full-time basketball coach in 1992 as a result of an incident in which he was subjected to gunfire, while on duty, from a group of men whom he had ejected for fighting.

At the same time, he had begun his career in basketball as the head coach of the boys' junior varsity squad at Miami High School in 1985. He served in that position for eight years until he was appointed to his first varsity coaching job at North Miami High School after he completed his studies at FIU in 1993. He returned to Miami Senior two years later to head its varsity team. Under his watch, the Stingarees won three consecutive state championships from 1996 to 1998 with teams featuring future NBA players Udonis Haslem and Steve Blake. The last of those titles was later vacated due to recruiting violations involving school employees and boosters who gave housing assistance to the players. Although he was never personally accused of any wrongdoing, Martin was dismissed in 1999. He next served as head coach at Booker T. Washington High School for one year.

== College coaching career ==
Martin joined the college ranks as an assistant coach/recruiting coordinator at Northeastern University from 2000 to 2004. He moved to the University of Cincinnati, serving one season each under Bob Huggins and Andy Kennedy. Martin followed Huggins to Kansas State, joining his staff on April 5, 2006. On April 6, 2007, almost a year to the day after his arrival in Manhattan, Martin was named head coach of the Wildcats in the wake of Huggins' resignation.

=== Kansas State ===
Martin's first season as head coach at Kansas State was marked by a number of noteworthy events. The 2007–2008 Wildcats, featuring star freshman Michael Beasley, were included in the preseason Top 25 for the first time since 1972. On January 19, 2008, Martin's Wildcats defeated then-No. 10 Texas A&M, giving the team its first win over a ranked team in nearly a year, and its first victory over a Top 10 team since beating Texas in March 2004. On January 30, 2008, Martin led Kansas State to an 84–75 victory over then-No. 2 Kansas, marking the Wildcats' first home win over their in-state rival since 1983. Ultimately, Martin led Kansas State to its first berth in the NCAA tournament since 1996.

Martin was awarded the Big 12 Conference Coach of the Year by the conference on March 7, 2010. Later that month, he led the Wildcats to the Elite 8, their best tournament performance since 1988.

He was given a contract extension through the 2014–2015 season. His salary increased to $1.2 million, plus incentives, for 2010–11. The salary would increase by $100,000 a year for each subsequent year of the contract, topping out at $1.6 million in 2014–15.

After Frank Haith left Miami to take the Missouri head coaching job in the spring of 2011, there were rumors that Martin, born and raised in Miami, might leave Kansas State to take the job. These rumors ended when it was announced that Jim Larranaga took the job at Miami.

=== South Carolina ===
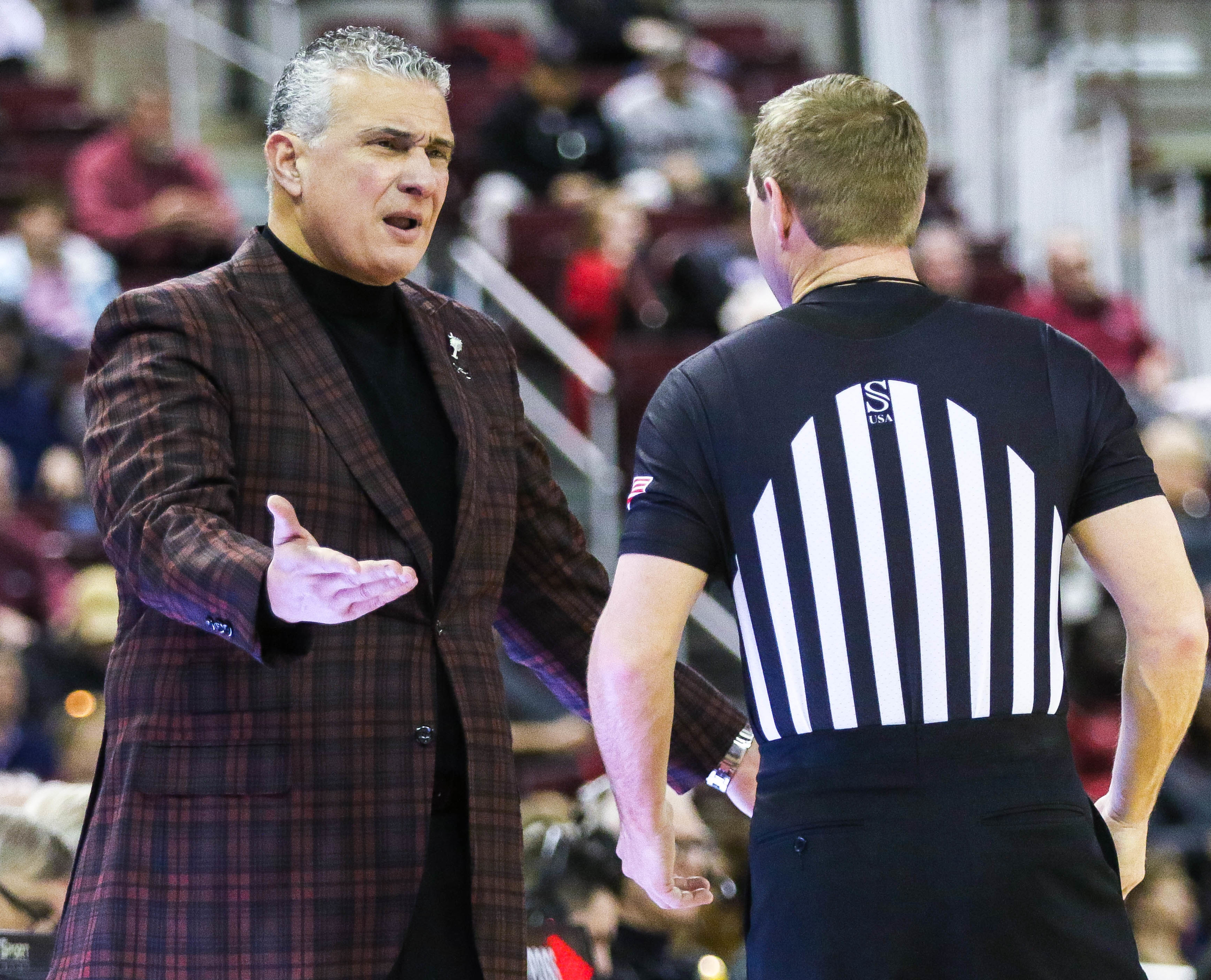
Martin in 2020

On March 26, 2012, in a text message to ESPN, Martin confirmed he had accepted the head coach position at South Carolina. On March 27, 2012, Martin was introduced as South Carolina's head coach, replacing Darrin Horn.

Martin posted losing records in each of his first two seasons at South Carolina, including a combined conference mark of 9–27. His team's most notable victory in those two seasons was a 72–67 home win against #17 Kentucky on March 1, 2014. During the 2013–14 season, Martin issued a public apology to fans and players on January 21, 2014, after a verbal tirade during the team's loss to Ole Miss. On March 6, 2014, USC Athletic Director Ray Tanner suspended Martin for the final game of the regular season for further "inappropriate verbal communication" with players.

In Martin's third season at South Carolina, he recorded his first winning season at South Carolina with a 17–16 (6–12) record. The team posted a 9–3 record in its non-conference season, concluding with a win over #9 Iowa State at the Brooklyn Hoops Showcase, and followed this by finishing its SEC regular season with a 6–12 record, then posting a 2–1 mark in the SEC Tournament.

The 2015–16 season continued the upward trend as his Gamecocks won 24 regular season games, including a 13–0 mark in non-conference games. The 11–7 mark in conference was good enough to tie for third in the SEC, but after losing to Georgia in the SEC tournament, South Carolina accepted an NIT bid.

The 2016–17 team finally broke through and earned a bid as a #7 seed to the 2017 NCAA tournament, where they earned their first win in the event since 1973 with a 20-point victory over the #10 seed Marquette Golden Eagles, followed by a win over #2 seed Duke, advancing to the program's first Sweet 16 in school history. The Gamecocks then beat Baylor to advance to the Elite 8 for the first time in school history. On Sunday, March 26, 2017, South Carolina defeated Florida in the East Regional Final to reach the school's first-ever Final Four. They played Gonzaga on April 1, 2017, and lost 77–73, ending their road to the national championship.

Following the run to the Final Four, the Gamecocks failed to reach postseason play in Martin's remaining tenure. Martin was dismissed as the head coach of South Carolina on March 14, 2022. At the time of his dismissal, he was the third winningest coach at South Carolina with a 171–147 (79–99 SEC) record.

=== Massachusetts ===
On March 25, 2022, it was announced that Martin had agreed to a five-year deal to become the next head coach at the University of Massachusetts. The team performed well at the outset of Martin's inaugural campaign in 2022-23, winning seven of its first eight contests, before struggling down the stretch with some key player injuries, and finishing 15-16. Martin also struggled with some criticism on social media. In mid-January, after the team began conference play with a 2-5 record, Martin used his postgame press conference to criticize some members of the UMass fan base for what he described as their attacks on his players.

In the 2023 offseason, although the team had lost 72% of their scoring output, UMass added Josh Cohen, the 2022-23 Co-Player of the Year in the NEC from Saint Francis (PA). Although UMass was picked to finish 13th (of 15) in the Atlantic 10, the 2023-24 squad outperformed expectations, finishing 11-7 in the conference for a fourth-place finish. Cohen and teammate Matt Cross each earned Atlantic 10 First Team honors at the end of the season, and the team finished with a 20-11 overall record, their most wins in ten seasons.

The 2024 offseason also saw another wave of players leave UMass via the transfer portal, including Cohen (to USC) and Cross (to SMU), and the coaching staff struggled in replacing them. The 2024-25 season saw UMass limp to a 1-5 start before ultimately finishing with a 12-20 overall record, their most losses since 2017-18.

== Head coaching record ==
Record table
Season	Team	Overall	Conference	Standing	Postseason
Kansas State Wildcats (Big 12 Conference) (2007–2012)
2007–08	Kansas State	21–12	10–6	3rd	NCAA Division I Round of 32
2008–09	Kansas State	22–12	9–7	T–4th	NIT Second Round
2009–10	Kansas State	29–8	11–5	T–2nd	NCAA Division I Elite Eight
2010–11	Kansas State	23–11	10–6	T–3rd	NCAA Division I Round of 32
2011–12	Kansas State	22–11	10–8	5th	NCAA Division I Round of 32
Kansas State:		117–54 (.684)	50–32 (.610)		
South Carolina Gamecocks (Southeastern Conference) (2012–2022)
2012–13	South Carolina	14–18	4–14	T–12th	
2013–14	South Carolina	14–20	5–13	13th	
2014–15	South Carolina	17–16	6–12	T–11th	
2015–16	South Carolina	25–9	11–7	T–3rd	NIT Second Round
2016–17	South Carolina	26–11	12–6	T–3rd	NCAA Division I Final Four
2017–18	South Carolina	17–16	7–11	T–11th	
2018–19	South Carolina	16–16	11–7	T–4th	
2019–20	South Carolina	18–13	10–8	T–6th	
2020–21	South Carolina	6–15	4–12	12th	
2021–22	South Carolina	18–13	9–9	T–5th	
South Carolina:		171–147 (.538)	79–99 (.444)		
UMass Minutemen (Atlantic 10 Conference) (2022–2025)
2022–23	UMass	15–16	6–12	13th	
2023–24	UMass	20–11	11–7	4th	
2024–25	UMass	12–20	7–11	T–10th	
UMass Minutemen (Mid-American Conference) (2025–present)
2025–26	UMass	17–16	7–11	T–7th	
2026–27	UMass	2–2	0–0		
UMass:		64–61 (.512)	31–37 (.456)		
Total:		352–262 (.573)			
National champion Postseason invitational champion Conference regular season champion Conference regular season and conference tournament champion Division regular season champion Division regular season and conference tournament champion Conference tournament champion

== Personal life ==
Martin is married to Anya Forrest, a former star athlete and alumna of the University of Massachusetts. They have two children, Amalia and Christian; and Martin has an elder son Brandon, whose mother Kimberly Hicks played college basketball at FAU and professional basketball in Venezuela, Israel and Germany. Brandon played for his father at both South Carolina and Massachusetts.
