= 2021–22 Northern Iowa Panthers men's basketball team =

American college basketball season

2021–22 Northern Iowa Panthers men's basketball

Missouri Valley regular season champions

NIT, Second Round
- Conference: Missouri Valley Conference
- Record: 20–12 (14–4 MVC)
- Head coach: Ben Jacobson (16th season)
- Assistant coaches: P. J. Hogan; Erik Crawford; Seth Tuttle
- Home arena: McLeod Center

2021–22 Missouri Valley Conference men's basketball standings
	Conf.				Overall
Team	W		L	PCT	W		L	PCT
Northern Iowa	14	–	4	.778	20	–	12	.625
Missouri State	13	–	5	.722	23	–	11	.676
Drake	13	–	5	.722	25	–	11	.694
Loyola Chicago †	13	–	5	.722	25	–	8	.758
Bradley	11	–	7	.611	17	–	14	.548
Southern Illinois	9	–	9	.500	16	–	14	.533
Valparaiso	6	–	12	.333	14	–	18	.438
Illinois State	5	–	13	.278	13	–	20	.394
Indiana State	4	–	14	.222	11	–	20	.355
Evansville	2	–	16	.111	6	–	24	.200
† 2022 MVC tournament winner

The 2021–22 Northern Iowa Panthers men's basketball team represented the University of Northern Iowa during the 2021–22 NCAA Division I men's basketball season. The Panthers, led by 16th-year head coach Ben Jacobson, played their home games at the McLeod Center in Cedar Falls, Iowa as members of the Missouri Valley Conference.

With a win over Loyola on February 26, 2022, the Panthers won the regular season MVC championship. They finished the regular season 18–10, 14–4 in MVC play to finish in first place. They defeated Illinois State in the quarterfinals of the MVC tournament before losing in the semifinals to Loyola. As a No. 1 seed who didn’t win their conference tournament, they received an automatic bid to the National Invitation Tournament where they defeated Saint Louis in the first round before losing in the second round to BYU.

== Previous season ==
In a season limited due to the ongoing COVID-19 pandemic, the Panthers finished the 2020–21 season 10–15, 7–11 in MVC play to finish in a three-way tie for fifth place. Former MVC Player of the Year and first-team all-MVC star A. J. Green played in only three games before he underwent hip surgery and missed the remainder of the season.

As the No. 7 seed in the MVC tournament, the Panthers defeated Illinois State in the first round. However, they were forced to forfeit their quarterfinal game against Drake due to a positive COVID test and subsequent contact tracing within the UNI program.

== Offseason ==
=== Departures ===
Name	Number	Pos.	Height	Weight	Year	Hometown	Reason for departure
Evan Gauger	10	G	6'2"	175	RS Freshman	Indianola, IA	In transfer portal
Goanar Mar	14	F	6'7"	215	Senior	Minneapolis, MN	Left program for personal reasons

=== 2021 recruiting class ===
College recruiting information
Name	Hometown	School	Height	Weight	Commit date
Michael Duax; SF	Dubuque, IA	Hempstead High School	6 ft 5 in (1.96 m)	200 lb (91 kg)	Feb 11, 2020
Michael Duax; SF	Recruit ratings: Scout: Rivals: (N/A)				
Chase Courbat; C	Cedar Falls, IA	Cedar Falls High School	6 ft 10 in (2.08 m)	230 lb (100 kg)	Aug 26, 2020
Chase Courbat; C	Recruit ratings: Scout: Rivals: (N/A)				
Landon Wolf; SG	Cedar Falls, IA	Cedar Falls High School	6 ft 5 in (1.96 m)	185 lb (84 kg)	Oct 23, 2020
Landon Wolf; SG	Recruit ratings: Scout: Rivals: (N/A)				
Overall recruit ranking:
Note: In many cases, Scout, Rivals, 247Sports, On3, and ESPN may conflict in their listings of height and weight.; In these cases, the average was taken. ESPN grades are on a 100-point scale.; Sources: "2021 Team Ranking". Rivals.

=== 2022 recruiting class ===
College recruiting information (2022)
Name	Hometown	School	Height	Weight	Commit date
Trey Campbell; PG	Cedar Falls, IA	Cedar Falls High School	6 ft 4 in (1.93 m)	175 lb (79 kg)	Nov 10, 2021
Trey Campbell; PG	Recruit ratings: Scout: Rivals: (N/A)				
Overall recruit ranking:
Note: In many cases, Scout, Rivals, 247Sports, On3, and ESPN may conflict in their listings of height and weight.; In these cases, the average was taken. ESPN grades are on a 100-point scale.; Sources: "2022 Team Ranking". Rivals.

== Roster ==
2021–22 Northern Iowa Panthers men's basketball team
Players
Coaches

Pos.	#	Name	Height	Weight	Year	Previous school	Hometown
G	0	Nate Heise	6 ft 4 in (1.93 m)	200 lb (91 kg)	Fr	Lincoln	Lake City, MN
F	1	Cole Henry	6 ft 9 in (2.06 m)	230 lb (104 kg)	RS Fr	Oskaloosa	Oskaloosa, IA
G	3	Tywhon Pickford	6 ft 4 in (1.93 m)	205 lb (93 kg)	Sr	Maple Grove	Minneapolis, MN
G	4	A. J. Green	6 ft 4 in (1.93 m)	200 lb (91 kg)	Jr	Cedar Falls	Cedar Falls, IA
G	5	Landon Wolf (redshirt)	6 ft 4 in (1.93 m)	195 lb (88 kg)	Fr	Cedar Falls	Cedar Falls, IA
G	11	Trae Berhow	6 ft 5 in (1.96 m)	200 lb (91 kg)	Sr	Watertown Mayer; Pepperdine	Watertown, MN
G	13	Bowen Born	5 ft 11 in (1.8 m)	175 lb (79 kg)	So	Norwalk	Norwalk, IA
F	15	Michael Duax (redshirt)	6 ft 5 in (1.96 m)	215 lb (98 kg)	Fr	Hempstead	Dubuque, IA
F	20	Chase Courbat (redshirt)	6 ft 9 in (2.06 m)	235 lb (107 kg)	Fr	Cedar Falls	Cedar Falls, IA
G	22	Antwan Kimmons	6 ft 0 in (1.83 m)	190 lb (86 kg)	So	Tartan	Oakdale, MN
F	23	Derek Krogmann (W)	6 ft 7 in (2.01 m)	235 lb (107 kg)	RS Fr	West Delaware	Manchester, IA
F	32	Tytan Anderson	6 ft 6 in (1.98 m)	190 lb (86 kg)	Fr	North Scott	Eldridge, IA
F	33	Drew Daniel (W)	6 ft 6 in (1.98 m)	215 lb (98 kg)	Fr	Dowling Catholic	West Des Moines, IA
F	34	James Betz	6 ft 6 in (1.98 m)	230 lb (104 kg)	So	Garner–Hayfield–Ventura	Ventura, IA
F	35	Noah Carter	6 ft 6 in (1.98 m)	225 lb (102 kg)	So	Dubuque Senior	Dubuque, IA
F	50	Austin Phyfe	6 ft 9 in (2.06 m)	250 lb (113 kg)	RS Jr	Waverly-Shell Rock	Waverly, IA

Head coach

- Ben Jacobson (North Dakota)

Assistant coach(es)

- P. J. Hogan (Morningside)
- Erik Crawford (Iowa State)
- Seth Tuttle (Northern Iowa)

Legend

- (C) Team captain
- (S) Suspended
- (I) Ineligible
- (W) Walk-on
- Injured
- Current redshirt

Roster

== Schedule and results ==
Date time, TV	Rank^{#}	Opponent^{#}	Result	Record	Site (attendance) city, state
Regular season
November 9, 2021*; 7:00 p.m., ESPN3		Nicholls	L 58–62	0–1	McLeod Center (2,328); Cedar Falls, IA
November 11, 2021*; 5:00 p.m., ESPN+		Vermont	L 57–71	0–2	McLeod Center (1,773); Cedar Falls, IA
November 14, 2021*; 5:00 p.m., ESPN3		Dubuque	W 95–58	1–2	McLeod Center (1,307); Cedar Falls, IA
November 17, 2021*; 7:00 p.m., ESPN+		at No. 16 Arkansas	L 80–92	1–3	Bud Walton Arena (19,200); Fayetteville, AR
November 27, 2021*; 1:00 p.m., ESPN+		at No. 16 St. Bonaventure	W 90–80	2–3	Reilly Center (4,296); Olean, NY
December 1, 2021; 7:00 p.m., ESPN+		at Bradley	L 69–71	2–4 (0–1)	Carver Arena (3,551); Peoria, IL
December 5, 2021*; 1:00 p.m., ESPN+		Richmond	L 52–60	2–5	McLeod Center (2,337); Cedar Falls, IA
December 14, 2021*; 7:00 p.m., ESPN+		Jackson State	W 66–56	3–5	McLeod Center (1,679); Cedar Falls, IA
December 18, 2021*; 3:00 p.m., Stadium		at Marshall	W 75–60	4–5	Cam Henderson Center (3,849); Huntington, WV
December 22, 2021*; 2:00 p.m., ESPNU		vs. Liberty; Diamond Head Classic First Round	L 74–76	4–6	Stan Sheriff Center; Honolulu, HI
December 23, 2021*; 5:30 p.m., ESPNU		vs. Wyoming; Diamond Head Classic Consolation 2nd Round	L 69–71	4–7	Stan Sheriff Center (3,951); Honolulu, HI
December 25, 2021*; 2:30 pm, ESPNU		vs. Hawaii; Diamond Head Classic 7th place game	Canceled due to COVID-19 issues		Stan Sheriff Center; Honolulu, HI
December 29, 2021*; 7:00 p.m., ESPN3		Wartburg	Canceled due to COVID-19 issues		McLeod Center; Cedar Falls, IA
January 2, 2022; 1:00 p.m., ESPN+		Evansville	W 83–61	5–7 (1–1)	McLeod Center (1,587); Cedar Falls, IA
January 5, 2022; 8:00 p.m., ESPN+		Valparaiso	W 92–65	6–7 (2–1)	McLeod Center (1,387); Cedar Falls, IA
January 8, 2022; 5:00 p.m., CBSSN		at Missouri State	W 85–84	7–7 (3–1)	JQH Arena (3,352); Springfield, MO
January 11, 2022; 7:00 p.m., ESPN+		Indiana State	W 80–74 ^{OT}	8–7 (4–1)	McLeod Center (1,797); Cedar Falls, IA
January 15, 2022; 7:00 p.m., ESPN+		at Southern Illinois	W 69–68	9–7 (5–1)	Banterra Center (4,690); Carbondale, IL
January 19, 2022; 6:00 p.m., ESPN+		at Valparaiso	L 80–83 ^{OT}	9–8 (5–2)	Athletics–Recreation Center (1,414); Valparaiso, IN
January 22, 2022; 5:00 p.m., ESPNU		Drake	L 74–82 ^{OT}	9–9 (5–3)	McLeod Center (4,361); Cedar Falls, IA
January 26, 2022; 6:00 p.m., ESPN+		at Evansville	W 64–59	10–9 (6–3)	Ford Center (2,770); Evansville, IN
January 29, 2022; 1:00 p.m., ESPN+		Illinois State	W 79–64	11–9 (7–3)	McLeod Center (2,669); Cedar Falls, IA
February 2, 2022; 7:00 p.m., ESPN+		Bradley	W 78–65	12–9 (8–3)	McLeod Center (2,655); Cedar Falls, IA
February 5, 2022; 5:00 p.m., ESPNU		at Drake	W 74–69 ^{OT}	13–9 (9–3)	Knapp Center (5,984); Des Moines, IA
February 9, 2022; 7:00 p.m., ESPN+		Southern Illinois	W 53–44	14–9 (10–3)	McLeod Center (2,300); Cedar Falls, IA
February 13, 2022; 3:00 p.m., ESPN2		at Loyola–Chicago	L 58–85	14–10 (10–4)	Joseph J. Gentile Arena (4,019); Chicago, IL
February 15, 2022; 7:00 p.m., ESPN+		at Illinois State	W 72–70	15–10 (11–4)	Redbird Arena (3,039); Normal, IL
February 20, 2022; 1:00 p.m., ESPN2		Missouri State	W 95–75	16–10 (12–4)	McLeod Center (3,353); Cedar Falls, IA
February 23, 2022; 6:00 p.m., ESPN+		at Indiana State	W 88–82	17–10 (13–4)	Hulman Center (3,684); Terre Haute, IN
February 26, 2022; 5:00 p.m., ESPNU		Loyola–Chicago	W 102–96 ^{OT}	18–10 (14–4)	McLeod Center (6,497); Cedar Falls, IA
MVC tournament
March 4, 2022; 12:00 p.m., MVC TV	(1)	vs. (8) Illinois State; Quarterfinals	W 78–65	19–10	Enterprise Center; St. Louis, MO
March 5, 2022; 2:30 p.m., CBSSN	(1)	vs. (4) Loyola–Chicago; Semifinals	L 43–66	19–11	Enterprise Center; St. Louis, MO
NIT
March 16, 2022*; 7:00 p.m., ESPN+		at (3) Saint Louis; First Round – SMU Bracket	W 80–68	20–11	Chaifetz Arena (3,521); St. Louis, MO
March 19, 2022*; 8:00 p.m., ESPN2		at (2) BYU; Second Round – SMU Bracket	L 71–90	20–12	Marriott Center (7,554); Provo, UT
*Non-conference game. ^{#}Rankings from AP Poll. (#) Tournament seedings in parentheses. All times are in Central Time.
