= 2021–22 Southern Illinois Salukis men's basketball team =

American college basketball season

2021–22 Southern Illinois Salukis men's basketball
- Conference: Missouri Valley Conference
- Record: 16–15 (9–9 MVC)
- Head coach: Bryan Mullins (3rd season)
- Assistant coaches: Brendan Mullins; Pat Monaghan; Jevon Mamon
- Home arena: Banterra Center

2021–22 Missouri Valley Conference men's basketball standings
	Conf.				Overall
Team	W		L	PCT	W		L	PCT
Northern Iowa	14	–	4	.778	20	–	12	.625
Missouri State	13	–	5	.722	23	–	11	.676
Drake	13	–	5	.722	25	–	11	.694
Loyola Chicago †	13	–	5	.722	25	–	8	.758
Bradley	11	–	7	.611	17	–	14	.548
Southern Illinois	9	–	9	.500	16	–	14	.533
Valparaiso	6	–	12	.333	14	–	18	.438
Illinois State	5	–	13	.278	13	–	20	.394
Indiana State	4	–	14	.222	11	–	20	.355
Evansville	2	–	16	.111	6	–	24	.200
† 2022 MVC tournament winner

The 2021–22 Southern Illinois Salukis men's basketball team represented Southern Illinois University Carbondale during the 2021–22 NCAA Division I men's basketball season. The Salukis were led by third-year head coach Bryan Mullins and played their home games at the Banterra Center in Carbondale, Illinois as members of the Missouri Valley Conference. They finished the season 16–15, 9–9 in MVC play to finish in sixth place. They lost in the quarterfinals of the MVC tournament to Drake.

== Previous season ==
In a season limited due to the ongoing COVID-19 pandemic, the Salukis finished the 2020–21 season 12–14, 5–13 in MVC play to finish in ninth place. In the MVC tournament, the Salukis defeated Bradley in the first round before losing to the Loyola in the quarterfinals.

== Roster ==
2021–22 Southern Illinois Salukis men's basketball team
Players
Coaches

Pos.	#	Name	Height	Weight	Year	Previous school	Hometown
G	0	Foster Wonders	6 ft 5 in (1.96 m)	205 lb (93 kg)	Fr	Iron Mountain High School	Iron Mountain, MI
F	1	Marcus Domask	6 ft 6 in (1.98 m)	215 lb (98 kg)	Jr	Waupun High School	Waupun, WI
C	2	Scottie Ebube	6 ft 10 in (2.08 m)	265 lb (120 kg)	Fr	Mundelein High School	Mundelein, IL
G	3	Dalton Banks	6 ft 2 in (1.88 m)	185 lb (84 kg)	So	North High School	Eau Clair, WI
G	5	Lance Jones	6 ft 1 in (1.85 m)	190 lb (86 kg)	Jr	Evanston Township	Evanston, IL
G	10	Ben Harvey	6 ft 5 in (1.96 m)	205 lb (93 kg)	Jr	Eastern Illinois	Jonesboro, AR
F	11	J.D. Muila	6 ft 8 in (2.03 m)	240 lb (109 kg)	Jr	Indian Hills Community College	Ottawa, ON
G	12	Chris Cross	6 ft 2 in (1.88 m)	195 lb (88 kg)	So	Urbana High School	Urbana, IL
C	14	Kyler Filewich	6 ft 9 in (2.06 m)	250 lb (113 kg)	So	Orangeview Prep	Winnipeg, MB
F	21	Will Keller	6 ft 7 in (2.01 m)	220 lb (100 kg)	Sr	John A. Logan	Marion, IL
G	22	Steven Verplancken Jr.	6 ft 4 in (1.93 m)	205 lb (93 kg)	Jr	Glenville State	San Pedro, DR
F	23	Troy D'Amico	6 ft 7 in (2.01 m)	210 lb (95 kg)	Fr	Notre Dame College Prep	Chicago, IL
G	24	Trent Brown	6 ft 2 in (1.88 m)	185 lb (84 kg)	Jr	Pinnacle High School	Scottsdale, AZ
G	25	Ben Coupet Jr.	6 ft 7 in (2.01 m)	185 lb (84 kg)	Sr	University of Arkansas-Little Rock	Chicago, IL
F	33	Anthony D’Avanzo	6 ft 8 in (2.03 m)	215 lb (98 kg)	Sr	Lewis University; Notre Dame College Prep	Harwood Heights, IL

Head coach

- Bryan Mullins (Southern Illinois)

Assistant coach(es)

- Brendan Mullins (Saint Michael's)
- Pat Monaghan (Lewis)
- Jevon Marmon (Barat College)

Legend

- (C) Team captain
- (S) Suspended
- (I) Ineligible
- (W) Walk-on
- Injured
- Current redshirt

Roster

== Schedule and results ==
Date time, TV	Rank^{#}	Opponent^{#}	Result	Record	Site city, state
Exhibition
October 26, 2021*; 7:00 pm		Henderson State	W 66–52	–	Banterra Center (4,087); Carbondale, IL
Regular season
November 9, 2021*; 5:00 pm, ESPN+		at Little Rock	L 66–69	0–1	Jack Stephens Center; Little Rock, AR
November 12, 2021*; 7:00 pm, ESPN+		Austin Peay	W 73–55	1–1	Banterra Center (5,000); Carbondale, IL
November 19, 2021*; 7:00 pm, ESPN3		vs. Colorado; Paradise Jam tournament first round	W 67–63	2–1	Sports and Fitness Center (842); St. Thomas, U.S. Virgin Islands
November 21, 2021*; 7:00 pm, ESPN3		vs. Northeastern; Paradise Jam Tournament semifinals	L 47–59	2–2	Sports and Fitness Center (879); St. Thomas, U.S. Virgin Islands
November 22, 2021*; 4:45 pm, ESPN3		vs. Creighton; Paradise Jam Tournament 3rd Place Game	L 64–66	2–3	Sports and Fitness Center (879); St. Thomas, U.S. Virgin Islands
November 26, 2021*; 7:00 pm, ESPN3		Alcorn State	W 62–59	3–3	Banterra Center (4,190); Carbondale, IL
December 1, 2021; 6:00 pm, ESPN3		at Evansville	W 54–52	4–3 (1–0)	Ford Center (3,318); Evansville, IN
December 4, 2021*; 8:00 pm, Marquee/ESPN3		Southern Miss	W 66–41	5–3	Banterra Center (4,513); Carbondale, IL
December 11, 2021*; 1:00 pm, ESPN+		at Tulsa	L 65–69	5–4	Reynolds Center (2,388); Tulsa, OK
December 15, 2021*; 7:00 pm, ESPN+		Southeast Missouri State	W 80–55	6–4	Banterra Center (4,030); Carbondale, IL
December 18, 2021*; 3:00 pm, ESPN3		Maryville	W 75–55	7–4	Banterra Center (3,952); Carbondale, IL
December 22, 2021*; 4:00 pm, WCC Network		at San Francisco	L 52–64	7–5	War Memorial at The Sobrato Center (1,543); San Francisco, CA
December 28, 2021*; 7:00 pm, ESPN3		Grambling State	W 75–64	8–5	Banterra Center (4,026); Carbondale, IL
January 8, 2022; 6:00 pm, ESPN+		at Valparaiso	W 63–60	9–5 (2–0)	Athletics–Recreation Center (1,321); Valparaiso, IN
January 12, 2022; 7:00 pm, ESPN+		at Missouri State	L 76–81	9–6 (2–1)	JQH Arena (3,886); Springfield, MO
January 15, 2022; 7:00 pm, ESPN+		Northern Iowa	L 68–69	9–7 (2–2)	Banterra Center (4,690); Carbondale, IL
January 17, 2022; 7:00 pm, ESPN+		Drake; Rescheduled from January 5	L 59–60	9–8 (2–3)	Banterra Center (4,112); Carbondale, IL
January 19, 2022; 7:00 pm, ESPN+		Indiana State	W 63–55	10–8 (3–3)	Banterra Center (4,142); Carbondale, IL
January 22, 2022; 7:00 pm, ESPN+		at Bradley	L 62–70	10–9 (3–4)	Carver Arena (3,987); Peoria, IL
January 25, 2022; 7:00 pm, BSMW		at Loyola–Chicago	L 47–59	10–10 (3–5)	Joseph J. Gentile Arena (2,941); Chicago, IL
January 27, 2022; 7:00 pm, BSMW		Loyola–Chicago	L 39–44	10–11 (3–6)	Banterra Center (4,315); Carbondale, IL
January 30, 2022; 4:00 pm, ESPN+		Valparaiso	W 77–55	11–11 (4–6)	Banterra Center (4,254); Carbondale, IL
Feb 2, 2022; 8:00 pm, BSMW		Missouri State	L 54–69	11–12 (4–7)	Banterra Center (3,630); Carbondale, IL
Feb 5, 2022; 7:00 pm, Marquee/ESPN+		at Illinois State	W 75–69	12–12 (5–7)	Redbird Arena (4,276); Normal, IL
February 9, 2022; 7:00 pm, ESPN+		at Northern Iowa	L 44–53	12–13 (5–8)	McLeod Center (2,300); Cedar Falls, IA
February 12, 2022; 7:00 pm, ESPN3		Evansville	W 69–62	13–13 (6–8)	Banterra Center (4,554); Carbondale, IL
February 15, 2022; 7:00 pm, ESPN+		Bradley	W 65–57	14–13 (7–8)	Banterra Center (4,432); Carbondale, IL
February 19, 2022; 12:00 pm, ESPN+		at Indiana State	W 76–72	15–13 (8–8)	Hulman Center (3,486); Terre Haute, IN
February 23, 2022; 7:00 pm, ESPN+		Illinois State	W 90–69	16–13 (9–8)	Banterra Center (4,390); Carbondale, IL
February 26, 2022; 3:00 pm, CBSSN		at Drake	L 60–62	16–14 (9–9)	Knapp Center (4,417); Des Moines, IA
MVC tournament
March 4, 2022; 8:30 pm, MVC TV	(6)	vs. (3) Drake; Quarterfinals	L 52–65	16–15	Enterprise Center (5,503); St. Louis, MO
*Non-conference game. ^{#}Rankings from AP Poll. (#) Tournament seedings in parentheses. All times are in Central Time.
