= 2021–22 Valparaiso Beacons men's basketball team =

American college basketball season

2021–22 Valparaiso Beacons men's basketball
- Conference: Missouri Valley Conference
- Record: 14–18 (6–12 MVC)
- Head coach: Matt Lottich (6th season)
- Assistant coaches: Luke Gore; Rob Holloway; Matt Bowen
- Home arena: Athletics–Recreation Center

2021–22 Missouri Valley Conference men's basketball standings
| | Conf. | | | | Overall |
| Team | W | | L | PCT | W | | L | PCT |
|---|---|---|---|---|---|---|---|---|
| Northern Iowa | 14 | – | 4 | .778 | 20 | – | 12 | .625 |
| Missouri State | 13 | – | 5 | .722 | 23 | – | 11 | .676 |
| Drake | 13 | – | 5 | .722 | 25 | – | 11 | .694 |
| Loyola Chicago † | 13 | – | 5 | .722 | 25 | – | 8 | .758 |
| Bradley | 11 | – | 7 | .611 | 17 | – | 14 | .548 |
| Southern Illinois | 9 | – | 9 | .500 | 16 | – | 14 | .533 |
| Valparaiso | 6 | – | 12 | .333 | 14 | – | 18 | .438 |
| Illinois State | 5 | – | 13 | .278 | 13 | – | 20 | .394 |
| Indiana State | 4 | – | 14 | .222 | 11 | – | 20 | .355 |
| Evansville | 2 | – | 16 | .111 | 6 | – | 24 | .200 |
† 2022 MVC tournament winner

The 2021–22 Valparaiso Beacons men's basketball team represented Valparaiso University during the 2021–22 NCAA Division I men's basketball season. The Beacons, led by sixth-year head coach Matt Lottich, played their home games at the Athletics–Recreation Center as members of the Missouri Valley Conference.

Formerly nicknamed the Crusaders, the university dropped that name and associated mascot and logos in 2021 because of the "negative connotation and violence associated with the Crusader imagery," and because of its use by certain hate groups. The school announced on August 10, 2021, that its athletic teams would officially be known as Beacons effective immediately.

== Previous season ==
In a season limited due to the ongoing COVID-19 pandemic, Valparaiso finished the 2020–21 season 10–18, 7–11 in MVC play to finish a three-way tie for fifth place. As the No. 6 seed in the MVC tournament, they lost to Missouri State in the quarterfinals.

== Offseason ==
=== Departures ===
| Name | Number | Pos. | Height | Weight | Year | Hometown | Reason for departure |
|---|---|---|---|---|---|---|---|
| Goodnews Kpegeol | 0 | G | 6'5" | 200 | RS Sophomore | St. Paul, MN | Transferred to Gulf Coast State College |
| Sigurd Lorange | 1 | G | 5'11" | 185 | Sophomore | Trondheim, Norway | Transferred to Converse University |
| Zion Morgan | 2 | G | 6'5" | 190 | RS Senior | Chicago, IL | Graduated |
| Steven Helm | 3 | G | 6'2" | 180 | RS Sophomore | Valparaiso, IN | Transferred to Indiana Tech |
| Daniel Sackey | 4 | G | 5'9" | 175 | Junior | Winnipeg, MB | Transferred to New Orleans |
| Donovan Clay | 5 | G/F | 6'7" | 205 | Sophomore | Alton, IL | Transferred to Missouri State |
| Mileek McMillan | 22 | F | 6'8" | 230 | Senior | Merrillville, IN | Transferred to Western Michigan |
| Nick Robinson | 25 | G | 6'5" | 215 | RS Senior | Chicago, IL | Transferred to Western Carolina |
| Jacob Ognacevic | 34 | F | 6'8" | 210 | Freshman | Sheboygan, WI | Transferred to Lipscomb |

=== Incoming transfers ===
| Name | Number | Pos. | Height | Weight | Year | Hometown | Previous School |
|---|---|---|---|---|---|---|---|
| Trevor Anderson | 21 | G | 6'3" | 205 | RS Senior | Stevens Point, WI | Wisconsin |
| Joe Hedstrom | 32 | C | 7'0" | 240 | RS Junior | Hopkins, MN | Wisconsin |
| Kobe King | 35 | G | 6'4" | 205 | Senior | La Crosse, WI | Wisconsin |
| Thomas Kithier | 0 | F | 6'8" | 235 | Senior | Clarkston, MI | Michigan State |
| Kevion Taylor | 12 | G/F | 6'5" | 210 | RS Senior | Milwaukee, WI | Winona State |

=== 2021 recruiting class ===
College recruiting
| Name | Hometown | School | Height | Weight | Commit date |
|---|---|---|---|---|---|
| Cam Palesse #1 PG | Waukesha, WI | Waukesha West | 6 ft 5 in (1.96 m) | 190 lb (86 kg) | |
| Cam Palesse #1 PG | Recruit ratings: No ratings found | | | | |
| Darius DeAveiro #4 PG | Kanata, ON | Orangeville Prep | 6 ft 0 in (1.83 m) | 170 lb (77 kg) | |
| Darius DeAveiro #4 PG | Recruit ratings: No ratings found | | | | |
| Keyondre Young #5 SG | Del City, OK | Del City | 6 ft 8 in (2.03 m) | 180 lb (82 kg) | |
| Keyondre Young #5 SG | Recruit ratings: No ratings found | | | | |
| Trey Woodyard #33 SF | London, OH | International Sports Academy | 6 ft 6 in (1.98 m) | 190 lb (86 kg) | |
| Trey Woodyard #33 SF | Recruit ratings: No ratings found | | | | |
Overall recruit ranking:
Note: In many cases, Scout, Rivals, 247Sports, On3, and ESPN may conflict in their listings of height and weight.; In these cases, the average was taken. ESPN grades are on a 100-point scale.; Sources:

== Roster ==
2021–22 Valparaiso Beacons men's basketball team
Players
Coaches

| Pos. | # | Name | Height | Weight | Year | Previous school | Hometown |
|---|---|---|---|---|---|---|---|
| F | 0 | Thomas Kithier | 6 ft 8 in (2.03 m) | 235 lb (107 kg) | Sr | Clarkston HS; Michigan State | Macomb, MI |
| G | 1 | Cam Palesse | 6 ft 5 in (1.96 m) | 190 lb (86 kg) | Fr | Waukesha West HS | Waukesha, WI |
| G | 2 | Preston Ruedinger (W) | 6 ft 2 in (1.88 m) | 180 lb (82 kg) | Fr | Lourdes Academy | Oshkosh, WI |
| G/F | 3 | Connor Barrett | 6 ft 6 in (1.98 m) | 200 lb (91 kg) | So | Loyola Academy | Chicago, IL |
| G | 4 | Darius DeAveiro | 6 ft 0 in (1.83 m) | 165 lb (75 kg) | Fr | Orangeville Prep | Kanata, ON |
| F | 5 | Keyondre Young | 6 ft 8 in (2.03 m) | 180 lb (82 kg) | Fr | Del City HS | Del City, OK |
| G | 10 | Eron Gordon | 6 ft 3 in (1.91 m) | 205 lb (93 kg) | RS Sr | Cathedral HS; Seton Hall | Indianapolis, IN |
| C | 11 | Emil Freese-Vilien | 6 ft 10 in (2.08 m) | 255 lb (116 kg) | Jr | Falkonergardens Gymnasium | Copenhagen, Denmark |
| G/F | 12 | Kevion Taylor | 6 ft 5 in (1.96 m) | 210 lb (95 kg) | RS Sr | Whitnall HS; Winona State | Milwaukee, WI |
| G | 13 | Sheldon Edwards | 6 ft 4 in (1.93 m) | 180 lb (82 kg) | So | Palm Beach Lakes HS; TLAP Sports Academy | West Palm Beach, FL |
| G | 15 | Luke Morrill (W) | 6 ft 2 in (1.88 m) | 195 lb (88 kg) | Jr | Montini Catholic HS | Lombard, IL |
| G/F | 20 | Tyler Fricke (W) | 6 ft 1 in (1.85 m) | 170 lb (77 kg) | So | Buffalo Grove HS | Arlington Heights, IL |
| G | 21 | Trevor Anderson | 6 ft 3 in (1.91 m) | 205 lb (93 kg) | RS Sr | SPASH; Wisconsin | Stevens Point, WI |
| F | 22 | Brock Pappas (W) | 6 ft 4 in (1.93 m) | 235 lb (107 kg) | Sr | Washington Township HS | Valparaiso, IN |
| F | 23 | Ben Krikke | 6 ft 9 in (2.06 m) | 235 lb (107 kg) | Jr | Jasper Place HS | Edmonton, AB |
| C | 32 | Joe Hedstrom | 7 ft 0 in (2.13 m) | 240 lb (109 kg) | RS Jr | Hopkins HS; Wisconsin | Hopkins, MN |
| F | 33 | Trey Woodyard | 6 ft 6 in (1.98 m) | 190 lb (86 kg) | Fr | International Sports Academy | London, OH |
| G | 35 | Kobe King | 6 ft 4 in (1.93 m) | 205 lb (93 kg) | Sr | La Crosse Central HS; Wisconsin | La Crosse, WI |

Head coach

- Matt Lottich (Stanford)

Assistant coach(es)

- Luke Gore (Bethel (TN))
- Rob Holloway (Eastern Illinois)
- Matt Bowen (Indiana)

Legend

- (C) Team captain
- (S) Suspended
- (I) Ineligible
- (W) Walk-on
- Injured
- Current redshirt

Roster
Last update: September 4, 2021

== Schedule and results ==
| Date time, TV | Rank^{#} | Opponent^{#} | Result | Record | Site (attendance) city, state |
Exhibition
| October 30, 2021*; 6:00 pm | | Ashland | L 78–87 | | Athletics–Recreation Center (1,671); Valparaiso, IN |
| November 4, 2021*; 6:00 pm | | Flagler | L 67–70 | | Athletics–Recreation Center (1,567); Valparaiso, IN |
Regular season
| November 9, 2021*; 6:00 pm, ESPN+ | | Toledo | L 61–69 | 0–1 | Athletics–Recreation Center (2,824); Valparaiso, IN |
| November 13, 2021*; 12:00 pm, ESPN3 | | UIC | L 70–74 ^{OT} | 0–2 | Athletics–Recreation Center (2,622); Valparaiso, IN |
| November 17, 2021*; 7:30 pm, P12N | | at Stanford | L 60–74 | 0–3 | Maples Pavilion (2,722); Stanford, CA |
| November 22, 2021*; 8:00 p.m. | | vs. Jacksonville State; Nassau Championship quarterfinal | W 78–70 | 1–3 | Baha Mar Convention Center; Nassau, Bahamas |
| November 23, 2021*; 7:00 p.m., FloHoops | | vs. Coastal Carolina; Nassau Championship semifinal | L 61–64 | 1–4 | Baha Mar Convention Center; Nassau, Bahamas |
| November 24, 2021*; 4:30 p.m., FloHoops | | vs. Tulane; Nassau Championship third place game | W 68–64 | 2–4 | Baha Mar Convention Center; Nassau, Bahamas |
| November 27, 2021*; 12:00 pm, ESPN3 | | Trinity Christian | W 106–69 | 3–4 | Athletics–Recreation Center (1,239); Valparaiso, IN |
| December 2, 2021; 8:00 pm, ESPNU | | at Drake | L 66–73 | 3–5 (0–1) | Knapp Center (2,560); Des Moines, IA |
| December 5, 2021*; 1:00 pm, ESPN3 | | at Western Michigan | W 71–60 | 4–5 | University Arena (1,883); Kalamazoo, MI |
| December 7, 2021*; 6:00 pm, ESPN+ | | East–West | W 101–58 | 5–5 | Athletics–Recreation Center (1,170); Valparaiso, IN |
| December 11, 2021*; 12:00 pm, ESPN+ | | Charlotte | L 67–68 | 5–6 | Athletics–Recreation Center (2,264); Valparaiso, IN |
| December 20, 2021*; 6:00 pm, ESPN3 | | Eastern Michigan | W 67–55 | 6–6 | Athletics–Recreation Center (1,293); Valparaiso, IN |
| December 22, 2021*; 12:00 pm, ESPN3 | | William & Mary | W 88–66 | 7–6 | Athletics–Recreation Center (2,125); Valparaiso, IN |
| ~~December 28, 2021~~*; ~~12:00 pm~~, ESPN3 | | ~~Prairie View A&M~~ | Canceled due to COVID-19 | | Athletics–Recreation Center; Valparaiso, IN |
| January 2, 2022; 1:00 pm, ESPN+ | | Illinois State | W 81–76 ^{OT} | 8–6 (1–1) | Athletics–Recreation Center (1,267); Valparaiso, IN |
| January 5, 2022; 8:00 pm, NBCSCHI | | at Northern Iowa | L 65–92 | 8–7 (1–2) | McLeod Center (1,387); Cedar Falls, IA |
| January 8, 2022; 6:00 pm, ESPN+ | | Southern Illinois | L 60–63 | 8–8 (1–3) | Athletics–Recreation Center (1,321); Valparaiso, IN |
| January 11, 2022; 8:00 pm, CBSSN | | at Loyola–Chicago | L 74–81 ^{2OT} | 8–9 (1–4) | Joseph J. Gentile Arena (2,193); Chicago, IL |
| January 15, 2022; 4:00 pm, ESPNU | | Missouri State | L 57–74 | 8–10 (1–5) | Athletics–Recreation Center (1,621); Valparaiso, IN |
| January 19, 2022; 6:00 pm, ESPN+ | | Northern Iowa | W 83–80 ^{OT} | 9–10 (2–5) | Athletics–Recreation Center (1,414); Valparaiso, IN |
| January 22, 2022; 12:00 pm, ESPN+ | | at Indiana State | W 75–73 | 10–10 (3–5) | Hulman Center (2,846); Terre Haute, IN |
| January 26, 2022; 6:00 pm, ESPN+ | | Bradley | L 56–71 | 10–11 (3–6) | Athletics–Recreation Center (1,220); Valparaiso, IN |
| January 30, 2022; 4:00 pm, ESPN+ | | at Southern Illinois | L 55–77 | 10–12 (3–7) | Banterra Center (4,254); Carbondale, IL |
| February 5, 2022; 6:00 pm, ESPN+ | | Indiana State | W 79–72 ^{2OT} | 11–12 (4–7) | Athletics–Recreation Center (1,908); Valparaiso, IN |
| February 9, 2022; 7:00 pm, Marquee/ESPN+ | | at Illinois State | L 75–78 ^{OT} | 11–13 (4–8) | Redbird Arena (2,443); Normal, IL |
| February 12, 2022; 3:00 pm, NBCSCHI | | at Missouri State | L 66–84 | 11–14 (4–9) | JQH Arena (4,314); Springfield, MO |
| February 16, 2022; 7:00 pm, NBCSCHI+ | | Loyola–Chicago | L 69–71 | 11–15 (4–10) | Athletics–Recreation Center (2,208); Valparaiso, IN |
| February 19, 2022; 1:00 pm, ESPN+ | | at Evansville | W 72–56 | 12–15 (5–10) | Ford Center (2,947); Evansville, IN |
| February 21, 2022; 7:00 pm, ESPN+ | | Evansville | W 74–69 | 13–15 (6–10) | Athletics–Recreation Center (1,107); Valparaiso, IN |
| February 23, 2022; 6:00 pm, ESPN+ | | Drake | L 65–71 | 13–16 (6–11) | Athletics–Recreation Center (2,530); Valparaiso, IN |
| February 26, 2022; 7:00 pm, ESPN+ | | at Bradley | L 55–79 | 13–17 (6–12) | Peoria Civic Center (5,660); Peoria, IL |
MVC tournament
| March 3, 2022; 8:30 pm, MVC TV | (7) | vs. (10) Evansville; Opening round | W 81–59 | 14–17 | Enterprise Center (2,904); St. Louis, MO |
| March 4, 2022; 6:00 pm, MVC TV | (7) | vs. (2) Missouri State; Quarterfinals | L 58–67 | 14–18 | Enterprise Center; St. Louis, MO |
*Non-conference game. ^{#}Rankings from AP Poll. (#) Tournament seedings in parentheses. All times are in Central Time.
