= 2021–22 Loyola Ramblers men's basketball team =

American college basketball season

2021–22 Loyola Ramblers men's basketball

Missouri Valley Tournament champions

NCAA tournament, First Round
- Conference: Missouri Valley Conference
- Record: 25–8 (13–5 MVC)
- Head coach: Drew Valentine (1st season)
- Associate head coach: Dan Hipsher
- Assistant coaches: Amorrow Morgan; Sean Dwyer; Patrick Wallace
- Home arena: Joseph J. Gentile Arena

2021–22 Missouri Valley Conference men's basketball standings
	Conf.				Overall
Team	W		L	PCT	W		L	PCT
Northern Iowa	14	–	4	.778	20	–	12	.625
Missouri State	13	–	5	.722	23	–	11	.676
Drake	13	–	5	.722	25	–	11	.694
Loyola Chicago †	13	–	5	.722	25	–	8	.758
Bradley	11	–	7	.611	17	–	14	.548
Southern Illinois	9	–	9	.500	16	–	14	.533
Valparaiso	6	–	12	.333	14	–	18	.438
Illinois State	5	–	13	.278	13	–	20	.394
Indiana State	4	–	14	.222	11	–	20	.355
Evansville	2	–	16	.111	6	–	24	.200
† 2022 MVC tournament winner

The 2021–22 Loyola Ramblers men's basketball team represented Loyola University Chicago during the 2021–22 NCAA Division I men's basketball season. The Ramblers, led by first-year head coach Drew Valentine, played their home games at the Joseph J. Gentile Arena in Chicago, Illinois as members of the Missouri Valley Conference (MVC). They finished the regular season 25–7 overall and 13–5 in MVC play, tying for second place in the conference standings.

As the No. 4 seed in the MVC tournament, they defeated Bradley, Northern Iowa, and Drake to win the MVC Tournament for the second consecutive season. With this victory, they secured the conference's automatic bid to the NCAA tournament as the No. 10 seed, where they lost in the first round to Ohio State.

On November 16, 2021, Loyola announced that the 2021–22 season would be its final season in the MVC, as the program would join the Atlantic 10 Conference in July 2022.

== Previous season ==
During a season affected by the ongoing COVID-19 pandemic, the Ramblers finished the 2020–21 season with a 26–5 overall record and a 16–2 mark in MVC play, securing the regular season championship. In the MVC tournament, they defeated Southern Illinois, Illinois State, and Drake to claim the conference tournament title. As a result, they earned the conference’s automatic bid to the NCAA tournament as a No. 8 seed in the Midwest Region.

In the first round, they defeated No. 9-seeded Georgia Tech. In the second round, they upset No. 1-seeded Illinois to advance to the Sweet Sixteen. However, their tournament run ended in the Sweet Sixteen, where they lost to Oregon State.

On April 3, 2021, head coach Porter Moser left Loyola to accept the head coaching position at Oklahoma. Shortly after, Loyola announced that assistant coach Drew Valentine would be promoted to head coach.

== Offseason ==
=== Coaching changes ===
On April 20, Drew Valentine announced the hiring of assistant coaches Amorrow Morgan, Sean Dwyer, and Patrick Wallace. Former Oakland associate head coach Dan Hipsher was also named special assistant to the head coach.

=== Departures ===
Due to COVID-19 disruptions, the NCAA did not count the 2020–21 season against the eligibility of any basketball player, meaning that all seniors in that season could choose to return for 2021–22.

Name	Number	Pos.	Height	Weight	Year	Hometown	Reason for departure
Paxson Wojcik	0	G	6'4"	185	Sophomore	Charleston, SC	Transferred to Brown
Jake Baughman	2	G	6'3"	180	RS Senior	Bloomington, IL	Graduated; chose not to return
Baylor Hebb	13	G	6'2"	170	Freshman	Colleyville, TX	Transferred to Colorado State
Cooper Kaifes	23	G	6'3"	195	RS Sophomore	Shawnee, KS	Transferred to Samford
Cameron Krutwig	25	C	6'9"	255	Senior	Algonquin, IL	Graduated; signed to play professionally in Belgium with the Antwerp Giants
Sami Ismail	31	G	6'1"	182	Junior	Orland Park, IL	Transferred to Highland CC (IL)
Franklin Agunanne	33	F	6'9"	245	Junior	Abuja, Nigeria	Transferred to SMU

=== Incoming transfers ===
Name	Number	Pos.	Height	Weight	Year	Hometown	Previous School
Ryan Schwieger	13	F	6'7"	205	Senior	Matthews, NC	Transferred from Princeton
Chris Knight	23	F	6'7"	225	Senior	Madison, WI	Transferred from Dartmouth

=== 2021 recruiting class ===
College recruiting information
Name	Hometown	School	Height	Weight	Commit date
Ty Johnson; G	Chicago, IL	DePaul College Prep (IL)	6 ft 3 in (1.91 m)	180 lb (82 kg)	Nov 11, 2020
Ty Johnson; G	Recruit ratings: No ratings found				
Ben Schwieger; G / F	Aurora, IL	Waubonsie Valley (IL)	6 ft 6 in (1.98 m)	185 lb (84 kg)	Nov 11, 2020
Ben Schwieger; G / F	Recruit ratings: No ratings found				
Saint Thomas; F	Omaha, NE	Millard North (NE)	6 ft 7 in (2.01 m)	200 lb (91 kg)	Apr 13, 2021
Saint Thomas; F	Recruit ratings: Rivals: 247Sports: ESPN: (N/R)				
Overall recruit ranking: 247Sports: 132
Note: In many cases, Scout, Rivals, 247Sports, On3, and ESPN may conflict in their listings of height and weight.; In these cases, the average was taken. ESPN grades are on a 100-point scale.; Sources: "2021 Loyola Ramblers Recruiting Class". ESPN.; "2021 Team Ranking". Rivals.

== Roster ==
2021–22 Loyola Ramblers men's basketball team
Players
Coaches

Pos.	#	Name	Height	Weight	Year	Previous school	Hometown
F	0	Saint Thomas	6 ft 7 in (2.01 m)	200 lb (91 kg)	Fr	Millard North	Omaha, NE
G	1	Lucas Williamson	6 ft 4 in (1.93 m)	205 lb (93 kg)	GS	Whitney Young	Chicago, IL
G	2	Ty Johnson	6 ft 3 in (1.91 m)	180 lb (82 kg)	Fr	DePaul College Prep	Chicago, IL
G	4	Braden Norris	6 ft 0 in (1.83 m)	180 lb (82 kg)	RS Jr	Hilliard Bradley; Oakland	Hilliard, OH
G	5	Keith Clemons	6 ft 1 in (1.85 m)	180 lb (82 kg)	GS	Wesley Christian; Vincennes	Norcross, GA
F	10	Tom Welch	6 ft 8 in (2.03 m)	220 lb (100 kg)	Jr	Naperville North	Naperville, IL
G	12	Marquise Kennedy	6 ft 1 in (1.85 m)	175 lb (79 kg)	Jr	Brother Rice	Chicago, IL
F	13	Ryan Schwieger	6 ft 7 in (2.01 m)	205 lb (93 kg)	Sr	Wedington; Princeton	Matthews, NC
C	22	Jacob Hutson	6 ft 10 in (2.08 m)	240 lb (109 kg)	So	Edina	Edina, MN
F	23	Chris Knight	6 ft 7 in (2.01 m)	225 lb (102 kg)	Sr	James Madison Memorial; Dartmouth	Madison, WI
G/F	24	Tate Hall	6 ft 6 in (1.98 m)	220 lb (100 kg)	GS	Greenfield-Central; Indianapolis	Greenfield, IN
F	30	Aher Uguak	6 ft 7 in (2.01 m)	225 lb (102 kg)	GS	Harry Ainlay; New Mexico	Edmonton, AB
G	31	Will Smythe (W)	6 ft 4 in (1.93 m)	170 lb (77 kg)	Fr	St. Mary's Prep	Rochester Hills, MI
G/F	33	Ben Schwieger	6 ft 6 in (1.98 m)	185 lb (84 kg)	Fr	Waubonsie Valley	Aurora, IL
F	35	Damezi Anderson	6 ft 7 in (2.01 m)	225 lb (102 kg)	Sr	Riley; Indiana	South Bend, IN
F	45	Will Alcock (W)	6 ft 7 in (2.01 m)	215 lb (98 kg)	Sr	Zionsville Community	Zionsville, IN

Head coach

- Drew Valentine (Oakland)

Assistant coach(es)

- Amorrow Morgan (Idaho State)
- Sean Dwyer (Michigan State)
- Patrick Wallace (Charleston Southern)

Legend

- (C) Team captain
- (S) Suspended
- (I) Ineligible
- (W) Walk-on
- Injured
- Current redshirt

Roster

== Schedule and results ==
After losing several game to cancellations and postponements due to COVID-19, Loyola and San Francisco agreed to play a game on January 6, 2022, on the campus of Salt Lake Community College.

Date time, TV	Rank^{#}	Opponent^{#}	Result	Record	Site (attendance) city, state
Exhibition
November 3, 2021*; 7:00 p.m.		UW–Stout	W 93–41		Gentile Arena (2,374); Chicago, IL
Regular season
November 9, 2021*; 7:00 p.m., NBCSC+		Coppin State	W 103–45	1–0	Gentile Arena (2,982); Chicago, IL
November 13, 2021*; 1:00 p.m., ESPN+/NBCSC		Florida Gulf Coast	W 89–77	2–0	Gentile Arena (3,277); Chicago, IL
November 16, 2021*; 7:00 p.m., NBCSC		Chicago State	W 92–56	3–0	Gentile Arena (2,637); Chicago, IL
November 20, 2021*; 3:00 p.m., NBCSC		UIC	W 80–63	4–0	Gentile Arena (3,732); Chicago, IL
November 24, 2021*; 11:00 a.m., ESPN		Michigan State; Battle 4 Atlantis quarterfinals	L 61–63	4–1	Imperial Arena; Nassau, Bahamas
November 25, 2021*; 1:30 p.m., ESPN2		No. 19 Auburn; Battle 4 Atlantis consolation round	L 53–62	4–2	Imperial Arena (804); Nassau, Bahamas
November 26, 2021*; 6:00 p.m., ESPNews		Arizona State; Battle 4 Atlantis 7th Place Game	W 77–59	5–2	Imperial Arena (739); Nassau, Bahamas
December 1, 2021; 7:00 p.m., NBCSC		Indiana State	W 88–76	6–2 (1–0)	Gentile Arena (2,915); Chicago, IL
December 4, 2021*; 3:00 p.m., FS1		at DePaul	W 68–64	7–2	Wintrust Arena (6,774); Chicago, IL
December 7, 2021*; 7:00 p.m., ESPN3		Roosevelt	W 88–49	8–2	Gentile Arena (2,379); Chicago, IL
December 10, 2021*; 7:00 p.m., SECN+		at Vanderbilt	W 69–58	9–2	Memorial Gymnasium (7,002); Nashville, TN
December 19, 2021*; 1:00 p.m., ESPN3/ESPN+		Norfolk State	Canceled due to COVID-19 issues		Gentile Arena; Chicago, IL
December 22, 2021*; 1:00 p.m., ESPN+		at Davidson	Canceled due to COVID-19 issues		John M. Belk Arena; Davidson, NC
January 2, 2021*; 1:00 p.m., ESPN3		Saint Xavier	Canceled due to COVID-19 issues		Gentile Arena; Chicago, IL
January 6, 2022*; 1:00 p.m., WCC Network		vs. San Francisco	W 79–74	10–2	Lifetime Activities Center (112); Salt Lake City, UT
January 8, 2022; 3:00 p.m., NBCSC		Bradley	W 78–71 ^{OT}	11–2 (2–0)	Gentile Arena (3,092); Chicago, IL
January 11, 2022; 8:00 p.m., CBSSN		Valparaiso	W 81–74 ^{2OT}	12–2 (3–0)	Gentile Arena (2,193); Chicago, IL
January 15, 2022; 6:00 p.m., CBSSN		at Indiana State	W 64–56	13–2 (4–0)	Hulman Center (3,614); Terre Haute, IN
January 18, 2022; 7:00 p.m., NBCSC+	No. 22	at Evansville	W 77–48	14–2 (5–0)	Ford Center (3,190); Evansville, IN
January 22, 2022; 2:30 p.m., CBSSN	No. 22	Missouri State	L 69–79	14–3 (5–1)	Gentile Arena (4,105); Chicago, IL
January 25, 2022; 7:00 p.m., NBCSC		Southern Illinois	W 59–47	15–3 (6–1)	Gentile Arena (2,941); Chicago, IL
January 27, 2022; 7:00 p.m., NBCSC		at Southern Illinois	W 44–39	16–3 (7–1)	Banterra Center (4,315); Carbondale, IL
January 30, 2022; 1:00 p.m., ESPN2		at Drake	L 68–77	16–4 (7–2)	Knapp Center (3,994); Des Moines, IA
February 2, 2022; 7:00 p.m., ESPN+		Illinois State	W 78–64	17–4 (8–2)	Gentile Arena (3,097); Chicago, IL
February 6, 2022; 1:00 p.m., ESPN2		at Missouri State	W 71–62	18–4 (9–2)	JQH Arena (6,117); Springfield, MO
February 9, 2022; 8:00 p.m., CBSSN		at Bradley	L 61–68	18–5 (9–3)	Peoria Civic Center (4,450); Peoria, IL
February 13, 2022; 3:00 p.m., ESPN2		Northern Iowa	W 85–58	19–5 (10–3)	Gentile Arena (4,019); Chicago, IL
February 16, 2022; 7:00 p.m., NBCSC+		at Valparaiso	W 71–69	20–5 (11–3)	Athletics–Recreation Center (2,208); Valparaiso, IN
February 19, 2022; 5:00 p.m., ESPN2		Drake	L 76–83	20–6 (11–4)	Gentile Arena (4,557); Chicago, IL
February 21, 2022; 7:00 p.m., NBCSC		at Illinois State; Rescheduled from January 5	W 59–50	21–6 (12–4)	Redbird Arena (3,354); Normal, IL
February 23, 2022; 7:00 p.m., NBCSC		Evansville	W 82–31	22–6 (13–4)	Gentile Arena (3,843); Chicago, IL
February 26, 2022; 5:00 p.m., ESPNU		at Northern Iowa	L 96–102 ^{OT}	22–7 (13–5)	McLeod Center (6,497); Cedar Falls, IA
MVC tournament
March 4, 2022; 2:30 pm, MVC TV	(4)	vs. (5) Bradley; Quarterfinals	W 66–50	23–7	Enterprise Center (5,394); St. Louis, MO
March 5, 2022; 2:30 pm, CBSSN	(4)	vs. (1) Northern Iowa; Semifinals	W 66–43	24–7	Enterprise Center; St. Louis, MO
March 6, 2022; 1:00 pm, CBS	(4)	vs. (3) Drake; Championship	W 64–58	25–7	Enterprise Center (5,164); St. Louis, MO
NCAA tournament
March 18, 2022; 11:15 am, CBS	(10 S)	vs. (7 S) Ohio State; First Round	L 41–54	25–8	PPG Paints Arena; Pittsburgh, PA
*Non-conference game. ^{#}Rankings from AP Poll. (#) Tournament seedings in parentheses. All times are in Central Time.

== Rankings ==
Ranking movements Legend: ██ Increase in ranking ██ Decrease in ranking — = Not ranked RV = Received votes
	Week																			
Poll	Pre	1	2	3	4	5	6	7	8	9	10	11	12	13	14	15	16	17	18	Final
AP	—	RV	RV	RV	RV	RV	RV	RV	RV	RV	22	RV	RV	RV	—	—	—	RV	RV	Not released
Coaches	RV	RV^	RV	—	RV	RV	RV	RV	RV	RV	24	RV	—	RV	RV	—	—	RV	RV	

*AP does not release post-NCAA Tournament rankings.
^Coaches did not release a Week 1 poll.
