= 2021–22 Indiana State Sycamores men's basketball team =

American college basketball season

2021–22 Indiana State Sycamores men's basketball
- Conference: Missouri Valley Conference
- Record: 11–20 (4–14 MVC)
- Head coach: Josh Schertz (1st season)
- Associate head coach: Matthew Graves
- Assistant coaches: Zak Boisvert; Bryston Williams
- Home arena: Hulman Center

2021–22 Missouri Valley Conference men's basketball standings
	Conf.				Overall
Team	W		L	PCT	W		L	PCT
Northern Iowa	14	–	4	.778	20	–	12	.625
Missouri State	13	–	5	.722	23	–	11	.676
Drake	13	–	5	.722	25	–	11	.694
Loyola Chicago †	13	–	5	.722	25	–	8	.758
Bradley	11	–	7	.611	17	–	14	.548
Southern Illinois	9	–	9	.500	16	–	14	.533
Valparaiso	6	–	12	.333	14	–	18	.438
Illinois State	5	–	13	.278	13	–	20	.394
Indiana State	4	–	14	.222	11	–	20	.355
Evansville	2	–	16	.111	6	–	24	.200
† 2022 MVC tournament winner

The 2021–22 Indiana State Sycamores men's basketball team represented Indiana State University in the 2021–22 NCAA Division I men's basketball season. The Sycamores, led by first-year head coach Josh Schertz, played their home games at the Hulman Center in Terre Haute, Indiana as members of the Missouri Valley Conference.

== Previous season ==
In a season limited due to the ongoing COVID-19 pandemic, the Sycamores finished the 2020–21 season 15–10, 11–7 in MVC play to finish in fourth place. They defeated Evansville in the quarterfinals of the MVC tournament before losing to Loyola in the semifinals.

== Offseason ==
=== Coaching changes ===
On March 7, 2021, Indiana State announced that head coach Greg Lansing's contract would not be renewed, thereby ending his 11-year tenure at the school. On March 17, the Sycamores hired Josh Schertz, former head coach at Division II Lincoln Memorial, as Lansing's replacement.

== Roster ==
2021–22 Indiana State Sycamores men's basketball team
Players
Coaches

Pos.	#	Name	Height	Weight	Year	Previous school	Hometown
G	0	Xavier Bledson	6 ft 6 in (1.98 m)	215 lb (98 kg)	RS So	Lincoln Memorial	Gainesville, Georgia
G	1	Julian Larry	6 ft 3 in (1.91 m)	185 lb (84 kg)	Fr	iSchool Entrepreneurial Academy	Frisco, Texas
G	2	Quimari Peterson	6 ft 1 in (1.85 m)	175 lb (79 kg)	Fr	West Side Leadership Academy	Gary, Indiana
F	3	Kailex Stephens	6 ft 7 in (2.01 m)	214 lb (97 kg)	Jr	Tallahassee Community College	Tuscaloosa, Alabama
G	4	Cooper Neese	6 ft 4 in (1.93 m)	185 lb (84 kg)	Jr	Cloverdale High School	Cloverdale, Indiana
G	5	Cameron Crawford	6 ft 5 in (1.96 m)	175 lb (79 kg)	Fr	Spain Park High School	Hoover, Alabama
G	11	Tyreke Key (injured)	6 ft 3 in (1.91 m)	205 lb (93 kg)	Sr	Clay County High School (TN)	Celina, Tennessee
G	12	Micah Thomas	6 ft 0 in (1.83 m)	175 lb (79 kg)	Fr	Northwest Florida State College	Oklahoma City, Oklahoma
G	13	Sam Mervis	5 ft 11 in (1.8 m)	172 lb (78 kg)	Fr	University High School	Indianapolis, Indiana
F	14	Simon Wilbar	6 ft 11 in (2.11 m)	235 lb (107 kg)	RS Fr	Lincoln Memorial	Fort Myers, Florida
G	15	Cameron Henry	6 ft 6 in (1.98 m)	210 lb (95 kg)	RS Jr	Lincoln Memorial	Chesterfield, Virginia
G	24	Zach Hobbs	6 ft 5 in (1.96 m)	190 lb (86 kg)	So	Des Moines Area Community College	Mesa, Arizona
F	35	Dearon Tucker	6 ft 10 in (2.08 m)	240 lb (109 kg)	So	Oregon State	Dallas, Texas
C	50	Nick Hittle	6 ft 10 in (2.08 m)	245 lb (111 kg)	Fr	Culver Academies	Indianapolis, Indiana

Head coach

- Josh Schertz (Florida Atlantic)

Assistant coach(es)

- Matthew Graves (Butler)
- Zak Boisvert (Fordham)
- Bryston Williams (Northwest Missouri State)

Legend

- (C) Team captain
- (S) Suspended
- (I) Ineligible
- (W) Walk-on
- Injured
- Current redshirt

Roster
Last update: November 20, 2021

== Schedule and results ==
Date time, TV	Rank^{#}	Opponent^{#}	Result	Record	Site (attendance) city, state
Exhibition
November 4, 2021*; 7:00 p.m.		Rose–Hulman	W 82–70		Hulman Center (4,500); Terre Haute, IN
Regular season
November 9, 2021*; 8:00 p.m., ESPN+		at Green Bay	W 81–77	1–0	Kress Events Center (1,834); Green Bay, WI
November 12, 2021*; 1:00 p.m., BTN		at No. 7 Purdue	L 67–92	1–1	Mackey Arena (14,804); West Lafayette, IN
November 14, 2021*; 1:00 p.m., ESPN3		Hanover	W 90–49	2–1	Hulman Center (3,000); Terre Haute, IN
November 18, 2021*; 9:00 p.m., ESPNU		vs. Old Dominion; Myrtle Beach Invitational Quarterfinals	W 77–36	3–1	HTC Center (1,237); Conway, SC
November 19, 2021*; 5:00 p.m., ESPN2		vs. Oklahoma; Myrtle Beach Invitational Semifinals	L 63–87	3–2	HTC Center (1,131); Conway, SC
November 21, 2021*; 8:30 p.m., ESPN2		vs. New Mexico State; Myrtle Beach Invitational 3rd Place Game	L 66–80	3–3	HTC Center (1,083); Conway, SC
November 27, 2021*; 1:00 p.m., ESPN3		at Ball State	L 75–97	3–4	Worthen Arena (3,017); Muncie, IN
December 1, 2021; 8:00 p.m., ESPN+		at Loyola–Chicago	L 76–88	3–5 (0–1)	Joseph J. Gentile Arena (2,915); Chicago, IL
December 4, 2021*; 1:00 p.m., ESPN3		Miami (OH)	W 69–68	4–5	Hulman Center (3,456); Terre Haute, IN
December 13, 2021*; 8:00 p.m., ESPN+		at North Dakota State	L 70–77	4–6	Scheels Center (1,434); Fargo, ND
December 18, 2021*; 1:00 p.m., ESPN3		Alabama A&M	W 67–43	5–6	Hulman Center (3,011); Terre Haute, IN
December 20, 2021*; 5:00 p.m., ESPN+		Oakland City	W 78–69	6–6	Hulman Center (2,391); Terre Haute, IN
~~December 22, 2021~~*; ~~8:00 p.m.~~, ~~ESPN3~~		at ~~Northern Illinois~~	Canceled due to COVID-19		~~Convocation Center~~; ~~DeKalb, IL~~
~~December 29, 2021~~*; ~~8:00 p.m.~~, ~~ESPN3~~		~~Coppin State~~	Canceled due to COVID-19		~~Hulman Center~~; ~~Terre Haute, IN~~
December 29, 2021*; 7:00 p.m., ESPN3		Midway	W 107–51	7–6	Hulman Center (2,405); Terre Haute, IN
January 2, 2022; 1:00 p.m., ESPN+		Bradley	W 76–71	8–6 (1–1)	Hulman Center (2,806); Terre Haute, IN
January 11, 2022; 8:00 p.m., ESPN+		at Northern Iowa	L 74–80 ^{OT}	8–7 (1–2)	McLeod Center (1,797); Cedar Falls, IA
January 15, 2022; 7:00 p.m., CBSSN		Loyola–Chicago	L 56–64	8–8 (1–3)	Hulman Center (3,614); Terre Haute, IN
January 19, 2022; 8:00 p.m., ESPN+		at Southern Illinois	L 55–63	8–9 (1–4)	Banterra Center (4,142); Carbondale, IL
January 22, 2022; 1:00 p.m., ESPN+		Valparaiso	L 73–75	8–10 (1–5)	Hulman Center (2,846); Terre Haute, IN
January 25, 2022; 7:00 p.m., ESPN+		Missouri State	W 76–72	9–10 (2–5)	Hulman Center (3,011); Terre Haute, IN
January 30, 2022; 2:00 p.m., ESPN+		at Bradley	L 52–67	9–11 (2–6)	Carver Arena (4,554); Peoria, IL
February 2, 2022; 7:00 p.m., ESPN+		Drake	L 67–85	9–12 (2–7)	Hulman Center (2,811); Terre Haute, IN
February 5, 2022; 7:00 p.m., ESPN+		at Valparaiso	L 72–79 ^{2OT}	9–13 (2–8)	Athletics–Recreation Center (1,908); Valparaiso, IN
February 8, 2022; 7:00 p.m., ESPN+		Evansville; Rescheduled from January 5	L 56–65	9–14 (2–9)	Hulman Center (2,567); Terre Haute, IN
February 10, 2022; 7:00 p.m., ESPN+		at Evansville	W 80–77 ^{2OT}	10–14 (3–9)	Ford Center (3,177); Evansville, IN
February 12, 2022; 1:00 p.m., ESPN+		Illinois State	W 60–57	11–14 (4–9)	Hulman Center (2,766); Terre Haute, IN
February 15, 2022; 8:00 p.m., ESPN+		at Missouri State	L 70–79	11–15 (4–10)	JQH Arena (3,522); Springfield, MO
February 19, 2022; 1:00 p.m., ESPN+		Southern Illinois	L 72–76	11–16 (4–11)	Hulman Center (3,486); Terre Haute, IN
February 21, 2022; 8:00 p.m., ESPN+		at Drake	L 58–74	11–17 (4–12)	Knapp Center (3,352); Des Moines, IA
February 23, 2022; 7:00 p.m., ESPN+		Northern Iowa	L 82–88	11–18 (4–13)	Hulman Center (3,684); Terre Haute, IN
February 26, 2022; 4:00 p.m., ESPN+		at Illinois State	L 66–86	11–19 (4–14)	Redbird Arena (3,665); Normal, IL
MVC Tournament
March 3, 2022; 7:00 p.m., MVC TV	(9)	vs. (8) Illinois State; Opening Round	L 53–58	11–20	Enterprise Center (0); St. Louis, MO
*Non-conference game. ^{#}Rankings from AP Poll. (#) Tournament seedings in parentheses. All times are in Eastern.
