= 2022 Missouri Valley Conference men's basketball tournament =

- Classification: Division I
- Season: 2021–22
- Teams: 10
- Site: Enterprise Center; St. Louis, Missouri
- Champions: Loyola Chicago (3rd title)
- Winning coach: Drew Valentine (1st title)
- MVP: Lucas Williamson (Loyola Chicago)
- Television: CBS/Paramount+, CBSSN, MVC TV

2021–22 Missouri Valley Conference men's basketball standings
	Conf.				Overall
Team	W		L	PCT	W		L	PCT
Northern Iowa	14	–	4	.778	20	–	12	.625
Missouri State	13	–	5	.722	23	–	11	.676
Drake	13	–	5	.722	25	–	11	.694
Loyola Chicago †	13	–	5	.722	25	–	8	.758
Bradley	11	–	7	.611	17	–	14	.548
Southern Illinois	9	–	9	.500	16	–	14	.533
Valparaiso	6	–	12	.333	14	–	18	.438
Illinois State	5	–	13	.278	13	–	20	.394
Indiana State	4	–	14	.222	11	–	20	.355
Evansville	2	–	16	.111	6	–	24	.200
† 2022 MVC tournament winner

The 2022 Missouri Valley Conference men's basketball tournament, popularly referred to as "Arch Madness", was a postseason men's basketball tournament that completed the 2021–22 season in the Missouri Valley Conference. The tournament was held at the Enterprise Center in St. Louis, Missouri, during March 3–6, 2022. The winner, the Loyola Ramblers, received the conference's automatic bid to the 2022 NCAA tournament.

== Seeds ==
Teams were seeded by conference record, with ties broken by the overall record in conference games played between the tied teams, then (if necessary) by comparison of records between the tying institutions versus the top team in the standings (and continuing from top to bottom of standings, as necessary, with the team having the better record against that team receiving the better seed). The top six seeds received opening–round byes.

Seed	School	Conference	Tiebreaker 1	Tiebreaker 2
1	Northern Iowa	14–4		
2	Missouri State	13–5	3–1 vs. Drake/ Loyola Chicago	
3	Drake	13–5	2–2 vs. Missouri State/ Loyola Chicago	2–0 vs. Loyola Chicago
4	Loyola Chicago	13–5	1–3 vs. Missouri State/ Drake	0–2 vs. Drake
5	Bradley	11–7		
6	Southern Illinois	9–9		
7	Valparaiso	6–12		
8	Illinois State	5–13		
9	Indiana State	4–14		
10	Evansville	2–16		

== Schedule ==
Game	Time *	Matchup	Score	Television
Opening Round – Thursday, March 3
1	6:00 pm	#8 Illinois State vs. #9 Indiana State	58–53	MVC TV
2	8:30 pm	#7 Valparaiso vs. #10 Evansville	81–59	MVC TV
Quarterfinals – Friday, March 4
3	12:00 pm	#1 Northern Iowa vs. #8 Illinois State	78–65	MVC TV
4	2:30 pm	#4 Loyola Chicago vs. #5 Bradley	66–50	MVC TV
5	6:00 pm	#2 Missouri State vs. #7 Valparaiso	67–58	MVC TV
6	8:30 pm	#3 Drake vs. #6 Southern Illinois	65–52	MVC TV
Semifinals – Saturday, March 5
7	2:30 pm	#1 Northern Iowa vs. #4 Loyola Chicago	43–66	CBSSN
8	5:00 pm	#2 Missouri State vs. #3 Drake	78–79 ^{OT}	CBSSN
Final – Sunday, March 6
9	1:00 pm	#4 Loyola Chicago vs. #3 Drake	64–58	CBS/ Paramount+
* Game times in CST; rankings denote tournament seed.

== Bracket ==
Opening Round; Thursday, March 3 MVC TV
8	Illinois State	58
9	Indiana State	53
7	Valparaiso	81
10	Evansville	59

Quarterfinals; Friday, March 4 MVC TV
1	Northern Iowa	78
8	Illinois State	65
4	Loyola Chicago	66
5	Bradley	50
2	Missouri State	67
7	Valparaiso	58
3	Drake	65
6	Southern Illinois	52

Semifinals; Saturday, March 5 CBSSN
1	Northern Iowa	43
4	Loyola Chicago	66
2	Missouri State	78 ^{OT}
3	Drake	79

Final; Sunday, March 6 CBS/Paramount+
4	Loyola Chicago	64
3	Drake	58
