= Nassau Championship =

Basketball Tournament

- Sport: College basketball
- Founded: 2017
- Owner: bdG Sports
- No. of teams: 8
- Country: The Bahamas
- Venues: Baha Mar Convention Center, Nassau, Bahamas
- Most recent champions: Men's UNC Greensboro (2023); Women's Michigan State (2025)
- Broadcaster: FloHoops.com
- Related competitions: Bahamas Championship
- Website: Bahamar Hoops

The Nassau Championship is an early season college basketball tournament, first held in 2017, designed strictly for mid-major NCAA Division I programs. The first two years were played at Kendal Isaacs National Gymnasium. in Nassau, Bahamas. The 2019 Tournament was moved to Baha Mar Convention Center due to damage Kendal Isaacs National Gymnasium suffered during Hurricane Dorian.

== Tournament history ==
=== Men's champions ===
Year	School
2017	Vermont
2018	Georgia Southern
2019	Liberty
2021	Toledo
2022	UNC Wilmington
2023	UNC Greensboro
2024	Non-bracketed event

=== Women's champions ===
Year	School
2025	Arkansas State (Goombay)
2025	Michigan State (Junkanoo)

== Brackets ==
=== 2024 ===
The 2024 Baha Mar Hoops Nassau Championship was a six-team non-bracketed event for mid-major teams. All games were streamed live on FloHoops.

November 29
Iona	62
Tarleton State	51

November 29
Arkansas State	86
Indiana State	81

November 29
Hofstra	68*
Rice	63

November 30
Indiana State	83
Iona	80

November 30
Tarleton State	61
Hofstra	59

November 30
Rice	75
Arkansas State	67

December 1
Iona	66
Rice	70

December 1
Hofstra	68
Arkansas State	66

Sunday, December 1
Indiana State	87
Tarleton State	71

=== 2023 ===
The following teams competed in the 2023 tournament:

5th Place Game; November 26
Brown	77
Ohio	82
7th Place Game
Kansas City	59
Middle Tennessee	63

Consolation 2nd Round; November 25
Kansas City	83
Brown	93*
Middle Tennessee	68
Ohio	80

First Round; November 24
UNC Greensboro	76
Kansas City	64
Brown	59
Delaware	67
Middle Tennessee	40
UIC	70
Ohio	94
George Washington	99**

Semifinals; November 25
UNC Greensboro	88
Delaware	77
UIC	89
George Washington	79

Championship; November 26
UNC Greensboro	58
UIC	57
3rd Place Game
Delaware	71
George Washington	81

* – Denotes overtime period

=== 2022 ===
5th Place Game; November 27
Ball State	65
San Jose State	67
7th Place Game
Missouri State	76
Oakland	64

Consolation 2nd Round; November 26
Ball State	67
Missouri State	64
San Jose State	80
Oakland	67

First Round; November 25
Vermont	78
Ball State	73
Missouri State	54
UNC Wilmington	68
North Texas	69
San Jose State	54
Oakland	70
Long Beach State	78

Semifinals; November 26
Vermont	66
UNC Wilmington	68
North Texas	68
Long Beach State	47

Championship; November 27
UNC Wilmington	55
North Texas	51
3rd Place Game
Vermont	58
Long Beach State	78

=== 2021 ===
- Abilene Christian had to withdraw from the Nassau Championship due to a COVID-19 issue on the ACU team. The tournament continued as planned with a seven team field (with no seventh place game), and the bottom half of the bracket was reseeded. Coastal Carolina received a first round bye.

5th Place Game; November 24
Drexel	64
Jacksonville State	72
~~Cancelled~~

Consolation 2nd Round; November 23
Charlotte	55
Drexel	67
Jacksonville State
BYE

First Round; November 22
Toledo	98
Charlotte	86
Drexel	87
Tulane	90
Valparaiso	78
Jacksonville State	70
Coastal Carolina
BYE

Semifinals; November 23
Toledo	68
Tulane	67
Valparaiso	61
Coastal Carolina	64

Championship; November 24
Toledo	79
Coastal Carolina	70
3rd Place Game
Tulane	64
Valparaiso	68

=== 2019 ===
5th Place Game; November 24
Milwaukee	63
George Washington	66
7th Place Game
Morgan State	112
Evansville	115***

Consolation 2nd Round; November 23
Morgan State	57
Milwaukee	62
Evansville	70
George Washington	78

First Round; November 22
Liberty	89
Morgan State	48
Rice	75
Milwaukee	69
Evansville	68
East Carolina	85
Kansas City	74
George Washington	68

Semifinals; November 23
Liberty	71
Rice	59
East Carolina	68
Kansas City	74

Championship; November 24
Liberty	62
Kansas City	49
3rd Place Game
Rice	77
East Carolina	69

=== 2018 ===
5th Place Game; November 18
Incarnate Word	68
Florida Atlantic	71
7th Place Game
North Dakota State	76
Towson	51

Consolation 2nd Round; November 17
Incarnate Word	80*
North Dakota State	78
Florida Atlantic	85
Towson	71

First Round; November 16
Montana	93
Incarnate Word	66
Miami (OH)	89
North Dakota State	78
Georgia Southern	80
Florida Atlantic	70
Towson	65
Pepperdine	74

Semifinals; November 17
Montana	73
Miami (OH)	71
Georgia Southern	88
Pepperdine	78

Championship; November 18
Montana	77
Georgia Southern	80
3rd Place Game
Miami (OH)	86
Pepperdine	80

=== 2017 ===
The field of eight teams that competed in the inaugural event was unveiled on 29 September 2017. The tournament began on 17 November and concluded on 19 November.

5th Place Game; November 19
Bradley	70
Weber State	64
7th Place Game
UTSA	90
James Madison	77

Consolation 2nd Round; November 18
Bradley	71
UTSA	69
James Madison	65
Weber State	73

First Round; November 17
Vermont	65
Bradley	64
Coastal Carolina	83
UTSA	69
Northern Kentucky	87
James Madison	78
Iona	80
Weber State	72

Semifinals; November 18
Vermont	80
Coastal Carolina	67
Northern Kentucky	87
Iona	78

Championship; November 19
Vermont	66
Northern Kentucky	64
3rd Place Game
Coastal Carolina	89
Iona	84
