= 2021–22 Missouri Valley Conference men's basketball season =

- League: NCAA Division I
- Sport: Basketball
- Teams: 10
- TV partner(s): CBS, CBSSN, FOX, FS1, FSN

Regular Season
- Regular season champions: Northern Iowa
- Season MVP: A. J. Green

Tournament
- Champions: Loyola–Chicago
- Runners-up: Drake

Basketball seasons
- ← 2020–21 2022–23 →

2021–22 Missouri Valley Conference men's basketball standings
	Conf.				Overall
Team	W		L	PCT	W		L	PCT
Northern Iowa	14	–	4	.778	20	–	12	.625
Missouri State	13	–	5	.722	23	–	11	.676
Drake	13	–	5	.722	25	–	11	.694
Loyola Chicago †	13	–	5	.722	25	–	8	.758
Bradley	11	–	7	.611	17	–	14	.548
Southern Illinois	9	–	9	.500	16	–	14	.533
Valparaiso	6	–	12	.333	14	–	18	.438
Illinois State	5	–	13	.278	13	–	20	.394
Indiana State	4	–	14	.222	11	–	20	.355
Evansville	2	–	16	.111	6	–	24	.200
† 2022 MVC tournament winner

The 2021–22 Missouri Valley Conference men's basketball season began with practices in October 2021, followed by the start of the 2021–22 NCAA Division I men's basketball season in November. Conference play began in January 2022 and ended in February.

With a win over Loyola Chicago on February 26, 2022, Northern Iowa clinched the regular season championship.

The MVC tournament was held March 3 through March 6, 2022 at Enterprise Center in St. Louis, Missouri. Loyola Chicago won the tournament championship for the second consecutive year, defeating Drake in the championship game.

Northern Iowa point guard A. J. Green was named the conference's player of the year. Northern Iowa coach Ben Jacobson was named conference coach of the year.

The season was the final season for Loyola Chicago in the conference as they joined the Atlantic 10 Conference on July 1, 2022.

== Preseason ==
=== Preseason poll ===
The preseason awards and coaches' poll was released by the league office on October 20, 2021.

Rank	Team
1.	Drake (29) 411
2.	Loyola Chicago (8) 363
3.	Northern Iowa (6) 354
4.	Missouri State 325
5.	Southern Illinois 228
6.	Bradley 171
7.	Valparaiso 151
8.	Evansville 141
9.	Indiana State 147
10.	Illinois State 68
(first place votes)

=== Preseason All-Missouri Valley teams ===
Honor	Recipient
Preseason Player of the Year	AJ Green, Northern Iowa
Preseason All-MVC First Team	AJ Green, Northern Iowa
Preseason All-MVC First Team	Tyrke Key, Indiana State
Preseason All-MVC First Team	Isiaih Mosley, Missouri State
Preseason All-MVC First Team	Roman Penn, Drake
Preseason All-MVC First Team	Gaige Prim, Missouri State
Preseason All-MVC Second Team	Marcus Domask, Southern Illinois
Preseason All-MVC Second Team	ShanQuan Hemphill, Drake
Preseason All-MVC Second Team	Ben Krikke, Valparaiso
Preseason All-MVC Second Team	Austin Phyfe, Northern Iowa
Preseason All-MVC Second Team	Lucas Williamson, Loyola Chicago
Preseason All-MVC Third Team	Shamar Givance, Evansville
Preseason All-MVC Third Team	Ja'Shon Henry, Bradley
Preseason All-MVC Third Team	Lance Jones, Southern Illinois
Preseason All-MVC Third Team	Rienk Mast, Bradley
Preseason All-MVC Third Team	Braden Norris, Loyola Chicago

== Regular season ==
=== Conference matrix ===
This table summarizes the head-to-head results between teams in conference play.

	Bradley	Drake	Evansville	Illinois State	Indiana State	Loyola Chicago	Missouri State	Northern Iowa	Southern Illinois	Valparaiso
vs BU	–	71–83; 59–68	47–79; 41–76	74–65; 64–72	76–71; 52–67	78–71 (OT); 61–68	71–69; 83–67	71–69; 65–78	62–70; 65–57	56–71; 55–79
vs DU	83–71; 68–59	–	59–60; 51–73	75–86; 88–89 (OT)	67–85; 58–74	68–77; 76–83	61–56; 66–62	74–82 (OT); 74–69 (OT)	59–60; 60–62	66–73; 65–71
vs UE	79–47; 76–41	60–59; 73–51	–	94–56; 53–56	56–65; 80–77 (2OT)	77–48; 82–31	72–58; 88–79	83–61; 64–59	54–52; 69–62	72–56; 74–69
vs IlSU	65–74; 72–64	86–75; 89–88 (OT)	56–94; 56–53	–	60–57; 66–86	78–64; 59–50	74–79 (OT); 88–63	79–64; 72–70	75–69; 90–69	81–76 (OT); 75–78 (OT)
vs InSU	71–76; 67–52	85–67; 74–58	65–56; 77–80 (2OT)	57–60; 86–66	–	88–76; 64–56	72–76; 79–70	80–74 (OT); 88–82	63–55; 76–72	75–73; 79–72 (2OT)
vs LU	71–78 (OT); 68–61	77–68; 83–76	48–77; 31–82	64–78; 50–59	76–88; 56–64	–	79–69; 62–71	58–85; 102–96 (OT)	47–59; 39–44	74–81 (2OT); 69–71
vs MSU	69–71; 67–83	56–61; 62–66	58–72; 79–88	79–74 (OT); 63–88	76–72; 70–79	69–79; 71–62	–	85–84; 95–75	76–81; 54–69	57–74; 66–84
vs UNI	69–71; 78–65	82–74 (OT); 69–74 (OT)	61–83; 59–64	64–79; 70–72	74–80 (OT); 82–88	85–58; 96–102 (OT)	84–85; 75–95	–	68–69; 44–53	65–92; 83–80 (OT)
vs SIU	70–62; 57–65	60–59; 62–60	52–54; 62–69	69–75; 69–90	55–63; 72–76	59–47; 44–39	81–76; 69–54	69–68; 53–44	–	60–63; 55–77
vs VU	71–56; 79–55	73–66; 71–65	56–72; 69–74	76–81 (OT); 78–75 (OT)	73–75; 72–79 (2OT)	81–74 (2OT); 71–69	74–57; 84–66	92–65; 80–83 (OT)	63–60; 77–55	–
Total	11–7	13–5	2–16	5–13	4–14	13–5	13–5	14–4	9–9	6–12

=== Player of the week ===
Every Monday, throughout the season, the Missouri Valley Conference named a player of the week and a newcomer of the week.

Date	Player of the week	Newcomer of the week
November 15, 2021	Antonio Reeves, Illinois State	Thomas Kithier, Valparaiso
November 22, 2021	Trae Berhow, Northern Iowa	Ryan Schwieger, Loyola
November 29, 2021	A. J. Green, Northern Iowa	Antoine Smith Jr., Evansville
December 6, 2021	Shamar Givance, Evansville	Terry Roberts, Bradley
December 13, 2021	Isiaih Mosley, Missouri State	Ben Coupet Jr., Southern Illinois
December 20, 2021	A. J. Green, Northern Iowa	Jaylen Minnett, Missouri State
December 27, 2021	Terry Roberts, Bradley	Terry Roberts, Bradley
January 3, 2022	Sy Chatman, Illinois State	Zach Hobbs, Indiana State
January 10, 2022	Isiaih Mosley, Missouri State	Ryan Schwieger, Loyola
January 17, 2022	Isiaih Mosley, Missouri State	Terry Roberts, Bradley
January 24, 2022	Isiaih Mosely, Missouri State	Terry Roberts, Bradley
January 31, 2022	Rienk Mast, Bradley	Tucker DeVries, Drake
February 7, 2022	Lucas Williamson, Loyola	Tucker DeVries, Drake
February 14, 2022	Cooper Neese, Indiana State	Mikey Howell, Bradley
February 21, 2022	A. J. Green, Northern Iowa	Tucker DeVries, Drake
February 28, 2022	Isiaih Mosley, Missouri State	Ben Coupet Jr., Southern Illinois

== Honors and awards ==
=== All-Conference awards and teams ===
The MVC announced its all-conference teams and major playing honors on March 1, 2022, and its Coach of the Year award two days later.

Honor	Recipient
Larry Bird Player of the Year	A. J. Green, Northern Iowa
Coach of the Year	Ben Jacobson, Northern Iowa
Defensive MVP	Lucas Williamson, Loyola Chicago
Sixth-Man of the Year	Bowen Born, Northern Iowa
Newcomer of the Year	Terry Roberts, Bradley
Freshman of the Year	Tucker DeVries, Drake
First Team
First Team	A. J. Green, Northern Iowa
First Team	Isiaih Mosley, Missouri State
First Team	Gaige Prim, Missouri State
First Team	Terry Roberts, Bradley
First Team	Lucas Williamson, Loyola Chicago
Second Team
Second Team	Noah Carter, Northern Iowa
Second Team	Tucker DeVries, Drake
Second Team	Marcus Domask, Southern Illinois
Second Team	Antonio Reeves, Illinois State
Second Team	Garrett Sturtz, Drake
Third Team
Third Team	Ben Krikke, Valparaiso
Third Team	Rienk Mast, Bradley
Third Team	Cooper Neese, Indiana State
Third Team	Braden Norris, Loyola Chicago
Third Team	Roman Penn, Drake

== Postseason ==
=== MVC Tournament ===
Opening Round; Thursday, March 3 MVC TV
8	Illinois State	58
9	Indiana State	53
7	Valparaiso	81
10	Evansville	59

Quarterfinals; Friday, March 4 MVC TV
1	Northern Iowa	78
8	Illinois State	65
4	Loyola Chicago	66
5	Bradley	50
2	Missouri State	67
7	Valparaiso	58
3	Drake	65
6	Southern Illinois	52

Semifinals; Saturday, March 5 CBSSN
1	Northern Iowa	43
4	Loyola Chicago	66
2	Missouri State	78
3	Drake	79*

Final; Sunday, March 6 CBS/Paramount+
4	Loyola Chicago	64
3	Drake	58

=== NCAA Tournament ===
The winner of the MVC tournament, Loyola Chicago, received the conference's automatic bid to the NCAA Tournament. No other team received a bid to the tournament.

Seed	Region	School	First Four	First Round	Second Round	Sweet Sixteen	Elite Eight	Final Four	Championship
10	South	Loyola	N/A	lost to (7) Ohio State 41–54					
		W–L (%):	0–1 (.000)	0–0 (–)	0–0 (–)	0–0 (–)	0–0 (–)	0–0 (–)	0–0 (–) Total: 0–1 (.000)

=== National Invitation Tournament ===
Northern Iowa, having one the regular season conference, but failing to win its conference tournament, received an automatic bid to the NIT. Missouri State received an at-large bid as well.

School	First round	Second Round	Quarterfinal	Semifinal	Championship
Northern Iowa	defeated (3) Saint Louis 80–68	lost to (2) BYU 71–90			
Missouri State	lost to (1) Oklahoma 72–89				
W–L (%):	1–1 (.500)	0–1 (.000)	0–0 (–)	0–0 (–)	0–0 (–) Total: 1–2 (.333)

=== College Basketball Invitational ===
Drake received an invite to the CBI tournament as the No. 1 overall seed.

Seed	School	First round	Quarterfinals	Semifinals	Championship
1	Drake	defeated (16) Purdue Fort Wayne 87–65	lost to (9) UNC Wilmington 75–76		
W–L (%):	1–0 (1.000)	0–1 (.000)	0–0 (–)	0–0 (–) Total: 1–1 (.500)	
