= 2021–22 Evansville Purple Aces men's basketball team =

American college basketball season

2021–22 Evansville Purple Aces men's basketball
- Conference: Missouri Valley Conference
- Record: 6–24 (2–16 MVC)
- Head coach: Todd Lickliter (2nd season)
- Assistant coaches: Logan Baumann; Thomas Jackson; Brandon Crone
- Home arena: Ford Center

2021–22 Missouri Valley Conference men's basketball standings
	Conf.				Overall
Team	W		L	PCT	W		L	PCT
Northern Iowa	14	–	4	.778	20	–	12	.625
Missouri State	13	–	5	.722	23	–	11	.676
Drake	13	–	5	.722	25	–	11	.694
Loyola Chicago †	13	–	5	.722	25	–	8	.758
Bradley	11	–	7	.611	17	–	14	.548
Southern Illinois	9	–	9	.500	16	–	14	.533
Valparaiso	6	–	12	.333	14	–	18	.438
Illinois State	5	–	13	.278	13	–	20	.394
Indiana State	4	–	14	.222	11	–	20	.355
Evansville	2	–	16	.111	6	–	24	.200
† 2022 MVC tournament winner

The 2021–22 Evansville Purple Aces men's basketball team represented the University of Evansville in the 2021–22 NCAA Division I men's basketball season. The Purple Aces were led by head coach Todd Lickliter in his second full season at Evansville and played their home games at the Ford Center in Evansville, Indiana as members of the Missouri Valley Conference (MVC). They finished the season 6–24, 2–16 in MVC play, to finish in last place. They lost to Valparaiso in the first round of the MVC tournament.

== Previous season ==
In a season limited due to the ongoing COVID-19 pandemic, the Purple Aces finished the 2020–21 season 9–16, 7–11 in MVC play, to finish in a three-way tie for fifth place. As the No. 5 seed in the MVC tournament, they lost to Indiana State in the quarterfinals.

== Roster ==
2021–22 Evansville Purple Aces men's basketball team
Players
Coaches

Pos.	#	Name	Height	Weight	Year	Previous school	Hometown
G	0	Gage Bobe	6 ft 0 in (1.83 m)	175 lb (79 kg)	Jr	South Knox	Vincennes, IN
F	2	Blake Sisley	6 ft 8 in (2.03 m)	215 lb (98 kg)	Fr	Heritage Hills	Santa Claus, IN
G	3	Jawaun Newton	6 ft 3 in (1.91 m)	180 lb (82 kg)	Sr	Burges	El Paso, TX
G	4	Troy Boynton	6 ft 4 in (1.93 m)	175 lb (79 kg)	Fr	Baylor Prep	Fort Lauderdale, FL
G	5	Shamar Givance	5 ft 10 in (1.78 m)	170 lb (77 kg)	Sr	First Love Christian Academy	Toronto, ON
F	10	Evan Kuhlman	6 ft 8 in (2.03 m)	215 lb (98 kg)	Sr	Lakota East	Liberty Township, OH
G	11	Emmette Page	6 ft 2 in (1.88 m)	180 lb (82 kg)	Sr	Osseo; Northeast CC	Brooklyn Park, MN
G	13	Blaise Beauchamp	6 ft 3 in (1.91 m)	165 lb (75 kg)	So	Bella Vista; Lincoln Trail College	Minnetonka, MN
G	15	Grant Tichenor	6 ft 1 in (1.85 m)	175 lb (79 kg)	Fr	Ohio County	Hartford, KY
F	24	Preston Phillips	6 ft 8 in (2.03 m)	190 lb (86 kg)	Fr	Don Bosco Institute	Elkhart, IN
G	30	Noah Frederking	6 ft 4 in (1.93 m)	205 lb (93 kg)	Sr	Okawville	Okawville, IL
F	31	Iyen Enaruna	6 ft 9 in (2.06 m)	220 lb (100 kg)	Sr	Cloud County CC	Amsterdam, Netherlands
F	34	Antoine Jr. Smith	6 ft 7 in (2.01 m)	215 lb (98 kg)	Jr	Don Bosco Institute; Collin College	Westerville, OH
F	44	Trey Hall	6 ft 9 in (2.06 m)	200 lb (91 kg)	So	Link Year Prep	Willimantic, CT

Head coach

- Todd Lickliter (Butler)

Assistant coach(es)

- Logan Baumann (Louisville)
- Thomas Jackson (Butler)
- Brandon Crone (Butler)

Legend

- (C) Team captain
- (S) Suspended
- (I) Ineligible
- (W) Walk-on
- Injured
- Current redshirt

Roster
Last update: August 27, 2024

== Schedule and results ==
Date time, TV	Rank^{#}	Opponent^{#}	Result	Record	Site city, state
Exhibition
October 30, 2021*; 1:00 p.m.		Mount St. Joseph	W 74–45		Ford Center (3,159); Evansville, IN
November 4, 2021*; 6:00 p.m.		Kentucky Wesleyan	W 74–64		Ford Center (2,915); Evansville, IN
Regular season
November 9, 2021*; 6:00 p.m., ESPN+		at Cincinnati	L 43–65	0–1	Fifth Third Arena (10,024); Cincinnati, OH
November 11, 2021*; 6:00 p.m., ESPN3		IUPUI	W 60–40	1–1	Ford Center (3,145); Evansville, IN
November 13, 2021*; 4:00 p.m., ESPN+		at Belmont	L 43–81	1–2	Curb Event Center (2,421); Nashville, TN
November 16, 2021*; 6:00 p.m., ESPN3		DePauw	W 69–58	2–2	Ford Center (2,894); Evansville, IN
November 20, 2021*; 1:00 p.m., ESPN+		UCF	L 59–75	2–3	Ford Center (3,233); Evansville, IN
November 22, 2021*; 10:00 a.m., FloHoops		vs. Rice; Gulf Coast Showcase first round	L 104–109 ^{3OT}	2–4	Hertz Arena; Estero, FL
November 23, 2021*; 11:00 a.m., FloHoops		vs. Vermont; Gulf Coast Showcase Consolation 2nd round	L 49–58	2–5	Hertz Arena; Estero, FL
November 24, 2021*; 10:00 a.m., FloHoops		vs. Akron; Gulf Coast Showcase 7th-place game	L 60–69	2–6	Hertz Arena; Estero, FL
November 28, 2021*; 1:00 p.m., ESPN+		at Eastern Illinois	W 70–54	3–6	Lantz Arena (1,011); Charleston, IL
December 1, 2021; 6:00 p.m., ESPN3		Southern Illinois	L 52–54	3–7 (0–1)	Ford Center (3,318); Evansville, IN
December 4, 2021*; 1:00 p.m., ESPN3		Tennessee Tech	W 59–51	4–7	Ford Center (3,275); Evansville, IN
December 8, 2021*; 6:30 p.m., ESPN+		at Southeast Missouri State	L 73–75	4–8	Show Me Center (690); Cape Girardeau, MO
December 18, 2021*; 4:00 p.m., ESPN3		UT Martin	Canceled due to COVID-19		Ford Center; Evansville, IN
December 21, 2021*; 6:00 p.m., ESPN+		at SMU	Canceled due to COVID-19		Moody Coliseum; Dallas, TX
January 2, 2022; 1:00 p.m., ESPN+		at Northern Iowa	L 61–83	4–9 (0–2)	McLeod Center (1,587); Cedar Falls, IA
January 8, 2022; 4:00 p.m., ESPN+		Drake	L 59–60	4–10 (0–3)	Ford Center (3,134); Evansville, IN
January 12, 2022; 7:00 p.m., ESPN+		at Bradley	L 47–79	4–11 (0–4)	Peoria Civic Center (3,606); Peoria, IL
January 18, 2022; 7:00 p.m., ESPN+		No. 22 Loyola–Chicago	L 48–77	4–12 (0–5)	Ford Center (3,190); Evansville, IN
January 21, 2022; 6:00 p.m., ESPN+		at Illinois State	L 56–94	4–13 (0–6)	Redbird Arena (2,721); Normal, IL
January 23, 2022; 1:00 p.m., ESPN+		Illinois State; Rescheduled from January 9	W 56–53	5–13 (1–6)	Ford Center (3,354); Evansville, IN
January 26, 2022; 6:00 p.m., ESPN+		Northern Iowa	L 59–64	5–14 (1–7)	Ford Center (2,770); Evansville, IN
January 29, 2022; 7:00 p.m., ESPN+		at Missouri State	L 58–72	5–15 (1–8)	JQH Arena (3,894); Springfield, MO
February 5, 2022; 1:00 p.m., ESPN+		Bradley	L 41–76	5–16 (1–9)	Ford Center (4,294); Evansville, IN
February 8, 2022; 6:00 p.m., ESPN+		at Indiana State; Rescheduled from January 5	W 65–56	6–16 (2–9)	Hulman Center (2,567); Terre Haute, IN
February 10, 2022; 6:00 p.m., ESPN+		Indiana State	L 77–80 ^{2OT}	6–17 (2–10)	Ford Center (3,177); Evansville, IN
February 12, 2022; 7:00 p.m., ESPN+		at Southern Illinois	L 62–69	6–18 (2–11)	Banterra Center (4,554); Carbondale, IL
February 16, 2022; 7:00 p.m., ESPN+		at Drake	L 51–73	6–19 (2–12)	Knapp Center (3,569); Des Moines, IA
February 19, 2022; 1:00 p.m., ESPN+		Valparaiso	L 56–72	6–20 (2–13)	Ford Center (2,947); Evansville, IN
February 21, 2022; 7:00 p.m., ESPN+		at Valparaiso	L 69–74	6–21 (2–14)	Athletics–Recreation Center (1,107); Valparaiso, IN
February 23, 2022; 7:00 p.m., ESPN+		at Loyola–Chicago	L 31–82	6–22 (2–15)	Gentile Arena (3,843); Chicago, IL
February 26, 2022; 4:00 p.m., ESPN+		Missouri State	L 79–88	6–23 (2–16)	Ford Center (3,696); Evansville, IN
MVC tournament
March 3, 2022; 8:30 p.m., MVC TV	(10)	vs. (7) Valparaiso; Opening round	L 59–81	6–24	Enterprise Center (2,904); St. Louis, MO
*Non-conference game. ^{#}Rankings from AP poll. (#) Tournament seedings in parentheses. All times are in Central.
