= Drew Valentine =

American basketball coach (born 1991)

Current position
- Title: Head coach
- Team: Loyola–Chicago
- Conference: Atlantic 10
- Record: 94–75 (.556)

Biographical details
- Born: May 25, 1991 (age 35); Lansing, Michigan, U.S.

Playing career
- 2009–2013: Oakland
- Position: Forward

Coaching career (HC unless noted)
- 2013–2015: Michigan State (GA)
- 2015–2017: Oakland (assistant)
- 2017–2021: Loyola Chicago (assistant)
- 2021–present: Loyola Chicago

Head coaching record
- Overall: 94–75 (.556)
- Tournaments: 0–1 (NCAA Division I); 0–1 (NIT)

Accomplishments and honors

Championships
- MVC tournament (2022); Atlantic 10 regular season (2024)

Carlton Andrew Valentine II (born May 25, 1991) is an American college basketball coach who is currently the head coach at Loyola University Chicago, a position he assumed in 2021. He played college basketball at Oakland University in Michigan, where he later served as an assistant coach.

== Playing career ==
Valentine played forward at Oakland from 2009 to 2013, where he was a member of two NCAA tournament teams. He finished his playing career second in career games played with the program, as well in the top 10 of both offensive and defensive rebound categories.

== Coaching career ==
After his playing career, Valentine joined the Michigan State staff as a graduate manager, where his brother Denzel was a player. After two seasons with the program, Valentine joined the coaching staff at his alma mater Oakland as an assistant coach, the youngest assistant hired during head coach Greg Kampe's long tenure.

=== Loyola–Chicago ===
Valentine joined the coaching staff at Loyola–Chicago in 2017, where he worked as the program's coordinator for defense. In his first season with Loyola, the Ramblers went on a historic NCAA tournament run that went all the way to the Final Four.

Valentine was promoted to head coach of the program in 2021, following the departure of Porter Moser, who left to accept the head coaching position at Oklahoma. He was believed to be the youngest head coach in NCAA Division I men's basketball at the time of his hiring at the age of 29.

== Personal life ==
Valentine's younger brother Denzel was an AP Player of the Year at Michigan State before being drafted by the Chicago Bulls with the 14th overall pick of the 2016 NBA draft. His father Carlton also played college basketball at Michigan State, and was formerly the head coach of the basketball program at J. W. Sexton High School, where both brothers attended.

== Head coaching record ==
Record table
Season	Team	Overall	Conference	Standing	Postseason
Loyola–Chicago Ramblers (Missouri Valley Conference) (2021–2022)
2021–22	Loyola–Chicago	25–8	13–5	T–2nd	NCAA Division I Round of 64
Loyola–Chicago Ramblers (Atlantic 10 Conference) (2022–present)
2022–23	Loyola–Chicago	10–21	4–14	15th	
2023–24	Loyola–Chicago	23–10	15–3	T–1st	NIT First Round
2024–25	Loyola–Chicago	25–12	12–6	T–3rd	NIT Semifinals
2025–26	Loyola–Chicago	9–24	4–14	T–13th	
2026–27	Loyola–Chicago	2–0	0–0		
Loyola–Chicago:		94–75 (.556)	48–42 (.533)		
Total:		94–75 (.556)			
National champion Postseason invitational champion Conference regular season champion Conference regular season and conference tournament champion Division regular season champion Division regular season and conference tournament champion Conference tournament champion
