= 2021–22 Bradley Braves men's basketball team =

American college basketball season

2021–22 Bradley Braves men's basketball
- Conference: Missouri Valley Conference
- Record: 17–14 (11–7 MVC)
- Head coach: Brian Wardle (7th season)
- Assistant coaches: Drew Adams; Mike Bargen; Jimmie Foster
- Home arena: Carver Arena

2021–22 Missouri Valley Conference men's basketball standings
	Conf.				Overall
Team	W		L	PCT	W		L	PCT
Northern Iowa	14	–	4	.778	20	–	12	.625
Missouri State	13	–	5	.722	23	–	11	.676
Drake	13	–	5	.722	25	–	11	.694
Loyola Chicago †	13	–	5	.722	25	–	8	.758
Bradley	11	–	7	.611	17	–	14	.548
Southern Illinois	9	–	9	.500	16	–	14	.533
Valparaiso	6	–	12	.333	14	–	18	.438
Illinois State	5	–	13	.278	13	–	20	.394
Indiana State	4	–	14	.222	11	–	20	.355
Evansville	2	–	16	.111	6	–	24	.200
† 2022 MVC tournament winner

The 2021–22 Bradley Braves men's basketball team represented Bradley University during the 2021–22 NCAA Division I men's basketball season. The Braves, led by seventh-year head coach Brian Wardle, played their home games at Carver Arena in Peoria, Illinois as members of the Missouri Valley Conference (MVC). They finished the season 17–14, 11–7 in MVC play, to finish in fifth place. They lost to Loyola in the quarterfinals of the MVC tournament.

== Previous season ==
In a season limited due to the ongoing COVID-19 pandemic, the Braves finished the 2020–21 season 12–16, 6–12 in MVC play, to finish in eighth place. They lost to Southern Illinois in the first round of the MVC tournament.

== Offseason ==
=== 2021 recruiting class ===
College recruiting information
Name	Hometown	School	Height	Weight	Commit date
Connor Hickman #10 G	Bloomington, IN	Bloomington South High School	6 ft 3 in (1.91 m)	190 lb (86 kg)	Nov 11, 2020
Connor Hickman #10 G	Recruit ratings: Scout: Rivals: 247Sports:				
Max Ekono #2 G	Bouffémont, France	Scotland Prep	6 ft 7 in (2.01 m)	210 lb (95 kg)	Apr 26, 2021
Max Ekono #2 G	Recruit ratings: Scout: Rivals: 247Sports:				
Zek Montgomery #3 G	Louisville, KY	St. Louis Christian Academy	6 ft 6 in (1.98 m)	205 lb (93 kg)	Jun 12, 2021
Zek Montgomery #3 G	Recruit ratings: Scout: Rivals: 247Sports:				
Overall recruit ranking: Scout: – Rivals: –
Note: In many cases, Scout, Rivals, 247Sports, On3, and ESPN may conflict in their listings of height and weight.; In these cases, the average was taken. ESPN grades are on a 100-point scale.; Sources: "Bradley Commit List for 2021". Rivals.; "2021 Team Ranking". Rivals.

== Roster ==
2021–22 Bradley Braves men's basketball team
Players
Coaches

Pos.	#	Name	Height	Weight	Year	Previous school	Hometown
G	0	Terry Roberts	6 ft 3 in (1.91 m)	180 lb (82 kg)	Jr	Believe Prep; Florida SouthWestern	North Amityville, NY
C	1	Ari Boya	7 ft 1 in (2.16 m)	245 lb (111 kg)	Sr	Scotland Prep	Douala, Cameroon
G	2	Max Ekono	6 ft 7 in (2.01 m)	210 lb (95 kg)	Fr	Scotland Prep	Bouffémont, France
G	3	Zek Montgomery	6 ft 6 in (1.98 m)	205 lb (93 kg)	Fr	St. Louis Christian Academy	Louisville, KY
G	5	Mikey Howell	6 ft 3 in (1.91 m)	170 lb (77 kg)	GS	San Marcos HS; UC San Diego	San Diego, CA
G	10	Connor Hickman	6 ft 3 in (1.91 m)	190 lb (86 kg)	Fr	Bloomington South HS	Bloomington, IN
G	13	Sam Hennessy (W)	6 ft 2 in (1.88 m)	180 lb (82 kg)	Fr	Benet Academy	Naperville, IL
F	14	Malevy Leons	6 ft 9 in (2.06 m)	210 lb (95 kg)	Jr	Mineral Area	IJmuiden, Netherlands
G/F	20	Jayson Kent	6 ft 7 in (2.01 m)	205 lb (93 kg)	So	Oak Forest HS	Oak Forest, IL
G	21	Cade Hardtke (W)	6 ft 2 in (1.88 m)	185 lb (84 kg)	Fr	Glenbard South HS	Lombard, IL
F	22	Ja'Shon Henry	6 ft 6 in (1.98 m)	230 lb (104 kg)	Sr	Athol Murray College of Notre Dame	Saskatoon, SK
G	23	Ville Tahvanainen	6 ft 4 in (1.93 m)	210 lb (95 kg)	Jr	Helsinki Basketball Academy	Helsinki, Finland
G/F	30	Riley Burger	6 ft 5 in (1.96 m)	205 lb (93 kg)	Jr	Totino-Grace HS	Orono, MN
F	34	Connor Linke	6 ft 9 in (2.06 m)	230 lb (104 kg)	So	St. Charles North HS	St. Charles, IL
F	35	Darius Hannah	6 ft 9 in (2.06 m)	195 lb (88 kg)	So	Milwaukee Academy of Science	Milwaukee, WI
F	51	Rienk Mast	6 ft 9 in (2.06 m)	240 lb (109 kg)	RS So	Donar Groningen	Groningen, Netherlands

Head coach

- Brian Wardle (Marquette)

Assistant coach(es)

- Drew Adams (Tennessee)
- Mike Bargen (Marquette)
- Jimmie Foster (South Dakota)

Legend

- (C) Team captain
- (S) Suspended
- (I) Ineligible
- (W) Walk-on
- Injured
- Current redshirt

Roster
Last update: October 18, 2024

== Preseason ==
In the conference's yearly preseason poll, Bradley was picked to finish in sixth place. Sophomore forward Rienk Mast was named to the preseason all-conference third team.

== Schedule and results ==
Date time, TV	Rank^{#}	Opponent^{#}	Result	Record	Site (attendance) city, state
Exhibition
November 4, 2021*; 8:00 p.m.		Illinois–Springfield	W 93–64		Carver Arena (1,735); Peoria, IL
Regular season
November 9, 2021*; 8:15 p.m., ESPN+		at South Dakota State	L 65–81	0–1	Frost Arena (2,445); Brookings, SD
November 13, 2021*; 2:00 p.m., ESPN+		Howard	L 64–76	0–2	Carver Arena (3,814); Peoria, IL
November 16, 2021*; 7:00 p.m., ESPN3		Missouri S&T	W 92–66	1–2	Carver Arena (3,450); Peoria, IL
November 19, 2021*; 12:00 p.m., ESPN3		vs. Colorado State; Paradise Jam tournament quarterfinals	L 60–66	1–3	Sports and Fitness Center (622); Saint Thomas, USVI
November 20, 2021*; 2:15 p.m., ESPN3		vs. Brown; Paradise Jam tournament consolation 2nd round	L 62–65	1–4	Sports and Fitness Center; Saint Thomas, USVI
November 22, 2021*; 12:00 p.m., ESPN3		vs. Duquesne; Paradise Jam tournament 7th-place game	L 70–78	1–5	Sports and Fitness Center; Saint Thomas, USVI
November 27, 2021*; 2:00 p.m., ESPN3		Maine	W 71–39	2–5	Carver Arena (3,515); Peoria, IL
December 1, 2021; 7:00 p.m., ESPN+		Northern Iowa	W 71–69	3–5 (1–0)	Carver Arena (3,551); Peoria, IL
December 4, 2021*; 2:00 p.m., ESPN3		SIU Edwardsville	W 80–55	4–5	Carver Arena (3,685); Peoria, IL
December 7, 2021*; 6:00 p.m., ESPN+		at Toledo	L 65–67	4–6	Savage Arena (3,567); Toledo, OH
December 18, 2021*; 2:00 p.m., NBCSC		Saint Joseph's	W 77–73	5–6	Carver Arena (3,827); Peoria, IL
December 21, 2021*; 7:00 p.m.		Sam Houston State; Don Haskins Sun Bowl Invitational semifinals	W 87–61	6–6	Don Haskins Center; El Paso, TX
December 22, 2021*; 7:00 p.m.		UTEP; Don Haskins Sun Bowl Invitational championship game	W 73–66	7–6	Don Haskins Center (4,082); El Paso, TX
December 29, 2021*; 7:00 p.m., ESPN3		Bellarmine	Canceled due to COVID-19		Carver Arena; Peoria, IL
January 2, 2022; 12:00 p.m., ESPN+		at Indiana State	L 71–76	7–7 (1–1)	Hulman Center (2,806); Terre Haute, IN
January 5, 2022; 8:00 p.m., CBSSN		Missouri State	L 69–71	7–8 (1–2)	Carver Arena (3,756); Peoria, IL
January 8, 2022; 3:00 p.m., NBCSC		at Loyola–Chicago	L 71–78 ^{OT}	7–9 (1–3)	Gentile Arena (3,092); Chicago, IL
January 12, 2022; 7:00 p.m., ESPN+		Evansville	W 79–47	8–9 (2–3)	Carver Arena (3,606); Peoria, IL
January 16, 2022; 7:00 p.m., ESPN+		at Illinois State; I-74 Rivalry	L 65–74	8–10 (2–4)	Redbird Arena (4,072); Normal, IL
January 19, 2022; 7:00 p.m., ESPN+		at Drake	W 83–71	9–10 (3–4)	Knapp Center (2,724); Des Moines, IA
January 22, 2022; 7:00 p.m., ESPN+		Southern Illinois	W 70–62	10–10 (4–4)	Carver Arena (3,987); Peoria, IL
January 26, 2022; 6:00 p.m., ESPN+		at Valparaiso	W 71–56	11–10 (5–4)	Athletics–Recreation Center (1,220); Valparaiso, IN
January 30, 2022; 1:00 p.m., ESPN+		Indiana State	W 67–52	12–10 (6–4)	Carver Arena (4,554); Peoria, IL
February 2, 2022; 7:00 p.m., ESPN+		at Northern Iowa	L 65–78	12–11 (6–5)	McLeod Center (2,655); Cedar Falls, IA
February 5, 2022; 1:00 p.m., ESPN+		at Evansville	W 76–41	13–11 (7–5)	Ford Center (4,294); Evansville, IN
February 9, 2022; 8:00 p.m., CBSSN		Loyola–Chicago	W 68–61	14–11 (8–5)	Carver Arena (4,450); Peoria, IL
February 12, 2022; 7:00 p.m., ESPN+		Drake	W 68–59	15–11 (9–5)	Carver Arena (5,109); Peoria, IL
February 15, 2022; 7:00 p.m., ESPN+		at Southern Illinois	L 57–65	15–12 (9–6)	Banterra Center (4,432); Carbondale, IL
February 19, 2022; 1:00 p.m.		Illinois State; I-74 Rivalry	W 72–64	16–12 (10–6)	Carver Arena (6,902); Peoria, IL
February 23, 2022; 7:00 p.m., ESPN+		at Missouri State	L 67–83	16–13 (10–7)	JQH Arena (1,831); Springfield, MO
February 26, 2022; 7:00 p.m., ESPN+		Valparaiso	W 79–55	17–13 (11–7)	Carver Arena (5,660); Peoria, IL
MVC tournament
March 4, 2022; 2:30 p.m., MVC TV	(5)	vs. (4) Loyola–Chicago; Quarterfinals	L 50–66	17–14	Enterprise Center; St. Louis, MO
*Non-conference game. ^{#}Rankings from AP poll. (#) Tournament seedings in parentheses. All times are in Central.
