= 2021–22 Missouri State Bears basketball team =

American college basketball season

2021–22 Missouri State Bears basketball

NIT, First Round
- Conference: Missouri Valley Conference
- Record: 23–11 (13–5 MVC)
- Head coach: Dana Ford (4th season)
- Associate head coach: Corey Gipson
- Assistant coaches: Jase Herl; Sheldon Everett
- Home arena: JQH Arena

2021–22 Missouri Valley Conference men's basketball standings
	Conf.				Overall
Team	W		L	PCT	W		L	PCT
Northern Iowa	14	–	4	.778	20	–	12	.625
Missouri State	13	–	5	.722	23	–	11	.676
Drake	13	–	5	.722	25	–	11	.694
Loyola Chicago †	13	–	5	.722	25	–	8	.758
Bradley	11	–	7	.611	17	–	14	.548
Southern Illinois	9	–	9	.500	16	–	14	.533
Valparaiso	6	–	12	.333	14	–	18	.438
Illinois State	5	–	13	.278	13	–	20	.394
Indiana State	4	–	14	.222	11	–	20	.355
Evansville	2	–	16	.111	6	–	24	.200
† 2022 MVC tournament winner

The 2021–22 Missouri State Bears basketball team represented Missouri State University during the 2021–22 NCAA Division I men's basketball season. The Bears, led by fourth-year head coach Dana Ford, played their home games at JQH Arena in Springfield, Missouri as members of the Missouri Valley Conference. They finished the season 23–11, 13–5 in MVC Play to finish a three-way tie for 2nd place. They defeated Valparaiso in the quarterfinals of the MVC tournament before losing in the semifinals to Drake. They received an at-large bid to the National Invitation Tournament where they lost in the first round to Oklahoma.

== Previous season ==
In a season limited due to the ongoing COVID-19 pandemic, the Bears finished the 2020–21 season 17–7, 12–6 in MVC play to finish in third place. They defeated Valparaiso in the quarterfinals of the MVC tournament before losing to Drake in the semifinals.

== Roster ==
2021–22 Missouri State Bears men's basketball team
Players
Coaches

Pos.	#	Name	Height	Weight	Year	Previous school	Hometown
G	0	DeMarcus Sharp	6 ft 3 in (1.91 m)	173 lb (78 kg)	Sr	Charleston HS; Colby CC	Charleston, MO
G	1	Isiaih Mosley	6 ft 5 in (1.96 m)	194 lb (88 kg)	Jr	Rock Bridge HS	Columbia, MO
G	2	Elijah Bridgers	6 ft 2 in (1.88 m)	172 lb (78 kg)	So	Kickapoo HS	Springfield, MO
G	3	Isaac Haney	6 ft 2 in (1.88 m)	176 lb (80 kg)	Fr	Kickapoo HS	Springfield, MO
G	4	Ja'Monta Black	6 ft 4 in (1.93 m)	202 lb (92 kg)	Jr	Rock Bridge HS	Columbia, MO
G/F	5	Donovan Clay	6 ft 8 in (2.03 m)	223 lb (101 kg)	Jr	Alton HS; Valparaiso	Alton, IL
G	11	Raphe Ayres	6 ft 5 in (1.96 m)	205 lb (93 kg)	So	Vermont Academy	Arlington, VT
G	12	Jaylen Minnett	6 ft 1 in (1.85 m)	182 lb (83 kg)	Sr	Terre Haute South Vigo HS; IUPUI	Terre Haute, IN
F	13	Melvyn Ebonkoli	6 ft 7 in (2.01 m)	229 lb (104 kg)	So	Putnam Science Academy	Trappes, France
G/F	14	Keaton Hervey	6 ft 7 in (2.01 m)	197 lb (89 kg)	Sr	Cedar Park HS; New Mexico JC	Cedar Park, TX
F	20	Nic Tata	6 ft 10 in (2.08 m)	263 lb (119 kg)	Sr	Mt. Eliza Secondary; Blinn CC	Melbourne, Australia
G	25	Lu'Cye Patterson	6 ft 1 in (1.85 m)	209 lb (95 kg)	So	Minnesota Prep Academy	Minneapolis, MN
C	33	Dawson Carper	7 ft 0 in (2.13 m)	255 lb (116 kg)	Sr	Rampart HS; Hawaii	Colorado Springs, CO
F	44	Gaige Prim	6 ft 9 in (2.06 m)	235 lb (107 kg)	Sr	Grandview HS; South Plains CC	Aurora, CO
G	55	Skylar Wicks	6 ft 5 in (1.96 m)	186 lb (84 kg)	So	Surge Christian Academy	Jersey City, NJ

Head coach

- Dana Ford (Illinois State)

Assistant coach(es)

- Corey Gipson (Austin Peay)
- Jase Herl (Colorado Mesa)
- Sheldon Everett (South Carolina)

Legend

- (C) Team captain
- (S) Suspended
- (I) Ineligible
- (W) Walk-on
- Injured
- Current redshirt

Roster
Last update: November 5, 2021

== Schedule and results ==
Date time, TV	Rank^{#}	Opponent^{#}	Result	Record	Site (attendance) city, state
Regular season
November 9, 2021*; 7:00 p.m., ESPN+		Southeast Missouri State	L 94–99	0–1	JQH Arena (4,190); Springfield, MO
November 13, 2021*; 7:00 p.m., ESPN3		Alabama State	W 78–60	1–1	JQH Arena (3,922); Springfield, MO
November 17, 2021*; 7:30 p.m., ESPN+		at Sam Houston State	W 77–55	2–1	Bernard Johnson Coliseum (741); Huntsville, TX
November 22, 2021*; 7:00 p.m., FloHoops		vs. Long Beach State; Naples Invitational first round	W 92–66	3–1	CSN Fieldhouse (378); Naples, FL
November 23, 2021*; 8:00 p.m., FloHoops		vs. East Tennessee State; Naples Invitational semifinals	L 76–77	3–2	CSN Fieldhouse (317); Naples, FL
November 24, 2021*; 8:00 p.m., FloHoops		vs. George Washington; Naples Invitational third place game	W 72–54	4–2	CSN Fieldhouse (137); Naples, FL
December 1, 2021; 7:00 p.m., ESPN+		at Illinois State	L 74–79 ^{OT}	4–3 (0–1)	Redbird Arena (2,902); Normal, IL
December 4, 2021*; 3:00 p.m., CBSSN		No. 12 BYU	L 68–74	4–4	JQH Arena (7,006); Springfield, MO
December 8, 2021*; 6:30 p.m., ESPN+		at Little Rock	W 81–55	5–4	Jack Stephens Center (1,057); Little Rock, AR
December 11, 2021*; 3:00 p.m., ESPN3		Oral Roberts	W 69–60	6–4	JQH Arena (4,002); Springfield, MO
December 15, 2021*; 6:00 p.m., ESPN+		South Dakota State	W 75–63	7–4	JQH Arena (3,027); Springfield, MO
December 18, 2021*; 6:00 p.m., KOZL/ESPN3		Central Arkansas	W 106–70	8–4	JQH Arena (2,561); Springfield, MO
December 22, 2021*; 9:00 p.m.		at Saint Mary's	L 58–75	8–5	University Credit Union Pavilion (2,716); Moraga, CA
December 30, 2021*; 12:00 p.m., ESPN3		Evangel	W 103–56	9–5	JQH Arena (1,721); Springfield, MO
January 2, 2022; 7:00 p.m., MVC Network		Drake	W 61–56	10–5 (1–1)	JQH Arena (3,242); Springfield, MO
January 5, 2022; 8:00 p.m., CBSSN		at Bradley	W 71–69	11–5 (2–1)	Carver Arena (3,756); Peoria, IL
January 8, 2022; 5:00 p.m., CBSSN		Northern Iowa	L 84–85	11–6 (2–2)	JQH Arena (3,352); Springfield, MO
January 12, 2022; 7:00 p.m., ESPN+		Southern Illinois	W 81–76	12–6 (3–2)	JQH Arena (3,886); Springfield, MO
January 15, 2022; 4:00 p.m., ESPNU		at Valparaiso	W 74–57	13–6 (4–2)	Athletics–Recreation Center (1,621); Valparaiso, IN
January 19, 2022; 7:00 p.m., KOZL/ESPN+		Illinois State	W 88–63	14–6 (5–2)	JQH Arena (3,362); Springfield, MO
January 22, 2022; 2:30 p.m., CBSSN		at No. 22 Loyola–Chicago	W 79–69	15–6 (6–2)	Joseph J. Gentile Arena (4,105); Chicago, IL
January 25, 2022; 6:00 p.m., ESPN+		at Indiana State	L 72–76	15–7 (6–3)	Hulman Center (3,011); Terre Haute, IN
January 29, 2022; 7:00 p.m., ESPN+		Evansville	W 72–58	16–7 (7–3)	JQH Arena (3,894); Springfield, MO
February 2, 2022; 8:00 p.m., BSMW		at Southern Illinois	W 69–54	17–7 (8–3)	Banterra Center (3,630); Carbondale, IL
February 6, 2022; 1:00 p.m., ESPN2		Loyola–Chicago	L 62–71	17–8 (8–4)	JQH Arena (6,117); Springfield, MO
February 9, 2022; 7:00 p.m., BSMW		at Drake	W 66–62	18–8 (9–4)	Knapp Center (3,305); Des Moines, IA
February 12, 2022; 3:00 p.m., BSMW		Valparaiso	W 84–66	19–8 (10–4)	JQH Arena (4,314); Springfield, MO
February 15, 2022; 7:00 p.m., ESPN+		Indiana State	W 79–70	20–8 (11–4)	JQH Arena (3,522); Springfield, MO
February 20, 2022; 1:00 p.m., ESPN2		at Northern Iowa	L 75–95	20–9 (11–5)	McLeod Center (3,353); Cedar Falls, IA
February 23, 2022; 7:00 p.m., ESPN+		Bradley	W 83–67	21–9 (12–5)	JQH Arena (1,831); Springfield, MO
February 26, 2022; 4:00 p.m., ESPN3		at Evansville	W 88–79	22–9 (13–5)	Ford Center (3,696); Evansville, IN
MVC tournament
March 4, 2022; 6:00 p.m., MVC TV	(2)	vs. (7) Valparaiso; Quarterfinals	W 67–58	23–9	Enterprise Center; St. Louis, MO
March 5, 2022; 5:00 p.m., CBSSN	(2)	vs. (3) Drake; Semifinals	L 78–79 ^{OT}	23–10	Enterprise Center (6,371); St. Louis, MO
NIT tournament
March 15, 2022; 6:00 p.m., ESPN		at (1) Oklahoma; First Round – Oklahoma Bracket	L 72–89	23–11	Lloyd Noble Center (3,439); Norman, OK
*Non-conference game. ^{#}Rankings from AP Poll. (#) Tournament seedings in parentheses. All times are in Central Time.
