= 2021–22 Toledo Rockets men's basketball team =

American college basketball season

2021–22 Toledo Rockets men's basketball

Nassau Championship champions MAC regular season champions

NIT, First Round
- Conference: Mid-American Conference
- Record: 26–8 (17–3 MAC)
- Head coach: Tod Kowalczyk (12th season)
- Associate head coach: Jeff Massey (8th season)
- Assistant coaches: Justin Ingram (4th season); Walter Offutt (3rd season)
- Home arena: Savage Arena

2021–22 Mid-American Conference men's basketball standings
	Conf.				Overall
Team	W		L	PCT	W		L	PCT
Toledo	17	–	3	.850	26	–	8	.765
Kent State	16	–	4	.800	23	–	11	.676
Ohio	14	–	6	.700	25	–	10	.714
Akron †	14	–	6	.700	24	–	10	.706
Buffalo	13	–	6	.684	19	–	11	.633
Ball State	9	–	10	.474	14	–	17	.452
Miami (OH)	8	–	12	.400	14	–	18	.438
Central Michigan	6	–	12	.333	7	–	23	.233
Bowling Green	6	–	14	.300	13	–	18	.419
Northern Illinois	6	–	14	.300	9	–	21	.300
Eastern Michigan	5	–	15	.250	10	–	21	.323
Western Michigan	4	–	16	.200	8	–	23	.258
† 2022 MAC tournament winner

The 2021–22 Toledo Rockets men's basketball team represented the University of Toledo during the 2021–22 NCAA Division I men's basketball season. The Rockets, led by 12th-year head coach Tod Kowalczyk, played their home games at Savage Arena, as members of the Mid-American Conference. They finished the season 26-8, 17-3 in MAC Play to finish as regular season champions. They defeated Central Michigan in the quarterfinals of the MAC tournament before losing in the semifinals to Akron. As a No. 1 seed who failed to win their conference tournament, they received an automatic bid to the National Invitation Tournament, where they lost in the first round to Dayton.

== Previous season ==
In a season limited due to the ongoing COVID-19 pandemic, the Rockets finished the 2020–21 season 21–9, 15–4 in MAC play to win MAC regular season championship. They defeated Ball State in the first round of the MAC tournament before losing to eventual tournament champions Ohio in the second round. They received an at-large bid to the National Invitation Tournament, where they lost to Richmond in the first round.

== Offseason ==
=== Departures ===
Name	Number	Pos.	Height	Weight	Year	Hometown	Reason for departure
Marreon Jackson	3	G	6'1"	200	Senior	Cleveland, Ohio	Transferred to Arizona State
Mattia Acunzo	4	F	6'8"	225	RS freshman	Sardinia, Italy	Transferred to Robert Morris
Spencer Littleson	11	G	6'4"	200	Senior	Rochester Hills, Michigan	Graduated
Luke Maranka	12	F	6'10"	225	Sophomore	Ada, Michigan	Transferred to Davenport
Blake Williams	22	G	6'0"	195	Senior	Holland, Ohio	Graduated
Jonathan Komagum	35	F/C	6'9"	215	Junior	Cleveland, Ohio	Transferred to Sacramento State

=== Incoming transfers ===
Name	Number	Pos.	Height	Weight	Year	Hometown	Notes
RayJ Dennis	10	G	6'2"	180	Junior	Plainfield, Illinois	Transferred from Boise State. Had two years of remaining eligibility.
Jordan Burge	21	G	6'3"	200	Junior	Cleveland, Ohio	Transferred from Parkland College. Had two years of remaining eligibility.

=== 2021 recruiting class ===
College recruiting
Name	Hometown	School	Height	Weight	Commit date
Mihai Carcoana; C	Ludus, Romania	Elevation Prep	6 ft 11 in (2.11 m)	240 lb (110 kg)	
Mihai Carcoana; C	Recruit ratings: No ratings found				
Arnor Eythorsson; SF	Selfoss, Iceland	Sudurland College	6 ft 7 in (2.01 m)	190 lb (86 kg)	
Arnor Eythorsson; SF	Recruit ratings: No ratings found				
EJ Farmer; PG	Cleveland, Ohio	Cleveland Heights	6 ft 4 in (1.93 m)	175 lb (79 kg)	
EJ Farmer; PG	Recruit ratings: No ratings found				
Kooper Jacobi; SF	Sellersburg, Indiana	Silver Creek	6 ft 6 in (1.98 m)	200 lb (91 kg)	
Kooper Jacobi; SF	Recruit ratings: No ratings found				
Elijah Wilson; SG	Lithonia, Georgia	Mountain View	6 ft 5 in (1.96 m)	180 lb (82 kg)	
Elijah Wilson; SG	Recruit ratings: No ratings found				
Overall recruit ranking:
Note: In many cases, Scout, Rivals, 247Sports, On3, and ESPN may conflict in their listings of height and weight.; In these cases, the average was taken. ESPN grades are on a 100-point scale.; Sources: "2021 Team Ranking". Rivals.

== Roster ==
2021–22 Toledo Rockets men's basketball team
Players
Coaches

Pos.	#	Name	Height	Weight	Year	Previous school	Hometown
G	0	Ra'Heim Moss	6 ft 4 in (1.93 m)	205 lb (93 kg)	RS Fr	SPIRE Academy	Springfield, OH
G	1	Jamere Hill	6 ft 3 in (1.91 m)	175 lb (79 kg)	So	Joliet West	Joliet, IL
G	2	EJ Farmer	6 ft 4 in (1.93 m)	170 lb (77 kg)	Fr	Cleveland Heights	Cleveland, OH
G	3	Elijah Wilson	6 ft 5 in (1.96 m)	180 lb (82 kg)	Fr	Mountain View	Lithonia, GA
F	4	Setric Millner Jr.	6 ft 7 in (2.01 m)	205 lb (93 kg)	Sr	Northwest Florida State College	Little Rock, AR
G	5	Ryan Rollins	6 ft 4 in (1.93 m)	180 lb (82 kg)	So	Dakota	Macomb, MI
G	10	RayJ Dennis	6 ft 2 in (1.88 m)	180 lb (82 kg)	Jr	Boise State	Plainfield, IL
F	11	Arnor Eythorsson	6 ft 7 in (2.01 m)	190 lb (86 kg)	Fr	Sudurland College	Selfoss, Iceland
F	12	Kooper Jacobi	6 ft 6 in (1.98 m)	200 lb (91 kg)	Fr	Silver Creek	Sellersburg, IN
C	13	Mihai Carcoana	6 ft 11 in (2.11 m)	240 lb (109 kg)	Fr	Eleveation Prep	Ludus, Romania
F/C	15	A. J. Edu	6 ft 10 in (2.08 m)	225 lb (102 kg)	RS Jr	South Gloucestershire and Stroud College	Colchester, England
G	21	Jordan Burge	6 ft 3 in (1.91 m)	200 lb (91 kg)	Jr	Parkland College	Cleveland, OH
G	24	Keshaun Saunders	6 ft 5 in (1.96 m)	190 lb (86 kg)	RS Jr	Orangeville Prep	Brampton, ON
F	32	JT Shumate	6 ft 7 in (2.01 m)	210 lb (95 kg)	Sr	Newark; Walsh University	Newark, OH

Head coach

- Tod Kowalczyk (Minnesota Duluth)

Assistant coach(es)

- Jeff Massey (Xavier)
- Walter Offutt (Ohio)
- Justin Ingram (Toledo)

Roster

Legend

- (C) Team captain
- (S) Suspended
- (I) Ineligible
- (W) Walk-on
- Injured
- Current redshirt

== Schedule and results ==
Date time, TV	Rank^{#}	Opponent^{#}	Result	Record	High points	High rebounds	High assists	Site (attendance) city, state
Exhibition
October 23, 2021*; 12:00 pm		Hillsdale	W 93–68	–	30 – Rollins	8 – 2 Tied	5 – Dennis	Savage Arena; Toledo, OH
October 30, 2021*; 1:00 pm		at Findlay	W 83–78	–	28 – Rollins	9 – Rollins	3 – 2 Tied	Croy Gymnasium (812); Findlay, OH
Non-conference regular season
November 9, 2021*; 7:00 pm, ESPN+		at Valparaiso	W 69–61	1–0	20 – Shumate	9 – Shumate	4 – Dennis	Athletics–Recreation Center (2,824); Valparaiso, IN
November 13, 2021*; 7:00 pm, ESPN3		Detroit Mercy	W 81–73	2–0	19 – Rollins	11 – Shumate	4 – Rollins	Savage Arena (5,086); Toledo, OH
November 17, 2021*; 7:00 pm, ESPN+		at Oakland	L 59–80	2–1	21 – Rollins	11 – Millner Jr.	4 – Rollins/Millner Jr.	Athletics Center O'rena (3,616); Auburn Hills, MI
November 22, 2021*; 12:00 pm, FloSports		vs. Charlotte; Nassau Championship Quarterfinal	W 98–86	3–1	27 – Millner Jr.	9 – Dennis	4 – Rollins	Baha Mar Convention Center; Nassau, Bahamas
November 23, 2021*; 5:30 pm, FloSports		vs. Tulane; Nassau Championship Semifinal	W 68–67	4–1	19 – Shumate	12 – Millner Jr.	5 – Dennis	Baha Mar Convention Center; Nassau, Bahamas
November 24, 2021*; 8:00 pm, FloSports		vs. Coastal Carolina; Nassau Championship Final	W 79–70	5–1	35 – Rollins	6 – Dennis/Moss	6 – Dennis	Baha Mar Convention Center (500); Nassau, Bahamas
November 29, 2021*; 7:00 pm, ESPN3		Northwest Ohio	W 106–36	6–1	17 – Millner Jr.	7 – 3 tied	8 – Rollins	Savage Arena; Toledo, OH
December 4, 2021*; 5:00 pm, BTN		at No. 22 Michigan State	L 68–81	6–2	21 – Rollins	10 – Dennis	3 – Shumate	Breslin Center (14,797); East Lansing, MI
December 7, 2021*; 7:00 pm, ESPN+		Bradley	W 67–65	7–2	27 – Rollins	9 – Shumate	4 – Dennis	Savage Arena (3,576); Toledo, Ohio
December 11, 2021*; 6:00 pm, ESPN+		at Richmond	L 69–72	7–3	25 – Millner Jr.	8 – Millner Jr.	6 – Rollins	Robins Center (6,592); Richmond, VA
December 21, 2021*; 7:00 pm, ESPN+		Marshall	W 95–63	8–3	23 – Rollins	9 – Shumate	5 – Dennis	Savage Arena (3,769); Toledo, OH
MAC regular season
December 29, 2021; 7:00 pm, ESPN3		Western Michigan	W 83–56	9–3 (1–0)	22 – Shumate	11 – Shumate	5 – Shumate	Savage Arena (4,028); Toledo, OH
January 1, 2022; 2:00 pm, ESPN3		at Kent State	L 63–66	9–4 (1–1)	14 – Rollins	9 – Rollins	3 – Dennis	MAC Center (701); Kent, OH
January 4, 2022; 7:00 pm, ESPN3		at Central Michigan	W 82–54	10–4 (2–1)	21 – Rollins	8 – Millner Jr.	4 – Shumate	McGuirk Arena (1,075); Mount Pleasant, MI
January 8, 2022; 2:00 pm, ESPN3		Northern Illinois	W 94–63	11–4 (3–1)	16 – Millner Jr.	7 – Rollins	4 – Millner Jr.	Savage Arena (3,780); Toledo, OH
January 11, 2022; 7:00 pm, ESPN+		at Miami (OH)	W 75–72	12–4 (4–1)	22 – Rollins	7 – Moss	4 – Moss	Millett Hall (913); Oxford, OH
January 15, 2022; 6:00 pm, ESPN3		at Bowling Green	W 91–78	13–4 (5–1)	29 – Shumate	9 – Shumate	10 – Rollins	Stroh Center (3,366); Bowling Green, OH
January 18, 2022; 7:00 pm, ESPN3		Ball State	W 83–70	14–4 (6–1)	24 – Rollins	10 – Rollins	7 – Rollins	Savage Arena (3,635); Toledo, OH
January 21, 2022; 6:00 pm, CBSSN		at Ohio	W 87–69	15–4 (7–1)	26 – Rollins	6 – Rollins	5 – Rollins	Convocation Center (8,069); Athens, OH
January 25, 2022; 7:00 pm, ESPN+		Buffalo	W 86–75	16–4 (8–1)	25 – Rollins	11 – Rollins	6 – Moss	Savage Arena (3,927); Toledo, OH
January 28, 2022; 7:00 pm, CBSSN		Akron	W 84–76	17–4 (9–1)	21 – Rollins	9 – Millner Jr.	6 – Moss	Savage Arena (5,489); Toledo, OH
February 1, 2022; 7:00 pm, ESPN3		at Eastern Michigan	W 86–66	18–4 (10–1)	24 – Shumate	10 – Moss	4 – Millner Jr.	George Gervin GameAbove Center (1,791); Ypsilanti, MI
February 4, 2022; 9:00 pm, ESPNU		at Ball State	L 83–93	18–5 (10–2)	22 – Rollins	9 – Moss	5 – Rollins	Worthen Arena (3,321); Muncie, IN
February 8, 2022; 7:00 pm, ESPN3		Ohio	W 77–62	19–5 (11–2)	18 – Millner Jr.	16 – Rollins	8 – Rollins	Savage Arena (5,881); Toledo, OH
February 12, 2022; 4:30 pm, ESPN+		at Northern Illinois	W 100–72	20–5 (12–2)	22 – Dennis	8 – Dennis	8 – Dennis	Convocation Center (1,141); DeKalb, IL
February 15, 2022; 6:00 pm, CBSSN		Kent State	L 59–72	20–6 (12–3)	21 – Dennis	7 – Moss	6 – Millner Jr.	Savage Arena (4,570); Toledo, OH
February 19, 2022; 2:00 pm, ESPN3		Central Michigan	W 68–66	21–6 (13–3)	29 – Shumate	7 – Shumate	5 – Millner Jr.	Savage Arena (5,049); Toledo, OH
February 22, 2022; 7:00 pm, ESPN3		at Western Michigan	W 92–50	22–6 (14–3)	28 – Millner Jr.	9 – Dennis	7 – Rollins	University Arena (1,660); Kalamazoo, MI
February 26, 2022; 2:00 pm, ESPN3		Miami (OH)	W 88–73	23–6 (15–3)	24 – Rollins	12 – Moss	5 – Dennis	Savage Arena (5,539); Toledo, OH
March 1, 2022; 7:00 pm, ESPN+		at Buffalo	W 92–76	24–6 (16–3)	20 – Rollins	8 – Rollins	6 – Rollins	Alumni Arena (5,470); Buffalo, NY
March 4, 2022; 7:00 pm, ESPN+		Bowling Green	W 96–56	25–6 (17–3)	22 – Shumate	10 – Moss	9 – Dennis	Savage Arena (6,712); Toledo, OH
MAC Tournament
March 10, 2022; 11:00 am, ESPN+	(1)	vs. (8) Central Michigan; Quarterfinals	W 72–71	26–6	22 – Millner Jr.	6 – Rollins	4 – Moss	Rocket Mortgage FieldHouse; Cleveland, OH
March 11, 2022; 5:00 pm, CBSSN	(1)	vs. (4) Akron; Semifinals	L 62–70	26–7	18 – Rollins	7 – Moss	3 – Rollins	Rocket Mortgage FieldHouse; Cleveland, OH
NIT
March 16, 2022; 7:00 pm, ESPN+		(1) Dayton; First Round – Dayton Bracket	L 55–74	26–8	18 – Millner Jr.	7 – Millner Jr.	4 – Dennis	Savage Arena (3,709); Toledo, OH
*Non-conference game. ^{#}Rankings from AP Poll. (#) Tournament seedings in parentheses. All times are in Eastern Time.
