= 2022–23 Mid-American Conference men's basketball season =

- League: NCAA Division I
- Sport: Basketball
- Teams: 12

Regular season
- League champions: Toledo
- Runners-up: Kent State
- Season MVP: RayJ Dennis

Tournament
- Champions: Kent State
- Runners-up: Toledo
- Finals MVP: Sincere Carry

Mid-American men's basketball seasons
- ← 2021–22 2023–24 →

2022–23 Mid-American Conference men's basketball standings
	Conf.				Overall
Team	W		L	PCT	W		L	PCT
Toledo	16	–	2	.889	27	–	8	.771
Kent State †	15	–	3	.833	28	–	7	.800
Akron	13	–	5	.722	22	–	11	.667
Ball State	11	–	7	.611	20	–	12	.625
Ohio	10	–	8	.556	19	–	14	.576
Buffalo	9	–	9	.500	15	–	17	.469
Northern Illinois	9	–	9	.500	13	–	19	.406
Miami (OH)	6	–	12	.333	12	–	20	.375
Bowling Green	5	–	13	.278	11	–	20	.355
Eastern Michigan	5	–	13	.278	8	–	23	.258
Central Michigan	5	–	13	.278	10	–	21	.323
Western Michigan	4	–	14	.222	8	–	23	.258
† 2023 MAC tournament winner

The 2022–23 Mid-American Conference men's basketball season is the season for Mid-American Conference men's basketball teams. It began with practices in October 2022, followed by the start of the 2022–23 NCAA Division I men's basketball season in November. Conference play began in January 2023 and concluded in March 2023. The 2023 MAC tournament was held at Rocket Mortgage FieldHouse in Cleveland, Ohio for the 24th consecutive season.

Toledo won their third straight regular season championship with a 16-2 record in MAC Play. RayJ Dennis was named player of the year. Second seed Kent State defeated Northern Illinois, Akron, and top seeded Toledo to win the MAC tournament.

== Head coaches ==
=== Coaching changes ===
==== Ball State ====
On March 14, 2022, Ball State fired James Whitford after nine seasons with a 131–148 record at the school. Ball State hired UCLA assistant coach Michael Lewis on March 25, 2022.

==== Miami ====
After the season Miami fired head coach Jack Owens after five years and a 70–83 record. On April 1, 2022, Miami hired Travis Steele, who had been let go by Xavier at the end of the 2022 season.

==== Western Michigan ====
Clayton Bates resigned on March 7, 2022 as the head coach of Western Michigan after posting a two-year record of 13–39. On April 5, Michigan State associate head coach Dwayne Stephens was named the new head coach.

=== Coaches ===
Team	Head coach	Previous job	Years at school	Overall record	School record	MAC record	MAC titles	MAC Tournament titles	NCAA tournaments	NCAA Final Fours	NCAA Championships
Akron	John Groce	Illinois	6	274–190 (.591)	94–59 (.614)	54–38 (.587)	1	1	1	0	0
Ball State	Michael Lewis	UCLA (asst.)	1	0–0 (–)	0–0 (–)	0–0 (–)	0	0	0	0	0
Bowling Green	Michael Huger	Miami (FL) (asst.)	8	115–105 (.523)	115–105 (.523)	59–69 (.461)	0	0	0	0	0
Buffalo	Jim Whitesell	Buffalo (assoc. HC)	4	430–340 (.558)	55–32 (.632)	36–18 (.667)	0	0	0	0	0
Central Michigan	Tony Barbee	Kentucky (asst.)	2	138–150 (.479)	7–23 (.233)	6–12 (.333)	0	0	0	0	0
Eastern Michigan	Stan Heath	Lakeland Magic	2	219–228 (.490)	10–21 (.323)	5–15 (.250)	0	0	0	0	0
Kent State	Rob Senderoff	Kent State (asst.)	12	219–140 (.610)	219–140 (.610)	115–81 (.587)	1	1	1	0	0
Miami	Travis Steele	Xavier	1	70–50 (.583)	0–0 (–)	0–0 (–)	0	0	0	0	0
Northern Illinois	Rashon Burno	Arizona State (asst.)	2	9–21 (.300)	9–21 (.300)	6–14 (.300)	0	0	0	0	0
Ohio	Jeff Boals	Stony Brook	4	114–75 (.603)	59–33 (.641)	31–21 (.596)	0	1	1	0	0
Toledo	Tod Kowalczyk	Green Bay	13	367–272 (.574)	231–160 (.591)	126–87 (.592)	3	0	0	0	0
Western Michigan	Dwayne Stephens	Michigan State (assoc. HC)	1	0–0 (–)	0–0 (–)	0–0 (–)	0	0	0	0	0

Notes:

- Appearances, titles, etc. are from time with current school only.
- Years at school includes 2022–23 season.
- MAC records are from time at current school only.
- All records are through the beginning of the season.

== Preseason ==
The preseason coaches' poll and league awards were announced by the league office on October 26, 2022. Kent State was named as a slight MAC favorite over 2021–22 regular season champion Toledo and 2022 MAC tournament champion Akron.

=== Preseason men's basketball coaches poll ===
Men's basketball preseason poll
Place	Team	Points	First place votes
1.	Kent State	135	6
2.	Toledo	131	4
3.	Akron	127	2
4.	Ball State	94	--
5.	Ohio	91	--
6.	Buffalo	82	--
7.	Eastern Michigan	68	--
8.	Western Michigan	66	--
9.	Bowling Green	42	--
10.	Central Michigan	38	--
11.	Miami	36	--
12.	Northern Illinois	26	--

=== MAC Preseason All-Conference ===
Honor	Recipient
Preseason All-MAC First Team	Enrique Freeman, F, Akron, Jr.
Preseason All-MAC First Team	Payton Sparks, C, Ball State, So.
Preseason All-MAC First Team	Sincere Carry, G, Kent State, R-Sr.
Preseason All-MAC First Team	JT Shumate, F, Toledo, Sr.
Preseason All-MAC First Team	Lamar Norman Jr., G, Western Michigan, Sr.
Preseason All-MAC Second Team	Xavier Castaneda, G, Akron, Sr.
Preseason All-MAC Second Team	Kevin Miller, G, Central Michigan, So
Preseason All-MAC Second Team	Emoni Bates, F, Eastern Michigan, So.
Preseason All-MAC Second Team	Malique Jacobs, G, Kent State, R-Sr.
Preseason All-MAC Second Team	Setric Millner Jr., F, Toledo, Sr.

== Regular season ==
=== Rankings ===
		Pre	Wk 2	Wk 3	Wk 4	Wk 5	Wk 6	Wk 7	Wk 8	Wk 9	Wk 10	Wk 11	Wk 12	Wk 13	Wk 14	Wk 15	Wk 16	Wk 17	Wk 18	Wk 19	Final
Akron	AP																				
Akron	C																				
Ball State	AP																				
Ball State	C																				
Bowling Green	AP																				
Bowling Green	C																				
Buffalo	AP																				
Buffalo	C																				
Central Michigan	AP																				
Central Michigan	C																				
Eastern Michigan	AP																				
Eastern Michigan	C																				
Kent State	AP											RV	RV							RV	
Kent State	C												RV							RV	
Miami	AP																				
Miami	C																				
Northern Illinois	AP																				
Northern Illinois	C																				
Ohio	AP																				
Ohio	C																				
Toledo	AP																		RV		
Toledo	C																	RV	RV		
Western Michigan	AP																				
Western Michigan	C																				

Legend
	Improvement in ranking
	Drop in ranking
	Not ranked previous week
	No change in ranking from previous week
RV	Received votes but were not ranked in Top 25 of poll
т	Tied with team above or below also with this symbol

=== Conference matrix ===
	Akron	Ball State	Bowling Green	Buffalo	Central Michigan	Eastern Michigan	Kent State	Miami (OH)	Northern Illinois	Ohio	Toledo	Western Michigan
vs. Akron	—	1–1	0–1	0–2	0–1	0–2	1–1	0–1	0–1	1–1	2–0	0–2
vs. Ball State	1–1	—	0–2	1–0	0–1	1–1	1–1	0–1	0–2	1–0	1–1	1–1
vs. Bowling Green	1–0	2–0	—	1–0	1–1	0–2	2–0	1–1	1–0	1–1	2–0	1–0
vs. Buffalo	2–0	0–1	0–1	—	1–1	0–1	2–0	1–1	0–2	1–1	2–0	0–1
vs. Central Michigan	1–0	1–0	1–1	1–1	—	1–0	1–0	0–2	2–0	2–0	2–0	1–1
vs. Eastern Michigan	2–0	1–1	2–0	1–0	0–1	—	2–0	0–1	2–0	0–1	2–0	1–1
vs. Kent State	1–1	1–1	0–2	0–2	0–1	0–2	—	0–1	1–0	0–2	0–1	0–2
vs. Miami (OH)	1–0	1–0	1–1	1–1	2–0	1–0	1–0	—	1–1	1–1	2–0	0–2
vs. Northern Illinois	1–0	2–0	0–1	2–0	0–2	0–2	0–1	1–1	—	2–0	1–0	0–2
vs. Ohio	1–1	0–1	1–1	1–1	0–2	1–0	2–0	1–1	0–2	—	1–0	0–1
vs. Toledo	0–2	1–1	0–2	0–2	0–2	0–2	1–0	0–2	0–1	0–1	—	0–1
vs. Western Michigan	2–0	1–1	0–1	1–0	1–1	1–1	2–0	2–0	2–0	1–0	1–0	—
Total	13–5	11–7	5–13	9–9	5–13	5–13	15–3	6–12	9–9	10–8	16–2	4–14

== All-MAC awards ==
=== Mid-American men's basketball weekly awards ===
Week	Player(s) of the Week	School
Nov 14	RayJ Dennis	Toledo
Nov 21	JT Shumate and Malique Jacobs	Toledo and Kent State
Nov 28	Payton Sparks and Miles Brown	Ball State and Ohio
Dec 5	Curtis Jones	Buffalo
Dec 12	RayJ Dennis	Toledo
Dec 19	Jaylin Sellers	Ball State
Dec 26	Sincere Carry	Kent State
Jan 2	Reggie Bass	Central Michigan
Jan 9	Enrique Freeman	Akron
Jan 16	Miryne Thomas	Kent State
Jan 23	RayJ Dennis	Toledo
Jan 30	Enrique Freeman	Akron
Feb 6	Xavier Castaneda	Akron
Feb 13	Jaylin Hunter and Tyson Acuff	Ohio and Eastern Michigan
Feb 20	Enrique Freeman and RayJ Dennis	Akron and Toledo
Feb 27	Emoni Bates and Mekhi Lairy	Eastern Michigan and Miami
Mar 6	RayJ Dennis and Sincere Carry	Toledo and Kent State

== Postseason ==
=== Mid–American Tournament ===
Kent State defeated Toledo in the final to earn the conference's automatic bid to the 2023 NCAA tournament. Sincere Carry was the MVP.

=== NCAA tournament ===
Kent State was placed as the 13th seed in the Midwest Regional where they lost to Indiana in the first round of the NCAA tournament.

=== National Invitation tournament ===
Toledo received an automatic bid to the National Invitation tournament where they lost to Michigan in the first round.

=== Postseason awards ===
RayJ Dennis was the unanimous selection for player of the year.

1. Coach of the Year: Tod Kowalczyk, Toledo
2. Player of the Year: RayJ Dennis, Toledo
3. Freshman of the Year: Reggie Bass, Central Michigan
4. Defensive Player of the Year: Malique Jacobs, Kent State
5. Sixth Man of the Year: Jalen Sullinger, Kent State

=== Honors ===
Honor	Recipient
Postseason All-MAC First Team	Xavier Castaneda, Sr., G, Akron
Postseason All-MAC First Team	Enrique Freeman, Jr., F, Akron
Postseason All-MAC First Team	Sincere Carry, R-Sr., G, Kent State
Postseason All-MAC First Team	RayJ Dennis, Jr., G, Toledo
Postseason All-MAC First Team	JT Shumate, Sr., F, Toledo
Postseason All-MAC Second Team	Payton Sparks, So., C, Ball State
Postseason All-MAC Second Team	Jarron Coleman, R-Jr., G, Ball State
Postseason All-MAC Second Team	Malique Jacobs, R-Sr., G, Kent State
Postseason All-MAC Second Team	Setric Millner Jr., Sr., F, Toledo
Postseason All-MAC Second Team	Dwight Wilson III, Grad., F, Ohio
Postseason All-MAC Third Team	Jaylin Sellers, So., G, Ball State
Postseason All-MAC Third Team	Curtis Jones, So., G, Buffalo
Postseason All-MAC Third Team	Emoni Bates, So., F, Eastern Michigan
Postseason All-MAC Third Team	Mekhi Lairy, 5th, G, Miami
Postseason All-MAC Third Team	David Coit, So., G, Northern Illinois
Postseason All-MAC Honorable Mention	Leon Ayers III, Sr., G, Bowling Green
Postseason All-MAC Honorable Mention	Anderson Mirambeaux, Sr., F, Miami
Postseason All-MAC Honorable Mention	Kaleb Thornton, Sr., G, Northern Illinois
Postseason All-MAC Honorable Mention	Jaylin Hunter, Jr., G, Ohio
Postseason All-MAC Honorable Mention	Lamar Norman Jr., Sr., G, Western Michigan
All-MAC Freshman Team	Reggie Bass, Central Michigan, G
All-MAC Freshman Team	Ryan Mabrey, Miami, G
All-MAC Freshman Team	AJ Brown, Ohio, G
All-MAC Freshman Team	Elmore James, Ohio, G
All-MAC Freshman Team	Seth Hubbard, Western Michigan, G
All-MAC Defensive Team	Enrique Freeman, Akron
All-MAC Defensive Team	Greg Tribble, Jr., G, Akron
All-MAC Defensive Team	Demarius Jacobs, Sr., G, Ball State
All-MAC Defensive Team	Malique Jacobs, Kent State
All-MAC Defensive Team	Sincere Carry, Kent State

== See also ==
- 2022–23 Mid-American Conference women's basketball season
