= 2022–23 Bowling Green Falcons men's basketball team =

American college basketball season

2022–23 Bowling Green Falcons men's basketball
- Conference: Mid-American Conference
- Record: 11–20 (5–13 MAC)
- Head coach: Michael Huger (8th season)
- Assistant coaches: Kevin Noon (7th season); Brandon Watkins (3rd season); Steven Wright (3rd season)
- Home arena: Stroh Center

2022–23 Mid-American Conference men's basketball standings
	Conf.				Overall
Team	W		L	PCT	W		L	PCT
Toledo	16	–	2	.889	27	–	8	.771
Kent State †	15	–	3	.833	28	–	7	.800
Akron	13	–	5	.722	22	–	11	.667
Ball State	11	–	7	.611	20	–	12	.625
Ohio	10	–	8	.556	19	–	14	.576
Buffalo	9	–	9	.500	15	–	17	.469
Northern Illinois	9	–	9	.500	13	–	19	.406
Miami (OH)	6	–	12	.333	12	–	20	.375
Bowling Green	5	–	13	.278	11	–	20	.355
Eastern Michigan	5	–	13	.278	8	–	23	.258
Central Michigan	5	–	13	.278	10	–	21	.323
Western Michigan	4	–	14	.222	8	–	23	.258
† 2023 MAC tournament winner

The 2022–23 Bowling Green Falcons men's basketball team represented Bowling Green State University in the 2022–23 NCAA Division I men's basketball season. The Falcons, led by Michael Huger in his eighth year as head coach, played their home games at the Stroh Center in Bowling Green, Ohio as members of the Mid-American Conference. They finished the season 11–20, 5–13 in MAC play to finish in a three-way tie for ninth place. They failed to qualify for the MAC tournament.

On March 5, 2023, the school fired head coach Michael Huger. On March 15, the school named Southern Utah head coach Todd Simon the team's new coach.

== Previous season ==
The Falcons finished the 2021–22 season 13–18, 6–14 in MAC play to finish in ninth place. They failed to qualify for the MAC tournament.

== Offseason ==
=== Departures ===
Departures
Name	Pos.	Height	Weight	Year	Hometown	Notes
Caleb Fields	G	6'2	185	Junior	Cape May Court House, New Jersey	Transferred to Fairfield
Josiah Fulcher	G	6'3	180	Freshman	Lima, Ohio	Transferred to Clarendon College
Joe Reece	F	6'8	200	Junior	St. Louis, Missouri	Transferred to Duquesne
Cam Young	G	6'7	210	Freshman	Swedesboro, New Jersey	Transferred to St. Peter's
Daeqwon Plowden	G/F	6'6	215	Senior	Philadelphia, Pennsylvania	Exhausted Eligibility
Matiss Kulackovskis	F	6'9	215	RS-Senior	Saldus, Latvia	
Trey Diggs	G/F	6'6	210	Grad	Niceville, Florida	
Myron Gordon	G	6'3	180	Grad	Bordentown, New Jersey	

=== Incoming transfers ===
Transfers
Name	Pos.	Height	Weight	Year	Hometown	Previous school
Leon Ayers III	G	6'5	185	Senior	Troy, Michigan	Duquesne
Sam Towns	F	6'9	200	Junior	Columbus, Ohio	Ohio
Madini Diarra	F	6'11	260	Senior	Bamako, Mali	Indian Hills Community College
Rashaun Agee	F	6'8	225	Junior	Chicago, Illinois	Casper College

=== Recruiting class ===
College recruiting information
Name	Hometown	School	Height	Weight	Commit date
Willie Lightfoot; PG	Niagara Falls, New York	North Carolina Good Better Best Academy	6 ft 0 in (1.83 m)	N/A	
Willie Lightfoot; PG	Recruit ratings: Scout: Rivals: 247Sports: (78)				
Anthony McComb III; G	Dayton, Ohio	Trotwood Madison	6 ft 3 in (1.91 m)	180 lb (82 kg)	
Anthony McComb III; G	Recruit ratings: Scout: Rivals: 247Sports: (NR)				
Jamai Felt; F	Boston, Massachusetts	Our Saviour Lutheran	6 ft 9 in (2.06 m)	210 lb (95 kg)	
Jamai Felt; F	Recruit ratings: Scout: Rivals: 247Sports: (NR)				
Overall recruit ranking:
Note: In many cases, Scout, Rivals, 247Sports, On3, and ESPN may conflict in their listings of height and weight.; In these cases, the average was taken. ESPN grades are on a 100-point scale.; Sources: "2022 Team Ranking". Rivals.

== Roster ==
2022–23 Bowling Green Falcons men's basketball team
Players
Coaches

Pos.	#	Name	Height	Weight	Year	Hometown
F	0	Ubongabasi Etim	6 ft 9 in (2.06 m)	210 lb (95 kg)	RS Fr	Richmond, California
G	1	Brenton Mills	6 ft 3 in (1.91 m)	185 lb (84 kg)	Sr	Allen, Texas
G	2	Leon Ayers III	6 ft 5 in (1.96 m)	185 lb (84 kg)	Sr	Troy, Michigan
G	3	Kaden Metheny	5 ft 11 in (1.8 m)	180 lb (82 kg)	So	Morgantown, West Virginia
G	4	Willie Lightfoot	6 ft 0 in (1.83 m)	170 lb (77 kg)	Fr	Niagara Falls, New York
F	5	Rashaun Agee	6 ft 8 in (2.03 m)	225 lb (102 kg)	Jr	Chicago, Illinois
G	10	Anthony McComb III	6 ft 3 in (1.91 m)	180 lb (82 kg)	Fr	Dayton, Ohio
F	11	Jamai Felt	6 ft 9 in (2.06 m)	210 lb (95 kg)	Fr	Boston, Massachusetts
G	12	Isaac Elsasser (W)	6 ft 4 in (1.93 m)	185 lb (84 kg)	Sr	Bowling Green, Ohio
G/F	13	Chandler Turner	6 ft 7 in (2.01 m)	210 lb (95 kg)	Sr	Detroit, Michigan
F	14	Sam Towns	6 ft 9 in (2.06 m)	200 lb (91 kg)	Jr	Columbus, Ohio
G	15	Samari Curtis	6 ft 4 in (1.93 m)	190 lb (86 kg)	Sr	Xenia, Ohio
F	21	Madini Diarra	6 ft 11 in (2.11 m)	260 lb (118 kg)	Sr	Bamako, Mali
F	32	Gabe O'Neal	6 ft 7 in (2.01 m)	240 lb (109 kg)	Sr	Cincinnati, Ohio
G	33	Jackson Watson (W)	6 ft 1 in (1.85 m)	180 lb (82 kg)	So	Libertyville, Illinois

Head coach

- Michael Huger (Bowling Green)

Assistant coach(es)

- Kevin Noon (Rider/Bowling Green)
- Brandon Watkins (Penn State)
- Steve Wright (Bowling Green)

Legend

- (C) Team captain
- (S) Suspended
- (I) Ineligible
- (W) Walk-on
- Injured
- Current redshirt

Roster
Last update: September 8, 2022

== Schedule and results ==
Date time, TV	Rank^{#}	Opponent^{#}	Result	Record	High points	High rebounds	High assists	Site (attendance) city, state
Exhibition
October 28, 2022*; 7:00 p.m., ESPN+		at West Virginia	L 57–73	–	17 – Curtis	10 – Agee	3 – Tied	WVU Coliseum (9,840); Morgantown, WV
November 1, 2022*; 7:00 p.m.		Mansfield	W 79–64	–	14 – Curtis	13 – Agee	6 – Metheny	Stroh Center; Bowling Green, OH
Non-conference regular season
November 7, 2022*; 7:00 p.m., ESPN3		Air Force	W 62–58	1–0	16 – Ayers	7 – Tied	3 – Curtis	Stroh Center (1,389); Bowling Green, OH
November 11, 2022*; 7:00 p.m., ESPN+		at Oakland	W 87–82	2–0	26 – Ayers	10 – Turner	7 – Curtis	Athletics Center O'rena (2,459); Rochester, MI
November 15, 2022*; 7:00 p.m., TBA		at Wright State	L 71–80	2–1	22 – Ayers	6 – Tied	5 – Curtis	Nutter Center (3,540); Dayton, OH
November 19, 2022*; 2:00 p.m., ESPN+		at St. Bonaventure; Gotham Classic	L 68–81	2–2	18 – Ayers	7 – Ayers	4 – Curtis	Reilly Center (3,189); Olean, NY
November 22, 2022*; 6:30 p.m., ACCN		at Notre Dame; Gotham Classic	L 66–82	2–3	14 – Curtis	9 – Agee	3 – Metheny	Joyce Center (4,863); South Bend, IN
November 26, 2022*; 2:00 p.m., ESPN+		Southern Indiana; Gotham Classic	L 57–69	2–4	12 – Turner	7 – Turner	5 – Metheny	Stroh Center (1,199); Bowling Green, OH
November 29, 2022*; 7:00 p.m., ESPN+		Queens (NC)	L 66–72	2–5	16 – Curtis	8 – Turner	4 – Ayers III	Stroh Center (1,321); Bowling Green, OH
December 3, 2022*; 2:00 p.m., ESPN3		Morgan State	W 86–76	3–5	22 – Ayers	9 – Agee	3 – Tied	Stroh Center (1,365); Bowling Green, OH
December 11, 2022*; 4:00 p.m., FloHoops		at Hampton	W 86–72	4–5	14 – Tied	8 – Agee	7 – Curtis	Hampton Convocation Center (2,103); Hampton, VA
December 14, 2022*; 7:00 p.m.		at Norfolk State	L 75–81	4–6	28 – Metheny	6 – Agee	10 – Curtis	Joseph G. Echols Memorial Hall (782); Norfolk, VA
December 17, 2022*; 2:00 p.m., ESPN3		UT Martin	L 67–75	4–7	15 – Ayers	8 – Agee	4 – Lightfoot	Stroh Center (1,439); Bowling Green, OH
December 19, 2022*; 11:00 a.m.		Fairmont State	W 93–74	5–7	20 – Ayers	8 – Ayers	9 – Curtis	Stroh Center (2,618); Bowling Green, OH
December 29, 2022*; 5:00 p.m.		Ohio Dominican	W 102–65	6–7	30 – Ayers	10 – Towns	6 – Ayers	Stroh Center (1,662); Bowling Green, OH
MAC regular season
January 3, 2023; 7:00 p.m., ESPN+		at Eastern Michigan	W 91–65	7–7 (1–0)	24 – Ayers	10 – Turner	7 – Curtis	George Gervin GameAbove Center (2,305); Ypsilanti, MI
January 7, 2023; 5:00 p.m., ESPN3		Ohio	W 88–79	8–7 (2–0)	25 – Metheny	10 – Towns	7 – Curtis	Stroh Center; Bowling Green, OH
January 10, 2023; 7:00 p.m., ESPN+		Akron	L 70–74	8–8 (2–1)	19 – Ayers	6 – Tied	6 – Metheny	Stroh Center (1,844); Bowling Green, OH
January 14, 2023; 1:00 p.m., ESPN+		at Western Michigan	L 92–108	8–9 (2–2)	21 – Ayers	8 – Agee	8 – Ayers	University Arena (1,940); Kalamazoo, MI
January 17, 2023; 7:00 p.m., ESPN+		at Buffalo	L 71–100	8–10 (2–3)	23 – Ayers	8 – Tied	4 – Tied	Alumni Arena (1,565); Buffalo, NY
January 21, 2023; 5:00 p.m., ESPN3		Miami (OH)	W 83–73	9–10 (3–3)	31 – Ayers	8 – Turner	4 – Ayers	Stroh Center (2,246); Bowling Green, OH
January 24, 2023; 7:00 p.m., ESPN+		at Central Michigan	W 83–61	10–10 (4–3)	24 – Ayers	7 – Turner	3 – Tied	McGuirk Arena (1,383); Mount Pleasant, MI
January 28, 2023; 2:00 p.m., ESPN3		at Toledo	L 77–91	10–11 (4–4)	21 – Ayers	10 – Turner	8 – Ayers	Savage Arena (6,922); Toledo, OH
January 31, 2023; 7:00 p.m., ESPN+		Ball State	L 60–69	10–12 (4–5)	14 – Ayers	8 – Agee	3 – Ayers	Stroh Center (2,028); Bowling Green, OH
February 4, 2023; 5:00 p.m., ESPN3		Northern Illinois	L 78–86	10–13 (4–6)	21 – Turner	6 – Mills	5 – Curtis	Stroh Center (1,884); Bowling Green, OH
February 7, 2023; 7:00 p.m., ESPN+		at Kent State	L 64–87	10–14 (4–7)	19 – Metheny	5 – Towns	2 – Tied	MAC Center (1,695); Kent, OH
February 11, 2023; 2:00 p.m., ESPN+		at Ball State	L 72–93	10–15 (4–8)	20 – Curtis	7 – Turner	2 – Metheny	Worthen Arena (4,808); Muncie, IN
February 14, 2023; 7:00 p.m., ESPN+		Central Michigan	L 74–77	10–16 (4–9)	19 – Metheny	7 – Turner	7 – Curtis	Stroh Center (1,510); Bowling Green, OH
February 18, 2023; 5:00 p.m., ESPN3		Toledo	L 86–91	10–17 (4–10)	18 – Curtis	7 – Mills	7 – Metheny	Stroh Center (4,151); Bowling Green, OH
February 21, 2023; 7:00 p.m., ESPN+		at Miami (OH)	L 65–74	10–18 (4–11)	17 – Curtis	9 – Ayers	6 – Ayers	Millett Hall (1,820); Oxford, OH
February 25, 2023; 5:00 p.m., ESPN3		Kent State	L 69–79	10–19 (4–12)	11 – Tied	9 – Mills	3 – Tied	Stroh Center (2,194); Bowling Green, OH
February 28, 2023; 7:00 p.m., ESPN+		Eastern Michigan	W 88–68	11–19 (5–12)	25 – Curtis	11 – Agee	5 – Curtis	Stroh Center (2,123); Bowling Green, OH
March 3, 2023; 8:00 p.m., CBSSN		at Ohio	L 58–92	11–20 (5–13)	11 – Tied	10 – Etim	3 – Metheny	Convocation Center (7,053); Athens, OH
*Non-conference game. ^{#}Rankings from AP Poll. (#) Tournament seedings in parentheses. All times are in Eastern Time.
