= 2022–23 Buffalo Bulls men's basketball team =

American college basketball season

2022–23 Buffalo Bulls men's basketball
- Conference: Mid-American Conference
- Record: 15–17 (9–9 MAC)
- Head coach: Jim Whitesell (4th season)
- Assistant coaches: Jamie Quarles (6th season); Angres Thorpe (4th season); Brendan Foley (3rd season)
- Home arena: Alumni Arena

2022–23 Mid-American Conference men's basketball standings
	Conf.				Overall
Team	W		L	PCT	W		L	PCT
Toledo	16	–	2	.889	27	–	8	.771
Kent State †	15	–	3	.833	28	–	7	.800
Akron	13	–	5	.722	22	–	11	.667
Ball State	11	–	7	.611	20	–	12	.625
Ohio	10	–	8	.556	19	–	14	.576
Buffalo	9	–	9	.500	15	–	17	.469
Northern Illinois	9	–	9	.500	13	–	19	.406
Miami (OH)	6	–	12	.333	12	–	20	.375
Bowling Green	5	–	13	.278	11	–	20	.355
Eastern Michigan	5	–	13	.278	8	–	23	.258
Central Michigan	5	–	13	.278	10	–	21	.323
Western Michigan	4	–	14	.222	8	–	23	.258
† 2023 MAC tournament winner

The 2022–23 Buffalo Bulls men's basketball team represented the University at Buffalo in the 2022–23 NCAA Division I men's basketball season. The Bulls, led by fourth-year head coach Jim Whitesell, played their home games at Alumni Arena in Amherst, New York as members of the Mid-American Conference. They finished the season 15–17, 9–9 in MAC play to finish in a tie for sixth place. As the No. 6 seed in the MAC tournament they lost to Akron in the quarterfinals.

On March 11, 2023, the school fired head coach Jim Whitesell. On March 30, the school named longtime Villanova assistant coach George Halcovage the team's new head coach.

== Previous season ==
The Bulls finished the 2021–22 season 19–11 and 13–6 in MAC play to finish in fifth place. They lost to Akron in the first round of the MAC tournament.

== Offseason ==
=== Departures ===
Departures
Name	Number	Pos.	Height	Weight	Year	Hometown	Reason
Ty Perry	20	G	6'3"	210	Junior	Boston, Massachusetts	Transferred to New Haven
Lucas Saleh	22	F	6'7"	210	Sophomore	Tiburon, California	Transferred to Belmont Abbey College
Tra'Von Fagan	24	F	6'8"	211	RS-Senior	Waterloo, Iowa	Transferred to UMBC
Josh Mballa	34	F	6'7"	220	Junior	Bordeaux, France	Transferred to Mississippi
Brock Bertram	41	C	6'11"	244	Grad Student	Apple Valley, Minnesota	Exhausted Eligibility
Dominic Johnson	21	F	6'5"	223	Grad Student	Windsor, Ontario	
Jamon Bivens	G	23	6'3"	190	RS-Senior	Atlanta, Georgia	
Keishawn Brewton	4	G	6"2"	185	RS-Senior	Spartanburg, South Carolina	Exhausted Eligibility
Ronaldo Segu	10	G	6'0"	165	Senior	Rochester, New York	

=== Incoming transfers ===
Incoming transfers
Name	Number	Pos.	Height	Weight	Year	Hometown	Reason
Kanye Jones	0	G	6'4"	190	Freshman	Orlando, Florida	Transferred from Boston College
Armoni Foster	4	G	6'5"	230	5th	Meadville, Pennsylvania	Transferred from Indiana (PA)
Yazid Powell	13	G	6'4"		Junior	Philadelphia, Pennsylvania	Transferred from Harcum College
Sy Chatman	22	F	6'8"	230	Junior	Minneapolis, Minnesota	Transferred from Illinois State
Isaiah Adams	23	F	6'6"	210	Freshman	Jacksonville, Florida	Transferred from UCF
Jonnivius Smith	24	F	6'9"	200	Freshman	Jacksonville, Florida	Transferred from Seton Hall

=== Recruiting class ===
College recruiting information
Name	Hometown	School	Height	Weight	Commit date
Devin Ceaser; G	Waldorf, Maryland	St. Stephen’s/St. Agnes	6 ft 1 in (1.85 m)	N/A	Aug 7, 2021
Devin Ceaser; G	Recruit ratings: Scout: Rivals: 247Sports: (78)				
Kuluel Mading; F	High Point, North Carolina	The Burlington School	6 ft 9 in (2.06 m)	220 lb (100 kg)	Apr 16, 2021
Kuluel Mading; F	Recruit ratings: Scout: Rivals: 247Sports: (NR)				
Isaac Jack; C	Port Alberni, British Columbia	Fort Erie International Academy	6 ft 11 in (2.11 m)	N/A	
Isaac Jack; C	Recruit ratings: Scout: Rivals: 247Sports: (NR)				
Jaden Slaughter; G	Buffalo, New York	Cheshire Academy	6 ft 5 in (1.96 m)	200 lb (91 kg)	
Jaden Slaughter; G	Recruit ratings: Scout: Rivals: 247Sports: (NR)				
Overall recruit ranking:
Note: In many cases, Scout, Rivals, 247Sports, On3, and ESPN may conflict in their listings of height and weight.; In these cases, the average was taken. ESPN grades are on a 100-point scale.; Sources: "2022 Team Ranking". Rivals.

== Roster ==
2022–23 Buffalo Bulls men's basketball team
Players
Coaches

Pos.	#	Name	Height	Weight	Year	Previous school	Hometown
G	0	Kanye Jones	6 ft 4 in (1.93 m)	190 lb (86 kg)	So	Boston College	Orlando, FL
F	1	LaQuill Hardnett	6 ft 8 in (2.03 m)	205 lb (93 kg)	Sr	Cincinnati	Philadelphia, PA
G	2	Kidtrell Blocker	6 ft 5 in (1.96 m)	165 lb (75 kg)	So	Tennessee Prep	Rochester, NY
G	3	Curtis Jones	6 ft 5 in (1.96 m)	180 lb (82 kg)	So	Indian Hills CC	Minneapolis, MN
G	4	Armoni Foster	6 ft 4 in (1.93 m)	180 lb (82 kg)	GS	Indiana (PA)	Meadville, PA
F	5	Zaakir Williamson	6 ft 7 in (2.01 m)	230 lb (104 kg)	RS Fr	Neumann Goretti HS	Philadelphia, PA
G	10	Devin Ceaser	6 ft 1 in (1.85 m)	172 lb (78 kg)	Fr	St. Stephen’s/St. Agnes	Waldorf, MD
F	11	Kuluel Mading	6 ft 9 in (2.06 m)	208 lb (94 kg)	So	The Burlington School	High Point, NC
G	13	Yazid Powell	6 ft 4 in (1.93 m)	195 lb (88 kg)	Jr	Harcum College	Philadelphia, PA
F	22	Sy Chatman	6 ft 8 in (2.03 m)	227 lb (103 kg)	Sr	Illinois State	Minneapolis, MN
F	23	Isaiah Adam	6 ft 6 in (1.98 m)	210 lb (95 kg)	Jr	UCF	Jacksonville, FL
F	24	Jonnivius Smith	6 ft 9 in (2.06 m)	200 lb (91 kg)	Jr	Seton Hall	Selma, AL
C	31	Isaac Jack	6 ft 11 in (2.11 m)	251 lb (114 kg)	Fr	Fort Erie International Academy	Port Alberni, BC
G	33	Jaden Slaughter	6 ft 5 in (1.96 m)	202 lb (92 kg)	Fr	Cheshire Academy	Buffalo, NY

Head coach

- Jim Whitesell (Luther)

Assistant coach(es)

- Jamie Quarles (Augusta)
- Angres Thorpe (St. Leo)
- Brendan Foley (Kansas State)

Legend

- (C) Team captain
- (S) Suspended
- (I) Ineligible
- (W) Walk-on
- Injured
- Current redshirt

Roster
Last update: January 9, 2022

== Schedule and results ==
Date time, TV	Rank^{#}	Opponent^{#}	Result	Record	High points	High rebounds	High assists	Site (attendance) city, state
Exhibition
October 30, 2022*; 2:30 p.m., ESPN+		Daemen	W 95–66	–	16 – C. Jones	7 – Powell	8 – Powell	Alumni Arena (1,531); Amherst, NY
Non-conference regular season
November 7, 2022*; 7:00 p.m., ESPN+		Colgate	W 88–87	1–0	24 – Powell	8 – Smith	6 – C. Jones	Alumni Arena (1,841); Amherst, NY
November 12, 2022*; 1:00 p.m., ESPN+		James Madison	L 67–92	1–1	13 – Jones	6 – Jones	2 – Tied	Alumni Arena (1,949); Amherst, NY
November 15, 2022*; 7:00 p.m., CBSSN		at No. 25 UConn	L 64–84	1–2	11 – Tied	6 – Powell	3 – C. Jones	XL Center (10,112); Hartford, CT
November 18, 2022*; 1:00 p.m., ESPN3		vs. Drake; Paradise Jam Quarterfinals	L 72–80	1–3	26 – Hardnett	12 – Hardnett	3 – C. Jones	Sports and Fitness Center; Saint Thomas, U.S. Virgin Islands
November 19, 2022*; 3:15 p.m., ESPN3		vs. Howard; Paradise Jam	L 59–63	1–4	22 – Jones	11 – Hardnett	2 – Tied	Sports and Fitness Center; Saint Thomas, U.S. Virgin Islands
November 21, 2022*; 1:00 p.m., ESPN3		vs. George Mason; Paradise Jam	W 82–74	2–4	24 – Adams	6 – Tied	3 – Tied	Sports and Fitness Center; Saint Thomas, U.S. Virgin Islands
November 27, 2022*; 2:30 p.m., ESPN+		Canisius	W 86–66	3–4	22 – Jones	7 – Smith	5 – Tied	Alumni Arena (1,922); Amherst, NY
December 3, 2022*; 2:30 p.m., ESPN+		at St. Bonaventure	W 83–66	4–4	32 – Jones	9 – Adams	4 – Powell	Reilly Center (4,633); Olean, NY
December 6, 2022*; 6:00 p.m., ESPN+		St. John Fisher	W 91–53	5–4	17 – Ceaser	7 – Jones	6 – Tied	Alumni Arena (1,575); Amherst, NY
December 10, 2022*; 11:30 a.m.		vs. Tulane; Holiday Hoopsgiving	L 63–88	5–5	13 – Hardnett	10 – Tied	2 – Tied	State Farm Arena; Atlanta, GA
December 18, 2022*; 5:00 p.m., ESPN+		at West Virginia	L 78–96	5–6	20 – Adams	6 – Tied	4 – Jones	WVU Coliseum (10,689); Morgantown, WV
December 21, 2022*; 6:00 p.m., ESPN+		SUNY Canton	W 129–62	6–6	25 – Ceaser	13 – Jack	6 – Tied	Alumni Arena (1,497); Amherst, NY
December 30, 2022*; 6:00 p.m., BTN		at Michigan State	L 68–89	6–7	15 – Adams	8 – Smith	5 – Foster	Breslin Center (14,797); East Lansing, MI
MAC regular season
January 3, 2023; 7:00 p.m., ESPN+		Ohio	W 75–72	7–7 (1–0)	20 – Jones	16 – Hardnett	5 – Foster	Alumni Arena (1,621); Amherst, NY
January 7, 2023; 12:00 p.m., ESPN+		Northern Illinois	W 80–62	8–7 (2–0)	19 – Jones	12 – Hardnett	5 – Foster	Alumni Arena (2,030); Amherst, NY
January 10, 2023; 7:00 p.m., ESPN+		at Miami (OH)	L 80–91	8–8 (2–1)	20 – Powell	9 – Jones	3 – Jones	Millett Hall (921); Oxford, OH
January 14, 2023; 4:30 p.m., ESPN3		at Central Michigan	L 78–87 ^{OT}	8–9 (2–2)	20 – Jones	11 – Adams	6 – Foster	McGuirk Arena (1,756); Mount Pleasant, MI
January 17, 2023; 7:00 p.m., ESPN+		Bowling Green	W 100–71	9–9 (3–2)	27 – Powell	10 – Powell	8 – Jones	Alumni Arena (1,565); Amherst, NY
January 20, 2023; 8:30 p.m., CBSSN		Toledo	L 77–86	9–10 (3–3)	18 – Hardnett	12 – Hardnett	7 – Foster	Alumni Arena (2,009); Amherst, NY
January 24, 2023; 7:00 p.m., ESPN+		at Ball State	W 91–65	10–10 (4–3)	27 – Jonee	8 – Hardnett	7 – Foster	Worthen Arena (3,943); Muncie, IN
January 27, 2023; 9:00 p.m., ESPNU		at Kent State	L 68–74	10–11 (4–4)	23 – Adams	12 – Hardnett	5 – Foster	MAC Center (3,021); Kent, OH
January 31, 2023; 7:00 p.m., ESPN+		Akron	L 64–81	10–12 (4–5)	19 – Jones	6 – Jones	5 – Blocker	Alumni Arena (5,001); Amherst, NY
February 4, 2023; 2:30 p.m., ESPN3		at Western Michigan	W 85–76	11–12 (5–5)	30 – Jones	15 – Hardnett	6 – Foster	University Arena (2,007); Kalamazoo, MI
February 7, 2023; 7:00 p.m., ESPN+		Eastern Michigan	W 102–97	12–12 (6–5)	21 – Tied	8 – Tied	11 – Foster	Alumni Arena (4,507); Amherst, NY
February 10, 2023; 6:00 p.m., ESPN2		Kent State	L 65–72	12–13 (6–6)	15 – Powell	8 – Smith	8 – Jones	Alumni Arena (4,207); Amherst, NY
February 14, 2023; 7:00 p.m., ESPN+		at Ohio	L 61–85	12–14 (6–7)	14 – Tied	8 – Smith	3 – Foster	Convocation Center (4,455); Athens, OH
February 18, 2023; 7:00 p.m., ESPN3		at Akron	L 66–86	12–15 (6–8)	12 – Foster	7 – Hardnett	4 – Blocker	James A. Rhodes Arena (2,068); Akron, OH
February 21, 2023; 7:00 p.m., ESPN+		Central Michigan	W 63–35	13–15 (7–8)	14 – Jones	11 – Adams	5 – Tied	Alumni Arena (4,114); Amherst, NY
February 25, 2023; 2:00 p.m., ESPN3		at Toledo	W 101–71	13–16 (7–9)	20 – Tied	6 – Hardnett	5 – Foster	Savage Arena (6,014); Toledo, OH
February 28, 2023; 8:00 p.m., ESPN+		at Northern Illinois	W 85–75	14–16 (8–9)	21 – Jones	8 – Hardnett	4 – Jones	Convocation Center (701); DeKalb, IL
March 3, 2023; 7:00 p.m., ESPN+		Miami (OH)	W 68–63	15–16 (9–9)	16 – Adams	11 – Jack	4 – Tied	Alumni Arena (4,403); Amherst, NY
MAC tournament
March 9, 2023; 6:30 p.m., ESPN+	(6)	vs. (3) Akron; Quarterfinals	L 77–101	15–17	25 – Powell	10 – Hardnett	2 – Tied	Rocket Mortgage FieldHouse (3,852); Cleveland, OH
*Non-conference game. ^{#}Rankings from AP Poll. (#) Tournament seedings in parentheses. All times are in Eastern Time.
