= 2022–23 Kent State Golden Flashes men's basketball team =

American college basketball season

2022–23 Kent State Golden Flashes men's basketball

MAC tournament champions

NCAA tournament, First Round
- Conference: Mid-American Conference
- Record: 28–7 (15–3 MAC)
- Head coach: Rob Senderoff (12th season)
- Associate head coach: Julian Sullinger (5th season)
- Assistant coaches: Randal Holt (2nd season); Jon Fleming (1st season)
- Home arena: MAC Center

2022–23 Mid-American Conference men's basketball standings
	Conf.				Overall
Team	W		L	PCT	W		L	PCT
Toledo	16	–	2	.889	27	–	8	.771
Kent State †	15	–	3	.833	28	–	7	.800
Akron	13	–	5	.722	22	–	11	.667
Ball State	11	–	7	.611	20	–	12	.625
Ohio	10	–	8	.556	19	–	14	.576
Buffalo	9	–	9	.500	15	–	17	.469
Northern Illinois	9	–	9	.500	13	–	19	.406
Miami (OH)	6	–	12	.333	12	–	20	.375
Bowling Green	5	–	13	.278	11	–	20	.355
Eastern Michigan	5	–	13	.278	8	–	23	.258
Central Michigan	5	–	13	.278	10	–	21	.323
Western Michigan	4	–	14	.222	8	–	23	.258
† 2023 MAC tournament winner

The 2022–23 Kent State Golden Flashes men's basketball team represented Kent State University in the 2022–23 NCAA Division I men's basketball season. The Golden Flashes, led by 12th-year head coach Rob Senderoff, played their home games at the Memorial Athletic and Convocation Center, also known as the MAC Center, in Kent, Ohio as members of the Mid-American Conference (MAC). As the second seed they defeated Northern Illinois, Akron, and top-seeded Toledo to win the MAC tournament. Kent State was placed as the 13th seed in the Midwest Regional where they lost to Indiana in the first round of the NCAA tournament.

== Previous season ==
The Golden Flashes finished the 2021–22 season 23–11 overall, 16–4 in MAC play, to finish in second place in the conference. They lost to Akron in the final of the MAC tournament.

== Offseason ==
=== Departures ===
Departures
Name	Pos.	Height	Weight	Year	Hometown	Notes
Mike DiGiulio	G	6'0	170	Freshman	Buffalo, New York	Transferred to Canisius
Jeremiah Hernandez	G	6'4	175	RS-Freshman	Chicago, Illinois	Transferred to Southern Indiana
DeVale Johnson	F	6'7	185	RS-Junior	Brooklyn, New York	Entered transfer portal
Jon King	F	6'5	195	Sophomore	Akron, Ohio	Entered transfer portal
Jarred Logan	F	6'5	199	Freshman	Elyria, Ohio	Entered transfer portal
Tervell Beck	F	6'7	231	RS-Senior	Cleveland, Ohio	Exhausted eligibility
Justyn Hamilton	F	6'11	208	RS-Senior	Charlotte, North Carolina	Exhausted eligibility
Andrew Garcia	G	6'5	224	Grad	Harlem, New York	Exhausted eligibility

=== Incoming transfers ===
Transfers
Name	Pos.	Height	Weight	Year	Hometown	Previous school
Mike Bekelja	G	6'1	180	Freshman	Solon, Ohio	Duquesne
Miryne Thomas	F	6'8	215	RS-Junior	Cleveland, Ohio	Ball State
Robert Carpenter	F	6'7	210	Junior	Detroit, Michigan	Mississippi Valley State

=== Recruiting class ===
College recruiting information
Name	Hometown	School	Height	Weight	Commit date
Brendon Moss; SG	Rockford, Illinois		6 ft 4 in (1.93 m)	185 lb (84 kg)	
Brendon Moss; SG	Recruit ratings: Scout: Rivals: 247Sports: (NR)				
Magnus Entenmann; F	Columbus, Ohio		6 ft 9 in (2.06 m)	210 lb (95 kg)	
Magnus Entenmann; F	Recruit ratings: Scout: Rivals: 247Sports: (NR)				
London Maiden; C	Cleveland, Ohio		6 ft 9 in (2.06 m)	N/A	
London Maiden; C	Recruit ratings: Scout: Rivals: 247Sports: (NR)				
Delrecco Gillespie; F	Benton Harbor, Michigan		6 ft 8 in (2.03 m)	215 lb (98 kg)	
Delrecco Gillespie; F	Recruit ratings: Scout: Rivals: 247Sports: (NR)				
Overall recruit ranking:
Note: In many cases, Scout, Rivals, 247Sports, On3, and ESPN may conflict in their listings of height and weight.; In these cases, the average was taken. ESPN grades are on a 100-point scale.; Sources: "2022 Team Ranking". Rivals.

== Roster ==
2022–23 Kent State Golden Flashes men's basketball team
Players
Coaches

Pos.	#	Name	Height	Weight	Year	Hometown
G	0	Julius Rollins	6 ft 5 in (1.96 m)	189 lb (86 kg)	So	Chicago, Illinois
F	1	VonCameron Davis	6 ft 5 in (1.96 m)	216 lb (98 kg)	RS So	Columbus, Ohio
G	2	Malique Jacobs	6 ft 3 in (1.91 m)	194 lb (88 kg)	RS Sr	Wilmington, North Carolina
G	3	Sincere Carry	6 ft 1 in (1.85 m)	185 lb (84 kg)	RS Sr	Solon, Ohio
F	4	Chris Payton	6 ft 7 in (2.01 m)	215 lb (98 kg)	Sr	Bloomington, Illinois
G	5	Brendon Moss	6 ft 4 in (1.93 m)	185 lb (84 kg)	Fr	Rockford, Illinois
G	11	Giovanni Santiago	6 ft 1 in (1.85 m)	164 lb (74 kg)	RS Jr	Bayamón, Puerto Rico
G	13	Jalen Sullinger	5 ft 10 in (1.78 m)	170 lb (77 kg)	So	Columbus, Ohio
F	14	Magnus Entenmann	6 ft 9 in (2.06 m)	210 lb (95 kg)	Fr	Columbus, Ohio
G	15	Mike Bekelja	6 ft 1 in (1.85 m)	180 lb (82 kg)	So	Solon, Ohio
F	21	Robert Carpenter	6 ft 7 in (2.01 m)	210 lb (95 kg)	RS Jr	Detroit, Michigan
C	22	London Maiden	6 ft 9 in (2.06 m)	258 lb (117 kg)	Fr	Cleveland, Ohio
F	23	Delrecco Gillespie	6 ft 8 in (2.03 m)	215 lb (98 kg)	Fr	Benton Harbor, Michigan
F	33	Miryne Thomas	6 ft 8 in (2.03 m)	215 lb (98 kg)	RS Sr	Cleveland, Ohio
F	34	Akeem Odusipe	6 ft 8 in (2.03 m)	225 lb (102 kg)	RS So	Lagos, Nigeria
C	42	Cli'Ron Hornbeak	6 ft 9 in (2.06 m)	224 lb (102 kg)	So	Toledo, Ohio

Head coach

- Rob Senderoff (Albany/Miami (FL))

Assistant coach(es)

- Julian Sullinger (Kent State)
- Randal Holt (Kent State)
- Jon Fleming

Legend

- (C) Team captain
- (S) Suspended
- (I) Ineligible
- (W) Walk-on
- Injured
- Current redshirt

Roster
Last update: September 13, 2022

== Schedule and results ==
Date time, TV	Rank^{#}	Opponent^{#}	Result	Record	High points	High rebounds	High assists	Site (attendance) city, state
Non-conference regular season
November 7, 2022*; 7:00 p.m., ESPN+		at Northern Kentucky	W 79–57	1–0	20 – Carry	13 – Hornbeak	7 – Carry	BB&T Arena (2,785); Highland Heights, KY
November 10, 2022*; 5:00 p.m., ESPN+		Baldwin Wallace	W 76–55	2–0	31 – Carry	8 – Payton	7 – Carry	MAC Center (1,141); Kent, OH
November 14, 2022*; 7:00 p.m., ESPN+		Portland	W 77–65	3–0	21 – Jacobs	10 – Hornbeak	4 – Jacobs	MAC Center (1,575); Kent, OH
November 16, 2022*; 11:00 a.m.		Arkansas–Pine Bluff	W 94–68	4–0	17 – Tied	13 – Thomas	7 – Carry	MAC Center (381); Kent, OH
November 19, 2022*; 2:00 p.m., ESPN+		Chicago State	W 88–59	5–0	17 – Thomas	7 – Hornbeak	5 – Carry	MAC Center (811); Kent, OH
November 23, 2022*; 6:00 p.m., FloHoops		at College of Charleston	L 72–74	5–1	25 – Carry	7 – Davis	5 – Carry	TD Arena (3,954); Charleston, SC
November 26, 2022*; 2:30 p.m., ESPN+		at No. 2 Houston	L 44–49	5–2	14 – Davis	7 – Jacobs	4 – Santiago	Fertitta Center (7,378); Houston, TX
December 2, 2022*; 7:00 p.m., ESPN3		South Dakota State	W 83–62	6–2	23 – Carry	10 – Hornbeak	7 – Jacobs	MAC Center (1,244); Kent, OH
December 5, 2022*; 9:00 p.m.		at No. 18 Gonzaga	L 66–73	6–3	16 – Thomas	5 – Tied	6 – Carry	McCarthey Athletic Center (6,000); Spokane, WA
December 10, 2022*; 3:00 p.m., ESPN+		at Cleveland State	W 67–58	7–3	18 – Jacobs	7 – Jacobs	6 – Carry	Wolstein Center (2,120); Cleveland, OH
December 18, 2022*; 5:00 p.m., ESPN+		Concord	W 106–56	8–3	16 – Carry	8 – Gillespie	7 – Carry	MAC Center (578); Kent, OH
December 21, 2022*; 7:30 p.m., ESPN+		vs. New Mexico State; Sun Bowl Invitational	W 73–63	9–3	17 – Jacobs	9 – Thomas	3 – Carry	Don Haskins Center; El Paso, TX
December 22, 2022*; 9:30 p.m.		at UTEP; Sun Bowl Invitational	W 47–46	10–3	15 – Carry	6 – Carry	3 – Carry	Don Haskins Center (5,705); El Paso, TX
MAC regular season
January 3, 2023; 7:00 p.m., ESPN+		Western Michigan	W 80–72	11–3 (1–0)	18 – Sullinger	8 – Tied	8 – Jacobs	MAC Center (2,113); Kent, OH
January 7, 2023; 3:30 p.m., ESPN3		at Miami (OH)	W 69–66	12–3 (2–0)	31 – Carry	9 – Hornbeak	4 – Jacobs	Millett Hall (4,091); Oxford, OH
January 10, 2023; 7:00 p.m., ESPN+		Toledo	W 75–63	13–3 (3–0)	22 – Thomas	13 – Thomas	5 – Carry	MAC Center (1,626); Kent, OH
January 13, 2023; 6:30 p.m., CBSSN		at Ohio	W 70–65	14–3 (4–0)	17 – Thomas	9 – Thomas	6 – Jacobs	Convocation Center (4,713); Athens, OH
January 17, 2023; 7:00 p.m., ESPN+		at Eastern Michigan	W 77–63	15–3 (5–0)	14 – Tied	8 – Tied	5 – Carry	George Gervin GameAbove Center (2,212); Ypsilanti, MI
January 20, 2023; 6:30 p.m., CBSSN		Ball State	W 86–65	16–3 (6–0)	18 – Curry	9 – Hornbeak	5 – Jacobs	MAC Center (5,660); Kent, OH
January 24, 2023; 7:00 p.m., ESPN+		at Northern Illinois	L 76–86	16–4 (6–1)	17 – Sullinger	7 – Thomas	7 – Carry	Convocation Center (837); DeKalb, IL
January 27, 2023; 9:00 p.m., ESPNU		Buffalo	W 74–68	17–4 (7–1)	24 – Carry	9 – Jacobs	7 – Carry	MAC Center (3,021); Kent, OH
January 31, 2023; 7:00 p.m., ESPN+		Central Michigan	W 81–69	8–14 (3–6)	18 – Payton	12 – Payton	6 – Carry	MAC Center (2,235); Kent, OH
February 3, 2023; 9:00 p.m., ESPNU		at Akron	L 55–67	18–5 (8–2)	15 – Carry	5 – Tied	3 – Tied	James A. Rhodes Arena (5,821); Akron, OH
February 7, 2023; 7:00 p.m., ESPN+		Bowling Green	W 87–64	19–5 (9–2)	17 – Jacobs	6 – Tied	7 – Tied	MAC Center (1,695); Kent, OH
February 10, 2023; 6:00 p.m., ESPN2		at Buffalo	W 72–65	20–5 (10–2)	19 – Miryne	9 – Payton	10 – Carry	Alumni Arena (4,207); Buffalo, NY
February 14, 2023; 7:00 p.m., ESPN+		at Western Michigan	W 82–58	21–5 (11–2)	21 – Davis	7 – Tied	6 – Jacobs	University Arena (1,381); Kalamazoo, MI
February 17, 2023; 6:00 p.m., CBSSN		Eastern Michigan	W 81–54	22–5 (12–2)	17 – Carry	6 – Tied	6 – Carry	MAC Center (2,095); Kent, OH
February 21, 2023; 7:00 p.m., ESPN+		at Ball State	L 70–82	22–6 (12–3)	21 – Carry	6 – Tied	3 – Jacobs	Worthen Arena (5,573); Muncie, IN
February 25, 2023; 5:00 p.m., ESPN3		at Bowling Green	W 79–69	23–6 (13–3)	19 – Jacobs	10 – Davis	7 – Carry	Stroh Center (2,194); Bowling Green, OH
February 28, 2023; 7:00 p.m., ESPN+		Ohio	W 82–75	24–6 (14–3)	23 – Carry	6 – Payton	5 – Jacobs	MAC Center (1,998); Kent, OH
March 3, 2023; 6:00 p.m., ESPNU		Akron	W 89–84 ^{OT}	25–6 (15–3)	35 – Carry	8 – Thomas	4 – Tied	MAC Center (6,327); Kent, OH
MAC tournament
March 9, 2023; 4:00 p.m., ESPN+	(2)	vs. (7) Northern Illinois; Quarterfinals	W 76–57	26–6	19 – Jacobs	14 – Thomas	6 – Carry	Rocket Mortgage FieldHouse (3,852); Cleveland, OH
March 10, 2023; 7:30 p.m., CBSSN	(2)	vs. (3) Akron; Semifinals	W 79–73	27–6	24 – Thomas	10 – Payton	3 – Carry	Rocket Mortgage FieldHouse (9,295); Cleveland, OH
March 11, 2023; 7:30 p.m., ESPN2	(2)	vs. (1) Toledo; Championship	W 93–78	28–6	26 – Carry	13 – Jacobs	6 – Jacobs	Rocket Mortgage FieldHouse (8,375); Cleveland, OH
NCAA tournament
March 17, 2023*; 10:36 p.m., TBS	(13 MW)	vs. (4 MW) No. 21 Indiana; First round	L 60–71	28–7	15 – Carry	9 – Jacobs	7 – Jacobs	MVP Arena (13,989); Albany, NY
*Non-conference game. ^{#}Rankings from AP poll. (#) Tournament seedings in parentheses. All times are in Eastern Time.
