= 2022–23 Ball State Cardinals men's basketball team =

American college basketball season

2022–23 Ball State Cardinals men's basketball
- Conference: Mid-American Conference
- Record: 20–12 (11–7 MAC)
- Head coach: Michael Lewis (1st season)
- Assistant coaches: Ben Botts (5th season); Lou Gudino (1st season); Jamal Meeks (1st season)
- Home arena: Worthen Arena

2022–23 Mid-American Conference men's basketball standings
	Conf.				Overall
Team	W		L	PCT	W		L	PCT
Toledo	16	–	2	.889	27	–	8	.771
Kent State †	15	–	3	.833	28	–	7	.800
Akron	13	–	5	.722	22	–	11	.667
Ball State	11	–	7	.611	20	–	12	.625
Ohio	10	–	8	.556	19	–	14	.576
Buffalo	9	–	9	.500	15	–	17	.469
Northern Illinois	9	–	9	.500	13	–	19	.406
Miami (OH)	6	–	12	.333	12	–	20	.375
Bowling Green	5	–	13	.278	11	–	20	.355
Eastern Michigan	5	–	13	.278	8	–	23	.258
Central Michigan	5	–	13	.278	10	–	21	.323
Western Michigan	4	–	14	.222	8	–	23	.258
† 2023 MAC tournament winner

The 2022–23 Ball State Cardinals men's basketball team represented Ball State University in the 2022–23 NCAA Division I men's basketball season. The Cardinals, led by first-year head coach Michael Lewis, played their home games at Worthen Arena in Muncie, Indiana as members of the Mid-American Conference (MAC). As the fourth seed they lost to Ohio in the quarterfinals of the MAC tournament to finish 20–12 and 11–7 in MAC play.

== Previous season ==
The Cardinals finished the 2021–22 season 14–17, 9–10 in MAC play, to finish in sixth place. They lost to Ohio in the quarterfinals of the MAC tournament.

== Offseason ==
=== Departures ===
Departures
Name	Pos.	Height	Weight	Year	Hometown	Notes
Kani Acree	G	6' 6"	185	Redshirt junior	Carbondale, IL	Entered Transfer Portal
Luke Brown	G	6' 1"	165	Freshman	Carmel, IN	Transferred to Stetson
Tyler Cochran	G	6' 2"	220	Junior	Bolingbrook, IL	Transferred to Toledo
Miryne Thomas	F	6' 8"	200	Redshirt senior	Cleveland, OH	Transferred to Kent State
Blake Huggins	C	6' 10"	245	Redshirt senior	Union City, TN	Exhausted eligibility

=== Incoming transfers ===
Transfers
Name	Pos.	Height	Weight	Year	Hometown	Previous school
Thomas Allen	G	6' 1"	180	RS-JR	Raleigh, NC	North Carolina State
Jarron Coleman	G	6' 5"	210	GS	Indianapolis, IN	Missouri
Darian Owens-White	G	6' 1"	165	GS	Detroit, MI	Wayne State
Kaiyem Cleary	G	6' 6"	185	JR	Manchester, England	Florida SouthWestern State

=== Recruiting class ===
College recruiting information
Name	Hometown	School	Height	Weight	Commit date
Micah Bell; G	Austell, GA	Link Year Prep	6 ft 3 in (1.91 m)	N/A	
Micah Bell; G	Recruit ratings: Scout: Rivals: 247Sports: (NR)				
Jack Futa; G	South Bend, IN	St. Joseph	6 ft 5 in (1.96 m)	195 lb (88 kg)	
Jack Futa; G	Recruit ratings: Scout: Rivals: 247Sports: (NR)				
Quincy Adams Jr. G	Frisco, TX	Hamilton	6 ft 5 in (1.96 m)	180 lb (82 kg)	
Quincy Adams Jr. G	Recruit ratings: Scout: Rivals: 247Sports: (NR)				
Overall recruit ranking:
Note: In many cases, Scout, Rivals, 247Sports, On3, and ESPN may conflict in their listings of height and weight.; In these cases, the average was taken. ESPN grades are on a 100-point scale.; Sources: "2022 Team Ranking". Rivals.

== Roster ==
2022–23 Ball State Cardinals men's basketball team
Players
Coaches

Pos.	#	Name	Height	Weight	Year	Hometown
G	0	Jarron Coleman	6 ft 5 in (1.96 m)	210 lb (95 kg)	RS Jr	Indianapolis, IN
G	1	Demarius Jacobs	6 ft 2 in (1.88 m)	185 lb (84 kg)	Sr	Chicago, IL
G	2	Luke Bumbalough	6 ft 1 in (1.85 m)	180 lb (82 kg)	Jr	New Castle, IN
F	3	Mickey Jr. Pearson	6 ft 7 in (2.01 m)	210 lb (95 kg)	RS So	Lincoln, AL
G	4	Micah Bell	6 ft 3 in (1.91 m)	165 lb (75 kg)	Fr	Austell, GA
C	5	Payton Sparks	6 ft 9 in (2.06 m)	240 lb (109 kg)	So	Winchester, IN
F	11	Basheer Jihad	6 ft 9 in (2.06 m)	220 lb (100 kg)	So	Detroit, MI
G	12	Jaylin Sellers	6 ft 4 in (1.93 m)	180 lb (82 kg)	So	Columbus, GA
G	13	Darian Owens-White	6 ft 1 in (1.85 m)	165 lb (75 kg)	GS	Detroit, MI
G	14	Jack Futa	6 ft 5 in (1.96 m)	195 lb (88 kg)	Fr	South Bend, IN
G	15	Quincy Jr. Adams	6 ft 5 in (1.96 m)	180 lb (82 kg)	Fr	Frisco, TX
G	23	Kaiyem Cleary	6 ft 6 in (1.98 m)	185 lb (84 kg)	Jr	Manchester, England
G	24	Jalen Windham	6 ft 5 in (1.96 m)	180 lb (82 kg)	Jr	Indianapolis, IN
C	34	Ben Hendriks	6 ft 10 in (2.08 m)	215 lb (98 kg)	RS So	Mississauga, ON

Head coach

- Michael Lewis (Indiana)

Assistant coach(es)

- Ben Botts (Purdue Fort Wayne)
- Lou Gudino (Indiana)
- Jamal Meeks (Indiana State)

Legend

- (C) Team captain
- (S) Suspended
- (I) Ineligible
- (W) Walk-on
- Injured
- Current redshirt

Roster
Last update: August 13, 2022

== Schedule and results ==
Date time, TV	Rank^{#}	Opponent^{#}	Result	Record	High points	High rebounds	High assists	Site (attendance) city, state
Exhibition
October 29, 2022*; 2:00 p.m.		DePauw	W 87–60	0–0	22 – Coleman	11 – Pearson	–	Worthen Arena (3,445); Muncie, IN
Non-conference regular season
November 7, 2022*; 7:00 p.m., ESPN3/+		Earlham	W 109–39	1–0	19 – Jacobs	13 – Pearson	6 – Jacobs	Worthen Arena (3,445); Muncie, IN
November 12, 2022*; 2:00 p.m., ESPN+		at Indiana State	L 71–83	1–1	29 – Coleman	10 – Jacobs	4 – Coleman	Hulman Center (3,610); Terre Haute, IN
November 16, 2022*; 7:30 p.m.		at Omaha	W 71–61	2–1	15 – Windham	9 – Coleman	4 – Jacobs	Baxter Arena (2,115); Omaha, NE
November 19, 2022*; 2:00 p.m., ESPN3		IU South Bend	W 86–72	3–1	18 – Sellers	14 – Sellers	5 – Jacobs	Worthen Arena (3,012); Muncie, IN
November 25, 2022*; 12:00 p.m., FloHoops		vs. Vermont; Nassau Championship quarterfinals	L 73–78	3–2	21 – Sellers	7 – Sparks	6 – Coleman	Baha Mar Convention Center (267); Nassau, Bahamas
November 26, 2022*; 12:00 p.m., FloHoops		vs. Missouri State; Nassau Championship consolation 2nd round	W 67–64	4–2	24 – Sparks	12 – Sparks	3 – 2 tied	Baha Mar Convention Center (368); Nassau, Bahamas
November 27, 2022*; 2:30 p.m., FloHoops		vs. San Jose State; Nassau Championship 5th-place game	L 65–67	4–3	14 – 2 tied	10 – Sparks	3 – Sparks	Baha Mar Convention Center (270); Nassau, Bahamas
December 3, 2022*; 2:00 p.m., ESPN+		at Duquesne	L 77–78	4–4	22 – Sellers	12 – Sparks	5 – Coleman	UPMC Cooper Fieldhouse (2,012); Pittsburgh, PA
December 7, 2022*; 8:00 p.m., ESPN+		at Eastern Illinois	W 76–59	5–4	20 – Pearson	9 – Pearson	8 – Coleman	Lantz Arena (1,636); Charleston, IL
December 10, 2022*; 2:00 p.m., ESPN+		Evansville	W 88–69	6–4	20 – Sellers	12 – Sparks	2 – 4 tied	Worthen Arena (3,547); Muncie, IN
December 17, 2022*; 3:30 p.m., ESPN+		vs. Illinois State; Indy Classic	W 83–69	7–4	24 – Sellers	6 – Sparks	7 – Coleman	Gainbridge Fieldhouse; Indianapolis, IN
December 21, 2022*; 7:00 p.m., ESPN+		Georgia Southern	W 58–54	8–4	17 – Sellers	7 – 4 tied	4 – Jacobs	Worthen Arena (3,288); Muncie, IN
December 28, 2022*; 7:00 p.m., ESPN+		Chicago State	W 70–63	9–4	16 – Coleman	8 – Sparks	4 – Sparks	Worthen Arena (3,540); Muncie, IN
MAC regular season
January 3, 2023; 7:00 p.m., CBSSN		at Toledo	W 90–83	10–4 (1–0)	26 – Coleman	10 – Sellers	2 – 6 tied	Savage Arena (4,055); Toledo, OH
January 6, 2023; 8:30 p.m., CBSSN		Akron	W 70–63	11–4 (2–0)	15 – 2 tied	8 – Sparks	4 – Jacobs	Worthen Arena; Muncie, IN
January 10, 2023; 7:00 p.m., ESPN+		at Ohio	L 71–76	11–5 (2–1)	17 – Coleman	8 – Sparks	4 – Coleman	Convocation Center (4,010); Athens, OH
January 14, 2023; 2:00 p.m., ESPN3		Miami	W 75–61	12–5 (3–1)	15 – 2 tied	14 – Sparks	5 – Coleman	Worthen Arena; Muncie, IN
January 17, 2023; 7:00 p.m., ESPN+		Western Michigan	W 71–70	13–5 (4–1)	22 – Coleman	8 – Coleman	7 – Coleman	Worthen Arena (3,799); Muncie, IN
January 20, 2023; 6:30 p.m., CBSSN		at Kent State	L 65–86	13–6 (4–2)	11 – 2 tied	8 – Jacobs	3 – Jacobs	MAC Center (5,660); Kent, OH
January 24, 2023; 7:00 p.m., ESPN+		Buffalo	L 65–91	13–7 (4–3)	27 – Coleman	6 – Pearson	6 – Jacobs	Worthen Arena (3,943); Muncie, IN
January 28, 2023; 4:30 p.m., ESPN3		at Northern Illinois	W 87–69	14–7 (5–3)	20 – Coleman	10 – Sparks	6 – Coleman	Convocation Center (1,438); DeKalb, IL
January 31, 2023; 7:00 p.m., ESPN+		at Bowling Green	W 69–60	15–7 (6–3)	19 – Coleman	10 – Sparks	3 – Jacobs	Stroh Center (2,028); Bowling Green, OH
February 4, 2023; 2:00 p.m., CBSSN		Eastern Michigan	W 91–90	16–7 (7–3)	22 – Sparks	15 – Sparks	8 – Jacobs	Worthen Arena (6,608); Muncie, IN
February 7, 2023; 7:00 p.m., ESPN+		at Central Michigan	W 65–51	17–7 (8–3)	13 – Pearson	10 – Sparks	3 – 2 tied	McGuirk Arena (1,430); Mount Pleasant, MI
February 11, 2023; 2:00 p.m., ESPN3		Bowling Green	W 93–72	18–7 (9–3)	18 – Sparks	8 – Sparks	8 – Bumbalough	Worthen Arena (4,808); Muncie, IN
February 14, 2023; 7:00 p.m., ESPN3/+		Northern Illinois	W 87–77	19–7 (10–3)	20 – Sparks	20 – Sparks	8 – Coleman	Worthen Arena (3,635); Muncie, IN
February 18, 2023; 2:30 p.m., ESPN3		at Western Michigan	L 68–78	19–8 (10–4)	22 – Sellers	8 – Sparks	4 – Coleman	University Arena (2,196); Kalamazoo, MI
February 21, 2023; 7:00 p.m., ESPN+		Kent State	W 82–70	20–8 (11–4)	20 – Sellers	12 – Sparks	8 – Coleman	Worthen Arena (5,573); Muncie, IN
February 25, 2023; 3:30 p.m., ESPN3		at Eastern Michigan	L 68–75	20–9 (11–5)	19 – Jacobs	8 – Jihad	5 – Jacobs	George Gervin GameAbove Center (5,287); Ypsilanti, MI
February 28, 2023; 7:00 p.m., ESPN+		at Akron	L 83–87	20–10 (11–6)	19 – Windham	9 – Sparks	4 – 2 tied	James A. Rhodes Arena (1,912); Akron, OH
March 3, 2023; 6:00 p.m., CBSSN		Toledo	L 81–87	20–11 (11–7)	24 – Sparks	11 – Sparks	6 – Jacobs	Worthen Arena (4,441); Muncie, IN
MAC tournament
March 9, 2023; 1:30 p.m., ESPN+	(4)	vs. (5) Ohio; Quarterfinals	L 70–90	20–12	21 – Sparks	7 – Sparks	5 – 2 tied	Rocket Mortgage FieldHouse (3,852); Cleveland, OH
*Non-conference game. ^{#}Rankings from AP poll. (#) Tournament seedings in parentheses. All times are in Eastern.
