= 2022–23 Miami RedHawks men's basketball team =

American college basketball season

2022–23 Miami RedHawks men's basketball
- Conference: Mid-American Conference
- Record: 12–20 (6–12 MAC)
- Head coach: Travis Steele (1st season)
- Assistant coaches: Rob Summers (1st season); Jonathan Holmes (1st season); Khristian Smith (1st season)
- Home arena: Millett Hall

2022–23 Mid-American Conference men's basketball standings
	Conf.				Overall
Team	W		L	PCT	W		L	PCT
Toledo	16	–	2	.889	27	–	8	.771
Kent State †	15	–	3	.833	28	–	7	.800
Akron	13	–	5	.722	22	–	11	.667
Ball State	11	–	7	.611	20	–	12	.625
Ohio	10	–	8	.556	19	–	14	.576
Buffalo	9	–	9	.500	15	–	17	.469
Northern Illinois	9	–	9	.500	13	–	19	.406
Miami (OH)	6	–	12	.333	12	–	20	.375
Bowling Green	5	–	13	.278	11	–	20	.355
Eastern Michigan	5	–	13	.278	8	–	23	.258
Central Michigan	5	–	13	.278	10	–	21	.323
Western Michigan	4	–	14	.222	8	–	23	.258
† 2023 MAC tournament winner

The 2022–23 Miami RedHawks men's basketball team represented Miami University in the 2022–23 NCAA Division I men's basketball season. The RedHawks, led by first-year head coach Travis Steele, played their home games at Millett Hall in Oxford, Ohio as members of the Mid-American Conference. As the eighth seed in the MAC tournament they lost to Toledo in the first round to finish the season 12–20 and 6–12 in the MAC.

== Previous season ==
The RedHawks finished the season 14–18, 8–12 in MAC play to finish in seventh place. They lost in the quarterfinals of the MAC tournament to Kent State. Following the season, the school parted ways with head coach Jack Owens.

== Offseason ==
=== Departures ===
Departures
Name	Pos.	Height	Weight	Year	Hometown	Notes
Jackson Ames	C	6'11	255	Freshman	Batavia, Ohio	Transferred to Marian
James Beck	F	6'8	215	RS-Junior	Grand Rapids, Michigan	Transferred to New Mexico State
Luka Eller	F	6'7	220	Freshman	Mentor, Ohio	Transferred to John Carroll
Dae Dae Grant	G	6'2	185	Sophomore	Lorain, Ohio	Transferred to Duquesne
Maya White	G	6'1	185	RS-Sophomore	Terre Haute, Indiana	Transferred to UT Tyler
Elijah McNamara	F	6'9	215	Senior	Pickerington, Ohio	
Dalonte Brown	F	6'7	215	Senior	Toledo, Ohio	Exhausted Eligibility
Precious Ayah	F	6'6	240	RS-Senior	Bayelsa State, Nigeria	Exhausted Eligibility
Isaiah Coleman-Lands	G	6'0	165	RS-Senior	Indianapolis, Indiana	Exhausted Eligibility

=== Incoming transfers ===
Transfers
Name	Pos.	Height	Weight	Year	Hometown	Previous school
Julian Lewis	G	6'6	200	Freshman	Ann Arbor, Michigan	Transferred from William & Mary
Anderson Mirambeaux	C	6'8	305	Sophomore	Santo Domingo, Dominican Republic	Transferred from Cleveland State
Morgan Safford	G	6'5	210	RS-Freshman	Columbus, Ohio	Transferred from Wofford

=== Recruiting class ===
College recruiting information
Name	Hometown	School	Height	Weight	Commit date
Mitchell Rylee; F	Fort Mitchell, Kentucky	Covington Catholic	6 ft 8 in (2.03 m)	215 lb (98 kg)	
Mitchell Rylee; F	Recruit ratings: Scout: Rivals: 247Sports: (NR)				
Billy Smith; G	Indianapolis, Indiana	Brebeuf Jesuit	6 ft 7 in (2.01 m)	200 lb (91 kg)	
Billy Smith; G	Recruit ratings: Scout: Rivals: 247Sports: (NR)				
Ryan Mabrey; F	LaPorte, Indiana	LaLumiere	6 ft 5 in (1.96 m)	195 lb (88 kg)	
Ryan Mabrey; F	Recruit ratings: Scout: Rivals: 247Sports: (NR)				
Jaquel Morris; F	Floral Park, New York	Eagle Academy II	6 ft 8 in (2.03 m)	220 lb (100 kg)	
Jaquel Morris; F	Recruit ratings: Scout: Rivals: 247Sports: (NR)				
Eli Yofan; G	Pittsburgh, Pennsylvania	Fox Chapel Area	6 ft 2 in (1.88 m)	180 lb (82 kg)	
Eli Yofan; G	Recruit ratings: Scout: Rivals: 247Sports: (NR)				
Overall recruit ranking:
Note: In many cases, Scout, Rivals, 247Sports, On3, and ESPN may conflict in their listings of height and weight.; In these cases, the average was taken. ESPN grades are on a 100-point scale.; Sources: "2022 Team Ranking". Rivals.

== Roster ==
2022–23 Miami RedHawks men's basketball team
Players
Coaches

Pos.	#	Name	Height	Weight	Year	Hometown
F	0	Javin Etzler	6 ft 8 in (2.03 m)	206 lb (93 kg)	RS Jr	Convoy, Ohio
F	1	Kamari Williams	6 ft 7 in (2.01 m)	170 lb (77 kg)	Jr	Sandy Spring, Maryland
G	2	Mekhi Lairy	5 ft 8 in (1.73 m)	145 lb (66 kg)	GS	Evansville, Indiana
G	3	Julian Lewis	6 ft 6 in (1.98 m)	200 lb (91 kg)	So	Ann Arbor, Michigan
G	4	Bryson Tatum	6 ft 4 in (1.93 m)	180 lb (82 kg)	So	Urbana, Illinois
F	5	Mitchell Rylee	6 ft 8 in (2.03 m)	215 lb (98 kg)	Fr	Fort Mitchell, Kentucky
G	11	Billy Smith	6 ft 7 in (2.01 m)	200 lb (91 kg)	Fr	Indianapolis, Indiana
G	13	Ryan Mabrey	6 ft 5 in (1.96 m)	195 lb (88 kg)	Fr	Belmar, New Jersey
F	15	Jackson Kenyon	6 ft 8 in (2.03 m)	215 lb (98 kg)	Sr	Deerfield, Illinois
F	21	Jaquel Morris	6 ft 8 in (2.03 m)	220 lb (100 kg)	Fr	Floral Park, New York
G	22	Morgan Safford	6 ft 5 in (1.96 m)	210 lb (95 kg)	RS Jr	Columbus, Ohio
G	24	Eli Yofan	6 ft 2 in (1.88 m)	180 lb (82 kg)	Fr	Pittsburgh, Pennsylvania
G	25	Wil Stevens	6 ft 5 in (1.96 m)	185 lb (84 kg)	Sr	Chicago, Illinois
F	35	Curtis Harrison IV	6 ft 7 in (2.01 m)	225 lb (102 kg)	So	Cincinnati, Ohio
F	45	Anderson Mirambeaux	6 ft 8 in (2.03 m)	305 lb (138 kg)	Sr	Santo Domingo, Dominican Republic

Head coach

- Travis Steele (Butler)

Assistant coach(es)

- Rob Summers (West Virginia)
- Jonathan Holmes (North Carolina)
- Khristian Smith (Indiana State)

Legend

- (C) Team captain
- (S) Suspended
- (I) Ineligible
- (W) Walk-on
- Injured
- Current redshirt

Roster
Last update: September 9, 2022

== Schedule and results ==
Date time, TV	Rank^{#}	Opponent^{#}	Result	Record	High points	High rebounds	High assists	Site (attendance) city, state
Non-conference regular season
November 7, 2022*; 8:30 p.m., ESPN3		Evansville	L 74–78	0–1	27 – Mirambeaux	8 – Mirambeaux	5 – Lairy	Millett Hall (2,018); Oxford, OH
November 12, 2022*; 1:00 p.m., ESPN3		Goshen College	W 87–44	1–1	17 – Lewis	12 – Smith	4 – Lairy	Millett Hall (1,143); Oxford, OH
November 14, 2022*; 7:00 p.m., SECN+/ESPN+		at Georgia	L 70–77	1–2	34 – Lairy	5 – Tied	6 – Lewis	Stegeman Coliseum (6,147); Athens, GA
November 17, 2022*; 7:00 p.m., ESPN+		Marshall	L 69–95	1–3	19 – Mirambeaux	6 – Mirambeaux	5 – Lairy	Millett Hall (2,157); Oxford, OH
November 20, 2022*; 5:30 p.m., BTN		vs. No. 12 Indiana; Hoosier Classic	L 56–86	1–4	12 – Tied	7 – Lewis	4 – Lewis	Gainbridge Fieldhouse (8,737); Indianapolis, IN
November 26, 2022*; 1:00 p.m., ESPN3		Little Rock; Hoosier Classic	W 80–67	2–4	25 – Lairy	7 – Safford	6 – Lairy	Millett Hall (804); Oxford, OH
November 29, 2022*; 7:00 p.m., ESPN+		Jackson State; Hoosier Classic	W 95–78	3–4	26 – Safford	7 – Mirambeaux	7 – Mirambeaux	Millett Hall (1,388); Oxford, OH
December 3, 2022*; 1:00 p.m., ESPN3		Indiana State	L 61–88	3–5	13 – Mabrey	9 – Safford	1 – Tied	Millett Hall (1,284); Oxford, OH
December 11, 2022*; 1:00 p.m., ESPN+		Calumet College of St. Joseph	W 85–49	4–5	17 – Safford	7 – Yafan	5 – Lairy	Millett Hall (771); Oxford, OH
December 14, 2022*; 7:00 p.m., ESPN+		at Cincinnati	L 76–103	4–6	20 – Lairy	7 – Mirambeaux	4 – Mirambeaux	Fifth Third Arena (8.976); Cincinnati, OH
December 17, 2022*; 4:00 p.m., ESPN+		at Bellarmine	W 71–67	5–6	30 – Lairy	5 – Tied	5 – Lairy	Freedom Hall (2,691); Louisville, KY
December 22, 2022*; 7:00 p.m., ESPN+		Wright State	L 80–88	5–7	32 – Lairy	7 – Safford	4 – Mirambeaux	Millett Hall (1,055); Oxford, OH
December 29, 2022*; 7:00 p.m., ESPN+		Saint Mary-of-the-Woods College	W 90–51	6–7	19 – Safford	7 – Safford	4 – Lairy	Millett Hall (915); Oxford, OH
MAC regular season
January 3, 2023; 7:00 p.m., ESPN+		at Central Michigan	L 56–68	6–8 (0–1)	20 – Safford	11 – Mirambeaux	6 – Lairy	McGuirk Arena (1,091); Mount Pleasant, MI
January 7, 2023; 3:30 p.m., ESPN3		Kent State	L 66–69	6–9 (0–2)	17 – Lairy	11 – Safford	4 – Lairy	Millett Hall (4,091); Oxford, OH
January 10, 2023; 7:00 p.m., ESPN+		Buffalo	W 91–80	7–9 (1–2)	20 – Lairy	11 – Mirambeaux	11 – Lairy	Millett Hall (921); Oxford, OH
January 14, 2023; 2:00 p.m., ESPN3		at Ball State	L 61–75	7–10 (1–3)	17 – Lairy	9 – Mirambeaux	4 – Safford	Worthen Arena; Muncie, IN
January 21, 2023; 7:00 p.m., ESPN+		Northern Illinois	L 77–81	7–11 (1–4)	27 – Safford	10 – Safford	6 – Lairy	Millett Hall (979); Oxford, OH
January 21, 2023; 5:00 p.m., ESPN3		at Bowling Green	L 73–83	7–12 (1–5)	20 – Safford	5 – Lairy	7 – Lairy	Stroh Center (2,246); Bowling Green, OH
January 24, 2023; 7:00 p.m., ESPN+		at Akron	L 68–73	7–13 (1–6)	16 – Lairy	8 – Mirambeaux	4 – Mirambeaux	James A. Rhodes Arena (1,620); Akron, OH
January 28, 2023; 3:30 p.m., ESPN3		Eastern Michigan	L 69–74	7–14 (1–7)	23 – Lairy	9 – Mirambeaux	4 – Mirambeaux	Millett Hall (3,096); Oxford, OH
January 31, 2023; 7:00 p.m., ESPN+		Toledo	L 78–81	7–15 (1–8)	25 – Safford	11 – Safford	4 – Tied	Millett Hall (1,578); Oxford, OH
February 4, 2023; 2:00 p.m., ESPN3		at Ohio	L 68–78	7–16 (1–9)	24 – Lairy	6 – Mirambeaux	3 – Lairy	Convocation Center (8,322); Athens, OH
February 7, 2023; 7:00 p.m., ESPN+		Western Michigan	W 85–78	8–16 (2–9)	22 – Mirambeaux	5 – Tied	7 – Safford	Millett Hall (1,304); Oxford, OH
February 11, 2023; 3:30 p.m., ESPN3		Central Michigan	L 60–66	8–17 (2–10)	18 – Lairy	5 – Mabrey	4 – Lewis	Millett Hall (5,066); Oxford, OH
February 14, 2023; 7:00 p.m., ESPN+		at Toledo	L 71–89	8–18 (2–11)	12 – Tied	6 – Mirambeaux	6 – Mirambeaux	Savage Arena (4,527); Toledo, OH
February 18, 2023; 3:30 p.m., ESPN3		at Northern Illinois	W 66–65	9–18 (3–11)	18 – Mirambeaux	10 – Safford	5 – Safford	Convocation Center (1,690); DeKalb, IL
February 21, 2023; 7:00 p.m., ESPN+		Bowling Green	W 74–65	10–18 (4–11)	24 – Mirambeaux	8 – Mirambeaux	7 – Lairy	Millett Hall (1,820); Oxford, OH
February 25, 2023; 1:00 p.m., ESPN3		Ohio	W 85–68	11–18 (5–11)	26 – Lairy	7 – Tied	4 – Safford	Millett Hall (2,852); Oxford, OH
February 28, 2023; 7:00 p.m., ESPN+		at Western Michigan	W 77–62	12–18 (6–11)	21 – Lairy	6 – Williams	3 – Tied	University Arena (1,398); Kalamazoo, MI
March 3, 2023; 7:00 p.m., ESPN+		at Buffalo	L 63–68	12–19 (6–12)	18 – Mirambeaux	5 – Safford	7 – Lairy	Alumni Arena (4,403); Buffalo, NY
MAC tournament
March 9, 2023; 11:00 a.m., ESPN+	(8)	vs. (1) Toledo; Quarterfinals	L 75–91	12–20	22 – Safford	8 – Lewis	2 – Safford	Rocket Mortgage FieldHouse (3,852); Cleveland, OH
*Non-conference game. ^{#}Rankings from AP Poll. (#) Tournament seedings in parentheses. All times are in Eastern Time.
