= 2022–23 Northern Illinois Huskies men's basketball team =

American college basketball season

2022–23 Northern Illinois Huskies men's basketball
- Conference: Mid-American Conference
- Record: 13–19 (9–9 MAC)
- Head coach: Rashon Burno (2nd season)
- Assistant coaches: Shane Southwell; Drew Gladstone; Drew Kelly
- Home arena: Convocation Center

2022–23 Mid-American Conference men's basketball standings
	Conf.				Overall
Team	W		L	PCT	W		L	PCT
Toledo	16	–	2	.889	27	–	8	.771
Kent State †	15	–	3	.833	28	–	7	.800
Akron	13	–	5	.722	22	–	11	.667
Ball State	11	–	7	.611	20	–	12	.625
Ohio	10	–	8	.556	19	–	14	.576
Buffalo	9	–	9	.500	15	–	17	.469
Northern Illinois	9	–	9	.500	13	–	19	.406
Miami (OH)	6	–	12	.333	12	–	20	.375
Bowling Green	5	–	13	.278	11	–	20	.355
Eastern Michigan	5	–	13	.278	8	–	23	.258
Central Michigan	5	–	13	.278	10	–	21	.323
Western Michigan	4	–	14	.222	8	–	23	.258
† 2023 MAC tournament winner

The 2022–23 Northern Illinois Huskies men's basketball team represented Northern Illinois University in the 2022–23 NCAA Division I men's basketball season. The Huskies were led by second-year head coach Rashon Burno. They played their home games at the Convocation Center in DeKalb, Illinois as members of the Mid-American Conference (MAC). As the seventh seed in the MAC tournament they lost to Kent State in the first round to finish the season 13–19 and 9–9 in the MAC.

== Previous season ==
The Huskies finished the 2021–22 season 9–21, 6–14 in MAC play, to finish a tie for ninth place. They failed to qualify for the MAC tournament.

== Offseason ==
=== Departures ===
Departures
Name	Number	Pos.	Height	Weight	Year	Hometown	Reason
Trendon Hankerson	1	G	6'2"	185	Senior	Novi, MI	Transferred to Akron
Noah Kon	3	G	6'1"	180	Freshman	Houston, TX	Transferred to Colorado Christian
Montavious Myrick	4	F	6'8"	215	Freshman	Atlanta, GA	Transferred to Southern Union State Community College
Chris Osten	5	F	6'9"	215	Senior	Crowley, LA	Transferred to IUPUI
Chinedu Kingsley Okanu	11	F	6'7"	225	Senior	Lynwood, IL	Transferred to Grand Valley State
Zool Kueth	12	F	6'7"	210	Senior	Gallatin, TN	Transferred to Tennessee State
Adong Makuoi	13	C	6'9"	220	Senior	Edmonton, AB	Transferred to Tennessee State
Edward Manuel	22	G	6'6"	190	Junior	Lake Charles, LA	Transferred to St. Mary's (TX)

=== Incoming transfers ===
Incoming transfers
Name	Number	Pos.	Height	Weight	Year	Hometown	Previous school
Zarique Nutter	2	G	6'6"	190	Sophomore	Newark, NJ	Transferred from Clarendon College (Texas)
Oluwasegun Durosinmi	4	F	6'9"	235	Sophomore	Lagos, Nigeria	Transferred from St. Bonaventure
David Coit	11	G	5'11"	175	Sophomore	Columbus, NJ	Transferred from Atlantic Cape Community College
Harvin Ibarguen	23	F	6'9"	225	Junior	Cali, Colombia	Transferred from Seward County Community College

=== Recruiting class ===
College recruiting information
Name	Hometown	School	Height	Weight	Commit date
Taku Youngblood; G	Yokohama, Japan	St. Thomas More	6 ft 2 in (1.88 m)	185 lb (84 kg)	
Taku Youngblood; G	Recruit ratings: Scout: Rivals: 247Sports: (NR)				
Xavier Amos; F	Chicago, IL	Whitney Young	6 ft 8 in (2.03 m)	210 lb (95 kg)	
Xavier Amos; F	Recruit ratings: Scout: Rivals: 247Sports: (NR)				
Yanic Konan Niederhäuser; F	Fraschels, Switzerland		6 ft 4 in (1.93 m)	185 lb (84 kg)	
Yanic Konan Niederhäuser; F	Recruit ratings: Scout: Rivals: 247Sports: (NR)				
Overall recruit ranking:
Note: In many cases, Scout, Rivals, 247Sports, On3, and ESPN may conflict in their listings of height and weight.; In these cases, the average was taken. ESPN grades are on a 100-point scale.; Sources: "2022 Team Ranking". Rivals.

== Roster ==
2022–23 Northern Illinois Huskies men's basketball team
Players
Coaches

Pos.	#	Name	Height	Weight	Year	Previous school	Hometown
G	0	Keshawn Williams	6 ft 3 in (1.91 m)	175 lb (79 kg)	Jr	Tulsa	Chicago Heights, IL
G	1	Taku Youngblood	6 ft 2 in (1.88 m)	185 lb (84 kg)	Fr	St. Thomas More	Yokohama, Japan
G	2	Zarique Nutter	6 ft 6 in (1.98 m)	190 lb (86 kg)	So	Clarendon College	Newark, NJ
G	3	Kaleb Thornton	6 ft 0 in (1.83 m)	175 lb (79 kg)	Jr	Iowa Western CC	Bolingbrook, IL
F	4	Oluwasegun Durosinmi	6 ft 9 in (2.06 m)	235 lb (107 kg)	So	St. Bonaventure	Lagos, Nigeria
F	5	Xavier Amos	6 ft 8 in (2.03 m)	210 lb (95 kg)	Fr	Whitney Young	Chicago, IL
G	10	Zion Russell	6 ft 0 in (1.83 m)	185 lb (84 kg)	So	National Christian Academy	Upper Marlboro, MD
G	11	David Coit	5 ft 11 in (1.8 m)	175 lb (79 kg)	So	Atlantic Cape Community College	Columbus, NJ
F	14	Yanic Konan Niederhäuser	6 ft 10 in (2.08 m)	215 lb (98 kg)	Fr		Fraschels, Switzerland
F	23	Harvin Ibarguen	6 ft 9 in (2.06 m)	225 lb (102 kg)	Jr	Seward County Community College	Cali, Colombia
G	24	Darweshi Hunter	6 ft 5 in (1.96 m)	200 lb (91 kg)	Sr	Weber State	Cincinnati, OH
F	25	Drew Wiemers	6 ft 4 in (1.93 m)	200 lb (91 kg)	Sr	Benedictine	Coal Valley, IL
G	41	Armandas Plintauskas	6 ft 4 in (1.93 m)	185 lb (84 kg)	RS Fr		Kėdainiai, Lithuania
G	50	Anthony Crump	6 ft 8 in (2.03 m)	215 lb (98 kg)	RS Sr	Middle Tennessee	Inkster, MI

Head coach

- Rashon Burno (DePaul)

Assistant coach(es)

- Shane Southwell (Kansas State)
- Drew Gladstone (DePaul)
- Drew Kelly (Villanova)

Legend

- (C) Team captain
- (S) Suspended
- (I) Ineligible
- (W) Walk-on
- Injured
- Current redshirt

Roster

== Schedule and results ==
Date time, TV	Rank^{#}	Opponent^{#}	Result	Record	High points	High rebounds	High assists	Site (attendance) city, state
Exhibition
October 31, 2022*; 7:00 p.m., TBA		McKendree	W 79–76	–	23 – Williams	8 – Crump	4 – tied	Convocation Center (467); DeKalb, IL
Non-conference regular season
November 7, 2022*; 7:00 p.m., ESPN3		Illinois–Springfield	L 77–83	0–1	31 – Coit	5 – tied	4 – Thornton	Convocation Center (651); DeKalb, IL
November 11, 2022*; 7:00 p.m., BTN+		at Northwestern	L 46–63	0–2	19 – Williams	8 – Nutter	2 – Thornton	Welsh–Ryan Arena (3,077); Evanston, IL
November 14, 2022*; 7:00 p.m., ESPN+		Purdue Northwest	W 99–73	1–2	20 – Nutter	7 – tied	7 – Williams	Convocation Center (513); DeKalb, IL
November 17, 2022*; 7:00 p.m., ACCN		at Georgia Tech; Rocket Mortgage Fort Myers Tip-Off	L 50–68	1–3	18 – Nutter	15 – Nutter	3 – tied	McCamish Pavilion (3,269); Atlanta, GA
November 22, 2022*; 11:00 a.m.		vs. Sam Houston State; Rocket Mortgage Fort Myers Tip-Off	L 54–88	1–4	11 – Nutter	8 – Crump	2 – Coit	Suncoast Credit Union Arena (244); Fort Myers, FL
November 22, 2022*; 11:00 a.m.		vs. LIU; Rocket Mortgage Fort Myers Tip-Off	W 86–61	2–4	28 – Williams	11 – Durosinmi	11 – Thornton	Suncoast Credit Union Arena (314); Fort Myers, FL
November 26, 2022*; 1:00 p.m., ESPN+		at Northern Iowa	L 76–83	2–5	28 – Williams	5 – tied	3 – Williams	McLeod Center (3,378); Cedar Falls, IA
November 30, 2022*; 7:00 p.m., ESPN+		at Eastern Illinois	W 90–70	3–5	17 – Williams	5 – tied	5 – Coit	Lantz Arena (1,651); Charleston, IL
December 2, 2022*; 8:00 p.m., ESPN+		at Idaho	L 47–84	3–6	10 – Williams	7 – Williams	3 – Thornton	ICCU Arena (1,476); Moscow, ID
December 12, 2022*; 8:00 p.m.		at No. 15 Gonzaga	L 67–88	3–7	25 – Williams	8 – tied	3 – tied	McCarthey Athletic Center (6,000); Spokane, WA
December 17, 2022*; 3:00 p.m., ESPN+		at VCU	L 63–90	3–8	16 – Williams	8 – Nutter	3 – Williams	Siegel Center (6,817); Richmond, VA
December 20, 2022*; 1:00 p.m., ESPN+		Albany	L 78–83	3–9	24 – Coit	6 – Hunter	6 – Thornton	Convocation Center (506); DeKalb, IL
December 22, 2022*; 6:00 p.m., ESPN+		at Indiana State	W 67–57	4–9	32 – Williams	9 – Williams	3 – Thornton	Hulman Center (2,607); Terre Haute, IN
MAC regular season
January 3, 2023; 7:00 p.m., ESPN+		at Akron	L 51–76	4–10 (0–1)	11 – Nutter	9 – Nutter	1 – tied	James A. Rhodes Arena; Akron, OH
January 7, 2023; 11:00 a.m., ESPN+		at Buffalo	L 62–80	4–11 (0–2)	16 – Coit	7 – Ibarguen	5 – Thornton	Alumni Arena (2,030); Buffalo, NY
January 10, 2023; 7:00 p.m., ESPN+		Central Michigan	W 73–54	5–11 (1–2)	23 – Coit	7 – Crump	4 – Crump	Convocation Center (522); DeKalb, IL
January 14, 2023; 3:30 p.m., ESPN3		Toledo	L 67–84	5–12 (1–3)	22 – Hunter	5 – tied	7 – Thornton	Convocation Center (1,285); DeKalb, IL
January 17, 2023; 6:00 p.m., ESPN+		at Miami (OH)	W 81–77	6–12 (2–3)	21 – Coit	8 – Nutter	5 – Thornton	Millett Hall (979); Oxford, OH
January 21, 2023; TBA, ESPN3		at Eastern Michigan	W 88–67	7–12 (3–3)	24 – Coit	8 – Ibarguen	5 – Coit	George Gervin GameAbove Center (4,719); Ypsilanti, MI
January 24, 2023; 7:00 p.m., ESPN+		Kent State	W 86–76	8–12 (4–3)	32 – Coit	8 – Ibarguen	4 – Thornton	Convocation Center (837); DeKalb, IL
January 28, 2023; 3:30 p.m., ESPN		Ball State	L 69–87	8–13 (4–4)	20 – Coit	7 – Crump	5 – Thornton	Convocation Center (1,438); DeKalb, IL
January 31, 2023; 6:00 p.m., ESPN+		at Western Michigan	W 73–59	9–13 (5–4)	15 – Thornton	8 – Coit	5 – Thornton	University Arena (1,757); Kalamazoo, MI
February 4, 2023; 4:00 p.m., ESPN3		at Bowling Green	W 86–78	10–13 (6–4)	21 – Coit	7 – Ibarguen	9 – Thornton	Stroh Center (1,884); Bowling Green, OH
February 7, 2023; 7:00 p.m., ESPN+		Ohio	L 76–82	10–14 (6–5)	21 – Thornton	9 – Nutter	8 – Thornton	Convocation Center (902); DeKalb, IL
February 11, 2023; 3:00 p.m., ESPN3		Western Michigan	W 81–53	11–14 (7–5)	18 – Nutter	14 – Crump	11 – Thornton	Convocation Center (1,048); DeKalb, IL
February 14, 2023; 6:00 p.m., ESPN+		at Ball State	L 77–87	11–15 (7–6)	22 – Coit	8 – Crump	6 – Coit	Worthen Arena (3,635); Muncie, IN
February 18, 2023; 3:30 p.m., ESPN3		Miami (OH)	L 65–66	11–16 (7–7)	17 – Crump	11 – Crump	17 – Thornton	Convocation Center (1,690); DeKalb, IL
February 21, 2023; 6:00 p.m., ESPN+		at Ohio	L 68–77	11–17 (7–8)	17 – Hunter	10 – Crump	9 – Thornton	Convocation Center (4,799); Athens, OH
February 25, 2023; 2:00 p.m., ESPN3		at Central Michigan	W 84–80	12–17 (8–8)	21 – tied	7 – Nutter	5 – Thornton	McGuirk Arena (1,682); Mount Pleasant, MI
February 28, 2023; 7:00 p.m., ESPN+		Buffalo	L 75–85	12–18 (8–9)	18 – Hunter	6 – tied	9 – Thornton	Convocation Center (701); DeKalb, IL
March 3, 2023; 7:00 p.m., ESPN3		Eastern Michigan	W 85–66	13–18 (9–9)	19 – Thornton	7 – Ibarguen	11 – Thornton	Convocation Center (729); DeKalb, IL
MAC tournament
March 9, 2023; 4:00 p.m., ESPN+	(7)	vs. (2) Kent State; Quarterfinals	L 57–76	13–19	13 – Nutter	11 – Ibarguen	6 – Thornton	Rocket Mortgage FieldHouse (3,852); Cleveland, OH
*Non-conference game. ^{#}Rankings from AP poll. (#) Tournament seedings in parentheses. All times are in Central Time.
