= 2022–23 Central Michigan Chippewas men's basketball team =

American college basketball season

2022–23 Central Michigan Chippewas men's basketball
- Conference: Mid-American Conference
- Record: 10–21 (5–13 MAC)
- Head coach: Tony Barbee (2nd season)
- Assistant coaches: Shane Heirman (2nd season); Marlon Williamson (2nd season); Chris McMillian (2nd season)
- Home arena: McGuirk Arena

2022–23 Mid-American Conference men's basketball standings
	Conf.				Overall
Team	W		L	PCT	W		L	PCT
Toledo	16	–	2	.889	27	–	8	.771
Kent State †	15	–	3	.833	28	–	7	.800
Akron	13	–	5	.722	22	–	11	.667
Ball State	11	–	7	.611	20	–	12	.625
Ohio	10	–	8	.556	19	–	14	.576
Buffalo	9	–	9	.500	15	–	17	.469
Northern Illinois	9	–	9	.500	13	–	19	.406
Miami (OH)	6	–	12	.333	12	–	20	.375
Bowling Green	5	–	13	.278	11	–	20	.355
Eastern Michigan	5	–	13	.278	8	–	23	.258
Central Michigan	5	–	13	.278	10	–	21	.323
Western Michigan	4	–	14	.222	8	–	23	.258
† 2023 MAC tournament winner

The 2022–23 Central Michigan Chippewas men's basketball team represented Central Michigan University in the 2022–23 NCAA Division I men's basketball season. The Chippewas, led by second year head coach Tony Barbee, played their home games at McGuirk Arena in Mount Pleasant, Michigan as members of the Mid-American Conference. They finished 10–21 with a 5–13 MAC record. They finished tied for ninth in the MAC and failed to qualify for the MAC tournament.

== Previous season ==
The Chippewas finished the season 7–23, 6–12 in MAC play to finish in 8th place. They lost to Toledo in the first round of the MAC tournament.

== Offseason ==
=== Departures ===
Departures
Name	Pos.	Height	Weight	Year	Hometown	Notes
Cameron Healy	G	6'3	190	Grad	Sydney, Australia	Transferred to Southern Utah
Oscar Lopez Jr.	G	6'4	200	Junior	Cypress, California	Entered Transfer Portal
Aundre Polk	F	6'10	210	Sophomore	Detroit, Michigan	Transferred to Garden City Community College
Ryan Wade	G	6'2	185	Junior	Dallas, Texas	Transferred to Green Bay
Rastislav Sipkovsky	F	6'5	210	Sophomore	Šared, Slovakia	Entered Transfer Portal
Jermaine Jackson Jr.	G	6'0	175	Grad	Detroit, Michigan	Turned Professional
Harrison Henderson	F	6'11	240	Grad	Dallas, Texas	Exhausted Eligibility
Ralph Bissainthe	F	6'7	205	RS-Senior	North Miami, Florida	Turned Professional

=== Incoming transfers ===
Transfers
Name	Pos.	Height	Weight	Year	Hometown	Previous school
Jessie Zarzuela	G	6'3	180	Junior	Houston, Texas	Coppin State
Carrington McCaskill	F	6'8	210	Junior	Detroit, Michigan	Henry Ford College
Markus Harding	F	6'10	260	Sophomore	Toronto, Canada	Eastern Florida State College
Erwin Weary, Jr.	G	6'5	200	RS-Sophomore	Lynnwood, Washington	Western Washington

=== Recruiting class ===
College recruiting information
Name	Hometown	School	Height	Weight	Commit date
Reggie Bass; G	Muncie, Indiana	Arsenal Tech	6 ft 4 in (1.93 m)	185 lb (84 kg)	
Reggie Bass; G	Recruit ratings: Scout: Rivals: 247Sports: (80)				
Josiah Sanders; F	Phoenix, Arizona	Bella Vista Prep	6 ft 5 in (1.96 m)	235 lb (107 kg)	
Josiah Sanders; F	Recruit ratings: Scout: Rivals: 247Sports: (NR)				
Ola Ajiboye; F	Chicago, Illinois	Bosco Institute	6 ft 8 in (2.03 m)	225 lb (102 kg)	
Ola Ajiboye; F	Recruit ratings: Scout: Rivals: 247Sports: (NR)				
Caleb Atewe; F	Brampton, Ontario	Central Technical School	6 ft 9 in (2.06 m)	233 lb (106 kg)	
Caleb Atewe; F	Recruit ratings: Scout: Rivals: 247Sports: (NR)				
Emil Skytta; G	Helsinki, Finland	Phyk	6 ft 4 in (1.93 m)	190 lb (86 kg)	
Emil Skytta; G	Recruit ratings: Scout: Rivals: 247Sports: (NR)				
Max Majerle; G	Scottsdale, Arizona	Brewster Academy	6 ft 4 in (1.93 m)	185 lb (84 kg)	
Max Majerle; G	Recruit ratings: Scout: Rivals: 247Sports: (NR)				
Overall recruit ranking:
Note: In many cases, Scout, Rivals, 247Sports, On3, and ESPN may conflict in their listings of height and weight.; In these cases, the average was taken. ESPN grades are on a 100-point scale.; Sources: "2022 Team Ranking". Rivals.

== Roster ==
2022–23 Central Michigan Chippewas men's basketball team
Players
Coaches

Pos.	#	Name	Height	Weight	Year	Hometown
G	0	Brian Taylor	6 ft 6 in (1.98 m)	205 lb (93 kg)	Sr	Detroit, Michigan
G	1	Reggie Bass	6 ft 4 in (1.93 m)	185 lb (84 kg)	Fr	Muncie, Indiana
G	2	Boopie Miller	6 ft 0 in (1.83 m)	165 lb (75 kg)	So	Chicago, Illinois
G	3	Jessie Zarzuela	6 ft 3 in (1.91 m)	180 lb (82 kg)	Jr	Houston, Texas
F	4	Carrington McCaskill	6 ft 8 in (2.03 m)	210 lb (95 kg)	Jr	Detroit, Michigan
F	5	Josiah Sanders	6 ft 5 in (1.96 m)	235 lb (107 kg)	Fr	Phoenix, Arizona
G	10	Amani Drummond	6 ft 0 in (1.83 m)	170 lb (77 kg)	Fr	Houston, Texas
F	11	Ola Ajiboye	6 ft 8 in (2.03 m)	220 lb (100 kg)	Fr	Chicago, Illinois
C	12	Miroslav Stafl	6 ft 11 in (2.11 m)	235 lb (107 kg)	Sr	Liberec, Czech Republic
F	14	Caleb Atewe	6 ft 9 in (2.06 m)	233 lb (106 kg)	Fr	Brampton, Ontario
C	15	Marcus Harding	6 ft 10 in (2.08 m)	265 lb (120 kg)	So	Toronto, Ontario
C	22	Nicholas Pavrette	6 ft 11 in (2.11 m)	210 lb (95 kg)	So	Lyon, France
G	24	Emil Skytta	6 ft 4 in (1.93 m)	190 lb (86 kg)	Fr	Helsinki, Finland
F	34	Caleb Hodgson	6 ft 10 in (2.08 m)	235 lb (107 kg)	RS Jr	Dansville, Michigan
G	44	Max Majerle	6 ft 4 in (1.93 m)	185 lb (84 kg)	Fr	Scottsdale, Arizona

Head coach

- Tony Barbee (UMass)

Assistant coach(es)

- Shane Heirman (Tulsa)
- Marlon Williamson (Youngstown State)
- Chris McMillian (Wyoming)

Legend

- (C) Team captain
- (S) Suspended
- (I) Ineligible
- (W) Walk-on
- Injured
- Current redshirt

Roster
Last update: September 7, 2022

== Schedule and results ==
Date time, TV	Rank^{#}	Opponent^{#}	Result	Record	High points	High rebounds	High assists	Site (attendance) city, state
Exhibition
November 3, 2022*; 7:00 p.m.		Northwood	W 88–61	0–0	19 – Bass	11 – Harding	10 – Miller	McGuirk Arena; Mount Pleasant, MI
Non-conference regular season
November 10, 2022*; 8:00 p.m., FS2		at Marquette	L 73–97	0–1	17 – Zarzuela	10 – Pavrette	6 – Bass	Al McGuire Center (3,706); Milwaukee, WI
November 13, 2022*; 2:00 p.m., ESPN+		Eastern Illinois	W 76–60	1–1	23 – Miller	13 – Taylor	9 – Miller	McGuirk Arena (1,162); Mount Pleasant, MI
November 17, 2022*; 9:00 p.m., BTN		at Minnesota; SoCal Challenge campus game	L 60–68	1–2	19 – Miller	7 – Miller	3 – McCaskill	Williams Arena (8,096); Minneapolis, MN
November 21, 2022*; 5:30 p.m., FloSports		vs. High Point; SoCal Challenge	L 67–68	1–3	18 – Taylor	10 – Stafi	4 – Stafi	JSerra Pavilion (350); San Juan Capistrano, CA
November 23, 2022*; 3:00 p.m., FloSports		vs. Cal State Northridge; SoCal Challenge	W 82–66	2–3	21 – Zarzeula	12 – McCaskill	6 – Miller	JSerra Pavilion (250); San Juan Capistrano, CA
November 26, 2022*; 10:00 p.m., ESPN+		at California Baptist	L 61–77	2–4	20 – Taylor	8 – Taylor	6 – Zarzuela	CBU Events Center (2,067); Riverside, CA
November 29, 2022*; 7:00 p.m., ESPN+		Purdue Northwest	W 74–67	3–4	28 – Taylor	9 – Ajiboye	3 – Bass	McGuirk Arena (1,217); Mount Pleasant, MI
December 3, 2022*; 7:00 p.m., ESPN3		Alma	W 89–50	4–4	25 – Pavrette	11 – Ajiboye	6 – Bass	McGuirk Arena (1,480); Mount Pleasant, MI
December 7, 2022*; 7:00 p.m., ESPN+		Robert Morris	L 66–71	4–5	25 – Zarzuela	8 – Bass	2 – Tied	McGuirk Arena (1,269); Mount Pleasant, MI
December 10, 2022*; 3:00 p.m., ESPN+		at Tulsa	L 63–70	4–6	14 – Taylor	7 – McCaskill	5 – Bass	Reynolds Center; Tulsa, OK
December 18, 2022*; 8:00 p.m., ESPN+		at Missouri State	L 58–79	4–7	18 – Bass	4 – Tied	5 – Zarzuela	JQH Arena (2,020); Springfield, MO
December 21, 2022*; 7:00 p.m., ESPN+		Youngstown State	L 65–76	4–8	15 – Taylor	4 – Tied	7 – Zarzuela	McGuirk Arena (1,251); Mount Pleasant, MI
December 29, 2022*; 7:00 p.m., B1G+		at Michigan	W 63–61	5–8	19 – Zarzuela	9 – Harding	3 – Taylor	Crisler Center (12,707); Ann Arbor, MI
MAC regular season
January 3, 2023; 7:00 p.m., ESPN+		Miami (OH)	W 68–56	6–8 (1–0)	19 – Zarzuela	9 – Harding	2 – Bass	McGuirk Arena (1,091); Mount Pleasant, MI
January 7, 2023; 2:00 p.m., ESPN3		at Eastern Michigan	L 56–62	6–9 (1–1)	15 – Harding	10 – Taylor	5 – Bass	George Gervin GameAbove Center; Ypsilanti, MI
January 10, 2023; 8:00 p.m., ESPN+		at Northern Illinois	L 54–73	6–10 (1–2)	15 – Taylor	11 – Taylor	3 – Drummond	Convocation Center (522); DeKalb, IL
January 14, 2023; 4:30 p.m., ESPN3		Buffalo	W 87–78 ^{OT}	7–10 (2–2)	29 – Zarzuela	6 – Tied	6 – Bass	McGuirk Arena (1,756); Mount Pleasant, MI
January 17, 2023; 7:00 p.m., ESPN+		Akron	L 51–69	7–11 (2–3)	20 – Zarzuela	7 – Taylor	4 – Bass	McGuirk Arena (1,509); Mount Pleasant, MI
January 21, 2023; 2:00 p.m., ESPN3		at Ohio	L 68–96	7–12 (2–4)	27 – Taylor	11 – Taylor	4 – Bass	Convocation Center (5,904); Athens, OH
January 24, 2023; 7:00 p.m., ESPN+		Bowling Green	L 61–83	7–13 (2–5)	24 – Zarzuela	4 – Tied	3 – Zarzuela	McGuirk Arena (1,383); Mount Pleasant, MI
January 28, 2023; 7:00 p.m., ESPN3		Western Michigan	W 70–69	8–13 (3–5)	25 – Zarzuela	7 – Ajiboye	3 – Zarzuela	McGuirk Arena (5,425); Mount Pleasant, MI
January 31, 2023; 7:00 p.m., ESPN+		at Kent State	L 69–81	8–14 (3–6)	22 – Harding	5 – Bass	7 – Bass	MAC Center (2,235); Kent, OH
February 4, 2023; 7:00 p.m., ESPN3		at Toledo	L 59–84	8–15 (3–7)	20 – Taylor	8 – Pavrette	6 – Bass	Savage Arena (5,344); Toledo, OH
February 7, 2023; 7:00 p.m., ESPN+		Ball State	L 51–65	8–16 (3–18)	20 – Taylor	7 – Taylor	8 – Bass	McGuirk Arena (1,430); Mount Pleasant, MI
February 11, 2023; 3:30 p.m., ESPN3		at Miami	W 66–60	9–16 (4–8)	22 – Taylor	8 – Taylor	5 – Taylor	Millett Hall (5,066); Oxford, OH
February 14, 2023; 7:00 p.m., ESPN+		at Bowling Green	W 77–74	10–16 (5–8)	25 – Bass	6 – Tied	7 – Bass	Stroh Center (1,510); Bowling Green, OH
February 18, 2023; 2:00 p.m., ESPN3		Ohio	L 59–76	10–17 (5–9)	22 – Bass	9 – Pavrette	2 – Tied	McGuirk Arena (1,944); Mount Pleasant, MI
February 21, 2023; 7:00 p.m., ESPN+		at Buffalo	L 35–63	10–18 (5–10)	12 – Taylor	12 – Pavrette	2 – Tied	Alumni Arena (4,114); Buffalo, NY
February 25, 2023; 2:00 p.m., ESPN3		Northern Illinois	L 80–84	10–19 (5–11)	40 – Bass	9 – Harding	2 – Tied	McGuirk Arena (1,682); Mount Pleasant, MI
February 28, 2023; 7:00 p.m., ESPN+		Toledo	L 65–99	10–20 (5–12)	27 – Bass	6 – Ajiboye	4 – Bass	McGuirk Arena (1,565); Mount Pleasant, MI
March 3, 2023; 7:00 p.m., ESPN3		at Western Michigan	L 65–81	10–21 (5–13)	18 – Harding	6 – Taylor	6 – Taylor	University Arena (1,992); Kalamazoo, MI
*Non-conference game. ^{#}Rankings from AP Poll. (#) Tournament seedings in parentheses. All times are in Eastern Time.
