= 2023 MAC men's basketball tournament =

Basketball tournament

- Classification: Division I
- Season: 2022–23
- Teams: 8
- Site: Rocket Mortgage FieldHouse; Cleveland, Ohio
- Champions: Kent State (7th title)
- Winning coach: Rob Senderoff (2nd title)
- MVP: Sincere Carry (Kent State)
- Television: CBSSN, ESPN+, ESPN2
- MAC men's basketball tournaments

2022–23 Mid-American Conference men's basketball standings
	Conf.				Overall
Team	W		L	PCT	W		L	PCT
Toledo	16	–	2	.889	27	–	8	.771
Kent State †	15	–	3	.833	28	–	7	.800
Akron	13	–	5	.722	22	–	11	.667
Ball State	11	–	7	.611	20	–	12	.625
Ohio	10	–	8	.556	19	–	14	.576
Buffalo	9	–	9	.500	15	–	17	.469
Northern Illinois	9	–	9	.500	13	–	19	.406
Miami (OH)	6	–	12	.333	12	–	20	.375
Bowling Green	5	–	13	.278	11	–	20	.355
Eastern Michigan	5	–	13	.278	8	–	23	.258
Central Michigan	5	–	13	.278	10	–	21	.323
Western Michigan	4	–	14	.222	8	–	23	.258
† 2023 MAC tournament winner

The 2023 Mid-American Conference men's basketball tournament was the postseason men's basketball tournament for the Mid-American Conference (MAC) held March 9–11, 2023. The entire tournament was played at Rocket Mortgage FieldHouse in Cleveland, Ohio. Kent State defeated Toledo in the final to earn the conference's automatic bid to the 2023 NCAA tournament. Sincere Carry was the MVP.

== Format ==
As with the 2021, and 2022 tournament, only the top eight teams qualified. The winner of the tournament received the MAC's automatic bid to the 2023 NCAA tournament.

== Venue ==
The 2023 MAC tournament was held at Rocket Mortgage FieldHouse for the 24th consecutive season. The venue, located in downtown Cleveland at One Center Court, is the home of the Cleveland Cavaliers of the National Basketball Association (NBA) and has a seating capacity for basketball of 19,432.

== Seeds ==
Eight out of the 12 MAC teams qualified for the tournament. Teams were seeded by record within the conference, with a tiebreaker system to seed teams with identical conference records.

Seed	School	Conference record	Tiebreaker
1	Toledo	16–2	
2	Kent State	15–3	
3	Akron	13–5	
4	Ball State	11–7	
5	Ohio	10–8	
6	Buffalo	9–9	2–0 vs. Northern Illinois
7	Northern Illinois	9–9	0–2 vs. Buffalo
8	Miami	6–12	
DNQ	Bowling Green	5–13	3–1 vs Eastern Michigan & Central Michigan
DNQ	Eastern Michigan	5–13	1–2 vs Bowling Green & Central Michigan; 1–0 vs. Central Michigan
DNQ	Central Michigan	5–13	1–2 vs Bowling Green & Eastern Michigan; 0–1 vs. Eastern Michigan
DNQ	Western Michigan	4–14	

== Schedule ==
Session	Game	Time*	Matchup	Score	Attendance	Television
Quarterfinals – Thursday, March 9 – Rocket Mortgage FieldHouse, Cleveland, OH
1	1	11:00 am	No. 1 Toledo vs No. 8 Miami	91–75	3,852	ESPN+
1	2	1:30 p.m.	No. 4 Ball State vs No. 5 Ohio	70–90	3,852	ESPN+
1	3	4:00 p.m.	No. 2 Kent State vs No. 7 Northern Illinois	76–57	3,852	ESPN+
1	4	6:30 pm	No. 3 Akron vs No. 6 Buffalo	101–77	3,852	ESPN+
Semifinals – Friday, March 10 – Rocket Mortgage FieldHouse, Cleveland, OH
2	5	5:00 pm	No. 1 Toledo vs No. 5 Ohio	82–75	9,295	CBSSN
2	6	7:30 pm	No. 2 Kent State vs No. 3 Akron	79–73	9,295	CBSSN
Championship – Saturday, March 11 – Rocket Mortgage FieldHouse, Cleveland, OH
3	7	7:30 pm	No. 1 Toledo vs No. 2 Kent State	78–93	8,375	ESPN2
*Game times in ET. ()-Rankings denote tournament seeding.

== Bracket ==
Quarterfinals; Thursday, March 9, 2023
1	Toledo	91
8	Miami (OH)	75
4	Ball State	70
5	Ohio	90
2	Kent State	76
7	Northern Illinois	57
3	Akron	101
6	Buffalo	77

Semifinals; Friday, March 10, 2023
1	Toledo	82
5	Ohio	75
2	Kent State	79
3	Akron	73

Championship; Saturday, March 11, 2023
1	Toledo	78
2	Kent State	93

== All-Tournament Team ==
Tournament MVP – Sincere Carry

Player	Team
Sincere Carry	Kent State
Malique Jacobs	Kent State
RayJ Dennis	Toledo
Setric Millner Jr.	Toledo
Xavier Castaneda	Akron

== See also ==
- 2023 MAC women's basketball tournament
