= 2022–23 Western Michigan Broncos men's basketball team =

American college basketball season

2022–23 Western Michigan Broncos men's basketball
- Conference: Mid-American Conference
- Record: 8–23 (4–14 MAC)
- Head coach: Dwayne Stephens (1st season)
- Assistant coaches: Jeff Rutter; Chris Fowler; Manny Dosanjh
- Home arena: University Arena

2022–23 Mid-American Conference men's basketball standings
| | Conf. | | | | Overall |
| Team | W | | L | PCT | W | | L | PCT |
|---|---|---|---|---|---|---|---|---|
| Toledo | 16 | – | 2 | .889 | 27 | – | 8 | .771 |
| Kent State † | 15 | – | 3 | .833 | 28 | – | 7 | .800 |
| Akron | 13 | – | 5 | .722 | 22 | – | 11 | .667 |
| Ball State | 11 | – | 7 | .611 | 20 | – | 12 | .625 |
| Ohio | 10 | – | 8 | .556 | 19 | – | 14 | .576 |
| Buffalo | 9 | – | 9 | .500 | 15 | – | 17 | .469 |
| Northern Illinois | 9 | – | 9 | .500 | 13 | – | 19 | .406 |
| Miami (OH) | 6 | – | 12 | .333 | 12 | – | 20 | .375 |
| Bowling Green | 5 | – | 13 | .278 | 11 | – | 20 | .355 |
| Eastern Michigan | 5 | – | 13 | .278 | 8 | – | 23 | .258 |
| Central Michigan | 5 | – | 13 | .278 | 10 | – | 21 | .323 |
| Western Michigan | 4 | – | 14 | .222 | 8 | – | 23 | .258 |
† 2023 MAC tournament winner

The 2022–23 Western Michigan Broncos men's basketball team represented Western Michigan University in the 2022–23 NCAA Division I men's basketball season. The Broncos, led by first-year head coach Dwayne Stephens, played their home games at University Arena in Kalamazoo, Michigan as members of the Mid-American Conference. They finished 8–23 with a 4–14 MAC record. They finished last in the MAC and failed to qualify for the MAC tournament.

== Previous season ==
The Broncos finished the season 8–23, 4–16 in MAC play to finish in last place. They failed to qualify for the MAC tournament.

On March 7, 2022, head coach Clayton Bates resigned after only two seasons. On April 5, the school named longtime Michigan State assistant Dwayne Stephens the team's new head coach.

== Offseason ==
=== Departures ===
Departures
| Name | Number | Pos. | Height | Weight | Year | Hometown | Reason |
|---|---|---|---|---|---|---|---|
| Josiah Freeman | 12 | G | 6'3" | 205 | Freshman | Manassas Park, Virginia | Transferred to Howard College |
| Cameron Kimble | 14 | G | 6'5" | 180 | Freshman | Las Vegas, Nevada | Transferred to New Mexico Junior College |
| Mileek McMillan | 1 | F | 6'9" | 225 | Senior | Merrillville, Indiana | Exhausted Eligibility |
| Mack Smith | 32 | G | 6'2" | 210 | Senior | Indianapolis, Indiana | Exhausted Eligibility |

=== Incoming transfers ===
Incoming transfers
| Name | Number | Pos. | Height | Weight | Year | Hometown | Previous School |
|---|---|---|---|---|---|---|---|
| Tray Maddox | 2 | G | 5'10" | 155 | Senior | Novi, Michigan | Cal State Fullerton |
| Tafari Simms | 23 | F | 6'6" | 212 | Senior | Hamilton, Ontario | Milwaukee |

=== Recruiting class ===
College recruiting information
| Name | Hometown | School | Height | Weight | Commit date |
|---|---|---|---|---|---|
| Max Burton; C | Williamston, Michigan | Williamston | 6 ft 9 in (2.06 m) | 230 lb (100 kg) | Jan 10, 2022 |
| Max Burton; C | Recruit ratings: Scout: Rivals: 247Sports: (NR) | | | | |
| Javaughn Hannah; SG | Williamston, Michigan | Orchard Lake St. Mary’s | 6 ft 4 in (1.93 m) | 205 lb (93 kg) | Aug 26, 2021 |
| Javaughn Hannah; SG | Recruit ratings: Scout: Rivals: 247Sports: (79) | | | | |
| Seth Hubbard; CG | Jonesboro, Georgia | Huntington Prep | 6 ft 2 in (1.88 m) | 160 lb (73 kg) | |
| Seth Hubbard; CG | Recruit ratings: 247Sports: | | | | |
| Jefferson Monegro; CG | LaSalle, Quebec | Orangeville Prep | 6 ft 4 in (1.93 m) | 185 lb (84 kg) | |
| Jefferson Monegro; CG | Recruit ratings: Rivals: | | | | |
| Jack Stefanski; F | Frankfort, Michigan | Frankfort High School | 6 ft 6 in (1.98 m) | 205 lb (93 kg) | |
| Jack Stefanski; F | Recruit ratings: No ratings found | | | | |
| Elisha Warren; G | Woodhaven, Michigan | Woodhaven | 6 ft 2 in (1.88 m) | 175 lb (79 kg) | |
| Elisha Warren; G | Recruit ratings: No ratings found | | | | |
Overall recruit ranking:
Note: In many cases, Scout, Rivals, 247Sports, On3, and ESPN may conflict in their listings of height and weight.; In these cases, the average was taken. ESPN grades are on a 100-point scale.; Sources: "2022 Team Ranking". Rivals.

== Roster ==
2022–23 Western Michigan Broncos men's basketball team
Players
Coaches

| Pos. | # | Name | Height | Weight | Year | Previous school | Hometown |
|---|---|---|---|---|---|---|---|
| F | 0 | Markeese Hastings | 6 ft 7 in (2.01 m) | 195 lb (88 kg) | RS Jr | Butler University | Grand Rapids, Michigan |
| F | 1 | Shemani Fuller | 6 ft 8 in (2.03 m) | 205 lb (93 kg) | RS Fr | Cardinal Hayes | The Bronx, New York |
| G | 2 | Tray Maddox Jr. | 6 ft 4 in (1.93 m) | 200 lb (91 kg) | RS Sr | Cal State Fullerton | Novi, Michigan |
| G | 3 | B. Artis White | 5 ft 10 in (1.78 m) | 155 lb (70 kg) | Jr | Canton High School | Canton, Michigan |
| G | 4 | Javaughn Hannah | 6 ft 4 in (1.93 m) | 205 lb (93 kg) | Fr | Orchard Lake St. Mary’s | Mount Clemens, Michigan |
| G | 5 | Jefferson Monegro | 6 ft 4 in (1.93 m) | 185 lb (84 kg) | Fr | Orangeville Prep | LaSalle, Quebec |
| F | 10 | Max Burton | 6 ft 9 in (2.06 m) | 230 lb (104 kg) | Fr | Williamston | Williamston, Michigan |
| G | 11 | Lamar Norman Jr. | 6 ft 1 in (1.85 m) | 175 lb (79 kg) | Sr | Duquesne University | Grand Rapids, Michigan |
| G | 12 | Seth Hubbard | 6 ft 4 in (1.93 m) | 175 lb (79 kg) | Fr | Huntington Prep | Jonesboro, Georgia |
| F | 20 | Owen Lobsinger | 6 ft 9 in (2.06 m) | 225 lb (102 kg) | So | Powers Catholic High School | Flint, Michigan |
| F | 21 | Gus Etchison | 5 ft 11 in (1.8 m) | 145 lb (66 kg) | So | Hamilton Heights High School | Arcadia, Indiana |
| C | 22 | Titus Wright | 6 ft 8 in (2.03 m) | 220 lb (100 kg) | Jr | Thomasville High School | Thomasville, Georgia |
| F | 23 | Tafari Simms | 6 ft 6 in (1.98 m) | 212 lb (96 kg) | Sr | Milwaukee | Hamilton, Ontario |
| G | 24 | Elisha Warren | 6 ft 2 in (1.88 m) | 175 lb (79 kg) | Fr | Woodhaven | Woodhaven, Michigan |
| F | 33 | Jack Stefanski | 6 ft 6 in (1.98 m) | 205 lb (93 kg) | Fr | Frankfort High School | Frankfort, Michigan |

Head coach

- Dwayne Stephens (Michigan State)

Assistant coach(es)

- Jeff Rutter (Winona State)
- Chris Fowler (Central Michigan)
- Manny Dosanjh (Oral Roberts)

Legend

- (C) Team captain
- (S) Suspended
- (I) Ineligible
- (W) Walk-on
- Injured
- Current redshirt

Roster
Last update: September 7, 2022

== Schedule and results ==
| Date time, TV | Rank^{#} | Opponent^{#} | Result | Record | High points | High rebounds | High assists | Site (attendance) city, state |
Exhibition
| November 2, 2022*; 7:00 p.m. | | Kalamazoo | W 82–59 | – | – | – | – | University Arena; Kalamazoo, MI |
Non-conference regular season
| November 7, 2022*; 9:00 p.m., BTN+ | | at Minnesota | L 60–61 | 0–1 | 15 – Norman | 10 – Hastings | 4 – Norman | Williams Arena (8,119); Minneapolis, MN |
| November 10, 2022*; 7:00 p.m., ESPN+ | | Goshen | W 99–62 | 1–1 | 13 – Wright | 10 – Hastings | 5 – Etchison | University Arena (1,444); Kalamazoo, MI |
| November 13, 2022*; 5:00 p.m., ESPN+ | | at Valparaiso | L 65–81 | 1–2 | 25 – Norman | 12 – Wright | 3 – Norman | Athletics–Recreation Center (1,680); Valparaiso, IN |
| November 18, 2022*; 8:00 p.m., ESPN+ | | vs. Houston Christian; Owl Invitational | W 90–84 | 2–2 | 34 – Norman | 8 – Hannah | 4 – Norman | Tudor Fieldhouse (502); Houston, TX |
| November 19, 2022*; 6:00 p.m., CUSATV | | at Rice; Owl Invitational | L 88–96 | 2–3 | 30 – Norman | 11 – Hastings | 3 – Tied | Tudor Fieldhouse (1,141); Houston, TX |
| November 20, 2022*; 1:00 p.m. | | vs. Georgia Southern; Owl Invitational | L 57–63 | 2–4 | 23 – Norman | 12 – Hastings | 6 – Monegro | Tudor Fieldhouse (1,267); Houston, TX |
| November 26, 2022*; 12:00 p.m., ESPN3 | | Cleveland State | L 49–71 | 2–5 | 13 – Norman | 6 – Wright | 3 – Norman | University Arena (1,422); Kalamazoo, MI |
| November 30, 2022*; 7:00 p.m., ESPN+ | | at Dayton | L 47–67 | 2–6 | 10 – Norman | 6 – Maddux | 2 – Tied | UD Arena (13,407); Dayton, OH |
| December 5, 2022*; 7:00 p.m. | | Concordia | W 94–50 | 3–6 | 22 – Tied | 17 – Hastings | 6 – Tied | University Arena (1,286); Kalamazoo, MI |
| December 10, 2022*; 2:30 p.m., ESPN3 | | UIC | L 56–62 | 3–7 | 24 – Simms | 14 – Hastings | 4 – Monegro | University Arena (1,682); Kalamazoo, MI |
| December 18, 2022*; 1:00 p.m., BIG12/ESPN+ | | at Iowa State | L 57–73 | 3–8 | 24 – Norman | 8 – Hastings | 3 – Wright | Hilton Coliseum (11,992); Ames, IA |
| December 21, 2022*; 1:00 p.m., ESPN+ | | Siena Heights | W 61–41 | 4–8 | 12 – Lobsinger | 18 – Hastings | 3 – Etchison | University Arena (1,035); Kalamazoo, MI |
| December 30, 2022*; 8:00 p.m., BTN+ | | at No. 15 Wisconsin | L 66–76 | 4–9 | 16 – Maddux | 8 – Hastings | 4 – Hastings | Kohl Center (15,138); Madison, WI |
MAC regular season
| January 3, 2023; 7:00 pm, ESPN+ | | at Kent State | L 72–80 | 4–10 (0–1) | 18 – Maddux | 11 – Hastings | 5 – Maddux | MAC Center (2,113); Kent, OH |
| January 6, 2023; 6:30 pm, CBSSN | | at Toledo | L 74–102 | 4–11 (0–2) | 18 – Wright | 20 – Hastings | 4 – Maddox | Savage Arena (4,237); Toledo, OH |
| January 10, 2023; 7:00 p.m., ESPN+ | | Eastern Michigan | W 85–79 | 5–11 (1–2) | 25 – Norman | 14 – Hastings | 3 – Tied | University Arena (3,017); Kalamazoo, MI |
| January 14, 2023; 1:00 p.m., ESPN+ | | Bowling Green | W 108–92 | 6–11 (2–2) | 24 – Hannah | 7 – Wright | 8 – Norman | University Arena (1,940); Kalamazoo, MI |
| January 17, 2023; 7:00 pm, ESPN+ | | at Ball State | L 70–71 | 6–12 (2–3) | 31 – Norman | 11 – Wright | 4 – Norman | Worthen Arena (3,799); Muncie, IN |
| January 21, 2023; 2:30 p.m., ESPN3 | | Akron | W 63–55 | 6–13 (2–4) | 18 – Hastings | 10 – Hastings | 6 – Norman | University Arena (2,288); Kalamazoo, MI |
| January 24, 2023; 7:00 p.m., ESPN+ | | at Ohio | L 76–88 | 6–14 (2–5) | 20 – Norman | 7 – Hastings | 4 – Maddox | Convocation Center (4,703); Athens, OH |
| January 28, 2023; 7:00 p.m., ESPN3 | | at Central Michigan | L 69–70 | 6–15 (2–6) | 27 – Norman | 10 – Hastings | 3 – Tied | McGuirk Arena (5,425); Mount Pleasant, MI |
| January 31, 2023; 7:00 p.m., ESPN+ | | Northern Illinois | L 59–73 | 6–16 (2–7) | 22 – Hastings | 19 – Hastings | 3 – Norman | University Arena (1,757); Kalamazoo, MI |
| February 4, 2023; 2:30 p.m., ESPN3 | | Buffalo | L 76–85 | 6–17 (2–8) | 21 – Maddox | 6 – Maddox | 5 – Tied | University Arena (2,007); Kalamazoo, MI |
| February 7, 2023; 7:00 p.m., ESPN+ | | at Miami | L 78–85 | 6–18 (2–9) | 20 – Hubbard | 12 – Hastings | 3 – Tied | Millett Hall (1,304); Oxford, OH |
| February 11, 2023; 4:00 p.m., ESPN3 | | at Northern Illinois | L 53–81 | 6–19 (2–10) | 18 – Norman | 14 – Fuller | 11 – Norman | Convocation Center (1,048); DeKalb, IL |
| February 14, 2023; 7:00 p.m., ESPN+ | | Kent State | L 58–82 | 6–20 (2–11) | 17 – Norman | 6 – Wright | 3 – Tied | University Arena (1,381); Kalamazoo, MI |
| February 18, 2023; 2:30 p.m., ESPN3 | | Ball State | W 78–68 | 7–20 (3–11) | 22 – Maddox | 10 – Hastings | 3 – Hastings | University Arena (2,196); Kalamazoo, MI |
| February 21, 2023; 7:00 p.m., ESPN+ | | at Eastern Michigan | L 59–66 | 7–21 (3–12) | 18 – Norman | 7 – Tied | 2 – Tied | George Gervin GameAbove Center (2,703); Ypsilanti, MI |
| February 25, 2023; 4:00 p.m., ESPN3 | | at Akron | L 64–81 | 7–22 (3–13) | 19 – Hubbard | 6 – Maddox | 5 – Norman | James A. Rhodes Arena (1,739); Akron, OH |
| February 28, 2023; 7:00 p.m., ESPN+ | | Miami | L 66–72 | 7–23 (3–14) | 25 – Maddox | 8 – Wright | 4 – Norman | University Arena (1,398); Kalamazoo, MI |
| March 3, 2023; 7:00 p.m., ESPN3 | | Central Michigan | W 81–65 | 8–23 (4–14) | 22 – Maddox Jr. | 15 – Hastings | 6 – Norman Jr. | University Arena (1,992); Kalamazoo, MI |
*Non-conference game. ^{#}Rankings from AP Poll. (#) Tournament seedings in parentheses. All times are in Eastern Time.
