= Travis Steele =

American basketball coach (born 1981)

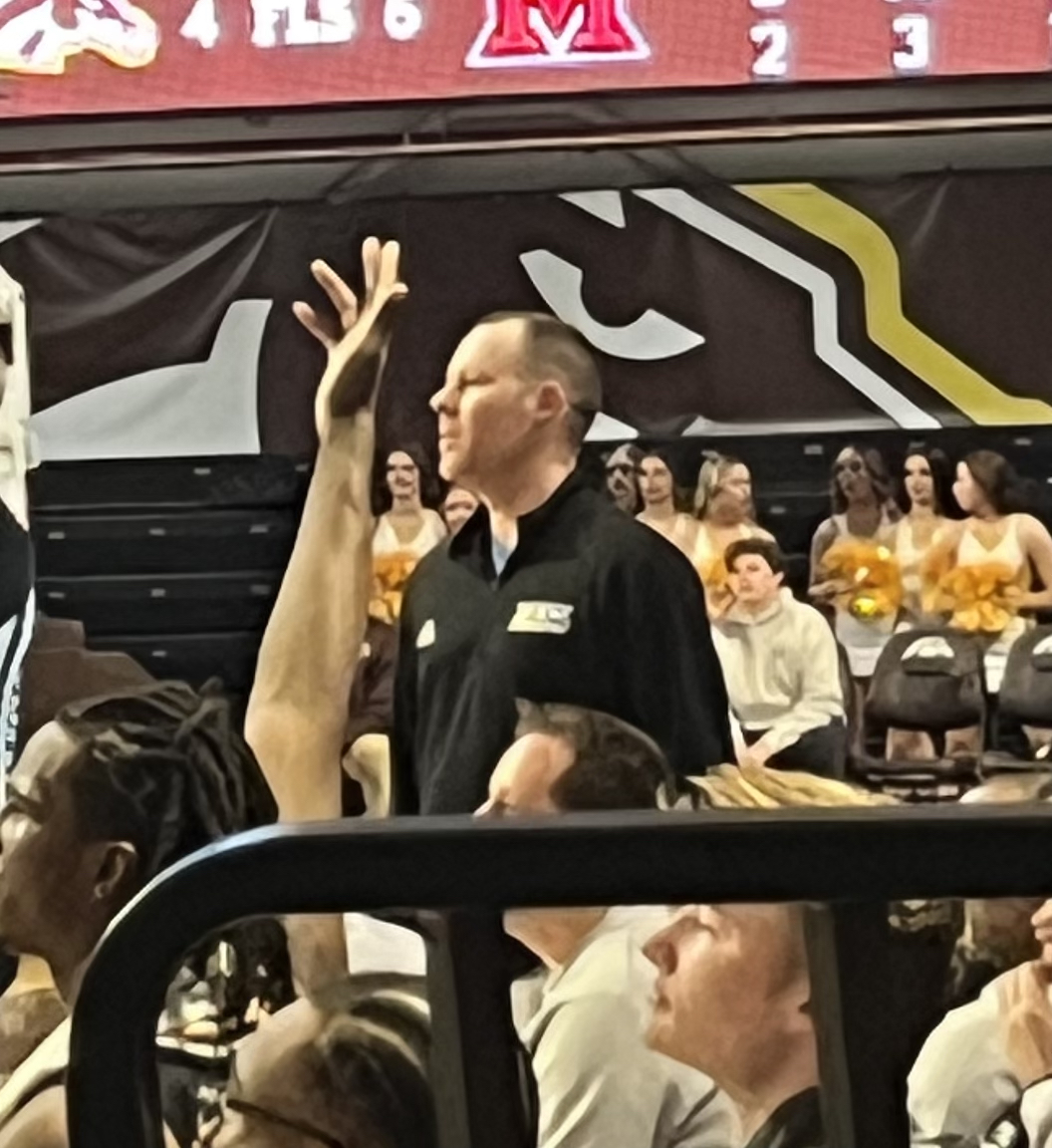
- Steele in 2026

Current position
- Title: Head coach
- Team: Miami (OH)
- Conference: MAC
- Record: 87–48 (.644)

Biographical details
- Born: November 12, 1981 (age 45); Danville, Indiana, U.S.
- Education: Butler ('04)

Coaching career (HC unless noted)
- 2001–2004: Ben Davis HS (assistant)
- 2004–2005: Ohio State (GA)
- 2005–2006: Wabash Valley (assistant)
- 2006–2008: Indiana (assistant)
- 2009–2015: Xavier (assistant)
- 2015–2018: Xavier (associate HC)
- 2018–2022: Xavier
- 2022–present: Miami (OH)

Administrative career (AD unless noted)
- 2008–2009: Xavier (DBO)

Head coaching record
- Overall: 157–98 (.616)
- Tournaments: 1–1 (NCAA Division I); 2–1 (NIT)

Accomplishments and honors

Championships
- MAC regular season (2026)

Awards
- MAC Coach of the Year (2026)

Travis Andrew Steele (born November 12, 1981) is an American college basketball coach, and current head men's basketball coach at Miami University. He previously served as the head coach at Xavier.

== Coaching career ==
Steele began coaching as an undergraduate at Butler University, assisting the varsity boys basketball team at nearby Ben Davis HS from 2001 to 2004. He served one season as a graduate manager at Ohio State before landing his first college coaching position as an assistant coach at Wabash Valley in 2005. Steele moved on to Indiana, where he started as the team's video coordinator in 2006, and was elevated to an assistant coach for the remainder of the 2008 season after Kelvin Sampson's contract was terminated by the Hoosiers as a result of NCAA recruiting violations.

After Indiana, Steele was hired by Sean Miller at Xavier for the 2008–09 season. Steele was retained by Chris Mack after Miller accepted the Arizona head coaching position. Steele was part of a Musketeers program that went to eight NCAA tournaments, including an Elite Eight run in 2017, as well as being part of two Atlantic 10 regular season titles and one Big East regular season title.

=== Xavier ===
On March 31, 2018, Steele was promoted to become the 18th head coach in Xavier history, replacing Mack who departed for Louisville. Steele led the Musketeers to the 2019 NIT in his first season on the job, and another appearance in the tournament in 2022. On March 16, 2022, the day after Xavier's first-round NIT win over Cleveland State, Steele was fired from Xavier. His record in four years was 70–50.

=== Miami (OH) ===
On March 31, 2022, Steele was hired as head coach at Miami, becoming the 28th head coach in school history. When the 2025–26 Miami RedHawks started the season 25–0, in recognition of the Miami Redhawks swim team that had shown up in the winter to support the basketball team in just their Speedo trunks, Steele committed on College GameDay to Rece Davis to be hoisted while in a swimming motion wearing only a Speedo on Selection Sunday if the team won its final 6 games and the 2026 MAC men's basketball tournament. Ultimately they would finish the regular season undefeated, but lose their first game of the season in the first round of their conference tournament to Massachusetts.

In the NCAA Basketball Tournament (First Four), Miami defeated SMU 89–79, but lost their next game to Tennessee 78–56.

== Head coaching record ==
Record table
Season	Team	Overall	Conference	Standing	Postseason
Xavier Musketeers (Big East Conference) (2018–2022)
2018–19	Xavier	19–16	9–9	T–3rd	NIT Second Round
2019–20	Xavier	19–13	8–10	T–6th	
2020–21	Xavier	13–8	6–7	7th	
2021–22	Xavier	19–13	8–11	8th	NIT Second Round*
Xavier:		70–50 (.583)	31–37 (.456)		
Miami RedHawks (Mid-American Conference) (2022–present)
2022–23	Miami (OH)	12–20	6–12	8th	
2023–24	Miami (OH)	15–17	9–9	T–6th	
2024–25	Miami (OH)	25–9	14–4	2nd	
2025–26	Miami (OH)	32–2	18–0	1st	NCAA Division I Round of 64
2026–27	Miami (OH)	3–0	0–0		
Miami:		87–48 (.644)	47–25 (.653)		
Total:		157–98 (.616)			
National champion Postseason invitational champion Conference regular season champion Conference regular season and conference tournament champion Division regular season champion Division regular season and conference tournament champion Conference tournament champion

* ^^{a} Steele was fired after the NIT First Round win over Cleveland State.

== Personal life ==
Steele's brother is John Groce, the current head coach of Charleston.
