= Dwayne Stephens =

American basketball coach (born 1971)

Biographical details
- Born: July 19, 1971 (age 55); Ferndale, Michigan

Playing career
- 1989–1993: Michigan State

Coaching career (HC unless noted)
- 1997–1999: Oakland (assistant)
- 1999–2003: Marquette (assistant)
- 2003–2022: Michigan State (assistant)
- 2022–2026: Western Michigan
- 2026-Present: Penn State (assistant)

Head coaching record
- Overall: 42–84 (.333)

Dwayne Jerome Stephens (born July 19, 1971) is an American basketball coach who was most recently the men's head coach for the Western Michigan Broncos. Previously, he was an assistant and associate head coach at Michigan State for 19 years.

== Playing career ==
Stephens played basketball at Michigan State from 1989 to 1993 under Spartan legend Jud Heathcote. He was a four-year letter winner for the Spartans and was a third-team Basketball Weekly's Freshman All-America Team. In his junior year, he averaged 11.2 points and five rebounds. In his senior season, he was co-captain for the Spartans and averaged 9.1 points and 5.6 rebounds per game. He was named to Basketball Weekly's Honorable Mention All-Midwest Team. He played three professional seasons in Europe.

== Coaching career ==
Stephens began his coaching career as an assistant for two season at Oakland from 1997 to 1999. He then joined former Tom Izzo assistant Tom Crean at Marquette and went to the Final Four in 2003 with Marquette star Dwyane Wade. Stephens then joined his alma mater, Michigan State and its Hall of Fame head coach Tom Izzo, as an assistant in 2003. He was named associate head coach in 2012.

On April 4, 2022, Stephens, who had been considered for the position in 2020, accepted the head coaching position at Western Michigan.

Following the end of the 2026 season, Stephens was fired from the head coach position at WMU. He was 42–84 overall in four seasons.

== Head coaching record ==
Record table
Season	Team	Overall	Conference	Standing	Postseason
Western Michigan (MAC) (2022–2026)
2022–23	Western Michigan	8–23	4–14	12th	
2023–24	Western Michigan	12–20	9–9	T–6th	
2024–25	Western Michigan	12–20	9–9	T–6th	
2025–26	Western Michigan	10–21	4–14	T–11th	
Western Michigan:		42–84 (.333)	26–46 (.361)		
Total:		42–84 (.333)			
National champion Postseason invitational champion Conference regular season champion Conference regular season and conference tournament champion Division regular season champion Division regular season and conference tournament champion Conference tournament champion
