= Rob Senderoff =

American basketball coach (born 1973)

Current position
- Title: Head coach
- Team: Kent State
- Conference: MAC
- Record: 313–189 (.624)

Biographical details
- Born: July 25, 1973 (age 53); Spring Valley, New York, U.S.
- Education: SUNY Albany ('95); Miami (OH) ('97)

Coaching career (HC unless noted)
- 1995–1997: Miami (OH) (GA)
- 1997–1999: Fordham (assistant)
- 1999–2001: Yale (assistant)
- 2001–2002: Towson (assistant)
- 2002–2006: Kent State (assistant)
- 2006–2008: Indiana (assistant)
- 2008–2011: Kent State (associate HC)
- 2011–present: Kent State

Head coaching record
- Overall: 313–189 (.624)
- Tournaments: 0–2 (NCAA Division I); 2–2 (NIT); 3–4 (CIT); 0–1 (TBC)

Accomplishments and honors

Championships
- 2 MAC tournament (2017, 2023); MAC regular season (2015); MAC East division (2015)

Awards
- MAC Coach of the Year (2022)

Robert Andrew Senderoff (born July 25, 1973) is the head men's basketball coach at Kent State University. The winningest and longest-tenured coach in program history, he has led the Flashes to a Mid-American Conference regular season title as well as NCAA Tournament appearances in 2017 and 2023.

== Personal and early life ==
Senderoff is a native of Spring Valley, New York. He played basketball for his high school team. He earned a bachelor's degree in business administration from University at Albany in 1995, and was also a student assistant with the basketball program.

He then moved on to Miami University, where he was a graduate assistant and earned a master's degree in sports studies in 1997. He is married to Lauren (née Edelstein), with two children, Ray and Samantha. He is Jewish, and is a member of Temple Beth Shalom in Hudson, Ohio, and lives in Stow, Ohio.

== Coaching career ==
Senderoff served as an assistant coach at Fordham University (1997–99), Yale University (1999–2001), and Towson University (2001–02), and as a graduate assistant at Miami University.

Senderoff had two stints with the Kent State program before moving into the head job. First, he was an assistant to coach Jim Christian from 2002–06. Then, he was hired by former head coach Geno Ford to be his associate head coach.

Senderoff was then hired by Kelvin Sampson to be an assistant for two seasons at Indiana. Sampson and Senderoff resigned in October 2007 in the midst of a recruiting controversy. The NCAA eventually handed Senderoff a 30-month show-cause penalty for his role in the scandal. Unlike the vast majority of coaches given such a penalty, he retained a coaching job during it.

He was hired by Kent State as an assistant coach in April 2008. In September 2010, The Hoop Scoop rated him as the fourth-best Mid-Major assistant basketball coach in the nation.

He was hired as the 24th head coach in the 95-year history of Kent State basketball on April 7, 2011, to replace Geno Ford, under whom Senderoff had served as associate head coach for the previous three seasons. His contract called for three years at $250,000 per year, with built-in bonuses for meeting incentives. In May 2015, Kent State extended his contract by five years, with compensation of an estimated $350,000 per year.

Senderoff led the Golden Flashes to their first MAC Tournament Championship and NCAA Tournament appearance in eight years in 2017, but lost to UCLA in the first round. Following their NCAA Tournament appearance, Kent State would extend Senderoff's contract an additional two years.

On Dec. 28, 2018, Senderoff won his 149th career game, passing Jim McDonald for the most in Kent State history. The Flashes made their fourth CIT appearance under Senderoff later that season before going 15–8 two years later, their second-best season winning percentage (.652) of Senderoff's tenure. New athletic director Randale L. Richmond subsequently rewarded the coach with another extension through 2026.

During the 2021–22 season, Senderoff led the team to a 12-game winning streak to conclude the regular season, the longest winning streak at Kent State since the 2002 season. He was named MAC Coach of the Year for the first time in March 2022, the ninth time a KSU head coach had won the award. Despite posting the best record of his career at the time at 23–11, KSU lost to Akron in the MAC Tournament finals before falling to Northern Arizona in the first round of the inaugural edition of The Basketball Classic.

In the 2022-2023 season, Senderoff led the Golden Flashes to even more success, finishing 28-7, 15-3 in conference play. It is the best record of Senderoff's career and the best record by Kent State since 2007-2008 when they also went 28-7 overall. In the MAC Tournament, the Flashes would go on to defeat 7th seeded Northern Illinois and arch-rival 4th seeded Akron to reach the MAC Tournament Championship against #1 seeded Toledo. Despite being underdogs and Toledo riding a 17-game winning streak, the Flashes would defeat Toledo to win the MAC Tournament. It was the second time in Senderoff's career his Flashes won the Tournament and their second appearance in the NCAA Tournament during his tenure. The Flashes would go on to lose in the first round of the NCAA Tournament to Indiana.

Following the 2024-2025 season, where Senderoff led Kent State to the NIT Quarterfinals, reports surfaced that Senderoff was going to take the head coaching job at Fordham University, where he had previously served as an assistant coach. However, Senderoff ultimately decided to return to Kent State on a new six-year contract that would keep at Kent State through the 2030-2031 season.

== Head coaching record ==
Record table
Season	Team	Overall	Conference	Standing	Postseason
Kent State Golden Flashes (Mid-American Conference) (2011–present)
2011–12	Kent State	21–12	10–6	4th (East)	CIT first round
2012–13	Kent State	21–14	9–7	3rd (East)	CIT second round
2013–14	Kent State	16–16	7–11	5th (East)	
2014–15	Kent State	23–12	12–6	T–1st (East)	CIT quarterfinals
2015–16	Kent State	19–13	10–8	T–3rd (East)	
2016–17	Kent State	22–14	10–8	4th (East)	NCAA Division I Round of 64
2017–18	Kent State	17–17	9–9	2nd (East)	
2018–19	Kent State	22–11	11–7	3rd (East)	CIT first round
2019–20	Kent State	20–12	9–9	4th (East)	No postseason held
2020–21	Kent State	15–8	12–6	T–3rd	
2021–22	Kent State	23–11	16–4	2nd	TBC first round
2022–23	Kent State	28–7	15–3	2nd	NCAA Division I Round of 64
2023–24	Kent State	17–17	8–10	8th	
2024–25	Kent State	24–12	11–7	3rd	NIT quarterfinals
2025–26	Kent State	24–10	14–4	3rd	NIT first round
2026–27	Kent State	1–3	0–0		
Kent State:		313–189 (.624)	163–105 (.608)		
Total:		313–189 (.624)			
National champion Postseason invitational champion Conference regular season champion Conference regular season and conference tournament champion Division regular season champion Division regular season and conference tournament champion Conference tournament champion
