= Kobe Bufkin =

American basketball player (born 2003)

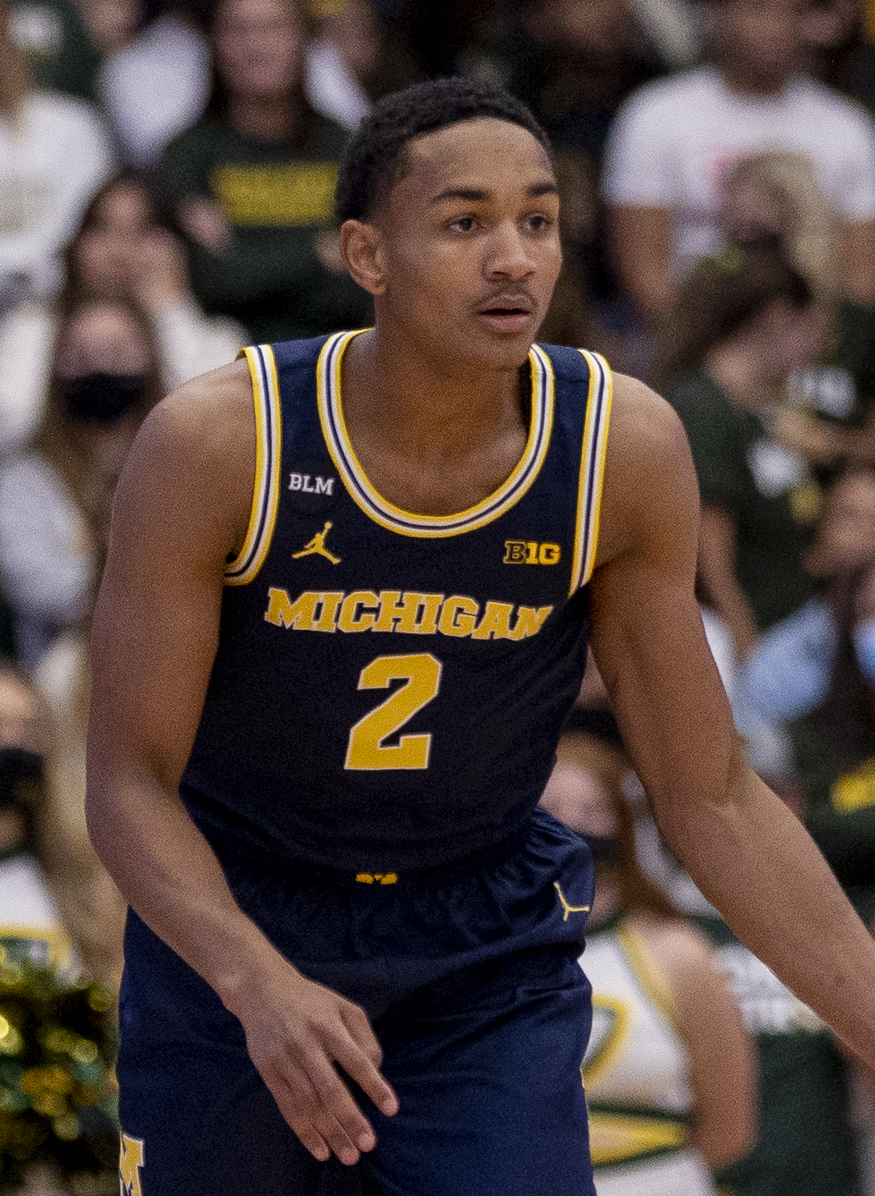
- Bufkin with the Michigan Wolverines in 2021

No. 0 – Utah Jazz
- Position: Shooting guard / point guard
- League: NBA

Personal information
- Born: September 21, 2003 (age 23) Grand Rapids, Michigan, U.S.
- Listed height: 6 ft 5 in (1.96 m)
- Listed weight: 195 lb (88 kg)

Career information
- High school: Grand Rapids Christian (Grand Rapids, Michigan)
- College: Michigan (2021–2023)
- NBA draft: 2023: 1st round, 15th overall pick
- Drafted by: Atlanta Hawks
- Playing career: 2023–present

Career history
- 2023–2025: Atlanta Hawks
- 2023–2024: →College Park Skyhawks
- 2025–2026: South Bay Lakers
- 2026: Los Angeles Lakers
- 2026–present: Utah Jazz
- 2026–present: →Salt Lake City Stars

Career highlights
- All-NBA G League Second Team (2026); Third-team All-Big Ten (2023); McDonald's All-American (2021)
- Stats at NBA.com
- Stats at Basketball Reference

Kobe Bufkin (/ˈkoʊbi ˈbʌfkɪn/ KOH-bee, BUF-kin; born September 21, 2003) is an American professional basketball player for the Utah Jazz of the National Basketball Association (NBA), on a two-way contract with the Salt Lake City Stars of the NBA G League. He played for Grand Rapids Christian High School, where he was a McDonald's All-American in 2021, and played college basketball for the Michigan Wolverines, earning third-team All-Big Ten honors in 2023. He was selected with the 15th overall pick in the 2023 NBA draft by the Atlanta Hawks, where he played for two seasons. He also played for the Los Angeles Lakers for one season.

== High school career ==
Kobe Bufkin was born in Grand Rapids, Michigan to Kimberly Camp and Michael Bufkin. When he was five years old, he stated that he wanted to play for the Michigan Wolverines football team. Bufkin played basketball for Grand Rapids Christian High School in Grand Rapids, Michigan. He joined the varsity team as a freshman. Entering his sophomore season, he was in the lower half of the 16 sophomores listed among the top 100 players in the state, according to the Detroit Free Press. On February 27, 2019, Bufkin scored 35 in a 71–63 Michigan High School Athletic Association (MHSAA) district semifinal season-ending loss to Catholic Central High School of Grand Rapids. As a sophomore, Bufkin averaged 20 points, 7 rebounds and 3 assists per game, helping his team achieve a 16–6 record. Following the season, he was recognized as a Division 2 second team All-state selection by the Associated Press in a year that Romeo Weems was selected as the Division 2 Michigan state player of the year.

Prior to his junior season, the Detroit Free Press ranked him as the best junior in the state and the sixth-best player in the state. Bufkin was among several elite recruits (along with Emoni Bates, Caleb Furst and others) on hand at the Breslin Student Events Center on February 15, 2020, when Michigan State hosted Maryland and celebrated the 20th anniversary of the national championship season of the 1999–2000 Michigan State Spartans. By early March, Bufkin had an offer from Michigan State. Bufkin reported an offer from Michigan on April 24. In his junior season, he averaged 22 points, 5 rebounds and 4 assists per game, leading his team to a 20–2 record. Following the season, he was recognized as a Division 2 first team all-state selection by the Associated Press in a year that Carlos 'Scooby' Johnson was honored as the Division 2 Michigan state player of the year. Following the COVID-19 pandemic in the United States-related premature conclusion of the season in which Bufkin's Grand Rapids Christian finished with a 20–2 record, Bufkin listed Michigan State, Michigan, DePaul, LSU and Ohio State as his final five on July 7. At the time Bufkin was 6 ft 4 in (1.93 m), 175 pounds (79 kg) and ranked 78th in the national class of 2021, 15th among shooting guards and third in the state of Michigan by the 247Sports composite rankings. Three days later he announced his verbal commitment to Michigan which pushed Michigan's 2021 class from the 5th-ranked class to the 3rd ranked. By the time of his signing on November 11, 2020, he was the 63 ranked member of the class of 2021.

As a senior, Bufkin averaged 25 points, 7 rebounds and 5 assists per game in five games, before missing most of the COVID-delayed/shortened season with a fractured left wrist on February 20, 2021. A week before his injury, Bufkin had been ranked as the number 2 (Pierre Brooks II, #1) player in the state of Michigan by the Detroit Free Press. Before the injury, Bufkin had been named as a preseason SI All-American candidate by Sports Illustrated. Bufkin was named to the McDonald's All-American Game and Jordan Brand Classic rosters. Diabaté, Houstan and Bufkin, were the University of Michigan's first McDonald's All-Americans since Daniel Horton in 2002. Bufkin was the state of Michigan's first McDonald's All-American since Deyonta Davis in 2015. It was the fifth time that the University of Michigan had had multiple McDonald's All-American selections (first since Louis Bullock, Robert Traylor and Albert White in 1995) and the third time that they had three or more. By the time of the announcement, Bufkin was ranked 42 according to 247Sports. Bufkin finished third in the Mr. Basketball of Michigan voting by the Basketball Coaches Association of Michigan members. Brooks (Douglass Academy for Young Men/Michigan State) won with 2,889 points, and he was followed by Foster Wonders (Iron Mountain High School/Southern Illinois) with 2,573 points ahead of Bufkin's 2,143 points. Bufkin was again recognized as a Division 2 first team All-state selection by the Associated Press, but Ke'Ontae Barnes was chosen as Division 2 Michigan state player of the year. Barnes had not been one of the five finalists for Mr. Basketball of Michigan.

=== Recruiting ===
A consensus four-star recruit, Bufkin committed to playing college basketball for Michigan over offers from a set of finalists that also included LSU, DePaul, Michigan State and Ohio State. Other schools known to have made Bufkin offers included Missouri, Northwestern and TCU. He was drawn to Michigan by assistant coach Saddi Washington who was retained when Juwan Howard took over from John Beilein. Bufkin marked Howard's first instate commitment since becoming Michigan head coach the year before. Along with Caleb Houstan and Moussa Diabaté, he was part of a recruiting class that was the top-ranked class in the nation according to ESPN, Rivals.com and 247Sports for the 2021–22 Michigan Wolverines. The individual player rankings at the time of signing were Houstan at 8, Diabaté at 20, Frankie Collins at 59, Bufkin at 63, Isaiah Barnes at 114 and Will Tschetter at 155.

College recruiting
Name	Hometown	School	Height	Weight	Commit date
Kobe Bufkin; SG	Grand Rapids, MI	Grand Rapids Christian (MI)	6 ft 4 in (1.93 m)	180 lb (82 kg)	Jul 10, 2020
Kobe Bufkin; SG	Recruit ratings: Rivals: 247Sports: ESPN: (87)				
Overall recruit ranking: Rivals: 51 247Sports: 44 ESPN: 40
Note: In many cases, Scout, Rivals, 247Sports, On3, and ESPN may conflict in their listings of height and weight.; In these cases, the average was taken. ESPN grades are on a 100-point scale.; Sources: "Michigan 2021 Basketball Commitments". Rivals.; "2021 Michigan Wolverines Recruiting Class". ESPN.; "2021 Team Ranking". Rivals.

== College career ==
The 2021–22 Michigan Wolverines opened the season ranked sixth in the national polls. Bufkin enrolled at Michigan at the age of 17. As a freshman for the Wolverines, Bufkin averaged three points and 1.1 rebounds per game in 10.6 minutes per game. On December 20, 2021, he earned co-Big Ten freshman of the week honors for his first double-digit scoring effort on December 18 against Southern Utah when he posted 11 points and 3 rebounds. He also reached double digits with 10 against Iowa on February 17, 2022. In the 2022 NCAA Division I men's basketball tournament, Michigan defeated (No. 24 AP poll) Colorado State, and (No. 5 AP poll/No. 8 Coaches Poll) Tennessee. In the Sweet Sixteen, they lost to (No. 6 AP poll/No. 5 Coaches Poll) Villanova.

The 2022–23 Michigan Wolverines opened the season ranked twenty-second in the national polls. As a sophomore, Bufkin remained the youngest player on the team. He picked up a lot of minutes as a sophomore following the 2022 departures of Brooks, Jones and Frankie Collins. In fact, he led the team with 34 minutes played per game and posted averages of 14 points, 4.5 rebounds and 2.9 assists. On December 8, Michigan defeated Minnesota 90–75 in its Big Ten Conference season opener. Both Bufkin and teammate Dug McDaniel established new career highs with 15 points each. He posted a then-career-high 22 points in back-to-back games against Lipscomb (December 17) and North Carolina in the Jumpman Invitational (December 21). On February 2, 2023, Bufkin contributed 15 points and a career-high 12 rebounds, for his first career double-double as well as a career-high eight assists against Northwestern. On February 26, Bufkin led Michigan with a career-high 28 points in an 87–79 overtime victory over Wisconsin. Following the regular season, he earned All-Big Ten third-team recognition from the media and honorable mention recognition from the coaches. On March 14, Michigan began their participation in the 2023 National Invitation Tournament with a 90–80 victory over Toledo in the first round. Michigan was led by Bufkin with a game-high 23 points, eight rebounds and five assists. Michigan lost to Vanderbilt in the second round. In the offseason, he participated in the NBA draft combine at Wintrust Arena.

== Professional career ==
=== Atlanta Hawks (2023–2025) ===
The Atlanta Hawks selected Bufkin with the fifteenth overall pick in the 2023 NBA draft. Bufkin had been projected to be selected in the teens by several NBA draft prognosticators. Almost all draft experts felt that Bufkin was a very good selection by the Hawks at 15. On July 3, 2023, Bufkin signed a rookie-scale contract with the Atlanta Hawks. Bufkin played for Atlanta in the 2023 NBA Summer League in the unfamiliar role as point guard. In his debut, he posted eight points, four rebounds, three assists and two steals, but did so on a night with five personal fouls, eight turnovers, 4-of-14 field goal shooting, including going 0 for 8 on three-point shots as a point guard, even though he had been practicing as a shooting guard. That year the summer league boasted two players vying to be the second player to play in the NBA named Kobe (the other was Kobe Brown). Both were named after Kobe Bryant. In the 99–98 July 13 Summer League win against the Philadelphia 76ers, Bufkin had 7 assists and hit the game-winning shot with 12.6 seconds remaining. Bufkin got more playing time than any other Hawk in the summer league (27.1 minutes). He posted averages of 14 points, 3.6 assists and 3.2 rebounds. However, he was tasked with developing his skills as a playmaker for others during the summer league and it resulted in 4.6 turnovers per game. Although his defense was strong, he showed that he needed to develop strengthwise and with his playmaking decisions. Bufkin's NBA preseason debut was also inauspicious: nine points on 4-of-11 shooting from the field (including 1-of-6 three-point shooting), one assist, one rebound and four personal fouls.

Bufkin debuted on October 29 in Atlanta's third game (but first win) of the season against the Milwaukee Bucks playing 3 minutes and 14 seconds and making 1 of 2 free throws to score his first NBA point; He was 0 of 2 from the field. Although Brown debuted before him on October 25, both players scored their first points on October 29. Bufkin likely scored first because he scored his points in the Central Time Zone of Milwaukee, while Brown scored his first points at home for the Los Angeles Clippers in the Pacific Time Zone. After appearing in two of Atlanta's first five games Bufkin fractured his thumb on November 3.

When Bufkin's thumb healed, he was assigned to the Hawks' NBA G-League affiliate, the College Park Skyhawks and posted performances of 34, 29, 33 and 27 points in his first four games for them. On January 29, 2024, Bufkin posted 43 points for the Skyhawks. In 14 appearances with the Skyhawks, Bufkin averaged 23.6 points, 5.9 assists, 5.4 rebounds and 1.4 steals with four performances of 30 points or more.

When 2024 NBA All-Star Trae Young required surgery on a ligament of a finger on his left hand in late February 2024, Bufkin was thrust into the main rotation. At the time of the Young's injury, the Hawks had exceeded Trent Forrest's two-way contract eligibility limits and had to cut Patty Mills to make roster space. Then, Bufkin seemed to overtake Forrest in the rotation. In his first four games with the Hawks after Young's injury, Bufkin averaged 6 points, 3.5 assists and 2 rebounds, including a career-high 12 points on February 29 against Brooklyn. However, after those four games Bufkin was in a boot with a big toe injury. On March 7, he was diagnosed with a left big toe sprain that required 10 days of immobilization before re-evaluation. His return was delayed 7 to 10 more days on March 21. On April 1, he was announced as available for his first action since March 2. Upon his April 1 return to action after missing 14 games, Bufkin was back in the main rotation, displacing Forrest as the backup point guard, and at times playing simultaneously with point guard Dejounte Murray as the shooting guard. He showed potential in his return, especially in a defensive assignment against Kyrie Irving.

Bufkin played in 10 games for Atlanta in the 2024–25 NBA season, averaging 5.3 points, 2.1 rebounds, and 1.7 assists. On December 18, 2024, it was announced that Bufkin would undergo season–ending surgery to address right shoulder instability. He returned to action in the 2025 NBA Summer League and averaged 19.5 points, 5.2 rebounds, 4.2 assists and 1.0 steals during 26.5 minutes of play.

On September 16, 2025, Bufkin was traded from the Hawks to the Brooklyn Nets in exchange for cash considerations. He was waived by Brooklyn prior to the start of the regular season on October 19.

=== Los Angeles / South Bay Lakers (2025–2026) ===
On November 13, Bufkin was traded to the South Bay Lakers of the NBA G League by the Motor City Cruise for a 2027 first-round pick in the G League draft. At the time LeBron James was rehabilitating with South Bay. Bufkin debuted for South Bay on November 16 with 16 points and 7 rebounds to help South Bay remain unbeaten (3–0) for the season with a 113–111 victory over the Rip City Remix. In his first 2 games he averaged 22.0 points, 6.5 rebounds, 4.0 assists and 1.0 steals in 28.7 minutes before being called up.

On November 23, 2025, Bufkin signed a 10-day hardship deal with the Memphis Grizzlies. Following the expiration of his 10-day callup, in which he did not appear in any games, he returned to the Lakers.

After appearing in 14 games for South Bay and averaging 25.2 points (including 2.9 three-point shots), 5.1 rebounds, 5.1 assists, 1.3 steals and 0.8 blocks in 32.5 minutes, Bufkin signed a 10-day contract with the Los Angeles Lakers on Tuesday, January 13, 2026. Bufkin is one of at least seven South Bay players to spend time with the Lakers, following two-way players Drew Timme, Nick Smith Jr. and Chris Mañon, as well as call-ups Bronny James, Adou Thiero, and Dalton Knecht. Following the 10-day contract, Bufkin returned to the South Bay Lakers, taking the place of James Reese. The Lakers had limited options at the February 5 trade deadline. On February 8, 2026, following trade deadline roster moves, Bufkin was signed to a standard two-year contract to fill the 15th roster spot. At the time of the signing, Bufkin was the leading scorer in the G League. During his stint with the team, Bufkin averaged 2.9 points in 7.4 minutes. Ultimately, the Lakers decided to waive Bufkin on April 10.

=== New Orleans Pelicans/Utah Jazz/Salt Lake City Stars (2026-present) ===
Bufkin was signed by the New Orleans Pelicans for the 2026 NBA Summer League. After shooting 21% on his three point shots in three NBA seasons, he needed to demonstrate an improved outside shot. In the Pelicans' summer league debut, he posted a game-high 30 points (including 5–9 three point shooting) 6 rebounds, 2 assists and a block. Following the Summer League, Bufkin was signed to a one-year contract. However, his time with the team would be cut short after the team waived him on October 17, 2026.

The Utah Jazz/Salt Lake City Stars signed him to a two-way contract on October 24.

== Personal life ==
Kobe Bufkin is the son of Mike Bufkin and Kimberly Camp. Bufkin's parents were fans of the Michigan men's basketball team since the Fab Five era, and named his brothers after Michael Jordan and Isiah Thomas, but the family debates about whether Kobe was really named after Kobe Bryant.

== Career statistics ==
Legend
GP	Games played	GS	Games started	MPG	Minutes per game
FG%	Field goal percentage	3P%	3-point field goal percentage	FT%	Free throw percentage
RPG	Rebounds per game	APG	Assists per game	SPG	Steals per game
BPG	Blocks per game	PPG	Points per game	**Bold**	Career high

=== NBA ===
Year	Team	GP	GS	MPG	FG%	3P%	FT%	RPG	APG	SPG	BPG	PPG
2023–24	Atlanta	**17**	0	11.5	.370	**.225**	.500	1.9	1.6	**.4**	**.3**	4.8
2024–25	Atlanta	10	0	**12.4**	**.383**	.211	.722	**2.1**	**1.7**	.3	.2	**5.3**
2025–26	L.A. Lakers	16	**1**	7.4	.300	.192	**.917**	.8	.6	.1	.2	2.9
Career		43	1	10.2	.354	.212	.737	1.6	1.3	.3	.2	4.2

=== College ===
Year	Team	GP	GS	MPG	FG%	3P%	FT%	RPG	APG	SPG	BPG	PPG
2021–22	Michigan	28	0	10.6	.380	.222	.773	1.1	.3	.4	.1	3.0
2022–23	Michigan	**33**	**33**	**34.0**	**.482**	**.355**	**.849**	**4.5**	**2.9**	**1.3**	**.7**	**14.0**
Career		61	33	23.3	.463	.325	.833	3.0	1.7	.9	.4	9.0
