= Emoni Bates =

American basketball player (born 2004)

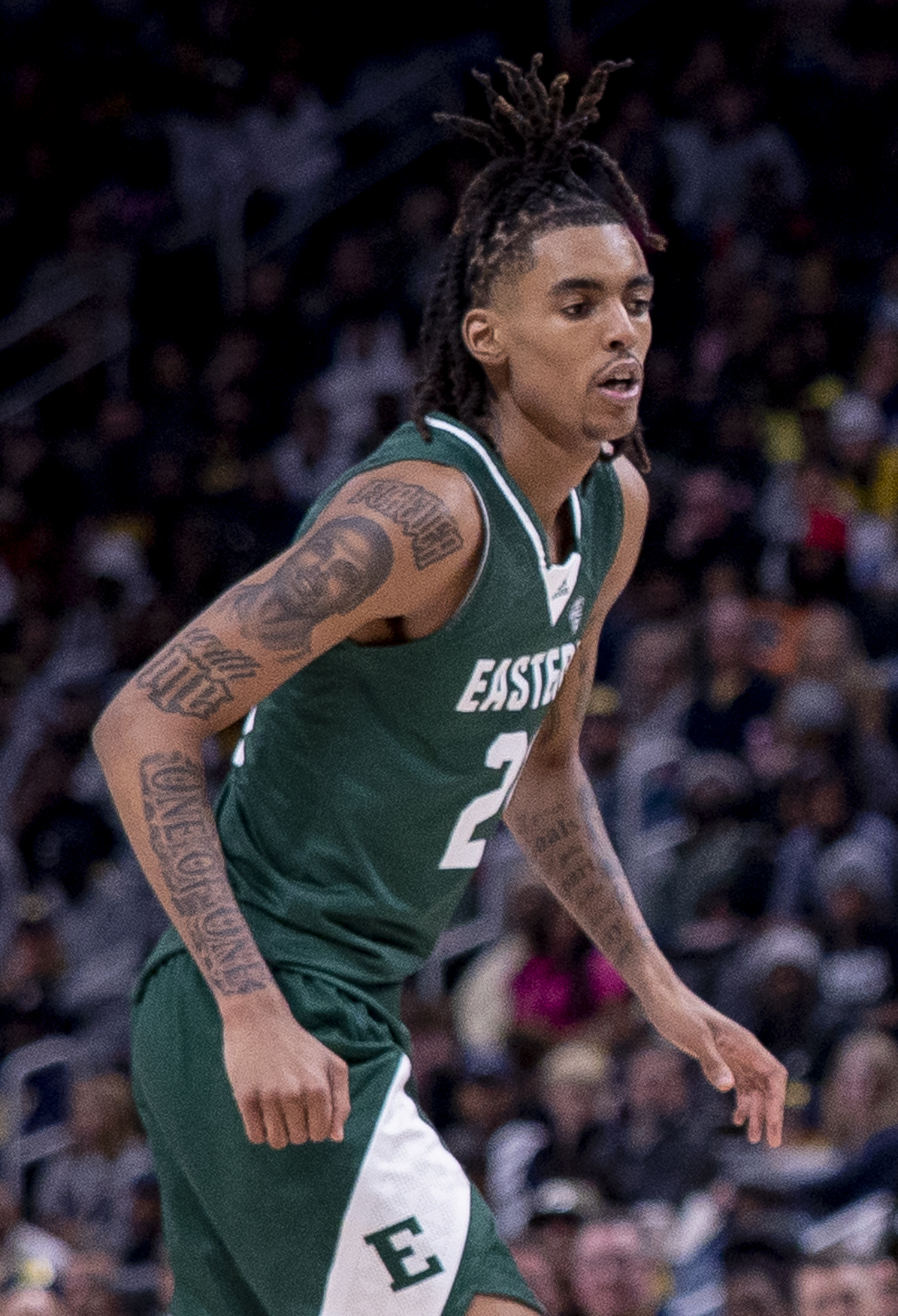
- Bates with Eastern Michigan in 2022

Free agent
- Position: Small forward

Personal information
- Born: January 28, 2004 (age 22) Ann Arbor, Michigan, U.S.
- Listed height: 6 ft 9 in (2.06 m)
- Listed weight: 202 lb (92 kg)

Career information
- High school: Lincoln (Ypsilanti, Michigan); Ypsi Prep Academy (Ypsilanti, Michigan)
- College: Memphis (2021–2022); Eastern Michigan (2022–2023)
- NBA draft: 2023: 2nd round, 49th overall pick
- Drafted by: Cleveland Cavaliers
- Playing career: 2023–present

Career history
- 2023–2025: Cleveland Cavaliers
- 2023–2025: →Cleveland Charge
- 2025: Delaware Blue Coats
- 2025: Texas Legends

Career highlights
- NBA G League Next Up Game (2024); Third-team All-MAC (2023); Gatorade National Player of the Year (2020)
- Stats at NBA.com
- Stats at Basketball Reference

Emoni James-Wayne Bates (/iˈmɒni/ ee-MON-ee; born January 28, 2004) is an American professional basketball player who most recently played for the Texas Legends of the NBA G League. He played college basketball for the Memphis Tigers and the Eastern Michigan Eagles.

In his first two years of high school, Bates played basketball for Lincoln High School in his hometown Ypsilanti, Michigan, where he was heavily touted by the national media and rated as the top recruit in his class. He led Lincoln to a state championship as a freshman and became the first sophomore to win the Gatorade National Player of the Year boys' award. For his junior season, Bates transferred to Ypsi Prep Academy, a new school created by his father. A former Michigan State commit, he opted to graduate early from high school and start his college career at Memphis.

As a freshman at Memphis, Bates missed time with injuries and fell sharply in NBA draft projections after not meeting expectations. He transferred to his hometown team Eastern Michigan for his sophomore season. He was drafted with the 49th pick in the 2023 NBA draft by the Cleveland Cavaliers.

== Early life and career ==
Bates was born in the University of Michigan hospital in Ann Arbor. He began playing basketball from age three, often sleeping with a miniature basketball under his arm and dribbling around his house. In his childhood, Bates trained for basketball with his father, a former professional player, by shooting around and improving his agility through various drills. In fourth grade, he played against high school seniors at a rec league in Saline, Michigan and started competing on the Amateur Athletic Union (AAU) circuit. Bates also played soccer while in elementary school.

Bates first surfaced on the national radar in early 2016, after averaging 28 points and 12 rebounds per game for the Toledo Wildcats AAU team at a tournament in Chicago. He grew from 6 feet 2 inches (1.88 m) to 6 feet 7 inches (2.01 m) from sixth to seventh grade. Bates played basketball for Clague Middle School in Ann Arbor, Michigan, where as a seventh-grader, he was rated the number one player in the 2022 class by recruiting website Future150. He averaged 46 points per game in seventh grade and sat out his eighth grade season to train individually. In the summer of 2018, Bates averaged 17 points per game facing older competition at the under-15 division of the Nike Elite Youth Basketball League (EYBL), a notable summer circuit.

== High school career ==
=== Freshman season ===
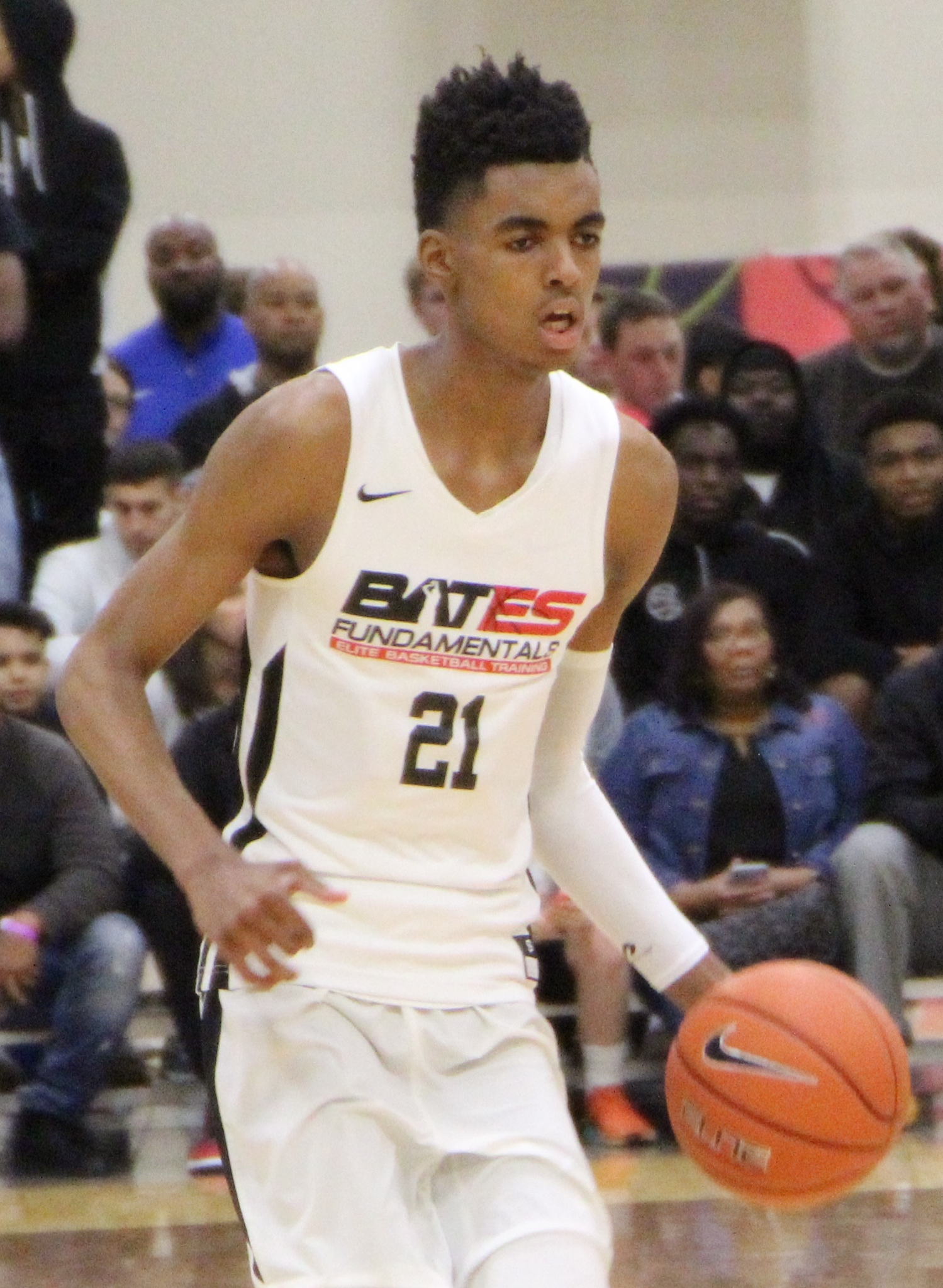
Bates with Bates Fundamentals at the Nike EYBL in May 2019

Bates enrolled at Lincoln High School in Ypsilanti, Michigan, being drawn there because the head basketball coach, Jesse Davis, was a longtime teammate and friend of Bates' father. On November 26, 2018, Bates made his freshman season debut, recording 32 points and 15 rebounds in an 80–69 win over Ann Arbor Huron at the Ypsilanti Tip-Off Classic. On January 18, 2019, he scored a then-career-high 43 points, shooting 13-of-27 from the field, in a 68–56 victory over Ypsilanti Community High School. Bates, on February 5, was ejected and suspended one game for his role in an altercation during a game versus Dexter High School. On February 18, he posted 36 points and 19 rebounds in a 73–65 win over Jackson High School to capture the Michigan High School Athletic Association (MHSAA) Southeastern Conference White division title.

On March 7, he led all scorers with 36 points and made the game-winning shot in an 81–79 victory over Detroit Catholic Central High School, as Lincoln claimed its first regional championship. Nine days later, Bates guided Lincoln to its first MHSAA Division 1 state title after scoring 23 points in a 64–62 win over top-seeded University of Detroit Jesuit High School and Academy. He finished the season averaging 28.5 points and 10.2 rebounds per game, helping his team to a 23–4 record. Bates was named Michigan Gatorade Player of the Year and MaxPreps National Freshman of the Year. He also earned Associated Press (AP) Division 1 Player of the Year and All-State first team honors. Mick McCabe of the Detroit Free Press labeled Bates as the "best freshman to ever play in Michigan," while Evan Daniels of 247Sports mentioned him as possibly the best high school prospect since LeBron James.

=== Sophomore season ===
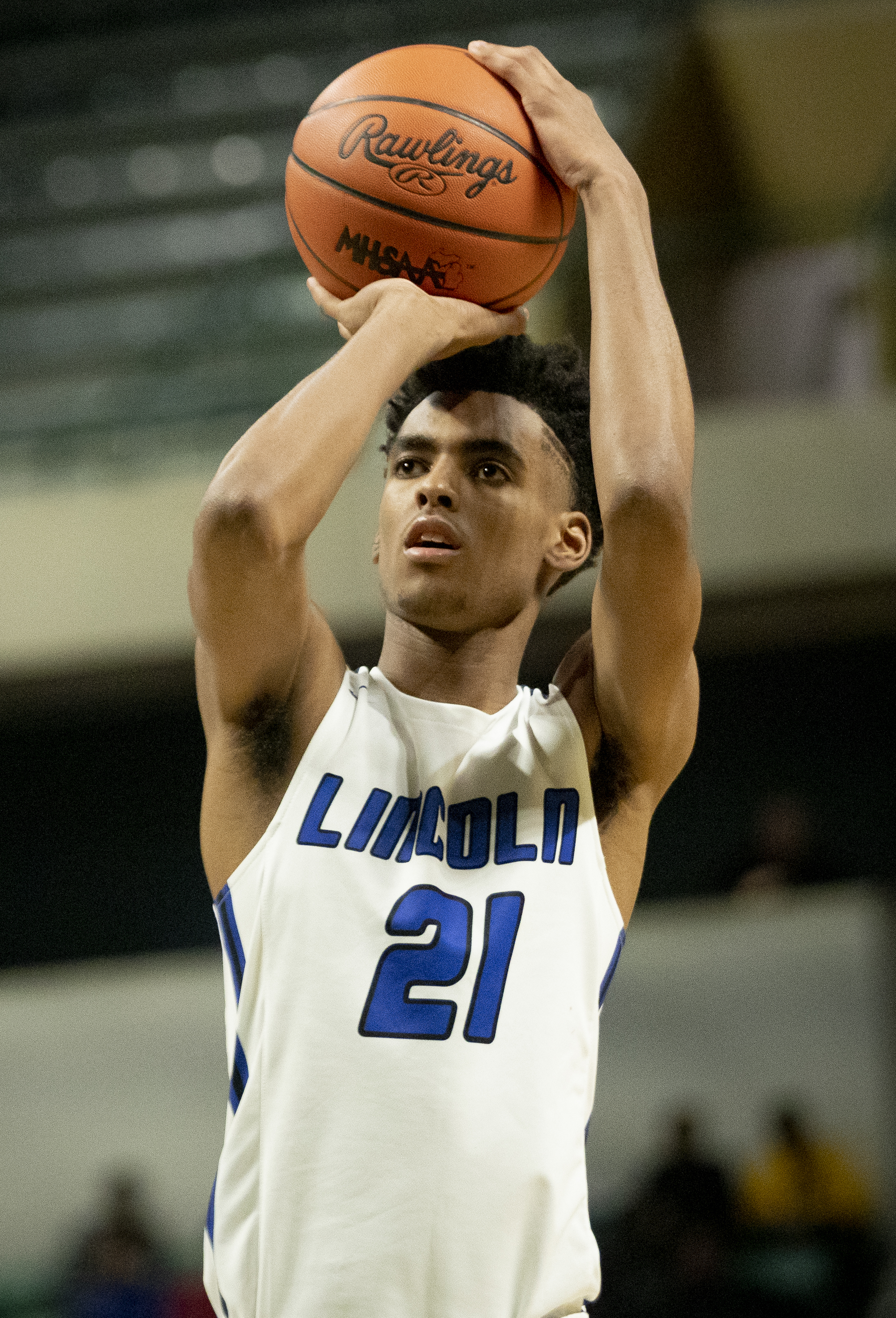
Bates shoots a free throw for Lincoln High School in December 2019.

Entering his sophomore season, Bates appeared on the cover of the November 4, 2019 issue of Sports Illustrated. In his season debut, he scored 24 points but was held back to 6-of-21 shooting in a loss to River Rouge High School. On January 17, 2020, Bates scored 40 points in a 67–38 victory over Dexter High School. He tallied 42 points on January 27 in an 83–56 win over Jackson High School. During the game, Bates wore a number 24 jersey to honor his childhood idol, Kobe Bryant, who had died in a helicopter crash in the previous day. On February 18, he established new career highs of 63 points and 21 rebounds in a 108–102 double overtime victory over Chelsea High School. Three days later, Bates recorded 40 points and 12 rebounds in a 67–60 overtime win over Ypsilanti Community High School. On March 5, he had 48 points and 13 rebounds to lead his team past Catholic Central High School by a score of 79–48.

On March 9, during a win over Pioneer High School in the first round of the state playoffs, Bates was involved in a skirmish that resulted in a double technical foul and the ejection of an opposing player. He was unable to help Lincoln defend its Division 1 state title after the MHSAA suspended winter postseason tournaments due to the coronavirus pandemic. As a sophomore, he averaged 32.3 points, nine rebounds, three assists and 2.1 steals per game, shooting 50 percent from the field and 37 percent from three-point range, and led his team to a 19–3 record. Bates was recognized as Gatorade National Player of the Year, becoming the first sophomore to win the boys' version of the award, (Note: The first player to win the Gatorade award as a sophomore was Azzi Fudd, who won the girls' award in 2019.) as well as MaxPreps National Sophomore of the Year. He was named Michigan AP Division 1 Player of the Year and Michigan Gatorade Player of the Year for a second straight season.

=== Junior season ===
Before his junior season, Bates announced that he would transfer to Ypsi Prep Academy, a new prep school in Ypsilanti created by his father. On November 12, 2020, he made his debut with the program, scoring 36 points in a 78–71 exhibition game loss to Chet Holmgren and Team Sizzle. As a junior, Bates averaged 23 points, 5.8 rebounds, three assists and 2.2 steals per game, leading his team to a 7–3 record. He was one of five finalists for the Naismith Prep Player of the Year Award. After the season, he reclassified up to the 2021 class and bypassed his senior year of high school.

=== Recruiting ===
Bates was a consensus five-star recruit and one of the top players in the 2021 class, according to major recruiting services. He received a scholarship offer from NCAA Division I program DePaul in eighth grade. After his freshman season in high school, Bates was offered scholarships by Michigan State, Michigan and Duke. By then, he was being touted by analysts and scouts as the top high school basketball prospect regardless of class. Following Bates' junior season, however, 247Sports remarked that he "looks to have hit a bit of a roadblock in his development." Both 247Sports and Rivals began to consider him the second-best player in his class behind Jalen Duren. On August 4, 2021, Bates reclassified from the 2022 class to the 2021 class. Upon his reclassification, he was ranked third, fourth and fifth in his class by ESPN, Rivals and 247Sports, respectively.

On June 29, 2020, during a live interview on SportsCenter, Bates announced his commitment to play college basketball for Michigan State. He was drawn to the program by head coach Tom Izzo and the school's coaching staff, who had been building a relationship with him since he was in seventh grade. At the time, Bates was the highest-rated recruit to commit to Michigan State in the modern recruiting era. On April 30, 2021, he decommitted from Michigan State and reopened his recruitment, saying that he was exploring college and professional options. On August 24, Bates committed to Memphis to play for head coach Penny Hardaway and alongside his close friend, Jalen Duren; his other three finalists were Michigan State, Oregon and the NBA G League.

College recruiting
Name	Hometown	School	Height	Weight	Commit date
Emoni Bates; SF	Ypsilanti, MI	Ypsi Prep Academy (MI)	6 ft 9 in (2.06 m)	200 lb (91 kg)	Aug 25, 2021
Emoni Bates; SF	Recruit ratings: Rivals: 247Sports: ESPN: (97)				
Overall recruit ranking: Rivals: 4 247Sports: 5 ESPN: 3
Note: In many cases, Scout, Rivals, 247Sports, On3, and ESPN may conflict in their listings of height and weight.; In these cases, the average was taken. ESPN grades are on a 100-point scale.; Sources: "Memphis 2021 Basketball Commitments". Rivals.; "2021 Memphis Tigers Recruiting Class". ESPN.; "2021 Team Ranking". Rivals.

== College career ==
=== Freshman season ===
Bates, at age 17, entered his freshman season at Memphis as the youngest player in college basketball. On November 9, 2021, he made his college debut, recording a season-high 17 points, four rebounds and four assists in an 89–65 win against Tennessee Tech. He was named American Athletic Conference (AAC) Freshman of the Week on November 15, after two games. As Memphis began facing stronger competition, head coach Penny Hardaway moved Bates to point guard, a position he had not played in high school, and he struggled in his new role. In December, he suffered a finger injury that caused him to miss three games. Bates later missed 12 games, including the AAC tournament, with a lower back injury and returned for the NCAA tournament. In 18 games as a freshman, he averaged 9.7 points and 3.3 rebounds, shooting 38.6 percent from the field, and drastically fell in NBA draft projections.

=== Sophomore season ===
For his sophomore season, Bates transferred to Eastern Michigan, his hometown college team, after also considering Michigan, Arkansas, Seton Hall, DePaul and Louisville. Before the season, on September 19, 2022, he was suspended by the team after being arrested on gun charges in the previous day. Bates was reinstated on October 13 following a plea deal that would lead to the charges being dropped. He did not play in the team's season-opener against Wayne State for undisclosed reasons. On November 11, Bates made his debut for Eastern Michigan and led his team with 30 points in an 88–83 loss to Michigan. Against Toledo on January 24, 2023, Bates scored 29 straight points for Eastern Michigan in the first half. That was all he scored in that half, as he ended with 43 points in a 84–79 loss. In 30 games at Eastern Michigan during the 2022–23 season, he averaged 19.2 points and 5.8 rebounds. He was named third-team All-MAC. On April 24, 2023, Bates entered his name in the 2023 NBA draft.

== Professional career ==
=== Cleveland Cavaliers (2023–2025) ===
Bates was selected with the 49th overall pick of the 2023 NBA draft by the Cleveland Cavaliers. On July 7, 2023, the Cavaliers signed him to a two-way contract. Under the terms of the deal, he split time between the Cavaliers and their NBA G League affiliate, the Cleveland Charge.

On August 20, 2024, Bates signed another two-way contract with the Cavaliers. On October 7, Bates underwent arthroscopic surgery to repair a torn meniscus in his right knee. His recovery timetable was set at around one month. On April 13, 2025, Bates scored a career-high 25 points in Cleveland's regular season finale, a 126-118 double overtime loss to the Indiana Pacers. In 10 total appearances for the Cavaliers during the 2024–25 NBA season, Bates averaged 3.7 points, 0.7 rebounds, and 0.8 assists.

=== Delaware Blue Coats (2025) ===
On September 23, 2025, Bates signed an Exhibit 10 contract with the Philadelphia 76ers. On October 14, Bates was waived by the 76ers and then signed with the Delaware Blue Coats of the NBA G League.

=== Texas Legends (2025) ===
On December 11, 2025, Bates was traded to the Texas Legends in exchange for the returning player rights to Charles Bassey.

== Career statistics ==
Legend
GP	Games played	GS	Games started	MPG	Minutes per game
FG%	Field goal percentage	3P%	3-point field goal percentage	FT%	Free throw percentage
RPG	Rebounds per game	APG	Assists per game	SPG	Steals per game
BPG	Blocks per game	PPG	Points per game	**Bold**	Career high

=== NBA ===
Year	Team	GP	GS	MPG	FG%	3P%	FT%	RPG	APG	SPG	BPG	PPG
2023–24	Cleveland	**15**	0	**8.9**	.306	.303	**.250**	**.9**	.7	**.1**	**.1**	2.7
2024–25	Cleveland	10	0	7.5	**.342**	**.367**	—	.7	**.8**	**.1**	**.1**	**3.7**
Career		25	0	8.3	.322	.333	.250	.8	.7	.1	.1	3.1

=== College ===
Year	Team	GP	GS	MPG	FG%	3P%	FT%	RPG	APG	SPG	BPG	PPG
2021–22	Memphis	18	13	23.4	.386	.329	.646	3.3	1.3	.6	.3	9.7
2022–23	Eastern Michigan	**30**	**29**	**33.8**	**.405**	**.330**	**.782**	**5.8**	**1.4**	**.7**	**.5**	**19.2**
Career		48	42	29.9	.400	.330	.749	4.8	1.4	.7	.5	15.6
