= 2022–23 Ohio Bobcats men's basketball team =

American college basketball season

2022–23 Ohio Bobcats men's basketball
- Conference: Mid-American Conference
- Record: 19–14 (10–8 MAC)
- Head coach: Jeff Boals (4th season)
- Assistant coaches: Lamar Thornton (4th season); Kyle Barlow (4th season); Lee Martin (3rd season)
- Home arena: Convocation Center

2022–23 Mid-American Conference men's basketball standings
	Conf.				Overall
Team	W		L	PCT	W		L	PCT
Toledo	16	–	2	.889	27	–	8	.771
Kent State †	15	–	3	.833	28	–	7	.800
Akron	13	–	5	.722	22	–	11	.667
Ball State	11	–	7	.611	20	–	12	.625
Ohio	10	–	8	.556	19	–	14	.576
Buffalo	9	–	9	.500	15	–	17	.469
Northern Illinois	9	–	9	.500	13	–	19	.406
Miami (OH)	6	–	12	.333	12	–	20	.375
Bowling Green	5	–	13	.278	11	–	20	.355
Eastern Michigan	5	–	13	.278	8	–	23	.258
Central Michigan	5	–	13	.278	10	–	21	.323
Western Michigan	4	–	14	.222	8	–	23	.258
† 2023 MAC tournament winner

The 2022–23 Ohio University Bobcats men's basketball team represented Ohio University for the 2022–23 NCAA Division I men's basketball season. The Bobcats were led by fourth-year head coach Jeff Boals, who was a 1995 graduate of Ohio University. They played their home games at the Convocation Center in Athens, Ohio as a member of the Mid-American Conference.

Ohio started the season slow after key player losses from the prior year. They also started conference play slowly with several difficult road games in January. They recovered in February and won seven out of their last nine regular season games to head into the MAC tournament at 18–13 as the fifth seed with a 10–8 conference record. They defeated Ball State in the first round of the MAC tournament before losing to top-seeded Toledo to finish 19–14.

== Previous season ==
The Bobcats finished the 2021–22 season 25–10 and 14–6 in MAC play to finish in third place. As the No. 3 seed in the MAC tournament, they defeated Ball State before losing to Kent State in the semi-finals. They received a bid to the CBI. There they defeated Rice in the first round before losing to Abilene Christian in the second round.

== Offseason ==
Ohio had a lot of roster turnover. Eleven of the sixteen players that had minutes the prior season either graduated, left the team, or transferred. Three key starters had to be replaced. Jason Carter graduated while Ben Vander Plas and Mark Sears transferred to high-major programs. Dwight Wilson III redshirted the previous season due to injury and returned for his final year.

=== Coaching Staff Changes ===
==== Coaching Additions ====
Coaching Additions
Name	Alma Mater	Previous position	New position
Mike Cifliku	Ohio University	Graduate Assistant	Video Coordinator
Casey Crawford	Ohio University	Student Manager	Graduate Assistant

=== Departures ===
Departures
Name	Number	Pos.	Height	Weight	Year	Hometown	Reason
Mark Sears	1	G	6'1"	185	Sophomore	Muscle Shoals, Alabama	Transferred to Alabama
Ben Vander Plas	5	F	6'8"	232	Senior	Ripon, Wisconsin	Transferred to Virginia
Sam Towns	11	F	6'9"	190	Sophomore	Columbus, Ohio	Transferred to Bowling Green
John Tenerowicz*	12	G	6'1"	185	Senior	Cleveland, Ohio	Transferred to Tiffin
Luke Frazier*	13	G	6'5"	170	Freshman	Mentor, Ohio	Transferred to John Carroll
Michael Brown, Jr.*	14	G	5'10"	156	Junior	Rochester, New York	Left team for personal reasons
Lunden McDay	15	G	6'4"	185	Junior	Akron, Ohio	Left team for personal reasons
Tommy Schmock	22	G	5'11"	180	Senior	Cleveland, Ohio	Graduated, Exhausted eligibility
Josh McDaniel*	24	G	6'4"	230	Senior	Westerville, Ohio	Returned to student manager role
Jason Carter	30	F	6'8"	227	RS Senior	Johnstown, Ohio	Graduated, Exhausted eligibility
Colin Granger	32	F	6'9"	239	Sophomore	Suwanee, Georgia	Transferred to Western Carolina

* Walk-on in 2021-22

=== Incoming transfers ===
Incoming transfers
Name	Number	Pos.	Height	Weight	Year	Hometown	Reason
Jaylin Hunter	12	G	5'11"	195	Junior	Manchester, Connecticut	Transferred from Old Dominion. Will have two years of eligibility remaining.
Gabe Wiznitzer	11	C	6'11"	240	Sophomore	Walhalla, South Carolina	Transferred from Louisville. Will have three years of eligibility remaining.
DeVon Baker	22	G	6'2"	190	Junior	Dayton, Ohio	Transferred from Tulane. Will have one year of eligibility remaining.

=== Recruiting class ===
College recruiting
Name	Hometown	School	Height	Weight	Commit date
Ajay Sheldon; PG	Dublin, OH	Dublin Coffman	6 ft 1 in (1.85 m)	170 lb (77 kg)	
Ajay Sheldon; PG	Recruit ratings: Scout: Rivals: 247Sports: (NR)				
AJ Brown; SG	Orlando, FL	Orlando Christian Prep	6 ft 4 in (1.93 m)	170 lb (77 kg)	Sep 5, 2021
AJ Brown; SG	Recruit ratings: Scout: Rivals: 247Sports: (82)				
Aidan Hadaway; SF	Lafayette, GA	Lafayette	6 ft 8 in (2.03 m)	190 lb (86 kg)	Jul 29, 2021
Aidan Hadaway; SF	Recruit ratings: Scout: Rivals: 247Sports: (NR)				
Elmore James IV; SG	Cleveland, OH	Brush	6 ft 3 in (1.91 m)	N/A	Aug 9, 2021
Elmore James IV; SG	Recruit ratings: Scout: Rivals: 247Sports: (NR)				
Ben Estis*; PG	Southlake, TX	Southlake Carroll	6 ft 0 in (1.83 m)	160 lb (73 kg)	
Ben Estis*; PG	Recruit ratings: Scout: Rivals: 247Sports: (NR)				
Quinn Corna*; SG	Columbus, OH	Upper Arlington	6 ft 3 in (1.91 m)	165 lb (75 kg)	
Quinn Corna*; SG	Recruit ratings: Scout: Rivals: 247Sports: (NR)				
Overall recruit ranking:
Note: In many cases, Scout, Rivals, 247Sports, On3, and ESPN may conflict in their listings of height and weight.; In these cases, the average was taken. ESPN grades are on a 100-point scale.; Sources: "2022 Team Ranking". Rivals.

*Walk-on

== Preseason ==
On October 26, 2022 the MAC released the preseason coaches poll. Ohio was picked to finish fifth in the MAC regular season. Ohio had no members on the preseason all-MAC teams

=== Preseason rankings ===
MAC preseason poll
Predicted finish	Team	Votes (1st place)
1	Kent State	135 (6)
2	Toledo	131 (4)
3	Akron	127 (2)
4	Ball State	94
5	Ohio	91
6	Buffalo	82
7	Eastern Michigan	68
8	Western Michigan	66
9	Bowling Green	42
10	Central Michigan	38
11	Miami	36
12	Northern Illinois	26

MAC Tournament Champions: Kent State (4), Toledo (4), Akron (2), Eastern Michigan (1), Western Michigan (1)

== Roster ==
2022–23 Ohio Bobcats men's basketball team
Players
Coaches

Pos.	#	Name	Height	Weight	Year	Previous school	Hometown
G	0	Ajay Sheldon	6 ft 1 in (1.85 m)	185 lb (84 kg)	Fr	Dublin Coffman	Dublin, Ohio
G	1	Elmore James	6 ft 3 in (1.91 m)	205 lb (93 kg)	Fr	Brush	Cleveland, Ohio
G	2	Miles Brown	6 ft 1 in (1.85 m)	180 lb (82 kg)	Sr	Northstar Christian	Rochester, New York
F	3	Ben Roderick	6 ft 5 in (1.96 m)	205 lb (93 kg)	Sr	Olentangy Liberty	Powell, Ohio
F	4	Dwight Wilson III	6 ft 8 in (2.03 m)	250 lb (113 kg)	GS	Lincoln	Tallahassee, Florida
G	5	Olumide Adelodun	6 ft 6 in (1.98 m)	215 lb (98 kg)	So	Canada Topflight Academy West	Calgary, Alberta
F	10	Aiden Hadaway	6 ft 8 in (2.03 m)	190 lb (86 kg)	Fr	Lafayette	Lafayette, Georgia
C	11	Gabe Wizintzer	6 ft 11 in (2.11 m)	240 lb (109 kg)	Jr	Hargrave Military Academy	Walhalla, South Carolina
G	12	Jaylin Hunter	6 ft 0 in (1.83 m)	195 lb (88 kg)	Sr	East Catholic	Manchester, Connecticut
G	14	Ben Estis (W) (redshirt)	6 ft 1 in (1.85 m)	170 lb (77 kg)	Fr	Southlake Carroll	Southlake, Texas
G	15	Quinn Corna (W)	6 ft 3 in (1.91 m)	170 lb (77 kg)	Fr	Upper Arlington	Columbus, Ohio
F	21	IJ Ezuma (redshirt)	6 ft 8 in (2.03 m)	240 lb (109 kg)	So	Hargrave Military Academy	Raleigh, North Carolina
G	22	Devon Baker	6 ft 2 in (1.88 m)	190 lb (86 kg)	Sr	Spire Academy	Dayton, Ohio
F	23	AJ Clayton	6 ft 8 in (2.03 m)	225 lb (102 kg)	So	Philo	Roseville, Ohio
G	24	AJ Brown	6 ft 4 in (1.93 m)	195 lb (88 kg)	Fr	Orlando Christian Prep	Orlando, Florida

Head coach

- Jeff Boals (Ohio)

Assistant coach(es)

- Lamar Thornton (Ohio Dominican)
- Kyle Barlow (Concordia–Ann Arbor)
- Lee Martin (Catawba)

Legend

- (C) Team captain
- (S) Suspended
- (I) Ineligible
- (W) Walk-on
- Injured
- Current redshirt

Roster
Last update: September 13, 2022

=== Support Staff ===
2022-23 Ohio Bobcats Support Staff
- Jake Ness - Director of Basketball Operations
- Mike Cifliku - Video Coordinator
- Casey Crawford - Graduate Assistant
- Sara Legarsky - Senior Director of Athletics Communications (Men's Basketball, Field Hockey, Swimming and Diving, Softball)
- Tyler Congrove - Associate Athletic Trainer (Men's Basketball, Soccer, Men's Golf, Women's Golf)
- Jessica Arquette - Ohio Athletics Sports Dietitian
- Kaitlyn Michener - Nutritionist
- Hannah Rastatter - Nutritionist

== Schedule and results ==
Date time, TV	Rank^{#}	Opponent^{#}	Result	Record	High points	High rebounds	High assists	Site (attendance) city, state
Exhibition
August 5, 2022*		at Spain Select Team	L 68–75	–	–	–	–	Pabellón Deportivo Joan Deportivo; Barcelona, Spain
August 8, 2022*		at Spain Select Team	L 86–92	–	–	–	–	Canal de Isabel II; Madrid, Spain
August 9, 2022*		at Spain Select Team	L 77–84	–	–	–	–	Canal de Isabel II; Madrid, Spain
November 3, 2022*; 7:00 p.m., TBA		Capital	W 79–62	–	15 – Hunter	10 – Wilson	4 – Wilson	Convocation Center (3,895); Athens, OH
Non-conference regular season
November 7, 2022*; 6:30 p.m., ESPN+		at Belmont	L 69–70	0–1	20 – Wilson	9 – Clayton	3 – Baker	Curb Event Center (2,220); Nashville, TN
November 12, 2022*; 1:00 p.m., ESPN3		Cleveland State	W 81–70	1–1	17 – Hunter	14 – Wilson	7 – Hunter	Convocation Center (5,626); Athens, OH
November 16, 2022*; 7:00, ESPN+		at Detroit Mercy	L 74–88	1–2	16 – Baker	13 – Wilson	4 – Hunter	Calihan Hall (1,587); Detroit, MI
November 20, 2022*; 7:30 p.m., BTN		at No. 20 Michigan	L 66–70 ^{OT}	1–3	21 – Wilson	9 – Tied	5 – Hunter	Crisler Center (12,068); Ann Arbor, MI
November 25, 2022*; 2:00 p.m., ESPN3		Eastern Illinois; Bobcat Battle	W 78–67	2–3	15 – Roderick	8 – Wilson	7 – Hunter	Convocation Center (3,982); Athens, OH
November 27, 2022*; 2:00 p.m., ESPN+		Alabama State; Bobcat Battle	W 72–58	3–3	18 – M. Brown	11 – Clayton	7 – Hunter	Convocation Center (2,729); Athens, OH
November 30, 2022; 7:00 p.m., ESPN+		UC Clermont	W 113–44	4–3	18 – A. Brown	12 – Wilson	4 – A. Brown	Convocation Center (3,936); Athens, OH
December 3, 2022*; 5:00 p.m., ESPN+		at Marshall	L 69–83	4–4	16 – Wilson	6 – Tied	3 – Tied	Henderson Center (5,180); Huntington, WV
December 11, 2022*; 2:00 p.m., ESPN+		at Youngstown State	W 81–79	5–4	17 – Hunter	10 – Tied	7 – Hunter	Beeghly Center (1,691); Youngstown, OH
December 14, 2022*; 7:00 p.m., ESPN2		vs. Florida	L 48–82	5–5	14 – A. Brown	5 – Wilson	3 – Hunter	Amalie Arena (5,023); Tampa, FL
December 17, 2022*; 2:00 p.m., ESPN3		Stetson	W 85–66	6–5	20 – Wilson	9 – Wiznitzer	7 – Hunter	Convocation Center (3,051); Athens, OH
December 21, 2022*; 7:00 p.m., FLOHoops		at Delaware	W 95–76	7–5	23 – Clayton	13 – Wilson	3 – Tied	Bob Carpenter Center (1,568); Newark, DE
December 30, 2022*; 7:00 p.m., ESPN3		Chicago State	W 76–59	8–5	13 – Tied	10 – Wilson	6 – Hunter	Convocation Center (3,003); Athens, OH
MAC regular season
January 3, 2023; TBA, ESPN+		at Buffalo	L 72–75	8–6 (0–1)	24 – M. Brown	10 – Wilson	2 – Hunter	Alumni Arena (1,621); Buffalo, NY
January 7, 2023; 5:00 p.m., ESPN3		at Bowling Green	L 79–88	8–7 (0–2)	17 – Tied	17 – Wilson	3 – Tied	Stroh Center (1,932); Bowling Green, OH
January 10, 2023; 7:00 p.n., ESPN+		Ball State	W 76–71	9–7 (1–2)	23 – Hunter	10 – Wilson	4 – Tied	Convocation Center (4,010); Athens, OH
January 13, 2023; 6:30 p.m., CBSSN		Kent State	L 65–70	9–8 (1–3)	27 – Wilson	9 – Wilson	5 – Hunter	Convocation Center (4,713); Athens, OH
January 17, 2023; 7:00 p.m., ESPN+		at Toledo	L 75–90	9–9 (1–4)	21 – James	11 – Wilson	4 – Hunter	Savage Arena (4,829); Toledo, OH
January 21, 2023; 2:00 p.m., ESPN3		Central Michigan	W 96–68	10–9 (2–4)	27 – M. Brown	8 – Wilson	3 – M. Brown	Convocation Center (5,904); Athens, OH
January 24, 2023; 7:00 p.m., ESPN+		Western Michigan	W 88–76	11–9 (3–4)	31 – Wilson	11 – Wilson	6 – Hunter	Convocation Center (4,703); Athens, OH
January 28, 2023; 2:00 p.m., ESPN3		at Akron	L 77–83	11–10 (3–5)	16 – Hunter	5 – A. Brown	15 – Hunter	James A. Rhodes Arena (2,234); Akron, OH
January 31, 2023; 7:00 p.m., ESPN+		at Eastern Michigan	L 79–90	11–11 (3–6)	23 – Wilson	12 – Wilson	3 – Hunter	George Gervin GameAbove Center (2,472); Ypsilanti, MI
February 4, 2023; 2:00 p.m., ESPN3		Miami (OH)	W 78–68	12–11 (4–6)	23 – Hunter	9 – Wilson	4 – Hunter	Convocation Center (8,322); Athens, OH
February 7, 2023; 7:00 p.m., ESPN+		at Northern Illinois	W 82–76	13–11 (5–6)	19 – Hunter	8 – Wilson	5 – Hunter	Convocation Center (902); DeKalb, IL
February 10, 2023; 7:30 p.m., CBSSN		Akron	W 90–81	14–11 (6–6)	25 – Hunter	8 – Wilson	3 – Tied	Convocation Center (5,038); Athens, OH
February 14, 2023; 7:00 p.m., ESPN+		Buffalo	W 85–61	15–11 (7–6)	15 – Tied	8 – Wilson	4 – Hunter	Convocation Center (4,455); Athens, OH
February 18, 2023; 2:00 p.m., ESPN3		at Central Michigan	W 76–59	16–11 (8–6)	18 – Clayton	5 – M. Brown	6 – Hunter	McGuirk Arena (1,944); Mount Pleasant, MI
February 21, 2023; 7:00 p.m., ESPN+		Northern Illinois	W 77–68	17–11 (9–6)	24 – Wilson	10 – Wilson	7 – Hunter	Convocation Center (4,799); Athens, OH
February 25, 2023; 1:00 p.m., ESPN3		at Miami	L 68–85	17–12 (9–7)	19 – Tied	8 – Wilson	3 – Hunter	Millett Hall (2,852); Oxford, OH
February 28, 2023; 7:00 p.m., ESPN+		at Kent State	L 75–82	17–13 (9–8)	14 – Hunter	8 – Wilson	2 – Tied	MAC Center (1,998); Kent, OH
March 3, 2023; 8:00 p.m., CBSSN		Bowling Green	W 92–58	18–13 (10–8)	20 – Wilson III	7 – Wilson III	5 – Tied	Convocation Center (7,053); Athens, OH
MAC tournament
March 9, 2023; 1:30 p.m., ESPN+	(5)	vs. (4) Ball State; Quarterfinals	W 90–70	19–13	28 – A. Brown	10 – Wilson	4 – Hunter	Rocket Mortgage FieldHouse (3,852); Cleveland, OH
March 10, 2023; 5:00 p.m., CBSSN	(5)	vs. (1) Toledo; Semifinals	L 75–82	19–14	27 – Hunter	11 – Wilson	2 – Tied	Rocket Mortgage FieldHouse (9,295); Cleveland, OH
*Non-conference game. ^{#}Rankings from AP Poll. (#) Tournament seedings in parentheses. All times are in Eastern Time.

== Statistics ==
=== Team statistics ===
Final 2022–23 statistics

Record	Ohio	OPP
Scoring	2527	2331
Scoring Average	78.97	72.84
Field goals – Att	918–1993	831–1876
3-pt. Field goals – Att	285–761	247–727
Free throws – Att	406–557	422–624
Rebounds	1196	1106
Assists	406	395
Turnovers	353	398
Steals	213	186
Blocked Shots	71	102

=== Player statistics ===
			Minutes		Scoring		Total FGs			3-point FGs			Free-Throws			Rebounds								
Player	GP	GS	Tot	Avg	Pts	Avg	FG	FGA	Pct	3FG	3FA	Pct	FT	FTA	Pct	Off	Def	Tot	Avg	A	PF	TO	Stl	Blk
Dwight Wilson	31	31	781	25.2	487	15.7	201	324	0.620	0	0	0.000	85	119	0.714	111	173	284	9.2	39	62	47	12	6
Jaylin Hunter	32	31	933	29.2	407	12.7	141	322	0.438	66	168	0.393	59	79	0.747	26	88	114	3.6	136	66	65	55	6
Miles Brown	32	32	941	29.4	327	10.2	105	235	0.447	55	121	0.455	62	85	0.729	19	80	99	3.1	62	62	52	40	7
AJ Clayton	32	16	629	19.7	257	8.0	89	201	0.443	44	132	0.333	35	39	0.897	55	95	150	4.7	18	53	32	10	20
AJ Brown	25	8	509	20.4	255	10.2	88	205	0.429	38	100	0.380	41	53	0.774	19	39	58	2.3	20	39	15	19	6
Elmore James	30	14	466	15.5	206	6.9	76	149	0.510	17	40	0.425	37	47	0.787	17	38	55	1.8	12	35	23	11	4
Devon Baker	32	10	610	19.1	205	6.4	81	220	0.368	18	63	0.286	25	34	0.735	14	55	69	2.2	44	45	20	20	2
Ben Roderick	32	16	627	19.6	168	5.3	53	140	0.379	34	84	0.405	28	41	0.683	26	67	93	2.9	21	76	19	15	5
Gabe Wiznitzer	31	1	417	13.5	106	3.4	42	81	0.519	0	1	0.000	22	31	0.710	33	70	103	3.3	14	75	44	5	7
Aidan Hadaway	22	0	152	6.9	46	2.1	18	44	0.409	2	13	0.154	8	14	0.571	9	20	29	1.3	2	15	10	3	5
Ajay Sheldon	29	1	240	8.3	34	1.2	13	37	0.351	7	23	0.304	1	7	0.143	5	12	17	0.6	28	31	12	13	2
Olumide Adelodun	19	0	104	5.5	19	1.0	7	28	0.250	3	13	0.231	2	6	0.333	4	15	19	1.0	7	7	4	8	1
Quinn Corna	7	0	16	2.3	10	1.4	4	7	0.571	1	3	0.333	1	2	0.500	0	2	2	0.3	3	0	0	2	0
Total	32	-	6425	-	2527	79.0	918	1993	0.461	285	761	0.375	406	557	0.729	379	817	1196	37.4	406	566	353	213	71
Opponents	32	-	6425	-	2331	72.8	831	1876	0.443	247	727	0.340	422	624	0.676	330	776	1106	34.6	395	521	398	186	102

Legend
GP	Games played	GS	Games started	Avg	Average per game
FG	Field-goals made	FGA	Field-goal attempts	Off	Offensive rebounds
Def	Defensive rebounds	A	Assists	TO	Turnovers
Blk	Blocks	Stl	Steals	High	Team high

=== Team and individual highs ===
==== Team Game Highs ====
Team Game Highs
Stat	High	Opponent	Date
Points	113	UC-Clermont	November 30, 2022
Field goals made	45	UC-Clermont	November 30, 2022
Field Goal Attempts	77	Michigan	November 20, 2022
3 Points Made	15	Central Michigan	January 21, 2023
3 Points Attempted	32	Bowling Green	March 3, 2023
Free throws Made	22	Miami (OH)	February 4, 2023
Free Throw Attempts	25	Buffalo \ Miami (OH) \ Chicago St.	February 14, 2023 \ February 4, 2023 \ December 30, 2023
Rebounds	53	UC-Clermont	November 30, 2022
Assists	26	UC-Clermont	November 30, 2022
Steals	12	Central Michigan	January 21, 2023
Blocked Shots	8	UC-Clermont	November 30, 2022
Turnovers	17	Northern Illinois \ Toledo	February 7, 2023 \ March 10, 2023
Fouls	23	Central Michigan	January 21, 2023

==== Individual Game Highs ====
Individual Game Highs
Stat	High	Player	Opponent	Date
Points	31	Dwight Wilson III	Western Michigan	January 24, 2023
Field goals made	13	Dwight Wilson III	Western Michigan	January 24, 2023
Field Goal Attempts	19	Dwight Wilson III	Michigan \ Northern Illinois	November 20, 2022 \ February 21, 2023
3 Points Made	7	Jaylin Hunter	Toledo	March 10, 2023
3 Points Attempted	11	Jaylin Hunter	Toledo	March 10, 2023
Free throws Made	9	Dwight Wilson III	Kent State	January 13, 2023
Free Throw Attempts	10	Dwight Wilson III	Kent State	January 13, 2023
Rebounds	17	Dwight Wilson III	Bowling Green	January 7, 2023
Assists	7	Jaylin Hunter	6 times	6 times
Steals	6	Jaylin Hunter	Central Michigan	February 18, 2023
Blocked Shots	3	AJ Clayton \ Aiden Hadaway	2 times \ 1 time	3 times
Turnovers	5	Miles Brown \ Jaylin Hunter \ Dwight Wilson III	Northern Illinois \ Stetson \ Toledo	February 7, 2023 \ December 17, 2022 \ March 10, 2023
Fouls	5	Various		

== Awards and honors ==
=== Weekly Awards ===
Weekly Award Honors
Honors	Player	Position	Date Awarded	Source
MAC player of the week	Miles Brown	G	November 28	
MAC player of the week	Jaylin Hunter	G	February 13	

=== All-MAC Awards ===
Postseason All-MAC teams
Team	Player	Position	Year
All-MAC 2nd Team	Dwight Wilson III	F	Grad.
All-MAC Honorable Mention	Jaylin Hunter	G	Jr.
All-MAC Freshman Team	AJ Brown	G	Fr.
All-MAC Freshman Team	Elmore James	G	Fr.
