= 2022–23 Akron Zips men's basketball team =

American college basketball season

2022–23 Akron Zips men's basketball
- Conference: Mid-American Conference
- Record: 22–11 (13–5 MAC)
- Head coach: John Groce (6th season)
- Associate head coach: Dustin Ford (6th season)
- Assistant coaches: Rob Fulford (6th season); Robby Pridgen (6th season)
- Home arena: James A. Rhodes Arena

2022–23 Mid-American Conference men's basketball standings
	Conf.				Overall
Team	W		L	PCT	W		L	PCT
Toledo	16	–	2	.889	27	–	8	.771
Kent State †	15	–	3	.833	28	–	7	.800
Akron	13	–	5	.722	22	–	11	.667
Ball State	11	–	7	.611	20	–	12	.625
Ohio	10	–	8	.556	19	–	14	.576
Buffalo	9	–	9	.500	15	–	17	.469
Northern Illinois	9	–	9	.500	13	–	19	.406
Miami (OH)	6	–	12	.333	12	–	20	.375
Bowling Green	5	–	13	.278	11	–	20	.355
Eastern Michigan	5	–	13	.278	8	–	23	.258
Central Michigan	5	–	13	.278	10	–	21	.323
Western Michigan	4	–	14	.222	8	–	23	.258
† 2023 MAC tournament winner

The 2022–23 Akron Zips men's basketball team represented the University of Akron during the 2022–23 NCAA Division I men's basketball season. The Zips, led by sixth-year head coach John Groce, played their home games at the James A. Rhodes Arena in Akron, Ohio as members of the Mid-American Conference. As the third seed they defeated Buffalo in the first round of the MAC tournament before losing to Kent State to finish 22–11 and 13–5 in MAC play

== Previous season ==
The Zips finished the 2022–23 season 24–10 overall, 14–6 in MAC Play to finish in a tie for third place. As the No. 4 seed, they defeated Buffalo, Toledo, and Kent State to win the MAC tournament. They received the conference’s automatic bid to the NCAA tournament as the No. 13 seed in the East Region, where they lost in the first round to UCLA.

== Offseason ==
=== Departures ===
Departures
Name	Pos.	Height	Weight	Year	Hometown	Notes
Ali Ali	F	6'8	205	Sophomore	Kendallville, Indiana	Transferred to Butler
Aziz Bandaogo	C	7'0	215	Freshman	Dakar, Senegal	Transferred to Utah Valley
Sekou Kalle	F	6'10	224	Freshman	Louisville, Kentucky	Transferred to Evansville
Bryan Trimble, Jr.	G	6'3	224	RS-Junior	Kansas City, Missouri	Transferred to Missouri State
Michael Wynn	F	6'6	210	Junior	Albany, New York	Entered Transfer Portal

=== Incoming transfers ===
Transfers
Name	Pos.	Height	Weight	Year	Hometown	Previous school
Trendon Hankerson	G	6'2	185	Junior	Novi, Michigan	Transferred from Northern Illinois
Sammy Hunter	F	6'9	228	Sophomore	Nassau, Bahamas	Transferred from Mississippi

=== Recruiting class ===
College recruiting information
Name	Hometown	School	Height	Weight	Commit date
Amani Lyles; F	Columbus, Ohio	Beechcroft	6 ft 7 in (2.01 m)	226 lb (103 kg)	
Amani Lyles; F	Recruit ratings: Scout: Rivals: 247Sports: (NR)				
Tavari Johnson; G	Chicago, Illinois	Lyons	5 ft 11 in (1.80 m)	155 lb (70 kg)	
Tavari Johnson; G	Recruit ratings: Scout: Rivals: 247Sports: (NR)				
Ryan Prather Jr. G	Clarksburg, Maryland	Clarksburg	6 ft 5 in (1.96 m)	205 lb (93 kg)	Nov 15, 2021
Ryan Prather Jr. G	Recruit ratings: Scout: Rivals: 247Sports: (NR)				
Prince Mosengo; F	Democratic Republic of the Congo	Keystone Academy	6 ft 8 in (2.03 m)	205 lb (93 kg)	
Prince Mosengo; F	Recruit ratings: Scout: Rivals: 247Sports: (NR)				
Overall recruit ranking:
Note: In many cases, Scout, Rivals, 247Sports, On3, and ESPN may conflict in their listings of height and weight.; In these cases, the average was taken. ESPN grades are on a 100-point scale.; Sources: "2022 Team Ranking". Rivals.

== Roster ==
2022–23 Akron Zips men's basketball team
Players
Coaches

Pos.	#	Name	Height	Weight	Year	Previous school	Hometown
F	0	Amani Lyles	6 ft 7 in (2.01 m)	226 lb (103 kg)	Fr	Beechcroft	Columbus, OH
G	1	Garvin Clarke	6 ft 0 in (1.83 m)	184 lb (83 kg)	So	Cleveland Heights HS	Euclid, OH
G	2	Greg Tribble	6 ft 1 in (1.85 m)	195 lb (88 kg)	Jr	Huntington Prep	Cincinnati, OH
G	3	Kobe Mitchell	6 ft 2 in (1.88 m)	190 lb (86 kg)	So	Harrison Central HS	Cadiz, OH
G	4	Trendon Hankerson	6 ft 2 in (1.88 m)	185 lb (84 kg)	GS	Northern Illinois	Novi, MI
G	5	Tavari Johnson	5 ft 11 in (1.8 m)	155 lb (70 kg)	Fr	Lyons	Chicago, IL
G	10	Ryan Prather Jr.	6 ft 5 in (1.96 m)	205 lb (93 kg)	Fr	Clarksburg	Clarksburg, MD
G	11	Sammy Hunter	6 ft 9 in (2.06 m)	225 lb (102 kg)	Jr	Mississippi	Nassau, Bahamas
G	12	Pat Mayfield	6 ft 5 in (1.96 m)	185 lb (84 kg)	So	Burlington Central HS	Elgin, IL
G	13	Xavier Castaneda	6 ft 1 in (1.85 m)	188 lb (85 kg)	Sr	South Florida	Chicago, IL
G	20	Evan Wilson	6 ft 2 in (1.88 m)	200 lb (91 kg)	So	Noblesville HS	Noblesville, IN
G/F	22	Mikal Dawson	6 ft 5 in (1.96 m)	222 lb (101 kg)	Jr	Huntington Prep	Huntington, WV
F	23	Prince Mosengo	6 ft 8 in (2.03 m)	205 lb (93 kg)	Fr	Keystone Academy	DR Congo
F	25	Enrique Freeman	6 ft 7 in (2.01 m)	206 lb (93 kg)	Jr	St. Martin de Porres HS	Cleveland, OH
G	34	Nate Johnson	6 ft 3 in (1.91 m)	204 lb (93 kg)	So	Lakota East HS	Liberty Township, OH

Head coach

- John Groce (Taylor)

Assistant coach(es)

- Dustin Ford (Ohio)
- Rob Fulford (Marshall)
- Robby Pridgen (Roanoke)

Legend

- (C) Team captain
- (S) Suspended
- (I) Ineligible
- (W) Walk-on
- Injured
- Current redshirt

Roster
Last update: September 13, 2022

== Schedule and results ==
Date time, TV	Rank^{#}	Opponent^{#}	Result	Record	High points	High rebounds	High assists	Site (attendance) city, state
Non-conference regular season
November 7, 2022*; 7:00 p.m., ESPN3		South Dakota State	W 81–80 ^{OT}	1–0	31 – Castaneda	14 – Freeman	7 – Castaneda	James A. Rhodes Arena (2,157); Akron, OH
November 11, 2022*; 7:00 p.m., Barstool Sports		vs. Mississippi State; Barstool Showcase	L 54–73	1–1	20 – Castaneda	4 – Tied	6 – Castaneda	Wells Fargo Center (5,213); Philadelphia, PA
November 15, 2022*; 7:00 p.m., TBA		Morgan State	W 65–59	2–1	17 – Freeman	13 – Freeman	4 – Tribble	James A. Rhodes Arena (1,759); Akron, OH
November 21, 2022*; 1:30 p.m., FloSports		vs. Western Kentucky; Cayman Islands Classic quarterfinals	W 72–53	3–1	18 – Freeman	11 – Tied	3 – Tied	John Gray Gymnasium; George Town, Cayman Islands
November 22, 2022*; 1:30 p.m., FloSports		vs. LSU; Cayman Islands Classic semifinals	L 58–73	3–2	28 – Castaneda	10 – Freeman	4 – Castaneda	John Gray Gymnasium; George Town, Cayman Islands
November 23, 2022*; 5:00 p.m., FloSports		vs. Nevada; Cayman Islands Classic	L 58–62	3–3	21 – Johnson	9 – Freeman	4 – Johnson	John Gray Gymnasium; George Town, Cayman Islands
November 30, 2022*; 7:00 p.m., ESPN+		at Marshall	L 57–68	3–4	16 – Johnson	14 – Freeman	4 – Johnson	Cam Henderson Center (4.012); Huntington, WV
December 4, 2022*; 2:00 p.m., ESPN+		Muskingum	W 80–33	4–4	17 – Castaneda	9 – Lyles	6 – Johnson	James A. Rhodes Arena (1,466); Akron, OH
December 11, 2022*; 2:00 p.m., ESPN+		Jackson State	W 85–72	5–4	23 – Castaneda	9 – Freeman	5 – Tied	James A. Rhodes Arena (1,385); Akron, OH
December 14, 2022*; 7:00 p.m., ESPN+		Wright State	W 66–54	6–4	19 – Castaneda	15 – Freeman	4 – Hankerson	James A. Rhodes Arena (1398); Akron, OH
December 19, 2022*; 7:00 p.m., ESPN+		Maine	W 87–55	7–4	33 – Castaneda	8 – Freeman	3 – Castaneda	James A. Rhodes Arena (1,424); Akron, OH
December 22, 2022*; 5:00 p.m., ESPN+		at Bradley	L 55–74	7–5	19 – Castaneda	10 – Freeman	2 – Castaneda	Carver Arena (3,530); Peoria, IL
December 30, 2022*; 7:00 p.m., ESPN3		Concord	W 84–58	8–5	18 – Freeman	10 – Freeman	6 – Hankerson	James A. Rhodes Arena (1,550); Akron, OH
MAC regular season
January 3, 2023; 7:00 p.m., ESPN+		Northern Illinois	W 76–51	9–5 (1–0)	27 – Freeman	15 – Freeman	4 – Hankerson	James A. Rhodes Arena; Akron, OH
January 6, 2023; 8:30 p.m., CBSSN		at Ball State	L 63–70	9–6 (1–1)	23 – Freeman	14 – Freeman	1 – Tied	Worthen Arena; Muncie, IN
January 10, 2023; 7:00 p.m., ESPN+		at Bowling Green	W 74–70	10–6 (2–1)	21 – Freeman	15 – Freeman	5 – Castaneda	Stroh Center (1,844); Bowling Green, OH
January 13, 2023; 7:00 p.m., ESPNU		Eastern Michigan	W 104–67	11–6 (3–1)	23 – Castaneda	9 – Freeman	9 – Johnson	James A. Rhodes Arena (2,177); Akron, OH
January 17, 2023; 7:00 p.m., ESPN+		at Central Michigan	W 69–51	12–6 (4–1)	13 – Castaneda	9 – Freeman	5 – Castaneda	McGuirk Arena (1,509); Mount Pleasant, MI
January 21, 2023; 2:30 p.m., ESPN3		at Western Michigan	W 66–55	13–6 (5–1)	32 – Castaneda	11 – Freeman	4 – Tribble	University Arena (2,288); Kalamazoo, MI
January 24, 2023; 7:00 p.m., ESPN+		Miami (OH)	W 73–68	14–6 (6–1)	32 – Castaneda	8 – Freeman	4 – Tribble	James A. Rhodes Arena (1,620); Akron, OH
January 28, 2023; 2:00 p.m., ESPN3		Ohio	W 83–77	15–6 (7–1)	32 – Freeman	15 – Freeman	4 – Hankerson	James A. Rhodes Arena (2,234); Akron, OH
January 31, 2023; TBA, ESPN+		at Buffalo	W 81–64	16–6 (8–1)	32 – Castaneda	9 – Freeman	8 – Tribble	Alumni Arena (5,001); Buffalo, NY
February 3, 2023; 7:00 p.m., ESPN3		Kent State	W 67–55	17–6 (9–1)	24 – Castaneda	17 – Freeman	4 – Tribble	James A. Rhodes Arena (5,821); Akron, OH
February 7, 2023; 7:00 p.m., ESPN+		Toledo	L 74–84	17–7 (9–2)	23 – Castaneda	12 – Freeman	4 – Tribble	James A. Rhodes Arena (2,041); Akron, OH
February 10, 2023; 7:30 p.m., CBSSN		at Ohio	L 81–90	17–8 (9–3)	34 – Castaneda	12 – Freeman	4 – Hankerson	Convocation Center (5,038); Athens, OH
February 14, 2023; 7:00 p.m., ESPN+		at Eastern Michigan	W 78–51	18–8 (10–3)	22 – Freeman	15 – Freeman	4 – Castaneda	George Gervin GameAbove Center (2,122); Ypsilanti, MI
February 18, 2023; 7:00 p.m., ESPN3		Buffalo	W 86–66	19–8 (11–3)	30 – Castaneda	10 – Freeman	4 – Freeman	James A. Rhodes Arena (2,068); Akron, OH
February 21, 2023; 7:00 p.m., ESPN+		at Toledo	L 63–84	19–9 (11–4)	18 – Freeman	9 – Freeman	4 – Castaneda	Savage Arena (5,677); Toledo, OH
February 25, 2023; 4:00 p.m., ESPN3		Western Michigan	W 81–64	20–9 (12–4)	23 – Castaneda	10 – Freeman	6 – Hankerson	James A. Rhodes Arena (1,739); Akron, OH
February 28, 2023; 7:00 p.m., ESPN+		Ball State	W 87–83	21–9 (13–4)	29 – Castaneda	12 – Freeman	3 – Hankerson	James A. Rhodes Arena (1,912); Akron, OH
March 3, 2023; 6:00 p.m., ESPNU		at Kent State	L 84–89 ^{OT}	21–10 (13–5)	26 – Hunter	12 – Freeman	5 – Castaneda	MAC Center (6,327); Kent, OH
MAC tournament
March 9, 2023; 6:30 p.m., ESPN+	(3)	vs. (6) Buffalo; Quarterfinals	W 101–77	22–10	31 – Castaneda	7 – Freeman	4 – Castaneda	Rocket Mortgage FieldHouse (3,852); Cleveland, OH
March 10, 2023; 7:30 p.m., CBSSN	(3)	vs. (2) Kent State; Semifinals	L 73–79	22–11	26 – Freeman	18 – Freeman	3 – Tied	Rocket Mortgage FieldHouse (9,295); Cleveland, OH
*Non-conference game. ^{#}Rankings from AP Poll. (#) Tournament seedings in parentheses. All times are in Eastern Time.
