= 2022–23 Michigan Wolverines men's basketball team =

American college basketball season

2022–23 Michigan Wolverines men's basketball

NIT, Second Round
- Conference: Big Ten Conference
- Record: 18–16 (11–9 Big Ten)
- Head coach: Juwan Howard (4th season)
- Assistant coaches: Saddi Washington (7th season); Phil Martelli (4th season); Howard Eisley (4th season)
- Captains: Hunter Dickinson; Terrence Williams III; Jace Howard
- Home arena: Crisler Center

2022–23 Big Ten Conference men's basketball standings
	Conf.				Overall
Team	W		L	PCT	W		L	PCT
No. 3 Purdue †	15	–	5	.750	29	–	6	.829
No. 21 Indiana	12	–	8	.600	23	–	12	.657
Northwestern	12	–	8	.600	22	–	12	.647
Michigan State	11	–	8	.579	21	–	13	.618
Maryland	11	–	9	.550	22	–	13	.629
Illinois	11	–	9	.550	20	–	13	.606
Iowa	11	–	9	.550	19	–	14	.576
Michigan	11	–	9	.550	18	–	16	.529
Penn State	10	–	10	.500	23	–	14	.622
Rutgers	10	–	10	.500	19	–	15	.559
Wisconsin	9	–	11	.450	20	–	15	.571
Nebraska	9	–	11	.450	16	–	16	.500
Ohio State	5	–	15	.250	16	–	19	.457
Minnesota	2	–	17	.105	9	–	22	.290
† Conference tournament winner Rankings from AP poll

The 2022–23 Michigan Wolverines men's basketball team represented the University of Michigan during the 2022–23 NCAA Division I men's basketball season. The season marked the program's 107th season and its 106th consecutive year as a member of the Big Ten Conference. The Wolverines were led by fourth-year head coach Juwan Howard, and played their home games for the 56th consecutive year at Crisler Center in Ann Arbor, Michigan.

== Previous season ==
The Wolverines finished the 2021–22 season 19–15, 11–9 in Big Ten play to finish in a tie for seventh place. As the No. 8 seed in the Big Ten tournament, they lost to Indiana in the second round. The Wolverines received an at-large bid to the NCAA tournament as the No. 11 seed in the South region, where they defeated Colorado State, and Tennessee to advance to their fifth straight Sweet Sixteen. In the Sweet Sixteen, they lost to Villanova.

== Offseason ==
=== Departures ===
Michigan Departures
Name	Number	Pos.	Height	Weight	Year	Hometown	Reason for departure
Eli Brooks	55	G	6'1"	175	GS	Spring Grove, PA	Graduated
DeVante' Jones	12	G	6'0"	200	GS	New Orleans, LA	Declared for NBA draft
Brandon Johns Jr	23	F	6'8"	240	Sr	East Lansing, MI	Transferred to VCU
Adrien Nunez	0	G	6'6"	220	Sr	Brooklyn, NY	Graduated
Jaron Faulds	44	F	6'10"	240	Sr	Holt, MI	Graduated
Brandon Wade	4	G	6'1"	190	Sr	Ann Arbor, MI	Graduated
Frankie Collins	10	G	6'1"	195	Fr	Henderson, NV	Transferred to Arizona State
Moussa Diabaté	14	F	6'11"	210	Fr	Paris, France	Declared for NBA Draft
Caleb Houstan	22	F	6'8"	205	Fr	Mississauga, Ontario	Declared for NBA Draft
Zeb Jackson	3	G	6’5”	180	So	Toledo, OH	Transferred to VCU

=== Acquisitions ===
==== Incoming transfers ====
Michigan incoming transfers
Name	Number	Pos.	Height	Weight	Year	Hometown	Previous School
Joey Baker	15	SF	6'7"	205	GS	Fayetteville, North Carolina	Duke
Jaelin Llewellyn	3	PG	6'2"	190	GS	Mono, Ontario	Princeton

=== Recruiting classes ===
On Jun 17, 2021, Michigan received its first class of 2022 commitment from four-star point guard Dug McDaniel. On August 5, Michigan received its second commitment of the 2022 class, four-star center Tarris Reed. On October 5, Michigan received its third commitment of the 2022 class, four-star power forward Gregg Glenn III. On October 13, Michigan received its fourth commitment of the 2022 class, four-star small forward Jett Howard. At that time, Michigan's recruiting class was ranked the best in the Big Ten, and sixth in the country, according to 247Sports.

==== 2022 recruiting class ====
College recruiting information
Name	Hometown	School	Height	Weight	Commit date
Tarris Reed; C	Branson, Missouri	Link Year Prep	6 ft 9 in (2.06 m)	230 lb (100 kg)	Aug 5, 2021
Tarris Reed; C	Recruit ratings: Rivals: 247Sports: ESPN: (88)				
Jett Howard; SF	Bradenton, Florida	IMG Academy	6 ft 7 in (2.01 m)	220 lb (100 kg)	Oct 13, 2021
Jett Howard; SF	Recruit ratings: Rivals: 247Sports: ESPN: (87)				
Dug McDaniel; PG	Fairfax, Virginia	Paul VI Catholic	5 ft 10 in (1.78 m)	155 lb (70 kg)	Jun 17, 2021
Dug McDaniel; PG	Recruit ratings: Rivals: 247Sports: ESPN: (84)				
Gregg Glenn III; PF	Fort Lauderdale, Florida	Calvary Christian Academy	6 ft 7 in (2.01 m)	215 lb (98 kg)	Oct 5, 2021
Gregg Glenn III; PF	Recruit ratings: Rivals: 247Sports: ESPN: (82)				
Youssef Khayat; SF	Beirut, Lebanon	Limoges CSP	6 ft 8 in (2.03 m)	190 lb (86 kg)	Jun 26, 2022
Youssef Khayat; SF	Recruit ratings: No ratings found				
Overall recruit ranking: Rivals: 12 247Sports: 11
Note: In many cases, Scout, Rivals, 247Sports, On3, and ESPN may conflict in their listings of height and weight.; In these cases, the average was taken. ESPN grades are on a 100-point scale.; Sources: "Michigan 2022 Basketball Commitments". Rivals.; "2022 Michigan Wolverines Recruiting Class". ESPN.; "2022 Team Ranking". Rivals.

==== 2023 recruiting class ====
College recruiting information (2023)
Name	Hometown	School	Height	Weight	Commit date
Papa Kante; C	South Kent, CT	South Kent	6 ft 10 in (2.08 m)	215 lb (98 kg)	Oct 20, 2022
Papa Kante; C	Recruit ratings: Rivals: 247Sports: ESPN: (82)				
George Washington III; SG	Dayton, OH	Chaminade Julienne	6 ft 2 in (1.88 m)	175 lb (79 kg)	Nov 1, 2022
George Washington III; SG	Recruit ratings: Rivals: 247Sports: ESPN: (85)				
Overall recruit ranking: Rivals: 39 247Sports: 44
Note: In many cases, Scout, Rivals, 247Sports, On3, and ESPN may conflict in their listings of height and weight.; In these cases, the average was taken. ESPN grades are on a 100-point scale.; Sources: "Michigan 2023 Basketball Commitments". Rivals.; "2023 Michigan Wolverines Recruiting Class". ESPN.; "2023 Team Ranking". Rivals.

== Roster ==
2022–23 Michigan Wolverines men's basketball team
Players
Coaches

Pos.	#	Name	Height	Weight	Year	Previous school	Hometown
G	0	Dug McDaniel	5 ft 11 in (1.8 m)	160 lb (73 kg)	Fr	Paul VI Catholic High School	Fairfax, VA
C	1	Hunter Dickinson (C)	7 ft 1 in (2.16 m)	260 lb (118 kg)	Jr	DeMatha Catholic (MD)	Alexandria, VA
G	2	Kobe Bufkin	6 ft 4 in (1.93 m)	195 lb (88 kg)	So	Grand Rapids Christian	Grand Rapids, MI
G	3	Jaelin Llewellyn (injured)	6 ft 2 in (1.88 m)	190 lb (86 kg)	GS	Princeton	Mono, ON
G	4	Ian Burns (W)	6 ft 6 in (1.98 m)	205 lb (93 kg)	So	New Trier High School	Winnetka, IL
F	5	Terrance Williams II (C)	6 ft 7 in (2.01 m)	225 lb (102 kg)	Jr	Gonzaga College	Clinton, MD
G/F	11	Isaiah Barnes	6 ft 7 in (2.01 m)	200 lb (91 kg)	So	Simeon Career Academy	Chicago, IL
F	13	Jett Howard	6 ft 8 in (2.03 m)	215 lb (98 kg)	Fr	IMG Academy	Miami, FL
F	15	Joey Baker	6 ft 7 in (2.01 m)	205 lb (93 kg)	GS	Duke	Fayetteville, NC
F	23	Gregg Glenn	6 ft 7 in (2.01 m)	230 lb (104 kg)	Fr	Calvary Christian Academy	Fort Lauderdale, FL
F	24	Youssef Khayat	6 ft 9 in (2.06 m)	195 lb (88 kg)	Fr	Limoges CSP	Beirut, Lebanon
G	25	Jace Howard (C)	6 ft 7 in (2.01 m)	225 lb (102 kg)	Jr	NSU University School	Miami, FL
C	32	Tarris Reed	6 ft 10 in (2.08 m)	260 lb (118 kg)	Fr	Link Academy	Branson, MO
G/F	34	Jackson Selvala (W)	6 ft 7 in (2.01 m)	215 lb (98 kg)	Sr	Deerfield Academy	Deerfield, MA
F	42	Will Tschetter	6 ft 8 in (2.03 m)	240 lb (109 kg)	RS Fr	Stewartville	Stewartville, MN
G	45	Cooper Smith (W)	6 ft 1 in (1.85 m)	175 lb (79 kg)	So	Kalamazoo College	Kalamazoo, MI

Head coach

Juwan Howard (Michigan)

Assistant coach(es)

- Saddi Washington (Western Michigan)
- Phil Martelli (Widener)
- Howard Eisley (Boston College)

Legend

- (C) Team captain
- (S) Suspended
- (I) Ineligible
- (W) Walk-on
- Injured
- Current redshirt

Roster

== Regular season ==
=== November ===
Michigan began the season on November 7 with a 75–56 victory over Purdue Fort Wayne. Michigan was led by Hunter Dickinson with a game-high 22 points and 12 rebounds, for his 18th career double-double, while Jett Howard added 21 points. Dickinson reached 1,000 career points on a free throw with 3:43 remaining in the first half, becoming the 57th Wolverine to reach the milestone. On November 11, Michigan defeated Eastern Michigan 88–83. Michigan was led by Dickinson with a game-high 31 points, while Terrance Williams II added 18 points and a career-high 11 rebounds for his first career double-double. Dickinson tied a career-high with 13 field goals made on 17 attempts. On November 14, Dickinson and Howard were named the Big Ten Player of the Week and Big Ten Freshman of the Week, respectively. Dickinson averaged 26.5 points, 9.5 rebounds, and 1.5 blocked shots, while Howard averaged 15.0 points, 2.5 rebounds, 4.5 assists, 1.0 steals, and 1.5 blocked shots in Michigan's two victories last week. On November 16, Michigan defeated Pittsburgh 91–60 in the semifinals of the Legends Classic. Michigan was led by Howard with a game-high 17 points, while Kobe Bufkin and Joey Baker added 14 points each, and Dickinson added 11 points and seven rebounds. With seven rebounds, Dickinson became the 46th Wolverine to reach the 500 rebounds milestone. After reaching 1,000 points in the season-opener against Purdue Fort Wayne, he became the 31st member of Michigan's 1000 point/500 rebound club. The next day Michigan lost to Arizona State 87–62 in the Legends Classic championship game. Michigan was led by Dickinson with 14 points, while Howard added 12 points. On November 20, Michigan defeated Ohio 70–66 in overtime. Michigan was led by Dickinson with a game-high 24 points and 14 rebounds for his 19th career double-double, while Howard added 14 points and a career-high four blocks, and Jaelin Llewellyn added 10 points. On November 23, Michigan defeated Jackson State 78–68. Michigan was led by Howard with a game-high 19 points, while Williams added 11 points, Bufkin added 10 points and a career-high three blocks, and Dickinson added nine points and 12 rebounds, one-point shy of a double-double. Michigan's defense blocked 13 shots, tied for the second-most in a single game in program history. On November 29, Michigan lost to (No. 3 AP Poll/No. 3 Coaches Poll) Virginia 70–68 in the ACC–Big Ten Challenge. Michigan was led by Dickinson with a game-high 23 points, while Howard added 15 points and Bufkin added 11 points. This was Howard's fifth consecutive game scoring in double figures.

=== December ===
On December 4, Michigan lost to (No. 19 AP Poll/No. 18 Coaches Poll) Kentucky 73–69 in the Basketball Hall of Fame London Showcase. Michigan was led by Dickinson with a game-high 23 points, nine rebounds, and three blocks, while Howard added 16 points and Bufkin added 11 points. During the game Llewellyn suffered a season-ending ACL injury in his left knee. On December 8, Michigan defeated Minnesota 90–75 in its Big Ten Conference season opener. Michigan was led by Dickinson with a game-high 19 points, while Bufkin and Dug McDaniel added a career-high 15 points each, and Howard added 14 points. McDaniel made his first career start, replacing the injured Llewellyn. On December 17, Michigan defeated Lipscomb 83–75. Michigan was led by Bufkin with a career-high 22 points, while Howard added 19 points, Dickinson added 15 points, Williams II added 11 points, and McDaniel added seven points and a career-high eight rebounds. On December 21, Michigan lost to North Carolina 80–76 in the Jumpman Invitational. Michigan was led by Bufkin with 22 points, while Howard added 17 points, and Williams II added eight points and a career-high-tying 11 rebounds. On December 30, Michigan lost to Central Michigan 63–61 in their final non-conference game. Michigan was led by Bufkin with 16 points, while Dickinson added 13 points, Howard added 12 points, his tenth consecutive game scoring in double-figures, and McDaniel added 10 points. Baker appeared in his 100th career game after checking in off the bench in the first half. He appeared in 88 games with Duke before transferring to Michigan this season.

=== January ===
On January 1, Michigan defeated Maryland 81–46. Michigan was led by Dickinson with a season-high 32 points and 12 rebounds for his 20th career double-double, while Williams II added 11 points. Michigan's defense held Maryland to just 13 first-half points, which tied the program record for fewest first-half points allowed. The Wolverines's opened the game on a 17–0 scoring run, including shooting 7-for-7 from the field. On January 4, Michigan defeated Penn State 79–69. Michigan was led by Dickinson with 17 points, while Bufkin and Howard added 14 points each, and McDaniel added 12 points. On January 7, Michigan lost their rivalry game against Michigan State 59–53. Michigan was led by Dickinson with a game-high 18 points, while Bufkin added 15 points and three steals, and Howard added 10 points. On January 12, Michigan lost to Iowa 93–84 in overtime. Michigan was led by Howard with a career-high 34 points, behind seven three-pointers, while McDaniel added 12 points, seven assists and six rebounds, and Dickinson added 12 points and 13 rebounds for his 21st career double-double. Howard matched his career high in points (21), field goals made (8) and three-pointers made (5) in the first half alone. Howard's 34 points were the most by a Wolverine since Daniel Horton scored 34 in 2006. On January 15, Michigan defeated Northwestern 85–78. Michigan was led by Bufkin with 20 points, while McDaniel added a career-high 17 points, Howard added 16 points, and Dickinson added 10 points and a career-high tying 15 rebounds for his 22nd career double-double. With his double-double Dickinson passed Cazzie Russell for 17th all-time in Michigan program history. On January 19, Michigan lost to Maryland 64–58. Michigan was led by Dickinson with 19 points, and ten rebounds for his 23rd career double-double, while Howard added 13 points, and Williams II added nine points and a career-high 13 rebounds, one-point shy of a double-double. On January 22, Michigan defeated Minnesota 60–56. Michigan was led by Dickinson with a game-high 23 points, and nine rebounds, while Bufkin added 12 points, and McDaniel added ten points and a career-high tying eight rebounds. Jett Howard exited the game in the first half with a left ankle injury and did not return. On January 26, Michigan lost to (No. 1 AP Poll/No. 1 Coaches Poll) Purdue 75–70. Michigan was led by Dickinson with a game-high 21 points and seven rebounds, while Bufkin added 16 points and Baker added 11 points in his first start as a Wolverine, replacing the injured Howard. On January 29, Michigan lost to Penn State 83–61. Michigan was led by Jett Howard with 21 points, behind five three-pointers, while Bufkin added eight points and six rebounds and Jace Howard added a career-high six points.

=== February ===
On February 2, Michigan defeated Northwestern 68–51. Michigan was led by Dickinson with 19 points, while Bufkin added 15 points, a career-high 12 rebounds and eight assists, for his first career double-double, Baker added a season high 14 points, and McDaniel added a career-high nine assists. On February 5, Michigan won their rivalry game against Ohio State 77–69. Michigan was led by Dickinson with a game-high 26 points and 11 rebounds, for his 24th career double-double, while Howard added 16 points and Bufkin added 13 points, eight rebounds and five assists. With his double-double Dickinson tied Glen Rice for 12th most all-time in Michigan program history. On February 8, Michigan defeated Nebraska 93–72. Michigan was led by Howard with 22 points, while Dickinson added 16 points and 10 rebounds, for his 25th career double-double, McDaniel added 14 points and four assists, Bufkin added 13 points, seven rebounds and five assists, Baker added 11 points, and Williams II added 10 points and five rebounds. This marked the first time six Wolverines scored in double figures since December 6, 2019. With his double-double, Dickinson tied C. J. Kupec for 11th most all-time in Michigan program history. On February 11, Michigan lost to (No. 18 AP Poll/No. 18 Coaches Poll) Indiana 62–61. Michigan was led by Dickinson with 16 points, seven rebounds and three blocks, while Bufkin added 14 points, Howard added 12 points, and Tarris Reed Jr. added a career-high eight points and five rebounds. With three blocks, Dickinson became the third Wolverine to record 40 blocks in three consecutive seasons. Michigan was held scoreless during the final five minutes of the game, while neither team scored in the final three minutes of the game. On February 14, Michigan lost to Wisconsin 64–59. Michigan was led by Bufkin with 21 points, while Dickinson added 12 points and 12 rebounds, for his 26th career double-double. With his double-double, Dickinson tied Campy Russell for 10th most all-time in Michigan program history. Will Tschetter started his first career game, playing 26 minutes while recording four points and five rebounds. He replaced Williams II, who missed the game with a knee injury. On February 18, Michigan won their rivalry game against Michigan State 84–72, in Michigan State's first game since the Michigan State University shooting. Michigan was led by McDaniel with a career-high 18 points, while Bufkin added 17 points, Dickinson added 10 points and seven rebounds, Howard added 10 points, Baker added 10 points and Reed added eight points and a career-high 10 rebounds. Michigan ended the game on a 12–0 run, holding Michigan State scoreless for the final 2:29 of the game. On February 23, Michigan defeated Rutgers 58–45. Michigan was led by McDaniel with a game-high 16 points, and career-high five steals, while Bufkin added 14 points, and Dickinson added 13 points and 11 rebounds, for his 27th career double-double. McDaniel's five steals were the most for a Wolverine since Zavier Simpson also had five steals in a game against Villanova on November 14, 2018. On February 26, Michigan defeated Wisconsin 87–79 in overtime. Michigan was led by Bufkin with a career-high 28 points, while Dickinson added 23 points and 10 rebounds, for his 28th career double-double, and McDaniel added a career-high 20 points. With 1.8 seconds remaining in the game, Dickinson scored a buzzer-beating three-point shot to force overtime. Michigan outscored Wisconsin 19–11 in overtime.

=== March ===
On March 2, Michigan lost to Illinois 91–87 in double-overtime. Michigan was led by Dickinson with a game-high 31 points, and a career-high 16 rebounds, for his 29th double-double, while Bufkin added 23 points, and Howard added 15 points. This marked Michigan's first double-overtime game since 2020. With a three-pointer in the first quarter, Dickinson became the 22nd Wolverine to reach the 1,500 point milestone. With his 31 points, Dickinson surpassed current head coach Juwan Howard (1,526) for 20th on Michigan's all-time scoring list. On March 5, Michigan lost to (No. 15 AP Poll/No. 13 Coaches Poll) Indiana 75–73 in overtime. Michigan was led by Dickinson with 24 points, 14 rebounds, and a career-high tying five blocks, for his 30th career double-double, while Bufkin added 19 points, Howard added 16 points and McDaniel added 10 points. With 14 rebounds, Dickinson became the ninth Wolverine to surpass the 750-rebound mark, and the sixth Wolverine to reach 1,500 points and 750 rebounds.

== Postseason ==
=== Big Ten tournament ===
On March 9, Michigan opened its 2023 Big Ten men's basketball tournament play with a 62–50 loss to Rutgers in the second round. Michigan was led by Dickinson with a game-high 24 points, seven rebounds and three blocks, while Bufkin added nine points, seven rebounds and five assists. Michigan struggled in the second half, scoring only one field goal until the final minute of the game.

=== NIT tournament ===
On March 12, Michigan received and accepted an at-large bid to the 2023 National Invitation Tournament as the No. 3 seed. This was the Wolverines' first National Invitation Tournament appearance since 2007. On March 14, Michigan began their participation in the 2023 NIT with a 90–80 victory over Toledo in the first round. Michigan was led by Bufkin with a game-high 23 points, eight rebounds and five assists, while Baker added a season-high 21 points, Dickinson added 19 points and nine rebounds, one rebound shy of a double-double, and McDaniel added 16 points and eight assists. Michigan shot a season-high 57 percent (13-for-23) from three-point range.

On March 18, Michigan lost to Vanderbilt in the second round. Michigan was led by Dickinson with 21 points and 11 rebounds, for his 31st career double-double, while McDaniel added 19 points, five rebounds, and three assists, and Baker added 11 points. Michigan opened the game with a 5–0 lead, before Vanderbilt answered with a 17–0 run to force a Michigan timeout with 12:51. Michigan responded with a 15–3 run to tie the game at 20. During the final five minutes of the half the teams shot a combined 33 percent (five-for-15) from the field, and Michigan led the game 30–29 at half-time. Vanderbilt took advantage of three Michigan turnovers in the final minute of the game to go on a 9–0 run and take a one-point lead with 12 seconds remaining in the game. Michigan missed layup attempts by McDaniel and Dickinson in the final seconds, and Vanderbilt won the game. Youssef Khayat started in his first career game, replacing an injured Bufkin, and scored three points and three rebounds in 17 minutes. With his double-double Dickinson tied Loy Vaught for sixth most all-time in Michigan program history. McDaniel became the sixth Michigan freshman to record at least 250 points, 100 rebounds and 100 assists in their freshman season, and the first since Derrick Walton Jr. in 2013–14.

== Schedule and results ==
Date time, TV	Rank^{#}	Opponent^{#}	Result	Record	High points	High rebounds	High assists	Site (attendance) city, state
Exhibition
November 4, 2022*; 7:00 p.m., BTN+	No. 22	Ferris State	W 88–75	–	30 – Je. Howard	6 – Llewellyn	6 – McDaniel	Crisler Center; Ann Arbor, MI
Regular season
November 7, 2022*; 6:30 p.m., BTN	No. 22	Purdue Fort Wayne	W 75–56	1–0	22 – Dickinson	12 – Dickinson	5 – Je. Howard	Crisler Center (11,107); Ann Arbor, MI
November 11, 2022*; 9:00 p.m., ESPNU	No. 22	vs. Eastern Michigan	W 88–83	2–0	31 – Dickinson	11 – Williams II	5 – McDaniel	Little Caesars Arena (14,204); Detroit, MI
November 16, 2022*; 6:00 p.m., ESPNU	No. 20	vs. Pittsburgh; Legends Classic semifinals	W 91–60	3–0	17 – Je. Howard	7 – Tied	8 – McDaniel	Barclays Center (5,778); Brooklyn, NY
November 17, 2022*; 9:00 p.m., ESPN2	No. 20	vs. Arizona State; Legends Classic championship	L 62–87	3–1	14 – Dickinson	5 – Dickinson	3 – Bufkin	Barclays Center (5,677); Brooklyn, NY
November 20, 2022*; 7:30 p.m., BTN	No. 20	Ohio	W 70–66 ^{OT}	4–1	24 – Dickinson	14 – Dickinson	4 – Tied	Crisler Center (12,068); Ann Arbor, MI
November 23, 2022*; 8:30 p.m., BTN		Jackson State	W 78–68	5–1	19 – Je. Howard	12 – Dickinson	4 – Tied	Crisler Center (10,244); Ann Arbor, MI
November 29, 2022*; 9:30 p.m., ESPN		No. 3 Virginia; ACC–Big Ten Challenge	L 68–70	5–2	23 – Dickinson	7 – Tied	2 – Tied	Crisler Center (12,200); Ann Arbor, MI
December 4, 2022*; 1:00 p.m., ABC		vs. No. 19 Kentucky; Basketball Hall of Fame London Showcase	L 69–73	5–3	23 – Dickinson	9 – Dickinson	4 – Llewellyn	The O2 Arena (8,242); London, England
December 8, 2022; 9:00 p.m., BTN		at Minnesota	W 90–75	6–3 (1–0)	19 – Dickinson	8 – Williams II	7 – McDaniel	Williams Arena (10,004); Minneapolis, MN
December 17, 2022*; 4:00 p.m., BTN+		Lipscomb	W 83–75	7–3	22 – Bufkin	8 – McDaniel	4 – Je. Howard	Crisler Center (12,470); Ann Arbor, MI
December 21, 2022*; 7:00 p.m., ESPN		vs. North Carolina; Jumpman Invitational	L 76–80	7–4	22 – Bufkin	11 – Williams II	5 – McDaniel	Spectrum Center (19,236); Charlotte, NC
December 30, 2022*; 7:00 p.m., BTN+		Central Michigan	L 61–63	7–5	16 – Bufkin	6 – Dickinson	3 – McDaniel	Crisler Center (12,707); Ann Arbor, MI
January 1, 2023; 4:30 p.m., FS1		Maryland	W 81–46	8–5 (2–0)	32 – Dickinson	12 – Dickinson	5 – Je. Howard	Crisler Center (12,176); Ann Arbor, MI
January 4, 2023; 7:00 p.m., BTN		Penn State	W 79–69	9–5 (3–0)	17 – Dickinson	9 – Williams II	5 – Bufkin	Crisler Center (12,707); Ann Arbor, MI
January 7, 2023; 2:30 p.m., FOX		at Michigan State; Rivalry	L 53–59	9–6 (3–1)	18 – Dickinson	7 – Dickinson	4 – McDaniel	Breslin Center (14,797); East Lansing, MI
January 12, 2023; 7:00 p.m., ESPN2		at Iowa	L 84–93 ^{OT}	9–7 (3–2)	34 – Je. Howard	13 – Dickinson	7 – Tied	Carver–Hawkeye Arena (11,498); Iowa City, IA
January 15, 2023; 12:00 p.m., BTN		Northwestern	W 85–78	10–7 (4–2)	20 – Bufkin	15 – Dickinson	7 – Je. Howard	Crisler Center (12,009); Ann Arbor, MI
January 19, 2023; 7:00 p.m., ESPN		at Maryland	L 58–64	10–8 (4–3)	19 – Dickinson	13 – Williams II	7 – McDaniel	Xfinity Center (12,656); College Park, MD
January 22, 2023; 1:00 p.m., BTN		Minnesota	W 60–56	11–8 (5–3)	23 – Dickinson	9 – Dickinson	3 – McDaniel	Crisler Center (12,092); Ann Arbor, MI
January 26, 2023; 9:00 p.m., FS1		No. 1 Purdue	L 70–75	11–9 (5–4)	21 – Dickinson	7 – Dickinson	4 – Dickinson	Crisler Center (12,707); Ann Arbor, MI
January 29, 2023; 12:00 p.m., BTN		at Penn State	L 61–83	11–10 (5–5)	21 – Je. Howard	6 – Tied	3 – Tied	Bryce Jordan Center (12,047); University Park, PA
February 2, 2023; 7:00 p.m., ESPN2		at Northwestern	W 68–51	12–10 (6–5)	19 – Dickinson	12 – Bufkin	9 – McDaniel	Welsh–Ryan Arena (6,234); Evanston, IL
February 5, 2023; 1:00 p.m., CBS		Ohio State; Rivalry	W 77–69	13–10 (7–5)	26 – Dickinson	11 – Dickinson	5 – Bufkin	Crisler Center (12,707); Ann Arbor, MI
February 8, 2022; 6:30 p.m., BTN		Nebraska	W 93–72	14–10 (8–5)	22 – Je. Howard	10 – Dickinson	5 – Bufkin	Crisler Center (11,889); Ann Arbor, MI
February 11, 2023; 6:00 p.m., ESPN		No. 18 Indiana	L 61–62	14–11 (8–6)	16 – Dickinson	7 – Dickinson	2 – Tied	Crisler Center (12,707); Ann Arbor, MI
February 14, 2023; 9:00 p.m., ESPN2		at Wisconsin	L 59–64	14–12 (8–7)	21 – Bufkin	12 – Dickinson	2 – Tied	Kohl Center (15,436); Madison, WI
February 18, 2023; 8:00 p.m., FOX		Michigan State; Rivalry	W 84–72	15–12 (9–7)	18 – McDaniel	10 – Reed	4 – McDaniel	Crisler Center (12,707); Ann Arbor, MI
February 23, 2023; 8:30 p.m., FS1		at Rutgers	W 58–45	16–12 (10–7)	16 – McDaniel	11 – Dickinson	3 – Tied	Jersey Mike's Arena (8,000); Piscataway, NJ
February 26, 2023; 2:00 p.m., CBS		Wisconsin	W 87–79 ^{OT}	17–12 (11–7)	28 – Bufkin	10 – Dickinson	4 – Dickinson	Crisler Center (12,707); Ann Arbor, MI
March 2, 2023; 7:00 p.m., ESPN		at Illinois	L 87–91 ^{2OT}	17–13 (11–8)	31 – Dickinson	16 – Dickinson	4 – McDaniel	State Farm Center (15,544); Champaign, IL
March 5, 2023; 4:30 p.m., CBS		at No. 15 Indiana	L 73–75 ^{OT}	17–14 (11–9)	24 – Dickinson	14 – Dickinson	4 – Tied	Simon Skjodt Assembly Hall (17,222); Bloomington, IN
Big Ten tournament
March 9, 2023; 12:00 p.m., BTN	(8)	vs. (9) Rutgers; Second Round	L 50–62	17–15	24 – Dickinson	7 – Tied	5 – Bufkin	United Center (15,537); Chicago, IL
NIT tournament
March 14, 2023; 7:00 p.m., ESPN2	(3)	Toledo; First Round – Clemson Bracket	W 90–80	18–15	23 – Bufkin	9 – Dickinson	8 – McDaniel	Crisler Center (4,521); Ann Arbor, MI
March 18, 2023; 12:00 p.m., ESPN	(3)	at (2) Vanderbilt; Second Round – Clemson Bracket	L 65–66	18–16	21 – Dickinson	11 – Dickinson	3 – McDaniel	Memorial Gymnasium (8,337); Nashville, TN
*Non-conference game. ^{#}Rankings from AP Poll. (#) Tournament seedings in parentheses. All times are in Eastern Time. Source:

== Rankings ==
Ranking movements Legend: ██ Increase in ranking ██ Decrease in ranking — = Not ranked RV = Received votes
	Week																			
Poll	Pre	1	2	3	4	5	6	7	8	9	10	11	12	13	14	15	16	17	18	Final
AP	22	20	RV	RV	—	—	—	—	—	—	—	—	—	—	—	—	—	—	—	Not released
Coaches'	22	21	RV	RV	—	—	—	—	—	—	—	—	—	—	—	—	—	—	—	

*AP does not release post-NCAA Tournament rankings.

== Honors ==
Following the season, Hunter Dickinson was a first team All-Big Ten honoree by the media and second team honoree by the coaches. Both Jett Howard and Kobe Bufkin were third team honorees by the coaches and honorable mention honorees by the media. Howard was also an All-Freshman honoree by the Big Ten coaches.

== Team players drafted into the NBA ==
Jett Howard was drafted 11th overall in the first round of the 2023 NBA draft by the Orlando Magic. Kobe Bufkin was drafted 15th overall in the 2023 NBA draft by the Atlanta Hawks. After spending his final two years of eligibility with the UConn Huskies, Tarris Reed was drafted 26th overall in the first round of the 2026 NBA draft by the Denver Nuggets.

Year	Round	Pick	Overall	Player	NBA club
2023	1	11	11	Jett Howard	Orlando Magic
2023	1	15	15	Kobe Bufkin	Atlanta Hawks
2026	1	26	26	Tarris Reed	Denver Nuggets
