= JZ Zaher =

American basketball player (born 2004)

No. 12 – Birmingham Squadron
- Position: Point guard
- League: NBA G League

Personal information
- Born: July 1, 2004 (age 22) Fenton, Michigan, U.S.
- Listed height: 6 ft 0 in (1.83 m)
- Listed weight: 170 lb (77 kg)

Career information
- High school: Powers Catholic (Flint, Michigan)
- College: Eastern Michigan (2022–2023); Bowling Green (2023–2024)
- NBA draft: 2024: undrafted
- Playing career: 2024–present

Career history
- 2024–2025: Delaware Blue Coats
- 2025–present: Birmingham Squadron

Joseph Raji "JZ" Zaher (born July 1, 2004) is an American professional basketball player for the Birmingham Squadron of the NBA G League. He played college basketball for the Eastern Michigan Eagles and the Bowling Green Falcons.

== Early life and high school career ==
Zaher was born in Fenton, Michigan. He attended Powers Catholic High School in Flint, Michigan. During his senior campaign at Flint Powers Catholic, Zaher averaged 4.4 points, 1.6 rebounds, and 0.4 assists per game.

== College career ==
Zaher is a sophomore guard for the Bowling Green State University (BGSU) Falcons. He wears jersey number 17. Prior to joining BGSU, Zaher played for Eastern Michigan.

During the 2023–24 season, Zaher appeared in seven games for the Falcons. He recorded a season-high of four points against Ohio Dominican on December 10, including the first three-pointer of his college career. He averaged 4.4 minutes, 0.7 points, and 1.0 rebounds per game.

In a significant move, Zaher declared for the 2024 NBA draft. This made him the first Falcon to declare for the 2024 draft.

== Professional career ==
After going undrafted in the 2024 NBA draft, Zaher joined the Delaware Blue Coats of the NBA G League on October 28, 2024.

On October 25, 2025, Zaher, the 31st pick in the G League draft, and Darryl Morsell were traded to the Birmingham Squadron in exchange for Chris Mantis and the 20th pick in the G League draft.

== Career statistics ==
Legend
GP	Games played	GS	Games started	MPG	Minutes per game
FG%	Field goal percentage	3P%	3-point field goal percentage	FT%	Free throw percentage
RPG	Rebounds per game	APG	Assists per game	SPG	Steals per game
BPG	Blocks per game	PPG	Points per game	**Bold**	Career high

=== College ===
Year	Team	GP	GS	MPG	FG%	3P%	FT%	RPG	APG	SPG	BPG	PPG
2022–23	Eastern Michigan	2	0	1.0	—	—	—	.0	.0	.0	.0	.0
2023–24	Bowling Green	**7**	0	**4.4**	**.125**	**.125**	**.400**	**1.0**	.0	**.1**	.0	**.7**
Career		9	0	3.7	.125	.125	.400	.8	.0	.1	.0	.6
