= 2022–23 Eastern Michigan Eagles men's basketball team =

American college basketball season

2022–23 Eastern Michigan Eagles men's basketball
- Conference: Mid-American Conference
- Record: 8–23 (5–13 MAC)
- Head coach: Stan Heath (2nd season)
- Assistant coaches: Shawn Trice (2nd season); Bob Simon (2nd season); Drew Denisco (2nd season)
- Home arena: George Gervin GameAbove Center

2022–23 Mid-American Conference men's basketball standings
	Conf.				Overall
Team	W		L	PCT	W		L	PCT
Toledo	16	–	2	.889	27	–	8	.771
Kent State †	15	–	3	.833	28	–	7	.800
Akron	13	–	5	.722	22	–	11	.667
Ball State	11	–	7	.611	20	–	12	.625
Ohio	10	–	8	.556	19	–	14	.576
Buffalo	9	–	9	.500	15	–	17	.469
Northern Illinois	9	–	9	.500	13	–	19	.406
Miami (OH)	6	–	12	.333	12	–	20	.375
Bowling Green	5	–	13	.278	11	–	20	.355
Eastern Michigan	5	–	13	.278	8	–	23	.258
Central Michigan	5	–	13	.278	10	–	21	.323
Western Michigan	4	–	14	.222	8	–	23	.258
† 2023 MAC tournament winner

The 2022–23 Eastern Michigan Eagles men's basketball team represented Eastern Michigan University during the 2022–23 NCAA Division I men's basketball season. The Eagles, led by second-year head coach Stan Heath, played their home games at the George Gervin GameAbove Center in Ypsilanti, Michigan as members of the Mid-American Conference. They finished 8–23 with a 5–13 MAC record. They finished tied for ninth in the MAC and failed to qualify for the MAC tournament.

== Previous season ==
The Eagles finished the 2021–22 season 10–21 and 5–15 in MAC play to finish in eleventh place. They failed to qualify for the MAC tournament.

== Offseason ==
=== Departures ===
Departures
Name	Number	Pos.	Height	Weight	Year	Hometown	Reason
Bryce McBride	4	G	6'2"	175	Junior	Jackson, Tennessee	Transferred to Youngstown State
Mo Njie	13	C	6'10"	245	Freshman	Centerville, Ohio	Transferred to SMU
Malcolm Clements	14	G	6'3"	170	Freshman	Ypsilanti, Michigan	Transferred to Henry Ford College
Monty Scott	2	G	6'5"	200	Senior	Union, New Jersey	Exhausted Eligibility
Darion Spottsville	10	G	6'4"	205	Senior	Phoenix, Arizona	Signed for Grises de Humacao
Axel Okongo	15	F	7'0"	240	Senior	Saâcy-sur-Marne, France	
Thomas Binelli	23	F	6'10"	240	Senior	Bologna, Italy	Exhausted Eligibility
Nate Scott	25	G/F	6'8"	210	Senior	Naperville, Illinois	

=== Incoming transfers ===
Incoming transfers
Name	Number	Pos.	Height	Weight	Year	Hometown	Previous School
Tyson Acuff	2	G	6'4"	190	Junior	Detroit, Michigan	Duquesne
Jalin Billingsley	4	F	6'8"	225	Sophomore	Cleveland, Ohio	Georgetown
Emoni Bates	21	F	6'9"	190	Sophomore	Ypsilanti, Michigan	Memphis
Legend Geeter	23	F	6'8"	235	Sophomore	River Rouge, Michigan	Providence

=== Recruiting class ===
College recruiting information
Name	Hometown	School	Height	Weight	Commit date
Orlando Lovejoy; G	Detroit, Michigan	Summit Academy North	6 ft 2 in (1.88 m)	185 lb (84 kg)	
Orlando Lovejoy; G	Recruit ratings: Scout: Rivals: 247Sports: (NR)				
JZ Zaher; G	Fenton, Michigan	Powers Catholic	6 ft 0 in (1.83 m)	164 lb (74 kg)	
JZ Zaher; G	Recruit ratings: Scout: Rivals: 247Sports: (NR)				
Overall recruit ranking:
Note: In many cases, Scout, Rivals, 247Sports, On3, and ESPN may conflict in their listings of height and weight.; In these cases, the average was taken. ESPN grades are on a 100-point scale.; Sources: "2022 Team Ranking". Rivals.

== Pre Season Awards ==
- Emoni Bates (Pre-Season All-MAC 2nd Team)

== Roster ==
2022–23 Eastern Michigan Eagles men's basketball team
Players
Coaches

Pos.	#	Name	Height	Weight	Year	Previous school	Hometown
G	0	Kevin-David Rice	6 ft 4 in (1.93 m)	200 lb (91 kg)	So	Grand Blanc; Delta College	Flint, MI
F	1	Colin Golson Jr.	6 ft 6 in (1.98 m)	230 lb (104 kg)	So	Ferndale; Siena	Detroit, MI
G	2	Noah Farrakhan	6 ft 2 in (1.88 m)	162 lb (73 kg)	So	The Patrick School; East Carolina	Hillside, NJ
G	3	Luka Savicevic	6 ft 3 in (1.91 m)	150 lb (68 kg)	So	Sports Academy Skopje	Skopje, North Macedonia
F	4	Jalin Billingsley	6 ft 7 in (2.01 m)	218 lb (99 kg)	So	Lutheran East; Georgetown	Cleveland, OH
G	5	Tyson Acuff	6 ft 4 in (1.93 m)	196 lb (89 kg)	So	Cass Technical; Duquesne	Detroit, MI
G	10	Orlando Lovejoy	6 ft 2 in (1.88 m)	184 lb (83 kg)	Fr	Summit Academy North	Detroit, MI
G	12	Andrew Wells	6 ft 3 in (1.91 m)	163 lb (74 kg)	So	International Sports Academy	East Lansing, MI
G	13	Prakash Ketterhagen	6 ft 3 in (1.91 m)	208 lb (94 kg)	RS Fr	New Rochelle; Combine Academy	Kalamazoo, MI
F	15	Derik Pranger	6 ft 9 in (2.06 m)	186 lb (84 kg)	Fr	Colorado Prep	Parker, CO
F	21	Emoni Bates	6 ft 10 in (2.08 m)	170 lb (77 kg)	So	Ypsi Prep; Memphis	Ypsilanti, MI
F	22	Yusuf Jihad	6 ft 7 in (2.01 m)	220 lb (100 kg)	So	North Farmington; Oakland	Farmington Hills, MI
F	23	Legend Geeter	6 ft 7 in (2.01 m)	230 lb (104 kg)	RS Fr	River Rouge; Providence	River Rouge, MI
G	30	JZ Zaher	5 ft 11 in (1.8 m)	164 lb (74 kg)	Fr	Flint Powers Catholic	Fenton, MI
F	33	Derek Ballard Jr.	6 ft 8 in (2.03 m)	232 lb (105 kg)	GS	Southfield-Lathrup	Southfield, MI
F	35	Javantae Randle	6 ft 9 in (2.06 m)	205 lb (93 kg)	RS Fr	Frederick Douglass	Detroit, MI

Head coach

- Stan Heath (Eastern Michigan)

Assistant coach(es)

- Shawn Trice (Penn)
- Bob Simon (Eastern Michigan)
- Drew Denisco (Wittenberg)

Legend

- (C) Team captain
- (S) Suspended
- (I) Ineligible
- (W) Walk-on
- Injured
- Current redshirt

Roster

== Schedule and results ==
Date time, TV	Rank^{#}	Opponent^{#}	Result	Record	High points	High rebounds	High assists	Site (attendance) city, state
Exhibition
October 27, 2022*; 7:00 p.m.		Grand Valley State	W 85–69		27 – Bates	11 – Geeter	4 – Geeter	George Gervin GameAbove Center (2,487); Ypsilanti, MI
Non-conference regular season
November 7, 2022*; 7:30 p.m., ESPN3		Wayne State	W 75–66	1–0	18 – Lovejoy	8 – Geeter	4 – Savicevic	George Gervin GameAbove Center (4,677); Ypsilanti, MI
November 11, 2022*; 9:00 p.m., ESPNU		vs. No. 22 Michigan	L 83–88	1–1	30 – Bates	6 – Farrakhan	4 – Acuff	Little Caesars Arena (14,204); Detroit, MI
November 15, 2022*; 8:00 p.m., ESPN+		at Bradley; Cancún Challenge	L 61–89	1–2	20 – Bates	6 – Bates	3 – Tied	Carver Arena (4,110); Peoria, IL
November 19, 2022*; 3:00 p.m., ESPN+		at Oakland; Cancún Challenge	L 90–92 ^{OT}	1–3	19 – Bates	6 – Geeter	4 – Tied	Athletics Center O'rena (4,059); Rochester, MI
November 22, 2022*; 12:30 p.m., FloSports		vs. Purdue Fort Wayne; Cancún Challenge	L 67–74	1–4	16 – Bates	6 – Farrakhan	4 – Farrakhan	Hard Rock Hotel Riviera (250); Cancún, Mexico
November 23, 2022*; 12:30 p.m., FloSports		vs. Winthrop; Cancún Challenge	L 87–101	1–5	25 – Acuff	10 – Geeter	2 – Tied	Hard Rock Hotel Riviera (107); Cancún, Mexico
November 27, 2022*; 2:00 p.m., ESPN+		UC San Diego	L 63–66	1–6	17 – Bates	13 – Bates	5 – Acuff	George Gervin GameAbove Center (2,340); Ypsilanti, MI
November 30, 2022*; 7:00 p.m., ESPN+		at Florida International	W 80–68	2–6	26 – Bates	8 – Tied	4 – Acuff	Ocean Bank Convocation Center (1,150); Miami, FL
December 4, 2022*; 2:30 p.m., ESPN+		Florida Atlantic	L 73–101	2–7	29 – Bates	6 – Bates	2 – Farrakhan	George Gervin GameAbove Center (4,192); Ypsilanti, MI
December 7, 2022*; 8:00 p.m., ESPN+		at Illinois State	L 81–87	2–8	14 – Acuff	5 – Golson	4 – Tied	Redbird Arena (3,331); Normal, IL
December 11, 2022*; 1:00 p.m., ESPN+		at Niagara	L 60–67	2–9	21 – Farrakhan	5 – Jihad	4 – Farrakhan	Gallagher Center (897); Lewiston, NY
December 18, 2022*; 3:00 p.m., ESPN+		Detroit Mercy	W 79–77	3–9	19 – Tied	7 – Geeter	6 – Acuff	George Gervin GameAbove Center (2,823); Ypsilanti, MI
December 30, 2022*; 7.00 p.m., SEC Network		at South Carolina	L 64–74	3–10	36 – Bates	7 – Randle	2 – Bates	Colonial Life Arena (9,023); Columbia, SC
MAC regular season
January 3, 2023; 7:00 p.m., ESPN+		Bowling Green	L 65–91	3–11 (0–1)	15 – Bates	7 – Jihad	1 – Tied	George Gervin GameAbove Center (2,305); Ypsilanti, MI
January 7, 2023; 7:00 p.m., ESPN3		Central Michigan	W 62–56	4–11 (1–1)	26 – Bates	10 – Bates	2 – Acuff	George Gervin GameAbove Center (2,531); Ypsilanti, MI
January 10, 2023; 7:00 p.m., ESPN+		at Western Michigan	L 79–85	4–12 (1–2)	23 – Bates	6 – Bates	3 – Tied	University Arena (3,017); Kalamazoo, MI
January 13, 2023; 7:00 p.m., ESPNU		at Akron	L 67–104	4–13 (1–3)	18 – Farrakhan	4 – Tied	2 – Tied	James A. Rhodes Arena (2,177); Akron, OH
January 17, 2023; 7:00 p.m., ESPN+		Kent State	L 63–77	4–14 (1–4)	24 – Bates	6 – Bates	3 – Acuff	George Gervin GameAbove Center (2,212); Ypsilanti, MI
January 21, 2023; 3:30 p.m., ESPN3		Northern Illinois	L 67–88	4–15 (1–5)	26 – Farrakhan	8 – Farrakhan	3 – Tied	George Gervin GameAbove Center (4,719); Ypsilanti, MI
January 24, 2023; 7:00 p.m., CBSSN		at Toledo	L 79–84	4–16 (1–6)	43 – Bates	9 – Farrakhan	5 – Farrakhan	Savage Arena (5,162); Toledo, OH
January 28, 2023; 3:45 p.m., ESPN3		at Miami (OH)	W 74–69	5–16 (2–6)	20 – Farrakhan	6 – Tied	4 – Bates	Millett Hall (3,096); Oxford, OH
January 31, 2023; 7:00 p.m., ESPN+		Ohio	W 90–79	6–16 (3–6)	29 – Acuff	4 – Geeter	6 – Acuff	George Gervin GameAbove Center (2,472); Ypsilanti, MI
February 3, 2023; 2:00 p.m., CBSSN		at Ball State; Red Out	L 90-91	6–17 (3–7)	35 – Bates	6 – Tied	2 – Tied	Worthen Arena (6,068); Muncie, IN
February 7, 2023; 7:00 p.m., ESPN+		at Buffalo; Equality & Inclusion Night	L 97–102	6–18 (3–8)	35 – Acuff	5 – Tied	4 – Tied	Alumni Arena (4,507); Buffalo, NY
February 11, 2023; 7:30 p.m., ESPN3		Toledo	L 63–70	6–19 (3–9)	36 – Acuff	10 – Bates	3 – Farrakhan	George Gervin GameAbove Center (5,390); Ypsilanti, MI
February 14, 2023; 7:00 p.m., ESPN+		Akron	L 51–78	6–20 (3–10)	13 – Bates	5 – Farrakhan	3 – Tied	George Gervin GameAbove Center (2,122); Ypsilanti, MI
February 17, 2023; 4:00 p.m., CBSSN		at Kent State; Black History Celebration/ Greek Night	L 54–81	6–21 (3–11)	15 – Bates	11 – Bates	1 – Tied	MAC Center (2,095); Kent, OH
February 21, 2023; 7:00 p.m., ESPN+		Western Michigan	W 66–59	7–21 (4–11)	17 – Bates	7 – Bates	2 – Farrakhan	George Gervin GameAbove Center (2,703); Ypsilanti, MI
February 25, 2023; 3:30 p.m., ESPN3		Ball State; Senior Day	W 75–68	8–21 (5–11)	24 – Bates	11 – Bates	3 – Tied	George Gervin GameAbove Center (5,287); Ypsilanti, MI
February 28, 2023; 7:00 p.m., ESPN+		at Bowling Green; Rocky Night	L 68–88	8–22 (5–12)	15 – Lovejoy	4 – Acuff	3 – Tied	Stroh Center (2,123); Bowling Green, OH
March 3, 2023; 8:00 p.m., ESPN3		at Northern Illinois; Senior Day	L 66–85	8–23 (5–13)	26 – Acuff	4 – Tied	3 – Tied	Convocation Center (729); DeKalb, IL
*Non-conference game. ^{#}Rankings from AP Poll. (#) Tournament seedings in parentheses. All times are in Eastern Time.

== Post Season Awards ==
- Emoni Bates (3rd Team All-MAC)
- Yusuf Jihad (Academic All-MAC)
