= 2022–23 Toledo Rockets men's basketball team =

American college basketball season

2022–23 Toledo Rockets men's basketball

MAC regular season champions

NIT, First Round
- Conference: Mid-American Conference
- Record: 27–8 (16–2 MAC)
- Head coach: Tod Kowalczyk (13th season)
- Associate head coach: Jeff Massey (9th season)
- Assistant coaches: Justin Ingram (5th season); Jordan Lauf (1st season)
- Home arena: Savage Arena

2022–23 Mid-American Conference men's basketball standings
	Conf.				Overall
Team	W		L	PCT	W		L	PCT
Toledo	16	–	2	.889	27	–	8	.771
Kent State †	15	–	3	.833	28	–	7	.800
Akron	13	–	5	.722	22	–	11	.667
Ball State	11	–	7	.611	20	–	12	.625
Ohio	10	–	8	.556	19	–	14	.576
Buffalo	9	–	9	.500	15	–	17	.469
Northern Illinois	9	–	9	.500	13	–	19	.406
Miami (OH)	6	–	12	.333	12	–	20	.375
Bowling Green	5	–	13	.278	11	–	20	.355
Eastern Michigan	5	–	13	.278	8	–	23	.258
Central Michigan	5	–	13	.278	10	–	21	.323
Western Michigan	4	–	14	.222	8	–	23	.258
† 2023 MAC tournament winner

The 2022–23 Toledo Rockets men's basketball team represented the University of Toledo during the 2022–23 NCAA Division I men's basketball season. The Rockets, led by 13th-year head coach Tod Kowalczyk, played their home games at Savage Arena, as members of the Mid-American Conference. They won their third straight regular season championship with a 16-2 record in MAC Play. They defeated Miami and Ohio in the first two rounds of the MAC tournament before losing to Kent State in the final. As a regular season champion who did not win their conference tournament, they received an automatic bid to the National Invitation Tournament, where they lost to Michigan in the first round.

== Previous season ==
The Rockets finished the 2021–22 season 26-8, 17-3 in MAC Play to finish as regular season champions. They defeated Central Michigan in the quarterfinals of the MAC tournament before losing in the semifinals to Kent State. As a No. 1 seed who failed to win their conference tournament, they received an automatic bid to the National Invitation Tournament, where they lost in the first round to Dayton.

== Offseason ==
=== Departures ===
Departures
Name	Pos.	Height	Weight	Year	Hometown	Reason for departure
Ryan Rollins	G	6'4"	180	Sophomore	Macomb Township, Michigan	Declared for NBA draft
Jordan Burge	G	6'3"	200	RS sophomore	Cleveland, Ohio	Transferred to Lake Erie
Mihal Cârcoană	C	6'11"	240	Freshman	Luduș, Romania	Transferred to South Dakota
Arnór Eyþórsson	F	6'7"	190	Freshman	Selfoss, Iceland	Entered Transfer Portal
Jamere Hill	F	6'3"	175	Freshman	Joliet, Illinois	Transferred to Lewis
Keshaun Saunders	G	6'5"	190	RS sophomore	Brampton, Ontario	Transferred to Portland State

=== Incoming transfers ===
Transfers
Name	Pos.	Height	Weight	Year	Hometown	Previous school
Tyler Cochran	G	6'2	220	Sophomore	Bolingbrook, Illinois	Transferred from Ball State
André Lorentsson	F	6'8	215	Freshman	Gothenburg, Sweden	Transferred from Saint Louis
Dante Maddox	G	6'2	195	Freshman	Chicago Heights, Illinois	Transferred from Cal State Fullerton

=== Recruiting class ===
College recruiting
Name	Hometown	School	Height	Weight	Commit date
Javon Simmons; F	Gahanna, Ohio	Gahanna Lincoln	6 ft 7 in (2.01 m)	220 lb (100 kg)	
Javon Simmons; F	Recruit ratings: Scout: Rivals: 247Sports: (85)				
J Wallace; G	Bath, Michigan	Williamston	6 ft 4 in (1.93 m)	205 lb (93 kg)	
J Wallace; G	Recruit ratings: (NR)				
Cooper Davis; G	Powell, Ohio	Olentangy Liberty	6 ft 5 in (1.96 m)	185 lb (84 kg)	
Cooper Davis; G	Recruit ratings: (NR)				
Overall recruit ranking:
Note: In many cases, Scout, Rivals, 247Sports, On3, and ESPN may conflict in their listings of height and weight.; In these cases, the average was taken. ESPN grades are on a 100-point scale.; Sources: "2022 Team Ranking". Rivals.

== Roster ==
2022–23 Toledo Rockets men's basketball team
Players
Coaches

Pos.	#	Name	Height	Weight	Year	Previous school	Hometown
G	0	Ra'Heim Moss	6 ft 4 in (1.93 m)	205 lb (93 kg)	RS So	SPIRE Academy	Springfield, OH
F	1	Javon Simmons	6 ft 7 in (2.01 m)	220 lb (100 kg)	Fr	Gahanna Lincoln	Gahanna, OH
G	2	EJ Farmer	6 ft 5 in (1.96 m)	170 lb (77 kg)	So	Cleveland Heights	Cleveland, OH
G	3	Elijah Wilson	6 ft 5 in (1.96 m)	180 lb (82 kg)	So	Mountain View	Lithonia, GA
F	4	Setric Millner Jr.	6 ft 7 in (2.01 m)	205 lb (93 kg)	Sr	Northwest Florida State College	Little Rock, AR
G	10	RayJ Dennis	6 ft 2 in (1.88 m)	180 lb (82 kg)	Jr	Boise State	Plainfield, IL
F	12	Kooper Jacobi	6 ft 6 in (1.98 m)	200 lb (91 kg)	So	Silver Creek	Sellersburg, IN
F	13	Andre Lorentsson	6 ft 8 in (2.03 m)	215 lb (98 kg)	So	Saint Louis	Gothenburg, Sweden
F/C	15	A. J. Edu	6 ft 10 in (2.08 m)	225 lb (102 kg)	RS Jr	South Gloucestershire and Stroud College	Colchester, England
G	21	Dante Maddox	6 ft 2 in (1.88 m)	195 lb (88 kg)	So	Cal State Fullerton	Chicago Heights, IL
G	22	Tyler Cochran	6 ft 2 in (1.88 m)	195 lb (88 kg)	Jr	Ball State	Bolingbrook, IL
G	24	J Wallace	6 ft 4 in (1.93 m)	205 lb (93 kg)	Fr	Williamston	Bath, MI
G	31	Cooper Davis	6 ft 5 in (1.96 m)	185 lb (84 kg)	Fr	Olentangy Liberty	Powell, OH
F	32	JT Shumate	6 ft 7 in (2.01 m)	210 lb (95 kg)	Sr	Newark; Walsh University	Newark, OH

Head coach

- Tod Kowalczyk (Minnesota Duluth)

Assistant coach(es)

- Jeff Massey (Xavier)
- Justin Ingram (Toledo)
- Jordan Lauf (Toledo)

Roster

Legend

- (C) Team captain
- (S) Suspended
- (I) Ineligible
- (W) Walk-on
- Injured
- Current redshirt

== Schedule and results ==
Date time, TV	Rank^{#}	Opponent^{#}	Result	Record	High points	High rebounds	High assists	Site (attendance) city, state
Exhibition
October 22, 2022*; 11:00 a.m.		Hillsdale	W 100–59	_	–	–	–	Savage Arena; Toledo, OH
October 30, 2022*; 3:00 p.m., TBA		at Findlay	W 100–88	–	–	–	–	Clay Gymnasium; Findlay, OH
Non-conference regular season
November 7, 2022*; 7:00 p.m., ESPN3		Valparaiso	W 85–70	1–0	23 – Dennis	10 – Millner Jr.	4 – Dennis	Savage Arena (4,038); Toledo, OH
November 11, 2022*; 5:00 p.m., BarstoolTV.com		vs. UAB; Barstool Sports Invitational	W 93–85	2–0	23 – Dennis	7 – Cochran	7 – Dennis	Wells Fargo Center; Philadelphia, PA
November 16, 2022*; 7:00 p.m, ESPN+		Oakland	W 112–90	3–0	33 – Shumate	10 – Cochran	12 – Dennis	Savage Arena (4,115); Toledo, OH
November 21, 2022*; 11:00 a.m., FloHoops		vs. Kansas City; Gulf Coast Showcase Quarterfinals	L 71–83	3–1	17 – Dennis	6 – Cochran	2 – Tied	Hertz Arena (467); Estero, FL
November 22, 2022*; 11:00 a.m, FloHoops		vs. East Carolina; Gulf Coast Showcase 5th Place Game	L 75–86	3–2	25 – Shumate	7 – Millner Jr.	4 – Dennis	Hertz Arena (213); Estero, FL
November 23, 2022*; 11:00 a.m., FloHoops		vs. Northern Kentucky; Gulf Coast Showcase 7th Place Game	W 82–62	4–2	22 – Millner	13 – Millner	8 – Dennis	Hertz Arena (142); Estero, FL
November 30, 2022*; 7:00 p.m, ESPN+		Richmond	W 90–67	5–2	20 – Shumate	8 – Moss	5 – Tied	Savage Arena (4,166); Toledo, OH
December 3, 2022*; 2:00 p.m., ESPN+		at George Mason	L 73–80	5–3	20 – Shumate	8 – Tied	5 – Dennis	EagleBank Arena (3,041); Fairfax, VA
December 6, 2022*; 8:30 p.m., ESPN+		at Northern Iowa	W 83–75	6–3	24 – Shumate	6 – Shumate	5 – Dennis	McLeod Center (2,474); Cedar Falls, IA
December 10, 2022*; 2:00 p.m, ESPN3		Canisius	W 69–68	7–3	29 – Dennis	9 – Dennis	6 – Dennis	Savage Arena (4,320); Toledo, OH
December 17, 2022*; 3:30 p.m., ESPN+		at Marshall	L 85–100	7–4	21 – Shumate	8 – Shumate	8 – Dennis	Cam Henderson Center (4,065); Huntington, WV
December 20, 2022*; 2:00 p.m., ESPN+		at Vermont	W 84–72	8–4	19 – Shumate	10 – Millner	5 – Dennis	Patrick Gym (1,879); Burlington, VT
December 29, 2022*; 6:00 p.m, TBA		Lourdes	W 103–88	9–4	25 – Millner	8 – Shumate	6 – Dennis	Savage Arena (4,196); Toledo, OH
MAC regular season
January 3, 2023; 7:00 p.m, CBSSN		Ball State	L 83–90	9–5 (0–1)	21 – Dennis	9 – Maddux	6 – Dennis	Savage Arena (4,055); Toledo, OH
January 6, 2023; 6:30 p.m, CBSSN		Western Michigan	W 102–74	10–5 (1–1)	23 – Shumate	8 – Moss	5 – Dennis	Savage Arena (4,237); Toledo, OH
January 10, 2023; 7:00 p.m., ESPN+		at Kent State	L 63–75	10–6 (1–2)	16 – Millner	6 – Tied	5 – Dennis	MAC Center (1,626); Kent, OH
January 14, 2023; 4:30 p.m., ESPN3		at Northern Illinois	W 84–67	11–6 (2–2)	18 – Maddox	9 – Edu	5 – Tied	Convocation Center (1,285); DeKalb, IL
January 17, 2023; 7:00 p.m, ESPN+		Ohio	W 90–75	12–6 (3–2)	25 – Dennis	9 – Dennis	7 – Dennis	Savage Arena (4,829); Toledo, OH
January 20, 2023; 8:30 p.m., CBSSN		at Buffalo	W 86–77	13–6 (4–2)	21 – Dennis	8 – Shumate	7 – Dennis	Alumni Arena (2,009); Amherst, NY
January 24, 2023; 7:00 p.m, CBSSN		Eastern Michigan	W 84–79	14–6 (5–2)	20 – Shumate	9 – Shumate	4 – Dennis	Savage Arena (5,162); Toledo, OH
January 28, 2023; 2:00 p.m, ESPN3		Bowling Green	W 91–77	15–6 (6–2)	21 – Millner Jr.	7 – Millner Jr.	6 – Dennis	Savage Arena (6,922); Toledo, OH
January 31, 2023; 7:00 p.m, ESPN+		at Miami (OH)	W 81–78	16–6 (7–2)	29 – Dennis	7 – Moss	6 – Dennis	Millett Hall (1,578); Oxford, OH
February 4, 2023; 7:00 p.m, ESPN3		Central Michigan	W 84–59	17–6 (8–2)	18 – Dennis	6 – Shumate	8 – Dennis	Savage Arena (5,344); Toledo, OH
February 7, 2023; 7:00 p.m, ESPN+		at Akron	W 84–74	18–6 (9–2)	20 – Millner Jr.	9 – Millner Jr.	5 – Dennis	James A. Rhodes Arena (2,041); Akron, OH
February 11, 2023; 7:00 p.m, ESPN3		at Eastern Michigan	W 70–63	19–6 (10–2)	18 – Dennis	10 – Dennis	3 – Millner Jr.	George Gervin GameAbove Center (5,390); Ypsilanti, MI
February 14, 2023; 7:00 p.m., ESPN+		Miami (OH)	W 89–71	20–6 (11–2)	19 – Millner Jr.	6 – Maddox Jr.	4 – Dennis	Savage Arena (4,527); Toledo, OH
February 18, 2023; 5:00 p.m., ESPN3		at Bowling Green	W 91–86	21–6 (12–2)	27 – Dennis	7 – Dennis	7 – Dennis	Stroh Center (4,151); Bowling Green, OH
February 21, 2023; 7:00 p.m., ESPN+		Akron	W 84–63	22–6 (13–2)	20 – Tied	7 – Millner Jr.	5 – Maddox Jr.	Savage Arena (5,677); Toledo, OH
February 25, 2023; 2:00 p.m., ESPN3		Buffalo	W 101–71	23–6 (14–2)	18 – Maddox Jr.	8 – Dennis	11 – Dennis	Savage Arena (6,014); Toledo, OH
February 28, 2023; 7:00 p.m., ESPN+		at Central Michigan	W 99–65	24–6 (15–2)	32 – Millner Jr.	6 – Tied	6 – Dennis	McGuirk Arena (1,565); Mount Pleasant, MI
March 3, 2023; 6:00 p.m., CBSSN		at Ball State	W 87–81	25–6 (16–2)	32 – Dennis	7 – Shumate	7 – Dennis	Worthen Arena (4,441); Muncie, IN
MAC tournament
March 9, 2022; 11:00 a.m., ESPN+	(1)	vs. (8) Miami (OH); Quarterfinals	W 91–75	26–6	19 – Millner Jr.	7 – Millner Jr.	6 – Moss	Rocket Mortgage FieldHouse (3,852); Cleveland, OH
March 10, 2022; 5:00 p.m., CBSSN	(1)	vs. (5) Ohio; Semifinals	W 82–75	27–6	28 – Dennis	6 – Dennis	2 – Dennis	Rocket Mortgage FieldHouse (9,295); Cleveland, OH
March 11, 2022; 7:30 p.m., ESPN2	(1)	vs. (2) Kent State; Championship	L 78–93	27–7	25 – Millner Jr.	10 – Millner Jr.	3 – Dennis	Rocket Mortgage FieldHouse (8,375); Cleveland, OH
NIT
March 14, 2023; 7:00 p.m., ESPN2	(6)	at (3) Michigan; First round – Clemson bracket	L 80–90	27–8	19 – Millner Jr.	7 – Shumate	8 – Dennis	Crisler Center (4,521); Ann Arbor, MI
*Non-conference game. ^{#}Rankings from AP Poll. (#) Tournament seedings in parentheses. All times are in Eastern Time.
