= Dug McDaniel =

American basketball player (born 2003)

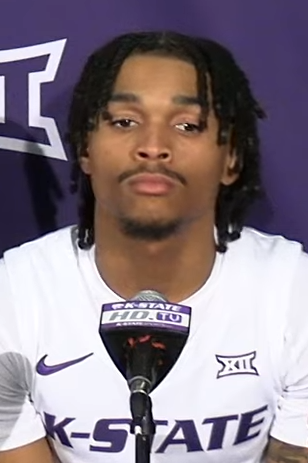
- McDaniel with the Kansas State Wildcats in 2024

No. 1 – Memphis Tigers
- Position: Point guard
- League: American Athletic Conference

Personal information
- Born: January 8, 2003 (age 23) Washington, D.C., U.S.
- Listed height: 5 ft 11 in (1.80 m)
- Listed weight: 170 lb (77 kg)

Career information
- High school: Paul VI (Chantilly, Virginia)
- College: Michigan (2022–2024); Kansas State (2024–2025); Memphis (2025–present)

Knasir Douglas "Dug" McDaniel (born January 8, 2003) is an American college basketball player for the Memphis Tigers. He previously played for the Kansas State Wildcats and the Michigan Wolverines.

== Early life ==
McDaniel attended Paul VI Catholic High School, where he played both basketball and football. McDaniel was rated as a four-star recruit, the number 14 overall point guard, and the 83rd best player in the class of 2022. McDaniel committed to play college basketball for the Michigan Wolverines over offers from schools such as UConn, Florida, Georgia, LSU and Penn State.

== College career ==
=== Michigan ===
==== Freshman season ====
In his first career start, McDaniel tallied 15 points, seven assists, and three steals in a 90–75 win over Minnesota. In a game against Wisconsin, McDaniel scored a career-high 20 points. He finished his freshman season playing in 34 games with 26 starts, where he averaged 8.6 points, 3.1 rebounds, 3.6 assists, and 1.1 steals per game.

==== Sophomore season ====
In Michigan's season opener, McDaniel scored 22 points and eight assists in a win over UNC Asheville. In a game against Oregon, he knocked down seven threes, racking up 33 points. In a game against the Florida, McDaniel put up 33 points, eight rebounds, and five assists. On January 10, 2024, he was suspended for Michigan's next six road games due to academic issues. On February 27, McDaniel was reinstated from his suspension. In the 2023–24 season, he played in and started 26 games for the Wolverines averaging 16.3 points, 3.7 rebounds, 4.7 assists, and 1.1 steals per game. After the season, McDaniel entered the NCAA transfer portal.

=== Kansas State ===
On April 3, 2024, McDaniel transferred to Kansas State.
