= 2022–23 Summit League men's basketball season =

College men's basketball season

- League: NCAA Division I
- Sport: Basketball
- Teams: 10

Regular season
- Regular season champion: Oral Roberts
- Season MVP: Max Abmas, Oral Roberts

Summit League tournament
- Champions: Oral Roberts
- Runners-up: North Dakota State
- Tournament MVP: Max Abmas, Oral Roberts

Seasons
- ← 2021–22 2023–24 →

2022–23 Summit League men's basketball standings
	Conf.				Overall
Team	W		L	PCT	W		L	PCT
Oral Roberts †	18	–	0	1.000	30	–	5	.857
South Dakota State	13	–	5	.722	19	–	13	.594
North Dakota State	11	–	7	.611	16	–	17	.485
Western Illinois	9	–	9	.500	16	–	14	.533
St. Thomas *	9	–	9	.500	19	–	14	.576
South Dakota	7	–	11	.389	12	–	19	.387
Kansas City	7	–	11	.389	11	–	21	.344
Denver	6	–	12	.333	15	–	17	.469
North Dakota	6	–	12	.333	13	–	20	.394
Omaha	4	–	14	.222	9	–	23	.281
† 2023 Summit League tournament winner * Ineligible for the 2023 NCAA tournament due to transition from Division III

The 2022–23 Summit League men's basketball season started non-conference play on November 7, 2022, and began conference play on December 19, 2022. The regular season ended on February 25, 2023, and the 2023 Summit League men's basketball tournament from March 3 to March 7, 2023.

Oral Roberts finished league play with a perfect 18–0 record, the second time that has happened in the Summit League's history and second year in a row a team has finished with a perfect league record (South Dakota State). In the postseason, Oral Roberts made the 2023 NCAA Division I men's basketball tournament as a 12 seed. They lost to Duke in the first round.

== Conference Changes ==
Following last year's postseason tournament, the Summit League announced they would be expanding the tournament in future years to include all 10 teams. It will consist of an added day to the tournament with the 7 through 10 seeds competing for the typical 7 and 8 seed slots.

== Head coaches ==
=== Coaching Changes ===
==== South Dakota ====
On March 16, 2022, Eric Peterson was announced as the new head coach of the Coyotes, after former coach Todd Lee was let go.

==== Omaha ====
On March 18, 2022, Chris Crutchfield was named head coach of the Mavericks, after longtime coach Derrin Hansen was fired.

==== Kansas City ====
On April 21, 2022, three-year Roos coach Billy Donlon left the program to be an associate head coach at Clemson. Then on April 26, 2022, Marvin Menzies was announced to be the new head coach for Kansas City.

=== Coaches ===
Team	Head Coach	Previous Job	Years At School	Record at School	Summit League Record	Summit League Titles	NCAA tournaments	NCAA Sweet 16's
Denver	Jeff Wulbrun	Stanford (Assistant)	2	11–21	7–11	0	0	0
Kansas City	Marvin Menzies	Grand Canyon (Associate HC)	1	0–0	0–0	0	5	0
Omaha	Chris Crutchfield	Oregon (Assistant)	1	0–0	0–0	0	0	0
North Dakota	Paul Sather	Northern State (Assistant)	4	30–60	17–33	0	0	0
North Dakota State	David Richman	North Dakota State (Assistant)	9	159–97	82–46	3	2	0
Oral Roberts	Paul Mills	Baylor (Assistant)	6	76–79	43–36	1	1	1
St. Thomas	John Tauer	St. Thomas (Assistant)	12	228–70^	4–14	0	0^^	0^^^
South Dakota	Eric Peterson	Utah (Assistant)	1	0–0	0–0	0	0	0
South Dakota State	Eric Henderson	South Dakota State (Assistant)	4	68–22	40–6	1	1	0
Western Illinois	Rob Jeter	Minnesota (Assistant)	3	23–31	12–20	0	0	0

Notes:

- Year at school includes 2022-23 season.
- Overall and Summit League records are from the time at their current school and are through the end of the 2021-22.
- NCAA tournament appearances are from the time at current school only.

^218 wins and 50 losses at the Division III level

^^8 NCAA Division III Tournaments

^^^4 NCAA Division III Sweet 16s, 2 NCAA Division III Final Fours, and 1 NCAA Division III National Championship

== Preseason Awards ==
The Preseason Summit League men's basketball polls were released on October 11, 2022.

=== Preseason men's basketball polls ===
First Place Votes in Parentheses

1. Oral Roberts (28) - 731
2. South Dakota State (11) - 668
3. South Dakota (1) - 602
4. North Dakota State - 549
5. Denver - 432
6. Kansas City - 310
7. Western Illinois - 294
8. St. Thomas - 289
9. Omaha - 279
10. North Dakota - 174

=== Preseason Honors ===
Honor	Recipient
Preseason Player of the Year	Max Abmas, Oral Roberts
Preseason All-Summit League First Team	Max Abmas, Oral Roberts
Preseason All-Summit League First Team	Luke Appel, South Dakota State
Preseason All-Summit League First Team	Frankie Fidler, Omaha
Preseason All-Summit League First Team	Trenton Massner, Western Illinois
Preseason All-Summit League First Team	Zeke Mayo, South Dakota State
Preseason All-Summit League First Team	Grant Nelson, North Dakota State
Preseason All-Summit League Second Team	Mason Archambault, South Dakota
Preseason All-Summit League Second Team	Issac McBride, Oral Roberts
Preseason All-Summit League Second Team	Kruz Perrott-Hunt, South Dakota
Preseason All-Summit League Second Team	A.J. Plitzuweit, South Dakota
Preseason All-Summit League Second Team	Tevin Smith, Denver

== Regular season ==
=== Conference standings ===
Current as of February 25, 2023

		Conference		Overall		
Rank	Team	Record	Percent	Record	Percent	Tiebreaker
1	Oral Roberts	18–0	1.000	27–4	0.871	
2	South Dakota State	13–5	0.722	18–12	0.600	
3	North Dakota State	11–7	0.611	14–16	0.467	
4	Western Illinois	9–9	0.500	16–13	0.552	1–1 vs South Dakota
5	St. Thomas	9–9	0.500	18–13	0.581	0–2 vs South Dakota
7	South Dakota	7–11	0.389	12–18	0.400	2–0 vs St. Thomas
6	Kansas City	7–11	0.389	11–20	0.355	1–1 vs St. Thomas
8	Denver	6–12	0.333	15–16	0.484	1–1 vs Western Illinois
9	North Dakota	6–12	0.333	12–19	0.387	0–2 vs Western Illinois
10	Omaha	4–14	0.222	8–22	0.267	

=== Conference Matrix ===
	Denver	Kansas City	North Dakota	North Dakota State	Omaha	Oral Roberts	St. Thomas	South Dakota	South Dakota State	Western Illinois
vs. Denver	–	1–1	1–1	2–0	1–1	2–0	2–0	0–2	2–0	1–1
vs. Kansas City	1–1	–	2–0	1–1	0–2	2–0	1–1	1–1	2–0	1–1
vs. North Dakota	1–1	0–2	–	2–0	1–1	2–0	1–1	1–1	2–0	2–0
vs. North Dakota State	0–2	1–1	0–2	–	0–2	2–0	1–1	1–1	1–1	1–1
vs. Omaha	1–1	2–0	1–1	2–0	–	2–0	2–0	1–1	2–0	1–1
vs. Oral Roberts	0–2	0–2	0–2	0–2	0–2	–	0–2	0–2	0–2	0–2
vs. St. Thomas	0–2	1–1	1–1	1–1	0–2	2–0	–	2–0	1–1	1–1
vs. South Dakota	2–0	1–1	1–1	1–1	1–1	2–0	0–2	–	2–0	1–1
vs. South Dakota State	0–2	0–2	0–2	1–1	0–2	2–0	1–1	0–2	–	1–1
vs. Western Illinois	1–1	1–1	0–2	1–1	1–1	2–0	1–1	1–1	1–1	–
Total	6–12	7–11	6–12	11–7	4–14	18–0	9–9	7–11	13–5	9–9

Through February 25, 2023

=== Players of the Week ===
Week	Player(s) of the Week	School
Nov. 14	A.J. Plitzuweit	South Dakota
Nov. 21	Riley Miller	St. Thomas
Nov. 28	Rayquawndis Mitchell	Kansas City
Dec. 5	Trenton Massner	Western Illinois
Dec. 12	Boden Skunberg	North Dakota State
Dec. 19	Max Abmas	Oral Roberts
Dec. 26	Parker Bjorklund	St. Thomas (2)
Jan. 2	Zeke Mayo	South Dakota State
Jan. 9	Max Abmas (2)	Oral Roberts (2)
Jan. 16	Max Abmas (3)	Oral Roberts (3)
Jan. 23	Zeke Mayo (2)	South Dakota State (2)
Jan. 30	Trenton Massner (2)	Western Illinois (2)
Feb. 6	Zeke Mayo (3)	South Dakota State (3)
Feb. 13	Max Abmas (4)	Oral Roberts (4)
Feb. 20	Grant Nelson	North Dakota State (2)
Feb. 27	Trenton Massner (3)	Western Illinois (3)

=== Records against other conferences ===
As of January 10, 2023:

Major 7 Conferences	Record	Major 7 Conferences	Record
ACC	None	American	1-2
Big East	0-3	Big Ten	0-4
Big 12	0-4	Pac-12	0-2
SEC	1-5	Major 7 Total	2-19
Other Division I Conferences	Record	Other Division I Conferences	Record
Atlantic 10	1-0	ASUN	1-2
America East	None	Big Sky	3-6
Big South	None	Big West	1-0
Colonial	1-0	Conference USA	0-1
Horizon League	2-2	Ivy League	None
MAAC	None	MAC	1-4
MEAC	None	MVC	4-1
MWC	1-3	NEC	3-0
OVC	2-0	Patriot League	None
SoCon	1-0	Southland	4-0
SWAC	2-0	Sun Belt	2-2
WAC	3-3	WCC	2-3
Other Division I Total			34-26
NCAA Division I Total			36-45
NCAA Division II Total			4-1
NCAA Division III Total			7-0
NAIA Total			3-0
NCCAA Total			1-0
Total Non-Conference Record			50-46

=== Record against ranked non-conference opponents ===
Summit League record against ranked teams (rankings from AP Poll):

Summit League teams in Bold

Date	Visitor	Home	Site	Gamename	Score	Conference record	Reference
Nov 7	Omaha	No. 5 Kansas	Allen Fieldhouse • Lawrence, KS		64-89	0-1	
Nov 7	St. Thomas	No. 9 Creighton	CHI Health Center Omaha • Omaha, NE		60-72	0-2	
Nov 7	North Dakota State	No. 10 Arkansas	Bud Walton Arena • Fayetteville, AR		58-76	0-3	
Nov 10	North Dakota	No. 9 Creighton	CHI Health Center Omaha • Omaha, NE		61-96	0-4	
Nov 10	North Dakota State	No. 5 Kansas	Allen Fieldhouse • Lawrence, KS		59-82	0-5	
Nov 14	Oral Roberts	No. 3 Houston	Fertitta Center • Houston, TX	Cougar Classic	45-83	0-6	
Nov 16	South Dakota State	No. 9 Arkansas	Bud Walton Arena • Fayetteville, AR		56-71	0-7	
Nov 21	Omaha	No. 25 Iowa	Carver-Hawkeye Arena • Iowa City, IA	Emerald Coast Classic - Campus Game	64-100	0-8	
Nov 30	North Dakota	No. 23 Iowa State	James H. Hilton Coliseum • Ames, IA		44-63	0-9	
Dec 3	South Dakota State	No. 11 Alabama	Coleman Coliseum • Tuscaloosa, AL		65-78	0-10	
Dec 10	Denver	No. 19 UCLA	Pauley Pavilion • Los Angeles, CA		64-87	0-11	

Team rankings are reflective of AP poll when the game was played, not current or final ranking

† denotes games was played on neutral site

=== Points scored ===
Team	For	Against	Difference
Denver	2185	2258	-73
Kansas City	1901	1971	-70
North Dakota	2065	2119	-54
North Dakota State	2043	2042	+1
Omaha	2003	2242	-239
Oral Roberts	2455	2046	+409
St. Thomas	2177	2031	+146
South Dakota	1929	2082	-153
South Dakota State	1990	1970	+20
Western Illinois	1981	1963	+18

Through February 18, 2023

=== Home attendance ===
Team	Arena	Capacity	Total Games	Average Attendance	Attendance High	Total Attendance	% of Capacity
Denver	Hamilton Gymnasium	2,500	14	1,001	1,335; Feb. 25 vs. Omaha	14,024	40.1%
Kansas City	Swinney Recreation Center	1,500	14	936	**1,532**; Feb. 18 vs. North Dakota	13,108	62.4%
North Dakota	Betty Engelstad Sioux Center	3,300	16	1,449	2,458; Dec. 30 vs. North Dakota St	23,187	43.9%
North Dakota State	Scheels Center	5,460	13	1,952	3,867; Jan. 27 vs. North Dakota	25,388	35.8%
Omaha	Baxter Arena	7,898	12	2,227	4,316; Dec. 13 vs. Midland	26,734	28.2%
Oral Roberts	Mabee Center	10,154	16	5,314	8,012; Feb. 18 vs. North Dakota St	85,030	52.3%
St. Thomas	Schoenecker Arena	1,800	14	1,264	**2,013**; Feb. 9 vs. Oral Roberts	17,696	70.2%
South Dakota	Sanford Coyote Sports Center	6,000	13	2,024	4,605; Jan. 14 vs. South Dakota St	26,324	33.7%
South Dakota State	Frost Arena	6,500	12	2,288	4,421; Feb. 11 vs. South Dakota	27,464	35.2%
Western Illinois	Western Hall	5,139	14	716	1,681; Feb. 11 vs. Oral Roberts	10,036	13.9%

Bold - Exceed capacity
As of February 25, 2023
Does not include exhibition games

=== All-League Honors ===
Honor	Recipient
Player of the Year	Max Abmas, Oral Roberts
Defensive Player of the Year	Connor Vanover, Oral Roberts
Sixth Man of the Year	Matt Norman, North Dakota
Freshman of the Year	Andrew Rohde, St. Thomas
Newcomer of the Year	Connor Vanover, Oral Roberts
Coach of the Year	Paul Mills, Oral Roberts
All-Summit League First Team	Max Abmas, Oral Roberts
All-Summit League First Team	Trenton Massner, Western Illinois
All-Summit League First Team	Zeke Mayo, South Dakota State
All-Summit League First Team	Grant Nelson, North Dakota State
All-Summit League First Team	Andrew Rohde, St. Thomas
All-Summit League First Team	Connor Vanover, Oral Roberts
All-Summit League Second Team	Shemarri Allen, Kansas City
All-Summit League Second Team	Parker Byorklund, St. Thomas
All-Summit League Second Team	Matt Dentlinger, South Dakota State
All-Summit League Second Team	Issac McBride, Oral Roberts
All-Summit League Second Team	Rayquawndis Mitchell, Kansas City
All-Summit League Honorable Mention	Tommy Bruner, Denver
All-Summit League Honorable Mention	Frankie Fidler, Omaha
All-Summit League Honorable Mention	Tasos Kamateros, South Dakota
All-Summit League Honorable Mention	Kruz Perrott-Hunt, South Dakota
All-Summit League Honorable Mention	Boden Skunberg, North Dakota State
All-Defensive Team	Shemarri Allen, Kansas City
All-Defensive Team	Matt Mims, South Dakota State
All-Defensive Team	Grant Nelson, North Dakota State
All-Defensive Team	Connor Vanover, Oral Roberts
All-Defensive Team	Jesiah West, Western Illinois
All-Newcomer Team	Tommy Bruner, Denver
All-Newcomer Team	William Kyle III, South Dakota State
All-Newcomer Team	Rayquawndis Mitchell, Kansas City
All-Newcomer Team	Andrew Rohde, St. Thomas
All-Newcomer Team	Connor Vanover, Oral Roberts

== Postseason ==
=== Conference Tournament ===
All 10 teams qualify for the Summit League tournament. The tournament is held at the Denny Sanford Premier Center in Sioux Falls, South Dakota. It will be held this season from March 3 to March 7, 2023.

First Round; March 3 ESPN+
8	Denver	68
9	North Dakota	83
7	Kansas City	61
10	Omaha	73

Quarterfinals; March 4 & 5 ESPN+
1	Oral Roberts	96
9	North Dakota	80
4	Western Illinois	60
5	St. Thomas	67
2	South Dakota State	63
10	Omaha	55
3	North Dakota State	70
6	South Dakota	68

Semifinals; March 6 ESPN+
1	Oral Roberts	70
5	St. Thomas	65
2	South Dakota State	79
3	North Dakota State	89

Championship; March 7 ESPN2
1	Oral Roberts	92
3	North Dakota State	58

=== NCAA tournament ===
Seed	Region	School	First Round	Second Round	Sweet Sixteen	Elite Eight	Final Four	Championship
No. 12	Orlando Regional	Oral Roberts	lost to No. 5 Duke 51–74	—	—	—	—	—
	1 Bid	W-L (%):	0–1 (.000)	0–0 (–)	0–0 (–)	0–0 (–)	0–0 (–)	TOTAL: 0–1 (.000)
