= 2022–23 South Dakota Coyotes men's basketball team =

American college basketball season

2022–23 South Dakota Coyotes men's basketball
- Conference: Summit League
- Record: 12–19 (7–11 The Summit)
- Head coach: Eric Peterson (1st season)
- Assistant coaches: Patrick Eberhart; Casey Kasperbauer; Brandon Ubel
- Home arena: Sanford Coyote Sports Center

2022–23 Summit League men's basketball standings
	Conf.				Overall
Team	W		L	PCT	W		L	PCT
Oral Roberts †	18	–	0	1.000	30	–	5	.857
South Dakota State	13	–	5	.722	19	–	13	.594
North Dakota State	11	–	7	.611	16	–	17	.485
Western Illinois	9	–	9	.500	16	–	14	.533
St. Thomas *	9	–	9	.500	19	–	14	.576
South Dakota	7	–	11	.389	12	–	19	.387
Kansas City	7	–	11	.389	11	–	21	.344
Denver	6	–	12	.333	15	–	17	.469
North Dakota	6	–	12	.333	13	–	20	.394
Omaha	4	–	14	.222	9	–	23	.281
† 2023 Summit League tournament winner * Ineligible for the 2023 NCAA tournament due to transition from Division III

The 2022–23 South Dakota Coyotes men's basketball team represented the University of South Dakota in the 2022–23 NCAA Division I men's basketball season. The Coyotes, led by first-year head coach Eric Peterson, played their home games at the Sanford Coyote Sports Center in Vermillion, South Dakota as members of the Summit League.

The Coyotes finished the season 12–19, 7–11 in Summit League play, to finish in sixth place. The Coyotes lost to North Dakota State in the quarterfinals of the Summit League tournament.

== Previous season ==
The Coyotes finished the 2021–22 season 19–12, 11–7 in Summit League play, to finish in fifth place. They defeated Kansas City in the quarterfinals of the Summit League tournament, before losing to South Dakota State in the semifinals.

On March 10, 2022, the school fired head coach Todd Lee after four years at the helm. On March 15, the school named Utah assistant Eric Peterson as the team's new head coach.

== Roster ==
2022–23 South Dakota Coyotes men's basketball team
Players
Coaches

Pos.	#	Name	Height	Weight	Year	Hometown
G	1	Ty Walker	6 ft 0 in (1.83 m)	—	RS Fr	Des Moines, IA
G	2	Damani Hayes	6 ft 4 in (1.93 m)	223 lb (101 kg)	Sr	Mankato, MN
G	3	Max Burchill	6 ft 4 in (1.93 m)	200 lb (91 kg)	So	Sioux Falls, SD
G	5	Kruz Perrott-Hunt	6 ft 3 in (1.91 m)	195 lb (88 kg)	Jr	Auckland, New Zealand
G	10	A.J. Plitzuweit	6 ft 2 in (1.88 m)	170 lb (77 kg)	RS So	Vermillion, SD
G	11	Mason Archambault	6 ft 0 in (1.83 m)	188 lb (85 kg)	Sr	Rapid City, SD
G	12	Cade Kandolin	6 ft 1 in (1.85 m)	—	Fr	Rapid City, SD
F	13	Mihai Carcoana	6 ft 11 in (2.11 m)	240 lb (109 kg)	So	Luduș, Romania
F	15	Jevon Hill	6 ft 9 in (2.06 m)	—	Fr	Wichita, KS
G	22	Keaton Kutcher	6 ft 2 in (1.88 m)	—	So	Mount Vernon, IA
G	23	Paul Bruns	6 ft 4 in (1.93 m)	190 lb (86 kg)	So	Jefferson, SD
G	24	Steven Kramer	6 ft 6 in (1.98 m)	—	Fr	Johnston, IA
F	33	Felix Broström	6 ft 8 in (2.03 m)	—	Fr	Gothenburg, Sweden
F	34	Tasos Kamateros	6 ft 8 in (2.03 m)	240 lb (109 kg)	Jr	Athens, Greece
F	45	Miles Branch	6 ft 9 in (2.06 m)	—	Fr	Lawrence, KS
G	55	Jeremiah Coleman	6 ft 0 in (1.83 m)	—	Fr	Parker, CO

Head coach

- Eric Peterson (UW–La Crosse)

Assistant coach(es)

- Patrick Eberhart (Adams State)
- Casey Kasperbauer (South Dakota)
- Brandon Ubel (Nebraska)

Legend

- (C) Team captain
- (S) Suspended
- (I) Ineligible
- (W) Walk-on
- Injured
- Current redshirt

Roster
Last update: December 22, 2022

== Schedule and results ==
Date time, TV	Rank^{#}	Opponent^{#}	Result	Record	Site (attendance) city, state
Exhibition
October 30, 2022*; 1:00 p.m.		Simpson	W 101–55	–	Sanford Coyote Sports Center (1,354); Vermillion, SD
Non-conference regular season
November 7, 2022*; 7:30 p.m., BTN		at Wisconsin	L 59–85	0–1	Kohl Center (14,349); Madison, WI
November 9, 2022*; 7:00 p.m., MidcoSN/Midco+/ESPN+		Lipscomb	W 85–77	1–1	Sanford Coyote Sports Center (1,984); Vermillion, SD
November 12, 2022*; 5:00 p.m., Midco+		Dakota State	W 82–64	2–1	Sanford Coyote Sports Center (1,611); Vermillion, SD
November 17, 2022*; 8:00 p.m., SECN		at Mississippi State; Fort Myers Tip-Off campus-site game	L 42–79	2–2	Humphrey Coliseum (6,047); Starkville, MS
November 22, 2022*; 1:30 p.m.		vs. LIU; Fort Myers Tip-Off Palms Division semifinals	W 68–58	3–2	Suncoast Credit Union Arena (333); Fort Myers, FL
November 23, 2022*; 12:30 p.m.		vs. Sam Houston; Fort Myers Tip-Off Palms Division championship	L 49–80	3–3	Suncoast Credit Union Arena (340); Fort Myers, FL
November 26, 2022*; 1:00 p.m., ESPN+		at Coastal Carolina	L 59–66	3–4	HTC Center (1,003); Conway, SC
November 28, 2022*; 7:00 p.m., Midco+		Mount Marty	W 97–58	4–4	Sanford Coyote Sports Center (1,689); Vermillion, SD
December 3, 2022*; 2:30 p.m., BYUtv		vs. BYU	W 69–68	5–4	Vivint Arena (11,578); Salt Lake City, UT
December 6, 2022*; 4:00 p.m., MW Network		at Air Force	L 58–79	5–5	Clune Arena (855); Colorado Springs, CO
December 10, 2022*; 1:00 p.m., Midco+		UC Irvine	L 71–83	5–6	Sanford Coyote Sports Center (1,976); Vermillion, SD
December 14, 2022*; 5:00 p.m., MidcoSN/Midco+		Coastal Carolina	L 86–87	5–7	Sanford Coyote Sports Center (1,523); Vermillion, SD
Summit League regular season
December 19, 2022; 7:00 p.m.		at Kansas City	L 45–62	5–8 (0–1)	Swinney Recreation Center (803); Kansas City, MO
December 29, 2022; 7:00 p.m., MidcoSN/Midco+/ESPN+		St. Thomas	W 92–84	6–8 (1–1)	Sanford Coyote Sports Center (1,516); Vermillion, SD
December 31, 2022; 1:00 p.m., Midco+		Western Illinois	W 80–63	7–8 (2–1)	Sanford Coyote Sports Center (1,567); Vermillion, SD
January 5, 2023; 7:00 p.m., MidcoSN/Midco+/ESPN+		at North Dakota	W 62–60	8–8 (3–1)	Betty Engelstad Sioux Center (1,206); Grand Forks, ND
January 7, 2023; 1:00 p.m., ESPN+		at North Dakota State	L 61–73	8–9 (3–2)	Scheels Center (1,702); Fargo, ND
January 14, 2023; 6:00 p.m., MidcoSN2/Midco+/ESPN3		South Dakota State	L 64–82	8–10 (3–3)	Sanford Coyote Sports Center (4,605); Vermillion, SD
January 19, 2023; 7:00 p.m., MidcoSN2/Midco+/ESPN+		Denver	L 60–75	8–11 (3–4)	Sanford Coyote Sports Center (1,687); Vermillion, SD
January 21, 2023; 1:00 p.m., Midco+		Omaha	W 84–68	9–11 (4–4)	Sanford Coyote Sports Center (2,141); Vermillion, SD
January 26, 2023; 6:00 p.m.		at Western Illinois	L 72–75	9–12 (4–5)	Western Hall (937); Macomb, IL
January 28, 2023; 7:00 p.m.		at St. Thomas	W 81–67	10–12 (5–5)	Schoenecker Arena (1,723); St. Paul, MN
January 30, 2023; 7:00 p.m.		at Oral Roberts; Rescheduled from December 21	L 53–103	10–13 (5–6)	Mabee Center (5,224); Tulsa, OK
February 2, 2023; 7:00 p.m., MidcoSN2/Midco+/ESPN+		North Dakota State	W 71–62	11–13 (6–6)	Sanford Coyote Sports Center (1,796); Vermillion, SD
February 4, 2023; 1:00 p.m., Midco+		North Dakota	L 72–86	11–14 (6–7)	Sanford Coyote Sports Center (2,416); Vermillion, SD
February 11, 2023; 6:00 p.m., MidcoSN/Midco+/ESPN3		at South Dakota State	L 67–72	11–15 (6–8)	Frost Arena (4,421); Brookings, SD
February 16, 2023; 7:00 p.m.		at Omaha	L 72–80	11–16 (6–9)	Baxter Arena (1,665); Omaha, NE
February 18, 2023; 2:00 p.m., Pioneer All-Access		at Denver	L 68–86	11–17 (6–10)	Hamilton Gymnasium (979); Denver, CO
February 23, 2023; 7:00 p.m., Midco+/ESPN+		Oral Roberts	L 70–82	11–18 (6–11)	Sanford Coyote Sports Center (1,813); Vermillion, SD
February 25, 2023; 7:00 p.m., Midco+/ESPN3		Kansas City	W 82–48	12–18 (7–11)	Sanford Coyote Sports Center (2,080); Vermillion, SD
Summit League tournament
March 5, 2023; 8:30 p.m., MidcoSN/ESPN+	(6)	vs. (3) North Dakota State; Quarterfinals	L 68–70	12–19	Denny Sanford Premier Center (5,846); Sioux Falls, SD
*Non-conference game. ^{#}Rankings from AP poll. (#) Tournament seedings in parentheses. All times are in Central.
