= 2022–23 North Dakota State Bison men's basketball team =

College men's basketball team season

2022–23 North Dakota State Bison men's basketball
- Conference: Summit League
- Record: 16–17 (11–7 Summit)
- Head coach: David Richman (9th season)
- Associate head coach: Joshua Jones
- Assistant coaches: Josh Sash; Spencer Wilker
- Home arena: Scheels Center

2022–23 Summit League men's basketball standings
	Conf.				Overall
Team	W		L	PCT	W		L	PCT
Oral Roberts †	18	–	0	1.000	30	–	5	.857
South Dakota State	13	–	5	.722	19	–	13	.594
North Dakota State	11	–	7	.611	16	–	17	.485
Western Illinois	9	–	9	.500	16	–	14	.533
St. Thomas *	9	–	9	.500	19	–	14	.576
South Dakota	7	–	11	.389	12	–	19	.387
Kansas City	7	–	11	.389	11	–	21	.344
Denver	6	–	12	.333	15	–	17	.469
North Dakota	6	–	12	.333	13	–	20	.394
Omaha	4	–	14	.222	9	–	23	.281
† 2023 Summit League tournament winner * Ineligible for the 2023 NCAA tournament due to transition from Division III

The 2022–23 North Dakota State Bison men's basketball team represented North Dakota State University during the 2022-23 NCAA Division I men's basketball season. The Bison, led by ninth year head coach David Richman, played their home games at the Scheels Center, as members of the Summit League.
The Bison went into the Summit League tournament as the number 3 seed. They beat South Dakota and South Dakota State before falling to Oral Roberts in the championship game.

== Previous season ==
The Bison finished the 2021–22 season 23–10, 13–5 in Summit League play to finish in second place. In the Summit League tournament, they defeated Denver in the quarterfinals, Oral Roberts in the semifinals, before losing to South Dakota State in the finals.

== Offseason ==
=== Departures ===
Name	Number	Pos.	Height	Weight	Year	Hometown	Reason for departure
Willie Guy	2	G	5'11"	190	Sophomore	Cedar Rapids, Iowa	Transferred to Angelo State (Division II)
Tyree Eady	3	G	6'5"	210	Junior	Middleton, Wisconsin	Transferred to North Texas
Sam Griesel	5	G/F	6'6"	220	Junior	Lincoln, Nebraska	Transferred to Nebraska
Jarius Cook	11	G	6'3"	180	Sophomore	Brooklyn Park, Minnesota	Transferred to Jacksonville
Andrew Kallman	12	G	6'4"	190	Senior	Chaska, Minnesota	Graduated
Maleeck Harden-Hayes	23	G	6'7"	185	Sophomore	Moorhead, Minnesota	Transferred to UNC Wilmington
Kolbe Rada	33	G	6'1"	185	Freshman	Ceresco, Nebraska	Left Team for Personal Reasons
Rocky Kreuser	34	F	6'10"	245	Senior	White Bear Lake, Minnesota	Graduated

=== Incoming transfers ===
Name	Number	Pos.	Height	Weight	Year	Hometown	Previous School
Luke Yoder	5	G	6'0"	180	Junior	Normal, Illinois	Illinois Wesleyan (Division III)
Jacari White	11	G	6'3"	170	Sophomore	Orlando, Florida	State College of Florida (NAIA)

=== 2022 recruiting class ===
College recruiting information
Name	Hometown	School	Height	Weight	Commit date
Tajavis Miller; G	Lubbock, Texas	Frenship High School	6 ft 4 in (1.93 m)	190 lb (86 kg)	Sep 5, 2021
Tajavis Miller; G	Recruit ratings: Scout: Rivals: 247Sports: ESPN: (0)				
Damari Wheeler-Thomas; G	Elgin, Illinois	Larkin High School	6 ft 0 in (1.83 m)	175 lb (79 kg)	Oct 11, 2021
Damari Wheeler-Thomas; G	Recruit ratings: Scout: Rivals: 247Sports: ESPN: (0)				
Lance Waddles; G	Shreveport, Louisiana	Evangel Christian Academy	6 ft 3 in (1.91 m)	180 lb (82 kg)	Mar 20, 2022
Lance Waddles; G	Recruit ratings: Scout: Rivals: 247Sports: ESPN: (0)				
Sam Hastreiter; F	Lincoln, Nebraska	Pius X Catholic High School	6 ft 7 in (2.01 m)	210 lb (95 kg)	Oct 12, 2021
Sam Hastreiter; F	Recruit ratings: Scout: Rivals: 247Sports: ESPN: (0)				
Noah Feddersen; F	Menomonie, Wisconsin	Menomonie High School	6 ft 10 in (2.08 m)	230 lb (100 kg)	Oct 11, 2021
Noah Feddersen; F	Recruit ratings: Scout: Rivals: 247Sports: ESPN: (0)				
Overall recruit ranking:
Note: In many cases, Scout, Rivals, 247Sports, On3, and ESPN may conflict in their listings of height and weight.; In these cases, the average was taken. ESPN grades are on a 100-point scale.; Sources: "2021 Team Ranking". Rivals.

== Roster ==
2022–23 North Dakota State Bison men's basketball team
Players
Coaches

Pos.	#	Name	Height	Weight	Year	Previous school	Hometown
G	0	Dezmond McKinney	6 ft 0 in (1.83 m)	180 lb (82 kg)	Jr	Raytown South High School	Raytown, MO
G	2	Tajavis Miller	6 ft 4 in (1.93 m)	190 lb (86 kg)	Fr	Frenship High School	Lubbock, TX
F	4	Grant Nelson	6 ft 11 in (2.11 m)	235 lb (107 kg)	So	Devils Lake High School	Devils Lake, ND
G	5	Luke Yoder	6 ft 0 in (1.83 m)	180 lb (82 kg)	Jr	Illinois Wesleyan	Normal, IL
G	10	Damari Wheeler-Thomas	6 ft 0 in (1.83 m)	175 lb (79 kg)	Fr	Larkin High School	Elgin, IL
G	11	Jacari White	6 ft 3 in (1.91 m)	170 lb (77 kg)	So	State College of Florida	Orlando, FL
G	12	Lance Waddles	6 ft 3 in (1.91 m)	180 lb (82 kg)	Fr	Evangel Christian Academy	Shreveport, LA
G	14	Boden Skunberg	6 ft 5 in (1.96 m)	205 lb (93 kg)	Jr	Jamestown High School	Jamestown, ND
F	22	Joshua Streit	6 ft 9 in (2.06 m)	235 lb (107 kg)	So	Eden Valley-Watkins High School	Watkins, MN
F	23	Andrew Morgan	6 ft 10 in (2.08 m)	245 lb (111 kg)	So	Waseca High School	Waseca, MN
G	24	Ryan Sletten (W)	6 ft 4 in (1.93 m)	170 lb (77 kg)	RS Fr	Larimore High School	Larimore, ND
F	33	Sam Hastreiter	6 ft 7 in (2.01 m)	210 lb (95 kg)	Fr	Pius X Catholic High School	Lincoln, NE
F	34	Noah Feddersen	6 ft 10 in (2.08 m)	230 lb (104 kg)	Fr	Menomonie High School	Menomonie, WI

Head coach

- David Richman (North Dakota State)

Assistant coach(es)

- Joshua Jones (Eastern Kentucky)
- Josh Sash (William Penn)
- Spencer Wilker (North Dakota State)

Legend

- (C) Team captain
- (S) Suspended
- (I) Ineligible
- (W) Walk-on
- Injured
- Current redshirt

Roster
Last update: September 17, 2022

== Schedule and results ==
Date time, TV	Rank^{#}	Opponent^{#}	Result	Record	High points	High rebounds	High assists	Site (attendance) city, state
Exhibition
November 2, 2022*; 7:00 pm		Minnesota–Crookston	W 98–64	–	22 – Morgan	8 – Tied	6 – Yoder	Scheels Center (912); Fargo, ND
Non-conference regular season
November 7, 2022*; 7:00 pm, SECN+/ESPN+		at No. 10 Arkansas	L 58–76	0–1	17 – Tied	7 – Morgan	4 – Yoder	Bud Walton Arena (19,200); Fayetteville, AR
November 10, 2022*; 7:00 pm, Big 12 on ESPN+		at No. 5т Kansas	L 59–82	0–2	11 – Nelson	9 – Nelson	4 – Skunberg	Allen Fieldhouse (16,300); Lawrence, KS
November 13, 2022*; 1:00 pm, WDAY Xtra/ESPN+		Pacific	L 86–91	0–3	24 – Hastreiter	12 – Nelson	9 – Miller	Scheels Arena (1,073); Fargo, ND
November 17, 2022*; 6:00 pm, ESPN+		at Indiana State	L 75–101	0–4	20 – Miller	9 – Hastreiter	5 – Yoder	Hulman Center (3,002); Terre Haute, IN
November 20, 2022*; 1:00 pm, WDAY Xtra/ESPN+		Crown College	W 76–55	1–4	23 – Morgan	14 – Morgan	3 – Skunberg	Scheels Center (953); Fargo, ND
November 25, 2022*; 8:30 pm		vs. Northern Colorado; Lobo Classic	L 70–80	1–5	31 – Nelson	7 – Nelson	3 – Skunberg	The Pit (9,033); Albuquerque, NM
November 26, 2022*; 6:00 pm		at New Mexico; Lobo Classic	L 55–76	1–6	22 – Morgan	8 – Morgan	4 – Skunberg	The Pit (8,715); Albuquerque, NM
November 27, 2022*; 4:00 pm		vs. Jacksonville State; Lobo Classic	L 71–81	1–7	19 – White	5 – Morgan	5 – Nelson	The Pit (7,023); Albuquerque, NM
December 3, 2022*; 4:00 pm, ESPN+		at Eastern Washington	L 70–78	1–8	14 – Tied	5 – Tied	4 – Skunberg	Reese Court (748); Cheney, WA
December 5, 2022*; 9:00 pm		at Portland	W 67–62	2–8	20 – Skunberg	10 – Skunberg	2 – Tied	Chiles Center (906); Portland, OR
December 10, 2022*; 7:00 pm, WDAY Xtra/ESPN+		Montana	L 75–82	2–9	22 – Skunberg	7 – Skunberg	2 – Tied	Scheels Center (1,658); Fargo, ND
December 11, 2022*; 5:00 pm, WDAY Xtra/ESPN+		Waldorf	W 99–54	3–9	19 – Skunberg	11 – Nelson	4 – Nelson	Scheels Center (812); Fargo, ND
Summit League regular season
December 19, 2022; 6:00 pm		at Western Illinois	L 60–79	3–10 (0–1)	35 – Nelson	16 – Nelson	2 – Miller	Western Hall (533); Macomb, IL
December 21, 2022; 12:00 pm		at St. Thomas	L 68–78	3–11 (0–2)	15 – Tied	9 – Nelson	3 – White	Schoenecker Arena (1,123); St. Paul, MN
December 30, 2022; 7:00 pm, MidcoSN/ESPN3		at North Dakota	W 71–49	4–11 (1–2)	18 – Nelson	8 – Tied	2 – Tied	Betty Engelstad Sioux Center (2,458); Grand Forks, ND
January 5, 2023; 7:00 pm, WDAY Xtra/ESPN+		South Dakota State	W 65–59	5–11 (2–2)	24 – Morgan	13 – Morgan	3 – Morgan	Scheels Center (1,653); Fargo, ND
January 7, 2023; 1:00 pm, WDAY Xtra/ESPN+		South Dakota	W 73–61	6–11 (3–2)	18 – White	9 – Morgan	3 – Skunberg	Scheels Center (1,702); Fargo, ND
January 12, 2023; 8:00 pm, Altitude 2		at Denver	W 90–70	7–11 (4–2)	17 – Nelson	9 – Nelson	4 – Morgan	Hamilton Gymnasium (740); Denver, CO
January 14, 2023; 12:00 pm		at Omaha	W 78–65	8–11 (5–2)	25 – Skunberg	9 – Nelson	5 – Miller	Baxter Arena (1,639); Omaha, NE
January 19, 2023; 7:00 pm, WDAY Xtra/ESPN+		Oral Roberts	L 69–92	8–12 (5–3)	21 – Nelson	8 – Miller	4 – Skunberg	Scheels Center (3,265); Fargo, ND
January 21, 2023; 1:00 pm, WDAY Xtra/ESPN+		Kansas City	L 73–75	8–13 (5–4)	29 – Morgan	8 – Morgan	3 – Nelson	Scheels Center (1,954); Fargo, ND
January 27, 2023; 7:00 pm, ABC ND/ESPN+		North Dakota	W 91–75	9–13 (6–4)	36 – Nelson	8 – Streit	3 – Miller	Scheels Center (3,867); Fargo, ND
February 2, 2023; 7:00 pm, MidcoSN2/ESPN+		at South Dakota	L 62–71	9–14 (6–5)	23 – Skunberg	13 – Nelson	4 – Nelson	Sanford Coyote Sports Center (1,796); Vermillion, SD
February 4, 2023; 2:00 pm, MidcoSN2/ESPN3		at South Dakota State	L 85–90	9–15 (6–6)	27 – Nelson	15 – Nelson	4 – Wheeler-Thomas	Frost Arena (3,031); Brookings, SD
February 9, 2023; 7:00 pm, WDAY Xtra/ESPN+		Omaha	W 84–58	10–15 (7–6)	19 – Nelson	13 – Nelson	5 – Nelson	Scheels Center (1,805); Fargo, ND
February 11, 2023; 1:00 pm, WDAY Xtra/ESPN+		Denver	W 78–70	11–15 (8–6)	30 – Skunberg	11 – Nelson	8 – Nelson	Scheels Center (2,283); Fargo, ND
February 16, 2023; 7:00 pm		at Kansas City	W 69–58	12–15 (9–6)	22 – Nelson	14 – Nelson	3 – Wheeler-Thomas	Swinney Recreation Center (938); Kansas City, MO
February 18, 2023; 7:00 pm		at Oral Roberts	L 66–74	12–16 (9–7)	24 – Nelson	12 – Nelson	2 – Tied	Mabee Center (8,012); Tulsa, OK
February 23, 2023; 7:00 pm, ABC ND/ESPN+		St. Thomas	W 73–64	13–16 (10–7)	20 – Nelson	12 – Skunberg	3 – Miller	Scheels Center (1,761); Fargo, ND
February 25, 2023; 1:00 pm, WDAY Xtra/ESPN+		Western Illinois	W 71–69	14–16 (11–7)	24 – Skunberg	4 – Tied	2 – Tied	Scheels Center (2,602); Fargo, ND
Summit League tournament
March 5, 2023; 8:30 pm, MidcoSN/ESPN+	(3)	vs. (6) South Dakota; Quarterfinals	W 70–68	15–16	23 – Nelson	11 – Nelson	4 – Nelson	Denny Sanford Premier Center (5,846); Sioux Falls, SD
March 6, 2023; 8:30 pm, MidcoSN/ESPN+	(3)	vs. (2) South Dakota State; Semifinals	W 89–79	16–16	24 – Skunberg	22 – Nelson	7 – Wheeler-Thomas	Denny Sanford Premier Center (7,707); Sioux Falls, SD
March 7, 2023; 8:00 pm, ESPN2	(3)	vs. (1) Oral Roberts; Championship	L 58–92	16–17	18 – Skunberg	8 – Skunberg	2 – Morgan	Denny Sanford Premier Center (5,011); Sioux Falls, SD
*Non-conference game. ^{#}Rankings from AP Poll. (#) Tournament seedings in parentheses. All times are in Central.

== Awards and Accolades ==
=== Summit League Player of the Week ===
Week	Player(s) of the Week	School
Dec 12	Boden Skunberg	North Dakota State
Feb 20	Grant Nelson	North Dakota State (2)

=== All-League Awards ===
==== All-Summit League First Team ====
- Grant Nelson

==== All-Summit League Honorable Mention ====
- Boden Skunberg

==== All-Summit League Defensive Team ====
- Grant Nelson

=== All-Tournament Team ===
- Grant Nelson
- Boden Skunberg
