= 2022–23 Denver Pioneers men's basketball team =

American college basketball season

2022–23 Denver Pioneers men's basketball
- Conference: Summit League
- Record: 15–17 (6–12 The Summit)
- Head coach: Jeff Wulbrun (2nd season)
- Assistant coaches: Rob Zewe; Rob Williams; Jerry Brown
- Home arena: Hamilton Gymnasium

2022–23 Summit League men's basketball standings
	Conf.				Overall
Team	W		L	PCT	W		L	PCT
Oral Roberts †	18	–	0	1.000	30	–	5	.857
South Dakota State	13	–	5	.722	19	–	13	.594
North Dakota State	11	–	7	.611	16	–	17	.485
Western Illinois	9	–	9	.500	16	–	14	.533
St. Thomas *	9	–	9	.500	19	–	14	.576
South Dakota	7	–	11	.389	12	–	19	.387
Kansas City	7	–	11	.389	11	–	21	.344
Denver	6	–	12	.333	15	–	17	.469
North Dakota	6	–	12	.333	13	–	20	.394
Omaha	4	–	14	.222	9	–	23	.281
† 2023 Summit League tournament winner * Ineligible for the 2023 NCAA tournament due to transition from Division III

The 2022–23 Denver Pioneers men's basketball team represented the University of Denver in the 2022–23 NCAA Division I men's basketball season. The Pioneers, led by second-year head coach Jeff Wulbrun, played their home games at Hamilton Gymnasium in Denver, Colorado as members of the Summit League.

The Pioneers finished the season 15–17, 6–12 in Summit League play, to finish in a tie for eighth place. They were defeated by North Dakota in the first round of the Summit League tournament.

== Previous season ==
The Pioneers finished the 2021–22 season 11–21, 7–11 in Summit League play, to finish in a tie for sixth place. They were defeated by North Dakota State in the quarterfinals of the Summit League tournament.

== Roster ==
2022–23 Denver Pioneers men's basketball team
Players
Coaches

Pos.	#	Name	Height	Weight	Year	Hometown
G	0	Tommy Bruner	6 ft 1 in (1.85 m)	180 lb (82 kg)	Jr	Columbia, SC
G	1	Tevin Smith	6 ft 5 in (1.96 m)	195 lb (88 kg)	So	Danville, IL
G	2	Dan Mukuna	6 ft 8 in (2.03 m)	195 lb (88 kg)	Fr	Dortmund, Germany
G	3	Korey Hess	5 ft 11 in (1.8 m)	160 lb (73 kg)	Jr	Centennial, CO
G	5	Coban Porter	6 ft 5 in (1.96 m)	200 lb (91 kg)	So	Columbia, MO
G	10	Marko Lukic	6 ft 7 in (2.01 m)	195 lb (88 kg)	Jr	Belgrade, Serbia
F	11	James IV Sanders	6 ft 3 in (1.91 m)	207 lb (94 kg)	Sr	Fountain, CO
F	13	Lukas Kisunas	6 ft 10 in (2.08 m)	265 lb (120 kg)	GS	Vilnius, Lithuania
G	14	Drake Muller	6 ft 4 in (1.93 m)	205 lb (93 kg)	Jr	Cedar Hill, TX
F	15	Pedro Lopez-Sanvicente	6 ft 8 in (2.03 m)	220 lb (100 kg)	So	Canary Islands, Spain
G	20	Justin Mullins	6 ft 6 in (1.98 m)	190 lb (86 kg)	Fr	Oak Park, IL
G	21	Carlos Fuentes	6 ft 6 in (1.98 m)	195 lb (88 kg)	RS So	Alicante, Spain
F	23	Tyree Corbett	6 ft 7 in (2.01 m)	200 lb (91 kg)	GS	Philadelphia, PA
F	25	Touko Tainamo	6 ft 9 in (2.06 m)	220 lb (100 kg)	So	Helsinki, Finland
G	40	Ben Bowen	6 ft 5 in (1.96 m)	170 lb (77 kg)	RS Fr	Highlands Ranch, CO
F	42	JaVonni Bickham	6 ft 6 in (1.98 m)	231 lb (105 kg)	Sr	Minneapolis, MN

Head coach

- Jeff Wulbrun (Cal State Fullerton)

Assistant coach(es)

- Rob Zewe (Pittsburgh)
- Rob Williams (UAB)
- Jerry Brown (Fresno State)

Legend

- (C) Team captain
- (S) Suspended
- (I) Ineligible
- (W) Walk-on
- Injured
- Current redshirt

Roster
Last update: November 22, 2022

== Schedule and results ==
Date time, TV	Rank^{#}	Opponent^{#}	Result	Record	Site (attendance) city, state
Regular season
November 7, 2022*; 5:00 p.m., Altitude 2		Idaho	W 68–63	1–0	Hamilton Gymnasium (1,255); Denver, CO
November 10, 2022*; 7:00 p.m., Evoca		Colorado College	W 90–68	2–0	Hamilton Gymnasium (1,049); Denver, CO
November 14, 2022*; 7:00 p.m., Altitude 2		Sacramento State	L 69–73	2–1	Hamilton Gymnasium (1,113); Denver, CO
November 18, 2022*; 7:00 p.m., ESPN+		at Idaho State	W 70–69	3–1	Reed Gym (1,227); Pocatello, ID
November 23, 2022*; 3:00 p.m.		vs. IUPUI; Big Easy MTE	W 86–64	4–1	Lakefront Arena (545); New Orleans, LA
November 24, 2022*; 3:00 p.m.		vs. The Citadel; Big Easy MTE	W 74–71	5–1	Lakefront Arena (213); New Orleans, LA
November 25, 2022*; 1:00 p.m., ESPN+		at New Orleans; Big Easy MTE	W 77–76	6–1	Lakefront Arena (933); New Orleans, LA
December 1, 2022*; 7:00 p.m., ESPN+		at Houston Christian	W 93–83	7–1	Sharp Gymnasium (633); Houston, TX
December 4, 2022*; 2:00 p.m., Altitude 2		Texas A&M–Commerce	W 84–75	8–1	Hamilton Gymnasium (1,191); Denver, CO
December 7, 2022*; 7:00 p.m., ESPN+		at Sacramento State	L 85–87 ^{OT}	8–2	Hornets Nest (690); Sacramento, CA
December 10, 2022*; 1:00 p.m., P12N		at No. 19 UCLA	L 64–87	8–3	Pauley Pavilion (6,459); Los Angeles, CA
December 14, 2022*; 7:00 p.m., Altitude 2		Colorado Christian	W 85–74	9–3	Hamilton Gymnasium (872); Denver, CO
December 19, 2022; 6:00 p.m.		at Omaha	L 66–83	9–4 (0–1)	Baxter Arena (2,505); Omaha, NE
December 21, 2022*; 8:00 p.m., P12N		at Oregon State	L 52–57	9–5	Gill Coliseum (2,617); Corvallis, OR
December 29, 2022; 7:00 p.m., Altitude 2		Kansas City	W 85–83 ^{3OT}	10–5 (1–1)	Hamilton Gymnasium (1,021); Denver, CO
December 31, 2022; 1:00 p.m., Altitude		Oral Roberts	L 62–80	10–6 (1–2)	Hamilton Gymnasium (1,081); Denver, CO
January 5, 2023; 6:00 p.m.		at St. Thomas	L 71–81	10–7 (1–3)	Schoenecker Arena (981); St. Paul, MN
January 7, 2023; 1:00 p.m.		at Western Illinois	L 74–91	10–8 (1–4)	Western Hall (508); Macomb, IL
January 12, 2023; 7:00 p.m., Altitude 2		North Dakota State	L 70–90	10–9 (1–5)	Hamilton Gymnasium (740); Denver, CO
January 14, 2023; 1:00 p.m., Evoca		North Dakota	W 78–71	11–9 (2–5)	Hamilton Gymnasium (790); Denver, CO
January 19, 2023; 6:00 p.m., ESPN+		at South Dakota	W 75–60	12–9 (3–5)	Sanford Coyote Sports Center (1,687); Vermillion, SD
January 21, 2023; 1:00 p.m., ESPN+		at South Dakota State	L 61–76	12–10 (3–6)	Frost Arena (2,317); Brookings, SD
January 26, 2023; 6:00 p.m.		at Oral Roberts	L 61–102	12–11 (3–7)	Mabee Center (5,249); Tulsa, OK
January 28, 2023; 6:00 p.m.		at Kansas City	L 60–70	12–12 (3–8)	Swinney Recreation Center (1,221); Kansas City, MO
February 2, 2023; 7:00 p.m., Altitude 2		Western Illinois	W 74–44	13–12 (4–8)	Hamilton Gymnasium (689); Denver, CO
February 4, 2023; 4:00 p.m., Evoca		St. Thomas	L 57–68	13–13 (4–9)	Hamilton Gymnasium (992); Denver, CO
February 9, 2023; 6:00 p.m., ESPN+		at North Dakota	L 63–86	13–14 (4–10)	Betty Engelstad Sioux Center (1,448); Grand Forks, ND
February 11, 2023; 12:00 p.m., ESPN+		at North Dakota State	L 70–78	13–15 (4–11)	Scheels Center (2,283); Fargo, ND
February 16, 2023; 7:00 p.m., Altitude		South Dakota State	L 75–80	13–16 (4–12)	Hamilton Gymnasium (917); Denver, CO
February 18, 2023; 1:00 p.m., Evoca		South Dakota	W 86–68	14–16 (5–12)	Hamilton Gymnasium (979); Denver, CO
February 25, 2023; 3:00 p.m., Altitude		Omaha	W 72–61	15–16 (6–12)	Hamilton Gymnasium (1,335); Denver, CO
Summit League tournament
March 3, 2023; 6:00 p.m., ESPN+	(8)	vs. (9) North Dakota; First round	L 68–83	15–17	Denny Sanford Premier Center; Sioux Falls, SD
*Non-conference game. ^{#}Rankings from AP Poll. (#) Tournament seedings in parentheses. All times are in Mountain.
