= 2022–23 St. Thomas Tommies (Minnesota) men's basketball team =

American college basketball season

2022–23 St. Thomas (Minnesota) Tommies men's basketball
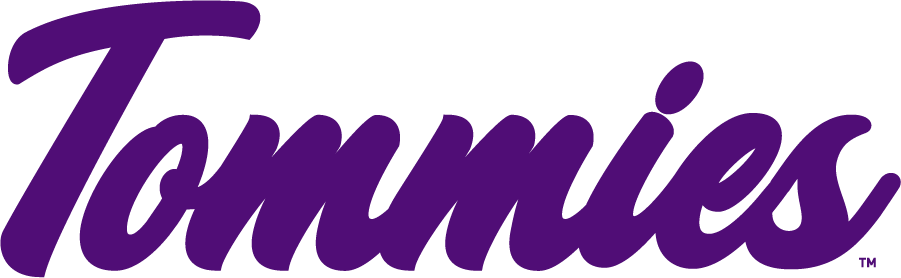
- Conference: Summit League
- Record: 19–14 (9–9 Summit)
- Head coach: John Tauer (12th season)
- Associate head coach: Mike Maker
- Assistant coaches: Cameron Rundles; Kenneth Lowe
- Home arena: Schoenecker Arena

2022–23 Summit League men's basketball standings
	Conf.				Overall
Team	W		L	PCT	W		L	PCT
Oral Roberts †	18	–	0	1.000	30	–	5	.857
South Dakota State	13	–	5	.722	19	–	13	.594
North Dakota State	11	–	7	.611	16	–	17	.485
Western Illinois	9	–	9	.500	16	–	14	.533
St. Thomas *	9	–	9	.500	19	–	14	.576
South Dakota	7	–	11	.389	12	–	19	.387
Kansas City	7	–	11	.389	11	–	21	.344
Denver	6	–	12	.333	15	–	17	.469
North Dakota	6	–	12	.333	13	–	20	.394
Omaha	4	–	14	.222	9	–	23	.281
† 2023 Summit League tournament winner * Ineligible for the 2023 NCAA tournament due to transition from Division III

The 2022–23 St. Thomas Tommies men's basketball team represented the University of St. Thomas in the 2022–23 NCAA Division I men's basketball season. The Tommies, led by twelfth-year head coach John Tauer, played their home games at Schoenecker Arena in St. Paul, Minnesota as members of the Summit League.

This season marked St. Thomas's second year of a five-year transition period from Division III to Division I, an incredibly rare and historic jump that bypasses Division II altogether. As a result, the Tommies were not eligible for NCAA postseason play until 2026–27. Despite this, the Tommies were able to participate in their first-ever Division I conference tournament, as the Summit League announced the 2023 Summit League men's basketball tournament would include all ten conference teams. They defeated Western Illinois in their first-ever conference tournament game before falling to top-seeded Oral Roberts in the conference quarterfinals.

== Previous season ==
The Tommies finished the 2021–22 season 10–20, 4–14 in Summit League play, to finish in a tie for eighth place. Because the Tommies were in the first year of a five-year transition period from DIII to DI, they were not eligible for NCAA postseason play, including the Summit League tournament.

== Roster ==
2022–23 St. Thomas (Minnesota) Tommies men's basketball team
Players
Coaches

Pos.	#	Name	Height	Weight	Year	Previous school	Hometown
G	1	Kendall Blue	6 ft 6 in (1.98 m)	190 lb (86 kg)	Fr	East Ridge High School	Woodbury, MN
G	2	Ben Nau	6 ft 2 in (1.88 m)	190 lb (86 kg)	So	Brookfield Central High School	Brookfield, WI
G	3	Andrew Rohde	6 ft 6 in (1.98 m)	185 lb (84 kg)	Fr	Brookfield Central High School	Milwaukee, WI
F	5	Parker Bjorklund	6 ft 6 in (1.98 m)	200 lb (91 kg)	GS	Chaska High School	Chaska, MN
G	10	Riley Miller	6 ft 3 in (1.91 m)	185 lb (84 kg)	GS	Benilde-St. Margaret's	Eden Prairie, MN
G	11	Drake Dobbs	6 ft 2 in (1.88 m)	175 lb (79 kg)	So	Eden Prairie High School	Eden Prairie, MN
G	12	Ryan Dufault	6 ft 0 in (1.83 m)	185 lb (84 kg)	So	Waseca High School	Waseca, MN
F	13	Ahjany Lee	6 ft 9 in (2.06 m)	215 lb (98 kg)	Fr	Totino-Grace High School	Byron, MN
F	14	Brooks Allen	6 ft 7 in (2.01 m)	210 lb (95 kg)	Sr	Shakopee High School	Shakopee, MN
F	20	Courtney Jr. Brown	6 ft 7 in (2.01 m)	215 lb (98 kg)	Jr	Milwaukee	Cottage Grove, MN
F	23	Will Engels	6 ft 5 in (1.96 m)	195 lb (88 kg)	Sr	Benet Academy	Clarendon Hills, IL
G	32	Dom Martinelli	6 ft 4 in (1.93 m)	195 lb (88 kg)	Jr	Northwestern	Glenview, IL
F	33	Bennett Kwiecinski	6 ft 9 in (2.06 m)	205 lb (93 kg)	Jr	Siena	Chicago, IL
F	35	Carter Bjerke	6 ft 9 in (2.06 m)	250 lb (113 kg)	Fr	Wayzata High School	Plymouth, MN

Head coach

- John Tauer (St. Thomas (MN))

Assistant coach(es)

- Mike Maker (Cal Baptist)
- Cameron Rundles (Wofford)
- Kenneth Lowe (Purdue)

Legend

- (C) Team captain
- (S) Suspended
- (I) Ineligible
- (W) Walk-on
- Injured
- Current redshirt

Roster
Last update: December 16, 2022

== Schedule and results ==
Date time, TV	Rank^{#}	Opponent^{#}	Result	Record	High points	High rebounds	High assists	Site (attendance) city, state
Regular season
November 7, 2022*; 7:30 p.m., FS1		at No. 9 Creighton	L 60–72	0–1	15 – Rohde	9 – Engels	3 – 2 tied	CHI Health Center Omaha (17,098); Omaha, NE
November 11, 2022*; 7:00 p.m., Tommies All-Access		Chicago State	W 83–61	1–1	15 – Miller	7 – Lee	5 – Blue	Schoenecker Arena (1,378); St. Paul, MN
November 13, 2022*; 2:00 p.m., Tommies All-Access		St. Francis Brooklyn	W 84–48	2–1	20 – Rohde	7 – Engels	6 – Rohde	Schoenecker Arena (667); St. Paul, MN
November 17, 2022*; 8:30 p.m., ESPN+		at Montana; Zootown Classic	L 59–78	2–2	11 – Rohde	7 – Rohde	3 – Rohde	Dahlberg Arena (2,660); Missoula, MT
November 18, 2022*; 6:00 p.m., ESPN+		vs. Troy; Zootown Classic	W 78–76	3–2	16 – 2 tied	6 – Allen	5 – 2 tied	Dahlberg Arena (251); Missoula, MT
November 19, 2022*; 6:00 p.m., ESPN+		vs. Merrimack; Zootown Classic	W 72–61	4–2	28 – Miller	6 – 2 tied	8 – Rohde	Dahlberg Arena (178); Missoula, MT
November 23, 2022*; 2:00 p.m., ESPN+		at Milwaukee	W 76–72	5–2	20 – Allen	7 – Lee	6 – Allen	UW–Milwaukee Panther Arena (1,813); Milwaukee, WI
November 26, 2022*; 7:00 p.m., P12N		at Utah	L 66–95	5–3	16 – 2 tied	7 – Lee	4 – Dufault	Jon M. Huntsman Center (5,109); Salt Lake City, UT
November 29, 2022*; 7:00 p.m., Tommies All-Access		North Central	W 111–63	6–3	19 – Dufault	7 – Engels	9 – Dufault	Schoenecker Arena (786); St. Paul, MN
December 3, 2022*; 7:00 p.m., Tommies All-Access		Crown	W 91–56	7–3	24 – Miller	6 – 3 tied	5 – Rohde	Schoenecker Arena (874); St. Paul, MN
December 8, 2022*; 8:00 p.m., ESPN+		at Montana State	L 65–82	7–4	22 – Rohde	9 – Rohde	2 – Blue	Worthington Arena (2,609); Bozeman, MT
December 10, 2022*; 7:00 p.m., ESPN+		at Idaho State	W 76–70	8–4	19 – 2 tied	6 – Brown Jr.	4 – Rohde	Reed Gym (1,040); Pocatello, ID
December 13, 2022*; 7:00 p.m., Tommies All-Access		Green Bay	W 82–61	9–4	19 – Miller	5 – 3 tied	4 – Rohde	Schoenecker Arena (1,036); St. Paul, MN
December 19, 2022; 7:00 p.m., Tommies All-Access		North Dakota	W 75–62	10–4 (1–0)	29 – Bjorklund	7 – Brown Jr.	4 – Allen	Schoenecker Arena (985); St. Paul, MN
December 21, 2022; 12:00 p.m., Tommies All-Access		North Dakota State	W 78–68	11–4 (2–0)	19 – Bjorklund	6 – Bjorklund	2 – Allen	Schoenecker Arena (1,123); St. Paul, MN
December 29, 2022; 7:00 p.m., ESPN+		at South Dakota	L 84–92	11–5 (2–1)	22 – Rohde	7 – Bjorklund	5 – Rohde	Sanford Coyote Sports Center (1,516); Vermillion, SD
December 31, 2022; 2:00 p.m., MidcoSN2/ESPN3		at South Dakota State	L 64–71	11–6 (2–2)	30 – Allen	8 – Lee	2 – 3 tied	Frost Arena (2,020); Brookings, SD
January 5, 2023; 7:00 p.m., Tommies All-Access		Denver	W 81–71	12–6 (3–2)	26 – Bjorklund	4 – Bjorklund	5 – Allen	Schoenecker Arena (981); St. Paul, MN
January 7, 2023; 7:00 p.m., Tommies All-Access		Omaha	W 80–58	13–6 (4–2)	24 – Rohde	7 – Lee	8 – Rohde	Schoenecker Arena (1,332); St. Paul, MN
January 12, 2023; 7:00 p.m.		at Kansas City	L 60–81	13–7 (4–3)	10 – 3 tied	6 – Lee	2 – 3 tied	Swinney Recreation Center (725); Kansas City, MO
January 14, 2023; 7:00 p.m.		at Oral Roberts	L 69–81	13–8 (4–4)	23 – Bjorklund	6 – Bjorklund	5 – Rohde	Mabee Center (5,684); Tulsa, OK
January 21, 2023; 2:00 p.m.		at Western Illinois	L 56–60	13–9 (4–5)	19 – Rohde	4 – 3 tied	3 – Rohde	Western Hall (727); Macomb, IL
January 26, 2023; 7:00 p.m., Tommies All-Access		South Dakota State	W 60–54	14–9 (5–5)	15 – Rohde	9 – Allen	8 – Rohde	Schoenecker Arena (1,505); St. Paul, MN
January 28, 2023; 7:00 p.m., Tommies All-Access		South Dakota	L 67–81	14–10 (5–6)	26 – Bjorklund	8 – Bjorklund	3 – Miller	Schoenecker Arena (1,723); St. Paul, MN
February 2, 2023; 7:00 p.m.		at Omaha	W 89–83	15–10 (6–6)	23 – Miller	6 – 2 tied	4 – Rohde	Baxter Arena (1,261); Omaha, NE
February 4, 2023; 5:00 p.m.		at Denver	W 68–57	16–10 (7–6)	19 – Bjorklund	10 – Bjorklund	5 – Rohde	Hamilton Gymnasium (992); Denver, CO
February 9, 2023; 7:00 p.m., Tommies All-Access		Oral Roberts	L 88–95	16–11 (7–7)	25 – Rohde	5 – Allen	4 – 2 tied	Schoenecker Arena (2,013); St. Paul, MN
February 11, 2023; 7:00 p.m., Tommies All-Access		Kansas City	W 73–43	17–11 (8–7)	20 – Bjorklund	9 – Lee	2 – 5 tied	Schoenecker Arena (1,619); St. Paul, MN
February 18, 2023; 7:00 p.m., Tommies All-Access		Western Illinois	W 82–69	18–11 (9–7)	26 – Rohde	11 – Lee	5 – Rohde	Schoenecker Arena (1,674); St. Paul, MN
February 23, 2023; 7:00 p.m., ESPN+		at North Dakota State	L 64–73	18–12 (9–8)	20 – Rohde	5 – 3 tied	3 – 2 tied	Scheels Center (1,761); Fargo, ND
February 25, 2023; 1:00 p.m., ESPN3		at North Dakota	L 74–82	18–13 (9–9)	27 – Rohde	9 – Bjorklund	4 – Dufault	Betty Engelstad Sioux Center (1,715); Grand Forks, ND
Summit League tournament
March 5, 2023; 6:00 p.m., ESPN+	(5)	vs. (4) Western Illinois; Quarterfinals	W 67–60	19–13	25 – Bjorklund	10 – Bjorklund	3 – Rohde	Denny Sanford Premier Center; Sioux Falls, SD
March 6, 2023; 6:00 p.m., ESPN+	(5)	vs. (1) Oral Roberts; Semifinals	L 65–70	19–14	23 – Rohde	10 – Bjorklund	3 – Bjorklund	Denny Sanford Premier Center; Sioux Falls, SD
*Non-conference game. ^{#}Rankings from AP poll. (#) Tournament seedings in parentheses. All times are in Central.
