= 2022–23 Western Illinois Leathernecks men's basketball team =

American college basketball season

2022–23 Western Illinois Leathernecks men's basketball
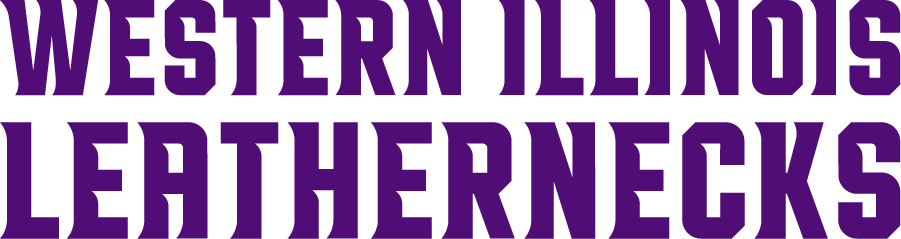
- Conference: Summit League
- Record: 16–14 (9–9 The Summit)
- Head coach: Rob Jeter (3rd season)
- Associate head coach: Chad Boudreau
- Assistant coaches: Kyle Heikkinen; Allan Hanson
- Home arena: Western Hall

2022–23 Summit League men's basketball standings
	Conf.				Overall
Team	W		L	PCT	W		L	PCT
Oral Roberts †	18	–	0	1.000	30	–	5	.857
South Dakota State	13	–	5	.722	19	–	13	.594
North Dakota State	11	–	7	.611	16	–	17	.485
Western Illinois	9	–	9	.500	16	–	14	.533
St. Thomas *	9	–	9	.500	19	–	14	.576
South Dakota	7	–	11	.389	12	–	19	.387
Kansas City	7	–	11	.389	11	–	21	.344
Denver	6	–	12	.333	15	–	17	.469
North Dakota	6	–	12	.333	13	–	20	.394
Omaha	4	–	14	.222	9	–	23	.281
† 2023 Summit League tournament winner * Ineligible for the 2023 NCAA tournament due to transition from Division III

The 2022–23 Western Illinois Leathernecks men's basketball team represented Western Illinois University in the 2022–23 NCAA Division I men's basketball season. The Leathernecks, led by third-year head coach Rob Jeter, played their home games at Western Hall in Macomb, Illinois as members of the Summit League. they finished the season 16–14, 9–9 in Summit League play, to finish in a tie for fourth place. As the No. 4 seed in the Summit League tournament, they lost to St. Thomas in the quarterfinals.

On April 12, 2023, head coach Rob Jeter left to take the head coaching position at Southern Utah. On April 13, the school named associate head coach Chad Boudreau the team's new head coach.

This was also the final season for the Leathernecks in the Summit League as Western Illinois moved to the Ohio Valley Conference as of the start of the 2023–24 season.

== Previous season ==
The Leathernecks finished the 2021–22 season 16–16, 7–11 in Summit League play, to finish in a tie for sixth place. In the Summit League tournament, they were defeated by Oral Roberts in the first round. They received an invitation to The Basketball Classic, where they lost to UTEP in the first round.

== Roster ==
2022–23 Western Illinois Leathernecks men's basketball team
Players
Coaches

Pos.	#	Name	Height	Weight	Year	Previous school	Hometown
G	1	Quinlan Bennett	6 ft 4 in (1.93 m)	190 lb (86 kg)	RS Jr	Lamar	Chicago, IL
G	2	Alec Rosner	6 ft 3 in (1.91 m)	—	Sr	Winona State	Appleton, WI
G	3	KJ Lee	6 ft 8 in (2.03 m)	170 lb (77 kg)	So	Fort Zumwalt North HS	O'Fallon, MO
F	4	Jesiah West	6 ft 5 in (1.96 m)	—	Jr	Southeastern CC	Elizabeth, NJ
G	5	Trenton Massner	6 ft 2 in (1.88 m)	175 lb (79 kg)	Sr	Northwestern State	Wapello, IA
G	10	JJ Kalakon	6 ft 5 in (1.96 m)	—	Jr	Triton College	Louisville, KY
G	11	De' Meiko Anderson	6 ft 0 in (1.83 m)	—	Fr	Minnesota North HS	Minneapolis, MN
C	12	Vuk Stevanic	6 ft 8 in (2.03 m)	228 lb (103 kg)	Sr	St. Francis Brooklyn	Jagodina, Serbia
G	13	Braden Lamar	6 ft 5 in (1.96 m)	190 lb (86 kg)	So	Bishop Gorman HS	Las Vegas, NV
F	15	Steph Gabriel	6 ft 7 in (2.01 m)	225 lb (102 kg)	Jr	Highland CC	Irvington, NJ
C	20	Cody Collinsworth	7 ft 1 in (2.16 m)	230 lb (104 kg)	Jr	Clarendon College	Lindale, TX
G	22	Robert IV Jeter	6 ft 0 in (1.83 m)	180 lb (82 kg)	So	East Ridge HS	Woodbury, MN
F	22	Elijah Farr	6 ft 8 in (2.03 m)	240 lb (109 kg)	Jr	Murray State	Kansas City, MO
G	25	Dirin Birhiray	6 ft 5 in (1.96 m)	—	Fr	Brebeuf Jesuit Prep	Indianapolis, IN
G	30	Jake Fisher	6 ft 3 in (1.91 m)	—	Fr	Oconomowoc HS	Oconomowoc, WI
G	40	Matthew Wade	6 ft 0 in (1.83 m)	160 lb (73 kg)	So	Golda Meir School	Milwaukee, WI

Head coach

- Rob Jeter (UW–Platteville)

Assistant coach(es)

- Chad Boudreau (Hannibal–LaGrange)
- Kyle Heikkinen (UW–Whitewater)
- Allan Hanson (Milwaukee)

Legend

- (C) Team captain
- (S) Suspended
- (I) Ineligible
- (W) Walk-on
- Injured
- Current redshirt

Roster
Last update: December 23, 2022

== Schedule and results ==
Date time, TV	Rank^{#}	Opponent^{#}	Result	Record	Site (attendance) city, state
Exhibition
November 1, 2022*; 7:30 p.m.		Monmouth College	W 89–61	–	Western Hall (432); Macomb, IL
Non-conference regular season
November 7, 2022*; 7:00 p.m., ESPN3		at Illinois State	W 71–68	1–0	CEFCU Arena (4,133); Normal, IL
November 9, 2022*; 6:00 p.m.		Rockford	W 113–56	2–0	Western Hall (641); Macomb, IL
November 11, 2022*; 9:00 p.m., FS2		at DePaul; Bahamas Championship campus-site game	L 74–86	2–1	Wintrust Arena (2,977); Chicago, IL
November 14, 2022*; 6:00 p.m., ESPN+		at UCF	L 37–70	2–2	Addition Financial Arena (3,940); Orlando, FL
November 21, 2022*; 5:00 p.m., LHN/ESPN+		at Texas–Rio Grande Valley	L 77–78	2–3	Bert Ogden Arena (6,674); Edinburg, TX
November 26, 2022*; 2:00 p.m.		Youngstown State	L 64–88	2–4	Western Hall (431); Macomb, IL
November 30, 2022*; 7:30 p.m.		Southern Indiana	W 86–78	3–4	Western Hall (493); Macomb, IL
December 3, 2022*; 2:30 p.m., ESPN+		Texas–Rio Grande Valley	W 90–72	4–4	Western Hall (603); Macomb, IL
December 7, 2022*; 6:00 p.m.		Iowa Wesleyan	W 84–73	5–4	Western Hall (391); Macomb, IL
December 10, 2022*; 2:00 p.m., ESPN+		at Eastern Illinois	W 79–75	6–4	Lantz Arena (1,137); Charleston, IL
December 16, 2022*; 7:30 p.m.		Eureka College	W 79–50	7–4	Vibrant Arena at The MARK; Moline, IL
Summit League regular season
December 19, 2022; 6:00 p.m.		North Dakota State	W 79–60	8–4 (1–0)	Western Hall (522); Macomb, IL
December 21, 2022; 12:00 p.m.		North Dakota	Postponed due to Winter Storm Elliott		Western Hall; Macomb, IL
December 29, 2022; 7:00 p.m., ESPN+		at South Dakota State	L 64–71	8–5 (1–1)	Frost Arena (1,701); Brookings, SD
December 31, 2022; 1:00 p.m.		at South Dakota	L 63–80	8–6 (1–2)	Sanford Coyote Sports Center (1,567); Vermillion, SD
January 5, 2023; 6:00 p.m.		Omaha	L 74–78	8–7 (1–3)	Western Hall (354); Macomb, IL
January 7, 2023; 2:00 p.m.		Denver	W 91–74	9–7 (2–3)	Western Hall (508); Macomb, IL
January 12, 2023; 7:00 p.m.		at Oral Roberts	L 63–87	9–8 (2–4)	Mabee Center (5,183); Tulsa, OK
January 14, 2023; 7:00 p.m.		at Kansas City	W 60–52	10–8 (3–4)	Swinney Recreation Center (927); Kansas City, MO
January 21, 2023; 2:00 p.m.		St. Thomas	W 60–56	11–8 (4–4)	Western Hall (727); Macomb, IL
January 23, 2023; 6:00 p.m.		North Dakota; Rescheduled from December 21	W 92–80	12–8 (5–4)	Western Hall (761); Macomb, IL
January 26, 2023; 6:00 p.m.		South Dakota	W 75–72	13–8 (6–4)	Western Hall (937); Macomb, IL
January 28, 2023; 2:00 p.m.		South Dakota State	W 81–73 ^{OT}	14–8 (7–4)	Western Hall (1,534); Macomb, IL
February 2, 2023; 8:00 p.m.		at Denver	L 44–77	14–9 (7–5)	Hamilton Gymnasium (689); Denver, CO
February 4, 2023; 2:05 p.m.		at Omaha	W 75–72	15–9 (8–5)	Baxter Arena (1,898); Omaha, NE
February 9, 2023; 6:00 p.m.		Kansas City	L 64–76	15–10 (8–6)	Western Hall (884); Macomb, IL
February 11, 2023; 2:00 p.m.		Oral Roberts	L 73–82	15–11 (8–7)	Western Hall (1,681); Macomb, IL
February 18, 2023; 7:00 p.m.		at St. Thomas	L 69–82	15–12 (8–8)	Schoenecker Arena (1,674); Saint Paul, MN
February 23, 2023; 11:00 a.m., ESPN+		at North Dakota	W 81–70	16–12 (9–8)	Betty Engelstad Sioux Center (1,271); Grand Forks, ND
February 25, 2023; 1:00 p.m., ESPN+		at North Dakota State	L 69–71	16–13 (9–9)	Scheels Center (2,602); Fargo, ND
Summit League tournament
March 5, 2023; 6:00 p.m., ESPN+	(4)	vs. (5) St. Thomas; Quarterfinals	L 60–67	16–14	Denny Sanford Premier Center; Sioux Falls, SD
*Non-conference game. ^{#}Rankings from AP poll. (#) Tournament seedings in parentheses. All times are in Central.
