= 2023 Summit League men's basketball tournament =

American collegiate basketball postseason

- Classification: Division I
- Season: 2022–23
- Teams: 10
- Site: Denny Sanford Premier Center; Sioux Falls, South Dakota
- Champions: Oral Roberts (5th title)
- Winning coach: Paul Mills (2nd title)
- MVP: Max Abmas (Oral Roberts)
- Television: MidcoSN, ESPN+, ESPN2

2022–23 Summit League men's basketball standings
	Conf.				Overall
Team	W		L	PCT	W		L	PCT
Oral Roberts †	18	–	0	1.000	30	–	5	.857
South Dakota State	13	–	5	.722	19	–	13	.594
North Dakota State	11	–	7	.611	16	–	17	.485
Western Illinois	9	–	9	.500	16	–	14	.533
St. Thomas *	9	–	9	.500	19	–	14	.576
South Dakota	7	–	11	.389	12	–	19	.387
Kansas City	7	–	11	.389	11	–	21	.344
Denver	6	–	12	.333	15	–	17	.469
North Dakota	6	–	12	.333	13	–	20	.394
Omaha	4	–	14	.222	9	–	23	.281
* Ineligible for the 2023 NCAA tournament due to transition from Division III
† 2023 Summit League tournament winner

The 2023 Summit League men's basketball Tournament was the postseason men's basketball tournament for the Summit League for the 2022-23 season. All tournament games were played at the Denny Sanford Premier Center in Sioux Falls, South Dakota, from March 3-7, 2023.

== Seeds ==
All ten conference teams participated in the tournament following a change announced before the season began. This was the first year that St. Thomas participated in a Division I conference tournament in any sport. Teams were seeded by record within the conference, with a tiebreaker system to seed teams with identical conference records. The tiebreakers operated in the following order:

1. Head-to-head record
2. Record against the top-seeded team not involved in the tie, going down through the standings until the tie is broken

If a team that is not eligible for the NCAA Tournament wins the Summit League Tournament, the conference's automatic bid goes to the highest seeded postseason eligible team.

Seed	School	Conf. record	Tiebreaker(s)
1	Oral Roberts	18–0	
2	South Dakota State	13–5	
3	North Dakota State	11–7	
4	Western Illinois	9–9	1–1 vs. South Dakota
5	St. Thomas	9–9	0–2 vs. South Dakota
6	South Dakota	7–11	2–0 vs. St. Thomas
7	Kansas City	7–11	1–1 vs. St. Thomas
8	Denver	6–12	1–1 vs. Western Illinois
9	North Dakota	6–12	0–2 vs. Western Illinois
10	Omaha	4–14	

== Schedule and results ==
Game	Time	Matchup	Score	Television
First Round - Friday, March 3
1	6:00 pm	No. 8 Denver vs. No. 9 North Dakota	83–68	MidcoSN/ESPN+
2	8:30 pm	No. 7 Kansas City vs. No. 10 Omaha	73–61	MidcoSN/ESPN+
Quarterfinals – Saturday, March 4
3	6:00 pm	No. 1 Oral Roberts vs. No. 9 North Dakota	96–80	MidcoSN/ESPN+
4	8:30 pm	No. 2 South Dakota State vs. No. 10 Omaha	63–55	MidcoSN/ESPN+
Quarterfinals – Sunday, March 5
5	6:00 pm	No. 4 Western Illinois vs. No. 5 St. Thomas	67–60	MidcoSN/ESPN+
6	8:30 pm	No. 3 North Dakota State vs. No. 6 South Dakota	70–68	MidcoSN/ESPN+
Semifinals - Monday, March 6
7	6:00 pm	No. 1 Oral Roberts vs. No. 5 St. Thomas	70–65	MidcoSN/ESPN+
8	8:30 pm	No. 2 South Dakota State vs. No. 3 North Dakota State	89–79	MidcoSN/ESPN+
Final – Tuesday, March 7
9	8:00 pm	No. 1 Oral Roberts vs. No. 3 North Dakota State	92–58	ESPN2
*Game times in CST. Rankings denote tournament seed. Reference:

== Bracket ==
First Round; March 3 ESPN+
8	Denver	68
9	North Dakota	83
7	Kansas City	61
10	Omaha	73

Quarterfinals; March 4 & 5 ESPN+
1	Oral Roberts	96
9	North Dakota	80
4	Western Illinois	60
5	St. Thomas	67
2	South Dakota State	63
10	Omaha	55
3	North Dakota State	70
6	South Dakota	68

Semifinals; March 6 ESPN+
1	Oral Roberts	70
5	St. Thomas	65
2	South Dakota State	79
3	North Dakota State	89

Final; March 7 ESPN2
1	Oral Roberts	92
3	North Dakota State	58

== All-Tournament Team ==
The following players were named to the All-Tournament team:

Player	School
Max Abmas (MVP)	Oral Roberts
Connor Vanover	Oral Roberts
Grant Nelson	North Dakota State
Boden Skunberg	North Dakota State
Andrew Rohde	St. Thomas
