= 2022–23 Kansas City Roos men's basketball team =

American college basketball season

2022–23 Kansas City Roos men's basketball
- Conference: The Summit League
- Record: 11–21 (7–11 The Summit)
- Head coach: Marvin Menzies (1st season)
- Associate head coach: Joe Esposito (1st season)
- Assistant coaches: Michael Bowden (1st season); Aerick Sanders (1st season)
- Home arena: Swinney Recreation Center

2022–23 Summit League men's basketball standings
	Conf.				Overall
Team	W		L	PCT	W		L	PCT
Oral Roberts †	18	–	0	1.000	30	–	5	.857
South Dakota State	13	–	5	.722	19	–	13	.594
North Dakota State	11	–	7	.611	16	–	17	.485
Western Illinois	9	–	9	.500	16	–	14	.533
St. Thomas *	9	–	9	.500	19	–	14	.576
South Dakota	7	–	11	.389	12	–	19	.387
Kansas City	7	–	11	.389	11	–	21	.344
Denver	6	–	12	.333	15	–	17	.469
North Dakota	6	–	12	.333	13	–	20	.394
Omaha	4	–	14	.222	9	–	23	.281
† 2023 Summit League tournament winner * Ineligible for the 2023 NCAA tournament due to transition from Division III

The 2022–23 Kansas City Roos men's basketball team represented the University of Missouri–Kansas City during the 2022–23 NCAA Division I men's basketball season. The Roos, led by first-year head coach Marvin Menzies, played their home games on-campus at Swinney Recreation Center in Kansas City, Missouri as a member of The Summit League (The Summit).

The Roos finished the season 11–21 overall, 7–11 in The Summit to finish in a tie for sixth place. As the seventh seed, they were defeated by the University of Nebraska Omaha in The Summit tournament first round.

== Previous season ==
The Kangaroos finished the 2021–22 season with a record of 19–12 overall, 12–6 in The Summit to finish in a tie for third place.

Head Coach Billy Donlon stepped down on April 21, 2022 to "pursue other opportunities", ending his three-year tenure at the helm. Four days later, Donlon was announced as the associate head coach at Clemson University. The next day, Marvin Menzies was hired as head coach for the University of Missouri Kansas City. Menzies was familiar with the Kansas City program, having coached against them during their days as a member of the Western Athletic Conference (WAC) (both as a head coach at New Mexico State University and an associate head coach at Grand Canyon University).

== Roster ==
2022–23 Kansas City Roos men's basketball team
Players
Coaches

Pos.	#	Name	Height	Weight	Year	Previous school	Hometown
G	21	RayQuawndis Mitchell	6 ft 5 in (1.96 m)	200 lb (91 kg)	GS	UIC/ Otero College/ Idaho; Blaine HS	Blaine, MN
G	5	Shemarri Allen	6 ft 4 in (1.93 m)	200 lb (91 kg)	Sr	Cowley; Believe Sports Academy/ T. C. Roberson HS/ Victory Christian Center	Arden, NC
G	11	Anderson Kopp	6 ft 5 in (1.96 m)	190 lb (86 kg)	Sr	Lamar; St. Thomas HS	Houston, TX
G	1	Sam Martin	6 ft 0 in (1.83 m)	185 lb (84 kg)	RS Jr	Burleson HS	Houston, TX
G	2	Babacar Diallo	6 ft 6 in (1.98 m)	197 lb (89 kg)	Jr	Navarro/ Saint Peter's; The Patrick	Dakar, Senegal
G	0	Timothy Barnes	6 ft 3 in (1.91 m)	185 lb (84 kg)	So	Gray Collegiate Academy	West Columbia, SC
F	23	Allen David Mukeba, Jr.	6 ft 7 in (2.01 m)	235 lb (107 kg)	So	Colby CC; Golden State Prep/ Napa Christian HS	Charleroi, Belgium
G	25	Tyler Andrews	6 ft 6 in (1.98 m)	—	Fr	Kimball Union	Cedar Rapids, IA
G	13	Jaylen Carter	6 ft 5 in (1.96 m)	—	Fr	Manual Arts HS	Carson, CA
C	15	Sidy Diallo	7 ft 2 in (2.18 m)	—	Fr	St. Paul HS	Dakar, Senegal
G	4	Emmanouil Dimou	6 ft 4 in (1.93 m)	—	Fr	Third General Lyceum	Athens, Greece
G	14	Cole Glasgow	6 ft 2 in (1.88 m)	175 lb (79 kg)	Fr	Dallas Center–Grimes Community HS	Grimes, IA
F	10	Precious C. Idiaru	6 ft 9 in (2.06 m)	—	Fr	Los Angeles Premier Prep	Speyer, Germany
F	12	Promise C. Idiaru	6 ft 9 in (2.06 m)	—	Fr	Los Angeles Premier Prep	Speyer, Germany
G/F	3	Logan Mukeba (redshirt)	6 ft 5 in (1.96 m)	—	Fr	Lee	Charleroi, Belgium
F	32	Jeff Ngandu	6 ft 9 in (2.06 m)	220 lb (100 kg)	Fr	Seton Hall; Orangeville Prep Basketball/ Burley HS	Lubumbashi, Congo
G	24	Abdullah Olajuwon	6 ft 4 in (1.93 m)	—	Fr	William P. Clements HS	Houston, TX
G	33	Jevin Sullivan	6 ft 5 in (1.96 m)	—	Fr	North Polk HS	Elkhart, IA

Head coach

- Marvin Menzies (UCLA)

Assistant coach(es)

- Joe Esposito (Marist)
- Michael Bowden (Florida)
- Aerick Sanders (San Diego State)

Legend

- (C) Team captain
- (S) Suspended
- (I) Ineligible
- (W) Walk-on
- (5Y) Fifth-year Senior
- Injured
- Current redshirt

Roster
Last update: November 3, 2024

== Schedule & Results ==
Date time, TV	Rank^{#}	Opponent^{#}	Result	Record	High points	High rebounds	High assists	Site (attendance) city, state
Exhibition Season
November 2, 2022*; 7:00 PM		Langston	W 78–63		25 – Kopp	7 – Andrews	5 – Allen	Swinney Recreation Center (640); Kansas City, MO
Non–League Regular Season
November 7, 2022*; 7:00 PM		Lincoln (Missouri)	L 56–59	0–1	14 – Allen	12 – Mukeba, Jr.	4 – Allen	Swinney Recreation Center (722); Kansas City, MO
November 9, 2022*; 7:00 PM, ESPN+		at LSU	L 63–74	0–2	19 – Allen	10 – Pro. Idiaru	5 – Mitchell	Pete Maravich Assembly Center (9,338); Baton Rouge, LA
November 11, 2022*; 8:00 PM, BTN		at No. 23 Illinois	L 48–86	0–3	20 – Allen	10 – Ngandu	3 – Pre. Idiaru	State Farm Center (15,331); Champaign, IL
November 14, 2022*; 7:00 PM		Calvary	W 113–54	1–3	18 – Mitchell	11 – Mukeba, Jr.	8 – Mukeba, Jr.	Swinney Recreation Center (582); Kansas City, MO
November 17, 2022*; 5:30 PM, ESPN+		at Kansas State	L 53–69	1–4	21 – Allen	8 – Allen, Mukeba, Jr.	5 – Kopp	Fred Bramlage Coliseum (7,376); Manhattan, KS
November 21, 2022*; 10:00 AM, FloHoops		vs. Toledo; Gulf Coast Showcase [Quarterfinal]	W 83–71	2–4	35 – Mitchell	9 – Mukeba, Jr.	3 – Allen, Kopp, Mukeba, Jr.	Hertz Arena (467); Estero, FL
November 22, 2022*; 4:00 PM, FloHoops		vs. Indiana State; Gulf Coast Showcase [Semifinal]	W 63–61	3–4	22 – Allen	9 – Mukeba, Jr.	2 – Mitchell	Hertz Arena (356); Estero, FL
November 23, 2022*; 6:30 PM, FloHoops		at Florida Gulf Coast; Gulf Coast Showcase [Final]	L 59–73	3–5	29 – Mitchell	14 – Mukeba, Jr.	2 – Dimou	Hertz Arena (1,010); Estero, FL
November 26, 2022*; 7:00 PM		SIUE	L 54–64	3–6	15 – Mukeba, Jr.	8 – Allen, Mukeba, Jr., Ngandu	2 – Allen	Swinney Recreation Center (735); Kansas City, MO
November 29, 2022*; 7:00 PM		Idaho State	L 65–75	3–7	18 – Mitchell	7 – Mitchell, Mukeba, Jr.	3 – Allen, Mukeba, Jr.	Swinney Recreation Center (823); Kansas City, MO
December 3, 2022*; 7:00 PM		Lindenwood	W 61–47	4–7	27 – Mitchell	12 – Mukeba, Jr.	4 – Allen	Swinney Recreation Center (723); Kansas City, MO
December 6, 2022*; 7:00 PM, ESPN+		at Oklahoma	L 53–75	4–8	18 – Mitchell	5 – Mukeba, Jr., Pro. Idiaru	2 – Allen, B. Diallo	Lloyd Noble Center (4,863); Norman, OK
December 10, 2022*; 7:00 PM, ESPN+		at Green Bay	L 64–70	4–9	28 – Allen	8 – B. Diallo	3 – Allen	Resch Center (1,625); Ashwaubenon, WI
League Regular Season
December 19, 2022; 7:00 PM		South Dakota	W 62–45	5–9 (1–0)	28 – Mitchell	8 – Mukeba, Jr.	2 – Mukeba, Jr.	Swinney Recreation Center (803); Kansas City, MO
December 21, 2022; 7:00 PM		South Dakota State (Rescheduled to January 30, 2023)	Postponed (Winter Storm Elliott)					Swinney Recreation Center; Kansas City, MO
December 29, 2022; 8:00 PM		at Denver	L 83–85 ^{3OT}	5–10 (1–1)	34 – Allen	6 – Allen, Mukeba, Jr. Ngandu	6 – Mitchell	Hamilton Gymnasium (1,021); Denver, CO
December 31, 2022; 1:00 PM		at Omaha	W 75–59	6–10 (2–1)	27 – Mitchell	7 – Ngandu	4 – Allen	Baxter Arena (1,686); Omaha, NE
January 7, 2023; 7:00 PM		at Oral Roberts	L 71–74	6–11 (2–2)	23 – Mitchell	8 – Mukeba, Jr.	4 – Allen	Mabee Center (6,011); Tulsa, OK
January 12, 2023; 7:00 PM		St. Thomas	W 81–60	7–11 (3–2)	29 – Mitchell	17 – Ngandu	5 – Allen	Swinney Recreation Center (725); Kansas City, MO
January 14, 2023; 7:00 PM		Western Illinois	L 52–60	7–12 (3–3)	17 – Mitchell	17 – Ngandu	3 – Mitchell	Swinney Recreation Center (927); Kansas City, MO
January 19, 2023; 7:00 PM, ESPN+		at North Dakota	L 60–77	7–13 (3–4)	17 – Mitchell, Allen	7 – Allen	6 – Allen	Betty Engelstad Sioux Center (1,510); Grand Forks, ND
January 21, 2023; 1:00 PM, ESPN+		at North Dakota State	W 75–73	8–13 (4–4)	28 – Allen	6 – Ngandu	7 – Allen	Scheels Center (1,954); Fargo, ND
January 26, 2023; 7:00 PM		Omaha	W 64–61	9–13 (5–4)	20 – Allen	8 – Pro. Idiaru	3 – Pro. Idiaru	Swinney Recreation Center (1,012); Kansas City, MO
January 28, 2023; 7:00 PM		Denver	W 70–60	10–13 (6–4)	23 – Allen	9 – Allen	5 – Allen	Swinney Recreation Center (1,221); Kansas City, MO
January 30, 2023; 7:00 PM		South Dakota State (Rescheduled from December 21, 2022)	L 66–67	10–14 (6–5)	23 – Allen	10 – Mukeba, Jr.	5 – Allen	Swinney Recreation Center (842); Kansas City, MO
February 4, 2023; 7:00 PM		Oral Roberts	L 57–85	10–15 (6–6)	16 – Allen	6 – Allen	3 – Mitchell	Swinney Recreation Center (1,523); Kansas City, MO
February 9, 2023; 6:00 PM, ESPN+		at Western Illinois	W 76–64	11–15 (7–6)	26 – Allen	8 – B. Diallo	4 – Allen	Western Hall (884); Macomb, IL
February 11, 2023; 7:00 PM		at St. Thomas	L 43–73	11–16 (7–7)	11 – Mitchell	6 – Mitchell	2 – B. Diallo	Schoenecker Arena (1,619); St. Paul, MN
February 16, 2023; 7:00 PM		North Dakota State	L 58–69	11–17 (7–8)	18 – Mitchell	7 – Allen, B. Diallo, Ngandu	4 – Mitchell	Swinney Recreation Center (938); Kansas City, MO
February 18, 2023; 7:00 PM		North Dakota	L 73–81	11–18 (7–9)	20 – Mitchell	11 – Pro. Idiaru	2 – B. Diallo	Swinney Recreation Center (1,532); Kansas City, MO
February 23, 2023; 7:00 PM, ESPN+		at South Dakota State	L 50–73	11–19 (7–10)	13 – Mitchell	7 – B. Diallo	3 – B. Diallo	Frost Arena (1,523); Brookings, SD
February 25, 2023; 7:00 PM, ESPN3		at South Dakota	L 48–82	11–20 (7–11)	13 – Mitchell	9 – Ngandu	2 – Mitchell	Sanford Coyote Sports Center (2,080); Vermillion, SD
League Tournament
March 3, 2023*; 8:30 PM, MidCo Sports/ ESPN+	(7)	vs. (10) Omaha [First Round]	L 61–73	11–21	20 – Andrews	11 – Andrews	4 – B. Diallo	Denny Sanford Premier Center (3,818); Sioux Falls, SD
*Non-conference game. ^{#}Rankings from AP Poll. (#) Tournament seedings in parentheses. All times are in Central Standard Time (CST).
