= 2022–23 South Dakota State Jackrabbits men's basketball team =

American college basketball season

2022–23 South Dakota State Jackrabbits men's basketball
- Conference: Summit League
- Record: 19–13 (13–5 The Summit)
- Head coach: Eric Henderson (4th season)
- Associate head coach: Rob Klinkefus
- Assistant coaches: Bryan Petersen; Khyle Marshall
- Home arena: Frost Arena

2022–23 Summit League men's basketball standings
	Conf.				Overall
Team	W		L	PCT	W		L	PCT
Oral Roberts †	18	–	0	1.000	30	–	5	.857
South Dakota State	13	–	5	.722	19	–	13	.594
North Dakota State	11	–	7	.611	16	–	17	.485
Western Illinois	9	–	9	.500	16	–	14	.533
St. Thomas *	9	–	9	.500	19	–	14	.576
South Dakota	7	–	11	.389	12	–	19	.387
Kansas City	7	–	11	.389	11	–	21	.344
Denver	6	–	12	.333	15	–	17	.469
North Dakota	6	–	12	.333	13	–	20	.394
Omaha	4	–	14	.222	9	–	23	.281
† 2023 Summit League tournament winner * Ineligible for the 2023 NCAA tournament due to transition from Division III

The 2022–23 South Dakota State Jackrabbits men's basketball team represented South Dakota State University in the 2022–23 NCAA Division I men's basketball season. The Jackrabbits, led by fourth-year head coach Eric Henderson, played their home games at Frost Arena in Brookings, South Dakota, as members of the Summit League. They finished the season 19–13, 13–5 in Summit League play to finish in second place. They defeated Omaha in the quarterfinals of the Summit League tournament before losing to North Dakota State in the semifinals.

== Previous season ==
The Jackrabbits finished the 2021–22 season 30–5, 18–0 in Summit League play to win the regular season championship. They defeated Omaha, South Dakota, and North Dakota State to win the Summit League tournament championship. As a result, the Jackrabbits received the conference's automatic bid to the NCAA Tournament as the No. 13 seed in the Midwest region. There they lost to Providence in the first round.

== Offseason ==
=== Departures ===
Name	Number	Pos.	Height	Weight	Year	Hometown	Reason for departure
Jaylon Gentry	0	G	5'9"	175	Junior	Brown Deer, WI	Left team
Baylor Scheierman	3	G	6'6"	205	Junior	Aurora, NE	Transferred to Creighton
David Wingett	10	G/F	6'7"	210	RS-Junior	Winnebago, NE	Transferred to Peru State College
Noah Freidel	15	G	6'4"	200	Junior	Tea, SD	Transferred to James Madison
Douglas Wilson	35	F	6'7"	220	Graduate Student	Des Moines, IA	Graduated

=== Incoming transfers ===
Name	Number	Pos.	Height	Weight	Year	Hometown	Previous School
Matthew Mors	11	F	6'7"	230	RS-Freshman	Yankton, SD	Wisconsin

=== 2022 recruiting class ===
College recruiting information
Name	Hometown	School	Height	Weight	Commit date
Kalen Garry; G	De Smet, SD	De Smet High School	6 ft 3 in (1.91 m)	200 lb (91 kg)	Nov 26, 2021
Kalen Garry; G	Recruit ratings: Scout: Rivals: 247Sports: (NR)				
Tanner Te Slaa; G	Hull, IA	Boyden–Hull High School	6 ft 4 in (1.93 m)	170 lb (77 kg)	Nov 19, 2021
Tanner Te Slaa; G	Recruit ratings: Scout: Rivals: 247Sports: (NR)				
Jack Hastreiter; G	Lincoln, NE	Pius X High School	6 ft 7 in (2.01 m)	210 lb (95 kg)	Oct 7, 2021
Jack Hastreiter; G	Recruit ratings: Scout: Rivals: 247Sports: (NR)				
William Kyle III; F	Bellevue NE	Bellevue West High School	6 ft 9 in (2.06 m)	215 lb (98 kg)	Oct 4, 2021
William Kyle III; F	Recruit ratings: Scout: Rivals: 247Sports: (NR)				
Overall recruit ranking:
Note: In many cases, Scout, Rivals, 247Sports, On3, and ESPN may conflict in their listings of height and weight.; In these cases, the average was taken. ESPN grades are on a 100-point scale.; Sources: "2022 Team Ranking". Rivals.

== Roster ==
2022–23 South Dakota State Jackrabbits men's basketball team
Players
Coaches

Pos.	#	Name	Height	Weight	Year	Previous school	Hometown
G	1	Matt Mims	6 ft 0 in (1.83 m)	175 lb (79 kg)	Jr	Xavier High School	Cedar Rapids, IA
G	2	Zeke Mayo	6 ft 3 in (1.91 m)	179 lb (81 kg)	So	Lawrence High School	Lawrence, KS
G	10	Kalen Garry	6 ft 3 in (1.91 m)	200 lb (91 kg)	Fr	De Smet High School	De Smet, SD
F	11	Matthew Mors	6 ft 7 in (2.01 m)	230 lb (104 kg)	RS Fr	Yankton High School; Wisconsin	Yankton, SD
F	13	Luke Appel	6 ft 8 in (2.03 m)	245 lb (111 kg)	Sr	Marshalltown High School; Kirkwood CC	Marshalltown, IA
G	15	Tanner Te Slaa	6 ft 5 in (1.96 m)	195 lb (88 kg)	Fr	Boyden–Hull High School	Hull, IA
F	22	Aaron Fiegen	6 ft 7 in (2.01 m)	205 lb (93 kg)	Jr	Madison High School	Madison, SD
G	23	Jack Hastreiter	6 ft 7 in (2.01 m)	210 lb (95 kg)	Fr	Pius X High School	Lincoln, NE
G	30	Charlie Easley	6 ft 2 in (1.88 m)	185 lb (84 kg)	Jr	Pius X High School; Nebraska	Lincoln, NE
F	32	Matt Dentlinger	6 ft 8 in (2.03 m)	240 lb (109 kg)	Sr	Kuemper Catholic High School	Arcadia, IA
F	33	Broden Lien	6 ft 8 in (2.03 m)	235 lb (107 kg)	RS Fr	Andrews Osborne Academy	Flom, MN
G	34	Alex Arians	6 ft 4 in (1.93 m)	200 lb (91 kg)	Sr	Edgewood High School	Madison, WI
F	42	William Kyle III	6 ft 9 in (2.06 m)	215 lb (98 kg)	Fr	Bellevue West High School	Bellevue, NE

Head coach

- Eric Henderson (Wayne State (NE))

Assistant coach(es)

- Rob Klinkefus (Buena Vista)
- Bryan Petersen (Iowa State)
- Khyle Marshall (Butler)

Legend

- (C) Team captain
- (S) Suspended
- (I) Ineligible
- (W) Walk-on
- Injured
- Current redshirt

Roster
Last update: November 4, 2022

== Schedule and results ==
Date time, TV	Rank^{#}	Opponent^{#}	Result	Record	Site (attendance) city, state
Exhibition
November 2, 2022*; 8:30 pm		Concordia–St. Paul	W 123–61	–	Frost Arena; Brookings, SD
Non-conference regular season
November 7, 2022*; 6:00 pm, ESPN+		at Akron	L 80–81 ^{OT}	0–1	James A. Rhodes Arena (2,157); Akron, OH
November 9, 2022*; 8:00 pm		at Boise State	W 68–66	1–1	ExtraMile Arena (9,796); Boise, ID
November 15, 2022*; 7:00 pm, MidcoSN/ESPN+		vs. St. Bonaventure	W 66–62	2–1	Sanford Pentagon (3,093); Sioux Falls, SD
November 16, 2022*; 7:00 pm, SECN+		at No. 9 Arkansas	L 56–71	2–2	Bud Walton Arena (19,200); Fayetteville, AR
November 19, 2022*; 6:00 pm		Stephen F. Austin	L 82–93	2–3	Frost Arena (2,171); Brookings, SD
November 25, 2022*; 12:30 pm		vs. Valparaiso; Hostilo Community Classic	W 61–50	3–3	Enmarket Arena (274); Savannah, GA
November 26, 2022*; 11:00 am		vs. James Madison; Hostilo Community Classic	L 60–79	3–4	Enmarket Arena (276); Savannah, GA
December 2, 2022*; 6:00 pm, ESPN3		at Kent State	L 68–83	3–5	MAC Center (1,244); Kent, OH
December 3, 2022*; 7:30 pm, SECN+		at No. 11 Alabama	L 65–78	3–6	Coleman Coliseum (9,086); Tuscaloosa, AL
December 6, 2022*; 8:00 pm, ESPN+		at Montana	L 56–81	3–7	Dahlberg Arena (1,502); Missoula, MT
December 10, 2022*; 4:00 p.m., MidcoSN2		Eastern Washington	W 77–76	4–7	Frost Arena (1,647); Brookings, SD
December 12, 2022*; 8:15 pm, MidcoSN		Mount Marty	W 85–56	5–7	Frost Arena (743); Brookings, SD
December 14, 2022*; 7:00 pm		Bellevue	Postponed due to weather conditions		Frost Arena; Brookings, SD
Summit League regular season
December 19, 2022; 7:00 pm		at Oral Roberts	L 40–79	5–8 (0–1)	Mabee Center (4,579); Tulsa, OK
December 29, 2022; 7:00 pm, MidcoSN		Western Illinois	W 71–64	6–8 (1–1)	Frost Arena (1,701); Brookings, SD
December 31, 2022; 2:00 pm, MidcoSN2		St. Thomas	W 71–64	7–8 (2–1)	Frost Arena (2,020); Brookings, SD
January 5, 2023; 7:00 pm, ESPN+		at North Dakota State	L 59–65	7–9 (2–2)	Scheels Center (1,653); Fargo, ND
January 7, 2023; 1:00 pm, MidcoSN		at North Dakota	W 60–59	8–9 (3–2)	Betty Engelstad Sioux Center (1,487); Grand Forks, ND
January 14, 2023; 6:00 pm, MidcoSN		at South Dakota	W 82–64	9–9 (4–2)	Sanford Coyote Sports Center (4,605); Vermillion, SD
January 19, 2023; 7:00 pm		Omaha	W 84–61	10–9 (5–2)	Frost Arena (1,939); Brookings, SD
January 21, 2023; 2:00 pm, MidcoSN2		Denver; Pork Classic	W 76–61	11–9 (6–2)	Frost Arena (2,317); Brookings, SD
January 26, 2023; 7:00 pm		at St. Thomas	L 54–60	11–10 (6–3)	Schoenecker Arena (1,505); St. Paul, MN
January 28, 2023; 2:00 pm		at Western Illinois	L 73–81 ^{OT}	11–11 (6–4)	Western Hall (1,534); Macomb, IL
January 30, 2023; 7:00 pm		at Kansas City; Rescheduled from December 21	W 67–66	12–11 (7–4)	Swinney Recreation Center (842); Kansas City, MO
February 2, 2023; 7:00 pm		North Dakota	W 96–73	13–11 (8–4)	Frost Arena (1,744); Brookings, SD
February 4, 2023; 2:00 pm, MidcoSN2		North Dakota State	W 90–85	14–11 (9–4)	Frost Arena (3,031); Brookings, SD
February 11, 2023; 6:00 pm, MidcoSN		South Dakota; South Dakota Showdown Series	W 72–67	15–11 (10–4)	Frost Arena (4,421); Brookings, SD
February 16, 2023; 8:00 pm		at Denver	W 80–75	16–11 (11–4)	Hamilton Gymnasium (917); Denver, CO
February 18, 2023; 7:00 pm		at Omaha	W 91–70	17–11 (12–4)	Baxter Arena (3,242); Omaha, NE
February 23, 2023; 7:00 pm, MidcoSN2		Kansas City; Military Appreciation	W 73–50	18–11 (13–4)	Frost Arena (1,523); Brookings, SD
February 25, 2023; 2:00 pm, MidcoSN2		Oral Roberts; Senior Day	L 65–69	18–12 (13–5)	Frost Arena; Brookings, SD
Summit League tournament
March 4, 2023; 8:30 pm, MidcoSN/ESPN+	(2)	vs. (10) Omaha; Quarterfinals	W 63–55	19–12	Denny Sanford Premier Center; Sioux Falls, SD
March 6, 2023; 8:30 pm, MidcoSN/ESPN+	(2)	vs. (3) North Dakota State; Semifinals	L 79–89	19–13	Denny Sanford Premier Center; Sioux Falls, SD
*Non-conference game. ^{#}Rankings from AP Poll. (#) Tournament seedings in parentheses. All times are in Central.
