= 2022–23 North Dakota Fighting Hawks men's basketball team =

American college basketball season

2022–23 North Dakota Fighting Hawks men's basketball
- Conference: Summit League
- Record: 13–20 (6–12 The Summit)
- Head coach: Paul Sather (4th season)
- Assistant coaches: Jamie Stevens; Randall Herbst; Steven Aldridge
- Home arena: Betty Engelstad Sioux Center

2022–23 Summit League men's basketball standings
	Conf.				Overall
Team	W		L	PCT	W		L	PCT
Oral Roberts †	18	–	0	1.000	30	–	5	.857
South Dakota State	13	–	5	.722	19	–	13	.594
North Dakota State	11	–	7	.611	16	–	17	.485
Western Illinois	9	–	9	.500	16	–	14	.533
St. Thomas *	9	–	9	.500	19	–	14	.576
South Dakota	7	–	11	.389	12	–	19	.387
Kansas City	7	–	11	.389	11	–	21	.344
Denver	6	–	12	.333	15	–	17	.469
North Dakota	6	–	12	.333	13	–	20	.394
Omaha	4	–	14	.222	9	–	23	.281
† 2023 Summit League tournament winner * Ineligible for the 2023 NCAA tournament due to transition from Division III

The 2022–23 North Dakota Fighting Hawks basketball team represented the University of North Dakota in the 2022–23 NCAA Division I men's basketball season. The Fighting Hawks were led by fourth-year head coach Paul Sather and played their home games at the Betty Engelstad Sioux Center in Grand Forks, North Dakota, as members of the Summit League.

== Previous season ==
In 2021–22, the Fighting Hawks finished with a record of 6–25 (2–16 Summit League play) and finished 10th place in the Summit League.

== Roster ==
2022–23 North Dakota Fighting Hawks men's basketball team
Players
Coaches

Pos.	#	Name	Height	Weight	Year	Hometown
G	0	Caleb Nero	6 ft 2 in (1.88 m)	180 lb (82 kg)	Sr	Tulsa, OK
G	1	Elijah Brooks	6 ft 4 in (1.93 m)	195 lb (88 kg)	Fr	Topeka, KS
G	2	Matt Norman	6 ft 4 in (1.93 m)	195 lb (88 kg)	Jr	Orem, UT
G	3	Reid Grant	6 ft 3 in (1.91 m)	185 lb (84 kg)	So	Johnston, IA
G	4	Jalun Trent	6 ft 4 in (1.93 m)	190 lb (86 kg)	Jr	Baltimore, MD
F	10	Tsotne Tsartsidze	6 ft 9 in (2.06 m)	235 lb (107 kg)	Jr	Tbilisi, Georgia
G	11	Daniel Hong	6 ft 2 in (1.88 m)	175 lb (79 kg)	Fr	South Barrington, IL
F	12	Brian Matthews	6 ft 9 in (2.06 m)	240 lb (109 kg)	So	Chicago, IL
G	15	Brady Danielson	6 ft 4 in (1.93 m)	205 lb (93 kg)	Sr	York, NE
F	20	B.J. Omot	6 ft 8 in (2.03 m)	175 lb (79 kg)	Fr	Mankato, MN
F	21	A'Jahni Levias	6 ft 6 in (1.98 m)	215 lb (98 kg)	Fr	Vallejo, CA
F	23	Brady Nicholson	6 ft 9 in (2.06 m)	230 lb (104 kg)	Fr	Chaska, MN
F	35	Mitchell Sueker	6 ft 9 in (2.06 m)	225 lb (102 kg)	Sr	Marshall, MN
G	52	Treysen Eaglestaff	6 ft 6 in (1.98 m)	190 lb (86 kg)	Fr	Bismarck, ND

Head coach

- Paul Sather

Assistant coach(es)

- Jamie Stevens
- Randall Herbst
- Steven Aldridge

Legend

- (C) Team captain
- (S) Suspended
- (I) Ineligible
- (W) Walk-on
- Injured
- Current redshirt

Roster
Last update: December 13, 2022

== Schedule and results ==
Date time, TV	Rank^{#}	Opponent^{#}	Result	Record	Site (attendance) city, state
Exhibition
October 31, 2022*; 7:00 p.m.		Waldorf	W 93–48	–	Betty Engelstad Sioux Center (1,146); Grand Forks, ND
Non-conference regular season
November 7, 2022*; 7:00 p.m.		Incarnate Word	W 65–57	1–0	McDermott Center (515); San Antonio, TX
November 10, 2022*; 8:00 p.m., Fox Sports 1		at No. 10 Creighton	L 61–96	1–1	CHI Health Center Omaha (16,594); Omaha, NE
November 15, 2022*; 7:00 p.m., MidcoSN		Pacific	L 63–93	1–2	Betty Engelstad Sioux Center (1,298); Grand Forks, ND
November 17, 2022*; 7:00 p.m., FloHoops		at Elon	W 77–73	2–2	Schar Center (1,738); Elon, NC
November 20, 2022*; 1:00 p.m., MidcoSN		Montana State	L 71–81	2–3	Betty Engelstad Sioux Center (1,225); Grand Forks, ND
November 22, 2022*; 7:00 p.m., Midco+		Wisconsin–Stout	W 92–61	3–3	Betty Engelstad Sioux Center (1,184); Grand Forks, ND
November 25, 2022*; 1:00 p.m., MidcoSN		Utah Tech	W 67–52	4–3	Betty Engelstad Sioux Center (1,248); Grand Forks, ND
November 27, 2022*; 1:00 p.m., MidcoSN		Cal State Fullerton	W 73–57	5–3	Betty Engelstad Sioux Center (1,199); Grand Forks, ND
November 30, 2022*; 7:00 p.m., ESPN+		at No. 23 Iowa State	L 44–63	5–4	Hilton Coliseum (12,467); Ames, IA
December 3, 2022*; 7:00 p.m.		at Portland	L 69–90	5–5	Chiles Center (1,128); Portland, OR
December 6, 2022*; 8:00 p.m., ESPN+		at Idaho	L 66–76	5–6	ICCU Arena (1,435); Moscow, ID
December 10, 2022*; 3:00 p.m., MidcoSN		Seattle	L 78–80 ^{OT}	5–7	Betty Engelstad Sioux Center (1,524); Grand Forks, ND
December 12, 2022*; 8:00 p.m.		North Central	W 99–48	6–7	Betty Engelstad Sioux Center (1,225); Grand Forks, ND
Summit League regular season
December 19, 2022; 7:00 p.m.		at St. Thomas	L 62–75	6–8 (0–1)	Schnoecker Arena (985); Saint Paul, MN
December 30, 2022; 3:00 p.m., MidcoSN/ESPN3		North Dakota State	L 49–71	6–9 (0–2)	Betty Engelstad Sioux Center (2,458); Grand Forks, ND
January 5, 2023; 7:00 p.m.		South Dakota	L 60–62	6–10 (0–3)	Betty Engelstad Sioux Center (1,206); Grand Forks, ND
January 7, 2023; 1:00 p.m.		South Dakota State	L 59–60	6–11 (0–4)	Betty Engelstead Sioux Center (1,487); Grand Forks, ND
January 12, 2023; 7:00 p.m.		at Omaha	L 63–69	6–12 (0–5)	Baxter Arena (2,091); Omaha, NE
January 14, 2023; 2:00 p.m.		at Denver	L 71–78	6–13 (0–6)	Magness Arena (790); Denver, CO
January 19, 2023; 7:00 p.m.		Kansas City	W 77–60	7–13 (1–6)	Betty Engelstad Sioux Center (1,510); Grand Forks, ND
January 21, 2023; 1:00 p.m.		Oral Roberts	L 72–84	7–14 (1–7)	Betty Engelstad Sioux Center (1,655); Grand Forks, ND
January 23, 2023; 6:00 p.m.		at Western Illinois	L 80–92	7–15 (1–8)	Western Hall (761); Macomb, IL
January 27, 2023; 7:00 p.m., ABC ND/ESPN+		at North Dakota State	L 75–91	7–16 (1–9)	Scheels Center (3,867); Fargo, ND
February 2, 2023; 7:00 p.m.		at South Dakota State	L 73–96	7–17 (1–10)	Frost Arena (1,744); Brookings, SD
February 4, 2023; 1:00 p.m.		at South Dakota	W 86–72	8–17 (2–10)	Sanford Coyote Sports Center (2,416); Vermillion, SD
February 9, 2023; 7:00 p.m., MidcoSN/ESPN+		Denver	W 86–63	9–17 (3–10)	Betty Engelstead Sioux Center (1,448); Grand Forks, ND
February 11, 2023; 1:00 p.m., MidcoSN2/ESPN+		Omaha	W 76–73 ^{OT}	10–17 (4–10)	Betty Engelstad Sioux Center (1,534); Grand Forks, ND
February 16, 2023; 7:00 p.m.		at Oral Roberts	L 70–73	10–18 (4–11)	Mabee Center (7,492); Tulsa, OK
February 18, 2023; 7:00 p.m.		at Kansas City	W 81–73	11–18 (5–11)	Swinney Recreation Center (1,532); Kansas City, MO
February 23, 2023; 11:00 a.m., MidcoSN/ESPN+		Western Illinois	L 70–81	11–19 (5–12)	Betty Engelstead Sioux Center (1,271); Grand Forks, ND
February 25, 2023; 1:00 p.m., MidcoSN2/ESPN+		St. Thomas	W 82–74	12–19 (6–12)	Betty Engelstead Sioux Center (1,715); Grand Forks, ND
Summit League tournament
March 3, 2023; 6:00 p.m., MidcoSN/ESPN+	(9)	vs. (8) Denver; First round	W 83–68	13–19	Denny Sanford Premier Center; Sioux Falls, SD
March 4, 2023; 6:00 p.m., MidcoSN/ESPN+	(9)	vs. (1) Oral Roberts; Quarterfinals	L 80–96	13–20	Denny Sanford Premier Center; Sioux Falls, SD
*Non-conference game. ^{#}Rankings from AP poll. (#) Tournament seedings in parentheses. All times are in Central.
