= 2022–23 Oral Roberts Golden Eagles men's basketball team =

American college basketball season

2022–23 Oral Roberts Golden Eagles men's basketball

Summit League regular-season and tournament champions

NCAA tournament, First Round
- Conference: Summit League
- Record: 30–5 (18–0 The Summit)
- Head coach: Paul Mills (6th season)
- Assistant coaches: Sam Patterson; Russell Springmann; Kenton Paulino
- Home arena: Mabee Center

2022–23 Summit League men's basketball standings
| | Conf. | | | | Overall |
| Team | W | | L | PCT | W | | L | PCT |
|---|---|---|---|---|---|---|---|---|
| Oral Roberts † | 18 | – | 0 | 1.000 | 30 | – | 5 | .857 |
| South Dakota State | 13 | – | 5 | .722 | 19 | – | 13 | .594 |
| North Dakota State | 11 | – | 7 | .611 | 16 | – | 17 | .485 |
| Western Illinois | 9 | – | 9 | .500 | 16 | – | 14 | .533 |
| St. Thomas * | 9 | – | 9 | .500 | 19 | – | 14 | .576 |
| South Dakota | 7 | – | 11 | .389 | 12 | – | 19 | .387 |
| Kansas City | 7 | – | 11 | .389 | 11 | – | 21 | .344 |
| Denver | 6 | – | 12 | .333 | 15 | – | 17 | .469 |
| North Dakota | 6 | – | 12 | .333 | 13 | – | 20 | .394 |
| Omaha | 4 | – | 14 | .222 | 9 | – | 23 | .281 |
† 2023 Summit League tournament winner * Ineligible for the 2023 NCAA tournament due to transition from Division III

The 2022–23 Oral Roberts Golden Eagles men's basketball team represented Oral Roberts University in the 2022–23 NCAA Division I men's basketball season. The Golden Eagles, led by sixth-year head coach Paul Mills, played their home games at the Mabee Center in Tulsa, Oklahoma, as members of the Summit League. They finished the season 30–5, 18–0 in Summit League play, to win the regular-season championship. They defeated North Dakota, St. Thomas and North Dakota State to win the Summit League tournament championship. As a result, the received the conference's automatic bid to the NCAA tournament as the No. 12 seed in the East region. There they lost to Duke in the first round.

On March 22, 2023, head coach Paul Mills left the school to take the head coaching position at Wichita State. Shortly thereafter, the school named assistant coach Russell Springmann the team's new head coach.

== Previous season ==
The Golden Eagles finished the 2021–22 season 19–12, 12–6 in Summit League play, to finish in fourth place. In the Summit League tournament, they defeated Western Illinois before falling to North Dakota State. They did not receive an invitation to the NCAA tournament or any other postseason tournament.

== Roster ==
2022–23 Oral Roberts Golden Eagles men's basketball team
Players
Coaches

| Pos. | # | Name | Height | Weight | Year | Hometown |
|---|---|---|---|---|---|---|
| G | 0 | Demari Williams | 6 ft 6 in (1.98 m) | 218 lb (99 kg) | So | Houston, TX |
| G | 2 | Kareem Thompson | 6 ft 5 in (1.96 m) | 208 lb (94 kg) | Sr | Florence, AL |
| G | 3 | Max Abmas | 6 ft 0 in (1.83 m) | 175 lb (79 kg) | Sr | Rockwall, TX |
| G | 4 | Jake Shannon | 6 ft 4 in (1.93 m) | 212 lb (96 kg) | So | Ada, OK |
| G | 5 | Cam Amboree | 6 ft 2 in (1.88 m) | 160 lb (73 kg) | Fr | Pearland, TX |
| G | 10 | Issac McBride | 6 ft 1 in (1.85 m) | 172 lb (78 kg) | Jr | Little Rock, AR |
| G | 11 | Carlos Jürgens | 6 ft 5 in (1.96 m) | 206 lb (93 kg) | RS Sr | Tartu, Estonia |
| C | 13 | Nate III Clover | 6 ft 8 in (2.03 m) | 248 lb (112 kg) | Jr | Port Arthur, TX |
| F | 14 | DeShang Weaver | 6 ft 7 in (2.01 m) | 212 lb (96 kg) | RS Sr | Houston, TX |
| G | 20 | Trey Phipps | 6 ft 2 in (1.88 m) | 178 lb (81 kg) | Jr | Tulsa, OK |
| F | 23 | Sir Issac Herron | 6 ft 9 in (2.06 m) | 220 lb (100 kg) | So | Houston, TX |
| G | 25 | Elijah Lawrence | 5 ft 11 in (1.8 m) | 160 lb (73 kg) | So | Bellaire, TX |
| F | 32 | Patrick Mwamba | 6 ft 7 in (2.01 m) | 206 lb (93 kg) | Jr | Kinshasa, DR Congo |
| F | 35 | Connor Vanover | 7 ft 5 in (2.26 m) | 227 lb (103 kg) | Sr | Little Rock, AR |

Head coach

- Paul Mills (Texas A&M)

Assistant coach(es)

- Sam Patterson (Baylor)
- Russell Springmann (Salisbury)
- Kenton Paulino (Texas)

Legend

- (C) Team captain
- (S) Suspended
- (I) Ineligible
- (W) Walk-on
- Injured
- Current redshirt

Roster
Last update: November 15, 2022

== Schedule and results ==
| Date time, TV | Rank^{#} | Opponent^{#} | Result | Record | Site (attendance) city, state |
Regular season
| November 7, 2022*; 9:00 p.m., WCCN | | at Saint Mary's | L 70–78 | 0–1 | University Credit Union Pavilion (3,219); Moraga, CA |
| November 11, 2022*; 7:00 p.m., ORUSN | | John Brown | W 95–62 | 1–1 | Mabee Center (5,097); Tulsa, OK |
| November 14, 2022*; 7:00 p.m., ESPN+ | | at No. 3 Houston; Cougar Classic | L 45–83 | 1–2 | Fertitta Center (7,246); Houston, TX |
| November 15, 2022*; 7:00 p.m. | | at Texas Southern; Cougar Classic | W 82–64 | 2–2 | H&PE Arena (2,109); Houston, TX |
| November 19, 2022*; 7:00 p.m., ORUSN | | Oklahoma Baptist | W 98–86 | 3–2 | Mabee Center (4,328); Tulsa, OK |
| November 22, 2022*; 8:00 p.m. | | at Utah State | L 85–95 | 3–3 | Smith Spectrum (5,980); Logan, UT |
| November 27, 2022*; 4:00 p.m., ORUSN | | Rogers State | W 81–70 | 4–3 | Mabee Center (3,787); Tulsa, OK |
| November 29, 2022*; 7:00 p.m., ORUSN | | Ozark Christian; Nike N7 Native American Heritage Night | W 116–68 | 5–3 | Mabee Center (3,527); Tulsa, OK |
| December 3, 2022*; 2:00 p.m., ESPN+ | | at Tulsa; PSO Mayor's Cup | W 77–66 | 6–3 | Reynolds Center (4,662); Tulsa, OK |
| December 10, 2022*; 7:00 p.m., ORUSN | | Central Arkansas | W 111–78 | 7–3 | Mabee Center (3,897); Tulsa, OK |
| December 12, 2022*; 7:00 p.m., ORUSN | | Liberty | W 84–70 | 8–3 | Mabee Center (4,422); Tulsa, OK |
| December 16, 2022*; 7:00 p.m., ORUSN | | Missouri State | W 80–77 | 9–3 | Mabee Center (4,692); Tulsa, OK |
| December 19, 2022; 7:00 p.m., ORUSN | | South Dakota State | W 79–40 | 10–3 (1–0) | Mabee Center (4,579); Tulsa, OK |
| December 29, 2022; 7:00 p.m. | | at Omaha | W 92–89 | 11–3 (2–0) | Baxter Arena (2,208); Omaha, NE |
| December 31, 2022; 3:00 p.m. | | at Denver | W 80–62 | 12–3 (3–0) | Hamilton Gymnasium (1,081); Denver, CO |
| January 7, 2023; 7:00 p.m., ORUSN | | Kansas City | W 74–71 | 13–3 (4–0) | Mabee Center (6,011); Tulsa, OK |
| January 9, 2023*; 7:00 p.m. | | at New Mexico | L 75–82 | 13–4 | The Pit (9,249); Albuquerque, NM |
| January 12, 2023; 7:00 p.m., ORUSN | | Western Illinois | W 87–63 | 14–4 (5–0) | Mabee Center (5,183); Tulsa, OK |
| January 14, 2023; 7:00 p.m., ORUSN | | St. Thomas | W 81–69 | 15–4 (6–0) | Mabee Center (5,684); Tulsa, OK |
| January 19, 2023; 7:00 p.m., ESPN+ | | at North Dakota State | W 92–69 | 16–4 (7–0) | Scheels Center (3,265); Fargo, ND |
| January 21, 2023; 1:00 p.m., ESPN+ | | at North Dakota | W 84–72 | 17–4 (8–0) | Betty Engelstad Sioux Center (1,655); Grand Forks, ND |
| January 26, 2023; 7:00 p.m., ORUSN | | Denver | W 102–61 | 18–4 (9–0) | Mabee Center (5,249); Tulsa, OK |
| January 28, 2023; 7:00 p.m., ORUSN | | Omaha | W 73–64 | 19–4 (10–0) | Mabee Center (7,846); Tulsa, OK |
| January 30, 2023; 7:00 p.m., ORUSN | | South Dakota; Rescheduled from December 21 | W 103–53 | 20–4 (11–0) | Mabee Center (5,224); Tulsa, OK |
| February 4, 2023; 7:00 p.m. | | at Kansas City | W 85–57 | 21–4 (12–0) | Swinney Recreation Center (1,523); Kansas City, MO |
| February 9, 2023; 7:00 p.m. | | at St. Thomas | W 95–88 | 22–4 (13–0) | Schoenecker Arena (2,013); St. Paul, MN |
| February 11, 2023; 2:00 p.m. | | at Western Illinois | W 82–73 | 23–4 (14–0) | Western Hall (1,681); Macomb, IL |
| February 16, 2023; 7:00 p.m., ORUSN | | North Dakota | W 73–70 | 24–4 (15–0) | Mabee Center (7,492); Tulsa, OK |
| February 18, 2023; 7:00 p.m., ORUSN | | North Dakota State | W 74–66 | 25–4 (16–0) | Mabee Center (8,012); Tulsa, OK |
| February 23, 2023; 7:00 p.m., ESPN+ | | at South Dakota | W 82–70 | 26–4 (17–0) | Sanford Coyote Sports Center (1,813); Vermillion, SD |
| February 25, 2023; 2:00 p.m. | | at South Dakota State | W 69–65 | 27–4 (18–0) | Frost Arena (4,207); Brookings, SD |
Summit League tournament
| March 4, 2023; 6:00 p.m., MidcoSN/ESPN+ | (1) | vs. (9) North Dakota; Quarterfinals | W 96–80 | 28–4 | Denny Sanford Premier Center; Sioux Falls, SD |
| March 6, 2023; 6:00 p.m., MidcoSN/ESPN+ | (1) | vs. (5) St. Thomas; Semifinals | W 70–65 | 29–4 | Denny Sanford Premier Center; Sioux Falls, SD |
| March 7, 2023; 8:00 p.m., ESPN2 | (1) | vs. (3) North Dakota State; Championship | W 92–58 | 30–4 | Denny Sanford Premier Center (5,011); Sioux Falls, SD |
NCAA tournament
| March 16, 2023*; 6:10 p.m., CBS | (12 E) | vs. (5 E) No. 12 Duke; First Round | L 51–74 | 30–5 | Amway Center (18,018); Orlando, FL |
*Non-conference game. ^{#}Rankings from AP poll. (#) Tournament seedings in parentheses. E=East. All times are in Central.
