= 2022–23 Omaha Mavericks men's basketball team =

American college basketball season

2022–23 Omaha Mavericks men's basketball
- Conference: Summit League
- Record: 9–23 (4–14 The Summit)
- Head coach: Chris Crutchfield (1st season)
- Assistant coaches: Kyan Brown; Kenya Crandell; Warren Niles
- Home arena: Baxter Arena

2022–23 Summit League men's basketball standings
	Conf.				Overall
Team	W		L	PCT	W		L	PCT
Oral Roberts †	18	–	0	1.000	30	–	5	.857
South Dakota State	13	–	5	.722	19	–	13	.594
North Dakota State	11	–	7	.611	16	–	17	.485
Western Illinois	9	–	9	.500	16	–	14	.533
St. Thomas *	9	–	9	.500	19	–	14	.576
South Dakota	7	–	11	.389	12	–	19	.387
Kansas City	7	–	11	.389	11	–	21	.344
Denver	6	–	12	.333	15	–	17	.469
North Dakota	6	–	12	.333	13	–	20	.394
Omaha	4	–	14	.222	9	–	23	.281
† 2023 Summit League tournament winner * Ineligible for the 2023 NCAA tournament due to transition from Division III

The 2022–23 Omaha Mavericks men's basketball team represented the University of Nebraska Omaha in the 2022–23 NCAA Division I men's basketball season. The Mavericks, led by first-year head coach Chris Crutchfield, played their home games at Baxter Arena in Omaha, Nebraska as members of the Summit League.

The Mavericks finished the season 9–23, 4–14 in Summit League play, to finish in 10th (last) place. They defeated Kansas City in the first round of the Summit League tournament before losing to South Dakota State in the quarterfinals.

== Previous season ==
The Mavericks finished the 2021–22 season 5–25, 4–14 in Summit League play, to finish in ninth place. They lost to South Dakota State in the quarterfinals of the Summit League tournament.

== Roster ==
2022–23 Omaha Mavericks men's basketball team
Players
Coaches

Pos.	#	Name	Height	Weight	Year	Hometown
F	0	Luke Jungers	6 ft 9 in (2.06 m)	210 lb (95 kg)	Fr	Omaha, NE
G	1	JJ White	6 ft 2 in (1.88 m)	185 lb (84 kg)	So	Lawrenceville, GA
G	2	Jaeden Marshall	6 ft 4 in (1.93 m)	210 lb (95 kg)	So	Hinesville, GA
G	3	Kyle Luedtke	6 ft 5 in (1.96 m)	190 lb (86 kg)	Sr	Omaha, NE
F	4	Kennedy Brown	6 ft 9 in (2.06 m)	225 lb (102 kg)	So	Chicago, IL
G	5	Ja'Sean Glover	6 ft 4 in (1.93 m)	190 lb (86 kg)	Fr	Madelia, MN
F	10	Marquel Sutton	6 ft 7 in (2.01 m)	205 lb (93 kg)	So	Tulsa, OK
G	11	La'Mel Robinson	6 ft 0 in (1.83 m)	160 lb (73 kg)	Jr	Riverside, MO
G	12	Zander Beard	6 ft 2 in (1.88 m)	170 lb (77 kg)	Fr	Lincoln, NE
C	14	Dylan Brougham	6 ft 9 in (2.06 m)	195 lb (88 kg)	Jr	Riverside, MO
G	15	Grant Frickenstein	6 ft 3 in (1.91 m)	185 lb (84 kg)	Jr	Fremont, NE
G	20	Louis Fidler	6 ft 5 in (1.96 m)	175 lb (79 kg)	Jr	Bellevue, NE
F	23	Frankie Fidler	6 ft 7 in (2.01 m)	200 lb (91 kg)	So	Bellevue, NE
F	24	Jamal Ambrose	6 ft 10 in (2.08 m)	250 lb (113 kg)	Fr	Apple Valley, MN
G	32	Tony Osburn	6 ft 2 in (1.88 m)	180 lb (82 kg)	Fr	Fairfax, MO
F	33	Akol Arop	6 ft 5 in (1.96 m)	203 lb (92 kg)	Jr	Omaha, NE

Head coach

- Chris Crutchfield (Omaha)

Assistant coach(es)

- Kyan Brown (Oral Roberts)
- Kenya Crandell (Nebraska–Kearney)
- Warren Niles (Oral Roberts)

Legend

- (C) Team captain
- (S) Suspended
- (I) Ineligible
- (W) Walk-on
- Injured
- Current redshirt

Roster
Last update: November 23, 2022

== Schedule and results ==
Date time, TV	Rank^{#}	Opponent^{#}	Result	Record	Site (attendance) city, state
Exhibition
November 1, 2022*; 7:05 p.m.		Mid-America Christian	W 96–71	–	Baxter Arena; Omaha, NE
Regular season
November 7, 2022*; 7:00 p.m., ESPN+		at No. 5 Kansas	L 64–89	0–1	Allen Fieldhouse (16,300); Lawrence, KS
November 10, 2022*; 7:00 p.m., BTN+		at Nebraska	L 61–75	0–2	Pinnacle Bank Arena (13,447); Lincoln, NE
November 13, 2022*; 2:05 p.m.		Idaho	W 79–72	1–2	Baxter Arena (2,108); Omaha, NE
November 16, 2022*; 7:37 p.m.		Ball State	L 61–71	1–3	Baxter Arena (2,115); Omaha, NE
November 21, 2022*; 7:00 p.m., BTN		at No. 25 Iowa; Emerald Coast Classic campus-site game	L 64–100	1–4	Carver–Hawkeye Arena (9,467); Iowa City, IA
November 25, 2022*; 1:30 p.m.		vs. Louisiana–Monroe; Emerald Coast Classic semifinals	W 63–56	2–4	The Arena at NFSC; Niceville, FL
November 26, 2022*; 12:30 p.m.		vs. Southern; Emerald Coast Classic championship	W 88–78	3–4	The Arena at NFSC; Niceville, FL
November 28, 2022*; 6:30 p.m., ESPN+		at Mississippi State	L 54–74	3–5	Humphrey Coliseum (6,090); Starkville, MS
December 3, 2022*; 5:00 p.m., ESPN+		at North Texas	L 45–75	3–6	The Super Pit (3,035); Denton, TX
December 7, 2022*; 7:00 p.m., ESPN+		at Drake	L 65–78	3–7	Knapp Center (2,702); Des Moines, IA
December 10, 2022*; 5:00 p.m., ESPN+		at Montana State	L 54–82	3–8	Brick Breeden Fieldhouse (1,975); Bozeman, MT
December 13, 2022*; 12:05 p.m.		Midland	W 104–72	4–8	Baxter Arena (4,316); Omaha, NE
December 19, 2022; 7:05 p.m.		Denver	W 83–66	5–8 (1–0)	Baxter Arena (2,505); Omaha, NE
December 21, 2022*; 6:00 p.m.		at Iowa State	Cancelled due to Winter Storm Elliott		Hilton Coliseum; Ames, IA
December 29, 2022; 7:05 p.m.		Oral Roberts	L 89–92	5–9 (1–1)	Baxter Arena (2,208); Omaha, NE
December 31, 2022; 1:05 p.m.		Kansas City	L 59–75	5–10 (1–2)	Baxter Arena (1,686); Omaha, NE
January 5, 2023; 6:00 p.m.		at Western Illinois	W 78–74	6–10 (2–2)	Western Hall (354); Macomb, IL
January 7, 2023; 7:00 p.m.		at St. Thomas	L 68–80	6–11 (2–3)	Schoenecker Arena (1,332); St. Paul, MN
January 12, 2023; 7:05 p.m.		North Dakota	W 69–63	7–11 (3–3)	Baxter Arena (2,091); Omaha, NE
January 14, 2023; 12:05 p.m.		North Dakota State	L 65–78	7–12 (3–4)	Baxter Arena (1,639); Omaha, NE
January 19, 2023; 7:00 p.m.		at South Dakota State	L 61–84	7–13 (3–5)	Frost Arena (1,939); Brookings, SD
January 21, 2023; 1:00 p.m.		at South Dakota	L 68–84	7–14 (3–6)	Sanford Coyote Sports Center (2,141); Vermillion, SD
January 26, 2023; 7:00 p.m.		at Kansas City	L 61–64	7–15 (3–7)	Swinney Recreation Center (1,012); Kansas City, MO
January 28, 2023; 7:00 p.m.		at Oral Roberts	L 64–73	7–16 (3–8)	Mabee Center (7,846); Tulsa, OK
February 2, 2023; 7:05 p.m.		St. Thomas	L 83–89	7–17 (3–9)	Baxter Arena (1,261); Omaha, NE
February 4, 2023; 2:05 p.m.		Western Illinois	L 72–75	7–18 (3–10)	Baxter Arena (1,898); Omaha, NE
February 9, 2023; 7:00 p.m.		at North Dakota State	L 58–84	7–19 (3–11)	Scheels Center (1,805); Fargo, ND
February 11, 2023; 1:00 p.m.		at North Dakota	L 73–76 ^{OT}	7–20 (3–12)	Betty Engelstad Sioux Center (1,534); Grand Forks, ND
February 16, 2023; 7:05 p.m.		South Dakota	W 80–72	8–20 (4–12)	Baxter Arena (1,665); Omaha, NE
February 18, 2023; 7:05 p.m.		South Dakota State	L 70–91	8–21 (4–13)	Baxter Arena (3,242); Omaha, NE
February 25, 2023; 4:00 p.m.		at Denver	L 61–72	8–22 (4–14)	Hamilton Gymnasium (1,335); Denver, CO
Summit League tournament
March 3, 2023; 8:30 p.m., ESPN+	(10)	vs. (7) Kansas City; First round	W 73–61	9–22	Denny Sanford Premier Center; Sioux Falls, SD
March 4, 2023; 8:30 p.m., ESPN+	(10)	vs. (2) South Dakota State; Quarterfinals	L 55–63	9–23	Denny Sanford Premier Center; Sioux Falls, SD
*Non-conference game. ^{#}Rankings from AP poll. (#) Tournament seedings in parentheses. All times are in Central.
