= Eric Peterson (basketball) =

American men's basketball coach (born 1985)

Current position
- Title: Head coach
- Team: South Dakota
- Conference: Summit
- Record: 61–74 (.452)

Biographical details
- Born: April 17, 1983 (age 43); West Salem, Wisconsin, U.S.
- Education: University of Wisconsin–La Crosse

Coaching career (HC unless noted)
- 2003–2005: La Crescent High School (MN) (assistant)
- 2005–2009: Williston State (assistant)
- 2009–2011: Minnesota State–Moorhead (assistant)
- 2011–2012: Williston State (assistant)
- 2012–2014: Williston State
- 2014–2018: South Dakota (assistant)
- 2018–2021: Utah State (assistant)
- 2021–2022: Utah (assistant)
- 2022–present: South Dakota

Administrative career (AD unless noted)
- 2011–2014: Williston State

Head coaching record
- Overall: 61–74 (.452) (NCAA); 52–15 (.776) (NJCAA)

Eric Allen Peterson (born April 17, 1983) is an American basketball coach who is the current head coach of the South Dakota Coyotes men's basketball team.

== Coaching career ==
While still in college, Peterson served as an assistant coach at La Crescent High School in La Crescent, Minnesota while also working with AAU teams in Wisconsin. In 2005, Peterson began his college coaching career as an assistant at Williston State, before moving on to join the coaching staff at Minnesota State–Moorhead from 2009 to 2011.

He'd return to Williston State, this time as an assistant coach and athletic director. In 2012, he'd be elevated to the head coaching position where he'd guide the Tetons to a 52–15 mark including at 2013 Region XIII championship and 2014 Mon-Dak Conference, while also earning coach of the year honors at the regional and conference levels too. Peterson would then join Craig Smith's staff at South Dakota, and follow Smith at his subsequent stops at both Utah State and Utah.

On March 16, 2022, Peterson returned to South Dakota, being named the 20th head coach in program history, replacing Todd Lee.

== Head coaching record ==
=== NJCAA ===
Record table
Season	Team	Overall	Conference	Standing	Postseason
Williston State (Mon-Dak) (2012–2014)
2012–13	Williston State	25–9	8–2		
2013–14	Williston State	27–6	9–1		
Williston State:		52–15 (.776)	17–3 (.850)		
Total:		52–15 (.776)			
National champion Postseason invitational champion Conference regular season champion Conference regular season and conference tournament champion Division regular season champion Division regular season and conference tournament champion Conference tournament champion

=== NCAA D1 ===
Record table
Season	Team	Overall	Conference	Standing	Postseason
South Dakota (Summit League) (2022–present)
2022–23	South Dakota	12–19	7–11	T–6th	
2023–24	South Dakota	12–20	5–11	T–8th	
2024–25	South Dakota	19–14	9–7	5th	
2025–26	South Dakota	16–16	8–8	T–4th	
2026–27	South Dakota	2–5	0–0		
South Dakota:		61–74 (.452)	29–37 (.439)		
Total:		61–74 (.452)			
National champion Postseason invitational champion Conference regular season champion Conference regular season and conference tournament champion Division regular season champion Division regular season and conference tournament champion Conference tournament champion
