= Paul Mills =

American basketball coach (born 1972)

Current position
- Title: Head coach
- Team: Wichita State
- Conference: The American
- Record: 59–46 (.562)

Biographical details
- Born: April 4, 1972 (age 54); Houston, Texas, U.S.
- Education: Texas A&M ('96)

Coaching career (HC unless noted)
- 1996–1999: North Belt Christian Academy
- 1999–2002: Fort Bend Baptist Academy
- 2003–2017: Baylor (assistant)
- 2017–2023: Oral Roberts
- 2023–present: Wichita State

Administrative career (AD unless noted)
- 2002–2003: Rice (video coord.)

Head coaching record
- Overall: 165–130 (.559)
- Tournaments: 2–2 (NCAA Division I); 2–2 (NIT)

Accomplishments and honors

Championships
- 2 Summit League tournament (2021, 2023); Summit League regular season (2023)

Awards
- Summit League Coach of the Year (2023)

Paul Kerry Mills (born April 4, 1972) is an American college basketball coach who is currently the head coach at Wichita State.

== Early life ==
Mills, the son of a pastor in the Houston-area community of Aldine, Texas, grew up in a parsonage attached to the church where his father preached. In a story by Pete Thamel of Yahoo Sports during the 2021 NCAA tournament, Mills recalled that his family was one of the few white families in his neighborhood. Although he never grew beyond 5 feet 8 inches (1.73 m), he made the basketball team at Houston's MacArthur High School. In the same Yahoo story, his high school coach Walt Kaser recalled that Mills was the last white player he coached. Kaser also told Thamel that he immediately recognized that Mills would become a coach.

While Mills earned a partial scholarship to NAIA school Southern Wesleyan University, he told Thamel that he could remember suiting up for only one game, in 1990–91. That fall, he dove for a loose ball in practice and suffered a broken vertebra in his lower back when it hit a concrete step. Recalling the accident, Mills told Thamel, "I knew it right away, I couldn’t walk. When the doctor told me I wouldn’t be able to play again, I was in full-fledged tears." To this day, he never sits during a basketball game because of lingering pain from the injury. He would transfer to Texas A&M University to be closer to home.

== Coaching career ==
=== Early jobs ===
After graduating from Texas A&M in 1996 with a bachelor's degree in finance, Mills got a job as a bond analyst with a Texas bank, moonlighting as a high school coach in the Houston area at North Belt Christian Academy. In three years at North Belt, he led the team to a 63–17 record and three district championships. He then decided in 1999 to pursue full-time coaching. He and his wife Wendy prayed about this decision, and as he told Thamel, "My phone rings immediately after I say 'Amen'". The caller was the athletic director at Fort Bend Baptist Academy, now Fort Bend Christian Academy, who offered him a full-time teaching and coaching position. Mills also told Thamel "I never applied. To this day, I don't know who told her to hire me." He accepted the job despite a drastic cut in pay—from $80,000 at the bank to $12,000 at Fort Bend Baptist; this was the first of three times that he took a pay cut to accept a position that would advance his coaching career. Mills remained head coach at Fort Bend Baptist until 2002, when he became video coordinator at Rice under Willis Wilson. This was the second time he accepted a pay cut; his position at Rice was a volunteer position, with his only pay being a $2,000 stipend for painting the 1,261 steps of Rice's basketball home of Tudor Fieldhouse. Mills recalled that he was "hooked" on coaching during his season at Rice. Todd Smith, a Rice assistant at that time, recalled that Mills was so enthusiastic about coaching that he regularly arrived at the team offices before and left after Smith, with Smith giving Mills his set of keys to the offices.

=== Baylor ===
In 2003, Mills joined Scott Drew's staff at Baylor, where he stayed for 14 years, and was part of seven NCAA appearances by the Bears. Mills was initially a director of operations, becoming a full assistant in 2009 when Matthew Driscoll left to become head coach at North Florida.

=== Oral Roberts ===
On April 28, 2017, Mills was named the head coach at Oral Roberts, replacing Scott Sutton. This was the last of the three times he took a pay cut to advance in his profession. In the 2022–23 season, Mills guided the Golden Eagles to just the second perfect regular season in league history. He was named Summit League Coach of the Year.

=== Wichita State ===
Mills was hired by Wichita State on March 22, 2023.

== Personal life ==
Mills is married to the former Wendy Scott, whom he has known since the seventh grade. They have two daughters. The family are devout Christians, and Mills earned a master's degree from Dallas Theological Seminary in 2020. When Mills was promoted to full-time assistant at Baylor, he inherited Driscoll's courtesy car, a Chrysler 300. This meant that Mills no longer needed the Honda Accord he had been driving, and he gave it to a woman whom he saw waiting every day at a bus stop on his way to work—despite never actually meeting her until he gave her the car.

While at Baylor and Oral Roberts, he obsessively watched the basketball film Hoosiers, claiming to Thamel that he had watched the movie more than 1,000 times in his life. According to Thamel, "Scott Drew would have him deliver lines on the team bus and then play the scenes to test his accuracy." Drew told Thamel, "Literally, you can pause it at any time in the movie and he’ll give you the next 10 lines in a row. He has it memorized."

== Head coaching record ==
The following table displays Mills' head coaching record at the collegiate level.

Record table
Season	Team	Overall	Conference	Standing	Postseason
Oral Roberts Golden Eagles (Summit League) (2017–2023)
2017–18	Oral Roberts	11–21	5–9	T–5th	
2018–19	Oral Roberts	11–21	7–9	T–5th	
2019–20	Oral Roberts	17–14	9–7	T–4th	
2020–21	Oral Roberts	18–11	10–5	4th	NCAA Division I Sweet 16
2021–22	Oral Roberts	19–12	12–6	T–3rd	
2022–23	Oral Roberts	30–5	18–0	1st	NCAA Division I Round of 64
Oral Roberts:		106–84 (.558)	61–36 (.629)		
Wichita State Shockers (American Athletic Conference) (2023–present)
2023–24	Wichita State	15–19	5–13	T–10th	
2024–25	Wichita State	19–15	8–10	8th	NIT First Round
2025–26	Wichita State	24–12	13–5	T–2nd	NIT Quarterfinals
2026–27	Wichita State	1–0	0–0		
Wichita State:		59–46 (.562)	26–28 (.481)		
Total:		165–130 (.559)			
National champion Postseason invitational champion Conference regular season champion Conference regular season and conference tournament champion Division regular season champion Division regular season and conference tournament champion Conference tournament champion
