= Brandon Ubel =

American basketball player and coach

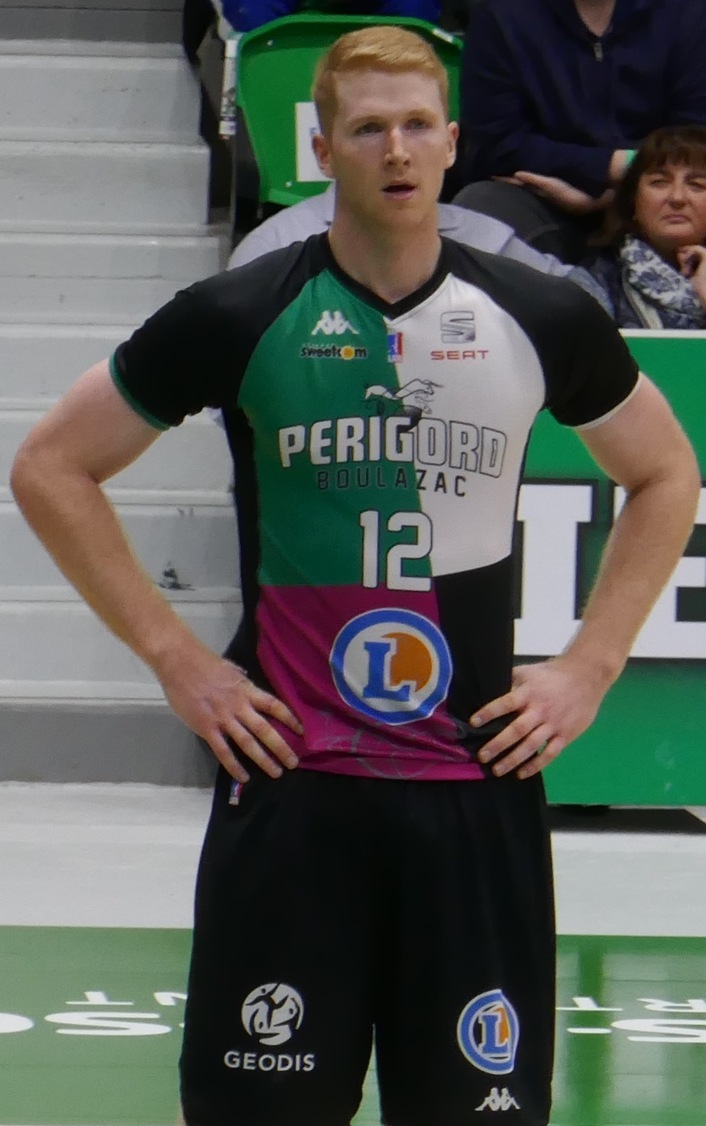
- Ubel playing for Boulazac in 2018

Tarleton State Texans
- Position: Assistant coach
- League: Western Athletic Conference

Personal information
- Born: August 29, 1991 (age 35) Overland Park, Kansas
- Listed height: 6 ft 10 in (2.08 m)
- Listed weight: 233 lb (106 kg)

Career information
- High school: Blue Valley West (Overland Park, Kansas)
- College: Nebraska (2009–2013)
- NBA draft: 2013: undrafted
- Playing career: 2013–2018
- Coaching career: 2019–present

Career history

Playing
- 2013–2014: Brussels
- 2014–2015: Antwerp Giants
- 2015–2017: Brussels
- 2017–2018: Boulazac Dordogne

Coaching
- 2019–2021: Utah State (GA)
- 2021–2022: Utah (dir. of scouting)
- 2022–2026: South Dakota (assistant)
- 2026-Present: Tarleton State (assistant)

Brandon Ubel (born August 29, 1991) is an American basketball coach and former player who is currently an assistant coach at Tarleton State University.

== Professional career ==
Ubel signed with Basic-Fit Brussels of the Belgian Ethias League in May 2013. For the 2014–15 season, Ubel signed with Port of Antwerp Giants.

== Coaching career ==
After the conclusion of his playing career in Europe, Ubel returned to the United States to begin coaching. He worked as an assistant under Craig Smith for three seasons as Utah State and Utah before accepting a position as an assistant coach at the University of South Dakota in 2022.
